= Hkun Law =

Hkun Law ခုန်လဴ ခွန်လော

King of Martaban
- Reign: by 28 January 1307 – March 1311
- Predecessor: Wareru
- Successor: Saw O
- Born: 27 March 1254; Friday, 7th waxing of Late Tagu 615 ME; Tagaw Wun; Pagan Empire
- Died: March 1311 (aged 56); Late Tagu 672 ME near Martaban (Mottama); Martaban Kingdom
- Issue: Binnya E Law; Sanda Min Hla; Tala Shin Saw Bok
- House: Wareru
- Religion: Theravada Buddhism

Hkun Law (Mon: ခုန်လဴ, Burmese: ခွန်လော, Burmese pronunciation: [kʰʊ̀ɰ̃ lɔ́]; also spelled Khun Law; also Binnya Khon-Law; 1254–1311) was king of Martaban from 1307 to 1311. He succeeded the throne after the death of his brother Wareru, who left no male heir.

Though Law gained the recognition of Martaban's overlord Sukhothai, he could not establish any control beyond the capital Martaban (Mottama). He was powerless to defend the Sittaung valley from raids by the Lan Na kingdom. His nominal vassals ruled like sovereigns. In 1311, he was assassinated by the troops of his brother-in-law Gov. Min Bala of Myaungmya, who placed his son (and Law's nephew) Saw O on the throne.

Most of the monarchs of the Wareru dynasty that ruled the Mon-speaking Lower Burma until the mid-16th century were descended from Law.

== Early life ==
The future king was born Ma Gada (Mon: မဂဒါ, Burmese: မဂဒါ) in Donwun on 27 March 1254. (Note: The Razadarit Ayedawbon chronicle (Pan Hla 2005: 37) says he was born on Friday, 7th waxing of Late Tagu 635 (Thursday, 15 March 1274). But 635 ME was likely a typographical error. The chronicle (Pan Hla 2005: 16) says he had an elder brother Ma Gadu and a younger sister Hnin U Yaing. The chronicle's later narrative (Pan Hla 2005: 37) again mentions twice that Gada was U Yaing's older brother. Since Gadu was born in 1253 per (Pan Hla 2005: 36), and since Hnin U Yaing was already in her marriage age in 1281/82 per (Pan Hla 2005: 21–23), it was highly unlikely that Gada would have been born 21 years later in 1274, and Hnin U Yaing even later. Instead, the birth date was more likely Friday, 7th waxing of Late Tagu 615 ME (Friday, 27 March 1254), date translated per (Eade 1989: 100).) Gada had two siblings, an elder brother Ma Gadu and a younger sister Hnin U Yaing. They were of Shan and/or Mon background. (Note: They had Mon language names. Though none of the major chronicles—the Razadarit Ayedawbon and the Pak Lat Chronicles—says anything about their ethnicity, British colonial scholarship (See: Phayre 1967: 65, Harvey 1925: 110) conjectured that they were ethnic Shans. Later scholars appear to hedge: per (Htin Aung 1967: 78), they were likely of both Mon and Shan backgrounds, while (Aung-Thwin and Aung-Thwin 2012: 118) says they were of either Mon or Shan background.)

Gada later became heir-presumptive of the polity that his brother founded in 1287. That year, Gadu, styled as Wareru, declared independence from the collapsing Pagan Empire. He later expanded his reach into Pegu and the Irrawaddy delta, consolidating three Mon-speaking provinces of Lower Burma into a polity, successfully fighting off Pagan's attempt to retake Lower Burma in 1295–96. However, Gada's role was likely minimal as he is not mentioned in the chronicles at all during his brother's reign. At any rate, Gada was the heir presumptive as Wareru did not have a male heir. Indeed he succeeded the Martaban throne in 1307 when King Wareru was assassinated by the king's two grandsons.

== Reign ==
His first act as king was to seek his overlord king of Sukhothai's recognition. (Wareru had sought and received Sukhothai's support in exchange for nominal vassalage at least since 1293, and had been a Mongol vassal since 1298.) The king of Sukhothai recognized Gada as the rightful successor, and gave him the title of Saw Ran Parakut. The new vassal king was also now known as Hkun Law, or Binnya Khon Law.

Despite Sukhothai's support, Law was not respected by his vassals or neighbors. Within the first year of his reign, Lan Na raided deep into Martaban territory, reaching as far south as Donwun. The raid killed Gov. Nyi Yan Maw-La-Mon of Donwun, whom Law had just appointed. The new king's inability to organize an effective defense against the raid further weakened support among his restive nominal vassals. Indeed, Law's brother-in-law Gov. Min Bala of Myaungmya practically ruled the Irrawaddy delta like a sovereign. Over the next three years, Law's performance did not improve. Bala became further emboldened, and began eyeing the Martaban throne itself.

In March 1311, (Note: The chronicle Razadarit Ayedawbon (Pan Hla 2005: 37, 39) says Hkun Law died in 672 ME, and soon after Saw O ascended the throne on Saturday, 6th waning of Tagu 673 ME (10 April 1311). It means Law most probably died in the last weeks of 672 ME (March 1311).) Bala and Hnin U Yaing seized the Martaban throne while Law was on an elephant hunting trip near Moulmein (Mawlamyaing). Law found out about the coup only upon his return from the hunting trip when he found the capital's gates firmly shut. He tried to flee to the nearby woods, but Bala's troops chased him and killed him there.

The throne was vacant for at least two weeks. (Note: Since Law was 56 (in his 57th year), he must have died by 6th waxing of Late Tagu 672 ME (26 March 1311). Per (Pan Hla 2005: 39), Saw O became king on Saturday, 6th waxing of Tagu 673 ME (10 April 1311).) Bala initially thought about taking over the throne himself but yielded to his wife's demand that their eldest son Saw O succeed instead. Saw O became king on 10 April 1311.

== Legacy ==
His legacy was his progeny. Although Hkun Law was not an effective ruler, all of the monarchs of the Wareru dynasty that ruled Lower Burma from 1330 until the mid-16th century—i.e. Binnya E Law (r. 1330–1348) onwards except Dhammazedi (r. 1471–1492)—were his direct descendants.

== Bibliography ==
- Aung-Thwin, Michael A.; Maitrii Aung-Thwin (2012). A History of Myanmar Since Ancient Times (illustrated ed.). Honolulu: University of Hawai'i Press. ISBN 978-1-86189-901-9.
- Aung-Thwin, Michael A. (2017). Myanmar in the Fifteenth Century. Honolulu: University of Hawai'i Press. ISBN 978-0-8248-6783-6.
- Eade, J.C. (1989). Southeast Asian Ephemeris: Solar and Planetary Positions, A.D. 638–2000. Ithaca: Cornell University. ISBN 0-87727-704-4.
- Harvey, G. E. (1925). History of Burma: From the Earliest Times to 10 March 1824. London: Frank Cass & Co. Ltd.
- Htin Aung, Maung (1967). A History of Burma. New York and London: Cambridge University Press.
- Pan Hla, Nai (2005) [1968]. Razadarit Ayedawbon (in Burmese) (8th printing ed.). Yangon: Armanthit Sarpay.
- Phayre, Lt. Gen. Sir Arthur P. (1967) [1883]. History of Burma. London: Susil Gupta.
- Shwe Naw, ed. (1922) [1785]. Mon Yazawin (Shwe Naw) (in Burmese). Translated by Shwe Naw. Yangon: Burma Publishing Workers Association Press.

Hkun Law Hanthawaddy Dynasty Born: 27 March 1254 Died: by 26 March 1311
Regnal titles
Preceded by Wareru	King of Martaban; January 1307 – March 1311	Succeeded by Saw O
Royal titles
New title	Heir-presumptive of Martaban; 1287–1307	Succeeded by Saw Zein
