= May Hnin Htapi =

Queen of the Northern Palace of Martaban
- Tenure: September 1323 – April 1330
- Predecessor: unknown
- Successor: Tala Shin Saw Bok

Chief Queen Consort of Martaban
- Tenure: c. April 1311 – September 1323
- Predecessor: unknown
- Successor: Sanda Min Hla
- Born: c. 1290s Sukhothai?
- Died: 1330? Martaban (Mottama)
- Spouse: Saw O (1311–23); Saw Zein (1323–30)
- Issue: Saw E May Hnin Aw Kanya; Mi Ma-Hsan; Min Linka
- House: Phra Ruang Dynasty
- Father: Loe Thai
- Mother: unknown
- Religion: Theravada Buddhism

May Hnin Htapi (Burmese: မေနှင်းထပီ, Burmese pronunciation: [mè n̥ɪ́ɴ tʰəpì]) was the chief queen consort of King Saw O of Martaban, and a senior queen consort of King Saw Zein of Martaban. She was the mother of King Saw E.

== Brief ==
The queen was a daughter of King Loe Thai of Sukhothai. In 1311, her father sent her to Martaban (Mottama) to marry King Saw O, who had just ascended the Martaban throne. (Martaban had been a nominal vassal of Sukhothai since its founding.) At Martaban, she became the chief queen, and bore two children, a son, Saw E and a daughter, May Hnin Aw Kanya. But her husband was not loyal to her father. Saw O soon discarded his overlord, and went on to seize Tavoy (Dawei) and Tenasserim from Sukhothai in 1321.

Htapi briefly became a widow in September 1323 when Saw O died. But the successor Saw Zein immediately raised his sister-in-law as his second ranked queen at his accession. She had a daughter, Mi Ma-Hsan, and a son, Min Linka. Her reign as queen ended in 1330 when Zein was assassinated. The assassin Zein Pun seized the throne but was executed a week later by Saw Zein's powerful chief queen Sanda Min Hla. Htapi's eldest child Saw E became king. But Htapi's stint as the queen mother lasted just 49 days as her son too was assassinated by Sanda Min Hla.

Htapi may have had a hand in the subsequent war between Martaban and Sukhothai. According to the Razadarit Ayedawbon chronicle, the king of Sukhothai was angered by the death of Saw E, and sent an invasion force. But the new king Binnya E Law defeated the invasion. Htapi is not heard from again in the chronicle.

== Bibliography ==
- Pan Hla, Nai (2005) [1968]. Razadarit Ayedawbon (in Burmese) (8th printing ed.). Yangon: Armanthit Sarpay.
- Phayre, Lt. Gen. Sir Arthur P. (1967) [1883]. History of Burma. London: Susil Gupta.

May Hnin Htapi Wareru Dynasty Born: c. 1290s Died: 1330?
Royal titles
Unknown	Chief Queen of Martaban c. April 1311 – September 1323	Succeeded by Sanda Min Hla
Unknown	Queen of the Northern Palace of Martaban; September 1323 – April 1330	Succeeded by Tala Shin Saw Bok
