= Binnya E Laung =

14th century heir-presumptive of Martaban

Binnya E Laung ဗညားအဲလောင်

Heir Presumptive of Martaban
- Reign: 1330 – 1340s
- Predecessor: Saw Zein
- Successor: Binnya U
- Born: 1320s Pegu (Bago)?, Martaban Kingdom
- Died: 1340s Martaban (Mottama), Martaban Kingdom
- House: Wareru
- Father: Binnya E Law
- Mother: unknown
- Religion: Theravada Buddhism

Binnya E Laung (Burmese: ဗညားအဲလောင်, pronounced [bəɲá ʔɛ́ làʊ̯ɴ]) was heir-presumptive of Martaban from 1330 to the 1340s. The only known son of King Binnya E Law had a rival in his half-cousin Binnya U to be heir-apparent. He died of smallpox, and did not succeed his father as king.

== Brief ==
Binnya E Laung was born to Prince Binnya E Law and a concubine in the 1320s. E Laung was probably born in Pegu (or less probably in Sittaung), the towns where his father was governor. (Note: Per (Pan Hla 2005: 42), E Law was governor of Sittaung and later Pegu prior to his accession as king in 1330. Given that E Laung was still young child, he was probably born in Pegu.) He was a still a young child when his father brought him to the capital Martaban (Mottama). His father had been summoned by Queen Sanda Min Hla to take over the throne. But E Law did not bring E Laung's mother, a concubine, to Martaban. (Note: According to the chronicle Razadarit Ayedawbon (Pan Hla 2005: 42), E Law did not bring any concubines to Martaban because he was concerned that his half-sister and new chief queen Sanda Min Hla, who had engineered the deaths of the previous two kings, might get into a jealous rage.)

As a result, E Laung grew up without his biological mother. He was raised by a nanny named Hnin An May Han. Although he was the only son of E Law, the prince was not officially appointed as heir-apparent. E Laung had a rival in his half-cousin Binnya U, son of Sanda Min Hla. The king was careful not to antagonize his chief queen, and never officially announced who his heir was. The ambiguity disturbed E Laung. One day, he organized an attack on U's camp. The two princes fought on elephant-back, and E Laung was defeated. The king finally chose sides, and arrested U. The king freed U only after intense protestations by queens Sanda Min Hla and Tala Shin Saw Bok, mother and aunt of U.

At any rate, E Laung died shortly after from smallpox.

== Bibliography ==
- Pan Hla, Nai (2005) [1968]. Razadarit Ayedawbon (in Burmese) (8th printing ed.). Yangon: Armanthit Sarpay.

Binnya E Laung Martaban Born: 1320s Died: 1340s
Royal titles
Preceded by Saw Zein	Heir Presumptive of Martaban; 1330–1340s	Succeeded by Binnya U
