= Binnya E Law =

Binnya E Law ဗညားအဲလော

King of Martaban
- Reign: c. June 1330 – late 1348
- Predecessor: Saw E
- Successor: Binnya U

Governor of Pegu
- Reign: c. late 1320s – c. June 1330
- Predecessor: Saw Zein (as king)
- Successor: ?
- Monarch: Saw Zein

Governor of Sittaung
- Reign: c. mid 1320s – c. late 1320s
- Predecessor: ?
- Successor: Smin Ngaw
- Monarch: Saw Zein
- Born: 13 March 1308; Wednesday, 5th waning of Late Tagu 669 ME; Martaban (Mottama); Martaban Kingdom
- Died: late 1348 (aged 40); 710 ME; Martaban; Martaban Kingdom
- Consort: Sanda Min Hla; Tala Shin Saw Bok
- Issue: Binnya E Laung
- House: Wareru
- Father: Hkun Law
- Religion: Theravada Buddhism

Binnya E Law (Burmese: ဗညားအဲလော, pronounced [bəɲá ʔɛ́ lɔ́]; 1308–1348/49) was king of Martaban from 1330 to 1348. Placed on the throne by his half-sister Queen Sanda Min Hla, this son of King Hkun Law defeated Sukhothai's invasion in 1330–1331, ending Martaban's tributary status to the Siamese kingdom.

The rest of his reign was largely uneventful except for the fierce rivalry between E Law's son Binnya E Laung and Sanda Min Hla's son Binnya U. The king died soon after his son's death, and was succeeded by Binnya U.

== Early life ==
Binnya E Law was a son of King Hkun Law, and a nephew of King Wareru, the dynasty's founder. He was born on 13 March 1308. (Note: (Pan Hla 2005: 44): Wednesday, 5th waning of Late Tagu 669 ME = 13 March 1308 per (Eade 1989: 106).) E Law only three years old in March 1311 when his father was assassinated in a coup organized by his aunt Princess Hnin U Yaing and her husband Gov. Min Bala of Myaungmya. The couple placed their eldest son Saw O (r. 1311–1323) on the throne but spared the children of Hkun Law. E Law had two half-sisters Sanda Min Hla and Tala Shin Saw Bok.

In the following years, E Law kept a low profile, and gained the trust of O's successor King Saw Zein (r. 1323–1330). Zein, who was E Law's first cousin and brother-in-law, first appointed E Law as governor of Sittaung and later governor of Pegu (Bago) by the late 1320s.

== Reign ==
=== Accession ===
In 1330, E Law unexpectedly became king of Martaban. Circa April of that year, King Saw Zein was assassinated by Zein Pun, one of his senior officers. The king's chief queen Sanda Min Hla staged a counter coup a week later, and had the usurper executed. Queen Sanda then placed Saw E, son of King Saw O, on the throne, and made herself his chief queen. But the 16-year-old king quickly ran afoul of the powerful queen, and was poisoned 49 days later and died.

Queen Sanda now summoned her half-brother E Law to take over the throne. The chronicle Razadarit Ayedawbon relates that E Law was wary of his sister, and reluctantly came to Martaban (Mottama) by ship. He did not bring any of his concubines, and brought only his son Binnya E Laung. At Martaban, he was consecrated king with Sanda Min Hla as his chief queen. The 22-year-old king also raised his other half-sister Tala Shin Saw Bok (Sanda Min Hla's younger sister) as queen. It was c. June 1330. (Note: Based on the reporting by the Razadarit Ayedawbon, he became king sometime between 23 May 1330 and 14 July 1330. Per (Pan Hla 2005: 41), King Saw Zein died in 692 ME, which began on 29 March 1330. Because Zein's two successors reigned for 7 and 49 days respectively, the earliest E Law could have become king is 56 days since the new year's day, or 23 May 1330. Furthermore, since Saw Zein died at age 26 (27th year), the latest he could have died is 3rd waxing of Nayon 692 ME (20 May 1330), the day before he would have turned 27 (entered his 28th year). That means, the latest date E Law could have ascended the throne is 14 July 1330, 56 days after 20 May 1330.)

=== War with Sukhothai ===
E Law's immediate task was to contain the fallout from E's assassination. King Loe Thai of Sukhothai was greatly angered by the assassination of his grandson, and considered the brief truce achieved during E's short reign null and void. (Prior to E's restoration of ties, (Note: Razadarit Ayedawbon (Pan Hla 2005: 43) calls the relationship an alliance but (Phayare 1967: 67) calls it "subordination" to "Siam" [Sukhothai].) Martaban had been at war with its erstwhile overlord throughout the 1320s over the control of the Tenasserim coast. While Martaban took the coast down to the Tenasserim town in 1321, Sukhothai had been on the offensive since the mid-1320s, and retaken the coast up to Tavoy (Dawei) by 1330.) Martaban fully expected an invasion after the rainy season. The regime ordered defensive preparations along the expected invasion route: Sittaung, Donwun and Martaban.

Preparations paid off. According to the Razadarit, when four Sukhothai regiments invaded along the expected route, they faced heavy resistance from Martanban defenses. Although Sukhothai troops eventually took Sittaung and Donwun, they were a spent force by then. Nonetheless, the depleted invasion army decided to march on to Martaban. It turned out to be a bad decision. The outnumbered invaders were decisively defeated en route by two Martaban armies consisted of nine regiments. E Law personally commanded one of the two armies. Only a few invaders escaped the carnage. So decisive was the defeat that Sukhothai would not send another invasion force. At any rate, Sukhothai and its successor Ayutthaya continued to claim Martaban and Moulmein as its possessions. (Note: (Phayre 1967: 66, footnote 1): Ayutthaya at its founding in 1350 claimed the entire Tenasserim coast from Tenasserim town in the south to Tavoy, Moulmein and Martaban in the north. (Phayre 1967: 66, footnote 1) does not accept that Martaban and Moulmein were subject to Ayutthaya. (Harvey 1925: 111) considers Tavoy to be the southern "frontier" between the two kingdoms.)

=== Post-war period ===
The war with Sukhothai was costly. The fighting had destroyed the farms and able men throughout the region, and the country faced a famine. So chaotic were the conditions that one of the northern Burmese-speaking states may have raided Pegu. (Note: The Razadarit Ayedawbon (Pan Hla 2005: 43) states that Pagan (Bagan), taking advantage of the chaos, attacked Pegu. But the Pagan Kingdom had not existed since 1297, de facto, and since 1313, de jure. The attack, if occurred, must have come from either Prome or Toungoo, the two nominal vassal states of Pinya that bordered the Pegu province of Martaban. The event is not recorded in any of the main Burmese chronicles.) But Upper Burma itself was divided into multiple power centers, and was in no position to pose an existential threat to E Law's Mon-speaking fully independent kingdom.

The rest of E Law's reign was largely non-eventful. He may still have ruled in the shadow of Sanda Min Hla. He did not designate his only son E Laung heir-apparent as Sanda Min Hla's only son Binnya U also eyed the throne. The rivalry between the princes escalated in the 1340s when E Laung's health declined. The princes ended up fighting each other in an elephant-back duel in which U defeated E Laung. The king was furious, and had U arrested. But he released U at the request of Sanda Min Hla and Tala Shin Saw Bok. His son died from smallpox soon after.

== Death ==
The king died at age 40 in 1348/49 (or 44 in 1353/54). (Note: The Razadarit Ayedawbon chronicle (Pan Hla 2005: 44) states he died in 710 ME (29 March 1348 to 28 March 1349) in his 41st year (at age 40), after 18 years of reign. Per (Pan Hla 2005: 44–48), the successor Binnya U faced external and internal enemies before emerging as the undisputed ruler by 715 ME (29 March 1353 to 28 March 1354). But (Mon Yazawin 1922: 45) says that E Law reigned for 23 years and died in his 45th year (at age 44). (Phayre 1967: 67) accepts 18 years of reign and the 1348 death while (Harvey 1925: 368) accepts 23 years and 1353. (Htin Aung 1967: 338) says E Law died in an unknown year; he was followed by various claimants to the throne; and Binnya U emerged king in 1353. Pan Hla, the editor of the original 1968 edition of Razadarit Ayedawbon, like Phayre, accepts the chronicle's version.) He was succeeded by Binnya U.

== Bibliography ==
- Harvey, G. E. (1925). History of Burma: From the Earliest Times to 10 March 1824. London: Frank Cass & Co. Ltd.
- Htin Aung, Maung (1967). A History of Burma. New York and London: Cambridge University Press.
- Pan Hla, Nai (2005) [1968]. Razadarit Ayedawbon (in Burmese) (8th printing ed.). Yangon: Armanthit Sarpay.
- Phayre, Lt. Gen. Sir Arthur P. (1967) [1883]. History of Burma. London: Susil Gupta.
- Shwe Naw, ed. (1922) [1785]. Mon Yazawin (Shwe Naw) (in Burmese). Translated by Shwe Naw. Yangon: Burma Publishing Workers Association Press.

Binnya E Law Wareru Born: 13 March 1308 Died: c. late 1348
Regnal titles
Preceded by Saw E	King of Martaban; 1330–1348/49	Succeeded by Binnya U
Royal titles
Preceded by Saw Zein as king	Governor of Pegu late 1320s–1330	Unknown
Unknown	Governor of Sittaung mid 1320s–late 1320s	Succeeded by Smin Ngaw
