= Sanda Min Hla =

Sanda Min Hla စန္ဒာမင်းလှ

Chief queen consort of Martaban
- Tenure: c. April 1330 – 1348/49
- Predecessor: unknown
- Successor: Sanda Min Hla II

Chief queen consort of Martaban
- Tenure: by 28 September 1323 – c. April 1330
- Predecessor: May Hnin Htapi
- Successor: unknown
- Born: c. 1300s Martaban (Mottama)
- Died: 1363/64; 725 ME; Martaban
- Spouse: Saw Zein (1323–1330); Saw E (1330); Binnya E Law (1330–1348/49)
- Issue: Mwei Ne; Maha Dewi; Binnya U
- House: Wareru
- Father: Hkun Law
- Religion: Theravada Buddhism

Sanda Min Hla (Burmese: စန္ဒာမင်းလှ, pronounced [sàɰ̃dà mɪ́ɰ̃ l̥a̰]; c. 1300s–1363/64) was the chief queen consort of three kings of Martaban, and the real palace power behind the throne. Her murder of her second husband King Saw E, grandson of the king of Sukhothai provoked an invasion from Sukhothai. Her third husband King Binnya E Law, whom she also placed on the throne, defeated the invasion.

== Early life ==
She was a daughter of King Hkun Law (r. 1307–1311), and niece of the dynasty founder King Wareru (r. 1287–1307). Her personal name was Hnin An Po (နှင်းအံပို; Burmese pronunciation: [n̥ɪ́ɰ̃ ʔàɰ̃ pò]). She had one full younger sister, Tala Shin Saw Bok, and at least one half brother, Binnya E Law.

In 1311, she lost her father who was assassinated in a coup led by Gov. Min Bala of Myaungmya, husband of her aunt Hnin U Yaing. Bala and U Yaing spared the children of Hkun Law. Nonetheless, they married her off to their son (and her first cousin) Saw Zein in the late 1310s. By 1323, she had three children with Zein: Mwei Ne, Mwei Na and Binnya U.

== Palace power ==
In 1323, Zein ascended the throne, and she became the chief queen with the title of Sanda Min Hla. After Saw Zein was assassinated in 1330, she emerged as the kingmaker. One week later, the queen organized a successful counter coup against the usurper Zein Pun, and put him to death. She then placed Saw E, nephew of Saw Zein and grandson of the king of Sukhothai, on the throne. Although E was her first cousin, once removed, she made herself his chief queen.

But she was soon dissatisfied with the 16-year-old E. Her dissatisfaction may have something to do with the young king's decision to renew the allegiance to his grandfather Loe Thai of Sukhothai. E's father was the first to declare independence from Sukhothai in 1317/18, and Saw Zein had fought wars with the Siamese kingdom over the control of the Tenasserim coast. It did not help that the young king spent much of his time with concubines. The powerful queen poisoned the youngster, just 49 days later. She anointed her half-brother Binnya E Law to the throne, and again made herself the chief queen. Her murder of Saw E greatly angered the king of Sukhothai. Sukhothai forces invaded in 1330–1331 but were defeated. Martaban's subordination to Sukhothai ceased.

She remained the chief queen until 1348. E Law was so concerned about the temper of his half sister that he left his concubines in Pegu (Bago). E Law also did not declare his own son Binnya E Laung as his heir-apparent; Sanda Min Hla's son Binnya U remained a serious contender to succeed E Law. When the rivalry between E Laung and U turned into a real fight, Sanda Min Hla shielded her son from the king's wrath. At any rate, her son became the heir presumptive as E Laung died soon after from smallpox. E Law also died soon after in 1348, and her son U ascended the throne.

The queen dowager died in 1363/64 during her son's reign.

== Bibliography ==
- Pan Hla, Nai (2005) [1968]. Razadarit Ayedawbon (in Burmese) (8th printing ed.). Yangon: Armanthit Sarpay.
- Phayre, Lt. Gen. Sir Arthur Purves (1967) [1883]. History of Burma. London: Susil Gupta.
- Shwe Naw, ed. (1922) [1785]. Mon Yazawin (in Burmese). Translated by Shwe Naw. Yangon: Burma Publishing Workers Association Press.

Sanda Min Hla Wareru Born: c. 1300s Died: 1363/64
Royal titles
Unknown	Chief queen consort of Martaban; 1330–1348/49	Succeeded by Sanda Min Hla II
Preceded by May Hnin Htapi	Chief queen consort of Martaban; 1323–1330	Unknown
