= Saw E =

Saw E စောအဲ

King of Martaban
- Reign: c. April – June 1330 (49 days)
- Predecessor: Zein Pun
- Successor: Binnya E Law
- Born: 1313/14; 675 ME; Martaban (Mottama); Martaban Kingdom
- Died: c. June 1330 (aged 16); 692 ME; Martaban (Mottama); Martaban Kingdom
- Consort: Sanda Min Hla
- House: Wareru
- Father: Saw O
- Mother: May Hnin Htapi
- Religion: Theravada Buddhism

Saw E Kan-Kaung (Burmese: စောအဲကံကောင်း, [sɔ́ ʔɛ́ ɡàɰ̃ ɡáʊɰ̃]; 1313/14–1330) was king of Martaban for 49 days in 1330. E was the last Martaban king to pledge allegiance to Sukhothai.

The eldest son of King Saw O (r. 1311–1323) was placed on the throne by Queen Sanda Min Hla, who made herself his chief queen. Although he had fought against Martaban's former overlord Sukhothai, after his accession, E quickly mended fences with his maternal grandfather King Loe Thai of Sukhothai. But Queen Sanda Min Hla was dissatisfied with the young king, and poisoned him seven weeks later. His assassination provoked an invasion by Sukhothai, which Sanda Min Hla and her new king Binnya E Law (r. 1330–1348) decisively defeated.

== Early life ==
Saw E Kan-Kaung was the elder child of Queen May Hnin Htapi and King Saw O of Martaban in 1313/14. (Note: The Razadarit Ayedawbon chronicle is inconsistent. The chronicle (Pan Hla 2005: 42) says Saw E was born in 665 ME (29 March 1303 to 27 March 1304), and died in his 27th year (at age 26) in 692 ME (29 March 1330 to 28 March 1331). But an earlier narrative in the same chronicle (Pan Hla 2005: 38–39) says that Saw E's parents were wedded after his father's accession on 6th waning of Tagu 673 ME (10 April 1311), meaning E could not have been born in 665 ME. Instead he may have been born in 675 ME (29 March 1313 to 28 March 1314).) His mother was a princess of Sukhothai. Their parents were wedded in 1311 in a marriage of state between Sukhothai and Martaban. He had one full younger sibling Princess May Hnin Aw-Kanya.

In his childhood years, the prince was the heir presumptive of then ascendant Mon-speaking kingdom. His father broke with his nominal overlord Sukhothai in 1317/18, (Note: (Mon Yazawin 1922: 44): Six years into Saw O's reign = 1317/18) and went on to seize Sukhothai's possessions in Lamphun and the Tenasserim coast by 1321. However, his father died at the height of success in September 1323. Since E was only about 10 years old, his 19-year-old paternal uncle Saw Zein ascended the throne.

== Tavoy campaign and imprisonment ==
According to the Razadarit Ayedawbon chronicle, E's relationship with his uncle nosedived after an unsuccessful campaign to retake Tavoy (Dawei) c. 1329–1330. Zein had faced several rebellions since his accession, and lost all of O's conquests back to Siam. Circa 1329, Zein appointed his nephew, then 15 or 16 years old, to lead the campaign to retake Tavoy on the Tenasserim coast. E was able to take Tavoy initially but could not hold on, and had to retreat. The king was furious, and sent E to prison near the frontier with Prome (Pyay).

E's prison stay was short. After the failed Tavoy campaign, Zein lost support among his vassals, and some of his officers. Circa April 1330, Zein was assassinated on the order of one of the king's most trusted officers Zein Pun. But the usurper himself was killed just a week later in a putsch organized by the fallen king's chief queen Sanda Min Hla. She freed E from prison, and come to Martaban to take over the throne.

== Reign ==
At Martaban, E was crowned king, with Sanda Min Hla as his chief queen. E was ambivalent about the queen as he was her first cousin, once removed. (His father Saw O and Sanda Min Hla were first cousins.) The 16-year-old king did not feel comfortable with Min Hla, whom he regarded as his aunt, as his spouse, and spent much time with concubines. Early in his reign, he or his court appeared to have repaired the relationship with Sukhothai. The Razadarit Ayedawbon chronicle describes the relationship as an alliance but may have been a renewal of "subordination" to Sukhothai.

Queen Sanda did not like the turn of events. She killed the young king by serving him a poisoned dish of meat (beef) stew. He ruled for just 49 days.

== Aftermath ==
The powerful queen then placed her half-brother Gov. Binnya E Law of Pegu (Bago) on the throne. She again made herself E Law's chief queen. The new regime then faced the wrath of the king of Sukhothai who was angered by her murder of Saw E. Sukhothai forces invaded in 1330–1331 but were decisively defeated.

== Bibliography ==
- Harvey, G. E. (1925). History of Burma: From the Earliest Times to 10 March 1824. London: Frank Cass & Co. Ltd.
- Pan Hla, Nai (2005) [1968]. Razadarit Ayedawbon (in Burmese) (8th printing ed.). Yangon: Armanthit Sarpay.
- Phayre, Lt. Gen. Sir Arthur P. (1967) [1883]. History of Burma. London: Susil Gupta.
- Shwe Naw, ed. (1922) [1785]. Mon Yazawin (Shwe Naw) (in Burmese). Translated by Shwe Naw. Yangon: Burma Publishing Workers Association Press.

Saw E Hanthawaddy Dynasty Born: 1313/14 Died: c. June 1330
Regnal titles
Preceded by Zein Pun	King of Martaban; 1330	Succeeded by Binnya E Law
