= List of heirs to the Burmese thrones =

This is a list of the individuals who were, at any given time, considered the next in line to succeed the Burmese monarch to inherit the throne of various Burmese kingdoms (849–1885). Those who actually succeeded at any future time are shown in bold.

== Pagan Kingdom ==
Monarch	Heir	Status	Relationship to Monarch	Became heir; reason	Ceased to be heir; reason	Next in succession
Pyinbya	**Tannet**	Heir apparent	son	859? father succeeded	904 succeeded	**Theinhko**; 934?–943
Sale Ngahkwe	**Theinhko**	Heir apparent	son	934? father succeeded	956 succeeded	**Sokkate**; 1021?–1038
Kyiso	**Sokkate**	Heir presumptive	brother	1021? father succeeded	1038 succeeded	**Saw Lu**; 1049?–1077
Anawrahta	**Saw Lu**	Heir apparent	son	1049? father succeeded	11 April 1077 succeeded	**Sithu I** 1090–1112/13, grandson
Kyansittha	**Sithu I**	Heir apparent	grandson	17 January 1090 grandfather succeeded	1112/1113 succeeded	Min Shin Saw c. 1117–1151, son
Alaungsithu	Min Shin Saw	Heir apparent	son	c. 1117 father succeeded	1151 exiled	**Narathu**; 1151–1167, brother
Alaungsithu	**Narathu**	Heir presumptive	son	1151 brother exiled	1167 brother assassinated	**Naratheinkha**; 1167 – c. February 1171, son
Narathu	**Naratheinkha**	Heir apparent	son	1167 father succeeded	c. February 1171 succeeded	**Sithu II** c. February 1171 – c. May 1174, brother
Naratheinkha	**Sithu II**	Heir presumptive	brother	c. February 1171 brother succeeded	c. May 1174 succeeded	**Htilominlo** ?–1211, son
Sithu II	**Htilominlo**	Heir apparent	son	? father succeeded	18 August 1211 succeeded	**Kyaswa** ?–1235, son
Htilominlo	Naratheinga Uzana	Heir apparent	son	? father succeeded	1235 died	Kyaswa; 1231–1235, brother
Htilominlo	**Kyaswa**	Heir apparent	son	? father succeeded	19 July 1235 brother died	**Uzana**; 1235–1251, son
Narathu	**Uzana**	Heir apparent	son	1235 father succeeded	1251 succeeded	**Narathihapate**; 1256, son
Uzana	Thihathu	Heir apparent	son	1251 father succeeded	May 1256 assassinated	Uzana of Bassein ?–1287, nephew
Narathihapate	Uzana of Bassein	Heir presumptive	son	? father succeeded	1 July 1287 assassinated	Theingapati; 1289–1297, nephew
Kyawswa	Theingapati	Heir apparent	son	30 May 1289 father succeeded	17 December 1297 assassinated	End of Pagan Dynasty

== Pinya Kingdom ==
Monarch	Heir	Status	Relationship to Monarch	Became heir; reason	Ceased to be heir; reason	Next in succession
Thihathu	**Uzana I**	Heir apparent	adopted son	7 February 1313; Formation of Pinya Kingdom	c. February 1325 succeeded	**Kyawswa I** 1325–1343, half-brother
Uzana I	**Kyawswa I**	Heir apparent	half-brother	c. February 1325 brother succeeded	29 March 1344 succeeded	**Kyawswa II**; 1343–1350, son
Kyawswa I	**Kyawswa II**	Heir apparent	son	29 March 1344 father succeeded	12 December 1350 succeeded	**Narathu**; 1350–1359, brother
Kyawswa II	**Narathu**	Heir presumptive	brother	12 December 1350 brother succeeded	19 March 1359 succeeded	**Uzana II**; 1364, brother
Narathu	**Uzana II**	Heir presumptive	brother	June 1364 brother deposed	June 1364 succeeded	End of Pinya Kingdom

== Sagaing Kingdom ==
Monarch	Heir	Status	Relationship to Monarch	Became heir; reason	Ceased to be heir; reason	Next in succession
Saw Yun	**Tarabya I**	Heir presumptive	half-brother	16 May 1315; Formation of Sagaing Kingdom	7 February 1327 succeeded	**Kyaswa**; 1327–1335, nephew
Tarabya I	**Kyaswa**	Heir apparent	uncle	7 February 1327 son of Saw Yun	1335 usurped	**Nawrahta Minye**; 1339–1348, brother
Kyaswa	**Nawrahta Minye**	Heir apparent	brother	1339 brother succeeded	1348 succeeded	**Tarabya II**; 1350, brother
Nawrahta Minye	**Tarabya II**	Heir apparent	brother	1348 brother succeeded	c. March 1350 succeeded	**Minbyauk Thihapate**; 1350–1352, brother-in-law
Tarabya II	**Minbyauk Thihapate**	Heir presumptive	brother-in-law	c. March 1350 brother-in-law succeeded	23 February 1352 succeeded	End of Sagaing Kingdom

== Ava Kingdom ==
Monarch	Heir	Status	Relationship to Monarch	Became heir; reason	Ceased to be heir; reason	Next in succession
Swa Saw Ke	**Tarabya**	Heir apparent	son	c. April 1385 father elected king	April 1400 succeeded	Kale Kye-Taung Nyo; April 1400, son
Tarabya	Kale Kye-Taung Nyo	Heir presumptive	son	April 1400 father succeeded	25 November 1400 uncle succeeded	Theiddat; 1400–1406, uncle
Minkhaung I	Theiddat	Heir presumptive	brother	25 November 1400 brother succeeded	c. December 1406 nephew anointed	Minye Kyawswa; 1406–1415, nephew
Minkhaung I	Minye Kyawswa	Heir apparent	son	1406 anointed	15 March 1415 killed in action	**Thihathu**; 1419–1421, brother
Minkhaung I	**Thihathu**	Heir apparent	son	1419 brother died	c. October 1421 succeeded	**Min Hla**; 1425, son
Thihathu	**Min Hla**	Heir presumptive	son	c. October 1421 father succeeded	August 1425 succeeded	**Minye Kyawswa I** 1426–1439
Mohnyin Thado	**Minye Kyawswa I**	Heir apparent	son	20 May 1426 father succeeded	by 26 April 1439 succeeded	**Narapati I** 1442–1442, brother
Minye Kyawswa I	**Narapati I**	Heir presumptive	brother	January 1442? brother succeeded	by 11 March 1442 succeeded	**Thihathura**; 14??–1468, son
Narapati I	**Thihathura**	Heir apparent	son	11 March 1442 father succeeded	24 July 1468 succeeded	**Minkhaung II**; 1468–1480, son
Thihathura	**Minkhaung II**	Heir apparent	son	24 July 1468 father succeeded	c. August 1480 succeeded	Thihathura II; 1480–1501, son
Minkhaung II	Thihathura II	Heir apparent	son	c. August 1480 father succeeded	1485 became joint-king	**Narapati II**; 1501, brother
Minkhaung II	**Narapati II**	Heir apparent	son	4 March 1501 brother died	7 April 1501 succeeded	Mingyi Nyo of Ava; 1519–1527
Narapati II	Mingyi Nyo of Ava	Heir apparent	son	1519 father succeeded	14 March 1527 father overthrown	**Narapati III**; 1542–1545
Hkonmaing	**Narapati III**	Heir apparent	son	June 1542 father elected	September 1545 succeeded	

== Ramanya ==
Monarch	Heir	Status	Relationship to Monarch	Became heir; reason	Ceased to be heir; reason	Next in succession
Wareru	**Hkun Law**	Heir presumptive	brother	30 January 1287 brother founded dynasty	c. 14 January 1307 succeeded	**Saw Zein**; 13??–1323, nephew
Saw O	**Saw Zein**	Heir apparent	brother	13?? brother succeeded	September 1323 succeeded	Binnya E Laung; 1330–1340s, nephew
Binnya E Law	Binnya E Laung	Heir presumptive	son	c. May 1330 father succeeded	1340s died	**Binnya U** 1340s–1348, cousin
Binnya E Law	**Binnya U**	Heir presumptive	nephew	1340s cousin died	1348 succeeded	Baw Ngan-Mohn; 1382–1384, nephew
Binnya U	Baw Ngan-Mohn	Heir apparent	son	by 1382 father succeeded	2 January 1384 brother succeeded	Baw Law Kyan Daw; 1384–1390, nephew
Razadarit	Baw Law Kyan Daw	Heir presumptive	son	4 January 1384 father succeeded	c. April 1390 executed	**Binnya Dhammaraza**; 1410s–1421, brother
Razadarit	**Binnya Dhammaraza**	Heir apparent	son	1410s brother died	1421 succeeded	**Binnya Ran I** 1421–1424, brother
Binnya Dhammaraza	**Binnya Ran I**	Heir apparent	brother	1421 brother succeeded	1424 succeeded	**Binnya Waru**; 14??–1446, nephew
Binnya Ran I	**Binnya Waru**	Heir apparent	nephew adopted son	14?? uncle succeeded	1446 succeeded	**Dhammazedi**; 1460–1471, brother-in-law
Shin Sawbu	**Dhammazedi**	Heir apparent	son-in-law	1460 mother-in-law succeeded	1471 succeeded	**Binnya Ran II**; 1471–1492, son
Dhammazedi	**Binnya Ran II**	Heir apparent	son	1483 father succeeded	1492 succeeded	**Yazadipadi**; 15??–1526, son
Binnya Ran II	**Yazadipadi**	Heir apparent	son	15?? father succeeded	1526 died on day of accession	

== Prome Kingdom ==
Monarch	Heir	Status	Relationship to Monarch	Became heir; reason	Ceased to be heir; reason	Next in succession
Thado Minsaw	**Bayin Htwe**	Heir apparent	son	? father founded kingdom	1526 brother succeeded	**Narapati**; 1526–1532, son
Bayin Htwe	**Narapati**	Heir apparent	son	1526 father dethroned	c. December 1532 succeeded	**Minkhaung**; 1532–1539, brother
Narapati	**Minkhaung**	Heir presumptive	brother	c. December 1532 uncle succeeded	c. February 1539 succeeded	

== Toungoo Dynasty ==
The dates after 1582 are according to the Gregorian calendar.

Monarch	Heir	Status	Relationship to Monarch	Became heir; reason	Ceased to be heir; reason	Next in succession
Mingyi Nyo	**Tabinshwehti**	Heir apparent	son	16 April 1516; Only son	24 November 1530 succeeded	**Bayinnaung**; 1542–1550, brother-in-law
Tabinshwehti	**Bayinnaung**	Heir presumptive	brother-in-law	April 1542 anointed	30 April 1550 succeeded	**Nanda**; 1551–1581, son
Bayinnaung	**Nanda**	Heir apparent	son	11 January 1551 father succeeded	10 October 1581 succeeded	Mingyi Swa; 1581–1593, son
Nanda	Mingyi Swa	Heir apparent	son	15 October 1581 father succeeded	8 February 1593 killed in action	Minye Kyawswa II; 1593–1599, brother
Nanda	Minye Kyawswa II	Heir apparent	son	29 December 1593 brother died	December 1599 defected	**Anaukpetlun**; 1603–1605, cousin
Nyaungyan	**Anaukpetlun**	Heir apparent	son	11 August 1603 father succeeded	5 November 1605 succeeded	**Thalun**; 1605–1628, brother
Anaukpetlun	**Thalun**	Heir apparent	brother	5 November 1605 father succeeded	9 July 1628 nephew succeeded	Minye Kyawswa III; 1635–1647, brother
Thalun	Minye Kyawswa	Heir apparent	brother	2 June 1635 brother succeeded	18 August 1647 died	**Pindale**; 1647–1648, nephew
Thalun	**Pindale**	Heir apparent	son	18 August 1647 uncle died	27 August 1648 succeeded	Minye Thihathu; 1648–1653
Pindale	Minye Thihathu	Heir apparent	brother	5 September 1648 brother succeeded	25 December 1653 died	Narazeya; 1654–1661, brother
Pindale	Narazeya	Heir apparent	son	30 January 1654 uncle died	3 June 1661 father deposed	**Narawara**; 1664–1672, cousin
Pye	**Narawara**	Heir apparent	son	1 June 1664 father succeeded	13 April 1672 succeeded	**Sanay**; 1688–1698, nephew
Minye Kyawhtin	**Sanay**	Heir apparent	son	8 September 1688 father succeeded	4 May 1698 succeeded	**Taninganway**; 1711–1714, son
Sanay	**Taninganway**	Heir apparent	son	1 November 1711 father succeeded	12 September 1714 succeeded	**Mahadhammaraza Dipadi**; 1727–1733, son
Taninganway	**Mahadhammaraza Dipadi**	Heir apparent	son	6 May 1727 elder brothers died	12 December 1733 succeeded	End of Toungoo Dynasty

== Konbaung Dynasty ==
Monarch	Heir	Status	Relationship to Monarch	Became heir; reason	Ceased to be heir; reason	Next in succession
Alaungpaya	**Naungdawgyi**	Heir apparent	son	29 February 1752; Formation of Konbaung Dynasty	11 May 1760 succeeded	**Hsinbyushin**; 1760–1763, brother
Naungdawgyi	**Hsinbyushin**	Heir presumptive	brother	11 May 1760 brother succeeded	28 November 1763 succeeded	**Singu**; 1763–1776, son
Hsinbyushin	**Singu**	Heir apparent	brother	28 November 1763 father succeeded	10 June 1776 succeeded	Pyinsi; 1776–1782, son
Singu	Pyinsi	Heir presumptive	son	10 June 1776 father succeeded	6 February 1782 killed	Thado Minsaw; 1783–1808, first cousin
Bodawpaya	Thado Minsaw	Heir apparent	son	13 July 1783 father succeeded	9 April 1808 died	**Bagyidaw**; 1808–1819, son
Bodawpaya	**Bagyidaw**	Heir apparent	son	17 April 1808 father died	5 June 1819 succeeded	**Setkya Mintha**; 1819–1837, son
Bagyidaw	Setkya Prince	Heir apparent	son	1819 father succeeded	4 April 1838 executed	**Tharrawaddy**; 1837–1842, uncle
Tharrawaddy	**Pagan**	Heir presumptive	son	August 1842 father succeeded	17 November 1846 succeeded	**Mindon**; 1846–1852, younger brother
Pagan	**Mindon**	Heir apparent	brother	17 November 1846 brother succeeded	18 February 1853 succeeded	Kanaung; 1852–1866, younger brother
Mindon	Kanaung	Heir apparent	brother	18 February 1853 brother succeeded	2 August 1866 assassinated	**Thibaw**; 1878, nephew
Mindon	**Thibaw**	Heir apparent	son	19 September 1878 elected	1 October 1878 succeeded	End of Konbaung Dynasty; End of Burmese monarchy

Thibaw Min was deposed and exiled in 1885. He died in exile in India in 1916. He was succeeded as head of the family by his daughter Myat Phaya (1925–1956). From 1956 to 2019, the claimant to the throne was Taw Phaya, her nephew and the second son of Princess Myat Phaya Galay. After Taw Phaya's death in 2019, it remains unclear if his son Richard Taw Phaya Myat Gyi or his cousin Soe Win is the claimant to the throne.

== Bibliography ==
- Harvey, G. E. (1925). History of Burma: From the Earliest Times to 10 March 1824. London: Frank Cass & Co. Ltd.
- Htin Aung, Maung (1967). A History of Burma. New York and London: Cambridge University Press.
- Kala, U (1720). Maha Yazawin (in Burmese). Vol. 1–3 (2006, 4th printing ed.). Yangon: Ya-Pyei Publishing.
- Maung Maung Tin, U (1905). Konbaung Set Yazawin (in Burmese). Vol. 1–3 (2004 ed.). Yangon: Department of Universities History Research, University of Yangon.
- Pan Hla, Nai (1968). Razadarit Ayedawbon (in Burmese) (8th printing, 2004 ed.). Yangon: Armanthit Sarpay.
- Royal Historical Commission of Burma (1832). Hmannan Yazawin (in Burmese). Vol. 1–3 (2003 ed.). Yangon: Ministry of Information, Myanmar.
- Sandamala Linkara, Ashin (1931). Rakhine Yazawinthit Kyan (in Burmese). Vol. 1–2 (1997 ed.). Yangon: Tetlan Sarpay.
- Than Tun (December 1959). "History of Burma: A.D. 1300–1400". Journal of Burma Research Society. XLII (II).
- Thaw Kaung, U (2010). Aspects of Myanmar History and Culture. Yangon: Gangaw Myaing Sarpay.
