= Binnya U =

Binnya U ဗညာဥူ ဗညားဦး

King of Martaban–Hanthawaddy
- Reign: 1348 – 2 January 1384
- Predecessor: Binnya E Law
- Successor: Razadarit
- Chief Minister: Pun-So (1348–1369); Zeik-Bye (1370s–1384)
- Born: c. November 1323 c. Nadaw 685 ME; Martaban (Mottama); Martaban Kingdom
- Died: 2 January 1384 (aged 60); Saturday, 10th waxing of Tabodwe 745 ME; Pegu (Bago); Hanthawaddy kingdom
- Consort: Sanda Min Hla II; Hnin An Daung; Sanda Dewi; Yaza Dewi; Thiri Maya Dewi
- Issue Detail: Tala Mi Thiri; Razadarit; Tala Mi Daw; Baw Ngan-Mohn
- House: Wareru
- Father: Saw Zein
- Mother: Sanda Min Hla
- Religion: Theravada Buddhism

Binnya U (Mon: ဗညာဥူ, Burmese: ဗညားဦး, Burmese pronunciation: [bəɲá ʔú]; also known as Hsinbyushin; 1323–1384) was king of Martaban–Hanthawaddy from 1348 to 1384. His reign was marked by several internal rebellions and external conflicts. He survived the initial rebellions and an invasion by Lan Na by 1353. But from 1364 onwards, his effective rule covered only the Pegu province, albeit the most strategic and powerful of the kingdom's three provinces. Constantly plagued by poor health, U increasingly relied on his sister Maha Dewi to govern. He formally handed her all his powers in 1383 while facing an open rebellion by his eldest son Binnya Nwe, who succeeded him as King Razadarit.

King Binnya U is best remembered in Burmese history as the father of King Razadarit. One enduring legacy of his reign was Pegu's (Bago's) emergence as the new power center in Lower Burma. The city would remain the capital of the Mon-speaking kingdom until the mid-16th century.

== Early life ==
Born c. late 1323, (Note: The Razadarit Ayedawbon chronicle (Pan Hla 2005: 161): Binnya U died in his 61st year (at age 60) on the 10th waxing of Tabodwe 745 ME (2 January 1384), meaning he was born between the 11th waxing of Tabodwe 684 ME (17 January 1323) and the 10th waxing of Tabodwe of 685 ME (5 January 1324). The chronicle (Pan Hla 2005: 40) suggests that his father was already king when U was born. Per (Pan Hla 2005: 41), Saw Zein became king in Thadingyut 685 ME (31 August 1323 to 28 September 1323). Thus, U was probably born sometime between Thadingyut (September 1323) and 10th waxing of Tabodwe 685 ME (5 January 1324).) Binnya U (Mon: ဗညာဥူ) was the only son of Queen Sanda Min Hla and King Saw Zein (r. 1323–1330) of Martaban. He was a grandnephew of the founder of the dynasty King Wareru. He had two elder sisters Mwei Ne and Mwei Na although the eldest sister Ne died young. He also had two younger half-siblings: Mi Ma-Hsan and Min Linka.

As the eldest son, U was the heir-presumptive until his father was assassinated in 1330. But he remained an important prince as his mother remained a powerful, feared kingmaker in the following years. After eliminating the usurper and the next successor in the following eight weeks, the queen placed her half-brother Binnya E Law on the throne, and made herself the chief queen. Probably in deference to the queen's sensitivities, E Law did not name an heir-apparent. The rivalry between E Law's son Binnya E Laung and U escalated in the 1340s when E Law's health declined. The half-cousins ended up fighting an elephant-back duel in which U defeated E Laung. The king was furious, and had U arrested. But Sanda Min Hla intervened, and E Law released U. At any rate, E Laung died from smallpox soon after, and U emerged as the heir-presumptive. E Law himself died in 1348, and the 25-year-old prince succeeded. He ascended the throne with the title of Hsinbyushin (ဆင်ဖြူရှင်, "Lord of the White Elephant") because he possessed a white elephant, a propitious symbol of Burmese monarchs.

== Early reign ==
=== Initial consolidation ===
The new king's hold on power was tenuous at best. He would spend the next five years consolidating power, overcoming external and internal threats. He bought the allegiance of the court through a series of marriage alliances. He himself married three daughters of Minister Than-Bon, and married off his sister Maha Dewi to Bon-Lan (later known by his title Byat Hta-Baik), son of Minister Than-Daw, and his half-brother Min Linka to the youngest daughter of Than-Bon.

=== Lan Na invasion (1351–1352) ===
His attempts to gain control of the vassal regions were not as successful. Although he was able to appoint Linka to the key governorship at Pegu (Bago), other key vassal rulers remained unimpressed. In 1351, the ruler of Donwun, about 100 km north of Martaban, openly revolted, and invited Lan Na forces to attack Martaban. In the dry season of 1351–52, an 8000-strong army from Lan Na (or a northern Tai-Shan state) invaded. (Note: (Fernquest 2006: 4–5): The Chiang Mai Chronicles have no record of this invasion. The actual invaders may have been from another northern Tai State.) The invasion force quickly overran the northern Martaban (present-day northern Mon State), and reached the outskirts of Martaban and Moulmein (Mawlamyaing).

But the invasion force could not overcome the defenses of Martaban. After the attackers had become a spent force, Binnya U himself led the counterattack atop his favorite white elephant, a highly propitious symbol of Burmese sovereigns, and successfully drove back the invasion force. U was so pleased by the victory and attributed the victory to the good fortune brought by his white elephant. He actually built a Buddhist pagoda, housing a holy relic he had received from Ceylon, at the hilltop where he atop his elephant began the counterattack.

=== Pegu rebellion (1352–1353) ===
U's job was not finished. His half-brother Gov. Min Linka of Pegu never sent any help during the invasion. In 1352–53, he sent his army to retake Pegu. The mission was successful. Linka was brought back to Martaban, and subsequently executed. Linka's wife, Mwei Daw, became a queen of U. He was now the undisputed ruler of the Mon-speaking kingdom.

=== Golden years (1353–1363) ===
The decade between 1353 and 1363 were the golden years for Binnya U. The country was at peace, and prosperity returned at least to the capital Martaban. He governed the kingdom with the help of his Chief Minister Pun So, and his brother-in-law Gov. Byat Hta-Baik of Dagon.

His regime was able to steer the kingdom out of the troubles that were enveloping his northern and eastern neighbors. Martaban's former overlord Sukhothai had been eclipsed by the emerging Ayutthaya Kingdom. The northern Pinya had no effective control over its southern vassals at Prome and Toungoo. U established direct relations with Toungoo's restive governor Theingaba. When Theingaba formally revolted against Pinya in 1358, he stayed on good terms with the rebel governor but did not want Toungoo to become too strong either. U readily gave shelter to Theingaba's son Pyanchi in Pegu when Pyanchi sought refuge. By the early 1360s, both Pinya and Sagaing kingdoms had been under repeated raids by the northern Shan state of Maw. Martaban was an island of stability. In 1362, the king raised the height of the Shwedagon Pagoda in Dagon to 20 meters (~66 feet).

== Middle reign ==
=== Coup ===
The end to Martaban's tranquil years came not from the widespread instabilities that surrounded the kingdom but from within. According to the chronicle Razadarit Ayedawbon, the main cause was the king's penchant for months-long elephant hunting trips away from the capital. U had been trying to find another "propitious" white elephant since the death of his first white elephant in 1354/55, believing that the late elephant was the reason he defeated the 1351–52 Lan Na invasion. In the dry season of 1363–64, he with over 2000 troops went on a hunting trip. Four months into the trip, c. February 1364, (Note: The Razadarit Ayedawbon (Pan Hla 2005: 48) says the hunting trip lasted about four months. The trip most probably began after the end of the Buddhist Lent on 22 September 1363 (full moon of Thadingyut 725 ME). It means the earliest he learned of the rebellion would be around January 1364. If he began the trip only after the rainy season was over, c. November 1363, he might have learned of the rebellion only in March 1364.) he received news that a coup led by princes Byattaba and his brother Laukpya had taken place at the capital. He rushed back to the capital, and ordered two separate missions to retake Martaban. But he did not have enough manpower, and both missions failed. In the Irrawaddy delta too, Laukpya's forces reigned supreme.

=== Donwun years (1364–1369) ===
U now set up camp at the dynasty's ancestral home Donwun. His realm had suddenly been reduced to the Pegu province and the northern tip of the Martaban province. His hold over the Pegu province was helped by the effective rule of his elder sister, Maha Dewi, whom he appointed governor of Dagon in 1364.

Lan Na continued to loom large in the politics of Lower Burma. When he heard that Byattaba was seeking Lan Na's help, U tried to repair relations with the Tai kingdom by sending his eldest daughter Tala Mi Thiri to Chiang Mai in a marriage of state. It apparently did the job as Lan Na did not interfere. (Queen Thiri would have a terrible time at Chiang Mai, and constantly urged her father to bring her back. U would bring her back c. 1371.)

What followed was a stalemate for the next five plus years. U did not try to regain the rebellious regions but neither did the rebel brothers try to dislodge U from Donwun. U heavily relied on his chief minister Pun-So, who kept the remaining territories intact. Then in 1369, Pun-So died. Taking advantage of the ensuing commotion, Byattba sent 700 warriors disguised as mourners, who managed to get inside Donwun, and seize U's palace. The king barely escaped to the nearby woods, and fled to Pegu, about 120 km northwest of Donwun, across the Bay of Martaban. Byattaba now controlled the entire Martaban province. Laukpya also raided Dala several times although U loyalists held the line.

== Reign at Pegu ==
=== Emergence of Pegu ===
U's realm was now reduced to just the Pegu (Bago) province (present-day southern Bago Region and Yangon Region). It turned out to be a fortuitous move for him. Not only was Pegu strategically located between the other two provinces but the province was also the most populous. Then ongoing sedimentation and silting since 1300 had increased the once swampy province's "agricultural and demographic potential". On the other hand, Martaban was located on the upper Tenasserim coast, and too close to the Tai kingdoms to the east. By 1370, Pegu was "ready to supplant Martaban as regional leader". Indeed, all subsequent monarchs of the Wareru dynasty would remain at the more strategic Pegu even after Martaban returned to the fold. The kingdom would be known as the Hanthawaddy Kingdom, after Pegu's classical name Hanthawaddy—the academic and popular name by which the dynasty which lasted from 1287 to 1539, inclusive of the Martaban years, is known. (Note: Colonial era scholarship (Harvey 1925: 368), (Htin Aung 1967: 338), et al simply call the entire period Hanthawaddy or Hanthawaddy Pegu even though Pegu became the capital only in 1369. (Lieberman 2003: 129) calls the kingdom Ramanya.)

=== Peace treaty with Ava ===
U's first actions at Pegu was to stabilize his reduced realm. In 1370–71, he quickly signed a peace treaty with King Swa Saw Ke of the emerging Ava Kingdom in the north. Both monarchs wanted a quiet border: U was dealing with his ongoing rebellions; Swa was focused on securing his northern border against the Maw Shans. Swa wanted U to acknowledge Toungoo (Taungoo) as part of Ava's sphere of influence. The Ava king did not trust his nominal vassal Gov. Pyanchi I of Toungoo, who was educated and lived in Pegu for several years. The two kings met in 1370/71 at the frontier, and signed a treaty demarcating the border. History shows that the treaty was an act of political expediency. The two kingdoms would fight a proxy war over Toungoo in 1375–76.

=== Treaty with the rebels ===
The treaty with Ava allowed U to focus on his defense of his remaining territory. He successfully fended off Laukpya's attempts to seize southern Pegu province, and his forces even retook Donwun, restoring the pre-1369 borders. But he paused when Byattaba and Laukpya again appealed to Lan Na. Though he was technically allied with King Kue Na of Lan Na through a marriage of state, his daughter Thiri had not gotten along with Kue Na, and wanted a divorce. Concerned by Chiang Mai's potential interference, U agreed to a truce with the brothers. The agreement called for U to pay the brothers 10 viss (16.33 kg) of gold and ten elephants in exchange for the brothers recognizing U as their sovereign as well as to broker an agreement with Kue Na to send Queen Thiri back. As the Razadarit Ayedawbon recounts, U realized the absurdity of the overlord paying tribute to the vassals but he ultimately decided to swallow his pride, and agreed to the terms. On the other hand, Byattaba and Laukpya realized that they needed Lan Na's support in order to neutralize U's stronger position at Pegu. The brothers sent 15 viss (24.49 kg) of gold in total to retain Chiang Mai's support. The king of Lan Na also sent back Tala Mi Thiri back.

=== Proxy war with Ava ===
The arrangement with the brothers lasted for the rest of U's reign. Byattaba and Laukpya ruled their provinces like sovereigns but left U alone while U had to be satisfied with their nominal allegiance. However, the treaty with Ava did not last. The cause was Toungoo. In 1375, Ava, coming off a decisive victory over the northern Shan state of Mohnyin, sought to impose tighter control over Toungoo. The ruler of Toungoo, Pyanchi I, sought Pegu's help. Despite the 1370/71 treaty with Ava, U ultimately decided to side with Pyanchi. Pegu sent a sizable army that included cavalry and elephant units led Commander Ma Sein.

What followed was a proxy war between Ava and Pegu in the dry season of 1375–76. Backed by the Pegu army, Toungoo held out for three months. According to a contemporary inscription, by the time the dust had settled, Ava had sent three expeditions against Toungoo, and caused widespread starvation in the region. Fortunately for Pegu, Ava would have its hands full with Toungoo for the next seven years, and leave Pegu alone until after U's death. For his part, U essentially stayed out of Toungoo for the rest of his reign. The Toungoo Yazawin chronicle reports a single embassy (by Gov. Phaungga of Toungoo in 1383) to Pegu between 1376 and 1384.

== Late reign ==
After the Toungoo war, the king's health markedly deteriorated. He gradually withdrew from administration, and handed increasing responsibilities to his sister Maha Dewi, culminating in her appointment as regent in 1383, and his eldest son Binnya Nwe's rebellion.

=== Rise of Maha Dewi ===
Binnya U had relied on his elder sister for advice at least since 1369. She had proven herself as an able governor of the key town of Dagon since 1364. When his health, in poor state at least since 1364, (Note: The first mention of Binnya U's ill health in the Razadarit Ayedawbon (Pan Hla 2005: 54) is when U decided to allow Zeya Thura to lead the second expedition against Martaban in early 1364.) deteriorated further in the 1370s, he began asking her to take on administrative duties. However, a powerful faction of the court, led by Chief Minister Zeik-Bye, secretly opposed her. Her enemies tried to undermine her by making public her alleged affair with a much younger married Smim Maru, who was also her nephew-in-law and U's son-in-law. But the king continued to trust his sister. By the early 1380s, she had emerged as the de facto ruler. The main opposition to her rule would come from her nephew and adopted son Binnya Nwe in 1383.

=== Binnya Nwe's rebellion ===
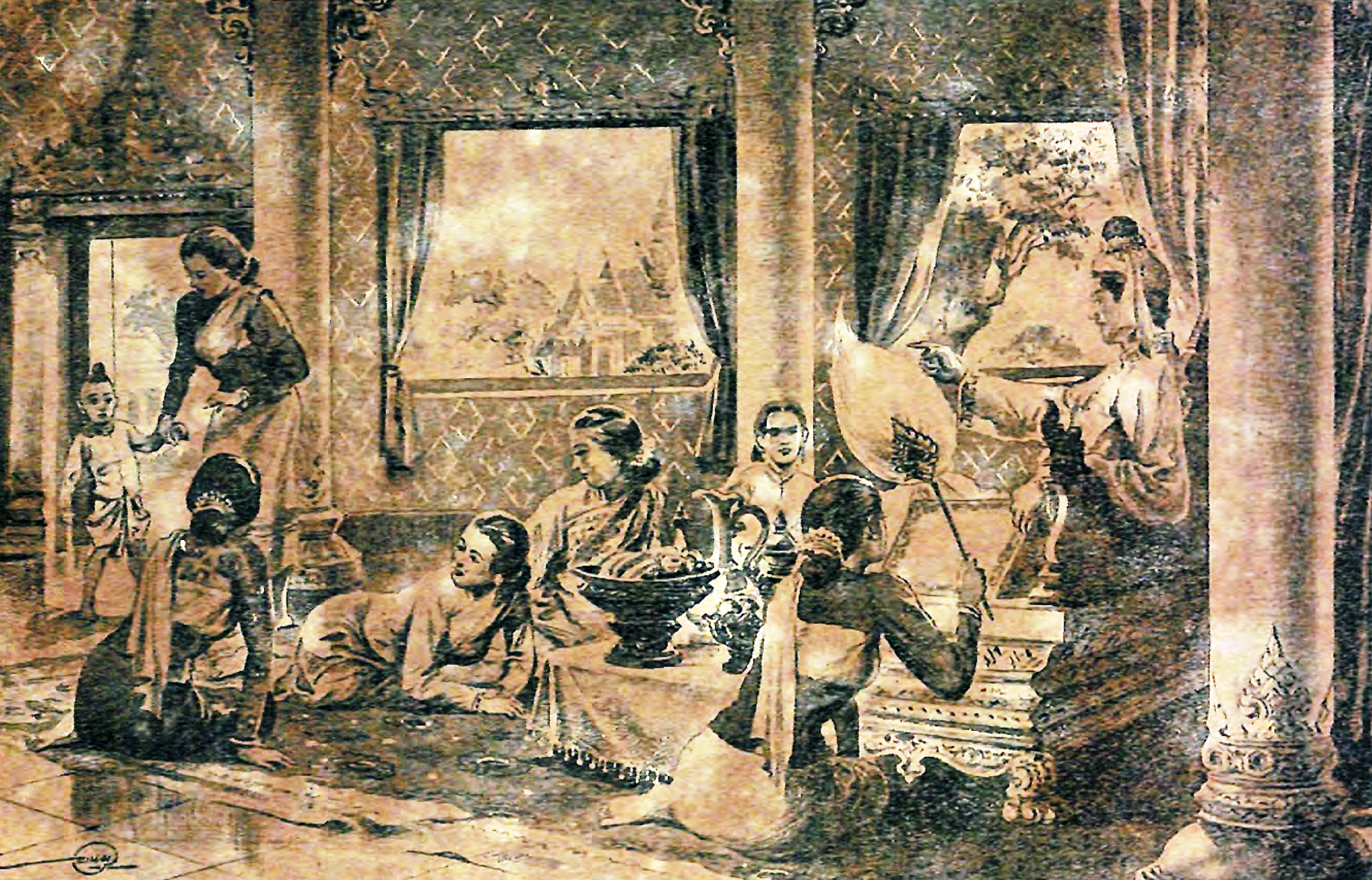
Binnya U frequently showed his disgust to his eldest son, Binnya Nwe. An illustration from Rachathirat, a Thai version of Razadarit Ayedawbon, 1946 printed edition.

According to the chronicle Razadarit Ayedawbon, the king and his eldest son were never close. Prince Nwe, whose mother died at childbirth, had been raised by his aunt Maha Dewi since his birth. Nwe was never his father's favorite. The king deemed him "ruthless", and once told his sister that Nwe was not to ascend the throne. U had chosen the younger son Baw Ngan-Mohn as heir-apparent. Nwe responded in kind. In 1382, he eloped with his half-sister Tala Mi Daw. U was aghast. When the young couple was soon caught, the king had Nwe imprisoned. Maha Dewi had to repeatedly plead with her brother to free Nwe, and allow the young couple to be married. U finally relented; she wedded the young couple.

Maha Dewi's best intentions would not go unpunished. On 5 May 1383, Nwe, with 30 followers, fled to Dagon, and seized the governor's residence there. (Note: (Pan Hla 2005: 94): Night of Tuesday, 3rd waxing of Nayon 745 ME = Monday, 4 May 1383. The day had turned to Tuesday, 5 May 1383.) Furious, U asked his sister to fix the situation. Advised by Zeik-Bye, Maha Dewi did not make much of the "rebellion". She believed her adopted son's conciliatory letter, saying he would soon return by August. It was only at the end of August that she decided to use force, after learning that Nwe had sent missions to enlist help from Martaban and Myaungmya.

=== Maha Dewi's regency ===
Meanwhile, U's health took a turn for the worse. He could not even attend meetings with the court anymore. In October, he officially handed power to his sister, giving her the right to raise the white umbrella, a symbol of Burmese sovereigns. (Note: Per (Pan Hla 2005: 129), Binnya U transferred power on or a few days before the army left for Dagon on 3rd waxing of Nadaw 745 ME (28 October 1383).) The act formalized what had been the reality for sometime. She was now referred to as Min Maha Dewi ("Queen Maha Dewi"). However, she continued to refer to her brother as the sovereign in her official edicts.

At any rate, she never won the court's support. With U on his deathbed, Zeik-Bye not so secretly undermined Maha Dewi's plans. Zeik-Bye was in secretly in league with Nwe, and provided the necessary intelligence. Undermined by Zeik-Bye, the Pegu army was driven back by Nwe's small army on 19 November 1383. (Note: (Pan Hla 2005: 154): 10th waning of Nadaw 745 ME = 19 Nov 1383) Indeed, by December, neither Maha Dewi nor U had any authority. When Nwe and his small army appeared outside Pegu's walls on 10 December 1383, (Note: (Pan Hla 2005: 156): Thursday, 12th waning of Pyatho 745 ME = Sunday, 20 December 1383. It was more likely Thursday, 2nd waning of Pyatho 745 ME (Thursday, 10 December 1383).) she could do nothing other than hunker down inside the city walls.

The stalemate ended with Binnya U's death on 2 January 1384. (Note: (Pan Hla 2005: 161): 10th waxing of Tabodwe 745 ME = 2 January 1384) Maru tried to rally the court but found no support. When he and his wife tried to flee, they were captured. On 4 January 1384, (Note: (Pan Hla 2005: 356, footnote 1): Monday, 12th waxing of Tabodwe 745 ME = 4 January 1384) the Zeik-Bye-led court handed the power to Nwe. The new king, known by the title of Razadarit, decided not to punish his adoptive mother, and reappointed her to her old post at Dagon but strictly in a ceremonial role.

== Family ==
The following a list of family members as reported in the Razadarit Ayedawbon.

Queen	Rank	Issue	Reference
Sanda Min Hla II	Chief queen (1348–c.1365)	none	
Hnin An Daung	Senior queen Chief queen (c.1365–1384)	Tala Mi Thiri	
Sanda Dewi	Senior queen	Tala Mi Daw	
Yaza Dewi	Queen	Baw Ngan-Mohn	
Thiri Maya Dewi	Queen (r. c. 1353–1368)	Razadarit	

== Bibliography ==
- Aung-Thwin, Michael A.; Maitrii Aung-Thwin (2012). A History of Myanmar Since Ancient Times (illustrated ed.). Honolulu: University of Hawai'i Press. ISBN 978-1-86189-901-9.
- Fernquest, Jon (Spring 2006). "Rajadhirat's Mask of Command: Military Leadership in Burma (c. 1348–1421)" (PDF). SBBR. 4 (1). Archived from the original (PDF) on 2019-08-01.
- Harvey, G. E. (1925). History of Burma: From the Earliest Times to 10 March 1824. London: Frank Cass & Co. Ltd.
- Htin Aung, Maung (1967). A History of Burma. New York and London: Cambridge University Press.
- Kala, U (2006) [1724]. Maha Yazawin (in Burmese). Vol. 1–3 (4th printing ed.). Yangon: Ya-Pyei Publishing.
- Lieberman, Victor B. (2003). Strange Parallels: Southeast Asia in Global Context, c. 800–1830, volume 1, Integration on the Mainland. Cambridge University Press. ISBN 978-0-521-80496-7.
- Maha Sithu (2012) [1798]. Kyaw Win; Thein Hlaing (eds.). Yazawin Thit (in Burmese). Vol. 1–3 (2nd ed.). Yangon: Ya-Pyei Publishing.
- Pan Hla, Nai (2005) [1968]. Razadarit Ayedawbon (in Burmese) (8th printing ed.). Yangon: Armanthit Sarpay.
- Phayre, Lt. Gen. Sir Arthur P. (1967) [1883]. History of Burma. London: Susil Gupta.
- Royal Historical Commission of Burma (2003) [1832]. Hmannan Yazawin (in Burmese). Vol. 1–3. Yangon: Ministry of Information, Myanmar.
- Schmidt, P.W. (1906). "Slapat des Ragawan der Königsgeschichte". Die äthiopischen Handschriften der K.K. Hofbibliothek zu Wien (in German). 151. Vienna: Alfred Hölder.
- Shorto, H.L. (1963). "The 32 "Myos" in the Medieval Mon Kingdom". Bulletin of the School of Oriental and African Studies, University of London. 26 (3). Cambridge University Press: 572–591. doi:10.1017/s0041977x00070336. JSTOR 611567.
- Than Tun (December 1959). "History of Burma: A.D. 1300–1400". Journal of Burma Research Society. XLII (II).

Binnya U Hanthawaddy Dynasty Born: late 1323 Died: 2 January 1384
Regnal titles
Preceded by Binnya E Law	King of Hanthawaddy; 1348 – 2 January 1384	Succeeded by Razadarit
Royal titles
Preceded by Binnya E Laung	Heir to the Hanthawaddy Throne; 1323–1330; 1340s–1348	Succeeded by Baw Ngan-Mohn
