= Mwei Ma-Gu-Thauk =

Thiri Yaza Dewi Mwei Ma-Gu-Thauk သီရိရာဇာဒေဝီ မွေ့မဂူသောက်

Queen of Hanthawaddy
- Tenure: c. 1350 – 2 January 1384
- Born: c. 1330s Byat-Laing, Martaban Kingdom
- Spouse: Binnya U (c. 1350?–1384)
- Issue: Baw Ngan-Mohn
- House: Hanthawaddy Pegu
- Religion: Theravada Buddhism

Thiri Yaza Dewi Mwei Ma-Gu-Thauk (Burmese: သီရိရာဇာဒေဝီ မွေ့မဂူသောက်, pronounced [θìɹḭ jàzà dèwì mwḛ mə gù θaʊ̯ʔ]) was a principal queen of King Binnya U of Hanthawaddy. She was the mother of Prince Baw Ngan-Mohn, the heir-apparent during the late reign of Binnya U.

== Brief ==
According to the chronicle Razadarit Ayedawbon, she was a commoner village girl from the village of Byat-Laing, north of then capital Martaban (Mottama). One day, Binnya U was returning from an elephant hunting trip, and stopped by at Byat-Laing, and saw her. Taken by her beauty, the king made her his concubine. Her Mon language name Mwei Ma-Gu-Thauk (or Hla Hteik-Khaung in Burmese) means "Epitome of Beauty".

The king was extremely fond of her. She later became a queen with the title of Thiri Yaza Dewi. (Note: Her full title per Razadarit Ayedawbon (Pan Hla 2005: 62) was Thiri Yaza Dewi although she is usually referred to as Yaza Dewi elsewhere in the chronicle.) She bore a son, Baw Ngan-Mohn, about two decades later. The king was fond of Ngan-Mohn, and made him the heir-apparent of the kingdom, by 1382. But she never became the Queen Mother. In 1384, Binnya U died, and Prince Binnya Nwe seized the throne with the help of the court. Nwe, now known as King Razadarit imprisoned Ngan-Mohn, and ordered him executed in 1389/90.

She was also known as the Queen of Pegu because she donated a monastery at the Gu-Nin village near Pegu.

== Bibliography ==
- Pan Hla, Nai (2005) [1968]. Razadarit Ayedawbon (in Burmese) (8th printing ed.). Yangon: Armanthit Sarpay.

Mwei Ma-Gu-Thauk Hanthawaddy Dynasty
Royal titles
Preceded by	Queen of Hanthawaddy c. 1350 – 2 January 1384	Succeeded by
