= Saw O =

Saw O စောအို
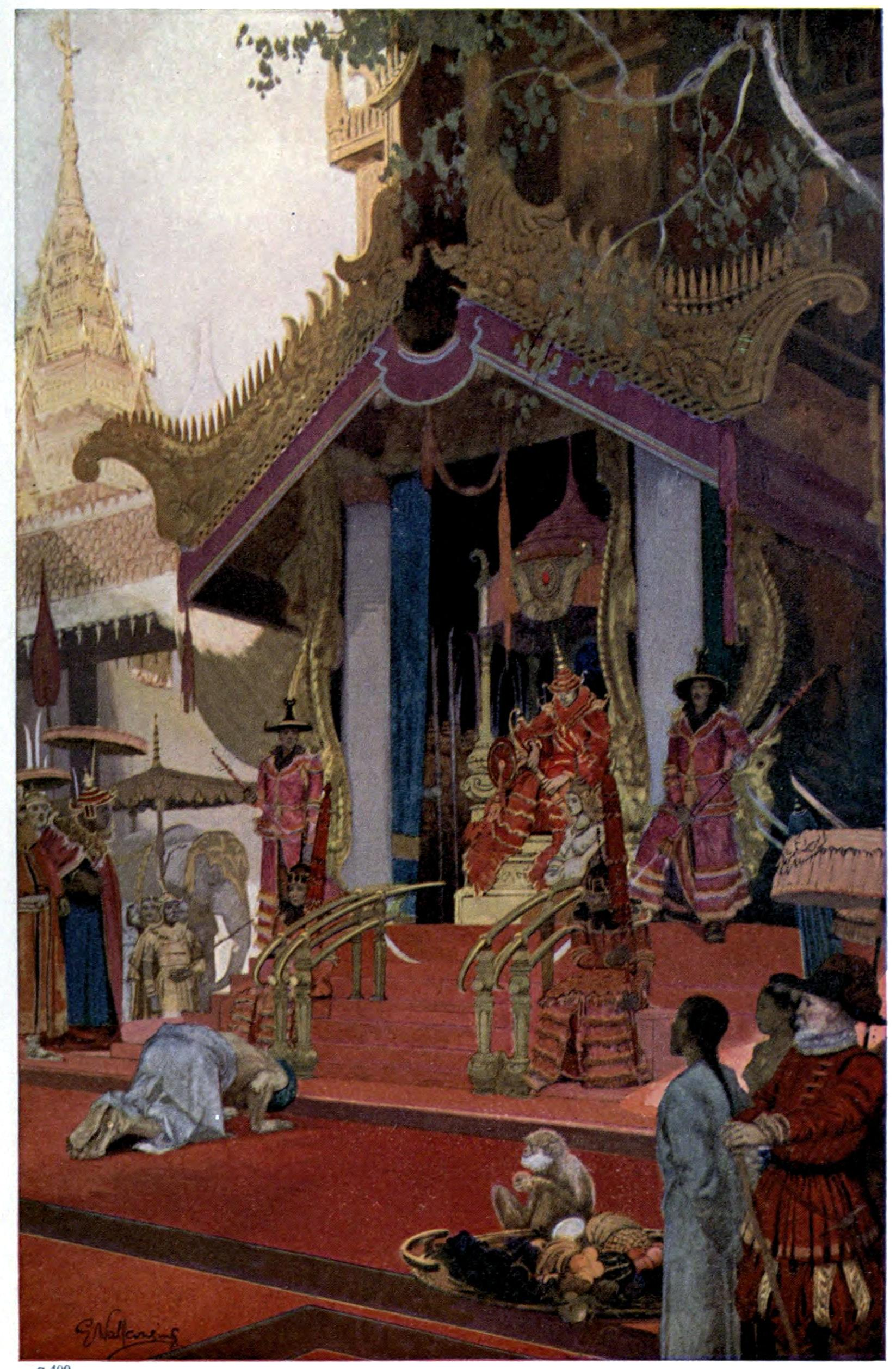

King of Martaban
- Reign: 10 April 1311 – September 1323
- Predecessor: Hkun Law
- Successor: Saw Zein
- Born: 1284; 646 ME; Tagaw Wun; Pagan Empire
- Died: September 1323 (aged 39); Thadingyut 685 ME; Martaban (Mottama); Martaban Kingdom
- Consort: May Hnin Htapi
- Issue Detail: Saw E May Hnin Aw-Kanya
- House: Wareru
- Father: Min Bala
- Mother: Hnin U Yaing
- Religion: Theravada Buddhism

Saw O (Burmese: စောအို, pronounced [sɔ́ ʔò]; also known as Saw Aw (စောအော, [sɔ́ ʔɔ́]); 1284–1323) was king of Martaban from 1311 to 1323. He transformed Martaban into a truly independent kingdom by successfully breaking with its hitherto nominal overlord Sukhothai.

He was put on the throne by his parents Gov. Min Bala of Myaungmya and Princess Hnin U Yaing, who had staged a coup against King Hkun Law. O emerged only after his father's death in the mid-to-late 1310s. He successfully broke with Sukhothai in 1317/18, and went on to capture Lamphun and the Tenasserim coast by 1321.

== Early life ==
Born in 1284, (Note: He was born sometime between 6th waning of Tagu 646 ME (7 April 1284) and the end of Thadingyut 646 ME (9 October 1284). The Razadarit Ayedawbon chronicle (Pan Hla 2005: 39) says he ascended the throne on Saturday, 6th waning of Tagu 673 ME (10 April 1311) in his 27th year (at age 26), meaning he was born after 6th waning of Tagu 646 ME (7 April 1284). But it also says he died in Thadingyut 685 ME (31 August 1323 to 28 September 1323) in his 41st year (age 40), meaning he was born in 1283/84. But 41st year is a typographical error; he could not have been in his 41st year in Thadingyut 685 ME. The Burmese numerals ၀ (0) and ၁ (1) are similar, and can be mis-copied. He likely died in his 40th year, at age 39. This means he was born by the end of Thadingyut 646 ME (9 October 1284).) Saw O was the eldest son of Hnin U Yaing and Min Bala. His mother was the sister of Ma Gadu—a commoner who had seized the governorship of Martaban (Mottama) in 1285. O became in a royal in 1287 when his uncle Gadu, styled as King Wareru, successfully declared independence from the Pagan Empire. The young boy's name gained the royal honorific "Saw"—reported as Saw O (စောအို) as well as Saw Aw (စောအော). (Note: Saw O per the Mon Yazawin (1922: 44) and Saw Aw per the Razadarit Ayedawbon (Pan Hla 2005: 37).)

The young prince likely moved with his family to Myaungmya, a key port in the Irrawaddy delta, where his father became governor, perhaps in the mid-1290s. (Note: Per (Pan Hla 2005: 37), O's father was known as Smim Myaungmya, "Lord of Myaungmya". The earliest Bala could have been Lord of Myaungmya was in the mid-1290s. Per (Harvey 1925: 110), Wareru went on to consolidate all three Mon-speaking regions of Lower Burma by 1296.) Then in 1311, the 26-year-old prince was put on the Martaban throne by his parents.

== Reign ==
=== Accession ===
O's parents had been plotting to overthrow King Hkun Law who succeeded Wareru in 1307. In March 1311, Bala and U Yaing staged a palace coup while Law was out on an elephant hunting trip. Bala's troops killed the king upon his return. Bala initially wanted to proclaim himself king. But U Yaing objected, saying that Bala was too old already, and that their eldest son, as nephew of Wareru, would stand a better chance at gaining the support of the vassals. (O had two full younger brothers.) During the deliberations, the throne was vacant for at least two weeks, perhaps even longer. (Note: Since Hkun Law was 56 (in his 57th year) at his death, he must have died by 6th waxing of Late Tagu 672 ME (26 March 1311). Per (Pan Hla 2005: 39), Saw O became king on Saturday, 6th waxing of Tagu 673 ME (10 April 1311).) Bala finally yielded to his wife's demand, and O ascended the throne on 10 April 1311.

=== Early reign ===
One of the first acts of his reign was to seek recognition from Martaban's overlord Sukhothai. The king of Sukhothai gave him recognition with the title of Saw Thin Maung, and sent his daughter May Hnin Htapi in a marriage of state. (The king of Sukhothai was either Loe Thai or his father King Ram Khamhaeng.)

Still, O was king in name only. His father remained the actual power behind the throne. The Razadarit Ayedawbon chronicle reports that the Lord of Myaungmya managed all affairs related to the kingdom, from his own "palace" at a nearby hill outside Martaban. Bala and U Yaing both died from old age in the mid-to-late 1310s. (Note: Bala and U Yaing likely died sometime between 1314 and 1319. (Pan Hla 2005: 38): Bala and U Yaing both died after their two grandchildren Saw E and May Hnin Aw-Kanya were born, and fore 682 ME (1320/21). Since Saw E was born in 1313, Aw-Kanya was likely born in 1314 or later.)

=== Break with Sukhothai ===
By 1317/18, O had emerged from his father's shadows. With his northern frontier with Pinya quiet, he considered challenging Sukhothai. He broke with his overlord six years into his reign. (Chronicles do not state why O, married to a Siamese princess, suddenly decided to challenge his nominal overlord. According to Cœdès, King Ram Khamhaeng died "shortly before 1318", not 1299 as reported by the Chinese records. If Cœdès's conjecture is correct, O may have decided not to pledge allegiance to Khamhaeng's successor Loe Thai.)

At any rate, he attacked Sukhothai's western vassals, and went on to seize Lamphun region south of Chiang Mai by 1320/21. (Note: Per (Pan Hla 2005: 38), he seized Labon in 1320/21 (682 ME). (Harvey 1925: 111) translates Labon as Lamphun south of Chiang Mai.) Emboldened by success, he next targeted Sukhothai's southern possessions on the Tenasserim coast, taking Tavoy (Dawei) and Tenasserim (Taninthayi) in the following dry season. He was so pleased with the victory that he built a palace in the Tenasserim town, and spent time in his newly acquired region.

The kingdom of Martaban was now truly independent. The rest of the reign was peaceful. He faced no internal or external threats. The king died shortly after in September 1323; he was 39. (Note: The Razadarit Ayedawbon chronicle (Pan Hla 2005: 39, 41) says he ascended the throne on Saturday, 6th waning of Tagu 673 ME (10 April 1311) in his 27th year, and died in Thadingyut 685 ME (31 August 1323 to 28 September 1323) in his 41st year (age 40). But 41st year clearly is a typographical error. The Burmese numerals ၀ (0) and ၁ (1) are similar, and can be mis-copied. He died in his 40th year (at age 39).) He was succeeded by his younger brother Saw Zein.

== Family ==
Saw O had a son and a daughter with May Hnin Htapi: Saw E and May Hnin Aw-Kanya.

== Bibliography ==
- Cœdès, George (1968). Walter F. Vella (ed.). The Indianized States of Southeast Asia. trans. Susan Brown Cowing. University of Hawaii Press. ISBN 978-0-8248-0368-1.
- Harvey, G. E. (1925). History of Burma: From the Earliest Times to 10 March 1824. London: Frank Cass & Co. Ltd.
- Pan Hla, Nai (2005) [1968]. Razadarit Ayedawbon (in Burmese) (8th printing ed.). Yangon: Armanthit Sarpay.
- Phayre, Lt. Gen. Sir Arthur P. (1967) [1883]. History of Burma. London: Susil Gupta.
- Shwe Naw, ed. (1922) [1785]. Mon Yazawin (Shwe Naw) (in Burmese). Translated by Shwe Naw. Yangon: Burma Publishing Workers Association Press.

Saw O Wareru Born: c. July 1284 Died: by 28 September 1323
Regnal titles
Preceded by Hkun Law	King of Martaban; 10 April 1311 – September 1323	Succeeded by Saw Zein
