= Baw Ngan-Mohn =

Baw Ngan-Mohn ဘောငံမုန်

Heir Apparent of Hanthawaddy
- Reign: by 1382 – 2 January 1384
- Predecessor: Binnya U
- Successor: Baw Law Kyan Daw (Heir Presumptive)
- Born: c. 1370; Pegu (Bago), Hanthawaddy kingdom
- Died: 1389/90; 751 ME; Pegu, Hanthawaddy kingdom
- House: Hanthawaddy
- Father: Binnya U
- Mother: Yaza Dewi
- Religion: Theravada Buddhism

Phaw Ngæm Mung ( PAW-ngam-mung, Mon: ဘဝ်ၚာံမုင်) or Baw Ngan-Mohn ( Burmese: ဘောငံမုန် Burmese pronunciation: [bɔ́ ŋàɴ mòʊ̯ɴ]; also knowm in classical Burmese as Baw Khome-Hmaing (ဘောခုံမှိုင်း, [bɔ́ kʰòʊɴ m̥áɪɴ]; c. 1370 – 1389/90), was heir-apparent of Hanthawaddy during the late reign of his father King Binnya U. After Binnya U's death in 1384, Ngan-Mohn was put in prison by his half-brother Razadarit who seized the throne with the help of the court. The prince was executed in 1389/90.

== Brief ==
He was born to Mwei Ma-Gu-Thauk and King Binnya U of Hanthawaddy. He was named Baw Ngan-Mohn (also known as Baw Khon-Hmaing). (Note: (Pan Hla 2005: 47, footnote 6): Baw Ngan-Mohn per Pak Lat; Baw Khon-Hmaing per Razadarit Ayedawbon.) His mother was a concubine but later became a queen with the title of Yaza Dewi. He was born c. 1370. (Note: Razadarit Ayedawbon (Pan Hla 2005: 185) says that Ngan-Mohn was younger than his half-brother Binnya Nwe (Razadarit) who was born in 1368.)

According to the Razadarit Ayedawbon chronicle, the handsome and composed Ngan-Mohn was his father's favorite. The king had anointed Ngan-Mohn as his heir-apparent certainly by 1382, perhaps even earlier. By 1383, the king's health had deteriorated to such a degree that several pretenders began jockeying for power. Binnya U had handed much of the power to his sister Gov. Maha Dewi of Dagon although some factions of the court secretly opposed her. Ngan-Mohn also had a serious rival in his elder half-brother Binnya Nwe, who had been persuaded by Minister Zeik-Bye to raise a rebellion. Ngan-Mohn too saw his aunt Maha Dewi as a threat, and began allying himself with Nwe.

In May 1383, Nwe went on to start a rebellion at Dagon, 60 km southwest of the capital Pegu. After the death of Binnya U in January 1384, the court handed the power to Nwe, who took the title Razadarit. Ngan-Mohn did not oppose Nwe's accession. The new king in turn awarded Ngan-Mohn the title of Binnya Dok (ဗညားဒုတ်, [bəɲá doʊ̯ʔ]).

Despite the initial gesture, Razadarit never trusted his younger half-brother. He could not forget their father's repeated statements that Ngan-Mohn was to be king. Soon after, he had Ngan-Mohn imprisoned. Ngan-Mohn spent the next five plus years in prison. The prince was executed in the dry season of 1389–90 on the order of Razadarit. At the time, Razadarit was in the Irrawaddy delta, fighting against the forces of Laukpya of Myaungmya. The king was concerned that Ngan-Mohn could have been freed, and may take over the capital Pegu while he was at the front. While returning to the base camp at Dala-Twante, he ordered Commander E Kaung Bein to execute Baw Ngan-Mohn. (Later in the same dry season, Razadarit ordered the execution of his own 7-year-old son Bawlawkyantaw because he was concerned that the boy might grow up to avenge for the suicide of his mother Queen Tala Mi Daw.)

== Bibliography ==
- Pan Hla, Nai (2005) [1968]. Razadarit Ayedawbon (in Burmese) (8th printing ed.). Yangon: Armanthit Sarpay.

Baw Ngan-Mohn Wareru Born: c. 1370 Died: 1389/90
Royal titles
Preceded by Binnya U	Heir Apparent of Hanthawaddy by 1382 – 2 January 1384	Succeeded by Baw Law Kyan Daw as heir-presumptive
