= Tala Shin Saw Bok =

Tala Shin Saw Bok တလရှင်စောဗုတ်

Queen of the Northern Palace of Martaban
- Tenure: 1330 – 1348
- Predecessor: May Hnin Htapi
- Successor: Hnin An Daung
- Born: c. 1300s Martaban (Mottama)? Martaban Kingdom
- Died: Unknown; Pegu (Bago)?
- Spouse: Binnya E Law
- House: Wareru
- Father: Hkun Law
- Religion: Theravada Buddhism

Tala Shin Saw Bok (Burmese: တလရှင်စောဗုတ်, pronounced [təla̰ ʃɪ̀ɰ̃ sɔ́ boʊ̯ʔ]) was a principal queen of King Binnya E Law of Martaban. She was a daughter of King Hkun Law and sister of Queen Sanda Min Hla. Bok was raised as queen by her half-brother E Law in 1348. The marriage was arranged by her elder sister Sanda Min Hla, who had just put E Law on the throne.

== Bibliography ==
- Pan Hla, Nai (2005) [1968]. Razadarit Ayedawbon (in Burmese) (8th printing ed.). Yangon: Armanthit Sarpay.

Tala Shin Saw Bok Martaban Born: c. 1300s
Royal titles
Preceded by May Hnin Htapi	Queen of the Northern Palace of Martaban; 1330–1348	Succeeded by Hnin An Daung
