= Min Bala of Myaungmya =

Min Bala မင်းဗလ

Governor of Myaungmya
- Reign: c. 1296 – 1310s
- Successor: Smim Za-E
- Born: Pagan Empire
- Died: by 1319; Martaban (Mottama); Martaban Kingdom
- Spouse: Hnin U Yaing
- Issue among others...: Saw O Saw Zein
- Religion: Theravada Buddhism

Min Bala (Burmese: မင်းဗလ, [mɪ́ɴ bəla̰]; also known as Smim Min Hla and Smim Myaungmya; d. 1310s) was governor of Myaungmya (in present-day Myanmar) from the 1290s to the 1310s. He was the father of kings Saw O (r. 1311–1323) and Saw Zein (r. 1323–1330) of Martaban. Bala was the power behind the throne during the early reign of Saw O.

In 1311, Bala successfully staged a coup against his brother-in-law King Hkun Law. He reluctantly gave up the throne at the urging of his wife Princess Hnin U Yaing, who had lobbied for their eldest son's accession. However, Bala essentially ruled the Mon-speaking kingdom like a sovereign from his own palace just outside the capital Martaban (Mottama) until his death.

== Rise to power ==
Chronicles do not mention his background. Based on the reporting of the chronicle Razadarit Ayedawbon, it can be inferred that Bala married Hnin U Yaing, the younger sister of Ma Gadu, c. 1282/83. (Note: Their first son Saw O was born c. 1284 per (Pan Hla 2005: 39). Hnin U Yaing was still unmarried in 1281/82 (643 ME) per (Pan Hla 2005: 23).)

Bala and U Yaing became a powerful couple in the following dozen years by being close to Gadu, who went on to carve out a largely independent polity based out of the three Mon-speaking regions of Lower Burma by 1296. (Supported by the Siamese kingdom of Sukhothai, Gadu, styled as Wareru, formally declared independence from Pagan in 1287, and had gained control of Lower Burma by the mid-1290s.) Bala later become governor of Myaungmya, a key port in the Irrawaddy delta, known by the titles of Smim Min Hla and Smim Myaungmya. (Note: He was known as Min Bala per (Phayre 1967: 66). Per (Pan Hla 2005: 37, footnote 1), the Binnya Dala version of the Razadarit says his title was Smim Min Hla; while the Pak Lat version, which the editor Pan Hla uses, gives his title as Smim Myaungmya (Lord of Myaungmya.))

== Overthrow of Hkun Law ==
In January 1307, King Wareru was assassinated by his two grandsons, and his brother Hkun Law succeeded. Law proved to be an ineffective ruler, and never gained the support of his vassals. Bala ruled the Irrawaddy delta like a sovereign. In March 1311, Bala and Hnin U Yaing seized the Martaban throne while Law was on an elephant hunting trip near Moulmein (Mawlamyaing). Law found out about the coup only upon his return from the hunting trip when he found the capital's gates firmly shut. He tried to flee to the nearby woods, but Bala's troops chased him and killed him there.

Bala initially wanted to proclaim himself king. But his wife objected, saying that Bala was too old already, and that their eldest son Saw O, as nephew of Wareru, would stand a better chance at gaining the support of the vassals. During the deliberations, the throne was vacant for at least two weeks, perhaps even longer. (Note: Since Hkun Law was 56 (in his 57th year) at his death, he must have died by 6th waxing of Late Tagu 672 ME (26 March 1311). Per (Pan Hla 2005: 39), Saw O became king on Saturday, 6th waxing of Tagu 673 ME (10 April 1311).) Bala finally yielded to his wife's demand, and Saw O ascended the throne on 10 April 1311.

== Power behind the throne ==
Despite Saw O's accession, Bala remained the actual power behind the throne. The Razadarit Ayedawbon reports that Lord of Myaungmya managed all affairs related to the kingdom, including economic and military affairs. He built himself a "palace" at a nearby hill, replete with a wing to house his concubines, and lived there like a sovereign. (The chronicle says that Bala used to have the concubine wing locked from the outside, and that when a fire broke out one day, several concubines died inside. To commemorate the deaths, he built a Buddhist pagoda nearby.)

He and his chief wife U Yaing both died from old age in the mid-to-late 1310s. (Note: He likely died sometime between 1314 and 1319. (Pan Hla 2005: 38): Bala and U Yaing both died after their two grandchildren Saw E and May Hnin Aw-Kanya were born, and before 682 ME (1320/21). Since Saw E was born in 1313, Aw-Kanya was likely born in 1314 or later.)

== Family ==
Bala and U Yaing had at least three sons, two of whom—Saw O and Saw Zein—became kings of Martaban. Bala had another son Smim E Kan-Kaung by another wife. E Kan-Kaung was the grandfather of Gov. Laukpya of Myaungmya and Gov. Byattaba of Martaban.

== Bibliography ==
- Harvey, G. E. (1925). History of Burma: From the Earliest Times to 10 March 1824. London: Frank Cass & Co. Ltd.
- Pan Hla, Nai (1968). Razadarit Ayedawbon (in Burmese) (8th printing, 2004 ed.). Yangon: Armanthit Sarpay.
- Phayre, Lt. Gen. Sir Arthur P. (1883). History of Burma (1967 ed.). London: Susil Gupta.

Min Bala of Myaungmya Hanthawaddy Dynasty Died: by 1319
Royal titles
Preceded by	Governor of Myaungmya; 1290s–1310s	Succeeded by Smim Za-E
