= Saw Zein =

Saw Zein စောဇိတ်

King of Martaban
- Reign: by 28 September 1323 – c. April 1330
- Predecessor: Saw O
- Successor: Zein Pun
- Born: 19 May 1303; Sunday, 4th waxing of Nayon 665 ME; Martaban Kingdom
- Died: c. April 1330 (aged 26) c. Kason 692 ME; Martaban (Mottama); Martaban Kingdom
- Consort: Sanda Min Hla; May Hnin Htapi
- Issue Detail: Mwei Ne; Maha Dewi; Binnya U Mi Ma-Hsan; Min Linka; Tala Saw Lun
- House: Wareru
- Father: Min Bala
- Mother: Hnin U Yaing
- Religion: Theravada Buddhism

Saw Zein (Burmese: စောဇိတ်, Burmese pronunciation: [sɔ́ zeiʔ]; also known as Saw Zeik and Binnya Ran De; 1303–1330) was king of Martaban from 1323 to 1330. He inherited a newly independent kingdom from his elder brother Saw O but spent much of his reign putting down rebellions. Although he regained the Mon-speaking provinces of Lower Burma, he could not recover the Tenasserim coast from Martaban's former overlord Sukhothai.

Zein was assassinated in 1330 in a coup organized by Zein Pun, one of his senior commanders. Zein Pun seized the throne only to be killed a week later.

== Early life ==
Chronicles provide little information about his early life. Saw Zein was born on 19 May 1303 to Princess Hnin U Yaing and Gov. Min Bala of Myaungmya. He had two other full brothers, and at least one half brother. He was presumably brought up in Myaungmya, a key port in the Irrawaddy delta, where his father was governor. His whereabouts during the reign of his eldest brother King Saw O (r. 1311–1323) is unknown except that Zein was married to his first cousin Princess Sanda Min Hla, and had three children by 1323.

== Reign ==
=== Accession ===
The prince was suddenly thrust into the spotlight in September 1323 when the 39-year-old O died. With O's eldest son, Saw E, still just about 10 years old, the 19-year-old Zein ascended the Martaban throne. At his accession, he made Sanda Min Hla his chief queen but also raised his sister-in-law May Hnin Htapi, who was a Siamese princess, as a principal queen.

=== Reunification campaigns ===
At his accession, Zein inherited a fully independent kingdom. O had broken with his nominal overlord Sukhothai since 1319, and taken Lamphun and the Tenasserim coast by 1321. However, in the tradition of the prevailing Southeast Asian administrative model, every new high king had to establish his authority with the vassals all over again. The 19-year-old king garnered no initial support, and the vassal rulers in the Pegu province and delta promptly revolted.

Zein had to rebuild the kingdom all anew. His first target was the Pegu province (present-day Yangon Region and southern Bago Region). He left the capital Martaban (Mottama) with a strong garrison, and marched north with the army. The inaugural campaign was successful; he took Pegu (Bago), Dagon (modern Central Yangon), Dala (modern Dala-Twante) and Watanaw.

His next target was the Irrawaddy delta province, which remained in revolt. He did not return to Martaban, and instead affixed a temporary capital north of Pegu. He went on elephant hunting trips to gather more war elephants for the next campaign. With the renewed force, Zein then invaded the delta, and got the lords of Myaungmya and Bassein (Pathein) to submit.

His job was far from over. While Zein was campaigning in Lower Burma, his nominal vassals on the Tenasserim coast also revolted. (Note: The Razadarit Ayedawbon (Pan Hla 2005: 39) says the Tenasserim vassals revolted. But (Phayre 1967: 66) says that Siam retook the region. Both events are not mutually exclusive.) Zein sent a force led by Gen. Bon-Yin to retake the coast. The army regained Tavoy but was driven back at Tenasserim (Taninthayi). He sued for a truce with Sukhothai. The king of Sukhothai treated him like a vassal, giving him the title Binnya Ran De (ဗညား ရံဒယ်, Burmese pronunciation: [bəɲá jàɴ dɛ̀]).

=== Later campaigns ===
After the truce with Sukhothai, Zein tried to pick off Prome, then a nominal vassal of the northern Pinya Kingdom. He sent a sizable force led by his half-nephew Saw E Pyathat but the invaders were driven back. Pyathat died in action. The defeat in the north augured renewed hostilities in the south. The truce with Sukhothai had ended by the late 1320s when Martaban again lost control of Tavoy. Zein sent his nephew Saw E to retake Tavoy but the campaign ended badly. Zein blamed the failure on E, and sent his nephew to prison near the frontier with Prome.

== Death ==
Zein was assassinated in a coup by one of his trusted officers Zein Pun c. April/May 1330. (Note: He died sometime between 29 March 1330 and 20 May 1330. (Pan Hla 2005: 41): Zein died at age 26 (27th year) in 692 ME, which began on 29 March 1330. Since he was born on 4th waxing of Nayon 665 ME, Zein must have died by 3rd waxing of Nayon 692 ME (20 May 1330).) The chronicle says that Pun, the commander of a special 500-man battalion, invited the king to a housewarming ceremony of Pun's new residence, and had his men assassinate the unsuspecting king as he entered the house. (Note: According to (Phayre 1967: 66), Zein died in action in 1330 while attacking Prome, then a largely independent polity immediately north of the Pegu province. But the Razadarit (Pan Hla 2005: 40) states that the commander killed in action was Saw E Pyathat, not Saw Zein.) Zein Pun seized the throne. But the usurper was killed a week later in a putsch organized by Zein's chief queen Sanda Min Hla.

== Family ==
According to the Razadarit Ayedawbon chronicle, the king had two principal queens and five children by them. He had at least another daughter, Tala Saw Lun by a concubine. (Note: (Pan Hla 2005: 203–204): Lun's three granddaughters later became queens of King Razadarit.)

Queen	Rank	Issue	Reference
Sanda Min Hla	Chief queen	Mwei Ne (died young); Maha Dewi, Regent of Hanthawaddy (r. 1383–84); Binnya U, King of Hanthwaddy (r. 1348–84)	
May Hnin Htapi	Principal queen	Mi Ma-Hsan, wife of Byattaba of Martaban; Min Linka, Gov. of Pegu (r. 1348–c. 1353)	

== Bibliography ==
- Htin Aung, Maung (1967). A History of Burma. New York and London: Cambridge University Press.
- Pan Hla, Nai (2005) [1968]. Razadarit Ayedawbon (in Burmese) (8th printing ed.). Yangon: Armanthit Sarpay.
- Phayre, Lt. Gen. Sir Arthur P. (1967) [1883]. History of Burma. London: Susil Gupta.

Saw Zein Wareru Dynasty Born: 19 May 1303 Died: c. April 1330
Regnal titles
Preceded by Saw O	King of Martaban by 28 September 1323 – c. April 1330	Succeeded by Zein Pun
