= Heir presumptive =

Monarchical title of inheritance

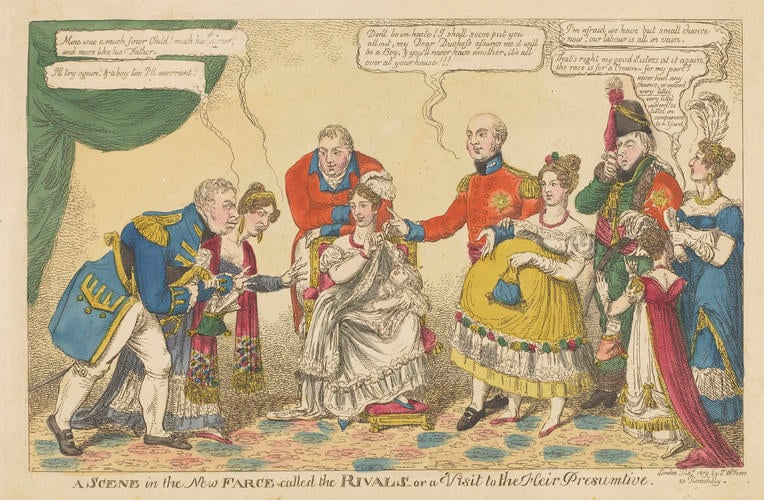
Satirical cartoon of 1819 mocking the efforts of various members of the British royal family to produce an heir presumptive; at the time, King George III was dying and the heir apparent, later George IV, had no surviving legitimate children. The throne would pass to the heir presumptive, his younger brother William IV, in 1830; William had no surviving legitimate children either when he died in 1837, so Victoria, daughter of their brother Edward, became Queen. (In the cartoon, the woman in yellow is Princess Victoria of Saxe-Coburg-Saalfeld, depicted as heavily pregnant with the future Queen Victoria.)

An heir presumptive is the person entitled to inherit a throne, peerage, or other hereditary honour, but whose position can be displaced by a subsequent birth or recognition of a person with a better claim to the position in question. This is in contrast to an heir apparent, whose claim on the position cannot be displaced in this manner.

== Overview ==
Depending on the laws controlling succession to the monarchy (or the rules of the peerage) in question, the heir presumptive might be:

- the daughter of a monarch if males take preference over females and the monarch (as yet) has no son; or
- the senior member of a collateral line if the monarch is childless or if the monarch's direct descendants cannot inherit, either because:
  - they are daughters, and females are completely barred from inheriting;
  - the monarch's children are illegitimate;
  - or some other legal disqualification exists, such as
    - the descendant is descended from the monarch through a morganatic line, or
    - the descendant refuses to or cannot adopt the religion that, to be monarch, the person is required to profess.

The subsequent birth of a legitimate child to the monarch may displace the heir presumptive by creating an heir apparent, or a more eligible heir presumptive. It is not assumed that the monarch and his or her consort are incapable of producing further children despite advanced age or infirmity. For example, on the day before Queen Elizabeth II ascended the British throne, her father George VI was gravely ill and her mother was 51 years old, but Elizabeth was still the heir presumptive rather than heir apparent because of the remote possibility of her parents producing a son.

An heir presumptive's position may not be secure even after they ascend their throne, as a posthumous child, born after the death of his or her parent the late monarch, could have a superseding claim. Following the death of the childless King William IV of the United Kingdom in 1837, he was succeeded by his niece Victoria. Per the Regency Act 1830, however, Victoria's accession would be permanent only once it could be determined that William's widow Adelaide was not pregnant with a posthumous child. The possibility of such an event was even mentioned in Victoria's accession proclamation, even though Adelaide was 44 years old and had last been pregnant 17 years earlier, while William had been in failing health for months. Had a child been born, he or she would have replaced Victoria on the throne. Such a situation occurred in Spain in 1885, when King Alfonso XII died and left behind his widow who was three months pregnant. His five-year-old daughter and heir presumptive, María de las Mercedes, was not declared queen because she would be displaced if a son was born; instead, there was a six-month interregnum until the birth of her brother Alfonso XIII, who assumed the throne as king immediately upon birth. Had the pregnancy been lost or resulted in another daughter, Mercedes would have become queen regnant and been retroactively recognized as having become queen upon the death of her father (which would have obviated the need for an interregnum, though only in hindsight).

Heir presumptive, like heir apparent, is not a title or position. Rather, it is a general term for a person who holds a certain place in the order of succession. In some monarchies, the heir apparent bears, ipso facto, a specific title and rank (e.g., in Denmark, the Netherlands, the United Kingdom where Prince of Wales is used to denote the heir apparent). This also is sometimes the case for noble titleholders (e.g., in Spain and the United Kingdom), but a mere heir presumptive does not bear—or is not traditionally given—that title. In other monarchies (e.g., in Monaco, Spain) the first in line to the throne always bears a specific title (i.e., "Hereditary Prince/Princess of Monaco", or Spain's "Prince/Princess of Asturias") by right, regardless of whether she or he is heir apparent or heir presumptive.

== Simultaneous heirs presumptive ==
In Scots law and in the English and Welsh common law of inheritance, there is no seniority between sisters; where there is no son to inherit, any number of daughters share equally. Therefore, certain hereditary titles can have multiple simultaneous heirs presumptive. These are called, in Scotland for example, heirs portioner presumptive. Since most titles cannot be held by two persons simultaneously, two daughters (without a brother) who are to inherit in this way would do so as co-parceners; before they inherit, both are heirs presumptive. In these circumstances, the title would in fact be held in abeyance until one person represents the claim of both, or the claim is renounced by one or the other for herself and her heirs, or the abeyance is ended by the Crown. There are special procedures for handling doubtful or disputed cases.

== Past heirs presumptive who did not inherit thrones ==
The list is limited to heirs presumptive who did not succeed due to death (heirs predeceasing their monarch), abolitions of monarchies, or changes in succession laws. Heirs presumptive displaced by the birth of an heir with a better claim are not included due to how common such occurrences were.

- Marcus Claudius Marcellus was heir presumptive to his uncle and father-in-law Augustus until the former's death in 23 BC.
- Marcus Vipsanius Agrippa was heir presumptive to his father-in-law Augustus until his death in 12 BC.
- Marcus Aemilius Lepidus was heir presumptive to his brother-in-law Caligula until his death in 38 AD.
- Britannicus was heir presumptive to his stepbrother Nero until his death in 55 AD.
- Marwan ibn Abd al-Malik was heir presumptive to his brother Al-Walid I until his death circa 715 AD.
- Prince Sawara was heir presumptive to his brother Emperor Kanmu until his death in 785 AD.
- Robert Curthose was heir presumptive to his brother William II of England until he was disinherited for rebellion in 1088.
- Edmund of Scotland was heir presumptive to his uncle Donald III of Scotland until his uncle's overthrow in 1097.
- Empress Matilda was heir presumptive to her father Henry I of England but upon Henry's death in 1135, Matilda's cousin Stephen, King of England took the throne instead.
- Arthur I, Duke of Brittany, was heir presumptive to his uncle Richard I of England but upon Richard's death in 1199, Arthur's uncle John, King of England took the throne instead.
- Peter I, Count of Urgell, was heir presumptive to his nephew Afonso III of Portugal until his death in 1258.
- Margaret of Scotland, Queen of Norway, was heir presumptive to her father Alexander III of Scotland until her death in 1283.
- Uzana of Bassein was heir presumptive to his father Narathihapate until he was assassinated in 1287.
- Edward Bruce was heir presumptive to his brother Robert I of Scotland until he claimed the throne of Ireland.
- Marjorie Bruce was heir presumptive to her father Robert I of Scotland until her death in 1316.
- Charles, Count of Valois, was heir presumptive to his nephew Charles IV of France twice until his death in 1325.
- Binnya E Laung was heir presumptive to his father Binnya E Law until his death.
- Maria of Calabria was heir presumptive to her sister Joanna I of Naples until her death in 1366.
- Beatrice of Portugal was heir presumptive to her father Ferdinand I of Portugal but upon Ferdinand's death in 1383, Beatrice's half-uncle John I of Portugal took the throne instead.
- Bawlawkyantaw was heir presumptive to his father Razadarit until his execution in 1390.
- Theiddat was heir presumptive to his brother Minkhaung I until his nephew Minye Kyawswa was made heir instead.
- Joan of Navarre was heir presumptive to her father Charles III of Navarre until her death in 1413.
- Robert Stewart, Duke of Albany, was heir presumptive to his nephew James I of Scotland until his death in 1420.
- Thomas of Lancaster, 1st Duke of Clarence, was heir presumptive to his brother Henry V of England from his brother's succession in 1413 to his death in 1421.
- Catherine, Princess of Asturias, was heir presumptive to her father John II of Castile until her death in 1424.
- Murdoch Stewart, Duke of Albany, was heir presumptive to his cousin James I of Scotland until he was attained and executed in 1425.
- John of Lancaster, 1st Duke of Bedford, was heir presumptive to his nephew Henry VI of England until his death in 1435.
- Walter Stewart, Earl of Atholl, was heir presumptive to his grandnephew James II of Scotland until he was executed in 1437 for his part in killing the previous king James I.
- Margaret Stewart, Dauphine of France, was heir presumptive to her brother James II of Scotland until her death in 1445.
- Humphrey, Duke of Gloucester, was heir presumptive to his nephew Henry VI of England until his death in 1447.
- Joanna la Beltraneja was heir presumptive to her father Henry IV of Castile until he named his brother Alfonso as heir instead.
- Alfonso, Prince of Asturias, was heir presumptive to his half-brother Henry IV of Castile until his death in 1468.
- George Plantagenet, 1st Duke of Clarence, was heir presumptive to his brother Edward IV of England until he fled after rebelling against him in 1470.
- Isabella of Aragon, Queen of Portugal, was heir presumptive to her parents Isabella I of Castile and Ferdinand II of Aragon until her death in 1498.
- Miguel da Paz, Prince of Portugal, in addition to being heir apparent to his father Manuel I of Portugal, was heir presumptive to his maternal grandparents Isabella I of Castile and Ferdinand II of Aragon until his death in 1500.
- James Stewart, Duke of Ross, was heir presumptive to his brother James IV of Scotland until his death in 1504.
- Alexander Stewart, Duke of Ross, was heir presumptive to his brother James V of Scotland until his death in 1515.
- John Stewart, Duke of Albany, was heir presumptive to his cousin James V of Scotland until his death in 1536.
- Carlos, Prince of Asturias, in addition to being heir apparent to his father Philip II of Spain, was also heir presumptive to his cousin Sebastian of Portugal until his death in 1568.
- James Hamilton, 2nd Earl of Arran, was heir presumptive to James VI of Scotland until his death in 1575.
- Ranuccio I Farnese, Duke of Parma, was heir presumptive to his granduncle Henry, King of Portugal until the succession crisis that emerged after Henry's death in 1580.
- Francis, Duke of Anjou, was heir presumptive to his brother Henry III of France until his death in 1584.
- Charles de Bourbon was heir presumptive to his nephew Henry IV of France until his death in 1590.
- Dmitry of Uglich was heir presumptive to his half-brother Feodor I of Russia until his death in 1591.
- Dmitry Shuisky was heir presumptive to his brother Vasili IV of Russia until his brother was overthrown in 1610.
- Sigismund III Vasa was heir presumptive of Russia to his son Vladislav until his son's overthrow in 1613.
- Charles Philip, Duke of Södermanland, was heir presumptive to his brother Gustavus Adolphus of Sweden until his death in 1622.
- Catherine of Sweden, Countess Palatine of Kleeburg, was heir presumptive to her niece Christina, Queen of Sweden, until her death in 1638.
- Margaret Theresa of Spain was heir presumptive to her brother Charles II of Spain until her death in 1673.
- Maria Antonia of Austria was heir presumptive to her uncle Charles II until her death in 1692.
- Joseph Ferdinand, Electoral Prince of Bavaria, in addition to being heir apparent to his father Maximilian II Emanuel, Elector of Bavaria, was heir presumptive to his granduncle Charles II until his death in 1699.
- Sophia, Electress of Hanover, was declared heir presumptive to the English, Scottish, and Irish thrones by the Act of Settlement 1701, but died before acceding to the throne of her distant cousin, Queen Anne. Sophia's son George I became King instead.
- Philippe II, Duke of Orléans, was heir presumptive to his cousin Louis XV of France until his death in 1723.
- Duke Charles Louis Frederick of Mecklenburg was heir presumptive to his half-brother Adolphus Frederick III, Duke of Mecklenburg-Strelitz, until his death a few months before his brother in 1752.
- Prince Augustus William of Prussia was heir presumptive to his brother Frederick II of Prussia until his death in 1758.
- Frederick Michael, Count Palatine of Zweibrücken was heir presumptive to his brother Christian IV, Count Palatine of Zweibrücken until his death in 1767.
- Duke Louis of Mecklenburg-Schwerin was heir presumptive to his brother Frederick II, Duke of Mecklenburg-Schwerin, until his death in 1778.
- Prince Joseph of Saxe-Hildburghausen was heir presumptive to his great-grandnephew Frederick, Duke of Saxe-Hildburghausen until his death in 1787.
- Ferdinand Karl, Archduke of Austria-Este was heir presumptive to his father-in-law Ercole III d'Este, Duke of Modena until Ercole was deposed by Napoleonic forces in 1796.
- Inthraphithak was heir presumptive to his father Taksin until Taksin was overthrown and both were executed in 1802.
- Prince Louis of Anhalt-Köthen was heir presumptive to his brother Augustus Christian Frederick, Duke of Anhalt-Köthen until his death in 1802.
- Maha Sura Singhanat was heir presumptive to his brother Phutthayotfa Chulalok until his death in 1803.
- Anurak Devesh was heir presumptive to his uncle Phutthayotfa Chulalok until his death in 1806.
- Franz Joseph, Prince of Hohenlohe-Schillingsfürst was heir presumptive to his brother Charles Albert III, Prince of Hohenlohe-Waldenburg-Schillingsfürst until their territory was mediatised in 1806.
- Maha Senanurak was heir presumptive to his brother Phutthaloetla Naphalai until his death in 1817.
- Grand Duke Konstantin Pavlovich of Russia was heir presumptive to his brother Alexander I of Russia until he renounced his rights in 1823.
- Prince Frederick, Duke of York and Albany, brother of King George IV of the United Kingdom and Hanover, was heir presumptive from his brother's accession in 1820 to his (Frederick's) own death in 1827.
- Maximilian, Hereditary Prince of Saxony, was heir presumptive to his brother Anthony of Saxony until he renounced his rights in favour of his son Frederick Augustus in 1830.
- Infante Carlos of Spain, Count of Molina, brother of King Ferdinand VII of Spain. Ferdinand VII changed the succession law in favour of his daughter, who became Isabella II after the King's death in September 1833. This led to the Carlist Wars in Spain.
- Sakdiphonlasep was heir presumptive to his nephew Nangklao until his death in 1832.
- Maria II of Portugal was heir presumptive to her younger brother Pedro II of Brazil until 1835, when she was formally excluded from the Brazilian line of succession following her definitive accession to the Portuguese throne.
- Louis, Prince of Anhalt-Pless was heir presumptive to his brother Henry, Duke of Anhalt-Köthen until his death in 1841.
- Archduke Franz Karl of Austria, brother of Emperor Ferdinand I of Austria, was heir presumptive throughout his brother's reign until the revolution that saw his brother forced to abdicate also saw Franz renounce his rights in favour of his son Franz Joseph in 1848.
- Ahmad Rifaat Pasha was heir presumptive to his half-uncle Sa'id of Egypt until his death in 1858.
- Prince Henry, Count of Bardi, was heir presumptive to his brother Robert I, Duke of Parma, until the monarchy was abolished in 1859.
- Archduke Karl Salvator of Austria was heir presumptive to his brother Ferdinand IV, Grand Duke of Tuscany, until the monarchy was abolished in 1860.
- Prince Louis, Count of Trani, was heir presumptive to his half-brother Francis II of the Two Sicilies until the monarchy was abolished in 1861.
- Prince Albert of Saxe-Coburg and Gotha was heir presumptive to his brother Ernest II, Duke of Saxe-Coburg and Gotha, until his death in 1861.
- Infante João, Duke of Beja, was heir presumptive to his brother Luís I of Portugal until his death in 1861.
- Ferdinand, Hereditary Prince of Denmark, was heir presumptive to his nephew King Frederick VII of Denmark until his death five months before his nephew in 1863.
- Albert Edward, Prince of Wales, in addition to being heir apparent to his mother Queen Victoria, was also heir presumptive to his uncle Ernest II, Duke of Saxe-Coburg and Gotha, until renouncing his rights in favour of his younger brothers in 1863.
- Pinklao was heir presumptive to his brother Mongkut until his death in 1866.
- Prince William of Hesse-Kassel was heir presumptive to his cousin Frederick William, Elector of Hesse, until the monarchy was abolished in 1866.
- Prince William of Hesse-Philippsthal-Barchfeld was heir presumptive to his brother Alexis, Landgrave of Hesse-Philippsthal-Barchfeld, until the monarchy was abolished in 1866.
- Prince Frederick of Württemberg was heir presumptive to his cousin and brother-in-law Charles I of Württemberg until his death in 1870.
- Prince Charles of Hesse and by Rhine was heir presumptive to his brother Louis III, Grand Duke of Hesse, until his death a few months before his brother in 1877.
- Leopold, Prince of Hohenzollern, was heir presumptive to his brother Carol I of Romania until he renounced his rights in favour of his sons in 1880.
- Wichaichan was heir presumptive to his cousin Chulalongkorn until his death in 1885.
- William, Prince of Hohenzollern, was heir presumptive to his uncle Carol I of Romania until he renounced his rights in favour of his younger brother Ferdinand in 1886.
- Isabel, Princess Imperial of Brazil, was the heir presumptive to her father Pedro II of Brazil on the throne of the Empire of Brazil until the monarchy was abolished in 1889.
- Archduke Karl Ludwig of Austria was the heir presumptive of his brother Franz Joseph I of Austria from the suicide of his nephew Rudolf, Crown Prince of Austria, until his death in 1896.
- Duke William of Württemberg was heir presumptive to his cousin William II of Württemberg until his death in 1896.
- Princess Sophie of the Netherlands was heir presumptive to her niece Queen Wilhelmina of the Netherlands until her death in 1897.
- Grand Duke George Alexandrovich of Russia was heir presumptive to his brother Nicholas II of Russia until his death in 1899.
- Duke Nicholas of Württemberg was heir presumptive to his cousin William II of Württemberg until his death in 1903.
- Mercedes, Princess of Asturias, daughter of Alfonso XII of Spain, was the heir presumptive at her birth. After her father died, her posthumously born brother Alfonso became king as Alfonso XIII and she remained the heir presumptive until her death in 1904.
- Ernest, Count of Lippe-Biesterfeld was heir presumptive to his cousin Alexander, Prince of Lippe until his death in 1904.
- Prince Philippe, Count of Flanders, was the heir presumptive of his older brother King Leopold II of Belgium after the death of his nephew Prince Leopold, Duke of Brabant, until his own death in 1905.
- Prince Arthur, Duke of Connaught and Strathearn, was heir presumptive to his brother Alfred, Duke of Saxe-Coburg and Gotha, until he renounced his rights and that of his son Prince Arthur of Connaught in favour of his nephew Charles Edward.
- Prince Moritz of Saxe-Altenburg was heir presumptive to his brother Ernst I, Duke of Saxe-Altenburg, until his death in 1907.
- Afonso, Prince Royal of Portugal, was the heir presumptive of his nephew Manuel II of Portugal until the monarchy was abolished in 1910.
- Pujie was heir presumptive to his brother Puyi until the Xinhai Revolution in 1911, and Republic of China founded in 1912. He became heir presumptive again after the puppet regime Manchukuo after the Mukden Incident, while Puyi became the emperor of Manchukuo as well until the surrender of Japan in 1945.
- Luitpold, Prince Regent of Bavaria, was heir presumptive to his nephew Otto, King of Bavaria until his death in 1912.
- Archduke Franz Ferdinand of Austria was the heir presumptive of his uncle Emperor Franz Joseph I of Austria until his assassination June 28, 1914, in Sarajevo.
- Duke Philipp of Württemberg was heir presumptive to his cousin William II of Württemberg until his death in 1917.
- Prince Maximilian of Baden was heir presumptive to his cousin Frederick II, Grand Duke of Baden, until the monarchy was abolished in 1918.
- Charles Michael, Duke of Mecklenburg, was heir presumptive to his cousin Adolphus Frederick VI, Grand Duke of Mecklenburg-Strelitz, until the throne became vacant and was later abolished in 1918.
- Ernst, Prince of Saxe-Meiningen, was heir presumptive to his half-brother Bernhard III, Duke of Saxe-Meiningen, until the monarchy was abolished in 1918.
- Albrecht, Duke of Württemberg, was heir presumptive to his cousin William II of Württemberg until the monarchy was abolished in 1918.
- Prince Moritz Georg of Schaumburg-Lippe was heir presumptive to his brother Adolf II, Prince of Schaumburg-Lippe, until the monarchy was abolished in 1918.
- Sizzo, Prince of Schwarzburg, was heir presumptive to his cousin Günther Victor, Prince of Schwarzburg, until the monarchy was abolished in 1918.
- Heinrich XXVII, Prince Reuss Younger Line, in addition to ruling his own principality, was heir presumptive to his cousin Heinrich XXIV, Prince Reuss of Greiz, until both monarchies were abolished in 1918.
- Prince Eugen of Anhalt was heir presumptive to his brother Joachim Ernst, Duke of Anhalt, until the monarchy was abolished in 1918.
- Chakrabongse Bhuvanath was heir presumptive to his brother Vajiravudh until his death in 1920.
- Asdang Dejavudh was heir presumptive to his brother Vajiravudh until his death in 1924.
- Varananda Dhavaj was heir presumptive to his uncle Vajiravudh until being replaced as heir by his other uncle Prajadhipok in 1924.
- Mahidol Adulyadej was heir presumptive to his half-brother Prajadhipok until his death in 1929.
- Princess Charlotte, Duchess of Valentinois, was heir presumptive to her father Louis II, Prince of Monaco, until renouncing her rights in favour of her son Rainier in 1944.
- Kiril, Prince of Preslav was heir presumptive to his nephew Simeon II of Bulgaria, until his execution by Communists in 1945.
- Prince Nicholas of Romania was heir presumptive to his nephew Michael I of Romania until the monarchy was abolished in 1947.
- Princess Elizabeth, Duchess of Edinburgh was heir presumptive to her father George VI in India until it became a republic in 1950, as well as Newfoundland until it joined Canada in 1949 (she reigned as Queen of Canada from 6 February 1952 until her death on 8 September 2022).
- Prince Knud of Denmark was the heir presumptive of his brother King Frederik IX of Denmark, but an amendment to the Danish Constitution in 1953 replaced the previously semi-Salic succession with male-preference primogeniture and proclaimed King Frederick's eldest daughter Princess Margrethe, later Queen Margrethe II of Denmark, heir presumptive.
- Mohammed Ali Tewfik was heir presumptive to Fuad II of Egypt until the monarchy was abolished in 1953.
- 'Abd al-Ilah was heir presumptive to his nephew Faisal II of Iraq until they were both executed in 1958.
- Tunku Abdul Malik was heir presumptive to his brother Abdul Halim of Kedah until his death in 2015.
