= Tanintharyi Township =

Taninthayi Township တနင်္သာရီမြို့နယ်
- Township
- Location in Myeik district

- Location in Myanmar
- Coordinates: 14°05′N 98°12′E
- Country: Myanmar
- Region: Taninthayi Region
- District: Myeik District
- Capital: Taninthayi

Area
  - Total: 11,363 km^{2} (4,387 sq mi)

Population (2014)
  - Total: 106,853
  - Density: 9.4036/km^{2} (24.355/sq mi)
- Time zone: UTC+6.30 (MST)

Taninthayi Township (Burmese: (တနင်္သာရီ)တနင်္သာရီမြို့နယ်) is a township of Myeik District in the Tanintharyi Region of Myanmar. The principal town is Taninthayi.

== Demographics ==
=== 2014 ===
Historical Population
Year	Pop.	±%
2014	106,853	—

The 2014 Myanmar census reported that Myeik Township had a population of 106,853. The population density was 9.4 people per km^{2}. The census reported that the median age was 21.9 years, and 105 males per 100 females. There were 54,349 households; the mean household size was 5.2.
