= Mottama =

Mottama: မုတ္တမ မုဟ်တၟအ်
- Town
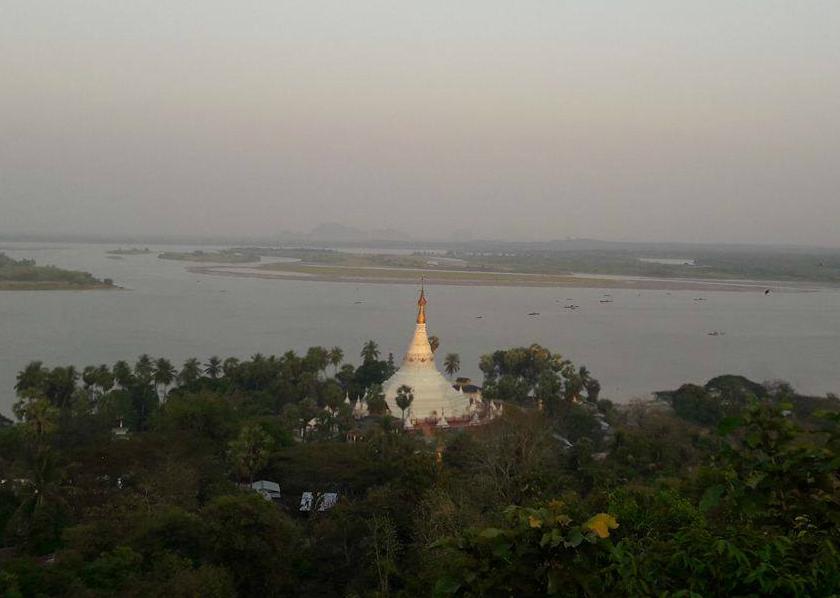

- Location in Burma
- Coordinates: 16°31′48″N 97°36′08″E
- Country: Myanmar
- State: Mon State
- District: Thaton District

Population
  - Ethnicities: Mon Burman Karen
  - Religions: Theravada Buddhism
- Time zone: UTC+6:30 (MST)

Mottama (Burmese: မုတ္တမမြို့, pronounced [moʊʔtəma̰ mjo̰]; Muttama Mon: မုဟ်တၟံ, [mùh mɔˀ]; formerly Martaban) is a town in the Thaton District of Mon State, Myanmar. Located on the west bank of the Thanlwin River (Salween), on the opposite side of Mawlamyaing, Mottama was the capital of the Martaban Kingdom (later known as Hanthawaddy Kingdom) from 1287 to 1364, and an entrepôt of international repute until the mid-16th century.

== Etymology ==
"Mottama" derives from the Mon language term "Mumaw" (Mon: မုဟ်တၟံ; /mùh mɔˀ/), which means "rocky spur."

== History ==
=== Prior to 15th century ===
The Silk Road in the 1st century

From the 2nd century BCE to the 15th century CE, Martaban was an important trading port. The historic Maritime Silk Road connected the East and West, and Martaban storage jars were imported through this trade route.

The earliest evidence of the existence of Martaban in Myanmar history was revealed in an inscription erected by King Sithu II of the Bagan Empire in 1176.

The ancient city was called Sampanago (Campа̄nа̄ga, lit. City of Serpents) or Puñjaluin in the Mon language. It may also be referred to within the context of Muttama-Dhañyawaddy or Sampanago-Lakunbyin as a roughly 45 kilometer stretch or settlements along the Salween River stretching from modern day Mottama to Hpa-an. Artifacts from the Sampanago site support a thriving sixth to ninth century culture with trade to other early sites over land and across the sea. Coins and cultural influences in artifacts indicate that Sampanago had close contacts with Thaton and early sites in U Thong and Kanchanaburi

In the 13th century, Martaban was a southern provincial capital in the Bagan Empire. After Bagan's collapse in 1287, King Wareru founded the Martaban Kingdom based out of Martaban. The city was the capital of a Mon-speaking kingdom from 1287 to 1364. Nominally it was a vassal state of the Thai Sukhothai Kingdom until 1314. From 1369 onwards, the Hanthawaddy kings ruled the kingdom from Bago (Pegu). From 1364 to 1388, Martaban was under the de facto independent rule of Byattaba. In 1388, King Razadarit reconquered the city. Though it was no longer the capital, the city remained an important trading port from the 14th century to the early 16th century.

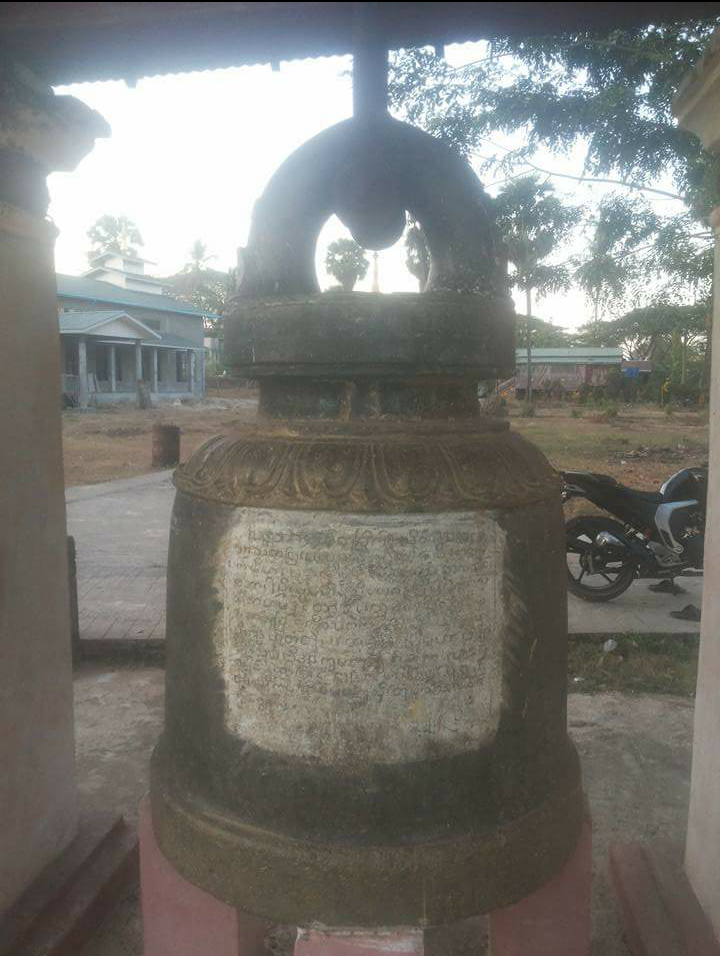
Old Martaban bell (AD 1492) with Mon language inscription on it

The old name of the city, Martaban, came to mean 'jar' in several varieties of Arabic, and internationally for the large ceramic jars that were characteristic of the city's exports. In Egyptian Arabic, by metathesis, the word has changed to become batraman, and refers to any glass or ceramic jar.

=== 16th to 19th centuries ===
In 1541, King Tabinshwehti of Taungoo captured the fortified city, and utterly destroyed it, forever relegating it back to a backwater. From the 16th to the 19th centuries, Martaban was a strategic spot in a series of wars fought between Burma and Siam.

=== Colonial Period ===
Martaban was captured by the British in the First Anglo-Burmese War of 1824–1826, but returned to Burmese administration after the war. It became the border town however as the entire Tenasserim coast from Mawlamyaing down became British territory. The town became part of British Lower Burma after the Second Anglo-Burmese War of 1852.

Rudyard Kipling refers to Martaban in his poem "In the Neolithic Age": "And the crimes of Clapham chaste in Martaban," suggesting he perceived it to be a place where immoral behavior was tolerated.

== Geography ==
The Salween River flows through the town into the Bay of Martaban. The town's location is adjacent to the confluence of five rivers – the Salween, the Ataran, the Gyaing, the Dontami, and the Hlaingbwe – as they empty into the Gulf of Martaban. The town is also surrounded by hills that continue located in the Salween valley where various crops are cultivated.

== Transport ==
Mottama was the terminus of the road and the railroad from Yangon, where the Thanlwin empties into the Gulf of Martaban in the Andaman Sea. Today Mawlamyaing Bridge has laid down a link from Mottama to Mawlamyaing and another city in the south Ye.

== Notes ==
Mottama
Preceded by Bagan as Capital of Bagan Empire	Capital of Martaban Kingdom; 30 January 1287 – c. February 1364	Succeeded by Donwun
