= Razadarit Ayedawbon =

Burmese chronicle

- Author: Royal Historians of Hanthawaddy Kingdom
- Original title: ရာဇာဓိရာဇ် အရေးတော်ပုံ
- Translator: Binnya Dala
- Language: Burmese
- Series: Mon chronicles
- Genre: Chronicle, History
- Publication date: 1560s
- Publication place: Kingdom of Burma

Rachathirat, a Thai version of Razadarit Ayedawbon which was translated from Mon manuscripts in late 18th century. This depicted edition was printed as a Souvernir book for the cremation ceremony of Prince Boworadet in 1954.

Razadarit Ayedawbon or Raaza-drit Ayey-dor-bome(/ˌrɑːzədəˈrɪt əˈjeɪ.dɔːboʊm/ RAH-zə-də-RIT ə-YAY-daw-boh-m ; Mon: အကြီုရာဇာဓိရာဇ်, Burmese: ရာဇာဓိရာဇ် အရေးတော်ပုံ, lit. The Acts of Rājādhirāja) is a Burmese chronicle covering the history of Ramanya from 1287 to 1421. The chronicle consists of accounts of court intrigues, rebellions, diplomatic missions, wars etc. About half of the chronicle is devoted to the reign of King Razadarit (r. 1384–1421), detailing the great king's struggles in the Forty Years' War against King Minkhaung I and Crown Prince Minye Kyawswa of Ava. It has been compared to the likes of the Romance of the Three Kingdoms and is very popular in contemporary Burma, since it features many factions, heroes and warriors from major ethnic groups along with themes of unwavering loyalty, honor, and courage.

It is the Burmese translation of the first half of the Hanthawaddy Chronicle from Mon by Binnya Dala, an ethnic Mon minister and general of Toungoo Dynasty. It is likely the earliest extant text regarding the history of the Mon people in Lower Burma, probably the only surviving portion of the original Mon language chronicle, which was destroyed in 1565 when a rebellion burned down Pegu (Bago).

Four oldest palm-leaf manuscript copies, conjecturally dated to the mid 18th century, of the original Binnya Dala translation have survived. In all, nine slightly different versions of the chronicle existed according to a 1968 analysis by Nai Pan Hla. Pan Hla re-translated one of the versions back to Mon in 1958. He also wrote a new (tenth) version in 1968, synthesizing the Burmese versions of Razadarit, the version of Pak Lat Chronicles, and the accounts in Hmannan as well as modern research.

== Bibliography ==
- Aung-Thwin, Michael A. (2005). The Mists of Rāmañña: The Legend that was Lower Burma (illustrated ed.). Honolulu: University of Hawai'i Press. ISBN 9780824828868.
- Harvey, G.E. (1925). History of Burma: From the Earliest Times to 10 March 1824. London: Frank Cass & Co. Ltd.
- Pan Hla, Nai (2005) [1968]. Razadarit Ayedawbon (in Burmese) (8th printing ed.). Yangon: Armanthit Sarpay.
- Thaw Kaung, U (2010). Aspects of Myanmar History and Culture. Yangon: Gangaw Myaing.
