= Nai Pan Hla =

Burmese anthropologist and researcher (1923–2010)

- နိုင်ပန်းလှ
- Born: 1923; Kawkareik Township, British Burma
- Died: 18 June 2010 (aged 86–87); Yangon, Myanmar
- Occupations: Anthropologist; historian; researcher

Academic background
- Education: Pacific Western University

Academic work
- Discipline: Southeast Asian history
- Institutions: Meio University

Nai Pan Hla (Burmese: နိုင်ပန်းလှ, Mon: နာဲပါန်လှ; 1923 – 18 June 2010) was a Burmese historian and cultural anthropologist of Mon descent. Throughout his career, he published many works on Mon ethnography, including the best-seller The Struggle of Rajadhiraj.

== Early life and education ==
Pan Hla was born in March 1923 in Kawkareik Township, British Burma to Nai Jawt and Mi Cho. He earned bachelors, law, and doctorate degrees from Pacific Western University in Los Angeles.

== Career ==
In 1953, he joined the Ministry of Culture's archaeological department, serving as an official of Mon literature and culture. He published the best-seller Struggle of Rajadhiraj, about Razadarit, in 1977.

In 1992, he published Eleven Mon Dhammasattha Texts. In 1994, he became a professor at Meio University in Okinawa, Japan, where he taught Southeast Asian literature and history, and returned to Myanmar in 1998. He published A Short Mon History in 2013.

== Death ==
He died on 18 June 2010 in Yangon after suffering a paralytic stroke.

== Publications ==
- A Short Mon History (2013)
- Struggle of Rajadhiraj (1977)
