= Hanthawaddy kingdom =

Polity in lower Myanmar (1287–1552)

Coordinates: 17°19′31″N 96°28′08″E

Hanthawaddy kingdom Hongsawatoi kingdom ဍုင်ဟံသာဝတဳ (Mon) ဟံသာဝတီ နေပြည်တော် (Burmese)
- 1287–1552
- Flag

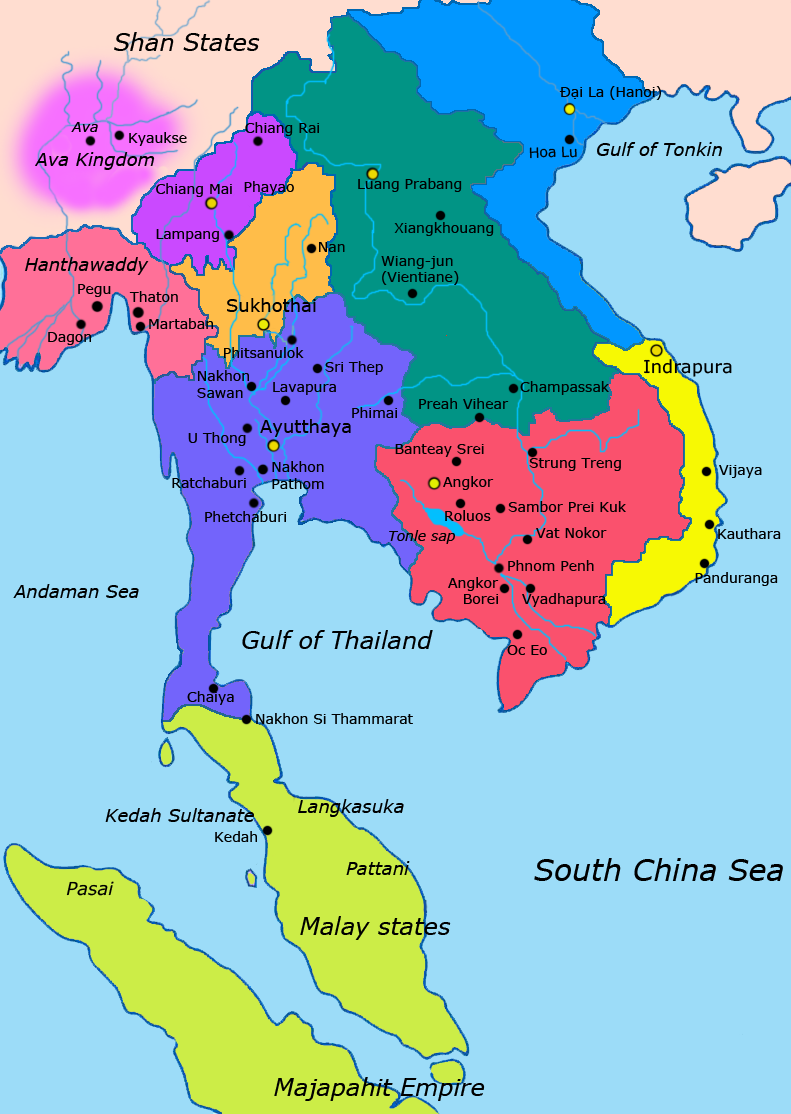
- Hanthawaddy in red in the northwest, c. 1450
- Status: Kingdom
- Capital: Martaban (1287–1364); Donwun (1364–1369); Pegu (1369–1538, 1550–1552)
- Common languages: Mon; Old Burmese
- Religion: Theravada Buddhism
- Government: Monarchy
  - 1287–1307: Wareru
  - 1384–1421: Razadarit
  - 1454–1471: Shin Sawbu
  - 1471–1492: Dhammazedi
  - 1492–1526: Binnya Ran II
- Historical era: Warring states
  - Overthrow of Pagan governor: c. January 1285
  - Independence from Pagan: 30 January 1287
  - Vassal of Sukhothai: 1287–1298, 1307–1317, 1330
  - Forty Years' War: 1385–1424
  - Golden Age: 1426–1534
  - War with Toungoo: 1534–1541
  - 2nd Fall of Pegu: 12 March 1552
Preceded by	Succeeded by
Pagan kingdom	Toungoo dynasty
- Today part of: Myanmar; Thailand

The Hanthawaddy Kingdom (Mon: ဍုၚ် ဟံသာဝတဳ, [hɔŋsawətɔe]; Burmese: ဟံသာဝတီ နေပြည်တော်; also Hongsawatoi or simply Pegu), classical name Ham̥sāvatī ("Realm of Hamsa"), was the major polity that ruled lower Burma (Myanmar) from 1287 to 1539 and briefly from 1550 to 1552, before serving as the imperial capital of the Burmese Toungoo dynasty.

Originally founded as a Mon-speaking kingdom named Ramaññadesa (Mon: ရးမည, Burmese: ရာမည ဒေသ) by King Wareru following the collapse of the Pagan Kingdom in 1287 as a nominal vassal state of the Sukhothai Kingdom and the Mongol Yuan dynasty, it became formally independent in 1330. In its early phase under the Mon Wareru dynasty, the kingdom functioned as a loose federation of three major regional power centres: the Irrawaddy Delta, Bago, and Mottama.In 1539, the kingdom was conquered by King Tabinshwehti of the Burmese Toungoo dynasty, who relocated his imperial capital to Pegu (Hanthawaddy). Following brief Mon rebellions after Tabinshwehti's death, King Bayinnaung re-established Hanthawaddy as the central royal seat of the First Toungoo Empire, bringing both Burmese and Mon elites into his administration.

== History ==
The energetic reign of King Razadarit (r. 1384–1421) cemented the kingdom's existence. Razadarit firmly unified the three Mon-speaking regions—Myaungmya, Donwun, and Martaban—and successfully fended off the northern Burmese-speaking Ava kingdom in the Forty Years' War (1385–1424), making the western kingdom of Rakhine a tributary from 1413 to 1421 in the process. The war ended in a stalemate but was a victory for Hanthawaddy as Ava finally gave up its dream of restoring the Pagan Empire. In the years following the war, Pegu occasionally aided Ava's southern vassal states of Prome and Taungoo in their rebellions but carefully avoided getting plunged into a full-scale war.

After the war, Hanthawaddy entered its golden age, whereas its rival Ava gradually declined. From the 1420s to the 1530s, Hanthawaddy was the most powerful and prosperous of all the post-Pagan kingdoms. Under a string of especially gifted monarchs – Binnya Ran I, Shin Sawbu, Dhammazedi and Binnya Ran II – it enjoyed a long golden age, profiting from foreign commerce. Its merchants traded with traders from across the Indian Ocean, filling the king's treasury with gold and silver, silk, and spices. The kingdom also became a famous centre of Theravada Buddhism. It established strong ties with Sri Lanka and encouraged reforms that spread throughout the country.

The powerful kingdom's end came abruptly. Since the late 15th century, Ava had tried to win the support of the Taungoo dynasty by entering into marriage alliances with King Mingyi Nyo, however from 1534 onwards, Ava came under constant raids by the Taungoo dynasty from Upper Burma. King Takayutpi could not marshal the kingdom's much greater resources and workforce against the much smaller Taungoo, led by King Tabinshwehti and his deputy general Bayinnaung. Taungoo captured Bago and the Irrawaddy Delta in 1538–39 and Mottama in 1541. The surrendered Pegu officials were offered amnesty and a pardon by Bayinnaung; they accepted and were placed in their old positions.

Hanthawaddy briefly revived in 1550 after Tabinshwehti was assassinated. But the "kingdom" did not extend much outside the city of Bago. Bayinnaung quickly defeated the rebellion in March 1552. Though Taungoo kings would rule all of Lower Burma well into the mid-18th century, the golden age of Hanthawaddy was fondly remembered by the Mon people of Lower Burma. In 1740, they rose up against a weak Taungoo Dynasty on its last legs and founded the restored Hanthawaddy kingdom.

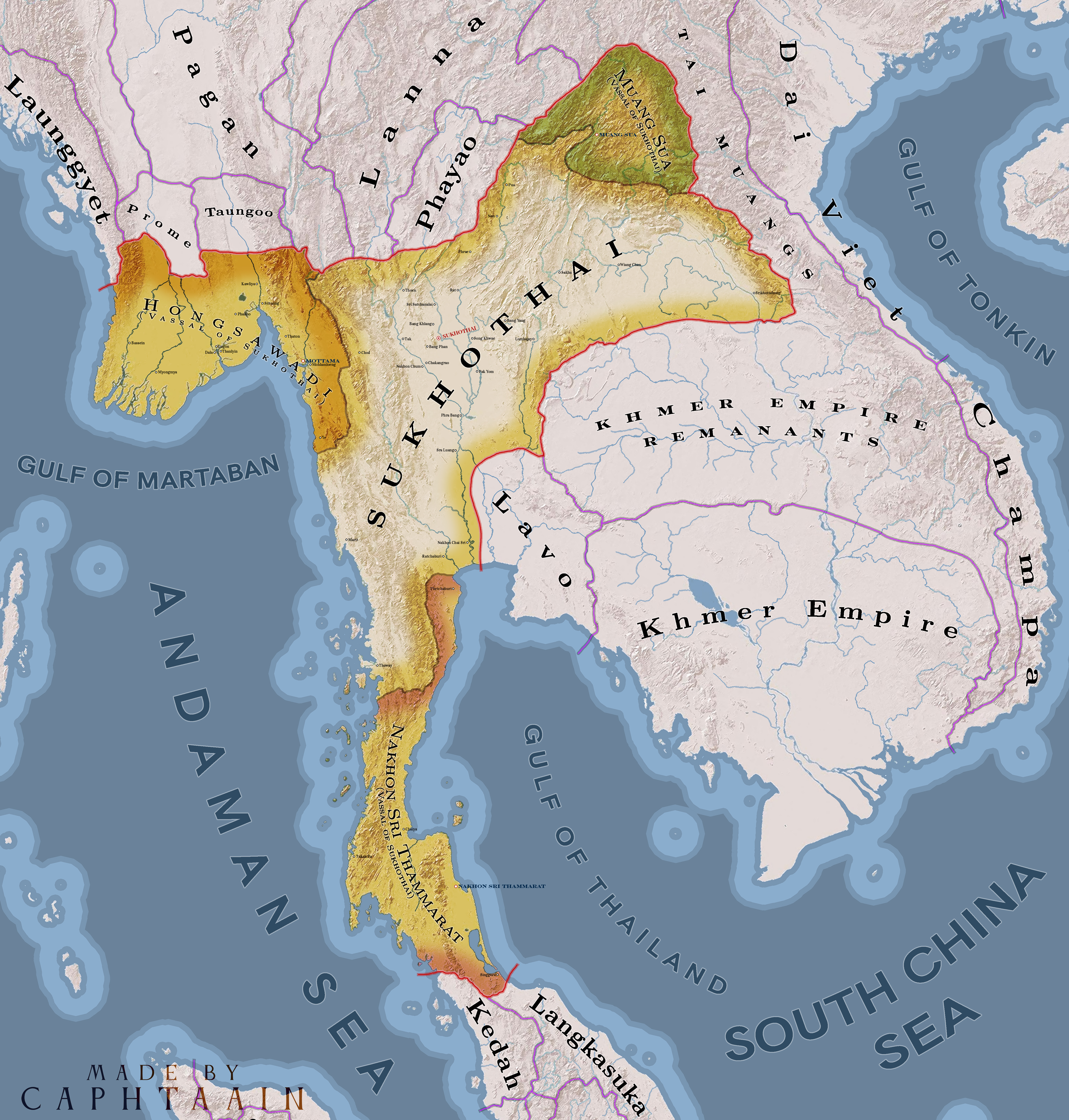
Hanthawaddy kingdom (Hongsawadi) as a vassal of the Sukhothai kingdom in 1293

== See also ==
- List of Hanthawaddy monarchs
- Hanthawaddy kings family tree

== Bibliography ==
- Harvey, G. E. (1925). History of Burma: From the Earliest Times to 10 March 1824. London: Frank Cass & Co. Ltd.
- Htin Aung, Maung (1967). A History of Burma. New York and London: Columbia University Press. LCCN 67-25984. OCLC 473616604.
- Myint-U, Thant (2006). The River of Lost Footsteps: Histories of Burma. Farrar, Straus and Giroux. ISBN 978-0374163426.
- Pan Hla, Nai (2005) [1968]. Razadarit Ayedawbon (in Burmese) (8th printing ed.). Yangon: Armanthit Sarpay.
