= Yaza Dewi =

Yaza Dewi (Pali: Rājadevī) may refer to:

- Yaza Dewi of Pagan, Chief Queen of Pagan (r. 1235–1251)
- Mwei Ma-Gu-Thauk, Queen of Hanthawaddy (r. c. 1350–1384)
- Piya Yaza Dewi, Chief Queen of Hanthawaddy (r. 1384–1392)
- Mwei Ohn-Naung, Chief Queen of Hanthawaddy (r. 1392–1421)
- Yaza Dewi (Binnya Ran I), Chief Queen of Hanthawaddy (c. 1424–1446?)
- Yaza Dewi (Dhammazedi): Chief Queen of Hanthawaddy (r. 1471–1492)
- Yaza Dewi (Binnya Ran II): Queen of Hanthawaddy (r. 1492?–1526?)
- Yaza Dewi of Toungoo, Queen of Toungoo (r. 1516–1530)
- Yaza Dewi of Pegu, Queen of the Central Palace of Toungoo Dynasty (r. 1563–1564)
- Thiri Yaza Dewi, Queen of the Northern Palace of Toungoo Dynasty (r. 1583–1599)
