= Lauk Shein =

Burmese politician and rebel (died 1390)

Lauk Shein; လောက်ရှိန်

Governor of Bassein
- Reign: by 1380s – 1390
- Predecessor: ?
- Successor: Thilawa
- Monarch: Binnya U (until 1384); Laukpya (1384–1390)
- Died: 1390; Bassein (Pathein)
- Father: Laukpya

Lauk Shein (Burmese: လောက်ရှိန်, pronounced [laʊ̯ʔ ʃèɪɰ̃]; also Lauk Na-Rein, Mon: လိုက်နရိန်, Burmese: လောက်နရိန်; (Note: (Pan Hla 2005: 190 & footnote 1): Lauk Shein is the name used in the Burmese language Razadarit Ayedawbon. The transliteration according to the Mon language Pak Lat Chronicles is Lauk Na-Rein.) died 1390) was governor of Bassein (Pathein), at least from the 1380s to 1390. A son of Viceroy Laukpya of Myaungmya, Shein actively participated in his father's rebellion against King Razadarit of Hanthawaddy, and fought in the subsequent Ava–Hanthawaddy War (1385–1391) on the Ava side.

Though he successfully defended Bassein in 1389, Shein decided to evacuate the port city when his father's provincial capital Myaungmya unexpectedly fell in 1390. His caravan of elephants carrying loads of treasures soon found their path to Ava territory blocked by a Hanthawaddy battalion, and were forced to make a detour to Sandoway in Arakan. However, the governor of Sandoway gave him up to the pursuing Hanthawaddy troops. Shein was brought back to Bassein where he was executed on Razadarit's order.

== Background ==
Lauk Shein was born to a large powerful noble family in the Mon-speaking Martaban–Hanthawaddy Kingdom. Through his father Viceroy Laukpya of Myaungmya Province, he was a half cousin, twice-removed of King Binnya U (r. 1348–1384), and half-cousin, once-removed of King Razadarit (r. 1384–1421). (Note: (Pan Hla 2005: 40): Laukpya's father [Shein's paternal grandfather] Saw E Pyathat was a son of Smin E Kan-Kaung, a half-brother of King Saw Zein (r. 1323–1330). It means Saw E Pyathat and Binnya U were half cousins of the same generation; Laukpya was King Binnya U's half-cousin, once removed; and Shein was Binnya U's half-cousin, twice removed, and Razadarit's half-cousin, once removed.) (Although it can be inferred from chronicle reporting that his mother may have been the chief consort of Laukpya, chronicles nonetheless do not explicitly state who his mother was. (Note: (Pan Hla 2005: 49–51) provides a list of Laukpya's children by 16 different mothers (using the Razadarit Ayedawbon and the Pak Lat Chronicles). The list does not state Lauk Shein's birth name or personal name, or mother's name. However, Shein's mother may have been his father's chief consort since Shein later became governor of Bassein, which per (Pan Hla 2005: 178) was the second most important city in the province, which traditionally would have gone to the eldest son by the consort of the highest rank. Furthermore, per (Pan Hla 2005: 178), Laukpya appointed Ma Pyit-Nwe, a son by the chief consort, to defend the provincial capital Myaungmya itself.))

Shein was part of his father's exceptionally large family. He had either 67 or 69 (half) siblings. (Note: (Pan Hla 2005: 49–51, 51 footnote 1): The Razadarit Ayedawbon says Laukpya had a total of 70 children (22 daughters and 48 sons) by 16 child-bearing wives but its detailed listing of the children yields only 68 children (16 daughters and 52 sons).) When his father, who had been the de facto independent ruler of the Myaungmya province since 1364, raised a rebellion in 1385 against the new king Razadarit at Pegu, Shein was governor of Bassein (Pathein), the second most important district in the province.

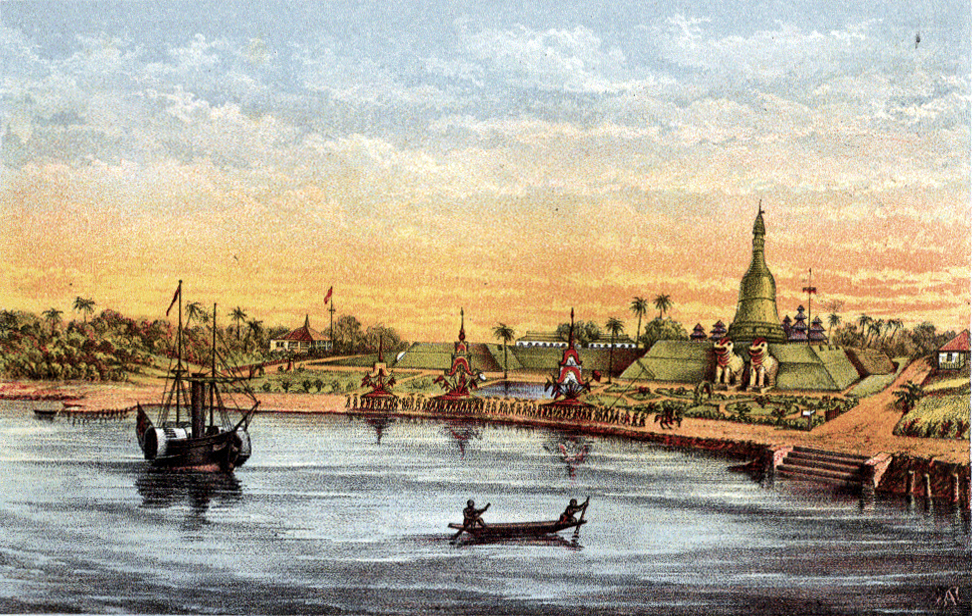
A 19th-century painting of Bassein's shoreline

== Ava–Hanthawaddy War ==
Shein is remembered in Burmese history for the 1389 battle of Bassein, and his subsequent flight to Sandoway (Thandwe) during the Ava–Hanthawaddy War (1385–1391). In 1389, Shein led the defense of his port city with the help of his half-brother Bya Kun and his brother-in-law Bya Kyin. (Note: The deputies' names were Bya Kun and Smin Bya Kyin according to the Burmese language Razadarit Ayedawbon chronicle per (Fernquest 2006: 8). In Pan Hla's version of the chronicle, (Pan Hla 2005: 178), which also includes the narratives of the Mon language Pak Lat Chronicles, the deputies' names were Lauk Yon and Lauk Thein.) Their heavily fortified port city's defenses, which also included war boats manned by foreign mercenaries equipped with guns, (Note: (Phayre 1967: 69, footnote 1): The "gun" here probably was "a jingal, a metal tube about three feet long, mounted on a wooden stand, and throwing a ball, generally less than one pound weight". (Fernquest 2006: 8): The foreign mercenaries here likely referred to Indian Ocean Muslim mercenaries.) withstood repeated frontal charges by Hanthawaddy forces, inflicted heavy casualties on the enemy, and eventually forced them to retreat.

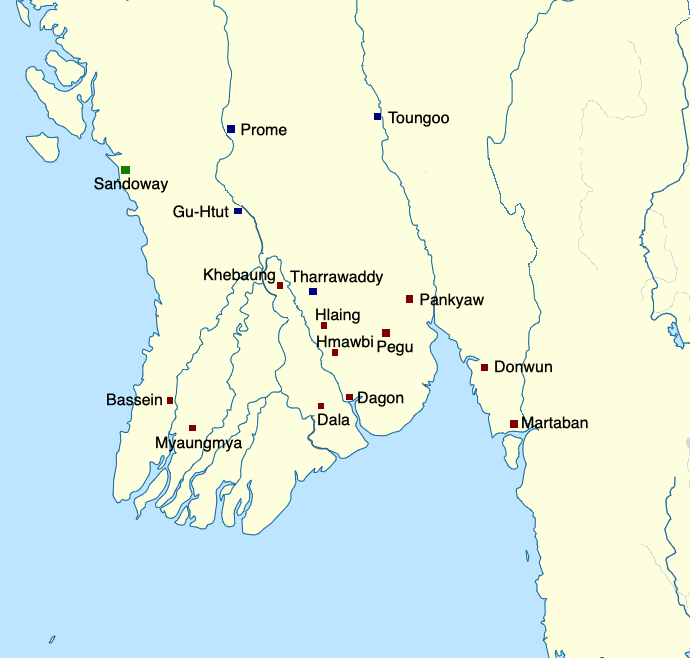
Lauk Shein fled to Sandoway when his path to Prome was blocked

The reprieve was short-lived however. When Razadarit's forces unexpectedly captured his father's capital Myaungmya in early 1390, Shein and his deputies quickly decided to evacuate Bassein for Prome (Pyay), Ava's southernmost garrison. In a fateful decision, Shein also decided to take "ten elephant loads of gold and silver" with him. This attracted Razadarit's attention. Upon hearing the news about the evacuation two days after Myaungmya's fall, Razadarit dispatched a battalion to catch Shein. While his deputies successfully made it to Prome, Shein's contingent was not as fast. They soon found their path to Prome blocked by the Hanthawaddy battalion, and had to make a detour to Sandoway (Thandwe), 300 km (190 mi) northwest of Bassein, in Arakan.

At Sandoway, Shein persuaded Sandoway's governor to take him in. But when the Hanthawaddy battalion led by Byat Za showed up soon after and laid siege to the town, the town's governor agreed to give up Lauk Shein and his elephant loads of treasures. Shein, his family and treasures were brought back to Bassein, where Razadarit was waiting. The king had Shein executed but sent Shein's family to Martaban (Mottama). He then appointed Thilawa, one of his ministers, as governor of Bassein.

Had he made it to Prome, Shein might have had a career similar to those of his deputies. Both his deputies were promptly appointed to high office by King Swa Saw Ke of Ava. Bya Kun became Gov. Nawrahta of Salin (r. 1390–1426), and Bya Kyin Gov. Letya Pyanchi of Prome (r. 1390–1413).

== Bibliography ==
- Fernquest, Jon (Spring 2006). "Rajadhirat's Mask of Command: Military Leadership in Burma (c. 1384–1421)" (PDF). SBBR. 4 (1). Archived from the original (PDF) on 19 February 2009.
- Harvey, G. E. (1925). History of Burma: From the Earliest Times to 10 March 1824. London: Frank Cass & Co. Ltd.
- Kala, U (2006) [1724]. Maha Yazawin (in Burmese). Vol. 1–3 (4th printing ed.). Yangon: Ya-Pyei Publishing.
- Pan Hla, Nai (2005) [1968]. Razadarit Ayedawbon (in Burmese) (8th printing ed.). Yangon: Armanthit Sarpay.
- Phayre, Lt. Gen. Sir Arthur P. (1967) [1883]. History of Burma. London: Susil Gupta.
- Royal Historical Commission of Burma (2003) [1832]. Hmannan Yazawin (in Burmese). Vol. 1–3. Yangon: Ministry of Information, Myanmar.

Lauk Shein Martaban Dynasty Died: 1390
Royal titles
| Preceded by ? | Governor of Bassein by 1380s – 1390 | Succeeded by Thilawa |
