= Mi U-Si =

Thiri Maya Dewi Mi U-Si သီရိမာယာဒေဝီ မည်ဦးစည်

Queen of the Central Palace of Hanthawaddy
- Tenure: c. April 1392 – c. 1421
- Predecessor: Thiri Yaza Dewi
- Successor: unknown
- Spouse: Razadarit
- House: Hanthawaddy Pegu
- Father: Saw Ye-Bein
- Religion: Theravada Buddhism

Thiri Maya Dewi Mi U-Si (Burmese: သီရိမာယာဒေဝီ မည်ဦးစည်, pronounced [θìɹḭ màjà dèwì mì ʔú sì] (Note: In modern Burmese pronunciation, her name would be pronounced [mjì ʔú sì]. But the Mon name မည် has been transliterated as "Mi" [mì] (as in Tala Mi Daw).)) was a principal queen of King Razadarit of Hanthawaddy Pegu from 1392 to 1421.

== Brief ==
According to the Razadarit Ayedawbon chronicle, the queen was the youngest daughter of Saw Ye-Bein, a senior minister at the Hanthawaddy court. Her personal name was Mi U-Si (မည်ဦးစည်). She had two elder sisters Mwei Ohn-Naung and Mwei Auk In April 1392, she became a senior queen of King Razadarit, with the title of Thiri Maya Dewi (Pali: Sirimāyādevī). Her two sisters were also raised as queens at the same ceremony.

She and her sisters were first cousins once removed of the king. Their father was a first cousin of Razadarit. Their paternal grandfather Binnya Thein was a noble from Chiang Mai who after a disagreement with the king of Chiang Mai had sought refuge at the court of King Binnya U. Their paternal grandmother was Tala Saw Lun, a daughter of King Saw Zein.

== Ancestry ==
Ancestry of Queen Thiri Maya Dewi

8. unnamed
4. Binnya Thein of Chiang Mai
9. unnamed
2. Saw Ye-Bein
10. Saw Zein
5. Tala Saw Lun
11. unnamed
1. Mi U-Si
12. unnamed
6. unnamed
13. unnamed
3. unnamed
14. unnamed
7. unnamed
15. unnamed

== Bibliography ==
- Pan Hla, Nai (1968). Razadarit Ayedawbon (in Burmese) (8th printing, 2005 ed.). Yangon: Armanthit Sarpay.

Mi U-Si Hanthawaddy Dynasty
Royal titles
Preceded by Thiri Yaza Dewi	Queen of the Central Palace of Hanthawaddy c. April 1392 – c. 1421	Unknown
