= List of rulers of Bassein =

This is a list of rulers of Bassein (Pathein), one of the three main Mon-speaking provinces of Lower Burma. (now Myanmar).

== Pagan period ==
Name	Term From	Term Until	Relationship to predecessor(s)	Overlord	Notes
Uzana of Bassein	?	1287		Narathihapate	

== Hanthawaddy period ==
Name	Term From	Term Until	Relationship to predecessor(s)	Overlord	Notes
Smin Nyi-San	?	1323/24			In revolt (1323/24)
?					
Lauk Shein	by 1380s	1390		Binnya U (to 1384); Laukpya (to 1390)	
Thilawa	1390	1408	None (appointed)	Razadarit	Former minister at the court
Dein Mani-Yut	1408	1415	None (appointed)	Razadarit	
Smin Awa Naing	1415	1421	None (appointed)	Razadarit	
Binnya Ran I	1421	1424	None (son of Razadarit)	Binnya Dhammaraza	Titular lord of Bassein since 1412
?					

== See also ==
- Hanthawaddy kingdom
- List of Burmese monarchs
- List of rulers of Pegu
- List of rulers of Martaban

== Bibliography ==
- Pan Hla, Nai (2005) [1968]. Razadarit Ayedawbon (in Burmese) (8th printing ed.). Yangon: Armanthit Sarpay.
