= Thilawa of Bassein =

Governor of Bassein (1390-1408)

Thilawa

Governor of Bassein
- In office c. March 1390 – c. April 1408
- Monarch: Razadarit
- Preceded by: Lauk Shein
- Succeeded by: Dein Mani-Yut

Minister
- In office ?–1390
- Monarch: Razadarit (?−1390)

Personal details
- Born: Unknown Hanthawaddy kingdom
- Died: Unknown Hanthawaddy kingdom

Thilawa (Burmese: သီလဝ, pronounced [θìləwa̰]) was governor of Bassein from 1390 to 1408 during the reign of King Razadarit of Hanthawaddy Pegu. Prior to the governorship, he was a minister at the royal court in Pegu (Bago). In 1390, he was appointed to be governor of Bassein by the king whose forces had just conquered the town during the First Ava–Hanthawaddy War. Thilawa held the post until the start of the Third Ava–Hanthawaddy War c. April 1408 (Note: According to (Pan Hla 2005: 240), Thilawa was removed as governor of Bassein after victorious Hanthawaddy had arrived back from Arakan. Chronicles report slightly different dates for Hanthawaddy Pegu's takeover of Arakan. (Maha Yazawin Vol. 1 2006: 334) says Pegu forces had taken Arakan by Kason 770 ME (29 March 1408 to 23 April 1408); (Yazawin Thit Vol. 1 2012: 228) gives Late Tagu 969 ME (25 February 1408 to 24 March 1408); (Hmannan Vol. 1 2003: 477) gives Late Kason 769 ME (25 March to 28 March 1408).) when Razadarit removed him from the office, and appointed Dein Mani-Yut instead.

== Bibliography ==
- Kala, U (2006) [1724]. Maha Yazawin (in Burmese). Vol. 1–3 (4th printing ed.). Yangon: Ya-Pyei Publishing.
- Maha Sithu (2012) [1798]. Kyaw Win; Thein Hlaing (eds.). Yazawin Thit (in Burmese). Vol. 1–3 (2nd ed.). Yangon: Ya-Pyei Publishing.
- Pan Hla, Nai (2005) [1968]. Razadarit Ayedawbon (in Burmese) (8th printing ed.). Yangon: Armanthit Sarpay.
- Royal Historical Commission of Burma (2003) [1832]. Hmannan Yazawin (in Burmese). Vol. 1–3. Yangon: Ministry of Information, Myanmar.
