= Mwei Auk =

Lawka Dewi Mwei Auk လောကဒေဝီ မွေ့အောက်

Queen of the Northern Palace of Hanthawaddy
- Tenure: c. April 1392 – c. 1421
- Predecessor: Tala Mi Daw
- Successor: unknown
- Spouse: Razadarit
- House: Hanthawaddy Pegu
- Father: Saw Ye-Bein
- Religion: Theravada Buddhism

Lawka Dewi Mwei Auk (Burmese: လောကဒေဝီ မွေ့အောက်, pronounced [lɔ́ka̰ dèwì mwḛ ʔauʔ]) was a principal queen consort of King Razadarit of Hanthawaddy Pegu from 1392 to 1421.

== Brief ==
According to the Razadarit Ayedawbon chronicle, the queen was the middle daughter of Saw Ye-Bein, a senior minister at the Hanthawaddy court. Her personal name was Mwei Auk (မွေ့အောက်). She had an elder sister Mwei Ohn-Naung and a younger sister Mi U-Si In April 1392, she became a senior queen of King Razadarit, with the title of Lawka Dewi (Pali: Lokadevī). Her two sisters were also raised as queens at the same ceremony.

She and her sisters were first cousins once removed of the king. Their father was a first cousin of Razadarit. Their paternal grandfather Binnya Thein was a noble from Chiang Mai who after a disagreement with the king of Chiang Mai had sought refuge at the court of King Binnya U. Their paternal grandmother was Tala Saw Lun, a daughter of King Saw Zein.

== Ancestry ==
Ancestry of Queen Lawka Dewi

8. unnamed
4. Binnya Thein of Chiang Mai
9. unnamed
2. Saw Ye-Bein
10. Saw Zein
5. Tala Saw Lun
11. unnamed
1. Mwei Auk
12. unnamed
6. unnamed
13. unnamed
3. unnamed
14. unnamed
7. unnamed
15. unnamed

== Bibliography ==
- Pan Hla, Nai (1968). Razadarit Ayedawbon (in Burmese) (8th printing, 2005 ed.). Yangon: Armanthit Sarpay.

Mwei Auk Hanthawaddy Dynasty
Royal titles
Preceded by Tala Mi Daw	Queen of the Northern Palace of Hanthawaddy c. April 1392 – c. 1421	Unknown
