= Piya Yaza Dewi =

Piya Yaza Dewi ပီယရာဇဒေဝီ
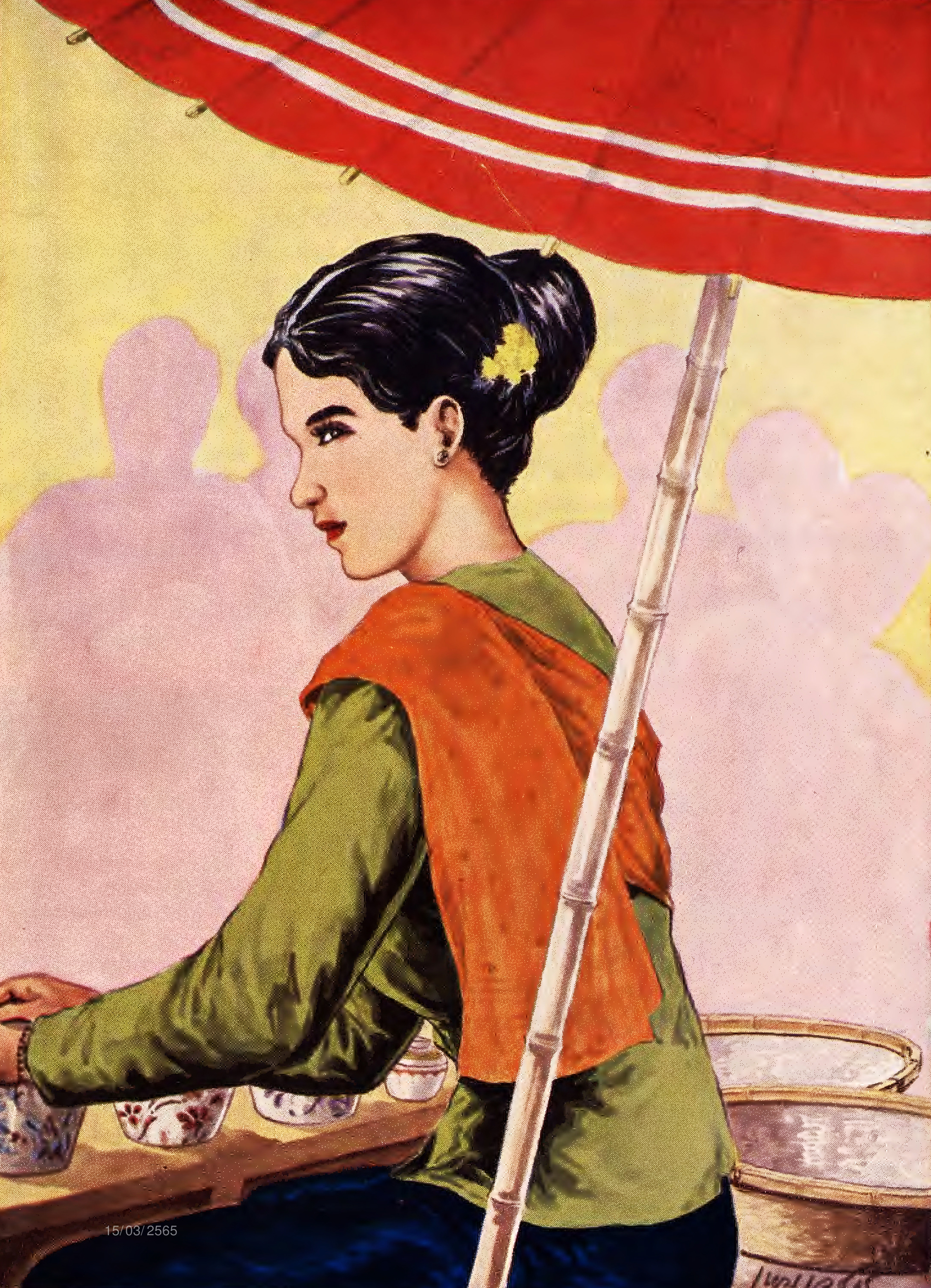
- "Mwei Maneit" by Hem Vejakorn, 1964.

Chief queen consort of Hanthawaddy
- Tenure: 5 January 1384 – c. April 1392
- Predecessor: Hnin An Daung
- Successor: Yaza Dewi
- Born: c. 1360s
- Died: c. April 1392; Kason 754 ME; Pegu (Bago)
- Spouse: Ma Chut Sut (?–1383); Razadarit (1383–92)
- Issue: none reported
- House: Hanthawaddy Pegu
- Religion: Theravada Buddhism

Piya Yaza Dewi (Burmese: ပီယရာဇဒေဝီ, pronounced [pìja̰ jàzà dèwì]; Pali: Piyarājadevī; c. 1360s – c. April 1392) was the chief queen consort of King Razadarit of Hanthawaddy Pegu from 1384 to 1392. Razadarit's reaffirmation of Piya Yaza Dewi as the chief queen in 1390 contributed to Queen Tala Mi Daw's subsequent suicide.

== Brief ==
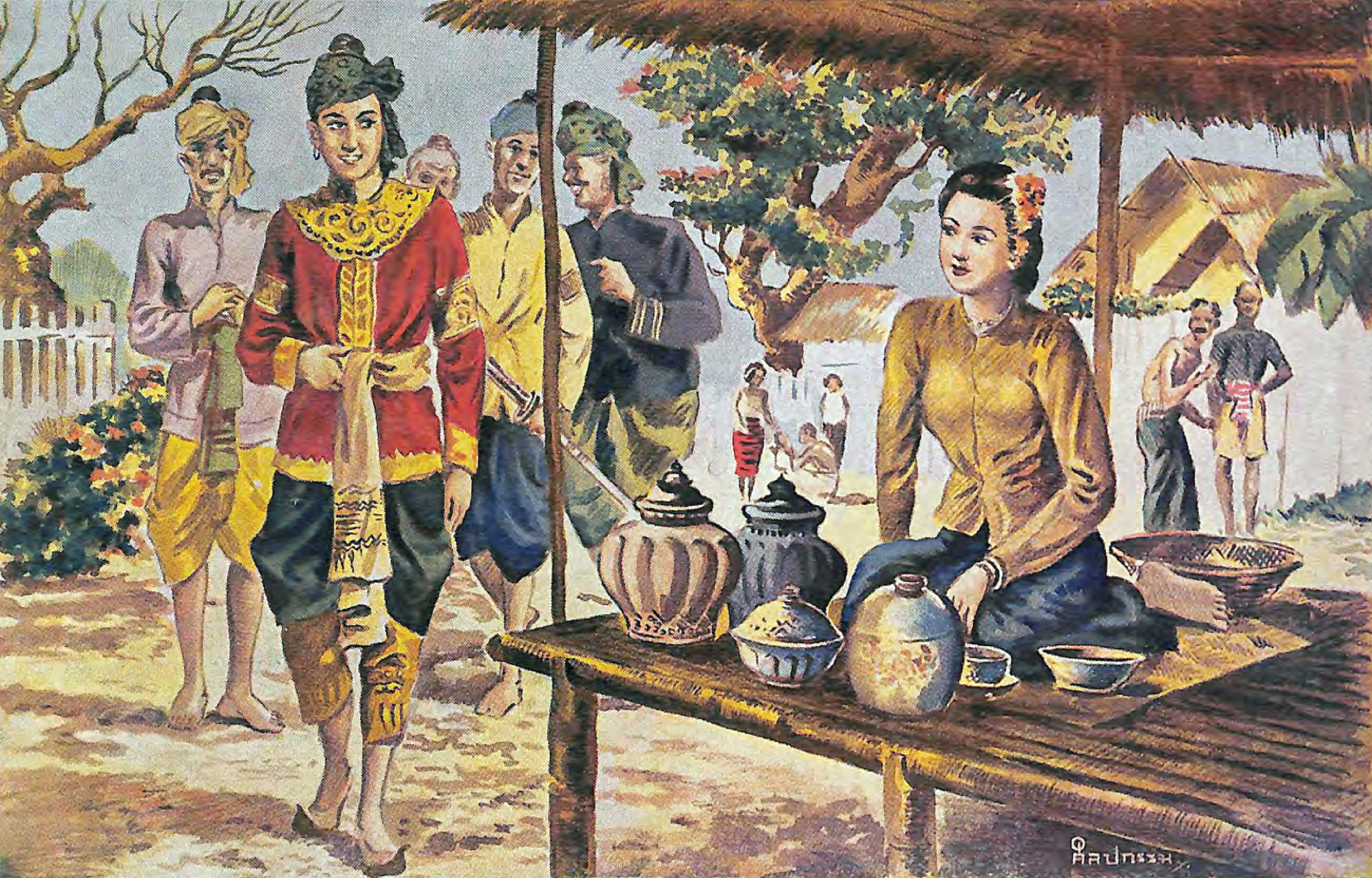
Prince Binnya Nwe met Mwei Maneit in a market at Dagon. An illustration from Rachathirat, a Thai version of Razadarit Ayedawbon, 1946 printed edition.

According to the Razadarit Ayedawbon chronicle, the future queen was a commoner named Mwei Maneit (မွေ့ မနိတ်; "Miss Ruby"). (Note: (Pan Hla 2005: 103, footnote 3): Mwei Maneit is a Mon language name, which translates to Me Padamya in Burmese (မယ် ပတ္တမြား, "Miss Ruby").) She was a flower seller (or cooking oil seller). (Note: (Pan Hla 2005: 103, footnote 3): Flower seller per Razadarit Ayedawbon but cooking oil seller per the Pak Lat Chronicles.) She was married to Ma Chut Sut (also known as Ma Aung Sut). One morning in c. May/June 1383, (Note: (Pan Hla 2005: 94): Razadarit left the capital Pegu (Bago) for Dagon to raise a rebellion on Tuesday, 3rd waxing of Nayon 745 ME (Monday, 4 May 1383). He met Mwei Maneit not too long after he got to Dagon.) Prince Binnya Nwe who had started a rebellion against his father, King Binnya U, saw her at the outskirts of Dagon. The prince was taken by Mwei Maneit's beauty, and took her. Her husband fled to Pegu, and reported the news to Princess Maha Dewi, the prince's aunt and adoptive mother. It wasn't just the husband that reacted to the news badly. At Pegu, Prince Binnya Nwe's first wife, Tala Mi Daw, who had just given birth to their first child Bawlawkyantaw, was deeply hurt.

At any rate, Maneit became a wife of the rebel prince in exile. About seven months later, she became the chief queen of the Kingdom of Hanthawaddy. On 2 January 1384, King Binnya U died. Two days later, the court accepted the rebel son Binnya Nwe, who had returned to Pegu, as king. The commoner was not Razadarit's first choice to be the chief queen. Nwe called for Tala Mi Daw, who was also his half-sister and of royal birth, but she refused to see him. In response, Nwe held the coronation ceremony the next day, 5 January 1384, (Note: The chronicle Razadarit Ayedawbon (Pan Hla 2005: 158) says she became queen on Tuesday, 1st waxing of Tabodwe 745 ME, which translates to Thursday, 24 December 1383. But 1st waxing is a typographical error. Per the Burmese language version of the chronicle (Pan Hla 2005: 356, footnote 1) Razadarit became king on Monday, 12th waxing of Tabodwe 745 ME (Monday, 4 Jan 1384). It means she became queen on Tuesday, 13th waxing of Tabodwe 745 ME (5 Jan 1384).) with Maneit as his chief queen. He took the title "Razadarit", and gave Maneit the title "Piya Yaza Dewi".

The young king's relationship with his first wife never recovered, and Piya Yaza Dewi remained the chief queen. Her position was once again reaffirmed in 1390. That year, Razadarit held another, grander, coronation ceremony to commemorate his success in reunifying three Mon-speaking regions. He had Piya Yaza Dewi by his side as the chief queen at the ceremony. Tala Mi daw was again deeply hurt. The arguments between them escalated. The king now took away Tala Mi Daw's family heirlooms—a dozen rings given by their father King Binnya U—and gave them to Piya Yaza Dewi. Bitter and heartbroken, Tala Mi Daw committed suicide. Razadarit then ordered their only child Bawlawkyantaw to be executed because he suspected that the young son would later avenge for his mother. According to legend, Bawlawkyantaw before his death swore to be reborn as a prince of Ava, and reincarnated as Prince Minye Kyawswa of Ava, who later became Razadarit's nemesis.

Piya Yaza Dewi herself died c. April 1392 (or 1393). (Note: The Razadarit Ayedawbon chronicle suggests that she died c. April 1393 (Kason, 755 ME). But that date is in conflict with the reporting by the standard royal chronicles. The Razadarit (Pan Hla 2005: 203) states that the queen died after Ava troops retreated from the Tharrawaddy frontier, and that Razadarit raised Mwei Ohn-Naung as the chief queen in the month of Kason of that year, without explicitly identifying the year. The prior year mentioned in the chronicle was on (Pan Hla 2005: 197), which says that Ava troops came down to retake Gu-Htut in 754 ME (29 March 1392 to 28 March 1393), and after a dry season campaign, the troops retreated from Tharrawaddy. The narrative (Pan Hla 2005: 197–203) suggests by the time the queen died, the year had already turned (since he raised the next queen in the month of Kason.) But the dateline of the narrative is inconsistent with that of the standard chronicles. According to (Maha Yazawin Vol. 1 2006: 301–303) and (Hmannan Vol. 1 2003: 429–432), Ava troops marched south to retake Gu Htut in 752 ME (1390/91), and went to Tharrawaddy in the dry season of 753 ME (1391/92), and left the frontier in or before 754 ME. According to the standard chronicles, in the dry season of 754 ME (1392–93), Ava was at war with Mohnyin in the north, and not in the south. It means, if Queen Piya did die after the Ava troops had just left as Razadarit suggests, she likely died a year earlier, in or before Kason 754 ME (23 March 1392 to 21 April 1392).) Chronicles do not report any children by her. She was succeeded by Mwei Ohn-Naung as chief queen.

== Bibliography ==
- Harvey, G. E. (1925). History of Burma: From the Earliest Times to 10 March 1824. London: Frank Cass & Co. Ltd.
- Htin Aung, Maung (1967). A History of Burma. New York and London: Cambridge University Press.
- Pan Hla, Nai (2005) [1968]. Razadarit Ayedawbon (in Burmese) (8th printing ed.). Yangon: Armanthit Sarpay.

Piya Yaza Dewi Hanthawaddy Dynasty Born: c. 1360s Died: c. April 1392
Royal titles
Preceded by Hnin An Daung	Chief queen consort of Hanthawaddy; 5 January 1384 – c. April 1392	Succeeded by Yaza Dewi
