= Mwei Ohn-Naung =

Yaza Dewi Mwei Ohn-Naung ရာဇာဒေဝီ မွေ့ အုန်နောင်

Chief queen consort of Hanthawaddy
- Tenure: c. April 1392 – c. 1421
- Predecessor: Piya Yaza Dewi
- Successor: unknown
- Spouse: Razadarit
- House: Hanthawaddy Pegu
- Father: Saw Ye-Bein
- Religion: Theravada Buddhism

Yaza Dewi Mwei Ohn-Naung (Burmese: ရာဇာဒေဝီ မွေ့ အုန်နောင်, pronounced [jàzà dèwì mwḛ ʔòɴ nàʊɴ]) was the chief queen consort of King Razadarit of Hanthawaddy Pegu from 1392 to 1421.

== Brief ==
According to the Razadarit Ayedawbon chronicle, the queen was the eldest daughter of Saw Ye-Bein, a senior minister at the Hanthawaddy court. Her personal name was Mwei Ohn-Naung (မွေ့ အုန်နောင်). She had two younger sisters, Mwei Auk and Mi U-Si. In April 1392, she was raised as the chief queen of King Razadarit, with the title of Yaza Dewi (Pali: Rājadevī). Her two sisters were also raised as queens at the same ceremony.

She and her sisters were first cousins once removed of the king. Their father was a first cousin of Razadarit. Their paternal grandfather Binnya Thein was a noble from Chiang Mai who after a disagreement with the king of Chiang Mai had sought refuge at the court of King Binnya U. Their paternal grandmother was Tala Saw Lun, a daughter of King Saw Zein.

== Ancestry ==
Ancestry of Queen Yaza Dewi

8. unnamed
4. Binnya Thein of Chiang Mai
9. unnamed
2. Saw Ye-Bein
10. Saw Zein
5. Tala Saw Lun
11. unnamed
1. Mwei Ohn-Naung
12. unnamed
6. unnamed
13. unnamed
3. unnamed
14. unnamed
7. unnamed
15. unnamed

== Bibliography ==
- Pan Hla, Nai (2005) [1968]. Razadarit Ayedawbon (in Burmese) (8th printing ed.). Yangon: Armanthit Sarpay.

Mwei Ohn-Naung Hanthawaddy Dynasty
Royal titles
Preceded by Piya Yaza Dewi	Chief queen consort of Hanthawaddy c. April 1392 – c. 1421	Unknown
