= Razadarit =

King of Hanthawaddy (r. 1384–1421)

Razadarit ရာဇာဓိရာဇ်
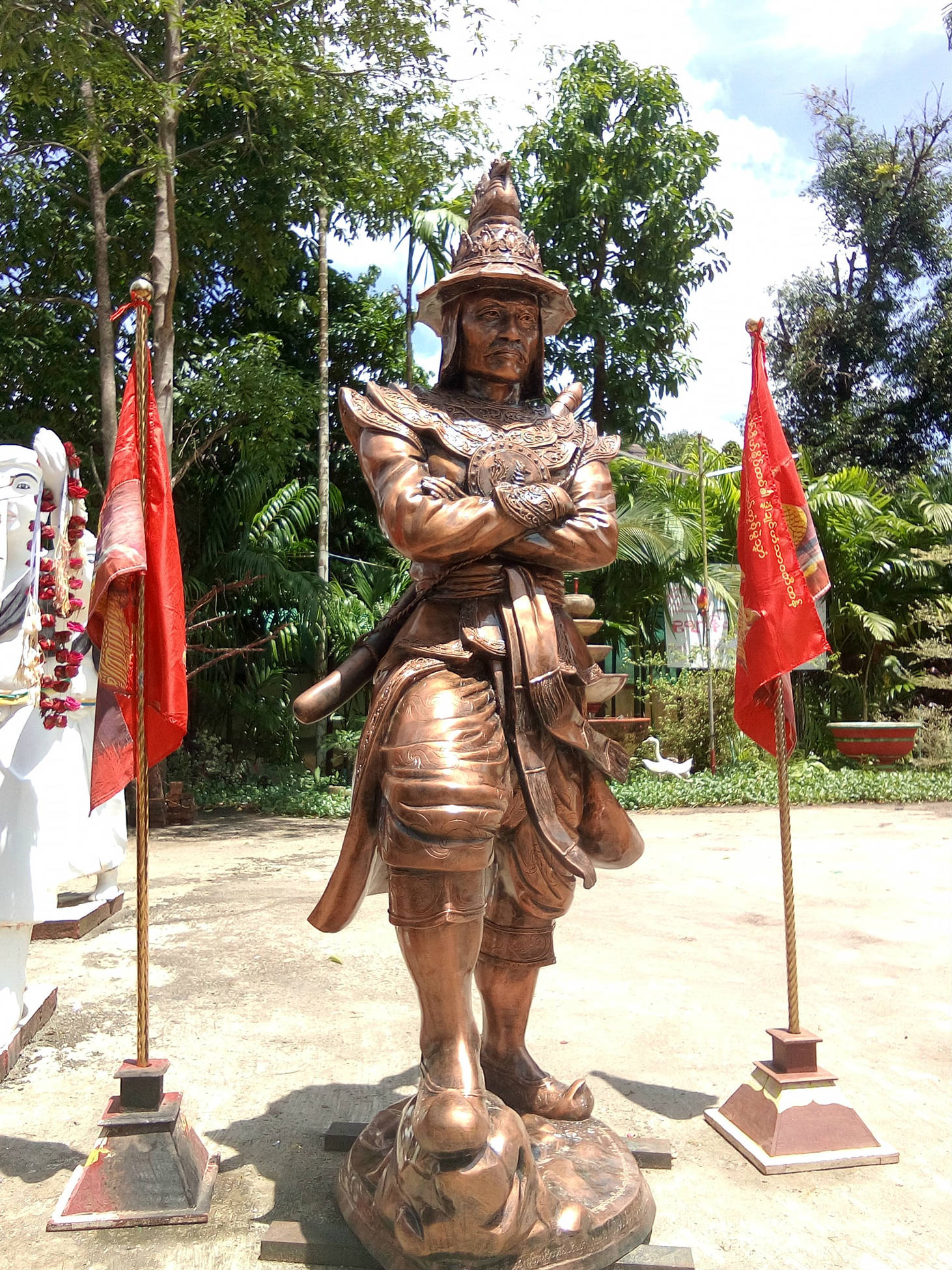
- Statue of Razadarit at Kamarwet, Mon State

King of Hanthawaddy
- Reign: 4 January 1384 – c. December 1421
- Coronation: 5 January 1384
- Predecessor: Binnya U
- Successor: Binnya Dhammaraza
- Co-Chief Ministers: Zeik-Bye (1384–1388); Byat Za (1388–1413); Dein Mani-Yut (1388–1421)
- Born: 28 January 1368; Friday, 8th waxing of Tabodwe 729 ME; Donwun; Martaban Kingdom
- Died: by 29 December 1421 (aged 53) by Monday, 7th waxing of Tabodwe 783 ME; Kama Thamein Paik; Hanthawaddy kingdom
- Burial: Pegu (Bago)
- Consort: Tala Mi Daw (1383–1390); Piya Yaza Dewi (1383–1392; Chief Queen); Yaza Dewi (1392–1421; Chief); Lawka Dewi (1392–1421); Thiri Maya Dewi Mi U-Si (1392–1421)
- Issue among others...: Baw Law Kyan Daw; Binnya Dhammaraza; Binnya Ran I Binnya Kyan; Binnya Set; Shin Saw Pu
Names
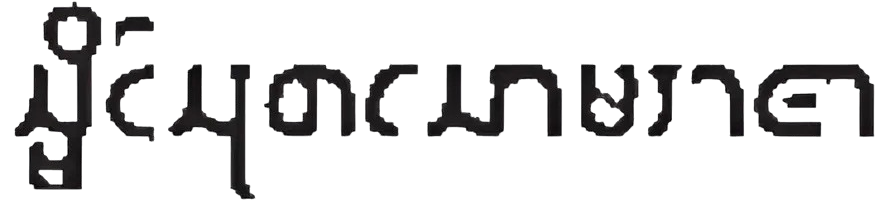
- Smiṅ Sutasoma Rājā
- House: Wareru
- Father: Binnya U
- Mother: Thiri Maya Dewi Mwei Daw
- Religion: Theravada Buddhism

Razadarit (Mon: ရာဇာဓိရာတ်, (Note: The spelling "ရာဇာဓိရာတ်" per Slapat Rajawan (Schmidt 1906: 118) and the 1485 Shwedagon Pagoda inscription (Pan Hla 2005: 368, footnote 1). Nai Pan Hla's Razadarit Ayedawbon (Pan Hla 2005), which provides equivalent Mon spellings, uses ရာဇာဓိရာဇ် for both Mon and Burmese; see (Pan Hla 2005: 395) in the Index section for the name ရာဇာဓိရာဇ်. ရာဇာဓိရာတ် may be an archaic spelling.); Burmese: ရာဇာဓိရာဇ်, Burmese pronunciation: [jàzàdəɹɪ̀ʔ] or [jàza̰dəɹɪ̀ʔ]; also spelled Yazadarit, Pali: Rājādhirāja "king of kings"; 1368–1421), personal name Pasoom-Paing-Cek (Mon: ပသုံပါၚ်စက် ; Burmese: ပသုန်ပန်စက် ), courtesy name Benya Noy (Mon: ဗညာနဲ,; Burmese: ဗညားနွဲ့, [bəɲá nwɛ̰]), was king of Hanthawaddy Pegu from 1384 to 1421. He successfully unified his Mon-speaking kingdom, and fended off major assaults by the Burmese-speaking Ava Kingdom (Inwa) in the Forty Years' War. The king also instituted an administrative system that left his successors with a far more integrated kingdom. He is one of the most famous kings in Burmese history.

Razadarit came to power at 16 after a rebellion against his father King Binnya U (r. 1348–1384), barely controlling the Pegu province. By his sheer will and military leadership, the young king not only defeated Ava's first wave of invasions (1385–1391) but also unified his kingdom in the process. After presiding over Pegu's emergence as a regional power, he twice renewed the war with Ava in the 1400s, and outlasted Ava's fierce counterattacks with the help of Hsenwi and Ming China. Between 1401 and 1418, he met Ava's King Minkhaung I and Crown Prince Minye Kyawswa head-on in Lower Burma, Upper Burma, and Arakan.

His life is recorded in a classic chronicle called Razadarit Ayedawbon. The king is remembered as a complex figure: an accomplished military leader who kept his kingdom independent; an able administrator who successfully integrated the provinces; and a ruthless paranoid figure, who drove many close to him to death. His battles against Minkhaung and Minye Kyawswa are still retold in Burmese popular culture.

== Early life ==
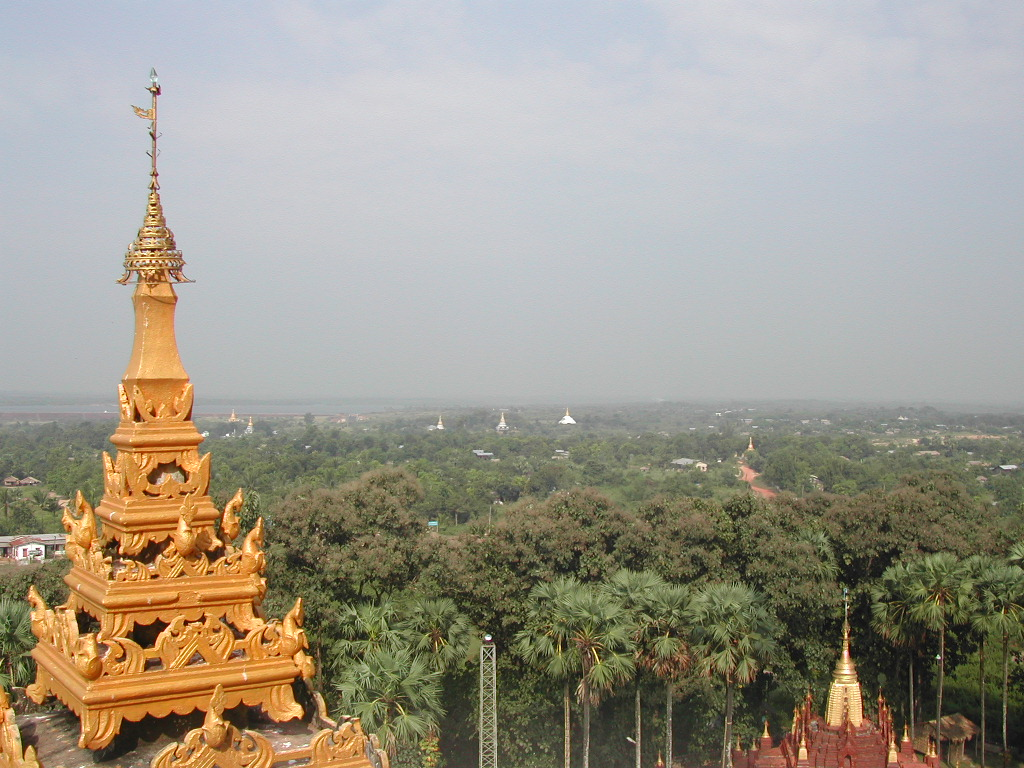
A view of present day Bago (Pegu). Binnya U moved his capital to Pegu in 1369/70 after having lost the dynasty's original capital Martaban in 1364.

The future king was born to Queen Thiri Maya Dewi and King Binnya U of Martaban in Donwun on 28 January 1368. His horoscopic name at birth was Pasoom-Paing-Cek (Mon: ပသုံပါၚ်စက်; Burmese: ပသုန်ပန်စက်, "One with Tongue Chakra"), because he has a chakra dot on his tongue as a birth mark. Later he was given the formal princely title of Benya Noy or Binnya Nweh (Mon: ဗညာနဲ,, Burmese: ဗညားနွဲ့, [bəɲá nwɛ̰]). (Note: (Pan Hla 2005: 61, 64 footnote 1, 366): Binnya Nwe was his formal princely title. (Aung-Thwin 2017: 260) and (Pan Hla 2005: 47): His horoscopic (zata) name at birth was Basum Bansak (ပသုန်ပန်စက်), according to the Razadarit Ayedawbon, and (ပသုန်ပါင်စက်), according to the Pak Lat.) His mother died shortly after giving birth to him, and he was adopted by his paternal aunt Princess Maha Dewi of Dagon.

He grew up in Dagon (modern downtown Yangon) in his early years before moving to Pegu (Bago) with his adoptive mother, c. mid 1370s. (Note: According to the Razadarit Ayedawbon (Pan Hla 2005: 61), Maha Dewi and Nwe came to the palace when Nwe "was able to run"; Binnya U was shocked by his son's appearance, remarking that Nwe bore little resemblance to him. Furthermore, per (Pan Hla 2005: 61–158) Maha Dewi spent much of her time at Pegu, starting from c. mid-1370s, when her brother's health declined, to her brother's death in 1384.) For whatever reason, Nwe never formed a close relationship with his father. Despite being the eldest son, he was not the heir-apparent; the king favored his only other son, Prince Baw Ngan-Mohn by his favorite queen Thiri Yaza Dewi, as his successor.

The father-son relationship only grew worse over time. By his early teens, Nwe was unruly, uncouth and ruthless in his father's eyes. The king, whose health had been deteriorating since the 1370s, told his sister that Nwe was not to ascend the throne.

== Rise to power ==
=== Conflicts with his father ===
Nwe responded in kind as soon as he was able. In 1382–1383, he took actions that would greatly anger his ailing father. First, the 14-year-old prince eloped with his younger half-sister Tala Mi Daw. The young couple was soon caught. The king was furious, and put Nwe in prison. Maha Dewi had to repeatedly plead with her brother to free Nwe, and allow the young couple to be married. But the marriage did little to improve the father-son relationship. Furthermore, Nwe had come to consider Maha Dewi, who by then had become the de facto power, as part of the problem. He had been persuaded by Minister Zeik-Bye that his adoptive mother was planning to put her lover (and Nwe's brother-in-law) Smim Maru on the throne. On 5 May 1383, Nwe left his newly wed (and pregnant) wife at the palace, fled to Dagon with 30 men, and seized the governor's residence there. (Note: (Pan Hla 2005: 92): Nwe had decided to revolt by the 6th waning of Kason 745 ME (Wednesday, 22 April 1383). (Pan Hla 2005: 94): Nwe and his men left Pegu in the wee hours of Tuesday, the 3rd waxing of Nayon 745 ME = Monday, 4 May 1383. The day had turned to Tuesday, 5 May 1383.)

At first, no one made much of the incident. It would have led to another quick arrest like before except that Zeik-Bye advised against taking any action, characterizing the insurrection as a harmless exercise by a restless teenager. The princess agreed with Zeik-Bye's assessment, and asked Nwe to return to Pegu. For his part, Nwe sent back a conciliatory letter, saying that he planned to return in three months. But it was a stalling tactic. He quietly went on recruiting local governors around Dagon to come over to his side. By August, he believed he had found sufficient local support that he sent missions to farther provincial capitals of Martaban (Mottama) and Myaungmya. The news of the plot reached Pegu soon after. Even then, Maha Dewi hoped to avoid a showdown, reluctantly authorizing a military expedition that would begin only at the end of the rainy season.

=== Open rebellion ===
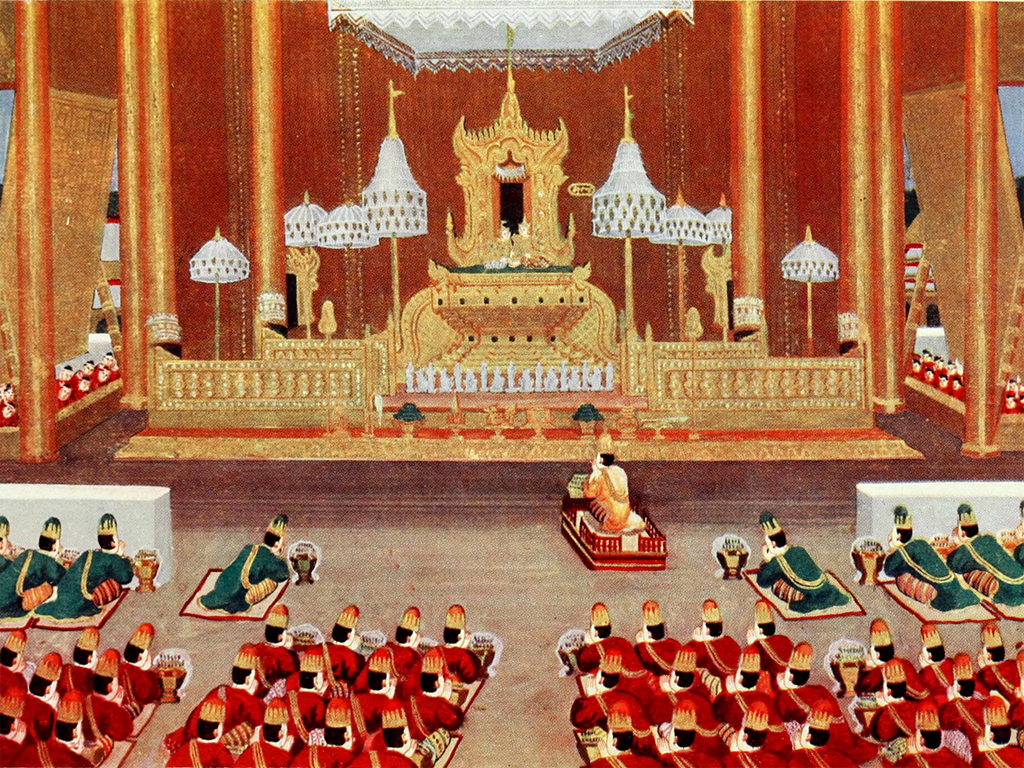
A 19th century Burmese painting depicting white umbrellas used as regalia

Nwe needed the delay. He had set up defensive preparations around Dagon but still did not have enough manpower. Despite his overtures, he still had not won support of Viceroy Byattaba of Martaban or Viceroy Laukpya of Myaungmya. Meanwhile, in October, the ailing king officially handed power to his sister, giving her the right to raise the white umbrella, a symbol of Burmese sovereigns. (Note: Per (Pan Hla 2005: 129), Binnya U transferred power on or a few days before the army left for Dagon on 3rd waxing of Nadaw 745 ME (Wednesday, 28 October 1383).) Officially referred to as Min Maha Dewi ("Queen Maha Dewi"), the princess-regent appointed Maru and Zeik-Bye to lead the expedition. On 28 October 1383, three armies—from Pegu, Martaban and Myaungmya—left for Dagon. (Note: (Pan Hla 2005: 129): According to the Razadarit Ayedawbon, three armies from Pegu, Martaban and Myaungmya marched to Dagon. The Pak Lat Chronicles say that an army from Toungoo went too. However, Toungoo was a vassal state of Ava in 1383 as an Ava loyalist Phaungga of Toungoo had taken over Toungoo per (Sein Lwin Lay 2006: 24–25).)

Nwe's plan was to avoid a fight with the full expedition force. He had help from Zeik-Bye who was able to forestall action when the three armies showed up outside Dagon. Nwe again sent envoys to Myaungmya and Martaban camps that the fight was strictly between him and his mother. The last-minute mission to the Myaungmya camp worked. Laukpya, who led the Myaungmya army, concluded that such a fight would be beneficial to his semi-independent rule, and turned back. The Martaban army came to a similar conclusion and turned back a few days later. Now only the Pegu army remained. On 19 November 1383, (Note: (Pan Hla 2005: 154): 10th waning of Nadaw 745 ME = 19 November 1383) Nwe moved in on Maru's vanguard troops. With Zeik-Bye's rearguard staying clear of the fight, Maru lost nerve, and fled.

It was only a small skirmish but Nwe had suddenly emerged as a serious contender for the throne. The court now seriously considered the possibility of a Nwe kingship, and Zeik-Bye and Maru factions openly bickered over the failure of the expedition. After learning about the confusion at the court from Zeik-Bye, Nwe marched to Pegu. By then, Maha Dewi was too weak. When Nwe and his small army appeared outside Pegu's walls on 10 December 1383, (Note: (Pan Hla 2005: 156): Thursday, 12th waning of Pyatho 745 ME = Sunday, 20 December 1383. It was more likely Thursday, 2nd waning of Pyatho 745 ME (Thursday, 10 December 1383).) she could do nothing other than hunker down inside the city walls.

=== Accession ===
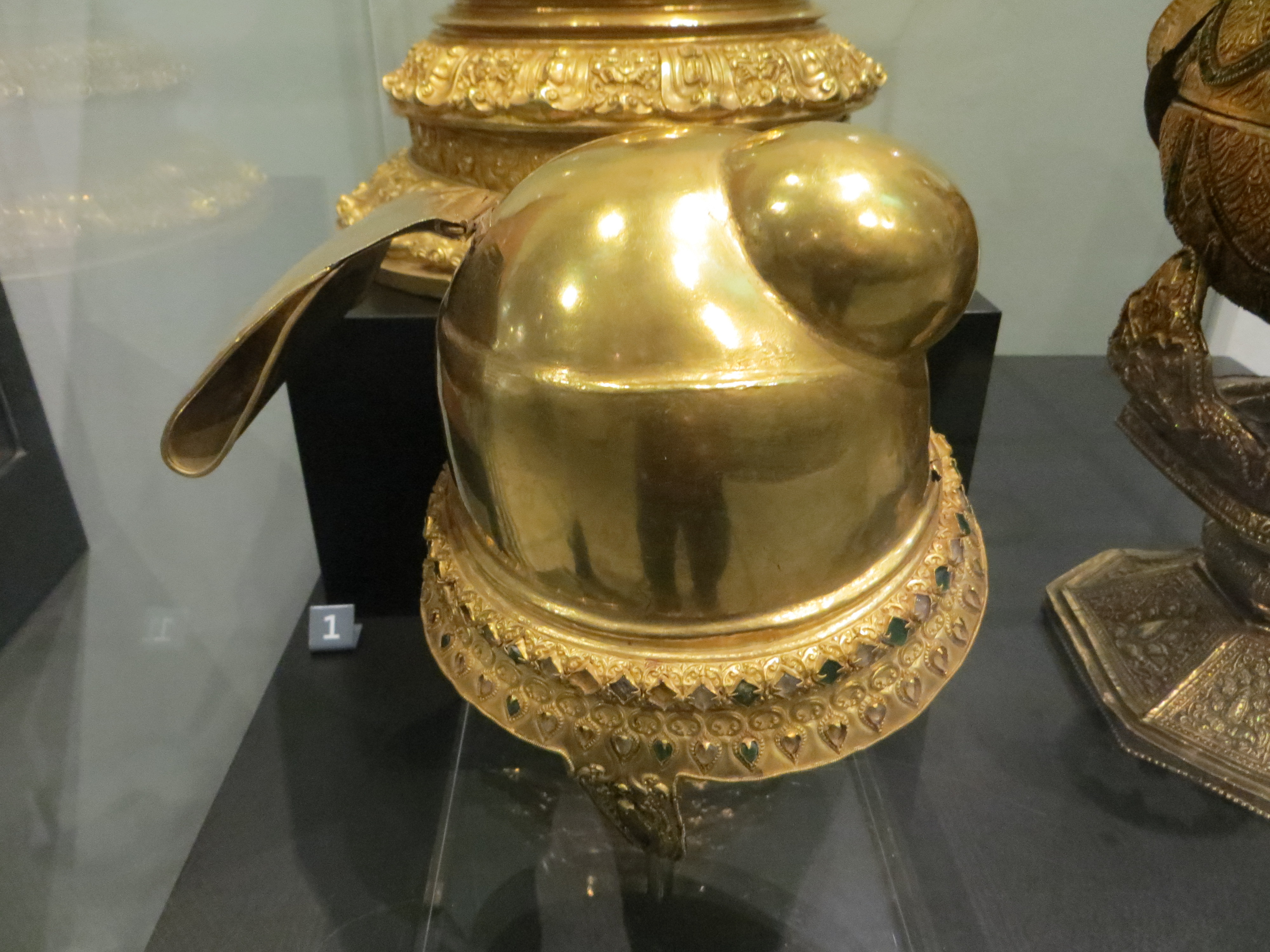
Ceremonial helmet conjecturally dated to the second half of Razadarit's reign (c. 1400–1420).

The stalemate ended with Binnya U's death on 2 January 1384. Maru tried to rally the court but found no support. When he and his wife tried to flee, they were captured. On 4 January 1384, (Note: (Pan Hla 2005: 356, footnote 1): Monday, 12th waxing of Tabodwe 745 ME = 4 January 1384) the Zeik-Bye-led court handed the power to Nwe, (who had turned 16 just four days earlier). (Note: He turned 16 (entered his 17th year) according to the Burmese calendar on the 8th waxing of Tabodwe 745 ME (31 December 1383). He was still 15 (24 days shy of 16), according to the Julian calendar, at his accession on 4 January 1384.) The next day, on 5 January, Nwe ascended the throne with the title of Razadarit (Pali: Rājādhirāj). The only blot was that his first wife Tala Mi Daw, who had just delivered their first (and only) son, refused to join him in the coronation ceremony. She had been deeply dissatisfied that he had not only left her in Pegu but also taken on more wives in Dagon. Nwe was undeterred; he went ahead with the ceremony with another wife, who became his chief consort with the title of Queen Piya Yaza Dewi.

== Early reign ==
=== Consolidation of power at Pegu ===
Razadarit's first actions were to consolidate power. He quickly dealt with those who could challenge him. He promptly had Maru executed. He initially accepted Ngan-Mohn's pledge of allegiance, but soon ordered his paternal half-brother imprisoned. (Ngan-Mohn would spend the next five years in prison before being finally executed.) Razadarit allowed his only maternal half-brother Nyi Kan-Kaung to remain as governor of Dala–Twante probably because Kan-Kaung was an early supporter of his rebellion, and he could not take Dala at the time in any case. (He seized Dala as soon as he was able in 1388/89, and had Kan-Kaung executed.) He was far less harsh with Maha Dewi; he allowed his adoptive mother to keep her post at Dagon albeit strictly in a ceremonial role.

"I pay court only to a king who wears a white umbrella, not to one who is without the emblem of kingship. If you should take umbrage... [at] this and have me executed, I lose nothing more than my life... but the underpinnings of good administration would be uprooted for good. People would point out my fate as an example of losing one's life and leaving one's wife destitute for being loyal only to a crowned king and omitting to make overtures like offering advice to a pretender who later becomes king. Such attitudes are... anathema to good administration and will destroy your peace of mind. The citizenry and ecclesiastics as well will suffer should such attitudes become prevalent in a country."

— Minister Dein's response to Razadarit as to why he should not be executed.

The court did not escape his ire either. He initially planned to punish court factions that did not support him. He was on the verge of ordering Minister Dein's execution when Dein famously pleaded that his only crime was being loyal to his father the king. Razadarit eventually concluded that he needed more than the Zeik-Bye faction of the court. He pardoned Dein, and accepted the pledge of allegiance by court officials.

=== Rebellious provinces ===
At his accession, Razadarit controlled only the Pegu–Dagon–Syriam–Dala corridor. No other vassals acknowledged him. It was not just the nominal vassals of his father like viceroys of Myaungmya and Martaban; even the late king's loyal vassals—most prominently, Viceroy Smin Sam Lek—refused to acknowledge the 16-year-old. For his part, Razadarit considered all of them in revolt although he could not yet take any action. In all, the Mon-speaking Lower Burma was divided into four key power centers:

Region	Ruler	Notes
Pegu	Razadarit	Most populous region; modern Yangon Region and southern Bago Region
Myaungmya (Irrawaddy delta)	Laukpya	Sparsely populated delta region to the west of Pegu; modern Ayeyarwady Region. Laukpya revolted in 1364 and became a nominal vassal of Binnya U c. 1371.
Donwun (northern Martaban province)	Smin Sam Lek	Modern northern Mon State and central Kayin State; Sam Lek was a loyal vassal of Binnya U
Martaban (southern Martaban province)	Byattaba	Former capital region of the kingdom; modern southern Mon State and southern Kayin State. Byattaba seized it in 1364 and became a nominal vassal of Binnya U c. 1371.

All was not lost for Razadarit. First, the region he controlled happened to be the most populous and most agriculturally productive region. In theory, he could raise more manpower than his rivals. Secondly, his rivals were not united. Sam Lek, who fought bitter battles against Byattaba in the 1360s, declared he would not side with anyone. Even Byattaba and Laukpya, who were full brothers and had forged a united front against Binnya U, were not in sync. Laukpya believed that peripheral provinces needed external support to keep a more populous Pegu at bay—in the same way the brothers used the backing of Lan Na (Chiang Mai) to carve out autonomy from Pegu in the early 1370s. This time, Laukpya wanted to seek the backing of the northern Ava Kingdom but Byattaba, whose territory bordered the Tai states to the east, demurred. A year into Razadarit's reign, none of his rivals had formed a united front.

== War with Ava and conquest of the provinces ==
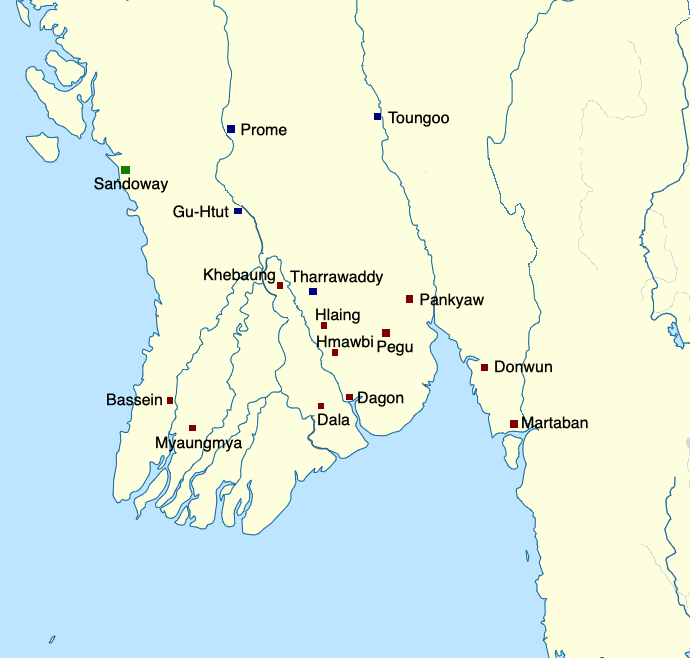
Key locations of the Ava–Hanthawaddy War (1385–1391)

The uneasy status quo did not last. In 1385, Laukpya on his own sought Ava's military assistance to oust Razadarit, offering to hold Pegu as a vassal state. The proposal resonated with the Ava court. By then, Ava had emerged as the main power in the Irrawaddy valley, with its king Swa Saw Ke intent on restoring the erstwhile Pagan Empire. Swa and his chief minister Min Yaza foresaw little difficulty in taking over Pegu. Swa accepted Laukpya's proposal. What followed was the Forty Years' War between Ava and Pegu.

=== Ava's initial invasions (1385–1387) ===
In December 1385, (Note: December 1385 per (Yazawin Thit Vol. 1 2012: 195–197), which says the invasion began in 747 ME, as Tarabya was about to turn 17 (enter his 18th year). But the standard chronicles (Maha Yazawin Vol. 1 2006: 290–293) and (Hmannan Vol. 1 2003: 417–420) say the invasion took place in 1386–87. But the chronicle Razadarit Ayedawbon (Pan Hla 2005: 164) suggests that the invasion took place in the dry season following Razadarit's accession, in 1384–85.) Swa sent down two armies (with a combined strength of 13,000 men, 1000 cavalry, 40 elephants), led by Swa's two young sons, Tarabya and Min Swe. Laukpya sent in a flotilla from the delta.

At Pegu, Razadarit scrambled to raise manpower. In desperation, he sent a last-minute mission to Donwun in search of levies but Sam Lek ignored the request. With limited troops available, the Pegu command had no choice but defend from inside its key fortified towns. Ava forces went on to occupy much of the Pegu province but they could not break through the key forts. Their only chance came five months into the invasion in May 1386 when Razadarit came out of Pegu to attack the Ava-occupied Fort Pankyaw. Ava forces quickly converged and nearly cornered Razadarit but Prince Min Swe's failure to follow orders allowed Razadarit to get back inside Pegu. Five days later, with the rainy season only weeks away, Ava forces withdrew.

Given their still tenuous position, Pegu sued for peace just two months later. Razadarit sent an embassy to Ava (Inwa) bearing lavish gifts to secure a peace treaty. In response, Laukpya hastily sent a delegation of his own to Ava to keep the alliance intact. At Ava, Swa and his court were grappling with twin problems: in addition to Pegu, their appointed ruler of Arakan had also been driven out of Launggyet. Swa was initially receptive to Pegu's offer. But after deliberating with his advisers for a month, he ultimately concluded that Pegu was still winnable outright, and an easier task than Arakan. Swa rejected Razadarit's proposal, and planned to lead the next invasion by himself.

Razadarit had assumed the worst, and was prepared. His plan was again to outlast the invaders from inside the walls. In late 1386, 29,000 Ava troops led by Swa and Tarabya invaded by the Irrawaddy and by land. Laukpya again joined the invasion with his flotilla. Yet, the invaders again could not break through the Hanthawaddy's defensive line at Dagon, Hlaing, Dala and Hmawbi, and had to retreat at the onset of the rainy season of 1387.

=== Conquest of provinces (1387–1390) ===
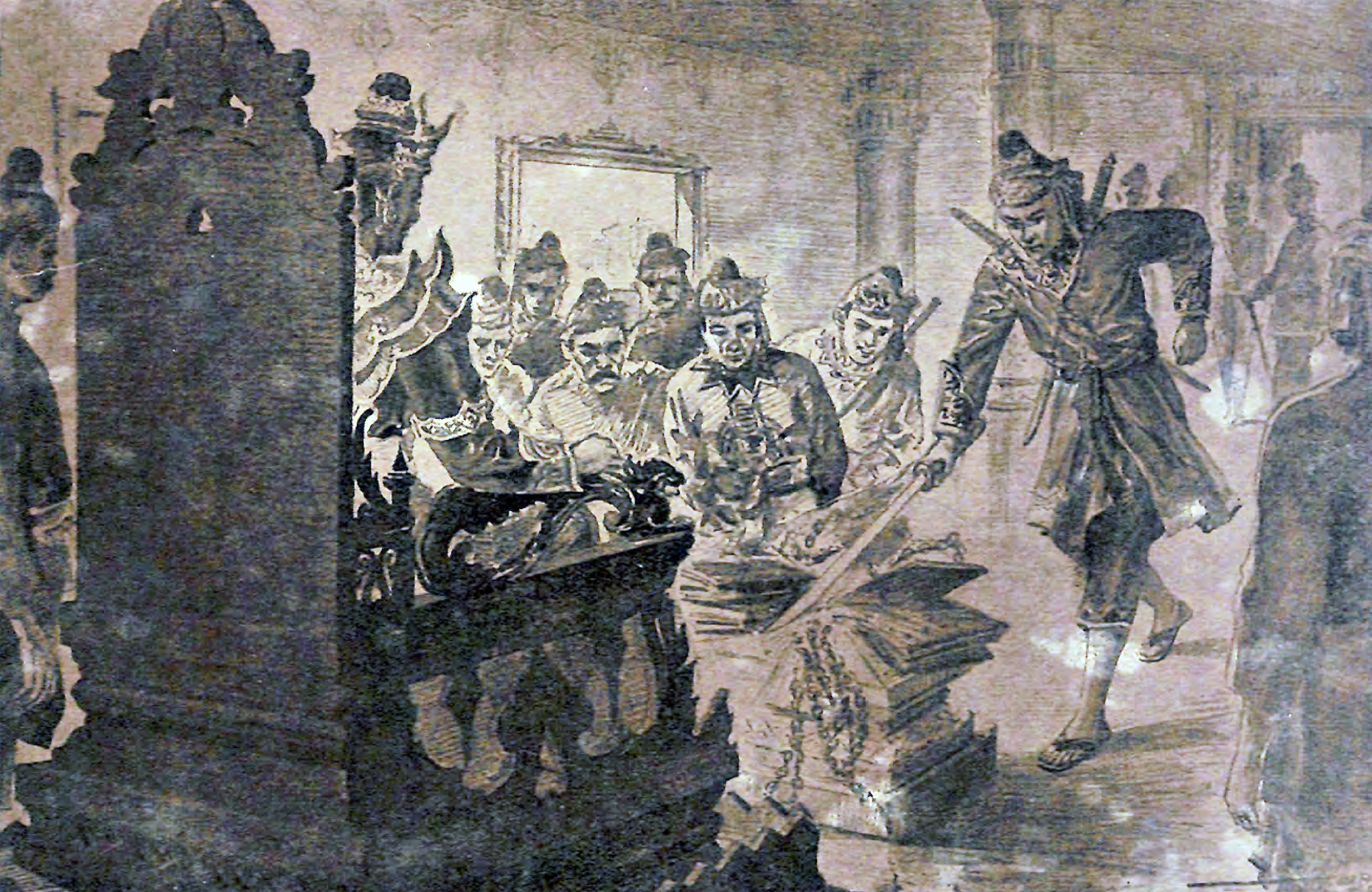
An illustration from Rachathirat, 1946 printed edition by an unknown Thai artist. After the battle of Myaungmya, Ma Pyit-Nwe, A son of Laukpya, gave his sword to King Razadarit before his execution. According to Rachathirat, a Thai version of Razadarit Ayedawbon, The king had ordered Lagun Ein to test his newly royal sword in front of him.

Despite the two successful stands, Razadarit remained isolated at home. None of the rebel rulers had come over. At the onset of the 1387–1388 dry season, Pegu was again prepared to face another Ava invasion on its own. But the expected invasion never came as Ava was forced to deal with breaches into its northern borders by the powerful Shan state of Maw (Mohnyin). It was the opening Razadarit and the court were looking for. Realizing that they needed to control as many resources as possible to fend off Ava in the long run, they set out to reunify the provinces. Over the next three years, while Ava was at war with Mohnyin, Razadarit successfully reunified his kingdom.

==== Donwun and Martaban ====
Razadarit's initial goal was modest, targeting just the northern Martaban province. For their part, the motley crew rebels there remained unimpressed by the Pegu army, untested outside the walls. The rebels actually put up a fight, forcing Pegu forces to storm town after town. But the Pegu army proved its worth; able commanders such as Than-Lan, Dein and Lagun Ein emerged. Over the next few months, larger forces of Pegu eventually captured the entire northern province, including Donwun, a strategic town 100 kilometres (62 mi) north of Martaban (Mottama), the former capital of the kingdom.

Buoyed by the initial success, Razadarit sent a 7000-strong army to probe Martaban's formidable defenses. His father could not retake Martaban in 1364–1371 but the outcome this time was to be different. Viceroy Byattaba of Martaban decided to come out of the city to ambush the Pegu army en route. The Pegu army was nearly defeated when the two rearguard regiments led by Than-Lan and Dein managed to drive out Byattaba from the battlefield. The army then raced to Martaban where the defenders quickly surrendered. The rest of the southern vassals also submitted. It was 1388 (or early 1389). (Note: The Razadarit Ayedawbon (Pan Hla 2005: 178) says that Razadarit conquered Martaban and Moulmein (Mawlamyaing) in 750 ME (29 March 1388 to 28 March 1389).) After the improbable victory, an overjoyed Razadarit appointed Than-Lan governor of Donwun with the princely title of Smin Byat Za.

==== Dala, Myaungmya and Bassein ====
Laukpya's Irrawaddy delta was next. But Razadarit first needed to deal with his half-brother Gov. Nyi Kan-Kaung of Dala–Twante, whose territory bordered the delta. He had received intelligence that Kan-Kaung had entered into a secret pact with Laukpya. After a period of clandestine preparations, Razadarit suddenly sacked Dala, and had Kan-Kaung executed. His path to the delta was now open.

"There are two aspects of war. One is to settle matters through diplomacy and the other through force of arms. In this affair, it was settled by negotiation, and they delivered the enemy per the agreement. Had we broken our word, and attacked them, we'd no longer have the option to settle matters through negotiation. We'd have to settle by force of arms only..."

— Minister–General Byat Za in response to Razadarit's question as to why he did not sack Sandoway in Arakan

In late 1389, Razadarit invaded the delta. Ava was still at war in the north, and could not send any help. Laukpya had to defend from inside the two heavily fortified port cities of Myaungmya and Bassein (Pathein). The strategy worked for awhile, holding off Razadarit's numerically superior forces for months. But as in Martaban, Laukpya's forces made what proved to be a crucial mistake of venturing out of Myaungmya. Laukpya's son and best commander Ma Pyit-Nwe was captured. A panicked Laukpya tried to flee the city but was also captured. Two days after Myaungmya's fall, Bassein also fell. Razadarit's forces went on to occupy the entire delta, including Ava's territory, Gu-Htut (modern Myan-Aung), in the northern delta, in 1390. His forces chased Lauk Shein, governor of Bassein, all the way to Sandoway (Thandwe) in Arakan, and laid siege to the city until Sandoway's ruler gave up Lauk Shein and his men. It was a total rout. Only Laukpya's son Bya Kun and son-in-law Bya Kyin escaped to Ava. Lauk Shein was executed at Razadarit's command.

To govern the province, Razadarit appointed Byat Za, who led the conquest of the delta, governor of Myaungmya, and Thilawa, a minister at the Pegu court, governor of Bassein.

=== Second coronation and the fallout (1390) ===
Razadarit had successfully reunified all three provinces of the Mon-speaking kingdom. In recognition of the momentous occasion, he held a second, much grander coronation ceremony in Pegu. He again had Piya Yaza Dewi by his side as the chief queen. This led to another round of bitter arguments between him and his first wife. He now took away Daw's family heirlooms—a dozen rings given by their father King Binnya U—and gave them to Piya Yaza Dewi. Bitter and heartbroken, Daw committed suicide.

"I do not plot against my father. Neither is there any fault in me. My father and mother played together as children. When she grew to womanhood, he took her beauty and then cast her away. She was a king's daughter, but he used her like a slavewoman and drove her to an evil death...
... If I am guilty of treason by thought, word or deed, may I suffer in the fires of the nether regions for a thousand cycle times. If I am innocent, may I be reborn in the dynasty of Ava kings, and may I become the scourge of my father."

— Oath attributed to Prince Baw Law Kyan Daw

It was not all. Razadarit also ordered their only child Baw Law Kyan Daw executed. As recounted by the chronicle Razadarit Ayedawbon, he reasoned that as he himself revolted against his father, his son would certainly avenge his mother when he grew up. According to legend, the child before his death proclaimed his innocence, and famously swore to be reborn as a prince of Ava and fight his father. Razadarit was greatly disturbed when he heard of the terrible oath. (In the superstitious world of Burmese politics, he was alarmed when the wife of Prince Min Swe of Ava gave birth to a son about a year later.)

=== Third Ava invasion (1390–1391) ===
Despite the grandiose coronation, Razadarit was not yet out of danger. His victory in the delta had come just as Ava reached a truce with Mohnyin. (In a marriage of state, Princess Shin Mi-Nauk, daughter of King Tho Ngan Bwa of Mohnyin, was wedded to Prince Min Swe, son of King Swa of Ava. The couple would have their first son, who according to legend, was Baw Law Kyan Daw reincarnated.) King Swa Saw Ke now turned his attention to the south; Pegu's occupation of Gu-Htut must be responded to.

In late 1390, Swa launched another two-pronged invasion, again by the Irrawaddy and land. Just as in the second invasion, Swa himself led the 17,000-strong river-borne invasion forces and Crown Prince Tarabya led the 12,000-strong army by the Toungoo route. But unlike with the previous invasions, Ava forces faced far more numerous southern forces, who fiercely defended the border. The Hanthawaddy navy held off repeated charges by the larger Ava navy near Gu-Htut. Likewise, the Hanthawaddy army at Fort Pankyaw stopped the Ava army. Despite the military success, the Pegu court (Note: Razadarit Ayedawbon (Pan Hla 2005: 197–200) says that the initial peace proposal was made by Maha Thamun, one of the four most senior ministers, and that the other three senior ministers of the Pegu court agreed, and persuaded Razadarit to end the war. (The other three ministers were not explicitly named in the sentence, but they would have been Byat Za, Dein and Zeik-Bye as mentioned in earlier parts of the chronicle.)) persuaded their king to return Gu-Htut to Ava in exchange for Ava's recognition. Faced with yet another embarrassing failure, Swa accepted the face-saving proposal. In early 1391, Razadarit and Swa agreed to a peace treaty that allowed Pegu to consolidate most of its gains.

The peace almost broke down the following dry season. In late 1391, Ava posted an army in Tharrawaddy (Thayawadi), its southernmost territory. In response, Pegu sent a sizable force to the border in a show of force. The fragile peace held.

== Height of power ==
=== External relations ===
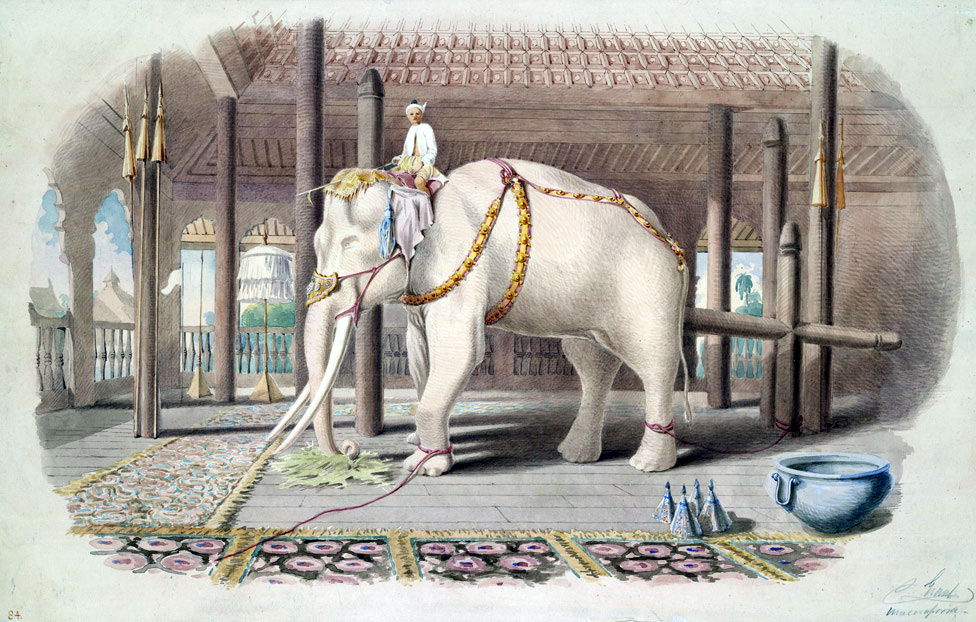
A white elephant at the Amarapura Palace in 1855

Razadarit had now emerged as a bona fide power, and was recognized as such. Ayutthaya (Siam), which in the past had claimed as far north as Martaban, offered recognition on equal terms. King Ramesuan even sent a white elephant, a symbol of Southeast Asian monarchs, and a letter acknowledging Razadarit as being of the same race as himself. A delighted Razadarit sent an embassy led by chief ministers Byat Za and Dein Mani-Yut to receive the elephant at Kamphaeng Phet.

Chronicles do not say whether Lan Na and Arakan also offered recognition but they posed no threat to Pegu in any case. (He did raise three sisters, who were descended from a prominent aristocratic family of Chiang Mai, as his principal queens—one of them, Yaza Dewi, as his new chief queen consort, replacing Queen Piya Yaza Dewi who had just died. But it is not clear if the marriages had additional political significance. As for Arakan, the western kingdom had just escaped Ava's orbit in 1385/86, and was to be in chaos until Ava's reoccupation in 1406.) In all, Ava, the only power that could threaten Pegu, was preoccupied by renewed hostilities with Mohnyin in the 1390s, and left Pegu alone.

=== Domestic affairs ===
On the domestic front, Razadarit faced no challenges. His administration consisted mainly of ministers from his father's court led by Dein Mani-Yut, Byat Za, Zeik-Bye and Maha Thamun. With their help, he instituted a more cohesive administrative system across the newly unified kingdom. Some colonial period scholars conjectured that he introduced the 32-district per province system but the extant evidence does not support such a claim. (Note: (Shorto 2002: 186): Colonial period historians—Shorto cited Harvey, Furnivall, Hall—attributed the 32-district system to Razadarit without evidence. Shorto's 1963 paper shows that the earliest extant evidence of the 32-district system dates only to the 17th century—a 1650 stone inscription at the Kaunghmudaw Pagoda in Sagaing.)

The administrative reforms, combined with peaceful conditions, transformed the kingdom into a major power. By 1400, Hanthawaddy was in full flight. So confident was Razadarit of his kingdom's strengths that he seriously contemplated conquering Ava when the northern kingdom was in a succession crisis in 1400.

== Invasion of Ava ==
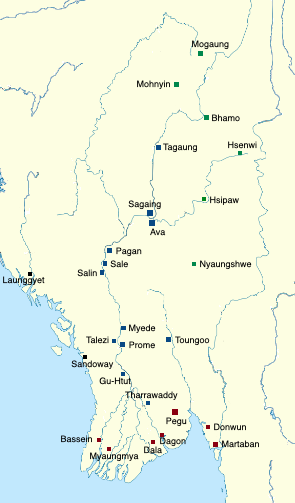
Hanthawaddy forces attacked Ava territories from Tharrawaddy to Tagaung in 1401–1402, and up to Prome in 1402–1403

=== Casus belli ===
What tempted Razadarit was the chaotic interregnum in late 1400 following King Tarabya's assassination. (King Swa Saw Ke died in April 1400.) Two powerful governors—Tarabya's assassin Gov. Thihapate of Tagaung and Gov. Maha Pyauk of Yamethin, who commanded a sizeable army—vied to seize power while the rightful successor Prince Min Swe was too concerned to claim the throne. It was only through the efforts of Swe's younger brother Theiddat and the court led by Min Yaza that Swe ascended the throne with the title of Minkhaung, on 25 November 1400.

For Razadarit, it was time for payback. He reasoned that Minkhaung was weak, and that he could quickly invade Ava and make it a vassal state. Given that Ava was far larger and more populous than Pegu, Co-chief Minister Dein urged limiting the invasion to Prome. But the king would hear nothing less than conquering the capital Ava (Inwa), and the court ultimately agreed to a full scale invasion. By November 1401, they had collected a 1300-boat river-borne invasion fleet that would transport 5000 (or 7000) troops, horses and elephants upriver to Ava; and a 3000-man army that would attack Prome.

=== Invasion ===
The invasion began on 15 November 1401. (Note: The chronicle Razadarit Ayedawbon (Pan Hla 2005: 205) says the invasion began on Tuesday, 15th waxing of Nadaw 756 ME [sic!] (Monday, 7 December 1394). The date contains two typographical errors. First, the 756 ME is clearly an error; the chronicle itself on the previous page (p. 204) states that the Pegu command began planning for the invasion in 763 ME (29 March 1401 to 29 March 1402). Second, it is highly unusual (and technically incorrect) to say 15th waxing instead of the full moon day. Most Burmese numerals can easily be miscopied as another numeral; in this case, the date could be 10th, 11th or 12th waxing since the Burmese numerals ၀ (0), ၁ (1) or ၂ (2) can be miscopied as ၅ (5). Because the invasion date was on a Tuesday, the date is most probably Tuesday, 10th waxing of Nadaw 763 ME (Tuesday, 15 November 1401).) The plan was to score a quick victory at Ava and force a surrender. Initially, the Pegu navy faced little opposition as Ava was caught flatfooted, and its forces had to stay inside the fortified towns along the river. The Pegu navy quickly took complete control of the Irrawaddy as far north as Tagaung.

Then the invasion sputtered. Pegu forces occupied Sagaing across from Ava but as Dein had feared, the naval blockades alone were not enough to force Minkhaung to surrender. The size of the invasion force (no more than 7000 troops in the northern theater) was simply too small to storm or lay siege to Ava or any nearby fortified cities. (Note: Ava sent 29,000 men each in its 1386–87 and 1390–91 campaigns, and still could not overcome Hanthawaddy defenses.) A stalemate ensued. Minkhaung tried to buy time by sending a prominent monk to broker a truce. Razadarit stubbornly continued the blockade before finally withdrawing at the start of the rainy season. On the southern front, the army also withdrew but Prome's counterattack captured Razadarit's daughter Tala Mi Kyaw, accompanying her husband Gen. Saw Maha-Rit. Razadarit had Maha-Rit executed for fleeing and losing his daughter.

=== Ava's counterattack ===
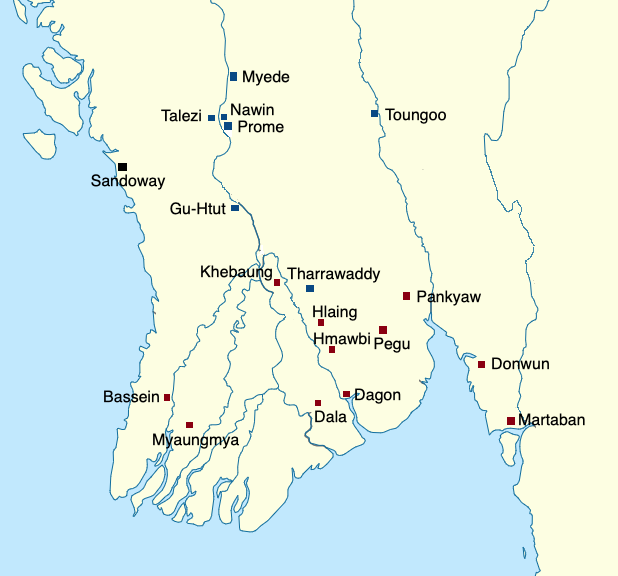
Hanthawaddy forces laid siege to Prome in 1402

Razadarit had not completely given up. He had abandoned turning Ava into a vassal state but still believed that he could extract territory. Right after the rainy season, he sent in 7000-strong land and naval forces to attack Prome and Gu-Htut. But Pegu's opportunity had passed on by. Minkhaung had now gained the support of his vassals, and was now able to respond militarily. The king of Ava initially sent down a 5000-strong army, and about a month later in December, a much larger force (12,000 troops, 700 horses and 30 elephants) to the front.

The Pegu high command was split. Byat Za and Dein advised their king to withdraw immediately and prepare for the defense of the homeland. But the Zeik-Bye faction underestimated the Ava relief force, and urged Razadarit to press on. Razadarit sided with Zeik-Bye. Larger Ava forces not only broke the siege but also sacked the main Pegu forward base at Nawin, near Prome, on 26 December 1402. (Note: (Yazawin Thit Vol. 1 2012: 220): Tuesday, 3rd waxing of Tabodwe 764 ME = 26 December 1402.) All three regiments defending the garrison were lost; Zeik-Bye himself was captured. The Pegu command feared an imminent invasion. The only saving grace was that their navy had been successful in disrupting Ava's river-borne supply lines, greatly slowing down the advance of Ava troops. Razadarit finally agreed to ask for a truce. The Ava command was not yet ready to press on, and agreed to negotiate.

== Temporary truce ==
=== Treaties of Prome and Kawliya (1403) ===
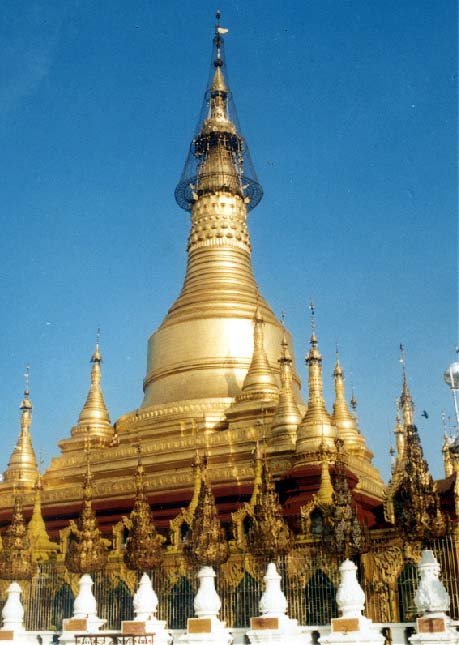
The Shwesandaw Pagoda in Prome (Pyay) where Razadarit and Minkhaung swore to uphold the treaty in 1403

The peace negotiations began c. 5 January 1403. The two sides soon reached agreement on the immediate issues of returning to the prewar border and the exchange of prisoners. However, Hanthawaddy's insistence on longer term security guarantees remained a sticking point. Both sides agreed to have the kings sign off on the initial agreed-upon points, and continue hold further discussions on the pending issues afterwards. Circa February/March 1403, the two kings met at the Shwesandaw Pagoda in Prome, and agreed to return to the prewar border, with explicitly stated demarcation points.

The next round of negotiations were held at Kawliya, a small town outside Pegu. The Ava delegation was led by Chief Minister Min Yaza while Byat Za and Dein led the Hanthawaddy side. An agreement was reached to ensure peace for the long run. Minkhaung agreed to a marriage of state between Razadarit and his younger sister Princess Thupaba Dewi. In return, Razadarit sanctioned Princess Tala Mi Kyaw's status as a queen of Minkhaung; he also agreed to grant Ava the annual customs revenue of the port of Bassein, and 30 war elephants—annually.

=== Resurgent Ava ===
The marriage alliance was of little consolation to Razadarit. The invasion had completely backfired. Not only had he not gained any territory, but he now had to deal with a far stronger and ambitious Minkhaung. In the next three years, Minkhaung went on an acquisition spree of Ava's neighboring cis-Salween Shan states: Onbaung (1404/05), Nyaungshwe (1405/06) and Mohnyin (1406). (Note: Chronicles (Yazawin Thit Vol. 1 2012: 224–225) and (Hmannan Vol. 1 2003: 445–446, 467) say that Nyaungshwe and Mohnyin submitted in 767 ME (1405/06) and 768 ME (1406/07) respectively. (Fernquest Autumn 2006: 51): According to Ming records, Ava had acquired Bhamo, Mohnyin, and Kalay by 25 August 1406.)

The acquisitions greatly alarmed Ava's neighbors. The Ming court, which considered the Shan states its tributaries, sent an embassy on 25 August 1406 to Ava to end the "aggression" at once. For Pegu, the urgency was much higher. The Pegu court received intelligence that Ava was planning to invade Arakan, and that Pegu would be next. Then in November 1406, Ava forces led by Minkhaung's 15-year-old son Minye Kyawswa conquered Arakan.

=== Preparation for war ===
Ava's conquest of Arakan confirmed Pegu's suspicions. Razadarit ordered his court to prepare for war, and removed any veneers of friendly relations. He readily gave shelter to the Arakanese prince Min Khayi (or King Min Saw Mon). (Note: The chronicle Razadarit Ayedawbon (Pan Hla 2005: 239) says Razadarit took in Min Saw Mon but the Arakanese Rakhine Razawin Thit chronicle (Sandamala Linkara Vol. 2 1999: 9) says it was Khayi, the brother of Min Saw Mon, that fled to Hanthawaddy; Min Saw Mon fled to Bengal.) In 1407, he warmly welcomed Minkhaung's brother Theiddat, who defected to Pegu after being passed over for crown prince. He now scrapped the 1403 treaty; he stopped sending the annual shipment of elephants and customs revenue of the port of Bassein. The Pegu command fully expected an invasion by Ava at the start of the dry season. Even when it did not come—Minkhaung was suppressing a rebellion in the Shan state of Bhamo in the north—Pegu remained fully mobilized as it believed the invasion could still come after Bhamo.

== Renewal of war ==
In 1408, Razadarit decided to attack first. The decision would plunge Pegu and Ava into the fiercest battles of the Forty Years' War in the following years, and bring Pegu to the brink of defeat.

=== Pegu's invasion of Arakan (1408) ===
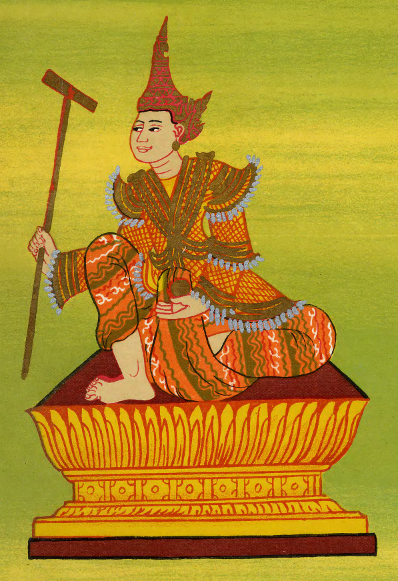
King Anawrahta of Launggyet portrayed as the Shwe Nawrahta nat

The decision was not made lightly. Razadarit and his advisers concluded that they should attack while Ava still had its hands full in the north, rather than wait for the full force of Ava to come down. Their target was Arakan. They believed that the Ava-installed king Anawrahta, who was married to Minkhaung's daughter Saw Pyei Chantha, had no real support while they had a legitimate claimant. A Hanthawaddy army easily took Launggyet in March/April 1408, (Note: Chronicles report slightly different dates for Pegu's takeover of Launggyet. (Maha Yazawin Vol. 1 2006: 334) says Pegu forces had taken Arakan by Kason 770 ME (29 March 1408 to 23 April 1408); (Yazawin Thit Vol. 1 2012: 228) gives Late Tagu 969 ME (25 February 1408 to 24 March 1408); (Hmannan Vol. 1 2003: 477) gives Late Kason 769 ME (25 to 28 March 1408).) and brought back Anawrahta and Pyei Chantha as captives. Razadarit had Anawrahta executed, and raised Pyei Chantha as his queen.

It was a provocative move, and it worked. Minkhaung was especially furious that Razadarit raised his daughter, outside of the norms of the day. (Note: (Yazawin Thit Vol. 1 2012: 230 footnote 1 by editors): It was customary for victorious monarchs of the day not to raise daughters of the defeated monarchs as their queens but rather to wed them to their sons or nephews.) Although the rainy season was just a month away, the king ordered an immediate invasion of the south, overruling his ministers' suggestion to wait until the dry season.

=== Minkhaung's reprisals (1408–1410) ===
In May 1408, Minkhaung led two armies (26,000 men, 2200 horses, 100 elephants), and invaded the southern country. As predicted, Ava forces soon got bogged down in the swamps of Lower Burma. Three months into the campaign, Ava forces were running out of supplies due to the rainy season weather as well as Peguan ambushes on supply lines. Razadarit ordered three attempts on Minkhaung's life. (Note: (Hmannan Vol. 1 2003: 480–482): The first attempt was to lure Minkhaung to the negotiating table, and murder him there; the plan was revealed to the Ava side by Commander Lagun Ein who disapproved of the tactic of his king. The second attempt was to ambush Minkhaung near the Ava camp; it failed because Theiddat, who at the last minute had a change of heart and warned his estranged brother. Theiddat was executed. The third attempt was by Lagun Ein who led a team of commandos and successfully infiltrated the Ava camp. Minkhaung barely escaped.) When the attempts failed, Razadarit personally led the counterattack, forcing Ava armies to withdraw in complete disarray. Queen Mi-Nauk was captured. In another provocative move, he immediately raised her as his queen.

Minkhaung was in no position to respond to the provocation. His forces had been badly depleted. When Ava forces did not return at the start of the dry season, Razadarit ordered an attack on Prome on 22 November 1408. (Note: (Pan Hla 2005: 278): 5th waxing of Nadaw 770 ME = 22 November 1408) But the attack faltered. Minkhaung did return in the following dry season, but his armies again could not break through. Five months into the invasion, c. May 1410, Razadarit counterattacked. Near Tharrawaddy, the two kings faced on their respective war elephants, and Razadarit drove back Minkhaung. After Minkhaung fled the scene, the remaining Ava army was routed; several infantry, cavalry and elephants were captured.

=== Minye Kyawswa's invasions (1410–1415) ===
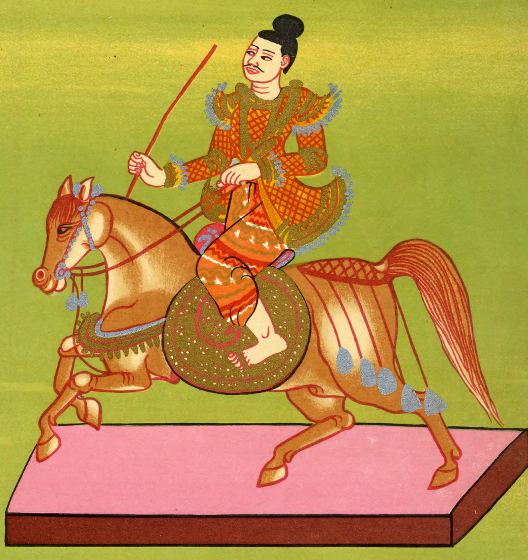
Minye Kyawswa represented as the Min Kyawzwa nat

Pegu was far from out of danger, however. Razadarit would face a reinvigorated Ava military in the next five years under the leadership of Crown Prince Minye Kyawswa, who took over as commander-in-chief in 1410. The crown prince was eager to take on Razadarit who held both his mother and sister in his harem. Minye Kyawswa would come close to defeating Pegu. Razadarit would be forced to seek alliances with Hswenwi and Ming China to outlast determined Ava attacks.

==== Irrawaddy delta and Arakan (1410–1411) ====
Minye Kyawswa brought a fresh thinking to Ava's battle plan. Instead of directly attacking the well-defended Pegu capital region, he would attack what he believed were less defended regions. In late 1410, he invaded the delta by river and land with 14,000 troops. But he soon found the key delta ports Myaungmya and Bassein (Pathein) well fortified, and had to pull back to Prome. From Prome, he then invaded Arakan in early 1411, and successfully drove out Pegu-installed vassals.

==== Alliance with Hsenwi and retaking of Arakan (1411–1412) ====
The Pegu command's strategy was to have Ava fight a multi-front war. Razadarit sought and secured an alliance with the Shan state of Hsenwi. It was a natural alliance. The powerful Shan state had been ordered by its overlord Ming China to retaliate against Ava's annexations of cis-Salween Shan states. China also sent an embassy to recognize Razadarit as her "governor" of Pegu. The allies now planned to attack Ava from both sides. In late 1411, Razadarit sent two armies to Arakan. The Pegu armies defeated the Ava garrison at Sandoway (Thandwe) before Ava reinforcements led by Minye Kyawswa arrived. Ava forces laid siege to the city for the next three months. Then, Hsenwi opened the northern front, forcing Minkhaung to recall Minye Kyawswa. After Minye Kyawswa left, reinforced Hanthawaddy troops went on to drive out the Ava garrison at Launggyet by March 1412. (Ava retained a toehold at the Khway-thin-taung garrison in northern Arakan until 1416/17 but it did not send a force to retake Arakan.)

==== Siege of Prome and defense of Lower Burma (1412–1413) ====
Razadarit had regained Arakan but his ally was in trouble. Minye Kyawswa had not only decisively defeated the invading Hsenwi army but gone on to lay siege to the city of Hsenwi itself by May 1412. The Yunnan government sent a large army (20,000 men and 2000 cavalry) but the army was driven back with heavy losses by Minye Kyawswa. In November, as Hsenwi was running out of provisions, Razadarit reopened the southern front with a massive attack on Prome. It worked. The attack was serious enough that Minkhaung himself marched to relieve Prome, and ordered Minye Kyawswa to join him at Prome.

But Razadarit had to worry about his own rear. A month into the siege, he had to hastily marched down to Martaban because a Siamese army led by Lord of Kamphaeng Phet was raiding Ye. The remaining Pegu forces, led by Prince Binnya Bassein fought off Ava's attempts to break the siege for the next four months. But after the sudden deaths of his two most senior commanders: Byat Za (natural causes) and Lagun Ein (KIA), Razadarit ordered a withdrawal. Minye Kyawswa chased the retreating troops, taking Dala–Twante and Dagon before the fighting paused for the rainy season.

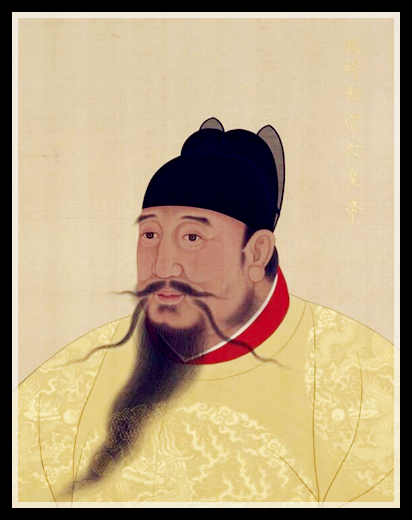
The Yongle Emperor

Razadarit immediately sent an embassy carrying 7 viss (11.43 kg) of gold to Hsenwi (via Chiang Mai) to make sure that the Shan state open the northern front after the rainy season. His calls were answered. The Yongle Emperor ordered another attack on Ava. During the rainy season, Chinese-backed Hsenwi forces raided Ava's northern territories, destroying "over 20 cities and stockades", and taking back elephants, horses, and other goods (which were presented at the Chinese capital in September 1413). Minkhaung recalled Minye Kyawswa to face the Chinese, and sent his younger son Thihathu to Prome to take over the southern command. Minye Kyawswa defeated the enemy at Myedu, and chased them to the Chinese border.

==== Minye Kyawswa's last campaign (1414–1415) ====
Razadarit did not open the southern front in the 1413–1414 dry season. He decided to save his forces for the likely Ava invasion in the following dry season. As expected, in October 1414, Minye Kyawswa backed by a large army (8000 men, 200 horses and 80 elephants), and a navy (13,000 men, and over 1800 ships of all sizes) again invaded the delta. Although Hanthawaddy forces put up a spirited defense, Ava forces had gained complete control of the delta by the end of December. Razadarit evacuated Pegu, and moved to Martaban as the Ava command planned a pincer movement on Pegu from Toungoo and from Dala.

But the planned attack was postponed as a Chinese army invaded Ava. The Chinese invasion provided a much-needed breathing room for Pegu. Razadarit was back in Pegu by January/February 1415, planning a counterattack. (Note: (Yazawin Thit Vol. 1 2012: 253): Tabodwe 776 ME = 10 January 1415 to 7 February 1415) On 2 March 1415, Razadarit himself led the army to the Dala front. (Note: (Yazawin Thit Vol. 1 2012: 256): 8th waning of Tabaung 776 ME = 2 March 1415) On 13 March 1415, the two armies fought at Dala–Twante one of the most famous battles in Burmese military history. Minye Kyawswa was mortally wounded in the battle. Razadarit gave the fallen prince an honorable burial. Minkhaung immediately came down with an army, and exhumed his son's body. The remains were solemnly dropped into the waters near Twante. After rampaging through the delta, Minkhaung called off the invasion and left.

=== Last campaigns (1416–1418) ===
The war petered out afterwards. In the following dry season, Razadarit sent his eldest son Prince Binnya Dhammaraza to attack Toungoo (Taungoo). But the army was driven back by Thihathu. Thihathu's retaliatory invasion in 1417–1418 went on to take Dagon, forcing Razadarit to retreat to Martaban. But Ava forces could not advance towards Pegu, and withdrew. They did take back Razadarit's son Gov. Binnya Set of Dagon to Ava where he was given good treatment befitting a prince.

Minkhaung called off any additional campaigns. Razadarit too decided not to test Ava. Unofficial peace between the two kingdoms would hold the remainder of Minkhaung's and Razadarit's reigns. The peace held even after Minkhaung died c. October 1421. When the court asked Razadarit if he wished to renew the war, and he refused. Instead, he mourned Minkhaung's death by saying that he had lost his royal younger brother. (Note: All the earlier chronicles from Razadarit Ayedawbon (c. 1560s) to Hmannan Yazawin (1832) say that Minkhaung died first, and Razadarit mourned Minkhaung's death. The Pak Lat Chronicles, compiled in 1910–1912 (Pan Hla 2005: 361), says the opposite that Razadarit died first, and Minkhaung was the one that mourned Razadarit's death. But the Pak Lat story is likely false as all other chronicles say Ava did invade Pegu once Razadarit died, resulting in Princess Shin Saw Pu being sent to Ava.)

== Death and succession ==
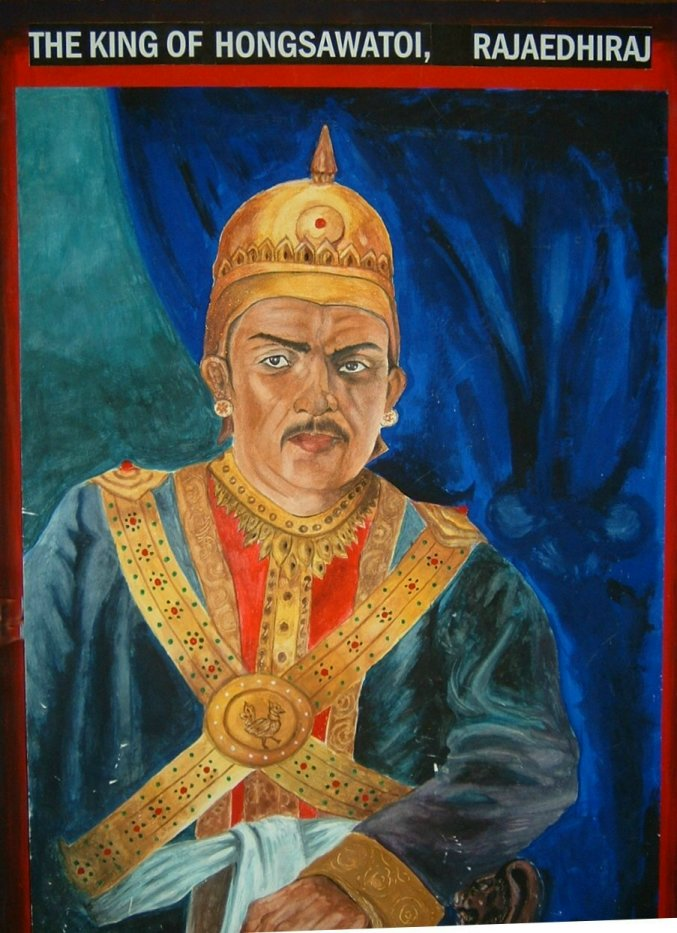
A painting representing King Razadarit

Just two months after Minkhaung's death, c. December 1421, (Note: According to the Razadarit Ayedawbon chronicle (Pan Hla 2005: 356), Razadarit died in his 54th year (at age 53), having reigned for about 38 years. This means he must have died before his 54th birthday on the 8th waxing of Tabodwe 783 ME (30 December 1421). As per (Yazawin Thit Vol. 1 2012: 264–265), Minkhaung died in his 49th year (at age 48), and Razadarit died about two months after Minkhaung. This means Razadarit died about two months after Minkhaung's 48th birthday on the 12th waning of Thadingyut 783 ME (22 September 1421) and the day before his 54th birthday (29 December 1421). That is, he probably died c. December 1421.) Razadarit suddenly died from a hunting accident. He had been catching elephants at the foot of the Pegu Yoma Hills north of Pegu before getting his leg caught in the rope, and receiving mortal injuries. He died on the way home at Kama Thamein Paik (near modern Payagyi). He was cremated there, and the remains were brought to Pegu where they were interred within a wooden stockade, reminiscent of ancient Pyu practices. He was 53 (in his 54th year).

In addition to the title Razadarit/Yazadarit (Pali: Rājādhirāj; "King of Kings"), the king was also known as Thiha Yaza (Pali: Siharājā; "Lion King"), and as Thutathawma Yazadarit, (Sutasoma Rājādhirāj). (Note: (Pan Hla 2005: 368): He is referred to as Thutathawma Yazadarit (Sutasoma Rājādhirāj) at the Shwedagon Pagoda inscription. (Stadtner 2015: 72): Sutasoma is the main character from the Mahāsutasoma Jātaka).)

Because Razadarit did not have a formal succession plan, his three sons contested for the throne. The eldest son Binnya Dhammaraza was crowned king by the court but his two younger half-brothers Binnya Ran and Binnya Kyan did not acknowledge him. Ava invaded twice in the next two dry seasons before reaching a peace deal with Binnya Ran in 1423. The succession crisis at Pegu would end only after Binnya Ran's accession in 1424.

== Administration ==
Razadarit instituted a more uniform administrative system across the kingdom. He kept the three province system, and reorganized the districts within each province. According to the Razadarit Ayedawbon chronicle, compiled in the 1560s, Martaban had 30 districts, Pegu 30 districts and Bassein 17 districts. After defending against Ava's first wave of invasions, he invested much political capital in integrating the region's main centers of power: Martaban, Moulmein, Bassein and Myaungmya.

The following is a list of rulers of the key districts.

Province	District	Appointee (duration in office)	Notes
Martaban	Martaban (Mottama)	Byat Ka-Man (1388–?)	
Martaban	Donwun	Byat Za (1388–1390)	
Martaban	Moulmein (Mawlamyaing)	Sithu (1388–1392)	
Hanthawaddy Pegu	Syriam (Thanlyin)	Dein Mani-Yut (1384–1408); Smin Maw-Khwin (1408–1414); Binnya Ran (1414–1424)	
Hanthawaddy Pegu	Dagon	Maha Dewi (1384–1392); Binnya Set (1415–1418)	
Hanthawaddy Pegu	Dala (Dala, Twante)	Nyi Kan-Kaung (1370/71–1388/89); Baw Kyaw (1388/89–1402); Binnya Dala (1414–1422)	
Hanthawaddy Pegu	Sittaung	Zeik-Bye (1384–1415); Dein Mani-Yut (1415–1421)	
Bassein	Myaungmya	Byat Za (1390–1413); Smin Sam Lek (1415–?)	Titular provincial governorship may have been held by Prince Binnya Bassein ("Lord of Bassein") by 1412 (Note: The Razadarit Ayedawbon chronicle (Pan Hla 2005: 277) refers to one of the king's sons as Binnya Bassein (lit. "Lord of Bassein") in 1412 although the chronicle (Pan Hla 2005: 283–284) also says Dein Mani-Yut, appointed governor of Bassein in 1408, was in Bassein in 1413 organizing an attack on Prome. Moreover, the Yazawin Thit chronicle (Yazawin Thit Vol. 1 2012: 262) names Dein governor of Bassein until 1415. It probably means Binnya Bassein was a titular lord of Bassein.)
Bassein	Bassein (Pathein)	Thilawa (1390–1408); Dein Mani-Yut (1408–1415); Smin Awa Naing Min Thiri (1415–1421)	Titular provincial governorship may have been held by Prince Binnya Bassein ("Lord of Bassein") by 1412

== Legacy ==
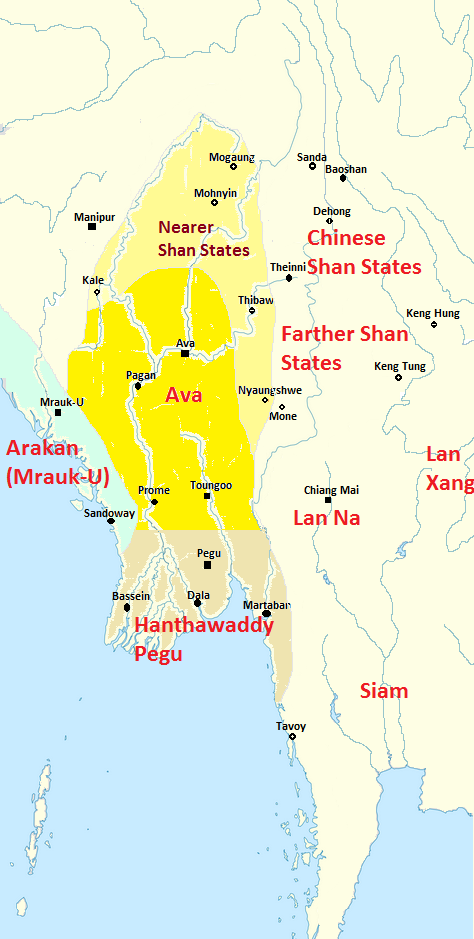
Approximate political map of Burma c. 1450

Razadarit is one of the most famous kings in Burmese history. He, along with King Dhammazedi (r. 1471–1492), is considered one of the two most important kings of the Martaban–Hanthawaddy dynasty. His main achievements were unifying much of Lower Burma for the first time, and defending the territorial integrity of his unified kingdom from Ava's attacks, earning him the moniker "Yazadarit the Unifier".

But his unification was not just due to his much chronicled military skills alone. He invested much energy on integrating hitherto factious centers of power—in particular, Martaban, Moulmein, Bassein and Myaungmya—into a more centralized administration, which on balance were generally successful. Aung-Thwin writes: "it took incredible discipline, military skill and political will to do it [unify the kingdom], leaving his successors, particularly Shin Saw Bu and Dhammazedi, with a kingdom that was far less fractious, reasonably well integrated and wealthy." Without him, "the dynasty probably would not have survived much beyond Binnya U."

He was certainly held in high regard by his successors. Three of his children—Binnya Dhammaraza (r. 1421–1424), Binnya Ran I (r. 1424–1446) and Shin Saw Pu (r. 1454–1471) became monarchs of Hanthawaddy Pegu. His title Razadarit/Yazadarit (Pali: Rājādhirāj; "King of Kings") was adopted by several kings of the dynasty. (Note: (Pan Hla 2005: 368): Binnya Ran I's title was Yama Yazadarit; Binnya Waru's was Zayeidditha Yazadarit; Binnya Kyan: Dhamma Zetyalawkyanahta Yazadarit; Dhammazedi: Yama Dipadi Giparama Maha Dhamma Yazadirit)

The king's story is recorded in a classic epic called Razadarit Ayedawbon that exists in Burmese Mon and Thai language forms. Razadarit's struggles against Minkhaung I and Minye Kyawswa of Ava are part of classic stories of legend in Burmese culture to the present day.

== Family ==
=== Ancestry ===
From his father's side, Razadarit was descended from kings of Martaban; he was a great-grandson of King Hkun Law and a great-grandnephew of Wareru, founder of the dynasty. His maternal side hailed from a line of court ministers, ultimately from Senior Minister Bo Htu-Hpyet, who served at the court of Wareru.

Ancestry of King Razadarit

8. Min Bala of Myaungmya
4. Saw Zein
9. Hnin U Yaing
2. Binnya U
10. Hkun Law
5. Sanda Min Hla
11. unnamed
1. Binnya Nwe
12. Bo Htu-Hpyet
6. Than-Bon
13. unnamed
3. Thiri Maya Dewi
7. unnamed

=== Siblings ===
He had three maternal half-siblings, and at least three paternal half-siblings.

Name	Type	Notes
Tala Mi Thiri	Paternal half-sister	Queen of Chiang Mai (c. 1365 – c. 1371); Wife of Smim Maru (c. 1372 – 1384)
Thazin Saw Dala	Maternal half-sister	
Thazin Saw U	Maternal half-sister	
Nyi Kan-Kaung	Maternal half-brother	Gov. of Dala (r. 1370/71–1388/89)
Tala Mi Daw	Paternal half-sister	Queen of Hanthawaddy (r. 1384–1390)
Baw Ngan-Mohn	Paternal half-brother	Heir-apparent of Hanthawaddy (c. 1370s–1384)

=== Consorts ===
Queen	Rank	Notes
Piya Yaza Dewi	Chief queen (r. 1384–1392)	Married in 1383
Tala Mi Daw	Principal Queen (r. 1384–1390)	Half-sister and first wife; married in 1383
Mi Kha-Dun-Mut	Queen (r. 1384−?)	Zeik-Bye's daughter
Mi Hpyun-Gyo	Queen (r. 1384−?)	Zeik-Bye's daughter
Yaza Dewi	Chief Queen (r. 1392–1421)	
Lawka Dewi	Queen (r. 1392–1421)	
Thiri Maya Dewi	Queen (r. 1392–1421)	
Tala Thuddhamaya	Queen (1384–1421)	Mother of Binnya Ran I and Shin Saw Pu; married 1383
Thupaba Dewi	Queen (1403–1421)	Sister of Minkhaung I. Married Razadarit as part of the 1403 peace treaty in a marriage of state
Saw Pyei Chantha	Queen (1408–1421)	Daughter of Minkhaung I, captured in 1408 and raised as Razadarit's queen
Shin Mi-Nauk	Queen (1408–1421)	Queen of Minkhaung I captured in 1408 and raised as Razadarit's queen

=== Issue ===
The following is a list of the king's children as reported in the various parts of the Razadarit Ayedawbon chronicle. The chronicle does not provide the mother of most children.

Name	Mother	Notes
Baw Law Kyan Daw	Tala Mi Daw	First child; executed on the order of Razadarit
Tala Mi Kyaw	?	Wife of Saw Maha-Rit (m. by 1401–1402); Queen consort of King Minkhaung I of Ava (1402–1421?)
Tala Mi Saw	?	Governor of Martaban? (1442/43–?); Wife of Gov. Smin Bayan Upakaung
Binnya Dhammaraza	?	King of Hanthawaddy (1421–1424)
Binnya Ran I	Tala Thuddhamaya	King of Hanthawaddy (1424–1446)
Shin Saw Pu	Tala Thuddhamaya	Queen Regnant of Hanthawaddy (1454–1471)
Binnya Kyan	?	Viceroy of Martaban (1422–1442/43)
Binnya Set	?	Governor of Dagon (1415–1418)

== Historiography ==
The earliest extant chronicle about Razadarit is the 16th-century Razadarit Ayedawbon chronicle. It is also the chronicle that provides the most detailed, reliable information about him and the developmental years of the Martaban–Hanthawaddy dynasty. The main Burmese chronicles also provide an extensive coverage of the king as part of their narrative of the Ava–Pegu wars. The Pak Lat Chronicles also devote a large section on the king but its provenance and reliability of the early 20th century chronicle still need to be assessed. However, smaller chronicles such as the Slapat Rajawan and Mon Yazawin provide minimal information about the king. The Slapat, written by a monk, was mainly concerned with the religious patronage of the Shwedagon Pagoda, gives only a single paragraph to the entire life of Razadarit whose achievements were mainly political.

Event	Razadarit Ayedawbon (c. 1560s)	Pak Lat (1912)	Slapat Rajawan (1766)	Maha Yazawin (1724)	Yazawin Thit (1798)	Hmannan Yazawin (1832)
Date of birth	28 January 1368 (Note: (Pan Hla 2005: 356, footnote 1): Friday, 8th waxing of Tabodwe 729 ME = 28 January 1368)	1367/68	c. 1367/68	not mentioned		
Accession	4 January 1384 (Note: (Pan Hla 2005: 356, footnote 1): Monday, 12th waxing of Tabodwe 745 ME = 4 January 1384)	2 January 1384 (Note: (Pan Hla 2005: 161): 10th waxing of Tabodwe 745 ME = 2 January 1384)	1383/84	1383/84 (Note: (Maha Yazawin Vol. 1 2006: 290) and (Maha Yazawin Vol. 2 2006: 140): 745 ME = 30 March 1383 to 28 March 1384)	1383/84 (Note: (Yazawin Thit Vol. 1 2012: 195): 745 ME = 30 March 1383 to 28 March 1384)	1383/84 (Note: (Hmannan Vol. 1 2003: 417) and (Hmannan Vol. 2 2003: 185): 745 ME = 30 March 1383 to 28 March 1384)
Start of Forty Years' War	1384/85 (Note: (Pan Hla 2005: 164–165): Soon after Razadarit's accession; the chronicle reporting suggests 746 ME, 1384–85)	1387/88 [sic] (Note: (Pan Hla 2005: 169, footnote 1): Pak Lat, which editor Pan Hla refers to as the Mon version, says the war began in 749 ME (1387/88). But 749 ME appears to be a copying error of 746 ME.)	not mentioned	1386/87 (Note: (Maha Yazawin Vol. 1 2006: 290): 748 ME = 29 March 1386 to 29 March 1387)	1385/86 (Note: (Yazawin Thit Vol. 1 2012: 195): 747 ME = 29 March 1385 to 28 March 1386)	1386/87 (Note: (Hmannan Vol. 1 2003: 417): 748 ME = 29 March 1386 to 29 March 1387)
Length of reign	~38 years	38 [sic] (Note: Pak Lat (Pan Hla 2005: 356, footnote 1) says he reigned 38 years between 745 ME and 782 ME. He could have reigned for at most 37 years.)	38	40	~38 (Note: Year of Death, 783 ME – Year of Accession, 747 ME = ~38 years)	40
Date of Death	1421/22	1420/21 [sic]	1421/22	1423/24 (Note: (Maha Yazawin Vol. 2 2006: 140): Razadarit died in 785 ME. (Maha Yazawin Vol. 2 2006: 56): Razadarit died in the following year after Minkhaung I's death in 784 ME.)	1421/22 (Note: (Yazawin Thit Vol. 1 2012: 265): Minkhaung died in 783 ME, and Razadarit died two months later in the same year (783 ME).)	1423/24 or 1422/23 [sic] (Note: Hmannan is inconsistent. (Hmannan Vol. 2 2003: 185) follows Maha Yazawin's reporting that Razadarit died in 785 ME (1423/24). But (Hmannan Vol. 2 2003: 52) accepts that Yazawin Thit's date of death for Minkhaung (783 ME, 1421/22) but keeps Maha Yazawin's reporting that Razadarit died in the following year after Minkhaung's death, which now means 784 ME (1422/23). Hmannan should have said Razadarit died about two years after Minkhaung's death, if it wished to keep 785 ME as date of death of Razadarit.)
Age at Death	53 (54th year)	53 (54th year)	53 (54th year)	not mentioned		

== Bibliography ==
- Athwa, Sayadaw (1906) [1766]. "Slapat des Ragawan der Königsgeschichte". Die äthiopischen Handschriften der K.K. Hofbibliothek zu Wien (in German). 151. Translated by P.W. Schmidt. Vienna: Alfred Hölder.
- Aung-Thwin, Michael A. (2017). Myanmar in the Fifteenth Century. Honolulu: University of Hawai'i Press. ISBN 978-0-8248-6783-6.
- Fernquest, Jon (Spring 2006). "Rajadhirat's Mask of Command: Military Leadership in Burma (c. 1384–1421)" (PDF). SBBR. 4 (1). Archived from the original (PDF) on 19 February 2009.
- Fernquest, Jon (Autumn 2006). "Crucible of War: Burma and the Ming in the Tai Frontier Zone (1382–1454)" (PDF). SOAS Bulletin of Burma Research. 4 (2). Archived from the original (PDF) on 15 April 2019.
- Harvey, G. E. (1925). History of Burma: From the Earliest Times to 10 March 1824. London: Frank Cass & Co. Ltd.
- Htin Aung, Maung (1967). A History of Burma. New York and London: Cambridge University Press.
- Kala, U (2006) [1724]. Maha Yazawin (in Burmese). Vol. 1–3 (4th printing ed.). Yangon: Ya-Pyei Publishing.
- Lieberman, Victor B. (2003). Strange Parallels: Southeast Asia in Global Context, c. 800–1830, volume 1, Integration on the Mainland. Cambridge University Press. ISBN 978-0-521-80496-7.
- Maha Sithu (2012) [1798]. Kyaw Win; Thein Hlaing (eds.). Yazawin Thit (in Burmese). Vol. 1–3 (2nd ed.). Yangon: Ya-Pyei Publishing.
- Pan Hla, Nai (2005) [1968]. Razadarit Ayedawbon (in Burmese) (8th printing ed.). Yangon: Armanthit Sarpay.
- Phayre, Major Gen. Sir Arthur P. (1873). "The History of Pegu". Journal of the Asiatic Society of Bengal. 42. Oxford University.
- Phayre, Lt. Gen. Sir Arthur P. (1883). History of Burma (1967 ed.). London: Susil Gupta.
- Royal Historical Commission of Burma (2003) [1832]. Hmannan Yazawin (in Burmese). Vol. 1–3. Yangon: Ministry of Information, Myanmar.
- Sandamala Linkara, Ashin (1997–1999) [1931]. Rakhine Razawin Thit (in Burmese). Vol. 1–2. Yangon: Tetlan Sarpay.
- Sein Lwin Lay, Kahtika U (2006) [1968]. Min Taya Shwe Hti and Bayinnaung: Ketumadi Taungoo Yazawin (in Burmese) (2nd printing ed.). Yangon: Yan Aung Sarpay.
- Shorto, H.L. (1963). "The 32 "Myos" in the Medieval Mon Kingdom". Bulletin of the School of Oriental and African Studies, University of London. 26 (3). Cambridge University Press: 572–591. doi:10.1017/s0041977x00070336. JSTOR 611567. S2CID 154584199.
- Shwe Naw (1922) [1785]. Mon Yazawin (in Burmese). Translated by Shwe Naw. Yangon: Burma Publishing Workers Association Press.
- Stadtner, Donald M. (2015). "Rajadhiraj's Rangoon Relics and a Mon Funerary Stupa". Journal of the Siam Society. 103: 63–88.
- Than Tun (December 1959). "History of Burma: A.D. 1300–1400". Journal of Burma Research Society. XLII (II).

Razadarit Hanthawaddy Dynasty Born: 28 January 1368 Died: c. December 1421
Regnal titles
Preceded by Binnya U	King of Hanthawaddy; 1384–1421	Succeeded by Binnya Dhammaraza
