= Tala Mi Daw =

Tala Mi Daw တလမည်ဒေါ

Queen of the Northern Palace of Hanthawaddy
- Reign: 5 January 1384 – c. March 1390
- Predecessor: Sanda Dewi
- Successor: Lawka Dewi
- Born: c. 1368; Pegu (Bago)?
- Died: c. March 1390; Pegu
- Spouse: Razadarit
- Issue: Bawlawkyantaw
- Father: Binnya U
- Mother: Sanda Dewi
- Religion: Theravada Buddhism

Tala Mi Daw (Burmese: တလမည်ဒေါ, pronounced [təla̰ mì dɔ́]; also တလမေဒေါ; c. 1368 – 1390) was the first wife of King Razadarit of Hanthawaddy. She was a half-sister of Razadarit and a daughter of King Binnya U by queen Sanda Dewi.

In late 1382, Daw eloped with her half-brother Binnya Nwe (Razadarit). They were soon caught. Because of the intervention of their aunt Princess Maha Dewi, the king relented and allowed the couple to be married. But soon after in May 1383, Nwe fled to Dagon (Yangon) to raise a rebellion. Binnya U died during the rebellion.

They had a son named Bawlawkyantaw. However King Razadarit's decision to keep the one-time flower seller Piya Yaza Dewi as his chief queen consort led Tala Mi Daw to despair.

Razadarit grew tired of Tala Mi Daw and cast her aside, taking away all the jewels bestowed upon her by their father Binnya U. Heartbroken, Daw committed suicide in 1390.

Following her death, Razadarit ordered the execution of their son, fearing Bawlawkyantaw would seek revenge from his father when he got older. Bawlawkyantaw swore a terrible oath prior to his execution, one which would haunt his father.

== Bibliography ==
- Harvey, G. E. (1925). History of Burma: From the Earliest Times to 10 March 1824. London: Frank Cass & Co. Ltd.
- Htin Aung, Maung (1967). A History of Burma. New York and London: Cambridge University Press.
- Kala, U (1724). Maha Yazawin (in Burmese). Vol. 1–3 (2006, 4th printing ed.). Yangon: Ya-Pyei Publishing.
- Pan Hla, Nai (1968). Razadarit Ayedawbon (in Burmese) (8th printing, 2005 ed.). Yangon: Armanthit Sarpay.
- Royal Historical Commission of Burma (1832). Hmannan Yazawin (in Burmese). Vol. 1–3 (2003 ed.). Yangon: Ministry of Information, Myanmar.

Tala Mi Daw Hanthawaddy Dynasty Born: c. 1368 Died: c. March 1390
Royal titles
Preceded by Sanda Dewi	Queen of Hanthawaddy; 5 January 1384 – c. March 1390	Succeeded by Lawka Dewi
