= Ma Pyit-Nwe =

Burmese royal ( c. 1360s–1390)

Pyit-Nwe; ပစ်နွဲ
- Born: Pyit-Nwe c. 1360s Myaungmya, Martaban Kingdom
- Died: c. February 1390; Myaungmya, Hanthawaddy Kingdom
- House: Hanthawaddy
- Father: Laukpya
- Mother: (unnamed chief consort of Laukpya)

Ma Pyit-Nwe (Mon: မပေတ်နဲ, Burmese: မပစ်နွဲ, Burmese pronunciation: [maʔ pjɪʔ nwɛ́]; c. 1360s–1390) was a Martaban–Hanthawaddy royal who fought against King Razadarit of Hanthawaddy in the Ava–Hanthawaddy War (1385–1391). A son of Viceroy Laukpya of Myaungmya, Pyit-Nwe led the defense of his father's capital Myaungmya in 1390. His decision to engage Razadarit's forces outside the city's fortified defenses led to the fall of the city and the entire province. Defiant till the end, Pyit-Nwe rejected Razadarit's offer to serve in the royal service, and chose to be executed instead.

== Background ==
Ma (Note: (Pan Hla 2005: 6, footnote 1 and 8, footnote 1): "Ma" in Mon is an honorific for males that means "male or lineage", and roughly equivalent to Burmese "Nga" or "Maung".) Pyit-Nwe was born to a large powerful noble family in the Mon-speaking Martaban–Hanthawaddy Kingdom, c. 1360s. (Note: Chronicles do not say when he was born. However, the conversations between Pyit-Nwe and Razadarit reported in the Razadarit Ayedawbon chronicle (Pan Hla 2005: 187–190) indicate the two cousins were of the same generation.) He was the youngest of the five children of Viceroy Laukpya of Myaungmya and his chief consort. Through his father, he was a half cousin, twice-removed of the then reigning king Binnya U. (Note: (Pan Hla 2005: 40): Laukpya's father [Pyit-Nwe's paternal grandfather] Saw E Pyathat was a son of Smin E Kan-Kaung, a half-brother of King Saw Zein (r. 1323–1330). It means Saw E Pyathat and Binnya U were half cousins of the same generation; Laukpya was King Binnya U's half-cousin, once removed; and Pyit-Nwe was Binnya U's half-cousin, twice removed.)

He was part of his father's exceptionally large family. In addition to his four full brothers (Min E, Min La-Mohn (Min Kyawswa), Min Yaw and Baw Ngo), Pyit-Nwe had either 63 or 65 half-siblings. (Note: (Pan Hla 2005: 49–51, 51 footnote 1): The Razadarit Ayedawbon says Laukpya had a total of 70 children (22 daughters and 48 sons) by 16 child-bearing wives but its detailed listing of the children yields only 68 children (16 daughters and 52 sons).) He grew up at a time when his father had become the de facto independent ruler of the Myaungmya province (since 1364). When his father raised a rebellion in 1385 against the new king Razadarit at Pegu, Pyit-Nwe had emerged as his father's righthand man. He is said to have been an expert swordsman, able to cut down thick sheets of metal and even rocks with his sword.

== Battle of Myaungmya ==
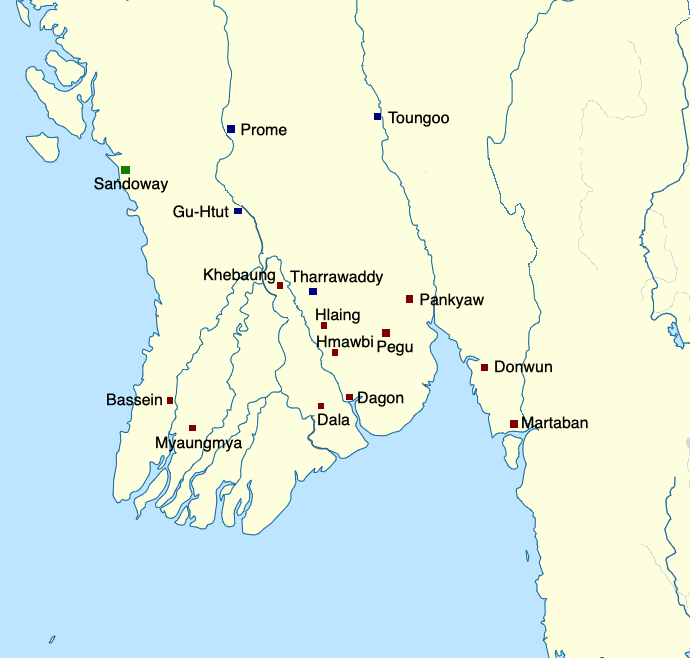
Hanthawaddy forces focused their attacks on Bassein and Myaungmya in their 1389–1390 campaign

Pyit-Nwe is remembered in Burmese history for the battle of Myaungmya in 1390. As recounted in the Razadarit Ayedawbon chronicle, he had been put in charge of the defense of the provincial capital by his father. When Razadarit's forces marched towards Myaungmya, Pyit-Nwe saw an opportunity to settle the affairs once and for all. Viewing Razadarit's forces, which had come off a major defeat at the battle of Bassein (Pathein), as teetering on the brink of collapse, the commander decided to engage the Hanthawaddy army in an open battle. Despite his father's serious misgivings about the plan, a confident Pyit-Nwe overruled his father, and wrote a letter to Razadarit, urging the king to personally participate in the upcoming battle. He even taunted the king that two of them should fight a duel on their favorite war elephants.

It turned out that he was playing right into Hanthawaddy's hands. The Hanthawaddy high command had been trying to draw the enemy outside the fortified walls since they had failed to take a heavily fortified Bassein. Although they were tempted by Pyit-Nwe's offer to fight outside Myaungmya's walls, the cautious Hanthawaddy senior staff did not want Razadarit to fight in the frontline. But the 22-year-old king overruled them, and sent back a letter to Pyit-Nwe, promising that he "the king of kings" himself would come out and fight; that if he lost, he would leave the Myaungmya province (as far east as Khebaung) alone; and that if he won, he would not kill Laukpya but rather exile the viceroy to spend the rest of his life at the foothills of the Shwe Dagon Pagoda.

The next day the two sides fought not far from the gates of Myaungmya. The respective commanders—Pyit-Nwe on his war elephant E-Nwe and Razadarit on his war elephant Nga-Yet-Nwe—soon came face to face. In the ensuing battle, Pyit-Nwe managed to strike first, landing a blow on the king's forehead with his sword sheath (because he could not get his sword out of the sheath), nearly knocking out the king. Razadarit's mahouts managed to retreat about 20 to 30 meters (Note: (Pan Hla 2005: 189, footnote 1): The Razadarit Ayedawbon chronicle, which Pan Hla called the Burmese version, gives 10 ta (32 m); the Pak Lat Chronicles which Pan Hla called the Mon version, gives 10 lan (18.82 m).) giving the dazed king a chance to recover from the blow. Razadarit then charged back, and taking advantage of his bigger elephant's sheer strength over Pyit-Nwe's, he leaned in and struck back, cutting off one of Pyit-Nwe's ears. Pyit-Nwe's elephant soon succumbed to repeated attacks and collapsed. Pyit-Nwe was thrown off the elephant and captured by the Hanthawaddy troops. Myaungmya's defenses simply folded afterwards. Hanthawaddy forces got inside the gates. Laukpya tried to flee, but was caught.

== Aftermath ==
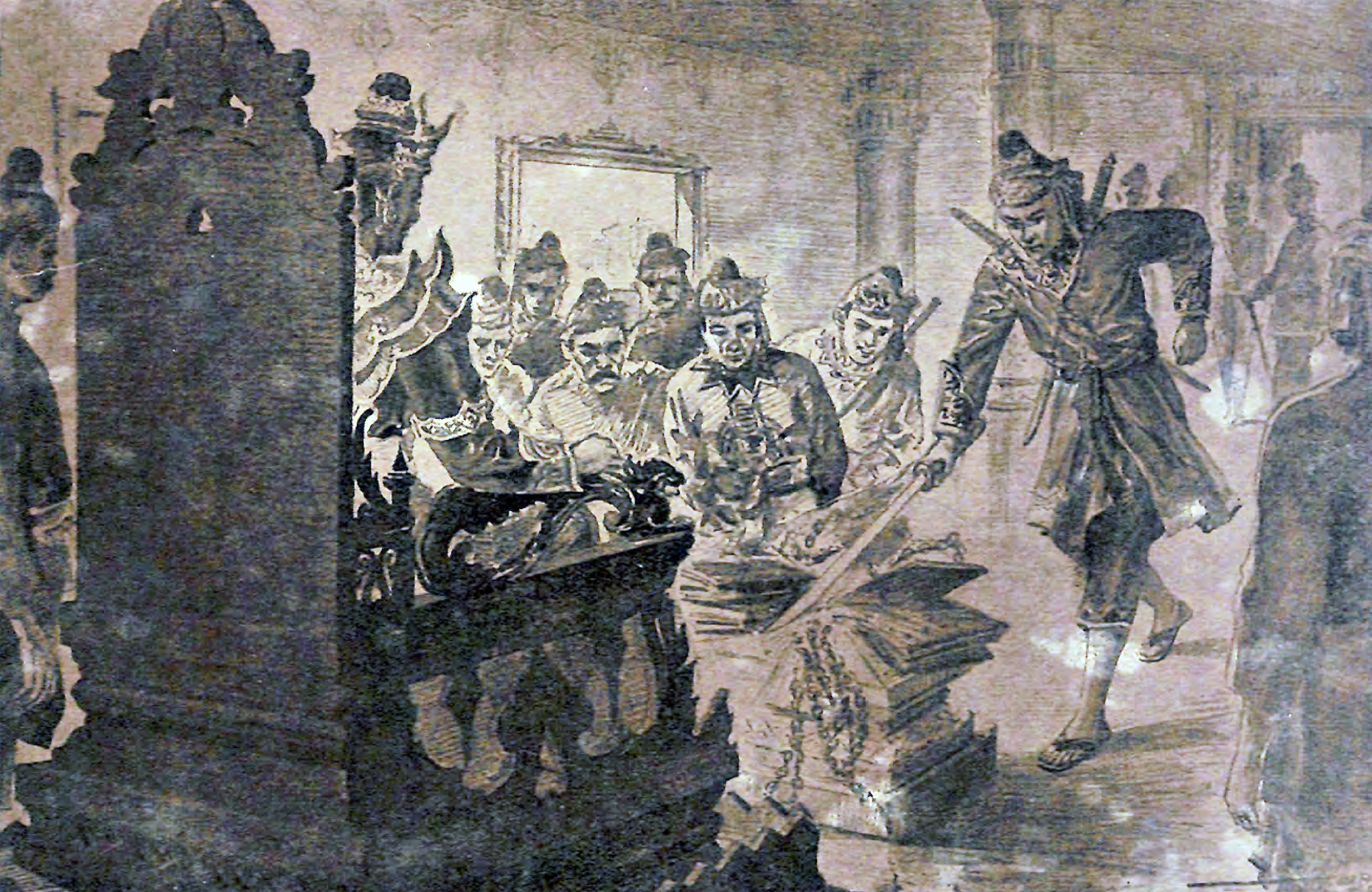
An illustration from Rachathirat, 1946 printed edition by an unknown Thai artist. Ma Pyit-Nwe, who will be executed soon, gave his sword to King Razadarit after the battle of Myaungmya. According to Rachathirat, a Thai version of Razadarit Ayedawbon, The king had ordered Lagun Ein to test his newly royal sword in front of him.

After the battle, as he had promised to Pyit-Nwe, Razadarit spared Laukpya's life and sent him to Dagon. Next, the king asked Pyit-Nwe to join his service. But the commander still had not come to terms that his side had lost. He not only refused the offer but also reminded Razadarit that had his sword not jammed, the king would have been cut down on the spot, and that the king would from now on remember who gave him the scar on the royal forehead every time he looked in the mirror.

Razadarit ignored the insult, and asked him to reconsider. He even allowed Pyit-Nwe to show off his swordsmanship. After Pyit-Nwe's swords play, in which he cut down sheets of iron and stacks of rocks with his sword, the king complimented the commander's skills, and again asked him to join the service. Pyit-Nwe again refused, and asked to be executed instead. Taken aback, Razadarit reluctantly ordered Pyit-Nwe's execution.

The fall of Myaungmya was a major turning point in the war. Razadarit's forces swept through the entire province in the next few weeks, taking Khebaung (north of modern Hinthada) by the end of March 1390, and after a period of regrouping, Gu-Htut (present-day Myan-Aung) and nearby Ahlwe inside Ava territory. Historian Arthur Purves Phayre called Myaungmya's decision to engage Hanthawaddy forces in an open battle a mistake, as Myaungmya becoming "too venturesome after success".

== Bibliography ==
- Fernquest, Jon (Spring 2006). "Rajadhirat's Mask of Command: Military Leadership in Burma (c. 1384–1421)" (PDF). SBBR. 4 (1). Archived from the original (PDF) on 19 February 2009.
- Harvey, G. E. (1925). History of Burma: From the Earliest Times to 10 March 1824. London: Frank Cass & Co. Ltd.
- Kala, U (2006) [1724]. Maha Yazawin (in Burmese). Vol. 1–3 (4th printing ed.). Yangon: Ya-Pyei Publishing.
- Maha Sithu (2012) [1798]. Myint Swe; Kyaw Win; Thein Hlaing (eds.). Yazawin Thit (in Burmese). Vol. 1–3 (2nd printing ed.). Yangon: Ya-Pyei Publishing.
- Pan Hla, Nai (2005) [1968]. Razadarit Ayedawbon (in Burmese) (8th printing ed.). Yangon: Armanthit Sarpay.
- Phayre, Lt. Gen. Sir Arthur P. (1967) [1883]. History of Burma. London: Susil Gupta.
- Royal Historical Commission of Burma (2003) [1832]. Hmannan Yazawin (in Burmese). Vol. 1–3. Yangon: Ministry of Information, Myanmar.
