= Bawlawkyantaw =

Baw Law Kyan Daw ဘောလောကျန်းထော

Heir Presumptive of Hanthawaddy
- Reign: 1383–1390
- Predecessor: Baw Ngan-Mohn (Heir-Apparent)
- Successor: Binnya Dhammaraza (Heir-Apparent)
- Born: 1383; Pegu (Bago), Hanthawaddy kingdom
- Died: c. April 1390; Pegu, Hanthawaddy kingdom
- Father: Razadarit
- Mother: Tala Mi Daw
- Religion: Theravada Buddhism

Baw Law Kyan Daw (Burmese: ဘောလောကျန်းထော, [bɔ́ lɔ́ tɕáɰ̃ dɔ́]; 1383 – 1390) was the first child of King Razadarit of Hanthawaddy Pegu. The prince is best known for his famous oath before his execution on the orders of his father that he shall be reborn to fight against his father if he were innocent. Razadarit was concerned that the young prince would later raise a rebellion against him as he had driven the prince's mother Queen Tala Mi Daw to commit suicide, and feared that the young prince would one day avenge his mother's death.

The people of Hanthawaddy and the people of rival Kingdom of Ava widely believed that Prince Minye Kyawswa of Ava was the reincarnation of Baw Law Kyan Daw, fulfilling the prophecy of the oath. Over a century later, King Shwey Tee would also claim that he was Baw Law Kyan Taw reincarnated, and finally conquered the Mon kingdom.

== Execution ==
Razadarit eventually ordered the execution of his own son at a young age. Razadarit was in Bassein (Pathein) when he ordered the execution of his eldest child, only about seven years old, who was in Pegu (Bago). It was c. April 1390. (Note: According to the main Burmese chronicles Maha Yazawin (Maha Yazawin Vol. 1 2006: 299) and Hmannan Yazawin (Hmannan Vol. 1 2003: 427), the prince was executed in 751 ME (28 March 1389 to 28 March 1390). But Razadarit Ayedawbon (Pan Hla 2005: 195) and Yazawin Thit (Hmannan Vol. 1 2003: 429) give 752 ME (29 March 1390 to 28 March 1391). Since Minye Kyawswa was born in 752 ME, it means Bawlawkyantaw died in early 752 ME (c. April 1390).)

The king's executioners took the prince to the Shwemawdaw Pagoda. The young prince was imprisoned for three days at the pagoda during which he was said to have reread the Abhidhamma (part of Buddhist scriptures).

According to chronicles, on the day of his execution, the young prince swore an oath that would enter into Burmese history:

I do not plot against my father. Neither is there any fault in me. My father and mother played together as children. When she grew to womanhood, he took her beauty and then cast her away. She was a king's daughter, but he used her like a slavewoman and drove her to an evil death...
... If I am guilty of treason by thought, word or deed, may I suffer in the fires of the nether regions for a thousand cycle times. If I am innocent, may I be reborn in the dynasty of Ava kings, and may I become the scourge of my father. (Note: Standard chronicles (Maha Yazawin Vol. 1 2006: 299) and (Hmannan Vol. 1 2003: 427) say the prince wished to destroy the kingdom of Mons. Razadarit Ayedawbon (Pan Hla 2005: 195) says the prince swore to fight his father (not the kingdom of Mons).)

Razadarit was greatly disturbed when he heard of the terrible oath. In the superstitious world of Burmese politics, he was alarmed when Shin Mi-Nauk, the wife of Prince Min Swe of Ava fetched to eat various foods from Lower Burma before she became pregnant. She gave birth to Minye Kyawswa a year after Baw Law Kyan Daw's death. Indeed, Minye Kyawswa would later grow up to be Razadarit's nemesis.

== Bibliography ==
- Harvey, G. E. (1925). History of Burma: From the Earliest Times to 10 March 1824. London: Frank Cass & Co. Ltd.
- Htin Aung, Maung (1967). A History of Burma. New York and London: Cambridge University Press.
- Pan Hla, Nai (2005) [1968]. Razadarit Ayedawbon (in Burmese) (8th printing ed.). Yangon: Armanthit Sarpay.
- Phayre, Major Gen. Sir Arthur Purves (1873). "The History of Pegu". Journal of the Asiatic Society of Bengal. 42. Oxford University: 47–55.
- Royal Historical Commission of Burma (2003) [1832]. Hmannan Yazawin (in Burmese). Vol. 1–3. Yangon: Ministry of Information, Myanmar.

Bawlawkyantaw Hanthawaddy Dynasty Born: 1383 Died: c. April 1390
Royal titles
Preceded by Baw Ngan-Mohn	Heir to the Hanthawaddy Throne; 1383 – 1390	Succeeded by Binnya Dhammaraza
