= Ava–Hanthawaddy War (1401–1403) orders of battle =

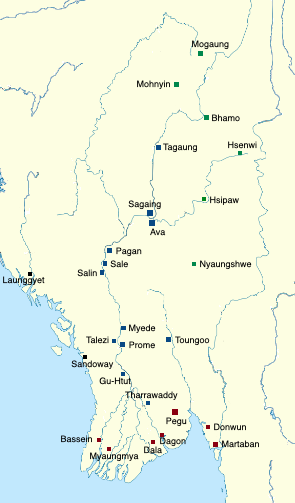
Hanthawaddy forces attacked Ava territories from Tharrawaddy to Tagaung in 1401–1402, and up to Prome in 1402–1403.

This is a list of orders of battle for the Second Ava–Hanthawaddy War in which the Royal Ava Armed Forces defended an invasion by the Royal Hanthawaddy Armed Forces between 1401 and 1403.

== Background ==
=== Sources ===
The orders of battles for Ava in this article are sourced from the main royal chronicles—the Maha Yazawin, the Yazawin Thit and the Hmannan Yazawin, which primarily narrate the war from the Ava side. (Note: See (Maha Yazawin Vol. 1 2006: 311, 319–320), (Yazawin Thit Vol. 1 2012: 213, 218–219) and (Hmannan Vol. 1 2003: 446–447, 457–459).) The orders of battle for Hanthawaddy Pegu are mainly sourced from Nai Pan Hla's version of the Razadarit Ayedawbon, which has incorporated narratives of the Pak Lat Chronicles. (Note: See (Pan Hla 2005: 205–206, 224, 227–228) for the orders of battle. See (Pan Hla 2005: 222, 223, 225, 226, 227, 228, 229) all of which refer to the "Burmese language manuscript", which by Pan Hla means the Burmese language Razadarit Ayedawbon chronicle.)

=== Adjustment of strength figures ===
The military strength figures in this article have been reduced by an order of magnitude from those reported in the chronicles, following G.E. Harvey's and Victor Lieberman's analyses of Burmese chronicles' military strength figures in general. (Note: See (Harvey 1925: 333–335)'s "Numerical Note". (Lieberman 2014: 98) writing on the First Toungoo period concurs: "Military mobilizations were probably more of a boast than a realistic estimate. Modern industrial states have difficulty placing 10% of their people under arms.")

== Invasion of Ava (1401–1402) ==
Circa 15 November 1401, (Note: (Pan Hla 2005: 205, footnote 2): Tuesday, 9th waxing of Nadaw 763 ME = Monday, 14 November 1401. If it was on a Tuesday, the date should be 15 November 1401.) Hanthawaddy forces led by King Razadarit invaded Ava by land and by river.

=== Hanthawaddy Pegu ===
The Razadarit Ayedawbon chronicle provides the most detailed description of Pegu's order of battle: (1) a naval invasion force (~5000 to 7000 troops) (Note: (Pan Hla 2005: 205, footnote 1): In the Binnya Dala's version of the chronicle, referred to as "the Burmese language version" by the editor Nai Pan Hla, the troop strength of the naval invasion force was at most 5000 strong. Nonetheless, Pan Hla used "70,000 troops" in the main text (Pan Hla 2005: 205), which translates to 7000 troops after adjusting by an order of magnitude per (Harvey 1925: 333–335).) that sailed up to Ava, (2) a 3000-strong army that laid siege to Prome (Pyay), and (3) an army of unknown strength that guarded the capital Pegu (Bago). The main royal chronicles provide higher figures, ranging from 6000 troops and 500 war boats (Yazawin Thit) to 16,000 troops and 300 war boats (Maha Yazawin and Hmannan Yazawin).

Pegu Order of Battle, 1401–1402
| Chronicle | Unit | Commanders | Strength (Note: Unless otherwise stated, the military mobilization figures in this article are reduced by an order of magnitude from those reported in the royal chronicles, per G.E. Harvey's analysis in his History of Burma (1925) in the section Numerical Note (pp. 333–335).) | Reference(s) |
|---|---|---|---|---|
| Razadarit Ayedawbon (c. 1560s) | Royal Hanthawaddy Armed Forces | King Razadarit | Navy: 13 flotillas (5000–7000 troops) Army: 3 regiments (3000 troops) | |
| Razadarit Ayedawbon (c. 1560s) | Vanguard flotillas | Lagun Ein; Smin Upakaung the Elder †; Byat Za | 3 flotillas, 130 war boats: · 30 ironclad war boats · 50 copper-clad war boats · 50 general armored war boats | |
| Razadarit Ayedawbon (c. 1560s) | Main flotillas | Smin Sam Lek; Smin Phut-Phit; Smin Bayan; Smin Than-Kye; Smin Awa Mingyi; Smin Awa Naing; Razadarit | 7 flotillas | |
| Razadarit Ayedawbon (c. 1560s) | Rearguard flotillas | Dein Mani-Yut; Smin Ye-Thin-Yan; Smin Bya Paik | 3 flotillas | |
| Razadarit Ayedawbon (c. 1560s) | Prome Area Army | Smin Yawgarat; Maha Thamun; Saw Maha-Rit | 3 regiments (3000 troops, 150 cavalry, 50 elephants) | |
| Razadarit Ayedawbon (c. 1560s) | Capital Defense Corps | E-Ba-Ye Zeik-Bye | troop strength not reported | |
| Maha Yazawin (1724) | Royal Hanthawaddy Armed Forces | Razadarit | 16,000 troops, 300 boats | |
| Maha Yazawin (1724) | Navy | Dein Mani-Yut; Byat Za; Smin Awa Naing; E-Ba-Ye Zeik-Bye; Razadarit | ? | |
| Maha Yazawin (1724) | Prome Area Army | Saw Maha-Rit | ? | |
| Yazawin Thit (1798) | Royal Hanthawaddy Armed Forces | Razadarit | 6000+ troops, 500 boats | |
| Yazawin Thit (1798) | Navy | Lagun Ein; Smin Upakaung the Elder †; Smin Awa Naing; Byat Za; E-Kaung-Pein; Dein Mani-Yut; Smin Ye-Thin-Yan; Baw Kyaw; Smin Yawgarat; Thilawa of Bassein; Razadarit | 6000 troops, 500 boats | |
| Yazawin Thit (1798) | Prome Area Army | Saw Maha-Rit | ? | |
| Hmannan Yazawin (1832) | Royal Hanthawaddy Armed Forces | Razadarit | 16,000 troops, 300 boats | |
| Hmannan Yazawin (1832) | Navy | Dein Mani-Yut; Byat Za; Smin Awa Naing; E-Ba-Ye Zeik-Bye; Razadarit | ? | |
| Hmannan Yazawin (1832) | Prome Area Army | Saw Maha-Rit | ? | |

=== Ava ===
The Maha Yazawin chronicle (1724) names 12 forts along the Irrawaddy River to face the invasion forces. The Yazawin Thit (1798) mentions only Prome, Ava, Myede, and Pagan in its narrative, and the Hmannan Yazawin (1832) repeats the Maha Yazawin's account.

Ava Order of Battle, 1401–1402
| Unit | Commander | Strength | Theater | Reference(s) |
| Royal Ava Armed Forces | King Minkhaung I | 12+ regiments | | |
|---|---|---|---|---|
| Prome Regiment | Letya Pyanchi of Prome | including battalions from Gu-Htut, Hlaing and Tharrawaddy | Prome region | |
| Myede Regiment | Lord of Myede | | Myede | |
| Sagu Regiment | Theinkhathu II of Sagu | | Sagu | |
| Salin Regiment | Nawrahta of Salin | | Salin | |
| Pakhan Nge Regiment | Lord of Pakhan Nge | | Pakhan Nge | |
| Sale Regiment | Lord of Sale | | Sale | |
| Pagan Regiment | Uzana of Pagan | | Pagan (Bagan) | |
| Talok Regiment | Yazathu of Talok | | Talok | |
| Pakhan Gyi Regiment | Tarabya I of Pakhan | | Pakhan Gyi | |
| Sagaing Regiment | Prince Theiddat | | Sagaing | |
| Singu Regiment | Baya Gamani of Singu | | Singu | |
| Capital Defense Corps | Minkhaung I | Unspecified numbers of infantry, cavalry and war elephants | Ava capital region | |

Furthermore, the Ava court claimed that the kingdom's defensive network included over 50 fortified towns whose rulers were loyal to Minkhaung. According to Michael Aung-Thwin, the forts were "strategically arranged throughout the kingdom so that each town was within one day's or two days' march of another." The following are the lists reported in the three main chronicles.

Ava's fortified towns and cities, 1401–1402
| Chronicle | Total | Along the Irrawaddy | Southern Division | Northern Division | Reference(s) |
|---|---|---|---|---|---|
| Maha Yazawin (1724) | 54 | 1. Chundaung; 2. Myadaung; 3. Tagaung; 4. Ngasingu; 5. Singu; 6. Ywatha; 7. Sagaing; 8. Ava; 9. Pakhan Gyi; 10. Pakhan Nge; 11. Talok; 12. Pagan; 13. Sale; 14. Yenangyaung; 15. Salin; 16. Sagu; 17. Legaing; 18. Myede; 19. Thayet; 20. Mindon; 21. Mindat; 22. Prome; 23. Ahlwe; 24. Gu-Htut; 25. Tharrawaddy | 1. Toungoo; 2. Taungdwin; 3. Yamethin; 4. Wadi; 5. Yindaw; 6. Pinle; 7. Hlaingdet; 8. Nyaungyan; 9. Myinsaing; 10. Mekkhaya; 11. Pindale; 12. Pyinzi; 13. Kyaukpadaung; 14. Pahtanago; 15. Pin; 16. Natmauk; 17. Thagaya | 1. Myedu; 2. Yene; 3. Siboktara; 4. Sitha; 5. Dabayin; 6. Badon; 7. Amyint; 8. Kanni; 9. Bangyi; 10. Yaw; 11. Htilin; 12. Laungshay | |
| Yazawin Thit (1798) | 41 | 1. Chundaung; 2. Myadaung; 3. Tagaung; 4. Singu; 5. Ywatha; 6. Sagaing; 7. Ava; 8. Pakhan Gyi; 9. Pakhan Nge; 10. Talok; 11. Pagan; 12. Sale; 13. Yenangyaung; 14. Salin; 15. Sagu; 16. Legaing; 17. Myede; 18. Thayet; 19. Mindon; 20. Mindat; 21. Prome; 22. Ahlwe; 23. Gu-Htut; 24. Tharrawaddy | 1. Toungoo; 2. Taungdwin; 3. Yamethin; 4. Yindaw; 5. Thagaya | 1. Myedu; 2. Ngarane; 3. Siboktara; 4. Sitha; 5. Dabayin; 6. Badon; 7. Amyint; 8. Kanni; 9. Bangyi; 10. Yaw; 11. Htilin; 12. Laungshay | |
| Hmannan Yazawin (1832) | 53 | 1. Chundaung; 2. Myadaung; 3. Tagaung; 4. Ngasingu; 5. Singu; 6. Ywatha; 7. Sagaing; 8. Ava; 9. Pakhan Gyi; 10. Pakhan Nge; 11. Talok; 12. Pagan; 13. Sale; 14. Yenangyaung; 15. Salin; 16. Sagu; 17. Legaing; 18. Myede; 19. Thayet; 20. Mindon; 21. Mindat; 22. Prome; 23. Ahlwe; 24. Gu-Htut; 25. Tharrawaddy | 1. Toungoo; 2. Taungdwin; 3. Yamethin; 4. Wadi; 5. Yindaw; 6. Pinle; 7. Hlaingdet; 8. Nyaungyan; 9. Myinsaing; 10. Mekkhaya; 11. Pindale; 12. Pyinzi; 13. Kyaukpadaung; 14. Pahtanago; 15. Natmauk; 16. Thagaya | 1. Myedu; 2. Ngarane; 3. Siboktara; 4. Sitha; 5. Dabayin; 6. Badon; 7. Amyint; 8. Kanni; 9. Bangyi; 10. Yaw; 11. Htilin; 12. Laungshay | |

Of the 17 Southern Division fortifications reported in the Maha Yazawin, at least twelve are located in the Ava capital region, not in the south. Indeed, the Yazawin Thit omits the twelve and reports only five in the Southern Division. Furthermore, it omits the Ngasingu fort, and keeps just the nearby Singu fort in the Irrawaddy Division. The Hmannan Yazawin largely follows the Maha Yazawin's list, excluding the fort at Pin, while keeping the nearby Natmauk fort. Note that Michael Aung-Thwin gives a total of 53 forts, citing the Maha Yazawin, even though it is the Hmannan's list that sums up to 53.

== Battle of Sale (April 1402) ==
Chronicles do provide little information with regard to the units involved. The Razadarit Ayedawbon mentions Smin Upakaung the Younger as a cavalry commander in the Hanthawaddy detachment from the retreating Hanthawaddy navy that tried to raid Sale. The main chronicles say two cavalry battalions sent down from Ava defended the town.

=== Hanthawaddy Pegu ===
Pegu Order of Battle, 1402
| Unit | Commander | Strength | Reference(s) |
| Sale Expedition Force | ? | ? | |
|---|---|---|---|
| Cavalry battalion | Smin Upakaung the Younger | ? | |

=== Ava ===
Ava Order of Battle, 1402
| Unit | Commander | Strength | Reference(s) |
|---|---|---|---|
| Sale Regiment | Lord of Sale | ? | (Note: (Maha Yazawin Vol. 1 2006: 318) identifies the commanders as Baya Gamani and Yazathingyan. (Yazawin Thit Vol. 1 2012: 218) says the commanders were the brothers Nga Chit Swe and Nga Chit Thin. (Hmannan Vol. 1 2003: 455–456) follows the Maha Yazawin's narrative.) |
| 1st Cavalry Battalion | Baya Gamani of Singu | 150 horses | (Note: (Maha Yazawin Vol. 1 2006: 318) identifies the commanders as Baya Gamani and Yazathingyan. (Yazawin Thit Vol. 1 2012: 218) says the commanders were the brothers Nga Chit Swe and Nga Chit Thin. (Hmannan Vol. 1 2003: 455–456) follows the Maha Yazawin's narrative.) |
| 2nd Cavalry battalion | Yazathingyan of Siboktara | 150 horses | (Note: (Maha Yazawin Vol. 1 2006: 318) identifies the commanders as Baya Gamani and Yazathingyan. (Yazawin Thit Vol. 1 2012: 218) says the commanders were the brothers Nga Chit Swe and Nga Chit Thin. (Hmannan Vol. 1 2003: 455–456) follows the Maha Yazawin's narrative.) |

== Second siege of Prome (1402) ==
=== Hanthawaddy Pegu ===
The following is the Hanthawaddy order of battle as listed in the Yazawin Thit chronicle. The Maha Yazawin and Hmannan chronicles mention only Razadarit, Dein Mani-Yut and Byat Za as commanders. The Razadarit Ayedawbon only says that a combined land and naval forces reinvaded again, right after the new year, without listing an order of battle.

Pegu Order of Battle, 1402
| Unit | Commander | Strength | Theater | Reference(s) |
| Royal Hanthawaddy Armed Forces | Razadarit | 10,000 troops | Prome, Ahlwe, Gu-Htut, Hlaing | |
|---|---|---|---|---|
| Army | Byat Za; E-Ba-Ye Zeik-Bye; Baw Kyaw; Smin Bya Paik | 4 regiments (3000 troops, 10 elephants) | | |
| Navy | Dein Mani-Yut; Smin Yawgarat; Upakaung the Younger; Lagun Ein; Smin Pun-Si; E-Kaung-Pein; Smin Maw-Khwin; Razadarit | 7000 troops, 200 armored war boats | | |

=== Ava ===
Ava Order of Battle, 1402
| Unit | Commander | Strength | Theater | Reference(s) |
| Prome Corps | Letya Pyanchi of Prome | | Prome, Ahlwe, Gu-Htut, Hlaing | |
|---|---|---|---|---|
| Prome Regiment | Letya Pyanchi of Prome | | | |
| Ahlwe battalion | Tuyin Ponnya of Ahlwe | | | |
| Gu-Htut battalion | Baya Kyawthu of Gu-Htut | | | |

== Battle of Thaymathauk (c. early December 1402) ==
=== Ava ===
Ava Order of Battle, 1402
| Unit | Commander | Strength | Reference(s) |
| Vanguard Army | Thado of Myohla | 5 regiments (5000 troops, 300 cavalry, 20 war elephants) | (Note: (Pan Hla 2005: 224) says Minkhaung sent 30,000 troops to relieve the siege of Prome.) |
|---|---|---|---|
| Pakhan Regiment | Tarabya I of Pakhan | | (Note: (Pan Hla 2005: 224) says Minkhaung sent 30,000 troops to relieve the siege of Prome.) |
| Pagan Regiment | Uzana of Pagan | | (Note: (Pan Hla 2005: 224) says Minkhaung sent 30,000 troops to relieve the siege of Prome.) |
| Taungdwin Regiment | Thihapate III of Taungdwin | | (Note: (Pan Hla 2005: 224) says Minkhaung sent 30,000 troops to relieve the siege of Prome.) |
| Talok Regiment | Yazathu of Talok | | (Note: (Pan Hla 2005: 224) says Minkhaung sent 30,000 troops to relieve the siege of Prome.) |
| Myohla Regiment | Thado of Myohla | | (Note: (Pan Hla 2005: 224) says Minkhaung sent 30,000 troops to relieve the siege of Prome.) |

=== Hanthawaddy Pegu ===
Pegu Order of Battle, 1402
| Unit | Commander | Strength | Reference(s) |
| Prome Area Army | Byat Za | 7 regiments (4000 troops, 80 cavalry, 10 war elephants) | (Note: According to Pan Hla's version of the Razadarit Ayedawbon (Pan Hla 2005: 225), the Hanthawaddy strength figures were: 30,000 troops and 70 war elephants.) |
|---|---|---|---|
| 1st Regiment | Lagun Ein | | (Note: According to Pan Hla's version of the Razadarit Ayedawbon (Pan Hla 2005: 225), the Hanthawaddy strength figures were: 30,000 troops and 70 war elephants.) |
| 2nd Regiment | Upakaung the Younger | | (Note: According to Pan Hla's version of the Razadarit Ayedawbon (Pan Hla 2005: 225), the Hanthawaddy strength figures were: 30,000 troops and 70 war elephants.) |
| 3rd Regiment | Smin Bya Paik | | (Note: According to Pan Hla's version of the Razadarit Ayedawbon (Pan Hla 2005: 225), the Hanthawaddy strength figures were: 30,000 troops and 70 war elephants.) |
| 4th Regiment | Baw Kyaw | | (Note: According to Pan Hla's version of the Razadarit Ayedawbon (Pan Hla 2005: 225), the Hanthawaddy strength figures were: 30,000 troops and 70 war elephants.) |
| 5th Regiment | E-Ba-Ye Zeik-Bye | | (Note: According to Pan Hla's version of the Razadarit Ayedawbon (Pan Hla 2005: 225), the Hanthawaddy strength figures were: 30,000 troops and 70 war elephants.) |
| 6th Regiment | Smin Awa Naing | | (Note: According to Pan Hla's version of the Razadarit Ayedawbon (Pan Hla 2005: 225), the Hanthawaddy strength figures were: 30,000 troops and 70 war elephants.) |
| 7th Regiment | Byat Za | | (Note: According to Pan Hla's version of the Razadarit Ayedawbon (Pan Hla 2005: 225), the Hanthawaddy strength figures were: 30,000 troops and 70 war elephants.) |

== Battle of Nawin (December 1402) ==
The battle of Nawin took place on 26 December 1402. (Note: (Yazawin Thit Vol. 1 2012: 220, footnote 3): Tuesday, 3rd waxing of Tabodwe 764 ME = 26 December 1402) It was the last battle of the war. Peace negotiations began about 10 days after the battle, c. 5 January 1403.

=== Ava ===
None of the main royal chronicles provides a specific order battle for Ava, except to say that the army included regiments from the Shan states. According to the Razadarit Ayedawbon and Yazawin Thit chronicles, the remnants of the Vanguard Army defeated in the battle of Thaymathauk also joined the main army.

Ava Order of Battle, December 1402
| Unit | Commander | Strength | Reference(s) |
| Main Army | Minkhaung I | 12,000 troops, 700 cavalry, 30 war elephants | (Note: (Yazawin Thit Vol. 1 2012: 219): 18,000 troops, 700 cavalry, 30 elephants. (Pan Hla 2005: 227): 7000 troops, 300 cavalry, 20 elephants) |

=== Hanthawaddy Pegu ===
Chronicles say that the Nawin fort was defended by three regiments, without specifying the troop strength.

Pegu Order of Battle, December 1402
| Unit | Commander | Strength | Reference(s) |
| Nawin Army | E-Ba-Ye Zeik-Bye (surrendered) | 3 regiments | |
|---|---|---|---|
| 1st Regiment | E-Ba-Ye Zeik-Bye (surrendered) | | |
| 2nd Regiment | Baw Kyaw † | | |
| 3rd Regiment | Smin Bya Paik † | | |

== Bibliography ==
- Aung-Thwin, Michael A. (2017). Myanmar in the Fifteenth Century. Honolulu: University of Hawai'i Press. ISBN 978-0-8248-6783-6.
- Harvey, G. E. (1925). History of Burma: From the Earliest Times to 10 March 1824. London: Frank Cass & Co. Ltd.
- Kala, U (2006) [1724]. Maha Yazawin (in Burmese). Vol. 1–3 (4th printing ed.). Yangon: Ya-Pyei Publishing.
- Lieberman, Victor B. (2014) [1984]. Burmese Administrative Cycles: Anarchy and Conquest, c. 1580–1760. Princeton University Press. ISBN 978-0-691-05407-0.
- Maha Sithu (2012) [1798]. Myint Swe; Kyaw Win; Thein Hlaing (eds.). Yazawin Thit (in Burmese). Vol. 1–3 (2nd printing ed.). Yangon: Ya-Pyei Publishing.
- Pan Hla, Nai (2005) [1968]. Razadarit Ayedawbon (in Burmese) (8th printing ed.). Yangon: Armanthit Sarpay.
- Royal Historical Commission of Burma (2003) [1832]. Hmannan Yazawin (in Burmese). Vol. 1–3. Yangon: Ministry of Information, Myanmar.
