= Ava–Hanthawaddy War (1401–1403) =

Military conflict in present-day Myanmar

- Part of the Forty Years' War
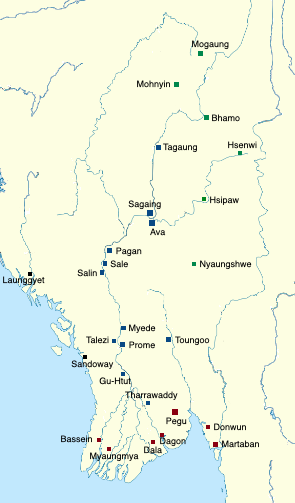
- Hanthawaddy forces attacked Ava territories from Tharrawaddy to Tagaung in 1401–1402, and up to Prome in 1402–1403.
Date	c. 15 November 1401 – c. 5 January 1403; (about 1 year, 1 month and 3 weeks)
Location	Ava Kingdom; (Present-day Upper Myanmar, northern Bago Region and northern Ayeyarwady Region)
Result	Ava victory Full results: Treaty of Prome; Ava and Hanthawaddy Pegu agree to the prewar border, and its exact demarcation points; Pegu may maintain its fort at Talezi until arrival of the upcoming rainy season Treaty of Kawliya; Pegu grants Ava the annual customs revenues of the port of Bassein, and 30 war elephants—annually; King Razadarit sanctions the marriage between King Minkhaung I and Princess Tala Mi Kyaw; King Minkhaung I agrees to a marriage of state between King Razadarit and Princess Thupaba Dewi
Territorial changes	Status quo ante bellum

Belligerents
Ava	Hanthawaddy Pegu

Commanders and leaders
Minkhaung I; Min Theiddat of Sagaing; Letya Pyanchi of Prome; Nawrahta of Salin; Thado of Myohla; Baya Gamani of Singu; Yazathingyan of Siboktara; Uzana Thinkhaya of Pagan; Tarabya I of Pakhan; Thihapate III of Taungdwin; Thray Sithu of Myinsaing; Yazathu of Talok; Lord of Myede; Lord of Sale	Razadarit; Byat Za; Dein Mani-Yut; Zeik-Bye (surrendered); Maha Thamun; Upakaung the Elder †; Upakaung the Younger; Saw Maha-Rit (executed); Smin Awa Naing; Smin Than-Kye; Smin Ye-Thin-Yan; Lagun Ein; Smin Bya Paik †; Baw Kyaw †

Strength
1401–1402 (Note: Unless otherwise stated, the military mobilization figures in this article are reduced by an order of magnitude from those reported in the royal chronicles, per G.E. Harvey's analysis in his History of Burma (1925) in the section Numerical Note (pp. 333–335).): Army: 12+ regiments (unknown infantry, 300+ cavalry); 1402–1403: Vanguard Army: 5 regiments (5,000 troops, 300 cavalry, 20 elephants); Main Army: 12 regiments (12,000 troops, 700 cavalry, 30 elephants)	1401–1402: Navy: 13 flotillas (5000–7000 troops, 300–500 war boats); Army: 3 regiments (3000 troops, 150 cavalry, 50 elephants); 1402–1403: Navy: 5 flotillas (7000 troops, 200–300 war boats) (Note: The initial strength was 200; later grew to 300 in the upriver campaign, following the battle of Nawin.); Army: 4 regiments (3000+ troops, 80 cavalry, 10 elephants) (Note: Per the Razadarit, the strength was 3000 troops; per Hmannan Yazawin, 4000 troops.)

Casualties and losses
Total unknown	Total unknown: Battle of Nawin: 700–800 killed; ~700 captured
- See Orders of battle for the Ava–Hanthawaddy War (1401–1403) for more information.

The Ava–Hanthawaddy War (1401–1403) (Burmese: အင်းဝ–ဟံသာဝတီ စစ် (၁၄၀၁–၁၄၀၃)) was a military conflict between Ava and Hanthawaddy Pegu that lasted from 1401 to 1403. It was the second of the decades-long wars between the two kingdoms, both located in present-day Myanmar. The upstart regime of King Minkhaung I of Ava survived two dry season invasions by King Razadarit of Hanthawaddy.

The casus belli was Razadarit's decision to exploit Ava's prolonged succession crisis that began in 1400. When the new king Minkhaung struggled to consolidate power, Razadarit invaded with a large naval armada via the Irrawaddy River in 1401, aiming to achieve a quick submission by Minkhaung. Caught completely off guard, Ava defenses could only hunker down inside their forts along the river. The Hanthawaddy navy went on to dominate the entire river up to Tagaung but did not have enough manpower to take any of the forts. As Minkhaung refused to submit or counterattack, Razadarit roamed freely in the upcountry until he was persuaded to withdraw by a Buddhist monk mediator in early 1402. The Hanthawaddy king began a slow deliberate withdrawal, stopping by Pagan (Bagan) to build a monastery there. He fully withdrew only when he learned that Ava's southern forces had defeated the Hanthawaddy army outside Prome (Pyay), and captured his daughter, Princess Tala Mi Kyaw, in the process.

In response, Razadarit renewed the siege of Prome in September. It took Minkhaung three months to send down an army. Though Minkhaung's first army was thoroughly defeated, Minkhaung himself came down with a second, larger army, and defeated the Hanthawaddy garrison at Nawin on 26 December 1402, ending the siege. The initial peace negotiations began in January 1403. The two kings subsequently met at the Myathitin Pagoda in Prome to affirm the prewar border. After a second round of negotiations to ensure long-term peace, Minkhaung agreed to a marriage of state between Razadarit and his younger sister Thupaba Dewi; in return, Razadarit sanctioned Minkhaung's marriage to Tala Mi Kyaw, and agreed to grant Ava the annual revenues of the port of Bassein (Pathein).

Minkhaung emerged stronger after the war. He had finally won the support of his vassals, and began using his newfound power almost immediately. From 1404 onwards, he picked off his eastern and northern neighboring Shan states one by one each year, alarming both Ming China and Pegu. After Ava seized Arakan on the western littoral in 1406, Razadarit broke off relations, fearing Pegu would be next. In 1408, he decided to strike first, and sent an army to Arakan. The Ava–Hanthawaddy War (1408–1418) ensued.

== Background ==
This war had its origins in the First Ava–Hanthawaddy War (1385–1391) when King Swa Saw Ke of Ava unsuccessfully tried to replace King Razadarit of Hanthawaddy Pegu with his own nominee, Viceroy Laukpya of Myaungmya. Although Swa and Razadarit signed a 1391 peace treaty that affirmed Pegu's independence, Razadarit vowed to avenge the invasions when the opportunity presented itself.

In the following decade, Mon-speaking Hanthawaddy Pegu under Razadarit's leadership emerged as a full-fledged regional power. By 1400, Pegu "had grown in economic and political power", and greatly benefited from the growth in chiefly maritime trade with South India, Ayutthaya, Malacca and maritime Southeast Asia, and Ming China. Its eastern neighbors, Chiang Mai (Lan Na) and Ayutthaya (Siam) now recognized Pegu on equal terms.

Ava's experience was different. Throughout the 1390s, the Burmese-speaking kingdom in the central dry zone was preoccupied with the Shan-speaking kingdom of Maw (Mong Mao) to its north. The two kingdoms had fought a war between 1387 and 1389/90, and went to war again in 1392–1393. Ava even sought Chinese help in containing their common enemy Maw, (Note: Ava sent three diplomatic missions to the Ming court. The first mission arrived at the imperial court on 14 April 1393; the second mission in December 1395, and the third, four months later, c. April 1396.) but found no relief as the Ming government itself could not establish firm control of its Yunnan borderlands until 1398.

== Prelude ==
=== Ava's succession crisis ===
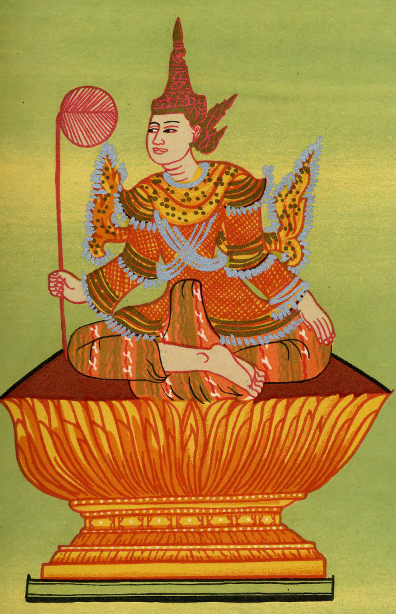
A depiction of the Min Tara nat spirit, which came about after the assassination of King Tarabya

In April 1400, King Swa died, and Crown Prince Tarabya ascended the throne. Five months into his reign, Tarabya went insane, and was assassinated by Governor Thihapate of Tagaung in an attempt to seize power. The court executed Thihapate, and offered the throne to Tarabya's 27-year-old half-brother Prince Min Swe of Pyinzi.

However, the prince refused as he had no power base. Due to his acrimonious rivalry with his elder half-brother since childhood, Swe was kept out of Tarabya's administration, and did not command a single regiment. He instructed the court to offer the throne to Governor Maha Pyauk of Yamethin, who commanded a sizeable force. Prince Theiddat implored his elder brother to reconsider. When Swe still refused, Theiddat assassinated Pyauk. It was only then that Swe ascended the throne, with the regnal title of Minkhaung, in November 1400.

His formal accession changed little. Unlike Tarabya who had been trained since his youth to succeed the kingship, Minkhaung had little experience dealing with the powerful court, or the myriad vassal rulers of the kingdom. His first acts as king were to reappoint the existing rulers, and repay the leader of the court, Min Yaza of Wun Zin, for his support. (Note: Minkhaung appointed Min Yaza's son and son-in-law as governors of Yamethin and Badon respectively.) In all, outside of appointing Prince Theiddat at Sagaing, the new king was able to install his loyalists only in a few small districts: Thihapate at Taungdwin, Thado at Myohla, Baya Gamani at Singu, and Yazathingyan at Siboktara.

=== View from Pegu ===
According to the Razadarit Ayedawbon chronicle, Razadarit "raised his fist in jubilation" when he heard of King Swa's death in 1400. However, he began seriously contemplating an invasion of his northern neighbor only in 1401 after receiving a stream of reports that Minkhaung did not command the loyalty of his vassals, and that the vassals themselves were not united behind any one power. For Razadarit, it was "the opportunity [he] had been waiting for." Knowing that he needed to strike before Minkhaung could consolidate power, Razadarit ordered his court to prepare for a full scale dry season invasion.

== First invasion (1401–1402) ==
=== Pegu battle plan ===
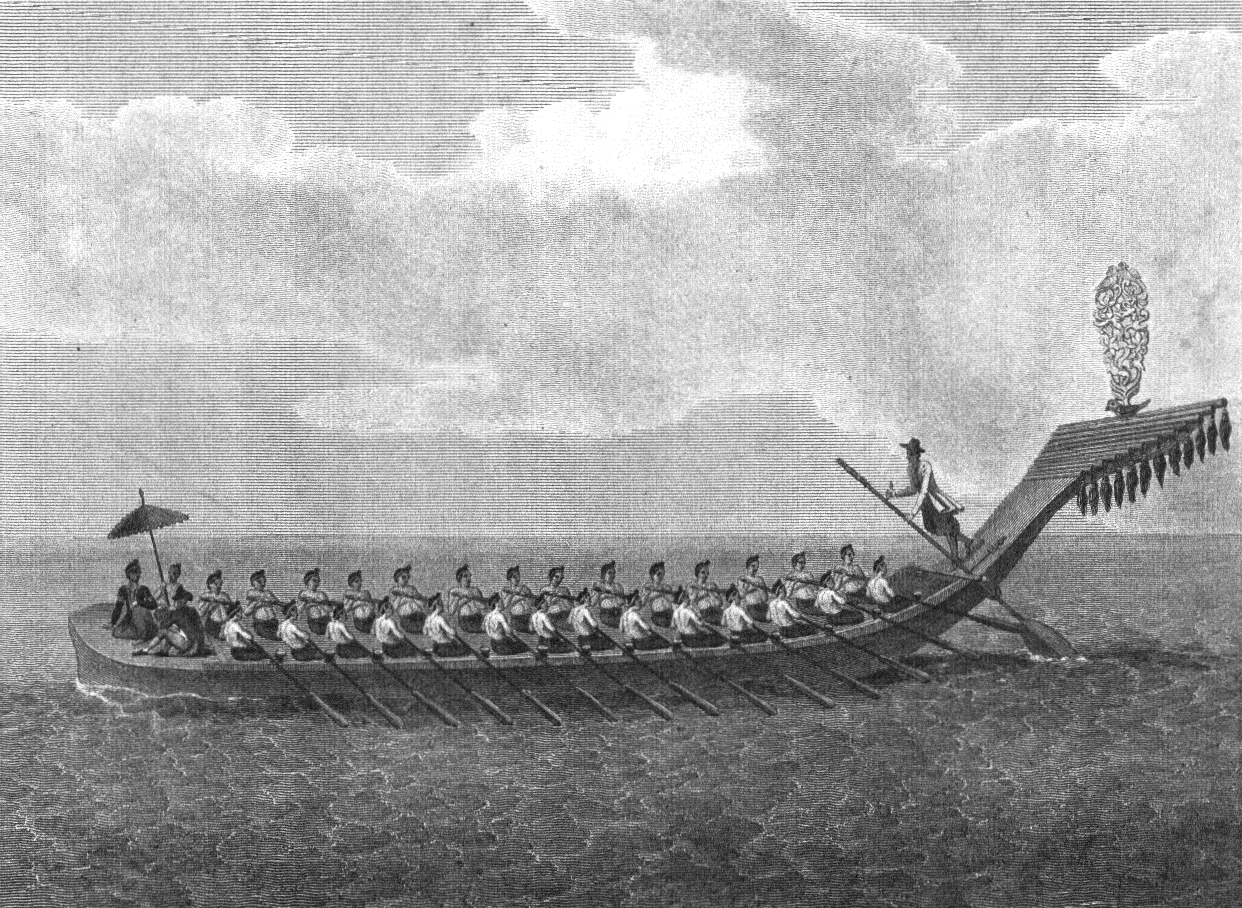
An 18th-century painting of a Burmese war boat on the Irrawaddy River

By the beginning of the dry season, Pegu had assembled a combined naval and land invasion force. The main force was a large naval armada, which according to the Razadarit Ayedawbon, consisted of 13 flotillas, some 4000 vessels of all types, carrying 5000 (or 7000) troops as well as horses and even elephants. A smaller army (3000 troops, 150 cavalry, 50 elephants) had also been raised. The main royal chronicles, which narrate primarily from the Ava side, provide two estimates of the armada: 500 war boats and 6000 troops (Yazawin Thit), and 300 war boats and 16,000 troops (Maha Yazawin and Hmannan Yazawin).

All sources indicate that the invasion forces were strong in terms of war boats but not in terms of troops. The Hanthawaddy navy's 300–500 war boats far exceeded the 120 and 80 war boats Ava used in the 1386–1387 and 1390–1391 campaigns, respectively. However, the combined (naval and land) troop strength of 8000–10,000 was only about a third to half the size of Ava's invasion forces of the 1386–1387 and 1390–1391 campaigns. (Note: Even the highest estimate of 16,000 troops represented only about half the size of Ava's infantry strength of 29,000 each in Ava's failed invasions of Pegu in 1386–1387 and 1390–1391.)

The plan thus relied on the armada delivering a speedy strike on the capital Ava (Inwa) via the Irrawaddy. Land battles would be reserved only for securing a few key port towns—Prome, in particular—along the river. The Pegu command expected "a pitched river battle" as their armada approached the Ava capital region. If more land battles were still necessary, they believed that Ava forces could be induced to fight outside the walls of Ava. Razadarit himself planned to lead the invasion, riding a large royal barge named Karaweik. His co-chief ministers and senior generals Byat Za and Dein Mani-Yut would accompany him. To defend his capital Pegu (Bago), the king assigned Zeik-Bye, another senior minister, to lead the Pegu defense corps.

=== Ava battle plan ===
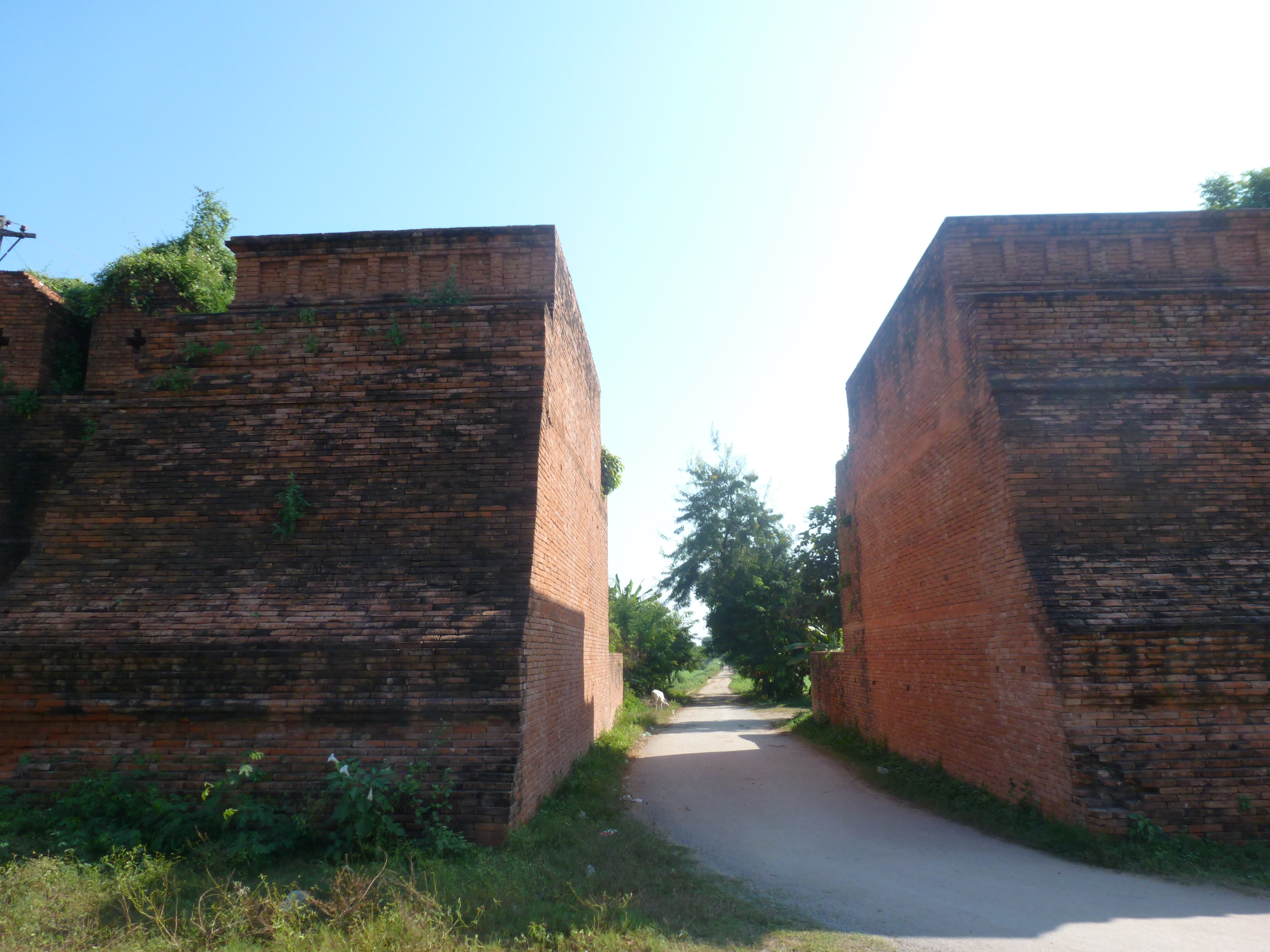
Remains of the Second Ring Outer Walls at Ava/Inwa today

The Ava command hastily drew up a plan only after the invasion had begun. Because they had not mobilized anything, they quickly settled on leveraging Ava's existing network of walled cities–53 in total—which were all "strategically arranged throughout the kingdom so that each town was within one day's or two days' march of another." They ordered all the main fortified towns along the Irrawaddy to bring all their regional manpower, horses, elephants and supplies behind the walls. Ava defenses now fielded a total of 12 forts along the invasion route: Prome (Pyay), Myede, Sagu, Salin, Pakhan Nge, Pakhan, Sale (Salay), Pagan (Bagan), Talok, Sagaing and Singu.

Ava's first stand would start at Prome. The port city's defenses included thick brick walls surrounded by a deep and wide moat, and mounted jingal wall guns atop the ramparts. (Note: The "gun" here probably was "a jingal, a metal tube about three feet long, mounted on a wooden stand, and throwing a ball, generally less than one pound weight". The guns were likely brought by Pyanchi, a son-in-law of Laukpya, from the Myaungmya province.) Prome's small flotilla, however, would not contest; its war boats had been moved to a lake inside the city. The city also took in the troops, horses and elephants that had retreated from Tharrawaddy and Gu-Htut. Prome's governor Letya Pyanchi, a son-in-law of Hanthawaddy Viceroy Laukpya of Myaungmya as well as an experienced commander, was to lead the defenses.

=== Opening campaign ===
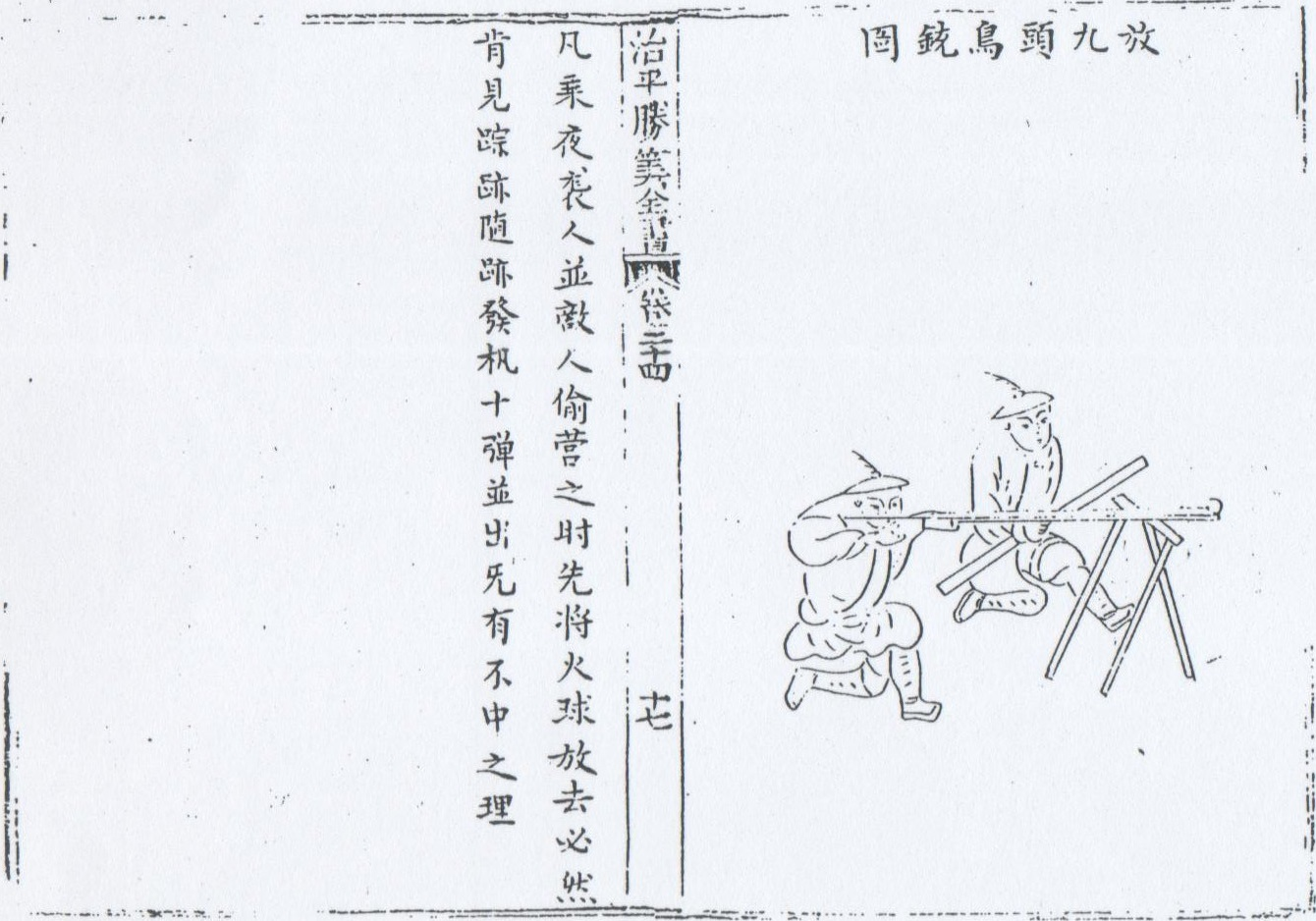
Prome's defenses included jingal wall guns. An example of a jingal gun used by the Chinese is shown here.

The invasion began c. 15 November 1401. (Note: Tuesday, 9th waxing of Nadaw 763 ME (Monday, 14 November 1401). If it was on a Tuesday, the date should be Tuesday, 15 November 1401.) The invaders quickly overran Tharrawaddy and Gu-Htut, and raced towards Prome. At the outskirts of Prome, the naval and land troops joined up on land, and tried to take the city. But the attacks had to be called off when Hanthawaddy forces suffered heavy casualties from the city's mounted guns.

"ငါတို့ကို ဝံ့မည်လော!?"
"Who would dare fight us!?"

— Razadarit's scornful response to Dein's cautious advice (Note: Razadarit's response (Burmese: "ငါတို့ကို ဝံ့မည်လော") came after Dein recommended: (1) not to proceed with the invasion without having taken Prome; (2) not to leave Princess Tala Mi Kyaw with her husband; and (3) to send her back to Dala-Twante, perhaps by accompanying her there.)

The Hanthawaddy command feared that a prolonged fight here could jeopardize their upriver campaign. Razadarit argued that the navy could still proceed with the invasion if the army could keep Prome neutralized. Dein strenuously cautioned against going deeper into enemy territory without having secured Prome. But the king chafed at his co-chief minister's caution, and rejected the advice. The high command now drew up a plan to maintain the siege, and set up an alternate supply station at Myede, 70 km north of Prome. They chose Khaunglaunggya, located north of Prome, as the siege army's headquarters, and the king appointed his son-in-law Saw Maha-Rit as the commander. Princess Tala Mi Kyaw, who had come along with the invasion force, decided to stay behind with her husband.

=== Advance to Ava ===
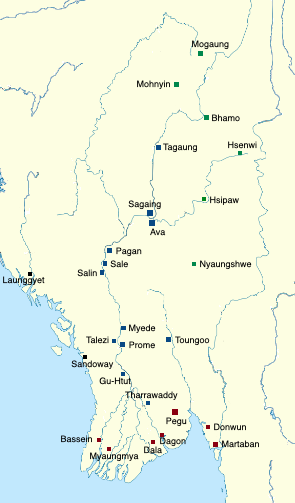
Hanthawaddy forces advanced as far north as Tagaung.

The new plan needed to be revised immediately. The armada discovered that Myede too was heavily fortified. Another son-in-law of Razadarit, Smin Upakaung the Elder, was killed while trying to charge the walls. The Hanthawaddy command now completely abandoned the idea of setting up supply stations. Their new plan called for the armada to sail directly towards Ava, and rely on their naval prowess to secure the riverine supply lines.

Though it may have been risky, the revised plan worked. It turned out that Ava's defenses were far less organized than the Hanthawaddy command had given credit for. The armada sailed up the river completely unopposed, burning down all the boats in their way. When they reached Pagan (Bagan), Razadarit was tempted to take the ancient capital for symbolic reasons but quickly decided against it after seeing the city's heavy fortifications. As they approached the Ava capital region—Ava and Sagaing on the opposite banks of the river—they still did not see the Ava navy. Puzzled, Razadarit dispatched his vanguard squadrons further up the river. The squadrons went up as far north as Tagaung (230 km from Ava) but found no traces of the enemy navy.

=== Stalemate ===
Razadarit now prepared for land battles. He set up his headquarters near the Shwe Kyet-Yet Pagoda (in present-day Amarapura), about 15 km north of Ava, and another base outside Sagaing across the river. He was sure that Ava forces would come out and dislodge him but he was mistaken. No one came. After ten days, a restive Razadarit dispatched a small unit to go behind Ava's frontlines to gather intelligence. The unit's commander Smin Than-Kye returned and reported that Ava forces were all behind the walls, and probably would not come out and fight. Razadarit was in a bind: he did not have the manpower to storm Ava or Sagaing but could not come to terms with a withdrawal either. He decided to maintain the status quo for the time being.

The Ava command too had adopted a wait-and-see approach. They had overestimated the strength of the enemy (16,000 versus the actual 5000 to 7000), and decided that they did not have enough troops to drive out the enemy. They had also figured that Razadarit would have to withdraw in a few months—certainly before the rainy season. (Note: The Ava command expected a withdrawal before Tagu (March/April) or Kason (April/May), before the rainy season began (late May).)

An awkward standoff ensued. In a test of wills, Razadarit remained stationed outside Ava while Minkhaung stayed put inside. Neither side initiated any attacks. In the following weeks, Razadarit began visiting unfortified towns along the river, worshipping at local pagodas there. He may have even spent three days at Tagaung by the Maw border. (Note: According to the Razadarit Ayedawbon and Maha Yazawin chronicles, Razadarit himself sailed up to Tagaung, and spent three days there. The Yazawin Thit says Razadarit sailed up to Male, not Tagaung. The Hmannan Yazawin chronicle accepts the Hanthawaddy navy led by Byat Za and Dein reaching Tagaung but rejects that Razadarit ever joined the trip.) Razadarit's trips increasingly irked Minkhaung as they seriously undermined his already weak authority with his vassals. He finally accepted the court's proposal to negotiate with Razadarit, and agreed to the selection of Shin Zawtayanta, a learned Buddhist monk from Pinya, as the lead negotiator. The monk personally wrote a letter to Razadarit, asking to see him at his camp, ostensibly to deliver a sermon. The letter was well received. The Hanthawaddy command too was looking for a face-saving way out. Razadarit personally invited the monk.

=== Withdrawal sermon ===
My goals for this campaign are to:

1. Avenge King Swa's invasions of Hanthawaddy that caused so much death and destruction in my country,
2. Incorporate the Kingdom of Ava into my realm,
3. Visit the famous religious sites, and perform meritorious deeds there to further the sasana, and
4. Be remembered as a great conqueror in history.

— Razadarit's answer to Zawtayanta's inquiry into the goals of the campaign (Note: The four reasons per the Razadarit Ayedawbon. The Maha Yazawin and Hmannan Yazawin do not include "to avenge King Swa's invasions".)

In mid-February 1402, (Note: The abbot of Sagyo Monastery met Razadarit c. the full moon of Tabaung 763 ME (16 February 1402).) Shin Zawtayanta visited the Shwe Kyet-Yet camp. He also brought a retinue of 300 men, carrying Minkhaung's presents for Razadarit. After briefly inquiring why Razadarit had come to the upcountry, the monk proceeded to deliver his prepared sermon, preaching the Buddhist doctrines regarding the "wickedness of war", and "the sin of bloodshed". Although the monk's preachings were "more or less common knowledge among Buddhists", they nevertheless provided Razadarit with a perfect "pretence" to withdraw.

After the sermon, Razadarit announced that he had indeed come to conquer the upcountry but now that he had a better understanding of the dhamma, he would return home as soon as his upriver naval squadrons got back to the base. In the meantime, as gestures of goodwill, the king freed over 20 prisoners of war to the monk's custody, and ordered the construction of a zayat (pavilion) on the premises of the Shwe Kyet-Yet Pagoda. The king broke up five of his golden barges, and donated the timber to construct the zayat. When the zayat was completed five days later, the king dedicated the zayat to the pagoda.

=== Withdrawal to Pagan ===
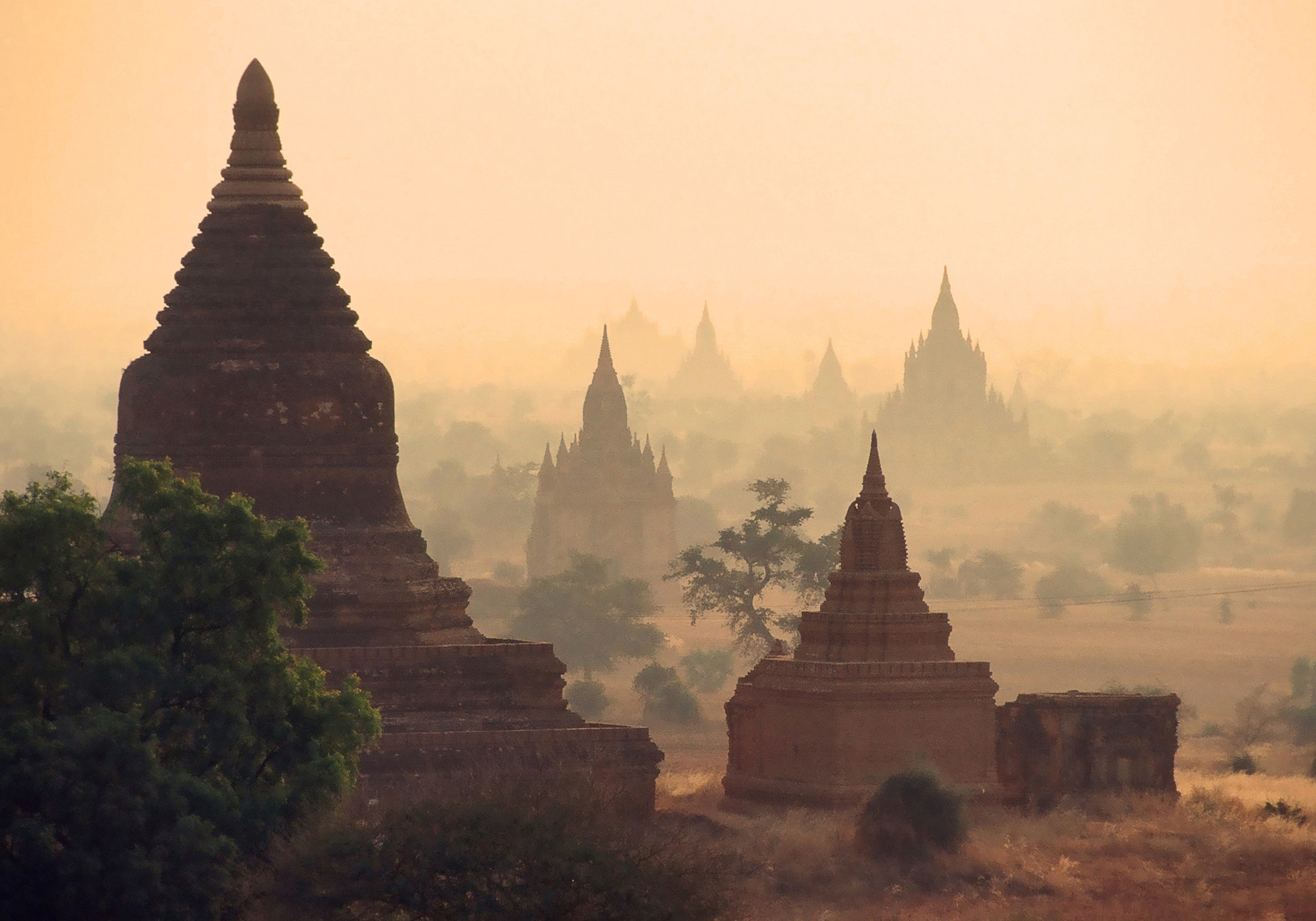
Pagan (Bagan) at dawn, present day

The withdrawal began c. late February. Razadarit had planned a slow deliberate withdrawal as he was determined to visit Pagan. He had also asked Shin Zawtayanta to accompany him there. When the Hanthawaddy navy finally left, a somber Minkhaung lamented that Razadarit had invaded his country without "breaking a sword or a lance", and that he would surely return again. The king ordered two cavalry battalions (300 troops in total) led by Baya Gamani and Yazathingyan to closely follow the Hanthawaddy navy, and sent another infantry battalion to burn down the zayat that Razadarit had just built. The burning nearly derailed the withdrawal. When Razadarit saw the smokes rising from the general area of the zayat, he was incensed, and vowed to turn back. Shin Zawtayanta as well as Byat Za and Dein had to dissuade the king, stating that "demerits accrue to the one who set fire to a good deed". The king relented, and continued sailing down to Pagan.

The entire armada docked at Pagan. To fulfill one of his lifelong goals, Razadarit ordered the construction of a monastery near the ancient royal capital. Ava forces inside the fortified city did not disturb the enemy. After the construction was complete, the king donated the monastery to Shin Zawtayanta. After spending about a month or so at Pagan, circa late March or early April, (Note: Razadarit was already in Sale after the new year had turned [on 30 March 1402], when he received the news that Khaunglaunggya had been sacked.) Razadarit set sail for the next town on his itinerary, Sale (Salay), about 50 km south of Pagan.

=== Battles of Prome and Sale ===
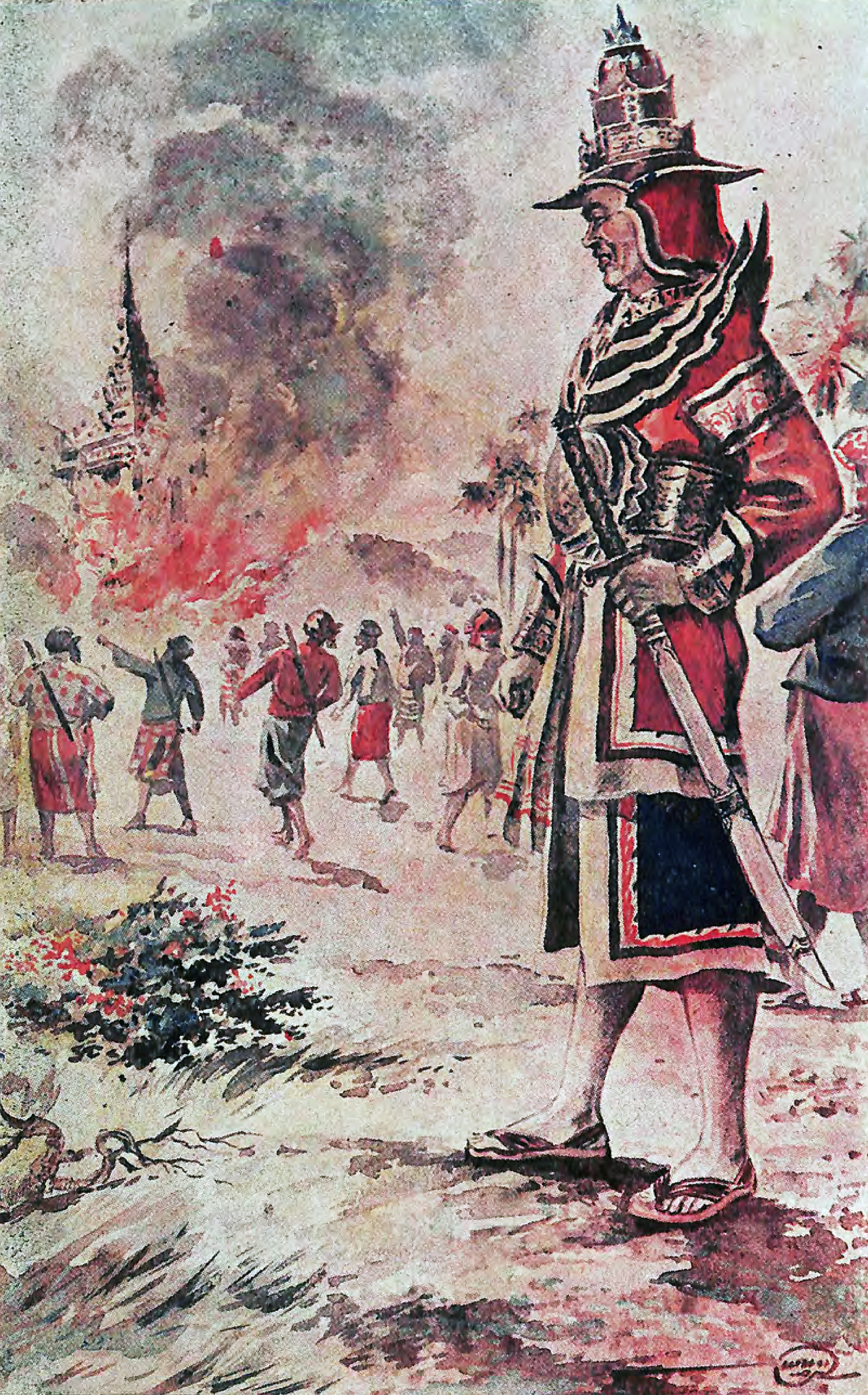
Minkhaung I ordered his army to burn down a Buddhist hall erected by Razadarit. An illustration from Rachathirat, a Thai version of Razadarit Ayedawbon, 1946 printed edition.

Sale was to be different however. Ava forces initially did not interfere with Hanthawaddy forces when they visited a local pagoda south of the walled town. But when Razadarit's men tried to take away a Buddha statue which they believed had been taken from their southern homeland by King Anawrahta of Pagan (r. 1044–1077) some three and a half centuries ago, Ava troops finally intervened. When Razadarit heard of the news, he sent in another force led by Commander Athari to retake the pagoda. Ava forces led by Baya Gamani and Yazathingyan stood their ground. An incensed Razadarit sent in more battalions but then suddenly called them back. He had just received the news that his Prome Area Army had been defeated at Khaunglaunggya, and that his daughter Princess Tala Mi Kyaw had been taken prisoner and sent to Ava.

Razadarit was further shocked that the battle had taken place a few days earlier. In that battle, Ava forces launched a coordinated counterattack on the Hanthawaddy army's headquarters from two sides—a regiment led by Governor Nawrahta of Salin from the outside the perimeter, and Prome's governor Letya Pyanchi's forces from the inside. The Hanthawaddy army was caught by surprise, and was quickly defeated. Its commander Saw Maha-Rit barely escaped on horseback, leaving behind his wife and his troops.

=== Complete withdrawal ===
Razadarit reflexively ordered to head back to Ava, about 250 km from Sale. Byat Za and Dein had to advise him that the rainy season was already around the corner, and that a dry season campaign with rested troops would be more effective. The king grudgingly agreed, and ordered a complete withdrawal. The armada sailed directly to its home naval base at Dala. Razadarit promptly had Saw Maha-Rit executed, and ordered his court to prepare for another full-scale invasion.

== Second invasion (1402–1403) ==
=== Preparations ===
Despite Razadarit's initial order, his senior staff later persuaded him to reduce the scope of the invasion to Prome. The king came to see that capturing Prome was strategically "essential to the safety of his kingdom." By the tail end of the rainy season, the Hanthawaddy command had assembled a sizable navy (7000 troops, 200 war boats) and an army (3000+ troops, 80 cavalry, 10 elephants). The king himself would lead the navy, and Byat Za would command the army.

At Ava, Minkhaung continued to have trouble mobilizing his forces. He still had not dispatched any reinforcements to the southern front when Hanthawaddy forces were massing near the border in September. Minkhaung's job may have been made more difficult by the need to keep enough troops in the north to "defend against any attack from the north". In any case, the defense of Ava's south was left to local governors. Southern governors for their part had built a wooden stockade south of Prome at a place called Hlaing (not Hlaing (Taikkyi)), which they believed would be more defensible than their border towns.

=== Opening campaign ===
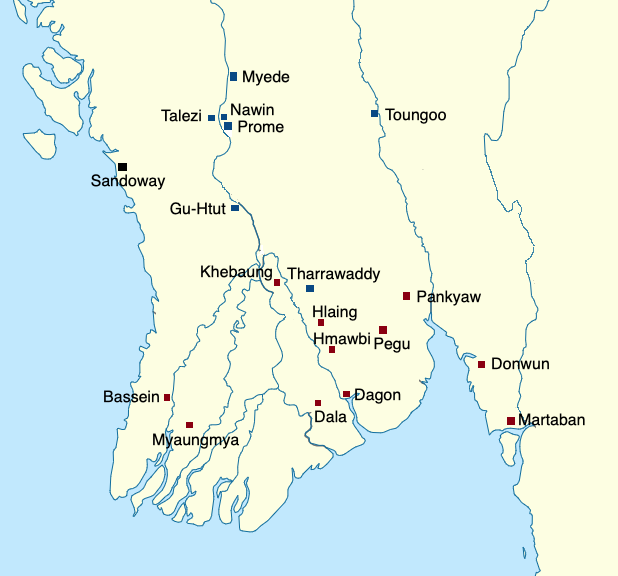
Hanthawaddy forces laid siege to Prome in 1402.

The second invasion began c. mid-September 1402. (Note: Razadarit launched his second campaign as the rains receded in 764 ME. The campaign lasted for another 3 to 4 months before the battle of Nawin on the 3rd waxing of Tabodwe 764 ME (26 December 1402). This means the campaign started sometime in September, probably after the end of the Buddhist Lent on 11 September 1402.) Hanthawaddy forces quickly seized Gu-Htut and Ahlwe as those governors had already evacuated to the Hlaing fort south of Prome. The Hanthawaddy navy followed up and blockaded the Hlaing port, while the army attacked the stockade. But when the fort's defenses proved solid, the Hanthawaddy command ordered their main forces to press on towards Prome while leaving a force to keep an eye on the fort. Meanwhile, Governor Letya Pyanchi had brought more conscripts from around the region into Prome. By the time Hanthawaddy forces reached the outskirts of Prome, they found the enemy had already retreated behind the city's brick walls.

=== Second siege of Prome ===
Razadarit, as he did a year earlier, initially ordered probing attacks from land and the river. The results this time were no different. Prome's formidable wall guns kept the invaders at bay. Razadarit ordered a complete naval and land blockade. The king stationed his main force east of the city, and a second force at Nawin, north of the city, while the Hanthawaddy flotilla blockaded the port. The blockade was effective. Prome was soon starving. It turned out that Pyanchi had brought in many conscripts in a rush but not enough provisions.

Meanwhile, the Ava command remained completely paralyzed. Remarkably, Minkhaung could not send any help for the next two months. Only in late November did the Ava king finally manage to send a supply convoy (2000 pack ponies, each carrying two tins (~82 liters, ~2.25 bushels) of rice) to Prome. Guarded by a regiment led by Governor Thado of Myohla, the convoy managed to slip through the Hanthawaddy lines north of the city, and reached Prome. When Thado's regiment broke through the Hanthawaddy lines again, and got back to Ava, the commander reported that the situation in Prome was still extremely dire, and that Minkhaung needed to send military help right away. Minkhaung, who was still waiting for enough troops to assemble a sizable force, agreed to send whatever forces he had in reserve: five regiments (5000 infantry, 300 cavalry, and 20 war elephants). Thado was given the overall command.

=== First Ava counterattack ===
After nearly three months into the siege, an Ava army finally approached the northern Hanthawaddy perimeter near Prome. In response, Byat Za himself marched with a sizable army (7 regiments, 4000 troops, 800 cavalry, 10 war elephants) to meet the enemy. At a place called Thaymathauk (also called Thawutti), the four Hanthawaddy vanguard regiments, commanded by Lagun Ein, Upakaung the Younger, Baw Kyaw and Bya Paik, ran into the Ava army. Outnumbered, the Hanthawaddy regiments were driven out of the battlefield into nearby woods. But the battle was not over. The rearguard regiments led by Byat Za launched a surprise attack on the Ava army the next day. The surviving vanguard forces came out of the woods to encircle the enemy. The Ava army was completely routed, and those that could escape fled in disarray.

=== Battle of Nawin ===
The victory made some Hanthawaddy commanders overconfident. Byat Za had to warn his officers celebrating the victory to review what went wrong and what could be improved. He was particularly concerned that their siege fortifications around Prome would not be able to hold if Ava returned with larger forces. While Dein agreed with Byat Za's assessment, another faction, led by senior minister Zeik-Bye, remained confident that they could hold the tide. Razadarit was in two minds. He accepted Byat Za's and Dein's recommendation to move the main army headquarters to Talezi on the west bank of the river. At the same time, he sided with Zeik-Bye's recommendation to maintain the siege by assigning three regiments at Nawin.

In late December, Minkhaung was finally on the move. He had managed to assemble a decent-sized army (12,000 troops, 700 cavalry, and 30 war elephants), by scouring troops from around the kingdom, including those from a few Shan-speaking vassals. As he did not have an overwhelming force, he planned to launch a surprise attack on Nawin. He had been kept apprised of the enemy formations by the commanders of the defeated vanguard army. Minkhaung's army came down fast to Myede. They did not rest. From Myede, they traveled the last 70 km by boat in a single night. At the dawn of 26 December 1402, (Note: Tuesday, 3rd waxing of Tabodwe 764 ME (Tuesday, 26 December 1402)) Ava forces planted their scaling ladders on the riverside walls of the Nawin fort, overpowered surprised Hanthawaddy troops, and opened the gates. Outnumbered Hanthawaddy troops were soon overwhelmed. About 700 to 800 troops were killed, and nearly as many were captured. The rest escaped by swimming across the river to the Hanthawaddy camp at Talezi. Of the three Hanthawaddy commanders, Baw Kyaw and Bya Paik fell in action, and Zeik-Bye was captured. Minkhaung triumphantly entered Prome.

=== Pegu counterattack ===
Across the river at Talezi, the Hanthawaddy command was completely shocked. They simply had not expected Minkhaung to have come down so quickly. In anger, Razadarit reflexively ordered his henchmen to execute all the troops who had swum across the river until his staff talked him out of it. After the king had calmed down, Dein and Byat Za proposed sending the navy to attack Ava's supply lines up the river. Their rationale was that Minkhaung's quick arrival meant his troops probably "brought nothing but what they slung on their shoulders", and that they would not be able to find anything in an already starving Prome. The king agreed. Over 300 Hanthawaddy war boats sailed up the river, attacking Ava supply boats as well as burning down rice depots at Thayet and Myede, or as far north as Malun and Magwe. Ava's supply depots further north in Sagu and Salin remained intact but they stopped shipping supplies.

The Hanthawaddy navy's scorched earth attacks caused alarm at the Ava camp. As the Hanthawaddy command had envisaged, Ava troops had indeed carried minimal supplies. About ten days after the battle of Nawin, the provisions were down to four or five days' worth. The Ava senior staff impressed upon Minkhaung that it would be difficult to hold Prome, let alone recover the southern districts. Though Minkhaung had vowed to inflict enough pain to prevent future invasions, he had to acknowledge his staff's assessment that the two forces were "too equally matched". He agreed to offer a peace treaty if Razadarit agreed to restore the prewar border.

== Peace treaties ==
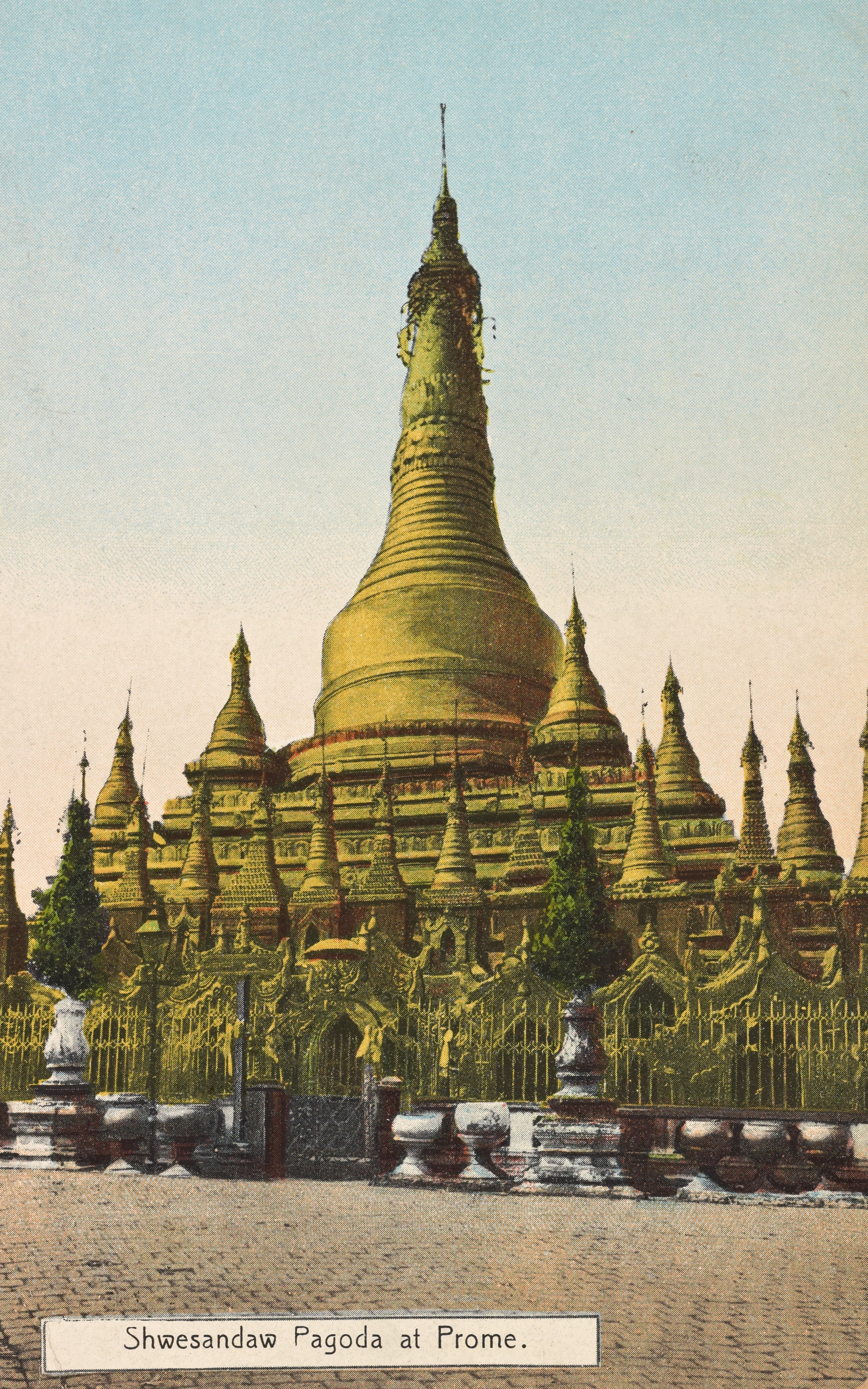
The Myathitin (Shwesandaw) Pagoda where the two kings signed the first treaty

=== Initial negotiations ===
The peace negotiations began c. 5 January 1403. Minkhaung sent a diplomatic mission across the river, carrying a letter addressed to Razadarit alongside gifts including two rare breed horses. In the letter, Minkhaung proposed a peace treaty if the "royal elder brother Razadarit" agreed to return all the occupied territories, and leave his kingdom. Razadarit, after glancing at Byat Za and Dein, gleaned from their taciturn demeanor that they wanted him to negotiate. He then dictated a letter addressed to the "royal younger brother Minkhaung" that he could not accept the offer as is. But he signaled his intention for further negotiations by sending lavish presents for Minkhaung.

After a series of diplomatic letters between the kings over the next few days, both kings agreed to let their ministers work out the details. The Ava delegation was led by Governor Thray Sithu of Myinsaing and the Hanthawaddy delegation by Byat Za. The two sides quickly reached agreement on the immediate issues of returning to the prewar border and the exchange of prisoners. However, Hanthawaddy's insistence on longer term security guarantees remained a sticking point. Pegu was concerned that Ava with its far greater resources could invade the southern kingdom in the future. The issue proved to be difficult to resolve. Both sides agreed to have the kings sign off on the initial agreed-upon points, and continue hold further discussions on the pending issues afterwards. To appease Hanthawaddy's security concerns, Minkhaung agreed to let Razadarit hold the Talezi fort until the arrival of the rainy season.

=== Treaty of Prome ===
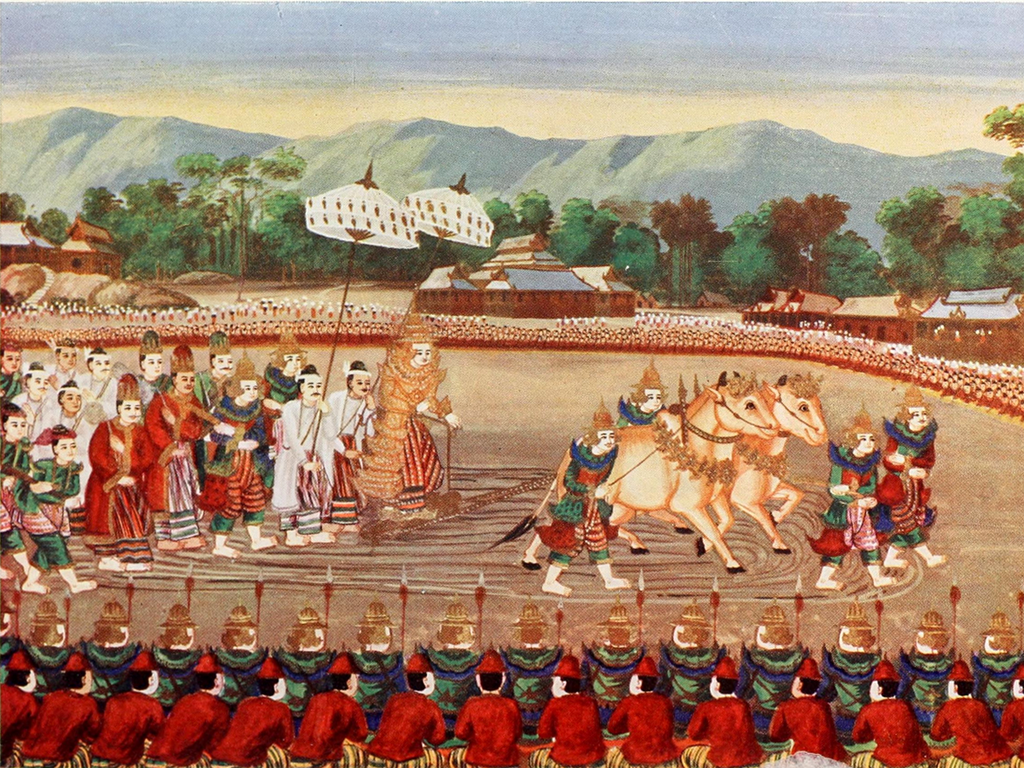
A Burmese painting depicting a monarch shielded by two royal white umbrellas

Circa February/March 1403, (Note: The Yazawin Thit cites a contemporary inscription founded by Governor Athinkhaya of Pagan which states that the two kings exchanged their umbrellas in 764 ME (30 March 1402 to 29 March 1403). This means the treaty was signed between the start of the negotiations (c. 5 January 1403) and the last day of 764 ME (29 March 1403). Furthermore since the initial negotiations went through many rounds, the treaty was probably signed in February or March.) Minkhaung and Razadarit met at the Myathitin Pagoda in Prome. On the premises of the pagoda, the two kings exchanged their respective htis (ထီးဖြူတော်; royal white umbrellas), and swore an oath covering the following points:

- The border shall run from Tabindayaung (တပင်တရောင်း) (Note: တပင်တရောင်း per the Hmannan Yazawin; တပင်တရောင် per the Maha Yazawin; and တပင်တရော် per the Yazawin Thit.) in the west to Hsabaga (ဆပကာ) in the east.
- North of the border shall belong to the Kingdom of Ava, and south of the border shall belong to the Kingdom of Hanthawaddy Pegu.
- Hanthawaddy may keep its armed forces at the Talezi fort until the arrival of the rainy season.

Prisoners of war were exchanged. The most prominent of them was Zeik-Bye, Razadarit's senior minister and father-in-law. Princess Tala Mi Kyaw was not part of the exchange because her status had become part of the further negotiations.

=== Treaty of Kawliya ===
The next round of negotiations were held at Kawliya, a small town outside Pegu. The Ava delegation was led by Chief Minister Min Yaza while Byat Za and Dein led the Hanthawaddy side. The main topic was about ensuring the peace for the long run. For the Hanthawaddy delegation, the answer was a marriage of state between Razadarit and Princess Thupaba Dewi, Minkhaung's younger sister. Razadarit had shared his concern with the two ministers that Ava with its superior resources could try to take over Pegu after "he was gone", and that it was important to establish blood relations with the ruling dynasty of Ava.

In the end, both sides reached agreement on the following:

- Minkhaung to sanction a marriage of state between Thupaba Dewi and Razadarit
- Razadarit to sanction Tala Mi Kyaw's status as a queen of Minkhaung
- Pegu to grant Ava the annual customs revenue of the port of Bassein, and 30 war elephants—annually

The terms were carried out soon after. Minkhaung sent his younger sister with a retinue of 30 ladies-in-waiting, and a guard force of seven regiments. An opulent marriage ceremony between Razadarit and Thupaba Dewi was held in Kawliya. After the ceremony, most of the Ava delegation and regiments returned but Min Yaza and a few diplomats went to Pegu to accompany the new queen of Hanthawaddy. Min Yaza returned to Ava only after having spent a total of five months in Pegu.

For his part, Razadarit began sending the annual customs revenues of the port of Bassein, and 30 war elephants. According to G.E. Harvey, Ava's desire for Bassein's port revenues, when considered alongside its constant fights to maintain control of its southernmost towns down to Tharrawaddy throughout the 15th century, suggests Ava's need to control the "trade along the Irrawaddy as far south as possible".

== Aftermath ==
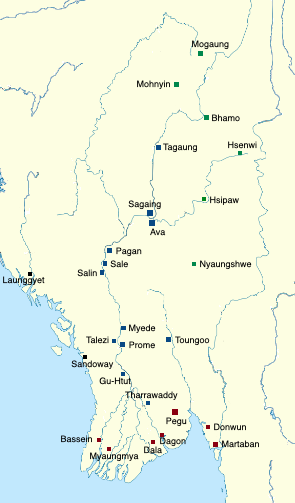
Ava went on to conquer Nyaungshwe, Hsipaw, Bhamo, Mohnyin and Arakan (Launggyet) between 1404 and 1406.

The friendly relations lasted only until 1406, and peace until 1408. The main issue was Ava's rapid expansion after the war. Despite his inability to organize a credible response for much of the war, Minkhaung benefited greatly from Razadarit's eventual retreat. The king of Ava had gained the confidence of his vassals, and he decided to use his newfound power immediately. By using diplomatic and military means, Minkhaung began acquiring eastern Shan states of Onbaung (1404/05), Yatsauk and Nyaungshwe (1405/06), and northern Maw/Mong Mao territories of Bhamo and Mohnyin in 1406.

The acquisitions alarmed Ava's neighbors. The Chinese Ming court, which considered the Shan states its tributaries, dispatched an embassy to Ava in August 1406, issuing a warning to end the "aggression". For Razadarit, the urgency was much higher. He had received intelligence that Ava was planning to invade the western kingdom of Arakan, and that Pegu would be next. Then Ava forces led by Minkhaung's son Minye Kyawswa captured Arakan in November 1406.

Razadarit removed the remaining veneer of friendly relations. He readily gave shelter to the Arakanese prince Min Khayi (or King Min Saw Mon), (Note: The chronicle Razadarit Ayedawbon says Razadarit took in Min Saw Mon but the Arakanese Rakhine Razawin Thit chronicle says it was Khayi, the brother of Min Saw Mon, that fled to Hanthawaddy; Min Saw Mon fled to Bengal.) and to Minkhaung's brother Prince Theiddat, who defected in 1407 after being passed over for crown prince. He also stopped sending the annual shipment of elephants and the annual customs revenues of the port of Bassein. The Hanthawaddy command expected Ava to invade in the following dry season. When it did not come—Minkhaung was suppressing a rebellion in Bhamo—Razadarit decided to seize the initiative while Ava had its hands full in the north. In March 1408, he sent an expeditionary force to drive out the Ava-installed king of Arakan, starting the Ava–Hanthawaddy War (1408–1418).

== Historiography ==
=== Chronicle coverages ===
"U Kala [the author of the Maha Yazawin] probably borrowed from the Yazadhiyaza Ayedawpon [Razadarit Ayedawbon] originally. Then when the Yazadhiyaza Ayedawpon was recopied later, after U Kala had written his work, it would turn around and borrow information from U Kala. Thus, a chronologically earlier text when recopied later would sometimes incorporate what the later text had written. So, a text that is considered earlier (such as the Yazadhiyaza Ayedawpon) is not necessarily the source of even an identical piece of information found in what is considered a later text (such as U Kala's) if we have only their copies to deal with."

— Michael Aung-Thwin

The war is covered extensively in several royal chronicles. The Razadarit Ayedawbon (c. 1560) is the earliest extant chronicle that reports on the war, and its coverage is from the perspective of Hanthawaddy Pegu. (Note: See (Aung-Thwin 2017: 250–253) and (Fernquest Spring 2006: 3–9) for the authors' use of the Razadarit Ayedawbon to provide coverage from Pegu's perspective.) The chronicle Maha Yazawin (1724) is the first chronicle that covers the war from Ava's perspective. (Note: See (Aung-Thwin 2017): "U Kala's perspective, from Upper Myanmar...", and (Fernquest Spring 2006): "the Burmese chronicle, which adds detail from Ava's Upper Burma perspective". U Kala's Mahayazawingyi, one of the first and most complete versions of the Burmese historical chronicle, will be used here (U Kala, 1961).")

The chronicle narratives have a few notable differences. The Razadarit provides far more detailed information on the Hanthawaddy orders of battle while the main chronicles—Maha Yazawin, Yazawin Thit (1798), and Hmannan Yazawin (1832)—do the same for the Ava side. The Razadarit does not mention the treaty of Kawliya whereas the Maha Yazawin and the Hmannan Yazawin do. The most visible differences, however, are with the dates—not only among the various chronicles but also among the several (at least nine) slightly different versions of the Razadarit itself. (Note: According to a 1968 analysis by Nai Pan Hla, nine slightly different versions of the Razadarit Ayedawbon were in publication, based in theory on one or more of the four oldest palm leaf manuscript copies, conjecturally dated to the mid 18th century.)

==== Inconsistent dates in versions of the Razadarit Ayedawbon ====
According to the historian Nai Pan Hla, the editor of the 1968 version of the Razadarit, the dating inconsistencies stemmed from copying/editing errors. Pan Hla stated that the "original palm-leaf manuscript" he used does not contain any specific year references except for the start of the war in 763 ME, and includes only the weekday, the day and the month but not the year for the date of the battle of Nawin. This caused some later copyists/editors to insert the year as 763 ME or 767 ME (Note: 767 ME may likely be a miscopying of 763 ME since the Burmese numeral ၃ (3) could be miscopied as the numeral ၇ (7).) for the date of the battle. (Note: Indeed, Pan Hla himself added 767 ME for the year of the battle of Nawin in a footnote, citing the Maha Yazawin.)

The following is a summary of the dates of the war as reported in a few versions of the Razadarit.

Event	Version 1 (Pan Hla 2005)	Version 2 (San Lwin/Fernquest Spring 2006)	Version 3 (Pan Hla 2005), Editors of (Maha Yazawin 2006), (Mi Mi Hlaing 2018)	Version 4 (Pan Hla 2005)
First invasion begins	Tuesday, 9th waxing of Nadaw 763 ME [Monday, 14 November 1401] (Note: (Pan Hla 2005): After Minkhaung ascended the throne in 763 ME (29 March 1401 to 29 March 1402), Razadarit invaded Ava on Tuesday, 9th waxing of Nadaw 756 ME (Tuesday, 1 December 1394). Per Pan Hla, the same typographical error of 756 ME is carried over in the Pak Lat, which gives the invasion date as Tuesday, 15th waxing of Nadaw 756 ME [Monday, 7 December 1394]. After correcting for 756 ME, Tuesday, 9th waxing of Nadaw 763 ME translates to Monday, 14 November 1401. If it was on a Tuesday, the date should be Tuesday, 15 November 1401.)	763 ME "c. 1401" [sic] (Note: (Fernquest Spring 2006), which references San Lwin's English translation of the chronicle, gives "763 BE" and "c. 1401".)	15th waxing of Nadaw 766 ME [sic] [Sunday, 16 November 1404] (Note: The version referenced by the editors of the 2006 edition of the Maha Yazawin gives 15th waxing of Nadaw 766 ME, (Sunday, 16 November 1404). Pan Hla also used this date.)	9th waxing of Nadaw 756 ME [sic] [Tuesday, 1 December 1394]
Battle of Sale; Last battle of the first invasion	After the new year had just turned [after 30 March 1402] (Note: Razadarit learned of the fall of Khaunglaunggya soon after the new year had turned [on 30 March 1402].)			
Second invasion begins	Three months before Tabodwe [764 ME] [c. September 1402] (Note: The manuscript used by Nai Pan Hla says Razadarit ordered the raising of troops for the next campaign soon after the new year had turned [on 30 March 1402]. His forces went on to lay siege to Prome for three months, until the siege was lifted on the 5th waxing of Tabodwe [28 December 1402]. This means the second campaign began three months earlier, in September 1402.)	[c. 763 ME] "c. 1401/02" (Note: The version by San Lwin as referenced in (Fernquest Spring 2006) apparently still keeps the second campaign in 763 ME (1401/02).)	767 ME [1405/06] (Note: The version referenced by the editors of the 2006 publication of the Maha Yazawin gives 767 ME.)	
Battle of Nawin	Tuesday, 5th waxing of Tabodwe [764 ME] [Thursday, 28 December 1402] (Note: The Burmese language manuscript used in (Pan Hla 2005) gives the date as Tuesday, the 5th waxing of Tabodwe—without specifying the year; the preceding narrative does state that the second campaign took place in the new year following the first campaign [i.e. 764 ME]. Furthermore, the 5th waxing of Tabodwe 764 ME translates to 28 December 1402, which was a Thursday, not Tuesday.)	Tuesday, 5th waxing of Tabodwe [763 ME] ["Tuesday, 4 January 1401" {sic}] (Note: San Lwin's version as referenced in (Fernquest Spring 2006) gives "Tuesday, the 5th day of the waxing moon in the month of Dabodwe" [763 ME], which (Fernquest Spring 2006) has mistranslated as 4 January 1401. (Tuesday, 5th waxing of Tabodwe 763 ME translates to Sunday, 8 January 1402.))	Tuesday, 5th waxing of Tabodwe 767 ME [Sunday, 24 January 1406] (Note: The version referenced by the editors of the 2006 edition of the Maha Yazawin states Tuesday, the 5th waxing of Tabodwe 767 ME, which they translated as 24 January 1406, which fell on a Sunday. (Hlaing 2018) gives the same translated date of [Sunday,] 24 January 1406.)	

Neither 763 ME nor 767 ME for the battle of Nawin is consistent with the Razadarit's own internal timeline. The 763 ME version does not explain why it has dated both dry season campaigns as 763 ME. While the 767 ME version does not have this problem—it has recalibrated the starting year to 766 ME—its starting date is inconsistent with its own narrative of the war starting soon after Minkhaung's accession in 763 ME [sic] (1401/02). (Note: See the footnotes by the editors of (Maha Yazawin Vol. 1 2006) for the start of the war. the battle of Nawin, and the peace treaty. See the same dates in a summarized version in (Hlaing 2018).)

==== Dates in later chronicles ====
Written some 160 years after the Razadarit, the Maha Yazawin (1724) has the war lasting between 766 and 767 ME. This suggests that the Maha Yazawin likely sourced its dates of the war from a 767 ME version of the Razadarit. (Note: To be sure, as per Michael Aung-Thwin, it is still possible that some later copies of the Razadarit may have actually copied some other narratives from the Maha Yazawin.) The Yazawin Thit (1798) rejects the Maha Yazawin's timeline, explicitly citing a contemporary inscription by Athinkhaya of Pagan, which says the war ended in 764 ME. (Note: As to when the kings signed the peace treaty, the Yazawin Thit cites a contemporary inscription by Athinkhaya of Pagan, which states that the war had ended in 764 ME after the king had exchanged hti (royal umbrellas) with King Razadarit of the South [akyay]. This means the kings had signed a treaty by 29 March 1403 (last day of 764 ME).) However, the Yazawin Thit has an inconsistency of its own: it has both starting and end dates in 764 ME, which is inconsistent with its own narrative of two dry season campaigns. (Note: The Yazawin Thit's date for the first invasion does not match its subsequent narrative. It says the invasion began in 764 ME (30 March 1402 to 28 March 1403). Then, it also states the negotiations of the first invasion with the abbot of Pinya began around the full moon day of Tabaung, indicating that the first campaign season was about to end. Furthermore, it also says the second dry season campaign began in 764 ME, and that the ceasefire negotiations began about 10 days after the battle of Nawin fought on Tuesday, 3rd waxing of Tabodwe 764 ME (Tuesday, 26 December 1402). Therefore, the invasion must have started a year earlier in 763 ME.) Despite the inscriptional evidence, the Hmannan Yazawin (1832) follows the Maha Yazawin's narrative.

Event	Maha Yazawin (1724)	Yazawin Thit (1798)	Hmannan Yazawin (1832)
First invasion begins	766 ME [c. late 1404]	764 ME [sic] [late 1402] [late 1401 (corrected)]	766 ME [c. late 1404]
Second invasion begins	767 ME [c. late 1405]	764 ME as rains receded [c. September 1402]	767 ME [c. late 1405]
Battle of Nawin	4–5 months into the campaign (Note: The battle took place about 4 to 5 months after the second dry season campaign began.) [c. January/February 1406, implied]	Tuesday, 3rd waxing of Tabodwe 764 ME [Tuesday, 26 December 1402]	4–5 months into the campaign (Note: The battle took place about 4 to 5 months after the second dry season campaign began.) [c. January/February 1406, implied]
Negotiations begin	Soon after the battle of Nawin	About ten days after the battle of Nawin.	Soon after the battle of Nawin
Treaty of Prome	same year [767 ME, implied] [by 29 March 1406]	764 ME [by 29 March 1403]	same year [767 ME, implied] [by 29 March 1406] (Note: Hmannan Yazawin does not explicitly say when the treaty was signed but it implies that it was still in 767 ME (30 March 1405 to 29 March 1406). The next page introduces 768 ME (30 March 1406 to 29 March 1407).)
Marriage of Thupaba Dewi and Razadarit	768 ME [c. mid 1406] (Note: After Chief Minister Min Yaza's negotiations, Princess Thupaba Dewi and Razadarit wedded in Pegu in 768 ME (30 March 1406 to 29 March 1407). In all, Min Yaza had spent about 5 months in Pegu.)	Not covered	768 ME [c. mid 1406] (Note: After Chief Minister Min Yaza's negotiations, Princess Thupaba Dewi and Razadarit wedded in Pegu in 768 ME (30 March 1406 to 29 March 1407). In all, Min Yaza had spent about 5 months in Pegu.)

However, the Maha Yazawin/Hmannan Yazawin dates are in conflict with their own dates for Ava's campaigns to the nearer Shan states and Arakan: 765–768 ME (1403/04–1406/07). The two chronicles do not explain the overlapping timelines. At any rate, their timeline for the Shan states acquisitions is likely to be closer to the truth as the Ming Chinese records corroborate Ava's acquisitions of Mohnyin and Bhamo by 1406.

Campaign	Maha Yazawin (1724)	Yazawin Thit (1798)	Hmannan Yazawin (1832)
Arakan	765 ME; 1403/04	765 ME; 1403/04	765 ME; 1403/04
Onbaung (Hsipaw)	765 ME; 1403/04	766 ME; 1404/05	765 ME; 1403/04
Yatsauk and Nyaungshwe	767 ME; 1405/06	767 ME; 1405/06	767 ME; 1405/06
Mohnyin	768 ME; 1406/07	768 ME; 1406/07	768 ME; 1406/07

=== Academic narratives ===
The war is covered in most English language works on Burmese history. Many academic works too contain their own dating consistency issues. (Harvey 1925) has the war lasting over two dry seasons but its starting and ending dates are both in 1406. (Note: (Harvey 1925) has the war starting in 1406, and ending two years later. Yet, it also has the final peace negotiations to be taking place in "Year 1406", citing Hmannan Yazawin.) (Fernquest Spring 2006) has the war starting "c. 1401", expanding into 1402, the main battle of Nawin being fought on 4 January 1401, and the final peace treaty being signed in 1406. (Aung-Thwin 2017) places the war between 1400 and 1403, following the Razadarit, (Note: Aung-Thwin referenced two versions of the Razadarit, a Burmese language version, and San Lwin's English translation.) but an earlier section mentions the second invasion being launched in 1405, following the Maha Yazawin.

Event	(Phayre 1883)	(Harvey 1925)	(Htin Aung 1967)	(Fernquest Spring 2006)	(Aung-Thwin 2017)
First invasion begins	after the rainy season of 1404	1406	[in or after 1401, implied]	c. 1401	after 1400
Second invasion begins	after the next rainy season [1405]	after the next rainy season [1407]	explicit date not mentioned	c. 1401/02	[between 1400 and 1403, implied], and 1405
Battle of Nawin	[1405 or 1406, implied]	[1407, implied]	explicit date not mentioned	4 January 1401 [sic]	not mentioned
War ends	1406	1406 and [1408, implied]	[in or before 1406, implied]	c. 1406	by 1403

== See also ==
- Orders of battle for the Ava–Hanthawaddy War (1401–1403)
- Forty Years' War

== Bibliography ==
- Aung-Thwin, Michael A. (2017). Myanmar in the Fifteenth Century. Honolulu: University of Hawai'i Press. ISBN 978-0-8248-6783-6.
- Aye Chan (2006). "Burma: Shan Domination in the Ava Period (c. AD 1310–1555)" (PDF). Journal of the Siam Society. 94.
- Fernquest, Jon (Spring 2006). "Rajadhirat's Mask of Command: Military Leadership in Burma (c. 1384–1421)" (PDF). SOAS Bulletin of Burma Research. 4 (1). Archived (PDF) from the original on 2020-03-22.
- Fernquest, Jon (Autumn 2006). "Crucible of War: Burma and the Ming in the Tai Frontier Zone (1382–1454)" (PDF). SOAS Bulletin of Burma Research. 4 (2). Archived (PDF) from the original on 2017-08-10.
- Harvey, G. E. (1925). History of Burma: From the Earliest Times to 10 March 1824. London: Frank Cass & Co. Ltd.
- Hlaing, Mi Mi (2018). "States of Hostilities in the First Ava Period". Mandalay University Research Journal. 9 (1). University of Mandalay.
- Htin Aung, Maung (1967). A History of Burma. New York and London: Cambridge University Press.
- Kala, U (2006) [1724]. Maha Yazawin (in Burmese). Vol. 1–3 (4th printing ed.). Yangon: Ya-Pyei Publishing.
- Maha Sithu (2012) [1798]. Myint Swe; Kyaw Win; Thein Hlaing (eds.). Yazawin Thit (in Burmese). Vol. 1–3 (2nd printing ed.). Yangon: Ya-Pyei Publishing.
- Pan Hla, Nai (2005) [1968]. Razadarit Ayedawbon (in Burmese) (8th printing ed.). Yangon: Armanthit Sarpay.
- Phayre, Arthur P. (1967) [1883]. History of Burma. London: Susil Gupta.
- Royal Historical Commission of Burma (2003) [1832]. Hmannan Yazawin (in Burmese). Vol. 1–3. Yangon: Ministry of Information, Myanmar.
- Sandamala Linkara, Ashin (1997–1999) [1931]. Rakhine Razawin Thit (in Burmese). Vol. 1–2. Yangon: Tetlan Sarpay.
- Than Tun (December 1959). "History of Burma: A.D. 1300–1400". Journal of Burma Research Society. XLII (II).
