= Sagyo Thu-Myat =

Shin Zawtayanta; ရှင်ဇောတယန္တ
- Title: Sagyo Thu-Myat; စကြို သူမြတ်

Personal life
- Born: c. 1373 c. 735 ME Yesagyo, Ava Kingdom
- Died: c. 1448/49 c. 810 ME Pinya, Ava Kingdom
- Education: Shin Pinswegyo Monastery, Sale; Kassapa Monastery, Pinya
- Occupation: Buddhist monk

Religious life
- Religion: Buddhism
- School: Theravada
- Dharma name: Jotayanta

Senior posting
- Based in: Pinya

Shin Zawtayanta (Burmese: ရှင် ဇောတယန္တ, [ʃɪ̀ɰ̃ zɔ́da̰jàɰ̃da̰]; c. 1373–c. 1448/49) was a Burmese Buddhist monk and writer, active in the early 15th century Ava period. He is better known by his religious title Sagyo Thu-Myat (စကြို သူမြတ်, [zədʑò ðùmjaʔ]; lit. 'The Venerable Abbot of the Sagyo [Monastery]'). (Note: Chronicles report various versions of his title.: the Razadarit Ayedawbon (c. 1560) calls him "ပင်းယ သူကြို", lit. '[Abbot of] the Sagyo [Monastery], Pinya'.; The Maha Yazawin (1724) and Hmannan Yazawin (1832) chronicles spell his title as "စကြို သူမြတ်".; The Yazawin Thit (1798) calls him "စကြော သူမြတ်".; The Pak Lat reports his Mon language title as "ဗင်ယ သဂြော", lit. '[Abbot of] the Sagyo [Monastery], Pinya'.)

The monk is best known in Burmese history for successfully persuading King Razadarit of Hanthawaddy to withdraw from Ava during the Ava–Hanthawaddy War (1401–1403), and for pushing through the recalibration of the Burmese calendar in 1438. He was also a pioneer of the religious literary genre of myitta-za, which were letters of friendly exhortations or admonishments for the laity, particularly the royalty.

== Early life and education ==
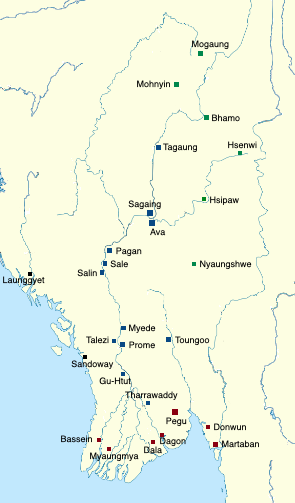
Zawtayanta was educated in Sale, before moving to Pinya, near Ava.

The future monk was born c. 1373 (Note: His exact birth date is not known. Chronicles suggest he was born c. 1372 or 1374.: The Maha Yazawin (1724) and Hmannan Yazawin (1832) chronicles say he was in his 31st year (at age 30) in late 766 ME (early 1405), having been an ordained monk for 11 years, meaning he was born c. late 735 ME (early 1374) or early to mid 736 ME (mid to late 1374).; The Yazawin Thit (1798) however says he was in his 30th year (aged 29), with 11 years as an ordained monk, in Tabaung 763 ME (February 1402), meaning he was born c. very late 733 ME (c. March 1372), or early to mid 734 ME (mid to late 1372 and early 1373).; A modern writer, Hpone Nwe, gives the monk's birth year as 735 ME (29 March 1373 to 28 March 1374). It is not clear where he got the information, however.) in Yesagyo, a small rural town south of Pagan (Bagan), in the Kingdom of Ava. He was educated at the Shin Pinswegyo Monastery (ရှင်ပင်စွယ်ကြို ကျောင်း) in nearby Sale (Salay), and studied under the head abbot of the monastic school, Shin Maha-Yatha (Pali: Mahāyasa). Circa 1391, he joined the monastic order with the dhamma title of Zawtayanta (Pali: Jotayanta).

By 1401, Zawtayanta had moved to Pinya, next to the capital Ava (Inwa), to further his religious education. He was invited there by Gov. Thado of Myohla, who was one of his lay disciples, as well as a protege of King Minkhaung I (r. 1400–1421). The monk resided and studied at the Kassapa Monastery (ကဿပ ကျောင်း), founded by another Minkhaung protege, Yazathingyan. At Pinya, he became known for his deep knowledge of the Tipiṭaka (Theravada Buddhist scriptures), and horoscopes as well as his incisive and eloquent sermons and writings.

== Wartime mediator ==
The small town monk was thrusted into the national limelight in early 1402. At the time, Hanthawaddy forces led by King Razadarit had advanced to the gates of Ava since late 1401. The young monk was selected by the Ava court to be the mediator to end the stalemate because of his ability to speak and write clearly and eloquently with arguments based on the scriptures. His assignment was to persuade Razadarit to withdraw peacefully.

Zawtayanta accepted the assignment. He wrote a letter to Razadarit, asking to see the king at his camp, ostensibly to deliver a sermon. His letter was well received by the Hanthawaddy command, which too was looking for a face-saving way out. Razadarit personally invited him.

=== Sermon at the Hanthawaddy camp ===
In mid-February 1402, (Note: Full moon of Tabaung 763 ME (16 February 1402)) Zawtayanta led a 300-member Ava delegation to the Hanthawaddy camp near the Shwe Kyet-Yet Pagoda (in present-day Amarapura), about 15 kilometres (9.3 mi) north of Ava. His retinue of 300 men brought several gifts for Razadarit from Minkhaung. The meeting took place on Razadarit's royal barge Karaweik.

My goals for this campaign are to:

1. Avenge King Swa's invasions of Hanthawaddy that caused so much death and destruction in my country,
2. Incorporate the Kingdom of Ava into my realm,
3. Visit the famous religious sites, and perform meritorious deeds there to further the sasana, and
4. Be remembered as a great conqueror in history.

— Razadarit's answer to Zawtayanta's inquiry into the goals of the campaign (Note: The four reasons per the Razadarit Ayedawbon. The Maha Yazawin and Hmannan Yazawin do not include "to avenge King Swa's invasions".)

The meeting did not start out well. Zawtayanta first inquired why Razadarit had come to the upcountry. When the king gave his four reasons, the monk tried to persuade the king that he had already accomplished most of the goals. He told Razadarit that King Swa had already died; that Razadarit had already visited many religious sites in the upcountry unimpeded; and that the king was already known for his military prowess. But the monk strongly hinted that Razadarit would not be able to conquer Ava by painstakingly enumerating all 53 walled cities he claimed were loyal to Minkhaung. He further pointed out that the rainy season was fast approaching, and the Hanthawaddy king should perhaps be concerned about his home provinces revolting during this long campaign. It did not work. Razadarit is said to have replied with a polite smile that he "the king of kings" and his senior staff did not need to be lectured about military strategy by a monk, and that he was prepared to meet Ava forces militarily.

Zawtayanta quickly changed tactics by delivering his prepared sermon. The lengthy sermon, covered in detail in the royal chronicles, preached various Buddhist doctrines, and included several back-and-forth dialogues between the king and the monk. According to historians, his sermon about the "wickedness of war", and the "sin of bloodshed" was nothing groundbreaking; the concepts would have been "more or less common knowledge among Buddhists". However, the preachings perfectly suited Razadarit, who was looking for a "pretence" to withdraw, after "seeing the light". At any rate, Razadarit announced after the sermon that he had indeed come to conquer the upcountry but now that he had a better understanding of the dhamma, he would return home as soon as his naval patrols from the upriver arrived back to the base.

=== Consecrating Razadarit's constructions ===
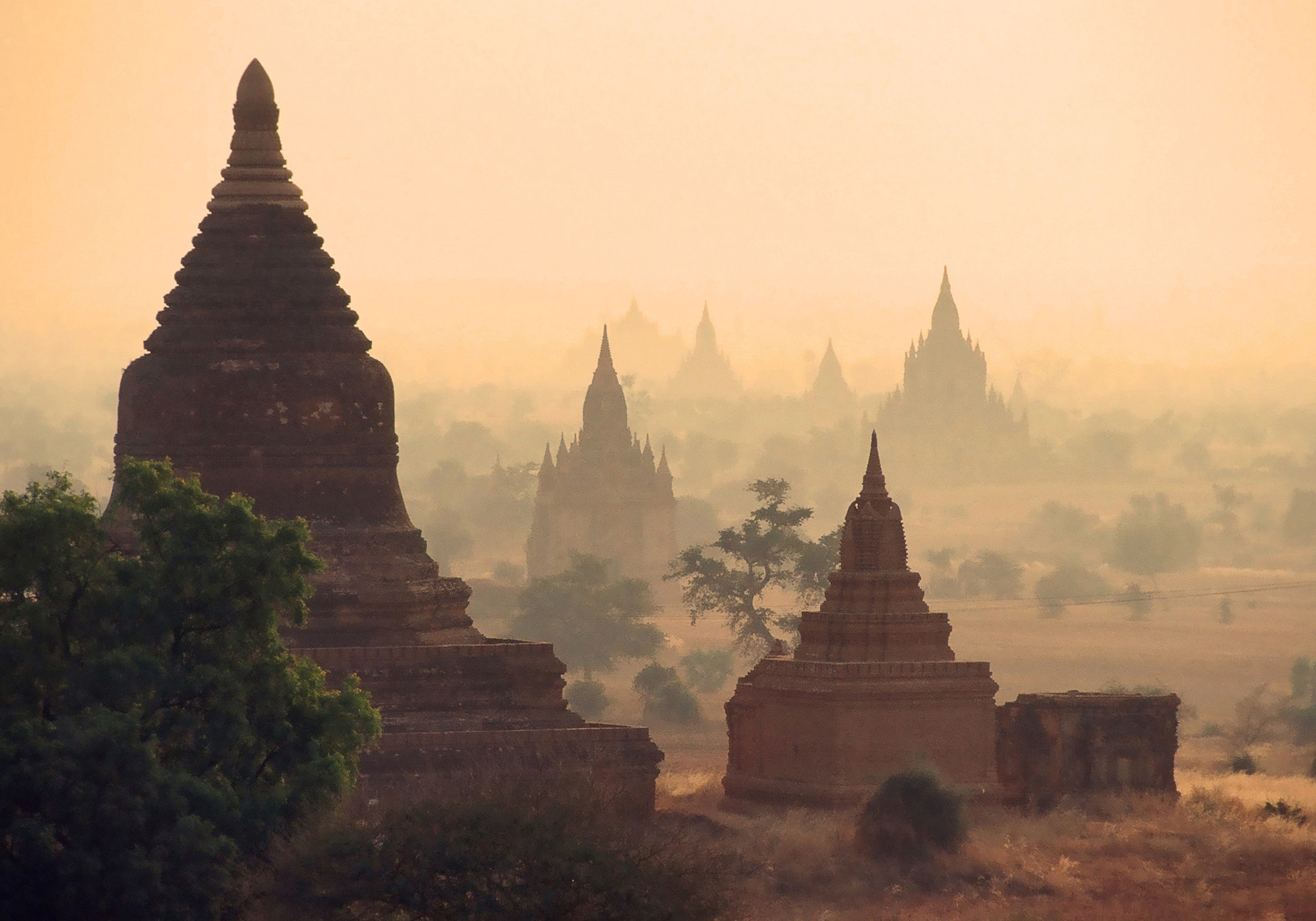
Pagan (Bagan) at dawn, present day, where Razadarit constructed a monastery and donated it to Shin Zawtayanta

Zawtayanta remained by Razadarit for about another month and a half to help fulfill Razadarit's parting wishes. As part of his withdrawal announcement, Razadarit vowed to leave the markers of his power in the upcountry by constructing religious buildings. He was following "the practice of earlier Pagan kings, who built temples they could roam at will, rationalized by the notion of dharmavijaya, or righteous conquest."

The monk agreed to consecrate the king's planned projects. The first building was a zayat (pavilion) on the premises of the Shwe Kyet-Yet Pagoda, using the logs from five of Razadarit's royal barges. When the construction was complete five days later, the monk presided over the dedication ceremony. The Hanthawaddy navy's withdrawal began afterwards. The monk remained by Razadarit's side as Razadarit had asked him to accompany him to the former royal capital of Pagan (Bagan). He had to calm down Razadarit when Ava forces burned down the newly built zayat soon after. Zawtayanta as well as Razadarit's senior ministers Byat Za and Dein Mani-Yut had to persuade the king to rescind the order to turn back, stating that "demerits accrue to the one who set fire to a good deed".

The second project was located in Pagan. To fulfill one of his lifelong goals, the Hanthawaddy king ordered the construction of a monastery outside the former royal capital. Ava forces inside the fortified city did not disturb the enemy. After the construction was complete, the king donated the monastery to Zawtayanta. The Hanthawaddy forces then sailed down.

== Recalibration of the Burmese calendar ==
Shin Zawtayanta is also remembered for his role in the recalibration of the Burmese calendar in 1438. By then he had become an eminence grise, known by the title of Sagyo Thu-Myat (စကြို သူမြတ်, lit. 'the Venerable Abbot of the Sagyo [Monastery]'), with access to the king and the court. Indeed, the king at the time was Thado, the small town governor who first invited him to Pinya nearly four decades earlier. In 1437, Thado asked the Ava court as to how to deal with the deep political troubles the kingdom was facing. The king also consulted Zawtayanta because the monk was known for his deep expertise in horoscopes. Zawtayanta along with another senior monk known by the title of "Min Kyaung Thu-Myat" (မင်းကျောင်း သူမြတ်, lit. 'the Venerable Abbot of the Min Monastery') proposed that the kingdom's troubles needed to be addressed by recalibrating the Burmese calendar to year 2 (not year 0) when it reached the year 800 ME (in 1438 CE).

The king accepted the proposal over the objections of Chief Minister Yazathingyan. The king announced on the eleventh anniversary of his coronation, on 18 May 1437, (Note: Full moon of Nayon 799 ME, 18 May 1437) that the calendar would reset to year two on the next New Year's Day (30 March 1438). The court carried out the recalibration as announced.

== Legacy ==
His two notable projects profiled in the chronicles left little long-term imprint. His 1402 diplomatic mission did get Razadarit to leave the upcountry but the peace broke down just a few days after Razadarit left Zawtayanta at Pagan. Nor did the recalibrated calendar succeed. The new era, colloquially known as Thekkarit To (သက္ကရာဇ် တို, "Short Era"), never gained popular use. The Ava court did continue to use Thekkarit To alongside the existing era at least until 1496/97 in the reign of King Minkhaung II (r. 1480–1501). (Note: See (Yazawin Thit Vol. 1 2012: 282–307) for the side-by-side use of the two eras. The last instance of dual use was 858 ME, 60 Short Era (1496/97).)

However, his initial letter to Razadarit did become a model for the genre of myitta-za (မေတ္တာစာ, lit. 'letters in the spirit of metta'), which were letters of friendly exhortations or admonishments for the laypeople, in particular, the royalty. The myitta-za later developed into "the most common medium of literary communication" aiming to achieve "the highest utility value" for the laity.

== Bibliography ==
- Aung Moe (31 August 1987). "Early Ava Period Writers: Sagyo Thu Myat". The Working People's Daily. Yangon.
- Aung-Thwin, Michael A. (2017). Myanmar in the Fifteenth Century. Honolulu: University of Hawai'i Press. ISBN 978-0-8248-6783-6.
- Aung Tun, Sai (2009). History of the Shan State: From Its Origins to 1962. Chiang Mai: Silk Worm Books. ISBN 978-974-9511-43-5.
- Fernquest, Jon (Spring 2006). "Rajadhirat's Mask of Command: Military Leadership in Burma (c. 1384–1421)" (PDF). SOAS Bulletin of Burma Research. 4 (1). Archived (PDF) from the original on 2020-03-22.
- Harvey, G. E. (1925). History of Burma: From the Earliest Times to 10 March 1824. London: Frank Cass & Co. Ltd.
- Hlaing, Mi Mi (2018). "States of Hostilities in the First Ava Period". Mandalay University Research Journal. 9 (1). University of Mandalay.
- Hpone Nwe (c. 2000). "Sagyo Thu-Myat". ရဟန်းစာဆိုတော်များ အတ္ထုပ္ပတ္တိ [Biographies of Monk Scholars]. Yangon. pp. 19–21.
- Htin Aung, Maung (1967). A History of Burma. New York and London: Cambridge University Press.
- Kala, U (2006) [1724]. Maha Yazawin (in Burmese). Vol. 1–3 (4th printing ed.). Yangon: Ya-Pyei Publishing.
- Maha Sithu (2012) [1798]. Myint Swe; Kyaw Win; Thein Hlaing (eds.). Yazawin Thit (in Burmese). Vol. 1–3 (2nd printing ed.). Yangon: Ya-Pyei Publishing.
- Pan Hla, Nai (2005) [1968]. Razadarit Ayedawbon (in Burmese) (8th printing ed.). Yangon: Armanthit Sarpay.
- Phayre, Arthur P. (1967) [1883]. History of Burma. London: Susil Gupta.
- Royal Historical Commission of Burma (2003) [1832]. Hmannan Yazawin (in Burmese). Vol. 1–3. Yangon: Ministry of Information, Myanmar.
