= Tala Mi Kyaw =

Tala Mi Kyaw; တလမည်ကျော်

Queen Consort of Ava
- Reign: 1402–1421?
- Born: c. mid-to-late 1380s Hanthawaddy kingdom
- Died: ? Ava Kingdom
- Spouse: Saw Maha-Rit (by 1401–1402); Minkhaung I (1402–1421?)
- Father: Razadarit
- Mother: ?
- Religion: Theravada Buddhism

Tala Mi Kyaw (Mon: တလမေဏင်ကေဲ; Burmese: တလမည်ကျော် or တလမဲကြိုး (Note: Her Mon language name တလမေဏင်ကေဲ has been translated into Burmese as တလမည်ကျော် (Tala Mi Kyaw, [təlɑ̯ mì dʑɔ̀]) in the Razadarit Ayedawbon, and the Yazawin Thit chronicles, and တလမဲကြိုး (Tala Me Kyo, [təlɑ̯ mɛ́ dʑó]) in the Maha Yazawin and Hmannan Yazawin chronicles. A modern translation by Nai Pan Hla is တလမေကျော် (Tala May Kyaw, [təlɑ̯ mè dʑó]).)) was a Hanthawaddy princess who became a queen consort of King Minkhaung I of Ava during the Ava–Hanthawaddy War (1401–1403). Captured by Ava forces in 1402, the princess became part of the two marriages of state agreed to in the peace treaty of 1403 that formally ended the war. In accordance with the treaty, her father King Razadarit sanctioned her marriage to King Minkhaung; in return, Minkhaung sent his younger sister Princess Thupaba Dewi in marriage to Razadarit.

== Early life ==
The royal chronicles provide no background information about the princess except that she was a daughter of King Razadarit (r. 1384–1421). They do not explicitly state who her mother was, or when she was born. (Note: It can be inferred from chronicle reporting that she was probably born in the mid-to-late 1380s. According to the Razadarit Ayedawbon chronicle, Prince Binnya Nwe [King Razadarit] took his first wives, Princess Tala Mi Daw and Mwei Maneit in 1383, and got his very first child, Bawlawkyantaw by Tala Mi Daw, in late 1383. Therefore, Razadarit's other children must have been born in or after 1384. Furthermore, because Tala Mi Kyaw was already married by 1401, she was probably not born in the 1390s.) In all, she was one of the three daughters of the king reported in the chronicles. (Note: None of the chronicles reports a complete list of children by King Razadarit. The other two daughters reported in the chronicles are: Tala Mi Saw and Shin Saw Pu.) By 1401, she was already married to her cousin Saw Maha-Rit.

== Road to Ava ==
In November 1401, Princess Kyaw accompanied her father and her husband in her father's invasion of Ava. When the invasion forces split up near Prome (Pyay), she went with her husband's army, charged with taking the city while her father and his naval flotilla sailed up the Irrawaddy River. For the next four plus months, while the army laid siege to the fortified city, the princess remained by her husband's side at the army headquarters at nearby Khaunglaunggya (ခေါင်းလောင်းကျ). However, she became a prisoner of war when Ava forces took Khaunglaunggya after a surprise counterattack in March/April 1402. (Note: Razadarit received the news of the fall of Khaunglaunggya soon after the new year had turned [on 30 March 1402].) Her husband managed to escape by himself on horseback. Her capture greatly shocked and angered Razadarit. The king immediately withdrew from the front, and had Saw Maha-Rit executed for having left her behind.

Meanwhile, the princess was sent to Ava, and presented to King Minkhaung I. According to the main chronicles, she became a junior queen of the king. (Note: The Maha Yazawin, Yazawin Thit, and Hmannan Yazawin say she was presented to King Minkhaung. The chronicles however do not list her as a senior queen (nan mibaya) or a child-bearing consort.) However, the Razadarit Ayedawbon, which narrates from the Hanthawaddy perspective, says Minkhaung gave her in marriage to his middle son Prince Thihathu. The Yazawin Thit chronicle rejects the Razadarit Ayedawbon's narrative, pointing out that Thihathu was only six years old at the time. (Note: The prince was in his 7th year (6 years old) at the time of Tala Mi Kyaw's capture, according to the Yazawin Thit. Per the Zatadawbon Yazawin chronicle, the prince was born c. 3 June 1394, meaning he would have been in his 8th year (7 years old) in April 1402.) Historians G.E. Harvey and Htin Aung follow the main chronicles' narrative that she became a queen of Minkhaung.

== Formalization of her status ==
Her capture extended the war to the following dry season. Vowing to avenge for his daughter, Razadarit invaded the upcountry again as the rainy season ended. However, the campaign went nowhere for four months, and peace negotiations began in January 1403.

In the end, her status proved to be a small part of the larger negotiations. Razadarit agreed to let his daughter remain "by the side of the king of the golden palace [Minkhaung]" but in return insisted on a reciprocal marriage of state between him and Minkhaung's younger sister Thupaba Dewi. The proposed marriage became a requirement before Razadarit would agree to granting the annual custom revenues of Bassein to Ava. After five months of negotiations, Minkhaung relented, and sent his sister to Pegu in marriage to Razadarit.

== Aftermath ==
In all, the princess was the first of the four Hanthawaddy royal family members to be resettled in Ava during the Forty Years' War. (The peace did not last; the war resumed in 1408.) Her brother-in-law Gen. Smin Bayan, husband of Princess Tala Mi Saw, was captured in battle in 1414 before he formally defected to the Ava side in 1415. Her half-brother Binnya Set of Dagon too was captured in battle in 1418, and resettled in Ava, befitting a prince. Her half-sister Princess Shin Saw Pu came to Ava to be a senior queen (nan mibaya) of King Thihathu of Ava as part of the peace treaty of 1423 that ended the Ava–Hanthawaddy War (1422–1423).

At any rate, the 1403 negotiations were the last mention of Princess Tala Mi Kyaw in the chronicles. She apparently never rose to be a senior queen, or had any children with Minkhaung. (Note: She is not listed as a senior queen or a child-bearing consort of King Minkhaung in the main chronicles. See (Maha Yazawin Vol. 1 2006: 307), (Yazawin Thit Vol. 1 2012: 265), (Hmannan Vol. 1 2003: 440–441).) Nor did she return to her home kingdom either; of the four royals, only Gen. Bayan and Queen Pu are reported to have managed to return to Pegu. (Note: Bayan fled to Pegu in 1423. Pu fled to Pegu in 1429.)

== Bibliography ==
- Fernquest, Jon (Spring 2006). "Rajadhirat's Mask of Command: Military Leadership in Burma (c. 1384–1421)" (PDF). SBBR. 4 (1). Archived from the original on 19 February 2009.
- Harvey, G.E. (1925). History of Burma: From the Earliest Times to 10 March 1824. London: Frank Cass & Co. Ltd.
- Htin Aung, Maung (1967). A History of Burma. New York and London: Cambridge University Press.
- Kala, U (2006) [1724]. Maha Yazawin (in Burmese). Vol. 1–3 (4th printing ed.). Yangon: Ya-Pyei Publishing.
- Maha Sithu (2012) [1798]. Kyaw Win; Thein Hlaing (eds.). Yazawin Thit (in Burmese). Vol. 1–3 (2nd ed.). Yangon: Ya-Pyei Publishing.
- Pan Hla, Nai (2005) [1968]. Razadarit Ayedawbon (in Burmese) (8th ed.). Yangon: Armanthit Sarpay.
- Royal Historians of Burma (1960) [c. 1680]. U Hla Tin (Hla Thamein) (ed.). Zatadawbon Yazawin. Historical Research Directorate of the Union of Burma.
- Royal Historical Commission of Burma (2003) [1832]. Hmannan Yazawin (in Burmese). Vol. 1–3. Yangon: Ministry of Information, Myanmar.
