= Smin Bya Paik =

Smin Bya Paik သမိန် ဗြပိုက်
- သၟိင် ဗြထဗိုက်
- Born: Unknown; Martaban–Hanthawaddy Kingdom
- Died: 26 December 1402; Tuesday, 3rd waxing of Tabodwe 764 ME; Nawin, Prome District, Ava Kingdom
- Military career
- Allegiance: Royal Hanthawaddy Armed Forces
- Service years: by 1390–1402
- Rank: Commander
- Conflicts: Ava–Hanthawaddy War (1385–1391); Ava–Hanthawaddy War (1401–1403)

Smin Bya Paik (Burmese: သမိန် ဗြပိုက်; Burmese pronunciation: [θəmèiɴ bjaʔ baiʔ]; also Byat-Hta-Baik, Mon: သၟိင် ဗြထဗိုက်,; d. 1402) was a Hanthawaddy military commander who served in the first two Ava–Hanthawaddy wars. He died in action in 1402.

== Brief ==
Paik served as a naval squadron commander in the battle of Gu-Htut (1390–1391) in the First Ava–Hanthawaddy War. He was a member of the four Hanthawaddy delegation that met with King Swa Saw Ke of Ava and successfully negotiated a peace treaty to end the war.

He again served as a naval commander of a rearguard flotilla in Hanthawaddy's invasion of Ava in 1401. Even when the tide of war turned against Hanthawaddy in 1402, he remained part of the faction led by Minister-General Zeik-Bye. Their faction, which also included Baw Kyaw, advocated for the continued siege of Prome (Pyay) while co-chief ministers Byat Za and Dein Mani-Yut favored withdrawing from the Prome front altogether. The king agreed with Zeik-Bye, and posted Zeik-Bye, Baw Kyaw and Bya Paik to defend the Nawin fort, which guarded the northerly route to Prome.

It turned out that they were severely outnumbered by the Ava forces led by King Minkhaung I himself. On the morning of 26 December 1402, (Note: (Yazawin Thit Vol. 1 2012: 220): Tuesday, 3rd waxing of Tabodwe 764 ME = 26 December 1402) the fort fell. Paik and Baw Kyaw both fell in action while Zeik-Bye was captured.

== Bibliography ==
- Kala, U (2006) [1724]. Maha Yazawin (in Burmese). Vol. 1–3 (4th printing ed.). Yangon: Ya-Pyei Publishing.
- Maha Sithu (2012) [1798]. Myint Swe; Kyaw Win; Thein Hlaing (eds.). Yazawin Thit (in Burmese). Vol. 1–3 (2nd printing ed.). Yangon: Ya-Pyei Publishing.
- Pan Hla, Nai (2005) [1968]. Razadarit Ayedawbon (in Burmese) (8th printing ed.). Yangon: Armanthit Sarpay.
- Royal Historical Commission of Burma (2003) [1832]. Hmannan Yazawin (in Burmese). Vol. 1–3. Yangon: Ministry of Information, Myanmar.
