= Saw Maha-Rit =

Burmese military leader

Saw Maha-Rit; စောမဟာရာဇ်
- Born: c. 1380s (Note: His grandparents Binnya Thein and Tala Mi Saw were married only in the reign of King Binnya U (r. 1348–1384).); Hanthawaddy kingdom
- Died: c. April 1402; Dala-Twante, Hanthawaddy Kingdom
- Spouse: Tala Mi Kyaw
- Mother: Tala Hnin Thiri

Saw Maha-Rit (Burmese: စောမဟာရာဇ်, (Note: The Razadarit Ayedawbon calls him စော မဟာရာဇ် (Saw Maha-Rit). The Maha Yazawin and Hmannan Yazawin chronicles identify him as မဟာရတ် (Maha-Rat). The Yazawin Thit calls him စောမရှက် (Saw Ma-Shet).) Burmese pronunciation: [sɔ́ məhà ɹɪ̀ʔ]; d. 1402) was a Hanthawaddy royal and a military commander. A son-in-law of King Razadarit, Maha-Rit led the first siege of Prome (Pyay) during the Second Ava–Hanthawaddy War. He was executed for leaving behind his wife Princess Tala Mi Kyaw at the battle scene.

== Background ==
According to the Razadarit Ayedawbon chronicle, Maha-Rit was the elder son of Princess Tala Hnin Thiri. Through his mother, he was a great-grandson of King Saw Zein (r. 1323–1330) and a grandson of Binnya Thein, a former Lan Na court minister who later served as a senior minister under successive Hanthawaddy kings from Saw Zein to Binnya U. Furthermore, his mother was a first cousin of King Razadarit (r. 1384–1421). His personal name was Bauk Kan Baru (ဗောက်ကန်ဗရူး), and he had one younger brother Baw Chi (ဘောချီ), who later became governor of Lagunbyi with the titles of Byattaba and Einkama.

Baru's ties to the royal family were further reinforced in 1392 when all three of his maternal aunts (Yaza Dewi, Lawka Dewi, and Thiri Maya Dewi) became queens of King Razadarit. By 1401, he himself was married to his second cousin Princess Tala Mi Kyaw, one of Razadarit's daughters, and was now known by the title, Saw Maha-Rit.

== Siege of Prome (1401–1402) ==
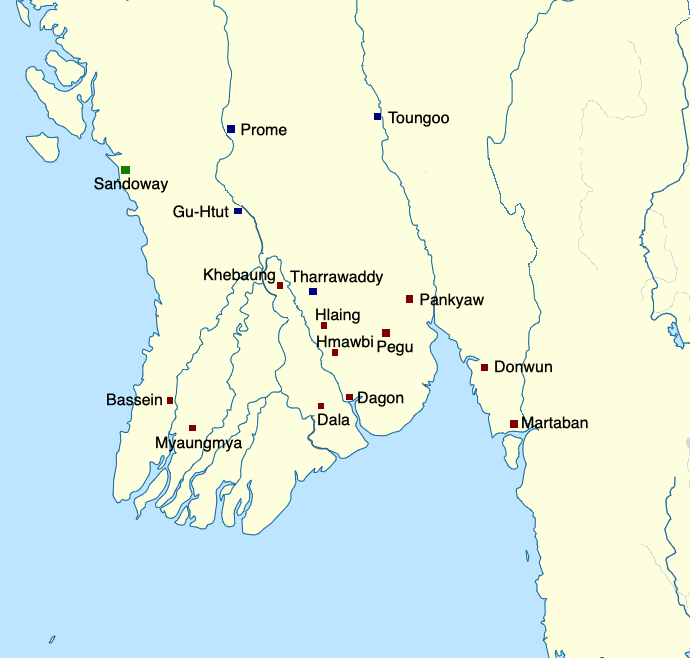
Map of Lower Burma in the early 15th century

Maha-Rit is best remembered in Burmese history for his failed siege of Prome (Pyay) during the first dry season of the Second Ava–Hanthawaddy War. In late 1401, he was given command of an army to take Prome, Ava's main garrison in Ava's south, by King Razadarit himself. While Razadarit continued with his invasion of the upcountry, Maha-Rit laid siege to the heavily fortified city. Meanwhile, his wife came to join him at his main headquarters at a place called Khaunglaunggya, outside Prome.

The siege lasted until March/April 1402; (Note: Razadarit received the news of the fall of Khaunglaunggya soon after the new year had turned [on 30 March 1402].) by then, the tide of war had turned. Razadarit, who had blockaded the royal capital of Ava (Inwa) with his naval armada, had begun an orderly withdrawal down the Irrawaddy River. It was then that coordinated Ava counterattacks attempted to lift the siege. Maha-Rit's army at Khaunglaunggya came under attack from a regiment led by Gov. Nawrahta of Salin from the outside and from Gov. Letya Pyanchi of Prome's forces from inside the perimeter. Totally surprised by the attacks, Maha-Rit barely escaped on horseback, leaving behind his wife and his troops. Ava forces lifted siege, and sent the captured princess to King Minkhaung I in Ava.

== Death ==
Maha-Rit awaited the return of Razadarit's forces from Dala (modern Twante–Dala). The news of the fall of Khaunglaunggya, and the loss of the princess reached Razadarit only a few days later when the king was still directing a raid of Sale, some 300 km north of Prome. When he received the news, a furious king ordered an immediate full withdrawal, and sailed down to his country. Throughout the journey, according to the Razadarit Ayedawbon chronicle, the king was "burning with anger" for Maha-Rit fleeing the scene, and leaving his daughter behind, and responded little to his staff, as though he had "poison in his mouth". Upon arriving at Dala, Razadarit summarily ordered Maha-Rit's execution by cutting him up into pieces. The pleas for clemency by the monks had little effect. The king only slightly changed the order to cut off only the limbs before drowning him.

Maha-Rit's gruesome death did little to placate the king. To avenge for his daughter's abduction, Razadarit launched another invasion later in the year.

== Ancestry ==
The following is Maha-Rit's ancestry as given in the Razadarit Ayedawbon chronicle. (Note: Maha-Rit's maternal grandfather was Binnya Thein, a former official of the Lan Na court, who fled Chiang Mai after a disagreement with the king of Lan Na, also titled Saw Maha-Rit, in the 1320s. During King Binnya U's reign, Thein married Zein's daughter (U's half-sister) Tala Saw Lun. The union produced a son (Saw Ye-Bein) and a daughter (Mwei A-Khin-Lei), also known by her title Tala Hnin Thiri.)

Ancestry of Saw Maha-Rit

8. unnamed
4.
9. unnamed
2. unnamed
10. unnamed
5.
11. unnamed
1. Saw Maha-Rit
12. unnamed
6. Binnya Thein of Chiang Mai
13. unnamed
3. Tala Hnin Thiri
14. King Saw Zein
7. Tala Saw Lun
15. unnamed

== Bibliography ==
- Fernquest, Jon (Spring 2006). "Rajadhirat's Mask of Command: Military Leadership in Burma (c. 1384–1421)" (PDF). SBBR. 4 (1). Archived from the original (PDF) on 19 February 2009.
- Harvey, G. E. (1925). History of Burma: From the Earliest Times to 10 March 1824. London: Frank Cass & Co. Ltd.
- Kala, U (2006) [1724]. Maha Yazawin (in Burmese). Vol. 1–3 (4th printing ed.). Yangon: Ya-Pyei Publishing.
- Pan Hla, Nai (2005) [1968]. Razadarit Ayedawbon (in Burmese) (8th printing ed.). Yangon: Armanthit Sarpay.
- Royal Historical Commission of Burma (2003) [1832]. Hmannan Yazawin (in Burmese). Vol. 1–3. Yangon: Ministry of Information, Myanmar.
