= Shwesandaw Pagoda (Pyay) =

Prominent Buddhist Pagoda in Pyay, Myanmar

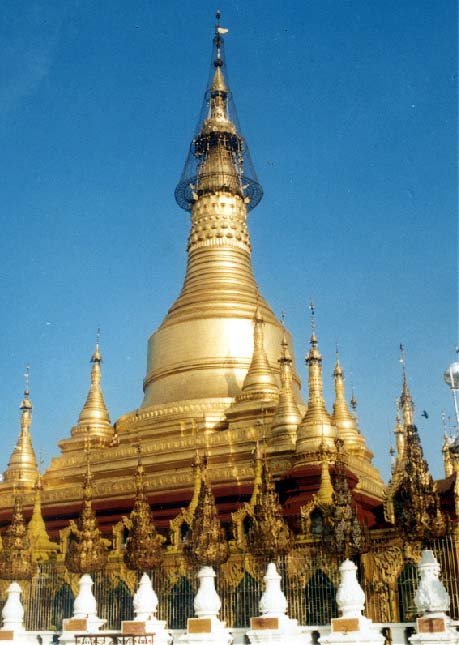

- Location within Myanmar

Religion
- Affiliation: Theravada Buddhism

Location
- Country: Myanmar
- Coordinates: 18°49′6″N 95°13′16″E

The Shwesandaw Pagoda, or Shwesandaw Paya (Burmese: ရွှေဆံတော်ဘုရား, pronounced [ʃwè sʰàɰ̃dɔ̀ pʰəjá]) is a Buddhist pagoda in the center of Pyay, in the Bago Region, Myanmar (formerly Burma). It is one of the more important Buddhist pilgrimage locations in the country. It is said to contain a few hair of Buddha, and its name means Golden Hair Relic.

During the full moon day of Tabodwe, Shwesandaw Pagoda holds a miphon pwe (မီးဖုန်းပွဲ), whereby worshippers light bonfires using Sesbania cannabina as tinder.
