= Smin Than-Kye =

Hanthawaddy military commander (active 1389–1413)

Smin: Than-Kye; သမိန် သံကြယ်
- သၟိင် သာံကြာယ် (also သၟိင် သာံကြာဲ)
- Military career
- Allegiance: Royal Hanthawaddy Armed Forces
- Branch: Navy, Army
- Service years: by 1389–1413
- Rank: Commander
- Conflicts: Ava–Hanthawaddy War (1385–1391); Ava–Hanthawaddy War (1401–1403); Ava–Hanthawaddy War (1408–1418) (to 1413)

Smin Than-Kye (Mon: သၟိင် သာံကြာယ် or သၟိင် သာံကြာဲ; (Note: (Pan Hla 2005) provides two Mon spellings: သာံကြာယ် and သာံကြာဲ) Burmese: သမိန် သံကြယ်, Burmese pronunciation: [θəmèiɴ θàɰ̃ dʑɛ̀]) was a Hanthawaddy military commander who fought in several campaigns of the Forty Years' War against Ava forces at least between 1389 and 1413. He is best remembered for his successful defense of Gu-Htut against much larger forces led by King Swa Saw Ke of Ava in 1390–1391.

== Military service ==
The following is a list of military campaigns in which Than-Kye is explicitly mentioned in the royal chronicles as a commander.

Campaign	Duration	Troops commanded (Note: Chronicle reported troop levels reduced by an order of magnitude per (Harvey 1925: 333–336))	Notes
Hanthawaddy conquest of the Irrawaddy delta	1389–1390	?	Co-commanded the Hanthawaddy force that occupied Gu-Htut.
Battle of Gu-Htut	1390–1391	5000 troops, 150 war boats	Overall commander of Gu-Htut Corps consisted 1 regiment and 4 naval squadrons.
Invasion of Ava	1401–1402	1 flotilla	Commanded one of the 13 flotillas that invaded along the Irrawaddy
Conquest of Arakan	March 1408		One of two deputy commanders in 1st Division of the strike force
Pursuit of Ava Army	August 1408		Commanded a regiment in the 2nd army that pursued the retreating Ava forces.
Battle of Khebaung	late 1410		Successfully defended Fort Khebaung against Minye Kyawswa's forces
Siege of Prome	late 1412	1 regiment	Commanded one of the eight regiments that laid siege to Prome
Siege of Talezi	December 1412–March 1413	1 regiment	Commanded one of the eight regiments that defended Fort Talezi (across the river from Prome) against Minye Kyawswa's forces

== Bibliography ==
- Harvey, G. E. (1925). History of Burma: From the Earliest Times to 10 March 1824. London: Frank Cass & Co. Ltd.
- Kala, U (2006) [1724]. Maha Yazawin (in Burmese). Vol. 1–3 (4th printing ed.). Yangon: Ya-Pyei Publishing.
- Maha Sithu (2012) [1798]. Myint Swe; Kyaw Win; Thein Hlaing (eds.). Yazawin Thit (in Burmese). Vol. 1–3 (2nd printing ed.). Yangon: Ya-Pyei Publishing.
- Pan Hla, Nai (2005) [1968]. Razadarit Ayedawbon (in Burmese) (8th printing ed.). Yangon: Armanthit Sarpay.
- Royal Historical Commission of Burma (2003) [1832]. Hmannan Yazawin (in Burmese). Vol. 1–3. Yangon: Ministry of Information, Myanmar.
