= Talok, Myanmar =

Village in Mandalay Region, Myanmar

Talok
- Village
- Location in Myanmar
- Coordinates: 21.568°N 95.383°E
- Country: Myanmar
- Region: Mandalay Region
- District: Myingyan District
- Township: Myingyan Township

Talok (Burmese: တလုပ်) is a group of four villages in Myingyan Township of Mandalay Region, Myanmar. It is located east of the Irrawaddy River. There are several historical sites at Talok, including a couple of temple ruins dating back to the Bagan period (11th-13th centuries). The Thonpanhla pagoda, which is a prominent pilgrimage center, is also located here.

== Geography ==
Talok is a cluster of four adjacent villages: Talok Myo proper, Myogyigon, Myaukywalay, and Ye-daing. It is 3.7 kilometres (2.3 mi) east of the Irrawaddy River. Immediately east and west of the village cluster are a couple of seasonal lakes (in-gyi), and a canal goes from the northeast corner of Myogyigon and then goes east for about 3 kilometres (1.9 mi) before meeting the Pyusawhti Dam.

== History ==
According to tradition, Talok existed as a cluster of four villages until the time of the Mongol invasions around 1300. Ye-daing was supposedly founded in 1300 as Than-The-Kyut.

At the turn of the 20th century, Talok was noted as the former headquarters of a wun. Its population as of 1895-96 was about 3,080.

== Thonpanhla pagoda ==
The most prominent active pagoda in the area today is Thonpanhla, which is located at the northern edge of Myogyigon. It is a popular pilgrimage destination. No Bagan-era artifacts have been found at Thona Pan Hla, but an archaeological survey turned up some Pyu-era brick fragments at the site, which belonged to an earlier structure. Local tradition connects the pagoda to both Ashoka's distribution of Buddhist relics in the 3rd century BCE, as well as to the legendary king Pyusawhti.

At the southwest of the pagoda complex is a shed containing a collection of at least 14 stone inscriptions. The earliest one dates to 1239, and another one dated to 1294 contains a reference to the village of Ye-poke, near Sagu; Ye-poke has been noted for its Pyu-era archaeological finds. Also present is a contemporary inscription recording renovations done in 2008 and the planned construction of a Bodhigaya History Museum.

The compound also has a number of contemporary statues, including ones of Ashoka and Pyusawhti along with many later Bagan kings, including Shin Arahan. The Shin Arahan statue was donated by U Ohn Maw and Daw Than Kyi at a cost of 200,000 kyats.

== Other historical sites ==
The massive abandoned Lay-myet-hna temple is located some 800 metres (2,600 ft) east of Thonpanhla and slightly to the south. It faces east and is stylistically dated to the late Bagan or early Pyinya period. There are also at least three large mounds nearby, running from north to south. Midway between Thonpanhla and Lay-myet-hna are the undated ruins of a roughly square walled area about 600 metres (2,000 ft) on each side. At one place, this wall runs through a private residence.

Farther south is another abandoned temple, called Hse-myet-hna. Located east of Ye-daing, it has 10 sides and an unusual two-story floorplan. Its long ground floor has many individual rooms, and there is also evidence that extra passageways were added at one point. The upper level has traces of four stupas at the corners, as well as the 10-faced structure at its center. The Hse-myet-hna temple likely dates to the late Bagan period, with later renovations. South of Hse-myet-hna is a monastery compound with a stupa and a renovated three-story structure decorated with several role of bilu (ogres). Based on stylistic grounds, this structure may date to the 12th or 13th century.
