= Baw Kyaw =

Governor of Dala

Baw Kyaw ဘောကျော်

Governor of Dala
- Reign: 1388/89 – 26 December 1402
- Predecessor: Nyi Kan-Kaung
- Successor: ?
- Monarch: Razadarit
- Born: c. 1370; Hanthawaddy kingdom
- Died: 26 December 1402; Tuesday, 3rd waxing of Tabodwe 764 ME; Nawin, Prome District; Ava Kingdom
- Father: Nyi Kan-Kaung
- Religion: Theravada Buddhism

Baw Kyaw (Mon: ဘဝ်ကျဝ်, Burmese: ဘောကျော်, Burmese pronunciation: [bɔ́ dʑò]; c. 1370–1402) was a Hanthawaddy royal and governor of Dala–Twante from 1388/89 to 1402.

Kyaw was appointed governor of Dala in 1388/89 by his half-uncle King Razadarit, who had ordered Kyaw's father Nyi Kan-Kaung executed for suspicion of rebellion. Despite this, Kyaw was a loyal vassal to his uncle. He became a commander in the army, and fought in the war against the northern Ava Kingdom. He died in action outside Prome (Pyay) on 26 December 1402. (Note: (Yazawin Thit Vol. 1 2012: 220): Tuesday, the 3rd waxing of Tabodwe 764 ME = 26 December 1402)

== Bibliography ==
- Maha Sithu (2012) [1798]. Kyaw Win; Thein Hlaing (eds.). Yazawin Thit (in Burmese). Vol. 1–3 (2nd printing ed.). Yangon: Ya-Pyei Publishing.
- Pan Hla, Nai (2005) [1968]. Razadarit Ayedawbon (in Burmese) (8th printing ed.). Yangon: Armanthit Sarpay.

Baw Kyaw Hanthawaddy Dynasty Born: c. 1370 Died: 26 December 1402
Royal titles
Preceded by Nyi Kan-Kaung	Governor of Dala; 1388/89–1402	Succeeded by ?
