= Tabodwe =

Eleventh month of Burmese calendar

Tabodwe (Burmese: တပို့တွဲ) is the eleventh month of the traditional Burmese calendar.

== Festivals and observances ==
- Full moon of Tabodwe
  - Harvest Festival (ထမနဲပွဲတော်)
  - Mon National Day

Rakhine tug of war festival, Yatha Hswe Pwe.

- Pagoda festivals
  - Alaungdaw Kathapa Pagoda Festival (Sagaing Region)
  - Shwe Settaw Pagoda Festival (Minbu Township, Magwe Region)
  - Kyaikkhauk Pagoda Festival (Thanlyin Township, Yangon Region)

== Tabodwe symbols ==
- Flower: Butea monosperma

== See also ==
- Burmese calendar
- Festivals of Burma
