= G. E. Harvey =

Burmese historian and professor (1889–1965)

- Born: Godfrey Eric Harvey; 1889; Clapham, London, United Kingdom
- Died: 29 August 1962 (aged 73); United Kingdom
- Occupation: Historian
- Spouse: Stella Hope Garratt
- Children: Charles Nigel Harvey; Daphne Harvey

Academic background
- Education: University of Oxford

Academic work
- Discipline: Southeast Asian History
- Sub-discipline: Burmese history

Godfrey Eric Harvey (1889 – 29 August 1962) was a British diplomat, historian and academic, specializing in Burmese history. He is best known for his seminal books on Burmese history, including History of Burma, which was published in 1925 and known for its Burmese chronicle perspective.

== Life ==
He was the son of Edward Godfrey Harvey, who had a career in the House of Commons Library, and his Dutch wife Martine (or Martha) Antoinette van Kuyk, who were married in December 1885; his younger brother Edward Leon Harvey was a historian at the University of New Brunswick.

Harvey was educated at Aldenham School and Exeter Grammar School, and London University. Suffering from a lung complaint, Harvey did not complete a degree at London University. Taking the Indian Civil Service examination, he gained an administrative position in Burma, and learned the language.

On sick leave in 1920, Harvey studied in Oxford, and obtained a BLitt degree from University of Oxford in 1922. His dissertation was published by Longmans in 1925.

Harvey became a lecturer in Burmese history and law at the University of Oxford from 1936 to 1942. He was president of the Oxford University Anthropological Society in the 1940s. After World War II, he retired and lived in Oxford.

== Publications ==
- "The Writing of Burmese History" in Journal of the Burma Research Society
- Outline of Burmese History (1924)
- History of Burma (1925)
- British Rule in Burma, 1824–1942 (1946)

== Family ==
Harvey married in 1914, in Colombo, Stella Hope Garratt, daughter of the Rev. Charles Foster Garratt (formerly vicar of Little Tew), and sister of Geoffrey Garratt. They had one son and one daughter.
