= Apaya =

Apaya Maha Raza အဘယ မဟာ ရာဇာ
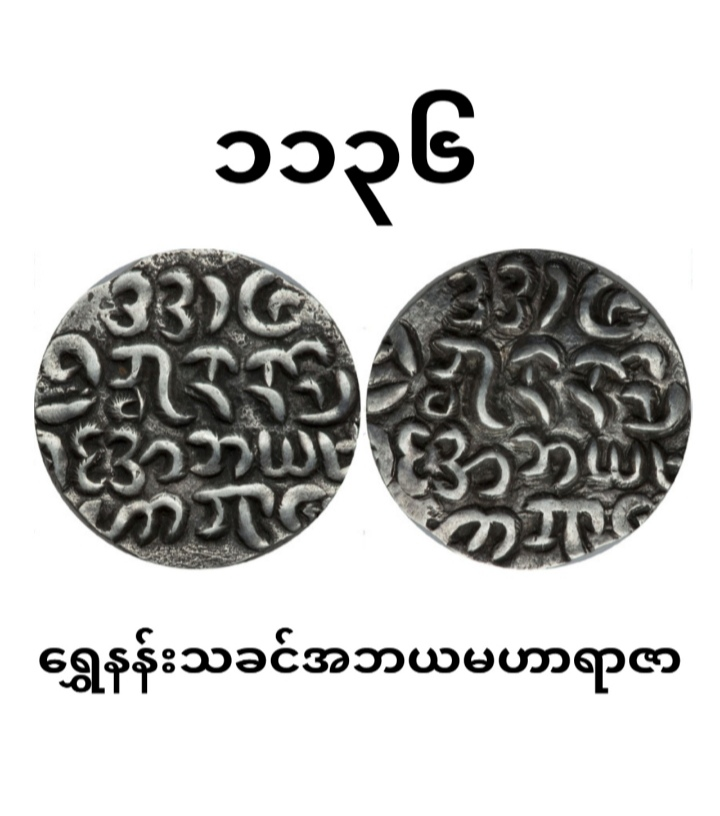
- Coin which was stamped by Arakanese King Apaya MahaRaza at the year of Arakanese Era 1136 (AD 1774)

King of Arakan
- Reign: 1 May 1764 – 17 January 1774
- Coronation: 1 May 1764
- Predecessor: Sanda Parama
- Successor: Sanda Thumana
- Born: 1710 CE
- Died: 17 January 1774 CE (aged 55); Mrauk U Palace
- Consort: Saw Shwe Kya (စောရွှေကြာ)
- Issue: Re Baw and others
- Shwenanthakhin apayamaharaza ရွှေနန်းသခင် အဘယမဟာရာဇာ
- Father: unknown
- Mother: unknown
- Religion: Theravada Buddhism

Apaya Maha Raza (Arakanese:အဘယ မဟာရာဇာ, 1710 - 17 January 1774) was the 44th king of the Mrauk-U Dynasty of Arakan, a former state in Myanmar (Burma). from 1764 to 1774. The king's son, crown prince who rose in rebellion died by his own hand. He was succeeded by his brother-in-law after successful revolt whom the king died.

He served as deputy general under King Sanda Parama and was known for quelling Burman incursions in southern Arakan.

King Apaya ordered his brother, Chit Thu who was a governor of Ramree to commissioned to repair the Mahamuni Temple.

== Reign ==
His personal name was 'Than Daung' (သံထောင်), originally served as governor of Ramree and deputy general under King Sanda Parama, who later suspicious of rebelling and order to assassinate the deputy. Apaya successfully dethroned Parama and ordered to enter monkhood and exiled to Myegu Island.

Than Daung was crowned on (1st waning of Kason,1126 ME) and his queen was Saw Shwe-Kya (စောရွှေကြာ), assumed the title of 'Maha Apaya Raza'. Month of pyartho, great fire destroyed Mahamuni Temple. King order his brother to commissioned to raise funds to rebuild the temple with large portions of gold, silvers donated by the king for greater good deeds. King and his families rode on royal golden raft to the city of Dhanyawadi to pay to tribute.

In the year 1773, Ba Htaw, lord of Sandoway faced Burman incursion fled. The news reached the capital, Apaya sent his army led by his brother to face the threat. However the foreign raiders were already quelled by the troops of Sandoway. The encounter becomes parallel and bitter between capital's troops and native troops of Sandoway. Sandoway becomes self-independent from its own.

The King's son, crown prince Re Baw murder Ngathaukkya's brother, enraged by the actions of king's son, who was executed by the king. Ngathaukkya (ငသောကြာ) who sided with the Bengali Muslims from the Sittwe Island set up camp for his army at Urittaung. Ngathaukkya confronts that he only intends to target the crown prince not the king. Once entering the capital the king was killed and Ngathaukkya seized the throne and later styled as Sanda Thumana.

== Bibliography ==
- Harvey, G. E. (1925). History of Burma: From the Earliest Times to 10 March 1824. London: Frank Cass & Co. Ltd.
- Myat Soe, ed. (1964). Myanma Swezon Kyan (in Burmese). Vol. 9 (1 ed.). Yangon: Sarpay Beikman.
- Myint-U, Thant (2006). The River of Lost Footsteps—Histories of Burma. Farrar, Straus and Giroux. ISBN 978-0-374-16342-6.
- Sandamala Linkara, Ashin (1931). Rakhine Yazawinthit Kyan (in Burmese). Vol. 1–2 (1997 ed.). Yangon: Tetlan Sarpay.
