= Sanda Parama =

Sanda Parama Raza စန္ဒပရမရာဇာ

King of Arakan
- Reign: 4 February 1762 - 1 May 1764
- Coronation: 4 February 1762
- Predecessor: Thirithu
- Successor: Apaya
- Born: 1103 ME
- Died: 1st waxing of Nayon, 1126 ME (aged 23)
- Consort: Aung Kyawt San (အောင်ကြော့စံ)
- Issue: at least one son (his name is not recorded in coronicles)
Names
- Shwenanthakin Sandaparama Raza ရွှေနန်းသခင် စန္ဒပရမရာဇာ
- Father: Nara Apaya
- Mother: unknown
- Religion: Theravada Buddhism

Sanda Parama (Arakanese:စန္ဒပရမ, 1741- 1764) was a 43rd king of the Mrauk-U Dynasty of Arakan. Under his reign, the 1762 Arakan earthquake that destroyed much of infrastructure and agricultural lands of Arakan led to the dethroning of the king. He entered monkhood and exiled to Myingun Island.

During his short reign, the earthquake of 1762 damaged much of Arakan's agricultural production that ultimately caused great famine and political turmoil which eventually turned to regional revolts in planning to overthrown dynasty headed by the Lord of Ramree and governor of Launggyet, and the general of Cheduba Island where they asked for aid of Burmese King, Naungdawgyi.

The Burmese king Naungdawgyi, dispatched 50,000 armed intruders led by vice general Shwe Pyi Wan. Where heavy fighting was reported in southern Arakan, however the invading armies were initially crushed and forced to retreat.

== Bibliography ==
- Harvey, G. E. (1925). History of Burma: From the Earliest Times to 10 March 1824. London: Frank Cass & Co. Ltd.
- Myat Soe, ed. (1964). Myanma Swezon Kyan (in Burmese). Vol. 9 (1 ed.). Yangon: Sarpay Beikman.
- Myint-U, Thant (2006). The River of Lost Footsteps—Histories of Burma. Farrar, Straus and Giroux. ISBN 978-0-374-16342-6.
- Sandamala Linkara, Ashin (1931). Rakhine Yazawinthit Kyan (in Burmese). Vol. 1–2 (1997 ed.). Yangon: Tetlan Sarpay.
