= Smin Bayan =

15th-century Burmese military commander

Smin: Baram; သမိန်ဗရမ်း
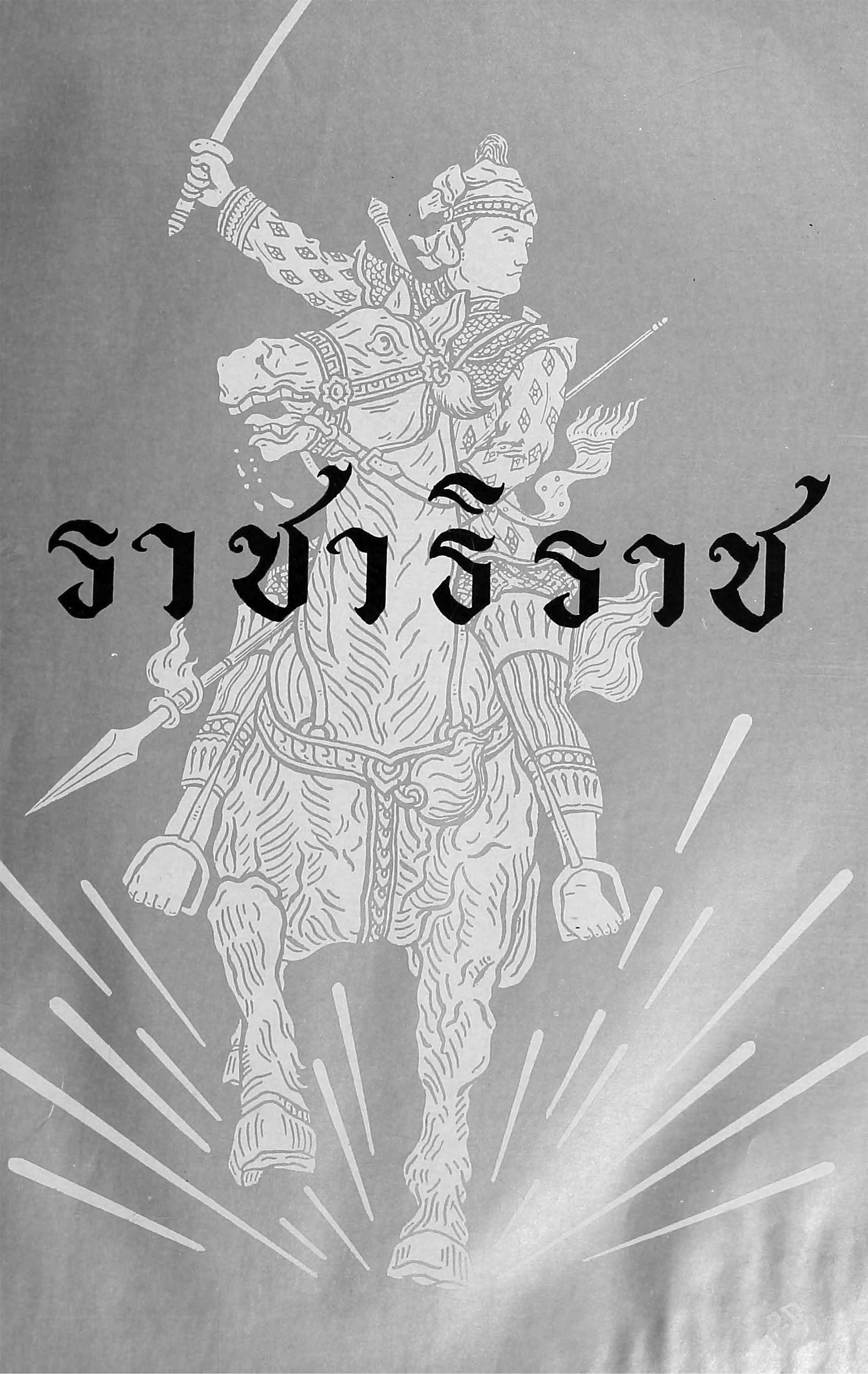
- An illustration of Smin Bayan from Rachathirat (a Thai version of Razadarit Ayedawbon), 1954 printed edition.

Governor of Donwun?
- In office c. 1423 – c. 1440s?
- Monarchs: Binnya Dhammaraza (1423–1424); Binnya Ran I (1424–1446?)
- Preceded by: ?
- Succeeded by: ?

Governor of Legaing
- In office 1415–1423
- Monarchs: Minkhaung I (1415–1421); Thihathu (1421–1423)
- Preceded by: ?
- Succeeded by: ?

Governor of Hpaunghnin
- In office 1402–1402
- Monarch: Razadarit

Personal details
- Born: c. 1380s Hanthawaddy kingdom
- Died: Unknown Hanthawaddy kingdom
- Spouses: Tala Mi Saw (m. 1402–?); Daughter of Gov. Yazathu of Talok (1415–1423)

Military service
- Allegiance: Hanthawaddy kingdom (1401–1414, 1423 onwards); Ava Kingdom (1414–1423)
- Branch/service: Royal Hanthawaddy Armed Forces (1401–1414, 1423–1430s); Royal Ava Armed Forces (1415–1423)
- Years of service: 1401–1430s
- Rank: General
- Unit: Army, Navy
- Battles/wars: Ava–Hanthawaddy War (1401–1403); Ava–Hanthawaddy War (1408–1418) (to 1414); Ava–Hanthawaddy War (1422–1423); Ava–Hanthawaddy War (1430–1431)

Smin Baram (Mon: သၟိၚ် ပရာံ; Burmese: သမိန် ဗရမ်း or သမိန် ပရမ်း, (Note: The modern spelling သမိန် ဗရမ်း per (MSK 1973: 33–37) and (Ne Soe Htet 2011: 211–215). သမိန် ပရမ်း is the spelling used in the main chronicles; see (Maha Yazawin Vol. 2 2006: 35) (Yazawin Thit Vol. 1 2012: 249), (Hmannan Vol. 2 2003: 24).) Burmese pronunciation: [θəmèiɴ bəjáɴ]), also called Benya Dharem (Mon: ဗညာဓရာံ or ဗညာဓရေမ်), was an early 15th-century commander who fought for both Hanthawaddy Pegu and Ava during the Forty Years' War. He is best known in Burmese history for successfully repelling a Chinese invasion in 1414–1415 on behalf of Ava.

A son-in-law of King Razadarit of Pegu, Bayan defected to Ava soon after being captured in battle in 1414. Following his success against the Chinese, he was appointed governor of Legaing by King Minkhaung I of Ava. In 1423, less than two years after the deaths of Minkhaung and Razadarit, Bayan returned to his native land. He led the Hanthawaddy army in a successful campaign against Ava 1430–1431.

== Background ==
Smin Bayan was a Mon language title worn by successive commanders in the service of the monarchs of Hanthawaddy Pegu. This article is about the first of the two most prominent Smin Bayans, whose stories are featured in the royal chronicles.

Chronicles provide little information about the background of the first Smin Bayan. His previous title was Smin Upakaung (သမိန် ဥပါကောင်း, Burmese pronunciation: [θəmèiɴ ʔṵ bà gáʊ̯ɴ]), (Note: The Burmese encyclopaedia Myanma Swezon Kyan (MSK Vol. 13 1973: 33) says that Bayan's prior title was Upakaung citing Kawi-Letkhana Thatpon Kyan, an 18th century treatise on Burmese orthography. (Ne Soe Htet 2011: 215) also says that Bayan was Upakaung, citing U Aw, who was the author of the 18th century treatise.) and his personal name was Athayi (အသရီ, Burmese pronunciation: [ʔəθəjì]). (Note: (Yazawin Thit Vol. 1 2012: 213); Transliteration of Athayi based on modern Burmese pronunciation. A Mon pronunciation-based transliteration might be closer to Asari.) He had an elder brother, Smin Upakaung the Elder, who was married to Princess Tala Mi Saw, daughter of King Razadarit of Hanthawaddy Pegu. Based on the language used in the chronicles, he was probably born in the 1380s, (Note: (Yazawin Thit Vol. 1 240–241) and (Hmannan Vol. 2 2003: 11): Upakaung referred to Crown Prince Minye Kyawswa (b. 1391) as nyidaw (ညီတော်, "Royal Younger Brother"). The usage suggests Upakaung was older than but of the same generation as Minye Kyawswa. He was old enough to be a frontline commander in 1401–1402.) and was related to the royal family. (Note: (Yazawin Thit Vol. 1 2012: 218): Given that Athayi's elder brother was married to Razadarit's daughter Tala Mi Saw, and that the king's two other daughters were married to their cousins (Razadarit's half-nephews Saw Maha-Rit and Smin Sithu), Athayi and his brother were probably related to the royal family. Furthermore, in (Yazawin Thit Vol. 1 240–241) and (Hmannan Vol. 2 2003: 11), Upakaung referred to himself as son-in-law of ashin bagyidaw (အရှင် ဘကြီးတော်, "Lord Royal Elder Paternal Uncle") Razadarit. To be sure, the term alone need not indicate a true blood relation; it could have been a courtesy usage (as he addressed Minye Kyawswa as nyidaw ("Royal Younger Brother")). At any rate, someone of commoner descent would probably not have used ashin bagyidaw to address the king, or nyidaw to address a crown prince, or be married to a daughter of the king.)

== Early career ==
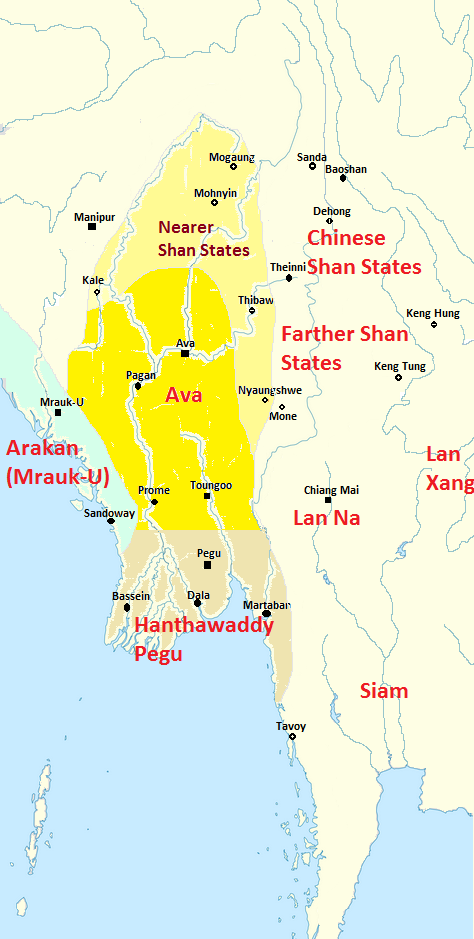
Burma c. 1450 when the nearer Shan States were under Ava's suzerainty. The political map in the early 15th century between Ava and Pegu was similar.

=== Invasion of Ava (1401–1402) ===
In 1401, Athayi was an officer in the Hanthawaddy army that invaded the northern Ava Kingdom to renew the Forty Years' War. He initially served as the deputy commander of the regiment led by his elder brother. But he soon became the commander early in the campaign after his brother was killed in the battle of Myede. Despite some early successes, the invasion ultimately sputtered. It was during the withdrawal in 1402 that Athayi made his name. In a rearguard action, his undermanned cavalry is said to have driven back an elite Ava cavalry corps, either near Pagan (Bagan) or Sale. In one version, he is said to have fought off the two best Ava cavalry officers, Chit Swe and Chit Thin, while another says he fought off several Ava cavalry even after having been hit with a spear on one of his legs and having been thrown off his horse; the Ava troops retreated, thinking the man was possessed. In both versions, King Razadarit is said to have witnessed the battle, and was extremely impressed by the young officer's performance.

=== Rise to prominence ===
Once back in the southern country, Razadarit rewarded those who served with distinction and punished those who fled. The king ordered the execution of Saw Maha-Rit, one of his sons-in-law, for fleeing the scene at the battle of Prome, and for losing Princess Tala Mi Kyaw to Ava forces. On the other hand, Razadarit awarded Athayi the title of Smin Upakaung, which was the title of Athayi's fallen brother, and married him to Princess Tala Mi Saw. In essence, Athayi had succeeded both the title and wife of his late brother. The king also appointed his new son-in-law governor of Hpaunghnin. However, Upakaung Athayi probably held the governorship of the district located inside Ava's traditional borders for at most a few months, if at all, since Ava forces went on to recapture all Ava lands by the end of 1402. The two kingdoms reached a truce in 1403 that restored the prewar border, south of Prome. Chronicles do not say if Razadarit gave Upakaung another governorship.

== Renewal of war (1408–1414) ==
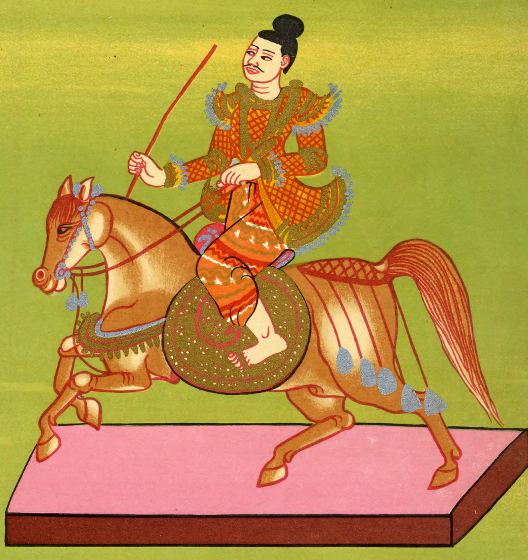
Minye Kyawswa represented as the Min Kyawzwa nat tried to get Upakaung (Bayan) to defect.

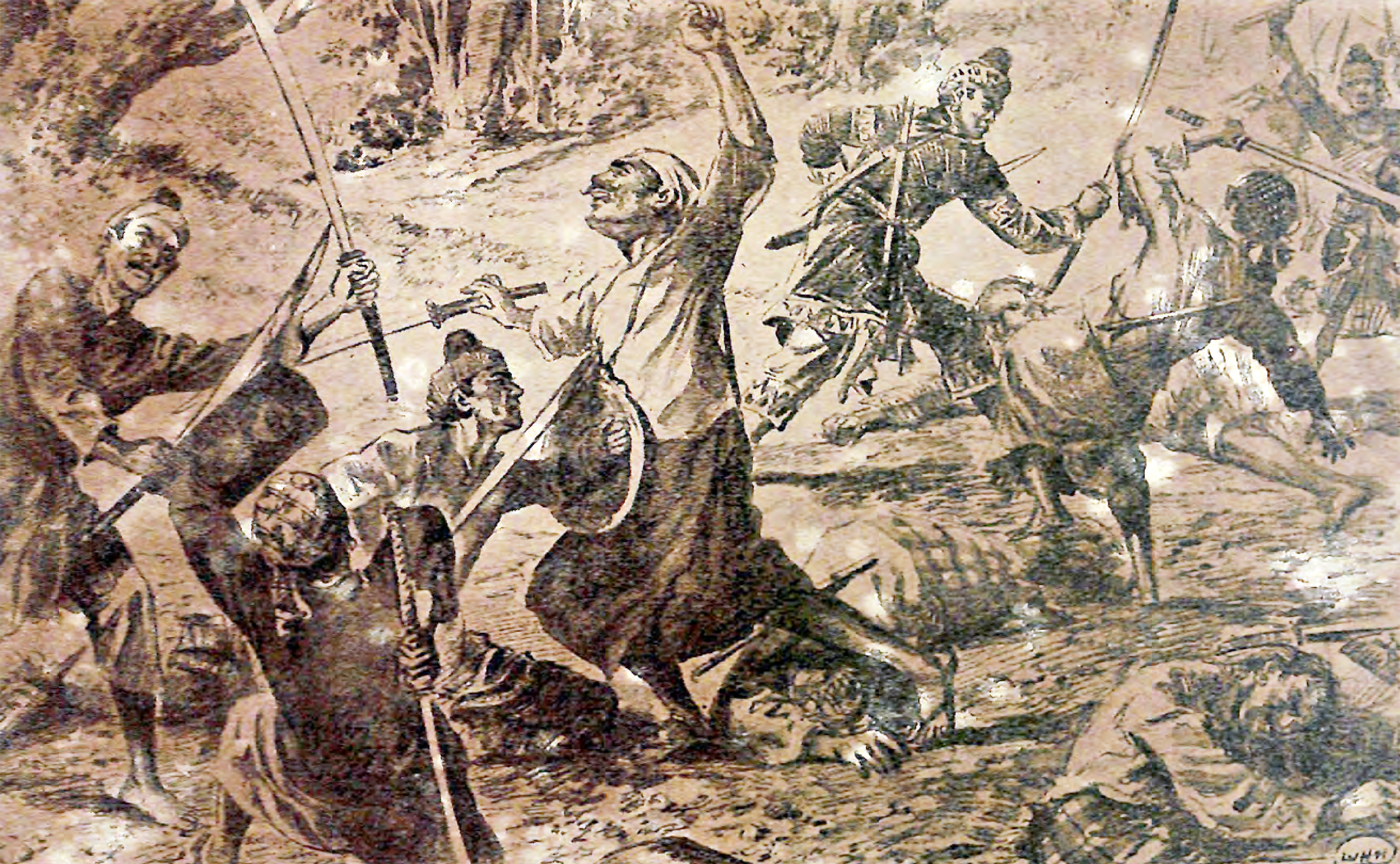
Lagun Ein and Smin Bayan fought Burmese troops together with their double swords.

Upakaung was again called into service when Razadarit renewed the war in 1408. The frontline commander served with distinction until he was captured by the enemy in 1414.

Even before his capture, Upakaung had long been noticed by the Ava high command. He was one of the commanders that drove back the Ava forces led by King Minkhaung I in 1408. In 1412–1413, he repeatedly held off Crown Prince Minye Kyawswa near Prome (Pyay). So impressed was Minye Kyawswa that he tried to get Upakaung to defect. The crown prince asked to meet Upakaung in person under the guise of a truce negotiation. When they met near Talezi, on the west bank of the Irrawaddy river near Prome, Minye Kyawswa offered Upakaung a prominent governorship on par with the governorship of Prome. Upakaung refused the offer.

But he could not stem the tide of war. In late 1414, now known by his new title of Smin Bayan (Smin Baram), (Note: He may have received the title as early as 1413. In the chronicle Razadarit Ayedawbon (Pan Hla 2005: 283-284), the name Smin Bayan appears soon after the death of Gen. Byat Za (c. March 1413). But in the main chronicles (Yazawin Thit Vol. 1 2012: 249) and (Hmannan Vol. 2 2003: 23) Smin Bayan first appears in 1414; furthermore, the title of Smin Upakaung was succeeded by another commander, whose previous title was Minhla Kyawkhaung.) he led a counterattack on Ava supply lines. But Minye Kyawswa beat back the attack, and captured Bayan and 20 other senior Hanthawaddy commanders. The crown prince took a break from the campaign, and made a 17-day trip to personally bring Bayan to Ava (Inwa), before returning to the southern front.

== In Ava's service (by 1415–1423) ==
At Ava, Bayan was initially put in prison. He soon decided to switch sides, agreeing to fight for Ava against an invading Chinese army. According to the Burmese chronicles, he was instrumental in driving back the Chinese. For this victory, he is mythologized and celebrated in Burmese history. While chronicles perhaps simplistically state he switched sides because he did not want to be in prison forever, modern Burmese narratives have portrayed Bayan's decision in pan-Burmese nationalist terms, as overcoming internal differences between fraternal Burmese nations and fighting against a common foreign aggressor. (Note: See the Burmese encyclopedia Myanma Swezon Kyan (MSK Vol. 13 1973: 33–37) and (Ne Soe Htet 2011): Bayan decided to fight for Ava because he feared Chinese domination more. The writings however do not mention that Pegu was in fact allied with China.)

=== Chinese invasion (1414–1415) ===
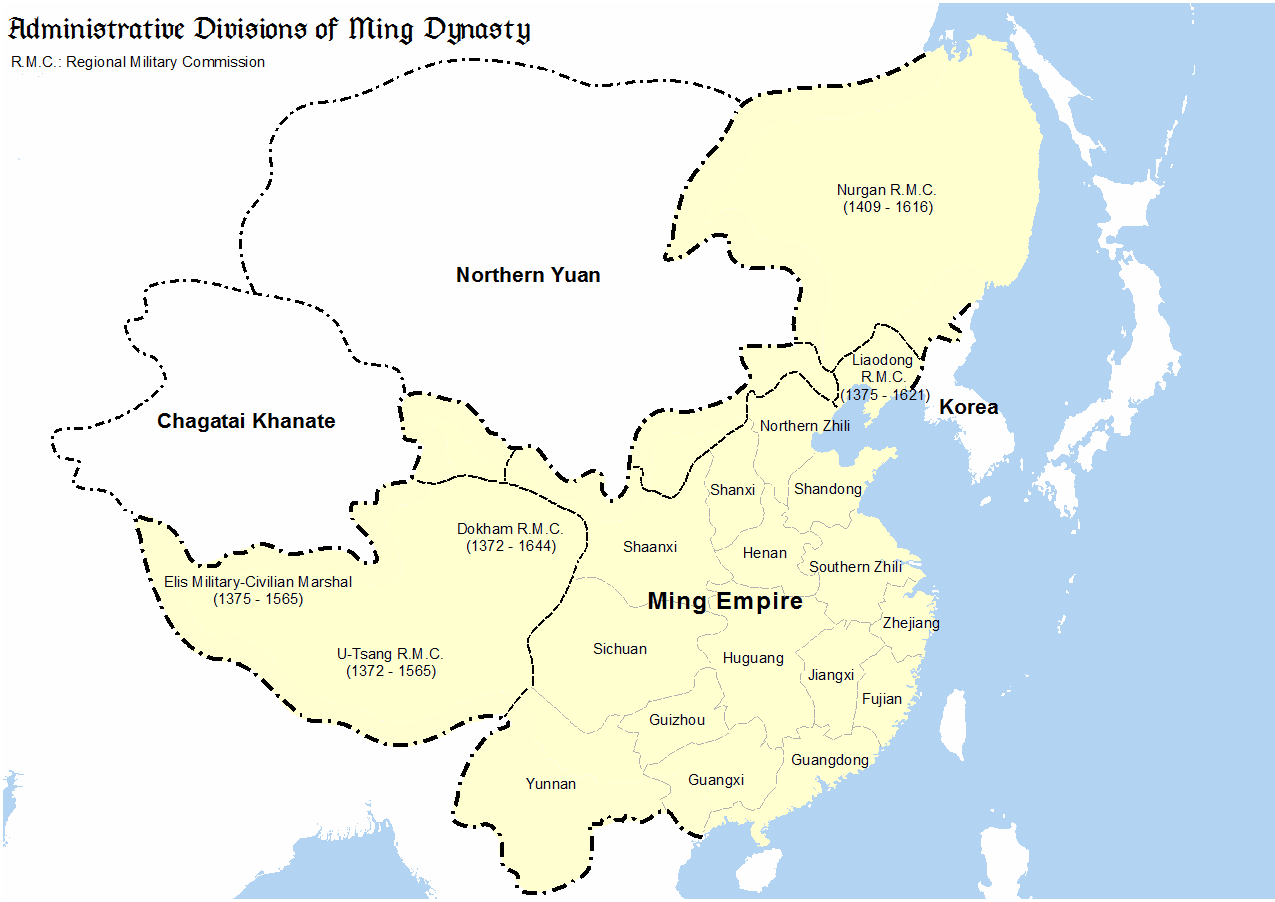
Ming China under the Yongle Emperor attacked Ava over the control of nearer Shan States in present-day northern and eastern Myanmar, which it considered its tributaries.

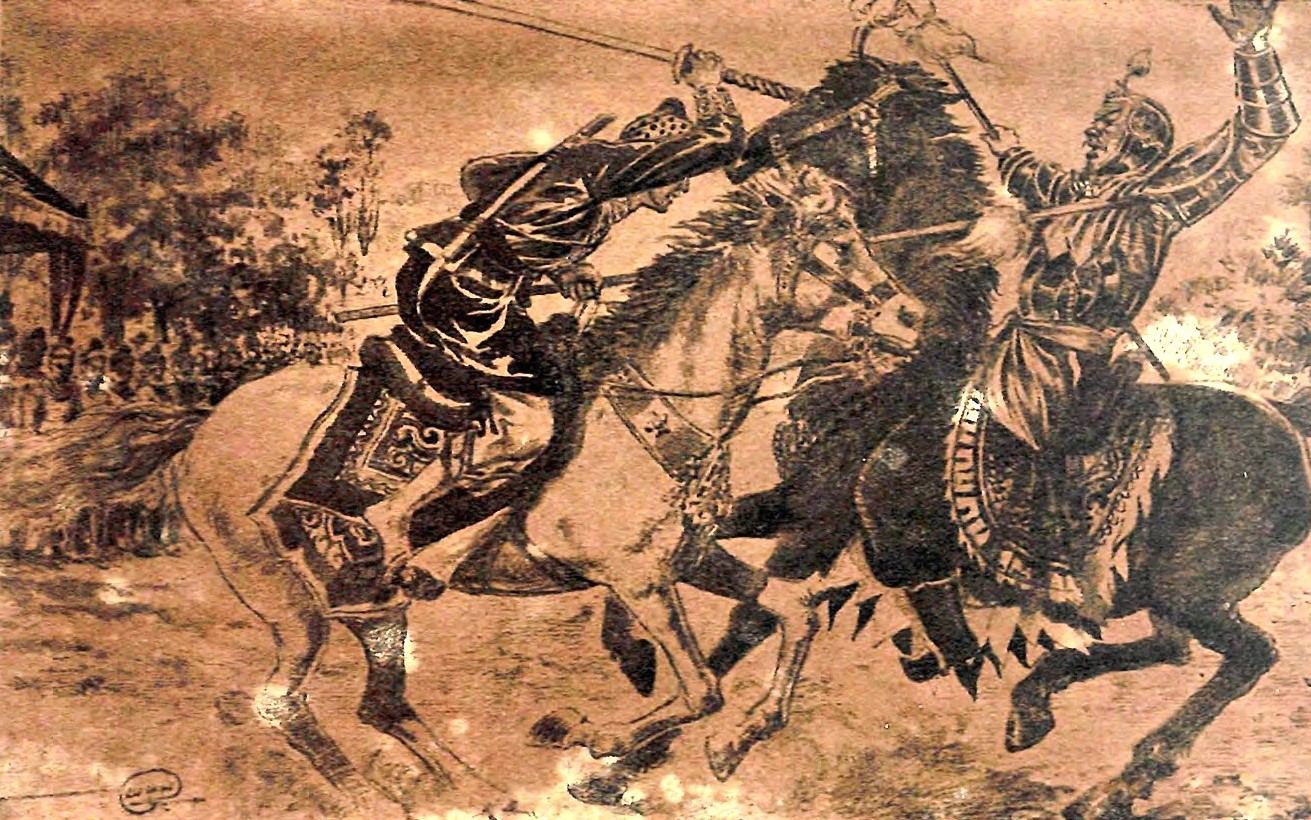
The duel of Smin Bayan and the Chinese General. An illustration from Rachathirat, a Thai version of Razadarit Ayedawbon, 1946 printed edition.

Whatever drove him to defect, Bayan was agreeing to fight against Pegu's key ally, China. The Ming court had been alarmed by Ava's conquests of the nearer Shan states, which it considered its vassals, in 1403–1406, and had supported Razadarit, characteristically recognizing the Hanthawaddy king as its "governor". It had also authorized annual attacks by its own Yunnan-based troops as well as those of its vassal Shan states along the border on Ava's northern territories since 1412. Its 1412–1413 and 1413–1414 invasions were serious enough that Minkhaung had to redeploy Minye Kyawswa to the northern front each time, providing much-needed breathing room for Pegu.

In late 1414, as Ava forces began their assault on the central Pegu province, the Chinese again opened the northern front. According to the Burmese chronicles, King Minkhaung did not deem the invasion this time to be serious enough. Instead of recalling Minye Kyawswa and the main armies as he did in the previous years, Minkhaung sent just a small army this time. But the Chinese army is said to have advanced all the way to Ava (Inwa) and laid siege to the Burmese capital. (Note: The chronicle narrative is inconsistent. First, chronicles say the Chinese army only reached the main fort guarding the invasion route. Chronicles do not name the fort. Instead, they provide the names of the outposts outside the fort that the Chinese army had captured: Yaw-Wa (or Nga Ya-wa), Kyei-myin-daing, Taung-Bilu, Lon-daw-bauk. Afterwards, the narrative changes to the capital being under siege.) After a month of siege, c. January 1415, (Note: According to chronicle reporting, (Maha Yazawin Vol. 2 2006: 38–39), (Yazawin Thit Vol. 1 2012: 252–253) and (Hmannan Vol. 2 2003: 30–31), Bayan's battle with the Chinese apparently took place c. Tabodwe 776 ME (10 January 1415 to 7 February 1415) when Razadarit returned to Pegu from Martaban.) both sides agreed to settle the matters with a duel on horseback between their chosen champions. The Chinese would retreat if their champion lost; but Ava would become a tributary of China if the Ava champion lost. Chronicles continue that the king searched for the best horseback fighter in the city, and convinced Bayan, a highly acclaimed cavalry officer, to represent the Ava side. Bayan defeated the Ming champion in the duel, and the Chinese forces retreated.

The chronicle story has many issues. First, the Ming records do not say any of their expeditions in the 1410s reached the Burmese capital, or provide any of the details found in the Burmese chronicles. Furthermore, the chronicles do not explain why Minkhaung did not recall his main forces during the month-long siege; why he would risk the fate of his kingdom on the outcome of a duel in which his champion was a recent defector from Pegu; or why the Chinese command would agree to a duel if their army had already advanced to the Burmese capital. In any case, the story, according to Than Tun, lacks credibility and "historicity". (Note: (Than Tun 2011: 45): Both Bayan stories are too similar, and neither is credible; the second Bayan story is even less believable than the first. The "historicity"—Than Tun used the English word here—of both stories is highly questionable.)

=== Governor of Legaing (1415–1423) ===
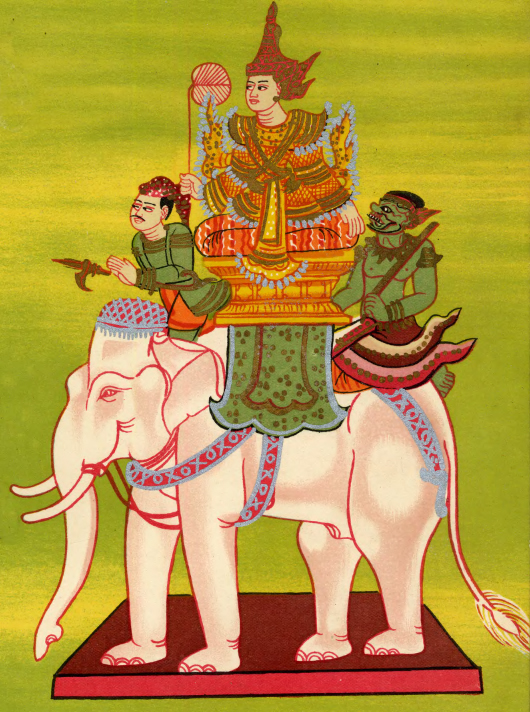
King Thihathu depicted as the Aung Pinle Hsinbyushin nat (spirit)

At any rate, the former Hanthawaddy commander apparently played a key role in driving back the Chinese, even if the stakes were not as high or the events were not as dramatic as chronicles make them out to be. For his service, Bayan was made governor of Legaing along with the regalia befitting a prince, and wedded to a younger daughter of Gov. Yazathu of Talok by a grateful Minkhaung. Bayan spent the next seven years in the northern kingdom. However, he apparently did not go to the southern front while Razadarit was alive. (Note: His name is conspicuously absent from the commander lists of the campaigns in the following years of the war.)

Bayan went to the front only after the deaths of Minkhaung and Razadarit in 1421. In early 1423, he marched to the south alongside Thihathu (r. 1421–1425), the new king of Ava, in Ava's attempt to interfere in the succession crisis in Pegu. The invasion ended amicably in a peace treaty between Thihathu and Prince Binnya Ran, one of the pretenders to the Pegu throne.

For his part, Bayan saw an opportunity for him to return to his native land and be rehabilitated. Upon withdrawal of Ava troops, Bayan accompanied Thihathu on an elephant hunting trip in Tharrawaddy at the border. He made a break for the border during the hunting trip, shouting back to Thihathu as he rode away that he needed to return to his homeland as he missed his wife and family in the south.

== Back in the native land ==
According to the main chronicles, Bayan entered Binnya Ran's service. In 1430, he was the overall commander of the Hanthawaddy army that attacked Prome (Pyay). It was an opportunistic attempt by Ran (r. 1424–1446) to pick off Ava's southern territories during a prolonged political turmoil at Ava. Ran was allied with Thinkhaya III of Toungoo, who had declared independence from Ava since 1426. (In addition to Bayan's 5000-strong army, Ran also sent in a naval flotilla carrying 5000 men. Thinkhaya sent another 5000 men.) The campaign went well for the allies, and King Mohnyin Thado of Ava (r. 1426–1439) reluctantly agreed to consider Ran's terms. While peace negotiations were taking place in Ava, Bayan visited his Ava counterpart Yazathingyan's camp several times, socializing with Yazathingyan, who was a close friend during Bayan's stay in the north. But King Thado, who had been incensed by Ran's demands, broke the protocol, and ordered Yazathingyan to arrest Bayan when the Hanthawaddy general visited the next time. Bayan was arrested at his next visit. However, Bayan was released shortly after as Thado and Ran reached a deal.

According to the Pak Lat Chronicles, an early 20th century Mon language chronicle of uncertain provenance and reliability, Bayan was made governor of Donwun by King Binnya Kyan of Pegu, and died after being bitten by the severed head of a bandit. The story of his demise is suspiciously similar to that of Sigurd Eysteinsson. The supernatural nature of his death aside, Binnya Kyan was viceroy of Martaban, not king of Pegu. Although it is quite probable that Bayan would have held a prominent governorship—Donwun was the ancestral home of the dynasty—Pak Lat in general contains several unsubstantiated claims and mangled timelines that it is difficult to discern which parts of its narrative might be true. (Note: Pak Lat makes several uncorroborated and unsubstantiated claims: (Pan Hla 2005: 363–365): Binnya Kyan was king of Pegu; Bayan as governor of Donwun attended the court of Kyan by commuting back-and-forth between Donwun and Pegu (130km by modern roads--one way) daily on horseback. One day, on his return trip to Donwun, he was attacked by a demon ghost, and he died three days later. However, per (Phayre 1873:120) and (Aung-Thwin 2017: 262), Kyan was viceroy of Martaban, not king of Pegu. If Bayan was indeed governor of Donwun as Pak Lat claims, he would have attended the court of Viceroy Binnya Kyan of Martaban since Donwun was part of the Martaban province. Nor did Bayan die shortly after; he was fighting a war in 1430–1431 against Ava per (Hmannan 2003: 71–73). Furthermore, per (MSK Vol. 13 1973: 37), it was the second Smin Bayan (not the first Smin Bayan) who died from wounds after being attacked on the road by a thief.; Furthermore, Pak Lat (Pan Hla 2005: 365) claims that Bayan had married a daughter of Minkhaung, and the son from the union named Yama Yazawuntha (Rama Rajavamsa) became king of Ava succeeding Thihathu, and that Yama Yazawuntha's son also became king of Ava in 802 ME (1440/41) with the title of Minye Kyawswa. However, according to the main chronicles (Yazawin Thit Vol. 1 2012: 253) (Hmannan Vol. 2 2003: 30), Bayan was married to a daughter of Gov. Yazathu of Talok, not Minkhaung. King Thihathu was succeeded by his eldest son Min Hla (r. 1425), who in turn was succeeded by Kale Kye-Taung Nyo (r. 1425–1426). King Minye Kyawswa I of Ava (r. 1439–1442) was the eldest son of King Mohnyin Thado (r. 1426–1439).)

Bayan is not mentioned again in the main chronicles after 1431. He may still have been alive in 1442/43 when his wife Princess Tala Mi Saw may have been appointed governor of Martaban; she is said to have still been married to a high-ranking official, who presumably was Bayan. (Note: (Phayre 1873: 120) and (Aung-Thwin 2017: 262) say that Binnya Kyan was succeeded by his sister who was married to a high ranking official. Neither source explicitly names the sister. The chronicle Razadarit Ayedawbon (Pan Hla 2005) mentions only three daughters of Razadarit: Tala Mi Kyaw, Tala Mi Saw and Shin Saw Pu. The succeeding sister could not be Tala Mi Kyaw, who per (Pan Hla 2005: 224) was captured by Ava forces in 1402. Nor could she be Princess Shin Saw Pu, who had been unmarried since 1429, and later became queen regnant of Hanthawaddy per (Hmannan Vol. 2 2003: 92). None of the main chronicles mentions Shin Saw Pu's stay at Martaban in any case. This leaves Tala Mi Saw, who was married to Smin Bayan. If Tala Mi Saw did become governor, Bayan was likely still alive at the time of her accession.)

== Commemorations ==
Smin Bayan is commemorated in Myanmar with his name typically transliterated as Thamein Bayan or Thamain Bayan.

- Thamein Bayan Road, Tamwe Township, Yangon
- Thamein Bayan Road, Mawlamyine, Mon State
- Thamein Bayan Street, Thingangyun Township, Yangon
- Thamein Bayan Street, Dawbon Township, Yangon

== List of campaigns ==
The following is a list of Smin Bayan Upakaung's military campaigns as reported in the chronicles.

Campaign	Duration	Troops commanded	Notes
Invasion of Ava	1401–1402	1 regiment	Commanded 1 regiment in the initial invasion force into Upper Burma; led the cavalry corps. Commanded 1 regiment in the Prome campaign in late 1402.
Ava's invasion of Pegu	1408	1 regiment (1000 troops)	Commanded a cavalry regiment in the initial invasion force into Upper Burma. Member of the delegation to negotiate a truce. Led one of the three regiments that chased the retreating Ava troops.
Ava's invasion of Pegu	1409–1410	500 troops	Led 500 troops, 15 elephants
Ava's invasions of Pegu	1410–1412	unknown	Upakaung's name is not mentioned
Ava's invasion of Pegu	1412–1413	1 regiment	Under the command of Binnya Bassein in the siege of Prome
Ava's invasion of Pegu	1414	1 regiment	Led the counterattack on Ava supply lines but was captured.
Chinese invasion of Ava	1415	?	Fought on Ava side, and played a key role in defeating the invasion. Reported in the chronicles as successfully representing the Ava side in a duel with the Chinese champion.
Ava's invasion of Pegu	1422–1423	?	Fought on Ava side against Prince Binnya Ran's forces. Fled to Hanthawaddy side after a peace agreement was reached.
Pegu's invasion of Ava	1430–1431	1 army (5000 troops, 100 horses, 30 elephants)	Overall commander of the Hanthawaddy army that marched to Prome via Tharrawaddy. Put under arrest during a meeting with his Ava counterpart by the Ava side, breaking the protocol. Released only after a peace agreement was reached in 1431.

== Bibliography ==
- Aung-Thwin, Michael A. (2017). Myanmar in the Fifteenth Century. Honolulu: University of Hawai'i Press. ISBN 978-0-8248-6783-6.
- Burma Translation Society (1973). "Thamein Bayan". Myanma Swezon Kyan (in Burmese). Vol. 13 (1 ed.). Yangon: Sarpay Beikman. pp. 33–37.
- Fernquest, Jon (Spring 2006). "Rajadhirat's Mask of Command: Military Leadership in Burma (c. 1348–1421)" (PDF). SBBR. 4 (1).
- Fernquest, Jon (Autumn 2006). "Crucible of War: Burma and the Ming in the Tai Frontier Zone (1382–1454)" (PDF). SOAS Bulletin of Burma Research. 4 (2).
- Harvey, G. E. (1925). History of Burma: From the Earliest Times to 10 March 1824. London: Frank Cass & Co. Ltd.
- Kala, U (2006) [1724]. Maha Yazawin (in Burmese). Vol. 1–3 (4th printing ed.). Yangon: Ya-Pyei Publishing.
- Maha Sithu (2012) [1798]. Kyaw Win; Thein Hlaing (eds.). Yazawin Thit (in Burmese). Vol. 1–3 (2nd ed.). Yangon: Ya-Pyei Publishing.
- Ne Soe Htet (2011). Myanma Sit Theninga-Byuha Hnint Myanma Sit Bayin Thuyegaung Mya (in Burmese) (1 ed.). Yangon: Myo Myanmar Sarpay. pp. 211–215.
- Pan Hla, Nai (2005) [1968]. Razadarit Ayedawbon (in Burmese) (8th printing ed.). Yangon: Armanthit Sarpay.
- Phayre, Major Gen. Sir Arthur P. (1873). "The History of Pegu". Journal of the Asiatic Society of Bengal. 42. Oxford University.
- Royal Historical Commission of Burma (2003) [1832]. Hmannan Yazawin (in Burmese). Vol. 1–3. Yangon: Ministry of Information, Myanmar.
- Than Tun (2011). "Myanma Thamaing Ato-ahtwa (Burmese History Shorts)". Thamein Bayan Hso-Da Da-Ge-La (Was Thamein Bayan Real?) (in Burmese). Yangon: Gangaw Myaing Sarpay: 44–46.
