= Konbaung conquest of Arakan =

Military operation of the annexation of Arakan into Burma

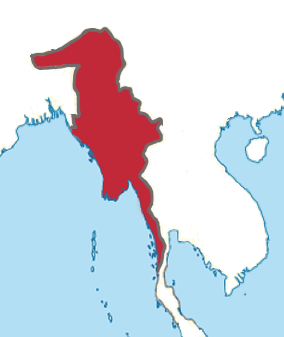
Date	January 1–2, 1785
Location	Arakan (present-day Rakhine State of Myanmar)
Result	Burmese victory
Territorial changes	Arakan is annexed under the Konbaung dynasty of Burma

Belligerents
Konbaung dynasty	Kingdom of Mrauk U

Commanders and leaders
Bodawpaya; Thado Minsaw	Maha Thammada

Units involved
Royal Burmese Army; Royal Burmese Navy	Royal Arakanese Army; Royal Arakanese Navy

Strength
20,000 men 2,500 cavalry 200 elephants	Some naval forces

Casualties and losses
Light	High (including most fled)

In late 1784, the Konbaung dynasty of Burma, under King Bodawpaya, launched a significant military campaign against the Kingdom of Arakan (now Rakhine State). Within a short time, the Royal Burmese Army captured Mrauk U, the capital of Arakan, in January 1785, effectively ending the Kingdom of Mrauk U, which had ruled for nearly 350 years.

== Background ==
The Konbaung Dynasty (1752–1885) was the last and one of the powerful dynasty of Burma. It unified the country and expanded its territory into Arakan, Manipur, Assam, and parts of Siam and Qing as well. The Mrauk U Kingdom (1429–1785), the dominant power in Arakan, was also actively involved in military campaigns beyond its borders, frequently clashing with Bengal and gaining control of regions like Chittagong and Cox's Bazar. The kingdom also extended its influence over Tripura and occasionally intervened in Assam and Bengal affairs, using its strong naval presence to control crucial trade routes in the Bay of Bengal.

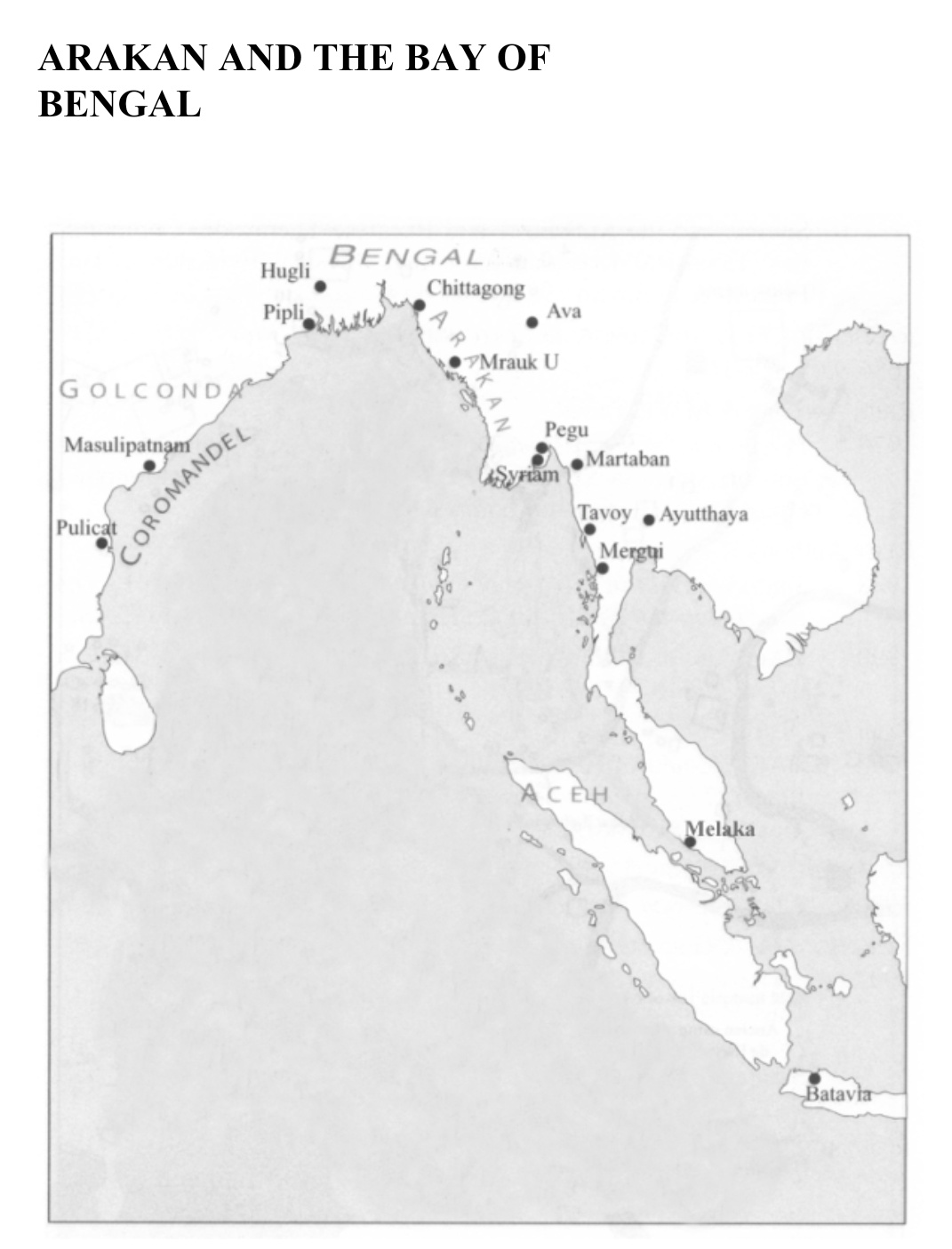
Arakan in Early 17th Century AD

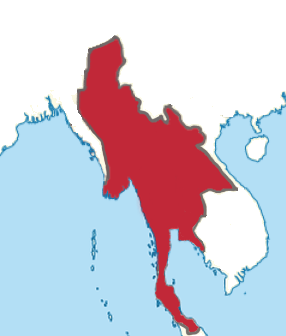
Konbaung Dynasty in 1767

King Bodawpaya sought to consolidate Burma’s western frontiers to preempt external threats. Arakan’s location along the Bay of Bengal made it a strategic gateway for maritime trade and a buffer against British colonial expansion in Bengal. Arakan, with its ancient Buddhist heritage and historic ties to Sri Lankan Buddhism, was portrayed as a "fallen" kingdom requiring purification under Konbaung rule. The annexation and shifting of Mahamuni Buddha Temple allowed Bodawpaya to present himself as a restorer of Buddhist order.

Mrauk U Kingdom had been weakened by decades of internal strife, including succession disputes and raids by Portuguese mercenaries. Bodawpaya exploited this vulnerability, framing the invasion as a "restoration of stability." Arakan’s fragmented elites, divided by factionalism, were unable to mount a unified resistance, enabling the Konbaung army to swiftly occupy Mrauk U.

== Invasion ==
Crown Prince Thado Minsaw led an invasion force of over 20,000 men, including 2,500 cavalry and 200 elephants, comprising both land and naval units. The invasion then commenced on December 2, 1784, with Burmese forces advancing through multiple routes across the Arakan Mountains. Facing minimal resistance, they captured the Arakanese capital, Mrauk-U, on January 2, 1785, effectively ending nearly five centuries of Arakanese independence.

Three divisions of the Burmese forces crossed the Arakan Yoma from three different passes, with Thado Minsaw's division advancing from its Minbu base. The fourth division was a flotilla that came up the Indian Ocean coastline from the former British base at Negrais. After securing southern Arakan, the Burmese forces landed on Ramree Island. The prince also attempted to repel the invaders, but with limited forces, he too was defeated and fled into the jungle. Following this, the Burmese forces took control of Ramree Island and set their sights on Mrauk U, the capital of northern Arakan. On 31 December 1784, they arrived and set up camp at Laungkyet, southeast of Mrauk U.

Meanwhile, the king of Arakan that time, Maha Thammada Raza gathered many nobles to discuss how to deal with the Burmese invasion. His brother-in-law, Kyaw Bon, advised him to make peace by offering his daughter to Bodawpaya, but Maha Thammada Raza refused and chose to fight the invaders. On the same day, 31 December 1784, he led his land and naval forces out of Mrauk U to attack the Burmese camp at Laungkyet. However, he was soundly defeated.

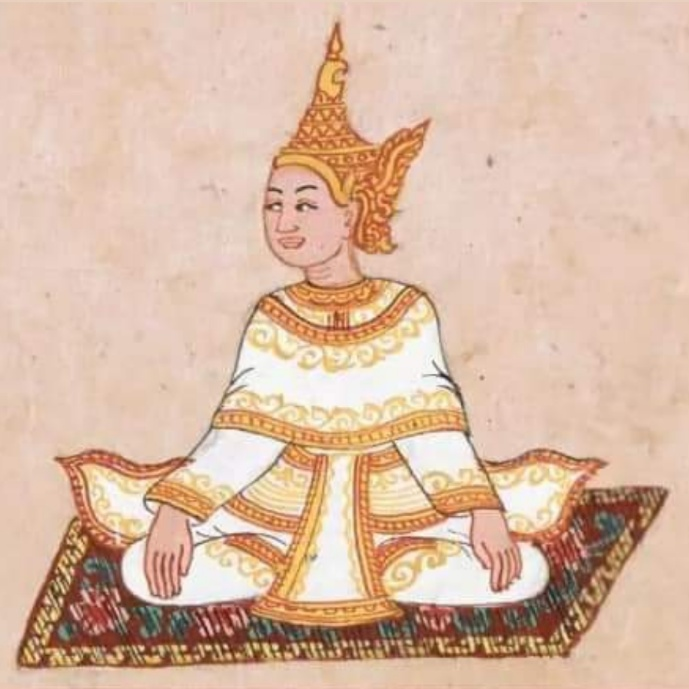
King Maha Thammeda, the last king of Arakan

Maha Thammada Raza and his family was brought to Amarapura, the capital of Konbaung Dynasty back then. Depressed, the last king of Arakan died a captive at Amarapura two years later.

After the Konbaung Dynasty's conquest, around 35,000 people from Rakhine fled to the neighboring Chittagong region of British Bengal to seek refuge under the British Raj.

== Aftermath ==
The annexation led to significant demographic changes, with many Arakanese fleeing to neighboring regions such as Bengal which is under then British Raj. The subsequent Burmese administration faced resistance and uprisings, contributing to instability that eventually drew British attention and led to the First Anglo-Burmese War in 1824.

Since then, Arakan has remained a part of British Burma and later became part of Myanmar.

== See also ==
- Mrauk U invasion of Pegu
- Sino-Burmese War
- Burmese–Siamese War (1765–1767)

== Sources ==
- Aye Chan (Autumn 2005). "The Development of a Muslim Enclave in Arakan (Rakhine) State of Burma (Myanmar)" (PDF). SOAS Bulletin of Burma Research. 3 (2). Archived from the original (PDF) on 12 July 2013.
- Myint-U, Thant (2001). The Making of Modern Burma. Cambridge University Press. ISBN 9780521799140.
- Myint-U, Thant (2006). The River of Lost Footsteps—Histories of Burma. Farrar, Straus and Giroux. ISBN 978-0-374-16342-6.
