= Sanda Thuriya =

Sanda Thuriya may refer to:

- Sanda Thuriya of Dhanyawadi
- Sanda Thuriya I
- Sanda Thuriya II
- Sanda Thuriya III

== See also ==
- Sanda Thumana
- Sanda Thaditha
- Sanda Thudhamma
