= Smin Upakaung the Elder =

15th-century military commander

Smin: Upakaung; သမိန် ဥပါကောင်း
- Born: c. 1380s Hanthawaddy kingdom
- Died: late November 1401; Tazaungmon 763 ME; Myede, Ava Kingdom
- Spouse: Tala Mi Saw
- Relatives: Smin Bayan (younger brother)
- Military career
- Allegiance: Royal Hanthawaddy Armed Forces
- Branch: Navy and Army
- Service years: 1401
- Rank: Commander (စစ်ကဲ, sitke)
- Commands: 2nd Vanguard Flotilla
- Conflicts: Ava–Hanthawaddy War (1401–1403)

Smin Upakaung the Elder (Burmese: သမိန် ဥပါကောင်း, Burmese pronunciation: [θəmèiɴ ʔṵ bà gáʊ̯ɴ]; c. 1380s–1401) was a Hanthawaddy commander who fought in the Second Ava–Hanthawaddy War. A son-in-law of King Razadarit, the commander died in action in the battle of Myede at the beginning of the war in 1401. He was the elder brother of Smin Bayan and the first husband of Princess Tala Mi Saw.

== Brief ==
Smin Upakaung was a Mon language title worn by successive commanders in the service of the monarchs of Hanthawaddy Pegu. This article is about the first of three Smin Upakaungs mentioned in the royal chronicles. (Note: Chronicles mention at least three men who wore the title Smin Upakaung: Smin Upakaung the Elder (died 1401); Smin Upakaung the Younger, who later became known as Smin Bayan; Smin Upakaung, the commander who succeeded the title after Smin Upakaung the Younger became Smin Bayan; his previous title was Minhla Kyawkhaung.)

Chronicles provide little information about his background except that he was married to Princess Tala Mi Saw by 1401. His personal name is not known. By the start of the Second Ava–Hanthawaddy War, he was known by his title of Smin Upakaung and served as a minister (အမတ်, amat) at the court of his father-in-law King Razadarit.

His wartime career was short. When the war began in November 1401, Upakaung commanded one of the three vanguard flotillas, under the overall command of Gen. Byat Za, that invaded the northern kingdom of Ava. His deputy commander was his younger brother Athayi. When the Hanthawaddy armada reached Myede, the invaders disembarked, and tried to take the fortified town. Upakaung subsequently was killed by an enemy gunshot (Note: The "gun" here probably was "a jingal, a metal tube about three feet long, mounted on a wooden stand, and throwing a ball, generally less than one pound weight".) from atop the walls of the town, and the attack was called off soon after.

His brother Athayi took over the command after his death, and was noticed for his effective commandership. After the first dry season campaign was over, c. May 1402, King Razadarit not only awarded Athayi the title of Smin Upakaung but also married off Princess Tala Mi Saw to the new Upakaung.

== Bibliography ==
- Burma Translation Society (1973). "Thamein Bayan". Myanma Swezon Kyan (in Burmese). Vol. 13 (1 ed.). Yangon: Sarpay Beikman. pp. 33–37.
- Kala, U (2006) [1724]. Maha Yazawin (in Burmese). Vol. 1–3 (4th printing ed.). Yangon: Ya-Pyei Publishing.
- Maha Sithu (2012) [1798]. Myint Swe; Kyaw Win; Thein Hlaing (eds.). Yazawin Thit (in Burmese). Vol. 1–3 (2nd printing ed.). Yangon: Ya-Pyei Publishing.
- Pan Hla, Nai (2005) [1968]. Razadarit Ayedawbon (in Burmese) (8th printing ed.). Yangon: Armanthit Sarpay.
- Phayre, Arthur P. (1967) [1883]. History of Burma. London: Susil Gupta.
- Royal Historical Commission of Burma (2003) [1832]. Hmannan Yazawin (in Burmese). Vol. 1–3. Yangon: Ministry of Information, Myanmar.
