= Thirithu =

Thirithu Raza သီရိသုရာဇာ

King of Arakan
- Reign: 28 October 1761 - 4 February 1762
- Coronation: 28 October 1761
- Predecessor: Nara Apaya
- Successor: Sanda Parama
- Born: 1729 CE
- Died: 4 February 1762 CE (aged 33); Mrauk U
- Consort: Tansaung Miphaya
- Issue: Motesate tapote (မုတ်ဆိတ်တပုတ်)
- Father: Nara Apaya
- Mother: unknown
- Religion: Theravada Buddhism

Thirithu (Arakanese:သီရီသု, whose personal name was Shwe Yauk (ရွှေယောက်), was a 42nd king of the Mrauk-U Dynasty of Arakan. He died of smallpox 3 months later after becoming king.

== Bibliography ==
- Harvey, G. E. (1925). History of Burma: From the Earliest Times to 10 March 1824. London: Frank Cass & Co. Ltd.
- Myat Soe, ed. (1964). Myanma Swezon Kyan (in Burmese). Vol. 9 (1 ed.). Yangon: Sarpay Beikman.
- Myint-U, Thant (2006). The River of Lost Footsteps—Histories of Burma. Farrar, Straus and Giroux. ISBN 978-0-374-16342-6.
- Sandamala Linkara, Ashin (1931). Rakhine Yazawinthit Kyan (in Burmese). Vol. 1–2 (1997 ed.). Yangon: Tetlan Sarpay.
