= Sanda Wimala II =

Sanda Wimala II စန္ဒဝိမလရာဇာ

King of Arakan
- Reign: 23 April 1777 - 2 June 1777
- Coronation: 23 April 1777
- Predecessor: Sanda Thumana
- Usurper: Sanda Thaditha
- Generals: Do We; Thar ma Tone Kyaw Wai
- Born: 1731 CE
- Died: unknown
- Consort: Dar Phyu (ဒါဖြူ)
- Issue: unknown
- Father: unknown
- Mother: unknown
- Religion: Theravada Buddhism

Sanda Wimala II, whose personal name was Poe Shwe (ပိုးရွှေ), was a king of the Mrauk-U Dynasty of Arakan.

== Early life ==
Poe Shwe was originally a minister under Sanda Thumana. The king was seen as a tyrant and many rebellions occurred under his reign; eventually, in April 1777, Poe Shwe joined the rebels.

The king sent his general and brother-in-law Ananta Thirikyawhtin, along with the royal army, to subdue the rebellion. They set up camp at Kantha Yekyaw, where the rebels attacked them. The general was severely wounded and retreated to Mrauk U, dying four days later of his wounds. Sanda Thumana fled from the palace when word of the defeat reached him.

== Reign ==
The next day, the rebels occupied the capital and Poe Shwe took the throne, assuming the title Sanda Wimala II. Forty days later, Aung Son of Ramree Island arrived with an army to conquer Mrauk U. Sanda Wimala II was defeated in his turn and fled to Shite-thaung Temple. Aung Son took the throne as Sanda Thaditha, later forcing Sanda Wimala II to become a monk. The former king is not mentioned again in the Arakanese chronicles and his date of death is unknown.

== Bibliography ==
- Harvey, G. E. (1925). History of Burma: From the Earliest Times to 10 March 1824. London: Frank Cass & Co. Ltd.
- Myat Soe, ed. (1964). Myanma Swezon Kyan (in Burmese). Vol. 9 (1 ed.). Yangon: Sarpay Beikman.
- Myint-U, Thant (2006). The River of Lost Footsteps—Histories of Burma. Farrar, Straus and Giroux. ISBN 978-0-374-16342-6.
- Sandamala Linkara, Ashin (1931). Rakhine Yazawinthit Kyan (in Burmese). Vol. 1–2 (1997 ed.). Yangon: Tetlan Sarpay.
