= Nara Apaya =

Nara Apaya Raza နရအဘယရာဇာ

King of Arakan
- Reign: 23 January 1743 - 28 October 1761
- Coronation: 23 January 1743
- Predecessor: Madarit
- Successor: Thirithu
- Regent: Gu Ta (Chief Minister)
- Born: 1694 CE; Set Thar Village, Mrauk U (Tuesday born)
- Died: 28 October 1761 CE (aged 67); Mrauk U
- Consort: Saw Thandar Wai (စောသန္တာဝေ)
- Issue: Thirithu, Sanda Parama Saw Bhone Kway and others
Names
- Shwenanthakhin Yout Swaypa Min Nara Apaya Raza ရွှေနန်းသခင် ရုပ်ဆွေဖမင်း နရအဘယရာဇာ
- House: Narapawara
- Religion: Theravada Buddhism

Nara Apaya (Burmese: နရအဘယ; 1694 - 28 October 1761) was a 41st king of the Mrauk-U Dynasty of Arakan from 1743 until his death in 1761. Born from a poor background, he inherited the throne from his nephew. He was the longest reigning monarch of Mrauk-U, of the last period.

During his reign, the country faced severe economic and political crisis that in order to solve, the king launched military campaign against the neighboring countries. The king lost of control of south of Kyeintali fell to local rebellion. The standard Arakanese calendar was instituted during his reign.

== Early life ==
The future king later grew up in the remote areas of Mrauk U. His later career as becoming a general in the royal court. His personal name was Yout Sway Pa (ရုပ်ဆွေဖ), named after his daughter who was called 'Yout Sway' also known as Saw Bhone Kway.

He later studied with royal members of the Mrauk-U ruling family.

== Reign ==
Upon his consolidation of power, the Arakanese raided the cities of Bassein, Dala, Danubyu and Hinthada as much of lower Irrawaddy valley in 1744 which were nominal vassals of Smim Htaw Buddhaketi. The invasion initiated by his chief minister led 300 fleets sailed down to Kyeintali, from there the Arakanese forces reached town of Dala. The Hanthawaddy King sent the viceroy of Sittaung to confront the raids, the resistants forces soon fells as one Arakanese viceroy counterattack using Nyaungbin Tree the crush the incoming forces which left Hanthawaddy forces in disarray. The Arakanese captured Mon lord of Ngawon and his 5 concubines and processed many war loots. The King wrote a poet about upon returning to his state.

Around early 1750s, Konbaung-Hanthawaddy War rage on, however Arakan remained neutral but saw many Avans refugees seeking shelter and fleeing the war. King Apaya provided shelter and food to the refugees and settled them on a place called 'Pyaing Chaung' (ပြိုင်းချောင်း), on the west bank of Kaladan River.

One military expedition was launched against Bengal in 1751. The Mughal governor of Dhaka heavily resisted and the Arakanese forces retreated. In the following year, son of Sanda Wizaya named 'Tha ma', (သာမ) collaborated with Bengali Muslims was sent to retaliate against the king of Arakan. He died on way from Dhaka and the Muslims retreated. His chief minister, Gu-Tha routed from coastal areas of Chittagong and Ramu, and from there his forces attacked the remaining Muslims and captured large portions of slaves and cattle to be sold at the market.

In the year 1760, King Apaya sent his generals to defeat a rebel named 'Bo Nyo' inciting rebellion in the mountainous coastal town of Kyeintali. The fleets of the general has damaged and suffered losses, the rebel roamed freely. The army left a garrison at Sin Gaung but few months later the garrison becomes disaffected. Bo Nyo rebels attacked the garrison and one viceroy was killed. The Kingdom lost control of south of Kyeintali that would be governed by own local lords.

There was a seven days earthquake on the month of Thadingyut, 8 days on the month of Tagu, the king and the ministers withhold ceremony to pray for the safety of the kingdom. King Apaya took the title of "Nara Apaya Raza Mingyi" and built many Buddhist monasteries and temples for the religious faith and notably Lay kway-Taung Pagoda west of the capital. The King died soon after this and was succeeded by his son, Shwe Yout who reigned for 3 months before dying of smallpox.

== Death ==
The King died on Monday of 28th October 1761 (1st waning of Tazaungmon, 1123 ME), he was aged 67 and the oldest monarch to ruled Mrauk-U Kingdom.

== Bibliography ==
- Harvey, G. E. (1925). History of Burma: From the Earliest Times to 10 March 1824. London: Frank Cass & Co. Ltd.
- Myat Soe, ed. (1964). Myanma Swezon Kyan (in Burmese). Vol. 9 (1 ed.). Yangon: Sarpay Beikman.
- Myint-U, Thant (2006). The River of Lost Footsteps—Histories of Burma. Farrar, Straus and Giroux. ISBN 978-0-374-16342-6.
- Sandamala Linkara, Ashin (1931). Rakhine Yazawinthit Kyan (in Burmese). Vol. 1–2 (1997 ed.). Yangon: Tetlan Sarpay.
