= Sanda Thaditha =

Sanda Thaditha Raza စန္ဒသတိဿရာဇာ Dammariz Raza ဓမ္မရာဇ်ရာဇာ
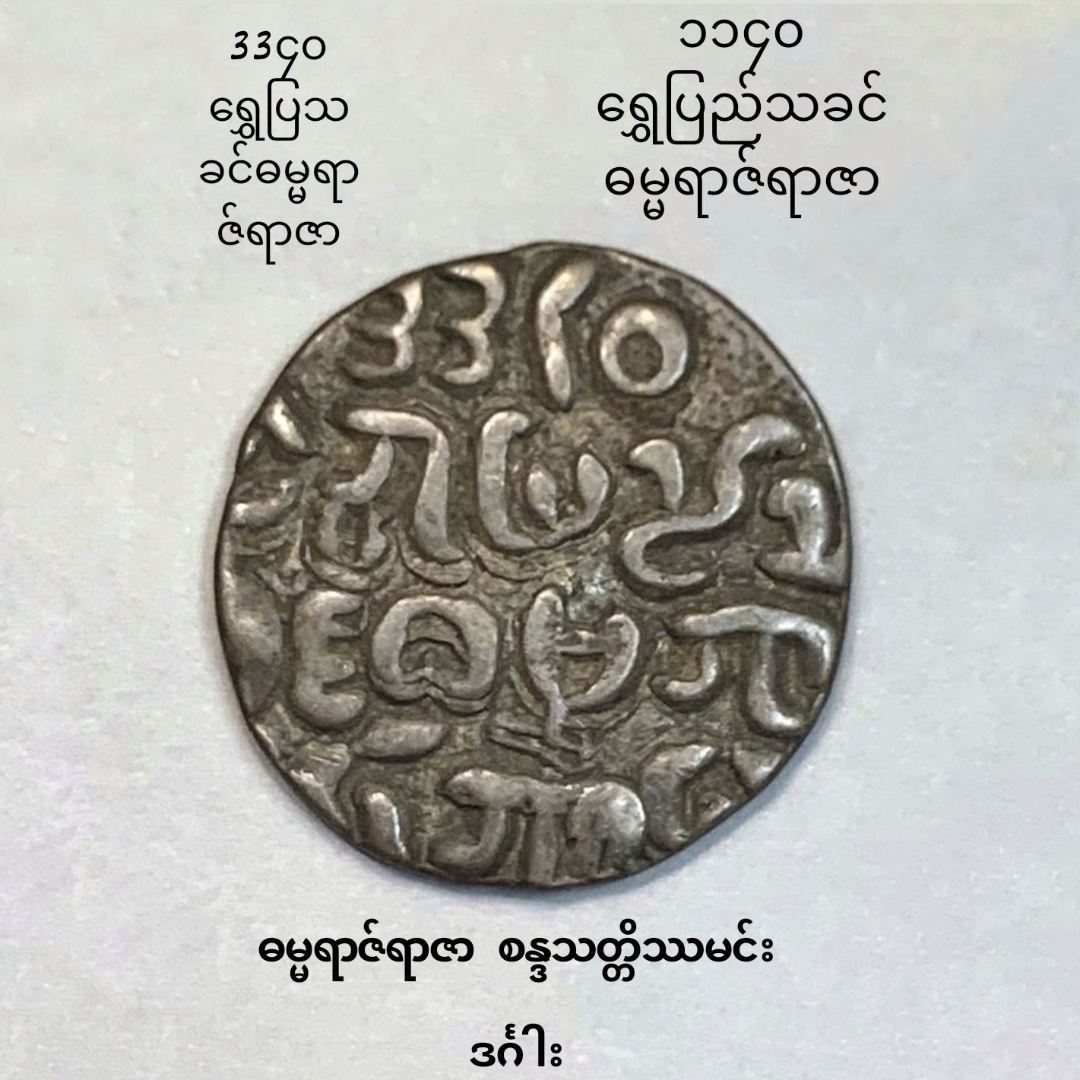

King of Arakan
- Reign: 5 June 1777 - 2 November 1782
- Coronation: 2 June 1777
- Predecessor: Sanda Wimala II
- successor: Maha Thammada
- Born: 1727; Zinchaung, Ramree Island, Arakan
- Died: 2 November 1782 (aged 55); Mrauk U
- Consort: Sein Khine; Aung Mae; Gaung Pon Mae; Chi Mae
- Issue: Thet San Shwe; Thotedaw U Kalarphyu
Names
- Shwenanthakhin Sanda Thaditha Raza ရွှေနန်းသခင် စန္ဒသတိဿရာဇာ Shwepyithakhin Dammarit Raza ရွှေပြည်သခင် ဓမ္မရာဇ်ရာဇာ
- House: Ramree
- Father: unknown
- Mother: unknown
- Religion: Theravada Buddhism

Sanda Thaditha, (Arakanese:စန္ဒသတိဿ, 1727 - 2 November 1782) whose personal name was Aung Sone (အောင်စုန်), was a king of the Mrauk-U Dynasty of Arakan. Unlike the previous kings of Arakan, Sanda Thaditha was a native of Ramree Island.

== Early life ==
According to the Arakanese chronicles, in 1774, twelve villages on Ramree Island revolted against the heavy taxes imposed by King Sanda Thumana. The rebels were initially led by four generals - Sanay Phyu, Lar Phyu, Maung Htwe, and Aung Son (Sanda Thaditha) - but Aung Son eventually eliminated the others and assumed sole command of the army.

On 10 February 1775, Sanda Thumana sent his general Ananta Thirikyawhtin and a large army to subdue the rebels, who had been joined by inhabitants of Cheduba Island. However, the general was defeated and forced to retreat. On 23 April 1777 the king was overthrown by rebel leaders Poe Shwe and Do We. The next day, Poe Shwe was enthroned as Sanda Wimala II.

In the same year, Ba htaw, lord of Thandwe, asked Aung Son to conquer and rule Arakan. Aung Son agreed and by May 25 his army had arrived near the capital, Mrauk U, and set up camp. Sanda Wimala II sent his forces against the invaders, but his army was defeated and suffered heavy losses. He fled to Shite-thaung Temple for refuge, later becoming a monk.

Aung Son occupied Mrauk U on 2 June 1777 and took the throne as Sanda Thaditha Raza (စန္ဒသတိဿရာဇာ). His queen was Sein Khine and Thet San Shwe became crown prince.

== Reign ==
His reign lasted five years, during which he faced twenty-five revolts. His campaigns against the rebels were successful but did not eliminate the unrest completely. Even the heir apparent, Thet San Shwe, raised a rebellion on Ramree Island against his father.

The kingdom suffered from widespread lawlessness, and in June–July 1782 there were epidemics of smallpox and cholera. On 2 November 1782, Sanda Thaditha died, leaving many affairs unsettled. He was succeeded by Maha Thammada, the husband of his niece.

== Bibliography ==
- Harvey, G. E. (1925). History of Burma: From the Earliest Times to 10 March 1824. London: Frank Cass & Co. Ltd.
- Myat Soe, ed. (1964). Myanma Swezon Kyan (in Burmese). Vol. 9 (1 ed.). Yangon: Sarpay Beikman.
- Myint-U, Thant (2006). The River of Lost Footsteps—Histories of Burma. Farrar, Straus and Giroux. ISBN 978-0-374-16342-6.
- Sandamala Linkara, Ashin (1931). Rakhine Yazawinthit Kyan (in Burmese). Vol. 1–2 (1997 ed.). Yangon: Tetlan Sarpay.
