= Maha Thammada =

King of Mrauk U (r. 1782–1785)

Maha Thammada Raza မဟာသမ္မတရာဇာ Aggoponnyazaw Raza အဂ္ဂေါပုညာဇောရာဇာ
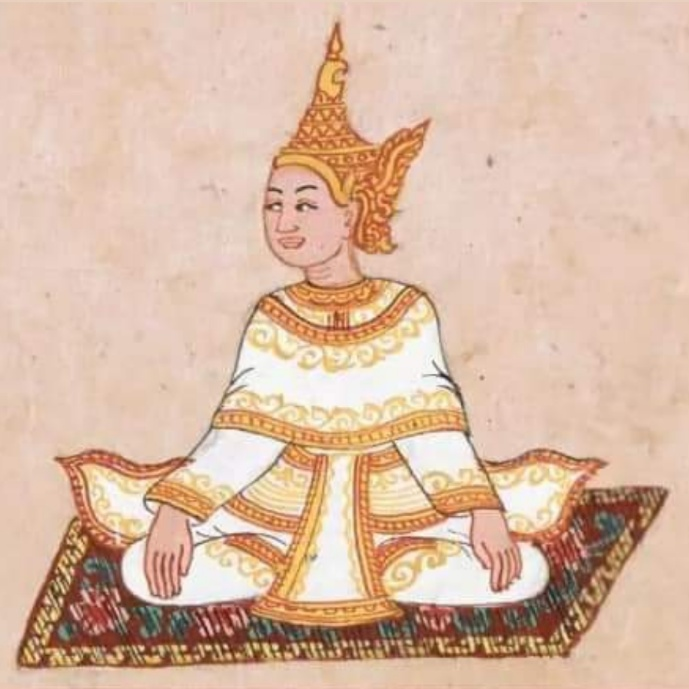

King of Mrauk U
- Reign: 2 December 1782 – 9 January 1785
- Coronation: Monday, 14th waning of Tazaungmon, 1144 ME
- Predecessor: Sanda Thaditha
- Successor: Monarchy dissolved Nandapakyan (Burmese governor)
- Born: c. May 1742; Zinchaung, Ramree Island, Kingdom of Mrauk U
- Died: 1786 (aged 44); Amarapura, Konbaung dynasty (now Myanmar)
- Burial: Amarapura
- Consort: Saw Mae Pon; Mya Thandar; Others
- Issue: Wet Taung; Ye Baw; Mhauktawgyi; Mhauktawlat
Names
- Shwenanthakhin Maha Thammada Raza ရွှေနန်းသခင် မဟာသမ္မတရာဇာ Shwenanthakhin Aggoponnyazawraza ရွှေနန်းသခင် အဂ္ဂေါပုညာဇောရာဇာ
- House: Ramree
- Religion: Theravada Buddhism

Maha Thammada (Rakhine: မဟာသမ္မတ; c. May 1742 – 1786), born Thado Aung (Rakhine: သတိုးအောင်), was the final monarch of the Kingdom of Mrauk U, reigning from 1782 to 1785. He was the last Arakanese monarch and 48th king of Mrauk-U, a coastal area of Arakan and a former state in Myanmar.

When Sanda Thaditha died in 1782, nobles gathered and enthroned Thado Aung, who was a Duke of Ramree, held the post of Letwemyan (Burmese: လက်ဝဲမြန် အမတ်) and was the nephew-in-law of deceased King Sanda Thaditha. Thado Aung assumed the title of Maha Thammada Raza and ascended the throne, with his Queen Saw Mae Pon (Burmese: စောမယ်ပုံ). He appointed his brother in law, Kyaw Bon (Burmese: ကျော်ပုံ), to the position of General and made his younger brother, Chit Hla Shwe (Burmese: ချစ်လှရွှေ), crown prince.

== Reign ==
During Raza's reign, he controlled only the capital Mrauk U and surrounding areas. Many parts of the country were under control of rebels. Among these rebels, Kyaw Htwe (Burmese: ကျော်ထွေး) was the most powerful and controlled the southern parts of Arakan.

Raza tried to suppress the rebellions with the help of General Kyaw Bon. Many rebels, including Kyaw Htwe, soon made peace with the King and recognized his authority. They paid tribute to Raza but still maintained control of their land.

The country enjoyed a short season of stability until it faced a severe flood in the summer of 1784. These flood inundated the alluvial delta of Kaladan river for a week, destroying many rice fields and causing many deaths. The economy of Arakan was crippled, and the chaos was subsequently followed by disease and famine.

On 30 June 1784, Maha Thammada Raza visited the famous temple of Mahamuni Buddha. On 18 September, he held second coronation ceremony and took the title of Aggopuññājorājā (Burmese: အဂ္ဂေါပုညာဇောရာဇာ).

== Burmese invasion ==
Meanwhile, Amarapura (Burma) was preparing for invasion of Arakan and stored up paddy secretly on mountain routes. In October 1784, Burmese forces led by Crown Prince Thado Minsaw consisted of four divisions, totaling 30,000 men (including 2500 cavalry and 200 elephants), began their match towards Arakan. Three divisions crossed the Arakan Yoma from three different passes with Thado Minsaw's division crossing the mountains from its Minbu base. The fourth was a flotilla which came up from the Indian Ocean coastline from the Erstwhile British base at Cape Negrais.

Burmese forces first tried to take southern Arakan which was controlled by Kyaw Htwe. Htwe, Lord of Tan Lhway (Burmese: တန်းလွှဲ), tried alone to resist the invading troops. He had initial success but was unsuccessful due to lack of reinforcements from other Lords. He soon faced defeat and fled to northern Arakan with his family. Southern Arakan, including the city of Thandwe, then fell into the hands of Burmese forces.

After taking southern Arakan, Burmese forces landed on Ramree Island, controlled by Prince Thet San Shwe (Burmese: သက်စံရွှေ). Shwe also tried to drive Burmese invaders out of his lands, but with insufficient numbers to repel the enemy he also faced defeat and fled to jungle. Burmese forces occupied Ramree Island and aimed for next target—Mrauk U, the capital of northern Arakan. On 31 December 1784, Burmese forces arrived and set up camp at Laungkyet, southeast of Mrauk U.

Meanwhile, Raza gathered many nobles and asked their advice to deal with Burmese invasion. His brother in law, Kyaw Bon, attempted to persuade Raza to make peace with the Burmese by giving his daughter to Bodawpaya. However, he ultimately tried to drive the invaders out by force. On 31 December 1784, Raza led his land and naval forces out of Mrauk U and attacked the Burmese camp at Laungkyet. However, he suffered a severe defeat and retreated back to the city. That same day, his most trusted general, Kyaw Bon, burned down his own house and fled the city.

When Maha Thammada Raza discovered his brother-in-law had left him, he abandoned the royal capital. That night, Raza fled to Kyunthaya Island in 30 boats together with his family and his subjects.

== Fall of Mrauk U ==
On 1 January 1785, the Burmese forces captured the city of Mrauk U and thus ended nearly five centuries of Rakhine independence. Eight days later, the Burmese forces captured Raza and his family hiding on Kyunthaya Island with the help of traitors. Only Crown Prince Chit Hla Shwe escaped, hiding in the jungle.

After the fall of the Kingdom of Mrauk U, looting and destruction followed. The royal palace was burned to the ground. Much of Arakan's cultural and intellectual heritage was lost. Many people were deported forcibly to Burma. The Mahamuni Buddha, the very symbol of Arakanese sovereignty, was forcibly brought to Amarapura. Arakan was annexed and ruled through four governorships (Mrauk U, Ramree, Man Aung, Thantwe), each backed by a garrison.

== Death ==
Maha Thammada Raza and his family were brought to Amarapura. Depressed, the last king of Arakan died a captive at Amarapura two years later.

== Bibliography ==
- Harvey, G. E. (1925). History of Burma: From the Earliest Times to 10 March 1824. London: Frank Cass & Co. Ltd.
- Myat Soe, ed. (1964). Myanma Swezon Kyan (in Burmese). Vol. 9 (1 ed.). Yangon: Sarpay Beikman.
- Myint-U, Thant (2006). The River of Lost Footsteps—Histories of Burma. Farrar, Straus and Giroux. ISBN 978-0-374-16342-6.
- Sandamala Linkara, Ashin (1931). Rakhine Yazawinthit Kyan (in Burmese). Vol. 1–2 (1997 ed.). Yangon: Tetlan Sarpay.
