= Sanda Thumana =

Sanda Thumana Raza စန္ဒသုမနရာဇာ

King of Arakan
- Reign: 18th of January, 1774 - 22nd of April, 1777
- Coronation: 18th of January, 1774
- Predecessor: Apaya
- usurper: Sanda Wimala II
- General: Ananta Thirikyawhtin
- Born: 1723 CE
- Died: May, 1777 CE (aged 54); Min Htwet Hse Wa (မင်းထွက်ဆည်ဝ), Mrauk U
- Burial: May, 1777 CE; Patein Island
- Consort: Panthuzar (ပန်းသူဇာ)
- Issue: Kyaw San, Yet Thae Mae
Names
- Shwenanthakhin Sanda Thumana Raza ရွှေနန်းသခင် စန္ဒသုမနရာဇာ
- Father: unknown
- Mother: unknown
- Religion: Theravada Buddhism

Sanda Thumana (Rakhine:စန္ဒာသုမန;, whose personal name was Ngathaukkya (ငသောကြာ), was a king of the Mrauk-U Dynasty of Arakan. He was unable to rule the kingdom well and many rebellions occurred during his reign.

== Early life ==
Ngathaukkya was originally a general under the king Apaya. According to Arakanese chronicles, Apaya's son, crown prince Ye Baw, murdered Ngathaukkya's brother. This enraged Ngathaukkya and he wanted to take revenge against the murderer and Apaya, so he left the capital, went to Sittwe Island, and there he recruited Bengali Muslims into his army. His forces marched and set up camp at Urittaung.

Apaya, knowing the enemy forces were stronger than his own, tried to negotiate with Ngathaukkya. However, Ngathaukkya ignored the negotiation and attacked the capital. On 18 January 1774, he occupied the capital, Mrauk U, and King Apaya was killed during battle. The next day, Ngathaukkya ascended the throne and became the king of Arakan with the title of Sanda Thumana Raza.

== Reign ==
During the reign of King Sanda Thumana, many revolts occurred throughout the kingdom. Some months after his coronation, Ramree Island rebelled against him because of heavy taxes and soon Cheduba Island joined in revolt.

In the capital Mrauk U, Sanda Thumana murdered ministers he hated and therefore he was seen as a tyrant. Many ministers and nobles hated him; some even tried to assassinate him, but they failed.

In August, 1775, Sanda Thumana held a second coronation ceremony and built the city pillar. In September, Bengali Muslims of Sittwe Island rebelled and marched towards Mrauk U. They entered the capital, slaughtered the townsfolk and tried to take the palace. At that time, Sanda Thumana did not have enough men to repel the enemy. He encouraged the palace maids and monks to fight in battle. Eventually, the Bengali Muslims lost the battle and fled to Bengal with their families.

In his later reign, Sanda Thumana depended on his brother-in-law and general, Ananta Thirikyawhtin, to suppress the rebellions. However, in April, 1777, Ananta Thirikyawhtin was wounded in a battle against the rebels and later died. After his general died of wounds, Sanda Thumana grew frightened and fled the palace on 22 April.

Three rebel leaders, Do We, Thar ma, and Tone Kyaw Wai, marched and took Mrauk U. They enthroned Poe Shwe, who once was the former king's minister, with the title of Sanda Wimala II.

== Death ==
The ex-king, Sanda Thumana, tried to flee but was caught and sent to Sanda Wimala II. Sanda Wimala II forced Sanda Thumana to become a monk and live in Shite-thaung Temple.

After he became a monk, Sanda Thumana made his daughter, Yet Thae Mae (married to Do We), one of three rebel leaders. This caused other two rebel leaders to become resentful and in May 1777, they murdered Sanda Thumana at Min Htwet Hse Wa.

According to Arakanese chronicles, Sanda Thumana had a son named Kyaw San (ကျော်စံ). When Mrauk U kingdom was annexed by Bodawpaya, Kyaw San (ကျော်စံ) also was taken captive to Amarapura along with the Arakanese royal family.

== Bibliography ==
- Harvey, G. E. (1925). History of Burma: From the Earliest Times to 10 March 1824. London: Frank Cass & Co. Ltd.
- Myat Soe, ed. (1964). Myanma Swezon Kyan (in Burmese). Vol. 9 (1 ed.). Yangon: Sarpay Beikman.
- Myint-U, Thant (2006). The River of Lost Footsteps—Histories of Burma. Farrar, Straus and Giroux. ISBN 978-0-374-16342-6.
- Sandamala Linkara, Ashin (1931). Rakhine Yazawinthit Kyan (in Burmese). Vol. 1–2 (1997 ed.). Yangon: Tetlan Sarpay.
