= Tala Mi Saw =

Tala Mi Saw တလမည်စော

Governor of Martaban
- Reign: 1442/43 – ?
- Predecessor: Binnya Kyan (as viceroy)
- Successor: ?
- Monarch: Binnya Ran I
- Born: c. late 1380s Pegu (Bago); Hanthawaddy kingdom
- Died: Unknown; Martaban (Mottama)? Hanthawaddy kingdom
- Spouse: Smin Upakaung the Elder (?–1401); Smin Bayan (m. 1402)
- House: Hanthawaddy Pegu
- Father: Razadarit
- Religion: Theravada Buddhism

Tala Mi Saw (Burmese: တလမည်စော, pronounced [təlɑ̯ mì sɔ́]) was a princess of Hanthawaddy Pegu. A daughter of King Razadarit (r. 1384–1421), Saw was married to Gen. Smin Bayan. She may have been appointed governor of Martaban in 1442 or 1443 by her brother King Binnya Ran I, after the death of her other brother Viceroy Binnya Kyan. (Note: (Phayre 1873: 120) and (Aung-Thwin 2017: 262) say that Binnya Kyan was succeeded by his sister who was married to a high ranking official. Neither source explicitly names the sister. The chronicle Razadarit Ayedawbon (Pan Hla 2005) mentions only three daughters of Razadarit: Tala Mi Kyaw, Tala Mi Saw and Shin Saw Pu. The succeeding sister could not be Tala Mi Kyaw, who per (Pan Hla 2005: 224) was captured by Ava forces in 1402, and was never returned. Nor could she be Princess Shin Saw Pu, who had been unmarried since 1429, and later became queen regnant of Hanthawaddy per (Hmannan Vol. 2 2003: 92). None of the main chronicles mentions Shin Saw Pu's stay at Martaban in any case. This leaves Tala Mi Saw, who per (Pan Hla 2005: 224) was married to the famous general Smin Bayan.)

== Bibliography ==
- Aung-Thwin, Michael A. (2017). Myanmar in the Fifteenth Century. Honolulu: University of Hawai'i Press. ISBN 978-0-8248-6783-6.
- Maha Sithu (2012) [1798]. Kyaw Win; Thein Hlaing (eds.). Yazawin Thit (in Burmese). Vol. 1–3 (2nd ed.). Yangon: Ya-Pyei Publishing.
- Pan Hla, Nai (2005) [1968]. Razadarit Ayedawbon (in Burmese) (8th ed.). Yangon: Armanthit Sarpay.
- Phayre, Arthur P. (1873). "The History of Pegu". Journal of the Asiatic Society of Bengal. 42. Oxford University.
- Royal Historical Commission of Burma (2003) [1832]. Hmannan Yazawin (in Burmese). Vol. 1–3. Yangon: Ministry of Information, Myanmar.

Tala Mi Saw Hanthawaddy Dynasty Born: c. late 1380s Died: ?
Royal titles
Preceded by Binnya Kyan of Martaban as viceroy	Governor of Martaban; 1442/43–?	Succeeded by ?
