= Burmese Encyclopedia =

Encyclopedia published by the Burma Translation Society

The Burmese Encyclopedia (Burmese: မြန်မာ့ စွယ်စုံကျမ်း) is an encyclopedia published by the Burma Translation Society under the direction of former Burmese Prime Minister U Nu. The project began in 1947, and the first volume was later published via Stephen Austin & Sons Ltd, Hertford, Great Britain. Each of the fifteen volumes has approximately 500 pages. The last volume of the first edition was published in 1976, and was followed by yearly updates.

After the 1962 military coup of General Ne Win, the editing and publication of the Encyclopedia came to a halt. Yearly one additional cyclopedia book was published by the Burma Translation Society.

The online Burmese Wikipedia contains content that is mostly re-type from the original Burmese Encyclopedia.
