= Thant Myint-U =

Writer and historian

- သန့်မြင့်ဦး
- Born: 31 January 1966 (age 60); New York City, New York, U.S.
- Education: Harvard University; Paul H. Nitze School of Advanced International Studies; Johns Hopkins University; University of Cambridge
- Known for: Historian; Conservationist (colonial architecture)
- Spouse: Sofia Busch
- Children: Thurayn Myint-U
- Parent(s): Tyn Myint-U; Aye Aye Thant
- Relatives: U Thant (grandfather); Khin Lay Myint-U (sister); A-thi Myint-U (sister); Aye Myint Myint-U (sister)
- Awards: Fukuoka Grand Prize; Padma Shri

Thant Myint-U (Burmese: သန့်မြင့်ဦး [θa̰ɰ̃ mjɪ̰ɰ̃ ʔú]; born 31 January 1966) is an historian, writer, grandson of former United Nations Secretary-General U Thant, former UN official, former Myanmar peace process mediator, and an Honorary Fellow of Trinity College, Cambridge. He has authored five books, including The River of Lost Footsteps: A Personal History of Burma and Where China Meets India: Burma and the New Crossroads of Asia. He founded the Yangon Heritage Trust in 2012 to protect built heritage and promote urban planning in the Burmese commercial capital of Yangon. He is also a Distinguished Visiting Scholar at Christ's College, Cambridge and United Nations Special Adviser on Humanitarian Diplomacy.

== Life and education ==
Thant Myint-U was born in New York City to Burmese parents. Through his father, Tyn Myint-U, Thant is a descendant of the Konbaung Dynasty. He grew up in Riverdale, Bronx at the home of his maternal grandfather, the then-Secretary-General of the United Nations U Thant. From 1971 to 1980, he studied at Riverdale Country School, a private college-preparatory day school in the Bronx. He graduated from International School Bangkok in 1983. He has three sisters.

Thant earned a B.A. in government and economics from Harvard University, an MA in international relations and international economics from Johns Hopkins University, and his PhD in history from Cambridge University in 1996. From 1996 to 1999, he was a Fellow of Trinity College, Cambridge, where he taught history.

== Career ==
He served on three UN peacekeeping operations. He first served as a human rights officer from 1992 to 1993 at the UN Transitional Authority for Cambodia in Phnom Penh. In 1994, he was the spokesman for the UN Protection Force in the former Yugoslavia, based in Sarajevo. In 1996, he was a political adviser in the Office of the UN's Special Representative for Bosnia and Herzegovina.

In 2000, he joined the UN Secretariat in New York. He worked first at the Office for the Coordination of Humanitarian Affairs, then at the United Nations Department of Political Affairs, and at the Policy Planning Unit as a chief in 2004. During this time, he was a member of the secretariat of the Secretary-General's Panel on Threats, Challenges and Change (High Level Threat Panel). From the late 2005 to early 2006, he was briefly a senior officer at the Executive Office of the Secretary-General.

Aside from being chairman of the Yangon Heritage Trust, he was, from 2011 to 2015, a member of the National Economic and Social Advisory Council, special adviser to the Myanmar government for the peace process at the Myanmar Peace Centre, senior research fellow of the Myanmar Development Resources Institute, and member of the Fund Board of the (Myanmar) Livelihoods and Food Security Trust Fund.

During a December 2019 book tour in the US, Thant expressed his forebodings about Myanmar's future. In an interview with Singapore's The Straits Times, Thant remarked that the threat of climate change made him pessimistic about the country's future. "I think whatever we think of [Myanmar's] ledger in general, perhaps it comes to 50/50," he said. "When you add on what is almost certainly going to be the impact of global climate change on Burma, I think it's hard to be too optimistic right now."

== Works ==
Thant has written extensively for The New York Times, The Washington Post, the Los Angeles Times the International Herald Tribune, the London Review of Books, the New Statesman, the Far Eastern Economic Review, Time and The Times Literary Supplement. He was awarded the "Asia Pacific Awards" (Asian Affairs Research Council and Mainichi Newspapers) "Special Prize" in November 2014 for Where China Meets India. His book The Hidden History of Burma was released in November 2019. It was chosen as one of the New York Times "Top Books of 2019" and a

- Thant Myint-U (9 September 2025). Peacemaker: U Thant and the Forgotten Quest for a Just World (1st ed.). New York: W. W. Norton & Company. ISBN 978-1324051978.
- Thant Myint-U (12 November 2019). The Hidden History of Burma: Race, Capitalism, and the Crisis of Democracy in the 21st Century (1st ed.). New York: W. W. Norton & Company. ISBN 978-1324003298.
- Thant Myint-U (18 September 2018). Where China Meets India: Burma and the New Crossroads of Asia (1st ed.). New York: Farrar, Straus and Giroux. ISBN 978-0374533526.
- Thant Myint-U (8 January 2008). The River of Lost Footsteps: A Personal History of Burma (1st ed.). New York: Farrar, Straus and Giroux. ISBN 978-0374531164.
- Thant Myint-U; Scott, Amy (14 September 2007). The UN Secretariat: A Brief History. Lynne Rienner Publishers. ISBN 978-0937722992.
- Thant Myint-U (26 March 2001). The Making of Modern Burma (1st ed.). Cambridge University Press. ISBN 978-0521799140.

== Awards ==
For his efforts to preserve Yangon's built heritage, he was named by the Foreign Policy magazine as one of the "100 Leading Global Thinkers" in its annual list in 2013. He was voted 15th in Prospect magazine's annual online poll of the "World's Leading Thinkers" in 2014 in a list which feature many notable Indians including Kaushik Basu. In 2015, he received Fukuoka Prize, awarded by the city of Fukuoka. In 2018, he received Padma Shri, the fourth-ranked civilian award in India.

== Personal life ==
Thant is married to Sofia Busch. He has a son, Thurayn Myint-U, born in 1999 to Hanna Styrmisdóttir, a granddaughter of Iceland's first female mayor, Hulda Jakobsdóttir, and politician Finnbogi Rútur Valdimarsson, brother of Hannibal Valdimarsson.
