= Sarpay Beikman =

- Predecessor: Burmese Translation Society
- Formation: 26 August 1947; 79 years ago
- Type: GO
- Purpose: Education
- Headquarters: Yangon
- Region served: Burma
- Website: sarpaybeikman-pol.gov.mm

Sarpay Beikman (Burmese: စာပေဗိမာန်; lit. 'Palace of Literature') originated as the Burmese Translation Society. Its first President was Prime Minister U Nu, who started a Burmese translation job at Judson College (now University of Yangon). The purpose was to translate world culture, literature, education for the Burmese public. In 1963, the society was absorbed into the Ministry of Information's Printing and Publishing Enterprise as the Sarpay Beikman Literature House, and the mandate was extended to encourage local writers and to print and publish books of all types. The society presents the annual Sarpay Beikman Manuscript Awards and Burma National Literature Awards for excellent new unpublished and published writing in various categories.

== Early years ==
After independence the Burmese Translation Society decided that independent Burma need a Burmese Encyclopedia and began the project to compile one in May 1948. Initially, they wanted to translate Sir John Hamilton's encyclopedia into 10 volumes. Shortly after this (in 1949), they stopped direct translation and completed the project with Burmese related articles including facts on the arts and sciences. Volume No. 1 was printed in 1954; the last volume (No. 15) was completed and printed in 1976. The first five volumes were printed in England, but after that the society started using its own press in Rangoon. After that, yearly volumes of updates were published.

In 1951, a translation with pictures of a history of the years 1900 to 1950 was printed in the Netherlands. Then in 1957, publication was initiated of Lu Htu Thekpan, comprising 30 volumes for science technologies. They helped the Ministry of Education with the publication of textbooks for schools. The Burmese Translation Society not only translated books but also encouraged many other forms of Burmese culture and literature activities. The Society established a free library in Rangoon in 1956. By 2011 the library had 50,000 book titles in the main section and another 12,000 book titles in the reference section. In March 2011 a branch of the Sarpay Beikman Library was established in Mandalay.

== Sarpay Beikman ==
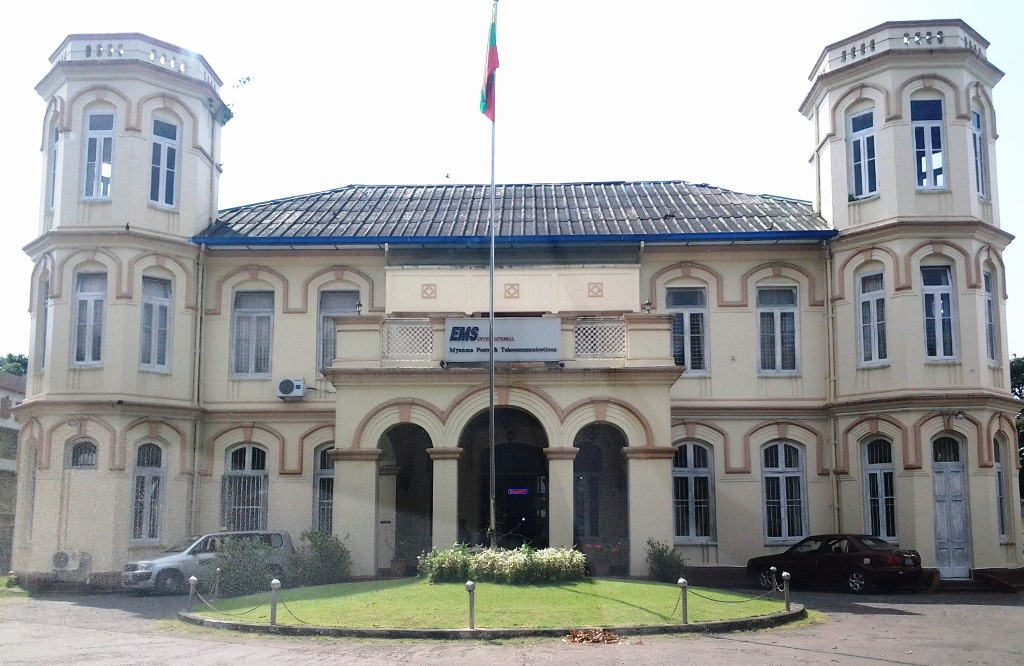
Sarpay Beikman House in Yangon, now owned by Ministry of Communications and Information Technology

The Burma Translation Society was renamed "Sarpay Beikman" (Palace of Literature) in 1963 when it was absorbed into the Ministry of Information. The government chose the organization as the vehicle for funding and executing policy in the areas of educational writing and serious literature. The mandate of the Sarpay Beikman was to "improve and enrich the general knowledge of all the nationals of the Union". The management board was to compile outstanding work of foreign literature and other branches of knowledge for translation into Burmese or other indigenous languages. It was to print and publish these works at the lowest possible price. Textbooks were subject to approval by the government, and had to be in line with socialist policy.

The management board decided that in addition it would award prizes for good fiction and research in Burmese literature and fine arts and would sponsor seminars and training courses on writing, book production, journalism and librarianism. Sarpay Beikman would also produce and distribute all sorts of written material, run a book club, run a bookshop in Rangoon to sell government publications including its own publications, and open a public reading room and lending library. Sarpay Beikman tends to concentrate on educational works rather than fiction, with the exception of children's books for which there is demand that is unfilled by private publishers.

The society also published the English-language magazine Open Mind, renamed to Spectrum after 1962. With declining numbers of English readers in the country, it was decided to launch a Burmese version, but with articles geared to the interests of Burmese readers. Sarpay Beikman also arranged large meetings where a leading scholar or writer would present an extensive survey of the discussion topic, and then other speakers could question the speaker, comment or make their own contribution. There proven highly popular, so much so that secondary speakers sometimes had to be drawn by lot. Following the seminar the society publishes a book with the main contributions.

== Awards ==
The society began to present the Sarpay Beikman Awards (K. 1000) in 1949. They were renamed the Literary Fine Art Awards in 1962 and the National Literary Awards in 1965. The awards were presented to authors who submitted manuscripts in categories such novel, translation, general literature, general knowledge, short story, poems, and dramas. The prizes were awarded annually, and the manuscripts published. Entries had to comply with five general principles: the works must support or at least agree with the ruling party aims, foster Burmese culture, promote patriotism, help build character and advance ideas and contribute useful knowledge. A first, second and third prize was awarded in each category where there were suitable entries, which was not always the case.

From 1970 a new system was started. Unpublished works were submitted in competition for the Sarpay Beikman Manuscript Awards. However, the National Literary Awards, one per category, were selected from books that had been published in the previous year. Although 12 awards could be given, the selection committee usually chose fewer, since it is often not possible to find a publication that meets the guidelines, particularly in the "novel" category. In recent years the genres covered by Sarpay Beikman Manuscript and National Literary Awards have been gradually extended and the number of awards increased. Relatively few translators are honored. In 2008 no translation prize was given at all. This may in part be due to financial constraints, in part to censorship and interference in what is translated by the military regime.

== See also ==
- Burma Education Extension Association
- Burma studies
