= Nyi Kan-Kaung =

Nyi Kan-Kaung ညီကံကောင်း

Governor of Dala
- Reign: 1370/71 – 1388/89
- Predecessor: Smin Zeik-Bye of Dala
- Successor: Baw Kyaw
- Born: c. 1352 c. 714 ME; Pegu (Bago); Martaban Kingdom
- Died: 1388/89; 750 ME; Dala–Twante; Hanthawaddy kingdom
- Issue: Baw Kyaw
- Father: Min Linka
- Mother: Mwei Daw
- Religion: Theravada Buddhism

Nyi Kan-Kaung (Mon: ညီကာံကံင်, Burmese: ညီကံကောင်း or ညီဂံဂေါင်, Burmese pronunciation: [ɲì gàɴ gáʊɴ]; c. 1352–1388/89) was a Hanthawaddy royal and governor of Dala–Twante from 1370/71 to 1388/89. A stepson of King Binnya U, the prince was an early supporter of his half-brother Binnya Nwe's successful rebellion against U in 1383–1384. However he was executed in 1388/89 by Nwe, now known as Razadarit, for suspicion of planning a rebellion.

== Early life ==
Ma Nyi Kan-Kaung was the youngest of three children of Prince Min Linka of Pegu (Bago) and his wife Mwei Daw. He hailed from Martaban and Sukhothai royal lines, and was a half-nephew of then king Binnya U of Martaban. The prince was born c. 1352, (Note: (Pan Hla 2005: 45–47): Kan-Kaung's parents were wedded in 1348/49; he had two elder sisters; and his father was executed c. early 1353.) during his father's insurrection against the king. But the rebellion failed. In 1353, the entire family was brought to the capital Martaban (Mottama) where Binnya U had Linka executed, and raised Mwei Daw as his latest queen. The king did spare the three children due to the intervention of his chief queen Sanda Min Hla, who was also the children's maternal aunt.

Kan-Kaung grew up at the Martaban Palace until 1364. He found a reliable protector in Queen Sanda, who did not have any children and loved him like her own son. Then in early 1364, a palace coup drove the royal family to Donwun, a small town about 100 kilometres (62 mi) north of Martaban where they stayed until 1369. He lost his protector Queen Sanda soon after their move to Donwun. According to the Razadarit Ayedawbon chronicle, her last request to Binnya U on her death bed was for U not to punish Kan-Kaung for his father's sins; she died after the king granted her wish.

== Governor of Dala ==
=== Appointment ===
U kept his promise. In 1370/71, about a year after he had moved his capital to Pegu, the king appointed his nephew and stepson governor of Dala (modern Dala Township and Twante Township in Yangon Region). The appointment came after the previous governor Smin Zeik-Bye had died of natural causes. It was a key appointment to a strategically important region. Dala was about 120 kilometres (75 mi) southwest of Pegu, and bordered the delta province where a serious rebellion by Gov. Laukpya of Myaungmya had been active since 1364. Indeed, when Kan-Kaung was appointed, Laukpya's forces were still raiding Dala and Syriam. But Kan-Kaung did not see much action as the king reached a truce with Laukpya, and Byattaba of Martaban c. 1371.

=== Binnya Nwe's rebellion ===
Kan-Kaung ruled the district without incident until 1383. Then in May 1383, his 15-year-old maternal half-brother Prince Binnya Nwe came to Dagon (modern downtown Yangon) with a plan to raise a rebellion. The young prince had been deeply dissatisfied with his ailing father, as well as with his adoptive mother Princess Maha Dewi, the de facto power. As Dala was across the river from Dagon, Kan-Kaung was the first governor Nwe tried to recruit. Kan-Kaung himself had been concerned about the princess's rumored plan to put her lover Smim Maru on the throne, and told Nwe's emissaries that he would support Nwe.

His support was crucial for the nascent rebellion. He initially provided over 300 troops and war elephants before personally joining Nwe's camp at Dagon with additional men. When Nwe marched to Pegu in December 1383, Kan-Kaung stayed behind at Dala to guard the rear.

=== Final years ===
Kan-Kaung remained a steadfast supporter when Nwe became king on 4 January 1384 with the title of Razadarit. No other major vassal rulers—including viceroys Laukpya, Byattaba and Sam Lek—acknowledged the 16-year-old boy-king. Razadarit considered all of them in revolt although he could not yet take any action. Kan-Kaung survived Razadarit's initial round of purges at Pegu that removed anyone with a claim to the throne. The new king promptly had his brother-in-law Maru executed, and ordered his paternal half-brother Baw Ngan-Mohn imprisoned. In contrast, Kan-Kaung was allowed to keep his post at Dala.

Chronicles are mum about Kan-Kaung's activities in the next four plus years. Although his name is not explicitly listed as a Hanthawaddy commander in the chronicles, he presumably led the defense of his district in 1385–1387 when the northern Ava forces invaded the southern country to oust Razadarit. Dala was part of the defense line that stopped numerically superior Ava forces from advancing to Pegu.

Despite the success, the embattled king was suspicious about his half-brother's historical ties with Laukpya. The viceroy of Myaungmya was the one that invited Ava to oust Razadarit. Then in 1388, after he had conquered the Martaban province (modern day Mon State and southern Kayin State), Razadarit received intelligence that Kan-Kaung had entered into a secret alliance with Laukpya. The king sent a senior official named Smin Eindazeik to confirm the story. When the story was confirmed, Razadarit attacked Dala (probably in late 1388 or early 1389). (Note: The chronicle Razadarit Ayedawbon (Pan Hla 2005: 178) only says Dala was attacked in 750 ME (29 March 1388 to 28 March 1389) in preparation of an attack on Myaungmya. The attack was most probably in the dry season (November 1388 to May 1389), and since Dala was taken with at most minimal fight, Dala likely fell in the early dry season (November/December 1388).) Kan-Kaung was arrested and executed and Razadarit appointed Kan-Kaung's son Baw Kyaw to succeed him as governor of Dala. Baw Kyaw was a loyal vassal to his uncle Razadarit; he also became a commander in the army and died in action in 1402.

== Ancestry ==
The prince was a grandson of King Saw Zein of Martaban, and a great grandson of King Loe Thai of Sukhothai. His maternal side hailed from a line of court ministers, ultimately from Senior Minister Bo Htu-Hpyet, who served at the court of King Wareru.

Ancestry of Prince Nyi Kan-Kaung

8. Min Bala of Myaungmya
4. Saw Zein
9. Hnin U Yaing
2. Min Linka
10. Loe Thai
5. May Hnin Htapi
11. unnamed
1. Nyi Kan-Kaung
12. Bo Htu-Hpyet
6. Than-Bon
13. unnamed
3. Mwei Daw
14. unnamed
7. unnamed
15. unnamed

== Bibliography ==
- Harvey, G. E. (1925). History of Burma: From the Earliest Times to 10 March 1824. London: Frank Cass & Co. Ltd.
- Maha Sithu (2012) [1798]. Kyaw Win; Thein Hlaing (eds.). Yazawin Thit (in Burmese). Vol. 1–3 (2nd printing ed.). Yangon: Ya-Pyei Publishing.
- Pan Hla, Nai (2005) [1968]. Razadarit Ayedawbon (in Burmese) (8th printing ed.). Yangon: Armanthit Sarpay.

Nyi Kan-Kaung Hanthawaddy Dynasty Born: c. 1352 Died: 1388/89
Royal titles
Preceded by Smin Zeik-Bye	Governor of Dala; 1370/71–1388/89	Succeeded by Baw Kyaw
