= Min Linka =

Min Linka မင်း လင်္ကာ

Governor of Pegu
- Reign: 1348 – c. 1353
- Born: c. 1327; Martaban (Mottama); Martaban Kingdom
- Died: c. 1353; 714 ME; Martaban; Martaban Kingdom
- Spouse: Mwei Daw
- Issue Detail: Thazin Saw Dala; Thazin Saw U Nyi Kan-Kaung
- Father: Saw Zein
- Mother: May Hnin Htapi
- Religion: Theravada Buddhism

Min Linka (Burmese: မင်း လင်္ကာ, pronounced [mɪ́ɴ lìɴgà]) was governor of Pegu (Bago) from 1348 to c. 1353. Son of King Saw Zein of Martaban, the prince was appointed governor by his half-brother King Binnya U. But he did not help his brother during the 1351–52 invasion of the kingdom by Lan Na. He was defeated by his brother's forces after they had defeated the invasion. Linka was brought back to Martaban, and executed there.

== Brief ==
Born c. 1327 in Martaban (Mottama), (Note: He was born sometime between 1325 and 1330. Per the Razadarit Ayedawbon (Pan Hla 2005: 39, 41), Saw Zein married his sister-in-law May Hnin Htapi after his accession in September 1323. The couple had two children: Mi Ma-Hsan and Min Linka before Saw Zein was assassinated c. April 1330.) Min Linka was the second child of Queen May Hnin Htapi and King Saw Zein of Martaban. The prince had one full elder sister, Tala Mi Ma-Hsan; two maternal half-siblings, King Saw E (r. 1330) and May Hnin Aw-Kanya; and three paternal half-siblings, Mwei Ne, Princess-Regent Maha Dewi (r. 1383–1384) and King Binnya U (r. 1348–1384).

In 1348, the prince was appointed governor of Pegu (Bago) with the title of Smin Nyi Kaung Thein (သမိန် ညီကောင်သိန်, [θəmèiɴ ɲì gàʊ̯ɴ θèɪɴ]) by Binnya U, who had just ascended the throne. It was an important appointment as the new king, who was still consolidating power, needed someone he could trust in Pegu, located in the geographic center of the Mon-speaking kingdom. The new king also married Linka to Mwei Daw, daughter of Chief Minister Than Bon.

Linka, however, was not loyal to his brother. He did not send any help to U in 1351 when the king faced a major rebellion at Donwun, just 100 km north of Martaban, and half-way between Pegu and Martaban. The rebellion was backed by the eastern Tai-speaking kingdom of Lan Na, (Note: Per (Fernquest 2006: 4), the invasion is not listed in the Chaing Mai Chronicle, and the invaders may have come from another Tai-Shan state. However, the Razadarit Ayedawbon chronicle (Pan Hla 2005: 55–56, 62–63) consistently portrays Chiang Mai as a threat or the backer of rebellions well into the 1370s.) which sent an 8000-strong invasion force. The dry season invasion penetrated deep into Martaban territory but the invaders overstretched, and were decisively defeated by U near Martaban. After the victory, U was able to consolidate support amongst his vassals, who wanted to be on the winning side. Linka was now in trouble. He had not consolidated support in the Pegu province itself. In the following dry season of 1352–1353, (Note: Inferred from the reporting in the chronicle Razadarit Ayedawbon (Pan Hla 2005: 45–47). The chronicle only says that U sent a force to reclaim Pegu soon after the Lan Na invasion, which began in 713 ME (1351/52). However, by the time Linka was captured, he already had three children by Mwei Daw, whom he married in late 1348. Therefore, it is probable that he was captured in the following dry season of 1352/53. Furthermore, (Htin Aung 1967: 38) says Binnya U had overcome rival claimants only by 1353; (Harvey 1925: 368) says Binnya U became king in 1353.) U sent an army to reclaim Pegu. The operation was successful.

Linka, along with his wife and three children, was brought back to Martaban. At the capital, U took his wife, who became Queen Thiri Maya Dewi, and ordered his execution. Thiri Maya Dewi and U later had a son, the future king Razadarit. U treated Linka's children well. He appointed Linka's only son, Nyi Kan-Kaung, governor of Dala–Twante c. 1370. (Note: (Pan Hla 2005: 178): Nyi Kan-Kaung was executed by Razadarit in 750 ME (1388/89).)

== Ancestry ==
Linka was a grandnephew of the founder of the dynasty King Wareru from his father's side, and a grandson of King Loe Thai of Sukhothai from his mother's side. (Note: See (Pan Hla 2005: 40) for Linka's parents, King Saw Zeik and Queen May Hnin Htapi. See (Pan Hla 2005: 38, 39) for Htapi's father, King of Sukhothai, who in 1323 was Loe Thai. See (Pan Hla 2005: 37) for Saw Zeik's parents, Min Bala and Hnin U Yaing. See (Pan Hla 2005: 16) for Hnin U Yaing being Wareru's younger sister.)

Ancestry of Min Linka

8. unnamed
4. Min Bala of Myaungmya
9. unnamed
2. Saw Zein
10. unnamed
5. Hnin U Yaing
11. unnamed
1. Linka
12. Ram Khamhaeng
6. Loe Thai
13. unnamed
3. May Hnin Htapi
14. unnamed
7. unnamed
15. unnamed

== Bibliography ==
- Fernquest, Jon (Spring 2006). "Rajadhirat's Mask of Command: Military Leadership in Burma (c. 1348–1421)" (PDF). SBBR. 4 (1).
- Harvey, G. E. (1925). History of Burma: From the Earliest Times to 10 March 1824. London: Frank Cass & Co. Ltd.
- Htin Aung, Maung (1967). A History of Burma. New York and London: Cambridge University Press.
- Pan Hla, Nai (2005) [1968]. Razadarit Ayedawbon (in Burmese) (8th printing ed.). Yangon: Armanthit Sarpay.
- Phayre, Lt. Gen. Sir Arthur P. (1967) [1883]. History of Burma. London: Susil Gupta.

Min Linka Hanthawaddy Dynasty Born: c. 1327 Died: c. 1353
Royal titles
| Preceded by | Governor of Pegu; 1348 – c. 1353 | Succeeded by |
