= Mwei Kaw =

Hnin An Daung Mwei Kaw နှင်းအံဒေါင်း မွေ့ကော

Chief Queen of Martaban–Hanthawaddy
- Tenure: 1348 – 1384
- Predecessor: Sanda Min Hla II
- Successor: Piya Yaza Dewi
- Born: c. 1330s Martaban (Mottama)? Martaban Kingdom
- Died: Unknown; Pegu (Bago); Hanthawaddy kingdom
- Spouse: Binnya U (1348–1384)
- Issue: Tala Mi Thiri
- House: Hanthawaddy Pegu
- Father: Than-Bon
- Religion: Theravada Buddhism

Hnin An Daung Mwei Kaw (Burmese: နှင်းအံဒေါင်း မွေ့ကော, pronounced [n̥ɪ́ɴ ʔàɴ dáʊ̯ɴ mwḛ kɔ́]; also spelled as Hnin An Daw) was a principal queen consort of King Binnya U of Martaban–Hanthawaddy. She may have been Binnya U's second chief queen consort.

== Brief ==
Born Mwei Kaw, she was the second daughter of Minister Than-Bon of the Martaban court. She and her two sisters Mwei It and Mwei Zeik became queens of Binnya U soon after his accession. Their youngest sister Mwei Daw became a wife of Binnya U about five years later.

Her royal title was Hnin An Daung (sometimes reported as Hnin An Daw (နှင်းအံဒေါ)). She had a daughter named Tala Mi Thiri (also spelled Tala May Thiri), who became a queen of King Kue Na of Lan Na (in the 1560s and the early 1570s).

She may have succeeded Mwei It as chief queen after her elder sister's death in the mid-1560s. (Note: The Razadarit Ayedawbon chronicle does not explicitly state the chief queen's consort of Binnya U. However, based on the chronicle's ordering of queens and their issue (Pan Hla 2005: 47), and Mwei It's title Sanda Min Hla which was last worn by Queen Sanda Min Hla, the chief queen of three Martaban kings, Mwei It was likely the first chief queen. Hnin An Daung Mwei Kaw was listed second behind Mwei It. The chronicle does state that Binnya U's favorite queen was a commoner Mwei Ma-Gu-Thauk, who was the mother of Baw Ngan-Mohn, the heir apparent.)

== Bibliography ==
- Pan Hla, Nai (2005) [1968]. Razadarit Ayedawbon (in Burmese) (8th printing ed.). Yangon: Armanthit Sarpay.

Mwei Kaw Hanthawaddy Dynasty
Royal titles
| Preceded by Sanda Min Hla II | Chief Queen of Martaban–Hanthawaddy c. 1365–1384 | Succeeded by Piya Yaza Dewi |
