= Mwei It =

Sanda Min Hla II စန္ဒာမင်းလှ မွေ့အစ်

Chief Queen of Martaban
- Tenure: 1348 – c. 1365
- Predecessor: Sanda Min Hla
- Successor: Hnin An Daung?
- Born: c. 1330s Martaban (Mottama)? Martaban Kingdom
- Died: c. 1365; Donwun; Martaban Kingdom
- Spouse: Binnya U (1348–c. 1365)
- Issue: none
- House: Wareru
- Father: Than-Bon
- Religion: Theravada Buddhism

Sanda Min Hla Mwei It (Burmese: စန္ဒာမင်းလှ မွေ့အစ်, pronounced [sàɴdà mɪ́ɴ l̥a̰ mwḛ ʔɪʔ]; c. 1340s–c. 1365) was a principal queen consort of King Binnya U of Martaban–Hanthawaddy. She may have been Binnya U's first chief queen consort.

== Brief ==
Born Mwei It, the future queen was the eldest daughter of Minister Than-Bon of the Martaban court. She and her two younger sisters Mwei Kaw and Mwei Zeik became queens of Binnya U soon after his accession. Their youngest sister Mwei Daw later became a wife of Binnya U about five years later. She may have been the king's first chief queen consort. (Note: The Razadarit Ayedawbon chronicle does not explicitly state the chief queen consort of Binnya U. However, based on the chronicle's ordering of queens and their issue (Pan Hla 2005: 47), and her title Sanda Min Hla which was last worn by Queen Sanda Min Hla, the chief queen of three Martaban kings, she was likely the first chief queen.)

The queen did not have any issues. She raised her nephew Ma Nyi Kan-Kaung (son of Mwei Daw and Min Linka) as her own son. She died in Donwun in the mid 1360s, a few years after Binnya U had been driven out of Martaban by the rebel forces led by Byattaba. Her request to Binnya U on her deathbed was not to harm Nyi Kan-Kaung; she died soon after the king agreed to her wish. The king kept his promise. In the early 1370s, the king appointed Nyi Kan-Kaung, who was also his nephew, governor of Dala–Twante.

== Bibliography ==
- Pan Hla, Nai (2005) [1968]. Razadarit Ayedawbon (in Burmese) (8th printing ed.). Yangon: Armanthit Sarpay.

Mwei It Hanthawaddy Dynasty Born: c. 1330s Died: c. 1365
Royal titles
Preceded by Sanda Min Hla	Chief Queen of Martaban; 1348 – c. 1365	Succeeded by Hnin An Daung?
