= Tala Mi Thiri =

Queen of Lan Na (c. 1350)

Tala Mi Thiri တလမည်သီရိ

Queen of Lan Na
- Tenure: c. 1365 – c. 1371
- Born: c. 1350; Martaban (Mottama)? Martaban Kingdom
- Died: Unknown; Pegu (Bago); Hanthawaddy kingdom
- Spouse: Kue Na (c. 1365 – c. 1371); Smin Maru (c. 1372 – 1384)
- House: Hanthawaddy Pegu
- Father: Binnya U
- Mother: Hnin An Daung
- Religion: Theravada Buddhism

Tala Mi Thiri (Burmese: တလမည်သီရိ, pronounced [təla̰ mì θìɹḭ]; also တလမေသီရိ) was a princess of Martaban–Hanthawaddy Kingdom. She was the eldest daughter of King Binnya U and elder half-sister of King Razadarit.

Her first marriage to King Kue Na of Lan Na from c. 1365 to c. 1371 ended in a divorce. Her second marriage to Smin Maru, a wealthy son of a court official, was marred by an alleged long-running affair between Maru and her aunt Princess Maha Dewi.

== Early life ==
The princess was the only child of Queen Hnin An Daung and King Binnya U. Born in Martaban (Mottama), then capital of the Mon-speaking kingdom, she was the king's eldest child. She had three other much younger half-siblings: Binnya Nwe, Tala Mi Daw and Baw Ngan-Mohn.

== Queen of Lan Na ==
Thiri's cloistered upbringing changed forever in 1363/64. That year, a coup pushed her father out of Martaban. The royal family moved to the dynasty's ancestral home Donwun, about 100 km north of Martaban. Her stay at Donwun was short. Her father sent her to Chiang Mai to wed King Kue Na of Lan Na. It was a marriage of state designed to achieve an alliance between the kingdoms but she had a terrible time. Soon after, she began reporting back to her family that she did not enjoy her life in Chiang Mai, and begged her family to get her back.

Her calls initially went unheeded. Binnya U was fighting for his survival. He was driven out of Donwun in 1369/70. By 1371, he was forced to accept to a truce with the rebel forces in which he agreed to pay the rebels in exchange for the rebels' nominal allegiance to him. Soon after she returned to her homeland but to Binnya U's new capital Pegu (Bago).

== Pegu years ==
At Pegu, the princess, still only in her early twenties, soon found a suitor in Smin Maru. Though not of royal lineage, Maru was a wealthy son of a court minister, and offered 5 viss (8.16 kg) of gold in dowry. The king had fond memories of Maru's father, who had died in action in his service, and gave his permission. A 7-day lavish wedding between Maru and the princess followed.

Her second marriage did not turn out right either. According to the Razadarit Ayedawbon, Maru was just trying to get close to power. By the mid 1370s, the power increasingly belonged to the king's elder sister Maha Dewi. The king's health had been deteriorating, and he had begun giving day-to-day duties to his sister, one person he trusted. The chronicle reports that Maru began an affair with the much older Maha Dewi about three years into the marriage. Powerful court factions opposed to Maha Dewi made sure that the affair became public.

At any rate, Thiri remained married to Maru till the end. In 1383, her 15-year-old half-brother Binnya Nwe raised a small rebellion out of Dagon with help from opposing factions of the court. Maru tried to put down the rebellion but was driven back in November 1383. After Binnya U's death on 2 January 1384, Maru tried to rally the court to back him. When it became clear that the court would back Nwe instead, Maru and Thiri tried to flee to Martaban.

But they did not get far and were arrested. On 5 January 1384, on the day of the coronation, the couple were tied to a pole at the royal elephant stables for all to see. The Razadarit Ayedawbon states that Maha Dewi collapsed when she saw Maru and Thiri tied to the pole. Nwe before starting the coronation ordered Maru executed. Thiri apparently escaped the execution. The chronicle does not say that the new king, about to take the title Razadarit, ordered the execution of his half-sister Thiri.

== Bibliography ==
- Pan Hla, Nai (2005) [1968]. Razadarit Ayedawbon (in Burmese) (8th printing ed.). Yangon: Armanthit Sarpay.

Tala Mi Thiri Hanthawaddy Dynasty
Royal titles
Preceded by	Queen of Lan Na c. 1365–c. 1371	Succeeded by
