= Mwei Zeik =

Sanda Dewi Mwei Zeik စန္ဒာဒေဝီ မွေ့ဇိပ်

Queen of Martaban–Hanthawaddy
- Tenure: 1348 – 1384
- Born: c. 1330s Martaban (Mottama)? Martaban Kingdom
- Died: Unknown; Pegu (Bago); Hanthawaddy kingdom
- Spouse: Binnya U (1348–1384)
- Issue: Tala Mi Daw
- House: Hanthawaddy Pegu
- Father: Than-Bon
- Religion: Theravada Buddhism

Sanda Dewi Mwei Zeik (Burmese: စန္ဒာဒေဝီ မွေ့ဇိပ် [sàɴdà dèwì mwḛ zeiʔ];) was a principal queen consort of King Binnya U of Martaban–Hanthawaddy.

Born Mwei Zeik, she was the third daughter of Minister Than-Bon of the Martaban court. She and her elder two sisters Mwei It and Mwei Kaw became queens of Binnya U soon after his accession. Their youngest sister Mwei Daw later became a wife of Binnya U about five years later.

Her royal title was Sanda Dewi. She had a daughter named Tala Mi Daw (also spelled Tala May Daw), the first wife of King Razadarit.

== Bibliography ==
- Pan Hla, Nai (1968). Razadarit Ayedawbon (in Burmese) (8th printing, 2005 ed.). Yangon: Armanthit Sarpay.

Mwei Zeik Hanthawaddy Dynasty
Royal titles
Preceded by	Queen of Martaban–Hanthawaddy; 1348–1384	Succeeded by
