= Maha Dewi of Hanthawaddy =

Maha Dewi မဟာဒေဝီ

Regent of Hanthawaddy
- Reign: by 28 October 1383 – 4 January 1384
- Predecessor: Binnya U (as monarch)
- Successor: Razadarit (as monarch)
- Monarch: Binnya U

Governor of Dagon
- Reign: 1364 – c. 1392
- Predecessor: Bya Hta-Baik
- Successor: ?
- Born: in or before 1322; Martaban (Mottama), Martaban Kingdom
- Died: c. 1392 c. 754 ME; Dagon, Hanthawaddy kingdom
- Spouse: Bya Hta-Baik (m. 1348; died 1363) Zeya Thura (m. 1363; died 1364)
- Issue: none biological Razadarit (adopted)
- House: Wareru
- Father: Saw Zein
- Mother: Sanda Min Hla
- Religion: Theravada Buddhism

Maha Dewi (Burmese: မဟာဒေဝီ, pronounced [məhà dèwì]; c. 1322 – c. 1392) was princess-regent of Hanthawaddy for about ten weeks at the end of her brother King Binnya U's reign. She was also governor of Dagon from 1364 to c. 1392.

Prior to her brief reign as regent, she had been a close adviser of her brother since 1369, and the de facto ruler of the kingdom since the early 1380s. However, Maha Dewi did not gain the support of the court. Powerful factions of the court used her alleged long-term affair with her much younger nephew-in-law Smin Maru to undermine her influence. When her nephew and adopted son Binnya Nwe raised a rebellion in 1383, Chief Minister Zeik-Bye secretly sided with Nwe.

Her ailing brother formally handed her power in October 1383; however, she could not defeat Nwe's rebellion. After Binnya U's death two months later, the court chose Nwe, who ascended the throne with the title of Razadarit. The new king reappointed his adoptive mother to her old post at Dagon but purely in a ceremonial role.

== Early life ==
She was born Mwei Na (Mon: မောံန, Burmese: မွေ့န) to Princess Sanda Min Hla, and Prince Saw Zein. Her parents were first cousins. At birth, she received the title Wihara Dewi because she was born during the construction of a monastery donated by her father. Na had two full siblings: an elder sister Mwei Ne, and a younger brother Binnya U. Since her younger brother was born in 1323/24, Na was born in or before 1322. Shortly after her birth, her father became king of Martaban. Na became the king's eldest surviving child as Ne died young. The king gave Na the title "Maha Dewi", the name by which she would be known.

The two siblings became fatherless in 1330 when Saw Zein died. The young royals remained important as their powerful mother placed two successive kings and made herself their chief queen until 1348.

== Princess of Dagon ==
The princess remained unmarried well into her mid-twenties. In 1348, Binnya U ascended the Martaban throne, and made his sister marry Bon La, son of the powerful minister Than-Daw in a marriage alliance. The new king also made Bon La governor of Dagon (modern central Yangon) with the title of Bya Hta-Baik. In the following years, her husband became an important ally of her brother. In 1362, Binnya U raised the Shwedagon Pagoda in Dagon to 20 meters (66 feet).

In 1363, while the king and his retinue were away from the capital Martaban (Mottama), a rival faction led by Prince Byattaba seized the throne. Byattaba's brother Laukpya also raised a rebellion in the Irrawaddy delta. The king sent Bya Hta-Baik with an army to retake the capital, but the commander was killed by poison by Byattaba's wife and Maha Dewi's younger half-sister Tala Mi Ma-Hsan during truce negotiations.

Maha Dewi was quickly married her off to Zeya Thura, governor of Hmawbi, whom he had appointed as the next commander-in-chief. Zeya Thura died in action soon after in the subsequent attack on Martaban. After Zeya Thura's death, Binnya U appointed her governor of Dagon.

== Governor of Dagon ==
Maha Dewi proved an able governor. She became a much needed ally to her brother, who was now based out of Donwun, about 100 km north of Martaban. Her effective control of Dagon provided a backstop to Laukpya's forces from coming into the central Pegu province (modern Yangon Region and southern Bago Region). Smin Than-Byat, a brother of Byattaba and Laukpya but loyal to Binnya U, successfully defended the Pegu province from Laukpya's attacks from the west. In 1369/1370, Byattaba's forces drove out Binnya U from Donwun. Binnya U's territory was now reduced to the Pegu province. He moved the capital to Pegu (Bago), about 60 km northeast of Dagon.

== Power broker at Pegu ==
Her power grew even as her brother's domain shrank. The king, after the death of his trusted chief minister Pun-So in 1369, came to rely on his sister for advice. When Gov. Than-Byat of Syriam switched sides, it was Maha Dewi that planned the counterattack. She appointed Gen. Yawgarat and Smin Maru to retake Syriam, across the river from her fiefdom of Dagon. The operation was successful, and Binnya U held on to the Pegu province. (Note: (Pan Hla 2005: 62–63): Binnya U was still in a precarious position. He decided to accept a truce with Byattaba and Laukpya. According to the Pak Lat Chronicles, he had to pay them 16.33 kg of gold and ten elephants in exchange for the brothers' nominal submission.)

Her rise however was not universally accepted. A court faction led by Chief Minister Zeik-Bye surreptitiously opposed her. The opposition became stronger about three years later when the princess, now in her 50s, allegedly became involved with a much younger Maru, who was the husband of Binnya U's daughter (and her niece) Tala Mi Thiri. The affair became public, and the people of Pegu began ridiculing her. The chronicle Razadarit Ayedawbon reports two supposedly contemporary verses which in vivid language strongly disparage the princess for having a scandalous "home-wrecking" affair at an old age with a younger married man. The affair reportedly is the source of the Mon proverb: "The old peahen climbs up a tree to lay a clutch of eggs; the old woman brazenly steals another woman's husband."

At any rate, she retained her brother's trust. He handed her more power over the years as his health continued to deteriorate. Jockeying for power became more fierce. More factions now allied themselves with the princess and Maru. The Maha Dewi–Maru faction was firmly in power by the early 1380s when the king's health rapidly declined. By 1382, she was the de facto ruler. The main opposition to her rule would come from her nephew and adopted son Binnya Nwe in 1383.

== Rebellion by Binnya Nwe ==
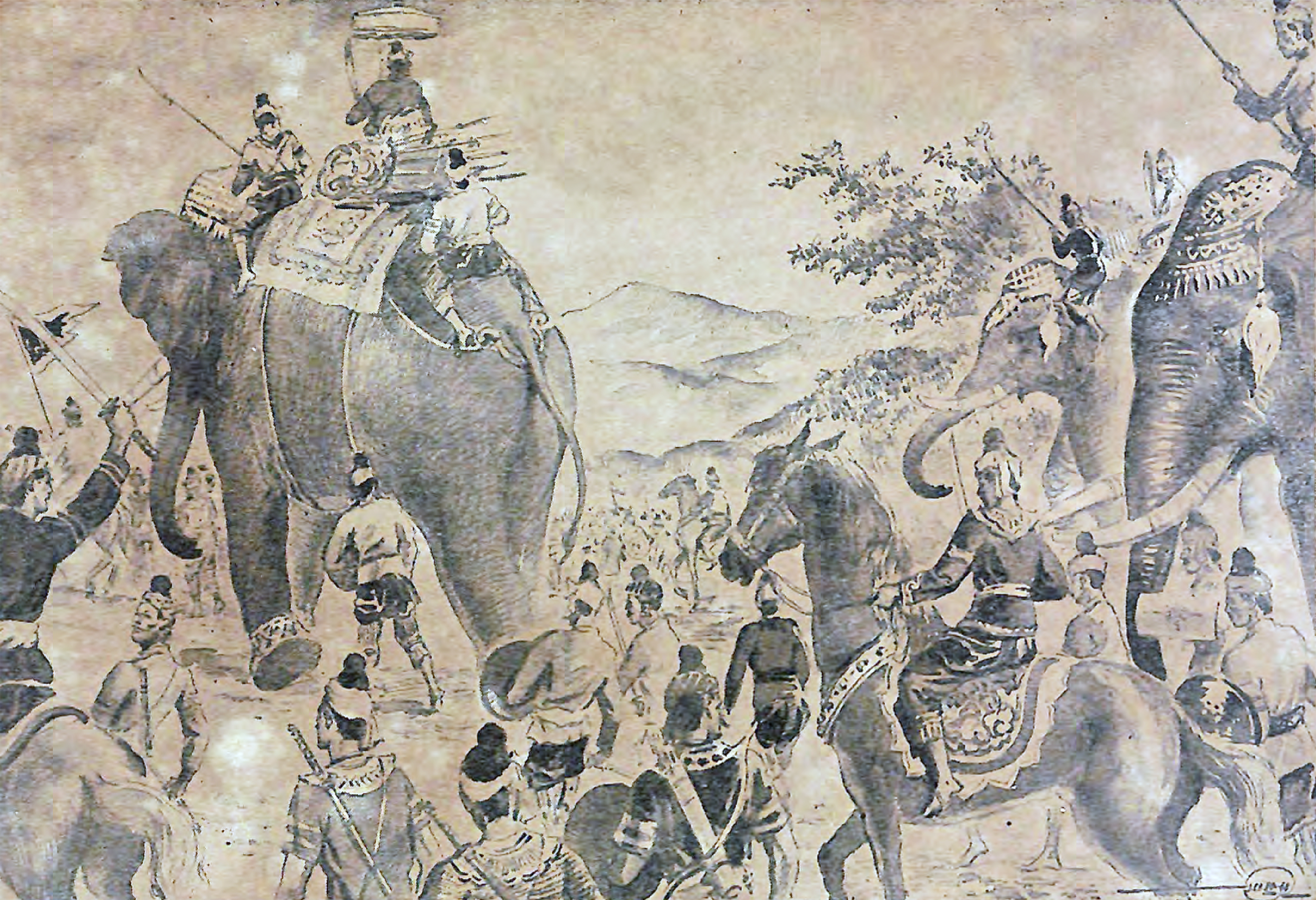
Princees Maha Dewi sent an expedition army led by Smin Maru and Zeik-Bye to suppress the rebellion of Binnya Nwe. An illustration from Rachathirat, a Thai version of Razadarit Ayedawbon, 1946 printed edition.

The princess had adopted Binnya U's son Binnya Nwe since his birth. (The mother Queen Mwei Daw died soon after giving birth to him.) Maha Dewi had raised him like her own son who was never his father's favorite. Indeed, the king deemed him "ruthless", and once told his sister that Nwe was not to ascend the throne. (The king had chosen the younger son Baw Ngan-Mohn as heir-apparent.) Nwe responded in kind. In 1382, he eloped with his half-sister Tala Mi Daw much to the chagrin of their ailing father. The young couple was soon caught and Nwe was imprisoned. Maha Dewi had to repeatedly plead with her brother to free Nwe, and allow the young couple to be married. Her brother finally relented; she wedded the young couple.

It was all for naught. By then, Nwe as well as Ngan-Mohn had come to consider Maha Dewi as the enemy, believing that she would put her lover on the throne instead. Zeik-Bye had been instigating; he had warned Nwe that Maha Dewi and Maru were plotting to arrest him. By 22 April 1383, Nwe had decided to revolt. (Note: (Pan Hla 2005: 92): Binnya Nwe decided to revolt before 6th waning of Kason 745 ME (Wed, 22 April 1383).) In the wee hours of 5 May 1383, Nwe and his 30 men fled to Dagon, and seized the governor's residence at Dagon. (Note: (Pan Hla 2005: 94): Night of Tuesday, 3rd waxing of Nayon 745 ME = Monday, 4 May 1383. The day had turned to Tuesday, 5 May 1383.)

At first, she did not make much of the "rebellion". The ailing king was more annoyed, and asked his sister to handle the situation. She thought about sending a battalion. But Zeik-Bye advised against it, characterizing the insurrection as a harmless exercise by a restless teenager. She agreed and instead sent a delegation to Dagon, asking Nwe to come back. Nwe sent back a conciliatory letter, saying that he still regarded her as his mother, and that he would soon return by August.

But he never planned to. He went on recruiting local governors around Dagon to come over to his side. On 18 August 1383, she sent another delegation. (Note: (Pan Hla 2005: 112): 6th waning of Tawthalin 745 ME = 18 Aug 1383) Nwe again told the envoys that he would soon return. Shortly after, she received news that Nwe had sent missions to enlist help from Martaban and Myaungmya. She rushed her own delegations to the nominal vassals. On 27 August 1383, (Note: End of Tawthalin 745 ME = 27 August 1383) she decided to use force at the end of the rainy season.

== Regency ==
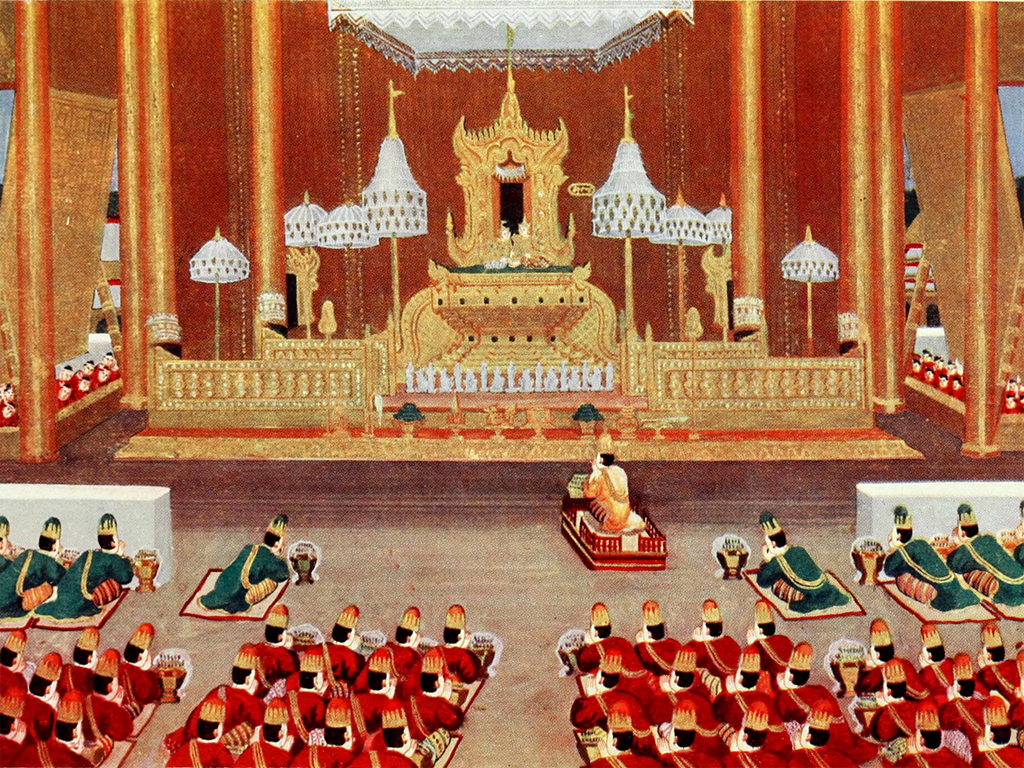
A 19th century Burmese painting depicting white umbrellas used as regalia

Meanwhile, Binnya U's health deteriorated markedly. He could not even attend meetings with the court anymore. In October, he officially handed power to his sister, giving her the right to raise the white umbrella, a symbol of Burmese sovereigns. (Note: Per (Pan Hla 2005: 129), Binnya U transferred power on or a few days before the army left for Dagon on 3rd waxing of Nadaw 745 ME (Wed, 28 Oct 1383).) The act formalized what had been the reality for sometime. She was now referred to as Min Maha Dewi ("Queen Maha Dewi"). However, she continued to refer to her brother as the sovereign in her official edicts.

Her first order was to retake Dagon. She had appointed Maru to lead the vanguard force, and Zeik-Bye the rearguard. On 28 October 1383, three armies—from Pegu, Martaban and Myaungmya—left for Dagon. (Note: (Pan Hla 2005: 129): According to the Razadarit Ayedawbon, three armies from Pegu, Martaban and Myaungmya marched to Dagon. The Pak Lat Chronicles say that an army from Toungoo went too. However, Toungoo was a vassal state of Ava in 1383 as an Ava loyalist Phaungga of Toungoo had taken over Toungoo per (Sein Lwin Lay 2006: 24–25).) Martaban and Myaungmya, which were nominal vassals, sent their armies mainly to monitor the situation. Nwe had already made several defensive preparations based on Zeik-Bye's reports. The three armies set up camp outside Dagon but could not agree on a coordinated plan. Meanwhile, Nwe sent envoys to Myaungmya and Martaban camps that the fight was strictly between him and Maha Dewi. The missions worked. The Myaungmya army first turned back, followed by the Martaban force a few days later. On 19 November 1383, (Note: (Pan Hla 2005: 154): 10th waning of Nadaw 745 ME = 19 Nov 1383) Nwe moved in on Maru's vanguard army. With Zeik-Bye's rearguard staying clear of the fight, Maru was driven back.

Suddenly, it was her regime that was in trouble. She could not comprehend how Nwe's small band of men could have defeated the Pegu army. But she also realized from the open bickering between Zeik-Bye and Maru that she was in no position to organize another attack. She ordered an immediate upgrade of Pegu's moats and fortified walls. Zeik-Bye meanwhile kept Nwe apprised of the developments. By then, her authority was too weak. When Nwe and his small army appeared outside Pegu's walls on 10 December 1383, (Note: (Pan Hla 2005: 156): Thursday, 12th waning of Pyatho 745 ME = Sunday, 20 December 1383. It was more likely Thursday, 2nd waning of Pyatho 745 ME (Thursday, 10 December 1383).) she could do nothing other than hunker down inside the city walls.

The stalemate ended with Binnya U's death on 2 January 1384. Maru tried to rally the court but found no support. When he and his wife tried to flee, they were captured. On 4 January 1384, (Note: (Pan Hla 2005: 356, footnote 1): Monday, 12th waxing of Tabodwe 745 ME = 4 January 1384) the Zeik-Bye-led court handed the power to Nwe. The next day, Nwe ascended the throne with the title of Razadarit. The new king decided not to punish his adoptive mother. He reappointed her to her post at Dagon but strictly in a ceremonial role.

== Last years ==
Maha Dewi lived out her last years at Dagon. She was not part of Razadarit's regime. In the next seven years, she saw her adopted son not only reunite the three Mon-speaking regions by force but also successfully withstand three invasions by the northern Ava Kingdom.

She died c. 1392. (Note: The Razadarit Ayedawbon chronicle (Pan Hla 2005: 203) says that Maha Dewi died in the same year in which Queen Piya Yaza Dewi died and King Binnya Ran I was born. The Razadarit (Pan Hla 2005: 203) states that Queen Piya Yaza Dewi died after Ava troops retreated from the Tharrawaddy frontier, and that Razadarit raised Mwei Ohn-Naung as the chief queen in the month of Kason of that year, without explicitly identifying the year. The prior year mentioned in the chronicle was on (Pan Hla 2005: 197), which says that Ava troops came down to retake Gu-Htut in 754 ME (29 March 1392 to 28 March 1393), and after a dry season campaign, the troops retreated from Tharrawaddy. The narrative (Pan Hla 2005: 197–203) suggests by the time the queen died, the year had already turned (since he raised the next queen in the month of Kason.) But the dateline of the narrative is inconsistent with that of the standard chronicles. According to (Maha Yazawin Vol. 1 2006: 301–303) and (Hmannan Vol. 1 2003: 429–432), Ava troops marched south to retake Gu Htut in 752 ME (1390/91), and went to Tharrawaddy in the dry season of 753 ME (1391/92), and left the frontier in or before 754 ME. According to the standard chronicles, in the dry season of 754 ME (1392–93), Ava was at war with Mohnyin in the north, and not in the south. It means, if Queen Piya did die after the Ava troops had just left as Razadarit suggests, Piya Yaza Dewi and Maha Dewi likely died a year earlier, in or before Kason 754 ME (23 March 1392 to 21 April 1392).) In 1394, Razadarit gave his newborn daughter Shin Sawbu the title of Wihara Dewi, the same title his adoptive mother was given at birth over seven decades earlier.

== Bibliography ==
- Fernquest, Jon (Spring 2006). "Rajadhirat's Mask of Command: Military Leadership in Burma (c. 1348–1421)" (PDF). SBBR. 4 (1). Archived from the original (PDF) on 2019-08-01.
- Harvey, G.E. (1925). History of Burma: From the Earliest Times to 10 March 1824. London: Frank Cass & Co. Ltd.
- Htin Aung, Maung (1967). A History of Burma. New York and London: Cambridge University Press.
- Pan Hla, Nai (2005) [1968]. Razadarit Ayedawbon (in Burmese) (8th printing ed.). Yangon: Armanthit Sarpay.
- Royal Historical Commission of Burma (2003) [1832]. Hmannan Yazawin (in Burmese). Vol. 1–3. Yangon: Ministry of Information, Myanmar.
- Sein Lwin Lay, Kahtika U (2006) [1968]. Min Taya Shwe Hti and Bayinnaung: Ketumadi Taungoo Yazawin (in Burmese) (2nd printing ed.). Yangon: Yan Aung Sarpay.

Maha Dewi of Hanthawaddy Wareru Born: c. 1322 Died: c. 1392
Regnal titles
Preceded by Binnya U as king	Regent of Hanthawaddy by 28 October 1383 – 4 January 1384	Succeeded by Razadarit as king
Royal titles
Preceded by Bya Hta-Baik	Governor of Dagon; 1364 – c. 1392	Succeeded by
