= Mwei Daw =

Thiri Maya Dewi Mwei Daw သီရိမာယာဒေဝီ မွေ့ဒေါ

Queen of Martaban
- Tenure: c. 1353 – c. 28 January 1368
- Born: c. 1340s Martaban (Mottama)? Martaban Kingdom
- Died: c. 28 January 1368; Friday, 8th waxing of Tabodwe 729 ME; Donwun; Martaban Kingdom
- Spouse: Min Linka (1348–c. 1353); Binnya U (c. 1353–1368)
- Issue: Thazin Saw Dala; Thazin Saw U Nyi Kan-Kaung; Razadarit
- House: Wareru
- Father: Than-Bon
- Religion: Theravada Buddhism

Thiri Maya Dewi Mwei Daw (Burmese: သီရိမာယာဒေဝီ မွေ့ဒေါ, pronounced [θìɹḭ màjà dèwì mwḛ dɔ́]; c. 1330s – 28 January 1368) was a principal queen of King Binnya U of Martaban–Hanthawaddy, and the mother of King Razadarit.

== Brief ==
Mwei Daw was the youngest daughter of Than-Bon, a senior minister at the court of King Binnya U. Than-Bon was a son of Senior Minister Bo Htu-Hpyet who served at the court of King Wareru. In 1348/49, soon after the accession of Binnya U, she was married to Gov. Min Linka of Pegu, younger half-brother of Binnya U. Her three elder sisters Mwei It, Mwei Kaw and Mwei Zeik became principal queens of Binnya U. She and Linka had two daughters—Thazin Saw Dala and Thazin Saw U—and a son, Nyi Kan-Kaung.

C. 1353, (Note: (Pan Hla 2005: 47–48): Min Linka's rebellion took place sometime after the invasion by Chiang Mai in 713 ME (1351/52) and before the death of the prized white elephant in 716 ME (1354/55).) her husband revolted against Binnya U. But the rebellion failed. Min Linka was arrested, and executed. Binnya U raised his sister-in-law to queen with the title of Thiri Maya Dewi. In 1368, they had a son named A-Pa-Thon, though he died soon after the birth in Donwun. The son later became King Razadarit.

== Bibliography ==
- Pan Hla, Nai (2005) [1968]. Razadarit Ayedawbon (in Burmese) (8th printing ed.). Yangon: Armanthit Sarpay.

Mwei Daw Hanthawaddy Dynasty Born: c. 1340s Died: c. 28 January 1368
Royal titles
Preceded by	Queen of Martaban c. 1353 – c. 28 January 1368	Succeeded by
