= Smin Maru =

General of the Royal Hanthawaddy Army (d. 1384)

Smin Maru သမိန်မရူး
- Born: c. 1350s Martaban (Mottama)?, Martaban Kingdom
- Died: 5 January 1384; Tuesday, 13th waxing of Tabodwe 745 ME; Pegu (Bago), Hanthawaddy kingdom
- Spouse: Tala Mi Thiri (c. 1372–1384)
- Military career
- Allegiance: Royal Hanthawaddy Armed Forces
- Service years: c. 1372–1384
- Rank: General
- Conflicts: Battle of Syriam (c. 1372); Battle of Dagon (1383)

Smin Maru (Burmese: သမိန်မရူး, Burmese pronunciation: [θəmèiɴ məɹú] or [θəmèiɴ məjú]; (Note: This is a Mon name. Modern Burmese pronunciations given.) also spelled Smim Maru d. 1384) was a general of the Royal Hanthawaddy Army, and a pretender to the Hanthawaddy throne. Son of a court official, Maru rose to the upper echelons of the Hanthawaddy court by marrying Princess Tala Mi Thiri. He then became a close ally and alleged lover of Princess-Regent Maha Dewi. He was executed on the order of his brother-in-law King Razadarit in 1384.

== Brief ==
Maru was not a royal but a son of a senior court official and a military commander. Maru apparently become a wealthy man by the early 1370s when he asked for the hand of Princess Tala Mi Thiri, daughter of King Binnya U. (She had just returned from Chiang Mai after a divorce from King Kue Na of Lan Na.) He is said to have offered five viss (8.16 kg) of gold in dowry. Thiri's father King Binnya U had fond memories of Maru's father, who had died in action in his service, and gave his permission. A seven-day lavish wedding between Maru and the princess followed.

Though not a military man, Maru then became a commander in the army. He was the second-in-command of the army that defeated the rebellion of Gov. Than-Byat of Syriam. The operation was orchestrated by Princess Maha Dewi, the elder sister of the king. In the following years, he became an ally of the powerful princess. According to the chronicle Razadarit Ayedawbon, three years after his marriage to Thiri, he became involved with the princess, now in her 50s. The princess gained power over the following years as her brother's health deteriorated. A key faction the Pegu court led by Chief Minister Zeik-Bye opposed the Maha Dewi–Maru faction, and they tried to undermine Maha Dewi's influence by publicizing the affair. At any rate, the Maha Dewi–Maru faction was firmly in power by the early 1380s. By 1382, she was the de facto ruler.

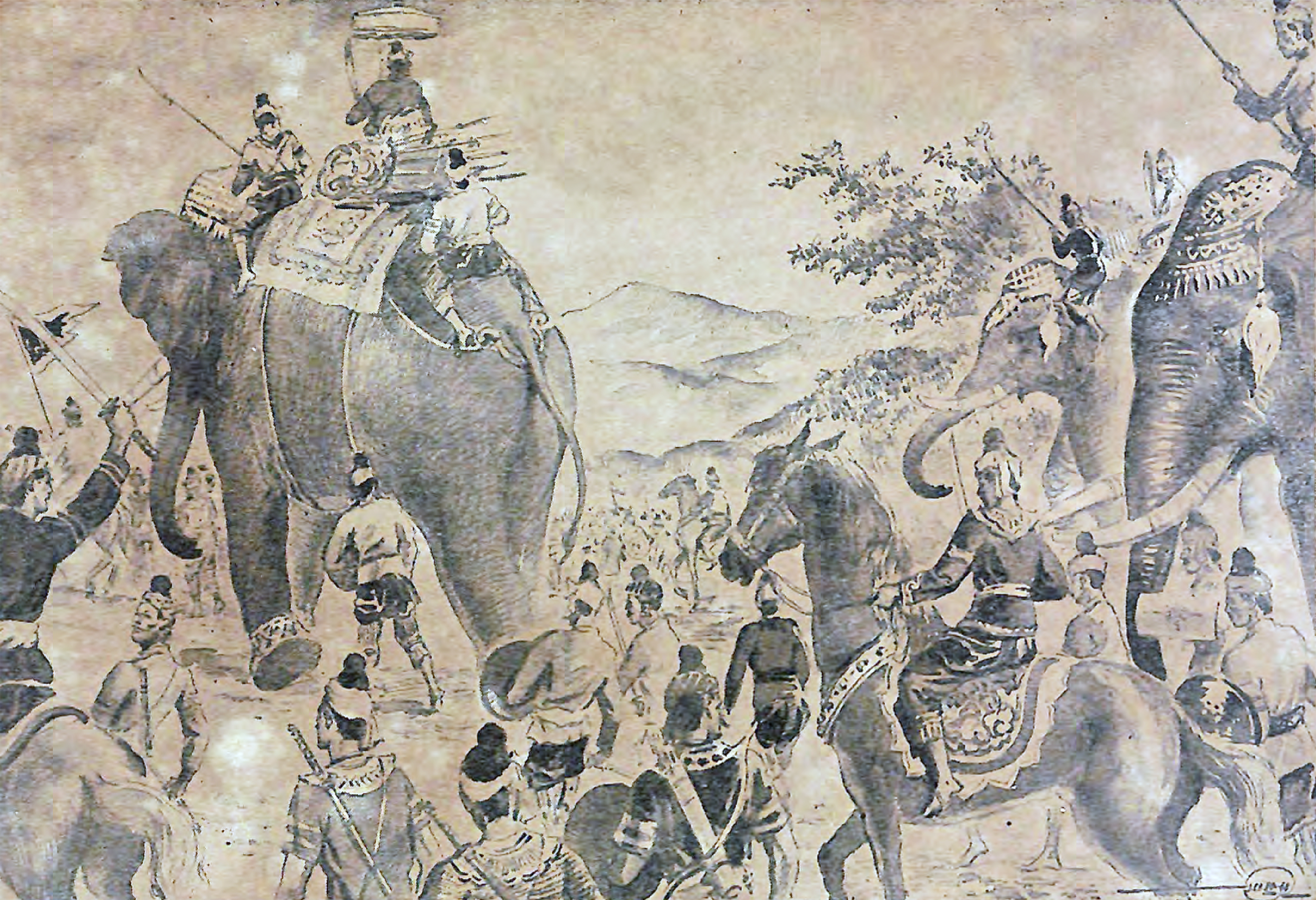
Princees Maha Dewi sent an expedition army led by Smin Maru and Zeik-Bye to suppress the rebellion of Binnya Nwe. An illustration from Rachathirat, a Thai version of Razadarit Ayedawbon, 1946 printed edition.

Maru's end came in late 1383. In October, Maha Dewi, now in her official capacity as princess regent asked Maru and Zeik-Byet to lead the Pegu army to put down Prince Binnya Nwe's rebellion at Dagon. However, Zeik-Bye secretly supported Nwe's rebellion, and provided intelligence to Nwe's camp. On 19 November, Maru's vanguard force was driven back. After Binnya U's death on 2 January 1384, Maru tried to rally the court to put him on the throne. When he found no support, he and his wife tried to flee. But they were both captured. On 5 January 1384, (Note: The chronicle Razadarit Ayedawbon (Pan Hla 2005: 158) says the coronation ceremony was held on Tuesday, 1st waxing of Tabodwe 745 ME, the day after the court had chosen Binnya Nwe as king. But 1st waxing is a typographical error. Per (Pan Hla 2005: 356, footnote 1), the Burmese language version of the chronicle states that Razadarit became king on Monday, 12th waxing of Tabodwe 745 ME (Monday, 4 Jan 1384). It means the coronation ceremony was held on Tuesday, 13th waxing of Tabodwe 745 ME (5 January 1384), and Maru died on that day.) Binnya Nwe, who became king the day before, ordered Maru's immediate execution right before proceeding to his coronation ceremony. (Maru's wife Thiri apparently escaped the execution. The chronicle does not say that the new king, who was about to take the title Razadarit, ordered the execution of his half-sister.)

== Bibliography ==
- Fernquest, Jon (Spring 2006). "Rajadhirat's Mask of Command: Military Leadership in Burma (c. 1348–1421)" (PDF). SBBR. 4 (1).
- Pan Hla, Nai (2005) [1968]. Razadarit Ayedawbon (in Burmese) (8th printing ed.). Yangon: Armanthit Sarpay.
