= List of rulers of Myinsaing =

This is a list of rulers of Myinsaing, a prominent vassal state during the Pagan, Pinya and Ava periods. During the Myinsaing Period, Athinkhaya of Myinsaing was one of the three de facto rulers—alongside his younger brothers Yazathingyan and Thihathu—of the rump Pagan Kingdom.

== Background ==
During the reign of King Narathihapate of Pagan, Myinsaing was a mere village, whose headman was Theinkha Bo. The village became a myo, a district-level town with a myoza (a royal governor), soon after King Kyawswa of Pagan came to power in 1289. The town's first governor was Theinkha Bo's eldest son Athinkhaya. (Note: Chronicle narratives are as follows: The Maha Yazawin chronicle (1724) says Yazathingyan was appointed governor of Myinsaing by King Kyawswa.; The Yazawin Thit (1798) says Athinkhaya was appointed governor by Kyawswa.; The Hmannan Yazawin (1832) accepts the Yazawin Thit's correction. It was now a myo, district-level town with a royal appointed governor.) The town became the de facto capital of the rump Pagan kingdom when Athinkhya and his two brothers—Yazathingyan and Thihathu—together overthrew King Kyawswa in 1297. During the Pinya period, Athinkhaya's successor Sithu was the regent of Pinya from 1340 to 1344.

Certainly the 19th century, Myinsaing was no longer a royal governorship. It was governed by a mayor, myothugyi although it apparently continued to be a fief awarded to members of the royal family. Myinsaing's last feudal lord was Prince Thado Minye Yanshein, who after the Third Anglo-Burmese War continued the fight against the British occupation forces until his death in 1886.

== List of rulers ==
=== Pinya and Ava periods ===
Name	Term From	Term Until	Relationship to predecessor(s)	Overlords	Notes
Athinkhaya	c. 1289 (by February 1293) (Note: Per a stone inscription dated 19 February 1293, Athinkhaya was the ruler of Myinsaing, Yazathingyan the ruler of Mekkhaya and Thihathu, the ruler of Pinle.)	13 April 1310	Appointed	Kyawswa of Pagan (1289–1297); Saw Hnit (1298–1310)	Co-Regent of Pagan (1297–1310) alongside Yazathingyan and Thihathu
Yazathingyan	1310	1312/13	Brother	Thihathu?	Assumed the title of Athinkhaya Nge (Athinkhaya II) (Note: According to a 1329 stone inscription found at Lunbogon, Kyaukse by J.A. Stewart, Yazathingyan succeeded the [Myinsaing] throne as Athinkhaya Nge (Athinkhaya the Younger).)
Sithu	1310s?	c. 1342	Brother-in-law of Athinkhaya?, appointed	Thihathu (to 1325); Uzana I of Pinya (1325–1340)	Regent of Pinya (1340–1344)
Thettawshay	c. 1342	?	Appointed	Kyawswa I of Pinya	Son-in-law of Kyawswa I
Shwe Nan Shin	?	c. 1386	Appointed	Thado Minbya?; Swa Saw Ke	Eldest sibling of King Swa Saw Ke of Ava
Thray Sithu	c. 1386	1426		Swa Saw Ke; Tarabya; Minkhaung I; Thihathu; Min Nyo	Grandson of King Uzana I of Pinya and King Swa Saw Ke of Ava
...

== List of lords ==
The following is a list of feudal lords who held Myinsaing as their fief. These lords did not have the day-to-day administrative duties, which were handled by a myothugyi (mayor).

=== Konbaung period ===
Name	Term From	Term Until	Relationship to predecessor(s)	Overlords	Notes
...
Bagyidaw	?	1819	Appointed	Bodawpaya	Lord of the 16 fiefs and Commander of the Southern Cavalry and the Northern Cavalry (Note: The 16 fiefs and the two cavalry regiments include: Sagaing, Ava (Inwa), Yadana Theinga (Shwebo), Myedu, Pyinsala, Nga Singu, Myinsaing, Pinle, Pyinsi, Kyauksauk, Taungdwingyi, Shwegyin; Commander of Southern Cavalry and Northern Cavalry)
...
Princess of Myinsaing	by 1837	1846 or later		Tharrawaddy Min	Noted poet
...
Thado Minye Yanshein	?	13 August 1886		Thibaw Min (to 1885)	Son of King Mindon Min; died on 13 August 1886

== Bibliography ==
- Aung-Thwin, Michael A. (2017). Myanmar in the Fifteenth Century. Honolulu: University of Hawai'i Press. ISBN 978-0-8248-6783-6.
- Duroiselle, Charles (1920). Report of the Superintendent, Archaeological Survey of Burma for the Year Ending 31st March 1920. Rangoon: Office of the Superintendent, Government Printing, Burma.
- Hla Pe (2015) [1965]. Arthur Thomas Hatto (ed.). An Enquiry Into the Theme of Lovers' Meetings and Partings at Dawn in Poetry. De Gruyter. ISBN 9783111703602.
- Htin Aung, Maung (1967). A History of Burma. New York and London: Cambridge University Press.
- Kala, U (2006) [1724]. Maha Yazawin (in Burmese). Vol. 1–3 (4th printing ed.). Yangon: Ya-Pyei Publishing.
- Maha Sithu (2012) [1798]. Kyaw Win; Thein Hlaing (eds.). Yazawin Thit (in Burmese). Vol. 1–3 (2nd ed.). Yangon: Ya-Pyei Publishing.
- Maung Maung Tin, U (2004) [1905]. Konbaung Set Maha Yazawin (in Burmese). Vol. 1–3. Yangon: Department of Universities History Research, University of Yangon.
- Mya Myintzu; Moe Moe Pyone; Kyaw Min (2020). "Prince Myinzaing and Early Armed Resistance Movements". Meiktila University Research Journal. XI (1). Meiktila: Meiktila University.
- Neild, Ralph; Searle, H.F.; Stewart, J.A. (1925). "Kyaukse District". Burma Gazetteer. A. Rangoon: Government Printing and Stationery, Burma.
- Royal Historical Commission of Burma (2003) [1832]. Hmannan Yazawin (in Burmese). Vol. 1–3. Yangon: Ministry of Information, Myanmar.
- Than Tun (December 1959). "History of Burma: A.D. 1300–1400". Journal of Burma Research Society. XLII (II).
