= Saw Yan Naung of Prome =

Saw Yan Naung စောရန်နောင်

Ruler of Prome
- Reign: c. 1344 – 1377/78
- Predecessor: Kyaswa
- Successor: Myet-Hna Shay
- Born: 1323/24; 685 ME; Thayet; Pinya Kingdom
- Died: 1377/78 (aged 53–54); 739 ME; Prome (Pyay); Ava Kingdom
- Spouse: ?
- Issue: at least one daughter
- House: Pinya
- Father: Min Shin Saw of Thayet
- Mother: Shin Myat Hla of Prome
- Religion: Theravada Buddhism

Saw Yan Naung (Burmese: စောရန်နောင်, [sɔ́ jàɴ nàʊ̯ɴ]; 1323/24−1377/78) was governor of Prome (Pyay) from c. 1344 to 1375 and viceroy of Prome from 1375 to 1377/78. Descended from Pagan and Pinya royalty, Saw Yan Naung was first appointed to the governorship by King Kyawswa I of Pinya. From 1367 onwards, the governor helped his brother King Swa Saw Ke of Ava consolidate the former southern vassals states of Pinya into Ava's fold.

== Early life ==
Saw Yan Naung was born to Shin Myat Hla and Gov. Min Shin Saw of Thayet, c. 1323/24. (Note: The two main standard chronicles Maha Yazawin and Hmannan Yazawin are internally inconsistent with their narratives of Saw Yan Naung. (Maha Yazawin Vol. 2 2006: 163) and (Hmannan Vol. 2 2003: 214) say that Yan Naung became governor of Prome in 685 ME (29 March 1323 to 28 March 1324). But the chronicles (Maha Yazawin Vol. 1 2006: 280) and (Hmannan Vol. 1 2003: 403) themselves say that he became governor of Prome after Kyawswa I of Pinya had become king in 704 ME (29 March 1342 to 28 March 1343). (Per contemporary inscriptional evidence (Than Tun 1959: 124), Kyawswa I became undisputed king on 29 March 1344. Thus Yan Naung most probably became governor only on or after 29 March 1344.) Moreover, he was likely born in the 1320s as his younger brother Swa Saw Ke was born on 16 July 1330 per (Zata 1960: 72). The 685 ME (1323/24) date in the chronicles may have been his birth year instead.) He was a grandson of King Kyawswa of Pagan and a grandnephew of King Thihathu of Pinya. Second of six siblings, Yan Naung had an elder brother Shwe Nan Shin, a younger brother Swa Saw Ke and three younger sisters, Saw Pale, Saw Myat and Saw Omma.

Yan Naung grew up in Thayet but spent his formative years in Launggyet, the capital of Arakan, the kingdom to the west of Thayet. In early January 1334, the Arakanese raided Thayet, and sent the entire family of the governor to Launggyet on 7 January 1334. The family was treated well at the Arakanese court where the children were educated by one of the most learned Arakanese monks of the day. In 1343/44, (Note: The Arakanese chronicle Rakhine Razawin Thit (RRT Vol. 1 1999: 181) says the family left Launggyet for Pinya in 705 ME (29 March 1343 to 28 March 1344) but the Burmese Hmannan chronicle (Hmannan Vol. 1 2003: 403) says the family returned near the end of King Uzana I c. 704 ME (29 March 1342 to 28 March 1343).) the family was allowed to leave Launggyet. Soon after their return, Kyawswa I came to power in 1344, and appointed Yan Naung governor of Prome (Pyay), a strategically important region on the Irrawaddy.

== Ruler of Prome ==
Yan Naung ruled Prome for the next three decades. Prome and its neighbor to the east Toungoo (Taungoo), the two southernmost vassal states of Pinya, practically became independent in the late 1350s when the central authority waned precipitously. Yan Naung never formally declared independence; he did not follow suit when Toungoo formally broke away in 1358/59. But he ruled like a sovereign. He apparently never supplied his share of manpower to Pinya in the latter's war effort against the Maw Shan raids either. (Note: See (Hmannan Vol. 1 2003: 384–387) for Pinya's last years 1350–64. Chronicles mention of no help from the vassals in the war effort against the Maw Shans.)

For the next decade, he practically stayed out of the endemic warfare in Upper Burma. He did not submit to Thado Minbya of Sagaing, who took over Pinya in 1364 and founded the Ava Kingdom in 1365 but did not provoke him either. Yan Naung stood by as Thado Minbya attacked Toungoo, Taungdwin and Sagu, the vassal states to the east and north of Prome in 1365–67. He finally decided to join Ava in 1367–68 after his brother Swa Saw Ke had ascended to the Ava throne.

Yan Naung's support helped Swa secure the allegiance of Sagu and Toungoo. However, Toungoo's allegiance was nominal. In the 1370s, Viceroy Pyanchi I of Toungoo forged an alliance with the southern Hanthawaddy Kingdom. At Ava (Inwa), Swa was not yet willing to go to war with Hanthawaddy over Toungoo. Instead, the king sought to eliminate Pyanchi in some other way, and enlisted Yan Naung in the plot. In 1375, Yan Naung proposed a marriage of state between his daughter and Pyanchi's son, with the marriage ceremony to be held in Prome. Pyanchi understood the proposal of marriage to be the first step toward joint rebellion against Ava, and came to Prome with a small battalion. But Yan Naung's troops ambushed the Toungoo battalion near Prome, and killed Pyanchi. The ambush was not a complete success. Pyanchi's son Pyanchi II and his son-in-law Sokkate escaped, and Toungoo would remain a nominal vassal until 1383/84. Nonetheless, Swa was pleased with the ambush, which avoided an outright rebellion, and upgraded his brother's status to viceroy.

The viceroy died soon after in 1377/78. (Note: Chronicle reporting is inconsistent. (Hmannan Vol. 2 2003: 214) says Saw Yan Naung died in 739 ME (29 March 1377 to 29 March 1378). However, (Hmannan Vol. 1 2003: 416) says Saw Yan Naung died in 747 ME (29 March 1385 to 29 March 1386), before the start of Forty Years' War. Scholarship (Yazawin Thit Vol. 1 2012: 326, footnote 1) accepts the 739 ME date.) He was succeeded by his nephew Myet-Hna Shay as governor.

== Ancestry ==
Ancestry of Saw Yan Naung

8. Narathihapate
4. Kyawswa of Pagan
9. Shin Hpa of Pagan
2. Min Shin Saw of Thayet
10. Yazathingyan of Pagan
5. Saw Soe of Pagan
11. Saw Khin Htut of Pagan
1. Saw Yan Naung
12. Narathihapate
6. Thihathu of Prome
13. Shin Mauk of Pagan
3. Shin Myat Hla of Prome
14. Theinkha Bo
7. Atula Dewi of Prome
15. Lady Myinsaing

== Bibliography ==
- Htin Aung, Maung (1967). A History of Burma. New York and London: Cambridge University Press.
- Kala, U (2006) [1724]. Maha Yazawin (in Burmese). Vol. 1–3 (4th printing ed.). Yangon: Ya-Pyei Publishing.
- Maha Sithu (2012) [1798]. Myint Swe; Kyaw Win; Thein Hlaing (eds.). Yazawin Thit (in Burmese). Vol. 1–3 (2nd printing ed.). Yangon: Ya-Pyei Publishing.
- Royal Historians of Burma (1960) [c. 1680]. U Hla Tin (Hla Thamein) (ed.). Zatadawbon Yazawin (in Burmese). Historical Research Directorate of the Union of Burma.
- Royal Historical Commission of Burma (2003) [1832]. Hmannan Yazawin (in Burmese). Vol. 1–3. Yangon: Ministry of Information, Myanmar.
- Sandamala Linkara, Ashin (1997–1999) [1931]. Rakhine Razawin Thit (in Burmese). Vol. 1–2. Yangon: Tetlan Sarpay.
- Sein Lwin Lay, Kahtika U (2006) [1968]. Mintaya Shwe Hti and Bayinnaung: Ketumadi Taungoo Yazawin (in Burmese) (2nd printing ed.). Yangon: Yan Aung Sarpay.
- Than Tun (December 1959). "History of Burma: A.D. 1300–1400". Journal of Burma Research Society. XLII (II).

Saw Yan Naung of Prome Pinya Kingdom Born: 1323/24 Died: 1377/78
Royal titles
Preceded by Kyaswa	Ruler of Prome c. 1344 – 1377/78	Succeeded by Myet-Hna Shay
