= Battle of Pagan =

1287 battle in Southeast Asia

- Part of the Mongol invasion of Burma
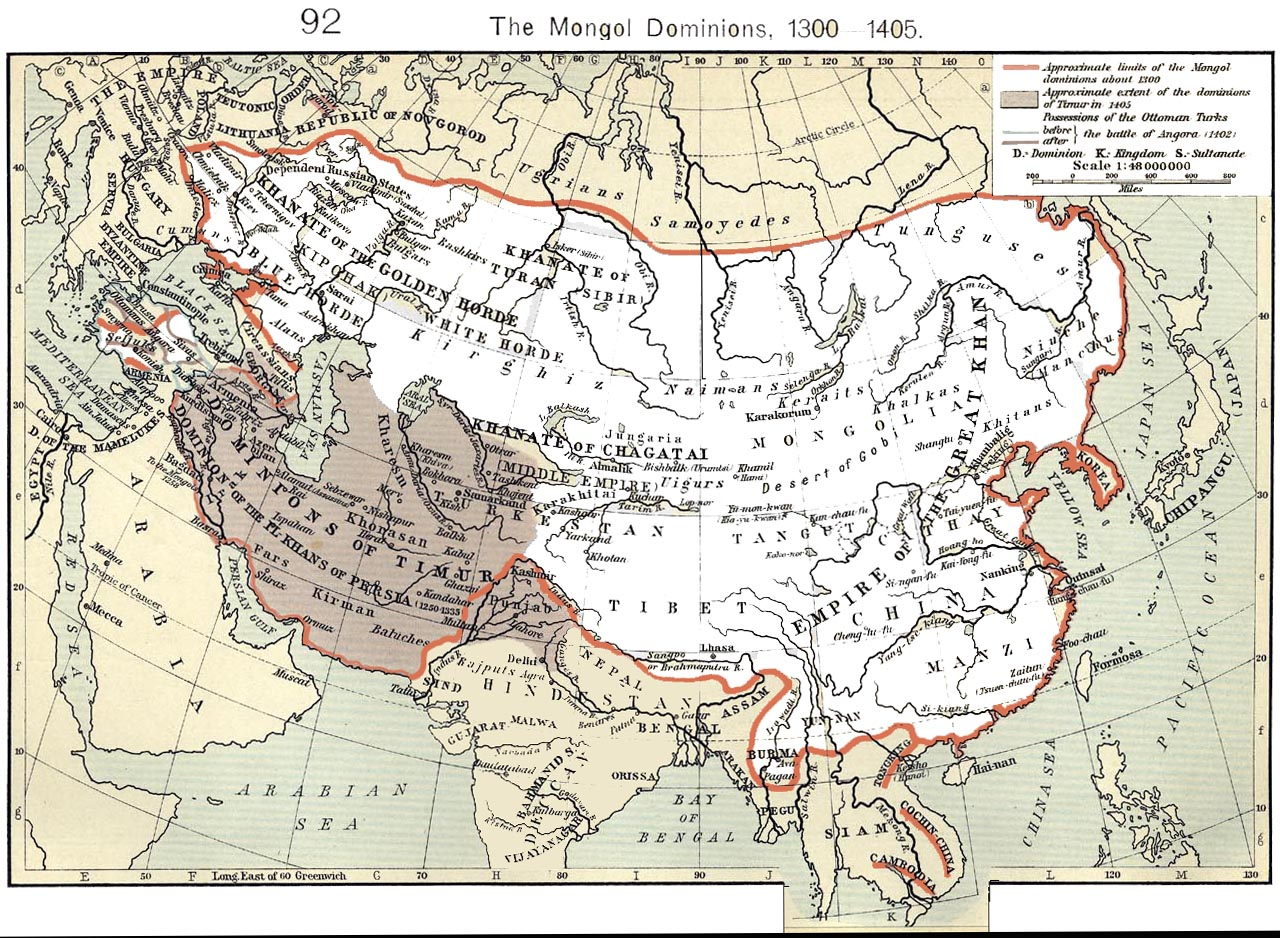
- Mongol Empire's largest extent outlined in red; Timur-i-Lenk's empire is shaded.
Date	December 1287
Location	Pagan
Result	See aftermath; Mongol advance halted; Collapse of the Pagan Empire

Belligerents
Pagan Kingdom	Yuan dynasty

Commanders and leaders
Athinkhaya; Yazathingyan; Thihathu	Temür Khan

Strength
5,000–7,000	7,000–30,000

Casualties and losses
Moderate	Heavy

The Battle of Pagan was fought in 1287 between the Yuan dynasty of China and the Pagan Kingdom of Burma. Although the Mongol advance was halted, the war ended the Pagan Kingdom as a polity, which disintegrated into several small kingdoms.

== Overview ==
The battle was initiated by the Yuan dynasty, which sensed an opportunity in the political turmoil caused by their successful 1283 invasion of the Pagan Empire in the Battle of Bhamo. After Bhamo, the Yuan army penetrated the Irrawaddy River valley and established garrisons there. The political turmoil of these events tempted Kublai Khan's grandson Esen-Temür, who was stationed in Yunnan, into action. Temür led a large army down the Irrawaddy river valley and attempted to capture Pagan city.

The Burmese king Narathihapate fled Pagan to Lower Burma leaving the Burmese defenses under the three brother commanders of Myinsaing, Athinkhaya, Yazathingyan, and Thihathu. The king is remembered in Burmese history as Tayokpyemin (lit. "the king who ran away from the Chinese"). According to mainstream traditional (colonial-era) scholarship, the Mongol army ignored the imperial orders to evacuate; fought its way down to Pagan with the loss of 7000 men; occupied the city; and sent out detachments to receive homage, one of which reached south of Prome. But not all colonial period scholars agreed with the assessment as none of the contemporary Mongol/Chinese records specifically mentioned the conquest of Pagan or the temporary completeness of the conquest.

Recent research shows that the Mongol forces most probably never reached Pagan. They were held at bay by the Burmese defenses led by commanders Athinkhaya, Yazathingyan and Thihathu, and probably never got closer than 160 km north of Pagan. (An inscription dated 16 February 1293 by the three brothers claimed that they defeated the Mongol army.) Even if the Mongols did reach Pagan, the damage they inflicted was probably minimal. At any rate, the Mongol army suffered heavy casualties, and retreated north to Tagaung. They remained there as the treaty was now void.

== Aftermath ==
In Lower Burma, the king was promptly assassinated by one of his sons, Thihathu of Prome. The 250-year-old Pagan Empire now disintegrated. The kingdom was fractured into several small power centers as the Yuan dynasty did not fill the power vacuum in the searing Irrawaddy valley. The Yuan army instead stayed farther north in Tagaung (present-day northern Mandalay Region).

In central Burma, another son of Narathihapate, Kyawswa, was installed as king by dowager queen Saw. But Kyawswa controlled only the immediate surrounding area of Pagan. Even in central Burma, the real power rested with three Pagan military commanders who through their small but well-disciplined army controlled the Kyaukse district, the most important granary of Pagan and were considered heroes for finally halting the seemingly endless Mongol horde. Kyawswa had no choice but to recognize them as lords of Kyaukse. The brothers increasingly acted like sovereigns. Nearly ten years after the fall of Pagan, Kyawswa decided to become a Yuan vassal in January 1297. He received official recognition from the Yuan dynasty as the ruler of Burma in March 1298. Unsatisfied with their reduced status, the brothers dethroned Kyawswa in December 1298, and founded the Myinsaing Kingdom, officially ending the Pagan Kingdom. The Mongol army's effort to install their new nominee, one of Kyawswa's sons, to the Pagan throne in 1301 was unsuccessful. Two years later, in 1303, the Yuan court decided to withdraw completely from Upper Burma, and the Yuan army left Tagaung.
