= Saw Myat of Sagu =

Saw Myat စောမြတ်

Duchess of Sagu
- Tenure: c. 1360s – 1390s
- Born: c. 1332 c. 694 ME; Thayet; Pinya Kingdom
- Spouse: Theinkhathu of Sagu
- Issue: Theinkhathu of Taungdwin
- House: Pinya
- Father: Min Shin Saw of Thayet
- Mother: Shin Myat Hla of Prome
- Religion: Theravada Buddhism

Saw Myat (Burmese: စောမြတ်, pronounced [sɔ́ mjaʔ]; also known as Saw Myat Ke) was duchess of Sagu from the 1360s to 1390s. She was a sister of King Swa Saw Ke of Ava, and the paternal grandmother of Queen Shin Bo-Me.

== Ancestry ==
Saw Myat was descended from the Pagan royalty from both sides, and was a grandniece of King Thihathu of Pinya.

Ancestry of Saw Myat of Sagu

8. Narathihapate
4. Kyawswa of Pagan
9. Shin Hpa of Pagan
2. Min Shin Saw of Thayet
10. Yazathingyan of Pagan
5. Saw Soe of Pagan
11. Saw Khin Htut of Pagan
1. Saw Myat
12. Narathihapate
6. Thihathu of Prome
13. Shin Mauk of Pagan
3. Shin Myat Hla of Prome
14. Theinkha Bo
7. Atula Dewi of Prome
15. Lady Myinsaing

== Bibliography ==
- Royal Historical Commission of Burma (2003) [1832]. Hmannan Yazawin (in Burmese). Vol. 1–3. Yangon: Ministry of Information, Myanmar.

Saw Myat of Sagu Ava Kingdom Born: c. 1332
Royal titles
Preceded by	Duchess of Sagu c. 1360s – 1390s	Succeeded by
