= Shwe Nan Shin of Myinsaing =

Shwe Nan Shin of Myinsaing; မြင်စိုင်း ရွှေနန်းရှင်

Governor of Myinsaing
- Reign: ? – c. 1386?
- Predecessor: Thettawshay
- Successor: Thray Sithu
- Born: by 1322; by 684 ME; Thayet; Pinya Kingdom
- Died: 1386? Myinsaing
- Issue: Myet-Hna Shay; unnamed daughter
- House: Pinya
- Father: Min Shin Saw of Thayet
- Mother: Shin Myat Hla of Prome
- Religion: Theravada Buddhism

Shwe Nan Shin (Burmese: ရွှေနန်းရှင်, pronounced [ʃwè náɴ ʃɪ̀ɴ]) was governor of Myinsaing in the mid-14th century. He was the eldest sibling of King Swa Saw Ke of Ava. He became governor of Myinsaing during the Pinya period. (Note: Chronicles (Hmannan Vol. 1 2003: 403) say that he was appointed governor in 704 ME (29 March 1342 to 28 March 1343) by King Uzana I of Pinya. But the Arakanese chronicle Rakhine Razawin Thit (Sandamala Linkara Vol. 1 1999: 181) says the family of Min Shin Saw left Launggyet for Pinya in 705 ME (29 March 1343 to 28 March 1344). According to a contemporary inscription, (Than Tun 1959: 124), Kyawswa I of Pinya took over the kingdom from then regent Sithu.)

== Ancestry ==
Shwe Nan Shin was descended from the Pagan royalty from both sides, and was a grandnephew of King Thihathu of Pinya.

Ancestry of Shwe Nan Shin of Myinsaing

8. Narathihapate
4. Kyawswa of Pagan
9. Shin Hpa of Pagan
2. Min Shin Saw of Thayet
10. Yazathingyan of Pagan
5. Saw Soe of Pagan
11. Saw Khin Htut of Pagan
1. Shwe Nan Shin
12. Narathihapate
6. Thihathu of Prome
13. Shin Mauk of Pagan
3. Shin Myat Hla of Prome
14. Theinkha Bo
7. Atula Dewi of Prome
15. Lady Myinsaing

== Bibliography ==
- Kala, U (2006) [1724]. Maha Yazawin (in Burmese). Vol. 1–3 (4th printing ed.). Yangon: Ya-Pyei Publishing.
- Maha Sithu (2012) [1798]. Kyaw Win; Thein Hlaing (eds.). Yazawin Thit (in Burmese). Vol. 1–3 (2nd ed.). Yangon: Ya-Pyei Publishing.
- Royal Historical Commission of Burma (2003) [1832]. Hmannan Yazawin (in Burmese). Vol. 1–3. Yangon: Ministry of Information, Myanmar.
- Sandamala Linkara, Ashin (1931). Rakhine Razawin Thit (in Burmese). Vol. 1–2 (1997–1999 ed.). Yangon: Tetlan Sarpay.
- Than Tun (December 1959). "History of Burma: A.D. 1300–1400". Journal of Burma Research Society. XLII (II).

Shwe Nan Shin of Myinsaing Ava Kingdom Born: c. 1322 Died: ?
Royal titles
Preceded by Sithu	Governor of Myinsaing c. 1344 – ?	Succeeded by Thettawshay
