= Min Shin Saw of Thayet =

Min Shin Saw; မင်းရှင်စော

Governor of Thayet
- Reign: c. 1300–1334; 1343–c. 1350s
- Born: 1280s Pagan (Bagan)
- Died: 1350s? Thayet
- Spouse: Shin Myat Hla; unnamed wife
- Issue: Shwe Nan Shin; Saw Yan Naung; Swa Saw Ke; Saw Pale; Saw Myat; Saw Omma; Thinkhaya of Pagan
- House: Pagan
- Father: Kyawswa of Pagan
- Mother: Saw Soe of Pagan
- Religion: Theravada Buddhism

Min Shin Saw (Burmese: မင်းရှင်စော, pronounced [mɪ́ɴ ʃɪ̀ɴ sɔ́]) was an early 14th-century governor of Thayet in the Pinya Kingdom. He was a son of King Kyawswa of Pagan and the father of King Swa Saw Ke of Ava, Queen Saw Omma of Pinya.

== Brief ==
Min Shin Saw was the second son of King Kyawswa of Pagan and his chief queen Saw Soe. His father was overthrown by the three brothers of Myinsaing (Athinhkaya, Yazathingyan and Thihathu) on 17 December 1297. The three brothers executed Kyawswa on 10 May 1299 but with the dowager queen Pwa Saw's advice, they agreed to appoint the sons of Kyawswa by his queen Saw Soe, Saw Hnit and Min Shin Saw viceroys of Pagan (Bagan) and Thayet respectively.

Both Saw Hnit and Min Shin Saw pledged allegiance to the three brothers, who were now co-kings of the Myinsaing Kingdom. Min Shin Saw married Shin Myat Hla of Prome, his second cousin and the niece of the brothers. In 1315, the Myinsaing Kingdom split into two parts, and Min Shin Saw's territory became part of the Pinya Kingdom. His region bordered the western kingdom of Arakan (present-day Rakhine State). Min Shin Saw and his family were taken to Launggyet on 7 January 1334 by the Arakanese army which raided Thayet. The family was treated well at Launggyet where the children were educated by one of the most learned monks there. Circa 1343, (Note: The Arakanese chronicle Rakhine Razawin Thit (Sandamala Linkara Vol. 1 1997: 181) says the family left Launggyet for Pinya in 705 ME (28 March 1343 to 27 March 1344) but the Burmese Hmannan chronicle (Hmannan Vol. 1 2003: 403) says the family returned near the end of King Uzana I's reign: c. 704 ME (28 March 1342 to 27 March 1343). According to inscriptional evidence (Than Tun 1959: 124), Uzana I's reign ended on 1 September 1340.) the entire family was allowed to return to Pinya where her father was reappointed to his old position at Thayet.

== Ancestry ==
The following is the ancestry of Min Shin Saw as reported by the Hmannan Yazawin chronicle (Hmannan Vol. 1 2003: 360, 402–403). He was descended from Pagan kings from both sides. His parents were second cousins, once removed.

Ancestry of Min Shin Saw

8. Uzana of Pagan
4. Narathihapate
9. Su Le Htone of Pagan
2. Kyawswa of Pagan
10. unnamed
5. Shin Hpa of Pagan
11. unnamed
1. Min Shin Saw
12. unnamed
6. Yazathingyan of Pagan
13. unnamed
3. Saw Soe of Pagan
14. Kyaswa of Pagan
7. Saw Khin Htut of Pagan
15. Yaza Dewi of Pagan

== Notes ==
Min Shin Saw of Thayet Pinya Kingdom Born: c. 1280s Died: c. 1350s
Royal titles
Preceded by	Governor of Thayet c. 1330–1334; 1343–c. 1350s	Succeeded by

== Bibliography ==
- Htin Aung, Maung (1967). A History of Burma. New York and London: Cambridge University Press.
- Royal Historical Commission of Burma (2003) [1832]. Hmannan Yazawin (in Burmese). Vol. 1–3. Yangon: Ministry of Information, Myanmar.
- Sandamala Linkara, Ashin (1997–1999) [1931]. Rakhine Razawin Thit (in Burmese). Vol. 1–2. Yangon: Tetlan Sarpay.
- Than Tun (December 1959). "History of Burma: A.D. 1300–1400". Journal of Burma Research Society. XLII (II).
