= Shin Myat Hla of Prome =

Shin Myat Hla; ရှင်မြတ်လှ

Duchess of Thayet
- Reign: ?–1334; 1343–?
- Born: c. 1288
- Died: ? Thayet?
- Spouse: Min Shin Saw of Thayet
- Issue: Shwe Nan Shin; Saw Yan Naung; Swa Saw Ke; Saw Pale; Saw Myat; Saw Omma
- House: Pagan
- Father: Thihathu of Prome
- Mother: Atula Dewi of Prome
- Religion: Theravada Buddhism

Shin Myat Hla (Burmese: ရှင်မြတ်လှ, pronounced [ʃɪ̀ɴ mjaʔ l̥a̰]) was the mother of King Swa Saw Ke of Ava and Queen Saw Omma of Pinya. Her husband Min Shin Saw was governor of Thayet.

== Ancestry ==
The following is the ancestry of Shin Myat Hla as reported by the Hmannan Yazawin chronicle (Hmannan Vol. 1 2003: 358, 360, 402–403). She was a granddaughter of King Narathihapate of Pagan, and a niece of King Thihathu of Pinya.

Ancestry of Myat Hla

8. Uzana of Pagan
4. Narathihapate
9. Su Le Hton of Pagan
2. Thihathu of Prome
10. unnamed
5. Shin Mauk of Pagan
11. unnamed
1. Myat Hla
12. Binnaka Sawbwa
6. Theinkha Bo
13. unnamed
3. Atula Dewi of Prome
14. unnamed
7. Lady Myinsaing
15. unnamed

== Bibliography ==
- Royal Historical Commission of Burma (2003) [1832]. Hmannan Yazawin (in Burmese). Vol. 1–3. Yangon: Ministry of Information, Myanmar.
