= Second Mongol invasion of Burma =

1300–1 military campaign

- Part of the Mongol invasions and conquests
| Date | January 1300 – 8 April 1301 |
| Location | Burma |
| Result | Decisive Burmese victory, Mongols abandon attempts to conquer Burma |

Belligerents
| Yuan dynasty | Myinsaing Kingdom |

Commanders and leaders
| Temür Khan; Mangu Turumish; Kumara Kassapa | Athinkhaya; Yazathingyan; Thihathu |

Strength
| 12,000 | Unknown |

Casualties and losses
| Unknown | Unknown |

The second Mongol invasion of Burma by the Yuan dynasty under Temür Khan was repulsed by the Burmese Myinsaing Kingdom in 1301.

== Background ==
After the first invasion by the Yuan dynasty, Narathihapate fled Pagan. Already experienced commanders, the brothers Athinkhaya, Yazathingyan, and Thihathu strengthened their garrison at Myinsaing. After the Mongols left, Kyawswa succeeded his father Narathihapate. But he was just a nominal king of Pagan for he controlled no more than a few miles outside Pagan. Indeed, the Pagan Empire had ceased to exist. Instead, the real power in central Burma rested with the brothers who through their small but well-disciplined army controlled the Kyaukse district, the most important granary of Pagan. Kyawswa had no choice but to recognize them as lords of Kyaukse. On 19 February 1293 (12th waxing of Tabaung 654 ME), the king appointed the eldest brother as viceroy of Myinsaing, the second brother as viceroy of Mekkhaya, and the third brother as viceroy of Pinle.

The brothers already behaved like sovereign kings nonetheless. When King Wareru of Hanthawaddy (Lower Burma) received recognition as a tributary of the Sukhothai Kingdom in 1294, it was the brothers, not Kyawswa, who sent a force to reclaim the former Pagan territory of Hanthawaddy. While their attempt to reconquer Hanthawaddy was unsuccessful, it left no doubt as to who held the real power in central Burma.

With the three brothers increasingly acting as sovereign kings, Kyawswa sent his son to the Mongols army base in Tagaung and asked for recognition as their vassal king in January 1297. He received the official recognition and a Chinese title on 20 March 1297. In December, the brothers invited the now puppet king to Myinsaing, their stronghold, to take part in the dedication ceremony of a monastery built by them. The king, with the backing of the Mongols, felt secure and went to Myinsaing. But as soon as the ceremony was over, he was arrested, dethroned, and forced to become a monk in the very monastery he had just dedicated.

== Invasion ==
On 17 December 1297, the three brothers overthrew Kyawswa, and founded the Myinsaing Kingdom. At Pagan, Kyawswa's son Saw Hnit was elected king by the dowager Queen Saw but soon became a governor under the authority of Myinsaing. Another of Kyawswa's sons, Kumara Kassapa, escaped to China. The Yuan dynasty did not know about the dethronement until June–July 1298. In 1300, the Myinsaing forces led by Athinkhaya attacked the Mongol garrisons north of Mandalay named Nga Singu and Male. On 22 June 1300, the Mongol Emperor declared that Kumara Kassapa was the rightful king of Burma, and sent in an army from Yunnan. The invasion force reached Myinsaing on 25 January 1301, surrounding the city using the element of surprise but could not break through. The besiegers took bribes from the three brothers, and began their withdrawal on 6 April 1301, completed two days later. The Yuan government at Yunnan executed their commanders but sent no more invasions. They withdrew entirely from Upper Burma starting on 4 April 1303.

By then, the city of Pagan, once home to 200,000 people, had been reduced to a small town, never to regain its preeminence. (It survived into the 15th century as a human settlement.) The brothers appointed one of Kyawswa's sons as the governor of Pagan. Anawrahta's line continued to rule Pagan as governors under Myinsaing, Pinya and Ava kingdoms until 1369. The male side of Pagan ended there although the female side passed into Pinya and Ava royalty. But the Pagan line continued to be claimed by successive Burmese dynasties down to the last Burmese dynasty Konbaung.

== See also ==
- Sino–Burmese War (1765–1769)
