= Nawrahta of Kanni =

Nawrahta of Kanni; ကန်းနီ နော်ရထာ

Governor of Kanni
- Reign: 1349 – 1364?

Governor of Pinle
- Reign: 29 March 1344 – c. April 1349
- Predecessor: Kyawswa I (as Viceroy)
- Successor: Min Letwe

Governor of Shisha
- Reign: 7 February 1313 – 29 March 1344
- Born: c. 1300s Pinle
- Issue: Thettawshay of Dabayin
- Father: Thihathu
- Mother: Mi Saw U
- Religion: Theravada Buddhism

Nawrahta of Kanni (Burmese: ကန်းနီ နော်ရထာ, pronounced [káɴnì nɔ̀jətʰà]; also spelled ကန္နီ နော်ရထာ, [kàɴnì nɔ̀jətʰà]) was a senior Myinsaing prince, who held important governorship positions in the rival Burmese-speaking kingdoms of Pinya and Sagaing. He was the youngest child of King Thihathu and his chief queen Mi Saw U, and the youngest brother of kings Uzana I and Kyawswa I of Pinya.

Nawrahta was given the town of Shisha (ရှိရှား) in fief on 7 February 1313 by Thihathu. He remained loyal to his father's Pinya faction when the Myinsaing Kingdom split into Pinya and Sagaing kingdoms in 1315. He remained loyal to Pinya throughout the reigns of Uzana I and Sithu. On 29 March 1344, (Note: Chronicles (Hmannan Vol. 1 2003: 380) say Kyawswa I came to power in 704 ME (28 March 1342 to 27 March 1343). But inscriptional evidence (Than Tun 1959: 124) shows he came to power on 29 March 1344.) Kyawswa I succeeded the Pinya throne and appointed his younger brother Nawrahta governor of the important city of Pinle, their ancestral base. But two brothers became rivals, and in 1349, (Note: Per inscriptional evidence (Yazawin Thit Vol. 1 2012: 175, footnotes 5 and 6), Nawrahta Minye reigned for seven months and was alive on 8 November 1349 (Sunday, 13th waning of Tazaungmon 711 ME).) Nawrahta fled west to Sagaing where his nephew Nawrahta Minye had just become king. Nawrahta Minye appointed Nawrahta governor of Kanni.

All royal chronicles from Maha Yazawin (1724) onward identify Nawrahta of Kanni as an ancestor (maternal great-great-great grandfather) of King Bayinnaung of Toungoo Dynasty.

== Bibliography ==
- Royal Historical Commission of Burma (2003) [1832]. Hmannan Yazawin (in Burmese). Vol. 1–3. Yangon: Ministry of Information, Myanmar.
- Sein Lwin Lay, Kahtika U (2006) [1968]. Mintaya Shwe Hti and Bayinnaung: Ketumadi Taungoo Yazawin (in Burmese) (2nd printing ed.). Yangon: Yan Aung Sarpay.
- Than Tun (December 1959). "History of Burma: A.D. 1300–1400". Journal of Burma Research Society. XLII (II).
- Thaw Kaung, U (2010). Aspects of Myanmar History and Culture. Yangon: Gangaw Myaing.

Nawrahta of Kanni Myinsaing Dynasty
Royal titles
Preceded by	Governor of Kanni; 1349–1364?	Succeeded by
Preceded by Kyawswa I	Governor of Pinle; 29 March 1344 – c. April 1349	Succeeded by Min Letwe
Preceded by	Governor of Shisha; 7 February 1313 – 29 March 1344	Succeeded by
