= Yazathingyan =

Yazathingyan ရာဇသင်္ကြန်

Co-Regent of Myinsaing
- Reign: 17 December 1297 – 1312/13
- Predecessor: new office
- Successor: Thihathu (King of Myinsaing–Pinya)

Viceroy of Mekkhaya
- Reign: 19 February 1293 – 17 December 1297
- Predecessor: new office
- Born: c. 1263; Myinsaing
- Died: before 7 February 1313; Mekkhaya
- House: Myinsaing
- Father: Theinkha Bo
- Mother: Lady Myinsaing
- Religion: Theravada Buddhism

Yazathingyan (Rah-zuh-THIN-Jan ;Burmese: ရာဇသင်္ကြန်, pronounced [jàza̰ θɪ́ɰ̃dʑàɰ̃]; Pali: Rājasaṅkran; c. 1263 – c. 1312/13) was a co-founder of Myinsaing Kingdom in present-day Central Burma (Myanmar). As a senior commander in the Royal Army of the Pagan Empire, he, along with his two brothers Athinkhaya and Thihathu, led Pagan's successful defense of central Burma against the Mongol invasions in 1287. Following the collapse of the Pagan Empire, the brothers became rivals of King Kyawswa of Pagan in central Burma, and overthrew him in December 1297, nine months after Kyawswa became a Mongol vassal. They successfully defended the second Mongol invasion (1300–01), and emerged the sole rulers of central Burma.

== Early life ==
Yazathingyan was born c. 1263 to a prominent family in Myinsaing in Central Burma. His father Theinkha Bo was a younger brother of the sawbwa (chief) of Binnaka, and had fled to Myinsaing after a dispute with his brother in 1260. Traditional (British colonial era) scholarship identifies his father as an ethnic Shan. But the historian Michael Aung-Thwin has rejected the assertion, given that no historical evidence any kind exists to support the claim. (Note: (Aung-Thwin 1996: 884–885): Arthur Phayre was the first one to make the assertion, based purely on the chronicles' use of sawbwa, equating the office with ethnicity. GE Harvey (Harvey 1925: 76) inserted the word "Shan", in what he claimed was the direct quote from Hmannan, which says no such thing. In all, no historical evidence of any kind (in Burmese, Shan or anything else) that indicates the ethnicity of their father or the three brothers exists.) At any rate, Theinkha Bo married a daughter of a wealthy banker at Myinsaing. (Note: (Maha Yazawin Vol. 1 2006: 254): His mother was from a wealthy but commoner athi (အသည်) family. (Aung-Thwin 1996: 884): The athi were a class of people not attached to the crown or the sangha.) Yazathingyan was the second child of the couple's four children. He had an elder brother Athinkhaya, a younger brother Thihathu, and a younger sister Hla Myat. (Note: Chronicles Zatadawbon Yazawin (Zata 1960: 42) and Maha Yazawin (Maha Yazawin Vol. 1 2006: 258–259) both say that Yazathingyan was the eldest, followed by Athinkhaya, Thihathu and their sister. But Yazawin Thit (Yazawin Thit Vol. 1 2012: 156–157) corrects it based on a contemporary inscription. Subsequent chronicles (Hmannan, Dutiya Hmannan) and scholarship accept Athinkhaya as the eldest.)

== Royal service ==
Yazathingyan entered the royal service of King Narathihapate, following the footsteps of Athinkhaya, and was joined by Thihathu. The three brothers distinguished themselves in the war with the Mongols, which began in 1277. Both Athinkhaya and Hla Myat married into the royal family.

In 1285, the three brothers, still in their twenties, came to lead the defense of Central Burma. The army had been defeated in northern Burma by the Mongols in the previous dry-seasons (1283–85). Over the next two years, they manned the front (north of present-day Mandalay) while the king and his court relocated to Lower Burma. It was probably during this period that the brothers were given the official titles of Athinkhaya, Yazathingyan and Thihathu by which they would be known in history. (Note: (Than Tun 1959: 121): The three brothers are mentioned in an inscription dated 13 February 1289 as Athinkhaya, Yazathingyan and Thihathura. Since Kyawswa would not become king until 30 May 1289, they must have been awarded the titles by Narathihapate.) The king later accepted the Mongol suzerainty in January 1287 but was assassinated on 1 July 1287. When the Mongols at Tagaung invaded southward, the brothers successfully held the Mongols, who after taking heavy casualties retreated to their base in Tagaung.

== Rise to power in Central Burma ==
=== Viceroy of Mekkhaya ===
The country fell into anarchy. The Mongols at Tagaung decided not to get involved, leaving the power vacuum unfilled. In Central Burma, the brothers officially took over the leadership of the army, and consolidated their hold of the Kyaukese region, the main granary of the Pagan Kingdom. One of Narathihapate's sons Kyawswa eventually emerged king at Pagan on 30 May 1289 but Kyawswa did not control much beyond the capital. The real power in Central Burma now belonged to the brothers. On 19 February 1293, Kyawswa tried to buy their loyalty by appointing them viceroys of Kyuakse: Athinkhaya as viceroy of Myinsaing, Yazathingyan as viceroy of Mekkhaya and Thihathu as viceroy of Pinle. The territories they were given to govern were small but the king himself ruled a small region around the capital. The brothers took the title of viceroy but did not think much of the "king". Their commemorative inscription of their appointment as viceroy actually states that they were equal to the king, and reminds that it was them who defeated the Mongols in 1287. When Martaban (Mottama) in Lower Burma, which had been in revolt since 1285 and officially declared independence from Pagan since 1287, became a vassal of Sukhothai in 1293, it was the brothers who marched to retake the former Pagan territory. Although they were driven back by 1296, it left no doubt as to who held the real power in Central Burma.

=== Overthrow of Kyawswa ===
In the following years, the brothers continued to consolidate power in Central Burma. Their youngest brother Thihathu was the least diplomatic, proclaiming himself hsinbyushin (ဆင်ဖြူရှင်, "Lord of the White Elephant") in 1295 and mingyi (မင်းကြီး, "Great King") in 1296. Though Athinkhaya and Yazathingyan may have tolerated their brother's declarations, Kyawswa felt threatened by them. In January 1297, Kyawswa decided to ask for the protection of the Mongols, and was recognized by the Mongol emperor Temür Khan as King of Pagan on 20 March 1297. The emperor also gave Chinese titles to the brothers as subordinates of Kyawswa. The brothers ultimately decided to overthrow Kyawswa and face the Mongols. On 17 December 1297, with the help of the dowager queen Pwa Saw, they overthrew Kyawswa, and installed one of Kyawswa's sons, Saw Hnit as their puppet king. The brothers now ruled Central Burma as co-regents from their respective capitals of Myinsaing, Mekkhaya and Pinle.

== Co-regency ==
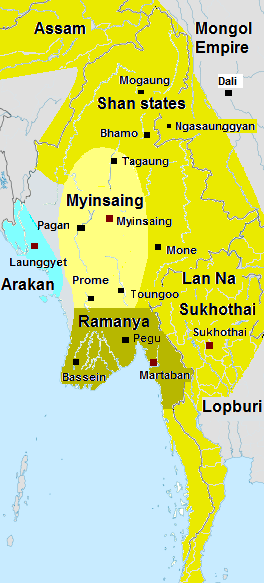
Myinsaing Kingdom c. 1310

=== Second Mongol invasion ===
After the overthrow, the brothers braced for a reprisal by the Mongols. But the expected reprisal never came. They became bolder, and allowed Saw Hnit to give his first audience on 8 May 1299. Two days later, they executed Kyawswa and his eldest son Theingapati. Another son of Kyawswa, Kumara Kassapa, escaped to Yunnan in September 1299 to seek the help of the Mongols. In January 1300, the brothers decided to force the issue by attacking and occupying southernmost Mongol garrisons at Singu and Male. The Mongol government at Yunnan could not respond until a year later, sending a 12,000-strong army. The brothers decided to face the Mongols in Central Burma at their heavily fortified city of Myinsaing. The Mongol army began the siege of Myinsaing on 25 January 1301, and launched a major attack on the fort on 28 February 1301. The attack failed. On 12 March 1301, Athinkhaya, with his brothers' support, made an offer to the Mongol command, to give them a bribe in exchange for their withdrawal. The Mongol command agreed. On 6 April 1301, upon receiving a bribe of 800 taels (30 kg) of gold and 2200 taels (83 kg) of silver, the Mongol army began their withdrawal. The Yunnan government did not agree with the withdrawal; the two senior Mongol commanders were executed for abandoning the original mission. Nonetheless, the Mongols did not send another expedition, and withdrew altogether from northern Burma two years later.

=== Post-invasion ===
The Mongols left northern Burma to their nominal vassals, the Shan states. The brothers were able to extend their influence as far north as Tagaung but no further. The brothers' joint-rule survived despite Thihathu's ambitions. The youngest brother assumed a royal title of Ananda Thiha Thura Zeya Dewa in 1306, and proclaimed himself king on 20 October 1309. It is not known what the two elder brothers made of the proclamations. At any rate, Athinkhaya died on 13 April 1310 and the two younger brothers were still alive. According to the main chronicles, Yazathingyan passed to the background and died in 1312/13. (Note: The main chronicles before Hmannan all say Yazathingyan died in 674 ME (1312/13): see (Zata 1960: 43), (Maha Yazawin Vol. 1 2006: 259) and (Yazawin Thit Vol. 1 2012: 156–157). Hmannan (Hmannan Vol. 1 2003: 369) in contradiction to the prior chronicles says Yazathingyan died in 665 ME (1303/04) but inscriptional evidence shows it is incorrect.) However, a 1329 stone inscription says Yazathingyan in fact succeeded the throne as Athinkhaya II after Athinkhaya's death, and that Thihathu succeeded afterwards. (Note: According to a 1329 stone inscription found at Lunbogon, Kyaukse by J.A. Stewart, Yazathingyan succeeded the [Myinsaing] throne as Athinkhaya Nge (Athinkhaya the Younger).) At any rate, Thihathu proclaimed himself as the successor of the Pagan dynasty, as he founded Pinya Kingdom on 7 February 1313.

== Bibliography ==
- Aung-Thwin, Michael A. (November 1996). "The Myth of the "Three Shan Brothers" and the Ava Period in Burmese History". The Journal of Asian Studies. 55 (4). Cambridge: Cambridge University Press: 881–901. doi:10.2307/2646527. JSTOR 2646527.
- Aung-Thwin, Michael Arthur; Hall, Kenneth R. (2011). New Perspectives on the History and Historiography of Southeast Asia. Routledge. ISBN 9781136819643.
- Aung-Thwin, Michael A. (2017). Myanmar in the Fifteenth Century. Honolulu: University of Hawai'i Press. ISBN 978-0-8248-6783-6.
- Coedès, George (1968). Walter F. Vella (ed.). The Indianized States of Southeast Asia. trans.Susan Brown Cowing. University of Hawaii Press. ISBN 978-0-8248-0368-1.
- Duroiselle, Charles (1920). Report of the Superintendent, Archaeological Survey of Burma for the Year Ending 31st March 1920. Rangoon: Office of the Superintendent, Government Printing, Burma.
- Harvey, G. E. (1925). History of Burma: From the Earliest Times to 10 March 1824. London: Frank Cass & Co. Ltd.
- Htin Aung, Maung (1967). A History of Burma. New York and London: Cambridge University Press.
- Maha Sithu (2012) [1798]. Kyaw Win; Thein Hlaing (eds.). Yazawin Thit (in Burmese). Vol. 1–3 (2nd printing ed.). Yangon: Ya-Pyei Publishing.
- Phayre, Lt. Gen. Sir Arthur P. (1967) [1883]. History of Burma. London: Susil Gupta.
- Royal Historical Commission of Burma (2003) [1832]. Hmannan Yazawin (in Burmese). Vol. 1–3. Yangon: Ministry of Information, Myanmar.
- Than Tun (December 1959). "History of Burma: A.D. 1300–1400". Journal of Burma Research Society. XLII (II).
- Than Tun (1964). Studies in Burmese History (in Burmese). Vol. 1. Yangon: Maha Dagon.

Yazathingyan Myinsaing Dynasty Born: c. 1263 Died: 1312/13
Regnal titles
New title	Co-Regent of Myinsaing; 17 December 1297 – 1312/13	Succeeded by Thihathu as King of Myinsaing–Pinya
Royal titles
New title	Viceroy of Mekkhaya; 19 February 1293 – 17 December 1297	Unknown
