= Atula Dewi of Prome =

Atula Dewi အတုလ ဒေဝီ

Princess consort of Prome
- Reign: c. 1280–1288
- Predecessor: new office
- Born: 1266; Myinsaing
- Died: Unknown
- Spouse: Thihathu of Prome
- Issue: Shin Myat Hla
- Father: Theinkha Bo
- Mother: Lady Myinsaing
- Religion: Theravada Buddhism

Atula Dewi (Burmese: အတုလ ဒေဝီ, pronounced [ʔətṵla̰ dèwì]) was the chief queen consort of Thihathu of Prome in the 1280s during the last days of the Pagan Empire. She was the only sister of kings Athinkhaya, Yazathingyan and Thihathu, the founders of the Myinsaing Kingdom. Her personal name was Min Hla Myat, and her daughter's name was Shin Myat Hla.

Her husband Thihathu, Viceroy of Prome, is known in Burmese history for assassinating his father King Narathihapate of Pagan, and attempting to take over the Pagan throne. The assassination succeeded but Thihathu died shortly after, and never became king. But the Pagan line lived on. Their grandson Swa Saw Ke later became king of Ava in 1367.

== Bibliography ==
- Kala, U (2006) [1724]. Maha Yazawin (in Burmese). Vol. 1–3 (4th printing ed.). Yangon: Ya-Pyei Publishing.
- Royal Historical Commission of Burma (2003) [1832]. Hmannan Yazawin (in Burmese). Vol. 1–3. Yangon: Ministry of Information, Myanmar.

Atula Dewi of Prome Pagan Dynasty Born: c. 1266
Royal titles
Preceded by new office	Princess consort of Prome c. 1280–1288	Succeeded by
