= Theinkha Bo =

Theinkha Bo သိင်္ခဗိုလ်

Prince of Binnaka
- Reign: 1240s–1260
- Born: c. 1240s Binnaka
- Died: ? Myinsaing?
- Spouse: Lady Myinsaing
- Issue: Athinkhaya, Yazathingyan, Thihathu, Atula Dewi
- Father: Binnaka Sawbwa
- Mother: ?
- Religion: Theravada Buddhism

Theinkha Bo (Burmese: သိင်္ခဗိုလ်, pronounced [θèiɴkʰa̰ bò]) was the father of kings Athinkhaya, Yazathingyan and Thihathu of Myinsaing, the dynasty that replaced the Pagan Dynasty in 1297. His descendants founded the kingdoms that succeeded Pagan: Myinsaing, Pinya, Sagaing and Ava.

According to the Burmese chronicles, Theinkha Bo was born in Binnaka to the sawbwa (saopha) (chief) of the town. Some time after his elder brother succeeded the chieftainship, he and his brother quarreled, forcing Theinkha Bo to leave town. He eventually settled at Myinsaing, a small town located in present-day Kyaukse District, and married a woman from a wealthy family there in 1260. The couple had four children. His three sons served in the Pagan army, and became commanders that King Narathihapate relied on. His youngest child married a son of the king.

Although the chronicles do not mention his ethnicity, British colonial era historians assumed that he was of Shan ethnicity based on the fact that his father was a sawbwa. (Note: See (Phayre 1967: 57) and (Harvey 1925: 75–76).) The historian Michael Aung-Thwin has argued however that it is a mistake to equate the office with ethnicity, and that colonial scholarship grafted on Shan ethnicity to the so-called Shan brothers without any evidence. (Note: See (Aung-Thwin 1996) and (Aung-Thwin and Aung-Thwin 2012: 107–109).)

== Bibliography ==
- Aung-Thwin, Michael A. (November 1996). "The Myth of the "Three Shan Brothers" and the Ava Period in Burmese History". The Journal of Asian Studies. 55 (4): 881–901. doi:10.2307/2646527. JSTOR 2646527.
- Aung-Thwin, Michael A.; Maitrii Aung-Thwin (2012). A History of Myanmar Since Ancient Times (illustrated ed.). Honolulu: University of Hawai'i Press. ISBN 978-1-86189-901-9.
- Kala, U (1724). Maha Yazawin (in Burmese). Vol. 1–3 (2006, 4th printing ed.). Yangon: Ya-Pyei Publishing.
- Harvey, G. E. (1925). History of Burma: From the Earliest Times to 10 March 1824. London: Frank Cass & Co. Ltd.
- Phayre, Lt. Gen. Sir Arthur P. (1883). History of Burma (1967 ed.). London: Susil Gupta.
