= Pinle =

Pinle ပင်လယ်
- Location in Myanmar
- Coordinates: 21°18′30.83″N 96°12′37.73″E
- Country: Myanmar
- Region: Mandalay
- District: Kyaukse District
- Township: Myittha Township
- Time zone: UTC+6.30 (MMT)

Pinle (Burmese: ပင်လယ်) is an archaeological excavation site, located in Myittha Township, Mandalay Region, Myanmar. Pinle was a capital of the Myinsaing Kingdom from 1297 to 1313. Pinle today is a village on the edge of the walled Pyu complex which is known as Maingmaw.

== List of rulers of Pinle ==
=== Ava period ===
Name	Term From	Term Until	Relationship to predecessor(s)	Overlord(s)	Notes
...
Thihathu	19 February 1293	7 February 1313	Appointed	Kyawswa of Pagan; Saw Hnit of Pagan	Co-Regent of Pagan (1297–1310) alongside Athinkhaya and Yazathingyan
Kyawswa I of Pinya	7 February 1313	29 March 1344	Son	Thihathu of Pinya; Uzana I of Pinya	
Nawrahta	c. 29 March 1344	c. April 1349	Brother	Kyawswa I of Pinya	
Min Letwe	c. 1349	1386	Nephew	Kyawswa I of Pinya; Kyawswa II of Pinya; Narathu of Pinya; Uzana II of Pinya; Thado Minbya of Ava; Swa Saw Ke of Ava	
Thray Thinkhaya	1386	late 1427	Appointed	Swa Saw Ke; Tarabya; Minkhaung I; Thihathu of Ava; Min Hla; Kale Kye-Taung Nyo; Mohnyin Thado	
Minye Kyawhtin	early 1428	c. December 1445	Seized by force	n/a	Independent; Pretender to the Ava throne
...
Uzana	1460/61 (Note: 822 ME (1460/61))	?	Appointed	Narapati I of Ava	Brother-in-law of Narapati I; Commander of the Southern Cavalry

=== Toungoo period ===
Name	Term From	Term Until	Relationship to predecessor(s)	Overlord(s)	Notes
...

=== Konbaung period ===
The following is a list of feudal lords who held Pinle as their fief. These lords did not have the day-to-day administrative duties, which were handled by a myothugyi or myowun (mayor).

Name	Term From	Term Until	Relationship to predecessor(s)	Overlord(s)	Notes
...
Bagyidaw	?	1819	Appointed	Bodawpaya	Lord of the 16 fiefs and Commander of the Southern Cavalry and the Northern Cavalry (Note: The 16 fiefs and the two cavalry regiments include: Sagaing, Ava (Inwa), Yadana Theinga (Shwebo), Myedu, Pyinsala, Nga Singu, Myinsaing, Pinle, Pyinsi, Kyauksauk, Taungdwingyi, Shwegyin; Commander of Southern Cavalry and Northern Cavalry)
...

== Bibliography ==
- Kala, U (2006) [1724]. Maha Yazawin (in Burmese). Vol. 1–3 (4th printing ed.). Yangon: Ya-Pyei Publishing.
- Maha Sithu (2012) [1798]. Myint Swe; Kyaw Win; Thein Hlaing (eds.). Yazawin Thit (in Burmese). Vol. 1–3 (2nd printing ed.). Yangon: Ya-Pyei Publishing.
- Maung Maung Tin, U (2004) [1905]. Konbaung Set Maha Yazawin (in Burmese). Vol. 1–3. Yangon: Department of Universities History Research, University of Yangon.
- Royal Historical Commission of Burma (2003) [1832]. Hmannan Yazawin (in Burmese). Vol. 1–3. Yangon: Ministry of Information, Myanmar.
