= Thihathu =

King of Myinsaing–Pinya (1265–1325)

Thihathu; သီဟသူ

King of Myinsaing–Pinya
- Reign: 7 February 1313 – February 1325
- Coronation: 7 February 1313
- Predecessor: new office
- Successor: Uzana I (as King of Pinya); Saw Yun (as King of Sagaing)

Co-Regent of Myinsaing
- Reign: 17 December 1297 – 7 February 1313
- Coronation: 20 October 1309
- Predecessor: new office
- Successor: himself (as King of Myinsaing–Pinya)

Viceroy of Pinle
- Reign: 19 February 1293 – 17 December 1297
- Predecessor: new office
- Successor: Kyawswa I (as Governor)
- Born: 1265; Monday, 627 ME; Myinsaing
- Died: c. February 1325 (aged 59); 686 ME; Pinya
- Consort: Mi Saw U; Yadanabon
- Issue: Uzana I (stepson; adopted); Tarabya I (stepson); Saw Yun; Kyawswa I; Nawrahta; Saw Pale
- House: Myinsaing
- Father: Theinkha Bo
- Mother: Lady Myinsaing
- Religion: Theravada Buddhism

Thihathu (Burmese: သီဟသူ, pronounced [θìha̰ðù]; 1265–1325) was a co-founder of the Myinsaing Kingdom, and the founder of the Pinya Kingdom in today's central Burma (Myanmar). Thihathu was the youngest and most ambitious of the three brothers that successfully defended central Burma from Mongol invasions in 1287 and in 1300–01. He and his brothers toppled the regime at Pagan in 1297, and co-ruled central Burma. After his eldest brother Athinkhaya's death in 1310, Thihathu pushed aside the middle brother Yazathingyan, and took over as the sole ruler of central Burma. His decision to designate his adopted son Uzana I heir-apparent caused his eldest biological son, Saw Yun to set up a rival power center in Sagaing in 1315. Although Saw Yun nominally remained loyal to his father, after Thihathu's death in 1325, the two houses of Myinsaing officially became rival kingdoms in central Burma.

== Early life ==
Thihathu was born in 1265 to a prominent family in Myinsaing in Central Burma. His father Theinkha Bo was a younger brother of the sawbwa (chief) of Binnaka, and had fled to Myinsaing after a dispute with his brother in 1260. Traditional (British colonial era) scholarship identifies his father as an ethnic Shan. But the historian Michael Aung-Thwin has rejected the assertion, given that no historical evidence any kind exists to support the claim. (Note: (Aung-Thwin 1996: 884–885): Arthur Phayre was the first one to make the assertion, based purely on the chronicles' use of sawbwa, equating the office with ethnicity. GE Harvey (Harvey 1925: 76) inserted the word "Shan", in what he claimed was the direct quote from Hmannan, which says no such thing. In all, no historical evidence of any kind (in Burmese, Shan or anything else) that indicates the ethnicity of their father or the three brothers exists.) At any rate, Theinkha Bo married a daughter of a wealthy banker at Myinsaing. (Note: (Maha Yazawin Vol. 1 2006: 254): His mother was from a wealthy but commoner athi (အသည်) family. (Aung-Thwin 1996: 884): The athi were a class of people not attached to the crown or the sangha.) Thihathu was the third child of the couple's four children. He had two elder brothers (Athinkhaya and Yazathingyan) and a younger sister Hla Myat. (Note: Chronicles Zatadawbon Yazawin (Zata 1960: 42) and Maha Yazawin (Maha Yazawin Vol. 1 2006: 258–259) both say that Yazathingyan was the eldest, followed by Athinkhaya, Thihathu and their sister. But Yazawin Thit (Yazawin Thit Vol. 1 2012: 156–157) corrects it based on a contemporary inscription. Subsequent chronicles (Hmannan, Dutiya Hmannan) and scholarship accept Athinkhaya as the eldest.)

== Royal service ==
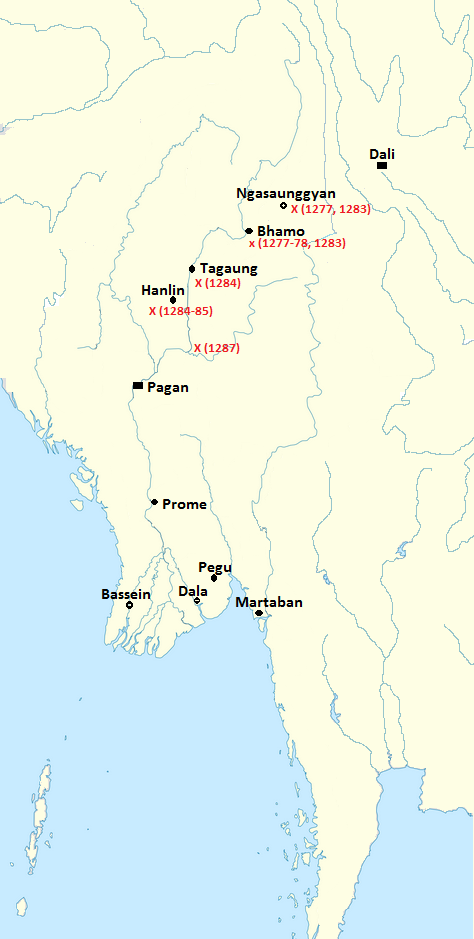
Mongol invasions (1277–87)

Thihathu entered the royal service of King Narathihapate, following the footsteps of his elder brothers Athinkhaya and Yazathingyan. His eldest brother, Athinkhaya, had already distinguished himself, and married Princess Saw U, a niece of the king and a granddaughter of King Uzana and Queen Thonlula. His sister Hla Myat was married to Prince Thihathu, Viceroy of Prome.

The three brothers distinguished themselves in the first war with the Mongols. In 1285, the three brothers, still in their twenties, came to lead the defense of Central Burma. The army had been defeated in northern Burma by the Mongols in the previous dry-seasons (1283–85). Over the next two years, they manned the front (north of present-day Mandalay) while the king and his court relocated to Lower Burma. It was probably during this period that the brothers were given the official titles of Athinkhaya, Yazathingyan and Thihathu by which they would be known in history. (Note: (Than Tun 1959: 121): The three brothers are mentioned in an inscription dated 13 February 1289 as Athinkhaya, Yazathingyan and Thihathura. Since Kyawswa would not become king until 30 May 1289, they must have been awarded the titles by Narathihapate.) They made their name in 1287 when the Mongols invaded Central Burma once again. The invasion was in response to the July 1287 assassination of Narathihapate, who became a Mongol vassal six months earlier. The Burmese army led by the brothers successfully stopped the Mongols, who after taking heavy casualties retreated to their base in Tagaung.

== Rise to power in Central Burma ==
=== Viceroy of Pinle ===
The country fell into anarchy. The Mongols at Tagaung decided not to get involved, leaving the power vacuum unfilled. In Central Burma, the brothers officially took over the leadership of the army, and consolidated their hold of the Kyaukese region, the main granary of the Pagan Kingdom. One of Narathihapate's sons Kyawswa eventually emerged king at Pagan on 30 May 1289 but Kyawswa did not control much beyond the capital. The real power in Central Burma now belonged to the brothers. On 19 February 1293, Kyawswa tried to buy their loyalty by appointing them viceroys of Kyuakse: Athinkhaya as viceroy of Myinsaing, Yazathingyan as viceroy of Mekkhaya and Thihathu as viceroy of Pinle. The territories they were given to govern were small but the king himself ruled a small region around the capital. The brothers took the title of viceroy but did not think much of the "king". Their commemorative inscription of their appointment as viceroy actually states that they were equal to the king, and reminds that it was them who defeated the Mongols in 1287. When Martaban (Mottama) in Lower Burma, which had officially declared independence from Pagan since 1287, became a vassal of Sukhothai in 1293, it was the brothers who marched to retake the former Pagan territory in 1295–1296 (also reported as 1293–1294). (Note: The chronicle Razadarit Ayedawbon (Pan Hla 2005: 30–35) includes two seemingly separate invasions by Pagan—the first around or after 654 ME (1292/93), and the second in 655 ME (1293/94). But the narratives are disjointed, and may refer to the same event. The first narrative says the c. 1292/93 invasion took place during the reign of King Narathihapate, which cannot be true since the king had been dead since 1287. The second narrative says the king of Ngawdaw [identified as districts near Pinle, the fief of Thihathu by (Harvey 1925: 111, footnote 2)] invaded in 1293/94. Furthermore, the standard chronicles do not mention any campaigns to the south during Kyawswa's reign. But the Yazawin Thit chronicle (Yazawin Thit Vol. 1 2012: 150) does mention one campaign to Dala in 658 ME (28 March 1296 to 28 March 1297). (SMK Vol. 3 1983: 196, lines 1, 18–19): A contemporary inscription dated 14th waxing of Thantu (Thadingyut) 658 ME (12 September 1296) states that King Kyawswa gave rewards to Gen. Ananda Zeya Pakyan for having captured Dala in 658 ME (1296/97). Since the inscription was inscribed on 12 September 1296, during the rainy season, the capture of Dala most probably took place earlier in the year 658 ME (28 March 1296 to May 1296) before the rainy season began. The colonial period scholarship (Harvey 1925: 111) and (Htin Aung 1967: 79) say Pagan was driven back in 1293–1294. But (Aung-Thwin 2017: 25) accepts the inscription's 1296 date.) Although they were driven back, it left no doubt as to who held the real power in Central Burma.

=== Overthrow of Kyawswa ===
In the following years, the brothers continued to consolidate power in Central Burma. Thihathu was the most ambitious and least diplomatic, proclaiming himself hsinbyushin (ဆင်ဖြူရှင်, "Lord of the White Elephant") in 1295 and mingyi (မင်းကြီး, "Great Lord") in 1296. (Note: (SMK Vol. 3 1983: 176–177): The inscription dated 657 ME (1295/96; exact date no longer visible) at the Ma-man monastery at Mon-Paung village in Kyaukse calls him ဆင်ဖြူရှင် (Hsinbyushin). (SMK Vol. 3 1983: 179): The inscription dated 7th waning of Nadaw 658 ME (18 November 1296) at a monastery in Myinsaing refers Thihathu as မင်းကြီး (Mingyi).) Though Athinkhaya and Yazathingyan may have tolerated Thihathu's declarations, Kyawswa felt threatened by them. In January 1297, Kyawswa asked for the protection of the Mongols, and was recognized by the Mongol emperor Temür Khan as King of Pagan on 20 March 1297. The emperor also gave Chinese titles to the brothers as subordinates of Kyawswa. The brothers ultimately decided to overthrow Kyawswa and face the Mongols. On 17 December 1297, with the help of the dowager queen Pwa Saw, they overthrew Kyawswa, and installed one of Kyawswa's sons, Saw Hnit as their puppet king. The brothers now ruled Central Burma as co-regents from their respective capitals of Myinsaing, Mekkhaya and Pinle.

== Co-regency ==
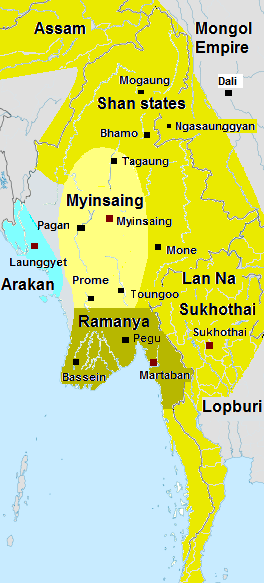
Myinsaing Kingdom c. 1310

=== Second Mongol invasion ===
After the overthrow, the brothers braced for a reprisal by the Mongols. But the expected reprisal never came. They became bolder, and allowed Saw Hnit to give his first audience on 8 May 1299. Two days later, they executed Kyawswa and his eldest son Theingapati. Another son of Kyawswa, Kumara Kassapa, escaped to Yunnan in September 1299 to seek the help of the Mongols. In January 1300, the brothers forced the issue by attacking and occupying southernmost Mongol garrisons at Singu and Male. The Mongol government at Yunnan could not respond until a year later, sending a 12,000-strong army. The brothers chose to face the Mongols in Central Burma at their heavily fortified city of Myinsaing. The Mongol army began the siege of Myinsaing on 25 January 1301, and launched a major attack on the fort on 28 February 1301. The attack failed. On 12 March 1301, Athinkhaya, with the support of Yazathingyan and Thihathu, made an offer to the Mongol command, to give them a bribe in exchange for their withdrawal. The Mongol command agreed. On 6 April 1301, upon receiving a bribe of 800 taels (30 kg) of gold and 2200 taels (83 kg) of silver, the Mongol army began their withdrawal. The Yunnan government did not agree with the withdrawal; the two senior Mongol commanders were executed for abandoning the original mission. Nonetheless, the Mongols did not send another expedition, and withdrew altogether from northern Burma two years later.

=== Post-invasion ===
The Mongols left northern Burma to their nominal vassals, the Shan states. The brothers were able to extend their influence as far north as Tagaung but no further. The brothers' joint-rule survived despite Thihathu's ambitions. Thihathu, the youngest brother, assumed the royal title of Ananda Thiha Thura Zeya Dewa in 1306, and proclaimed himself king on 20 October 1309. It is not known what Athinkhaya and Yazathingyan made of the proclamations. At any rate, Athinkhaya died on 13 April 1310, leaving the two younger brothers Yazathingyan and Thihathu. Yazathingyan passed to the background and died in 1312 or 1313. (Note: The main chronicles before Hmannan all say Yazathingyan died in 674 ME (1312/13): see (Zata 1960: 43), (Maha Yazawin Vol. 1 2006: 259) and (Yazawin Thit Vol. 1 2012: 156–157). Hmannan (Hmannan Vol. 1 2003: 369) in contradiction to the prior chronicles says Yazathingyan died in 665 ME (1303/04) but inscriptional evidence shows it is incorrect.) Thihathu proclaimed himself as the successor of the Pagan dynasty, as he founded Pinya Kingdom on 7 February 1313.

== Pinya ==
=== Foundation of Pinya ===
In 1313, Thihathu moved his capital from Pinle to Pinya. He had begun scouting for a new location ever since he proclaimed himself king in October 1309. After Athinkhaya's death, he decided on the location of what later would become Ava (Inwa), strategically located at the estuary of the Irrawaddy and Myitnge rivers. But he later decided against the location due to what he considered bad omens at the site. He agreed to an inland location, a few miles east of Ava. (He probably decided against returning to Pagan because he wanted to be closer to the Kyaukse region, the upcountry's primary rice basket. Moreover, the Minbu region, one of the three main agricultural regions, was becoming infertile due to weather changes.) Thihathu officially opened the city, officially named Wizayapura (ဝိဇယပူရ, Pali: Vijayapura), on 7 February 1313. (Note: (Hmannan Vol. 1 2003: 370) gives Wednesday, 15th waxing of Tabaung 674 ME, which translates to 10 February 1313. But 15th waxing is most probably a copying error since it is highly uncommon to say 15th waxing instead of full moon. The date was probably 12th waxing of Tabaung, which correctly translates to Wednesday, 7 February 1313. Burmese numerals ၂ (2) and ၅ (5) are similar and can easily be miscopied.)

On the same day, Thihathu held a coronation ceremony, proclaiming himself as the rightful successor of Pagan kings. His reign name was Thiri Tri Bawana Ditaya Pawara Thiha Thura Dhamma Yaza. So eager was he to establish his Pagan credentials that he uncharacteristically begged the dowager queen Pwa Saw twice to attend his coronation ceremony. At the coronation ceremony, Queen Pwa Saw presented Thihathu the golden belt and the golden tray which had been handed down in the royal family since the time of King Anawrahta (r. 1044–1077). Thihathu now officially considered himself the heir to Pagan kings. His chief queen was Mi Saw U, a daughter of Narathihapate. More importantly, he appointed his adopted son Uzana, the biological son of the fallen king Kyawswa and Mi Saw U, as the heir apparent. He also appointed Kyawswa, his first son by Mi Saw U, governor of Pinle.

=== Secession of Sagaing ===
The appointments did not go down well with Saw Yun, his eldest biological son by a commoner queen (Yadanabon). Saw Yun felt the throne was his. He agitated his father for a viceroyship in the north. While Thihathu wavered, on 16 May 1315, Saw Yun took matters in his own hand, and left for Sagaing with a group of followers, a few miles west of Pinya, across the Irrawaddy. Saw Yun found support in a sect of forest dwelling monks and their followers.

At first, Thihathu dismissed the 16-year-old's thinly veiled insurrection, and did not take any action. But Saw Yun continued to consolidate his support in the north, and fortified Sagaing with a brick wall, completed on 26 March 1316. Even then, Thihathu's response was halfhearted. He sent two small expeditions, each led by Uzana and Kyawswa respectively, to retake the city. Both attempts failed. Thihathu, who never liked rivalry even among his own brothers, now decided to leave his eldest biological son alone. Saw Yun's position may also have been helped by an open rebellion in Toungoo (Taungoo) in 1317–18, and subsequent instabilities in Taungdwin. Thihathu got both Toungoo and Taungdwin under control but essentially ceded control of northern Upper Burma to Saw Yun. For his part, Saw Yun never formally renounced his allegiance to his father. Thihathu had to be satisfied with the arrangement although he must have known that Pinya and Sagaing would become bitter rivals after his death.

== Last years ==
According to the chronicles, Thihathu spent his last years, devoted to religion. His primate was Shin Deibba Sekkhu. He donated Anawrahta's heirlooms to the relic chamber of the Shwezigon Pagoda. The king died c. February 1325; he was 59. He was succeeded by Uzana. After his death, the two houses of Myinsaing officially became separate kingdoms, vying for supremacy in central Burma for the next four decades.

The king is remembered in Burmese history as Tazishin (တစ်စီးရှင်, "Lord of One White Elephant").

== Chronicle reporting differences ==
Note that the chronicles do not agree on his birth and death dates, or reign dates.

| Source | Birth–Death | Age | Co-Regent | King | Reference |
|---|---|---|---|---|---|
| Zatadawbon Yazawin | c. 1254 – early 1323 | 68 (69th year) | 1300–1309 | 1309–1323 | (Note: (Zata 1960: 42–43) counts start of reign from the date his proclamation as king in 1309.) |
| Maha Yazawin | c. 1268 – early 1323 | 54 (55th year) | 1300–1313 | 1313–1323 | |
| Yazawin Thit | c. 1260 – early 1320 | 59 (60th year) | 1297–1313 | 1313–1320 | |
| Hmannan Yazawin | c. 1263 – early 1323 | 59 (60th year) | 1298–1313 | 1313–1323 | |
| Scholarship | c. 1265 – c. February 1325 | 59 (60th year) | 17 December 1297 – 7 February 1313 | 7 February 1313 – c. February 1325 | (Note: See the regnal list by the editors of (Maha Yazawin Vol. 1 2006: 350).) |

== Family ==
Thihathu had three sons and one daughter as well as two stepsons by two principal queens, Mi Saw U and Yadanabon.

| Name | Mother | Notes |
|---|---|---|
| Uzana | Mi Saw U | King of Pinya (r. 1325–40) stepson but adopted as own |
| Kyawswa | Mi Saw U | King of Pinya (r. 1344–50) |
| Nawrahta | Mi Saw U | Governor of Kanni (r. 1349–64); Governor of Pinle (r. 1344–49); Governor of Shisha (1313–44) |
| Saw Yun | Yadanabon | King of Sagaing (r. 1315–27) |
| Saw Pale | Yadanabon | Duchess of Taungdwin |
| Tarabya | Yadanabon | King of Sagaing (r. 1327–35) stepson |

== Bibliography ==
- Aung-Thwin, Michael A. (November 1996). "The Myth of the "Three Shan Brothers" and the Ava Period in Burmese History". The Journal of Asian Studies. 55 (4). Cambridge: Cambridge University Press: 881–901. doi:10.2307/2646527. JSTOR 2646527.
- Aung-Thwin, Michael Arthur; Hall, Kenneth R. (2011). New Perspectives on the History and Historiography of Southeast Asia. Routledge. ISBN 9781136819643.
- Aung-Thwin, Michael A. (2017). Myanmar in the Fifteenth Century. Honolulu: University of Hawai'i Press. ISBN 978-0-8248-6783-6.
- Coedès, George (1968). Walter F. Vella (ed.). The Indianized States of Southeast Asia. trans.Susan Brown Cowing. University of Hawaii Press. ISBN 978-0-8248-0368-1.
- Harvey, G. E. (1925). History of Burma: From the Earliest Times to 10 March 1824. London: Frank Cass & Co. Ltd.
- Htin Aung, Maung (1967). A History of Burma. New York and London: Cambridge University Press.
- Kala, U (2006) [1724]. Maha Yazawin (in Burmese). Vol. 1–3 (4th printing ed.). Yangon: Ya-Pyei Publishing.
- Maha Sithu (2012) [1798]. Kyaw Win; Thein Hlaing (eds.). Yazawin Thit (in Burmese). Vol. 1–3 (2nd ed.). Yangon: Ya-Pyei Publishing.
- Nyein Maung, ed. (1972–1998). Shay-haung Myanma Kyauksa-mya [Ancient Burmese Stone Inscriptions] (in Burmese). Vol. 1–5. Yangon: Archaeological Department.
- Phayre, Lt. Gen. Sir Arthur P. (1967) [1883]. History of Burma. London: Susil Gupta.
- Royal Historians of Burma (1960) [c. 1680]. U Hla Tin (Hla Thamein) (ed.). Zatadawbon Yazawin. Historical Research Directorate of the Union of Burma.
- Royal Historical Commission of Burma (2003) [1832]. Hmannan Yazawin (in Burmese). Vol. 1–3. Yangon: Ministry of Information, Myanmar.
- Than Tun (December 1959). "History of Burma: A.D. 1300–1400". Journal of Burma Research Society. XLII (II).
- Than Tun (1964). Studies in Burmese History (in Burmese). Vol. 1. Yangon: Maha Dagon.

Thihathu Myinsaing Dynasty Born: 1265 Died: c. February 1325
Regnal titles
| Preceded by new office | King of Myinsaing–Pinya; 7 February 1313 – c. February 1325 | Succeeded by Uzana I (as King of Pinya); Saw Yun (as King of Sagaing) |
| Preceded by new office | Co-Regent of Myinsaing; 17 December 1297 – 7 February 1313 | Succeeded by himself as King of Myinsaing–Pinya |
Royal titles
| Preceded by new office | Viceroy of Pinle; 19 February 1293 – 17 December 1297 | Succeeded by Kyawswa I |
