= Myinsaing Kingdom =

Kingdom that ruled central Burma (Myanmar) from 1297 to 1313

Myinsaing Kingdom မြင်စိုင်းခေတ်
- 1297–1313
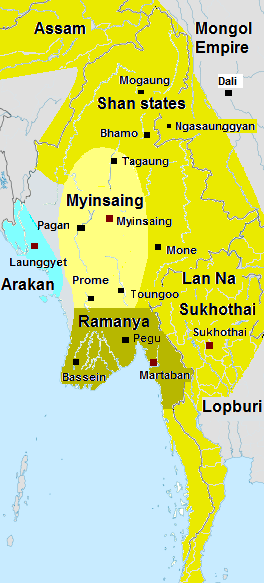
- Myinsaing realm c. 1310
- Status: Regency
- Capital: Myinsaing, Mekkhaya, Pinle
- Common languages: Burmese, Shan, Mon
- Religion: Theravada Buddhism, Mahayana Buddhism, animism
- Government: Monarchy
  - 1297–1310: Athinkhaya, Yazathingyan, Thihathu
  - 1310–1312/13: Yazathingyan, Thihathu
  - 1313: Thihathu
- Historical era: Warring states
  - First Mongol invasions: 1277–87
  - Myinsaing takeover: 17 December 1297
  - Puppet king placed on throne: 8 May 1299
  - Last Mongol invasion: 1300–01
  - Mongol evacuation: 4 April 1303
  - Thihathu's proclamation as king: 20 October 1309
  - Pinya founded: 7 February 1313
  - Sagaing secession: 15 May 1315
Preceded by	Succeeded by
Pagan Kingdom	Pinya Kingdom

The Myinsaing Kingdom (Burmese: မြင်စိုင်းခေတ် [mjɪ̀ɰ̃záɪɰ̃ kʰɪʔ]) was the kingdom that ruled central Burma (Myanmar) from 1297 to 1313. It was founded by three brothers—Athinkhaya, Yazathingyan and Thihathu from Myinsaing— and was one of many small kingdoms that emerged following the collapse of the Pagan Empire in 1287. Myinsaing successfully fended off the second Mongol invasion in 1300–1301, and went on to unify central Burma from Tagaung in the north to Prome (Pyay) in the south. The brothers' co-rule ended between 1310 and 1313, with the death of the two elder brothers Athinkhaya and Yazathingyan. In 1315, the central Burmese state split into two rival states of Pinya and Sagaing. Central Burma would not be reunified until the rise of Ava five decades later.

== History ==
=== First Mongol invasions (1277–1287) ===
The origins of the Myinsaing period can be traced back to the late Pagan period. By the 1270s, the Pagan Dynasty, which had ruled the Irrawaddy valley and its periphery for over two centuries, was on its last legs. Between one and two-thirds of Upper Burma's cultivatable land had been donated to religion, and the crown had lost resources needed to retain the loyalty of courtiers and military servicemen. The beginning of the end of Pagan came in 1277 when the Mongol Empire first invaded northernmost Pagan territories (present-day Dehong and Baoshan prefectures, Yunnan). The Mongols proceeded to invade northern Burma in 1283–85, occupying down to Tagaung. King Narathihapate fled to Lower Burma. In the next two years, while the king negotiated a ceasefire and eventually a surrender with the Mongols, the defence of central Burma passed to the army led by three brothers named Athinkhaya, Yazathingyan and Thihathu from Myinsaing.

=== Postwar rise (1287–1297) ===
On 1 July 1287, the newly minted Mongol vassal Narathihapate was assassinated by one of his sons. All the regions in the country, which had not already revolted, broke away. The Mongols invaded central Burma to reinstate their vassal state but were driven back by the brothers' small but disciplined army. Without a king on the Pagan throne, the brothers were now the de facto leaders of central Burma. It was only in May 1289 that one of Narathihapate's sons, Kyawswa, emerged as king. But Kyawswa, the former viceroy of Dala (modern Yangon), had no power base in the upcountry, and controlled little outside of Pagan. (Note: (Than Tun 1959: 121): Kyawswa at most might have controlled six districts of the Minbu granary region, which was of less importance than the Kyaukse granary under control by the three brothers.)

King Kyawswa tried to make the best of the situation. To win their loyalty, the king appointed Athinkhaya, Yazathingyan and Thihathu viceroys of Myinsaing, Mekkhaya and Pinle, respectively. The appointments made little impression. According to an inscription dated 19 February 1293, the brothers claimed that they were the ones who defeated the Mongol invaders, and that they were equal to the king of Pagan. Nonetheless, they agreed to march to Lower Burma when King Wareru of Martaban (Mottama) became a vassal of Sukhothai. Their army attacked Martaban in 1295–1296 (also reported as 1293–1294) (Note: The chronicle Razadarit Ayedawbon (Pan Hla 2005: 30–35) includes two seemingly separate invasions by Pagan—the first around or after 654 ME (1292/93), and the second in 655 ME (1293/94). But the narratives are disjointed, and may refer to the same event. The first narrative says the c. 1292/93 invasion took place during the reign of King Narathihapate, which cannot be true since the king had been dead since 1287. The second narrative says the king of Ngawdaw [identified as districts near Pinle, the fief of Thihathu by (Harvey 1925: 111, footnote 2)] invaded in 1293/94. Furthermore, the standard chronicles do not mention any campaigns to the south during Kyawswa's reign. But the Yazawin Thit chronicle (Yazawin Thit Vol. 1 2012: 150) does mention one campaign to Dala in 658 ME (28 March 1296 to 28 March 1297). (SMK Vol. 3 1983: 196, lines 1, 18–19): A contemporary inscription dated 14th waxing of Thantu (Thadingyut) 658 ME (12 September 1296) states that King Kyawswa gave rewards to Gen. Ananda Zeya Pakyan for having captured Dala in 658 ME (1296/97). Since the inscription was inscribed on 12 September 1296, during the rainy season, the capture of Dala most probably took place earlier in the year 658 ME (28 March 1296 to May 1296) before the rainy season began. The colonial period scholarship (Harvey 1925: 111) and (Htin Aung 1967: 79) say Pagan was driven back in 1293–1294. But (Aung-Thwin 2017: 25) accepts the inscription's 1296 date.) but were driven back. Still, it left no doubt as to who held the real power in central Burma.

=== Takeover (1297) ===
The brothers further consolidated power in the following years. The youngest brother, Thihathu, was the most ambitious and blatant. He was not satisfied with a mere viceroy title; he assumed the royal titles of hsinbyushin (ဆင်ဖြူရှင်, "Lord of the White Elephant") in 1295 and mingyi (မင်းကြီး, "Great King") in 1296. Alarmed, Kyawswa finally decided to seek protection of the Mongols. In January 1297, he sent his eldest son Theingapati to Tagaung, and offered submission. On 20 March 1297, Emperor Temür Khan recognised Kyawswa as King of Burma, and conferred titles on the brothers as Kyawswa's subordinates. The brothers resented the new arrangement, and eventually decided to risk a Mongol intervention. With the help of the dowager queen Pwa Saw, they overthrew Kyawswa on 17 December 1297.

=== Second Mongol invasion (1300–1301) ===
The Myinsaing Kingdom and contemporary Asian polities circa 1300.

The brothers now braced for a Mongol reprisal. But the expected response did not come. The Mongols learned of the overthrow only in June–July 1298 but the Yunnan government, which did not have sufficient troops to undertake an invasion, took no action. By May 1299, the brothers were reasonably confident that the invasion, if at all, would not come until the next dry-season at the earliest. They allowed their puppet king Saw Hnit to receive his first audience on 8 May 1299, and more importantly, executed Kyawswa and Theingapati on 10 May 1299. The Mongols still took no action, ignoring the execution of their vassal king and crown prince. The brothers became bolder, and decided to challenge the Mongol rule in northern Burma itself. In January 1300, the Burmese army led by Athinkhaya seized lightly manned southernmost Mongol garrisons in Singu and Male, only 70 km from Tagaung.

The Mongol government could not ignore the situation any more. On 22 June 1300, the emperor declared Kumara Kassapa, a son of Kyawswa, the rightful king of Burma, and ordered an invasion. In the following dry season, a 12,000-strong Mongol army invaded, and despite taking heavy losses managed to reach Myinsaing on 25 January 1301. But Myinsaing's defences held, and the Mongols were persuaded to call off the attack on receipt of a considerable bribe on 6 April 1301. The Mongol government was dissatisfied with the outcome but pursued no further action. They withdrew from northern Burma entirely on 4 April 1303.

=== Dry Zone power ===
Myinsaing was now the undisputed power in central Dry Zone of the country. At Pagan, Saw Hnit remained as "king" but in reality, he was now a mere governor. In the north, the brothers took over Tagaung but could not go any farther north as several Shan states now dominated the entire arc surrounding the Irrawaddy valley. In the south, they gained nominal allegiance of the rulers of Prome (Pyay) and Toungoo (Taungoo). They had no control farther south, which was now controlled by the Kingdom of Martaban.

The triumvirate's rule lasted for a few more years in spite of Thihathu's ambitions. The youngest brother, Thihathu, assumed a royal title in 1306, and proclaimed himself king on 20 October 1309. The proclamation ended the charade of Saw Hnit's nominal status as king. While it is not known what the two elder brothers (Athinkhaya and Yazathingyan) made of the proclamation, after Athinkhaya's death in 1310, Thihathu emerged as the primary leader of central Burma. Yazathingyan faded into the background, and died two years later. (Note: Chronicles Zatadawbon Yazawin, Maha Yazawin and Yazawin Thit all say Yazathingyan died in 674 ME (28 March 1312 to 28 March 1313). But Hmannan Yazawin says that he died in 1303. Hmannan is incorrect. According to a contemporary inscription, Athinkhaya died on 13 April 1310 and the two younger brothers (Yazathingyan and Thihathu) were still alive. According to a 1329 stone inscription found at Lunbogon, Kyaukse by J.A. Stewart, Yazathingyan succeeded the [Myinsaing] throne as Athinkhaya Nge (Athinkhaya the Younger).)

The undisputed reign lasted about three years. In 1315, Thihathu's eldest biological son Saw Yun set up a rival base in Sagaing. By 1317, Saw Yun had survived two attacks by his father's forces, and the central Dry Zone was again divided: the Sagaing Kingdom in the north and the Pinya Kingdom in the south.

== Government ==
The Myinsaing government was headed by the triumvirate. Although Myinsaing, Mekkhaya and Pinle were all capitals, judging by where they chose to defend against the Mongols, their hometown of Myinsaing appeared to have been the most important one. Like the Pagan government, the Myinsaing government relied on its vassal rulers for the governance of the peripheral regions. The key vassal rulers were:

State	Ruler	Title	Reign
Pagan (Bagan)	Saw Hnit	King of Pagan (Note: For most of their rule, the brothers Athinkhaya, Yazathingyan and Thihathu were officially regents of their puppet king Saw Hnit although Thihathu evidently was never enthusiastic about the word games. Thihathu, who had assumed royal titles in 1295, 1296 and 1306, finally ended the charade in 1309 by proclaiming himself king. Saw Hnit did not dispute.)	1299–1325
Prome (Pyay)	Kyaswa of Prome	Viceroy of Prome	1289–1323
Toungoo (Taungoo)	Thawun Gyi	Viceroy of Toungoo	1279–1317
Tagaung	Thado Hsinlauk	Viceroy of Tagaung	?

The political unity the brothers achieved in central Burma was fragile and did not last long in any case. The kingdom split into two in 1315. Central Burma would not be reunited until five decades later (1364–67).

== Economy ==
Myinsaing was primarily an agrarian economy. Unlike Pagan, it possessed no coastal ports, and could not conduct any maritime trade. The brothers tried to rebuild the dry zone's agrarian base. First, after the evacuation of Mongols in 1303, the brothers were able to bring all three main granaries of the country, Kyuakse, Minbu and Mu, under their rule. Secondly, they attempted to tackle the problem they inherited from Pagan kings: too much valuable land was donated to religion, and the crown could not collect revenue. They followed the tactic first used by King Kyaswa (r. 1235–51), which checked the accuracy of the donation records of the lands. To be sure, they could not solve the problem overnight. Six decades later, King Thado Minbya, a great grandson of Thihathu, would still be dealing with the issue.

== Legacy ==
Myinsaing was the first central Burmese polity that arose out of the ashes of the fallen Pagan Empire. Its main legacies were keeping middle Burma independent, and preserving Pagan's cultural traditions. Unlike elsewhere in mainland Southeast Asia, the Tai-Shan peoples and languages did not come to dominate central Burma. Athinkhaya, Yazathingyan and Thihathu, who might have been half-Shan, nonetheless saw themselves as the heirs of Pagan kings, propagated Pagan's cultural traditions, and rebuilt a state, albeit a fragile one, stretching from Tagaung in the north to Prome to the south. The fragile state would break up soon after but the Ava Kingdom, which would reunify the middle country in the 1360s, had its origins in Myinsaing.

== Historiography ==
=== Chronicle reporting differences ===
Various royal chronicles report a generally similar outline of events but a number of differences also exist. Contemporary inscriptions show that the birth order and death order of the brothers given in the Yazawin Thit chronicle are both correct while other chronicles contain errors.

Topic	Zatadawbon Yazawin (1680)	Maha Yazawin (1724)	Yazawin Thit (1798)	Hmannan Yazawin (1832)	Scholarship
Name of dynasty	Pinya	Myinsaing	Myinsaing	Myinsaing–Pinya	Myinsaing or Myinsaing–Pinya
Birth order	Yazathingyan; Athinkhaya; Thihathu	Yazathingyan; Athinkhaya; Thihathu	Athinkhaya; Yazathingyan; Thihathu	Athinkhaya; Yazathingyan; Thihathu	Athinkhaya; Yazathingyan; Thihathu
Start of dynasty	1300	1300	1298	1298	17 December 1297
War with the Mongol Empire	1304–05	1302–03 (Note: Maha Yazawin seems to have mistaken the withdrawal of the Mongols from northern Burma with their retreat from Myinsaing. (Maha Yazawin Vol. 1 2006: 258) says the Mongols laid siege to Myinsaing in 664 ME (29 March 1302 to 28 March 1303) and retreated in 665 ME (29 March 1303 to 27 March 1304). According to scholarship (Than Tun 1959: 122), the Mongols retreated from Myinsaing on 6 April 1301, and completely withdrew from northern Burma on 4 April 1303.)	1300–01	1300–01	January 1300 – 6 April 1301
Athinkhaya dies	1305/06	1305/06	1306/07	1310/11	13 April 1310
Yazathingyan dies	1312/13	1312/13	1312/13	1303/04	between 13 April 1310 and 7 February 1313

=== Colonial era scholarship ===
According to the British colonial era scholarship, this was the Age of the Three Shan Brothers (ရှမ်းညီနောင်သုံးဦးခေတ်), modifying the term used in the chronicles (မင်းညီနောင်သုံးဦးခေတ်, lit. "Age of the Three Royal Brothers"). The colonial scholarship says it was the start of the Shan period in Upper Burma that would last to the mid-16th century. The assessment of the ethnicity of the brothers as Shan was first made by the British historian Arthur Purves Phayre in the late 19th century, and his assertion was propagated by later Burma historians. Phayre deemed Theinkha Bo, the father of the brothers, an ethnic Shan since the chronicles say he was a son of sawbwa of Binnaka. But the historian Michael Aung-Thwin has rejected the assertion, given that no historical evidence of any kind exists to support the claim. (Note: (Aung-Thwin 1996: 884–885): Arthur Phayre was the first one to make the assertion, based purely on the chronicles' use of sawbwa, equating the office with ethnicity. GE Harvey (Harvey 1925: 76) inserted the word "Shan", in what he claimed was the direct quote from Hmannan, which says no such thing. In all, no historical evidence of any kind (in Burmese, Shan or anything else) that indicates the ethnicity of their father or the three brothers exists.)

== Bibliography ==
- Aung-Thwin, Michael A. (November 1996). "The Myth of the "Three Shan Brothers" and the Ava Period in Burmese History". The Journal of Asian Studies. 55 (4). Cambridge: Cambridge University Press: 881–901. doi:10.2307/2646527. JSTOR 2646527.
- Aung-Thwin, Michael A. (2017). Myanmar in the Fifteenth Century. Honolulu: University of Hawai'i Press. ISBN 978-0-8248-6783-6.
- Coedès, George (1968). Walter F. Vella (ed.). The Indianized States of Southeast Asia. trans.Susan Brown Cowing. University of Hawaii Press. ISBN 978-0-8248-0368-1.
- Duroiselle, Charles (1920). Report of the Superintendent, Archaeological Survey of Burma for the Year Ending 31st March 1920. Rangoon: Office of the Superintendent, Government Printing, Burma.
- Harvey, G. E. (1925). History of Burma: From the Earliest Times to 10 March 1824. London: Frank Cass & Co. Ltd.
- Htin Aung, Maung (1967). A History of Burma. New York and London: Cambridge University Press.
- Kala, U (2006) [1724]. Maha Yazawin (in Burmese). Vol. 1–3 (4th printing ed.). Yangon: Ya-Pyei Publishing.
- Lieberman, Victor B. (2003). Strange Parallels: Southeast Asia in Global Context, c. 800–1830, volume 1, Integration on the Mainland. Cambridge University Press. ISBN 978-0-521-80496-7.
- Maha Sithu (2012) [1798]. Kyaw Win; Thein Hlaing (eds.). Yazawin Thit (in Burmese). Vol. 1–3 (2nd printing ed.). Yangon: Ya-Pyei Publishing.
- Nyein Maung, ed. (1972–1998). Shay-haung Myanma Kyauksa-mya [Ancient Burmese Stone Inscriptions] (in Burmese). Vol. 1–5. Yangon: Archaeological Department.
- Royal Historians of Burma (1960) [c. 1680]. U Hla Tin (Hla Thamein) (ed.). Zatadawbon Yazawin. Historical Research Directorate of the Union of Burma.
- Royal Historical Commission of Burma (2003) [1832]. Hmannan Yazawin (in Burmese). Vol. 1–3. Yangon: Ministry of Information, Myanmar.
- Than Tun (December 1959). "History of Burma: A.D. 1300–1400". Journal of Burma Research Society. XLII (II).
- Than Tun (1964). Studies in Burmese History (in Burmese). Vol. 1. Yangon: Maha Dagon.
