= Shin Mauk of Pagan =

Shin Mauk ရှင်မောက်

Queen consort of Burma
- Tenure: c. 1258 – 1287
- Spouse: Narathihapate
- Issue: Thihathu of Pagan
- House: Pagan
- Religion: Theravada Buddhism

Shin Mauk (Burmese: ရှင်မောက်, pronounced [ʃɪ̀ɴ mauʔ]) was a principal queen consort of King Narathihapate of the Pagan Dynasty of Burma (Myanmar). She was the mother of Thihathu of Prome, and a maternal great grandmother of King Swa Saw Ke of Ava.

== Bibliography ==
- Royal Historical Commission of Burma (1832). Hmannan Yazawin (in Burmese). Vol. 1–3 (2003 ed.). Yangon: Ministry of Information, Myanmar.
