= Mekkhaya =

Town in Mandalay Region, Myanmar

Mekkhaya မက္ခရာ
- Location in Myanmar
- Coordinates: 21°46′16″N 96°8′42″E
- Country: MM
- Region: Mandalay Region
- District: Kyaukse District
- Township: Sintgaing Township
- Founded: c. 13th century

Population
  - Ethnicities: Bamar (Burman)
  - Religions: Theravada Buddhism
- Time zone: UTC6:30 (MST)
- Area codes: 2 (mobile: 69, 90)

Mekkhaya (Burmese: မက္ခရာ; also spelled Mekkara) is a small town in Sintgaing Township, Myanmar. It was one of the three capitals of Myanmar from 1297 to 1313 during the Myinsaing period.

== Notable people ==
- Yazathingyan: one of the cofounders of Myinsaing Regency
- Prince of Mekkhaya: 19th-century prince who tried to educational and administrative reforms during the reign of King Mindon
