= Binnaka =

Historical city in Myanmar, associated with the Pyu culture

- ဘိန္နက (Burmese)
- Beinnaka
- Type: Settlement
- Cultures: Pyu, Bagan, Awa, Konbaung
- Location: Pyawbwe Township, Myanmar

Site notes
- Excavation dates: 1980–81
- Archaeologists: Maung Maung Tin

Binnaka (ဘိန္နက [bèɪɰ̃nəka̰], also spelt Beinnaka) is an archaeological site located in present-day Pyawbwe Township, Myanmar. It was one of the major Pyu city-states associated with the Pyu culture and may have been a city as early as the second century BCE. It was also inhabited in later periods, as late as the 1800s.

== Location ==
Binnaka is located in Pyawbwe Township, Myanmar, near the railway line between Yangon and Mandalay. It is located southeast of Bagan and is in the country's dry zone. It is near the Kyaukse plain, which was historically the main rice-growing area in Myanmar.

== Archaeology ==
A team led by Maung Maung Tin conducted preliminary excavations at Binnaka in 1980 and early 1981. A full excavation of the site has not been done. What Maung Maung Tin's team found included "a large masonry slab" that may have originally been a temple's plinth or the foundation of city walls, several terracotta tablets and a brick fragment that all had what appeared to be the Pyu script written on them, burial urns and pottery, coins, and various other objects. The building, pottery, coins, and writing are all very similar to examples found at other "Pyu" sites such as Beikthano and Maingmaw. A distinct, and probably pre-Buddhist, funerary practice where ash and bone were deposited in urns, seems to have been practiced at all three sites, suggesting that they were roughly contemporary, as early as c. 200 BCE.

Both Maingmaw and Beikthano may have been contemporary of Binnaka. The chronicles mentions Binnaka and Maingmaw and states that the ruler of Binnaka was responsible for the fall of Tagaung, the city identified by the chronicles as the original home of Burmese speakers.

Binnaka seems to have remained inhabited until the 1800s, since artifacts from that period also have been found. Artifacts from the period in between have also been found, including some copper items dated to the early Bagan period as well as some items identified with the Awa period. Binnaka appears as late as a palm-leaf sittan record dated to 1833 and called the "sittan of Binnaka", suggesting that the city was part of the Konbaung domain.
