= Thihathu of Prome =

Thihathu of Prome သီဟသူ

Viceroy of Prome
- Reign: 1275–1288
- Predecessor: new office
- Successor: Pazzawta (as governor)
- Chief Minister: Pazzawta
- Born: late 1250s Pagan (Bagan)
- Died: 1288; Pegu (Bago)
- Spouse: Atula Dewi
- Issue: Shin Myat Hla
- House: Pagan
- Father: Narathihapate
- Mother: Shin Mauk
- Religion: Theravada Buddhism

Thihathu of Prome (Burmese: သီဟသူ, pronounced [θìha̰θù]; d. 1288), or Sihasura, was viceroy of Prome (Pyay) from 1275 to 1288. He is known in Burmese history for assassinating his own father King Narathihapate, the last sovereign king of the Pagan Empire, in 1287. He was the maternal grandfather of King Swa Saw Ke of Ava.

== Biography ==
Thihathu was born to Queen Shin Mauk and Narathihapate in the late 1250s in Pagan (Bagan). Thihathu grew up at the palace alongside his half-brothers Uzana and Kyawswa, and appeared to have been the black sheep of the family. According to the royal chronicles, the king constantly teased Thihathu in front of others, for which Thihathu nursed malice toward his father.

Nonetheless, in 1275, he was appointed viceroy of Prome (Pyay), which was reestablished at the old city of Thray Khittaya (Sri Ksetra).

His chance for payback came during the Mongol invasion of the country in 1283–85. Instead of defending the country, Narathihapate fled Pagan for Lower Burma in panic. The king finally became a Mongol vassal in 1287 and returned to Pagan with a small retinue. En route at Prome, on 1 July 1287, Thihathu arrested his father and forced him to take poison. To refuse would have meant death by the sword, and with a prayer on his lips that in all his future existences "may no male-child be ever born to him again", the king swallowed the poison and died.

Thihathu next tried to kill off his two rival half-brothers, Uzana (Governor of Pathein) and Kyawswa (Governor of Dala) as they were also potential claimants to the throne. Thihathu first went to Pathein, entered Uzana's chambers, where he lay sick, and hacked him to pieces. He then sailed to Dala to kill Kyawswa. Kyawswa had fortified Dala, and withstood Thihathu's several charges to take the port city. Thihathu then went northeast of Dala to Pegu, whose ruler had also fortified the city. At the Pegu harbor, as he tried to shoot one of the guards with his crossbow, he accidentally killed himself with his own arrow.

== Family ==
Thihathu was married to Atula Dewi, the youngest and only sister of the three brothers who would later found the Myinsaing Kingdom. They had at least one daughter, Shin Myat Hla, the mother of King Swa Saw Ke of Ava.

== Bibliography ==
- Harvey, G. E. (1925). History of Burma: From the Earliest Times to 10 March 1824. London: Frank Cass & Co. Ltd.
- Htin Aung, Maung (1967). A History of Burma. New York and London: Cambridge University Press.
- Kala, U (2006) [1724]. Maha Yazawin (in Burmese). Vol. 1–3 (4th printing ed.). Yangon: Ya-Pyei Publishing.
- Maha Sithu (2012) [1798]. Kyaw Win; Thein Hlaing (eds.). Yazawin Thit (in Burmese). Vol. 1–3 (2nd ed.). Yangon: Ya-Pyei Publishing.
- Pe Maung Tin; Luce, G.H. (1960) [1923]. The Glass Palace Chronicle of the Kings of Burma. Rangoon University Press.
- Royal Historical Commission of Burma (2003) [1832]. Hmannan Yazawin (in Burmese). Vol. 1–3. Yangon: Ministry of Information, Myanmar.

Thihathu of Prome Pagan Dynasty Born: late 1250s Died: 1288
Royal titles
New title	Viceroy of Prome; 1275 – 1288	Succeeded by Pazzawta as governor
