= Michael Aung-Thwin =

Burmese American historian and professor (1946–2021)

- မိုက်ကယ်အောင်သွင်
- Born: 1946; Rangoon, Burma
- Died: 14 August 2021 (aged 74–75); Hawaii, United States
- Occupation: Historian
- Title: Emeritus Professor of Asian History
- Spouse: Maria Aung-Thwin
- Children: Maitrii, Amita

Academic background
- Education: Doane College; University of Illinois Urbana-Champaign; University of Michigan

Academic work
- Discipline: Southeast Asian History
- Institutions: University of Hawaiʻi at Mānoa

Michael Arthur Aung-Thwin (1946 – August 14, 2021; Burmese: မိုက်ကယ်အောင်သွင်) was a Burmese American historian and emeritus professor at the University of Hawaiʻi at Mānoa, specializing in early Southeast Asian and Burmese history.

== Early life and education ==
Aung-Thwin was born in Rangoon, Burma (now Yangon, Myanmar) in 1946. Aung-Thwin's mother, Margaret Hope Aung-Thwin, of mixed Anglo-Burmese, Karen, and Arakanese descent, was a Fulbright scholar and lecturer. He attended Kodaikanal International School in South India, where his mother taught. He earned a bachelor of arts degree at Doane College in 1969, followed by a master of arts degree at University of Illinois Urbana-Champaign in 1971, and a PhD at the University of Michigan.

== Academic career ==
Aung-Thwin held academic posts at Elmira College, Kyoto University, Northern Illinois University, the National University of Singapore (NUS), and the University of Hawaii-Manoa. He served as the Director of the Center for Southeast Asian Studies, Northern Illinois University. In 2018, he was awarded the George E. Bogaars endowed professorship at NUS.

== Death ==
Aung-Thwin died at his home in Hawaii on August 14, 2021, after a long illness.

== Publications ==
- Pagan: The Origins of Modern Burma (1985)
- Myth & history in the historiography of early Burma (1998)
- The Mists of Ramanna: The Legend that was Lower Burma (2005)
- A History of Myanmar Since Ancient Times: Traditions and Transformations (2013)
- Myanmar in the Fifteenth Century: A Tale of Two Kingdoms (2017)

== Personal life ==
Aung-Thwin was married to Maria, and had two children, Maitrii and Amita. Maitrii Aung-Thwin is a Burmese American historian and professor at NUS.
