= Ava–Hanthawaddy War (1385–1391) orders of battle =

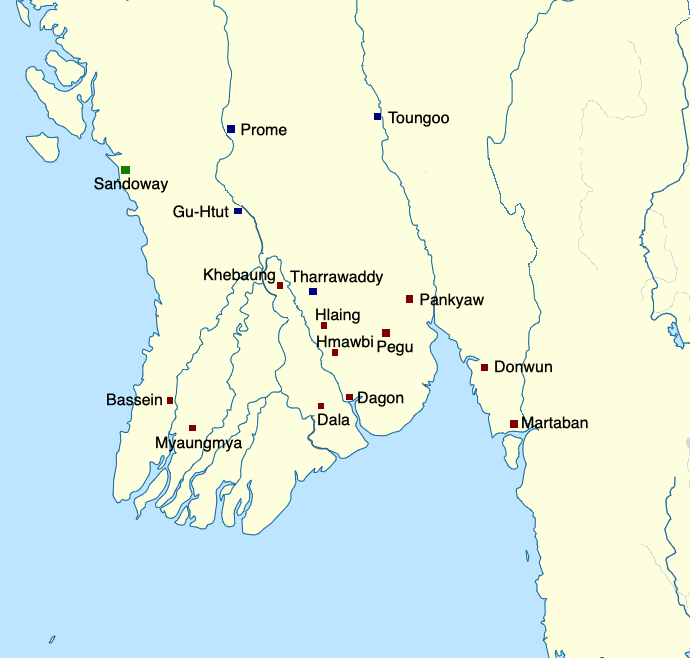
Key locations of the war

This is a list of orders of battle for the First Ava–Hanthawaddy War in which the Royal Ava Armed Forces and their allies Myaungmya armed forces fought the Royal Hanthawaddy Armed Forces between 1385 and 1391.

== Background ==
=== Sources ===
The orders of battles for Ava in this article are sourced from the main royal chronicles—the Maha Yazawin, the Yazawin Thit and the Hmannan Yazawin, which primarily narrate the war from the Ava side, and provide a specific order of battle for each of the Ava campaigns; the chronicles also typically (but not always) provide the opposing forces' strength as part of their narratives. (Note: See (Maha Yazawin Vol. 1 2006: 291, 295, 301), (Yazawin Thit Vol. 1 2012: 196, 198, 202) and (Hmannan Vol. 1 2003: 417–418, 422, 429–430).)

The extant information for the orders of battles for Hanthawaddy Pegu is not as detailed. The Razadarit Ayedawbon chronicle, which narrates the war from the Hanthawaddy perspective, provides only occasional facts and figures on the Hanthawaddy forces, and even less on the opposing forces. Therefore, this article uses the limited orders of battle information on the Hanthawaddy side reported in the main chronicles. (Note: See (Pan Hla 2005) for the reporting in the Razadarit Ayedawbon chronicle of the Hanthawaddy army's formations. See (Maha Yazawin Vol. 1 2003: 291–301), (Yazawin Thit Vol. 2012: 196–202), (Hmannan Vol. 1 2003: 417–430) for Ava's side reporting of Hanthawaddy formations throughout the war.)

=== Adjustment of strength figures ===
The military strength figures in this article have been reduced by an order of magnitude from those reported in the chronicles, following G.E. Harvey's and Victor Lieberman's analyses of Burmese chronicles' military strength figures in general. (Note: See (Harvey 1925: 333–335)'s "Numerical Note". (Lieberman 2014: 98) writing on the First Toungoo period concurs: "Military mobilizations were probably more of a boast than a realistic estimate. Modern industrial states have difficulty placing 10% of their people under arms.") Specifically for this war, historians' estimates range from 12,000 to 30,000+ troops for Ava (as opposed to 130,000 to 290,000 infantry reported in the chronicles). (Note: (Harvey 1925: 82 and 82 footnote 1): G.E. Harvey estimated that "the total strength of the invaders [Ava forces] would usually be about 12,000... partly because the Hmannan figure is usually 120,000 and the chronicles habitually over-estimate by ten". However, Harvey misquoted Hmannan since the chronicle does not report 120,000 anywhere for any of the campaigns of the war. Nor do any other main chronicles. All three main chronicles report 130,000 troops for the first invasion ((Maha Yazawin Vol. 1 2006: 291), (Yazawin Thit Vol. 1 2012: 196) and (Hmannan Vol. 1 2003: 417–418)); 290,000 troops for the second invasion ((Maha Yazawin Vol. 1 2006: 295), (Yazawin Thit Vol. 1 2012: 198) and (Hmannan Vol. 1 2003: 422)); and 290,000 troops for the third invasion ((Maha Yazawin Vol. 1 2006: 301), (Yazawin Thit Vol. 1 2012: 202) and (Hmannan Vol. 1 2003: 429–430)). (Aung-Thwin 2017: 64, 66): Michael Aung-Thwin's estimates of Ava's total strength were 20,000 to 33,000 troops for the campaigns.)

=== Composition of the opposing forces ===
In all the three invasions, Ava raised the vast majority of its regiments from districts around the capital (Ava, Pinle, Pinya, Myinsaing, Sagaing); central and southern districts along the Irrawaddy River (Pagan, Sagu, Salin, Pakhan Gyi, Myede and Prome); and south and southeastern districts (Nyaungyan, Yamethin, Taungdwin, Toungoo). Of its northern districts only Kale contributed a regiment in the first and second invasions while Dabayin, Amyint and two Shan regiments participated in the second invasion. However, after its war with the northern Maw kingdom (1387–1389/90), Ava did not include any northern regiments in its third invasion of Hanthawaddy Pegu in 1390–1391.

The Hanthawaddy army that withstood Ava's first two invasions consisted of troops from the central Hanthawaddy province (Dala, Dagon, Hlaing, Hmawbi and Pegu), the only province King Razadarit controlled. It was only in 1390 after Razadarit had conquered Martaban and Myaungmya provinces that the Hanthawaddy army was able to field its largest force, drawn from all three provinces.

== First invasion (1385–1386) ==
=== Ava ===
Ava Order of Battle, 1385–1386
Unit	Commander	Strength (Note: Unless otherwise stated, the military mobilization figures in this article are reduced by an order of magnitude from those reported in the royal chronicles, per G.E. Harvey's analysis in his History of Burma (1925) in the section Numerical Note (pp. 333–335).)	Notes	Reference(s)
1st Army	Crown Prince Tarabya	9 regiments; 7000 infantry, 500 cavalry, 20 elephants	Sittaung Front via Toungoo (Taungoo)	
Kale Regiment	Lord of Kale			
Toungoo Regiment	Phaungga of Toungoo			
Taungdwin Regiment	Thihapate II of Taungdwin			
Yamethin Regiment	Thilawa of Yamethin			
Sagaing Regiment	Yazathingyan of Sagaing			
Sagu Regiment	Theinkhathu of Sagu			
Myede Regiment	Thinkhaya of Myede			
Wadi Regiment	Lord of Wadi			
Ava Regiment	Crown Prince Tarabya of Ava			
2nd Army	Prince Min Swe	9 regiments; 6000 infantry, 500 cavalry, 20 elephants	Northern Delta Front via Tharrawaddy	
Pinle Regiment	Min Letwe of Pinle		Killed in action †	
Prome Regiment	Myet-Hna Shay of Prome			
Pinya Regiment	Thray Waduna of Pinya			
Salin Regiment	Lord of Salin			
Talok Regiment	Yazathu of Talok			
Pakhan Gyi Regiment	Lord of Pakhan			
Pagan Regiment	Sithu of Pagan			
Nyaungyan Regiment	Lord of Nyaungyan			
Pyinzi Regiment	Prince Min Swe of Pyinzi			
Myaungmya Flotilla	Viceroy Laukpya of Myaungmya	unknown	Southern Delta Front via Myaungmya to Dagon	

=== Hanthawaddy Pegu ===
Pegu Order of Battle, 1385–1386
Unit	Commander	Strength	Notes	Reference(s)
Main Army	King Razadarit	at least 8 regiments		
Pankyaw Regiment	Nandameit	?	Killed in action †	
Hlaing Regiment	Smin Zeik-Pun	?	Captured by Ava	
Hmawbi Regiment	Smin E-Kaung-Pein	?		
Dagon Regiment	unnamed	?		
Royal Regiment	King Razadarit	1000+ troops		

== Second invasion (1386–1387) ==
=== Ava ===
Ava Order of Battle, 1386–1387
Unit	Commander	Strength	Notes	Reference(s)
Army	Crown Prince Tarabya	11 regiments; 12,000 infantry, 600 cavalry, 40 elephants	Northern Delta Front	
Toungoo Regiment	Phaungga of Toungoo			
Taungdwin Regiment	Thihapate II of Taungdwin			
Yamethin Regiment	Thilawa of Yamethin			
Pinle Regiment	Thray Thinkhaya of Pinle			
Myinsaing Regiment	Thray Sithu of Myinsaing			
Kale Regiment	Lord of Kale			
Pinya Regiment	Thray Waduna of Pinya			
Nyaungyan Regiment	Tuyin Ponnya of Nyaungyan			
Dabayin Regiment	Lord of Dabayin			
Amyint Regiment	Lord of Amyint			
Ava Regiment	Crown Prince Tarabya of Ava			
Navy	King Swa Saw Ke	9 regiments and 1 flotilla; 17,000 infantry, 100 transport ships, 120 war boats	Southern Delta Front via the Irrawaddy river	
Prome Regiment	Myet-Hna Shay of Prome			
Myede Regiment	Thinkhaya of Myede			
Sagu Regiment	Theinkhathu of Sagu			
Salin Regiment	Lord of Salin			
Talok Regiment	Yazathu of Talok			
Pakhan Gyi Regiment	Lord of Pakhan Gyi			
Sagaing Regiment	Yazathingyan of Sagaing			
1st Shan Regiment	unnamed			
2nd Shan Regiment	unnamed			
Royal Flotilla	King Swa Saw Ke			
Myaungmya Flotilla	Viceroy Laukpya of Myaungmya	200 transport ships, 5 warships, 70 war boats	Southern Delta Front	

=== Hanthawaddy Pegu ===
Pegu Order of Battle, 1386–1387
Unit	Commander	Strength	Notes	Reference(s)
Main Army	King Razadarit	5 regiments; 6000 infantry, ? cavalry, 20 elephants	Pegu and Northern Delta	
1st Vanguard Regiment	Than-Byat			
2nd Vanguard Regiment	Sit-Laung			
3rd Vanguard Regiment	Smin Yawgarat			
4th Vanguard Regiment	Byat Za			
Royal Regiment	King Razadarit			
Hlaing Regiment	Dein Mani-Yut Smin Ye-Thin-Yan (deputy)	500 troops	Northern Delta Front	
Hmawbi Regiment			Northern Delta Front	
Dagon Regiment			Southern Delta Front	
Dala Regiment	Nyi Kan-Kaung		Southern Delta Front	

== Hanthawaddy Pegu–Myaungmya (1389–1390) ==
=== Hanthawaddy Pegu ===
Pegu Order of Battle, 1389–1390
Unit	Commander	Strength	Notes	Reference(s)
Main Army	King Razadarit	At least 4 regiments; ? infantry, 10+ elephants	Battles of Bassein, Myaungmya	(Note: The Razadarit Ayedawbon (Pan Hla 2005: 185–190) does not mention the total strength of the Hanthawaddy forces for this campaign. Per (Pan Hla 2005: 185–186), Razadarit briefly left the front for Dala after the first battle of Bassein, and returned to the front before the battle of Myaungmya. During his absence, Dein commanded the remaining troops over 10,000 strong (which after adjusting down by an order of magnitude means over 1000 strong).)
1st Regiment	Dein Mani-Yut	1000+ troops, ? elephants	Battle of Daybethwe	
2nd Regiment	Byat Za	700 troops, 10 elephants	Siege of Sandoway	
Naval Squadron	Lagun Ein	20+ war boats	Battle of Pan Hlaing	
Gu-Htut Regiment	Smin Baykhatta; Smin Than-Kye	?	Occupation of Gu-Htut	
Royal Regiment	King Razadarit			

=== Myaungmya ===
Myaungmya Order of Battle, 1389–1390
Unit	Commander	Strength	Notes	Reference(s)
Myaungmya Army	Ma Pyit-Nwe	1000+ infantry, ? elephants, ? war boats		(Note: (Pan Hla 2005: 189) says over 10,000 troops surrendered after the battle of Myaungmya. This means Myangmya likely had more than 1000 troops, after adjusting by the chronicle figure by an order of magnitude. Furthermore, per (Pan Hla 2005: 187–188), Myaungmya defenses also included war elephants.)
Daybathwe Battalion	Saw E Binnya			
Bassein Regiment	Lauk Shein Deputies: Bya Kun, Bya Kyin	1000 troops, ? elephants, 50+ war boats		
Bassein Naval Squadron	Lauk Shein	50+ war boats		

== Third invasion (1390–1391) ==
=== Ava ===
Ava Order of Battle, 1390–1391
Unit	Commander	Strength	Notes	Reference(s)
Army	Crown Prince Tarabya	12 regiments; 12,000 infantry, 1000 cavalry, 80 elephants		
Toungoo Regiment	Phaungga of Toungoo			
Taungdwin Regiment	Thihapate II of Taungdwin			
Yamethin Regiment	Thilawa of Yamethin			
Pinle Regiment	Thray Thinkhaya of Pinle			
Myinsaing Regiment	Thray Sithu of Myinsaing			
Nyaungyan Regiment	Tuyin Ponnya of Nyaungyan			
Five Irrigated Districts Regiment	Sithu Thanbawa			
Pinya Regiment	Thray Waduna of Pinya			
Sagaing Regiment	Yazathingyan of Sagaing			
Paukmyaing Regiment	Min Pale of Paukmyaing			
Pyinzi Regiment	Prince Min Swe of Pyinzi			
Ava Regiment	Crown Prince Tarabya of Ava			
Navy	King Swa Saw Ke	9 regiments & 1 flotilla; 17,000 infantry, 200 transport ships, 80 war boats	Northern Delta Front via the Irrawaddy river	
Prome Regiment	Letya Pyanchi of Prome			
Myede Regiment	Thinkhaya of Myede			
Sagu Regiment	Theinkhathu of Sagu			
Salin Regiment	Nawrahta of Salin			
Pagan Regiment	Uzana of Pagan			
Talok Regiment	Yazathu of Talok			
Pakhan Gyi Regiment	Tarabya I of Pakhan			
Singu Regiment	Letya the Elder of Singu			
Royal Flotilla	King Swa Saw Ke			

=== Hanthawaddy Pegu ===
Pegu Order of Battle, 1390–1391
Unit	Commander	Strength	Notes	Reference(s)
Main Army	King Razadarit	8 regiments; 8000 infantry, 40 elephants	Sittaung Front	
1st Regiment	Byat Za			
2nd Regiment	Dein Mani-Yut			
3rd Regiment	Smin Ye-Thin-Yan			
4th Regiment	Smin Maw-Khwin			
5th Regiment	Smin E-Ba-Ye			
6th Regiment	Lagun Ein			
7th Regiment	Nyi Kan-Kaung			
Royal Regiment	King Razadarit			
Gu-Htut Corps	Smin Than-Kye	1 regiment & 4 naval squadrons; 5000 troops, 150 war boats	Northern Delta Front	
1st Naval Squadron	Maha Thamun			
2nd Naval Squadron	Smin Pun-Si			
3rd Naval Squadron	Smin E-Kaung-Pein			
4th Naval Squadron	Smin Bya Paik			
Gu-Htut Regiment	Smin Than-Kye			

== Bibliography ==
- Aung-Thwin, Michael A. (2017). Myanmar in the Fifteenth Century. Honolulu: University of Hawai'i Press. ISBN 978-0-8248-6783-6.
- Harvey, G. E. (1925). History of Burma: From the Earliest Times to 10 March 1824. London: Frank Cass & Co. Ltd.
- Kala, U (2006) [1724]. Maha Yazawin (in Burmese). Vol. 1–3 (4th printing ed.). Yangon: Ya-Pyei Publishing.
- Lieberman, Victor B. (2014) [1984]. Burmese Administrative Cycles: Anarchy and Conquest, c. 1580–1760. Princeton University Press. ISBN 978-0-691-05407-0.
- Maha Sithu (2012) [1798]. Myint Swe; Kyaw Win; Thein Hlaing (eds.). Yazawin Thit (in Burmese). Vol. 1–3 (2nd printing ed.). Yangon: Ya-Pyei Publishing.
- Pan Hla, Nai (2005) [1968]. Razadarit Ayedawbon (in Burmese) (8th printing ed.). Yangon: Armanthit Sarpay.
- Royal Historical Commission of Burma (2003) [1832]. Hmannan Yazawin (in Burmese). Vol. 1–3. Yangon: Ministry of Information, Myanmar.
