= Thettawshay of Sikyay =

Thettawshay of Sikyay; စည်းကျေး သက်တော်ရှည်
- Born: c. 1340s Pinya Kingdom
- Died: ? Ava Kingdom
- Spouse: Daughter of Shwe Nan Shin; Saw Min Hla
- Issue: Thray Waduna; Maha Thinkhaya
- Father: Min Letwe

Thettawshay of Sikyay (Burmese: စည်းကျေး သက်တော်ရှည်, pronounced [sídʑé θɛʔdɔ̀ʃè]) was a grandson of King Kyawswa I of Pinya (r. 1344–1350). He is recognized as a patrilineal ancestor of the early Toungoo dynasty kings, including, Mingyi Nyo, Tabinshwehti and Nanda.

== Brief ==
All three main chronicles—the Maha Yazawin, Yazawin Thit, and Hmannan Yazawin—identify one Thettawshay as a patrilineal ancestor of King Mingyi Nyo (r. 1510–1530), the founder of the Toungoo Dynasty. The chronicles, however, do not agree on specific genealogical details.

- Regarding his ancestry, the Maha Yazawin says Thettawshay was a son of Governor Shwe Nan Shin of Myinsaing. The Yazawin Thit states he was a son-in-law of Shwe Nan Shin, and his father was Min Letwe of Sikyay, a son of King Kyawswa I of Pinya and Queen Mway Medaw of Pinya. The Hmannan agrees with the Yazawin Thit's account.
- Regarding his descendants, the Maha Yazawin says Mingyi Nyo was his three times great grandson, through his son Thray Waduna of Pinya. The Yazawin Thit states Mingyi Nyo was his two times great grandson, through his son titled Maha Thinkhaya I. The Hmannan generally accepts the Yazawin Thit's lineage but disagrees with the Yazawin Thit on the identity of the mother of Maha Thinkhaya I. The Hmannan names her as Saw Min Hla, daughter of Min Letya, not the daughter of Shwe Nan Shin, as stated in the Yazawin Thit.

Historian Sein Lwin Lay's 1968 analysis (Note: According to Sein Lwin Lay, several historical sources about the ancestry of Mingyi Nyo and Tabinshwehti provide different, often conflicting information. His analysis considered the Maha Yazawin, Hmannan, and the Min Taya Shwe-Hti Eigyin (a chronicle in verse), and the paper and parabaik versions of the Toungoo Yazawin. He also provided the 20th stanza of the eigyin, chronicle in verse.) on the ancestry of King Mingyi Nyo essentially follows the Maha Yazawin's account. One key difference is that he changed Thettawshay's father to King Kyawswa I of Pinya. He did not provide an explanation as to how he arrived at this specific list, however. (Note: Sein Lwin Lay's analysis does not explain why it: Identifies Kyawswa I of Pinya as Thettawshay's father, and not grandfather as in the Yazawin Thit and Hmannan chronicles. One possible reason may be to maintain the seven generations between Kyawswa I of Pinya and Mingyi Nyo as in the Yazawin Thit and Hmannan.; Follows the Maha Yazawin for Thettawshay's descendants down to Mingyi Nyo.)

The following table lists the chronicle accounts and Sein Lwin Lay's account regarding Mingyi Nyo's ancestry.

Generation	Maha Yazawin (1724)	Yazawin Thit (1798)	Hmannan Yazawin (1832)	(Sein Lwin Lay 1968)
Grandparents	not mentioned	Kyawswa I of Pinya +; Mway Medaw of Pinya	Kyawswa I of Pinya +; Mway Medaw of Pinya	not mentioned
Parents	Shwe Nan Shin of Myinsaing	Min Letwe of Sikyay	Min Letwe of Sikyay	Kyawswa I of Pinya
Self + wife	Thettawshay	Thettawshay +; daughter of Shwe Nan Shin of Myinsaing	Thettawshay +; daughter of Min Letya of Nyaungyan	Thettawshay
Son + wife	Thray Waduna of Pinya	Maha Thinkhaya I +; unnamed second wife	Maha Thinkhaya I +; Shwe Pan, daughter of Yazathu of Talok	Thray Waduna of Pinya
Grandson	Thray Sithu	Maha Thinkhaya II	Maha Thinkhaya II	Thray Sithu
Great grandson	Thray Thinkhaya	Maha Thinkhaya III	Maha Thinkhaya III	Thray Thinkhaya
2x great grandson	Maha Thinkhaya	Mingyi Nyo	Mingyi Nyo	Maha Thinkhaya
3x great grandson	Mingyi Nyo	not mentioned	not mentioned	Mingyi Nyo

== Bibliography ==
- Kala, U (2006) [1724]. Maha Yazawin (in Burmese). Vol. 1–3 (4th printing ed.). Yangon: Ya-Pyei Publishing.
- Maha Sithu (2012) [1798]. Myint Swe; Kyaw Win; Thein Hlaing (eds.). Yazawin Thit (in Burmese). Vol. 1–3 (2nd printing ed.). Yangon: Ya-Pyei Publishing.
- Royal Historical Commission of Burma (2003) [1832]. Hmannan Yazawin (in Burmese). Vol. 1–3. Yangon: Ministry of Information, Myanmar.
- Sein Lwin Lay, Kahtika U (2006) [1968]. Mintaya Shwe Hti and Bayinnaung: Ketumadi Taungoo Yazawin (in Burmese) (2nd printing ed.). Yangon: Yan Aung Sarpay.
