= Tabinshwehti =

Founder of the First Toungoo Empire

Tabinshwehti; တပင်‌ရွှေထီး
- King of Toungoo
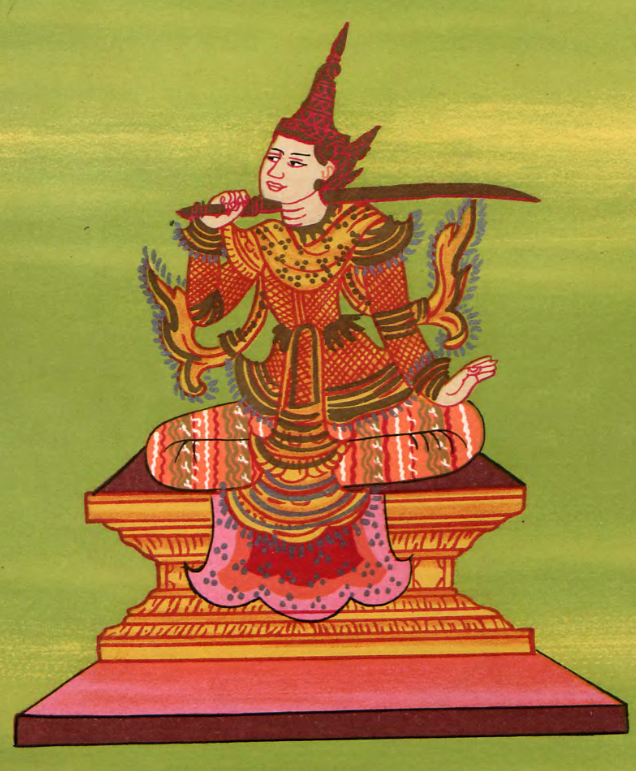
- Tabinshwehti Nat

King of Burma
- Reign: 24 November 1530 – 30 April 1550
- Coronation: 24 November 1530
- Predecessor: Mingyi Nyo
- Successor: Bayinnaung
- Born: 16 April 1516; Wednesday, 1st waning of Kason 878 ME; Toungoo (Taungoo)
- Died: 30 April 1550 (aged 34); Wednesday, 1st waning of Kason 912 ME; near Pantanaw
- Burial: near Pantanaw
- Spouse: Dhamma Dewi; Khin Myat; Khay Ma Naw
- Issue: Min Letya; Hanthawaddy Mibaya
- House: Toungoo
- Father: Mingyi Nyo
- Mother: Yaza Dewi
- Religion: Theravada Buddhism

Tabinshwehti (Burmese: တပင်‌ရွှေထီး, [dəbɪ̀ɰ̃ ʃwè tʰí]; 16 April 1516 – 30 April 1550) was king of Burma from 1530 to 1550, and the founder of the First Toungoo Empire. His military campaigns (1534–1549) created the largest kingdom in Burma since the fall of the Pagan Empire in 1287. His administratively fragile kingdom proved to be the impetus for the eventual reunification of the entire country by his successor and brother-in-law Bayinnaung.

Based out of their small landlocked principality in the Sittaung valley, Tabinshwehti and his deputy Bayinnaung began their military campaigns in 1534 against the Hanthawaddy kingdom, and had conquered the wealthier but disunited kingdom by 1541. He then leveraged the coastal kingdom's wealth, manpower and access to Portuguese mercenaries and firearms, and extended his rule to the ancient capital of Pagan (Bagan) in 1544. However, his attempts to build an East-West empire fell short in Arakan (1545–1547) and in Siam (1547–1549). He actively courted the support of ethnic Mons of Lower Burma, many of whom were appointed to the highest positions in his government and armed forces. His chief queen and chief primate were Mons. He moved the capital to Pegu (Bago). The king was assassinated on his 34th birthday on the orders of Smim Sawhtut, one of his close advisers. The kingdom he had built up fell apart right after his death, which Bayinnaung had to restore in the next two years.

His premature death has been called "one of the great turning points of mainland [Southeast Asia's] history". He is one of the most celebrated kings in Burmese history. The Tabinshwehti nat is one of the 37 nats (spirits) worshiped in Myanmar.

== Early life ==
=== Birth ===
Tabinshwehti was born at Toungoo Palace to King Mingyi Nyo of Toungoo and his concubine Khin Oo on 16 April 1516. The 56-year-old king, who had desperately wanted a son, named the baby boy "Tabinshwehti"—meaning "Unitary Golden Umbrella", with the golden umbrella being the symbol of Burmese kings—and made him the heir-apparent of his small kingdom. The king also raised the boy's teenage mother to queen with the title of Yaza Dewi. From his father side, Tabinshwehti was a great-great-great-grandson of King Minkhaung I of Ava, and great-great-grandson of Crown Prince Minye Kyawswa. (Note: (Hmannan Vol. 2 2003: 171): Mingyi Nyo's maternal grandmother Min Hla Htut, Princess of Pyakaung, was a daughter of Minye Kyawswa.) His mother Khin Oo (sometimes reported as Khin Mya) was a commoner, daughter of the village chief of Le Way (today a township in the Naypyidaw Union Territory).

=== Childhood and education ===
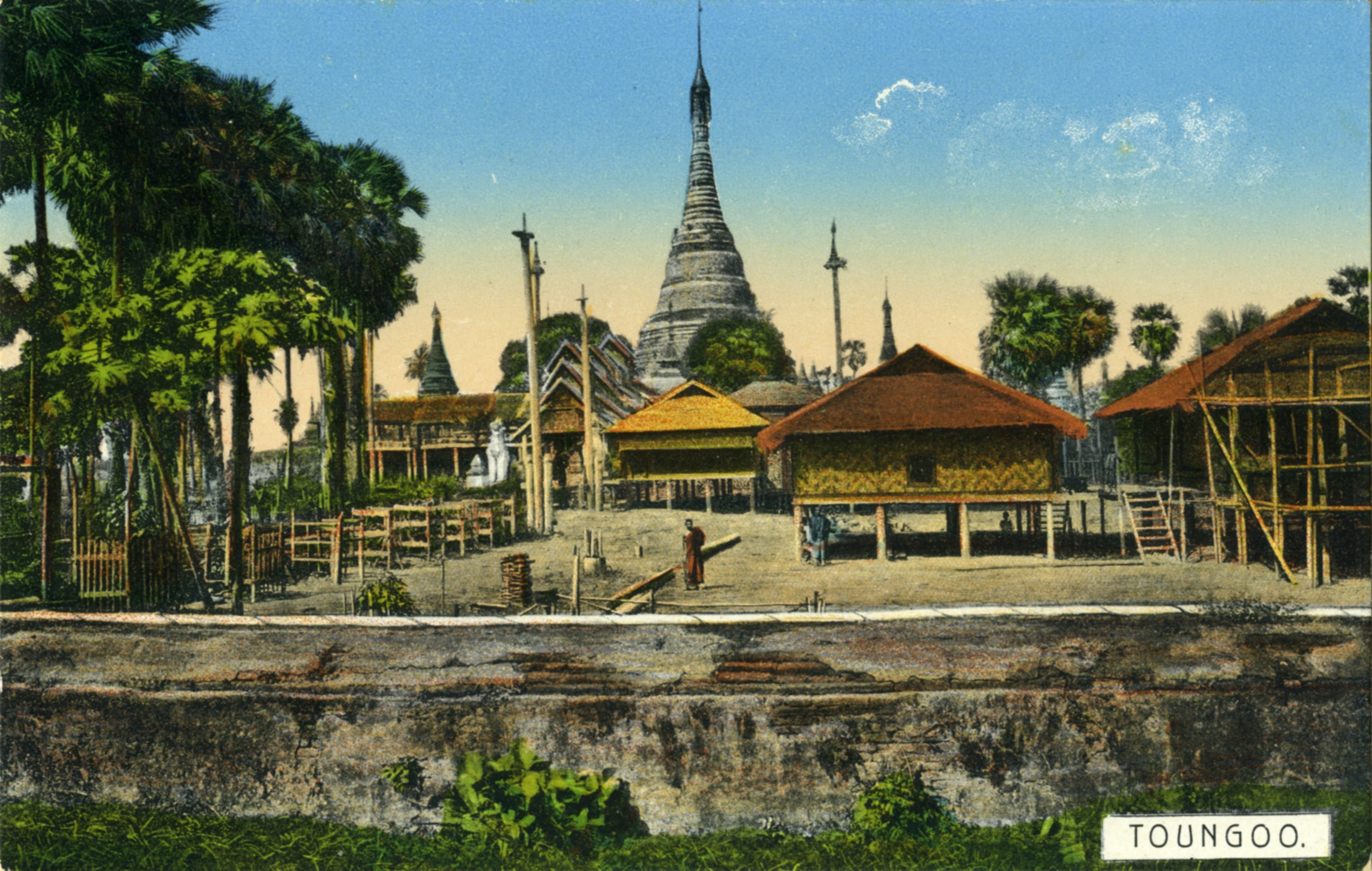
Old Toungoo

The young prince was cared for by seven royal servants (two women and five men) throughout his childhood and youth. He grew up playing with children of his servants, including one Ye Htut, the eldest son of Mingyi Swe and his wet nurse Myo Myat. Ye Htut, who was three months older, would become Tabinshwehti's right-hand man.

The young crown prince grew up having to live up to a prophecy at his birth, which claimed that he would grow up to be a great warrior just like Minye Kyawswa. The prophecy of a Minye Kyawswa reincarnate may have been popular in the superstitious world of Burmese politics since Upper Burma was going through immense political turmoil and decades-long internecine warfare. Since the 1480s, the once dominant power of Upper Burma, Ava, had been unable to prevent its key vassal states from breaking away. His father, who himself had broken away from Ava since 1510, required his son to receive an education in military arts. Tabinshwehiti along with Ye Htut and other young men at the palace received training in martial arts, horseback riding, elephant riding, and military strategy.

==== Childhood legend and prophecy ====
According to prophecy, Tabinshwehti was the reincarnation of a prince named Minye Kyawswa who had been put to death by his father King Dhammazedi of Hanthawaddy. The prince supposedly prayed the same prayer as Prince Bawlawkyantaw of Hanthawaddy before the latter was put to death by his father King Razadarit in 1390. As Minye Kyawswa of Ava, who was believed to be the reincarnation of Bawlawkyantaw, grew up to be the nemesis of Hanthawaddy, Tabinshwehti, believed to be the reincarnation of Minye Kyawswa of Hanthawaddy, according to the prophecy, would be the nemesis of Hanthawaddy.

Local legends mention that even though Tabinshwehti was born during the nighttime, the swords in the armory shone brightly. This was believed to be an omen that he would be a strong warrior.

=== Siege of Toungoo ===
His first experience with warfare came in 1525 when Ava's forces led by King Narapati II unsuccessfully laid siege to Toungoo from April to May. (Note: The siege lasted from April to May 1525 for the following reasons. First, the chronicle Toungoo Yazawin (Sein Lwin Lay 2006: 105–106) says the siege by Avan forces came after the city of Ava fell to the Confederation forces on Saturday, 14th waning of Tabaung 886 ME. However, 14th waning of Tabaung 886 ME translates to Wednesday (not Saturday), 22 March 1525. Secondly, Hmannan Yazawin (Hmannan Vol. 2 2003: 134) says the siege was called off after a month before the rainy season began.) In the following years, his father's little principality gained more manpower as refugees from Upper Burma in search of a safe haven streamed in. The influx accelerated after Ava finally fell for good to the forces of Confederation of Shan States on 25 March 1527.

== Early reign ==
=== Accession ===
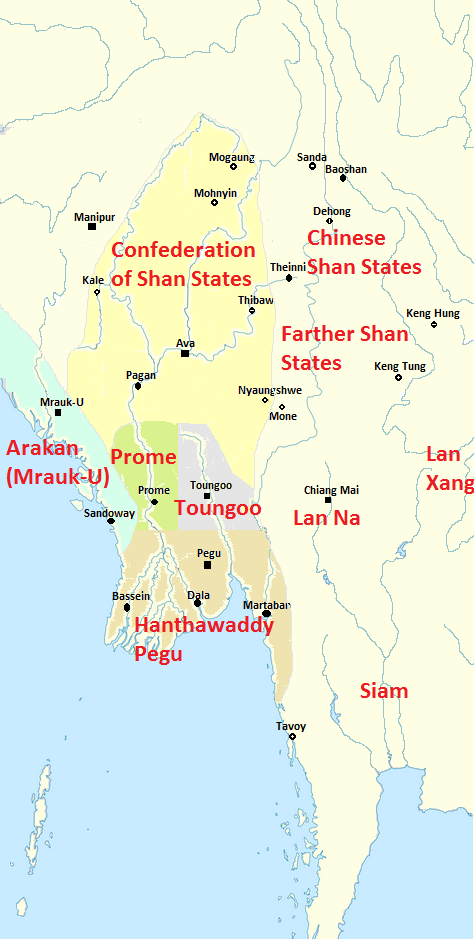
Political Map of Burma (Myanmar) at Tabinshwehti's accession

Mingyi Nyo died on 24 November 1530, and the 14-year-old prince ascended to the throne at once. He rewarded all his childhood staff by handing out royal titles, and by marrying two of their daughters—Khin Hpone Soe, daughter of Mingyi Swe and sister of Ye Htut, and Khin Myat, daughter of Shin Nita. He also installed his young friends, including Ye Htut, as confidants.

=== Thakin Gyi and Ye Htut ===
The young king's first important decision came c. April 1534, (Note: The Hmannan Yazawin chronicle (Hmannan Vol. 3 2003: 61) only gives 896 ME (29 March 1534 to 29 March 1535) for the date of the marriage between Bayinnaung and Thakin Gyi (Atula Thiri). But they must have got married in early 896 ME around April 1534 since the couple had their second child, Nanda Bayin, in November 1535.) when the affair between his half-sister Thakin Gyi and his right-hand man Ye Htut was discovered. The affair under Burmese law constituted an act of treason. Ye Htut, for his part, spurned suggestions of mutiny and submitted to arrest. Tabinshwehti deliberated at length with his ministers, and finally came to the conclusion that Ye Htut should be given his sister in marriage, and a princely title of Kyawhtin Nawrahta. With this decision, Tabinshwehti won the loyalty of his brother-in-law "without parallel in Burmese history".

=== Choosing war ===
Meanwhile, war had arrived uncomfortably close to his realm. In late 1532, the Confederation of Shan States, already ruling much of Upper Burma, attacked its erstwhile ally Prome, and sacked the city. Although the Confederation was content to keep Prome as a vassal, the Toungoo leadership was concerned that their city east of Prome on the same latitude, separated only by the Pegu Yoma (Bago Yoma) range, was an "obvious next target." To be sure, Toungoo did have some advantages. Tucked away behind the Pegu Yoma range, the city was not easy to march from Ava in contrast to Prome on the Irrawaddy, which was easily accessible from Ava. Moreover, swelled by refugees, the principality now commanded considerably more manpower than its traditional base would have allowed for. Nevertheless, the Toungoo leadership decided that their kingdom "had to act quickly if it wished to avoid being swallowed up" by the Confederation.

In late 1534, in a complete break from his father's longstanding policy, Tabinshwehti decided to break out of his increasingly narrow realm by attacking the Hanthawaddy kingdom to the south. Though the Burmese chronicles attribute the audacious decision to the king alone, the 18-year-old king was more probably persuaded by older more experienced ministers at the court, who may have also played a major role in the initial campaigns. In the next 16 years, Tabinshwehti along with his deputy Kyawhtin Nawrahta (later Bayinnaung) would go on to unite many of the petty kingdoms that had existed since the fall of the Pagan Empire in 1287.

== Founding of Toungoo Empire ==
=== Lower Burma (1534–1541) ===
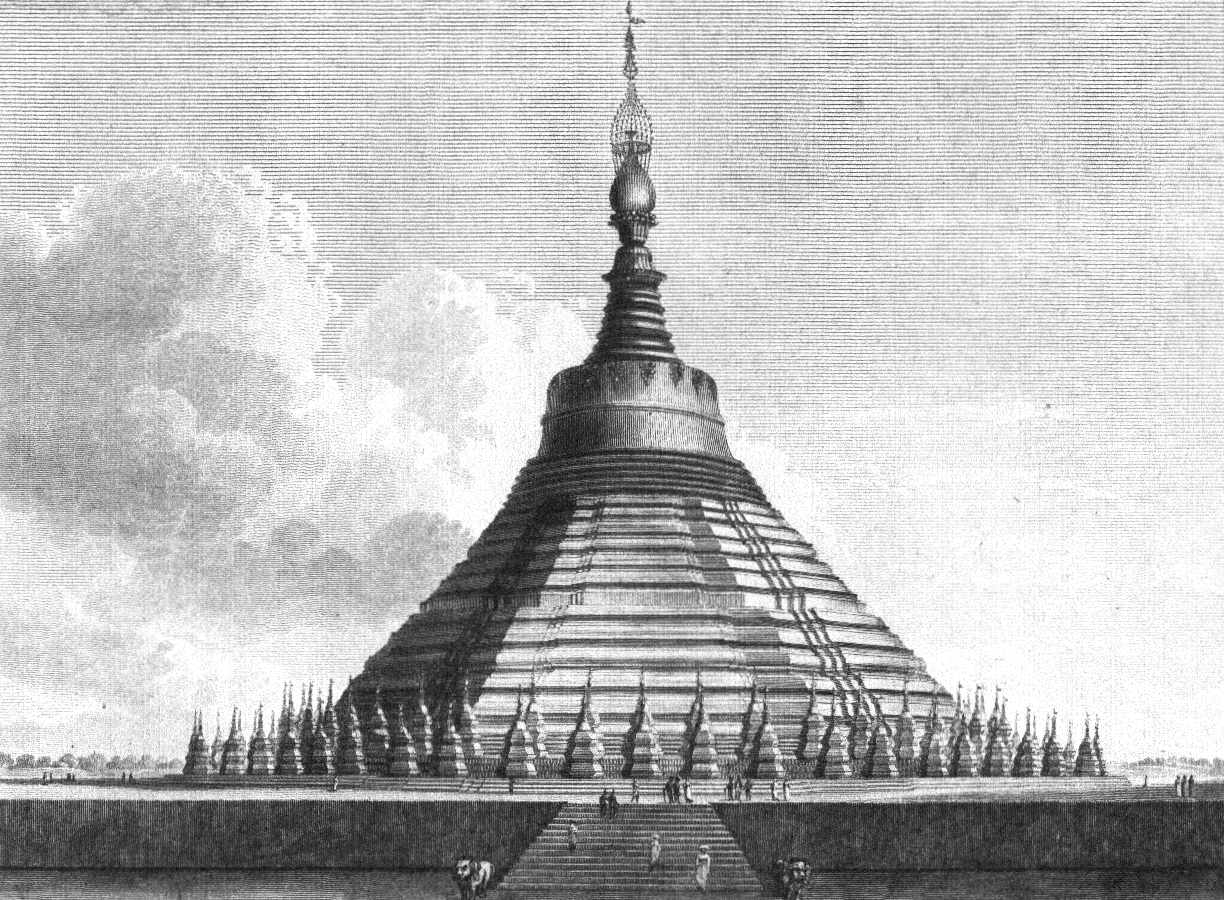
The Shwemawdaw of olden days

The king and his court chose Hanthawaddy, which on paper was the strongest kingdom of all post-Pagan kingdoms, as their first target because its inexperienced ruler King Takayutpi did not command the loyalty of his vassals in Martaban (Mottama) and the Irrawaddy delta. Moreover, Hanthawaddy's trade wealth and maritime markets made the coastal kingdom an attractive military target. Perhaps most importantly, the Toungoo court was reasonably certain that Takayutpi would not counterattack. Indeed, about two and half years earlier, (Note: (Sein Lwin Lay 2006: 129): Tabinshwehti marched to Pegu for reaching his 17th year (having turned 16). He turned 16 on 20 April 1532 (1st waning of Kason 894 ME). He likely went to Pegu in April/May 1532 before the rainy season began.) Tabinshwehti and his chosen men (eight ponnas, 40 ministers, and a company of 500 most-skillful horsemen led by Kyawhtin Nawrahta) had made an uninvited foray into the Shwemawdaw Pagoda at the outskirts of Pegu, the capital of Hanthawaddy, ostensibly for the king's ear-piercing ceremony. The audacious intrusion went unpunished. Unlike his father Binnya Ran II, whose strong 1495–96 counterattack on Toungoo taught Mingyi Nyo never to raid Hanthawaddy again, Takayutpi could not organize his kingdom's superior resources and counterattack.

==== Pegu, Irrawaddy delta and Prome (1534–1539) ====
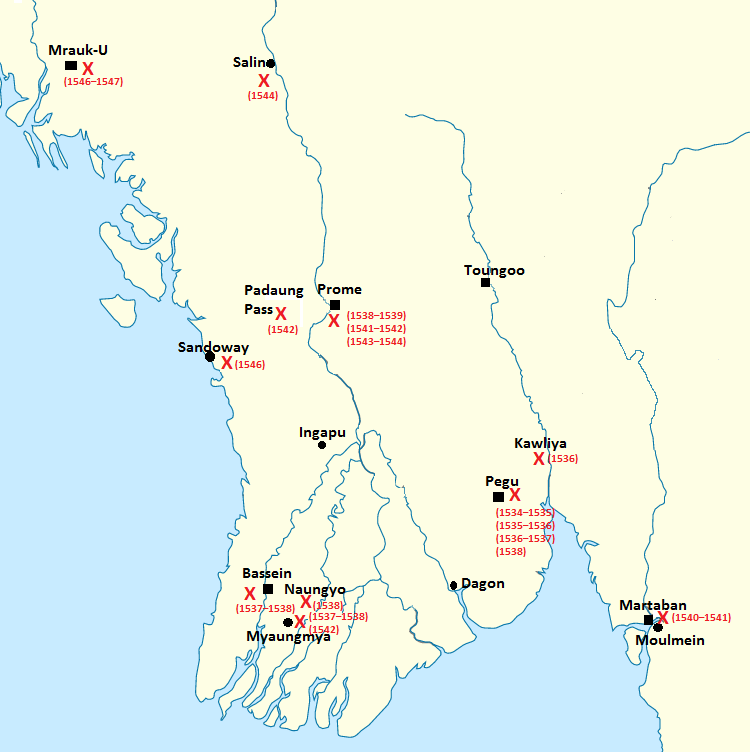
Toungoo military campaigns (1534–1547)

In the beginning, Toungoo's military maneuvers amounted to a mere raids of Hanthawaddy territory. Its initial dry-season raids in 1534–1535, 1535–1536, and 1536–1537 all failed against Pegu's fortified defenses aided by foreign mercenaries and firearms. In each campaign, Toungoo armies numbered no more than 6000 to 7000 men, a few hundred cavalry and a few dozen war elephants. More importantly, they did not yet have access to foreign troops and firearms. As expected, Takayutpi could not organize any retaliatory action. His nominal subordinates in the delta and Martaban did not send any help. Nonetheless, Pegu's defenses led by two leading ministers of the court withstood the raids.

After the repeated failures, Toungoo used a stratagem to create a split in the Hanthawaddy camp, providing misinformation about the loyalty of the ministers. Surprisingly, Takayutpi believed Toungoo's misinformation, and executed the ministers who had been his tutors since childhood and were absolutely devoted to him. Then when Toungoo launched another invasion, Takayutpi was helpless, and decided to evacuate his capital rather than fight. Toungoo forces took Pegu without firing a shot in late 1538 or early 1539. Hanthawaddy's hopes for a counterattack vanished after the Battle of Naungyo in which Gen. Kyawhtin Nawrahta's Toungoo troops, despite being vastly outnumbered, decimated Hanthawaddy armies in the delta. Tabinshwehti now bestowed Kyawhtin Nawrahta the title of Bayinnaung ("King's Elder Brother"). Toungoo forces followed up to Prome where Takayutpi had taken refuge but the siege was broken up by Prome's overlord Confederation. Takayutpi died soon after c. March 1539, and many lords from the delta came over to Tabinshwehti, who reappointed them to their posts. Moreover, Tabinshwehti now controlled much of Lower Burma's manpower and trade wealth, and gained access to Portuguese mercenaries and their firearms.

==== Martaban (1540–1541) ====
Tabinshwehti next tried to complete his control of Lower Burma. In 1540, he issued an ultimatum to Martaban, the last holdout, to surrender in exchange for amnesty. However, the offer was promptly rejected by the wealthy port's ruler Saw Binnya, who had heavily fortified his city and enlisted several Portuguese naval and land mercenaries. In November 1540, 13,000-strong Toungoo land and naval forces attacked the city. For seven months, Martaban's Portuguese-led defenses kept besiegers at bay. Finally, right before the rainy season in May 1541, Adm. Smim Payu's flotilla broke through the seven Portuguese warships guarding the harbor, and the city fell. The sack raged for three days. Tabinshwehti ordered a whole scale execution of the viceroy, his family, and all the "gallant" defenders for they had refused his prior offer of amnesty. The mass execution had the desired effect. The governors of Moulmein (Mawlaymyaing) and southern territories (present-day Mon State), abutting then Siamese frontier submitted. He appointed Saw Lagun Ein, brother-in-law of Takayutpi, as viceroy of Martaban.

=== Prome and Upper Burma (1541–1545) ===
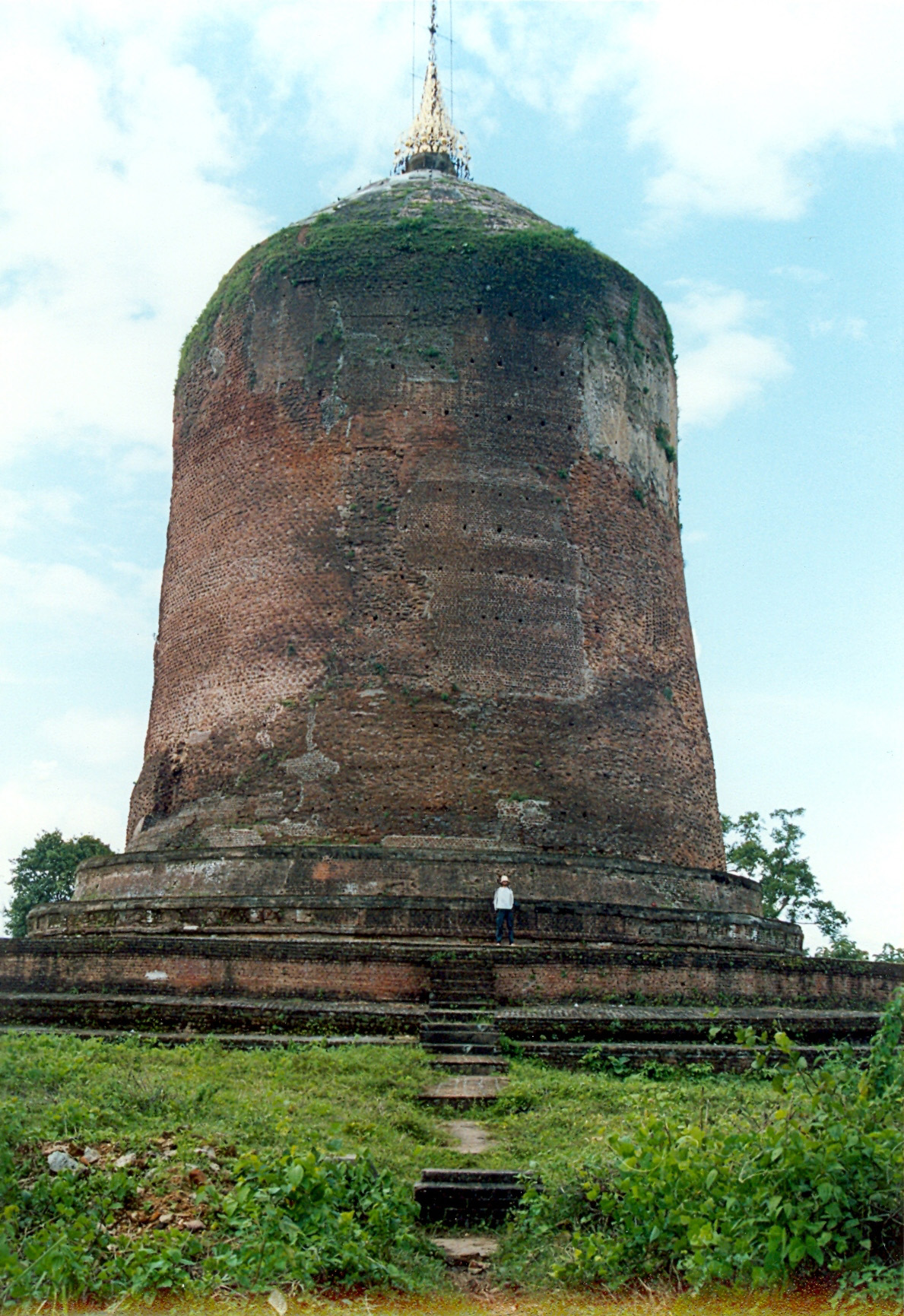
The ancient Bawbawgyi Paya near Prome.

The conquest of Martaban now gave his upstart regime complete control of Lower Burma's manpower, access to foreign firearms and maritime wealth to pay for them. Tabinshwehti would use these newfound assets for further expansion. The sudden emergence of Toungoo did not go unnoticed. Both Ava-based Confederation and Arakan now promised military help to Prome, which was the gateway to Upper Burma. Throughout the rainy season of 1541, Tabinshwehti assembled a massive combine naval and land invasion force. His 13 naval squadrons (9000 troops, nearly 1400 war boats and transport boats) were commanded by ethnic Mon lords of Lower Burma while his land armies of 8000 troops were led by himself and Bayinnaung.

Right after the Buddhist Lent, on 19 November 1541, the combined forces invaded, and by December drove Prome's forces behind the city's fortified walls. In April 1542, the Confederation armies led by King Thohanbwa came down with 16,000 troops but could not break through Toungoo lines. King Min Bin of Arakan too sent a 5,000-man army through the Padaung Pass across the Arakan Yoma range, and a 7000-man, 700-boat flotilla by the coast to break the siege. However, the Arakanese army as it came out of the pass walked into a trap, and was completely wiped out by a 6000-strong Toungoo army led by Bayinnaung. The Arakanese navy had taken Pathein and Myaungmya but retreated after hearing the news of their army's defeat. Tabinshwehti was so pleased with Bayinnaung's victory over the Arakanese army that he appointed his deputy and childhood friend heir-apparent. Prome held out for a month longer but its king Minkhaung surrendered on 19 May 1542. (Note: Portuguese explorer Fernão Mendes Pinto (Pinto 1989: 328–333) described the sack of Prome and the punishments supposedly meted out to the inhabitants in great detail. However, the British colonial scholar GE Harvey (Harvey 1925: 342) calls Pinto's reporting inconsistent and unreliable.)

In retaliation, the Confederation, now consisting of seven Shan states, led by King Hkonmaing launched a major land and naval invasion (16,000 army troops, 1000 horses, 120 elephants, 1200 naval troops, 30 large war boats, 30 fast war boats, and 50 cargo ships) on 7 December 1543. However they could not break through Toungoo defenses which included 9000 naval and 12,000 army troops, and Portuguese firearms, and were driven back after one month. Bayinnaung followed up on the retreating Confederation armies, which made a stand at the key town of Salin on the Irrawaddy. Bayinnaung took the town after a three-day battle, after which Toungoo forces occupied as far north as Pagan (Bagan).

=== Dual coronations ===
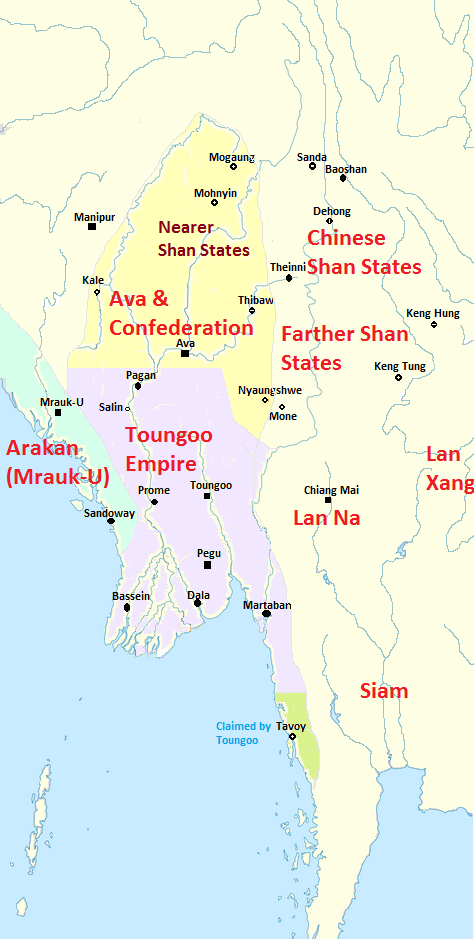
Toungoo Empire in 1545

At the ancient capital, Tabinshwehti was crowned in the full ritual and ceremony of the great kings of Pagan, and made a triumphant return to Pegu in July/August 1544. At Pegu, Tabinshwehti was again crowned in the tradition of the great kings of Hanthawaddy in 1545. He raised Khay Ma Naw, an ethnic Mon, to be his chief queen, and wore his hair in the Mon style. He appointed many ethnic Mons to the highest offices at the court and in the armed forces.

Meanwhile, Upper Burma ceased to be a concern. The ousted governor of Salin Sithu Kyawhtin did raid Salin in late 1544/early 1545 but the attack was easily repulsed. (Note: Chronicles (Hmannan Vol. 2 2003: 222–224) mention that the raid on Salin took place in year 906 ME. But since the entry on the raid came after the entry on Tabinshwehti's palace addition in Natdaw 906 ME (15 November 1544 to 13 December 1544), the raid most probably took place sometime between November 1544 and 29 March 1545, the last day of 906 ME.) King Hkonmaing died later in 1545 and the bickering between the House of Mohnyin and the House of Hsipaw broke out in full force. The rump Ava Kingdom was no longer in a position to challenge Toungoo.

=== Arakan (1545–1547) ===
Tabinshwehti selected Arakan, which provided help to Prome in 1541–42, as his next target. According to Arakanese chronicles, in October 1545, he sent in a probing force (4000 troops) into southern Arakan, which Mrauk-U forces drove back. A year later, on 28 October 1546, (Note: (Maha Yazawin Vol. 2 2006: 175) and (Hmannan Vol. 2 2003: 229) say the campaign began on Monday, 4th waxing of Tazaungmon 908 ME but the date translates to Thursday, 28 October 1546.) Tabinshwehti invaded by land and sea with a much larger force (19,000 troops, 400 horses, 60 elephants, 800 war boats, 500 armored war boats, 100 cargo boats). Toungoo forces quickly overran southern Arakan, and advanced deep into northern Arakan, reaching the environs of Launggyet, the former capital close to Mrauk-U, on 23 January 1547. The next day, Toungoo forces began their final push, driving out the Mrauk-U army from Launggyet and surrounding the heavily fortified Arakanese capital. They even breached the eastern outworks of Mrauk-U but were flooded out when Min Bin opened the sluices of the city's reservoirs. Meanwhile, Tabinshwehti received news that Siamese forces had occupied the Tavoy (Dawei) frontier up to Ye (modern southern Mon State). Unwilling to pursue a long siege, with the rear insecure, Tabinshwehti agreed to a truce with Min Bin on 30 January 1547. (Note: (Sandamala Linkara Vol. 2 1999: 45) and (Hmannan Vol. 2 2003: 238): 9th waxing of Tabodwe 908 ME = 30 January 1547) Toungoo forces began their retreat three days later, and final Toungoo regiments evacuated Thandwe three months later.

=== Siam (1547–1549) ===
Battle map of 1548–49 invasion of Siam

Back from Arakan, Tabinshwehti looked east to Siam, which had occupied what he considered his territory. His response to "Siamese incursions" would launch the centuries-long Burmese–Siamese Wars between Burma and Siam. To be sure, Siamese sources deny that Siam began the hostilities; rather, it was Burma's attempt to expand its territory eastwards taking advantage of a political crisis in Ayutthaya that started the hostilities. It is difficult to discount either side's claim since frontiers in the pre-modern period were less defined and often overlapped. Indeed, the Tavoy frontier remained a contested region well into the 18th century. The Burmese king sent a sizable force (4000 naval, 8000 land troops) led by Gen. Saw Lagun Ein of Martaban to drive out the Siamese forces from Ye and Tavoy in late 1547. (Note: The expedition likely took place in late 1547. The Hmannan chronicle (Hmannan Vol. 2 2003: 238–239) says the expedition took place in 909 ME which could be any time between 30 March 1547 and 28 March 1548. (Harvey 1925: 158) also gives only 1547. However, given that Toungoo forces fully evacuated southern Arakan only in late March 1547, Tabinshwehti likely sent the expedition c. November 1547 after the rainy season.) Saw Lagun Ein's forces defeated Siamese forces led by the governor of Kanchanaburi, and retook down to Tavoy.

Tabinshwehti was not satisfied, and planned an invasion of Siam itself. Next year, near the end of the rainy season on 14 October 1548, 12,000 strong Toungoo forces led by Tabinshwehti and Bayinnaung invaded Siam via the Three Pagodas Pass. The Burmese forces overcame Siamese defenses, and advanced to the capital city of Ayutthaya. But they could not take the heavily fortified city. One month into the siege, in January 1549, Siamese counterattacks broke the siege, and drove back the invasion force. In retreat, the Burmese tried to take Kamphaeng Phet, but it too was well defended by Portuguese mercenaries. The Burmese caught two important Siamese nobles (the heir apparent Prince Ramesuan, and Prince Thammaracha of Phitsanulok) in some open fighting, and negotiated a safe retreat in exchange for the nobles in February 1549. (Note: The war likely ended in February 1549 since per (Sein Lwin Lay 2006: 232) the king arrived back at Pegu on 1 March 1549 (3rd waxing of Late Tagu 910 ME).)

== Final year ==
The end of Tabinshwehti came soon after his return from the Siamese campaign. The king, who had always led a highly disciplined life, quickly developed a liking for wine after having introduced to it by a young Portuguese mercenary who had just entered his service (likely Diogo Soares, who eventually became his general). He became an alcoholic in such a short time that the king, who had been on constant military campaigns in every year since 1534, decided not only to forgo any new campaigns but also to hand over day-to-day governing duties to Bayinnaung. Instead, he went on hunting and drinking trips with the mercenary-turned-winemaker, whom he had given a royal handmaiden as wife. The drunken king is said not to have respected other men's wives. Desperate, ministers approached Bayinnaung to take over the throne but he refused. Bayinnaung arrested the winemaking mercenary, paid him off, set him on a ship, and sent him out of the country.

But the damage was already done. Sensing the weakness, Smim Htaw, an ex-monk and a half-brother of Takayutpi, raised a rebellion in the region of modern Yangon. Tabinshwehti asked Bayinnaung to suppress the rebellion while he went on a hunting trip to the Irrawaddy delta. It was late January / early February 1550. However, the trip was organized by Smim Sawhtut, governor of Sittaung, who planned to assassinate the king and seize the throne. The crew set up camp at Pantanaw where they spent weeks in search of a white elephant, considered extremely auspicious in Burmese tradition. After patiently waiting for nearly three months, Sawhtut finally managed to get his men to guard the king on another hunting trip. On the morning of 30 April 1550, on the king's 34th birthday, two of Sawhtut's swordsmen entered the royal tent and beheaded the king who was fast asleep. The king's severed head and body were left there, and were cremated by a local monk. His Portuguese general Soares was handed to a city where one of its citizens had been the daughter of a rich merchant whose groom and relatives he had murdered not long ago, the bride committing suicide to avoid the dishonour - Soares was lynched by its people stoning him death and his house plundered.

After Tabinshwehti's death, the empire he had built up in the last 15 years promptly fell apart. Instead of submitting to his chosen successor Bayinnaung, each major governor declared himself independent. It would take Bayinnaung another two years to restore Tabinshwehti's realm.

== Government ==
Tabinshwehti came to power at a time when the prevailing administrative model in mainland Southeast Asia was that of small solar polities, which consisted of a high king surrounded by semi-independent tributaries and autonomous viceroys. The high kings had limited administrative and manpower control and often faced rebellions, especially early in their reign. Despite having founded the largest Burmese polity since 1287, he made no effort to institute a new, more centralized administrative model. He appointed his inner circle to key locations in Upper Burma. Elsewhere, he readily reappointed local lords who made timely submissions, regardless of their ethnic background. He made no attempt to administer the Mon-speaking Lower Burma with Burman governors.

Name	Office	Appointed	Notes
Mingyi Swe	Viceroy of Toungoo	1540 (Note: (Sein Lwin Lay 2006: 175): Mingyi Swe was appointed viceroy in 902 ME, which began on 29 March 1540, prior to the start of the Martaban campaign in November 1540. It means his appointment took place between 29 March 1540 and November 1540.)	Father-in-law
Saw Lagun Ein	Viceroy of Martaban	May 1541	Brother-in-law of King Takayutpi
Smim Payu	Governor of Myaungmya	May 1541	Minister and general
Bayinnaung	Heir apparent	April 1542	Brother-in-law
Thado Dhamma Yaza I	Viceroy of Prome	19 May 1542	Father-in-law
Sokkate	Governor of Pagan	c. April 1544	Toungoo native
Minkhaung II	Viceroy of Toungoo	March 1549	Brother-in-law

In general, he made every effort to court the ethnic Mons of Lower Burma. His chief queen was a Mon, and he was crowned in Mon tradition at Pegu as the rightful heir of Pegu throne while wearing his hair in the Mon style, a gesture that "had no precedent." He appointed many ethnic Mons to the highest offices at the court and in the armed forces. The list includes Saw Lagun Ein, viceroy of Martaban; Smim Payu, governor of Myaungmya; and indeed Smim Sawhtut, governor of Sittaung and his eventual assassin. He appointed an ethnic Mon monk with the title of Maha Thanga Yaza (Maha Sangha Raja) as the chief primate of the kingdom in November 1544.

While he may have courted Mons for he depended on Lower Burma's manpower and maritime wealth to fund his wars, history shows he truly trusted his ethnic Mon inner circle up to his gruesome death. He needed and prized loyal local lords for governing since he spent much of his reign (1534–1549) on military campaigns. Local lords in turn were loyal to him, not to the highly devolved central administration. Not surprisingly, the kingdom he had built up purely through military conquests fell apart right after his death. Indeed, the much greater empire of Bayinnaung, which too was built on sheer military conquests, would see the same fate within the decade following the conqueror's death in 1581. The weak decentralized administration era would continue until the early 17th century when Restored Toungoo kings first introduced administrative reforms to centralize power.

== Legacy ==
=== Empire builder ===
Tabinshwehti's legacy looms large. Although he did not implement any administrative reforms, his military conquests assembled the largest kingdom in Burma since the fall of Pagan in 1287. His administratively fragile kingdom proved to be the impetus for the eventual reunification of the entire country under Bayinnaung, even if the core of the reunified Burmese state would stabilize only in the early 17th century. Though he may initially have been urged on by his court, it was ultimately his decision to start a war with a wealthier but poorly led neighbor, and to persist until the victory over Hanthawaddy was achieved. He quickly built on the success by combining his kingdom's "more martial tradition" with the maritime wealth and manpower of Lower Burma, which enabled him to acquire foreign mercenaries and firearms. This fortuitous combination would ultimately lead to his founding of the Toungoo Empire. His success in breaking out of an increasingly narrow dry zone not only saved the only remaining ethnic Burman-led kingdom from extinction but also ensured the continued spread of Burmese culture and language in the Irrawaddy valley. (Note: (Lieberman 2003: 155–164): The Burmese language and culture were already dominant in the 1530s in Upper Burma. Both Ava and Prome, both vassals of the Confederation of Shan States, remained Burmese-speaking and followed Burmese customs in "an increasingly Burman basin".)

However, not all his legacies endured. Tabinshwehti went to great lengths to ensure that the rise of his regime did not come at the expense of Lower Burma's ethnic Mon culture and language. According to the historian Victor Lieberman, had later Toungoo rulers continued Tabinshwehti's policy of "Mon–Burman synthesis", ethnic relations within the Irrawaddy valley "might have moved along a very different path". Lieberman calls Tabinshwehti's death, "one of the great turning points of mainland [Southeast Asia] history".

While Tabinshwehti's considerable achievements are overshadowed by Bayinnaung's overwhelming achievements, the historian Htin Aung writes that: "it would be unfair to ignore Tabinshwehti when considering the achievements of Bayinnaung... without Tabinshwehti, there could have been no Bayinnaung."

=== Popular culture ===
Tabinshwehti is still remembered as a brave king and empire builder in popular culture, albeit generally in a secondary role in the stories of his much more celebrated successor Bayinnaung. The exploits of Tabinshwehti and Bayinnaung—many of which are legends—are still faithfully retold in books and songs. One of the first modern novels published in the Burmese language in the early 20th century was a fictional recreation of his reign named Tabinshwehti Wuttu Daw Gyi.

The king's invasion of Siam was an important part of the plot in the 2001 Thai film The Legend of Suriyothai. Chatrichalerm Yukol, the director, screenwriter, and producer, portrayed him with a white-painted face and flamboyant costumes, inspired by Japanese writer Yukio Mishima, to emphasize a ruthless, eccentric, and transgender characterization as a way of adding dramatic colour to the role. He also described him as "like the Alexander the Great of Asia".

In the video game Age of Empires II HD: Rise of the Rajas, Tabinshwehti featured as an elephant archer.

=== Religion ===
The Tabinshwehti nat is one of the 37 nats (spirits) worshiped in Myanmar. He is portrayed sitting cross-legged on a throne in full regalia, with two swords in his left hand and right hands above his knee.

=== Commemorations ===
Tabinshwehti is one of the more well known kings in Myanmar.

- Tabinshwehti Road, Yangon: A road in Yangon
- UMS Tabinshwehti: A Myanmar Navy corvette

== Ancestry ==
The three main chronicles—the Maha Yazawin (1724), Yazawin Thit (1798), and Hmannan Yazawin (1832)—provide King Tabinshwehti's paternal lineage quite extensively. On his maternal side, the chronicles say that she was a daughter of Thura Kyawkhaung. The chronicles, however, diverge on the details regarding his paternal line.

Historian Sein Lwin Lay's 1968 analysis (Note: According to Sein Lwin Lay, several historical sources about the ancestry of Mingyi Nyo and Tabinshwehti provide different, often conflicting information. His analysis considered the Maha Yazawin, Hmannan, and the Min Taya Shwe-Hti Eigyin (a chronicle in verse), and the paper and parabaik versions of the Toungoo Yazawin. He also provided the 20th stanza of the eigyin, chronicle in verse.) on the ancestry of King Mingyi Nyo essentially follows the Maha Yazawin's account. One key difference is that he changed Thettawshay's father to King Kyawswa I of Pinya. He did not provide an explanation as to how he arrived at this specific list, however. (Note: Sein Lwin Lay's analysis does not explain why it: Identifies Kyawswa I of Pinya as Thettawshay's father, and not grandfather as in the Yazawin Thit and Hmannan chronicles. One possible reason may be to maintain the seven generations between Kyawswa I of Pinya and Mingyi Nyo as in the Yazawin Thit and Hmannan.; Follows the Maha Yazawin for Thettawshay's descendants down to Mingyi Nyo.)

The following table lists the accounts of Mingyi Nyo's patrilineal ancestors as presented in the three chronicles, and Sein Lwin Lay's analysis.

Generation	Maha Yazawin (1724)	Yazawin Thit (1798)	Hmannan Yazawin (1832)	(Sein Lwin Lay 1968)
5x patrilineal great grandparents	Shwe Nan Shin of Myinsaing	Kyawswa I +; Mway Medaw of Pinya	Kyawswa I +; Mway Medaw of Pinya	Kyawswa I
4x patrilineal great grandparents	Thettawshay of Sikyay	Min Letwe of Sikyay	Min Letwe of Sikyay	Thettawshay of Sikyay
3x patrilineal great grandparents	Thray Waduna of Pinya	Thettawshay of Sikyay +; daughter of Shwe Nan Shin of Myinsaing	Thettawshay of Sikyay +; Saw Min Hla, daughter of Min Letya of Nyaungyan	Thray Waduna of Pinya
2x patrilineal great grandparents	Thray Sithu	Maha Thinkhaya I +; unnamed 2nd wife	Maha Thinkhaya I +; Shwe Pan, daughter of Yazathu of Talok	Thray Sithu
Patrilineal great grandparents	Thray Thinkhaya	Maha Thinkhaya II	Maha Thinkhaya II +; daughter of Saw Hnaung of Mekkhaya	Thray Thinkhaya
Paternal grandparents	Maha Thinkhaya of Toungoo + Min Hla Nyet			
Father	Mingyi Nyo			
	Tabinshwehti			

Family tree of King Tabinshwehti per the Hmannan Yazawin (Note: See (Hmannan Vol. 2 2003: 172–173) for Mingyi Nyo's paternal and maternal lines.)

Thihathu of Pinya; 1265–1325; r. 1310–1325	Mi Saw U of Pagan	Kyawswa of Pagan; 1260–1299; r. 1289–1297	Saw Soe	Thihathu of Prome; d. 1288	Atula Dewi
Kyawswa I of Pinya; 1299–1350; r. 1344–1350	Uzana I of Pinya; 1298–1356; r. 1325–1340	Min Shin Saw; c. 1280s–1350s	Shin Myat Hla; c. 1288–1350s
Min Letwe; c. 1320s–c. 1386	Sithu Min Oo; c. 1310s–c. 1380s?	Swa Saw Ke of Ava; 1330–1400; r. 1367–1400
Thettawshay; c. 1340s–c. 1380s	Sithu Thanbawa; 1360s–1390s?	Minkhaung I of Ava; 1373–1421; r. 1400–1421	Tarabya I of Pakhan; c. 1360s–c. 1433
Maha Thinkhaya I	Sithu of Paukmyaing; 1380s–?	Minye Kyawswa; 1391–1415	Saw Min Hla; 1390s–?
Maha Thinkhaya II	Sithu Kyawhtin of Toungoo; 1410s–1481	Min Hla Htut; c. 1410s–c. 1480s
Maha Thinkhaya III	Min Hla Nyet	Thura Kyawkhaung
Mingyi Nyo; 1459–1530; r. 1510–1530	Yaza Dewi; c. 1500–?
Tabinshwehti; 1516–1550; r. 1530–1550

== Bibliography ==
- Fernquest, Jon (Autumn 2005). "Min-gyi-nyo, the Shan Invasions of Ava (1524–27), and the Beginnings of Expansionary Warfare in Toungoo Burma: 1486–1539" (PDF). SOAS Bulletin of Burma Research. 3 (2). Archived from the original (PDF) on 3 March 2016.
- Harvey, G. E. (1925). History of Burma: From the Earliest Times to 10 March 1824. London: Frank Cass & Co. Ltd.
- Htin Aung, Maung (1967). A History of Burma. New York and London: Cambridge University Press.
- Kala, U (2006) [1724]. Maha Yazawin (in Burmese). Vol. 1–3 (4th printing ed.). Yangon: Ya-Pyei Publishing.
- Lieberman, Victor B. (2003). Strange Parallels: Southeast Asia in Global Context, c. 800–1830, volume 1, Integration on the Mainland. Cambridge University Press. ISBN 978-0-521-80496-7.
- Maha Sithu (2012) [1798]. Myint Swe; Kyaw Win; Thein Hlaing (eds.). Yazawin Thit (in Burmese). Vol. 1–3 (2nd printing ed.). Yangon: Ya-Pyei Publishing.
- Myint-U, Thant (2006). The River of Lost Footsteps—Histories of Burma. Farrar, Straus and Giroux. ISBN 978-0-374-16342-6.
- Phayre, Lt. Gen. Sir Arthur P. (1967) [1883]. History of Burma. London: Susil Gupta.
- Pinto, Fernão Mendes (1980) [1614]. Rebecca. D. Catz (ed.). The travels of Mendes Pinto. Chicago: University of Chicago Press.
- Royal Historical Commission of Burma (2003) [1832]. Hmannan Yazawin (in Burmese). Vol. 1–3. Yangon: Ministry of Information, Myanmar.
- Sandamala Linkara, Ashin (1997–1999) [1931]. Rakhine Razawin Thit (in Burmese). Vol. 1–2. Yangon: Tetlan Sarpay.
- Sein Lwin Lay, Kahtika U (2006) [1968]. Mintaya Shwe Hti and Bayinnaung: Ketumadi Taungoo Yazawin (in Burmese) (2nd printing ed.). Yangon: Yan Aung Sarpay.
- Thaw Kaung, U (2010). Aspects of Myanmar History and Culture. Yangon: Gangaw Myaing.

Tabinshwehti Toungoo Dynasty Born: 16 April 1516 Died: 30 April 1550
Regnal titles
Preceded by Mingyi Nyo	King of Burma; 24 November 1530 – 30 April 1550	Succeeded by Bayinnaung
Preceded by Mingyi Nyo	King of Toungoo; 24 November 1530 – 1540	Succeeded by Mingyi Swe as Viceroy of Toungoo
Royal titles
New title	Heir apparent of Toungoo; 16 April 1516 – 24 November 1530	Succeeded by Bayinnaung
