= Mingyi Nyo =

Mingyi Nyo; မင်းကြီးညို
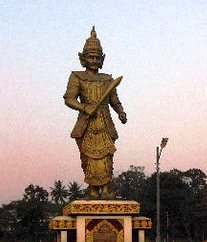
- Statue of Mingyi Nyo in Taungoo

King of Toungoo
- Reign: 16 October 1510 – 24 November 1530
- Coronation: 11 April 1511
- Predecessor: Narapati II (as King of Ava)
- Successor: Tabinshwehti

Viceroy of Toungoo
- Reign: c. April 1485 – 16 October 1510
- Coronation: 11 November 1491
- Predecessor: Min Sithu
- Successor: Mingyi Swe
- Born: c. July 1459; Wednesday, 821 ME; Ava (Inwa)?
- Died: 24 November 1530 (aged 71); 5th waxing of Nadaw 892 ME; Toungoo (Taungoo)
- Burial: Toungoo
- Consort: Soe Min Hteik-Tin; Thiri Maha Sanda Dewi; Yadana Dewi; Maha Dewi; Yaza Dewi
- Issue: Tabinshwehti; Atula Thiri
Regnal name
- Mahāsīrijeyyasūra; မဟာသီရိဇေယျသူရ
- House: Toungoo
- Father: Maha Thinkhaya
- Mother: Min Hla Nyet
- Religion: Theravada Buddhism

Mingyi Nyo (Burmese: မင်းကြီးညို; pronounced [mɪ́ɰ̃dʑíɲò]; also spelled Minkyi Nyo; 1459–1530), was the founder of the Toungoo dynasty of Burma (Myanmar). Under his 45-year leadership (1485–1530), Toungoo (Taungoo), grew from a remote backwater vassal state of Ava Kingdom to a small but stable independent kingdom. In 1510, he declared Toungoo's independence from its nominal overlord Ava. He skillfully kept his small kingdom out of the chaotic warfare plaguing Upper Burma. Toungoo's stability continued to attract refugees from Ava fleeing the repeated raids of Ava by the Confederation of Shan States (1490s–1527). Nyo left a stable, confident kingdom that enabled his successor Tabinshwehti to contemplate taking on larger kingdoms on his way to founding the Toungoo Empire.

== Early life ==
Mingyi Nyo was born to Maha Thinkhaya and Min Hla Nyet. His father was a descendant of Kyawswa I of Pinya, who himself was a descendant of kings Narathihapate of Pagan and Thihathu of Pinya. His mother was a daughter of Viceroy Sithu Kyawhtin of Toungoo, a descendant of King Swa Saw Ke.

Nyo was most likely born in Ava (Inwa) as his maternal grandfather Sithu Kyawhtin did not become viceroy until 1470, and prior to 1470 served at King Thihathura I's court at Ava. He was born in 1459. (Note: The chronicles are inconsistent with regard to his birth year. (Hmannan Vol. 2 2003: 182) says he died at age 71 (in his 72nd year) on 5th waxing of Nadaw 892 ME (24 November 1530), having reigned for 46 years. It means he was born before 5th waxing of Nadaw 821 ME (30 November 1459), and came to power in 1484. However this is inconsistent with their own reporting (Hmannan Vol. 2 2003: 172) which says he came to power in 847 ME (1485/1486) at age 25 (26th year), meaning he was born in 822 ME (1460/1461).) He was likely about eleven or twelve years old when his entire family moved to Toungoo with Sithu Kyawhtin's appointment as viceroy. After Sithu Kyawhtin's death in 1481, his eldest son Min Sithu inherited the viceroyship. (The viceroyships in that era were hereditary, and were a primary cause of endemic rebellions that plagued Ava. The Restored Toungoo kings (1599–1752) would later eliminate the hereditary rights of viceroys.) Nyo wanted to marry his first cousin, Soe Min Hteik-Tin. But because his uncle Min Sithu repeatedly rejected Nyo's numerous requests, he murdered his uncle, took his cousin as wife. He seized power in c. April 1485. (Note: Both standard chronicles Maha Yazawin (Maha Yazawin Vol. 2 2006: 129) and Hmannan Yazawin (Maha Yazawin Vol. 2 2003: 172) report that he came to power in 847 ME (29 March 1485 to 28 March 1486). Because both chronicles also report that he reigned for about 46 years, he likely came to power in early 847 ME (c. April 1485).)

== Reign ==
After assassinating his uncle and seizing the viceroyship, Nyo sent a present of two young elephants to King Minkhaung II of Ava. In normal times, killing a governor was a serious crime. But Minkhaung II was facing a serious rebellion nearer to Ava (by his brother Minye Kyawswa of Yamethin)–Prome farther south had already revolted in 1482–did not want another rebellion. He gave Nyo recognition as governor of Toungoo, and solicited Toungoo's help in the rebellions. Nyo also received recognition from Hanthawaddy and Lan Na, and received propitiatory tribute from the Karenni.

=== Loyal vassal of Ava (1485–1501) ===
Mingyi Nyo, now styled as Thiri Zeya Thura, eagerly assisted Ava in its fight against Yamethin. (His grandfather Sithu Kyawhtin died in 1481 fighting against the Yamethin rebels.) Even with Toungoo's help, the Yamethin rebellion was intractable and remained a stalemate. (It would remain so until Minye Kyawswa's death in August 1500). With Ava chiefly preoccupied by Yamethin, Nyo grew more confident and on 11 November 1491 (Note: (Sein Lwin Lay 2006: 57): Friday, 12th waxing of Nadaw 853 ME = 11 November 1491) built a new fortified city called Dwayawaddy (still near Toungoo), at the estuary of the rivers Kabaung and Paunglaung.

Nyo soon tested his power by meddling into the accession affairs of Hanthawaddy kingdom, the much larger kingdom to the south. In 1491–1492, Hanthawaddy's new king Binnya Ran II came to power by killing off all the royal offspring. Taking advantage of the chaos in the southern kingdom, Nyo sent a probing raid into the territory of Hanthawaddy without Minkhaung II's permission. At Kaungbya, he killed its Shan governor in single combat by jumping onto his elephant and cutting him down. Hanthawaddy's response was swift. In late 1495, Binnya Ran II sent in a combined land and naval force of 16,000, which ultimately laid siege to the new built Dwayawaddy itself. Toungoo barely survived the siege but Nyo would not make war against the larger neighbor for the remainder of his life.

Minkhaung II nonetheless upgraded Nyo's title to Maha Thiri Zeya Thura for surviving the Hanthawaddy attack (although it was Nyo who without his permission provoked the attack). Minkhaung had little choice but to retain Nyo as he was one of the remaining loyal vassals of Ava. In return, Toungoo participated Ava's campaigns against Yamethin and Prome for the remainder of the 1490s.

=== Nominal vassal of Ava (1501–1510) ===
By the turn of the 16th century, Nyo's Toungoo was equally powerful as its nominal overlord Ava. Nyo, though still loyal to Minkhaung, nonetheless accepted about a thousand Yamethin rebels, who fled to Toungoo after their leader died in August 1500. When Minkhaung II also died in April 1501, Nyo was ready to assert his independence. He readily gave shelter to those who attempted on the life of the new king Shwenankyawshin.

Despite Nyo's thinly veiled insurrection, the new king wanted to retain Toungoo's loyalty as he faced a new even more pressing problem of Shan raids from the north. In 1502, he bribed Nyo by giving him his first cousin Min Hla Htut (styled as Thiri Maha Sanda Dewi) for marriage and the Kyaukse granary, the most valuable region in Upper Burma. Nyo accepted the region, and deported much of the population between Kyaukse and Toungoo–Yamethin, Meiktila, etc.–to his capital. But not only did he not provide any help to Ava but he actively joined in the rebellions by the princes of Nyaungyan and Prome. Together with the rebel forces, he raided far north as Sale. In 1509, Taungdwingyi also came under his authority.

=== Independence from Ava (1510–1530) ===
In 1510, he founded Ketumati, the present-day Toungoo, complete with fortified walls. On 16 October 1510 (Full moon of Tazaungmon 872 ME) (Note: Chronicles (Sein Lwin Lay 2006: 70) give the foundation date as Tuesday, Full Moon of Tazaungmon 872 ME, which actually translates to Wednesday, 16 October 1510.) Nyo formally announced Toungoo's independence. At his coronation ceremony on 11 April 1511, he was crowned king with the regnal title of Maha Thiri Zeya Thura Dhamma Yaza Dipadi. Ava was in no position to contest the decision, as it had more pressing problems with the Shan raids from the north. At any rate, the announcement was a mere formality. Toungoo had been de facto independent since 1501. After the formal declaration of independence, Nyo largely stayed out of the endemic warfare between Ava and the Confederation of Shan States that consumed much of Upper Burma between 1501 and 1527. When Ava was on the ropes, he did move up his forward base to Yamethin and Taungdwingyi, former Ava territories, on 15 March 1523 (New Moon of Tabaung 884 ME). Ava responded by unsuccessfully laying siege to Toungoo for a month in April–May 1525. Otherwise, the kingdom was largely peaceful.

When the Confederation finally defeated Ava in March 1527, Nyo deliberately devastated the countryside between Ava and Toungoo, filling the wells and breaking down the channels in the hope of making an impassable belt between Toungoo and the Confederation. The Burmese bureaucracy and population at Ava largely fled to Toungoo.

Mingyi Nyo died on 24 November 1530, and was succeeded by his son Tabinshweti.

== Legacy ==
Mingyi Nyo's 45-year reign was one of the few stable regimes in Upper Burma in the era. Toungoo's remote location (nestled between the Bago Yoma mountain range and the Karen Hill country, and cut off from the main Irrawaddy River valley) proved a vital advantage. It took effort to march to Toungoo. The stability of his kingdom attracted many refugees, and the flow of refugees accelerated after Ava's fall. The increased manpower allowed Tabinshwehti and his deputy Bayinnaung to imagine an offensive war against larger kingdoms. Tabinshwehti's improbable victory over Hanthawaddy had its beginnings in Mingyi Nyo's long stable rule.

== Ancestry ==
The three main chronicles—the Maha Yazawin (1724), Yazawin Thit (1798), and Hmannan Yazawin (1832)—provide King Mingyi Nyo's paternal and maternal lineages. The chronicles, however, diverge on the details regarding his paternal line.

Historian Sein Lwin Lay's 1968 analysis (Note: According to Sein Lwin Lay, several historical sources about the ancestry of Mingyi Nyo and Tabinshwehti provide different, often conflicting information. His analysis considered the Maha Yazawin, Hmannan, and the Min Taya Shwe-Hti Eigyin (a chronicle in verse), and the paper and parabaik versions of the Toungoo Yazawin. He also provided the 20th stanza of the eigyin, chronicle in verse.) on the ancestry of King Mingyi Nyo essentially follows the Maha Yazawin's account. One key difference is that he changed Thettawshay's father to King Kyawswa I of Pinya. He did not provide an explanation as to how he arrived at this specific list, however. (Note: Sein Lwin Lay's analysis does not explain why it: Identifies Kyawswa I of Pinya as Thettawshay's father, and not grandfather as in the Yazawin Thit and Hmannan chronicles. One possible reason may be to maintain the seven generations between Kyawswa I of Pinya and Mingyi Nyo as in the Yazawin Thit and Hmannan.; Follows the Maha Yazawin for Thettawshay's descendants down to Mingyi Nyo.)

The following table lists the accounts of Mingyi Nyo's patrilineal ancestors as presented in the three chronicles, and Sein Lwin Lay's analysis.

Generation	Maha Yazawin (1724)	Yazawin Thit (1798)	Hmannan Yazawin (1832)	(Sein Lwin Lay 1968)
4x patrilineal great grandparents	Shwe Nan Shin of Myinsaing	Kyawswa I +; Mway Medaw of Pinya	Kyawswa I +; Mway Medaw of Pinya	Kyawswa I
3x patrilineal great grandparents	Thettawshay of Sikyay	Min Letwe of Sikyay	Min Letwe of Sikyay	Thettawshay of Sikyay
2x patrilineal great grandparents	Thray Waduna of Pinya	Thettawshay of Sikyay +; daughter of Shwe Nan Shin of Myinsaing	Thettawshay of Sikyay +; Saw Min Hla, daughter of Min Letya of Nyaungyan	Thray Waduna of Pinya
Patrilineal great grandparents	Thray Sithu	Maha Thinkhaya I +; unnamed 2nd wife	Maha Thinkhaya I +; Shwe Pan, daughter of Yazathu of Talok	Thray Sithu
Patrilineal grandparents	Thray Thinkhaya	Maha Thinkhaya II	Maha Thinkhaya II +; daughter of Saw Hnaung of Mekkhaya	Thray Thinkhaya
Father	Maha Thinkhaya	Maha Thinkhaya III	Maha Thinkhaya III	Maha Thinkhaya
	Mingyi Nyo			

The Maha Yazawin identifies Nyo as a sixth-generation descendant of Gov. Shwe Nan Shin of Myinsaing. The Yazawin Thit largely rejects the Maha Yazawin account but retains Shwe Nan Shin as an ancestor. The Hmannan Yazawin accepts most of the Yazawin Thit version but makes two specific exceptions: The Hmannan removes Shwe Nan Shin from the lineage, and identifies Nyo's patrilineal great grandmother as Shwe Pan, daughter of Yazathu.

Ancestry of King Mingyi Nyo per the Hmannan Yazawin (Note: See (Hmannan Vol. 2 2003: 172–173) for the king's paternal and maternal lines.; See (Hmannan Vol. 1 2003: 436) for Yazathura's ancestry; the children of Min Letya and Chit Ke: Maha, Saw Min Hla and Saw Pu. Chit Ke herself was a sister of Min Pale of Paukmyaing.; (Hmannan Vol. 1 2003: 436) says Yazathura was married to Princess Min Padamya, daughter of King Swa Saw Ke. Thus, Nyo's great grandmother Shwe Pan may be a daughter of Padamya or some other wife of Yazathura.)

32. Min Letwe of Sikyay
16. Thettawshay of Sikyay
8. Maha Thinkhaya I
34. Min Letya of Nyaungyan
17. Saw Min Hla of Nyaungyan
35. Chit Ke
4. Maha Thinkhaya II
36. Maha
18. Yazathu of Talok
37. Saw Min Hla of Pinya
9. Min Shwe Pan
2. Maha Thinkhaya of Toungoo
10. Saw Hnaung of Mekkhaya
5. unnamed
1. Mingyi Nyo
48. Sithu Min Oo
24. Sithu Thanbawa
49. Minkhaung Medaw
12. Sithu of Paukmyaing
6. Sithu Kyawhtin of Toungoo
3. Min Hla Nyet of Toungoo
56. Swa Saw Ke
28. Minkhaung I
57. Saw Beza
14. Minye Kyawswa
58. Tho Ngan Bwa
29. Shin Mi-Nauk
7. Min Hla Htut of Pyakaung
30. Tarabya I of Pakhan
15. Saw Min Hla of Pakhan

== Bibliography ==
- Fernquest, Jon (Autumn 2005). "Min-gyi-nyo, the Shan Invasions of Ava (1524–27), and the Beginnings of Expansionary Warfare in Toungoo Burma: 1486–1539" (PDF). SOAS Bulletin of Burma Research. 3 (2).
- Harvey, G.E. (1925). History of Burma. London: Frank Cass & Co. Ltd.
- Kala, U (2006) [1724]. Maha Yazawin (in Burmese). Vol. 1–3 (4th printing ed.). Yangon: Ya-Pyei Publishing.
- Maha Sithu (2012) [1798]. Kyaw Win; Thein Hlaing (eds.). Yazawin Thit (in Burmese). Vol. 1–3 (2nd ed.). Yangon: Ya-Pyei Publishing.
- Royal Historical Commission of Burma (2003) [1832]. Hmannan Yazawin (in Burmese). Vol. 1–3. Yangon: Ministry of Information, Myanmar.
- Sein Lwin Lay, Kahtika U (2006) [1968]. Mintaya Shwe Hti and Bayinnaung: Ketumadi Taungoo Yazawin (in Burmese) (2nd printing ed.). Yangon: Yan Aung Sarpay.

Mingyi Nyo Toungoo dynasty Born: c. July 1459 Died: 24 November 1530
Regnal titles
New title	King of Toungoo; 16 October 1510 – 24 November 1530	Succeeded by Tabinshwehti
Royal titles
Preceded by Min Sithu	Viceroy of Toungoo c. April 1485 – 16 October 1510	Succeeded by Mingyi Swe
