= Thray Waduna of Pinya =

Thray Waduna; သရေ ဝဎုနာ

Governor of Pinya
- Reign: c. 1380s – 1390s or later
- Predecessor: Shin Saw Gyi (Note: According to the Yazawin Thit chronicle, King Swa Saw Ke gave Pinya in fief ("ကံကျွေး ပေးတော်မူ") to his queen of the Northern Palace, Shin Saw Gyi c. March 1368 (Tabaung 729 ME), soon after his accession. This typically means she was a myosa grade governor. However, given that Pinya was only about 8 km south of Ava (Inwa), the queen may have been a titular myosa, and may not have "governed" her fief.; Thray Waduna did not become governor of Pinya because Shin Saw Gyi had died. Per a contemporary inscription dated 13 June 1398 (Wednesday, 12th waxing of Waso 760 ME), she had graduated to become the chief queen consort by then.)
- Successor: ?
- Monarch: Swa Saw Ke
- Born: ? Ava Kingdom
- Died: Ava Kingdom
- Issue: Thray Sithu
- Father: Thettawshay of Myinsaing

Thray Waduna (Burmese: သရေ ဝဎုနာ, pronounced [θəɹè wədṵnà]) was governor of Pinya in the late 14th and perhaps early 15th centuries. He participated in the Ava–Hanthawaddy War (1385–1391). He is considered a possible patrilineal ancestor of King Mingyi Nyo, the founder of the Toungoo Dynasty.

== Ancestry and descendants ==
The royal chronicles provide conflicting accounts of Thray Waduna's ancestry and descendants.

- The Maha Yazawin chronicle (1724) says that Thray Waduna was a son of Thettawshay, who in turn was a son of Shwe Nan Shin of Myinsaing. The chronicle identifies King Mingyi Nyo as Thray Waduna's two times great-grandson.
- The Yazawin Thit chronicle (1798) does not identify Thray Waduna as an ancestor of Mingyi Nyo. It maintains that Thettawshay was an ancestor of Mingyi Nyo but argues that he was Shwe Nan Shin's son-in-law, not his son. The chronicle names Thettawshay's father as Min Letwe of Sikyay.
- The Hmannan Yazawin chronicle (1832) accepts most of the Yazawin Thit's corrections but names another wife of Thettawshay as Mingyi Nyo's ancestor. (Note: The Yazawin Thit says Thettawshay and the daughter of Shwe Nan Shin had a son named Maha Thinkhaya, who was a paternal great grandfather of Mingyi Nyo.; The Hmannan accepts that Maha Thinkhaya was a great grandfather of Mingyi Nyo but names another wife of Thettawshay, Saw Min Hla as the mother.)

Historians recognize the discrepancies with the various chronicle narratives. Historian Sein Lwin Lay's 1968 analysis on the ancestry of kings Mingyi Nyo and Tabinshwehti lists Thray Waduna as a patrilineal ancestor. (Note: According to Sein Lwin Lay, several historical sources about the ancestry of Mingyi Nyo and Tabinshwehti provide different, often conflicting information. His analysis considered the Maha Yazawin, Hmannan, and the Min Taya Shwe-Hti Eigyin, and the paper and parabaik versions of the Toungoo Yazawin. Although he largely accepted the Maha Yazawin's paternal line, he partially accepted Hmannan's line that Thray Waduna's father Thettawshay was a descendant of King Kyawswa I of Pinya. In the Hmannan, Thettawshay was a grandson of King Kyawswa I while in Sein Lwin Lay's list, he was a son of the king. Sein Lwin Lay did not explain how he arrived at his list.) The editors of the 2012 edition of the Yazawin Thit chronicle also reviewed the sources but offered no definitive conclusion. (Note: See (Yazawin Thit Vol. 1 2012: 343, footnote 1; 343–344, footnote 4). The editors provide the lists by the Maha Yazawin, the Yazawin Thit, the Hmannan and the Min Taya Shwe-Hti Eigyin.)

== Military service ==
The following is a list of campaigns the governor participated in according to the royal chronicles.

| Campaign | Duration | Troops commanded (Note: Chronicle reported troop levels reduced by an order of magnitude per (Harvey 1925: 333–336)) | Notes |
|---|---|---|---|
| Ava–Hanthawaddy War (1385–1391) | 1385–1386 | 1 regiment | Served in the 2nd Army (9 regiments, 6000 infantry, 500 cavalry, 20 elephants) under the command of Prince Min Swe |
| Ava–Hanthawaddy War (1385–1391) | 1386–1387 | 1 regiment (1000 troops) | Commanded one of the two vanguard regiments that captured Hmawbi before being driven back a few months later |
| Ava–Hanthawaddy War (1385–1391) | 1390–1391 | 1 regiment (1000 troops) | Part of the invasion army led by Crown Prince Tarabya that invaded the Sittaung front |

== Bibliography ==
- Kala, U (2006) [1724]. Maha Yazawin (in Burmese). Vol. 1–3 (4th printing ed.). Yangon: Ya-Pyei Publishing.
- Maha Sithu (2012) [1798]. Myint Swe (1st ed.); Kyaw Win; Thein Hlaing (eds.). Yazawin Thit (in Burmese). Vol. 1–3 (2nd ed.). Yangon: Ya-Pyei Publishing.
- Royal Historical Commission of Burma (2003) [1832]. Hmannan Yazawin (in Burmese). Vol. 1–3. Yangon: Ministry of Information, Myanmar.
- Sein Lwin Lay, Kahtika U (2006) [1968]. Mintaya Shwe Hti and Bayinnaung: Ketumadi Taungoo Yazawin (in Burmese) (2nd printing ed.). Yangon: Yan Aung Sarpay.
- Tun Nyein, U; Taw Sein Ko; Emanuel Forchhammer (1899). Inscriptions of Pagan, Pinya and Ava: Translation, with Notes. Archaeological Survey of India.

Thray Waduna of Pinya Ava Died: ?
| Preceded by Shin Saw Gyi | Governor of Pinya; 1380s – 1390s or later | Succeeded by ? |
