= Thiri Maha Sanda Dewi of Toungoo =

Thiri Maha Sanda Dewi သီရိမဟာစန္ဒာဒေဝီ

Queen of the Northern Palace
- Tenure: 16 October 1510 – 24 November 1530
- Predecessor: New office
- Successor: Khin Myat
- Born: c. 1480; Salin
- Died: Toungoo
- Spouse: Mingyi Nyo
- Issue: none
- House: Toungoo
- Father: Thado Dhamma Yaza of Salin
- Mother: Sagaing Minthami
- Religion: Theravada Buddhism

Thiri Maha Sanda Dewi (Burmese: သီရိမဟာစန္ဒာဒေဝီ, pronounced [θìɹḭ məhà sàɴdà dèwì]; Pali: Sirimahāsandādevī) was a principal queen consort of King Mingyi Nyo of Toungoo Dynasty.

== Brief ==
The queen was descended from the House of Mohnyin of Ava royalty from both sides.

Ancestry of Queen Thiri Maha Sanda Dewi

8. Narapati I of Ava
4. Thihathura of Ava
9. Atula Thiri Maha Yaza Dewi of Ava
2. Thado Dhamma Yaza of Salin
10. Thihapate of Mohnyin
5. Ameitta Thiri Maha Dhamma Dewi
11. Min Hla Myat of Mohnyin
1. Min Hla Htut of Salin
12. Minye Kyawswa II of Prome (Saw Shwe Khet)
6. Mingyi Phyu of Sagaing
13. Saw Min Phyu
3. Sagaing Minthami
14. Narapati I of Ava
7. Min Hla Htut of Sagaing
15. Atula Thiri Maha Yaza Dewi of Ava

The queen's personal name was Min Hla Htut (မင်းလှထွတ်, pronounced [mɪ́ɴ l̥a̰ tʰʊʔ]). She was born in Salin where her father Thado Dhamma Yaza was viceroy and ruled ten towns of central Burma (present-day Magwe Region). In 1483, her father, who had been in revolt of his elder brother King Minkhaung II since 1481, died. Her uncle the king brought his nieces to Ava (Inwa), and raised them as his own. Min Hla Htut had an elder sister, Min Shwe Kyu, and a younger sister, Shin Htwe.

Her life at Ava ended a year after Minkhaung II's death in April 1501. The new king and her first cousin Narapati II was eager to retain the loyalty of his vassals. In 1502, Narapati II sent her off to Toungoo (Taungoo) in a marriage of state to Mingyi Nyo, Viceroy of Toungoo. At Toungoo, she became the second ranked vicereine of the ambitious viceroy. Mingyi Nyo was never more than a nominal vassal, and on 16 October 1510 formally declared independence. On 11 April 1511, Mingyi Nyo held his coronation ceremony, in which he bestowed Min Hla Htut the title of Thiri Maha Sanda Dewi. She had no children.

== Bibliography ==
- Royal Historical Commission of Burma (1832). Hmannan Yazawin (in Burmese). Vol. 1–3 (2003 ed.). Yangon: Ministry of Information, Myanmar.
- Sein Lwin Lay, Kahtika U (1968). Mintaya Shwe Hti and Bayinnaung: Ketumadi Taungoo Yazawin (in Burmese) (2006, 2nd printing ed.). Yangon: Yan Aung Sarpay.

Thiri Maha Sanda Dewi of Toungoo Toungoo Dynasty Born: c. 1480
Royal titles
New title	Queen of the Northern Palace of Toungoo; 16 October 1510 – 24 November 1530	Succeeded by Khin Myat
