= Yaza Dewi of Toungoo =

Yaza Dewi ရာဇဒေဝီ

Queen consort of Toungoo
- Tenure: 16 April 1516 – 24 November 1530
- Born: c. 1500; Le Way
- Spouse: Mingyi Nyo
- Issue: Tabinshwehti
- House: Toungoo
- Father: Thura Kyawkhaung
- Religion: Theravada Buddhism

Yaza Dewi (Burmese: ရာဇဒေဝီ, pronounced [jàza̰ dèwì]) was a junior queen consort of King Mingyi Nyo of Toungoo and the mother of King Tabinshwehti. Born Khin Oo (ခင်ဦး) to the village chief of Le Way, she became a concubine of the king in 1515. After she gave birth to their first and only son, the king raised the teenage commoner to the rank of queen with the style of Yaza Dewi.

== Bibliography ==
- Sein Lwin Lay, Kahtika U (1968). Mintaya Shwe Hti and Bayinnaung: Ketumadi Taungoo Yazawin (in Burmese) (2006, 2nd printing ed.). Yangon: Yan Aung Sarpay.
