= Yazathu of Talok =

Yazathu of Talok; တလုပ် ရာဇသူ

Governor of Talok
- Reign: c. 1383/84 – 1413 or later
- Predecessor: Saw Me
- Successor: ?
- Monarch: Swa Saw Ke; Minkhaung I
- Born: c. 1350s Pinya Kingdom
- Died: 1413 or later Ava Kingdom
- Spouse: Min Padamya
- Issue: Min Shwe Pan; Duchess of Nyaungshwe; Duchess of Legaing
- Father: Min Maha of Nyaungyan
- Mother: Saw Min Hla of Pinya

Yazathura of Talok (Burmese: တလုပ် ရာဇသူရ, pronounced [təloʊʔ jàza̰θùɹa̰]; or more commonly known as Yazathu, [jàzəðù]) was governor Talok (in present-day central Myanmar) during the late 14th and early 15th centuries. A son-in-law of King Swa Saw Ke of Ava, Yazathu also served as a regimental commander in the Royal Ava Army. He participated in the first three wars against the southern Hanthawaddy kingdom.

== Brief ==
According to the royal chronicles, Yazathura (often shortened to Yazathu) was born to Princess Saw Min Hla of Pinya and Min Maha of Nyaungyan during the Pinya period. He was descended from the Pagan royal line through his father, and from both Pinya and Pagan royal lines through his mother. His paternal grandfather Min Letya was governor of Nyaungyan and ten towns, and his maternal grandfather was King Kyawswa I of Pinya (r. 1344–1350).

Yazathu was married to Princess Min Padamya, the eldest daughter of King Swa Saw Ke of Ava (r. 1367–1400). He was appointed governor of Talok, about 80 km southwest of Ava (Inwa), c. 1383/84. (Note: The narratives in the Maha Yazawin and Hmannan Yazawin chronicles are ambiguous; they can be read as Yazathu being appointed governor of Talok in 1368 or in the early 1380s.: The Maha Yazawin (1724) first mentions Yazathu as governor of Talok in the section about the governors of the kingdom, which follows Swa's coronation ceremony on the new year's day of 730 ME (29 March 1368). Thus, it can be construed that Yazathu was appointed on or shortly after that date. A few pages later, the chronicle says Saw Me, the governor of Talok, was appointed as the vassal king of Arakan in 1380/81. It subsequently identifies Yazathu as governor of Talok, participating in the Ava–Hanthawaddy War (1385–1391).; The Yazawin Thit (1798) removes the initial section about the governors. It says Saw Me was governor of Talok in 1380/81 when he was transferred to Arakan, and later identifies Yazathu as governor of Talok participating in the Ava–Hanthawaddy War (1385–1391).; The Hmannan Yazawin (1832) simply follows the Maha Yazawin's ambiguous narrative.; Historian Michael Aung-Thwin places Yazathu's appointment in 1367/68 as part of Swa's coronation ceremony, citing the Maha Yazawin's initial narrative.; Furthermore, a more precise date for Yazathu's appointment may be 1383/84. The 1781 work, Mani Yadanabon, reports that Saw Me was appointed vassal king of Arakan in 745 ME (1383/84), not 742 ME (1380/81) as stated in the Maha Yazawin. This is another case of the Burmese numerals ၂ (2) and ၅ (5) being miscopied.)

As a loyal vassal, Yazathu served as a regimental commander in the Royal Ava Army, and participated in the first three wars against the southern Hanthawaddy kingdom between 1385 and 1413, and the 1406 conquest of Arakan.

== Military service ==
The following is a list of campaigns in which the governor of Talok or Yazathu is reported to have participated between 1385 and 1412/13 in the chronicles.

Campaign	Duration	Strength (Note: Unless otherwise stated, the military mobilization figures in this article are reduced by an order of magnitude from those reported in the royal chronicles, per G.E. Harvey's analysis in his History of Burma (1925) in the section Numerical Note (pp. 333–335).)	Notes
Ava–Hanthawaddy War (1385–1391)	1385–1386	1 regiment	Commanded a regiment in the 2nd Army
Ava–Hanthawaddy War (1385–1391)	1386–1387	1 regiment	Commanded one marine regiment in the invasion navy
Ava–Hanthawaddy War (1385–1391)	1390–1391	1 regiment	Commanded one marine regiment in the invasion navy
Ava–Hanthawaddy War (1401–1403)	November 1401–April 1402	1 regiment	Defended his fortified town of Talok, one the 12 Ava forts along the Irrawaddy
Ava–Hanthawaddy War (1401–1403); Battle of Thaymathauk	December 1402	1 regiment (1000 troops)	Commanded a regiment in the Vanguard Army led by Thado of Myohla; Driven back at Thaymathauk by the Hanthawaddy Army
Ava–Launggyet War (1406)	November 1406	1 regiment (1000 troops)	Commanded a regiment
Ava–Hanthawaddy War (1408–1418); First Ava invasion of Hanthawaddy	April–August 1408	1 regiment (1000 troops)	Commanded a regiment in the Vanguard Army
Ava–Hanthawaddy War (1408–1418); Battles of Prome and Talezi	December 1412–March 1413	1 regiment (1000 troops)	Commanded a regiment in the Royal Main Army

== Family ==
=== Ancestry ===
Yazathu was descended from the Pagan royal line on his father's side, and from Pinya and Pagan royal lines on his mother's side.

Ancestry of Yazathu of Talok (Note: For his general paternal and maternal lines, see: (Yazawin Thit Vol. 1 2012: 206) and (Hmannan Vol. 1 2003: 436); For the fief of Yazathu, the son of King Saw Hnit of Pagan, see (Hmannan Vol. 1 2003: 380); For Min Letya's fiefs being Nyaung and ten towns, see (Yazawin Thit Vol. 1 2012: 168) and (Hmannan Vol. 1 2003: 380))

16. Saw Hnit of Pagan
8. Yazathu of Pinle
17. unnamed
4. Min Letya of Nyaungyan
9. unnamed
2. Min Maha
20. Min Pe Nge of Myittha
10. Yandathu of Lanbu
21. Khin Hpone
5. Saw Chit Ke
22. Uzana I of Pinya
11. Mway Medaw of Lanbu
23. Atula Maha Dhamma Dewi of Pinya
1. Yazathura
24. Theinkha Bo of Myinsaing
12. Thihathu of Pinya
25. Lady Myinsaing
6. Kyawswa I of Pinya
26. Narathihapate of Pagan
13. Mi Saw U of Pagan
27. Shin Shwe of Pagan
3. Saw Min Hla
28. Narathihapate of Pagan
14. Kyawswa of Pagan
29. Shin Hpa of Pagan
7. Mway Medaw of Pinya
30. Yazathingyan of Pagan
15. Saw Soe of Pagan
31. Saw Khin Htut of Pagan

=== Descendants ===
Yazathu had at least three daughters.

- Min Shwe Pan, wife of Maha Thinkhaya I. According to the Hmannan Yazawin, Min Shwe Pan was a great grandmother of King Mingyi Nyo, the founder of the Toungoo Dynasty.
- Unnamed daughter, wife of Sawbwa Htaw Hmaing Gyi of Nyaungshwe, married in 1405/06
- Unnamed daughter, wife of Smin Bayan, married in 1415; Duchess of Legaing

== Bibliography ==
- Aung-Thwin, Michael A. (2017). Myanmar in the Fifteenth Century. Honolulu: University of Hawai'i Press. ISBN 978-0-8248-6783-6.
- Kala, U (2006) [1724]. Maha Yazawin (in Burmese). Vol. 1–3 (4th printing ed.). Yangon: Ya-Pyei Publishing.
- Maha Sithu (2012) [1798]. Myint Swe; Kyaw Win; Thein Hlaing (eds.). Yazawin Thit (in Burmese). Vol. 1–3 (2nd printing ed.). Yangon: Ya-Pyei Publishing.
- Pan Hla, Nai (2005) [1968]. Razadarit Ayedawbon (in Burmese) (8th printing ed.). Yangon: Armanthit Sarpay.
- Royal Historical Commission of Burma (2003) [1832]. Hmannan Yazawin (in Burmese). Vol. 1–3. Yangon: Ministry of Information, Myanmar.
- Sandalinka, Shin (2009) [1781]. Mani Yadanabon (in Burmese) (4th printing ed.). Yangon: Seit-Ku Cho Cho.

Yazathu of Talok Ava Kingdom Born: 1350s? Died: ?
Preceded by Saw Me	Governor of Talok c. 1383/84–1413 or later	Succeeded by ?
