= Khin Myat of Toungoo =

Khin Myat ခင်မြတ်

Queen of the Northern Palace
- Tenure: 24 November 1530 – 30 April 1550
- Predecessor: Thiri Maha Sanda Dewi
- Successor: Sanda Dewi
- Born: c. 1516; Toungoo (Taungoo)
- Died: ?
- Spouse: Tabinshwehti
- Issue: none
- House: Toungoo
- Father: Thado Dhamma Yaza I
- Religion: Theravada Buddhism

Khin Myat (Burmese: ခင်မြတ်, pronounced [kʰɪ̀ɴ mjaʔ]) was a principal queen consort of King Tabinshwehti of Toungoo Dynasty of Burma (Myanmar). Her father Shin Nita was part of the 7-person royal household staff that raised Tabinshwehti. In 1530, she and her friend Khin Hpone Soe became queens of Tabinshwehti.

== Bibliography ==
- Royal Historical Commission of Burma (1832). Hmannan Yazawin (in Burmese). Vol. 1–3 (2003 ed.). Yangon: Ministry of Information, Myanmar.
- Sein Lwin Lay, Kahtika U (1968). Min Taya Shwe Hti and Bayinnaung: Ketumadi Taungoo Yazawin (in Burmese) (2006, 2nd printing ed.). Yangon: Yan Aung Sarpay.

Khin Myat of Toungoo Toungoo Dynasty
Royal titles
Preceded by Thiri Maha Sanda Dewi	Queen of the Northern Palace of Toungoo; 24 November 1530 – 30 April 1550	Succeeded by Sanda Dewi
