= Sithu of Pinya =

Sithu; စည်သူ

Regent of Pinya
- Reign: 1 September 1340 – 29 March 1344
- Predecessor: Uzana I (as King)
- Successor: Kyawswa I (as King)

Governor of Myinsaing
- Reign: c. 1312/13 – c. 1342 (Note: His successor Thettawshay is first mentioned as governor of Myinsaing in 1341/42 (in the Yazawin Thit chronicle) or 1342/43 (in the Maha Yazawin and Hmannan Yazawin chronicles.))
- Predecessor: Yazathingyan (as Viceroy)
- Successor: Thettawshay
- Born: c. early 1280s Pagan (Bagan)
- Died: ? Pinya Kingdom
- Consort: Saw Htut
- Issue: Saw Gyi (daughter); Saw Einthe (daughter)
- House: Myinsaing
- Father: Narathihapate
- Mother: Shin Shwe
- Religion: Theravada Buddhism

Sithu of Pinya (Burmese: စည်သူ, [sìðù]; also known as Myinsaing Sithu) was regent of Pinya from 1340 to 1344. He is not mentioned in any of the royal chronicles. He only appears in a Pinya era inscription as "King" Myinsaing Sithu. Sithu, who according to the inscription succeeded Uzana I, may have been a caretaker for his nephew and son-in-law Kyawswa I of Pinya. Sithu's elder daughter Saw Gyi was married to Kyawswa I. At least one contemporary inscription donated by Kyawswa I's chief consort on 17 June 1342 disputes Sithu's claim, saying that Kyawswa I was already king.

The king was likely Kyawswa I's maternal uncle since Kyawswa I's father Thihathu had only two brothers, Athinkhaya and Yazathingyan, both of whom had already died.

== Bibliography ==
- Kala, U (2006) [1724]. Maha Yazawin (in Burmese). Vol. 1–3 (4th printing ed.). Yangon: Ya-Pyei Publishing.
- Maha Sithu (2012) [1798]. Myint Swe; Kyaw Win; Thein Hlaing (eds.). Yazawin Thit (in Burmese). Vol. 1–3 (2nd printing ed.). Yangon: Ya-Pyei Publishing.
- Royal Historical Commission of Burma (2003) [1832]. Hmannan Yazawin (in Burmese). Vol. 1–3. Yangon: Ministry of Information, Myanmar.
- Sein Lwin Lay, Kahtika U (2006) [1968]. Mintaya Shwe Hti and Bayinnaung: Ketumadi Taungoo Yazawin (in Burmese) (2nd printing ed.). Yangon: Yan Aung Sarpay.
- Than Tun (December 1959). "History of Burma: A.D. 1300–1400". Journal of Burma Research Society. XLII (II).

Sithu of Pinya Myinsaing Dynasty
Regnal titles
Preceded by Uzana I	King of Pinya; 1340–1344	Succeeded by Kyawswa I
Royal titles
Preceded by Yazathingyan as Viceroy	Governor of Myinsaing c. 1312/13–c. 1342	Succeeded by Thettawshay
