= Htaw Hmaing Gyi of Nyaungshwe =

Htaw Hmaing Gyi

Sawbwa of Nyaungshwe
- Reign: by 1405/06 – ?
- King: Minkhaung I
- Born: ?
- Died: ?
- Spouse: Younger daughter of Yazathu of Talok (m. 1405/06)

Htaw Hmaing Gyi (Burmese: ထော်မှိုင်းကြီး, Burmese pronunciation: [tʰò m̥áiɰ̃ dʑí]; also spelled Hto Hmain Gyi) was sawbwa of Nyaungshwe (Yawnghwe) and Yatsauk (Lawksawk) in the early 15th century. He became a vassal of Ava in 1405/06, and later participated in the Ava–Hanthawaddy War (1408–1418).

== Biography ==
The royal chronicles provide minimal details about Htaw Hmaing Gyi (lit. "Htaw Hmaing the Elder"). (Note: Presumably, there was a younger Htaw Hmaing.) He was the sawbwa (chief) of Nyaungshwe (Yawnghwe), a Shan-speaking state, located north the Inle Lake. His domain also included the nearby region of Yatsauk (Lawksawk). In 1405/06 (767 ME), he traveled to Ava (Inwa) and pledged allegiance to King Minkhaung I. This decision was heavily influenced by his northern neighbor, Tho Kyaung Bwa of Onbaung, who had submitted to Ava one year earlier in 1404/05. The submission was attributed to the success of Ava's Chief Minister Min Yaza's Shan states policy. Historian Michael Aung-Thwin suggests the sawbwa may have sought "Ava's patronage" to counter the "Ming pressure in the north to pacify Yunnan", and to achieve equal standing amongst the fellow sawbwas who had chosen sides.

As a vassal, Htaw Hmaing pledged an annual tribute of finest local products including fine suede, cloth, and rare woods. He also committed to supplying infantry, cavalry and elephantry units to the Royal Ava Army during wartime. As part of the tribute ceremony, Minkhaung arranged Htaw Hmaing's marriage to the younger daughter of Governor Yazathu of Talok.

Htaw Hmaing proved to be a reliable vassal. During the Ava–Hanthawaddy War (1408–1418), the sawbwa personally led his Nyaungshwe Regiment on at least two campaigns (1408 and 1410–1411) to the south. He is not mentioned in the chronicles after 1410/11. (Note: This absence coincides with the Chinese-sponsored invasions of northern Ava that began in 1412. His northern neighbor Tho Kyaung Bwa is also absent in the post-1411 campaign rosters.)

== Military service ==
The following is a list of campaigns, in which Htaw Hmaing is explicitly mentioned as a commander in the chronicles.

Campaign	Duration	Troops commanded (Note: Chronicle reported troop levels reduced by an order of magnitude per (Harvey 1925: 333–336))	Notes
1st invasion of Hanthawaddy	April–August 1408	1000 troops	Commanded a regiment in the Vanguard Army of the invasion force
3rd invasion of Hanthawaddy	c. November 1410–c. January 1411	1000 troops	Commanded a regiment in the invasion army of the Irrawaddy delta

== Bibliography ==
- Aung-Thwin, Michael A. (2017). Myanmar in the Fifteenth Century. Honolulu: University of Hawai'i Press. ISBN 978-0-8248-6783-6.
- Fernquest, Jon (Autumn 2006). "Crucible of War: Burma and the Ming in the Tai Frontier Zone (1382–1454)" (PDF). SOAS Bulletin of Burma Research. 4 (2). Archived (PDF) from the original on 2017-08-10.
- Harvey, G. E. (1925). History of Burma: From the Earliest Times to 10 March 1824. London: Frank Cass & Co. Ltd.
- Kala, U (2006) [1724]. Maha Yazawin (in Burmese). Vol. 1–3 (4th printing ed.). Yangon: Ya-Pyei Publishing.
- Maha Sithu (2012) [1798]. Myint Swe; Kyaw Win; Thein Hlaing (eds.). Yazawin Thit (in Burmese). Vol. 1–3 (2nd printing ed.). Yangon: Ya-Pyei Publishing.
- Royal Historical Commission of Burma (2003) [1832]. Hmannan Yazawin (in Burmese). Vol. 1–3. Yangon: Ministry of Information, Myanmar.

Htaw Hmaing Gyi of Nyaungshwe Died: ?
Preceded by	Sawbwa of Nyaungshwe by 1405/06 – ?	Succeeded by
