= Thettawshay of Myinsaing =

Thettawshay of Myinsaing; မြင်စိုင်း သက်တော်ရှည်

Governor of Myinsaing
- Reign: c. 1342 – ?
- Predecessor: Sithu
- Successor: Shwe Nan Shin
- Monarch: Kyawswa I of Pinya
- Spouse: Daughter of Kyawswa I and Atula Sanda Dewi of Pinya
- Issue: Daughter, wife of Thihapate I of Taungdwin

Thettawshay of Myinsaing (Burmese: မြင်စိုင်း သက်တော်ရှည်, pronounced [mjɪ̀ɰ̃ záɪɰ̃ θɛʔdɔ̀ʃè]) was a 14th-century governor of Myinsaing. He was a core supporter of his father-in-law, King Kyawswa I of Pinya. Thettawshay is identified as an ancestor of Queen Shin Myat Hla of Ava, and of all subsequent Ava kings from Minye Kyawswa I to Narapati II.

== Brief ==
The royal chronicles provide no information about Thettawshay's personal background. He is first mentioned as governor of Myinsaing with conflicting dates: either 1341/42 in the Yazawin Thit chronicle or 1342/43 in the Maha Yazawin and Hmannan Yazawin chronicles. (Note: According to inscriptional evidence, the previous governor of Myinsaing, Sithu, became the caretaker regent of Pinya on 1 September 1340.) Thettawshay was one of the core supporters of King Kyawswa I of Pinya who seized the Pinya throne in 1341/42 or 1342/43. (Note: According to contemporary inscriptions, Kyawswa had already declared himself king by the full moon of Waso 704 ME (17 June 1342).; Kyawswa became the undisputed ruler by 29 March 1344.)

Both the Yazawin Thit and Hmannan chronicles state that Thettawshay was a son-in-law of King Kyawswa I of Pinya. He was married to the second daughter of King Kyawswa and Queen Atula Sanda Dewi. (Note: Chronicles provide conflicting information regarding his familial ties.: The Yazawin Thit (1798) and Hmannan (1832) identify Thettawshay of Myinsaing as a son-in-law of Kyawswa in the section on King Kyawswa I of Pinya. In a later section about Queen Shin Myat Hla of Ava's ancestry, the two chronicles identify him as a son-in-law of King Thihathu. Since Thihathu was Kyawswa's father, Thettawshay should have been identified as a grandson-in-law, not son-in-law.; The Maha Yazawin omits this Thettawshay's background altogether. However, in the section about King Mingyi Nyo's ancestry, it says Thettawshay was a son of Gov. Shwe Nan Shin of Myinsaing. The Yazawin Thit and Hmannan reject this lineage by stating that the Thettawshay, who was the ancestor of Mingyi Nyo, was a grandson of King Kyawswa I of Pinya.) The Yazawin Thit continues that Thettawshay of Myinsaing was an ancestor of Queen Shin Myat Hla of Ava, whose lineage is traced through his daughter's marriage to Thihapate I of Taungdwin. The chronicle cites contemporary frescoes at the Shwe Kyaung Monastery in Pagan (Bagan), donated by the queen herself to describe her ancestry. The Hmannan accepts the Yazawin Thit's account. According to this genealogical line, Thettawshay was a great grandfather of Queen Shin Myat Hla.

Ancestry of Queen Shin Myat Hla

8. Thray Sithu
4. Thihapate I of Taungdwin
9. unnamed
2. Thihapate II of Taungdwin
10. Thettawshay of Myinsaing
5. unnamed
22. Kyawswa I of Pinya
11. unnamed
23. Atula Sanda Dewi of Pinya
1. Myat Hla

== Bibliography ==
- Kala, U (2006) [1724]. Maha Yazawin (in Burmese). Vol. 1–3 (4th printing ed.). Yangon: Ya-Pyei Publishing.
- Maha Sithu (2012) [1798]. Myint Swe; Kyaw Win; Thein Hlaing (eds.). Yazawin Thit (in Burmese). Vol. 1–3 (2nd printing ed.). Yangon: Ya-Pyei Publishing.
- Royal Historical Commission of Burma (2003) [1832]. Hmannan Yazawin (in Burmese). Vol. 1–3. Yangon: Ministry of Information, Myanmar.
- Sein Lwin Lay, Kahtika U (2006) [1968]. Mintaya Shwe Hti and Bayinnaung: Ketumadi Taungoo Yazawin (in Burmese) (2nd printing ed.). Yangon: Yan Aung Sarpay.
- Than Tun (December 1959). "History of Burma: A.D. 1300–1400". Journal of Burma Research Society. XLII (II).

Thettawshay of Myinsaing Ava Kingdom Born: ? Died: ?
Preceded by Sithu	Governor of Myinsaing c. 1342–?	Succeeded by Shwe Nan Shin
