= Thray Thinkhaya of Pinle =

Thray Thinkhaya; သရေ သင်္ခယာ

Governor of Pinle
- Reign: 1386 – 1427
- Predecessor: Min Letwe
- Successor: Minye Kyawhtin (as king)
- Monarch: Swa Saw Ke; Minkhaung I; Thihathu; Min Hla; Min Nyo; Thado
- Born: ? Ava Kingdom
- Died: 1427 or later Ava Kingdom
- Father: ? (Note: The royal chronicles provide no information about his ancestry. However, since Pinle was one of the former royal capitals, Thray Thinkhaya most probably belonged to a powerful branch of the royal family.)
- Mother: ?

Thray Thinkhaya (Burmese: သရေ သင်္ခယာ, pronounced [θəɹè θɪ̀ɰ̃kʰəjà]) was governor of Pinle from 1386 to 1427. He also served as a Royal Ava Army commander, and participated in the Ava–Hanthawaddy War (1385–1391) and the Ava–Hanthawaddy War (1422–1423). His governorship ended in late 1427 when the army of Prince Minye Kyawhtin captured the fortified town.

== Military service ==
The following is a list of campaigns the governor participated in according to the royal chronicles.

Campaign	Duration	Troops commanded (Note: Chronicle reported troop levels reduced by an order of magnitude per (Harvey 1925: 333–336))	Notes
Ava–Hanthawaddy War (1385–1391)	1386–1387	1 regiment (1000 troops)	Commanded one of the two vanguard regiments that captured Hmawbi before being driven back a few months later
Ava–Hanthawaddy War (1385–1391)	1390–1391	1 regiment (1000 troops)	Part of the invasion army led by Crown Prince Tarabya that invaded the Sittaung front
Ava–Hanthawaddy War (1422–1423)	1422–1423	1 regiment (1000 troops)	Part of the invasion army commanded by Gov. Thado of Mohnyin

The chronicles list Pinle as one of the 53 or 54 fortified towns in Ava's defense network during the Ava–Hanthawaddy War (1401–1403). However, the town itself did not see any action during the war. (Note: Pinle was one of the "original eleven districts" (khayaing) since the Pagan period, and was well defended by high brick walls.)

== Bibliography ==
- Aung-Thwin, Michael A. (2017). Myanmar in the Fifteenth Century. Honolulu: University of Hawai'i Press. ISBN 978-0-8248-6783-6.
- Kala, U (2006) [1724]. Maha Yazawin (in Burmese). Vol. 1–3 (4th printing ed.). Yangon: Ya-Pyei Publishing.
- Maha Sithu (2012) [1798]. Kyaw Win; Thein Hlaing (eds.). Yazawin Thit (in Burmese). Vol. 1–3 (2nd ed.). Yangon: Ya-Pyei Publishing.
- Royal Historical Commission of Burma (2003) [1832]. Hmannan Yazawin (in Burmese). Vol. 1–3. Yangon: Ministry of Information, Myanmar.

Thray Thinkhaya of Pinle Ava Born: c. 1370s Died: 1427 or later
Preceded by Min Letwe	Governor of Pinle; 1386 – 1427	Succeeded by Minye Kyawhtin as king
