= Nyaungyan =

Nyaungyan ညောင်ရမ်းမြို့
- Location in Burma
- Coordinates: 20°45′0″N 96°2′0″E
- Country: Burma
- Division: Mandalay
- District: Meiktila District

Population
  - Religions: Buddhism
- Time zone: UTC+6.30 (MST)

Nyaungyan (Burmese: ညောင်ရမ်းမြို့) is a town in Mandalay Region, Myanmar.
