= Min Letwe of Pinle =

Min Letwe; မင်း လက်ဝဲ

Governor of Pinle
- Reign: c. 1349 – 1386
- Predecessor: Nawrahta
- Successor: Thray Thinkhaya

Governor of Sikyay
- Reign: ? – 1349
- Predecessor: ?
- Successor: ?
- Born: c. 1330s: Pinle; Pinya Kingdom
- Died: 1386: Hmawbi; Hanthawaddy kingdom
- Issue: Thettawshay of Sikyay; Thinkhaya of Wadi
- Father: Kyawswa I of Pinya
- Mother: Mway Medaw of Pinya
- Religion: Theravada Buddhism

Min Letwe (Burmese: မင်းလက်ဝဲ, pronounced [mɪ́ɴ lɛʔ wɛ́]; d. 1386) was a Pinya prince who served as governor of Pinle from c. 1349 to 1386 under both Pinya and Ava monarchs. The prince was killed in action outside of Hmawbi in 1386, during the first campaign of the Ava–Hanthawaddy War (1385–1391). The Yazawin Thit and Hmannan Yazawin chronicles identify him as a paternal ancestor of King Mingyi Nyo, the founder of the Toungoo Dynasty.

== Brief ==
Min Letwe was the elder child of King Kyawswa I of Pinya and Queen Mway Medaw of Pinya. His father hailed from both Myinsaing and Pagan royal lines while his mother was of the Pagan royal line. He had one younger full sister, (Note: Chronicles report slightly different information about his full sister(s). (Maha Yazawin Vol. 1 2006: 266) says Letwe had two full siblings: an unnamed middle sister, who was married to Gov. Min Maha of Nyaungyan, and Saw Min Hla who died before reaching the age of marriage. (Yazawin Thit Vol. 1 2012: 168) says he had just one full younger sister named Saw Min Lat, who was married to Gov. Min Maha of Nyaungyan. (Hmannan Vol. 1 2003: 380) follows Yazawin Thit but corrects the sister's name to Saw Min Hla.) and at least six half-siblings.

According to the royal chronicles, Min Letwe's first fief was Sikyay before being appointed governor of Pinle, one of the three ancestral capitals of the Myinsaing–Pinya dynasty. He succeeded his uncle, Nawrahta, who fled to the rival Sagaing Kingdom during King Nawrahta Minye's short reign in 1349. (Note: Per inscriptional evidence (Yazawin Thit Vol. 1 2012: 175, footnotes 5 and 6), Nawrahta Minye reigned for seven months and was alive on 8 November 1349 (Sunday, 13th waning of Tazaungmon 711 ME).)

He apparently survived the fall of Pinya in 1364, and the subsequent founding of the kingdom of Ava a year later. In late 1385, Letwe went to the front in what turned out to the first campaign of the Ava–Hanthawaddy War (1385–1391). But he died in battle while leading his regiment en route to Hmawbi. His Pinle post was succeeded by Thray Thinkhaya.

According to the Yazawin Thit and Hmannan Yazawin chronicles, Min Letwe, through his son Thettawshay, was a paternal ancestor of King Mingyi Nyo, the founder of the Toungoo Dynasty. He had another son, Thinkhaya of Wadi.

== Ancestry ==
The following ancestry information is per the Hmannan Yazawin chronicle, which corrects Queen Mway Medaw's ancestry reported in the earlier Maha Yazawin.

Ancestry of Min Letwe of Pinle

8. Theinkha Bo
4. Thihathu
9. Lady Myinsaing
2. Kyawswa I of Pinya
10. Narathihapate
5. Mi Saw U
11. Shin Shwe of Pagan
1. Min Letwe
12. Narathihapate
6. Kyawswa of Pagan
13. Shin Shwe of Pagan
3. Mway Medaw of Pinya
14. Yazathingyan of Pagan
7. Saw Soe of Pagan
15. Saw Khin Htut of Pagan

== Bibliography ==
- Kala, U (2006) [1724]. Maha Yazawin (in Burmese). Vol. 1–3 (4th printing ed.). Yangon: Ya-Pyei Publishing.
- Maha Sithu (2012) [1798]. Myint Swe; Kyaw Win; Thein Hlaing (eds.). Yazawin Thit (in Burmese). Vol. 1–3 (2nd printing ed.). Yangon: Ya-Pyei Publishing.
- Royal Historical Commission of Burma (2003) [1832]. Hmannan Yazawin (in Burmese). Vol. 1–3. Yangon: Ministry of Information, Myanmar.

Min Letwe of Pinle Pinya Dynasty Born: c. 1330s Died: early 1386
Royal titles
Preceded by Nawrahta	Governor of Pinle c. 1349 – 1386	Succeeded by Thray Thinkhaya
