= Mway Medaw of Pinya =

Mway Medaw မွေးမယ်တော်

Queen of the Northern Palace of Pinya
- Tenure: 29 March 1344 – 12 December 1350
- Predecessor: unknown
- Successor: unknown
- Born: c. 1297; Pagan (Bagan)
- Died: Unknown; Pinya
- Spouse: Kyawswa I of Pinya
- Issue: Min Letwe of Pinle; Saw Min Hla of Nyaungyan
- House: Pinya
- Father: Kyawswa of Pagan
- Mother: Saw Soe of Pagan
- Religion: Theravada Buddhism

Mway Medaw (Burmese: မွေးမယ်တော်, pronounced [mwé mɛ̀dɔ̀]) was a queen consort of King Kyawswa I of Pinya. Of Pagan royalty, she was one of the two principal queens consort of Kyawswa, and she was known as the Queen of the Northern Palace. She was a paternal aunt of King Swa Saw Ke of Ava.

== Ancestry ==
The following is her ancestry as reported by the Hmannan Yazawin chronicle. She was the youngest child of King Kyawswa of Pagan and his chief queen Saw Soe.

Ancestry of Queen Mway Medaw

8. Uzana of Pagan
4. Narathihapate
9. Su Le Htone of Pagan
2. Kyawswa of Pagan
10. unnamed
5. Shin Hpa of Pagan
11. unnamed
1. Mway Medaw
12. unnamed
6. Yazathingyan of Pagan
13. unnamed
3. Saw Soe of Pagan
14. Kyaswa of Pagan
7. Saw Khin Htut of Pagan
15. Yaza Dewi of Pagan

== Bibliography ==
- Royal Historical Commission of Burma (2003) [1832]. Hmannan Yazawin (in Burmese). Vol. 1–3. Yangon: Ministry of Information, Myanmar.
- Than Tun (December 1959). "History of Burma: A.D. 1300–1400". Journal of Burma Research Society. XLII (II).

Mway Medaw of Pinya Pinya Kingdom Born: c. 1297
Royal titles
Unknown	Queen of the Northern Palace of Pinya; 29 March 1344 – 12 December 1350	Unknown
