= Kyawswa I of Pinya =

Kyawswa I of Pinya; ငါးစီးရှင် ကျော်စွာ
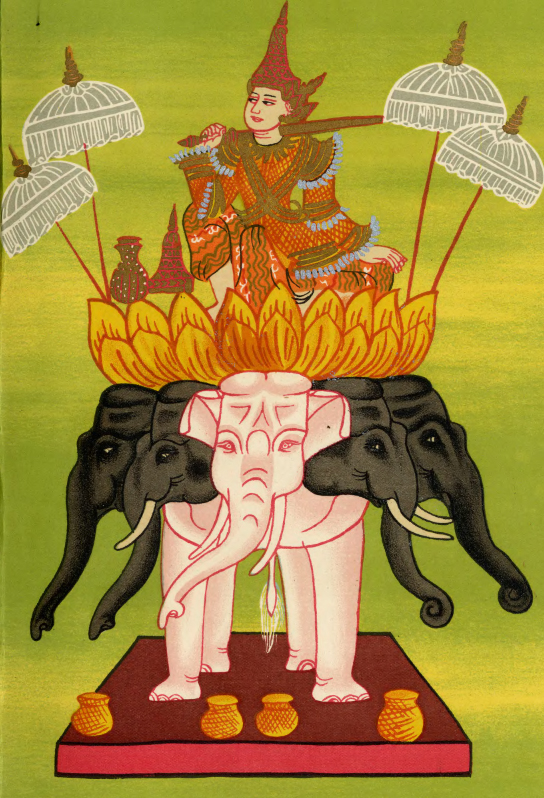
- Kyawswa I depicted as the Nga-zi Shin nat (spirit)

King of Pinya
- Reign: 29 March 1344 – 12 December 1350
- Predecessor: Sithu (as regent)
- Successor: Kyawswa II

Viceroy of Pinle
- Reign: c. February 1325 – 29 March 1344
- Coronation: 7 February 1313
- Predecessor: himself (as governor)
- Successor: Nawrahta (as governor)

Governor of Pinle
- Reign: 7 February 1313 – c. February 1325
- Coronation: 7 February 1313
- Predecessor: Thihathu (as co-regent)
- Successor: himself (as viceroy)
- Born: 1299; Monday, 661 ME; Myinsaing, Myinsaing Regency
- Died: 12 December 1350 (aged 51); Sunday, 14th waxing of Pyatho 712 ME; Pinya, Pinya Kingdom
- Consort: Atula Sanda Dewi; Mway Medaw
- Issue among others...: Uzana II; Kyawswa II; Narathu
- House: Myinsaing
- Father: Thihathu
- Mother: Mi Saw U
- Religion: Theravada Buddhism

Kyawswa I of Pinya (Burmese: ငါးစီးရှင် ကျော်စွာ, pronounced [ŋázíʃɪ̀ɰ̃ tɕɔ̀zwà]; lit. 'Lord of the Five White Elephants'; 1299–1350) was king of Pinya from 1344 to 1350. His six-year reign briefly restored unity in southern Upper Burma although his authority over his southernmost vassals remained largely nominal. He suddenly died in 1350, and came to be regarded as one of the major Burmese folk spirits, known as Nga-zi Shin Nat.

== Early life ==
Born in 1299, Kyawswa was the elder son of Queen Mi Saw U of Pagan and Thihathu, Co-Regent of Myinsaing. He was born in Myinsaing but grew up at the Pinle Palace with his younger brother Nawrahta; three half-siblings Uzana, Saw Yun, and Saw Pale; and one stepbrother Tarabya. Kyawswa grew up as second in the line of succession after Uzana. (Eager to be seen as a legitimate successor to the Pagan line, Thihathu ranked his stepson Uzana, of Pagan royalty from both sides, first; and Kyawswa, of Pagan royalty the maternal side, second.)

== Governor of Pinle (1313–25) ==
On 7 February 1313, Kyawswa was appointed governor of Pinle by Thihathu who had become the sole ruler of Myinsaing, later known as the Pinya Kingdom. The governorship of his father's old fief was second only in importance behind Thihathu's appointment of Uzana as heir-apparent. (Thihathu's other children did not get any appointments.) While the governorship was likely a titular title in the beginning, by 1315, Kyawswa like Uzana was given command of his own military units (1000 shielded infantry, 80 cavalry, 10 elephants).

In 1316–17, Kyawswa became ensnared in palace succession intrigues. The king asked Kyawswa to retake Sagaing which Saw Yun had fortified after unsatisfied with what the prince perceived to be a second-class status. When Kyawswa got the order, Uzana had already tried, and failed. But Kyawswa's expedition too failed. The king seemed halfhearted about punishing Saw Yun, and did not mobilize all his forces. Uzana and Kyawswa had march with their own small army, separately. But when Toungoo (Taungoo) revolted in 1317, Thihathu asked both Uzana and Kyawswa with a combined army to march to Toungoo. The two brothers got Toungoo's ruler Thawun Nge to submit.

The Sagaing affair remained unresolved. It is unclear if Sagaing could have been taken if Thihathu ordered a larger expedition as he did with Toungoo. But the king accepted Saw Yun's nominal submission, and did not again order another attack. Though Uzana remained the official crown prince, Saw Yun was already the de facto ruler of the northern country. Thihathu was resigned to the fact that his kingdom would be split into two after his death.

== Viceroy of Pinle (1325–44) ==
As Thihathu feared, the Pinya kingdom formally separated into two at his death in 1325. Uzana's rump Pinya Kingdom ruled the eastern and southern Central Burma while Saw Yun's Sagaing Kingdom ruled the northern and western parts. Kyawswa did not openly challenge Uzana. But he continued to have his own army and conducted his own policy. Indeed, it was Kyawswa, who famously ordered his commander Khin Nyo to assassinate Saw Yun. The assassination attempt did not succeed but Kyawswa turned his attention to the control of Pinya in the following years. Both he and Uzana maintained separate specialized military units (shielded infantry, cavalry, war elephants) around their core region of Kyaukse.

The brothers' rivalry greatly limited Pinya's effective power. Its southernmost vassals were practically independent, and had to fend for themselves. Pinya took no action with the 1325 assassination of Saw Hnit, the Pinya-recognized ruler of Toungoo. Nor did it take any action when Ramanya attacked Prome (Pyay) in 1330, or when Arakan attacked Thayet in 1334.

The rivalry came to a head in 1340. Kyawswa had collected five white elephants, considered auspicious symbols of Burmese monarchs. Instead of handing them over to his overlord Uzana, he kept them. Uzana asked for them twice. Both times, Kyawswa refused, and sent two regular elephants instead.

The refusals signaled war. Uzana ultimately backed down, and looked for a face-saving way out. The king handed over the power to Gov. Sithu of Myinsaing, uncle and father-in-law of Kyawswa, on 1 September 1340, and became a monk at Mekkhaya. Father-in-law or not, Kyawswa apparently did not recognize Sithu either. According to an inscription donated on 17 June 1342 by Kyawswa's chief queen consort Atula Sanda Dewi, Kyawswa had already claimed himself king. A contemporary inscription shows that Kyawswa became the undisputed ruler of Pinya on 29 March 1344.

== King of Pinya (1344–50) ==
Kyawswa's the reign name was Pawara Pandita Thihathura Dhamma Yaza but was popularly known as Nga-zi Shin (ငါးစီးရှင်, "Lord of the Five White Elephants"). The new king quickly consolidated his hold over the core region of Kyaukse and its periphery. He was able to buy off his potential rivals by using bribery, flattery and indeed the threat of force. He appeased his younger brother Nawrahta by appointing the latter governor of Pinle, his old job. He also successfully persuaded Uzana's younger son Gov. Thihapate of Yamethin not to revolt. However, his hold over the southernmost vassals was still limited. Prome under Pinya-appointed Gov. Saw Yan Naung remained calm but more remote Toungoo was another matter. Within the first three years of Kyawswa's accession, two Toungoo rulers were assassinated. Kyawswa had to be satisfied with the nominal submission by the usurpers. (Note: (Sein Lwin Lay 2006: 22): The second usurper Theingaba would later revolt outright in 1358.)

Outside of Toungoo, the kingdom was largely peaceful. He successfully reunified Pinya's military corps in the core region. An avid horse rider, the king formed elite cavalry and shielded infantry units. He not only liked to review military parades but also take part in the military dances of elite shielded units while singing military songs. He appointed his second son Kyawswa II his heir-apparent (over the eldest son Uzana who had weak or paralyzed legs). The appointment apparently did not go well with his brother Nawrahta, who defected to Sagaing in 1349. The king built the Lay-Myet-Hna Pagada in Pinya. He also commissioned a study of the state of the Buddhist clergy but the court fearing his wrath left out the corruption of the so-called monks from the report.

The king died on 12 December 1350. According to tradition, he suddenly fell ill, and died in his 9th year of reign. He is said to have become a nat (spirit) with the name Nga-zi Shin Nat. He is still venerated as one of the Outer Thirty Seven Spirits.

== Poetry ==
Kyawswa was also an influential poet during his reign. His poem Myinsaing Shwepyi (lit. 'Golden Kingdom of Myinsaing') is the most well-known poem of the kagyin form today. His reign saw the development of the kagyin as a form of martial song and dance during Horse Riding Festivals. During his father's reign, Kyawswa became enamoured with the tayagyin poetic form. During his reign, he wrote the Myinsaing Shwepyi poem to energise his sons and chose the kagyin form for its nationalistic and militaristic form. He would then perform his own poem alongside his swordsmanship.

== Administration ==
The following a list of governors reported in the chronicles. These governors were already in office by either 1341/42 per the Yazawin Thit, or 1342/43 per the Hmannan.

Rulers of Key Vassal States
Vassal state	Region	Ruler (duration in office)	Notes
Myinsaing	Core	Thettawshay of Myinsaing (by 1342–?)	Son-in-law of Kyawswa I of Pinya
Mekkhaya	Core	?	
Pinle	Core	Nawrahta (by 1344–1349)	
Lanbu	Core	Yandathu (by 1342–?)	
Nyaungyan	Core	Saw Mun Hnit (by 1342–?)	
Wadi	Core	Thinkhaya (by 1342–?)	
Thagara	Core	Gonnandarit the Elder (by 1342–?)	
Yamethin	Core	Thihapate of Yamethin (by 1342–?)	
Yindaw	Core	Tuyin Ponnya the Elder (by 1342–?)	
Paukmyaing	Core	Min Pale of Paukmyaing (by 1342–?)	

== Family ==
Kyawswa had four sons and four daughters by his two principal queens consort. He also had at least one junior queen, Saw Gyi, daughter of Gov. Sithu of Myinsaing.

Queen	Rank	Issue
Atula Sanda Dewi	Chief queen	Uzana II of Pinya; Kyawswa II of Pinya; Narathu of Pinya; Pahtoni Kadaw [Lady Pahtoni], wife of Gov. Gonnandarit of Nyaungyan; unnamed daughter, wife of Gov. Thettawshay of Myinsaing; Shwe Einthe, wife of Gov. Min Pale of Paukmyaing
Mway Medaw	Queen of the Northern Palace	Min Letwe of Pinle; Saw Min Hla (Note: Chronicles report slightly different information about Mway Medaw's children. (Maha Yazawin Vol. 1 2006: 266) says the queen had three children: a son (Min Letwe), an unnamed middle daughter, who was married to Gov. Min Maha of Nyaungyan, and another daughter named Saw Min Hla who died before reaching the age of marriage. (Yazawin Thit Vol. 1 2012: 168) says the queen had just two children, a son (Min Letwe) and a daughter named Saw Min Lat, who was married to Gov. Min Maha of Nyaungyan. (Hmannan Vol. 1 2003: 380) follows Yazawin Thit but corrects the daughter's name to Saw Min Hla.)
Saw Gyi	Junior queen	?

== Chronicle reporting differences ==
The royal chronicles do not necessarily agree on his birth, death, and reign dates.

Source	Birth–Death	Age	Reign	Length of reign	Reference
Zatadawbon Yazawin List of Kings of Pinya	c. 1288 – 1351/52 [sic]	63 (64th year) [sic]	1342/43 – 1351/52	9	(Note: (Zata 1960: 43) says he died in his 64th year (at age 63) in 713 ME (1351/52), implying that he was born c. 1288. But 64th year is a typographical error (probably for 46th year) as (Zata 1960: 41) itself says his parents wedded in 662 ME (1300/01). The age of 45 (46th year) is significant; per inscriptional evidence, he became the undisputed ruler of Pinya at age 45 on 29 March 1344. This means that Zata contains two errors: (1) age at accession (46th year) is reported as age at death; and (2) 46th year is mis-copied as 64th year.)
Zatadawbon Yazawin (reconciled)	c. 1306 – 1351/52	45 (46th year)	1342/43 – 1351/52	9	
Maha Yazawin	c. 1307 – 1351/52	44 (45th year)	1342/43 – 1351/52	9	
Yazawin Thit	c. 1299 – 1350/51	51 (52nd year)	1341/42 – 1350/51	9	(Note: (Yazawin Thit Vol. 1 2012: 166, footnote 3): Yazawin Diga criticizes Yazawin Thit's implied birth dates for Uzana I and Kyawswa I since they Kyawswa I about a year older than Uzana I, whom all chronicles, including Yazawin Thit, agree was older.)
Hmannan Yazawin	c. 1300 – 1350/51	51 (52nd year)	1342/43 – 1350/51	~9	(Note: Per (Hmannan Vol. 1 2003: 380), Kyawswa I came to power in 704 ME (1342/43), and per (Hmannan Vol. 1 2003: 384), he died after a reign of almost 9 years. He successor became king in 712 ME (1350/51).)
Inscriptions	c. 1299 – 12 December 1350	51 (52nd year)	29 March 1344 – 12 December 1350	6	(Note: Per (Yazawin Thit Vol. 1 2012: 166), the inscription by Atula Sanda Dewi dated 17 June 1342 says Kyawswa was already king. It is likely that Kyawswa had declared himself king since 1340 and may not have recognized Sithu as regent. Per (Than Tun 1959: 124), Kyawswa I became undisputed king on 29 March 1344. Per (Yazawin Thit Vol. 1 2012: 168), his age at death of 51 (52nd year) is inscriptionally verified. And since he died on 14th waxing of Pyatho 712 ME (12 December 1350) at age 51, he must have been born sometime between full moon of Pyatho 660 ME (17 December 1298) and 14th waxing of Pyatho 661 ME (5 January 1300). (661 ME, a small leap year, had 13 months.))
Inscriptions	c. 1299 – 12 December 1350	51 (52nd year)	by 17 June 1342 – 12 December 1350 (contested reign)	8	

== Bibliography ==
- Burma Translation Society, ed. (1955). Myanma Swezon Kyan (in Burmese). Vol. 2 (1 ed.). Heartford, Heartfordshire: Stephen Austin & Sons, Ltd.
- Burma Translation Society, ed. (1973). Myanma Swezon Kyan (in Burmese). Vol. 13 (1 ed.). Yangon: Sarpay Beikman.
- Harvey, G. E. (1925). History of Burma: From the Earliest Times to 10 March 1824. London: Frank Cass & Co. Ltd.
- Htin Aung, Maung (1967). A History of Burma. New York and London: Cambridge University Press.
- Kala, U (2006) [1724]. Maha Yazawin (in Burmese). Vol. 1–3 (4th printing ed.). Yangon: Ya-Pyei Publishing.
- Maha Sithu (2012) [1798]. Myint Swe; Kyaw Win; Thein Hlaing (eds.). Yazawin Thit (in Burmese). Vol. 1–3 (2nd printing ed.). Yangon: Ya-Pyei Publishing.
- Phayre, Lt. Gen. Sir Arthur P. (1967) [1883]. History of Burma. London: Susil Gupta.
- Royal Historians of Burma (1960) [c. 1680]. U Hla Tin (Hla Thamein) (ed.). Zatadawbon Yazawin (in Burmese). Historical Research Directorate of the Union of Burma.
- Royal Historical Commission of Burma (2003) [1832]. Hmannan Yazawin (in Burmese). Vol. 1–3. Yangon: Ministry of Information, Myanmar.
- Sandamala Linkara, Ashin (1997–1999) [1931]. Rakhine Razawin Thit (in Burmese). Vol. 1–2. Yangon: Tetlan Sarpay.
- Sein Lwin Lay, Kahtika U (2006) [1968]. Min Taya Shwe Hti and Bayinnaung: Ketumadi Taungoo Yazawin (in Burmese) (2nd printing ed.). Yangon: Yan Aung Sarpay.
- Than Tun (December 1959). "History of Burma: A.D. 1300–1400". Journal of Burma Research Society. XLII (II).

Kyawswa I of Pinya Myinsaing Dynasty Born: 1299 Died: 12 December 1350
Regnal titles
Preceded by Sithu of Pinya	King of Pinya; 29 March 1344 – 12 December 1350	Succeeded by Kyawswa II
Royal titles
Preceded by Uzana I	Heir to the Pinya Throne c. February 1325 – 29 March 1344	Succeeded by Kyawswa II
Preceded by himself as Governor	Viceroy of Pinle c. February 1325 – 29 March 1344	Succeeded by Nawrahta
Preceded by Thihathu as co-regent	Governor of Pinle; 7 February 1313 – c. February 1325	Succeeded by himself as Viceroy
