= Minbyauk Thihapate =

Thihapate of Sagaing မင်းပြောက် သီဟပတေ့

King of Sagaing
- Reign: 23 February 1352 – April 1364
- Coronation: 23 February 1352
- Predecessor: Tarabya II
- Successor: Thado Minbya
- Born: 28 October 1305; 11th waxing of Tazaungmon 667 ME; Pagan (Bagan)? Myinsaing Regency
- Died: c. May 1364 (aged 58) c. Nayon 726 ME; Kya-Khat-Wa-Ya, Sagaing Kingdom
- Consort: Soe Min Kodawgyi
- Issue: Saw Taw Oo
- House: Sagaing
- Religion: Theravada Buddhism

Thihapate of Sagaing (Burmese: သီဟပတေ့, [θìha̰pətḛ]; also Minbyauk Thihapate, [mɪ́ɰ̃bjaʊʔ θìha̰pətḛ]; 1305–1364) king of Sagaing from 1352 to 1364. He came to power by being married to the powerful Princess Soe Min Kodawgyi. He led Sagaing during the most tumultuous period of the kingdom (1356−64). Despite a brief period of alliance with Pinya (1357−59), Sagaing had to face near-annual raids by the northern Shan state of Mong Mao (Maw) on its own. He lost power in April 1364 when Maw Shan forces sacked Sagaing. He escaped capture but was soon put to death by his stepson Thado Minbya at Kya-Khat-Wa-Ya, south of Sagaing.

== Early life ==
Little is known about his early life or ancestry except that he was a grandson of the elder sister of Queen Pwa Saw of Pagan. This means that he was a grandson of Queen Yadanabon and King Narathihapate of Pagan. (Note: Chronicles have no record of Queen Yadanabon. (Ba Shin 1982: 37): Her existence and her relationship to Pwa Saw is known by per a contemporary inscription dedicated by Queen Pwa Saw herself: Pwa Saw was the second child of seven, and had an elder sister, Queen Yadanabon.) Since his father was a minister at the Sagaing court, (Note: The terse language of Zatadawbon Yazawin is ambiguous. (Zata 1960: 44) says he was a "son of Amat Yo" ("အမတ်ရိုးသား"). It could technically mean that he was son of an amat (court minister) named Yo, or it could more likely mean that he was of the lineage of ministers. Furthermore, Zata mentions Chief Minister–General Nanda Pakyan in the prior sentence. It is not clear at least in modern Burmese if the amat in the following sentence refers to Nanda Pakyan or to a new concept entirely. Since Nanda Pakyan put the three prior kings of Sagaing on the throne, the powerful minister may have put his own son Thihapate on the throne. Later chronicles may have found Zata's reporting ambiguous as well. None of the later chronicles explicitly mentions who the father of Thihapate was.) Thihapate likely entered the service of Sagaing monarchs. Then in late 1351/early 1352, (Note: (Hmannan Vol. 1 2003: 385): Princess Soe Min's first husband Thado Hsinhtein of Tagaung was still alive in 1351 when he and Soe Min met King Kyawswa II of Pinya to negotiate a truce.) he married a recently widowed Princess Soe Min, daughter of the founder of the kingdom Saw Yun. It is unclear if his marriage to Soe Min preceded the death of Soe Min's brother King Tarabya II, who died at age 25 in February 1352 and left no heirs apparent to take over the throne. With no heirs apparent ready to take over, the court elected Thihapate king (or regent). (Note: Chronicles do not agree on his status. Zatadawbon Yazawin (Zata 1960: 82) considers him a regent (min nge, မင်းငယ်) while other major chronicles (Maha Yazawin Vol. 1 2006: 272–273), (Yazawin Thit 2012: 176−177), (Hmannan Vol. 1 2003:392−393) all consider him king. The Yazawin Thit chronicle (Yazawin Thit 2012: 178−179) discusses other historical sources that considered Thihapate regent but it ultimately lists him as king.) His marriage to Soe Min may have been part of the election process.

== Reign ==
His early reign was relatively peaceful. He continued Tarabya II's policy of peace with the cross-river rival Pinya. However, it was the calm before the storm. By 1355, the northern Shan state of Mong Mao had essentially achieved independence from the Mongols, and begun to look southward for expansion. In the next dry season 1356−57, Shan troops raided northern Sagaing territory. While Sagaing defenses held this time, Thihapate and Soe Min appeared to have recognized the eminent danger posed by the determined foe. They sought a closer alliance with Pinya. In 1357/58, they sent Princess Shin Saw Gyi, Soe Min's eldest daughter and Thihapate's stepdaughter, to King Kyawswa II of Pinya in a marriage of state.

The alliance yielded no discernible benefit. Kyawswa II, who did not control much beyond the core Kyaukse capital region, simply did not have enough manpower to assist Sagaing and hold his southern vassals at the same time. When the next Shan raids came in 1358−59, Pinya's southern vassal Toungoo (Taungoo) promptly revolted, and raided Pinya from the south. This allowed the Shan forces to overrun Sagaing and Pinya territories from the north. Kyawswa II died during the raids in March 1359. So devastating were the raids that Pinya's new king Narathu withdrew from the alliance.

Sagaing now faced the Shan threat on its own. In 1360/61, Thihapate appointed his eldest stepchild Thado Minbya governor of Tagaung, the northernmost Sagaing territory. But the teenage prince could do little to stem the raids. The Shan raiders not only overran Tagaung but also penetrated as far south as Pinya in 1362–63. Subsequently, Pinya pursued an alliance with Mong Mao, and the two states agreed to a joint attack on Sagaing. In the following dry season, Shan forces again overran Tagaung, and Thado Minbya barely escaped. At Sagaing, Thihapate was furious at Thado Minbya for the latter's failure to defend Tagaung. He did not accept Thado Minbya warning that the season's raid was far larger, and sent his stepson to prison at Kya-Khat-Wa-Ya, south of Sagaing.

Thihapate had expected another round of raids through the countryside but not a siege to the capital itself. He was surprised when the Shan forces laid siege to Sagaing on three sides. Pinya blockaded the port although the blockade was porous. In April 1364, Shan forces broke through, and entered the city. While panicked people of Sagaing crossed the Irrawaddy toward Pinya, Thihapate and the royal family slipped away by boat to Kya-Khat-Wa-Ya. But at Kya-Khat-Wa-Ya, Thado Minbya was waiting for him. The prince, who had been freed from prison by court officials allied with him, ordered the execution of his stepfather, and seized the throne.

== Chronicle reporting differences ==
The royal chronicles do not agree on his birth and death dates.

Source	Birth–Death	Age	Reign	Length of reign	Reference
Zatadawbon Yazawin	28 October 1305 – 1364	58 (59th year)	1355 – 1364	9	(Note: (Zata 1960: 82): He was born on Monday, 10th nekkhat of the 8th month of 667 ME = 11th waxing of Tazaungmon 667 ME = Thursday, 28 October 1305. Zata lists him as a Monday born but Hmannan (Hmannan Vol. 1 2003: 393) says he was born on a Saturday.)
Maha Yazawin	c. 1312 – c. May 1364	52 (53rd year)	1354/55 – April 1364	10	(Note: (Maha Yazawin Vol. 1 2006: 272–273): He lost power in Kason 726 ME (1 April 1364 – 30 April 1364), and was killed by Thado Minbya around the fall of Pinya in Nayon (1 May 1364 to 29 May 1364).)
Yazawin Thit	c. 1310 – 1364/65	54 (55th year)	23 February 1352 – 1364/65	13	
Hmannan Yazawin	c. 1310 – c. May 1364	54 (55th year)	11 February 1353 [sic] – April 1364	13 [sic]	(Note: (Hmannan Vol. 1 2003: 391–392) says Minbyauk Thihapate, a Saturday born, ascended the throne on Thursday, 9th waxing of Tabaung 714 ME (11 February 1353), which is a typographical error. The Yazawin Thit chronicle (Yazawin Thit Vol. 1 2012: 175–176), which Hmannan referenced, says Thursday, 9th waxing of Tabaung 713 ME (23 February 1352). The 1353 date is inconsistent with Hmannan's own reporting a page later that Thihapate was dethroned in his 13th year of reign in April 1364 (Kason 726 ME). It means he came to power in 1352, not 1353. The actual date per (Than Tun 1959: 127) was as reported in Yazawin Thit, 23 February 1352.)
Hmannan (reconciled)	c. 1310 – c. May 1364	54 (55th year)	23 February 1352 – April 1364	12	

== Bibliography ==
- Ba Shin, Bo-Hmu (1982) [1966]. "The Pwa Saws of Bagan" (PDF). Burma Historical Research Department Silver Jubilee Publication (in Burmese). Yangon: Historical Research Department. Archived from the original (PDF) on 2016-03-04.
- Royal Historians of Burma (1960) [c. 1680]. U Hla Tin (Hla Thamein) (ed.). Zatadawbon Yazawin (in Burmese). Historical Research Directorate of the Union of Burma.
- Kala, U (2006) [1724]. Maha Yazawin (in Burmese). Vol. 1–3 (4th printing ed.). Yangon: Ya-Pyei Publishing.
- Maha Sithu (2012) [1798]. Kyaw Win; Thein Hlaing (eds.). Yazawin Thit (in Burmese). Vol. 1–3 (2nd ed.). Yangon: Ya-Pyei Publishing.
- Royal Historical Commission of Burma (2003) [1832]. Hmannan Yazawin (in Burmese). Vol. 1–3. Yangon: Ministry of Information, Myanmar.
- Than Tun (December 1959). "History of Burma: A.D. 1300–1400". Journal of Burma Research Society. XLII (II).
- Than Tun (1964). Studies in Burmese History (in Burmese). Vol. 1. Yangon: Maha Dagon.

Minbyauk Thihapate Myinsaing Dynasty Born: 28 October 1305 Died: c. May 1364
Regnal titles
Preceded by Tarabya II	King of Sagaing; 23 February 1352 – April 1364	Succeeded by Thado Minbya
