= Soe Min Kodawgyi =

Soe Min Kodawgyi စိုးမင်း ကိုယ်တော်ကြီး

Chief queen consort of Sagaing
- Tenure: 23 February 1352 – April 1364
- Predecessor: unknown
- Successor: disestablished
- Born: by 1322; Sagaing, Sagaing Kingdom
- Died: Unknown; Ava (Inwa), Ava Kingdom
- Spouse: Thado Hsinhtein (1335/36−51); Thihapate (1352−64)
- Issue: Thado Minbya; Shin Saw Gyi; Saw Omma; Saw Taw Oo
- House: Myinsaing
- Father: Saw Yun
- Mother: Saw Hnaung
- Religion: Theravada Buddhism

Soe Min Kodawgyi (Burmese: စိုးမင်း ကိုယ်တော်ကြီး, pronounced [só mɪ́ɴ kòdɔ̀dʑí]) was the chief queen consort of Sagaing from 1352 to 1364. The eldest daughter of the founder of Sagaing Saw Yun was a powerful figure who twice led diplomatic missions to forge a closer alliance with Pinya in the 1350s. She was the mother of Thado Minbya, the founder of the Kingdom of Ava.

== Brief ==
Soe Min was the eldest child and the only daughter of Queen Saw Hnaung and King Saw Yun of Sagaing. (Note: The chronicle Maha Yazawin (Maha Yazawin Vol. 1 2006: 270) says she was the youngest child. But Yazawin Thit (Yazawin Thit Vol. 1 2012: 175−176) cites an inscription donated by Soe Min herself, which says she was the eldest child. Scholarship (Yazawin Thit Vol. 1 2012: 175, footnote 9) agrees with Yazawin Thit, saying that "Kodawgyi" meant the eldest child.) She was born in 1322 or earlier. (Note: Her eldest younger brother Kyaswa was born in 1323 per (Zata 1960: 43).) By 1335/36, she had been married to Thado Hsinhtein of Tagaung, the scion of Tagaung, a key vassal state of Sagaing. The couple, along with her three siblings, had to flee Sagaing in 1335/36 when her half-cousin Shwetaungtet seized the throne. They spent the next three years in Mindon, deep inside the neighboring kingdom of Pinya.

The couple returned to Sagaing in 1339 when her eldest younger brother Kyaswa became king of Sagaing. After giving birth to a son and two daughters in the following decade, the princess became increasingly involved in the affairs of the state. In 1351, during the reign of her youngest brother Tarabya II, the princess and her husband met with her second cousin King Kyawswa II of Pinya, and negotiated a truce. She soon became the kingmaker in February 1352 when Tarabya II died, leaving no heirs. Because her husband had also recently died, she married Thihapate, a court official descended from the Pagan royalty, who became the next king. She became Thihapate's chief queen; they had a daughter, Saw Taw Oo.

When the northern Shan state of Mong Mao (Maw) began raiding Sagaing territory, she sought a closer alliance with Pinya. In 1357/58, she sent her eldest daughter Shin Saw Gyi to Kyawswa II in a marriage of state, but the alliance yielded no discernible benefit as Kyawswa II could not muster enough manpower to assist Sagaing. After a devastating raid by the Maw Shans in 1358−59, Pinya's new king Narathu withdrew from the alliance.

Soe Min became the queen dowager in 1364 when her eldest child Thado Minbya overthrew Thihapate. Her three daughters all became queens of Swa Saw Ke who succeeded Thado Minbya.

== Ancestry ==
Ancestry of Queen Soe Min

8. Theinkha Bo
4. Thihathu
9. Lady Myinsaing
2. Saw Yun
10. unnamed
5. Yadanabon of Pinya
11. unnamed
1. Soe Min
12. Narathihapate
6. Kyawswa of Pagan
13. Shin Hpa of Pagan
3. Saw Hnaung of Sagaing
14. Yazathingyan of Pagan
7. Saw Soe of Pagan
15. Saw Khin Htut of Pagan

== Bibliography ==
- Royal Historians of Burma (c. 1680). U Hla Tin (Hla Thamein) (ed.). Zatadawbon Yazawin (1960th ed.). Historical Research Directorate of the Union of Burma.
- Kala, U (1724). Maha Yazawin (in Burmese). Vol. 1–3 (2006, 4th printing ed.). Yangon: Ya-Pyei Publishing.
- Royal Historical Commission of Burma (1832). Hmannan Yazawin (in Burmese). Vol. 1–3 (2003rd ed.). Yangon: Ministry of Information, Myanmar.
- Maha Sithu (2012) [First published 1798]. Kyaw Win; Thein Hlaing (eds.). Yazawin Thit (in Burmese). Vol. 1–3 (2nd ed.). Yangon: Ya-Pyei Publishing.

Soe Min Kodawgyi Sagaing Kingdom Born: by 1322
Royal titles
Unknown	Chief queen consort of Sagaing; 23 February 1352 – April 1364	Sagaing Kingdom disestablished
