= Saw Taw Oo of Sagaing =

Saw Taw Oo of Sagaing စောတော်ဦး

Queen of the Central Palace of Ava
- Tenure: c. 1390s – April 1400
- Predecessor: Saw Omma of Sagaing
- Successor: Min Pyan of Ava

Queen of the Western Palace of Ava
- Tenure: 5 September 1367 – c. 1390s
- Predecessor: new office
- Successor: Shin Mi-Nauk
- Born: c. 1353; Sagaing
- Died: Unknown; Ava (Inwa)
- Spouse: Swa Saw Ke
- Issue: Soe Min Wimala Dewi
- Father: Minbyauk Thihapate
- Mother: Soe Min Kodawgyi
- Religion: Theravada Buddhism

Saw Taw Oo (Burmese: စောတော်ဦး, pronounced [sɔ́ dɔ̀ ʔú]) was a queen consort of King Swa Saw Ke of Ava. She was the daughter of King Thihapate of Sagaing, a granddaughter of King Saw Yun, the founder of Sagaing, and a half-sister of King Thado Minbya, the founder of Ava. She was raised to be a queen of Swa Saw Ke with the title of Queen of the Central Palace, succeeding her half-sister Saw Omma. The queen was also given Pagan (Bagan) in fief.

According to a contemporary inscription, the queen donated a monastery in Wetkyi-In, and dedicated paddy farmland to the monastery in October 1396. (Note: The dedication ceremony was held on Monday, the 5th waxing of Tazaungmon 758 ME. The date can be conventionally translated as Thursday, 5 October 1396. If it was indeed on a Monday, the date may have been the 2nd waxing of Tazaungmon 758 ME (Monday, 2 October 1396). The Burmese numerals ၂ (2) and ၅ (5) have similar shapes, and can be misread/miscopied.)

== Ancestry ==
The following is her ancestry according to Hmannan. She was descended from Pagan and Pinya royalty. Her father's lineage is not reported except that he was not of royal blood and that he was a grandnephew of Queen Pwa Saw of Pagan.

Ancestry of Queen Saw Taw Oo

8. Narathihapate
4. unknown
9. Yadanabon II of Pagan
2. Minbyauk Thihapate
10. unknown
5. unknown
11. unknown
1. Saw Taw Oo
12. Thihathu
6. Saw Yun
13. Yadanabon of Pinya
3. Soe Min Kodawgyi
14. Kyawswa of Pagan
7. Saw Hnaung of Sagaing
15. Saw Soe of Pagan

== Bibliography ==
- Royal Historical Commission of Burma (2003) [1832]. Hmannan Yazawin (in Burmese). Vol. 1–3. Yangon: Ministry of Information, Myanmar.
- Taw, Sein Ko; Emanuel Forchhammer (1899). Inscriptions of Pagan, Pinya and Ava: Translation, with Notes. Rangoon: Archaeological Survey of India.

Saw Taw Oo of Sagaing Ava Kingdom Born: c. 1353 Died: c. 15th century
Royal titles
Preceded by Saw Omma of Sagaing	Queen of the Central Palace of Ava c. 1390s–1400	Succeeded by Min Pyan of Ava
New title	Queen of the Western Palace of Ava; 1367–c. 1390s	Succeeded by Shin Mi-Nauk
