= Saw Omma (disambiguation) =

Saw Omma was a Burmese royal title. It may mean:

- Saw Omma of Pinya: Chief queen consort of Pinya and Ava (1350–67)
- Saw Omma of Sagaing: Queen consort of Ava (1367–1400)
