= Kyawswa II of Pinya =

Kyawswa II of Pinya လေးစီးရှင် ကျော်စွာ

King of Pinya
- Reign: 12 December 1350 – 19 March 1359
- Predecessor: Kyawswa I
- Successor: Narathu
- Senior Ministers: Thamantabyit (Note: Per an inscription dated Thursday, the 7th waxing of Tazaungmon 718 ME (Thursday, 29 September 1356), King Kyawswa's ministers included: Thamantabyit, Takkhana and Chinbo. Per an inscription dated Saturday, the 1st waxing of Tawthalin 729 ME (Saturday, 25 September 1367), Minister Maha Patteik interred the remains of King Kyawswa on 19 March 1359.); Takkhana; Chinbo; Maha Petteik
- Born: c. early 1328; Wednesday, late 689 ME; Pinle
- Died: 19 March 1359 (aged 31); Tuesday, 6th waning of Late Tagu 720 ME; Pinya
- Burial: 19 March 1359 (Cave Pagoda), Pinya
- Consort: Saw Omma; Shin Saw Gyi
- Issue: none
- House: Myinsaing
- Father: Kyawswa I
- Mother: Atula Sanda Dewi
- Religion: Theravada Buddhism

Kyawswa II of Pinya (Burmese: လေးစီးရှင် ကျော်စွာ, pronounced [lézíʃɪ̀ɰ̃ tɕɔ̀zwà]; lit. 'Lord of the Four White Elephants'; 1328–1359) was king of Pinya from 1350 to 1359. He had little effective control over his southern vassals but agreed to an alliance with Pinya's longtime rival Sagaing to oppose the northern Shan state of Mong Mao. In 1358–59, while he tried to help Sagaing in the north, his home region of Kyaukse came under attack first by his erstwhile vassal Toungoo, and later by Mong Mao Shans. He died during the Shan raids.

His royal decree dated 12 March 1359 is the earliest known land survey (sittan) in Burmese history.

== Early life ==
The future king was born to Princess Nan Lon Me of Pagan and Viceroy Kyawswa of Pinle, c. early 1328. (Note: He died at age 31 (32nd year) per his chief queen Saw Omma's inscription (Hmannan Vol. 1 2003: 385) on or before 6th waning of Late Tagu 720 ME (19 March 1359) per (Than Tun 1959: 124). This means he was born between 6th waning of Late Tagu 688 ME (13 March 1327) and 6th waning of Tagu 690 ME (1 April 1328). And since he came to power at age 22 per Hmannan on 14th waxing of Pyatho 712 ME (12 December 1350), he was likely born in late 689 ME (early 1328).) A grandson of King Thihathu of Myinsaing–Pinya and King Kyawswa of Pagan, he hailed from both Myinsaing and Pagan royal lines. He had five full siblings and at least two half-siblings. He grew up in Pinle but moved to Pinya in 1344 when his father became the undisputed ruler of Pinya Kingdom. Although he was only the second eldest son, the younger Kyawswa was made the heir-apparent; his elder brother Uzana who had weak/paralyzed legs was passed over. The appointment apparently did not go well with Kyawswa I's brother Nawrahta, who defected to Sagaing in 1349.

== Reign ==
He succeeded his father on 12 December 1350, following his father's death. At his coronation, he took the title Thiri Tri Bhawanaditya Pawara Dhamma Yaza and Saw Omma of Thayet as his chief queen. The king was popularly known as Lay-zi Shin ("Lord of the Four White Elephants") for the four white elephants inherited from his father. (Note: Apparently, one of his father's five white elephants had died by Kyawswa II's accession. Per (Hmannan Vol. 1 2003: 385), three white elephants were still alive in 1364 when Narathu was overthrown by the Maw Shans.) Like the Pinya rulers before him, Kyawswa II's effective authority never really extended beyond the core Kyaukse granary. He never attempted to impose tighter control over his southernmost vassals Prome (Pyay) and Toungoo (Taungoo), which were practically independent. Soon after his accession, at least one key governor, Swa Saw Ke of Yamethin, defected to Sagaing, the kingdom immediately north of Pinya. But no wars broke out between Pinya and Sagaing, which at been at odds since 1315. Neither capital had much control its vassals, and were in no position to start external wars. When Princess Soe Min of Sagaing and her husband Thado Hsinhtein of Tagaung, acting as emissaries for King Tarabya II of Sagaing, proposed a truce in 1351, (Note: The truce likely took place soon after Kyawswa II's accession, most probably in 1351 as Thado Hsinhtein was still alive. Per (Than Tun 1959: 127), Soe Min's second husband Minbyauk Thihapate became king of Sagaing on 23 February 1352.) Kyawswa II readily agreed to it.

The truce brought Pinya and Sagaing branches of the Myinsaing dynasty together for the first time since 1315. The two ruling houses may have been forced into the truce by an emerging threat in the north. The Shan state of Mong Mao (Maw in Burmese), led by Si Kefa (Tho Kho Bwa) had successfully waged a rebellion against the rapidly declining Mongol Empire, driving back three separate Mongol expeditions in 1342, 1346 and 1348. By 1355, the Mongols had given up any hope of regaining any control, and had to be satisfied with what they called submission by Mong Mao. The "submission", even if true, was nominal, and freed Mong Mao to concentrate their energy and aggression elsewhere. Si Kefa's first target was Sagaing, which directly south of Mong Mao. The Shan raids now forced Sagaing looking for a closer alliance with Pinya. In 1357/58, Queen Soe Min sent her pre-teen daughter Shin Saw Gyi to Kyawswa, who raised his half-cousin, once removed, to queen.

However, Kyawswa did not command enough manpower to help Sagaing and defend his home region at once. Indeed, when Maw Shans attacked Sagaing from the north in the following dry season of 1358–59, Pinya's southern vassal Toungoo not only revolted but raided the lightly defended Kyaukse capital region itself. The northern operations were no better. By early 1359, Maw Shan forces had broken through Sagaing's territory and breached Pinya's own territory. According to a contemporary inscription, Shan forces ransacked much of his land. The king died on 19 March 1359 during the raids. He had no children and was succeeded by his younger brother Narathu.

Kyawswa II's decree dated 12 March 1359, issued a week before his death, is the earliest known land survey (sittan). The decree ordered lithic inscriptions to check on tax-free religious glebe lands.

== Chronicle reporting differences ==
The royal chronicles do not necessarily agree on his birth, death, and reign dates.

Source	Birth–Death	Age	Reign	Length of reign	Reference
Zatadawbon Yazawin List of Kings of Pinya	c. 1329 – 1364	35 (36th year)	1361/62 – 1364	3	(Note: Zata is inconsistent. (Zata 1960: 42) says Kyawswa I was succeeded by Kyawswa II, Narathu and Uzana II, the same order as reported in other chronicles. But its regnal table in the following page, (Zata 1960: 43), lists Uzana II succeeding Kyawswa I, followed by Kyawswa II and Narathu. Following the order in (Zata 1960: 42), Kyawswa II reigned between 713 ME (1351/52) and 723 ME (1361/62).)
Zatadawbon Yazawin (reconciled)	c. 1329 – 1361/62	32 (33rd year)	1351/52 – 1361/62	10	(Note: Zata is inconsistent. (Zata 1960: 42) says Kyawswa I was succeeded by Kyawswa II, Narathu and Uzana II, the same order as reported in other chronicles. But its regnal table in the following page, (Zata 1960: 43), lists Uzana II succeeding Kyawswa I, followed by Kyawswa II and Narathu. Following the order in (Zata 1960: 42), Kyawswa II reigned between 713 ME (1351/52) and 723 ME (1361/62).)
Maha Yazawin	c. 1322 – 1361/62	39 (40th year)	1351/52 – 1361/62	10	
Yazawin Thit	c. 1327 – 1359/60	32 (33rd year)	1350/51 – 1359/60	10 [sic]	
Hmannan Yazawin	c. 1328 – 1359/60	31 (32nd year)	1350/51 – 1359/60	~10	(Note: (Hmannan Vol. 1 2003: 384–385): Kyawswa II died 721 ME (1359/60) after reigned for almost 10 years.)
Inscriptions	1327/28 – 19 March 1359	31 (32nd year)	12 December 1350 – 19 March 1359	8	(Note: An inscription found at Pinya dated Saturday, the 1st waxing of Tawthalin 729 ME (Saturday, 25 September 1367) by Kyawswa's chief minister Maha Petteik says King Kyawswa's remains were enshrined in a cave pagoda on Tuesday, the 6th waning of Tagu 721 ME. The date should be the 6th waning of Late Tagu 720 ME (Tuesday, 19 March 1359) as there was no 6th waning of Tagu in 721 ME, which began on 3rd waxing of Kason. Likewise, year 720 ME had two 6th wanings of Tagu: 6th waning of (Early) Tagu 720 (30 March 1358) and 6th waning of Late Tagu (19 March 1359). The next 6th waning of Tagu fell in 722 ME.)

== Bibliography ==
- Kala, U (2006) [1724]. Maha Yazawin (in Burmese). Vol. 1–3 (4th printing ed.). Yangon: Ya-Pyei Publishing.
- Maha Sithu (2012) [1798]. Myint Swe; Kyaw Win; Thein Hlaing (eds.). Yazawin Thit (in Burmese). Vol. 1–3 (2nd printing ed.). Yangon: Ya-Pyei Publishing.
- Royal Historians of Burma (1960) [c. 1680]. U Hla Tin (Hla Thamein) (ed.). Zatadawbon Yazawin (in Burmese). Historical Research Directorate of the Union of Burma.
- Royal Historical Commission of Burma (2003) [1832]. Hmannan Yazawin (in Burmese). Vol. 1–3. Yangon: Ministry of Information, Myanmar.
- Than Tun (December 1959). "History of Burma: A.D. 1300–1400". Journal of Burma Research Society. XLII (II).
- Than Tun (1964). Studies in Burmese History (in Burmese). Vol. 1. Yangon: Maha Dagon.
- Taw, Sein Ko; Emanuel Forchhammer (1899). Inscriptions of Pagan, Pinya and Ava: Translation, with Notes. Rangoon: Archaeological Survey of India.

Kyawswa II of Pinya Myinsaing Dynasty Born: c. February 1328 Died: 19 March 1359
Regnal titles
Preceded by Kyawswa I	King of Pinya; 12 December 1350 – 19 March 1359	Succeeded by Narathu
Royal titles
Preceded by Kyawswa I	Heir to the Pinya Throne; 29 March 1344 – 12 December 1350	Succeeded by Narathu
