= Saw Khway of Ava =

Saw Khway စောခွေး

Queen of the Northern Palace of Ava
- Tenure: 25 November 1400 – c. February 1422
- Predecessor: Saw Omma of Sagaing
- Successor: Shin Bo-Me
- Born: c. 1380s Ava (Inwa)
- Died: Unknown; Ava (Inwa)
- Spouse: Minkhaung I (1400–22)
- House: Ava
- Father: Kyawswa?
- Mother: Saw Myat Ke?
- Religion: Theravada Buddhism

Saw Khway (Burmese: စောခွေး, [sɔ́ kʰwé]) was a queen consort of King Minkhaung I of Ava from 1400 to 1422. According to a stone inscription dedicated by her elder sister Queen Shin Saw, she was a granddaughter of King Swa Saw Ke of Ava.

== Bibliography ==
- Royal Historical Commission of Burma (1829–1832). Hmannan Yazawin (in Burmese). Vol. 1–3 (2003 ed.). Yangon: Ministry of Information, Myanmar.
- Than Tun (December 1959). "History of Burma: A.D. 1300–1400". Journal of Burma Research Society. XLII (II).

Saw Khway of Ava Ava Dynasty Born: c. 1380s
Royal titles
Preceded by Saw Omma of Sagaing	Queen of the Northern Palace of Ava; 1400–1422	Succeeded by Shin Bo-Me
