= Amay Gyan =

Burmese nat

Amay Gyan အမေဂျမ်း
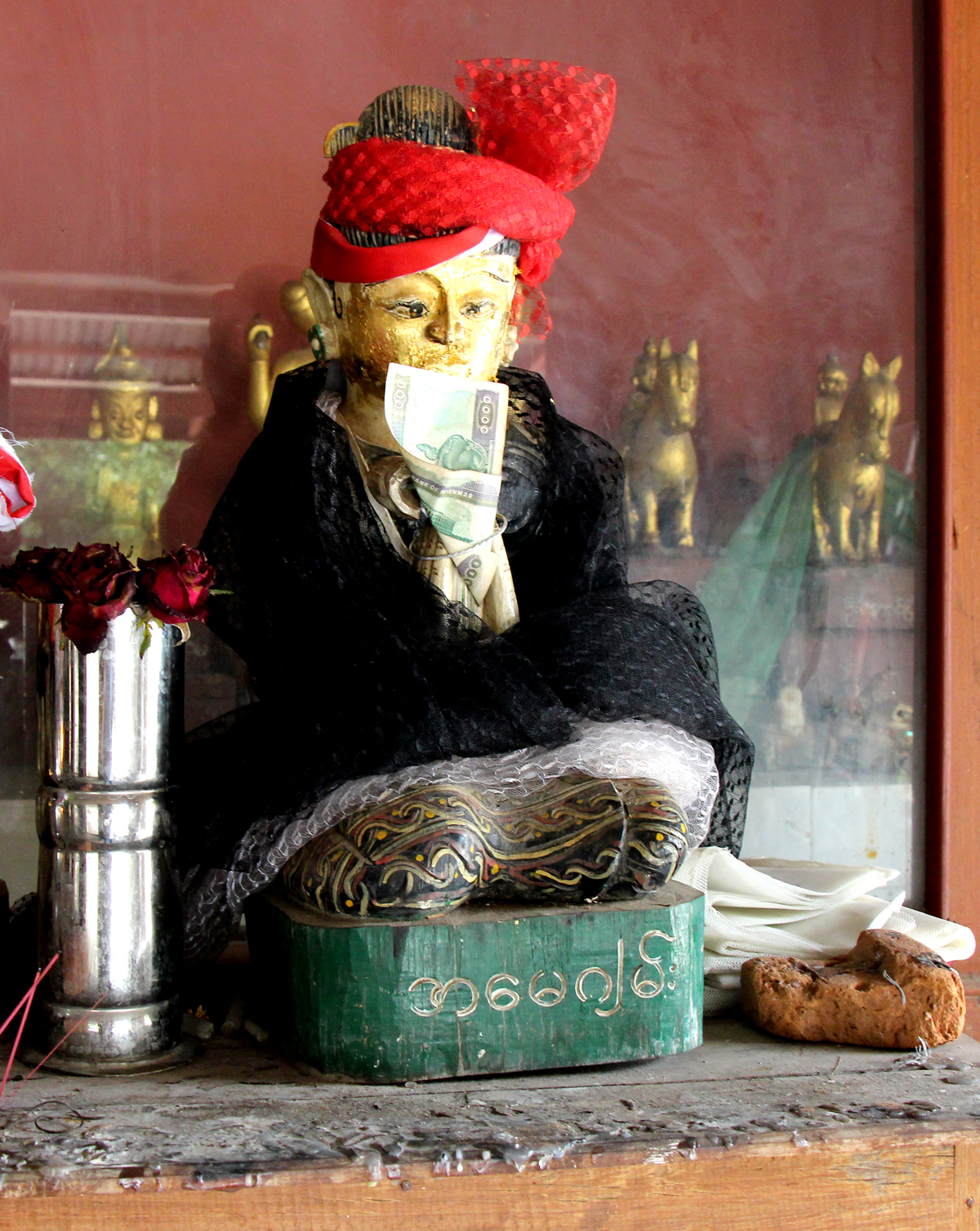
- Amay Gyan statue in the Shwezigon Pagoda
- Born: Chan-Tha; Shwedaung Village; Pinya Kingdom
- Died: Ava (Inwa); Ava Kingdom
- Other name: Ma Gyan
- Occupation: nat
- Parent: Shwedaung village chief (father)

Amay Gyan (Burmese: အမေဂျမ်း; born Ma Chan-Tha, မချမ်းသာ) is a prominent Burmese nat (spiritual being). She is one of the five mother nats of Burma. The festival of Amay Gyan is held each year on the 13th and 14th waning days of the month of Nayon of the Burmese calendar (May or June), in Ayegyigon, Mandalay Region.

Those who visit her are mostly businesspeople, and they offer donations to Amay Gyan while praying for prosperity, fame, good health and good fortune.

== Legend ==
Amay Gyan was born Chan-Tha to the chief of the Shwedaung village in present-day central Myanmar in the mid-14th century. Her family reportedly disowned her for marrying Nga Tet Pya, whom her father deemed a dubious character and a drunkard. After the marriage, she, too, became addicted to toddy palm wine like her husband. One day, a drunken Chan-Tha argued with the guards at one of the gates of Ava, the capital. The argument quickly escalated into a physical altercation after she started cursing at the guards. She was severely beaten up by the guards and died from the injuries. For her courage, she became a martyr to the local populace and later entered the pantheon of Burmese nats (spirits) as a nat named Amay Gyan ("Mother Gyan").
