= Shin Saw Gyi of Sagaing =

Shin Saw Gyi; ရှင်စောကြီး

Chief queen consort of Ava
- Tenure: c. 1390s – April 1400
- Predecessor: Khame Mi
- Successor: Min Hla Myat of Ava

Queen of the Northern Palace of Ava
- Tenure: 5 September 1367 – c. 1390s
- Predecessor: new office
- Successor: Saw Omma of Sagaing

Queen of the Northern Palace of Pinya
- Tenure: 19 March 1359 – May 1364
- Successor: Saw Sala
- Born: c. 1347; Sagaing
- Died: after 1401 (Note: (Hmannan Vol. 1 2003: 435): She was still alive in 763 ME (1401/02) according to a contemporary inscription.); Ava (Inwa)
- Spouse: Kyawswa II of Pinya (1357–59); Narathu of Pinya (1359–64); Swa Saw Ke (1367–1400)
- Issue: Tarabya?; Saw Myat Ke (daughter); Saw Swe Hnit (son)
- Father: Thado Hsinhtein (Note: Chronicles (Hmannan Vol. 1 2003: 392) say that her father's title was Thado Hsinhtein. According to an inscription dedicated on 26 June 1398 (Wednesday, 12th waxing of Waso 760 ME) per (Tun Nyein et al 1899: 164), her father's name is Athincha, Governor of Sagaing.)
- Mother: Soe Min Kodawgyi
- Religion: Theravada Buddhism

Shin Saw Gyi (Burmese: ရှင်စောကြီး, pronounced [ʃɪ̀ɴ sɔ́ dʑí]) was a chief queen consort of King Swa Saw Ke of Ava. She was also a principal queen of kings Kyawswa II of Pinya and Narathu of Pinya. She was a granddaughter of King Saw Yun, the founder of Sagaing Kingdom, and a sister of King Thado Minbya, the founder of Ava Kingdom. She was originally a queen consort of Swa, and was given the title of Queen of the Northern Palace and Pinya in fief. She became the chief queen after Queen Khame Mi died, and became the Queen of the Southern Palace. (Note: Per inscriptional evidence, Khame Mi was still alive on 18 December 1387 (Wed, 10th waxing of Pyatho 749 ME) per (Tun Nyein et al 1899: 152), and Shin Saw Gyi was mentioned as the chief queen on 13 June 1398 (Wed, 12th waxing of Waso 760 ME) per (Tun Nyein et al 1899: 164))

The queen may also be the mother of King Tarabya, the successor of Swa. The Yazawin Thit chronicle, citing a contemporary inscription, states that Tarabya was also a child of Shin Saw Gyi. But the Hmannan Yazawin chronicle rejects it anyway, saying that it was contrary to the reporting by previous chronicles. Hmannan recognizes only two children by her, Saw Myat Ke (Note: (Tun Nyein et al 1899: 164): Saw Myat Ke died in 1398 for whom the king and the queen dedicated a monastery near Tada-U on 26 June 1398.) and Saw Swe Hnit.

== Ancestry ==
The following is her ancestry according to Hmannan. She was descended from Pagan and Pinya royalty. Her paternal side is unreported except that her father was of the Tagaung royal line.

Ancestry of Queen Saw Gyi

8. Thado Kyaukshay
4. Thado Hsinlauk
9.
2. Thado Hsinhtein of Tagaung
10.
5.
11.
1. Saw Gyi
12. Thihathu
6. Saw Yun
13. Yadanabon of Pinya
3. Soe Min Kodawgyi
14. Kyawswa of Pagan
7. Saw Hnaung of Sagaing
15. Saw Soe of Pagan

== Bibliography ==
- Maha Sithu (2012) [1798]. Kyaw Win; Thein Hlaing (eds.). Yazawin Thit (in Burmese). Vol. 1–3 (2nd ed.). Yangon: Ya-Pyei Publishing.
- Royal Historical Commission of Burma (2003) [1832]. Hmannan Yazawin (in Burmese). Vol. 1–3. Yangon: Ministry of Information, Myanmar.
- Tun Nyein, U; Taw Sein Ko; Emanuel Forchhammer (1899). Inscriptions of Pagan, Pinya and Ava: Translation, with Notes. Archaeological Survey of India.

Shin Saw Gyi of Sagaing Ava Kingdom Born: c. 1347 Died: c. 1400s
Royal titles
| Preceded by Khame Mi | Chief queen consort of Ava c. 1390s–1400 | Succeeded by Min Hla Myat |
| New title | Queen of the Northern Palace of Ava; 1367–c. 1390s | Succeeded by Saw Omma of Sagaing |
| Preceded by | Queen of the Northern Palace of Pinya; 19 March 1359 – May 1364 | Succeeded by Saw Sala |
