= Nga Tet Pya =

Burmese outlaw and soldier

- ငတက်ပြား
- Born: Sagaing Kingdom
- Died: Tada-U; Ava Kingdom
- Military career
- Allegiance: Ava Kingdom
- Branch: Royal Ava Army
- Service years: c. 1366–1367?
- Conflicts: Battle of Taungdwin

Nga Tet Pya (Burmese: ငတက်ပြား, [ŋə tɛʔ pjá], also [ŋə dɛʔ bjá]; also spelled Ngatetpya or Nga Tat Pya (Note: (Maung Maung Pye 1952: 52–54) uses Nga Tat Pya for the most part but also Nga Tet Pya in some sections.)) was a 14th-century Burmese outlaw who later became a commander in the royal army during the reign of King Thado Minbya of Ava. A well-known folkloric figure in Burmese culture, he is remembered as a Robin Hood-like character, who robbed the rich, and shared his loot with the poor. He is also known as the husband of Chantha, who is venerated by believers as the Amay Gyan nat spirit.

== Brief ==
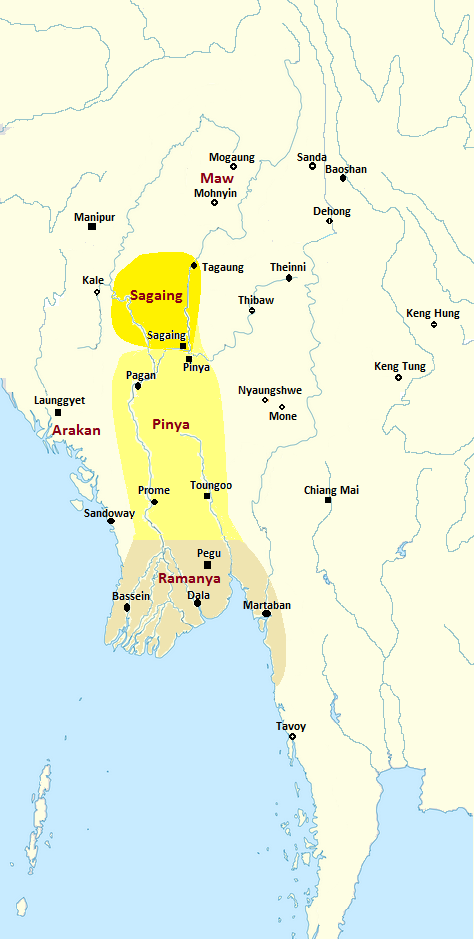
Political map of Myanmar c. 1350, 14 years prior to the collapse of Pinya and Sagaing Kingdoms

While Nga Tet Pya appears only briefly in the royal chronicles, (Note: Only two paragraphs about Nga Tet Pya appear in each of the three main chronicles: (Maha Yazawin Vol. 1 2006: 277), (Yazawin Thit Vol. 1 2012: 182–183) and (Hmannan Vol. 1 2003: 399). The Yazawin Thit and Hmannan Yazawin essentially follow the Maha Yazawin's narrative, almost verbatim.) several folkloric versions of his alleged exploits have been retold in popular Burmese culture. (Note: See (Maung Maung Pye 1952: 52–54) and (Ko Lin 2021) for example.)

=== Chronicle narrative ===
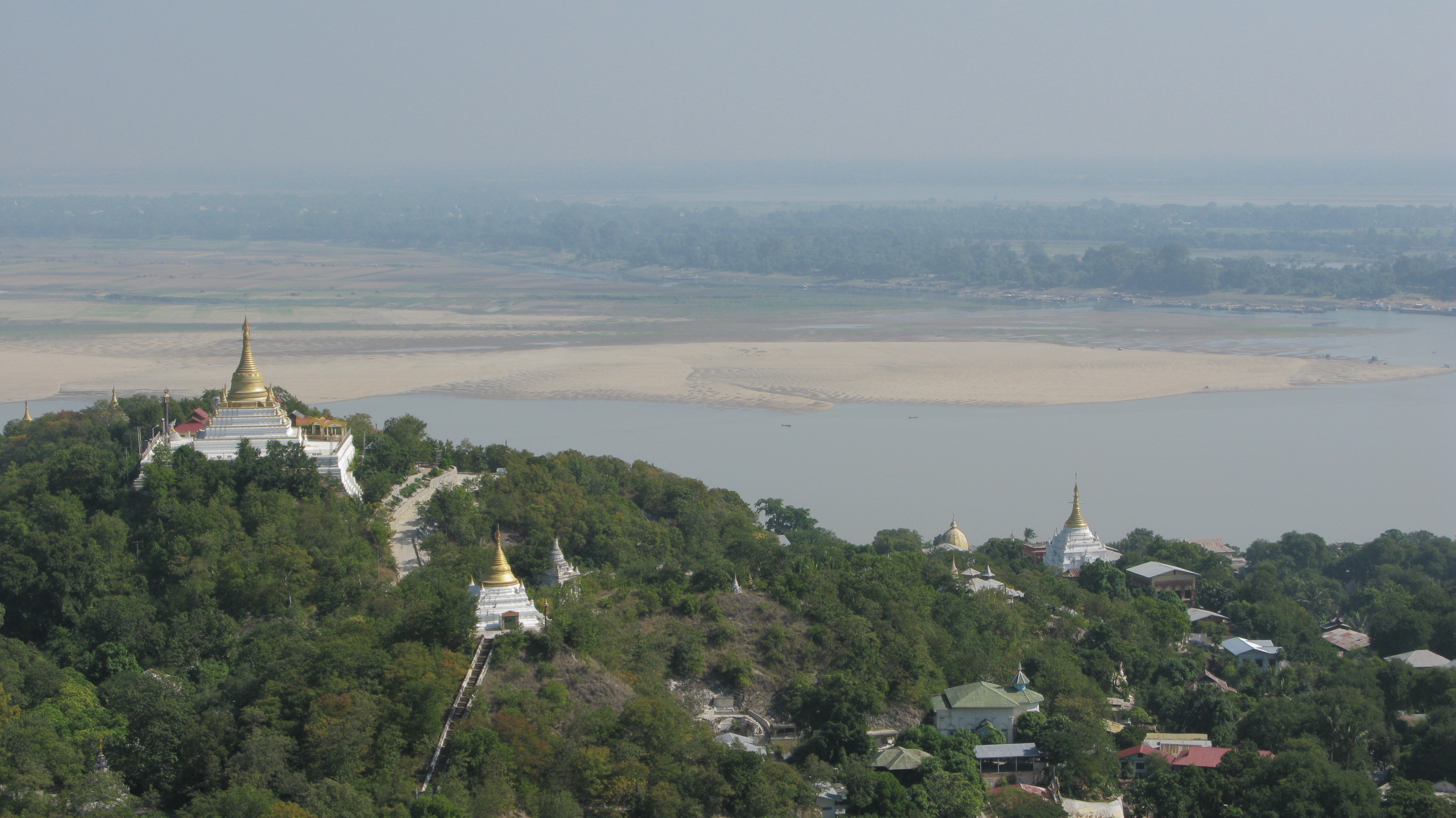
Irrawaddy River as seen from Sagaing Hill, Sagaing

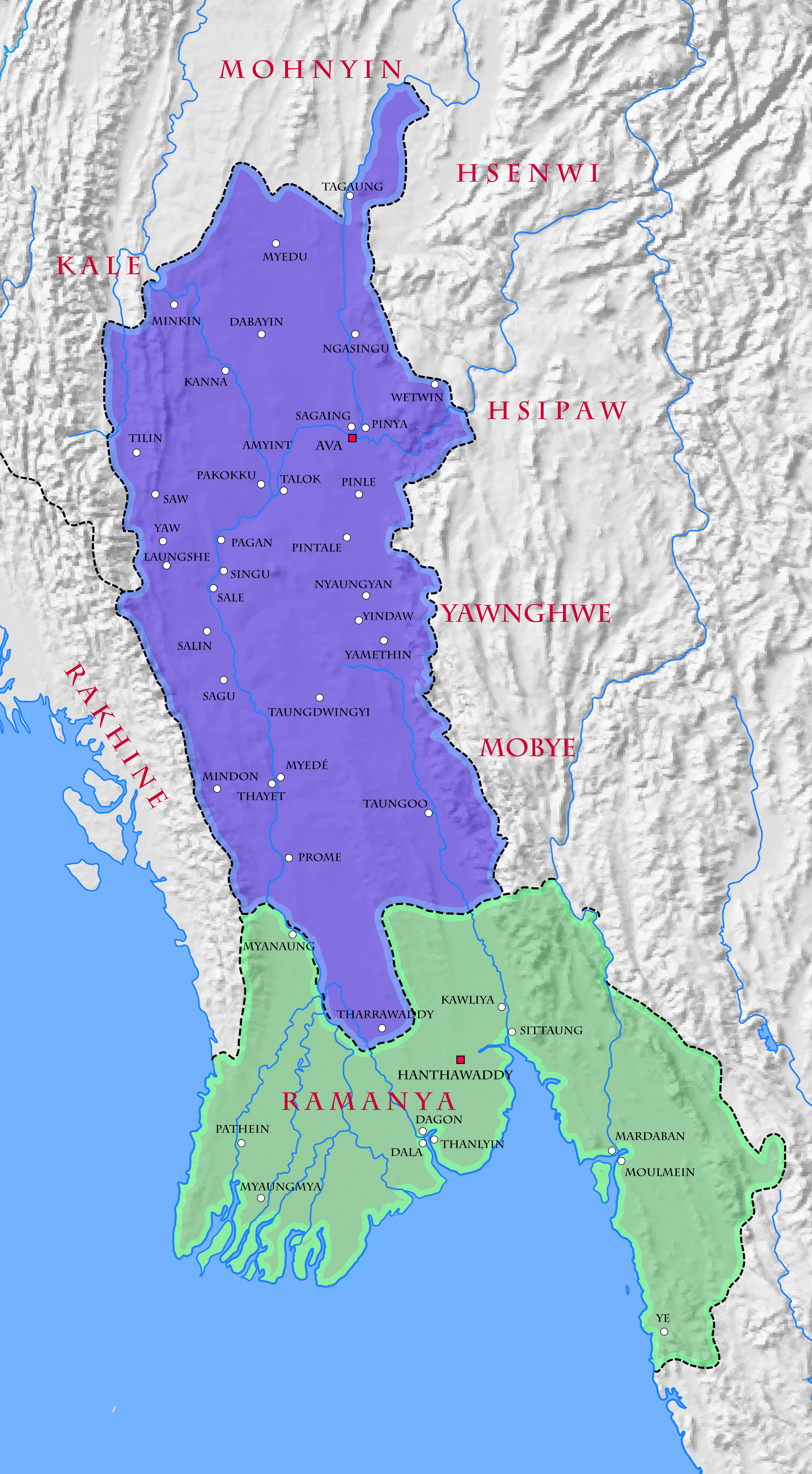
Kingdom of Ava in the late 14th century

According to the chronicles, Tet Pya first gained notoriety in the interregnum period of the mid-1360s in what is now central Myanmar. The rival kingdoms of Sagaing and Pinya had fallen, and a Sagaing prince named Thado Minbya had founded a new polity called Ava, proclaiming it as the successor state of the two kingdoms. Because several southern vassals of Pinya had refused to submit to the new regime, the new king was constantly on the road with his army to suppress the rebellions.

It was during the chaotic times that Tet Pya reportedly committed a series of burglaries along the Irrawaddy in Sagaing, across the river from Thado Minbya's newly built capital of Ava (Inwa). While the chronicles do not explicitly say whose homes were robbed, his victims were apparently high profile enough for the court to take action. He evaded capture for awhile but was eventually caught in a sting operation in early 1366. (Note: (Maha Yazawin Vol. 1 2006: 277) and (Hmannan Vol. 1 2003: 398): Tet Pya was caught after Thado Minbya had returned from the Nganwegon campaign, which took place in 727 ME (29 March 1365–28 March 1366). Since the campaigns took place in the dry season, Thado Minbya most probably must have arrived back from the front in the first half of 1366.)

Chronicles continue that Tet Pya, a mere commoner, nonetheless remained defiant when he was brought before the young king, known for meting out severe punishments. (The king had just returned from the Nganwegon front where he had personally executed the rebel leader Baya Kyawthu, and consumed a meal on the chest of the corpse, shocking even his most battle-hardened commanders.) When asked by the king to choose the weapon by which he would like to be executed, the burglar answered: "Well, I choose your most beautiful queen, Saw Omma." To his surprise, Thado Minbya, instead of being insulted, replied: "You're a brave man. I spare your life. You may go free. You may even join my service." Tet Pya was overcome by the gesture, and became a commander in the army. (According to G.E. Harvey, Thado Minbya's elevation of an outlaw to high office was not common but not rare in Burmese history: "this method of selection was occasionally used as late as 1885".)

At any rate, Tet Pya would prove his worth soon after. In late 1366, he marched with the king and the army to Taungdwin, another southern rebel-held state whose ruler Thettawshay Thihapate had heavily fortified with high walls and a deep moat. When the army's attempts to take the town were repeatedly stopped by Taungdwin's archers, Thado Minbya ordered Tet Pya to assassinate the commander of the archery battalion, who the Ava command believed was the lynchpin of the enemy's defenses. The former burglar managed to scale the walls surreptitiously at night, and killed the commander inside the enemy camp. As expected, the assassination broke the morale of Taungdwin's defenses, and the rebel ruler agreed to submit to Thado Minbya.

Tet Pya is not mentioned in the chronicles again. His patron Thado Minbya died of smallpox less than a year later, and was succeeded by the king's brother-in-law Swa Saw Ke in September 1367.

=== Folklore ===
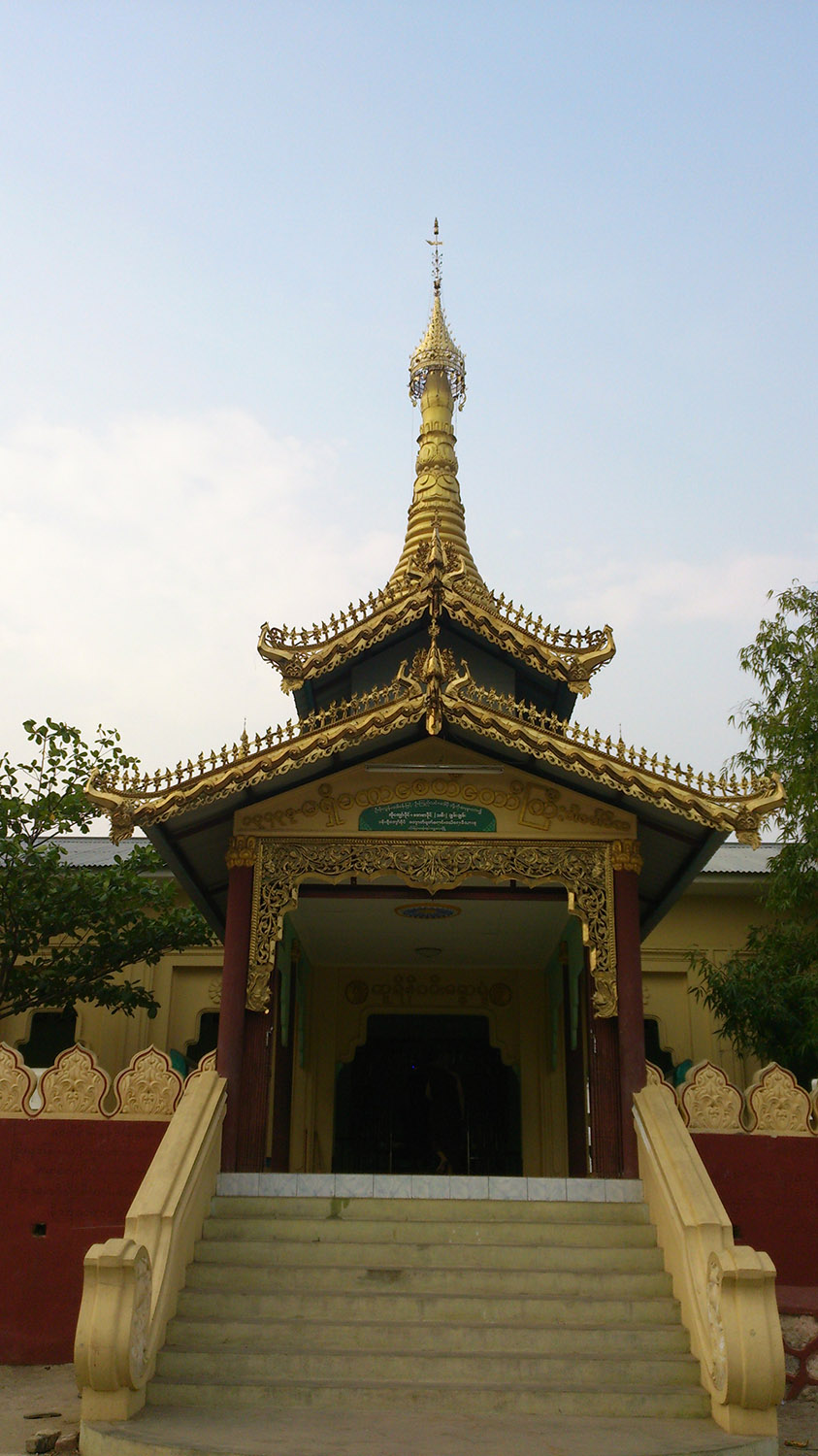
Ma-shi Khana Pagoda founded by Tet Pya

Nga Tet Pya is one of the most well known characters in popular Burmese culture. His exploits are still retold as folklore. He is commonly portrayed as a daring protagonist who robbed the rich, and shared the loot with the poor, and as a cunning escape artist, who repeatedly evaded capture. In the popular narratives, he was robbing in the capital Ava itself, not in Sagaing as in the chronicles. Furthermore, it was the king himself in disguise that captured the burglar.

According to the mainstream narrative, the wealthy and powerful tried their best to capture him but Tet Pya proved too cunning for them. They finally raised the matter to the king, who agreed to catch the bandit. One evening, the king in disguise as a commoner walked up and down the river bank waiting for Tet Pya to cross over from Sagaing. When Tet Pya finally showed up at the river bank after midnight, the disguised king made small talk, and convinced the burglar to have a few drinks at his house nearby. Tet Pya, who had a weakness for wine, agreed, and the two drank until Tet Pya became too intoxicated, and was arrested by the king. The king then found several pieces of stolen jewelry in the large bag Tet Pya had brought. The next morning, the king gave an audience to his ministers, and wore some of the stolen jewelry on his fingers. Though the ministers recognized the jewelry as theirs, they dared not say anything until the king told them that he had apprehended the bandit himself the night before. Tet Pya was then brought before the king and the court. The burglar finally realized that the man with whom he had drinks was the king himself. Here, the narrative merges with that of the chronicles where he defiantly chose the king's most beautiful queen when asked to choose how he should be executed.

Some versions contain more flourishes. In one version, the king not only pardoned Tet Pya but also made him chief of the gold vault of the royal treasury. Another version says during the construction of the Buddhist stupa he is said to have donated, the Ma-Shi Khana Pagoda in his native Sagaing, the funds were constantly running short but Tet Pya always managed to refill the coffers by going back to his old profession.

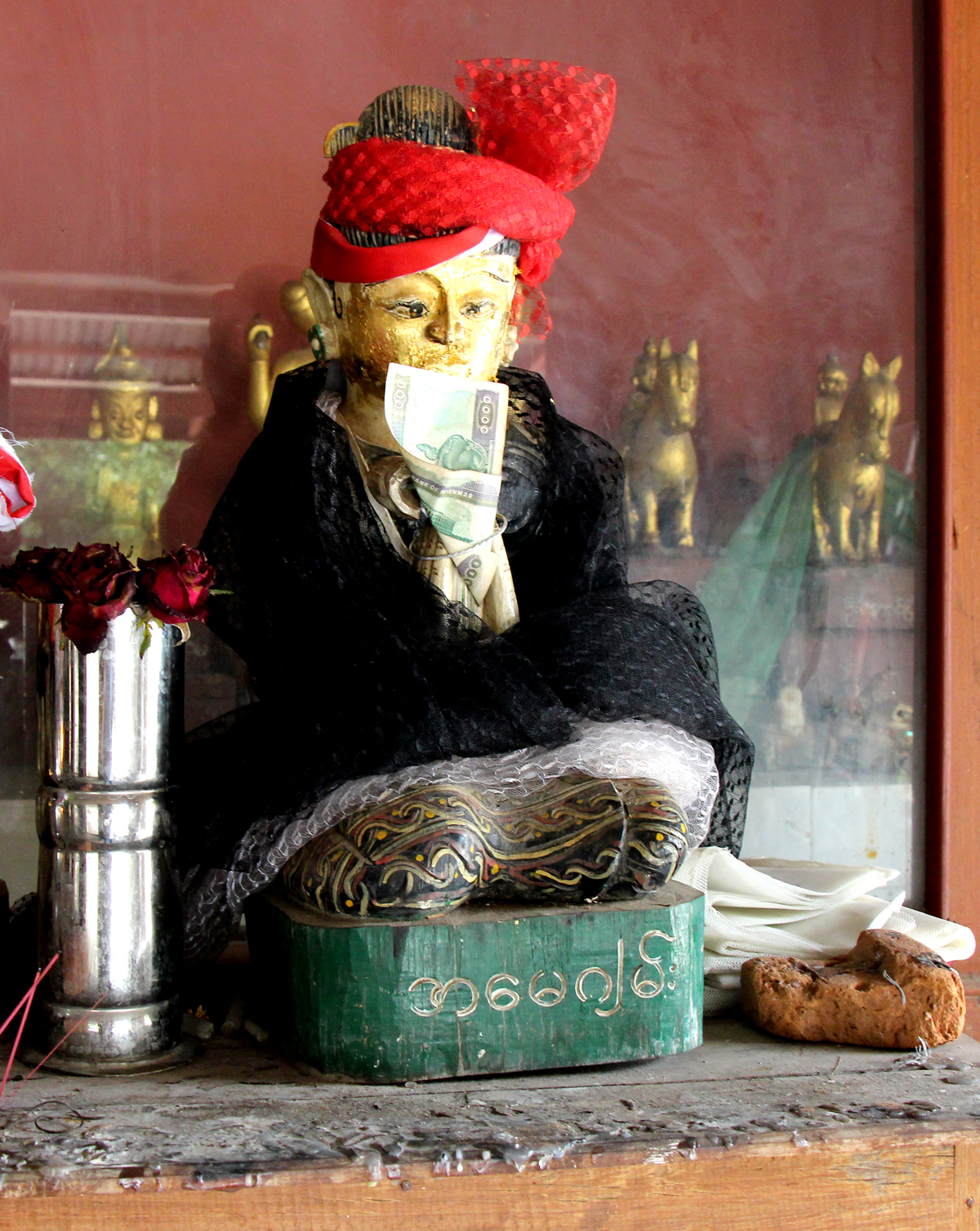
Nat statue of Amay Gyan at the Shwezigon Pagoda

In yet another version, Tet Pya was the husband of Chantha, daughter of the chief of the village of Shwedaung. Chantha was disowned by her family for marrying Tet Pya, whom her father deemed a dubious character and a drunkard. After the marriage, she too became addicted to toddy palm wine like her husband. One day, a drunken Chantha got into an argument with the guards at one of the gates of Ava, the capital. The argument quickly escalated into a physical altercation after she started cursing out at the guards. She was severely beaten up by the guards, and died from the injuries. For her courage, she became a martyr to the local populace, and later entered the pantheon of Burmese nats (spirits) as a nat named Amay Gyan ("Mother Gyan").

== In popular culture ==
Nga Tet Pya's folklore is still widely retold today. He is portrayed as a Robin Hood-like character, who robbed the rich, and shared his loot with the poor. Children's books about his exploits and at least one video game have been published. (Note: See The Adventures of Nga Tat Pyar [sic])

He is also remembered as the husband of the Amay Gyan nat. A festival in her honor is still held near Tada-U in Mandalay Region every year (on the 13th and 14th waning days of Nayon of the Burmese calendar (May or June).

== Bibliography ==
- Aung Tun, Sai (2009). History of the Shan State: From Its Origins to 1962. Chiang Mai: Silk Worm Books. ISBN 978-974-9511-43-5.
- Ba Than, U (1951). မြန်မာ ရာဇဝင် [History of Myanmar] (in Burmese) (7 ed.). Rangoon: Sarpay Beikman.
- Gayet Ni (1979). "The Beautiful Heron". Stories from Asia Today (PDF). Vol. 1. Translated by Tekkatho Mya Thway (1991, First Reprint ed.). New Delhi: National Book Trust, India. pp. 14–20.
- Harvey, G. E. (1925). History of Burma: From the Earliest Times to 10 March 1824. London: Frank Cass & Co. Ltd.
- Htin Aung, Maung (1967). A History of Burma. New York and London: Cambridge University Press.
- Kala, U (1724). Maha Yazawin (in Burmese). Vol. 1–3 (2006, 4th printing ed.). Yangon: Ya-Pyei Publishing.
- Lin, Ko. Nga Tet Pya: A Myanmar Traditional Folk Tale. Yangon: Hsu Pyae Sone Htun.
- Maha Sithu (1798). Myint Swe; Kyaw Win; Thein Hlaing (eds.). Yazawin Thit (in Burmese). Vol. 1–3 (2012, 2nd printing ed.). Yangon: Ya-Pyei Publishing.
- Maung Maung Pye (1952). "Nga Tat Pya [sic] the Daring Robber". Tales of Burma. Macmillan Co. Ltd. pp. 52–54.
- Ne Yaung (26 June 2012). "အမေဂျမ်း နတ်နန်းသို့ တခေါက်" [A Visit to Amay Gyan's Shrine]. The Irrawaddy (in Burmese).
- Royal Historical Commission of Burma (1832). Hmannan Yazawin (in Burmese). Vol. 1–3 (2003 ed.). Yangon: Ministry of Information, Myanmar.
- Than Tun (December 1959). "History of Burma: A.D. 1300–1400". Journal of Burma Research Society. XLII (II).
