= Atula Sanda Dewi of Pinya =

Atula Sanda Dewi; အတုလ စန္ဒာဒေဝီ

Chief queen consort of Pinya
- Tenure: 29 March 1344 – 12 December 1350
- Predecessor: Saw Htut
- Successor: Saw Omma
- Born: c. 1312; Pagan (Bagan)
- Died: in or after 1357/58 (Note: (Hmannan Vol. 1 2003: 385): She was still alive in 719 ME (29 March 1357 to 28 March 1358) when she donated a cave temple.); Pinya?
- Spouse: Kyawswa I of Pinya
- Issue: Uzana II; Kyawswa II; Narathu; Pahtoni, Duchess of Nyaungyan; Duchess of Myinsaing; Shwe Einthe of Paukmyaing
- House: Pinya
- Father: Saw Hnit
- Religion: Theravada Buddhism

Atula Sanda Dewi (Burmese: အတုလ စန္ဒာဒေဝီ, pronounced [ʔətṵla̰ sàɴdà dèwì]; Pali: Atulacandādevī) was the chief queen consort of King Kyawswa I of Pinya. The queen, whose personal name was "Nan Lon Me" (နန်းလုံးမယ်), was a granddaughter of King Kyawswa of Pagan. She was the mother of the last three kings of Pinya: Uzana II, Kyawswa II and Narathu.

== Bibliography ==
- Royal Historical Commission of Burma (2003) [1832]. Hmannan Yazawin (in Burmese). Vol. 1–3. Yangon: Ministry of Information, Myanmar.

Atula Sanda Dewi of Pinya Pinya Kingdom Born: c. 1312 Died: in or after 1357/58
Royal titles
Preceded by Saw Htut	Chief queen consort of Pinya; 29 March 1344 – 12 December 1350	Succeeded by Saw Omma
