= Ma Shi Khana Pagoda =

Buddhist temple in Sagaing, Myanmar

Ma-Shi Khana Pagoda မရှိခဏဘုရား
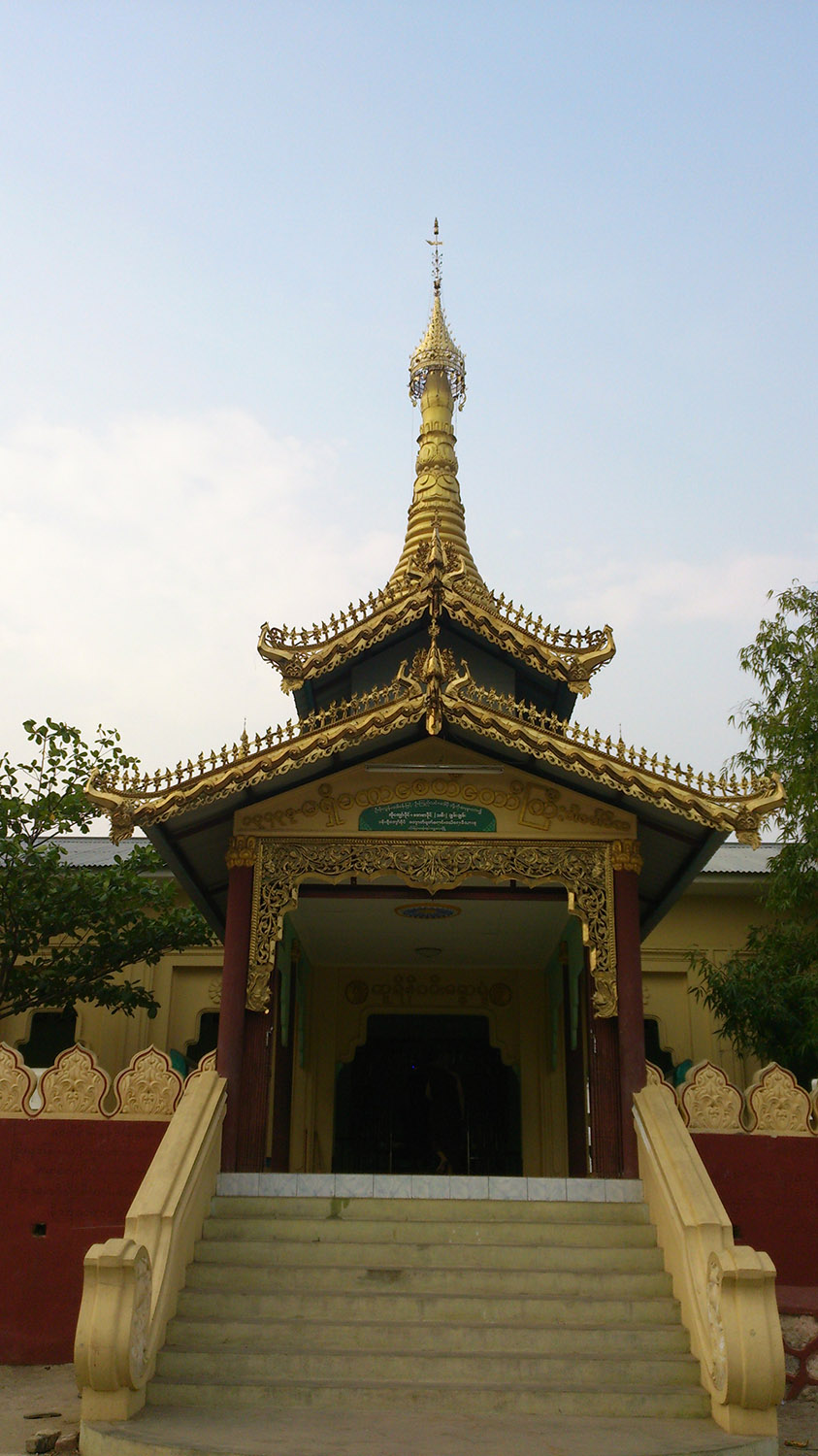
- Temple

- Location within Myanmar

Religion
- Affiliation: Theravada Buddhism

Location
- Location: Sagaing
- Country: Myanmar
- Coordinates: 21°53′12″N 95°59′03″E

Architecture
- Founder: Nga Tet Pya
- Completed: 1360s (during the reign of Thado Minbya)
- Demolished: 2025 (due to the 2025 Myanmar earthquake)

Ma Shi Khana Pagoda (Burmese: မရှိခဏဘုရား) was a Buddhist pagoda located in Sagaing, Myanmar. According to tradition, the pagoda was founded by Nga Tet Pya, a Robin Hood-like character, during the reign of the King Thado Minbya in the 1360s. The building collapsed during the M_{w} 7.7 2025 Myanmar earthquake.

Although initial efforts have been made to manage the site, a full reconstruction of the pagoda faces significant challenges, including Myanmar’s ongoing civil war and political instability.
