= Uzana II of Pinya =

Uzana II of Pinya ဥဇနာ ပြောင်

King of Pinya
- Reign: June – September 1364
- Predecessor: Narathu
- Successor: Thado Minbya
- Born: c. 1324/25; Friday, 686 ME; Pinle
- Died: September 1364 (aged 39); Tawthalin 726 ME; Pinya
- Consort: Saw Omma; Saw Sala
- House: Myinsaing
- Father: Kyawswa I
- Mother: Atula Sanda Dewi
- Religion: Theravada Buddhism

Uzana II of Pinya (Burmese: ဥဇနာ, [ʔṵzənà]; also Uzana Pyaung, ဥဇနာ ပြောင်, [ʔṵzənà bjàʊɰ̃]; 1324/25 – September 1364) was king of Pinya for three months in 1364. He was merely a nominal king, and could not consolidate his power in the wake of the devastating raid by the northern Shan state of Mong Mao. He was overthrown in September 1364 by Thado Minbya of Sagaing.

== Early life ==
Uzana was the eldest child of Princess Nan Lon Me of Pagan and Prince Kyawswa of Pinle. He was born c. 1324/25. (Note: Chronicles imply different years of birth for Uzana II, ranging from c. 1320 (Maha Yazawin) and c. 1322 (Zatadawbon Yazawin and Yazawin Thit) to c. 1325 (Hmannan Yazawin). Hmannan (Hmannan Vol. 1 2003: 386−387) provides an analysis of the reported dates of the Pinya period in the earlier chronicles. Hmannan cites the same inscriptional evidence by Yazawin Thit but gives Uzana's age at death as 39, instead of Yazawin Thit's 42. Assuming Hmannan is correct, Uzana was born sometime between Tawthalin 686 ME (August/September 1324) and Waso 687 ME (June/July 1325).) A grandson of King Thihathu of Myinsaing–Pinya and King Kyawswa of Pagan, he hailed from both Myinsaing and Pagan royal lines. He had five full siblings (two younger brothers and three younger sisters) and at least two half-siblings. He grew up in Pinle but moved to Pinya with the entire family in 1344 when their father became the undisputed ruler of Pinya Kingdom.

Although he was the eldest son, Uzana lived in the shadow of his younger brothers. The king chose his second son Kyawswa the younger as his heir-apparent. The reason, according to the Yazawin Thit chronicle, was that Uzana had weak or crippled legs, and the king deemed his eldest son unsuitable to become king. Uzana continued to be overlooked when Kyawswa the younger became king in 1350 as Kyawswa II. Their youngest brother Narathu became the heir-presumptive, ahead of Uzana; Kyawswa II had no children.

== Reign ==
It is not clear if Uzana's status changed when Narathu became king in 1359. But Uzana's turn came five years later. In May 1364, the raiders from the northern Shan state of Mong Mao (Maw) sacked Pinya, and took away Narathu, along with the loot. The next month, the court elected Uzana as king. The new king, now Uzana II, took his sister-in-law Saw Omma, who had been the chief queen consort of Kyawswa II and Narathu, as his chief queen. He was also married to Saw Sala of Sagaing.

Uzana II was merely a nominal king. He had little authority even in the core capital region. The Maw Shan raids had left the entire Central Burma, including Pinya's neighboring Sagaing Kingdom, in tatters. Like at Pinya, a new ruler, Thado Minbya, came to power at Sagaing. As both Pinya and Sagaing were branches of the Myinsaing dynasty, Uzana II and Thado Minbya were related: Thado Minbya was Uzana II's half-cousin, once removed. Unlike Uzana II, Thado Minbya proved to be an able leader, and quickly consolidated his power at Sagaing. He saw an opportunity to consolidate Central Burma, which had been split since 1315. In September 1364, Thado Minbya and his army crossed the Irrawaddy River, and seized Pinya, apparently without a fight. The new king ordered the execution of Uzana.

== Historiography ==
The various royal chronicles do not agree on his birth, death, and reign dates.

Source	Birth–Death	Age	Reign	Length of reign	Reference
Zatadawbon Yazawin List of Kings of Pinya	c. 1304 – 1361/62 [sic]	57 (58th year) [sic]	1351/52 – 1361/62 [sic]	10 [sic]	(Note: Zata is inconsistent. (Zata 1960: 42) says Kyawswa I was succeeded by Kyawswa II, Narathu and Uzana II, the same order as reported in other chronicles. But its regnal list of Pinya kings in the following page, (Zata 1960: 43), lists Uzana II succeeding Kyawswa I, followed by Kyawswa II and Narathu. Following the order in (Zata 1960: 42), Uzana II reigned for three months in 726 ME (1364/65). Furthermore, the regnal list (Zata 1960: 43) says he died in his 58th year (age 57) in 723 ME (1361/62), implying that he was born in 1304. The error is a result of a typographical error for his father's age at death, listed the row above. According to the list, his father Kyawswa I died in his 64th year (at age 63) in 713 ME (1351/52), implying that Kyawswa I was born c. 1288. But 64th year is a typographical error (probably for 46th year) as Zata itself (Zata 1960: 41) says his parents wedded in 662 ME (1300/01). If Kyawswa I died in his 46th year (instead of 64th year) in 1351/52, he was born c. 1306. And because the regnal list shows that Uzana was 16 years younger than Kyawswa I, the son was born c. 1322. This means his age at death would be 39 (40th year) if he died in 1361/62 as Zata reports, or 42 (43rd year) if he died in 1364 as per other chronicles. The ages of 39 and 42 are significant: Yazawin Thit gives his age at death as 43rd year (42) while Hmannan gives it as 40th year (39).)
Zatadawbon Yazawin (reconciled)	c. 1322 – 1364/65	42 (43rd year)	1364 – 1364/65	3 months	
Maha Yazawin	c. 1320 – September 1364	44 (45th year)	June – September 1364	3 months	
Yazawin Thit	c. 1322 – 1364	42 (43rd year)	1364 – 1364	3 months	
Hmannan Yazawin	c. 1325 – September 1364	39 (40th year)	June – September 1364	3 months	(Note: (Hmannan Vol. 1 2003: 393–394): He came to power in [1st] Waso 726 ME (31 May 1364 to 29 June 1364), and lost power in Tawthalin 726 ME (29 August 1364 to 26 September 1364), after three months.)

== Ancestry ==
Ancestry of King Uzana II of Pinya

8. Theinkha Bo
4. Thihathu
9. Lady Myinsaing
2. Kyawswa I of Pinya
10. Narathihapate
5. Mi Saw U
11. Shin Shwe of Pagan
1. Uzana II
12. Kyawswa of Pagan
6. Saw Hnit
13. Saw Soe of Pagan
3. Atula Sanda Dewi of Pinya
14. (unnamed)
7. (unnamed)
15. (unnamed)

== Bibliography ==
- Kala, U (2006) [1724]. Maha Yazawin (in Burmese). Vol. 1–3 (4th printing ed.). Yangon: Ya-Pyei Publishing.
- Maha Sithu (2012) [1798]. Myint Swe; Kyaw Win; Thein Hlaing (eds.). Yazawin Thit (in Burmese). Vol. 1–3 (2nd printing ed.). Yangon: Ya-Pyei Publishing.
- Royal Historians of Burma (c. 1680). U Hla Tin (Hla Thamein) (ed.). Zatadawbon Yazawin (1960 ed.). Historical Research Directorate of the Union of Burma.
- Royal Historical Commission of Burma (2003) [1832]. Hmannan Yazawin (in Burmese). Vol. 1–3. Yangon: Ministry of Information, Myanmar.
- Than Tun (December 1959). "History of Burma: A.D. 1300–1400". Journal of Burma Research Society. XLII (II).

Uzana II of Pinya Myinsaing Dynasty Born: 1324/25 Died: September 1364
Regnal titles
Preceded by Narathu	King of Pinya; June – September 1364	Succeeded by Thado Minbya
