= Narathu (disambiguation) =

Narathu (1118–1171) was a 12th century King of Pagan.

Narathu (Burmese: နရသူ) may also refer to:

- Narathu of Pinya, King of Pinya, r. 1359−1364
- Min Khayi, King of Arakan, r. 1433–1459
