= Saw Omma of Pinya =

Saw Omma of Pinya စောဥမ္မာ

Chief queen consort of Ava
- Tenure: September 1364 – September 1367
- Predecessor: new office
- Successor: Khame Mi

Chief queen consort of Pinya
- Tenure: 12 December 1350 – c. 3 September 1364
- Predecessor: Atula Sanda Dewi
- Successor: disestablished
- Born: c. 1333; Thayet, Pinya Kingdom
- Died: Unknown; Sagaing?, Ava Kingdom
- Spouse: Kyawswa II (1350–1359); Narathu (1359–1364); Uzana II (1364); Thado Minbya (1364–1367); Nga Nu (1367); Yazathingyan Nga Mauk (1367–1400?)
- Issue: none
- Father: Min Shin Saw
- Mother: Shin Myat Hla
- Religion: Theravada Buddhism

Saw Omma (Burmese: စောဥမ္မာ, pronounced [sɔ́ òʊɴmà]) was the chief queen consort of four consecutive kings of Pinya and Ava Kingdoms from 1350 to 1367. Descended from Pagan and Myinsaing–Pinya royal lines, the queen was well known for her beauty, and was selected as the chief queen of the last three kings of Pinya: Kyawswa II, Narathu and Uzana II. After the death of her fourth husband King Thado Minbya of Ava in 1367, she and her fifth husband Nga Nu unsuccessfully tried to seize the Ava throne. Her brother King Swa Saw Ke, who succeeded Thado Minbya, pardoned her but also married her off to the commander who captured her.

== Early life ==
Saw Omma was born Ommadanti (ဥမ္မာဒန္တီ, [ʔòʊɴmàdàɴni]; (Note: "t" is silent in modern standard Burmese pronunciation.) Pali: Ummādantī) to Shin Myat Hla and Min Shin Saw, governor of Thayet c. 1333. (Note: The chronicle Hmannan Yazawin (Hmannan Vol. 1 2003: 403) says she was youngest of six children. The third child, Swa Saw Ke, was born on 16 July 1330 per Zatadawbon Yazawin (Zata 1960: 72), meaning her earliest possible birth year is (late) 1332. The most probable birth year is 1333. She still could have been born in early January 1334 since she was sent to Launggyet with her family on 7 January 1334 per Rakhine Razawin Thit (Sandamala Linkara Vol. 1 1997: 180).) She was a granddaughter of King Kyawswa of Pagan and a grand-niece of King Thihathu of Pinya. The princess was the youngest child of six. (Note: Maha Yazawin (Maha Yazawin Vol. 1 2006: 280) says she was the fourth of six children but Hmannan (Hmannan Vol. 1 2003: 403–404) corrects it, saying she was the youngest child of six.) Her siblings included Governor Shwe Nan Shin of Myinsaing, Governor Saw Yan Naung of Prome and King Swa Saw Ke of Ava.

Ancestry of Queen Saw Omma

8. Narathihapate
4. Kyawswa of Pagan
9. Shin Hpa of Pagan
2. Min Shin Saw of Thayet
10. Yazathingyan of Pagan
5. Saw Soe of Pagan
11. Saw Khin Htut of Pagan
1. Saw Omma
12. Narathihapate
6. Thihathu of Prome
13. Shin Mauk of Pagan
3. Shin Myat Hla of Prome
14. Theinkha Bo
7. Atula Dewi of Prome
15. Lady Myinsaing

The princess spent much of her childhood years in Launggyet, the capital of Arakan (present-day Rakhine State), the kingdom west of Thayet. The Arakanese raided Thayet in early January 1334, and sent the governor and his entire family to Launggyet on 7 January 1334 (2nd waxing of Tabodwe 695 ME). The family was treated well at Launggyet where the children were educated by one of the most learned monks there. Circa 1343, (Note: The Arakanese chronicle Rakhine Razawin Thit (Sandamala Linkara Vol. 1 1997: 181) says the family left Launggyet for Pinya in 705 ME (28 March 1343 to 27 March 1344) but the Burmese Hmannan chronicle (Hmannan Vol. 1 2003: 403) says the family returned near the end of King Uzana I's reign: c. 704 ME (28 March 1342 to 27 March 1343). According to inscriptional evidence (Than Tun 1959: 124), Uzana I's reign ended on 1 September 1340.) the entire family was allowed to return to Pinya where her father was reappointed to his old position at Thayet.

== Queen of Pinya and Ava ==
According to the chronicles, the princess grew up to be a great beauty. On 12 December 1350, Kyawswa II, a second cousin of hers, took over the Pinya throne and married her as his chief queen. Her status as the chief queen was confirmed in a 1356 inscription. (Note: Per a stone inscription found at the Shwezigon Pagoda, King Kyawswa and Queen Saw [Omma] dedicated a building in the Thamen village on Thursday, the 7th waxing of Tazaungmon 718 ME (Thursday, 29 September 1356).) After Kyawswa II died in March 1359, his younger brother Narathu succeeded, and made his sister-in-law, now known as Saw Omma, his chief queen. Narathu came to power just as Shan raids from the north began to intensify. The raiders sacked both Upper Burmese kingdoms of Sagaing and Pinya in April and June 1364 successively, and took away Narathu. Narathu's elder brother Uzana II succeeded and raised her to chief queen. But Uzana II's reign lasted a mere three months. In September 1364, Thado Minbya, who had taken over the Sagaing throne, conquered Pinya, and made her his chief queen.

Though Thado Minbya hailed from Sagaing, he and Saw Omma were related: He was her second cousin once removed. According to the chronicles, the young king, who was at least a dozen years her junior, (Note: Per Zatadawbon Yazawin (Zata 1960: 72), Thado Minbya was born on 7 December 1345 (13th waxing of Pyatho 707 ME).) was madly in love with her. It was not just the king who appreciated her beauty. When Nga Tet Pya, a famous bandit from Sagaing, who stole from the rich and shared the loot with the poor, was captured, brought before the king, and asked of how he chose to be executed, Tet Pya reportedly said he chose Saw Omma, the prettiest queen. (Note: (Htin Aung 1967: 85): Not only did the young king not take offense but he also forgave the bandit, appreciative of the bandit's bravery. Tet Pya was so overcome by the king's graciousness that he entered the royal service, and became the king's most distinguished commanders.)

== In rebellion ==
Her nearly 17-year reign as queen ended abruptly in September 1367 when Thado Minbya died from smallpox on his way back to Ava from a military expedition to Sagu, about 220 kilometres (140 mi) away from Ava. One of the king's close advisers, Nga Nu, quickly sailed up the Irrawaddy River with his men, and entered the queen's chambers. He told the queen that he had come to kill her on Thado Minbya's orders because the king did not want her to be taken by another man. Saw Omma is said to have asked: "Nga Nu, aren't you a man?" The duo then decided to seize the throne. Nga Nu's men killed off the palace guards and maids, who did not agree with the plan. Ultimately they decided to leave for Sagaing, right across the Irrawaddy from Ava. There, the couple proclaimed themselves king and queen of Sagaing, hoping to revive the old Sagaing Kingdom.

However, the pretenders from Pinya did not attract any allegiance from the former vassals of Sagaing. At Ava, her own brother Swa Saw Ke was elected to become king on 5 September 1367. One of his first acts as king was to dispatch a battalion to remove the couple from Sagaing. The battalion was commanded by Nga Nu's elder brother Yazathingyan Nga Mauk. Nga Nu escaped but Saw Omma was caught. In all, their "reign" lasted half a month. Swa spared his sister's life, and married her off to Nga Mauk, who was given Taungbyon and Wayindok, two small regions near modern Mount Popa, in fief, and also made him governor of Sagaing by 1383. (Note: The narratives by the Maha Yazawin and Hmannan Yazawin chronicles are ambiguous; they can be read as Yazathingyan being appointed governor of Sagaing in 1368 or in the early 1380s.: The chronicle Maha Yazawin (1724) mentions Yazathingyan's appointment at Sagaing in two places. Its first mention of Yazathingyan being governor of Sagaing is in the section about the governors of the kingdom that comes right after Swa's coronation ceremony on the new year's day of 730 ME (29 March 1368). Thus, it can be construed that Yazathingyan was also appointed on the same day or shortly after. However, the chronicle just a few pages later states that c. 731 ME (1369/70), Yazathingyan's fiefs were just Taungbyon and Wayindok, and that Yazathingyan was appointed governor of Sagaing only between 742 ME (1380/81) and before 745 ME (1383/84), succeeding Saw Me.; The Yazawin Thit chronicle (1798) tries to clarify the confusing narrative of the Maha Yazawin. It says King Swa gave his second ranked queen Saw Omma of Sagaing [not his sister Saw Omma of Pinya] Sagaing in fief in Tabaung 729 ME (February/March 1368). It continues that Swa appointed Yazathingyan to the Sagaing post only between 742 ME (1380/81) and before 745 ME (1383/84), succeeding Saw Me.; The Hmannan Yazawin (1832) simply follows the Maha Yazawin's ambiguous narrative.; Historian Michael Aung-Thwin places Yazathingyan's appointment in 1367/68 as part of Swa's coronation ceremony, citing the Maha Yazawin's initial narrative.)

In 1400, Yazathingyan attempted to stage a coup against King Tarabya of Ava but died from an accident en route. Chronicles do not say whether Saw Omma was involved.

== Bibliography ==
- Aung-Thwin, Michael A. (2017). Myanmar in the Fifteenth Century. Honolulu: University of Hawai'i Press. doi:10.21313/hawaii/9780824867836.001.0001. ISBN 978-0-8248-6783-6.
- Harvey, G. E. (1925). History of Burma: From the Earliest Times to 10 March 1824. London: Frank Cass & Co. Ltd.
- Kala, U (2006) [1724]. Maha Yazawin (in Burmese). Vol. 1–3 (4th printing ed.). Yangon: Ya-Pyei Publishing.
- Maha Sithu (2012) [1798]. Kyaw Win; Thein Hlaing (eds.). Yazawin Thit (in Burmese). Vol. 1–3 (2nd ed.). Yangon: Ya-Pyei Publishing.
- Royal Historians of Burma (1960) [c. 1680]. U Hla Tin (Hla Thamein) (ed.). Zatadawbon Yazawin. Historical Research Directorate of the Union of Burma.
- Royal Historical Commission of Burma (2003) [1832]. Hmannan Yazawin (in Burmese). Vol. 1–3. Yangon: Ministry of Information, Myanmar.
- Sandalinka, Shin (2009) [1781]. Mani Yadanabon (in Burmese) (4th printing ed.). Yangon: Seit-Ku Cho Cho.
- Sandamala Linkara, Ashin (1997–1999) [1931]. Rakhine Razawin Thit (in Burmese). Vol. 1–2. Yangon: Tetlan Sarpay.
- Than Tun (December 1959). "History of Burma: A.D. 1300–1400". Journal of Burma Research Society. XLII (II).
- Taw, Sein Ko; Emanuel Forchhammer (1899). Inscriptions of Pagan, Pinya and Ava: Translation, with Notes. Rangoon: Archaeological Survey of India.

Saw Omma of Pinya Pinya Kingdom Born: 1333
Royal titles
New title	Chief queen consort of Ava; September 1364 – September 1367	Succeeded by Khame Mi
Preceded by Atula Sanda Dewi	Chief queen consort of Pinya; 12 December 1350 – September 1364	Disestablished
