= Saw Omma of Sagaing =

Saw Omma of Sagaing စစ်ကိုင်း စောဥမ္မာ

Queen of the Northern Palace of Ava
- Tenure: c. 1390s – April 1400
- Predecessor: Shin Saw Gyi of Sagaing
- Successor: Saw Khway of Ava

Queen of the Central Palace of Ava
- Tenure: 5 September 1367 – c. 1390s
- Predecessor: new office
- Successor: Saw Taw Oo of Sagaing
- Born: c. 1349; Sagaing
- Died: Unknown; Ava (Inwa)
- Spouse: Swa Saw Ke
- Issue: Saw Chantha (daughter); Kyawswa (son)
- Father: Thado Hsinhtein (Note: Chronicles (Hmannan Vol. 1 2003: 392) say that her father's title was Thado Hsinhtein. According to an inscription dedicated on 26 June 1398 (Wednesday, 12th waxing of Waso 760 ME) per (Taw, Frorchhammer 1899: 164), her father's name is Athincha, Governor of Sagaing.)
- Mother: Soe Min Kodawgyi
- Religion: Theravada Buddhism

Saw Omma (Burmese: စစ်ကိုင်း စောဥမ္မာ, pronounced [zəɡáɪɰ̃ sɔ́ òʊɴmà]) was a queen consort of King Swa Saw Ke of Ava. She was a granddaughter of King Saw Yun, the founder of Sagaing Kingdom, and a sister of King Thado Minbya, the founder of Ava Kingdom. When Swa became king, Omma was first given the title of Queen of the Middle Palace and Sagaing in fief. When her elder sister Shin Saw Gyi became the chief queen, Omma succeeded her sister as the Queen of the Northern Palace.

== Ancestry ==
The following is her ancestry according to Hmannan. She was descended from Pagan and Pinya royalty. Her paternal side is unreported except that her father was of the Tagaung royal line.

Ancestry of Queen Saw Omma of Sagaing

8. Thado Kyaukshay
4. Thado Hsinlauk
9.
2. Thado Hsinhtein of Tagaung
10.
5.
11.
1. Omma
12. Thihathu
6. Saw Yun
13. Yadanabon of Pinya
3. Soe Min Kodawgyi
14. Kyawswa of Pagan
7. Saw Hnaung of Sagaing
15. Saw Soe of Pagan

== Bibliography ==
- Maha Sithu (2012) [1798]. Kyaw Win; Thein Hlaing (eds.). Yazawin Thit (in Burmese). Vol. 1–3 (2nd ed.). Yangon: Ya-Pyei Publishing.
- Royal Historical Commission of Burma (2003) [1832]. Hmannan Yazawin (in Burmese). Vol. 1–3. Yangon: Ministry of Information, Myanmar.
- Taw, Sein Ko; Emanuel Forchhammer (1899). Inscriptions of Pagan, Pinya and Ava: Translation, with Notes. Archaeological Survey of India.

Saw Omma of Sagaing Ava Kingdom Born: c. 1349 Died: c. 15th century
Royal titles
Preceded by Shin Saw Gyi	Queen of the Northern Palace of Ava c. 1390s–1400	Succeeded by Saw Khway of Ava
New title	Queen of the Central Palace of Ava; 1367–c. 1390s	Succeeded by Saw Taw Oo of Sagaing
