= Thado Hsinhtein of Tagaung =

Thado Hsinhtein သတိုးဆင်ထိန်း Athinkhaya of Tagaung

Governor of Sagaing
- Reign: c. 1340 – 1351/52

Viceroy of Tagaung
- Reign: c. 1340 – 1351
- Predecessor: Thado Hsinlauk
- Successor: Thado Minbya
- Born: c. 1320; Tagaung
- Died: c. 1351; Sagaing
- Spouse: Soe Min Kodawgyi (1335/36−51)
- Issue: Thado Minbya; Shin Saw Gyi; Saw Omma
- Father: Thado Hsinlauk
- Religion: Theravada Buddhism

Thado Hsinhtein (Burmese: သတိုးဆင်ထိန်း, pronounced [ðədó sʰɪ̀ɴ tʰéɪɴ]; also known as Athinkhaya of Tagaung) was governor of Sagaing, and the father of King Thado Minbya of Ava. The chronicles do not specify his exact lineage except that he was of Tagaung royalty. But according to G.E. Harvey, a British colonial period historian, he was more probably an ethnic Shan noble of Tagaung, who claimed descent from the ancient Tagaung royalty. The Zatadawbon Yazawin chronicle lists him as the 14th ruler of Tagaung.

Moreover, the chronicles do not say that he was governor of Sagaing. It was per an inscription dedicated by his daughter Queen Shin Saw Gyi and her husband King Swa Saw Ke of Ava on 26 June 1398. The inscription refers to him as Athincha (Athinkhaya), governor of Sagaing. (Note: Given as Athincha in Old Burmese in (Taw, Forchhammer 1899: 164), which in modern Burmese is Athinkhaya.) Since Sagaing was the capital of Sagaing Kingdom, his "governorship" of Sagaing may have been a mere mayoralty. It may have been a titular office created to suit his status as the husband of Princess Soe Min Kodawgyi, the daughter of the founder of the kingdom.

== Bibliography ==
- Harvey, G. E. (1925). History of Burma: From the Earliest Times to 10 March 1824. London: Frank Cass & Co. Ltd.
- Royal Historians of Burma (1960) [c. 1680]. U Hla Tin (Hla Thamein) (ed.). Zatadawbon Yazawin (in Burmese). Historical Research Directorate of the Union of Burma.
- Royal Historical Commission of Burma (2003) [1832]. Hmannan Yazawin (in Burmese). Vol. 1–3. Yangon: Ministry of Information, Myanmar.
- Tun Nyein, U; Taw Sein Ko; Emanuel Forchhammer (1899). Inscriptions of Pagan, Pinya and Ava: Translation, with Notes. Archaeological Survey of India.

Thado Hsinhtein of Tagaung Sagaing Kingdom Born: c. 1320 Died: c. 1351
Regnal titles
Preceded by	Governor of Sagaing c. 1340 – 1351	Succeeded by
Preceded by Thado Hsinlauk	Viceroy of Tagaung c. 1340 – 1351	Succeeded by Thado Minbya
