= Thado Minbya =

First monarch of the Kingdom of Ava in present-day Myanmar (Burma)

Thado Minbya; သတိုးမင်းဖျား
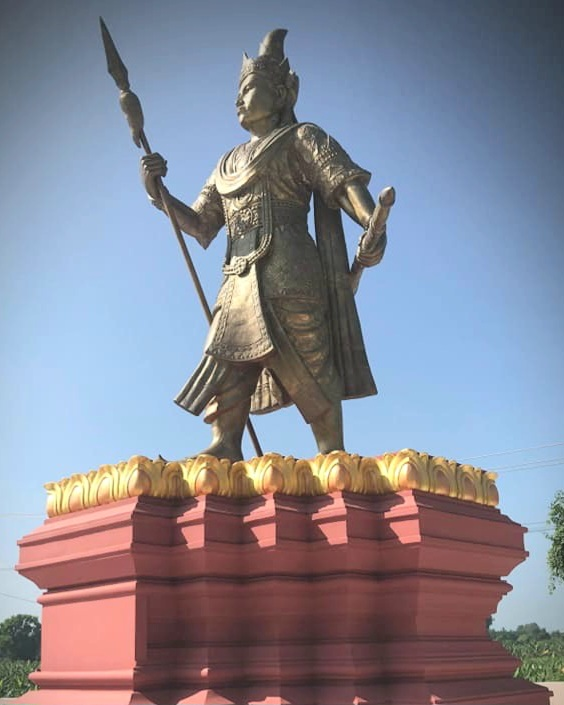
- Bronze statue of Thadominbya at Inwa administered by Sitagu Sayadaw

King of Ava
- Reign: 25 February 1365 – c. 3 September 1367
- Predecessor: new office
- Successor: Swa Saw Ke
- Senior Minister: Yazathingyan

King of Pinya
- Reign: by 26 September 1364 – 25 February 1365
- Predecessor: Uzana II of Pinya
- Successor: disestablished

King of Sagaing
- Reign: by 30 May 1364 – 25 February 1365
- Predecessor: Thihapate of Sagaing
- Successor: disestablished

Governor of Tagaung
- Reign: 1360/61 – 1363/64
- Predecessor: Thado Hsinhtein
- Successor: Thihapate of Tagaung
- Born: 7 December 1345; Wednesday, 13th waxing of Pyatho 707 ME; Sagaing, Sagaing Kingdom
- Died: c. 3 September 1367 (aged 21) c. Friday, 9th waxing of Tawthalin 729 ME; Swegyo, Ava Kingdom
- Consort: Saw Omma
- Issue: none
- House: Sagaing
- Father: Thado Hsinhtein
- Mother: Soe Min Kodawgyi
- Religion: Theravada Buddhism

Thado Minbya (Burmese: သတိုးမင်းဖျား, pronounced [ðədó mɪ́ɰ̃bjá]; 7 December 1345 – c. 3 September 1367) was the founder of the Kingdom of Ava. In his three plus years of reign (1364–67), the king laid the foundation for the reunification of Central Burma, which had been split into Pinya and Sagaing kingdoms since 1315. He also founded the capital city of Ava (Inwa) in 1365, which would remain the country's capital for most of the following five centuries. The young king restored order in central Burma, and tried to stamp out corrupt Buddhist clergy. He died of smallpox while on a southern military expedition in September 1367.

The 21-year-old king left no heirs. He was succeeded by his brother-in-law Swa Saw Ke.

== Early life ==
Thado Minbya was born Rahula to Princess Soe Min Kodawgyi of Sagaing and Viceroy Thado Hsinhtein of Tagaung in 1345. From his mother's side, he was a grandson of King Saw Yun, the founder of the Sagaing Kingdom, and nephew of then reigning king Kyaswa as well as a great grandson of King Thihathu of Pinya and King Kyawswa of Pagan. From his father's side, he was descended from a line of hereditary rulers of Tagaung from the House of Thado. (Note: The Zatadawbon Yazawin chronicle (Zata 1960: 35) lists his father as the 14th ruler of Tagaung, from the House of Thado. (Hardiman 1900: 147): Per Maha Yazawin, the title of Thado was created in memory of Crown Prince Thado Mingyi of Tagaung. Thado means courage and ability to accomplish per Zawti-tatta Bedin Kyan; and glory, industry, wisdom and efficiency per Abidan Kyan.) According to British colonial period scholarship, his father was an ethnic Shan and his mother was mostly Shan; however some have argued that no extant chronicle or archaeological evidence supports the conjecture. (Note: Colonial period scholarship claimed that Thado Minbya's parents were Shan. The 19th century historian Arthur Purves Phayre (Phayre 1967: 59) wrote that Thado Minbya's father was of unknown descent while his mother was mostly Shan. G.E. Harvey (Harvey 1925: 78–80) went further, saying that Thado Minbya's father too was ethnically Shan. Per Michael Aung-Thwin (Aung-Thwin 1996: 884–885), Arthur Phayre was the first one to make the assertion, based purely on the chronicles' use of sawbwa, equating the office with ethnicity; and Harvey (Harvey 1925: 76) inserted the word "Shan", in what he claimed was the direct quote from Hmannan, which says no such thing. In all, no historical evidence of any kind (in Burmese, Shan or anything else) that indicates the ethnicity of their father or the three brothers exists. Moreover, Michael Aung-Thwin and Matrii Aung-Thwin (Aung-Thwin and Aung-Thwin 2012: 109) argue that "Not a single inscription recovered so far erected by royalty or commoner, not a single stanza of verse (of many) composed and not a single sentence in any royal edict proclaimed, administrative and provincial record submitted, legal code compiled, cadastral survey taken, political or religious treatise produced or religious donation made during the Ava period was written the Shan (or Tai) language. All genres of writing at all levels of society throughout the entire kingdom during its life (and beyond) were written in Old Burmese.") The prince had two younger sisters: Shin Saw Gyi and Saw Omma. His father died soon after the birth of Saw Omma. His mother remarried to Thihapate, a grandnephew of Queen Pwa Saw of Pagan. In 1352, Thihapate became king of Sagaing.

Prince Rahula grew up in Sagaing during the small kingdoms period of Myanmar (Burma). The country had disintegrated into several small kingdoms since the fall of the Pagan Empire in 1287. Central Burma itself had been split into two rival kingdoms, Sagaing and Pinya, and ruled by two rival branches of the House of Myinsaing since 1315. Sagaing ruled north and west of the Irrawaddy while Pinya ruled south and east of the main artery. The two states were never too strong to begin with but starting in 1359, they began to face a serious existential threat in the form of massive raids from the northern Shan State of Maw. In response, King Thihapate appointed his 15-year-old stepson governor of Tagaung, the northernmost territory, 200 km north of Sagaing, with the title of Thado Minbya. The king reasoned that it was a suitable appointment as Thado Minbya's father had been the hereditary ruler of the garrison town.

== Governor of Tagaung ==
At Tagaung, the teenage prince could do little to stem the raids. According to a contemporary inscription, the raiders penetrated as far south as Pinya in 1362–63. They came again in the following dry season, this time determined to take both Tagaung and Sagaing. It was part of the agreement between the Maw sawbwa Tho-Chi-Bwa and King Narathu of Pinya to jointly dismember Sagaing. Thado Minbya led the defense of Tagaung but due to a great disparity in manpower as well as cavalry and elephants, the fort fell. Thado Minbya barely escaped, arriving at Sagaing on a single war elephant.

Thado Minbya found no reprieve at Sagaing. He was promptly sent to prison by Thihapate for having lost Tagaung. The young prince had argued that the king needed his help in defending Sagaing itself but to no avail. He was imprisoned at Kya-Khat-Wa-Ya (ကြခတ်ဝရာ), (Note: This Kya-Khat-Wa-Ya was a different place from the more well known Kya-Khat-Wa-Ya which per (Yazawin Thit Vol. 1 2012: 176, footnote 5) was located in Toungoo District. In 1364, Toungoo was an independent state, in revolt of its former overlord Pinya since 1358. It was far away from Sagaing, and Kya-Khat-Wa-Ya of Toungoo District could not have been a Sagaing vassal.) a town on the Irrawaddy south of Sagaing. As expected, the Maw forces came down, and laid siege to Sagaing on three sides. (Pinya forces were supposed to blockade Sagaing's port but failed to do so.) After a few months, in April 1364, the invaders broke through and overran the capital. (Note: (Hmannan Vol. 1 2003: 393): Kason 726 ME = 1 April 1364 – 30 April 1364) Thihapate and his personal guards escaped, and sailed down to Kya-Khat-Wa-Ya. By then, Thado Minbya had escaped and was waiting for his stepfather. The prince had the king executed, and declared himself king, in May 1364. (Note: Chronicles, (Maha Yazawin Vol. 1 2006: 273) and (Hmannan Vol. 1 2003: 393), interlace the fall of Pinya and Sagaing narratives. Chronicles pick up Thado Minbya's execution of Thihapate after the sack of Pinya by the Maw Shans in Nayon 726 ME (1 May 1364 to 30 May 1364, leap day added), and the accession of Uzana II in Waso 726 ME (31 May 1364 to 29 June 1364). But the Sagaing-side and Pinya-side narratives appear to be happening in parallel, and not in a serial fashion. It means Thado Minbya likely executed Thihapate in Nayon (May 1364).)

== Reign ==
=== Founding of Ava ===
Thado Minbya was a mere one of the several "kings" who had declared themselves independent in the wake of the devastating invasion. The Maw forces had looted and pillaged central Burma but returned as the rainy season arrived, carrying off King Narathu of Pinya and leaving central Burma in a power vacuum. Pinya's new ruler Uzana II had little control beyond the capital; Pinya's southern vassals—Pagan, Sagu, Taungdwin, Prome and Toungoo—were in open revolt. Over at Sagaing, Thado Minbya managed to win over the Sagaing court, and reassembled Sagaing's military forces in the next two months. His cross-river rival Uzana II could not do the same. In August/September, he crossed the Irrawaddy with a sizable force, and seized Pinya. He ordered the execution of Uzana II, and declared himself king of Pinya while raising Saw Omma of Pinya, the chief queen of the last three Pinya kings, as his chief consort. (Note: (Hmannan Vol. 1 2003: 393–394): He seized Pinya in Tawthalin 726 ME (29 August 1364 to 26 September 1364).)

Despite his proclamation, the 18-year-old still had no control over Pinya's southern vassals. It is not clear how much control he had over Sagaing's vassals in the north either. Indeed, his first priority was to defend his realm as the threat of annual dry-season raids from the north still loomed. In the next six months, he feverishly built a new citadel at a more strategic location at the confluence of the Irrawaddy and the Myitnge. It was directly across the Irrawaddy from Sagaing, roughly between Sagaing and Pinya and right by the all-important Kyaukse granary. It was the very site that his great grandfather Thihathu initially had wanted to build a new capital before choosing to build at Pinya in 1313. He drained the swamps around the site, and built a new fortified capital. He also gained a much needed respite as Maw Shan raids did not come down that dry season. The initial phase of the capital was completed in about six months. The fortified city was on an island surrounded by rivers and moats. So strategic was the location that Ava would be the capital of successive Burmese kingdoms for the most of next five centuries. On 25 February 1365, (Note: All major chronicles—(Zata 1960: 44), (Maha Yazawin Vol. 1 2006: 275), (Yazawin Thit Vol. 1 2012: 181) and (Hmannan Vol. 1 2003: 396)—say that he founded Ava/Inwa on Tuesday, 6th waxing of Tabaung 726 ME. But by using the standard Burmese-to-Western calendar translator used by Myanmar's Universities Historical Research Center, the date fell on Sunday, 26 January 1365. Furthermore, a contemporary stone inscription dedicated by Thado Minbya himself at the Shwezigon Pagoda on Tuesday, 5th waning of Waso 727 ME, is translated by the standard translator as Sunday, 8 June 1365. However by using J.C. Eade's translator (Eade 1989: 111), the foundation date correctly translates to Tuesday, 25 February 1365, and the Shwezigon inscription date to Tuesday, 8 July 1365. The difference between the two translators in this case is that Eade has 726 ME as an intercalary year whereas the Burmese Universities calculator has 727 ME as a great intercalary year. The Shwezigon inscription shows that 727 ME was not an intercalary year. (Burmese kings did not always follow the standard Metonic cycle, and this appears to be one of the cases.) Also note that the editors of Yazawin Thit chronicle (Yazawin Thit Vol. 1 2012: 182, footnote 2) inserted "2nd" in front of Waso in the footnote #2, in order to get the correct date Tuesday, 8 July 1635. But the actual inscription, whose English translation can be seen in (Taw, Forchhammer, Tun Nyein 1899: 8), does not include 2nd; it reads "Tuesday, the 5th waning of Nweda (Waso) of Tharawun (Saravanna) year 727 Sakaraj". This means 727 ME was not a great leap year, and Eade's translator is most probably correct in this case.) the king proclaimed the foundation of the city of Ava (Inwa), as the capital of the successor state of Pinya and Sagaing Kingdoms. The city's brick walls were completed on 6 July 1365. (Note: (Zata 1960: 61): Sunday, 19th nekkhat of the 4th month of 727 ME = 3rd waning of Waso 727 ME = Sunday, 6 July 1365.)

=== Reunification of Central Burma ===
Thado Minbya would spend the rest of his reign trying to consolidate all of Central Burma under his rule. In early 1365, his realm was still largely in the north, and controlled little south of Ava beyond the Kyaukse region. Pagan (160 km southwest of Ava), Sagu (220 km southwest), Taungdwin (240 km south), Nganwegon (280 km south), Toungoo (350 km southeast) and Prome (400 km south) all remained de facto or de jure independent. (Toungoo had been in revolt since 1358.) However, he did have some advantages: he controlled Kyaukse and Mu regions, two of the three main granaries of Upper Burma; and he had the support of key experienced leaders like Governor Thilawa of Yamethin and Governor Swa Saw Ke of Amyint.

His reunification campaign began at the start of the rainy season of 1365. His decision was likely due to the threat of dry season raids by the Maw Shans. His target was Sagu, capital of Minbu District, the third key granary of Upper Burma. En route to Sagu, he took Pagan, the former royal capital, without a fight, by 8 July 1365. But he could not take a heavily fortified Sagu despite his repeated attempts. He finally had to retreat as he received news that a Toungoo army led by Baya Kyawthu of Nganwegon was raiding the Kyaukse region. Realizing that Toungoo was not about to reunify Central Burma, Thado Minbya marched to Nganwegon (present-day Pyinmana–Naypyidaw), a vassal state of Toungoo, in the following dry season of 1365–66. (Note: Main chronicles do not say that Nganwegon was a vassal state of Toungoo. But Toungoo Yazawin (Sein Lwin Lay 2006: 22) says that Nganwegon was a vassal of Toungoo during the reign of Theingaba; (Harvey 1925: 81) also agrees that Nganwegon was part of Toungoo.) When the army finally took the town, he killed Baya Kyawthu himself, and ate a meal on the corpse's chest—an act that horrified even his most seasoned staff.

Nonetheless, he did not invade further south towards Toungoo. The ever present threat of Maw Shan raids from the north factored into his strategy. He needed to keep his dry season campaigns short. (Maw raids into deep Central Burma would continue until 1368.) In the dry season of 1366–67, he tried to pick off Taungdwin, west of his newly acquired territory of Nganwegon. The conquest of Taungdwin would allow him to isolate Sagu to the west as well as fortify his hold of Nganwegon to the east. When his army could not break the walls of Taungdwin, he sent his newly acquired commander Nga Tet Pya to penetrate inside the fort, and had the key Taungdwin commander assassinated. Tet Pya did his job, and Thihapate, ruler of Taungdwin, submitted shortly after.

In 1367, he decided to take on Sagu once more. His decision was certainly made easier by the death of Theingaba, the ruler of Toungoo, on 29 March 1367. He again marched to Sagu in the rainy season, and laid siege to the city. In early September, the king was seized with smallpox, and had to retreat. But it was too late. He died shortly after c. 3 September 1367 at Swegyo near Pagan. (Note: Per (Than Tun 1959: 128), Swa Sa Ke became king on 5 September 1367. Thado Minbya likely died a couple of days earlier. See (Taw, Forchhammer, Tun Nyein 1899: 7) for the place of death.)

=== Taking on corrupt clergy ===
By the time Thado Minbya came to power, a large percentage of the Buddhist clergy had become corrupt, and the new king was determined to stamp it out. When a monk misappropriated some gold that a poor widow had left in his monastery for safekeeping during one of the Shan raids, the king denounced the monk in the audience chamber of the palace, cut off the monk's head with his own hands, made a hole in the floor with his sword, and kicked the corpse down the opening. The barbaric act had the desired effect on the clergy. Nevertheless, he extended full patronage to orthodox monks and encouraged learning among both monks and laymen.

=== Nga Tet Pya episode ===
The young king was magnanimous even to those who opposed him. For example, when Nga Tet Pya, a popular bandit who robbed the rich and shared his loot with the poor, was captured, the king in full audience asked him:

Scoundrel, your punishment can only be death but because you shared your loot with the poor, I will give you this favor. What do you choose, the sword or trampling by elephants?

The bandit replied:

I choose your prettiest queen, Saw Omma.

The king, instead of being insulted by the reply said:

You're a brave man. I spare your life. You may go free.

Tet Pya was so overcome by the king's graciousness that he entered the royal service, and became the king's most distinguished commanders.

== Succession struggle ==
The 21-year-old king left no heirs. His "most beautiful" queen Saw Omma nearly succeeded in seizing the throne with Nga Nu, commander of the Inner Household Guards. Chronicles say that Nga Nu won over the queen by saying that he had come to kill the queen on Thado Minbya's orders because the king did not want her to be taken by another man. Saw Omma is said to have asked: "Nga Nu, aren't you a man?" The duo then decided to seize the throne. Nga Nu's men killed off the palace guards and maids, who did not agree with the plan. Ultimately they decided to leave for Sagaing, across the Irrawaddy from Ava. There, the couple proclaimed themselves king and queen of Sagaing, hoping to revive the old Sagaing Kingdom.

But ministers intervened and first gave the throne to Governor Thilawa of Yamethin. However, Thilawa refused the offer, and suggested Swa Saw Ke, brother-in-law of both Thado Minbya and Thilawa, and brother of Saw Omma. Swa, a prince of both Myinsaing and Pagan heritage, accepted the offer, and became king on 5 September 1367.

== Historiography ==
The royal chronicles do not necessarily agree on his birth, death and reign dates.

Source	Birth–Death	Age	Reign	Length of reign	Reference
Zatadawbon Yazawin	7 December 1345 – 1368	22 (23rd year)	1364/65–1368	4	(Note: Zata's list of the Ava Kings (Zata 1960: 46) says Thado Minbya was born on a Wednesday in the 10th month of 707 ME. Zata's horoscope section (Zata 1960: 72) says that he was born on 13th nekkhat in 703 ME, which is a typographical error. Burmese numerals ၃ (3) and ၇ (7) can be written similarly in longhand. 13th waxing of Pyatho 707 ME = Wednesday, 7 December 1345)
Maha Yazawin	c. December 1343 – c. December 1367	23, turning 24 (24th year turning to 25th)	by 30 May 1364 – c. December 1367	3 years 7 months	(Note: (Maha Yazawin Vol. 1 2006: 272–273): Minbyauk Thihapate lost power in Kason 726 ME (1 April 1364 – 30 April 1364), and was killed by Thado Minbya around the fall of Pinya in Nayon (1 May 1364 to 30 May 1364, leap day added). (Maha Yazawin Vol. 1 2006: 278): Thado Minbya died in 729 ME, after having reigned for three years and seven months, as he was about to turn 24 (25th year).)
Yazawin Thit	c. 1344 – 1367/68	23 (24th year)	1364/65 – 1367/68	3	
Hmannan Yazawin	c. December 1343 (or 1345) – c. December 1367	23, turning 24 or 21, turning 22 (24th turning 25th, or 22nd turning 23rd)	by 30 May 1364 – c. December 1367	3 years 7 months	(Note: Hmannan is inconsistent. Its obituary of Thado Minbya (Hmannan Vol. 1 2003: 400–401) follows Maha Yazawin's account that the king died in 729 ME, after having reigned for three years and seven months, as he was about to turn 24 (25th year), meaning he was born c. December 1343. But the 1343 date is inconsistent with Hmannan's own reporting elsewhere; (Hmannan Vol. 1 2003: 392) says Thado Minbya was six (in his 7th year) when Minbyauk Thihapate came to power. Since Thihapate came to power on 23 February 1352, Thado Minbya was born in 1345.)

== Ancestry ==
Ancestry of King Thado Minbya

8. Thado Kyaukshay
4. Thado Hsinlauk
9. unnamed
2. Thado Hsinhtein of Tagaung
10. unnamed
5. unnamed
11. unnamed
1. Thado Minbya Rahula
12. Thihathu
6. Saw Yun
13. Yadanabon of Pinya
3. Soe Min Kodawgyi
14. Kyawswa of Pagan
7. Saw Hnaung of Sagaing
15. Saw Soe of Pagan

== Bibliography ==
- Aung-Thwin, Michael A. (November 1996). "The Myth of the "Three Shan Brothers" and the Ava Period in Burmese History". The Journal of Asian Studies. 55 (4). Cambridge: Cambridge University Press: 881–901. doi:10.2307/2646527. JSTOR 2646527.
- Aung-Thwin, Michael A.; Maitrii Aung-Thwin (2012). A History of Myanmar Since Ancient Times (illustrated ed.). Honolulu: University of Hawai'i Press. ISBN 978-1-86189-901-9.
- Eade, J.C. (1989). Southeast Asian Ephemeris: Solar and Planetary Positions, A.D. 638–2000. Ithaca: Cornell University. ISBN 0-87727-704-4.
- Hardiman, John Percy (1900). J. George Scott (compiler) (ed.). Gazetteer of Upper Burma and the Shan States, Part 1. Vol. 2. Rangoon: Superintendent, Government Printing, Burma.
- Harvey, G. E. (1925). History of Burma: From the Earliest Times to 10 March 1824. London: Frank Cass & Co. Ltd.
- Htin Aung, Maung (1967). A History of Burma. New York and London: Cambridge University Press.
- Kala, U (2006) [1724]. Maha Yazawin (in Burmese). Vol. 1–3 (4th printing ed.). Yangon: Ya-Pyei Publishing.
- Lieberman, Victor B. (2003). Strange Parallels: Southeast Asia in Global Context, c. 800–1830, volume 1, Integration on the Mainland. Cambridge University Press. ISBN 978-0-521-80496-7.
- Maha Sithu (2012) [1798]. Kyaw Win; Thein Hlaing (eds.). Yazawin Thit (in Burmese). Vol. 1–3 (2nd ed.). Yangon: Ya-Pyei Publishing.
- Phayre, Lt. Gen. Sir Arthur P. (1967) [1883]. History of Burma. London: Susil Gupta.
- Royal Historians of Burma (1960) [c. 1680]. U Hla Tin (Hla Thamein) (ed.). Zatadawbon Yazawin (in Burmese). Historical Research Directorate of the Union of Burma.
- Royal Historical Commission of Burma (2003) [1832]. Hmannan Yazawin (in Burmese). Vol. 1–3. Yangon: Ministry of Information, Myanmar.
- Sein Lwin Lay, Kahtika U (2006) [1968]. Min Taya Shwe Hti and Bayinnaung: Ketumadi Taungoo Yazawin (in Burmese) (2nd printing ed.). Yangon: Yan Aung Sarpay.
- Taw, Sein Ko; Emanuel Forchhammer; Tun Nyein (1899). Inscriptions of Pagan, Pinya and Ava: Translation, with Notes. Rangoon: Archaeological Survey of India.
- Than Tun (December 1959). "History of Burma: A.D. 1300–1400". Journal of Burma Research Society. XLII (II).

Thado Minbya Ava Kingdom Born: 7 December 1345 Died: c. 3 September 1367
Regnal titles
New title	King of Ava; 25 February 1365 – c. 3 September 1367	Succeeded by Swa Saw Ke
Preceded by Uzana II of Pinya	King of Pinya by 26 September 1364 – 25 February 1365	Pinya Kingdom abolished
Preceded by Thihapate of Sagaing	King of Sagaing by 30 May 1364 – 25 February 1365	Sagaing Kingdom abolished
Royal titles
Preceded by Thado Hsinhtein of Tagaung	Governor of Tagaung; 1360/61 – 1363/64	Succeeded by Thihapate of Tagaung
