= Narathu of Pinya =

Narathu of Pinya မောပါ နရသူ

King of Pinya
- Reign: 19 March 1359 – May 1364
- Coronation: 7 June 1360
- Predecessor: Kyawswa II
- Successor: Uzana II
- Born: c. February 1333; Monday, c. Tabodwe 694 ME; Pinle
- Died: 1364? Mong Mao?
- Consort: Saw Omma; Shin Saw Gyi; Nan Ma Me; Saw Lat
- House: Myinsaing
- Father: Kyawswa I
- Mother: Atula Sanda Dewi
- Religion: Theravada Buddhism

Narathu of Pinya (Burmese: မောပါ နရသူ, pronounced [mɔ́ bà nəɹəθù]; also known as Thihathura; c. 1333–1364?) was king of Pinya from 1359 to 1364. He controlled only around the capital region, and unsuccessfully tried to stop the Mong Mao (Maw) Shan raids of Central Myanmar (Burma) that began in 1359. He reversed his predecessor Kyawswa II's policy of alliance with Sagaing, and later entered into an alliance with Mong Mao as a junior partner to dismember Sagaing. But the policy backfired when Mong Mao forces proceeded to sack Pinya in May 1364. He was brought back to the Shan country, and is remembered as Maw-Pa Min (မောပါမင်း, "the King who was brought to the Maw land").

== Early life ==
Narathu was the third child of Princess Nan Lon Me of Pagan and Viceroy Kyawswa of Pinle. A grandson of King Thihathu of Myinsaing–Pinya and King Kyawswa of Pagan, he hailed from both Myinsaing and Pagan royal lines. He had five full siblings (two elder brothers and three younger sisters) and at least two half-siblings. He grew up in Pinle but moved to Pinya with the entire family in 1344 when their father became the undisputed ruler of Pinya Kingdom. When his second elder brother Kyawswa II succeeded the throne in 1350, Narathu became the heir-presumptive. (Kyawswa II had no children and their eldest brother Uzana had weak/paralyzed legs, and was passed over.)

== Reign ==
=== Shan raids ===
Narathu became king on 19 March 1359, following Kyawswa II's death. He came to power at a time when Pinya was facing serious external and internal threats. In the north, the powerful Shan state of Mong Mao (Maw in Burmese), which had successfully thrown off the Mongol authority in 1355, had been raiding the northern Sagaing Kingdom's territory at least since 1357, and just broken through into Pinya's territory (present-day Central Myanmar) in early 1359. Likewise, in the south, Pinya's erstwhile nominal vassal Toungoo (Taungoo) had not only revolted in 1358 but also raided the Kyaukse capital region. The chaos may have delayed his coronation, which took place on 7 June 1360. (Note: (Yazawin Thit Vol. 1 2012: 170, footnote 4) per the Hsinbyushin Min inscription: Sunday, 8th waning of Nayon 722 ME = 7 June 1360)

One of his first acts as king was to break off Pinya's alliance with Sagaing. It was a complete reversal of his brother's policy but Narathu had determined that Pinya was not strong enough to control its vassals, let alone assist Sagaing in the fight against Mong Mao. Nonetheless, Mong Mao paid little attention to Pinya's newfound neutrality, and its forces raided deep into Pinya territory in 1362–63. In desperation, Narathu sought an alliance with Mong Mao's ruler Tho Chi Bwa (Si Kefa). By 1363, the two rulers had reached an agreement on a joint attack on Sagaing. Narathu was clearly the junior partner, agreeing to take only a small portion of the loot.

=== Siege of Sagaing ===
Narathu was in no position to fulfill his small part of the bargain. Many able men had been fleeing Central Burma since the Shan raids began, and he could not mobilize a large enough army. When Mong Mao forces invaded Sagaing country in 1363−64, Narathu did not attack Sagaing from the south as planned. Mong Mao troops nonetheless overran Sagaing's northern defenses and reached the capital Sagaing in early 1364, laying siege to the capital from three sides. Pinya's job was to blockade the port of Sagaing on the Irrawaddy River. But Pinya's blockade was porous. When Shan forces sacked Sagaing in April 1364, the Sagaing royalty escaped by sailing downriver, and thousands of refugees crossed the river en masse to Pinya.

=== Fall of Pinya ===
At Sagaing, Tho Kho Bwa was deeply unsatisfied with what he considered poor performance by Pinya. He ultimately ordered his troops to attack Pinya across the river. Narathu's small army was no match for the Shan assault. Pinya fell in May 1364. The Mong Mao troops thoroughly looted the capital, and brought back Narathu and his three white elephants back to their country. Narathu is remembered as Maw-Pa Min (မောပါမင်း, [mɔ́ bà mɪ́ɴ]; lit. "the King who was brought to the Maw land"). The 1363–64 invasion left Central Burma in tatters. At Pinya, Narathu's eldest brother, Uzana II succeeded the Pinya throne. But Pinya was a spent force, and lasted only three months.

== Family ==
At accession, Narathu raised his brother's chief queen Saw Omma as his chief queen. According to the Yazawin Thit chronicle, he also raised another queen of his brother, Shin Saw Gyi as queen. Contemporary inscriptions show that he had at least two other queens named Nan Ma Me and Saw Lat. None of the main chronicles report any children of Narathu.

== Chronicle reporting differences ==
The various royal chronicles do not necessarily agree on his birth, death, and reign dates.

Source	Birth–Death	Age at dethronement	Reign	Length of reign	Reference
Zatadawbon Yazawin List of Pinya Kings	c. 1334 – 1364/65	30 (31st year)	1364 – 1364/65	3 months	(Note: Zata is inconsistent. (Zata 1960: 42) says Kyawswa I was succeeded by Kyawswa II, Narathu and Uzana II, the same order as reported in other chronicles. But its regnal table in the following page, (Zata 1960: 43), lists Uzana II succeeding Kyawswa I, followed by Kyawswa II and Narathu. Following the order in (Zata 1960: 42), Narathu reigned between 723 ME (1361/62) and 726 ME (1364/65).)
Zatadawbon Yazawin (reconciled)	c. 1334 – 1364/65	30 (31st year)	1361/62 – 1364/65	3 years	(Note: Zata is inconsistent. (Zata 1960: 42) says Kyawswa I was succeeded by Kyawswa II, Narathu and Uzana II, the same order as reported in other chronicles. But its regnal table in the following page, (Zata 1960: 43), lists Uzana II succeeding Kyawswa I, followed by Kyawswa II and Narathu. Following the order in (Zata 1960: 42), Narathu reigned between 723 ME (1361/62) and 726 ME (1364/65).)
Maha Yazawin	c. 1324 – ?	40 (41st year)	1361/62 – May 1364	3 years	
Yazawin Thit	c. 1328 – ?	36 (37th year)	1359/60 – 1364/65	5 years	
Hmannan Yazawin	c. 1333 – ?	31 (32nd year)	1359/60 – May 1364	5 years	(Note: It can be inferred that he was born in early 1333. (Hmannan Vol. 1 2003: 385) says he came to power at age 26 (27th year). Since he came to power on Tuesday, 6th waning of Late Tagu 720 ME (19 March 1359) per (Than Tun 1959: 124), he was born on or before 6th waning of Tagu 695 ME (5 April 1333). But he was likely born a few months earlier in late 694 ME as there was no 6th waning of Late Tagu of 694 ME; the new year's day of 695 ME fell on the 14th waxing of Tagu 695 ME (29 March 1333).)

== Ancestry ==
Ancestry of King Narathu of Pinya

8. Theinkha Bo
4. Thihathu
9. Lady Myinsaing
2. Kyawswa I of Pinya
10. Narathihapate
5. Mi Saw U
11. Shin Shwe of Pagan
1. Narathu
12. Kyawswa of Pagan
6. Saw Hnit
13. Saw Soe of Pagan
3. Atula Sanda Dewi of Pinya
14. (unnamed)
7. (unnamed)
15. (unnamed)

== Bibliography ==
- Kala, U (2006) [1724]. Maha Yazawin (in Burmese). Vol. 1–3 (4th printing ed.). Yangon: Ya-Pyei Publishing.
- Maha Sithu (2012) [1798]. Myint Swe; Kyaw Win; Thein Hlaing (eds.). Yazawin Thit (in Burmese). Vol. 1–3 (2nd printing ed.). Yangon: Ya-Pyei Publishing.
- Royal Historians of Burma (1960) [c. 1680]. U Hla Tin (Hla Thamein) (ed.). Zatadawbon Yazawin (in Burmese). Historical Research Directorate of the Union of Burma.
- Royal Historical Commission of Burma (2003) [1832]. Hmannan Yazawin (in Burmese). Vol. 1–3. Yangon: Ministry of Information, Myanmar.
- Than Tun (December 1959). "History of Burma: A.D. 1300–1400". Journal of Burma Research Society. XLII (II).
- Than Tun (1964). Studies in Burmese History (in Burmese). Vol. 1. Yangon: Maha Dagon.

Narathu of Pinya Myinsaing Dynasty Born: c. 1333 Died: 1364?
Regnal titles
Preceded by Kyawswa II	King of Pinya; 19 March 1359 – May 1364	Succeeded by Uzana II
