= Pinya =

Pinya ပင်းယ
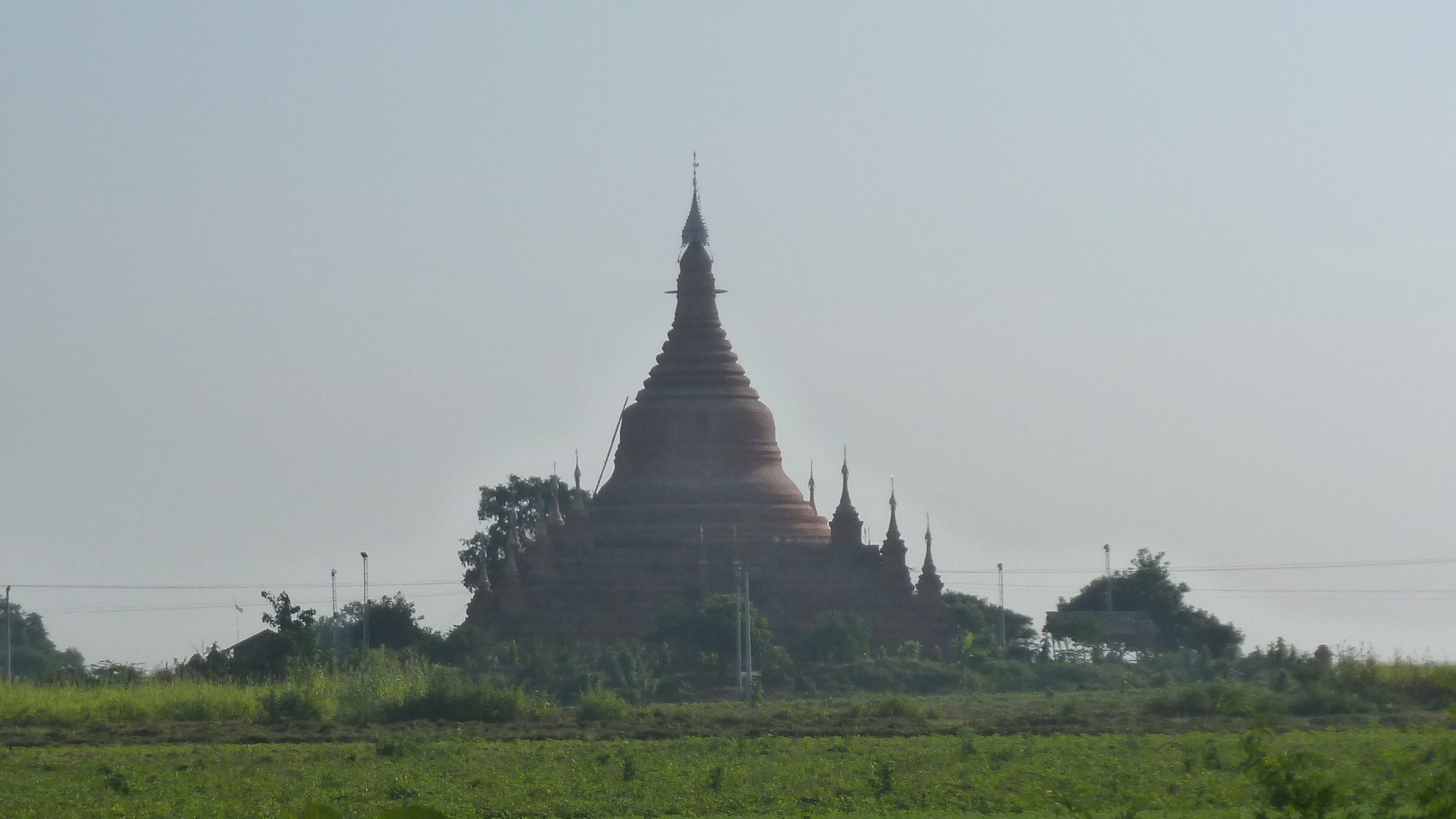
- Old Pinya city site today

- Location in Myanmar
- Coordinates: 21°47′50″N 95°58′28″E
- Country: Myanmar
- Region: Mandalay Region
- Founded: 7 February 1313

Population
  - Ethnicities: Burman
  - Religions: Theravada Buddhism
- Time zone: UTC+6.30 (MST)

Pinya (Burmese: ပင်းယ), or Vijayapura, was the capital of the Kingdom of Pinya, located near Ava, Mandalay Region, Myanmar. It was the residence of the Pinya dynasty who ruled this part of central Myanmar from 1313 to 1365. It was founded by King Thihathu as Wizayapura (ဝိဇယပူရ, Pali: Vijayapura) on 7 February 1313. (Note: (Hmannan Vol. 1 2003: 370) gives Wednesday, 15th waxing of Tabaung 674 ME, which translates to 10 February 1313. But 15th waxing is most probably a copying error since it is highly uncommon to say 15th waxing instead of full moon. The date was probably 12th waxing of Tabaung, which correctly translates to Wednesday, 7 February 1313. Burmese numerals ၂ (2) and ၅ (5) are similar and can easily be miscopied.)

== Notes ==
Pinya
Preceded by Myinsaing, Mekkhaya, Pinle as Capital of Myinsaing Kingdom	Capital of Pinya Kingdom; 7 February 1313 – 26 February 1365	Succeeded by Ava as Capital of Ava Kingdom
