= Kingdom of Ava =

Polity in upper Myanmar (1365–1555)

Coordinates: 21°51′18″N 95°58′45″E

Ava Kingdom အင်းဝပြည်
- 1365–1555
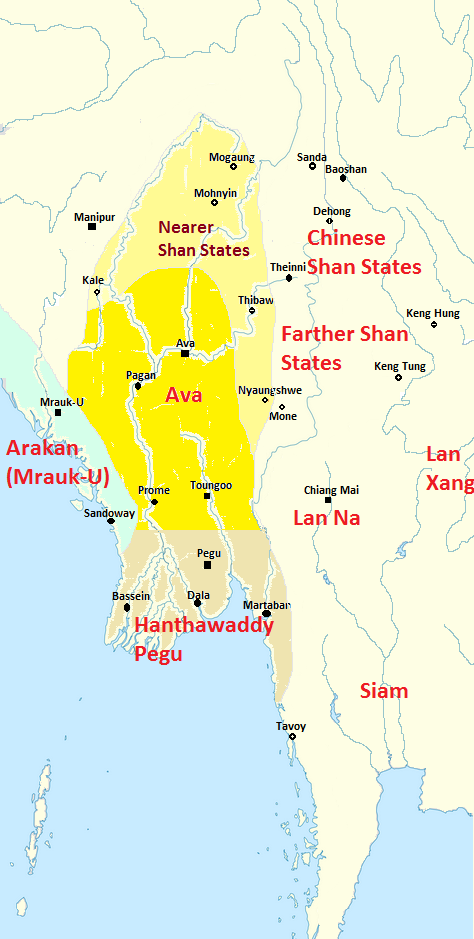
- Ava c. 1450
- Status: Kingdom
- Capital: Sagaing; Pinya; Ava
- Common languages: Burmese, Shan
- Religion: Theravada Buddhism
- Government: Monarchy
  - 1364–1367: Thado Minbya
  - 1367–1400: Swa Saw Ke
  - 1400–1421: Minkhaung I
  - 1426–1439: Mohnyin Thado
  - 1527–1542: Thohanbwa
  - 1551–1555: Sithu Kyawhtin
- Legislature: None (Rule by decree)
- History
  - Thado Minbya seized Sagaing: by 30 May 1364
  - Kingdom of Ava founded: 26 February 1365
  - Saw Omma's rebellion: September 1367
  - Forty Years' War: 1385–1424
  - Start of House of Mohnyin: 16 May 1426
  - Toungoo secession: 16 October 1510
  - Start of Shan period: 14 March 1527
  - Toungoo conquest: 22 January 1555
- Currency: Silver
Preceded by	Succeeded by
Pinya Kingdom; Sagaing Kingdom	Toungoo Dynasty; Prome Kingdom
- Today part of: Myanmar

The Ava Kingdom (Burmese: အင်းဝပြည်, pronounced [ʔɪ́ɰ̃wa̰ kʰɪʔ]; INN-wa pyi) also known as Inwa Kingdom or Kingdom of Ava was the dominant kingdom that ruled upper Burma (Myanmar) from 1365 to 1555. Founded in 1365, the kingdom was the successor state to the petty kingdoms of Myinsaing, Pinya and Sagaing that had ruled central Burma since the collapse of the Pagan Kingdom in the late 13th century.

Like the small kingdoms that preceded it, Ava may have been led by Bamarised Shan kings who claimed descent from the kings of Pagan. Scholars debate that the Shan ethnicity of Avan kings comes from mistranslation, particularly from a record of the Avan kings' ancestors ruling a Shan village in central Burma prior to their rise or prominence.

== Names ==
The Burmese name for the Kingdom is အင်းဝနေပြည်တော် (Inwa Naypyidaw) which is equivalent to Ava Kingdom in English language.

== History ==
The kingdom was founded by Thado Minbya in 1364 following the collapse of the Sagaing and Pinya Kingdoms due to raids by the Shan States to the north.

In its first years of existence, Ava, which viewed itself as the rightful successor to the Pagan Kingdom, tried to reassemble the former empire by waging constant wars against the Mon Hanthawaddy kingdom in the south, the Shan States in the north and east, and Rakhine State in the west.

While it was able to hold Taungoo and some peripheral Shan States (Kalaymyo, Mohnyin, Mogaung and Hsipaw) within its fold at the peak of its power, Ava failed to reconquer the rest. The Forty Years' War (1385–1424) with Hanthawaddy left Ava exhausted. From the 1420s to early 1480s, Ava regularly faced rebellions in its vassal regions whenever a new king came to power. In the 1480s and 1490s, the Prome Kingdom in the south and the Shan states that were under the sway of Ava in the north had broken away, and the Taungoo dynasty became as powerful as its nominal overlord Ava. In 1510, Taungoo also broke away.

Ava was under intensified Shan raids for the first quarter of the 16th century. In 1527, the Confederation of Shan States, led by the state of Mohnyin in alliance with Prome, sacked Ava. The Confederation placed nominal kings on the Ava throne and ruled much of Upper Burma. As Prome was in alliance with the Confederation, only the tiny Taungoo in the southeastern corner, east of the Bago Yoma mountain range remained as the last holdout of the independent kingdom.

The Confederation's failure to snuff out Taungoo proved costly. Surrounded by hostile kingdoms, Taungoo took the initiative to consolidate its position, and defeated a much stronger Hanthawaddy in 1534–1541. When Taungoo turned against Prome, the Shans belatedly sent in their armies. Taungoo took Prome in 1542 and Bagan, just below Ava, in 1544. In January 1555, King Bayinnaung of the Taungoo dynasty conquered Ava, ending the city's role as the capital of Upper Burma for nearly two centuries.

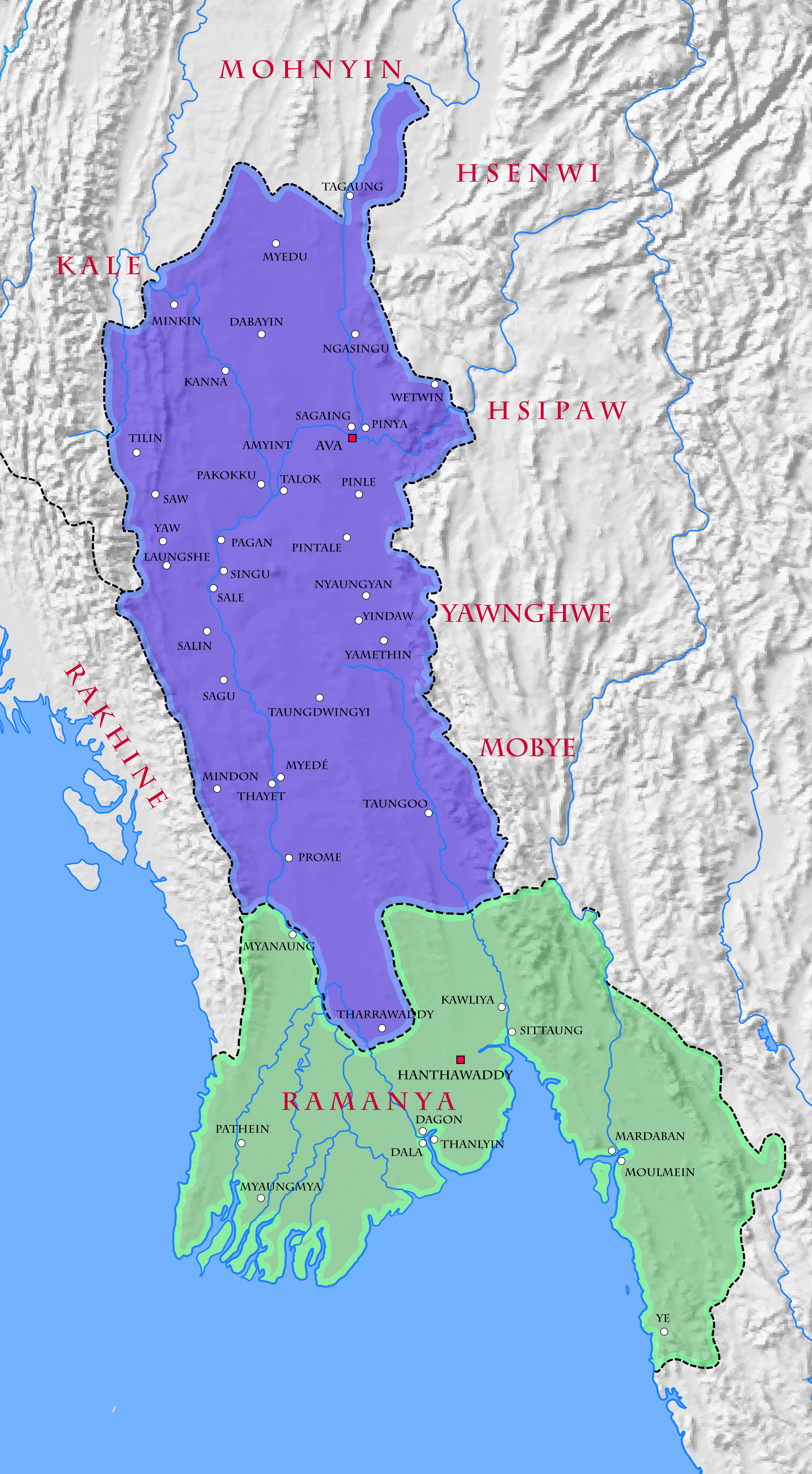
Kingdom of Ava in 1368

== Capital ==
Thado Minbya founded the city of Ava (modern day Inwa) and consecrated it as Ratanapura, the City of Gems, which was to remain the capital of Myanmar more or less continuously until the mid 19th century. The city was designed according to the traditional principles of Burmese city design, which had existed since at least the Pyu period. Ava was the first Burmese city to be entirely walled, with an inner citadel and an outer civilian city. Ava's citadel is probably the only barrel shaped city in the world. According to legend the outline of the city walls was intended to replicate the appearance of a mythical Burmese Lion, a Chinthe. What is certain is that Ava, or at least its inner citadel, is designed to replicate the Buddhist universe in miniature. The palace was constructed in the very centre of the citadel, which according to traditional principles of Burmese city design, corresponds to the location of the Buddha, therefore directly associating the King with the Buddha himself. This conferred upon the King a divine status and the palace as a religious centrepiece. The palace was specifically designed to emulate the highly auspicious Mount Meru in Hindu-Buddhist belief. The kingdom and its power emanated directly from the city as a mandala, encircling the entirety of the world (in theory) and therefore the city was a cosmological centre of a divinely ordained kingdom.

During the reign of Swa Saw Ke, a council was convened at Ava which was attended by the King, members of the Sangha, Sinhalese monks, and Brahmins. In one inscription the city was said to be as pleasant as Tavatimsa, the most important of the Buddhist heavens which also served as the model for the earthly realm of Burmese kingdoms. Swa Saw Ke was known as an intellectual king who encouraged scholarly endeavours and the city was said to be full of intelligent conversation.

== Legacy ==
Ava's most notable legacy was its contribution to Burmese vernacular literature which flourished during this period. Literature moved from being written predominantly in Pali to using the vernacular Burmese language. Ava was a highly literate society with poetry being composed by people from all levels of society, such as a village headman of Palaung in 1355, who inscribed verse onto stone. Inscriptions in classical Burmese during both the Bagan and Ava periods written by commoners and nobles appear at a ratio of 3:1 in favour of the commoners.

Elaborate use of simile, metaphor, and other literary devices abound in Burmese verse, especially in the works of Shin Maharattathara. One of these works rejects the comforts of marriage and secular life for that of a forest ascetic. The following is a translation by Dr. Hla Pe, John Okell, and Anna Allott:

The maiden I marry shall be a forest dwelling, one that befits a hermit, far from the approach of men; she will tend to all my needs and will always keep me fed, with forest fruits for rice, and forest fruits for curry. I shall have Wisdom for my washing-water, for it cleanses the dirt of greed, hatred, and ignorance; and when I have neatly tied the ascetic's knot in my hair, I shall bedeck it with Faith for a garland; the fragrance of Meditation shall be my sandalwood, and I shall anoint myself with the sweet-smelling and cooling juice of aloes. ... I shall wear the priceless and costly garment of the Law.

== See also ==
- Ava kings family tree
- Kingdom of Mrauk U
- List of monarchs

== Bibliography ==
- Aung-Thwin, Michael (2010). "The Myth of the 'Three Shan Brothers' and the Ava Period in Burmese History". The Journal of Asian Studies. 55 (4). Cambridge University Press: 881–901. doi:10.2307/2646527. JSTOR 2646527. S2CID 162150555.
- Coedès, George (1968). The Indianized States of Southeast Asia (1967 ed.). University of Hawaii Press.
- Harvey, G. E. (1925). History of Burma: From the Earliest Times to 10 March 1824. London: Frank Cass & Co. Ltd.
- Htin Aung, Maung (1967). A History of Burma. New York and London: Cambridge University Press.
- Phayre, Lt. Gen. Sir Arthur P. (1967) [1883]. History of Burma. London: Susil Gupta.
