= Khame Mi =

Khame Mi ခမည်းမိ

Chief queen consort of Ava
- Tenure: 1367 – c. 1390s
- Predecessor: Saw Omma of Pinya
- Successor: Shin Saw Gyi of Sagaing
- Born: c. 1330s
- Died: c. 1390s Ava (Inwa)
- Spouse: Swa Saw Ke
- Issue: Min Padamya; Saw Sala Dewi; Minkhaung Medaw; Yan Aung Min Ye
- Religion: Theravada Buddhism

Khame Mi (Burmese: ခမည်းမိ, pronounced [kʰəmɛ́ mḭ]) was the first chief queen consort of King Swa Saw Ke of Ava in upper Burma in what is now the country of Myanmar. She is regarded as the mother of King Tarabya, the successor of Swa, by the standard Burmese chronicles despite inscriptional evidence to the contrary.

== Brief ==
The chronicles provide little detail about her background. Given that her brother Thilawa was married to Saw Pale, a granddaughter of King Kyawswa of Pagan, and that she herself was married to Swa Saw Ke, brother of Saw Pale, she was certainly of royal descent. She had at least one other brother, Maha Pyauk. Furthermore, she most probably married Swa sometime between 1343 and 1351 during his stint as governor of Yamethin in the Pinya Kingdom before his defection to Sagaing c. 1351. (Note: Swa returned from Arakan c. 1343 and defected to Sagaing after the death of King Kyawswa I of Pinya in December 1350.)

In 1367, King Thado Minbya of Ava died, leaving no heirs. The court first offered the throne to Thilawa, but her brother declined, instead recommending Swa for the job. Swa accepted the offer, and Khame Mi became the chief queen with the title of Queen of the Southern Palace. According to the standard chronicles Maha Yazawin and Hmannan Yazawin, she finally bore Swa a child, who later became King Tarabya. However, the Yazawin Thit chronicle, citing a contemporary inscription, says Shin Saw Gyi was the mother of Tarabya but the compilers of Hmannan rejected it nonetheless. (Since Tarabya was born in December 1368, she would have been in her 30s, probably mid-to-late 30s.)

At any rate, the chief queen died sometime between 1387 and 1398, and was succeeded by Shin Saw Gyi as the chief queen. (Note: Per inscriptional evidence, Khame Mi was still alive on 18 December 1387 (Wed, 10th waxing of Pyatho 749 ME) per (Taw, Forchhammer 1899: 152), and Shin Saw Gyi was mentioned as the chief queen on 13 June 1398 (Wed, 12th waxing of Waso 760 ME) per (Taw, Forchhammer 1899: 164))

== Bibliography ==
- Royal Historical Commission of Burma (2003) [1832]. Hmannan Yazawin (in Burmese). Vol. 1–3. Yangon: Ministry of Information, Myanmar.
- Taw, Sein Ko; Emanuel Forchhammer (1899). Inscriptions of Pagan, Pinya and Ava: Translation, with Notes. Archaeological Survey of India.

Khame Mi Ava Kingdom Born: c. 1330s Died: c. 1390s
Royal titles
| Preceded by Saw Omma of Pinya | Chief queen consort of Ava; 1367–c. 1390s | Succeeded by Shin Saw Gyi of Sagaing |
