= Min Hla Htut of Ava =

Min Hla Htut မင်းလှထွတ်

Duchess of Prome
- Reign: c. March 1417 – c. March 1422
- Successor: Shin Yun
- Born: 1388/89; 750 ME; Ava (Inwa); Ava Kingdom
- Died: ?
- Spouse: Saw Shwe Khet (m. 1403/04–?)
- Issue: Shin Yun
- House: Pinya
- Father: Tarabya of Ava
- Mother: Min Hla Myat of Ava
- Religion: Theravada Buddhism

Min Hla Htut (Burmese: မင်းလှထွတ်, pronounced [mɪ́ɴ l̥a̰ tʰʊʔ]; also known as Saw Min Phyu (စောမင်းဖြူ); b. 1388/89) was a princess of Ava. She was the only daughter of King Tarabya of Ava and Queen Min Hla Myat of Ava and sister of King Min Nyo of Ava.

According to the Maha Yazawin chronicle, her first marriage was to Prince Thihathu, her first cousin six years her junior. The marriage, arranged by her uncle King Minkhaung I, soon ended in divorce. The king then married her off to Saw Shwe Khet. However, the chronicle Yazawin Thit rejects that the marriage between Saw Min Htut and Thihathu ever took place, citing a 1415/16 stone inscription. (Note: The Yazawin Thit cites a 777 ME (1415/16 CE) inscription which states that Min Htut and Shwe Khet were married in 765 ME (1403/04) when Thihathu (b. 1394) was at most nine years old. This means Thihathu would have been even younger if Hla Htut and Thihathu were married prior to 1403/04.) The Hmannan Yazawin accepts the Yazawin Thit's rejection.

According to the inscription, Hla Htut married Saw Shwe Khet in 1403/04. They had their child, Shin Yun, c. 1408. (Note: Shin Yun was in her seventh year (aged six) at the time of the inscription (in 1415/16).) Shin Yun later became wife of Gov. Min Maha of Prome.

== Ancestry ==
Hla Htut was a granddaughter of King Swa Saw Ke of Ava, and ultimately descended from the Pagan royalty.

Ancestry of Princess Hla Htut

8. (=14) Min Shin Saw of Thayet
4. Swa Saw Ke
9. (=15) Shin Myat Hla of Prome
2. Tarabya of Ava
10. Thado Hsinhtein of Tagaung
5. Shin Saw Gyi of Sagaing
11. Soe Min of Sagaing
1. Hla Htut
12. unnamed
6. Thilawa of Yamethin
13. unnamed
3. Min Hla Myat of Ava
14. (=8) Min Shin Saw of Thayet
7. Saw Pale of Yamethin
15. (=9) Shin Myat Hla of Prome

== Bibliography ==
- Kala, U (2006) [1724]. Maha Yazawin (in Burmese). Vol. 1–3 (4th printing ed.). Yangon: Ya-Pyei Publishing.
- Maha Sithu (2012) [1798]. Kyaw Win; Thein Hlaing (eds.). Yazawin Thit (in Burmese). Vol. 1–3 (2nd ed.). Yangon: Ya-Pyei Publishing.
- Royal Historical Commission of Burma (2003) [1832]. Hmannan Yazawin (in Burmese). Vol. 1–3. Yangon: Ministry of Information, Myanmar.

Min Hla Htut of Ava Ava Kingdom Born: 1388/89
Royal titles
Preceded by	Duchess of Prome c. March 1417 – March 1422	Succeeded by Shin Yun
