= Sithu Pauk Hla of Yamethin =

Burmese army officer (c. before 1368 – c. 1413)

Sithu of Yamethin
- ရမည်းသင်း စည်သူ

Governor of Yamethin
- In office c. November 1400 – c. mid 1413
- Monarch: Minkhaung I
- Preceded by: Maha Pyauk
- Succeeded by: Sithu Thihapate

Personal details
- Born: Pauk Hla c. before 1368 Wun Zin, Ava Kingdom
- Died: c. 1413
- Parents: Min Yaza of Wun Zin (father); Me Chit (mother)

Military service
- Allegiance: Kingdom of Ava
- Branch/service: Royal Ava Armed Forces
- Years of service: 1400–c. 1413
- Rank: General
- Battles/wars: Ava–Hanthawaddy War (1408–1418); Ava–Hsenwi War (1412)

Sithu of Yamethin (Burmese: ရမည်းသင်း စည်သူ, pronounced [jəmɛ́ðɪ́ɰ̃ sìðù]; c. before 1368 – c. 1413), also known by his birth name Pauk Hla ([paʊʔ l̥a̰]), was governor of Yamethin from 1400 to c. 1413. He was the eldest child of Chief Minister Min Yaza, and also served as a senior commander in the Royal Ava armed forces. He fought in all the major campaigns of the Forty Years' War between 1408 and 1412.

== Early life ==
Probably born before 1368, (Note: Per Khin Maung Nyunt, Pauk Hla's father Nga Nyo (b. 1347/48) married Me Chit when Nyo was in his late teens, meaning (c. 1365 or 1366). Nyunt continues that Nyo, Chit and their "household" moved to Ava in 1368, meaning at least the eldest child may have been born by then.) Pauk Hla was the eldest child of an athi (Note: The athi (အသည်) did not live on royal land and paid substantial taxes but owed no regular military service.) commoner family of Nga Nyo and Me Chit from Wun Zin, a rural village in the Kingdom of Ava. He had at least two siblings: one full younger sister Saw Myat Lay, and a half younger brother, Saw Yin; he may have also had another younger brother. (Note: The main chronicles mention only Saw Myat Lay as Pauk Hla's full sibling; and Gov. Saw Yin of Badon as his half-sibling. The Mani Yadanabon says Min Yaza had another son, governor of Yenantha without specifying the mother.)

He grew up in the royal capital of Ava (Inwa) from 1368 onwards. His father had entered the service of King Swa Saw Ke, and the entire family had moved to Ava since 1368. His father went on to become the chief minister of the court with the title of Min Yaza.

== Career ==
Pauk Hla's career rose alongside his father's. His career defining appointment came in 1400 when the new king of Ava, Minkhaung I, appointed him governor of Yamethin, a major irrigated district traditionally held by the most senior royals, (Note: Yamethin was one of the "Five Irrigated Districts" of Ava: (1) Yamethin, (2) Petpaing, (3) Pyakaung, (4) Taung Nyo and (5) Tamyinhsan—all part of the modern Yamethin District. Previous governors of Yamethin include Swa Saw Ke later king of Ava; Thilawa of Yamethin and Maha Pyauk of Yamethin.) and gave him the command of a 50-strong royal war elephant company. The appointments came alongside Minkhaung's other appointments which included Yaza's son-in-law Thado Theinkhathu being made governor of Badon and Tabayin. The appointments were designed to retain Min Yaza's support by the new king, who had come to power only after a contentious succession crisis. Indeed, the Yamethin governorship previously belonged to Maha Pyauk of Yamethin, who had tried to seize the Ava throne from Minkhaung.

Pauk Hla, now known by the title of Sithu, loyally served as governor for the next dozen plus years. As governor of a major fief, Sithu served in the Royal Ava Armed Forces, and fought in various campaigns—from Hanthawaddy in the south (1408–1410), to Arakan in the west (1411–1412) to Hsenwi in the northeast (1412). He led entire armies in the 1408, and 1409–1410 campaigns, and later served as one of the deputy commanders in Crown Prince Minye Kyawswa's armies from 1410 onwards.

He is not mentioned in the royal chronicles again after 1412. The Yazawin Thit chronicle cursorily mentions that King Minkhaung appointed Sithu Thihapate governor of Yamethin in late 1413 but does not say what had ever happened to the previous governor. (Note: The Yazawin Thit says King Minkhaung appointed Thihapate governor of Yamethin after the rainy season of 775 ME had ended (c. October/November 1413), citing a stone inscription about King Tabinshwehti's genealogy that lists Thihapate as governor of Yamethin.) While it is not clear if Sithu Pauk Hla had fallen in action or had died by natural causes, he did not lose the governorship because his father had lost power. Min Yaza remained the chief minister of the Ava court until his death in 1421.

== Military service ==
The following is a list of military campaigns in which Sithu of Yamethin is explicitly mentioned in the royal chronicles as a commander.

Campaign	Duration	Troops commanded (Note: Chronicle reported troop levels reduced by an order of magnitude per (Harvey 1925: 333–336))	Notes
Ava invasion of Hanthawaddy	May 1408	1 regiment (1000 troops)	Commanded a regiment in the 20,000+ strong vanguard invasion army
Ava withdrawal from Hanthawaddy	August 1408	Rearguard Army (8000 troops)	Commanded the rearguard army (8 regiments, 8000 troops, 800 cavalry, 20 elephants)
Ava invasion of Hanthawaddy	1409–1410	Vanguard Army (10,000 troops)	Commanded the vanguard army that invaded Hanthawaddy
Ava invasion of Hanthawaddy	late 1410	Navy (7000 troops)	One of the commanders of the naval invasion force (7000 troops, 7 war ships, 70 war boats, 20 armored war boats, 20 transport boats, 30 supply boats)
Siege of Sandoway	late 1411–March 1412	1 regiment	Commanded a regiment in the 8000-strong army led by Crown Prince Minye Kyawswa that invaded Sandoway
Battle of Wetwin	c. April 1412	1 regiment	Commanded a regiment in Minye Kyawswa's army from Sandoway that went to meet invading Hsenwi forces at Wetwin.
Siege of Hsenwi	May–November 1412	1 regiment	Part of Minye Kyawswa's army that laid siege to Hsenwi

== Bibliography ==
- Aung-Thwin, Michael A. (2017). Myanmar in the Fifteenth Century. Honolulu: University of Hawai'i Press. ISBN 978-0-8248-6783-6.
- Myanma Swezon Kyan (in Burmese). Vol. 8 (2 ed.). Yangon: Sarpay Beikman. 1979. pp. 362–363.
- Kala, U (2006) [1724]. Maha Yazawin (in Burmese). Vol. 1–3 (4th printing ed.). Yangon: Ya-Pyei Publishing.
- Khin Maung Nyunt (6 July 2016). "Minkyi Swa Saw Ke, Wunzin Pho Yaza and Meikhtila Lake" (PDF). The Global New Light of Myanmar. Yangon. pp. 8–9.
- Lieberman, Victor B. (2003). Strange Parallels: Southeast Asia in Global Context, c. 800–1830, volume 1, Integration on the Mainland. Cambridge University Press. ISBN 978-0-521-80496-7.
- Maha Sithu (2012) [1798]. Kyaw Win; Thein Hlaing (eds.). Yazawin Thit (in Burmese). Vol. 1–3 (2nd ed.). Yangon: Ya-Pyei Publishing.
- Royal Historical Commission of Burma (2003) [1832]. Hmannan Yazawin (in Burmese). Vol. 1–3. Yangon: Ministry of Information, Myanmar.
- Sandalinka, Shin (2009) [1781]. Mani Yadanabon (in Burmese) (4th printing ed.). Yangon: Seit-Ku Cho Cho.
- Thein Hlaing, U (2011) [2000]. Research Dictionary of Burmese History (in Burmese) (3rd ed.). Yangon: Khit-Pya Taik.
- Wilkie, R.S., ed. (1934). Burma Gazetteer: Yamethin District. Vol. A. Rangoon: Superintendent, Government Printing and Stationery, Burma.

Sithu Pauk Hla of Yamethin Ava Kingdom Born: c. 1360s Died: c. 1413?
Preceded by Maha Pyauk	Governor of Yamethin; 1400 – c. 1413	Succeeded by Sithu Thihapate
