= Maha Pyauk of Yamethin =

Maha Pyauk of Yamethin; ရမည်းသင်း မဟာပြောက်

Governor of Yamethin
- Reign: 1395/96 – October/November 1400
- Predecessor: Thilawa
- Successor: Sithu Pauk Hla
- King: Swa Saw Ke (1395/96–1400); Tarabya (1400)
- Born: c. 1330s
- Died: October/November 1400; before 9th waxing of Nadaw 762 ME; near Pinya
- Religion: Theravada Buddhism

Maha Pyauk (Burmese: မဟာပြောက်, pronounced [məhà bjaʊ̯ʔ]; d. October/November 1400; also spelled Mahabyauk) was governor of Yamethin and a key army commander from 1395/96 to 1400. He emerged as one of the pretenders to the Ava throne after King Tarabya's assassination. But Pyauk himself was assassinated by Prince Theiddat, who wanted his elder brother Minkhaung to succeed.

== Brief ==
Pyauk was a younger brother of Governor-General Thilawa of Yamethin. After Thilawa's death in 1395/96, King Swa Saw Ke of Ava appointed Pyauk to be the next governor of Yamethin as well as the commander of the army Thilawa previously commanded. According to the royal chronicles, Pyauk took command of an army consisted of 60 elephants, 800 cavalry and 10,000 men.

Pyauk became a pretender to the throne in October/November 1400 when King Tarabya was assassinated just seven months in office. The court led by Min Yaza executed the assassin Gov. Thihapate of Tagaung, and selected Minkhaung, another son of Swa. But Minkhaung, who did not command an army, was concerned about Pyauk, and told the court to offer the throne to Pyauk instead. But Minkhaung's younger brother Theiddat disagreed with his brother's decision. As Pyauk marched with his large army to Ava to take over the throne, Theiddat and his small army ambushed Pyauk near Pinya, and successfully assassinated Pyauk.

After Pyauk's death, Minkhaung ascended the throne on 25 November 1400 (or 26 October 1400). (Note: Minkhaung's accession date (9th waxing of Nadaw 762 ME) is conventionally translated as 25 November 1400. The translation assumes that 762 ME was a great leap year. If 762 ME were a regular year, the 9th waxing of Nadaw 762 ME would translate to Tuesday, 26 October 1400.) The new king appointed Min Yaza's son Pauk Hla governor of Yamethin.

== Bibliography ==
- Aung-Thwin, Michael A. (2017). Myanmar in the Fifteenth Century. Honolulu: University of Hawai'i Press. ISBN 978-0-8248-6783-6.
- Kala, U (2006) [1724]. Maha Yazawin (in Burmese). Vol. 1–3 (4th printing ed.). Yangon: Ya-Pyei Publishing.
- Maha Sithu (2012) [1798]. Kyaw Win; Thein Hlaing (eds.). Yazawin Thit (in Burmese). Vol. 1–3 (2nd ed.). Yangon: Ya-Pyei Publishing.
- Royal Historical Commission of Burma (2003) [1832]. Hmannan Yazawin (in Burmese). Vol. 1–3. Yangon: Ministry of Information, Myanmar.
- Than Tun (December 1959). "History of Burma: A.D. 1300–1400". Journal of Burma Research Society. XLII (II).
- Wilkie, R.S., ed. (1934). Burma Gazetter: Yamethin District. Vol. A. Rangoon.

Maha Pyauk of Yamethin Ava Kingdom Born: c. 1330s Died: October/November 1400
Royal titles
Preceded by Thilawa	Governor of Yamethin; 1395/96–1400	Succeeded by Sithu Pauk Hla
