= Saw Beza =

Saw Beza စောဘေဇာ

Queen Consort of Ava
- Tenure: October 1373 – April 1400

Queen Mother of Ava
- Tenure: c. 25 November 1400–c. October 1421

Queen Grandmother of Ava
- Tenure: c. 1421–c. 1423
- Born: c. 1350s Gazun-Neint
- Died: Unknown; Ava (Inwa)
- Spouse: Swa Saw Ke
- Issue: Minkhaung I Theiddat; Thupaba Dewi
- Religion: Theravada Buddhism

Saw Beza (Burmese: စောဘေဇာ, pronounced [sɔ́ bèzà]) was a queen consort of King Swa Saw Ke of Ava. She was the mother of King Minkhaung I of Ava, Gov. Theiddat of Sagaing, and Queen Thupaba Dewi of Hanthawaddy Pegu.

== Brief ==
The future queen was a commoner named Mi Beza from a small village named Gazun-Neint (ကန်စွန်းနိမ့်) near Mohnyin (in present-day Kachin State). King Swa met her at her village in the dry season of 1372–73 while he was on campaign to Mohnyin. The king took her as a concubine during the campaign. After the campaign, he told her to come to Ava (Inwa) if she gave birth to his son. She gave birth to a son (later King Minkhaung I) on 13 October 1373, after which she went to Ava. The king, as promised, raised her to queen. They had two more children.

== Bibliography ==
- Royal Historical Commission of Burma (1832). Hmannan Yazawin (in Burmese). Vol. 1–3 (2003 ed.). Yangon: Ministry of Information, Myanmar.

Saw Beza Ava Kingdom Born: c. 1350s Died: ?
Royal titles
Preceded by Saw Taw Oo of Sagaing	Queen Consort of Ava; 1373–1400	Succeeded by Min Hla Myat of Ava
Preceded by	Queen Mother of Ava; 1400–1421	Succeeded by
Preceded by	Queen Grandmother of Ava; 1421–1423	Succeeded by
