= Thilawa of Yamethin =

Thilawa of Yamethin; ရမည်းသင်း သီလဝ

Governor of Yamethin
- Reign: c. 1351 – 1395/96
- Predecessor: Swa Saw Ke
- Successor: Maha Pyauk
- King: Kyawswa II (1351–1359); Narathu (1359–1364); Uzana II (1364); Thado Minbya (1364–1367); Swa Saw Ke (1367–1395)
- Born: c. 1330
- Died: 1395/96; 757 ME; Yamethin
- Spouse: Saw Pale
- Issue: Min Hla Myat; unnamed daughter
- House: Pinya
- Religion: Theravada Buddhism

Thilawa (Burmese: သီလဝ, pronounced [θìləwa̰]; d. 1395/96) was governor of Yamethin in the late Pinya period and early Ava period of Myanmar. He is best remembered in Burmese history as someone who smiled only three times in his life. The taciturn governor refused the court's offer to become king in 1367, and instead became one of the four top commanders of the eventual king, Swa Saw Ke. He served in the war against the southern Hanthawaddy Kingdom between 1386 and 1391, and decisively defeated the 1392–93 invasion by the northern state of Mohnyin.

== Governor of Yamethin ==
The royal chronicles provide no detail about his background. But given that he was a governor of a key region; he was married to Saw Pale, a granddaughter of King Kyawswa of Pagan; his younger sister Khame Mi was the chief queen of King Swa Saw Ke; and he was offered the throne in 1367, he was most probably of the Pagan–Myinsaing–Pinya royal line. (Note: Chronicles (Yazawin Thit Vol. 1 2012: 184, 185) (Hmannan Vol. 1 2003: 403, 404) repeatedly refer to him as min ("lord"), reserved only for those of royal background (min-myo). Indeed, none of the chronicles states that Thilawa was a commoner. If he were a commoner, chronicles would certainly mention the fact. (Hmannan Vol. 1 2003: 402) states that the court offered Thilawa the throne because they disapproved of the pretender Nga Nu, a non-royal. Chronicles tend to explicitly state when someone of non-royal descent was in contention for the throne. Another example in the same period is the chronicle reported genealogy of King Minbyauk Thihapate of Sagaing who per (Yazawin Thit Vol. 1 2012: 176) (Hmannan Vol. 1 2003: 393) was not of royal descent. Given that Thilawa was governor of Yamethin, a key city in the Pinya Kingdom during the 1350s, he was most likely of Pagan–Myinsaing–Pinya line like his brother-in-law Swa.)

Thilawa succeeded Swa as governor of Yamethin after Swa defected to Sagaing, Pinya's cross-river rival c. 1351. At Yamethin, he remained loyal to his overlords at Pinya until 1364 when he submitted to Thado Minbya of Sagaing, the founder of Ava Kingdom. According to the chronicles, Thilawa was stoic and taciturn in character, and utterly disinterested in the niceties of statecraft. Nonetheless, he was noticed for his leadership abilities. When Thado Minbya died without an heir in 1367, the court offered the Ava throne to Thilawa. But he refused, saying that he spoke no more than three or four words a day, and would not make an effective king. Instead, he suggested that the court offer the office to his brother-in-law Swa.

In the following years, he served in Swa's campaigns, becoming one of the king's top four generals. He died in 1395/96, (Note: (Hmannan Vol. 1 2003: 434): 737 ME = 30 March 1395 to 29 March 1396) and was succeeded by Maha Pyauk as governor.

== Military service ==
The chronicles' record of his military service starts only from Swa's reign, although he was first offered the throne of a still fractious and fragmented kingdom. It is not clear if or in what capacity he had participated in earlier military campaigns. (Note: Chronicles (Hmannan Vol. 1 2003: 434) say he defended Yamethin against Shan invaders but do not specify when. It may have predated Sawsawke's reign since chronicles do not state any Shan penetration to Yamethin during Sawsawke's reign; the farthest Shans got to was Sagaing in 1393 per (Hmannan Vol. 1 2003: 433) and (Harvey 1925: 85).) The taciturn governor was the first of the four top generals of King Swa. The other three were Theinkhathu Saw Hnaung of Saku, Tuyin of Inyi, and Min Pale of Paukmyaing.

Thilawa's best known campaign was also his last. In 1392, Mohnyin, a powerful Shan state, seized Ava's territory of Myedu, which was then Ava's northernmost vassal. Swa responded with a combined land and naval attack. But the army led by Saw Hnaung and Tuyin was badly defeated, and chased back to Sagaing. The Mohnyin forces laid siege to Sagaing, across the river from Ava. Swa frantically requested his southern vassals for help. Thilawa's army (consisting of seven regiments) rushed to Sagaing, and broke the siege. He took over the overall command, and the reinforced Ava army drove back the invaders. At Shangon, about 30 km northwest of Sagaing, the Ava army decisively defeated the Mohnyin army, destroying all 15 regiments of the enemy. It was such a crushing defeat that the raids from Mohnyin ended for the rest of Swa's reign.

After the victory, Thilawa returned straight to Yamethin. He apparently did not wish to bask in glory, and did not stop by Ava, which was on the way to Yamethin. Swa was miffed by what he deemed the disrespectful behavior by his brother-in-law. But Chief Minister Wun Zin Min Yaza reminded the king that Thilawa was never known for etiquette, and that the aloof governor did not mean any harm. The king agreed with the assessment, and sent lavish gifts to Thilawa.

The following is a list of campaigns by Thilawa as reported in the chronicles:

Campaign	Duration	Troops commanded	Notes
Ava–Hanthawaddy War (1385–1391)	1385–86	1 regiment	Commanded a regiment in the First Army (7000 men in 9 regiments) that invaded Hanthawaddy via Toungoo
Ava–Hanthawaddy War (1385–1391)	1386–87	1 regiment	Commanded a regiment in the First Army (12,000 men in 11 regiments)
Ava–Hanthawaddy War (1385–1391)	1390–91	1 regiment	Commanded a regiment in the First Army (12,000 men in 12 regiments)
Mohnyin–Ava War	1392–93	7 regiments (Battle of Sagaing); Overall army (after Sagaing)	Commander of the Southern Army; Commander-in-chief of the overall army; led the counterattack

== Three smiles ==
Thilawa reportedly smiled or laughed only three times in his life:

1. One day, when he got back home, his wife Saw Pale ran up to him and washed his feet with water. Since she had never done such a thing, he smiled, knowing something was up.
2. Once, he laughed when he saw that a piece of cloth in the town's moat turned out to be the headdress of a nearly naked man who was taking a bath underwater but had forgotten to take off his headdress.
3. His wife interrupted a cockfight he was watching to tell him that the Shans were rushing the town (Yamethin); she was so disheveled that he smiled. (He finished the cockfight before driving off the Shans.)

== Family ==
Thilawa and his wife Saw Pale had two daughters:

- Min Hla Myat, Chief queen of King Tarabya (r. 1400), and mother of King Kale Kye-Taung Nyo (r. 1425–26)
- Unnamed daughter, who was married to the rebel prince Minye Kyawhtin of Toungoo

== Bibliography ==
- Burma Translation Society (1973). "Gov. Thilawa of Yamethin". Myanma Swezon Kyan (in Burmese). Vol. 13 (1 ed.). Yangon: Sarpay Beikman.
- Harvey, G. E. (1925). History of Burma: From the Earliest Times to 10 March 1824. London: Frank Cass & Co. Ltd.
- Htin Aung, Maung (1967). A History of Burma. New York and London: Cambridge University Press.
- Kala, U (2006) [1724]. Maha Yazawin (in Burmese). Vol. 1–3 (4th printing ed.). Yangon: Ya-Pyei Publishing.
- Maha Sithu (2012) [1798]. Kyaw Win; Thein Hlaing (eds.). Yazawin Thit (in Burmese). Vol. 1–3 (2nd ed.). Yangon: Ya-Pyei Publishing.
- Royal Historical Commission of Burma (2003) [1832]. Hmannan Yazawin (in Burmese). Vol. 1–3. Yangon: Ministry of Information, Myanmar.

Thilawa of Yamethin Ava Kingdom Born: c. 1330 Died: 1395/96
Royal titles
Preceded by Swa Saw Ke	Governor of Yamethin c. 1351–1395/96	Succeeded by Maha Pyauk
