= Yazathingyan (disambiguation) =

Yazathingyan or Yaza Thingyan (c. 1263 – 1312/13) was a co-founder of Myinsaing Kingdom in present-day central Myanmar.

Yazathingyan may also refer to:

- Yazathingyan of Pagan: Chief Minister of Pagan (1240s–1260) and commander-in-chief of the royal army (1258–1260)
- Yazathingyan (14th-century minister): Minister of the Ava court (c. 1365–1400) and Governor of Sagaing (by 1383–1400)
- Yazathingyan (15th-century minister): Chief Minister of Ava (1426–1468)
