= Thupaba Dewi =

Thupaba Dewi သုပဘာ ဒေဝီ

Queen consort of Pegu
- Tenure: 1403 – 1421
- Born: in or after 1376; Ava (Inwa)
- Died: ? Pegu (Bago)?
- Spouse: Razadarit
- Father: Swa Saw Ke
- Mother: Saw Beza
- Religion: Theravada Buddhism

Thupaba Dewi (Burmese: သုပဘာ ဒေဝီ, pronounced [θṵpa̰bà dèwì]; Pali: Supabhādevī) was an Ava princess who became a queen consort of King Razadarit of Hanthawaddy.

== Brief ==
She was born Min Hla Myat to Saw Beza and King Swa Saw Ke of Ava. She was the youngest of three children and had two elder brothers Min Swe and Theiddat. She was born in or after 1376. (Note: The eldest child Minkhaung was born on 13 September 1373 per (Maha Yazawin Vol. 2 2006: 55; footnote 1). The second son Theiddat was two years younger per (Hmannan Vol. 1 2003: 439), meaning he was born 1375/76. Therefore Hla Myat could have been born 1376 at the earliest.) She was also known by the title of Thupaba Dewi (Pali: Supabha Devi).

In 1403, (Note: Standard chronicles ((Maha Yazawin Vol. 1 2006: 329) and (Hmannan Vol. 1 2003: 469)) say that she was given in marriage to Razadarit in late 768 ME (early 1407) at the end of Razadarit's invasion of Ava. But according to a contemporary inscription, per (Yazawin Thit Vol. 1 2012: 220–221), the invasion took place in 1401/02. Attempts to reach a truce began about 10 days after Ava forces defeated Pegu forces at the battle of Nawin near Prome on Tuesday, 3rd waxing of Tabodwe 764 ME (26 December 1402). It means the first attempt to negotiate began around 5 January 1403.) her eldest brother, now King Minkhaung I, gave her to King Razadarit of Hanthawaddy in a marriage of state.

== Bibliography ==
- Kala, U (2006) [1724]. Maha Yazawin (in Burmese). Vol. 1–3 (4th printing ed.). Yangon: Ya-Pyei Publishing.
- Maha Sithu (2012) [1798]. Kyaw Win; Thein Hlaing (eds.). Yazawin Thit (in Burmese). Vol. 1–3 (2nd ed.). Yangon: Ya-Pyei Publishing.
- Pan Hla, Nai (2005) [1968]. Razadarit Ayedawbon (in Burmese) (8th printing ed.). Yangon: Armanthit Sarpay.
- Royal Historical Commission of Burma (2003) [1832]. Hmannan Yazawin (in Burmese). Vol. 1–3. Yangon: Ministry of Information, Myanmar.
