= Min Hla Htut =

Min Hla Htut was a Burmese royal title. It may mean:

- Min Hla Htut of Ava, Duchess of Prome (c. 1417 – c. 1422)
- Min Hla Htut of Pyakaung, Queen consort of Toungoo ( 1470 – 1481)
