= Shin Saw of Ava =

Shin Saw ရှင်စော

Chief queen consort of Ava
- Tenure: by 25 November 1400 – c. February 1422
- Predecessor: Min Hla Myat
- Successor: Saw Min Hla
- Born: c. early 1380s Ava (Inwa)
- Died: Unknown; Ava (Inwa)
- Spouse: Minkhaung I (1400–22)
- House: Ava
- Father: Kyawswa?
- Mother: Saw Myat Ke?
- Religion: Theravada Buddhism

Shin Saw (Burmese: ရှင်စော, [ʃɪ̀ɴ sɔ́]) was the chief queen consort of King Minkhaung I of Ava from 1400 to 1422. The royal chronicles identify her as Hsinbyushin ("Lord of the White Elephant").

== Brief ==
Her stone inscription dated 28 February 1409 states that she was the chief queen consort of Minkhaung I, and that she was a granddaughter of King Swa Saw Ke and his two senior queens (Queen of the Southern Palace and the Queen of the Northern Palace). The inscription continues that the two queen grandmothers were sisters of King Thado Minbya, which means they were Shin Saw Gyi of Sagaing and Saw Omma of Sagaing. It also means her parents, who were not explicitly named neither in the inscription nor in the chronicles, were first cousins. If the list of children of her two grandmothers given in the Hmannan Yazawin chronicle is accurate and complete, (Note: Per (Hmannan Vol. 1 2003: 436), Shin Saw Gyi had two children: Saw Myat Ke (daughter) and Saw Shwe Hnit (son). Saw Omma had a daughter named Saw Chantha who was married to someone named Uzana, and a son named Kyawswa.) her parents were most probably Kyawswa and Saw Myat Ke.

Saw became the chief queen of Minkhaung I, her half-uncle, at his accession in 1400. Her two younger sisters Saw Khway and Min Pyan were also married to the new king. She had no children.

== Bibliography ==
- Royal Historical Commission of Burma (2003) [1832]. Hmannan Yazawin (in Burmese). Vol. 1–3. Yangon: Ministry of Information, Myanmar.
- Than Tun (December 1959). "History of Burma: A.D. 1300–1400". Journal of Burma Research Society. XLII (II).

Shin Saw of Ava Ava Dynasty Born: c. 1380s
Royal titles
Preceded by Min Hla Myat	Chief queen consort of Ava; 1400–1422	Succeeded by Saw Min Hla
