= Min Hla Myat of Ava =

Min Hla Myat of Ava မင်းလှမြတ်

Chief queen consort of Ava
- Tenure: April 1400 – c. October 1400
- Predecessor: Shin Saw Gyi
- Successor: Shin Saw
- Born: c. 1370; Yamethin
- Died: Ava (Inwa)
- Spouse: Tarabya (1385–1400)
- Issue: Min Nyo; Min Hla Htut
- House: Pinya
- Father: Thilawa
- Mother: Saw Pale
- Religion: Theravada Buddhism

Min Hla Myat (Burmese: မင်းလှမြတ်, pronounced [mɪ́ɴ l̥a̰ mjaʔ]) was the chief queen consort of her first cousin King Tarabya of Ava. She married Tarabya in 1385. The queen was the mother of King Min Nyo (r. 1425–26) of Ava. Her only other child Min Hla Htut was the chief wife of Gov. Minye Kyawswa II of Prome (r. 1417–22; 1442–46).

== Ancestry ==
Her father was Gov. Thilawa of Yamethin, and through her mother Saw Pale she was a great granddaughter of King Kyawswa of Pagan.

Ancestry of Min Hla Myat

8.
4.
9.
2. Thilawa of Yamethin
10.
5.
11.
1. Hla Myat
12. Kyawswa of Pagan
6. Min Shin Saw of Thayet
13. Saw Soe of Pagan
3. Saw Pale of Yamethin
14. Thihathu of Prome
7. Shin Myat Hla of Prome
15. Atula Dewi of Prome

== Bibliography ==
- Royal Historical Commission of Burma (2003) [1832]. Hmannan Yazawin (in Burmese). Vol. 1–3. Yangon: Ministry of Information, Myanmar.

Min Hla Myat of Ava Ava Kingdom Born: c. 1370 Died: ?
Royal titles
Preceded by Shin Saw Gyi	Chief queen consort of Ava; April 1400 – c. October 1400	Succeeded by Shin Saw
