= Tuyin of Inyi =

Tuyin of Inyi အင်းယည် တုရင်
- Military career
- Allegiance: Ava Kingdom
- Branch: Royal Burmese Cavalry Corps
- Rank: General
- Conflicts: Mohnyin–Ava War (1392–1393)

Tuyin of Inyi (Burmese: အင်းယည် တုရင်, [ʔɪ́ɰ̃jɪ̀ tṵ jɪ̀ɰ̃]) was one of the top four generals in the service of King Swa Saw Ke of Ava. Although the royal chronicles list him as Number 3 of the top senior generals, they mention him in only one war, Mohnyin–Ava War (1392–93). The career cavalry corps officer apparently was a non-royal, and was conspicuously absent in the chronicles' commander lists for the Forty Years' War, which he must have participated in. He commanded the elephant corps in the first part of the Mohnyin war, and he was roundly defeated near Myedu. He later switched back to his natural cavalry corps, and under the overall command of Thilawa of Yamethin the Ava army decisively defeated the Mohnyin army outside Sagaing in 1393.

== Bibliography ==
- Burma Translation Society (1973). Myanma Swezon Kyan (in Burmese). Vol. 13 (1 ed.). Yangon: Sarpay Beikman.
- Royal Historical Commission of Burma (2003) [1832]. Hmannan Yazawin (in Burmese). Vol. 1–3. Yangon: Ministry of Information, Myanmar.
