= Yazathingyan (14th-century minister) =

Ava courtier and husband of Saw Omma

Yazathingyan ရာဇသင်္ကြန်

Senior Minister at the Ava Court
- In office c. 1365 – c. October 1400
- Monarchs: Thado Minbya; Swa Saw Ke; Tarabya

Governor of Sagaing
- In office by March 1383 – c. October 1400
- Monarchs: Swa Saw Ke; Tarabya
- Preceded by: Saw Me
- Succeeded by: Theiddat

Personal details
- Born: c. 1330s Sagaing Kingdom?
- Died: c. October 1400 Ava Kingdom
- Spouse: Saw Omma of Pinya

Military service
- Allegiance: Ava Kingdom
- Branch/service: Royal Burmese Army
- Years of service: by 1383–1400
- Rank: Commander
- Commands: Sagaing Regiment
- Battles/wars: Sagaing Expedition (1367); Ava–Hanthawaddy War (1385–1391)

Yazathingyan (Burmese: ရာဇသင်္ကြန်, pronounced [jàza̰ θɪ́ɴdʑàɴ]; also known as Nga Mauk, (ငမောက်; [ŋə maʊʔ]); d. c. October 1400) was a senior court minister under the first three kings of Ava, in what is now Myanmar, from c. 1365 to 1400. He also served as governor of Sagaing at least from 1383 to 1400.

He was the sixth and last husband of Queen Saw Omma, and thus a brother-in-law of King Swa Saw Ke of Ava (r. 1367–1400). He was given Queen Omma as a prize after he successfully put down the 1367 coup attempt by his brother, Commander Nga Nu, and the queen herself. Thirty three years later, it was Yazathingyan who attempted to seize the throne from King Tarabya (r. 1400). This attempt ended when he accidentally drowned en route to a confrontation with Tarabya.

== Early life and career ==
According to the royal chronicles, he was of commoner background and his personal name was Nga Mauk. He had at least one younger brother named Nga Nu. By 1367, both brothers were in the service of King Thado Minbya (r. 1364–1367). Mauk had risen to be a minister at the Ava court with the title of Yazathingyan while Nu had become the commander of the Inner Royal Household Guards.

== Succession crisis of 1367 ==
The brothers however were in the opposite camps in the succession crisis of 1367. After Thado Minbya's sudden death from smallpox, his chief queen Saw Omma persuaded Commander Nu, who had come to execute her on the king's last order, (Note: Right before his death, Thado Minbya ordered Nu to execute Queen Omma because he did not want her to be taken by another man.) to take the throne for himself. But the powerful court did not accept the usurping couple. When asked to choose between his brother and the court's nominee Swa Saw Ke, Yazathingyan sided with the court. He even agreed to lead an expedition to capture the couple, who had fled to Sagaing directly across the Irrawaddy River from Ava (Inwa). For his part, Swa had promised to grant the minister the districts of Taungbyon and Wayindok in fief, as well as give Queen Omma, who happened to be Swa's youngest sister, in marriage.

"You're not of royal line; neither are your parents."

— Yazathingyan's tirade after arresting his brother Nu

Yazathingyan went on to capture the city by guile. Instead of storming the heavily fortified city, which used to be the capital of the Sagaing Kingdom, he asked Nu to meet him outside the city to accept his defection. When Nu came out to meet his older brother with a few guards, Yazathingyan and his men promptly arrested him. He is said to have admonished his brother, "You're not of royal line; neither are your parents." The city fell with no resistance. Queen Omma too was captured. However, Nu soon escaped to Myadaung in the Shan states in the north, likely with Yazathingyan turning a blind eye. (Note: The chronicles Maha Yazawin and Hmannan Yazawin say Nu was placed in iron ankle shackles but he somehow escaped and fled north to Lahu (present-day Myadaung). The Yazawin Thit simply says Yazathingyan allowed Nu to escape to the Shan states.)

Though he suspected Yazathingyan of willful negligence in Nu's escape, Swa kept his promise. The king gave the minister the fiefs of Taungbyon and Wayindok as well as Saw Omma in marriage. However, when Nu began raiding Ava's northern regions in 1369–1370, Swa was furious, and seriously considered purging Yazathingyan. The minister was saved only when one of the youngest and newest advisers at the court, Nga Nyo, gently advised the king that keeping one's word even in times of great adversity would engender trust and confidence in the king's future interactions with others. Swa accepted the advice, and decided to keep Yazathingyan at the court as well as allowed him to retain the two fiefs and his marriage to Saw Omma.

== Later career ==
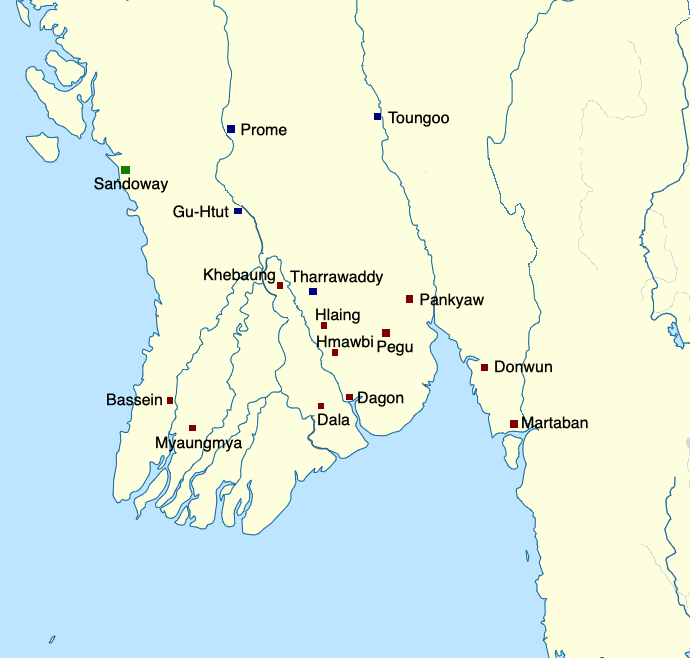
Yazathingyan went to the front with his Sagaing Regiment in all three campaigns of the Ava–Hanthawaddy War (1385–1391).

Yazathingyan apparently regained the king's trust in later years. Sometime between 1380 and 1383, (Note: The narratives by the Maha Yazawin and Hmannan Yazawin chronicles are ambiguous; they can be read as Yazathingyan being appointed governor of Sagaing in 1368 or in the early 1380s.: The chronicle Maha Yazawin (1724) mentions Yazathingyan's appointment at Sagaing in two places. Its first mention of Yazathingyan being governor of Sagaing is in the section about the governors of the kingdom that comes right after Swa's coronation ceremony on the new year's day of 730 ME (29 March 1368). Thus, it can be construed that Yazathingyan was also appointed on the same day or shortly after. However, the chronicle just a few pages later states that c. 731 ME (1369/70), Yazathingyan's fiefs were just Taungbyon and Wayindok, and that Yazathingyan was appointed governor of Sagaing only between 742 ME (1380/81) and before 745 ME (1383/84), succeeding Saw Me.; The Yazawin Thit chronicle (1798) tries to clarify the confusing narrative of the Maha Yazawin. It says King Swa gave his second ranked queen Saw Omma of Sagaing [not his sister Saw Omma of Pinya] Sagaing in fief in Tabaung 729 ME (February/March 1368). It continues that Swa appointed Yazathingyan to the Sagaing post only between 742 ME (1380/81) and before 745 ME (1383/84), succeeding Saw Me.; The Hmannan Yazawin (1832) simply follows the Maha Yazawin's ambiguous narrative.; Historian Michael Aung-Thwin places Yazathingyan's appointment in 1367/68 as part of Swa's coronation ceremony, citing the Maha Yazawin's initial narrative.) he was appointed governor of Sagaing by the king. As the lord of a major fief, he dutifully went to the front as the commander of the Sagaing Regiment throughout the Ava–Hanthawaddy War (1385–1391), twice under the command of Crown Prince Tarabya (1385–1386, and 1390–1391), and once under the command of King Swa (1386–1387).

== Attempted coup and death ==
His loyalty did not extend to Tarabya, who succeeded Swa in 1400. According to the chronicles, Yazathingyan was one of the pretenders who began jockeying for power soon after the new king went insane just five months into his reign. While chronicles do not explain why Yazathingyan, a commoner, would have even tried, (Note: To be sure, none of the main chronicles mentions Saw Omma in its coup narrative.) he nevertheless was the first one to attempt a coup. He and his forces crossed the river by military transport boats from Sagaing to Ava. But as his boat was about to dock at the Ava pier, a strong, sudden gust of wind pushed him and the chair (Note: The chair's name in the chronicles is spelled "ခင်တုရင်" (or ""ခင်တရင်"), an archaic Burmese word. Per the editors of the (Yazawin Thit 2012), it means a chair covered by an umbrella with a moonroof, and it is usually found on a Hlawga (လှော်ကား) style military transport boat.) he was sitting on into the river, and he subsequently died in the river.

== Military service ==
The following is a list of military campaigns in which Yazathingyan is explicitly mentioned in the royal chronicles as a commander.

| Campaign | Duration | Troops commanded (Note: Chronicle reported troop levels reduced by an order of magnitude per (Harvey 1925: 333–336)) | Notes |
|---|---|---|---|
| First Ava invasion of Hanthawaddy | 1385–1386 | 1 regiment (1000 troops) | Served in the 1st Army commanded by Crown Prince Tarabya |
| Second Ava invasion of Hanthawaddy | 1386–1387 | 1 regiment | Part of the naval flotilla under the overall command of King Swa that invaded via the Irrawaddy River |
| Third Ava invasion of Hanthawaddy | 1390–1391 | 1 regiment | Served under the command of Crown Prince Tarabya |

== Bibliography ==
- Aung-Thwin, Michael A. (2017). Myanmar in the Fifteenth Century. Honolulu: University of Hawai'i Press. ISBN 978-0-8248-6783-6.
- Kala, U (2006) [1724]. Maha Yazawin (in Burmese). Vol. 1–3 (4th printing ed.). Yangon: Ya-Pyei Publishing.
- Harvey, G. E. (1925). History of Burma: From the Earliest Times to 10 March 1824. London: Frank Cass & Co. Ltd.
- Maha Sithu (2012) [1798]. Kyaw Win; Thein Hlaing (eds.). Yazawin Thit (in Burmese). Vol. 1–3 (2nd ed.). Yangon: Ya-Pyei Publishing.
- Royal Historical Commission of Burma (2003) [1832]. Hmannan Yazawin (in Burmese). Vol. 1–3. Yangon: Ministry of Information, Myanmar.
- Sandalinka, Shin (2009) [1781]. Mani Yadanabon (in Burmese) (4th printing ed.). Yangon: Seit-Ku Cho Cho.
- Taw, Sein Ko; Emanuel Forchhammer; Tun Nyein (1899). Inscriptions of Pagan, Pinya and Ava: Translation, with Notes. Rangoon: Archaeological Survey of India.

Yazathingyan (14th-century minister) Ava Kingdom Born: c. 1330s Died: c. October 1400
| Preceded by Saw Me | Governor of Sagaing by 1383–1400 | Succeeded by Theiddat |
