= Saw Pale of Yamethin =

Saw Pale စောပုလဲ

Duchess of Yamethin
- Tenure: c. 1351 – 1395/96
- Predecessor: Khame Mi
- Born: c. 1331 c. 693 ME; Thayet; Pinya Kingdom
- Spouse: Thilawa of Yamethin
- Issue: Min Hla Myat unnamed daughter
- House: Pinya
- Father: Min Shin Saw of Thayet
- Mother: Shin Myat Hla of Prome
- Religion: Theravada Buddhism

Saw Pale (Burmese: စောပုလဲ, pronounced [sɔ́ pəlɛ́]) was duchess of Yamethin c. 1351 to 1395/96. She was the eldest younger sister of King Swa Saw Ke of Ava, the mother of Queen Min Hla Myat of Ava, and the maternal grandmother of King Kale Kye-Taung Nyo of Ava.

== Ancestry ==
Saw Pale was descended from the Pagan royalty from both sides, and was a grandniece of King Thihathu of Pinya.

Ancestry of Saw Pale of Yamethin

8. Narathihapate
4. Kyawswa of Pagan
9. Shin Hpa of Pagan
2. Min Shin Saw of Thayet
10. Yazathingyan of Pagan
5. Saw Soe of Pagan
11. Saw Khin Htut of Pagan
1. Saw Pale
12. Narathihapate
6. Thihathu of Prome
13. Shin Mauk of Pagan
3. Shin Myat Hla of Prome
14. Theinkha Bo
7. Atula Dewi of Prome
15. Lady Myinsaing

== Bibliography ==
- Royal Historical Commission of Burma (2003) [1832]. Hmannan Yazawin (in Burmese). Vol. 1–3. Yangon: Ministry of Information, Myanmar.

Saw Pale of Yamethin Ava Kingdom Born: c. 1331
Royal titles
Preceded by Khame Mi	Duchess of Yamethin c. 1351 – 1395/96	Succeeded by
