= Tarabya of Ava =

Tarabya တရဖျား
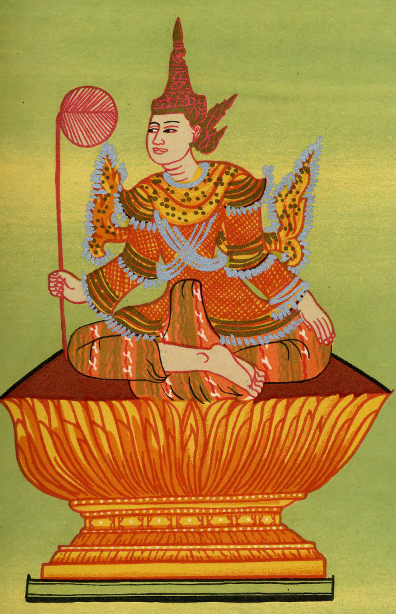
- Tarabya portrayed as the Mintara nat (spirit)

King of Ava
- Reign: April – c. October 1400
- Predecessor: Swa Saw Ke
- Successor: Minkhaung I
- Chief Minister: Min Yaza of Wun Zin
- Born: 22 December 1368; Friday, 13th waxing of Pyatho 730 ME; Ava (Inwa)
- Died: c. October 1400 (Note: Tarabya was dead by the 9th waxing of Nadaw 762 ME, which is conventionally translated as 25 November 1400, or as 26 October 1400. According to a contemporary inscription about King Minkhaung's accession—founded in 762 ME at the Yan Aung-Myin Pagoda, in Tada-U Township—the Great Lord Anawrahta Saw [Minkhaung] in his 28th year [aged 27] ascended the throne on the tha-tin (သတင်) day in the waxing half of the month of Nadaw in the Arthat (Ashadha) year of 762 [ME]. Than Tun translated the date as 25 November 1400, which would be the 9th waxing of Nadaw 762 ME; Than Tun apparently treated 762 ME as a great leap year. If 762 ME were a regular year, the translated date would be Tuesday, 26 October 1400.) before 9th waxing of Nadaw 762 ME; Ava
- Consort: Min Hla Myat
- Issue Detail: Min Nyo; Min Hla Htut
- House: Pinya
- Father: Swa Saw Ke
- Mother: Shin Saw Gyi (or Khame Mi)
- Religion: Theravada Buddhism

Tarabya (Burmese: တရဖျား, pronounced [təɹəbjá] or [təjəpʰjá]; 22 December 1368 – c. October 1400) was king of Ava for about seven months in 1400. He was the heir apparent from 1385 to 1400 during his father King Swa Saw Ke's reign. He was a senior commander in Ava's first three campaigns (1385−91) against Hanthawaddy Pegu in the Forty Years' War. He was assassinated seven months into his rule by his one-time tutor, Gov. Thihapate of Tagaung. The court executed the usurper, and gave the throne to Tarabya's half-brother Min Swe.

Tarabya is remembered as the Mintara (Burmese: မင်းတရား, IPA: [mɪ́ɴ təjá]) nat spirit in the Burmese official pantheon of nats.

== Early life ==
The future king was born in Ava (Inwa) on 22 December 1368 (Note: Various chronicles different birth year of King Tarabya. Zatadawbon Yazawin (Zata 1960: 46, 73) says he was born on Friday, the 14th nekkhat of the 10th month (Pyatho) of 728 ME, which was Wednesday, Full moon of Pyatho 728 (16 December 1366). Yazawin Thit twice suggests that he was born in 1368: 1. (Yazawin Thit Vol. 1 2012: 207−208) says he died in 762 ME (1400/01) in his 32nd year; 2. (Yazawin Thit Vol. 1 2012: 196) says Tarabya was entering his 18th year (turning 17) when he went to the front in 1385. Maha Yazawin (Maha Yazawin Vol. 1 2006: 304−305) and Hmannan Yazawin (Hmannan Vol. 1 2003: 436−438) say he came to power in his 32nd year (age 31) in Natdaw 762 ME (17 November 1400 to 15 December 1400) and died 7 months later, still at age 31, suggesting that he was born in 1369. But a contemporary inscription shows that the Nadaw accession of Maha Yazawin and Hmannan is incorrect but that the Nadaw date was when Tarabya died. The inscription (Than Tun 1959: 128) shows that King Minkhaung I succeeded Tarabya on the 9th waxing of Nadaw 762 ME (25 November 1400), suggesting that Tarabya was likely born in 1368. Finally, Zatadawbon Yazawin says that he died in his 35th year (age 34). But it is most probably a typographical error since (1) Burmese numerals 32 (၃၂) and 35 (၃၅) are quite similar and can easily be mis-copied, and (2) he was given the title Hsinbyushin (Lord of the White Elephant) at birth, which suggests that his father was already king. His father became king on 5 September 1367. This means that Tarabya likely died in his 32nd year as all other chronicles say, and he was born in 730 ME. Thus, 13th waxing of Pyatho 730 ME = Friday, 22 December 1368.) to King Swa Saw Ke of Ava and Queen Shin Saw Gyi (or Queen Khame Mi). (Note: Both Maha Yazawin (Maha Yazawin Vol. 1 2006: 281) and Hmannan (Hmannan Vol. 1 2003: 435) say that Tarabya's mother was Queen Khame Mi. Yazawin Thit (Yazawin Thit Vol. 1 2012: 206) cites a 1401 inscription by Queen Shin Saw Gyi which says that she was "Hsinbyushin Me" (ဆင်ဖြူရှင်မယ်), which Yazawin Thit takes to be "mother of Lord of the White Elephant (Tarabya)". (Yazawin Thit Vol. 1 2012: 206, footnote 3) and (Hmannan Vol. 1 2003: 435): Hmannan rejects Yazawin Thit's correction, saying that the term "Hsinbyushin Me" could also mean a title "Lady Lord of the White Elephant", and that all the prior chronicles say Tarabya's mother was Khame Mi.) Because he was born on the same day as the birth of a white elephant, considered highly propitious symbol of Burmese monarchs, he was given the title "Hsinbyushin" (Lord of the White Elephant). The name was retained although the baby white elephant died soon after. His nickname was Min Na-Kye ("Lord Wide Ears"). He had either two full siblings (one younger brother and one younger sister) or four full siblings (one younger brother and three younger sisters).

Swa Saw Ke groomed his eldest surviving son (Note: (Yazawin Thit Vol. 1 2012: 206): Swa Saw Ke and Khame Mi had a son named Yan Aung Min Ye, who died young.) to be his heir-apparent. But Tarabya saw his two younger half-siblings, Min Swe and Theiddat who were Swa's sons by a concubine as rivals. Because Tarabya kept picking on his half-siblings, the king had to send his two younger sons away from the Ava Palace in 1381/82. Nonetheless, c. April 1385, the king appointed Hsinbyushin his heir-apparent, and married him to Min Hla Myat, the only daughter of the powerful Gov. Thilawa of Yamethin.

== Heir-apparent ==
The only extant record of his years as the heir-apparent concerns his military service in the Ava–Hanthawaddy War (1385–1391). The war was Swa's attempt to take over a divided Mon-speaking kingdom in Lower Burma. Its young king Razadarit controlled only the province, and was facing two rebellions in Martaban and in the Irrawaddy delta.

Tarabya was the overall commander of the 1385–86 campaign which came close to defeating Razadarit. The Ava forces missed their opportunity to finish off Razadarit as Min Swe, the commander of the Second Army, disobeyed Tarabya's order. (Although he and Min Swe were the commanders-in-chief of the two invasion armies, they were aided by Ava's best commanders, including Tarabya's father-in-law Thilawa and Theinkhathu Saw Hnaung.) Tarabya was second-in-command in the next Hanthawaddy campaigns. His army did not achieve any meaning battlefield successes in either of those campaigns. The war then entered a hiatus in early 1391 as the two sides agreed to a truce.

== Reign ==
In April 1400, King Swa died, and Tarabya succeeded. (Note: Tarabya came to power before 9th waxing of Nayon (1 May 1400) since per (Than Tun 1959: 128), he died before 9th waxing of Nadaw (25 November 1400) after having reigned for 7 months per Hmannan and Maha Yazawin. 730 ME was a leap year, and had two Wasos.) But Tarabya's reign was short. According to the chronicles, he became insane five months into his reign after a hunting trip to Aung Pinle (near modern Mandalay). The king was convinced that the beautiful fairy he had sex with in the forest was a representation of Angel Thuyathadi (Saraswati). The king's behavior became totally erratic, and the court now entertained the murmurs of replacing him. Pretenders to the throne began circling. One such pretender, Governor Yazathingyan of Sagaing, had already amassed a force to take over the Ava throne before dying in a freak accident as he disembarked from his war boat at the Ava harbor. The king, who was totally oblivious to the surroundings, was assassinated by his one-time tutor, Governor Thihapate of Tagaung.

Thihapate, known by his given name Nga Nauk Hsan, proclaimed himself king. But the court led by Chief Minister Min Yaza of Wun Zin did not accept the usurper, and executed him. The court gave the throne to Min Swe, who ascended the throne as Minkhaung I on 25 November 1400.

== Veneration as a nat ==
Because of his violent death, Tarabya entered the official pantheon of nats (spirits) as the Mintara nat. He is portrayed sitting on a throne, wearing his royal garments with a fan in his right hand and his left hand resting on his knee.

== Family ==
Tarabya had two children both by his chief queen Min Hla Myat. (Note: (Yazawin Thit Vol. 1 2012: 208) cites an inscription to note that King Tarabya had a son and two daughters, including the middle daughter named Min Phyu. However, (Hmannan Vol. 1 2003: 437–438) rejects the inscription's narrative, and stays with (Maha Yazawin 2006: 305)'s narrative that Tarabya had two issue: Min Nyo and Min Hla Htut.) His elder child, Min Nyo later became king of Ava from 1425 to 1426. His daughter Min Hla Htut was the first wife of Prince (later King) Thihathu of Ava, and later the chief consort of Gov. Saw Shwe Khet of Prome.

== Military service ==
Campaign	Duration	Troops commanded	Summary
Ava–Hanthawaddy War (1385–1391)	1385−86	1st Army; 9 regiments (7000 men, 500 horses, 20 elephants)	Overall commander-in-chief. Invaded from Toungoo (Taungoo); Took Fort Pankyaw after a fierce battle. Bypassed Pegu to assist the 2nd Army at Hlaing (modern Taikkyi). Rushed back to Pankyaw when Razadarit came out of Pegu to retake Pankyaw. Relieved the siege at Pankyaw, engaging Razadarit in elephant to elephant combat. Retreating Razadarit's army was met by Min Swe's army from Hlaing. Tarabya warned Min Swe not to engage the enemy until his troops. But Min Swe ignored his elder brother's order, and engaged Razadarit's army. Min Swe's 2nd Army was routed. Ava armies retreated after five plus months of campaign.
Ava–Hanthawaddy War (1385–1391)	1386−87	1st Army; 11 regiments (12,000 men, 600 horses, 40 elephants)	Second-in-command after King Swa of the overall campaign. 1st Army invaded from Prome, and took Hmawbi. But the army could not take Hlaing, and was bogged down there for a month. Meanwhile, Razadarit retook Hmawbi from 1st Army's rearguard units. Over the next month, Ava armies could not make any headway against any Ramanya strongholds at Dagon, Hlaing, Dala or Hmawbi, and lost many troops from disease and battle. Ava armies retreated close to the rainy season.
Ava–Hanthawaddy War (1385–1391)	1390−91	1st Army; 12 regiments (12,000 men, 1000 horses, 80 elephants)	Second-in-command after King Swa. 1st Army invaded from Toungoo but was stopped at Pankyaw by Razadarit's defenses. Army was bogged down. The main battle was taking place at Gu-Htut (Myan-Aung) on the Irrawaddy. The army retreated after a truce was reached.

== Ancestry ==
Tarabya was descended from Pagan, Myinsaing and Sagaing royal lines.

Ancestry of King Tarabya of Ava

8. Kyawswa of Pagan
4. Min Shin Saw of Thayet
9. Shin Hpa of Pagan
2. Swa Saw Ke of Ava
10. Thihathu of Prome
5. Shin Myat Hla of Prome
11. Atula Dewi of Prome
1. Tarabya
12. Thado Hsinlauk of Tagaung
6. Thado Hsinhtein of Tagaung
13. unnamed
3. Shin Saw Gyi of Sagaing
14. Saw Yun of Sagaing
7. Soe Min of Sagaing
15. Saw Hnaung of Sagaing

== Historiography ==
Source	Birth–Death	Age	Reign	Length of reign	Reference
Zatadawbon Yazawin	16 December 1366 − in or after September 1401	34 (35th year)	1401 − in or after September 1401	5 months	(Note: (Zata 1960: 46, 73): Friday born; 14th nekkhat of the 10th month of 728 ME ≈ Wednesday, 16 December 1366)
Maha Yazawin	1369 − June/July 1401	31 (32nd year)	November/December 1400 − June/July 1401	7 months	(Note: Tarabya became king in Nadaw 762 ME (6 November 1400 to 4 December 1400), and was assassinated after 7 months. Minkhaung ascended the throne after a brief period of power struggle.)
Yazawin Thit	1368 − in or after September 1400	31 (32nd year)	1400 − in or after September 1400	5 months	(Note: Tarabya became king in 762 ME (29 March 1400 to 28 March 1401), and was assassinated after 5 months.)
Hmannan Yazawin	1369 − June/July 1401	31 (32nd year)	November/December 1400 − June/July 1401	7 months	(Note: Tarabya became king in Nadaw 762 ME (6 November 1400 to 4 December 1400), died after having reigned 7 months.)
Mani Yadanabon	1369 − in or after September 1400	31 (32nd year)	1400 − in or after September 1400	5 months 7 days	
Inscriptions	? − by October/November 1400		? − by October/November 1400		

== Bibliography ==
- Hla Thamein. "Thirty-Seven Nats". Yangonow. Archived from the original on 2006-06-24.
- Harvey, G. E. (1925). History of Burma: From the Earliest Times to 10 March 1824. London: Frank Cass & Co. Ltd.
- Htin Aung, Maung (1967). A History of Burma. New York and London: Cambridge University Press.
- Kala, U (2006) [1724]. Maha Yazawin (in Burmese). Vol. 1–3 (4th printing ed.). Yangon: Ya-Pyei Publishing.
- Maha Sithu (2012) [1798]. Myint Swe; Kyaw Win; Thein Hlaing (eds.). Yazawin Thit (in Burmese). Vol. 1–3 (2nd printing ed.). Yangon: Ya-Pyei Publishing.
- Nyein Maung, ed. (1972–1998). Shay-haung Myanma Kyauksa-mya [Ancient Burmese Stone Inscriptions] (in Burmese). Vol. 1–5. Yangon: Archaeological Department.
- Pan Hla, Nai (2005) [1968]. Razadarit Ayedawbon (in Burmese) (8th printing ed.). Yangon: Armanthit Sarpay.
- Royal Historians of Burma (1960) [c. 1680]. U Hla Tin (Hla Thamein) (ed.). Zatadawbon Yazawin. Historical Research Directorate of the Union of Burma.
- Royal Historical Commission of Burma (2003) [1832]. Hmannan Yazawin (in Burmese). Vol. 1–3. Yangon: Ministry of Information, Myanmar.
- Sandalinka, Shin (2009) [1781]. Mani Yadanabon (in Burmese) (4th printing ed.). Yangon: Seit-Ku Cho Cho.
- Than Tun (December 1959). "History of Burma: A.D. 1300–1400". Journal of Burma Research Society. XLII (II).

Tarabya of Ava Ava Kingdom Born: 22 December 1368 Died: c. October 1400
Regnal titles
Preceded by Swa Saw Ke	King of Ava; April 1400 – c. October 1400	Succeeded by Minkhaung I
Royal titles
Preceded by New office	Heir to the Ava Throne; April 1385 – April 1400	Succeeded by Min Nyo
