= Yamethin Township =

Yamethin Township ရမည်းသင်းမြို့နယ်
- Township
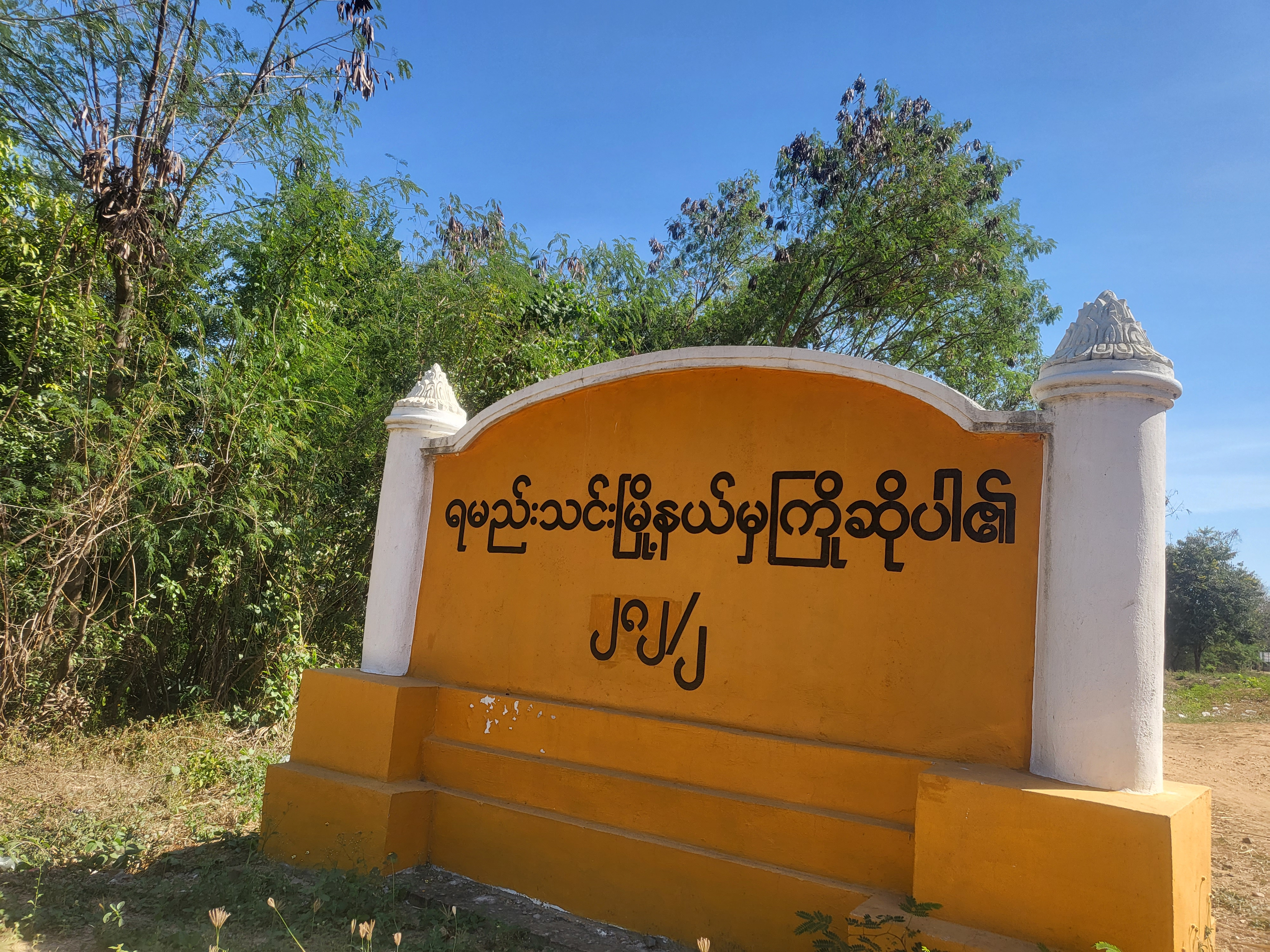
- Yamethin Township welcome sign

- Location in Yamethin district (red colour)

- Location within Myanmar
- Coordinates: 20°25′49″N 96°08′20″E
- Country: Burma
- Region: Mandalay Region
- District: Yamethin
- Capital: Yamethin
- Time zone: UTC+6:30 (MST)

Yamethin Township is a township of Yamethin District in the Mandalay Region of Burma (Myanmar). The administrative seat and principal city is Yamethin, which is also the major rail stop in the township, and it has a population of 258,091.

== Communities ==
Among the many communities in Yamethin Township are: North and South Pyar Si, Upper and Lower Warpyutaung (Wapyudaung), and Yebyu.

== Food ==
Yamethin is known for its fried Tofu, grape plantation, and high production of several crops and paddy.

=== Kyini Lake ===
It was dug by King Kyawswa of Bogan in 1303 A.D. It was restored in 2015 to irrigate 8129 acres of monsoon and summer paddy plantations and provide water to the people of nearby areas.

== History ==
Yamethin Township was established as a town during the time of King Duttabaung in 170 BE (Buddhist Era). The town was formerly known as Nwamethin (နွားမည်းသင်း), in reference to the preponderance of black cows in the area. Over time, the town's name evolved to Namethin and to thin, which is the modern-day name.

== Climate ==
Climate data for Yamethin (1981–2010)
Month	Jan	Feb	Mar	Apr	May	Jun	Jul	Aug	Sep	Oct	Nov	Dec	Year
Mean daily maximum °C (°F)	30.2 (86.4)	33.2 (91.8)	36.3 (97.3)	38.0 (100.4)	35.5 (95.9)	32.4 (90.3)	31.7 (89.1)	31.6 (88.9)	32.3 (90.1)	32.6 (90.7)	30.7 (87.3)	29.2 (84.6)	32.8 (91.0)
Mean daily minimum °C (°F)	13.2 (55.8)	15.3 (59.5)	19.9 (67.8)	24.1 (75.4)	24.5 (76.1)	24.0 (75.2)	23.6 (74.5)	23.5 (74.3)	23.4 (74.1)	22.9 (73.2)	19.2 (66.6)	14.7 (58.5)	20.7 (69.3)
Average rainfall mm (inches)	1.7 (0.07)	2.6 (0.10)	8.8 (0.35)	25.1 (0.99)	136.0 (5.35)	104.8 (4.13)	96.8 (3.81)	117.1 (4.61)	152.4 (6.00)	140.2 (5.52)	48.8 (1.92)	9.3 (0.37)	843.6 (33.21)
Source: Norwegian Meteorological Institute

== Demographics ==
=== 2014 ===
Historical population
Year	Pop.	±%
1973	145,207	—
1983	181,973	+25.3%
2014	258,091	+41.8%
Source: ,

The 2014 Myanmar Census reported that Yamethin Township had a population of 258,091. The population density was 119.1 people per km^{2}. The census reported that the median age was 28.4 years, and a sex ratio of 95 males per 100 females. There were 57,259 households; the mean household size was 4.1.

== List of rulers of Yamethin ==
The following is a list of rulers of the Yamethin region.

Name	Term From	Term Until	Relationship to predecessor(s)	Overlord(s)	Notes
Thihapate	c. 1330s	1351	Appointed	Uzana I of Pinya; Sithu of Pinya (regent); Kyawswa I of Pinya; Kyawswa II of Pinya	Son of Uzana I of Pinya
Swa Saw Ke	1351	1351	Appointed	Kyawswa II of Pinya	
Thilawa	1351	1395/96	Brother-in-law	Kyawswa II of Pinya; Narathu of Pinya; Uzana II of Pinya; Thado Minbya of Ava; Swa Saw Ke of Ava	
Maha Pyauk	1395/96	c. November 1400	Brother	Swa Saw Ke; Tarabya of Ava	
Sithu Pauk Hla	c. November 1400	c. mid-1413	Appointed	Minkhaung I	Son of Chief Minister Min Yaza of Wun Zin
Sithu Thihapate	by November 1413	c. late 1428	Appointed	Minkhaung I; Thihathu of Ava; Min Hla of Ava; Kale Kye-Taung Nyo; Mohnyin Thado	
Toungoo / Yatsauk rule (1428–1444)
Minye Kyawhtin	c. late 1444	c. late 1445	Seized by force	N/A — Independent ruler	In rebellion / Pretender to the Ava throne
...
Minye Kyawswa	c. early 1471 (Note: He was appointed to two different governorships Myedu, followed by Talok before being appointed to Yamethin and the surrounding districts. Chronicles do not provide the exact tenures. All the appointment entries are listed right after his father's accession in July 1468. However, chronicles do say that Sithu Kyawhtin was transferred from Nyaungyan to Toungoo in late 832 ME (early 1471). Thus, Minye Kyawswa's appointment at Yamethin and the surrounding districts, including Nyaungyan, was likely made in or after 1470/71.)	June/July 1501 (Note: Waso 863 ME (15 June 1501–13 July 1501))	Appointed	Thihathura of Ava; Minkhaung II; Narapati II	Lord of Yamethin and the Five Irrigated Districts, Yindaw, Hlaingdet, Nyaungyan, and Paukmyaing
Shwe Nawrahta	June/July 1501	November/December 1501 (Note: Nadaw 863 ME (10 November 1501–8 December 1501))	Appointed	Narapati II	Executed by drowning
Min Uti	February/March 1502 (Note: Tabaung 863 ME (6 February 1502–7 March 1502))	1524/25 (Note: 886 ME (1524/25))	Appointed	Narapati II	Brother-in-law of Narapati II

== Bibliography ==
- Kala, U (2006) [1724]. Maha Yazawin (in Burmese). Vol. 1–3 (4th printing ed.). Yangon: Ya-Pyei Publishing.
- Maha Sithu (2012) [1798]. Myint Swe; Kyaw Win; Thein Hlaing (eds.). Yazawin Thit (in Burmese). Vol. 1–3 (2nd printing ed.). Yangon: Ya-Pyei Publishing.
- Royal Historical Commission of Burma (2003) [1832]. Hmannan Yazawin (in Burmese). Vol. 1–3. Yangon: Ministry of Information, Myanmar.
