= Thihapate of Tagaung =

Thihapate သီဟပတေ့

Governor of Tagaung
- In office c. September 1367 – November 1400
- Monarchs: Swa Saw Ke (1367−1400); Tarabya (1400)
- Preceded by: Thado Minbya

Personal details
- Born: Nauk Hsan c. 1340s
- Died: November 1400; Nadaw 726 ME Ava (Inwa)

Thihapate of Tagaung (Burmese: သီဟပတေ့, [θìha̰pətḛ]; also known as Nga Nauk Hsan (ငနောက်ဆံ, [ŋə naʊ̯ʔ sʰàɴ]); d. November 1400) was governor of Tagaung from 1367 to 1400. The powerful governor of the northernmost vassal state of Ava was a brother-in-law of King Swa Saw Ke, (Note: (Hmannan Vol. 1 2003: 414) says Thihapate of Tagaung was Swa's brother-in-law. Since Swa's three sisters were married to some other people per (Hmannan Vol. 1 2003: 403), Swa must have been married to at least one sister of Thihapate. At any rate, Thihapate's sister(s) was apparently not a principal queen since she is not listed in the chronicles.) and had even served as a tutor to Crown Prince Tarabya. In 1380/81, he was even considered by King Swa Saw Ke as a candidate to become king of Arakan although he was ultimately passed over.

Thihapate came to Ava (Inwa) in 1400 to serve as an advisor to his one-time pupil Tarabya, who had become king. With Tarabya becoming mentally unstable, Thihapate assassinated the young king in November 1400, and tried to seize the throne. But the Ava court did not accept him, promptly executed him.

== Bibliography ==
- Htin Aung, Maung (1967). A History of Burma. New York and London: Cambridge University Press.
- Royal Historical Commission of Burma (2003) [1832]. Hmannan Yazawin (in Burmese). Vol. 1–3. Yangon: Ministry of Information, Myanmar.
- Than Tun (December 1959). "History of Burma: A.D. 1300–1400". Journal of Burma Research Society. XLII (II).

Thihapate of Tagaung Ava Kingdom Born: c. 1340s Died: November 1400
Royal titles
Preceded by Thado Minbya	Governor of Tagaung; 1367 – 1400	Succeeded by
