= Theiddat =

Theiddat သိဒ္ဓတ်

Governor of Sagaing
- Reign: 1400 – 1407
- Predecessor: Yazathingyan
- Successor: Thihathu

Heir Presumptive of Ava
- Reign: 25 November 1400 – c. December 1406
- Predecessor: Tarabya (as heir-apparent)
- Successor: Minye Kyawswa (as heir-apparent)
- Born: 1375/76 (Note: (Hmannan Vol. 1 2003: 439): Theiddat was two years younger than Minkhaung I. Since Minkhaung was born in September 1373, Theiddat was born in 1375 or early 1376.); Pyinzi, Ava Kingdom
- Died: c. July 1408; Pegu, Hanthawaddy kingdom
- Spouse: Daughter of Yazathu of Talok
- House: Ava
- Father: Swa Saw Ke
- Mother: Saw Beza
- Religion: Theravada Buddhism

Theiddat (Pali: Siddhattha, Burmese: သိဒ္ဓတ်, pronounced [θeiʔdaʔ]; 1375/76–1408) was the heir-presumptive of Ava from 1400 to 1406 during the reign of King Minkhaung I of Ava. Theiddat was the key figure in securing his elder brother Minkhaung I's claim on the throne of Ava. In the early days of Minkhaung's reign, Theiddat personally led an army to put down a major rebellion. After Minkhaung named his eldest son Minye Kyawswa heir apparent in 1406, Theiddat felt betrayed, and fled south in 1407 and joined the service of King Razadarit of Hanthawaddy Pegu, which was amidst fighting the Forty Years' War (1385–1424) with Ava.

It turned out that Theiddat could not betray his brother. In 1408, Theiddat, who was with a special group of Hanthawaddy forces who were waiting to ambush Minkhaung, gave a warning to his brother at a critical moment, allowing him to escape. Theiddat was duly executed by Razadarit for his warning.

== Early life ==
Minkhaung and Theiddat were sons of King Swa Saw Ke by Saw Beza whom he had met during one of his military campaigns. As their mother was a commoner, they were not in line for the throne. Swa had designated Prince Tarabya as crown prince.

== Minkhaung's accession ==
In April 1400, their father died and Tarabya ascended the throne. In November 1400, Tarabya was assassinated by Nga Nauk Hsan, the governor of Tagaung who tried to seize the throne. The ministers put the usurper to death, and gave the throne to Minkhaung. His ascension was greeted by a major rebellion led by Gov. Maha Pyauk of Yamethin. Pyauk marched to Ava with a force of 10,000 men, 60 attack elephants and 800 horses. Theiddat led Ava's defenses, and defeated the stronger rebel force, killing Maha Pyauk. In gratitude, Minkhaung gave Theiddat Sagaing to rule but stopped short of declaring him heir-apparent. The younger brother was never satisfied with the reward he received for his help, and held a lingering resentment that would rear its ugly head later.

== Single combat with Minkhaung ==
In 1406, Minkhaung named his eldest son Minye Kyawswa as heir apparent. His brother Theiddat, who had loyally supported Minkhaung in time of his need, felt betrayed, and challenged Minkhaung to an elephant-to-elephant single combat. Minkhaung defeated his younger brother but allowed him to leave. Theiddat took refuge in Razadarit's service. Razadarit welcomed Theiddat and gave him his sister in marriage.

== Foiling of Minkhaung's assassination and death ==
In May 1408, Minkhaung invaded the south and reached the outskirts of Pegu. Razadarit tried to break the siege by sending special forces to assassinate Minkhaung. Minkhaung escaped death on the warning by his brother Theiddat who was with Pegu troops to ambush him. Theiddat was later executed by Razadarit for his warning.

== Bibliography ==
- Jon Fernquest (Spring 2006). "Rajadhirat's Mask of Command: Military Leadership in Burma (c. 1384–1421)" (PDF). SBBR. 4 (1). Archived from the original (PDF) on 2009-02-19.
- Harvey, G. E. (1925). History of Burma: From the Earliest Times to 10 March 1824. London: Frank Cass & Co. Ltd.
- Htin Aung, Maung (1967). A History of Burma. New York and London: Cambridge University Press.
- Maha Sithu (2012) [1798]. Kyaw Win; Thein Hlaing (eds.). Yazawin Thit (in Burmese). Vol. 1–3 (2nd ed.). Yangon: Ya-Pyei Publishing.
- Royal Historical Commission of Burma (2003) [1832]. Hmannan Yazawin (in Burmese). Vol. 1–3. Yangon: Ministry of Information, Myanmar.

Theiddat Ava Kingdom Born: 1375/76 Died: c. July 1408
Royal titles
Preceded by Yazathingyan	Governor of Sagaing; 1400–1407	Succeeded by Thihathu
Preceded by Tarabya as heir-apparent	Heir Presumptive to the Burmese Throne; 1400–1406	Succeeded by Minye Kyawswa as heir-apparent
