= Nga Nu =

Pretender to the Ava throne

Commander Nga Nu

Commander of the Inner Household Guards
- In office April 1364 – September 1367
- Monarch: Thado Minbya

Personal details
- Born: Nu Sagaing Kingdom
- Spouse: Saw Omma of Pinya (1367)

Military service
- Allegiance: Ava Kingdom
- Branch/service: Royal Burmese Army
- Years of service: 1364–1367
- Rank: Commander
- Commands: Inner Royal Household Guards
- Battles/wars: Battle of Sagu (1367)

Commander Nga Nu also known as Athwinthin Hmu Nga Nu (Note: Athwinthin Hmu means "Captain/Commander of the Inner Royal Household Guards".) (Burmese: အတွင်းသင်းမှူး ငနု, [ʔətwɪ́ɴθɪ́ɴ m̥ú ŋə nṵ]) was a military commander in the service of King Thado Minbya of Ava, and a close adviser to the king. After the death of Thado Minbya in September 1367, the commander tried to seize the throne with the help of Queen Saw Omma. He got Saw Omma to his side by telling her that Thado Minbya had ordered him to kill his chief queen lest she should pass to another man. With the threat, he got Saw Omma to marry him.

The coup failed despite he and his men having tried killing off anyone who opposed them at the palace. The court was not ready to accept Nga Nu, a commoner from both sides, as king. The couple fled to Sagaing where they hoped to revive the old Sagaing Kingdom. But they never gained the support of former vassals of Sagaing. When the new king Swa Saw Ke sent a battalion commanded by Nga Nu's brother Yazathingyan Nga Mauk, Nga Nu fled while Saw Omma was captured.

He and his men remained active at the northern edges of the kingdom for the next few years. From their base in Lahu (present-day Myadaung in Katha District), they raided northern towns from time to time.

== Bibliography ==
- Harvey, G. E. (1925). History of Burma: From the Earliest Times to 10 March 1824. London: Frank Cass & Co. Ltd.
- Royal Historical Commission of Burma (2003) [1832]. Hmannan Yazawin (in Burmese). Vol. 1–3. Yangon: Ministry of Information, Myanmar.
