= Min Yaza of Wun Zin =

Chief minister of Ava from 1379-80

Min: Yaza; မင်းရာဇာ
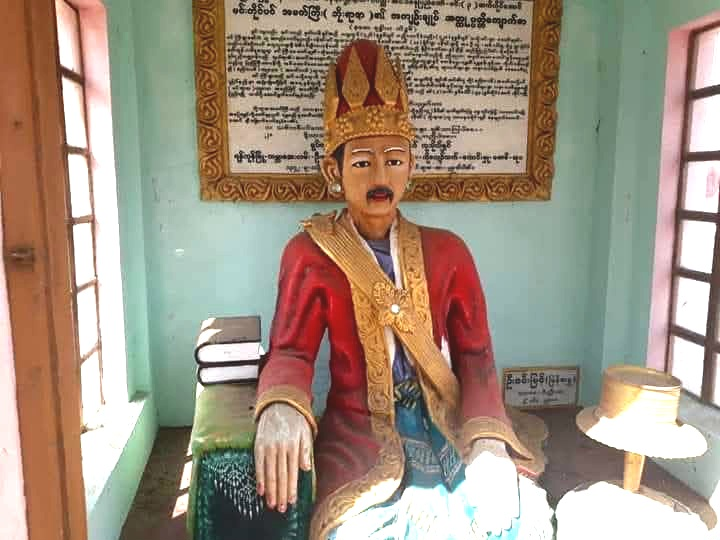

Chief Minister
- In office 1379/80–1421
- Monarchs: Swa Saw Ke (1379/80−1400); Tarabya (1400); Minkhaung I (1400–21)

Minister
- In office 1369–1379/80
- Monarch: Swa Saw Ke (1369−79/80)
- Preceded by: Sitapyit the Elder

Personal details
- Born: Nga Nyo: 1347/48; c. 709 ME; Wun Zin, Pinya Kingdom
- Died: 1421 (aged 73); early 783 ME; Ava (Inwa), Kingdom of Ava
- Spouses: Me Chit; Unnamed daughter of a Pegu minister
- Children: Sithu Pauk Hla of Yamethin; Saw Ma Lay of Badon; Saw Yin of Badon; Governor of Yenantha
- Profession: Government minister, writer
- Nickname(s): Po Yaza, Maung Okka

Military service
- Allegiance: Kingdom of Ava
- Branch/service: Royal Burmese Army
- Rank: Commander

Min Yaza of Wun Zin (Burmese: ဝန်စင်း မင်းရာဇာ or ဝန်ဇင်းမင်းရာဇာ, pronounced [wùɴ zɪ́ɴ mɪ́ɴ jàzà]; also known as Po Yaza (ဘိုးရာဇာ, [pʰó jàzà]); 1347/48−1421) was chief minister of Ava from 1379/80 to 1421. He was the main adviser to three successive kings of Ava: Swa Saw Ke, Tarabya and Minkhaung I. Under his guidance, Ava made several attempts to restore the Pagan Empire, and methodically acquired its immediate surrounding Shan states between 1371 and 1406. By his death in 1421, he had advised his kings almost for the entire duration of the Forty Years' War (1385–1424) between Ava and Pegu.

The influential court treatise Zabu Kun-Cha, which includes Machiavellian political principles, and mentions several archaeologically known Pyu settlements unmentioned in other prior Burmese chronicles, is attributed to Min Yaza.

== Early life ==
Yaza was born Nga Nyo (ငညို, [ŋə ɲò]) to Daw Chon (ဒေါ်ချုံ, [dɔ̀ tɕʰòʊ̯ɴ]) and her herbalist physician husband Saya Ohn (ဆရာ အုန်း, [sʰəjà ʔóʊ̯ɴ]) in 1347/48. His parents were athi commoners—those who did not live on royal land and paid substantial taxes but owed no regular military service. His zata or Burmese zodiac name was Maung Okka "Mr. Meteor" (မောင် ဥက္ကာ, [màʊ̯ɴ ʔoʊ̯ʔkà]) because a sizable meteor passed through the night he was born.

Nyo grew up in his native village of Wun Zin, about 15 kilometres (9.3 mi) from Meiktila. He began his primary education at a local monastic school where proved to be a brilliant student, mastering all the subjects in just two years. His father died c. 1355, and his mother sent the 7-year-old to another monastic school for further education. By his teens, he was already collecting manuscripts, copying stone inscriptions and ink writings at local temples and pagodas, and participating in literary seminars alongside adults. At 14, he began tilling the fields as a farmer but he continued to pursue his hobbies of historical research and book collecting. He became well known in the region as "Sa To Nga Nyo" (Nyo the literary works collector). In his late teens, he married Me Chit, daughter of the village headman, U Moe. According to legend, his father-in-law had a rather low opinion of Nyo whom he deemed a talker and not a hardworking farmer. Nonetheless, Moe gave the couple a pair of cattle and three pes (2.13 hectares) of paddy fields, and allowed them to stay at his farmhouse.

== Royal service ==
=== Joining the service ===
Nyo's opportunity to escape the village life came when he was 20. In 1368, King Swa Saw Ke came to the Meiktila region with an army of men to restore the broken levee of the Meiktila Lake. When the king inquired about the small golden statue of a young woman in what appeared to be a nat shrine on the embankment, the locals referred Nyo to the king as someone who might know the answer. Summoned before the king, Nyo explained that based on his research the statue was donated by King Anawrahta (r. 1044–77) of Pagan in memory of his young/junior queen consort, (Note: Exact Burmese term per (MSK 1979: 362) was မိဖုရားငယ်, which could mean a junior queen, young queen, or both.) who died at the location, and that Anawrahta had also buried another statue underneath the embankment. A skeptical Swa had his men dig beneath the shrine, and the men found another female statue as Nyo predicted. Impressed by the villager's command of history and knowledge, Swa asked Nyo to enter the royal service. Nyo, his wife and his father-in-law were all brought to the capital Ava (Inwa).

=== Swa Saw Ke years ===
At Ava, Nyo quickly made his mark. Though he started out as a low-level clerk at the court, Nyo came to be consulted for advice by the king. About a year later, a junior minister at the court died, and Swa appointed Nyo to the position, which came with the title of Sitapyit (စည်းတပြစ်, [sídəbjɪʔ]). Though still only in his early twenties, Nyo quickly rose to be the main adviser to the king on the strength of his early advice proving right. His firstwell-known advice recorded in the Burmese chronicles concerned Ava's northern policy. The king, who wished restore the erstwhile Pagan Empire, eyed the various Shan states that now surrounded his Ava Kingdom from the northwest to the southeast. In 1370/71, two northern Shan states of Kalay and Mohnyin were at war, and Nyo advised the king to march to the two states only after they had fought it out and were left exhausted. The king followed the advice, and was able to take over both states in 1371. When Mohnyin was retaken by the Shan state of Maw soon after the Ava armies left, he advised the king not to overstretch, and redraw Ava's northern border farther south to a more defensible Myedu. In 1372–73, Maw forces attacked Myedu to reclaim Mohnyin's former territory but were decisively defeated by Ava forces. The decisive victory brought Upper Burma a respite from Maw raids for the next 14 years. (Note: (Yazawin Thit Vol. 1 2012: 199): Mohnyin raided again while Ava was deep in the Forty Years' War, forcing Swa to launch a campaign against Mohnyin in 1387–88.)

The king relied on the minister for advice on all major decisions for the rest of his reign. He promoted Nyo to chief minister in 1379/80 with the title of Min Yaza. (Note: (MSK 1979: 363) (Yazawin Thit Vol. 1 2012: 211) (Hmannan Vol. 1 2003: 442–443): Chronicles say that he received the title of Min Yaza during the reign of King Minkhaung I. But according to the inscription at the Buddhist pagoda the minister himself donated at the Eingon village per (Khin Maung Nyunt 2016: 8–9), he was bestowed the title of Min Yaza in 741 ME (30 March 1379 – 28 March 1380) in his 32nd year (age 31). The same inscription says that he entered King Swa's service in his 21st year (age 20).) To be sure, not all of his advice turned out right. In 1380/81 (or 1383/84), (Note: This is another case of Burmese numerals ၂ (2) and ၅ (5) being miscopied: Main chronicles (Hmannan Vol. 1 2003: 410–413) say Saw Mon died in 742 ME (1380/81). But Mani Yadanabon (Mani Yadanabon 2009: 62) says he died in 745 ME (1383/84).) he advised against the king's top four nominees for the western kingdom of Arakan's throne, and agreed to Saw Me as the candidate. (Note: See (Hmannan Vol. 1 2003: 414–415) and (Mani Yadanabon 2009: 62–63) for Yaza's recommendations for the next king of Arakan. According to (Harvey 1925: 86), the nominee was Swa's own son by the daughter of Yaza. But the chronicles (Hmannan Vol. 1 2003: 414–415) do not list Saw Me as a son; they mention him as a long-time loyal servant of Swa. Moreover, according to the chronicles, Swa met Yaza only in 1368/69 (730 ME) and never mentioned Swa being married to Yaza's daughters. Even if Swa had married Yaza's daughter in 1368, their son would only be about 11 years old in 1380.) Saw Me turned out to be a tyrant, and was driven out of Arakan in 1385/86. Likewise, his advice to the king to accept the offer of Gov. Laukpya of Myaungmya to attack the Hanthawaddy kingdom resulted in three failed campaigns between 1385 and 1391. (Note: See (Maha Yazawin Vol. 1 2006: 290–293, 295–297, 300–302) for Ava's first three failed campaigns of the Forty Years' War.)

=== Minkhaung years ===
After King Swa's death in 1400, Min Yaza continued his role as chief minister under the new king, Tarabya. But Tarabya's reign lasted only seven months; the new king was assassinated in November 1400. The court led by Yaza placed Prince Minkhaung, Swa's son by a concubine, on the throne (although the court's selection was later unsuccessfully challenged by Gov. Maha Pyauk of Yamethin). A grateful Minkhaung kept Yaza as the chief minister, whom he called "grandpa". He also appointed Yaza's son Pauk Hla governor Yamethin, and Yaza's son-in-law Thado Theinkhathu governor of Badon and Tabayin. (Note: According to (Mani Yadanabon 2009: 191), Yaza had another son who was governor of Yenantha. But Mani does not mention when that son was appointed.)

Yaza was now fully part of the power structure of the Ava regime. The old minister advised Minkhaung during the difficult early years (1401–02) when the country came under attack by Razadarit. Ava survived the invasion, and Yaza led the Ava delegation that negotiated a truce in early 1403. (Note: (Yazawin Thit Vol. 1 2012: 220–221): Attempts to reach a truce began about 10 days after Ava forces defeated Pegu forces at the battle of Nawin near Prome on Tuesday, 3rd waxing of Tabodwe 764 ME (26 December 1402). It means the first attempt to negotiate began around 5 January 1403.) Though not a military man, Yaza was officially the commander of the army that accompanied the delegation to the Hanthawaddy capital Pegu (Bago). In all, he and his delegation spent five months in Pegu. King Razadarit was impressed by the old minister's intellect, and gave a daughter of a Hanthawaddy minister in marriage. Yaza and the young wife had a child, Saw Yin, later governor of Badon.

Back in Ava, Yaza guided Minkhaung who set out on acquiring the surrounding states in the following years. He personally led the 1404/05 embassy to Onbaung (Hsipaw) that resulted in Onbaung's submission. He got the neighboring Nyaungshwe and Mohnyin to submit in 1405/06 and 1406 respectively. (Note: Chronicles (Yazawin Thit Vol. 1 2012: 224–225) and (Hmannan Vol. 1 2003: 445–446, 467) say that Nyaungshwe and Mohnyin submitted in 767 ME (1405/06) and 768 ME (1406/07) respectively. According to Ming records, per (Fernquest 2006: 51), Ava had acquired Bhamo, Mohnyin, and Kalay by 25 August 1406 when the Ming court sent an envoy to Ava in response.) (Ava also acquired Arakan in 1406 but the main chronicles do not explicitly mention Yaza or the court in the invasion decision.) Nonetheless, Yaza apparently was the power behind the throne: the king accepted his chief minister's recommendations for governorships at Kalay and Mohnyin. He advised Minkhaung to appoint Kye Taung Nyo, the eldest son of Minkhaung's predecessor Tarabya to the faraway Shan state of Kalay (by the Manipur border) while advising the appointment of Thado, a proven commander, to the crucial northern Shan state of Mohnyin.

The year 1406 was apparently the pinnacle of Yaza's influence. After Crown Prince Minye Kyawswa's successful 1406 Arakan campaign, Minkhaung increasingly relied on his highly militaristic son for policy. For his part, Yaza carried on. In 1406, at the king's behest, Yaza unsuccessfully tried to mollify Theiddat, who believed he should have been the heir-apparent. The minister persuaded Minkhaung not to execute his younger brother but Theiddat defected to Hanthawaddy soon after. In April 1408, Minkhaung famously ignored Yaza's advice to wait until after the rainy season to invade Hanthawaddy, which had driven out the Ava appointed king from Arakan and taken Minkhaung's daughter captive. Yaza accompanied Minkhaung to the front. After three months, the Ava armies were bogged down in the rainy season weather, and were starving. Minkhaung sent Yaza and Yaza's son Sithu of Yamethin to negotiate a truce but the Ava delegation retreated after suspecting an ambush attempt by Hanthawaddy troops.

According to the chronicles, after the disastrous invasion, Min Yaza had to persuade the king to reappoint the latter's favorite queen Shin Bo-Me, who was temporarily lost during the disastrous retreat, as a senior queen again. Minkhaung had demoted her because he suspected she had become involved with the mahout who found her, and brought back to Ava. Minkhaung accepted Yaza's advice. A restored Bo-Me was grateful; she gave the old minister lavish gifts. It was the last mention of Yaza before his death in the standard chronicles. His last advice to the king recorded in the court treatise Mani Yadanabon came in 1413/14 (775 ME).

Min Yaza died in 1421 at 73, a few months before Minkhaung's own death. (Note: Chronicles (Maha Yazawin Vol. 2 2006: 55) and (Hmannan Vol. 2 2003: 51) say that Yaza died in 783 ME (30 March 1421 to 29 March 1422). But he apparently died in early-to-mid 783 ME (1421) as Minkhaung was still alive for several more months. Yaza's age of 73 is per (Khin Maung Nyunt 2016: 8–9), which however is inconsistent; it says the minister was born in 1347 and died in 1423 in his 74th year. But according to the Eingon Shwezigon Pagoda inscription donated by Yaza himself, the minister was in his 32nd year (aged 31) in 741 ME (30 March 1379 to 28 March 1380), meaning he was born in either 1347 or 1348, and could not have been in his 74th year in 1423.)

== Writer ==
The influential court treatise Zabu Kun-Cha is attributed to Min Yaza. The treatise is a compilation of the famous advice offered by Yaza to kings from Swa Saw Ke to Minkhaung. The text also includes a section on early history of Myanmar, which mentions several settlements across Myanmar that map to the archaeologically known Pyu settlements. According to Hudson, the author(s) of Zabu (Min Yaza or otherwise) knew that "the sites they listed all had some kind of archaeological evidence of antiquity. Kaungsin, Allagappa and Legaing, not prominent in other chronicles, were known to the author(s) when the Zabu was written."

The Zabu was later included in the 1781 treatise Mani Yadanabon, which also includes advice by later ministers. The Zabu portion represents "somewhat half under the total". The Zabu portion has been described as "a repository of historical examples illustrating pragmatic political principles worthy of Machiavelli."

== In popular culture ==
Min Yaza is best remembered in Burmese history for his encounter with Minister Thihapate of Hanthawaddy during the first truce negotiations between Ava and Pegu in 1403. Yaza recounted in Zabu how his counterpart bested him in an impromptu philosophical debate in which Thihapate argued in support of the concept of carpe diem, and Yaza argued for delayed gratification. After a respectful and polite exchange, Yaza conceded his defeat.

In 1912, a biography of the minister, called Wun Zin Po Yaza Wuthtu was published by Maung Maung, a school headmaster of Prome (Pyay). The Fine and Performing Arts Department produced a traditional Burmese opera titled "Wun Zin Po Yaza", which was performed between 1965 and 1973 in Myanmar as well as abroad.

== Commemorations ==
- Wun Zin Min Yaza Hall, Ministry of Foreign Affairs, Yangon
- Po Yaza Street, Yankin Township and North Dagon Township, Yangon
- Po Yaza Street, Mandalay

== Bibliography ==
- Aung-Thwin, Michael A. (2005). The Mists of Rāmañña: The Legend that was Lower Burma (illustrated ed.). Honolulu: University of Hawaiʻi Press. ISBN 978-0-8248-2886-8.
- Fernquest, Jon (Autumn 2006). "Crucible of War: Burma and the Ming in the Tai Frontier Zone (1382–1454)" (PDF). SOAS Bulletin of Burma Research. 4 (2).
- Harvey, G. E. (1925). History of Burma: From the Earliest Times to 10 March 1824. London: Frank Cass & Co. Ltd.
- Hudson, Bob (2004). The Origins of Bagan: The archaeological landscape of Upper Burma to AD 1300 (PhD thesis). The University of Sydney.
- Kala, U (2006) [1724]. Maha Yazawin (in Burmese). Vol. 1–3 (4th printing ed.). Yangon: Ya-Pyei Publishing.
- Khin Maung Nyunt (2016-07-06). "Minkyi Swa Saw Ke, Wunzin Pho Yaza and Meikhtila Lake" (PDF). The Global New Light of Myanmar. Yangon. pp. 8–9.
- Lieberman, Victor B. (1983). "Review of L. E. Bagshawe "The Maniyadanabon of Shin Sandalinka"". Journal of the Royal Asiatic Society of Great Britain & Ireland. New Series (115). Cambridge University: 336–337. doi:10.1017/S0035869X00138018. S2CID 163320689.
- Lieberman, Victor B. (2003). Strange Parallels: Southeast Asia in Global Context, c. 800–1830, volume 1, Integration on the Mainland. Cambridge University Press. ISBN 978-0-521-80496-7.
- Maha Sithu (2012) [1798]. Myint Swe; Kyaw Win; Thein Hlaing (eds.). Yazawin Thit (in Burmese). Vol. 1–3 (2nd printing ed.). Yangon: Ya-Pyei Publishing.
- Myanma Swezon Kyan (in Burmese). Vol. 8 (2 ed.). Yangon: Sarpay Beikman. 1979. pp. 362–363.
- Sandalinka, Shin (2009) [1781]. Mani Yadanabon (in Burmese) (4th printing ed.). Yangon: Seit-Ku Cho Cho.
- Tun Aung Chain. Selected Writings of Tun Aung Chain. Myanmar Historical Commission. p. 211.
- Wade, Geoff (2012). "6". The Oxford History of Historical Writing. Vol. 3: 1400–1800. Oxford University Press. ISBN 978-0-19-162944-0.
- Woolf, Daniel R. (2011). A Global History of History (reissue, illustrated ed.). Cambridge, UK: Cambridge University Press. ISBN 978-0-521-69908-2.
