= Myedu =

Myedu မြေဒူးမြို့
- Township of Yangon
- Myedu
- Location within Myanmar
- Coordinates: 23°11′0″N 95°24′0″E
- Country: Myanmar
- Region: Sagaing
- Township: Kanbalu
- Town: Myedu

Population
  - Total: 42,000
- Time zone: UTC6:30 (MST)

Myedu (Burmese: မြေဒူးမြို့ [mjèdú mjo̰]) is a small town located in Kanbalu Township, Sagaing Region, Myanmar (Burma). The town was the fief of King Hsinbyushin (r. 1763–1776) of Konbaung Dynasty, who was also known as Myedu Min; (lit. 'Myedu King').
