= Nadaw =

Ninth month of the Burmese calendar

Nadaw (Burmese: နတ်တော်; also spelt Natdaw) is the ninth month of the traditional Burmese calendar.

== Festivals and observances ==
- Mahagiri Nat Festival, Mount Popa
- Literature and Arts Festival (စာဆိုတော်နေ့)
- Pagoda festivals
  - Botahtaung Pagoda Festival (Yangon)

== Nadaw symbols ==
- Flower: Bulbophyllum auricomum

== See also ==
- Burmese calendar
- Festivals of Burma
