= Baya Gamani of Singu =

Baya Gamani
- ဘယဂါမဏိ

Governor of Singu
- In office c. December 1427 – c. 1450?
- Monarchs: Mohnyin Thado (1427–1439); Minye Kyawswa I (1439–1442); Narapati I (1442–c. 1450)
- Preceded by: Vacant
- Succeeded by: Min Phyu of Sagaing as governor of Sagaing and ten northern towns

Co-Chief Minister of Ava
- In office November 1425 – May 1426
- Monarch: Min Nyo (1425–1426)
- Succeeded by: Yazathingyan

Governor of Singu
- In office c. 1401 – May 1426
- Monarchs: Minkhaung I (1401–1421); Thihathu (1421–1425); Min Hla (1425); Min Nyo (1425–1426)
- Preceded by: Min Letwe? (Note: All three main chronicles (Maha Yazawin Vol. 1 2006: 334), (Yazawin Thit Vol. 1 2012: 229) and (Hmannan Vol. 1 2003: 476) mistakenly report that Min Letwe was governor of Singu in 1408 even they have previously reported that Gamani became governor of Singu soon after Minkhaung's accession. In the subsequent pages, Gamani was still governor of Singu.)
- Succeeded by: Vacant

Personal details
- Born: c. 1380s Ava Kingdom
- Spouse: Unnamed (divorced)

Military service
- Allegiance: Ava Kingdom
- Branch/service: Royal Ava Army
- Years of service: 1401–1440s
- Rank: Commander
- Battles/wars: Ava–Hanthawaddy War (1401–1403); Ava–Hanthawaddy War (1408–1418); Mohnyin rebellion (1425–1426); Ava civil wars (1427–1441); Chinese invasions (1440s)

Baya Gamani of Singu (Burmese: စဉ့်ကူး ဘယဂါမဏိ, pronounced [sɪ̰ɰ̃ɡú bəja̯ gàmənḭ]; also spelled Bhayakamani) was a 15th-century court minister and royal army commander in the service of seven kings of Ava from Minkhaung I to Narapati I. He also served two terms as governor of Singu (c. 1401–1426), and (1427–c. 1450s). He is best remembered in Burmese history for his steadfast support of King Kale Kye-Taung Nyo during the king's embattled 7-month reign (1425–1426). Though subsequently imprisoned by the next king Mohnyin Thado, Gamani was restored to his prior post at Singu in 1427 after his successful defense of the Ava (Inwa) capital region. The elder brother of Chief Minister Yazathingyan, Baya Gamani served as a senior minister and commander alongside his more famous brother at least until 1443.

== Career ==
=== Loyal vassal of Ava (1401–1425) ===
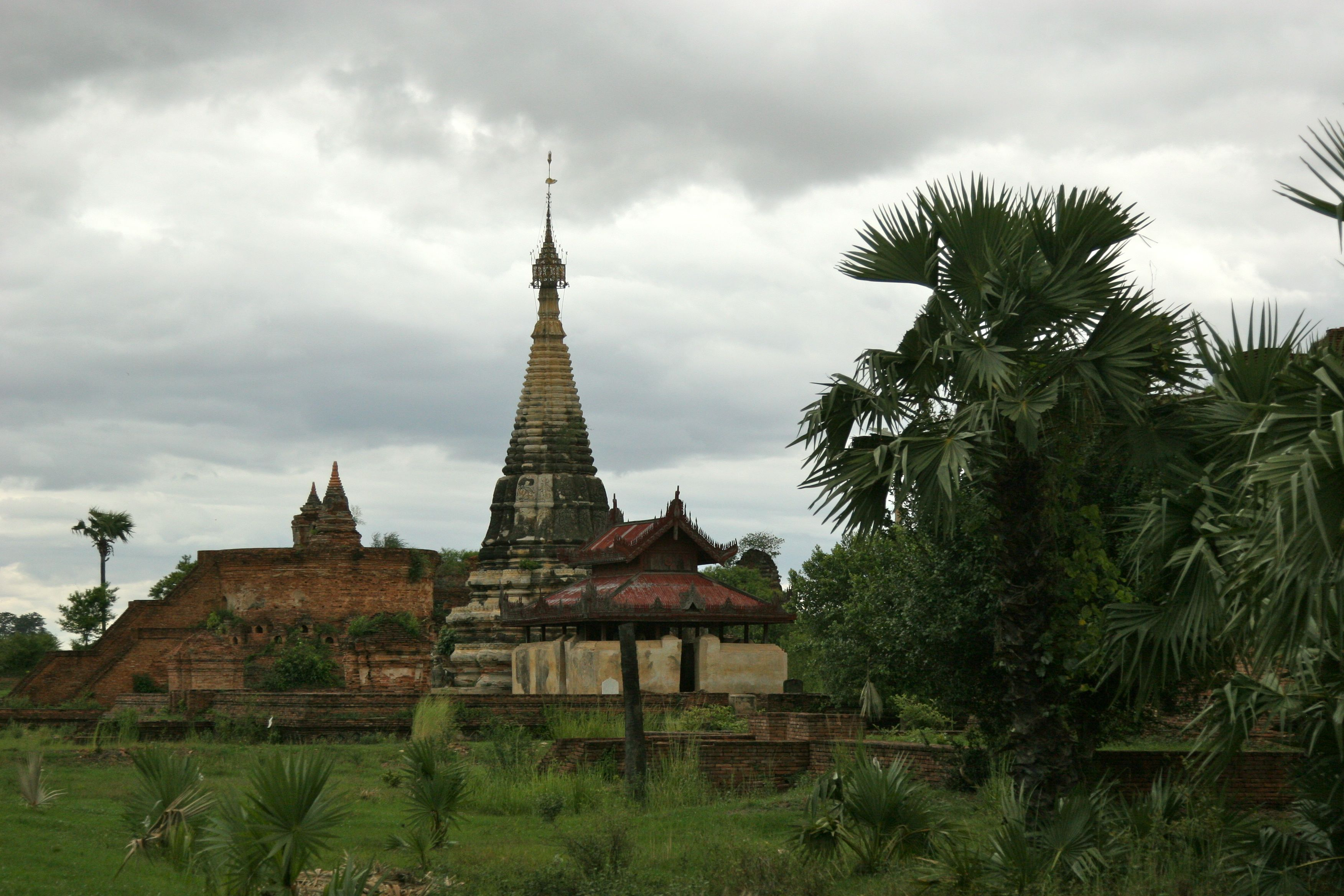
Ruins of Ava (Inwa) today

The first mention of him in the royal chronicles is c. early 1401 (Note: The Maha Yazawin chronicle (1724) (Maha Yazawin Vol. 1 2006: 308) says King Minkhaung appointed Baya Gamani governor of Singu in 764 ME (30 March 1402–29 March 1403), a year after his accession. The Yazawin Thit chronicle (1798) (Yazawin Thit Vol. 1 2012: 212) says Minkhaung made the appointment soon after his accession in 762 ME (29 March 1400–28 March 1401). The Hmannan Yazawin chronicle (1832) (Hmannan Vol. 1 2003: 443) follows the Maha Yazawin's narrative. According to the inscriptional evidence, per (Than Tun 1959: 128), Minkhaung became king on 25 November 1400, which agrees with the Yazawin Thit's accession date of 762 ME (1400/01). This means the appointment probably took place in late 1400 or early 1401.) when King Minkhaung I of Ava appointed one Baya Gamani governor of Singu, a small outpost 100 km north of the capital Ava (Inwa) at the foot of the Shan Hills. The king also appointed Gamani's younger middle brother governor of Siboktara with the title of Yazathingyan. (Note: (Yazawin Thit Vol. 1 2012: 276): They had a much younger brother, who later became a royal army commander with the nickname of "Yan-Lo Kywe" (ရန်လိုကျွဲ; lit. "Belligerent Buffalo") in the mid-1420s.) The brothers were part of the loyalists installed by the new king who was facing several internal and external challenges to his rule. Starting out as cavalry battalion commanders, the duo quickly rose to become regimental commanders, and participated in several military campaigns, most notably in the decades-long war against the southern Hanthawaddy kingdom until 1423.

=== Ava succession crisis (1425–1426) ===
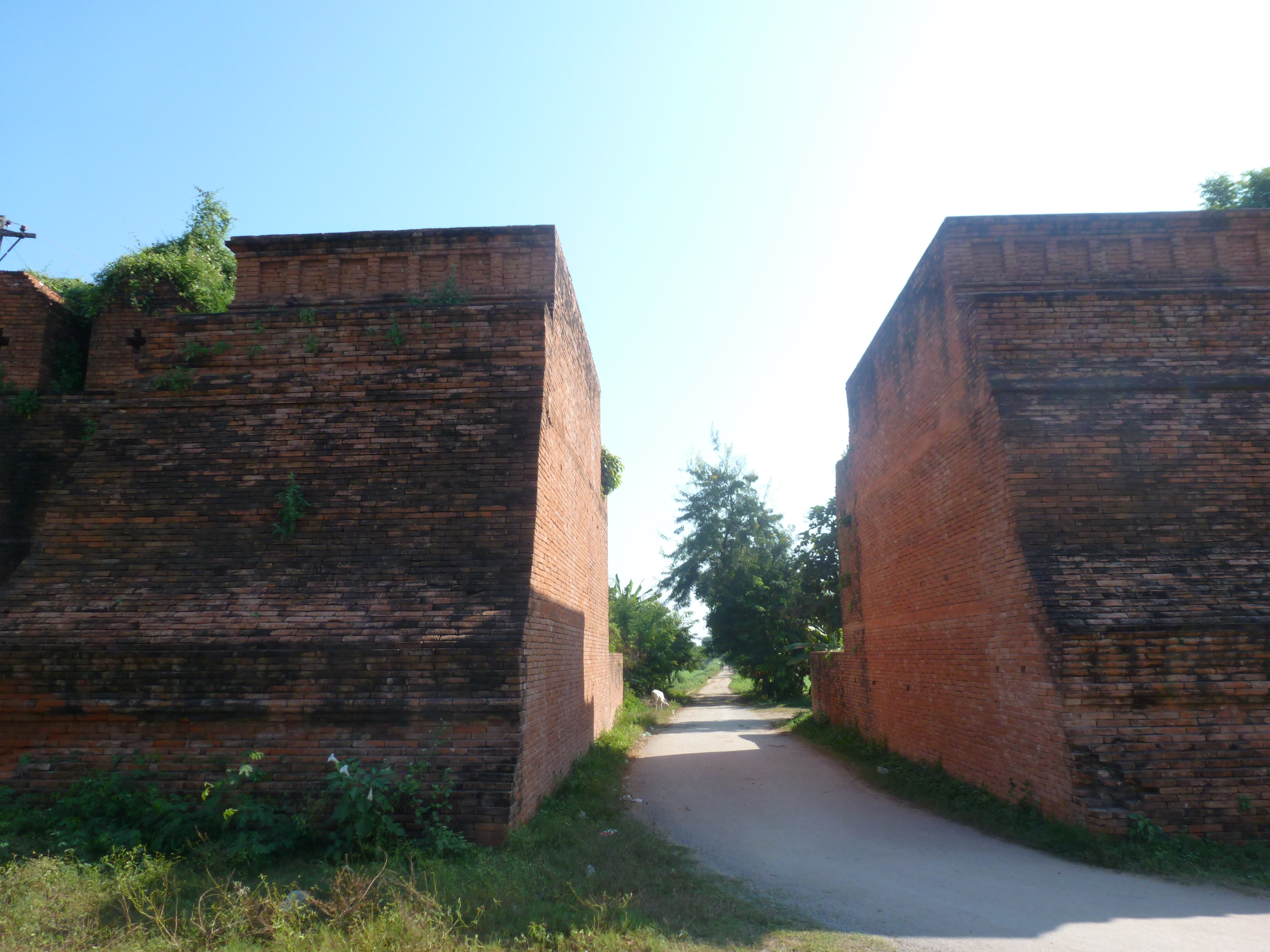
Remains of the outer walls of Ava today

In 1425, the brothers became ensnarled in the succession crisis at the palace. That year, Queen Shin Bo-Me engineered the assassinations of kings Thihathu, and Min Hla within a three-month span, and placed her lover Prince Nyo of Kale on the throne in November. Many vassals viewed the couple's power grab as illegitimate, leading one major vassal ruler, Sawbwa Thado of Mohnyin to formally revolt in February 1426. Gamani, who had previously served under Nyo's command, was one of the few vassals that openly supported the prince. Yazathingyan and their youngest brother, Yan-Lo Kywe, an army commander, also sided with Nyo.

However, Gamani was the only one to stay with Nyo to the end. Even as Thado's forces closed in on Ava in May 1426, and most of the vassals renounced their allegiance to Nyo, Gamani and Yazathingyan continued to lead a severely depleted Ava court. (Note: All the main three chronicles—(Maha Yazawin Vol. 2 2006: 61) (Yazawin Thit Vol. 1 2012: 272), and (Hmannan Vol. 2 2003: 60)—name Baya Gamani and Yazathingyan as the senior ministers of the court, with Gamani's name coming first. However, (Aung-Thwin 2017: 85) considers Yazathingyan to be more senior, "first in line was Yazathingyan, minister to the previous king", while calling Baya Gamani "one of the ministers".) Gamani advised Nyo to leave Ava for Arakan, and return with a larger force. Nyo accepted the recommendation but almost everyone else refused to come along. In the end, c. 15 May 1426, (Note: (Yazawin Thit Vol. 1 2012: 272): Thado entered the Ava palace on Thursday, the 10th waxing of Nayon 788 ME (16 May 1426); this means Nyo and Bo-Me had left at least a day earlier.) under the cover of darkness, only Gamani and his small battalion escorted the usurping couple out of Ava. His two brothers stayed behind and surrendered.

Gamani and the royal couple first ventured south by land along the Irrawaddy before sailing down to Salin. From there, they trekked west. Just a few days later, as they prepared to cross the Arakan Hills at Pe-Lun-Taung, west of present-day Shwesettaw, Nyo suddenly fell ill and died. After Nyo's death, Gamani, ignoring Bo-Me's fierce protests, stopped the journey, and waited to be arrested by the pursuing troops. While she became a queen of Thado, Gamani was put in prison.

=== Brief imprisonment and return to royal service (1426–1427) ===
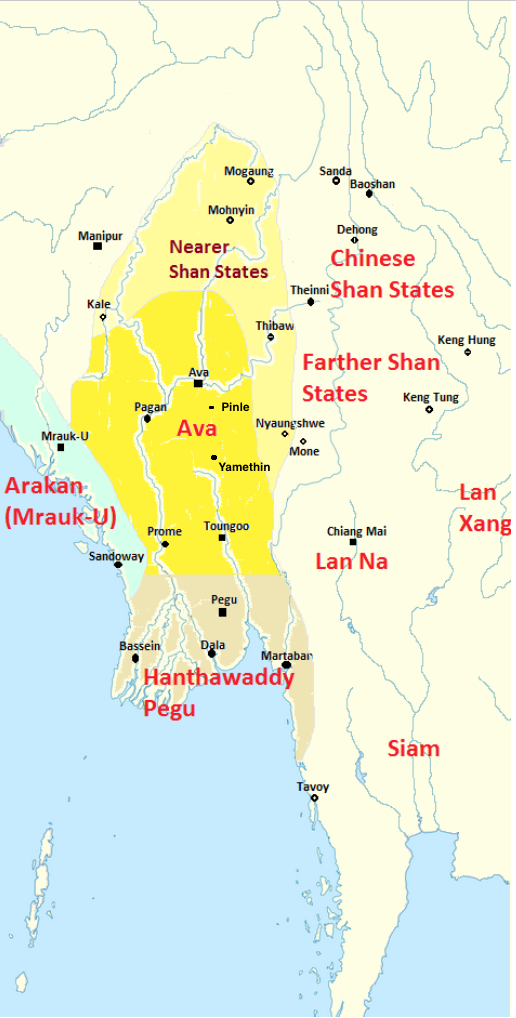
Baya Gamani stopped Minye Kyawhtin's advance at Tabetswe, located between Ava and Pinle.

Yazathingyan, who became the chief minister of the new king, may have kept his older brother alive but could not keep him out of prison. For the next year and a half, Gamani was imprisoned in iron ankle shackles. His opportunity to escape came in late 1427 when an invasion force led by Prince Minye Kyawhtin, a claimant to the Ava throne, rapidly advanced towards Ava. The invasion caught the Ava command completely off guard since they had considered their victory over Kyawhtin's rebel army at Yenantha a year earlier to be decisive. More ominously, Thado did not have enough troops or experienced commanders to defend the capital region as he had just rushed down most of his forces to the south to meet the Hanthawaddy forces that had occupied the southernmost districts of Prome (Pyay). Desperate, the king asked Gamani to take command of a 1000-man regiment to hold the outer perimeter. Gamani agreed, and proved his worth. His regiment defeated Kyawhtin's forces at Tabetswe, 25 km southeast of Ava, and pushed them back to Pinle, about 70 km southeast of Ava.

Although the victory was limited—Kyawhtin would hold on to Pinle until 1445—Thado was grateful. The king not only restored Gamani to the governorship of Singu but also allowed him to collect as much gold from the royal gold vault in one scoop with his two hands each day for seven consecutive days. With the gold, Gamani built a Buddhist pagoda named A-Shay-Pyay Neibban in Tabetswe.

=== Later years (1427–c. 1450s) ===
Baya Gamani became a loyal vassal of King Thado. Though his career was not as distinguished as his brother Yazathingyan who became chief minister under Thado and two successor kings, Gamani twice participated in unsuccessful expeditions to Pinle under the command of the crown prince Minye Kyawswa (1428–1429 and 1433–1434). When Minye Kyawswa became king, he and Yazathingyan co-led the campaign that recaptured the rebellious southeastern vassal states of Taungdwin and Toungoo (Taungoo) in 1441. His last known military service came in 1443 when he was still a minister at the court. As the Chinese forces invaded, King Narapati appointed his eldest son and crown prince Thihathura of Ava, and Baya Gamani as the commanders of the forces to guard the capital while he marched to meet the enemy.

It was the last mention of Gamani in the chronicles. He is not mentioned when King Narapati appointed his son-in-law Min Phyu governor of Sagaing and the ten northern towns, which likely included Singu, in 1450 (or 1460). (Note: Various chronicles report different dates of the Min Phyu appointment; the Hmannan Yazawin chronicle alone gives two dates, a decade a part, in two different sections. (Maha Yazawin Vol. 2 2006: 84) (1724) states that Narapati appointed Min Phyu as governor of Sagaing, and Yazathingyan as governor of Amyint in 822 ME (1460/61). (Yazawin Thit Vol. 1 2012: 290) (1798) corrects the year to 812 ME (1450/51). (Hmannan Vol. 2 2003: 89) (1832) accepts 812 ME and adds that the appointment took place in or soon after Waso 812 ME (June/July 1450). However, a few pages later (Hmannan Vol. 2 2003: 95) retains the Maha Yazawin account that the appointment took place in 822 ME (1460/61). (Aung-Thwin 2017: 97) simply follows the Maha Yazawin's account, and does not mention later chronicles' accounts.) In contrast, chronicles do mention his brother who was also affected by the Min Phyu appointment: the king reappointed Yazathingyan, the previous governor of Sagaing, to Amyint.

== Personal life ==
Baya Gamani is also remembered for his magnanimous treatment of his unfaithful wife. According to the chronicles Yazawin Thit and Hmannan Yazawin, one day Gamani got home from a military expedition earlier than originally planned, and caught his wife and her lover in the bedroom. Furious, he reached for his sword but ultimately decided not to do anything in the heat of the moment. He turned back, and went on to join another military mission. After the second mission, apparently with a cooler head, he not only gave his wife an amicable divorce but also married her with her lover, and gave the couple part of his estate. His self-restraint and magnanimity towards the couple became part of the lore, passed down by successive chroniclers.

== Military service ==
The following is a list of military campaigns in which his name is explicitly mentioned as a commander in the chronicles. Although he likely participated in the other campaigns against Hanthawaddy, and against the Chinese incursions, chronicles do not provide specific commander lists for those campaigns.

Campaign	Duration	Troops commanded	Notes
Ava–Hanthawaddy War (1401–1403)	1401–02	300 cavalry	Co-led (with his brother Yazathingyan) the Ava counterattack near Pagan (Bagan) with the cavalry in 1402. Defended Hlaing, a small stockade near Prome
Conquest of Arakan	1406	1 regiment	Commanded a regiment under the command of Thado and Crown Prince Minye Kyawswa
Ava–Hanthawaddy War (1408–1418)	1408	1 regiment	Commanded one of the four regiments that guarded the capital Ava during Minkhaung's invasion of Hanthawaddy
Ava–Hanthawaddy War (1408–1418) (Hsenwi campaign)	1412	1 regiment	Commanded a regiment in Minye Kyawswa's 7000-strong army in the Hsenwi campaign
Ava–Hanthawaddy War (1422–1423)	1422–23	1 regiment	Commanded a regiment in the second invasion army led by Prince Nyo of Kale
Ava civil wars Mohnyin rebellion	1425–26	1 battalion	Led the battalion that escorted King Nyo and Queen Shin Bo-Me out of Ava and on their way to Arakan
Ava civil wars Battle of Tabetswe	1427–28	1 regiment	Freed from prison, led the Ava force and drove back Minye Kyawhtin's Onbaung forces from Tabetswe
Ava civil wars Battle of Pinle	1428–29	?	Continuation of the Onbaung war. Part of a small force (1500 troops, 300 cavalry, 20 elephants) that attacked Pinle, Prince Minye Kyawhtin's stronghold. Fought against a rival commander atop respective war elephants; killed the enemy commander. But the force could not take the fortified town, and retreated after three months of siege.
Ava civil wars Battles of Pinle, Yamethin and Taungdwin	1433–34	?	Part of a small army (5000 troops, 300 cavalry, 12 elephants) that attacked Taungdwin and Toungoo. Went to the front with his two younger brothers Yazathingyan and Yan-Lo Kywe
Ava civil wars Battles of Taungdwin and Toungoo	1440–41	?	Co-commanded (along with Yazathingyan) units of the main army (7000 troops, 400 cavalry, 20 elephants) that took Taungdwin and Toungoo
Chinese invasions	1443	1 regiment	Guarded the capital along with Crown Prince Thihathura while King Narapati I of Ava went to the Mandalay Hill fort with the main army.

== Bibliography ==
- Aung-Thwin, Michael A. (2017). Myanmar in the Fifteenth Century. Honolulu: University of Hawai'i Press. ISBN 978-0-8248-6783-6.
- Harvey, G.E. (1925). History of Burma: From the Earliest Times to 10 March 1824. London: Frank Cass & Co. Ltd.
- Kala, U (2006) [1724]. Maha Yazawin (in Burmese). Vol. 1–3 (4th printing ed.). Yangon: Ya-Pyei Publishing.
- Maha Sithu (2012) [1798]. Kyaw Win; Thein Hlaing (eds.). Yazawin Thit (in Burmese). Vol. 1–3 (2nd ed.). Yangon: Ya-Pyei Publishing.
- Royal Historical Commission of Burma (2003) [1832]. Hmannan Yazawin (in Burmese). Vol. 1–3. Yangon: Ministry of Information, Myanmar.
- Than Tun (December 1959). "History of Burma: A.D. 1300–1400". Journal of Burma Research Society. XLII (II).

Baya Gamani of Singu Ava Born: c. 1380s Died: ?
Political offices
Preceded by vacant	Governor of Singu c. December 1427 – c. 1450	Succeeded by Min Phyu of Sagaing as Lord of Sagaing and Ten Northern Towns
Preceded by Min Letwe?	Governor of Singu c. 1401 – May 1426	Succeeded by vacant
