= Nawrahta of Salin =

Burmese governor (r. 1390–1426)

Nawrahta of Salin စလင်း နော်ရထာ

Governor of Salin
- Reign: 1390–1426
- Predecessor: ?
- Successor: Minye Kyawswa I of Ava
- Monarch: Swa Saw Ke; Tarabya; Minkhaung I; Thihathu; Min Hla; Min Nyo?
- Born: Pa Kun (Bya Kun) c. early 1370s Myaungmya; Hanthawaddy Kingdom
- Died: Unknown ? Ava Kingdom
- Issue: Myat Hla
- House: Hanthawaddy
- Father: Laukpya
- Mother: Tala Mi Pale
- Religion: Theravada Buddhism

Nawrahta of Salin (Burmese: စလင်း နော်ရထာ, pronounced [səlɪ́ɴ nɔ̀jətʰà]; also known as Bya Kun) was governor of Salin from 1390 to 1426. A member of the Hanthawaddy royal family, he fled his native Myaungmya in 1390 after his father Laukpya was defeated by King Razadarit of Hanthawaddy. After finding refuge in the northern Ava Kingdom, Nawrahta became a key military commander in the Ava military, and fought against Hanthawaddy in the Forty Years' War. He also served as a minister at the Ava court from 1408 to 1425. After the 1425–1426 succession crisis at Ava, he submitted, albeit belatedly, to the new king Thado. He apparently lost all his positions as he is not mentioned in the royal chronicles again.

== Early life ==
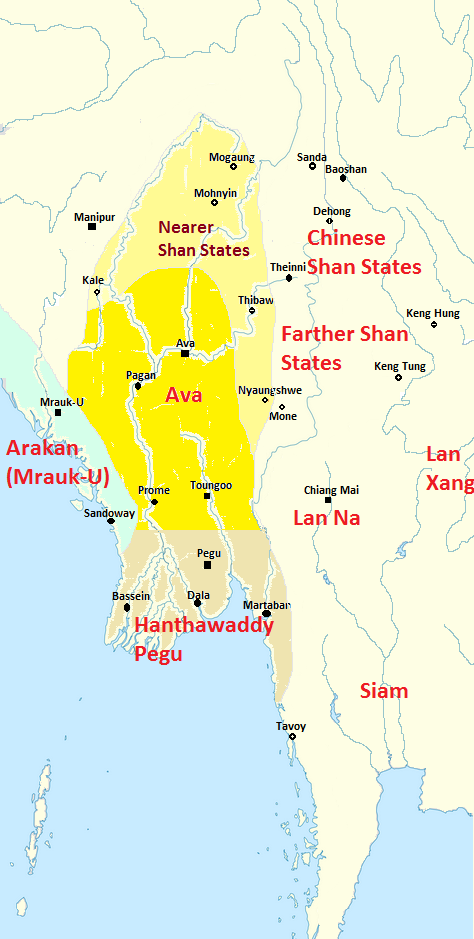
Political map of Myanmar c. 1450. The map in the first half of the century was similar except in Arakan which was disorganized until 1429. The nearer Shan states in light yellow, including Mohnyin, Mogaung, Thibaw (Hsipaw/Onbaung) and Nyaungshwe (Yawnghwe), were sometime tributaries of Ava during the first half of the 15th century.

The future governor was born to a large powerful noble family in the Mon-speaking Martaban–Hanthawaddy Kingdom—probably in the early 1370s. (Note: Per (Maha Yazawin Vol. 2 2006: 51) and (Yazawin Thit Vol. 1 2012: 261), as Razadarit called Nawrahta "Nga Pyin Nge" (Nga Pyin [Nawrahta] the young), Kun was apparently younger than Razadarit (born 1368). However, as Kun was fighting a war in 1390, he was probably born in the early 1370s at the latest.) He was the youngest of the three children of Viceroy Laukpya of Myaungmya and Tala Mi Pale, one of Laukpya's many wives. In all, he was one of Laukpya's 70 or so children. (Note: (Pan Hla 2005: 49–51, 51 footnote 1): The Razadarit Ayedawbon says Laukpya had a total of 70 children (22 daughters and 48 sons) by 16 child-bearing wives but its detailed listing of the children yields only 68 children (16 daughters and 52 sons). Of the named 52 sons, there was only one son with the name Kun, whose mother was Tala Mi Pale.) His personal name was Ma Pa Kun (Mon: မပါကောန်; Burmese: မပါကွန်); he was also known more formally as Bya Kun (Burmese: ဗြကွန်, "Lord Kun").

Kun was a half cousin, twice-removed of the then reigning king Binnya U. (Note: (Pan Hla 2005: 40): Laukpya's father [Kun's paternal grandfather] Saw E Pyathat was a son of Smin E Kan-Kaung, a half-brother of King Saw Zein (r. 1323–1330). It means Saw E Pyathat and Binnya U were half cousins of the same generation, and Laukpya was King Binnya U's half-cousin, once removed.) He belonged to the branch of the royal family that held effective power in two out of the three provinces of the kingdom. His father Laukpya and his elder paternal uncle Byattaba of Martaban (Mottama) raised a rebellion between 1364 and 1371, and reached an agreement with the king in Pegu that recognized their de facto independent rule of their respective provinces in 1371. When Binnya U died in 1384, the two brothers refused to submit to Binnya U's son and successor King Razadarit. In 1385, Laukpya subsequently invited the northern Burmese-speaking kingdom of Ava to invade Hanthawaddy, starting what would become the Forty Years' War between Ava and Pegu.

The ensuing war would drive out Kun from his native land. Razadarit not only survived Ava's first two invasions (1385–1387) but also went on to capture the rebellious provinces by 1390. Kun and his brother in law Bya Kyin were the only two prominent members of Laukpya's extended family that managed to escape. At Ava, King Swa Saw Ke welcomed Kun and Kyin, and immediately gave them important fiefs: Kyin was made governor of Prome (Pyay) with the title of Letya Pyanchi, and Kun was given Salin with the title of Nawrahta.

== Governor of Salin ==
Nawrahta would spend the rest of his life in the northern kingdom. He and Letya Pyanchi immediately became commanders in the Ava military. The duo went to the front against Razadarit's forces in the following 1390–1391 campaign. The duo were key commanders in Ava's wars in the first decades of the 1400s, including the 1406 Arakan campaign and the resumed campaigns against Hanthawaddy from 1408 onwards. After Pyanchi fell in action in 1413, Nawrahta became the lone former Hanthawaddy royal on the Ava side.

By then he had also become a key member of the court, which he joined in 1408. (Note: (Maha Yazawin Vol. 1 2006: 336) and (Hmannan Vol. 1 2003: 479): Nawrahta was one of the ten amats (ministers) that negotiated a ceasefire with Pegu in 1408. The 10-member delegation was led by Chief Minister Min Yaza; other members were: 2. Thihapate III of Taungdwin, 3. Thray Sithu of Myinsaing, 4. Tarabya I of Pakhan, 5. Uzana of Pagan, 6. Baya Thingyan [sic] (Nanda Thingyan of Pyinzi?), 7. Nawrahta of Salin, 8. Yazathingyan of Amyint, 9. Min Nyo of Kale, 10. Thado of Mohnyin.) His relationship with the reigning Ava royalty was cemented in 1413 when his son Myat Hla became a page of Crown Prince Minye Kyawswa. Indeed, he was one of the few in the Ava high command that questioned Minye Kyawswa's decision to engage Hanthawaddy forces in Dala–Twante in 1415. He and Tuyin Theinzi were the only ones that supported Yazathingyan's recommendation not to engage. (The crown prince famously discarded the advice but subsequently fell in action.)

The former Hanthawaddy royal remained loyal to Ava even when the Hanthawaddy command tried to get him to switch sides. The attempt came soon after Minye Kyawswa's death at Dala, and Nawrahta and Prince Min Nyo of Kale became acting chief commanders of the Ava forces in the theater. The Hanthawaddy delegation brought a letter by King Razadarit himself, which addressed Nawrahta as "My dear nephew, Lord of Salin", (or "My dear son, Lord of Salin") (Note: The chronicle Maha Yazawin (Maha Yazawin Vol. 2 2006: 50) says "My dear son, Lord of Salin". The Yazawin Thit (Yazawin Thit Vol. 1 2012: 261) changes it "My dear nephew, Lord of Salin" but Hmannan Yazawin (Hmannan Vol. 2 2003: 45) keeps Maha Yazawin's language.) and promised him the governorship of Myaungmya, his father's old fief. But Nawrahta flatly rejected the overture, saying his loyalties now laid with Ava.

Nawrahta remained a member of the Ava high command to the mid 1420s. He planned the 1417–1418 campaign to the south, and served as the military governor of Bassein (Pathein) during Ava's brief occupation of the delta in 1422–1423. When a succession crisis arose after kings Thihathu and Min Hla were assassinated within three months in 1425, he stayed out of the subsequent civil war between the usurper King Nyo of Kale and Gov. Thado of Mohnyin.

His non-interference may have cost him his job at Salin. After Thado drove Nyo out of Ava in May 1426, the new king made his eldest son einshei min (အိမ်ရှေ့မင်း, lit. "Lord of the Front Place", heir apparent) with the title of Minye Kyawswa, and gave the new crown prince Salin, Sagu, and Legaing districts (all three in modern Minbu District) in fief. Thado made the announcement even though he did not yet control any of the districts. By August however Nawrahta along with the lords of the nearby states of Pagan (Bagan), Sale, Sagu, Pakhan Nge, and Prome (Pyay) all submitted to Thado as they all went to the front as part of Thado's 9000-strong army to Pakhan where Prince Minye Kyawhtin was holding out. Despite his participation, Nawrahta likely lost his office at Salin as well as his minister position at the Ava court since he is not mentioned in the chronicles again. The next mention in the chronicles about an appointment at Salin was in 1446 when King Narapati I of Ava appointed another Hanthawaddy royal Binnya Kyan to the post.

== Military service ==
The following is a list of military campaigns in which Nawrahta of Salin is explicitly mentioned as a commander in the royal chronicles.

Campaign	Duration	Troops commanded	Notes
Ava–Hanthawaddy War (1385–1391)	1389−90	?	Co-deputy commander of Bassein
Ava–Hanthawaddy War (1385–1391)	1390−91	1 regiment (1000 troops)	Part of the 17,000-strong river-borne invasion force that attacked Gu-Htut.
Ava–Hanthawaddy War (1401–1403)	1402	?	Led Ava's relief forces that defeated the Hanthawaddy army at Khaunglaunggya outside Prome, ending the siege
Arakan	1406	1 regiment	Part of the invasion force led by Crown Prince Minye Kyawswa
Ava–Hanthawaddy War (1408–1418)	1408	1 regiment	Part of the disastrous invasion that began at the outset of the rainy season. Also commanded a regiment in the rearguard army in the retreat about four months after.
Ava–Hanthawaddy War (1408–1418)	1414–15	?	Part of the battle that captured the famed Hanthawaddy commander Smin Bayan in 1414. Co-commanded with Min Nyo of Kale the army in rearguard action after Minye Kyawswa fell in the battle of Dala in 1415.
Ava–Hanthawaddy War (1408–1418)	1417–18	unknown	Mastermind of the two-pronged campaign that involved an army (7000 troops, 700 cavalry, 40 elephants) and a riverine force (9000 troops).
Ava–Hanthawaddy War (1422–1423)	1422–23	unknown	Served as the military governor of Bassein (Pathein) during Ava's brief occupation of the Irrawaddy delta.
Battle of Pakhan	1426	unknown	Part of the 4000-strong division led by King Mohnyin Thado, which in turn was part of a 9000-strong Ava army. Served alongside the lords of Pagan, Sale, Sagu, Pakhan Nge, and Prome.

== Bibliography ==
- Aung-Thwin, Michael A. (2017). Myanmar in the Fifteenth Century. Honolulu: University of Hawai'i Press. ISBN 978-0-8248-6783-6.
- Fernquest, Jon (Spring 2006). "Rajadhirat's Mask of Command: Military Leadership in Burma (c. 1384–1421)" (PDF). SBBR. 4 (1). Archived from the original on 19 February 2009.
- Harvey, G. E. (1925). History of Burma: From the Earliest Times to 10 March 1824. London: Frank Cass & Co. Ltd.
- Kala, U (2006) [1724]. Maha Yazawin (in Burmese). Vol. 1–3 (4th printing ed.). Yangon: Ya-Pyei Publishing.
- Maha Sithu (2012) [1798]. Myint Swe; Kyaw Win; Thein Hlaing (eds.). Yazawin Thit (in Burmese). Vol. 1–3 (2nd printing ed.). Yangon: Ya-Pyei Publishing.
- Pan Hla, Nai (2005) [1968]. Razadarit Ayedawbon (in Burmese) (8th printing ed.). Yangon: Armanthit Sarpay.
- Royal Historical Commission of Burma (2003) [1832]. Hmannan Yazawin (in Burmese). Vol. 1–3. Yangon: Ministry of Information, Myanmar.
- Sandamala Linkara, Ashin (1997–1999) [1931]. Rakhine Razawin Thit (in Burmese). Vol. 1–2. Yangon: Tetlan Sarpay.

Nawrahta of Salin Ava Kingdom Born: c. early 1370s Died: ?
Royal titles
Preceded by ?	Governor of Salin; 1390–1426	Succeeded by Minye Kyawswa I of Ava
