= Saw Min Hla =

Saw Min Hla စောမင်းလှ

Chief queen consort of Ava
- Tenure: c. October 1421 – August 1425
- Predecessor: Shin Saw
- Successor: Shin Bo-Me

Queen Mother of Ava
- Tenure: c. August 1425 –c. November 1425
- Born: 1390s Ava Kingdom
- Died: Ava (Inwa); Ava Kingdom
- Spouse: Minye Kyawswa (1406–1415); Thihathu (1416–1425)
- Issue: Minye Kyawhtin; Min Hla Htut; Minye Aung Naing; Saw Min Phyu; Min Hla; Saw Pyei Chantha; Shwe Pyi Shin Me
- Father: Tarabya I of Pakhan
- Religion: Theravada Buddhism

Saw Min Hla (Burmese: စောမင်းလှ, pronounced [sɔ́ mɪ́ɴ l̥a̰]) was the chief queen consort of Ava from 1421 to 1425. Her son Min Hla briefly became king for three months in 1425, following the death of her second husband, King Thihathu of Ava. Her first husband was Thihathu's elder brother, Crown Prince Minye Kyawswa of the Forty Years' War fame. Her eldest child Minye Kyawhtin was the rebel king of Toungoo (Taungoo) from 1452 to 1459.

== Brief ==
Saw Min Hla was a daughter of Tarabya I of Pakhan, and sister of Tarabya of Toungoo, who was viceroy of Toungoo from 1440 to 1446. In 1406, she was married to Prince Minye Kyawswa at his coronation ceremony as heir-apparent. (Note: The Maha Yazawin chronicle (Maha Yazawin Vol. 2 2006: 33–34) says that she was married to Minye Kyawswa in 775 ME (29 March 1413 to 28 March 1414), and that she was first married to Letya Pyanchi and then to Sokkate, both viceroys of Prome. But the Yazawin Thit chronicle corrects Maha Yazawin and says that it was a different Saw Min Hla, and that Saw Min Hla of Pakhan was married to Minye Kyawswa in 768 ME (30 March 1406 to 29 March 1407) at his coronation ceremony as crown prince. The Hmannan Yazawin chronicle (Hmannan Vol. 2003: 20–21) follows Yazawin Thit's account, citing other evidence.) Minye Kyawswa was a cousin. (Note: According to the Toungoo Yazawin chronicle (Sein Lwin Lay 2006: 33), she was a niece of King Minkhaung I, which makes her a first cousin of Minye Kyawswa. But the standard chronicles do not mention any relations between her and Minye Kyawswa.) She and Minye Kyawswa had four children between 1408 and 1415: (Note: (Hmannan Vol. 2 2003: 21): The first child Minye Kyawhtin was born in 770 ME (29 March 1408 to 28 March 1409). (Hmannan Vol. 2 2003: 54): the youngest child was born in 776 ME (30 March 1416 to 29 March 1417).) Minye Kyawhtin, Min Hla Htut, Minye Aung Naing and Saw Min Phyu. A year after Minye Kyawswa fell in action, she was made the chief consort of Minye Thihathu, Minye Kyawswa's younger brother and successor as heir-apparent. She had three children with Thihathu: Min Hla, Saw Pyei Chantha and Shwe Pyi Shin Me. In all, she had seven children (three sons and four daughters).

When Thihathu became king in 1421, Saw Min Hla became the chief queen. But her rank as the chief queen was only nominal. Thihathu also took his father's favorite queen Shin Bo-Me as queen. He spent much time with Bo-Me that Saw Min Hla left the palace for a hall next to the Shwe Zedi Pagoda in the capital, and retired to religion. She hence became known as Tanzaung-shin Mibaya တန်ဆောင်းရှင် မိဖုရား).

Her fifth child, Min Hla, became king in August 1425 after Thihathu was assassinated in a plot arranged by Shin Bo-Me. Three months later, the eight-year-old king was poisoned by Shin Bo-Me, who put her lover, Prince Min Nyo of Kale, on the throne. Saw Min Hla's eldest child, Minye Kyawhtin (also known as Min-nge Kyawhtin), became the rebel king of Toungoo from 1452 to 1459.

== Bibliography ==
- Harvey, G. E. (1925). History of Burma: From the Earliest Times to 10 March 1824. London: Frank Cass & Co. Ltd.
- Kala, U (2006) [1724]. Maha Yazawin (in Burmese). Vol. 1–3 (4th printing ed.). Yangon: Ya-Pyei Publishing.
- Royal Historical Commission of Burma (2003) [1832]. Hmannan Yazawin (in Burmese). Vol. 1–3. Yangon: Ministry of Information, Myanmar.
- Sandamala Linkara, Ashin (1997–1999) [1931]. Rakhine Yazawinthit Kyan (in Burmese). Vol. 1–2. Yangon: Tetlan Sarpay.
- Sein Lwin Lay, Kahtika U (2006) [1968]. Mintaya Shwe Hti and Bayinnaung: Ketumadi Taungoo Yazawin (in Burmese) (2nd printing ed.). Yangon: Yan Aung Sarpay.

Saw Min Hla Ava Dynasty Born: 1390s
Royal titles
Preceded by Shin Saw	Chief queen consort of Ava c. October 1421 – August 1425	Succeeded by Shin Bo-Me
