= Saw Pyei Chantha (disambiguation) =

Saw Pyei Chantha was a Burmese royal title. It may refer to:

- Saw Pyei Chantha: Queen consort of Arakan (r. 1408), Queen consort of Hanthawaddy (r. 1408–1421)
- Saw Pyei Chantha of Taungdwin: Duchess of Taungdwin (r. 1441–1470s); Duchess of Toungoo (r. 1459–1466)
