= Kale Kye-Taung Nyo =

King of Ava (Burma), r. 1425–1426

Kale Kye-Taung Nyo ကလေး ကျေးတောင် ညို

King of Ava
- Reign: by 9 November 1425 – 16 May 1426
- Predecessor: Min Hla
- Successor: Mohnyin Thado
- Chief Ministers: Baya Gamani and Yazathingyan (Note: All the main three chronicles—(Maha Yazawin Vol. 2 2006: 61) (Yazawin Thit Vol. 1 2012: 272), and (Hmannan Vol. 2 2003: 60)—name Baya Gamani and Yazathingyan as the senior ministers of the court, with Gamani's name coming first. However, (Aung-Thwin 2017: 85) considers Yazathingyan to be more senior, "first in line was Yazathingyan, minister to the previous king", while calling Baya Gamani "one of the ministers".)

Governor of Kale (Kalay)
- Reign: c. December 1406 – November 1425
- Predecessor: Anawrahta (acting)
- Successor: Shan Say-Hu
- Monarch: Minkhaung I (1406–1421); Thihathu (1421–1425); Min Hla (1425)
- Born: c. 10 October 1385; Tuesday, c. 7th waxing of Tazaungmon 747 ME; Ava (Inwa); Ava Kingdom
- Died: c. late May 1426 (aged 40) c. late Nayon 788 ME; Pe-Lun Taung, Shwesettaw; Ava Kingdom
- Spouses: Saw Nant-tha (1400s–?); Shin Bo-Me (1425–1426)
- House: Pinya
- Father: Tarabya
- Mother: Min Hla Myat
- Religion: Theravada Buddhism

Kale Kye-Taung Nyo (Burmese: ကလေး ကျေးတောင် ညို, [kəlé tɕédàʊɰ̃ɲò]; also spelled Kale Kyetaungnyo or Kalekyetaungnyo; (Note: The name ကလေး ကျေးတောင် ညို literally means Nyo of Kale Kye-Taung. (Harvey 1925: 96) transliterates the name as Kalekyetaungnyo, and (Aung-Thwin 2017: 82–83) as Kale Kye Taung Nyo.) 1385–1426) Tai name Hso Kyaing Hpa (သိူဝ်ၸႅင်ႈၾႃႉ) was king of Ava from 1425 to 1426, and governor of Kale Kye-Taung (Kalay) from 1406 to 1425. A top military commander during the reigns of kings Minkhaung I and Thihathu of Ava, Prince Min Nyo came to power in 1425 by overthrowing his eight-year-old nephew King Min Hla with the help of his lover Queen Shin Bo-Me. But Nyo himself was overthrown less than seven months later in 1426 by his fellow senior commander and long-time rival Gov. Thado of Mohnyin.

The eldest son of King Tarabya of Ava, Prince Nyo was the heir presumptive during his father's brief reign in 1400. He did not succeed to the throne but became a son-in-law of the successor, his half-uncle King Minkhaung I (r. 1400–1421), who in 1406 sent him to govern Kale, a remote Shan state in the northwest. The prince proved a loyal and able vassal, keeping the frontier region quiet while leading several campaigns in Ava's long running war against Hanthawaddy Pegu between 1408 and 1423. Nyo and Thado rose to be the deputy commanders-in-chief in 1412, and after the death of Crown Prince Minye Kyawswa in 1415, the duo became the leading commanders of the Ava military.

Nyo was initially loyal to Minkhaung's successor King Thihathu (r. 1421–1425). After having led the successful 1422–1423 campaign against Pegu, he quietly turned against his half-cousin the king, who spent much of his time away from the palace. The prince became involved with Bo-Me, a disenchanted queen of Thihathu, and the couple managed to have Thihathu assassinated in 1425. Three months later, Bo-Me's faction assassinated Thihathu's successor Min Hla, and placed Nyo on the throne.

The new king never had firm control beyond the Ava (Inwa) capital region. He received only tepid support from the vassals in the south, and almost no support in the north where his rival Thado was based. After losing the subsequent brief civil war, Nyo and Bo-Me fled the capital in 1426, and he died on the run a few days later. Like his father, Nyo reigned less than seven months. He is sometimes referred to as the last king of the founding dynasty of Ava.

== Early life ==
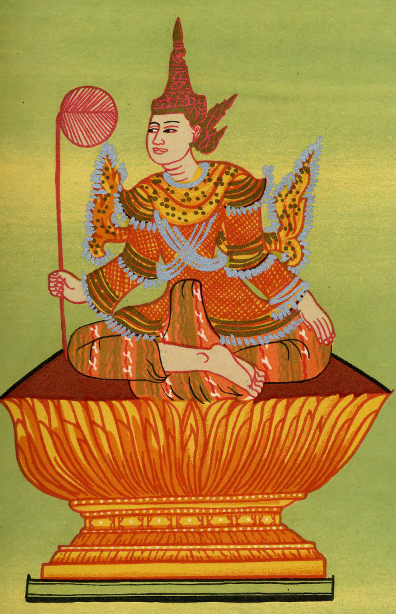
Nyo's father King Hsinbyushin Tarabya portrayed as Mintara nat

Min Nyo was born to Princess Min Hla Myat and Crown Prince Hsinbyushin c. 10 October 1385. (Note: (Zata 1960: 75): King Kale was born on Tuesday, 5th nekkhat of the 9th month of 757 ME. But 757 is most probably a typo as all other main chronicles say he was born c. 1385 (747 ME). Tuesday, 5th nekkhat of the 9th month of 747 ME is c. 7th waxing of Tazaungmon 747 ME (10 October 1385).) He was the first child of the couple, who were first cousins, and the eldest grandchild of the reigning king of Ava, Swa Saw Ke (r. 1367–1400). Nyo had at least one younger sister Min Hla Htut. (Note: (Yazawin Thit Vol. 1 2012: 208) cites an inscription to note that King Tarabya had a son and two daughters, including the middle daughter named Min Phyu. However, (Hmannan Vol. 1 2003: 437–438) rejects the inscription's narrative, and stays with (Maha Yazawin 2006: 305)'s narrative that Tarabya had two issue: Min Nyo and Min Hla Htut.) He grew up at the palace in Ava (Inwa) where his father was groomed to be the next king by his grandfather. At 15, Nyo became the heir presumptive in 1400 when his father became king with the title of Tarabya.

But just seven months later, King Tarabya was assassinated by Gov. Thihapate of Tagaung. Despite being the eldest and only son, Nyo was not a factor in the ensuing power struggle. The main contender for the throne was Nyo's maternal granduncle Gov. Maha Pyauk of Yamethin, who commanded a 10,000-strong army. The court led by Chief Minister Min Yaza, which had already executed Thihapate, did not consider Nyo ready to face Maha Pyauk; instead they nominated Nyo's half-uncle Prince Min Swe of Pyinzi. Indeed, Swe himself was reluctant to take on Maha Pyauk. It was only through the efforts of Prince Theiddat, Swe's younger brother, who managed to assassinate Maha Pyauk that Swe gained power. Swe ascended the throne with the title of Minkhaung on 25 November 1400.

== Minkhaung years (1400–1421) ==
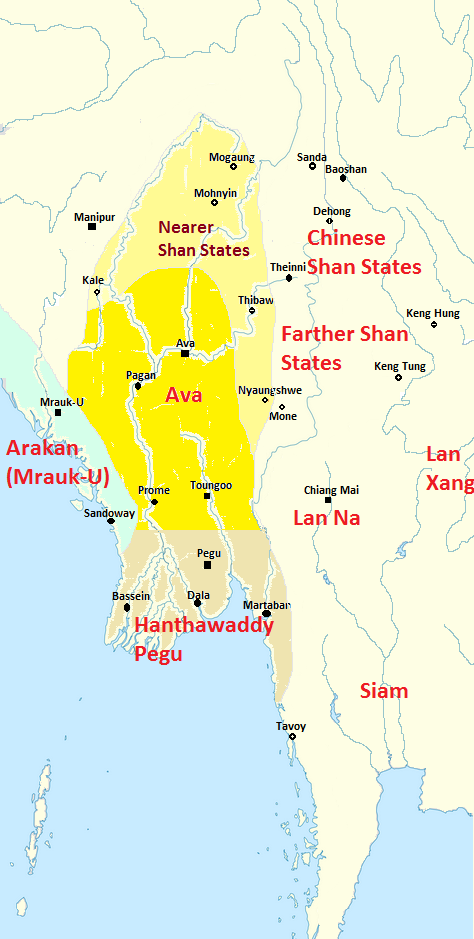
Political map of Myanmar c. 1450. The map in the 1420s was similar except in Arakan which was disorganized until 1429. The nearer Shan states in light yellow were tributaries of Ava. Nyo's fief in Kale (Kalay) was located at the westernmost edge of the Ava-controlled Shan states while his ally Le Than Bwa was sawbwa of Onbaung, present-day Thibaw (Hsipaw).

Nyo readily submitted to the new king. For his part, Minkhaung did not deem his "soft-spoken" half-nephew as a threat, and did not purge him. Over the next few years, the young prince developed into what Minkhaung and Min Yaza called "intelligent and able" leader and commander. Minkhaung married Nyo to his daughter Saw Nant-tha, by one of his junior queens. In 1406, Minkhaung, who was planning to announce his eldest son Minye Kyawswa as his heir apparent, considered Nyo for the governorship at one of the northern border Shan states, in consultation with Chief Minister Min Yaza. The vassal states under consideration were Mohnyin and its 19 districts (maings); Onbaung and its 30 districts; Maw and its 47 districts; and Kale (Kalay) and its nine districts. Ultimately, following Yaza's advice, the king decided on Kale. Minkhaung moved Gov. Anawrahta of Kale to become "king" of the newly conquered Arakan, and sent Nyo to take over Kale, located at the edge of the Chin Hills about 360 kilometres (220 mi) northwest of Ava. (Note: The main chronicles (Maha Yazawin Vol. 1 2006: 310, 330) (Yazawin Thit Vol. 1 2012: 224–225) say Nyo succeeded Anawrahta at Kalay. But Zatadawbon Yazawin (Zata 1960: 90) and Mani Yadanabon (Yazawin Thit Vol. 1 2012: 225, footnote 3, citing Mani) say Nyo succeeded Min Chay-To.)

Nyo took what was probably a hardship assignment in stride. Unlike Theiddat, he did not protest Minkhaung's subsequent appointment of Minye Kyawswa as heir apparent. (A bitter Theiddat defected to Pegu in 1407.) Instead, Nyo invested in governing the Shan-speaking frontier state. Although he was immediately greeted with a rebellion by a local chief, the new sawbwa was able to bring the rebel chief into the fold just by using diplomacy. The Ava court was impressed. Indeed, the Ava-born prince became so attuned to the local issues that the Ava court began referring to him as "Kye-Taung" Nyo (Nyo of Kye-Taung, another name of Kale).

Nyo proved an able and loyal vassal. When the Forty Years' War between Ava and Pegu flared up again in 1408, Nyo went to the front, first serving under King Minkhaung, and then under Crown Prince Minye Kyawswa. By the Hsenwi campaign of 1412, Nyo and Gov. Thado of Mohnyin had emerged as the main deputies of Minye Kyawswa, the commander-in-chief. As recounted in the chronicles, Nyo and Thado made their name by personally leading the charge on their war elephants and driving back the enemy into the walled city of Hsenwi. Indeed, Nyo was by Minye Kyawswa's side in the battle of Dala against Pegu on 13 March 1415 but he could not keep up with the crown prince, who was mortally wounded deep behind the enemy lines. After Minye Kyawswa's death, Nyo and Gov. Nawrahta of Salin briefly became interim co-commanders-in-chief of the Ava forces.

But the leadership soon passed to Minkhaung's middle son Minye Thihathu, who was about nine years younger and had far less military experience than Nyo. Nonetheless, Nyo served under Thihathu with distinction. In the 1417–1418 campaign, it was Nyo's army that captured the heavily stockaded Fort Hmawbi, prompting King Razadarit at Pegu (Bago) to evacuate to Martaban (Mottama). Only the arrival of the rainy season of 1418 stopped the advance to Pegu. It was the last campaign during Minkhaung's and Razadarit's reigns, both of which ended within two months of each other in late 1421.

== Thihathu years (1421–1425) ==
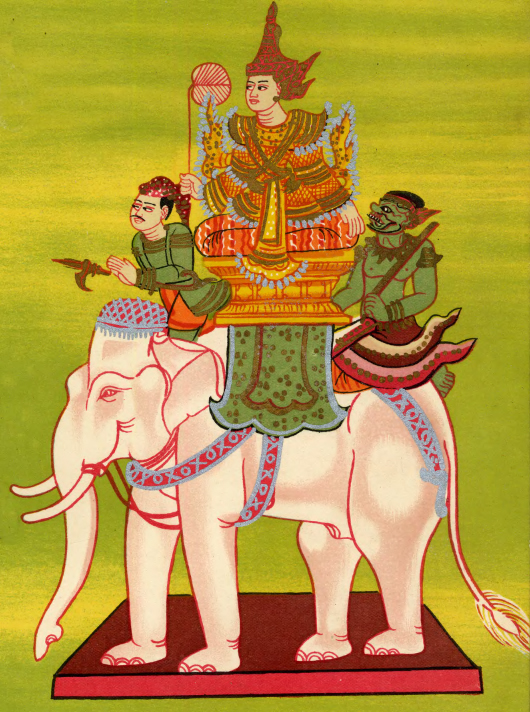
Thihathu portrayed as the Aung Pinle Hsinbyushin nat

When Thihathu succeeded to the throne in 1421, Nyo readily pledged allegiance to his half-cousin. The new king had sufficient trust in Nyo that he appointed Nyo as one of the two overall commanders of the 1422–1423 campaign against Pegu. Nyo commanded the naval invasion force (6000 troops, 700 war boats, 200 cargo boats) while his counterpart Thado invaded with an 8000-strong army (including 500 cavalry and 30 war elephants). The campaign was a success. The Ava forces captured the entire Irrawaddy delta, and forced Prince Binnya Ran, the main pretender to the Pegu throne, to propose a peace treaty with terms favorable to Ava, including a marriage alliance between Thihathu and Princess Shin Saw Pu, Ran's sister. Thihathu accepted the proposal, and came to the south to sign the treaty in early 1423.

The treaty marked a key turning point. Back in Ava, Thihathu is said to have spent most of his time with Queen Shin Saw Pu and concubines away from the palace. According to the chronicles, it was the king's unending affection for Shin Saw Pu that drew the ire of the powerful queen Shin Bo-Me. Said to be a dashing beauty in her own right, Bo-Me plotted to overthrow the king, and by 1425 had found a willing partner in Nyo. Gov. Le Than Bwa of Onbaung (modern Thibaw) also joined their cause. In August 1425, based on the time and location provided to them by Bo-Me, Le Than Bwa and his men assassinated the king at his country estate in Aung Pinle.

However, despite Bo-Me's intense lobbying for Nyo, the court instead chose Thihathu's eight-year-old eldest son Min Hla as king. Bo-Me did not give up. About three months later, the powerful queen managed to assassinate the boy king. Her faction at the court this time successfully rallied around Nyo.

== Reign (1425–1426) ==
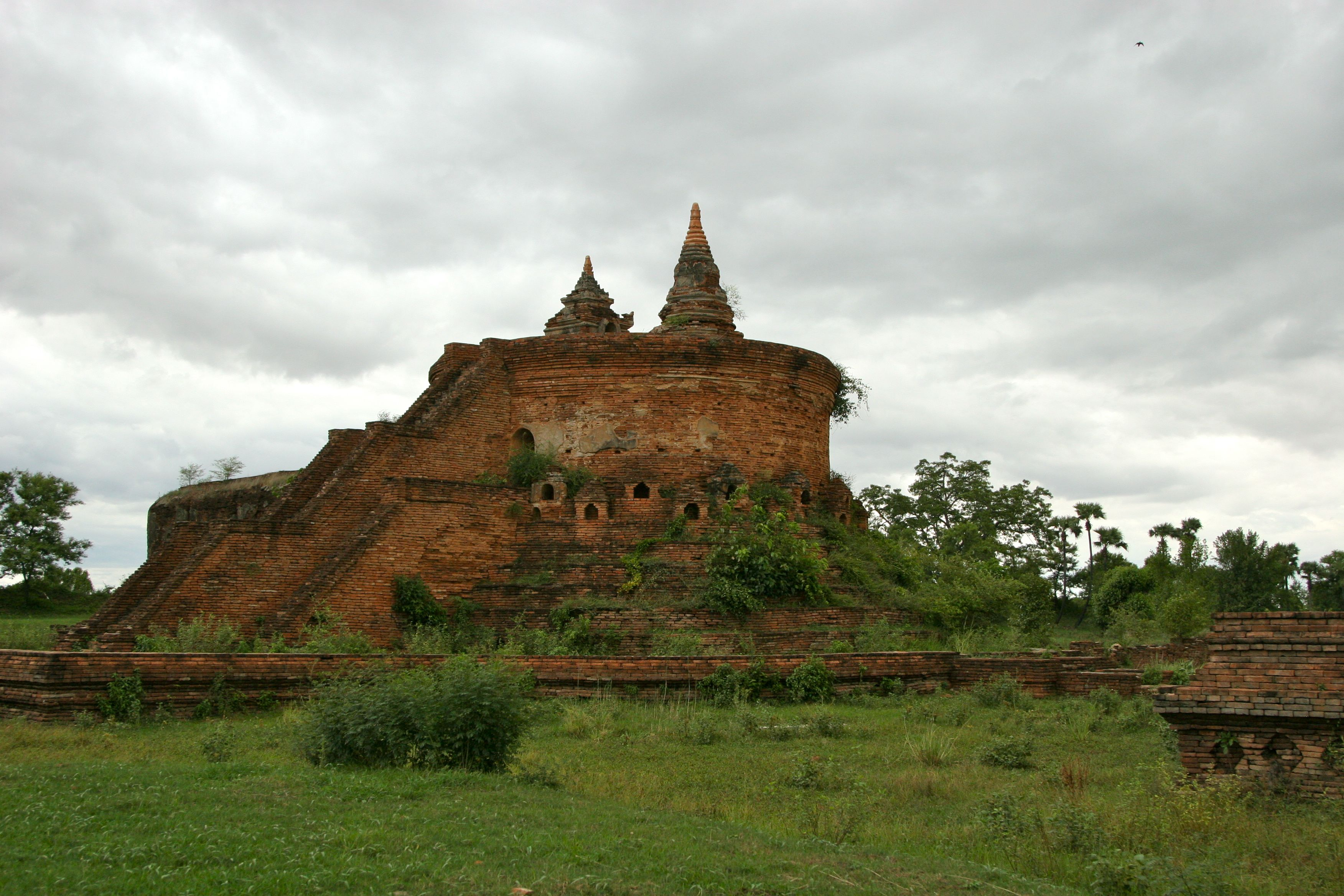
Stupa ruins at Ava today

=== Weak support base ===
Nyo ascended the throne with Shin Bo-Me as his chief queen by his side in November 1425. He immediately tried to garner support from his vassals, by giving and promising lavish gifts. The strategy seemed to work with most of the central and southern vassals, including Gov. Thray Sithu of Myinsaing, Gov. Thinkhaya of Toungoo and Gov. Thihapate of Taungdwin, who pledged their allegiance to the new king in Ava. In the case of Gov. Tarabya II of Pakhan, Thihathu's younger brother with a legitimate claim to the throne, Nyo also gave Queen Shin Saw Pu to further appease his half-cousin. However, Gov. Min Maha of Prome, Ava's southernmost state, did not acknowledge. In the north, Nyo received almost no support; only Baya Gamani of Singu and Le Than Bwa of Onbaung supported him.

The main reason was that Gov. Thado of Mohnyin (in present-day Kachin State) actively opposed Nyo. A loyalist of Minkhaung and Thihathu, Thado had been incensed by the news of Thihathu's assassination, which he heard from his 12-year-old son, who as a page of Thihathu had escaped the assassination. Over the next two months, Thado went on to secure the support of most of the northern Shan states (except Le Than Bwa's Onbaung).

=== Civil war ===
A brief civil war ensued. Although he controlled less territory, Thado was the aggressor. In February 1426, (Note: (Yazawin Thit Vol. 1 2012: 271) and (Hmannan Vol. 2 2003: 59): Tabaung 787 ME = 6 February 1426 to 7 March 1426) Thado marched south with an army, and his two teenage sons. They sailed down the Irrawaddy with squadrons of war boats and cargo ships. Nyo had set up defenses on both sides of the Irrawaddy with Le Than Bwa and 2000 troops defending the east bank and Thray Sithu and another 2000 troops at Thissein (modern Shwebo Township), about 100 kilometres (62 mi) north of Ava, on the west bank. The main army defending the capital was largely made up of units from the vassals that had pledged allegiance to him such as Myinsaing, Toungoo, Taungdwin and Pakhan.

Despite the preparations, Thissein fell quickly after a daring surprise attack from the river side by Thado's sons. The fort's defenses, which included 50 war boats, had not expected an attack by the Mohnyin navy as the Mohnyin army had not yet shown up. Indeed, after the capture of Thissein, the sons had to wait for their father's army to arrive for another ten days. At Thissein, Thado paused, and recruited more troops from the region. Then the enlarged forces of Mohnyin attacked Wetchet, where Thray Sithu was waiting with 3000 troops. Ava troops put up a fight but the town eventually fell. Thray Sithu and his deputy Sokkate, old commanders of the Forty Years' War, either fell in action or were captured as they are not mentioned in the chronicles afterwards. The command of Ava frontline defenses now passed to Le Than Bwa, now stationed near Sagaing, across the river from Ava. Instead of attacking head-on, Thado successfully persuaded Le Than Bwa to leave the fight by giving the sawbwa a substantial amount of gold and silver. (Note: (Maha Yazawin Vol. 2 2006: 60) does not specify the amount. (Yazawin Thit Vol. 1 2012: 271) says the amount of 10 viss (16.93 kg) of gold, and 50 silver cups. (Hmannan Vol. 2 2003: 59) says 3 viss (4.9 kg) of gold and 50 silver cups.)

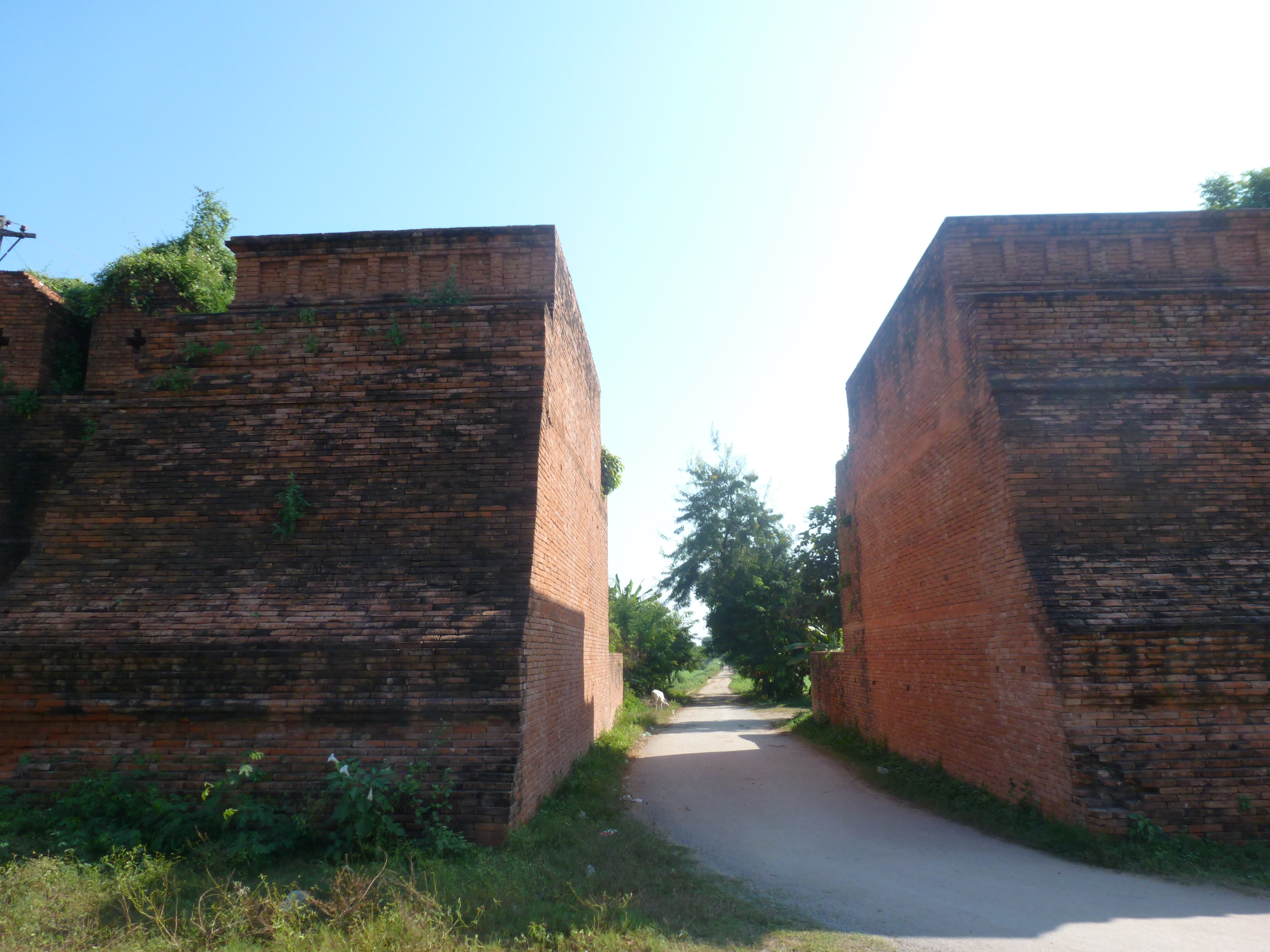
Remains of the outer walls of Ava today

Le Than Bwa's departure created a panic across the river. As Mohnyin troops closed in, the vassal rulers of Toungoo, Taungdwin and Pakhan renounced their ties to Nyo, and withdrew to their respective regions, taking their regiments with them. Nyo was now in a bind. He could neither defend Ava nor retreat to a loyal vassal region from which he could continue the fight. (He could not retreat to his old fief of Kale, as Mohnyin troops now controlled all routes to the north.) He accepted the advice of Baya Gamani, one of his few remaining loyalists, that he leave for Arakan, the disorganized former kingdom to the west where he might find support.

=== Death ===
Circa 15 May 1426, (Note: (Yazawin Thit Vol. 1 2012: 272): Thado entered the Ava palace on Thursday, the 10th waxing of Nayon 788 ME (16 May 1426).) under the cover of darkness, Nyo and Bo-Me fled the capital. In the end, only Gamani came with them; all other commanders, including Gamani's younger brother Yazathingyan, stayed behind and surrendered. Guarded only by Gamani's single battalion, Nyo and Bo-Me first ventured south by land along the Irrawaddy before sailing down to Salin. From there, they trekked west. Just a few days later, as they prepared to cross the Arakan Hills at Pe-Lun-Taung, west of present-day Shwesettaw, Nyo suddenly fell ill and died. Like his father, he ruled less than seven months. During his short reign, he restored the 12th-century Shwe Paung Laung Pagoda in Sagaing District.

After Nyo's death, Gamani, ignoring Bo-Me's fierce protests, stopped the journey, and waited to be arrested at Shwesettaw. When Bo-Me was brought before the new king in a royal palanquin befitting a crowned queen, the feisty queen reportedly dismissed Thado, who hailed from a more distant branch of the royal family, by saying someone "smells like a servant". Nonetheless, she became a queen of his.

== Historiography ==
Some historians consider Nyo to be the last king of the first dynasty of Ava, and Mohnyin Thado to be the founder of the next dynasty (Note: See (Htin Aung 1967: 337) and (Lieberman 2014: 4) for example.) while others consider both kings to be of the same dynasty. (Note: See (Harvey 1925: 366) and (Aung-Thwin 2017: 82–84) for example.) Among the main royal chronicles, only the Yazawin Thit states that Nyo belonged to the previous dynasty of Thayet (သရက် ဆက်) whereas Thado founded a new one, Thado Mohnyin (သတိုး မိုးညှင်း ဆက်). (Note: (Yazawin Thit Vol. 1 2012: 270, 272): Nyo was of the dynasty of Thayet (သရက် ဆက်) whereas Thado was the founder of the Thado Mohnyin dynasty (သတိုး မိုးညှင်း ဆက်). The chronicle lists both kings as monarchs of the First Ava Kingdom.)

The following is a list of the key events of Nyo's life as reported in the chronicles.

Source	Birth–Death	Age at Accession	Reign	Length of Reign	Age at Death	Reference
Zatadawbon Yazawin (List of Kings of Ava Section)	c. October 1381 [sic] – c. March 1427	44 (45th year) [sic]	c. August 1426 – March 1427	7 months	44 (45th year) [sic]	(Note: Zata's List of Kings entry for Nyo (Zata 1960: 46) says he was born on a Tuesday in the 9th month of 743 ME (c. 1 October 1381). He ascended the throne in his 45th year (at age 44) in 788 ME (30 March 1426 to 29 March 1427) [sic], reigned 7 months and died in the same year of 788 ME. Since (Zata 1960: 46) also says Nyo's predecessor reigned for 4 months in 788 ME, Nyo must have reigned in the remaining two thirds of 788 ME (c. August – March 1427). The birth year of 743 ME is most probably a typographical error of 747 ME; the Burmese numerals 3 (၃) and 7 (၇) can easily be miscopied.)
Zatadawbon Yazawin (Horoscopes Section)	c. 1 October 1395 [sic] – mid 1426	not mentioned	late 1425 – mid 1426	8 months	not mentioned	(Note: Zata's Royal Horoscopes Section (Zata 1960: 75) says Nyo, who was born on Tuesday, 5th nekkhat of the 9th month of 757 ME [sic] (c. 7th waxing of Tazaungmon 757 ME, 19 October 1395), reigned eight months. The entry does not say when he ascended the throne but the entries for his predecessor (Min Hla) and successor (Mohnyin Thado) on pages 74 and 75 respectively, suggest that Nyo came to power sometime in mid 787 ME (late 1425) and lost power in early 788 ME (mid 1426).)
Maha Yazawin	c. 1386 – by 3 June 1426	39 (40th year)	November 1425 – May 1426	7 months	40 (41st year)	(Note: (Maha Yazawin Vol. 2 2006: 60–61): Nyo was a Tuesday born; ascended the throne in his 40th year (age 39) in Nadaw 787 ME (10 November – 8 December 1425); reigned 7 months; died in 41st year (age 40) in Nayon 788 ME (6 May – 3 June 1426).)
Yazawin Thit	c. 1385 – by 3 June 1426	40 (41st year)	by 9 November 1425 – 16 May 1426	7 months	40 (41st year)	(Note: (Yazawin Thit Vol. 1 2012: 271–272): A Tuesday born, Nyo ascended the throne in his 41st year (age 40) in Tazaungmon 787 ME (11 October – 9 November 1425), meaning he was king by the 15th waning/new moon of Tazaungmon (9 November 1425); reigned 7 months; died in 41st year (age 40) in Nayon 788 ME (6 May – 3 June 1426). The next king Mohnyin Thado ascended the throne on Thursday, the 10th waxing of Nayon 788 ME (Wednesday, 15 May 1426); the actual date may have been the 11th waxing.)
Hmannan Yazawin	c. 1385 – by 3 June 1426	40 (41st year)	November 1425 – May 1426	7 months	40, about to turn 41 (41st year, about to enter 42nd year)	(Note: (Hmannan Vol. 2 2003: 59–60): A Tuesday born, Nyo ascended the throne in his 41st year (age 40) in Nadaw 787 ME (10 November – 8 December 1425); reigned 7 months; died as he was about to enter his 42nd year (before turning 41) in Nayon 788 ME (6 May – 3 June 1426). The next king ascended the throne in the waxing half of Nayon (3 – 19 May 1426).)

== Bibliography ==
- Aung-Thwin, Michael A. (2017). Myanmar in the Fifteenth Century. Honolulu: University of Hawai'i Press. ISBN 978-0-8248-6783-6.
- Harvey, G. E. (1925). History of Burma: From the Earliest Times to 10 March 1824. London: Frank Cass & Co. Ltd.
- Htin Aung, Maung (1967). A History of Burma. New York and London: Cambridge University Press.
- Kala, U (2006) [1724]. Maha Yazawin (in Burmese). Vol. 1–3 (4th printing ed.). Yangon: Ya-Pyei Publishing.
- Lieberman, Victor B. (2014) [1984]. Burmese Administrative Cycles: Anarchy and Conquest, c. 1580–1760. Princeton University Press. ISBN 978-0-691-05407-0.
- Maha Sithu (2012) [1798]. Myint Swe; Kyaw Win; Thein Hlaing (eds.). Yazawin Thit (in Burmese). Vol. 1–3 (2nd printing ed.). Yangon: Ya-Pyei Publishing.
- Royal Historians of Burma (1960) [c. 1680]. U Hla Tin (Hla Thamein) (ed.). Zatadawbon Yazawin (in Burmese). Historical Research Directorate of the Union of Burma.
- Royal Historical Commission of Burma (2003) [1832]. Hmannan Yazawin (in Burmese). Vol. 1–3. Yangon: Ministry of Information, Myanmar.
- Than Tun (December 1959). "History of Burma: A.D. 1300–1400". Journal of Burma Research Society. XLII (II).

Kale Kye-Taung Nyo Ava Kingdom Born: c. 10 October 1385 Died: late May 1426
Regnal titles
Preceded by Min Hla	King of Ava by 9 November 1425 – 16 May 1426	Succeeded by Mohnyin Thado
Royal titles
Preceded by Tarabya	Heir to the Burmese Throne c. April 1400 – 25 November 1400	Succeeded by Theiddat
Preceded by Anawrahta as acting	Governor of Kale c. December 1406 – November 1425	Succeeded by Shan Say-Hu
