= Saw Pyei Chantha of Taungdwin =

Saw Pyei Chantha စောပြည့်ချမ်းသာ

Duchess of Taungdwin
- Tenure: 1441 – 1472/73
- Predecessor: unknown
- Successor: Min Myat Hla

Duchess of Toungoo
- Tenure: 1459 – 1466
- Predecessor: Princess of Yamethin
- Successor: unknown
- Born: c. 1419; Ava (Inwa); Ava Kingdom
- Died: 1472/73 or later Taungdwin? Ava Kingdom
- Spouse: Thiri Zeya Thura of Taungdwin
- Father: Thihathu of Ava
- Mother: Saw Min Hla
- Religion: Theravada Buddhism

Saw Pyei Chantha (Burmese: စောပြည့်ချမ်းသာ, pronounced [sɔ́ bjḛ tɕʰáɴðà]) was duchess of Taungdwin from 1441 to the 1470s, and duchess of Toungoo from 1459 to 1466. She was a daughter of King Thihathu (r. 1421–1425) and Queen Saw Min Hla of Ava, and a younger sister of King King Min Hla of Ava (r. 1425).

== Brief ==
Princess Saw Pyei Chantha had two full siblings, older brother Min Hla, and a younger sister Shwe Pyi Shin Me, (Note: (Maha Yazawin Vol. 2 2006: 56) says Min Hla had just one younger sister, Saw Pyei Chantha. But (Yazawin Thit Vol. 1 2012: 270) says Min Hla had another the sister, the youngest sibling, Shwe Pyi Shin Me. (Hmannan Vol. 2 2003: 54) follows Yazawin Thit's account.) and four older maternal half-siblings—Minye Kyawhtin, Min Hla Htut, Minye Aung Naing, Saw Min Phyu, from his mother's first marriage to her paternal uncle Crown Prince Minye Kyawswa. Her mother was wedded to her father in 1416, a year after the death of Minye Kyawswa, by her grandfather King Minkhaung I (r. 1400–1421).

In 1434, the princess married Thiri Zeya Thura, a nephew of King Thado. The couple was still alive in 1472/73. A contemporary mawgun inscription says Thiri Zeya Thura and Saw Pyei Chantha of Taungdwin pledged their loyalty to King Thihathura of Ava in 1472/73.

== Ancestry ==
Ancestry of Princess Saw Pyei Chantha

8. Swa Saw Ke
4. Minkhaung I
9. Saw Beza
2. Thihathu of Ava
10. Tho Ngan Bwa of Mohnyin
5. Shin Mi-Nauk of Mohnyin
11. unnamed
1. Min Hla
12. unnamed
6. Tarabya I of Pakhan
13. unnamed
3. Saw Min Hla
14. unnamed
7. unnamed
15. unnamed

== Bibliography ==
- Kala, U (1724). Maha Yazawin (in Burmese). Vol. 1–3 (2006, 4th printing ed.). Yangon: Ya-Pyei Publishing.
- Maha Sithu (2012) [1798]. Kyaw Win; Thein Hlaing (eds.). Yazawin Thit (in Burmese). Vol. 1–3 (2nd ed.). Yangon: Ya-Pyei Publishing.
- Royal Historical Commission of Burma (1832). Hmannan Yazawin (in Burmese). Vol. 1–3 (2003 ed.). Yangon: Ministry of Information, Myanmar.
