= Thihathu of Ava =

King of Ava (1394–1425)

Thihathu of Ava ဆင်ဖြူရှင် သီဟသူ
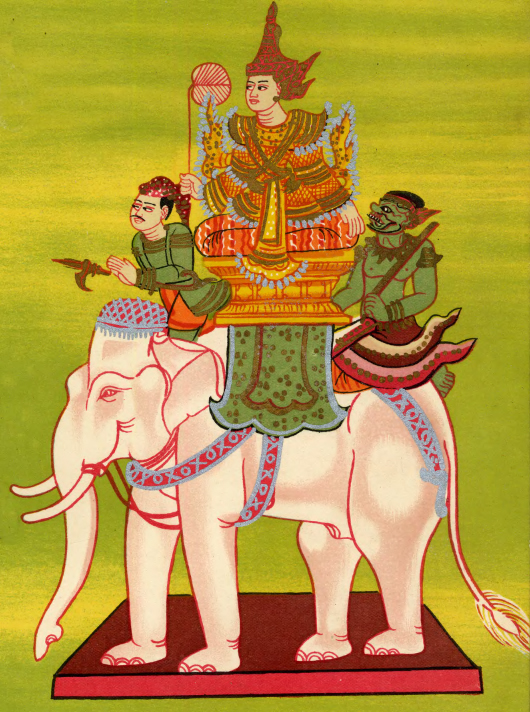
- Thihathu depicted as the Aung Pinle Hsinbyushin nat (spirit)

King of Ava
- Reign: c. October 1421 – August 1425
- Predecessor: Minkhaung I
- Successor: Min Hla

Heir to the Burmese Throne
- Reign: 1416–1421
- Predecessor: Minye Kyawswa
- Successor: Min Hla

Governor of Prome
- Reign: 1413–1416
- Predecessor: Minye Kyawswa
- Successor: Saw Shwe Khet
- Monarch: Minkhaung I

Governor of Sagaing
- Reign: 1408–1413
- Predecessor: Theiddat
- Successor: Yazathingyan
- Monarch: Minkhaung I
- Born: c. 3 June 1394 (Note: Wednesday in the 4th month (First Waso) of 756 ME, when 6 nekkhats were lined up.); Wednesday, 6th waxing of First Waso 756 ME; Pyinzi; Ava Kingdom
- Died: August 1425 (aged 31); Tawthalin 787 ME; Aung Pinle; Ava Kingdom
- Consort: Saw Min Hla (m. 1416) Shin Bo-Me (m. 1421) Shin Saw Pu (m. 1423)
- Issue: Min Hla; Saw Pyei Chantha; Shwe Pyi Shin Me
- House: Pinya
- Father: Minkhaung I
- Mother: Shin Mi-Nauk
- Religion: Theravada Buddhism

Thihathu of Ava (Burmese: သီဟသူ, pronounced [θìha̰ðù]; also known as Aung Pinle Hsinbyushin Thihathu; 1394–1425) was king of Ava from 1421 to 1425. Though he opportunistically renewed the Forty Years' War with Hanthawaddy Pegu in 1422, Thihathu agreed to a peace treaty with Prince Binnya Ran in 1423. His subsequent marriage to Ran's sister Princess Shin Saw Pu helped keep the peace between the two kingdoms when Ran became king of Pegu in 1424.

Thihathu was assassinated in 1425 in a coup engineered by Queen Shin Bo-Me. He is remembered as the Aung Pinle Hsinbyushin (Burmese: အောင်ပင်လယ် ဆင်ဖြူရှင် [ʔàʊɴ bɪ̀ɴlɛ̀ sʰɪ̀ɴbjùʃɪ̀ɴ]; lit. 'Lord of the White Elephant of Aung Pinle') nat in the pantheon of Burmese nat spirits.

== Early life ==
Born c. 3 June 1394, Minye Thihathu (မင်းရဲ သီဟသူ) was the third child of Prince Min Swe of Pyinzi and Princess Shin Mi-Nauk. His father was a son of then King Swa Saw Ke of Ava while his mother was a daughter of Sawbwa (Chief) Tho Ngan Bwa (Si Lun Fa) of Mohnyin. The prince had two older siblings Prince Minye Kyawswa and Princess Saw Pyei Chantha, and a younger brother Prince Minye Kyawhtin. The family lived in Pyinzi, 60 km south of the capital Ava (Inwa), until 1400. Thihathu was six when his father ascended the Ava throne with the title of Minkhaung on 25 November 1400.

Thihathu grew up in Ava amidst the Forty Years' War with the southern Mon-speaking kingdom of Hanthawaddy Pegu. He became second in line to the Ava throne c. December 1406 when his elder brother Minye Kyawswa was appointed crown prince. This prompted their uncle Prince Theiddat of Sagaing, who was instrumental in placing Minkhaung on the throne and had considered himself heir apparent, to defect to Pegu in 1407. After the death of Theiddat c. July 1408, Minkhaung appointed his middle son governor of Sagaing, the capital of the northern province.

== Governorships ==
In the next eight years, Thihathu held two important governorships at Sagaing and at Prome. He remained in the shadow of Minye Kyawswa until his elder brother's death in 1415, before emerging as the next heir apparent in 1416.

=== Sagaing (1408–1413) ===
His time at Sagaing was unremarkable. Unlike his militaristic elder brother, Thihathu did not take a major role in the military. Except for one naval operation to protect the riverine supply lines along the Irrawaddy in 1409–1410, he did not take part in any of the campaigns between 1408 and 1413. Though Thihathu was governor of Sagaing, when China and her client Shan states began raiding Ava's northern territories, it was Minye Kyawswa that Minkhaung recalled to face the enemy in 1412 and again in 1413. In 1413, Minkhaung reassigned Thihathu to Prome, the key frontline city near the Hanthawaddy border.

=== Prome (1413–1416) ===
His first year at Prome was quiet although Ava and Pegu were still officially at war. Thihathu led the southern command until 1414 when Minye Kyawswa returned to lead the next invasion of Pegu in 1414. The 1414–1415 campaign proved to be the height of the Forty Years' War but both missions Thihathu led failed. First, his naval convoy protecting Ava supply lines was driven back in the Irrawaddy delta by Prince Binnya Bassein. His next assignment to open a new front into Pegu via Toungoo (Toungoo) also failed; Thihathu and his deputy Gov. Thado of Mohnyin could not even get past the first Hanthawaddy garrison at Fort Sayat.

Nevertheless, Thihathu became in charge of the southern command after Minye Kyawswa's death in 1415. In 1416, (Note: (Maha Yazawin Vol. 2 2006: 54) says the Hanthawaddy attack on Toungoo took place in 779 ME (1417/18) but (Yazawin Thit Vol. 1 2012: 263) and (Hmannan Vol. 2 2003: 50) say it took place in 778 ME (1416/17).) he led an 8000-strong army to decisively defeat the 7000-strong army led by Prince Binnya Dhammaraza near Toungoo. It was Thihathu's first real military success but Minkhaung was pleased with his son's performance. The king not only appointed Thihathu heir-apparent but also married him to Saw Min Hla, the widow of Minye Kyawswa.

== Crown prince ==
As crown prince, Thihathu continued to be responsible for the war effort. In 1417, he invaded the south by land and river with 16,000 troops. After much fighting, his forces managed to capture Dagon and Hmawbi, forcing Razadarit to leave Pegu for Martaban for a time. But they could not advance to Pegu before the rainy season of 1418 arrived. They made no further gains, and had to retreat in the following dry season. Thihathu did bring back Prince Binnya Set of Dagon as a war captive to Ava. Minkhaung treated Set well in Ava but did not return him. By keeping Set in Ava, Minkhaung felt he had evened the score with his southern rival, and launched no more campaigns. Razadarit too observed the impromptu ceasefire. The ceasefire lasted to the end of reigns of Minkhaung and Razadarit both of whom died in late 1421 within two months of each other.

== Reign ==
=== Accession ===
Minye Thihathu ascended the throne with Saw Min Hla by his side c. October 1421. The 27-year-old king also raised his father's favorite queen Shin Bo-Me as his own. His reign name was Thiha Thura Maha Dhamma Yaza (သီဟသူရ မဟာ ဓမ္မရာဇာ; Pali: Sīhasura Mahādhammarājā). Shortly after, he added the title of Hsinbyushin (ဆင်ဖြူရှင်; "Lord of the White Elephant") when two of his vassals presented two white elephants, (Note: (Yazawin Thit Vol. 1 2012: 266): One from Gov. Ottama Thiri Zeya Nawrahta of Myedu, and the other from Gov. Saw Shwe Khet of Prome) considered highly propitious by Burmese monarchs.

=== Renewal of war with Pegu (1422–1423) ===
Thihathu's first major act as king was to renew the war with Pegu in early 1422. It was an opportunistic attempt to take advantage of the succession crisis following Razadarit's unexpected death c. December 1421. Thihathu decided to get involved when Prince Binnya Kyan of Dala, one of the pretenders to the throne, sought his help. Though he could only dispatch two regiments (2000 troops) on short notice, it was enough to retake Dala from the troops of King Binnya Dhammaraza (r. 1421–1424). But the success was short lived. The ensuing indiscriminate looting and deportations of townfolk by the Ava troops greatly angered Kyan, who soon reached a deal with his older brother Dhammaraza drive out the northerners. Dhammaraza sent another army to Dala while Kyan treacherously engineered the murder of principal officers of the Ava army inside Dala. Only about half the Ava troops got back to Prome. Prome's southernmost district Tharrawaddy (Thayawadi) fell to Prince Binnya Ran, another pretender to the Hanthawaddy throne.

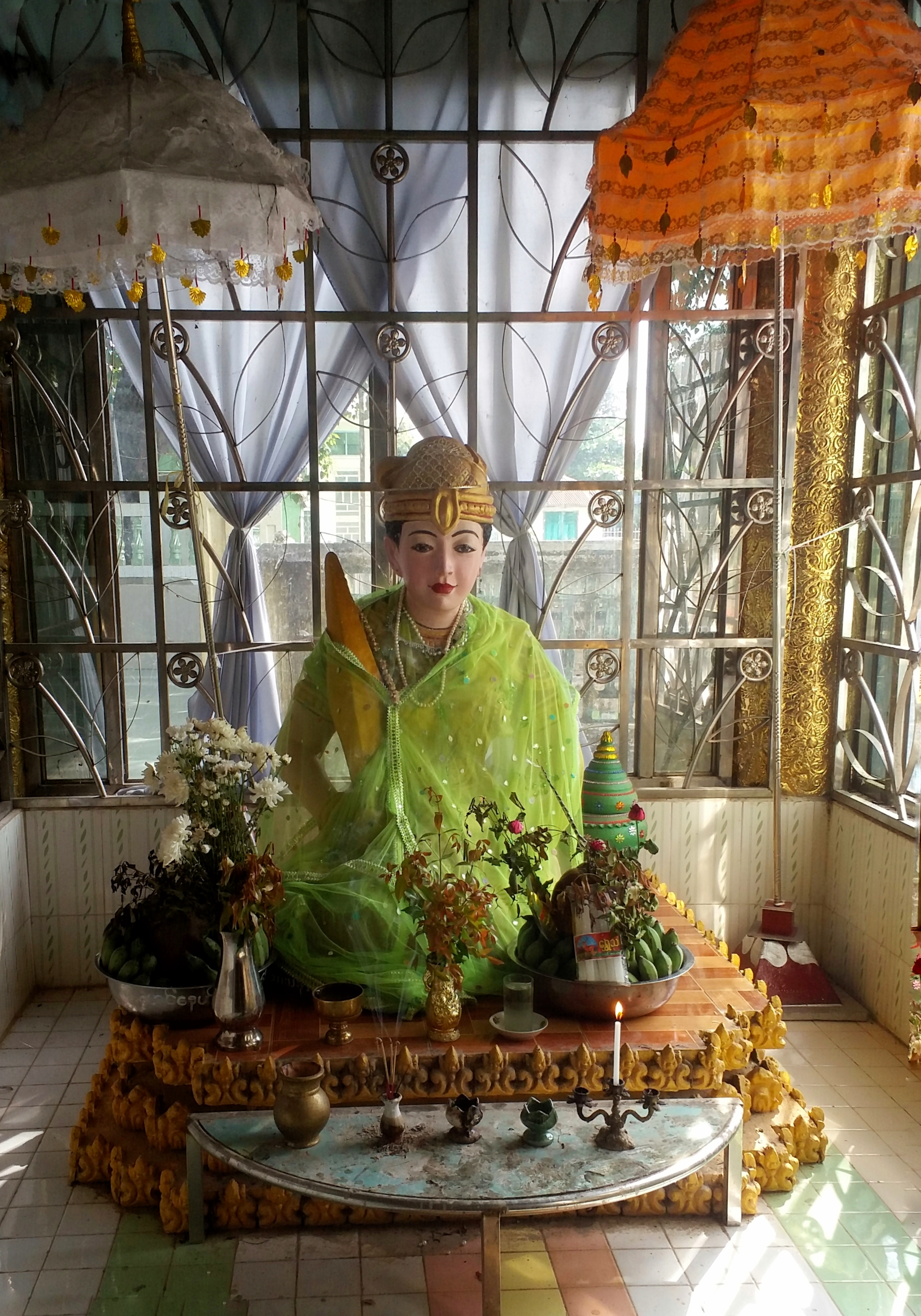
A statue depicting Queen Shin Saw Pu

Thihathu was now forced to respond. At the start of the next dry season, in November/December 1422, (Note: (Yazawin Thit Vol. 1 2012: 268) and (Hmannan Vol. 2 2003: 56): Nadaw 784 ME = 14 November 1422 to 12 December 1422) he sent an 8000-strong army led by Gov. Thado of Mohnyin and a 6000-man naval force led by Gov. Nyo of Kale Kye-Taung. Their main target was the Irrawaddy delta, which was controlled by Ran, who by then had emerged as the principal power in the south. (The nominal king Dhammaraza controlled only around the capital Pegu while Kyan had just moved to Martaban (Mottama) as viceroy of the eastern province.) Ava troops went on occupy the delta, taking Khebaung, Bassein (Pathein), and Dala in succession, and laid siege to Dagon where Ran was based. A month into the siege, Ran offered his full sister Princess Shin Saw Pu in a marriage alliance, and renounced his claim to Tharrawaddy. Unlike his late fiery brother, Thihathu did not consider Hanthawaddy an enemy that must be defeated. Thihathu readily accepted the offer, and came down by the royal barge surrounded by another 7000 troops to Dagon to formalize the treaty with Ran. He married the 28-year-old princess, who was a widow with two young children, as a principal queen. Upon withdrawal, Thihathu made a point to stop by Tharrawaddy, the land he had regained.

=== Last years ===
According to the royal chronicles, Thihathu was completely enamored with Shin Saw Pu, and spent most of his time with her. This led to a jealous rage by his previous favorite queen, Shin Bo-Me. It was not the first time that Thihathu discarded his older consorts. After his accession, he spent so much of his time with Bo-Me, who was also his father Minkhaung's favorite queen, that his chief queen Saw Mon Hla moved out of the palace to retire into religion.

Unlike Mon Hla, Bo-Me would not go away quietly. To place Prince Nyo of Kale Kye-Taung on the throne, she arranged to have the king assassinated. In August 1425, Nyo's ally Gov. Le Than Bwa of Onbaung (Hsipaw/Thibaw) with a sizable force ambushed Thihathu at Aung Pinle (modern Amarapura, Mandalay), the location Bo-Me had provided. Though undermanned, Thihathu fought back the enemy on his war elephant but was killed after being hit by three arrow shots. The king was 31. (Note: All the chronicles say that he was in his 31st year (age 30) at death. However, if he was born in June 1394 per (Zata 1960: 74), and died in August 1425 per (Maha Yazawin Vol. 2 2006: 59), (Yazawin Thit Vol. 1 2012: 270) and (Hmannan Vol. 2 2003: 58), he must have died in his 32nd year (at age 31).)

Having suffered a violent death, Thihathu entered the Burmese pantheon of nats as Aung Pinle Hsinbyushin. As a nat, He is portrayed sitting cross-legged on a throne on elephantback in full regalia, with one of the elephant attendants crouching in front and another on horseback wielding a sword.

Chronicles remember him as a handsome, good-natured, and womanizing royal. He was succeeded by his eight-year-old son Min Hla. However, Min Hla's reign lasted just three months as Bo-Me poisoned him, and put Nyo on the throne.

== Family ==
Thihathu had three queens and three children. According to the Maha Yazawin, Thihathu's first marriage was to his first cousin Princess Min Hla Htut but the marriage soon ended in divorce. But the Yazawin Thit rejects that the marriage ever occurred, citing a 1415/16 inscription. (Note: The Yazawin Thit cites a 777 ME (1415/16 CE) inscription which states that Min Htut and Shwe Khet were married in 765 ME (1403/04) when Thihathu (b. 1394) was at most nine years old. This means Thihathu would have been even younger if Hla Htut and Thihathu were married prior to 1403/04.) The Hmannan Yazawin chronicle accepts Yazawin Thit's rejection.

The Mani Yadanabon says Thihathu's first wife (unnamed) died at the age of 25; (Note: Per the Mani Yadanabon, Thihathu's first wife died in her 26th year and first month—i.e. she was 25 years and one month old at the time of her death.) shortly after her death, King Minkhaung married Thihathu and Saw Min Hla.

| Queen | Rank | Issue | Reference |
|---|---|---|---|
| Saw Min Hla | Chief queen (r. 1421−1425) | King Min Hla of Ava (r. 1425); Saw Pyei Chantha of Taungdwin; Shwe Pyi Shin Me | |
| Shin Bo-Me | Queen of the Northern Palace (r. 1421−1425) | none | |
| Shin Saw Pu | Queen of the Central Palace (r. 1423–1425) | none | |

== Historiography ==
The following is a list of key life events as reported in the main chronicles. All of the chronicles say he died in his 31st year (at age 30) although not all of them are internally consistent with regard to their own birth and death dates and their own age at death as seen below.

| Source | Birth–Death | Age at Accession | Age at Death | Reign | Length of Reign | Reference |
|---|---|---|---|---|---|---|
| Zatadawbon Yazawin (List of Kings of Ava Section) | June/July 1393 [sic] – [c. April] 1426 [sic] | 27 (28th year) [sic] | 30 (31st year) [sic] | 1423/24 [sic] – [c. April] 1426 [sic] | 3 | (Note: Zata's List of Kings entry for Thihathu (Zata 1960: 46) is internally inconsistent. It says Thihathu was born on a Wednesday in the 4th month (Waso) of 785 ME [sic] (11 June 18 June, 25 June or 2 July 1393); ascended the throne in his 28th year [sic] in 785 ME [sic]; and died in 788 ME [sic] (30 March 1426 to 29 March 1427) after a reign of 3 years. Since (Zata 1960: 46) also says his successor reigned four months in 788 ME, Thihathu must have died in the first 8 months of 788 ME (30 March–December 1426).) |
| Zatadawbon Yazawin (Horoscopes Section) | c. 3 June 1394 – 1425 | 27 (28th year) | 30 (31st year) | 1421/22 – 1425 | 3 | (Note: The Horoscopes Section (Zata 1960: 74): Thihathu was born on a Wednesday in the 4th month (First Waso) of 756 ME, when 6 nekkhats were lined up; ascended the throne in his 28th year; and died in his 31st year. And because his successor Min Hla reigned four months in 787 ME (30 March 1425 to 29 March 1426), Thihathu must have died in the first 8 months of 787 ME (30 March to December 1425).) |
| Maha Yazawin | c. 1394/95 – August/September 1425 | 27 (28th year) | 30 (31st year) | 1422/23 – August/September 1425 | 3 | (Note: (Maha Yazawin Vol. 2 2006: 56, 59): Thihathu ascended the throne in 784 ME (30 March 1422 to 29 March 1423) in his 28th year (at age 27); reigned three years; died in his 31st year (at age 30) in Tawthalin 787 ME (13 August to 11 September 1425).) |
| Yazawin Thit | 1394/95 [early 1395 implied] – August/September 1425 | 26 (27th year) | 30 (31st year) | 1421 – August/September 1425 | 4 | (Note: (Yazawin Thit Vol. 1 2012: 266, 270): Thihathu was born in 756 ME (30 March 1394 to 29 March 1395); ascended the throne in his 27th year (at age 26) in 783 ME (30 March 1421 to 29 March 1422); reigned four years; died in his 31st year (at age 30) in Tawthalin 787 ME (13 August to 11 September 1425).) |
| Hmannan Yazawin | 1394/95 [early 1395 implied] – August/September 1425 | 26 (27th year) | 30 (31st year) | 1421 – August/September 1425 | 4 | (Note: Hmannan follows Yazawin Thit. (Hmannan Vol. 2 2003: 53, 58): Thihathu was born in 756 ME (30 March 1394 to 29 March 1395); ascended the throne in his 27th year (at age 26) in 783 ME (30 March 1421 to 29 March 1422); reigned four years; died in his 31st year (at age 30) in Tawthalin 787 ME (13 August to 11 September 1425).) |

== Bibliography ==
- Fernquest, Jon (Autumn 2006). "Crucible of War: Burma and the Ming in the Tai Frontier Zone (1382–1454)" (PDF). SOAS Bulletin of Burma Research. 4 (2).
- Harvey, G. E. (1925). History of Burma: From the Earliest Times to 10 March 1824. London: Frank Cass & Co. Ltd.
- Htin Aung, Maung (1967). A History of Burma. New York and London: Cambridge University Press.
- Kala, U (2006) [1724]. Maha Yazawin (in Burmese). Vol. 1–3 (4th printing ed.). Yangon: Ya-Pyei Publishing.
- Maha Sithu (2012) [1798]. Myint Swe; Kyaw Win; Thein Hlaing (eds.). Yazawin Thit (in Burmese). Vol. 1–3 (2nd printing ed.). Yangon: Ya-Pyei Publishing.
- Phayre, Major Gen. Sir Arthur P. (1873). "The History of Pegu". Journal of the Asiatic Society of Bengal. 42. Oxford University.
- Royal Historians of Burma (1960) [c. 1680]. U Hla Tin (Hla Thamein) (ed.). Zatadawbon Yazawin. Historical Research Directorate of the Union of Burma.
- Royal Historical Commission of Burma (2003) [1832]. Hmannan Yazawin (in Burmese). Vol. 1–3. Yangon: Ministry of Information, Myanmar.
- Sandalinka, Shin (2009) [1781]. Mani Yadanabon (in Burmese) (4th printing ed.). Yangon: Seit-Ku Cho Cho.
- Than Tun (December 1959). "History of Burma: A.D. 1300–1400". Journal of Burma Research Society. XLII (II).

Thihathu of Ava Ava Kingdom Born: 3 June 1394 Died: August 1425
Regnal titles
| Preceded by Minkhaung I | King of Ava c. October 1421 – August 1425 | Succeeded by Min Hla |
Royal titles
| Preceded by Minye Kyawswa | Heir to the Burmese Throne; 1416–1421 | Succeeded by Min Hla |
| Preceded by Minye Kyawswa | Governor of Prome; 1413–1416 | Succeeded by Saw Shwe Khet |
| Preceded by Theiddat | Governor of Sagaing; 1408–1413 | Succeeded by Yazathingyan |
