= Shin Bo-Me =

Shin Bo-Me ရှင်ဘို့မယ်

Queen of the Northern Palace of Ava
- Tenure: late May 1426 – April 1439
- Predecessor: Shin Sawbu
- Successor: Tanzaung Mibaya

Chief queen consort of Ava
- Tenure: by 9 November 1425 – 16 May 1426
- Predecessor: Saw Min Hla
- Successor: Shin Myat Hla

Queen of the Northern Palace of Ava
- Tenure: c. October 1421 – August 1425
- Predecessor: Saw Khway
- Successor: Shin Sawbu

Queen of the Western Palace of Ava
- Tenure: c. August 1408 – c. October 1421
- Predecessor: Shin Mi-Nauk
- Successor: Taungdwin Mibaya
- Born: 1390s Taungdwin
- Died: Unknown; Ava (Inwa)
- Spouse: Minkhaung I (1408–1421); Thihathu (1421–1425); Kale Kye-Taung Nyo (1425–1426); Mohnyin Thado (1426–1439)
- Issue: None
- Father: Theingathu
- Mother: Saw Salaka Dewi
- Religion: Theravada Buddhism

Shin Bo-Me or Shin Bo-Meh (Shin-BOH-meh ,Burmese: ရှင်ဘို့မယ်, [ʃɪ̀ɰ̃ bo̰ mɛ̀]; also spelled Shin Bo-Mai) was a principal queen of four kings of Ava in the early 15th century.

== Brief ==
Considered a great beauty, Bo-Me was the favorite queen of Minkhaung I. She was also a half-niece of Minkhaung; her mother Saw Salaka Dewi and Minkhaung were half-siblings. Although the Hmannan Yazawin chronicle states she became the chief queen of Minkhaung in 1407/08, an inscription dated 28 February 1409 by Queen Shin Saw states that Saw was still the chief queen in 1409. She was also the favorite queen of Minkhaung's son and successor Thihathu until Shin Saw Pu became queen. In August 1425, Bo-Me engineered the death of Thihathu by getting Le Than Bwa of Onbaung to assassinate the king. She might have married the successor, eight-year-old Min Hla. (Note: (Harvey 1925: 97) says Mohnyin Thado was her "fifth crowned consort". But the chronicles do not say that Bo-Me ever married the 8-year-old Min Hla; they say only that she had him poisoned.) Three months later, she poisoned the boy king and put her lover Prince Min Nyo on the Ava throne, and became the chief queen. In May 1426, Nyo was overthrown by Gov. Thado of Mohnyin, who subsequently made Bo-Me a junior queen.

== Ancestry ==
The following is her ancestry as given in the Hmannan Yazawin chronicle. (Note: See (Hmannan Vol. 1 2003: 372). Her mother, Salaka Dewi, may have married more than once—(Hmannan Vol. 1 2003: 404). Salaka Dewi, daughter of Swa Saw Ke was married to Sithu of Myinsaing—or Salaka Dewi's husband had two titles over his career, Sithu and Theinkhathu.) She was a granddaughter of King Swa Saw Ke of Ava, and Kyawswa I of Pinya, and a great granddaughter of King Thihathu of Pinya and King Kyawswa of Pagan.

Ancestry of Queen Bo-Me

8. Thihapate I of Taungdwin
4. Theinkhathu Saw Hnaung
9. Saw Pale of Pinya
2. Theinkhathu of Taungdwin
10. Min Shin Saw of Thayet
5. Saw Myat
11. Shin Myat Hla of Prome
1. Bo-Me
12. Min Shin Saw of Thayet
6. Swa Saw Ke
13. Shin Myat Hla of Prome
3. Saw Salaka Dewi
14. Kyawswa I of Pinya
7. Saw Min Hla of Nyaungyan
15. Mway Medaw of Pinya

== Bibliography ==
- Harvey, G. E. (1925). History of Burma: From the Earliest Times to 10 March 1824. London: Frank Cass & Co. Ltd.
- Htin Aung, Maung (1967). A History of Burma. New York and London: Cambridge University Press.
- Royal Historical Commission of Burma (2003) [1832]. Hmannan Yazawin (in Burmese). Vol. 1–3. Yangon: Ministry of Information, Myanmar.
- Than Tun (December 1959). "History of Burma: A.D. 1300–1400". Journal of Burma Research Society. XLII (II).

Shin Bo-Me Ava Dynasty Born: 1390s Died: ?
Royal titles
Preceded by Shin Sawbu	Queen of the Northern Palace of Ava; May 1426 – May 1439	Succeeded by Tanzaung Mibaya
Preceded by Saw Min Hla	Chief queen consort of Ava; August 1425– May 1426	Succeeded by Shin Myat Hla
Preceded by Saw Khway	Queen of the Northern Palace of Ava c. October 1421 – August 1425	Succeeded by Shin Sawbu
Preceded by Shin Mi-Nauk	Queen of the Western Palace of Ava; August 1408 – c. October 1421	Succeeded by Taungdwin Mibaya
