= Shwesettaw Wildlife Sanctuary =

Protected area in Myanmar

- Burmese: ရွှေစက်တော် တောရိုင်းတိရစ္ဆာန် ဘေးမဲ့တော
- IUCN category IV (habitat/species management area)
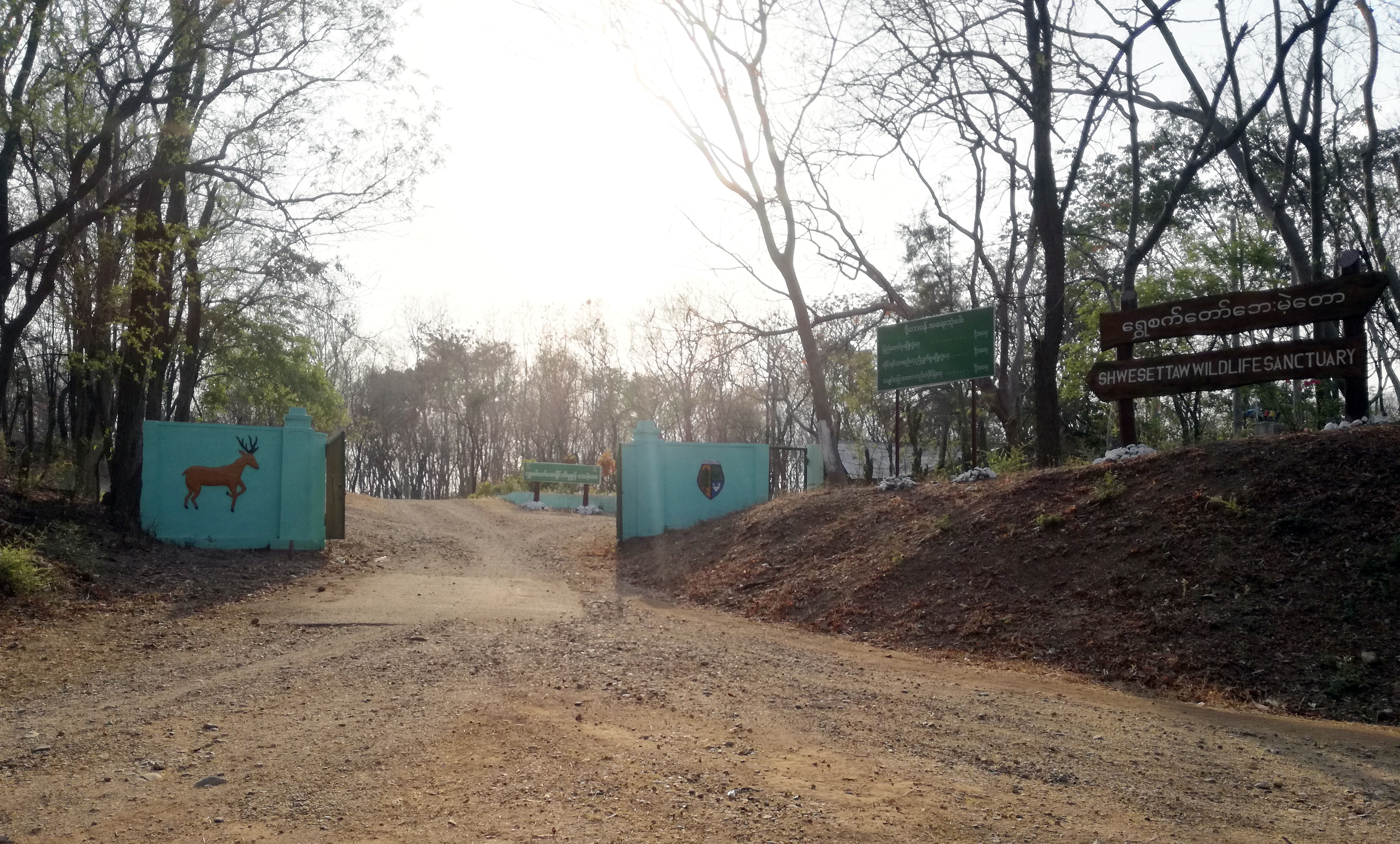

- Location within Myanmar
- Location: Magway Region, Myanmar
- Coordinates: 20°12′N 94°35′E
- Area: 464.09 km^{2} (179.19 sq mi)
- Established: 1985

Shwesettaw Wildlife Sanctuary is a protected area in Myanmar, covering 464.09 km^{2} (179.19 sq mi). It was established in 1985. In elevation, it ranges from 55 to 555 m (180 to 1,821 ft) and harbours mixed deciduous forest in the Minbu, Pwintphyu, Saytotetaya and Ngape Townships in the Magway Region.
