= Min Hla of Ava =

Min Hla မင်းလှ

King of Ava
- Reign: August 1425 – November 1425
- Predecessor: Thihathu
- Successor: Kale Kye-Taung Nyo
- Born: c. 26 April 1417 c. Monday, 11th waxing of Kason 779 ME; Ava (Inwa); Ava Kingdom
- Died: by 9 November 1425 (aged 8) by Friday, 15th waning of Tazaungmon 787 ME; Ava; Ava Kingdom
- House: Pinya
- Father: Thihathu
- Mother: Saw Min Hla
- Religion: Theravada Buddhism

Min Hla (Burmese: မင်းလှ, pronounced [mɪ́ɰ̃ l̥a̰]; also known as Min Hla Nge, မင်းလှငယ် [mɪ́ɰ̃ l̥a̰ ŋɛ̀], lit. 'Min Hla the Young'; 1417–1425) was king of Ava for three months in 1425. The eldest child of King Thihathu of Ava (r. 1421–1425) was only 8 when he was placed on the throne by the court, following the assassination of his father. The boy king too was assassinated three months later by Queen Shin Bo-Me, who had arranged his father's assassination. He was succeeded by Prince Nyo of Kale Kye-Taung, Bo-Me's lover.

== Brief ==
Min Hla was born to Princess Saw Min Hla and Crown Prince Thihathu in Ava (Inwa), c. 26 April 1417. (Note: The main royal chronicles (Maha Yazawin Vol. 2 2006: 59–60), (Yazawin Thit Vol. 1 2012: 270) and (Hmannan Vol. 2 2003: 58) all say that he became king at age 8 (in his 9th year) in August/September 1425, meaning he was born in early 779 ME (1417). The chronicle Zatadawbon Yazawin (Zata 1960: 74) says he was born on Monday, 11th nekkhat of the 2nd month of 774 ME. But the birth year of 774 ME is most likely a typographical error, and should be 779 ME per the other chronicles. Indeed, Monday, 11th waxing of Kason of 779 ME = Monday, 26 April 1417.) The prince had two younger sisters, Saw Pyei Chantha and Shwe Pyi Shin Me, (Note: (Maha Yazawin Vol. 2 2006: 56) says Min Hla had just one younger sister, Saw Pyei Chantha. But (Yazawin Thit Vol. 1 2012: 270) says Min Hla had another the sister, the youngest sibling, Shwe Pyi Shin Me. (Hmannan Vol. 2 2003: 54) follows Yazawin Thit's account.) and four older maternal half-siblings—Minye Kyawhtin, Min Hla Htut, Minye Aung Naing, Saw Min Phyu, from his mother's first marriage to his uncle Crown Prince Minye Kyawswa. His mother was wedded to his father in 1416, a year after the death of Minye Kyawswa, by his grandfather King Minkhaung I (r. 1400–1421).

Minkhaung died in 1421, and with Thihathu's accession, a 4-year-old Min Hla became the heir-presumptive of the kingdom. About four years later in August 1425, Thihathu was assassinated in an attempted coup by one of his queens, Shin Bo-Me, who had planned to place her lover Prince Nyo of Kale (Kalay) on the throne. But the coup was not an immediate success. The court simply followed the order of succession, and chose Min Hla as the next king.

Not everyone was pleased. Queen Bo-Me openly questioned the court's selection of an 8-year-old boy when Prince Nyo, an accomplished military commander and senior prince with a legitimate claim to the throne—he was the eldest son of King Tarabya of Ava (r. 1400)—was available. She invited Prince of Kale to come down to Ava to claim the throne by force. Nyo marched to Ava with an army right after the rainy season was over. At Ava, Bo-Me managed to poison the boy king to death in early November 1425. The Bo-Me faction successfully placed Nyo on the throne.

== Historiography ==
The following is a list of the key events as reported in the royal chronicles.

Source	Birth–Death	Age at Accession	Reign	Length of Reign	Age at Death	Reference
Zatadawbon Yazawin (List of Kings of Ava Section)	April 1413 [sic] – 1426 [sic]	12 (13th year) [sic]	1426 [sic] – 1426 [sic] (c. April – August 1426 (implied))	4 months	12 (13th year) [sic]	(Note: Zata's List of Kings entry for Min Hla (Zata 1960: 46) says Min Hla was born on a Monday in the 2nd month of 775 ME (c. 17 April 1413). He ascended the throne in his 13th year (at age 12) in 788 ME (30 March 1426 to 29 March 1427) [sic], reigned 4 months and died in the same year of 788 ME. Since (Zata 1960: 46) also says Min Hla's successor reigned for 7 months in 788 ME, Min Hla must have reigned early in 788 ME (c. April – August 1426). The birth year of 775 ME is probably a typographical error of 778 ME since Burmese numerals 5 (၅) and 8 (၈) can easily be miscopied.)
Zatadawbon Yazawin (Horoscopes Section)	c. 18 April 1412 – 1425	12 (13th year) [sic]	1425 [sic] – 1425 [sic]	4 months	12 (13th year) [sic]	(Note: The Horoscopes Section (Zata 1960: 74): Min Hla was born on Monday, 11th nekkhat of 2nd month (Kason) of 774 ME (c. 18 April 1412). He ascended the throne in his 13th year (at age 12), and reigned four months.)
Maha Yazawin	c. 1417 – November 1425	8 (9th year)	August – November 1425	3 months	8 (9th year)	(Note: (Maha Yazawin Vol. 2 2006: 59–60): Min Hla, a Monday born, ascended the throne at age 8 (in his 9th year) in Tawthalin 787 ME (13 August 1425 to 11 September 1425). He reigned three months, and died at age 8 (9th year) in Tazaungmon 787 ME (11 October 1425 to 9 November 1425). Maha Yazawin is internally consistent. (Maha Yazawin Vol. 2 2006: 54) says his parents Thihathu and Saw Min Hla were wedded in 779 ME (30 March 1417 to 29 March 1418) which means the earliest birth year would have been 1418. (Yazawin Thit Vol. 1 2012: 264) corrects it to 778 ME (30 March 1416 to 29 March 1417). (Hmannan Vol. 2 2003: 50) accepts Yazawin Thit's correction.)
Yazawin Thit	c. 1417 – November 1425	8 (9th year)	August – November 1425	3 months	8 (9th year)	(Note: (Yazawin Thit Vol. 1 2012: 270): Min Hla, a Monday born, ascended the throne at age 8 (in his 9th year) in Tawthalin 787 ME (13 August 1425 to 11 September 1425). He reigned three months, and died at age 8 (9th year) in Tazaungmon 787 ME (11 October 1425 to 9 November 1425).)
Hmannan Yazawin	c. 1417 – November 1425	8 (9th year)	August – November 1425	3 months	8 (9th year)	(Note: (Hmannan Vol. 2 2003: 58): Min Hla, a Monday born, ascended the throne at age 8 (in his 9th year) in Tawthalin 787 ME (13 August 1425 to 11 September 1425). He reigned three months, and died at age 8 (9th year) in Tazaungmon 787 ME (11 October 1425 to 9 November 1425).)

== Ancestry ==
Ancestry of King Min Hla of Ava

8. Swa Saw Ke
4. Minkhaung I
9. Saw Beza
2. Thihathu of Ava
10. Tho Ngan Bwa of Mohnyin
5. Shin Mi-Nauk of Mohnyin
11. unnamed
1. Min Hla
12. unnamed
6. Tarabya I of Pakhan
13. unnamed
3. Saw Min Hla
14. unnamed
7. unnamed
15. unnamed

== Bibliography ==
- Harvey, G. E. (1925). History of Burma: From the Earliest Times to 10 March 1824. London: Frank Cass & Co. Ltd.
- Kala, U (2006) [1724]. Maha Yazawin (in Burmese). Vol. 1–3 (4th printing ed.). Yangon: Ya-Pyei Publishing.
- Maha Sithu (2012) [1798]. Myint Swe; Kyaw Win; Thein Hlaing (eds.). Yazawin Thit (in Burmese). Vol. 1–3 (2nd printing ed.). Yangon: Ya-Pyei Publishing.
- Royal Historians of Burma (1960) [c. 1680]. U Hla Tin (Hla Thamein) (ed.). Zatadawbon Yazawin (in Burmese). Historical Research Directorate of the Union of Burma.
- Royal Historical Commission of Burma (2003) [1832]. Hmannan Yazawin (in Burmese). Vol. 1–3. Yangon: Ministry of Information, Myanmar.

Min Hla of Ava Ava Kingdom Born: c. 26 April 1417 Died: by 9 November 1425
Regnal titles
Preceded by Thihathu	King of Ava; August – November 1425	Succeeded by Kale Kye-Taung Nyo
Royal titles
Preceded by Thihathu	Heir to the Burmese Throne c. October 1421 – August 1425	Succeeded by Minye Kyawswa I of Ava
