= Soe Min Hteik-Tin of Toungoo =

Soe Min Hteik-Tin စိုးမင်းထိပ်တင်

Chief queen consort of Toungoo Dynasty
- Tenure: 16 October 1510 – 24 November 1530
- Coronation: 11 April 1511
- Predecessor: New office
- Successor: Dhamma Dewi

Chief vicereine of Toungoo
- Tenure: c. April 1485 – 16 October 1510
- Predecessor: Min Hla Myat
- Successor: Sister of Shin Myo Myat
- Born: c. 1460s Toungoo (Taungoo)
- Died: c. 1530s Toungoo
- Spouse: Mingyi Nyo
- Issue: one daughter
- House: Toungoo
- Father: Min Sithu
- Mother: Min Hla Myat
- Religion: Theravada Buddhism

Soe Min Hteik-Tin (Burmese: စိုးမင်းထိပ်တင်, pronounced [só mɪ́ɴ tʰeiʔ tɪ̀ɴ]) was the chief queen consort of Toungoo from 1510 to 1530. Her reign title was Thiri Atula Maha Nanda Dewi. She was a daughter of Viceroy Min Sithu of Toungoo. In 1485, her first cousin Mingyi Nyo assassinated her father because he had refused give her in marriage to Nyo. She became the chief queen consort in 1510 when Nyo declared independence from Ava (Inwa). On 11 April 1511, at the coronation ceremony, she was crowned the chief queen with the title Thiri Atula Maha Nanda Dewi (Pali: Siriatulamahānandādevī)).

The queen had a daughter, who was married to Shwe Myat, son of the Lord of Taungdwin. (Note: Chronicles are inconsistent about the date of the marriage. (Hmannan Vol. 2 2003: 121) says the marriage occurred in Tabaung 863 ME (6 February to 7 March 1502). But (Hmannan Vol. 2 2003: 178–179) gives 871 ME (30 March 1509 to 30 March 1510).)

== Ancestry ==
The following is the family tree of Queen Soe Min, according to the royal chronicles. Her parents were first cousins, both descended from the Ava royalty. Her great grandfathers Minye Kyawswa (of the Forty Years' War fame) and Sithu of Paukmyaing were grandsons of King Swa Saw Ke of Ava.

Ancestry of Queen Soe Min Hteik-Tin

8. Sithu of Paukmyaing
4. Sithu Kyawhtin of Toungoo
9. (unnamed)
2. Min Sithu of Toungoo
10. Minye Kyawswa of Ava
5. Min Hla Htut of Pyakaung
11. Saw Min Hla
1. Soe Min Hteik-Tin
12. Sithu of Paukmyaing
6. Sithu of Yamethin
13. (unnamed)
3. Min Hla Myat of Yamethin
14. Myauk-Bet Nawrahta
7. (unnamed)
15. Min Shwe Kyu

== Bibliography ==
- Royal Historical Commission of Burma (1832). Hmannan Yazawin (in Burmese). Vol. 1–3 (2003 ed.). Yangon: Ministry of Information, Myanmar.
- Sein Lwin Lay, Kahtika U (1968). Mintaya Shwe Hti and Bayinnaung: Ketumadi Taungoo Yazawin (in Burmese) (2006, 2nd printing ed.). Yangon: Yan Aung Sarpay.

Soe Min Hteik-Tin of Toungoo Toungoo Dynasty Born: c. 1460s Died: c. 1530s
Royal titles
New title	Chief queen consort of Toungoo; 16 October 1510 – 24 November 1530	Succeeded by Dhamma Dewi
Preceded by Min Hla Myat	Chief vicereine of Toungoo c. April 1485 – 16 October 1510	Succeeded by sister of Shin Myo Myat
