= Anawrahta (disambiguation) =

Anawrahta (1014–1077) was the founder of the Pagan Empire.

Anawrahta or Nawrahta may refer to:

== People ==
- Anawrahta I of Sagaing (1313–1339), or Shwetaungtet, king of Sagaing 1335/36 – 1339
- Anawrahta II of Sagaing (1326–1349), or Nawrahta Minye, king of Sagaing for seven months in 1349
- Bayinnaung Kyawhtin Nawrahta (1516–1581), king of the Toungoo Dynasty of Burma 1550–1581
- Nawrahta of Mrauk-U, king of the Mrauk-U Dynasty of Arakan for a few days in 1696
- Anawrahta of Launggyet, king of Arakan 1406–1408
- Nawrahta of Kanni (born c. 1300s), senior Myinsaing prince
- Anawrahta of Tharrawaddy (d. 1446), Hanthawaddy vassal governor of Tharrawaddy and Paungde (r. 1427–1446)
- Nawrahta Minsaw or Anawrahta Minsaw, (1551/52–1607/08), king of Lan Na 1579 – 1607/08
- Maha Nawrahta (died 1767), Konbaung-era general
- Minkhaung Nawrahta (1714–1760), Konbaung-era general
- Ne Myo Nawrahta (fl. 1752–1757), Konbaung-era general and first mayor of Yangon

== Other uses ==
- Anawrahta-class corvette, a class of corvettes operated by the Myanmar Navy
- Shwe Nawrahta, in the Burmese pantheon of nats
- Anawrahta Bridge, over the Ayeyawady River in Myanmar

== See also ==
- Burmese royal titles
- Aniruddha, character in the ancient Indian epic Mahabharata, etymon of the Burmese name
