= Maung Minbyu =

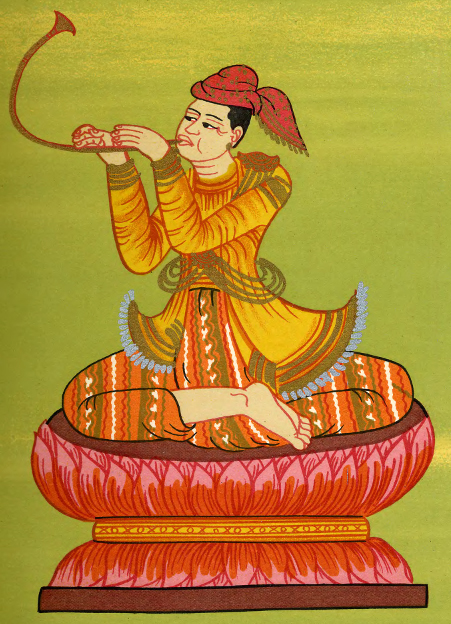
Maung Minbyu Nat

Maung Minbyu (Burmese: မောင်မင်းဖြူ [màʊɰ̃ mɪ́ɰ̃ bjù]), also known as Min Phyu or Minye Kyawswa, is one of the 37 official nats in the Burmese pantheon of spirits.

== Historical background ==
Maung Minbyu is identified with several legendary and historical figures. One account says he was a prince of Ava who died from the overuse of opium. Another version claims that he was the reincarnation of Bawlawkyantaw, the son of King Razadarit of Hanthawaddy, who was executed by his father when he was around seven years old.

Most notably, he is associated with Crown Prince Minye Kyawswa, the son of King Minkhaung I of Ava and Princess Shin Min Neng of Maw. In his previous life, it is said that he was the son of Raja Dhiyaraj of Hanthawaddy. After being killed by his father for displaying martial prowess too early in life, he was believed to have prayed at the Shwe Maw Daw Pagoda to be reborn as the prince of Inwa to take revenge against Raja Dhiyaraj.

== Life and military campaigns ==
According to chronicles, his mother, while pregnant, craved soil from Hanthawaddy, mangoes from Mottama, and cold water from Pyin Salai Island—interpreted as omens of his reincarnation. He was born and named Min Phyu (Minbyu). Even as a child, he was said to be restless and destined for war.

When his father ascended the throne as Min Khaung, he was titled Minye Kyawswa. His mother had earlier been captured during a war and taken to Hanthawaddy. At the age of 17, Minye Kyawswa requested to lead a military expedition and marched south with a massive army. Unable to conquer Hanthawaddy, he turned west and conquered Rakhine, then returned to Ava and led a campaign to the Shan State and attacked Sini. He also led a large naval fleet in support of his father.

== Death in battle ==
In 1415, during the Forty Years' War, Minye Kyawswa set up camp near the Hanthawaddy region. When he learned that Raja Dhiyaraj had abdicated in favor of his son Banya Jian and fled to Mottama, he took the title Paurisath and pursued him. Eventually, Raja Dhiyaraj returned with the new title Banya Thit Tashon and challenged Minye Kyawswa to a duel on elephants.

Despite his astrologers' warnings, and intoxicated from drinking, Minye Kyawswa accepted the challenge. During the battle, he was thrown from his elephant and suffered fatal injuries. Although Raja Dhiyaraj offered him marriage to his daughter and succession to the throne, Minye Kyawswa refused. He later died from his wounds under a tree in Dala.

== Deification ==
Following his death, Maung Minbyu (Minye Kyawswa) was deified and became one of the 37 nats officially recognized in Burmese spiritual traditions. He is venerated for his bravery and is regarded as one of the greatest warriors in Myanmar's history.
