= Sithu Kyawhtin (disambiguation) =

Sithu Kyawhtin is a Burmese royal title used in the days of Burmese monarchy.

- Sithu Kyawhtin of Toungoo: General of Ava Kingdom and governor of Toungoo (r. 1470–1481)
- Sithu Kyawhtin: King of Ava (r. 1552–1555)
