= Minye Kyawhtin (disambiguation) =

Minye Kyawhtin (also transliterated as Minyekyawdin) was a Burmese royal title, and usually refers to King Minye Kyawhtin of Toungoo Dynasty (r. 1673–1698).

Other people who wore the title were:

- Minye Kyawhtin of Pakhan: Gov. of Pakhan (r. 1413–1426)
- Minye Kyawhtin of Toungoo: King of Toungoo (r. 1452–1459)
- Minye Kyawhtin of Tharrawaddy: Later known as King Minye Thihathu II of Toungoo (r. 1597–1609)
