= Min Sithu of Toungoo =

Burmese Author

Min Sithu မင်းစည်သူ

Viceroy of Toungoo
- Reign: 1481 – 1485
- Predecessor: Sithu Kyawhtin of Toungoo
- Successor: Mingyi Nyo
- Born: c. 1430s Ava (Inwa)?
- Died: c. April 1485; Toungoo (Taungoo)
- Burial: Toungoo
- Spouse: Min Hla Myat
- Issue: Soe Min Hteik-Tin (daughter); Uzana (son); Min Hla (son)
- House: Toungoo
- Father: Sithu Kyawhtin
- Mother: Min Hla Htut
- Religion: Theravada Buddhism

Min Sithu (Burmese: မင်းစည်သူ, pronounced [mɪ́ɰ̃ sìθù]; also Sithu Nge; died 1485) was Viceroy of Toungoo from 1481 to 1485.

He inherited the viceroyship after his father Sithu Kyawhtin of Toungoo was killed in battle in 1481. He was killed by his nephew Mingyi Nyo. The viceroy had repeatedly refused the nephew's requests to marry his daughter Soe Min (Mingyi Nyo's first cousin). He was a grandson of Crown Prince Minye Kyawswa of Ava.

== Bibliography ==
- Royal Historical Commission of Burma (1832). Hmannan Yazawin (in Burmese). Vol. 1–3 (2003 ed.). Yangon: Ministry of Information, Myanmar.

Min Sithu of Toungoo Ava Kingdom Born: c. 1430s Died: c. April 1485
Royal titles
| Preceded by Sithu Kyawhtin | Viceroy of Toungoo; 1481 – 1485 | Succeeded by Mingyi Nyo |
