= Shwe Nawrahta =

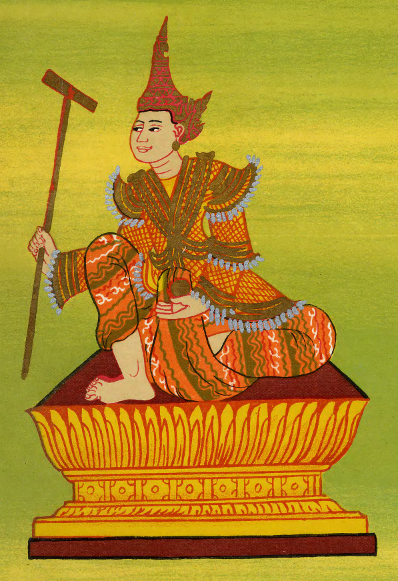
Shwe Nawrahta nat

Shwe Nawrahta (ရွှေနော်ရထာ, pronounced [ʃwè nɔ̀jətʰà]) is one of the 37 nats in the Burmese pantheon of nats. He is the merged personalities of two historic Nawrahtas. The first source is Anawrahta of Launggyet, son in law of King Minkhaung I of Ava. Anawrahta was appointed governor of Arakan in 1406, and later married to the king's daughter Saw Pyei Chantha. In April 1408, Razadarit's Hanthawaddy troops captured Launggyet (Arakan's then capital), and took Anawrahta and Saw Pyei Chantha prisoner to Pathein. On arrival, Anawrahta was executed, and his wife passed into Razadarit's harem as a full queen. The second source is Nawrahta of Yamethin, grandson of King Minkhaung II of Ava and the eldest son of King Thihathura. In November 1501 (Nadaw 863 ME, 10 November to 8 December 1501), he ordered his servant Nga Thaukkya to assassinate the new king Shwenankyawshin. Thaukkya's attempt failed; he was caught and put to death. Nawrahta lived in the palace so he was easily caught; being of royal blood, he was drowned.

Shwe Nawrahta is portrayed sitting with one knee raised upon a simple throne, holding a gu lee ball in one hand and a gu lee stick in the other.

== Bibliography ==
- Harvey, G. E. (1925). History of Burma: From the Earliest Times to 10 March 1824. London: Frank Cass & Co. Ltd.
- Royal Historical Commission of Burma (1832). Hmannan Yazawin (in Burmese). Vol. 1–3 (2003 ed.). Yangon: Ministry of Information, Myanmar.
- Hla Thamein. "Thirty-Seven Nats". Yangonow. Archived from the original on 2006-06-24.
- Khin Maung Nyunt. "The Equestrian Festival". myanmars.net.
