= Min Hla Htut of Pyakaung =

Min Hla Htut of Pyakaung ပြကောင်း မင်းသမီး မင်းလှထွတ် Princess of Pyakaung

Queen consort of Toungoo
- Reign: 1470 – 1481
- Successor: Min Hla Myat
- Born: early 1410s (Note: (Hmannan Vol. 2 2003: 21): Her elder brother Minye Kyawhtin was born in 770 ME (28 March 1408 to 27 March 1409), meaning she could have been as early as 1409. She had two younger siblings, the last of whom was born in 776 ME (1414/15) per (Hmannan Vol. 2 2003: 54).); Ava (Inwa)
- Died: c. 1480s? Toungoo (Taungoo)
- Spouse: Sithu Kyawhtin of Toungoo
- Issue: Min Sithu (son); Min Hla Nyet (daughter); Min Htwe (son)
- House: Ava
- Father: Minye Kyawswa
- Mother: Saw Min Hla
- Religion: Theravada Buddhism

Min Hla Htut of Pyakaung (Burmese: ပြကောင်း မင်းသမီး မင်းလှထွတ်, pronounced [mɪ́ɴ l̥a̰ tʰʊʔ]) was the chief queen of Viceroy Sithu Kyawhtin of Toungoo (r. 1470–1481).

== Brief ==
In her youth, the eldest daughter of Crown Prince Minye Kyawswa and Saw Min Hla, was known as the Princess of Pyakaung. She was later married to Sithu Kyawhtin, a member of Ava royalty. (Note: Both standard chronicles Maha Yazawin (Maha Yazawin Vol. 2 2006: ) and Hmannan Yazawin (Hmannan Vol. 2 2003: 54) in the chapter of Ava Kingdom say that Princess of Pyakaung, daughter of Minye Kyawswa and Saw Min Hla married Sithu Kyawhtin of Toungoo. But in describing King Mingyi Nyo's ancestry, Maha Yazawin (Maha Yazawin Vol. 2 2006: 130) says Min Hla Htut was daughter of Pyakaung Mingyi. Hmannan (Hmannan Vol. 2 2003: 173) corrects it as she was the Princess of Pyakaung.)

The princess had two sons and a daughter: Min Sithu, Min Hla Nyet and Min Htwe. In 1470, she and the family moved to Toungoo after her husband was appointed governor of the rebellion-prone vassal state of Ava. Her elder brother Minye Kyawhtin of Toungoo had raised a rebellion there from 1451 to 1459. The future founders of Toungoo Dynasty descended from her. She was the maternal grandmother of King Mingyi Nyo, who broke away from Ava in 1510, and a maternal great-grandmother of King Tabinshwehti who founded the Toungoo Empire.

== Ancestry ==
The princess was descended from Ava and Pagan royal lines from her father's side.

Ancestry of Min Hla Htut

8. Swa Saw Ke of Ava
4. Minkhaung I of Ava
9. Saw Beza
2. Minye Kyawswa
10. Tho Ngan Bwa of Mohnyin
5. Shin Mi-Nauk
11. unnamed
1. Min Hla Htut
12. unnamed
6. Tarabya I of Pakhan
13. unnamed
3. Saw Min Hla
14. unnamed
7. unnamed
15. unnamed

== Bibliography ==
- Kala, U (1724). Maha Yazawin (in Burmese). Vol. 1–3 (2006, 4th printing ed.). Yangon: Ya-Pyei Publishing.
- Royal Historical Commission of Burma (1832). Hmannan Yazawin (in Burmese). Vol. 1–3 (2003 ed.). Yangon: Ministry of Information, Myanmar.
- Sein Lwin Lay, Kahtika U (1968). Mintaya Shwe Hti and Bayinnaung: Ketumadi Taungoo Yazawin (in Burmese) (2006, 2nd printing ed.). Yangon: Yan Aung Sarpay.

Min Hla Htut of Pyakaung Ava Kingdom Born: 1410s Died: 1480s?
Royal titles
| Preceded by | Queen consort of Toungoo; 1470 – 1481 | Succeeded by Min Hla Myat |
