= Minye Kyawswa =

Crown Prince of Ava from 1406 to 1415

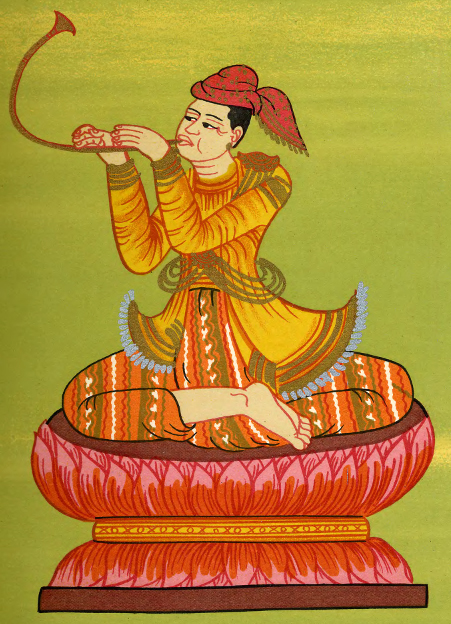
- Minye Kyawswa represented as the Maung Minbyu nat

Heir Apparent of Ava
- Reign: c. December 1406 – 13 March 1415
- Predecessor: Theiddat (Heir Presumptive)
- Successor: Thihathu

Viceroy of Prome
- Reign: c. July 1413 – November 1413
- Predecessor: Sokkate of Prome (Acting Governor)
- Successor: Thihathu
- Born: c. January 1391; Saturday, c. Tabodwe 752 ME; Pyinzi, Ava Kingdom
- Died: 13 March 1415 (aged 24); Wednesday, 4th waxing of Late Tagu 776 ME; Twante–Dala, Hanthawaddy Kingdom
- Burial: Twante–Dala
- Spouse: Saw Min Hla (1406–1415)
- Issue Detail: Minye Kyawhtin of Toungoo; Min Hla Htut of Pyakaung; Minye Aung Naing; Saw Min Phyu
- Burmese: မင်းရဲကျော်စွာ
- House: Ava
- Father: Minkhaung I
- Mother: Shin Mi-Nauk
- Religion: Theravada Buddhism

Minye Kyawswa (Burmese: မင်းရဲကျော်စွာ, pronounced [mɪ́ɰ̃jɛ́ tɕɔ̀zwà]; also Minyekyawswa and Minrekyawswa; c. January 1391 – 13 March 1415) was crown prince of Ava from 1406 to 1415, and commander-in-chief of Ava's military from 1410 to 1415. He is best remembered in Burmese history as the courageous general who waged the fiercest battles of the Forty Years' War (1385–1424) against King Razadarit of Hanthawaddy Pegu.

The prince was his father King Minkhaung I's best and most trusted general. Between 1406 and 1415, the father and son team waged war on all of Ava's neighbors, and nearly succeeded in reassembling the Pagan Empire under Ava's leadership. On the cusp of final victory, he was wounded in a battle near Twante–Dala, and captured in March 1415. The crown prince of Ava refused treatment, and died shortly after. He was 24.

Minkhaung and Minye Kyawswa's struggles against Razadarit are retold as classic stories of legend in Burmese popular culture. Minye Kyawswa's name is still invoked alongside the names of greatest warrior kings of Burmese history. He has also entered the pantheon of Burmese nats (spirits) as Maung Minbyu as well as Min Kyawzwa in some versions.

== Early life ==
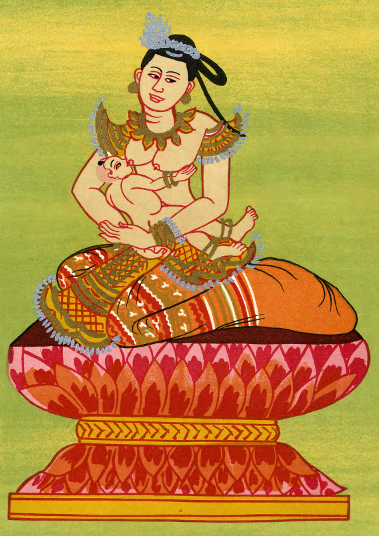
Minye Kyawswa's mother Queen Shin Mi-Nauk represented as the Anauk Mibaya nat

Born Min Phyu (မင်းဖြူ, [mɪ́ɰ̃ bjù]) c. January 1391, (Note: Born about nine months after the death of Prince Bawlawkyantaw in early 752 ME (c. April 1390), or late 751 ME (c. March 1390)) the future prince was the first child of Prince Min Swe of Pyinzi and his first wife Shin Mi-Nauk. His father was a son of then King Swa Saw Ke of Ava while his mother was a daughter of Sawbwa (Chief) Tho Ngan Bwa of Mohnyin. Min Swe and Mi-Nauk had been wedded in a marriage of state in 1389/90 during a brief respite of hostilities between Ava and Mohnyin.

According to the royal chronicles, Phyu had already gained notoriety before his birth, which came near the end of the first phase of the Forty Years' War between Ava and Hanthawaddy Pegu. Ava and Pegu courts believed that he was the reincarnation of Prince Baw Law Kyan Daw of Hanthawaddy, who was executed on the orders of his father King Razadarit for suspicion of treason c. April 1390. The prince is said to have sworn an oath before taking the poison that if he were innocent, he was to be reborn in the dynasty of Ava kings, and be the scourge of Peguans. Chronicles continue that about three to four months after the prince's death, Mi-Nauk became known to be pregnant, and she longed for three types of delicacies from the south. (Note: (Yazawin Thit Vol. 1 2012: 202): The delicacies were: mangoes from Dala, water from Punsalaing (near Bilu Island where five rivers meet and considered sacred water), and the earth from Martaban (Mottama).) Though Ava and Pegu were at war, Minkhaung asked Razadarit to deliver the food. In the superstitious world of Burmese politics, Razadarit believed that the unborn child must be Baw Law Kyan Daw himself taking flesh again according to his dying prayer. The Hanthawaddy king, on the advice of his superstitious court, sent the mangoes but substituted sacred water and earth with water and earth bewitched by yadaya rituals.

Phyu had a younger sister Saw Pyei Chantha, and two younger brothers Thihathu and Min Nyo. The siblings grew up in Pyinzi, 60 km south of the capital Ava (Inwa), until 1400. On 25 November 1400, their father ascended the Ava throne, with the title of Minkhaung, and the family moved to Ava.

== Early Ava years (1400–1410) ==
=== Arakan (1406) ===
Initially, Phyu was not yet the heir-apparent. Minkhaung's second-in-command in the early years (1400–1403) was his younger brother Theiddat, who was instrumental in Minkhaung getting and keeping the throne. (Note: (Hmannan Vol. 1 2003: 438–439): It was Theiddat who had urged Minkhaung to fight for the throne, and ambushed Minkhaung's rival Gov. Maha Pyauk of Yamethin. (Yazawin Thit Vol. 1 2012: 223): The brothers also had to fight off Razadarit's invasion in 1401–1403.) But Phyu was to take on increasingly more important roles. The main chronicles say Phyu, styled as Minye Kyawswa, was given command of the Arakan campaign before he turned 12 (c. late 1402 to early 1403). However, the Arakan invasion took place in November 1406; (Note: Standard chronicles (Maha Yazawin Vol. 1 2006: 309) and (Hmannan Vol. 1 2003: 444) say that Minye Kyawswa was about to enter his 13th year (i.e. about to turn 12 but still 11 years old) when he was first given command of an army for the Arakan campaign. Per Rakhine Razawin Thit (RRT Vol. 2 1999: 9) says the Minye Kyawswa invaded Arakan in November 1406.) if he did begin military service before turning 12 as the chronicles say, then it must have been towards the end of Razadarit's invasion—i.e. c. late 1402. (Note: Chronicles Maha Yazawin (Maha Yazawin Vol. 1 2006: 311–326) and Hmannan Yazawin (Hmannan Vol. 1 2003: 446–466) say the invasion took place in 1404–06. But Yazawin Thit (Yazawin Thit Vol. 1 2012: 223) cites a contemporary inscription saying Ava was already at war with Pegu in 1402. Furthermore per (Yazawin Thit Vol. 1 2012: 220–221), truce negotiations began c. 5 January 1403 about ten days after Ava forces defeated Pegu forces near Prome on 26 December 1402 (Tuesday, 3rd waxing of Tabodwe 764 ME).)

Though he may have also taken part in his father's 1404–1406 acquisition spree that pulled the nearer Shan states of Nyaungshwe, Bhamo, and Mohnyin into Ava's orbit, the prince's first confirmed campaign came in 1406. That year, Minkhaung asked his eldest son to lead the army to acquire Arakan, the kingdom on the western coast (present-day Rakhine State), separated by the Arakan Yoma range. In November 1406, the 15-year-old prince led the invasion force (10,000 men, 500 horses, 40 elephants) into Arakan, and advanced to the main fort guarding Launggyet. There, his senior staff advised him to retreat, citing the enemy's larger forces and their fortified positions. The prince insisted that his commanders come up with a plan of attack. The staff's plan to draw out the Arakanese forces and engage in the open field worked. On 27 November 1406, Minye Kyawswa on his war elephant, Ye Myat Swa, led the charge against the opposing forces. Though the Ava forces were outnumbered, they managed to kill the Arakanese general after which Arakanese defenses collapsed. On 29 November 1406, (Note: (RRT Vol. 2 1999: 9): Monday, 5th waning of Nadaw 768 ME = Monday, 29 November 1406.) Ava forces took Launggyet, and Min Saw Mon fled to Bengal.

=== Heir-apparent ===
The victory marked the prince's coming of age. His father appointed Gov. Anawrahta of Kalay king of Arakan, and recalled Minye Kyawswa to Ava. At Ava, the king made his eldest son crown prince, (Note: Chronicles do not agree on when he became crown prince. Maha Yazawin says he was appointed crown prince in late 773 ME (early 1412). But Yazawin Thit corrects Maha Yazawin, saying the appointment came in 768 (1406/07); Hmannan Yazawin accepts Yazawin Thit's account.) and married him to Saw Min Hla, a cousin of the groom.

Minkhaung's actions had consequences. In 1407, Minkhaung's brother Theiddat, unhappy with being passed over, defected to Pegu. Theiddat was welcomed by Razadarit, who had concluded that he could not get Ava to become too strong. In January 1408, Razadarit broke the truce, and ordered an invasion of Arakan; his forces took Launggyet in March 1408. (Note: (Yazawin Thit Vol. 1 2012: 228): Razadarit made the decision to invade Arakan in Tabodwe 967 ME (28 December 1407 to 25 January 1408) after a prayer service at the Mya Thi-Tin Pagoda. His forces took Launggyet in Late Tagu 967 ME (25 February 1408 to 24 March 1408).) Razadarit had Anawrahta executed, and took Anawrahta's wife and Minye Kyawswa's sister, Saw Pyei Chantha, as his queen. Both Minkhaung and Minye Kyawswa were incensed. But Minkhaung's ill-conceived invasions of the south in 1408 and 1409–10 were soundly defeated by Razadarit. In 1408, Hanthawaddy forces captured Queen Mi-Nauk, and Razadarit raised her as his queen.

After the two disastrous defeats, Minye Kyawswa asked for, and received the command of the army from a dejected Minkhaung. Until this point, the crown prince had not been actively involved with the war. (Note: (Fernquest Autumn 2006: 52): According to the Hsenwi Yazawin, "King" Minye Kyawswa of Ava in league with King of Pagan attacked Hsenwi (Theinni) territory in 1409/10. According to the standard royal chronicles, Minye Kyawswa's first clash with Hsenwi came two years later in 1411.) His responsibility had been to guard Ava while his father campaigned in the south. He was now totally obsessed with taking on Razadarit, who had taken both his sister and mother.

== Commander-in-chief ==
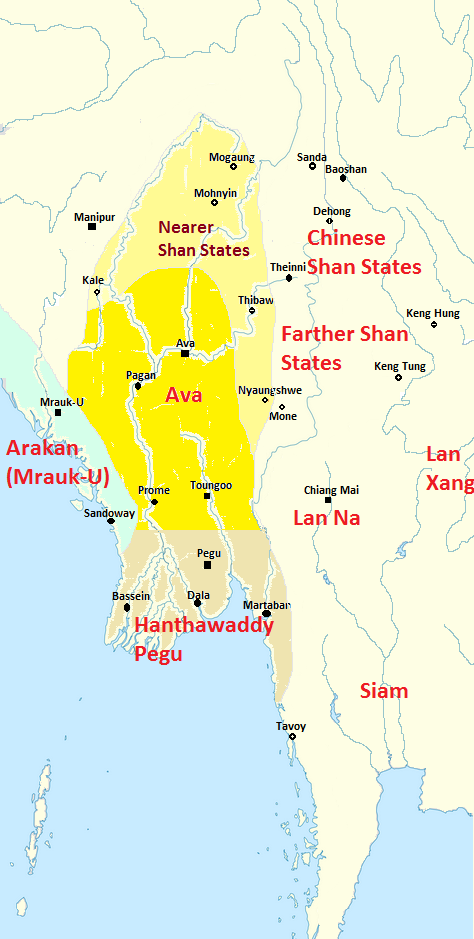
Political map of Burma in the 15th century

Between 1410 and 1415, Minye Kyawswa would bring war to all of Ava's enemies with increased vigor. He nearly succeeded in defeating Pegu, and Ava would not see a similar degree of military success again.

=== Irrawaddy delta (1410–1411) ===
His first change as commander-in-chief was to alter Ava's usual battle plan. Instead of directly attacking the well-defended Pegu capital region, he would attack what he believed was the less defended Irrawaddy delta. In late 1410, the prince invaded the delta by river and land with an army (7000 men, 600 horses, and 40 elephants) and a navy that transported 7000 men. Combined Ava forces proceeded to attack the key delta cities of Myaungmya and Bassein (Pathein). But the cities were well fortified and prepared for long sieges, and he decided to retreat to Prome (Pyay).

=== Arakan (1411–1412) ===
The prince was not prepared to go home empty handed. He regrouped and invaded Arakan in early 1411. He drove out Pegu-installed vassals. He appointed Letya as governor of Launggyet in North Arakan and Sokkate as governor of Sandoway (Thandwe) in South Arakan, and returned to Ava.

But the crown prince was back soon after. Right after the rainy season, two Hanthawaddy armies from the delta invaded Arakan. The Ava garrison at Sandoway fell before Ava reinforcements (8000 troops, 300 horses, 30 elephants) led by Minye Kyawswa arrived. Ava forces laid siege to the city for the next three months. But they had to retreat in early 1412 when Minkhaung recalled the troops to defend against Hanthawaddy's ally Hsenwi (Theinni), which had opened a new front by invading Ava territory in the north.

After the Ava troops had left, Razadarit sent reinforcements to Sandoway. Reinforced Hanthawaddy troops then marched to Launggyet, and drove out the Ava garrison led by Letya and Sokkate. Arakan would remain a Hanthawaddy vassal at least until Razadarit's death.

=== Hsenwi (1412) ===
Back at Ava, Minye Kyawswa took command of a new army (7000 troops, 300 horses, 20 elephants), and immediately marched to the front. His mission was to defend the nearer Shan states which Ava had annexed early in Minkhaung's reign (1404–1406). The powerful Shan state of Hsenwi had been concerned about the annexations. Hsenwi had received its overlord Ming China's authorization to retaliate against Ava's annexation of Mohnyin. It likely shared a common cause with Hanthawaddy in preventing Ava from getting too strong as it became an ally with Pegu a year later.

Minye Kyawswa's army intercepted the Hsenwi army near Wetwin (near Pyin Oo Lwin), and defeated the intruders. The sawbwa of Hsenwi fell in action, and 800 troops, 200 horses and six elephants were captured. The prince then chased the enemy all the way to Hsenwi, and laid siege to the city. The defenders held out for Chinese reinforcements from Yunnan to arrive. Five months into the siege, towards the end of the rainy season, a Chinese force of 20,000 men and 2000 cavalry approached. Minye Kyawswa moved four regiments (4000 men, 300 horses, 20 elephants) of the army near the Sinkhan forest outside the city. The Ava army then ambushed the larger Chinese army as they came out of the forest. The Chinese army was driven back. Five Chinese commanders, 2000 troops and 1000 horses were taken prisoner. The siege lasted one more month until c. November 1412 when Minkhaung called back Minye Kyawswa in order to face off Razadarit who had just reopened the southern front by attacking Prome. (Note: (Pan Hla 2005: 278): In Binnya Dala's Burmese language version of the Razadarit Ayedawbon chronicle, Minkhaung marched to Prome on the 5th waxing of Nadaw 770 ME (27 November 1408) after recalling Minye Kyawswa from Hsenwi to join him in the south. The 770 ME is an error according to standard chronicles. The invasion of the south after Hsenwi should be 774 ME, according to Hmannan (Hmannan Vol. 2 2003: 8–9). Minkhaung may have marched to Prome, starting on the 5th waxing of Nadaw 774 ME (8 November 1412).)

=== Prome (1412–1413) ===
Minye Kyawswa immediately sailed down from Ava to Prome with about 5000 to 6000 troops. (Note: (Razadarit Ayedawbon 2005: 278): Minye Kyawswa sailed down with 6000 troops. (Yazawin Thit Vol. 1 2012: 239) and (Hmannan Vol. 2 2003: 9): The total invasion force was 12,000 men, 600 horses and 40 elephants of which Minkhaung commanded 7 regiments, meaning Minye Kyawswa probably commanded the remainder (about 5000 troops.)) His father had already left for Prome with an army consisted of seven regiments. When Minye Kyawswa arrived, the father and son tried to break the Hanthawaddy lines. They made no meaningful progress until after about four months when the Hanthawaddy command suddenly lost its two most senior generals. First, Gen. Byat Za, Razadarit's second-in-command, died after a long illness. Soon after, Gen. Lagun Ein was severely wounded in a naval battle, and was captured by the Ava navy. When the general soon died from wounds, Minye Kyawswa ordered the general's body sent on a raft down the Irrawaddy with full military honors. Shaken by the deaths, Razadarit hastily retreated with Hanthawaddy rearguard losing about 300 troops from Ava attacks.

=== Dagon and Dala (1413) ===
Minye Kyawswa proposed an immediate invasion of the south. Governor-general Letya Pyanchi of Prome supported the proposal. While Minkhaung was skeptical, he allowed his son to carry out the plan. In April 1413, Minye Kyawswa took eastern delta towns of Dala–Twante and Dagon. But the Ava advance was halted at the battle of Hmawbi in which Gen. Pyanchi was mortally wounded. Minkhaung ordered a pause as it was just a month away from the rainy season and the army did not have enough strength. The crown prince ignored his father's order, and resumed the march to Pegu in May 1413. (Note: (Yazawin Thit Vol. 1 2012: 244–245): Nayon 775 ME (30 April 1413 to 28 May 1413).)

But the Hanthawaddy defenses were ready for him. Minye Kyawswa's army was driven back outside Dala by three Hanthawaddy regiments led by three sons of Razadarit. (Note: The three sons, Binnya Kyan, Binnya Dhammaraza, and Binnya Bassein may have been motivated by Razadarit's famous lamentation (Hmannan Vol. 2 2003: 17) that he did not have a capable son like Minye Kyawswa.) Another Ava army led by Minye Kyawswa's father-in-law, Tarabya I of Pakhan, was also defeated at Syriam (Thanlyin). Minye Kyawswa now decided to wait out the rainy season from Prome where he took over as the acting viceroy-general. For his part, Razadarit seriously considered attacking Dala but decided to wait until after the monsoon season. Instead, the Hanthawaddy king sent emissaries to northern Shan states and Lan Na in search of alliances. (Note: Per (Fernquest Spring 2006: 18), Razadarit was allied with Hsenwi.)

=== Myedu and Maw (1413–1414) ===
Ava's northern front was never quiet after the siege of Hsenwi. According to the Ming Shilu, the Yongle Emperor ordered another attack on Ava. In 1413, while the main Ava armies were in the south, Chinese-backed Hsenwi forces raided Ava's northern territories, destroying "over 20 cities and stockades". The captured elephants, horses, and other goods were presented at the Chinese capital in September 1413. According to the Burmese chronicles, the attack on Myedu was carried out by another Shan state, Maw (Mong Mao/Mawdon Mawke). In response, Minkhaung recalled Minye Kyawswa to Ava, and sent his middle son Thihathu to Prome to take over as viceroy. The southern Ava army also evacuated Dala. At Ava, Minye Kyawswa took command of an army of 8000 troops, 400 horses and 30 elephants, and marched to Myedu. His forces defeated Maw forces at Myedu, and chased the enemy to the Chinese border.

=== Last invasion of Hanthawaddy (1414–1415) ===
==== Battle plan ====
Following the successful northern campaign, Minye Kyawswa advocated for a full-scale invasion of the south. However, Minkhaung remained cautious, given the unresolved situation in the north. The king allocated a sizable joint land and naval force for the southern campaign though it was less than Minye Kyawswa had sought. The general plan was to attack the western Irrawaddy delta (targeting Khebaung, Bassein, and Myaungmya), and then capture the southeastern delta ports of Dala and Dagon before advancing on Pegu.

Minye Kyawswa served as overall commander-in-chief, leading the main army (8000 men, 200 horses and 80 elephants). His deputy Nawrahta of Salin commanded the navy (13,000 men, 1800 ships of all sizes). Prince Thihathu commanded five marine regiments, charged with safeguarding the supply lines. Separately, a regiment led by Thinkhaya I of Toungoo guarded the Sittaung front though this sector was not part of the planned invasion.

==== Irrawaddy delta ====
Circa October 1414, (Note: The invasion took place in early or before Tazaungmon 776 ME (13 October 1414 to 11 November 1414) when Razadarit evacuated to Martaban (Mottama) per (Yazawin Thit Vol. 1 2012: 253). The dry season campaigns typically began after the end of Buddhist Lent, which usually took place at or near the end of the monsoon season. The Lent of 776 ME ended on 28 September 1414 (full moon of Thadingyut 776 ME).) Minye Kyawswa launched the invasion with a joint naval and land attack on Fort Khebaung (north of Hinthada). But Hanthawaddy troops put up a remarkable defense, inflicting heavy casualties on the invaders. After the first two attempts failed, Minye Kyawswa ordered another attack, declaring that anyone who failed to charge would be executed. Then, he on his favorite war elephant, Nga Chit Khaing, along with his elite regiment of 800 men, led the charge. The fort subsequently fell. The fall of Khebaung shocked Razadarit who had heavily invested in its defenses. He immediately sent an army to retake Khebaung, and sent another army to attack Toungoo (Taungoo). But neither attack materialized. The Hanthawaddy king evacuated to Martaban (Mottama) in October/November 1414. (Note: (Maha Yazawin Vol. 2 2006: 39) (Yazawin Thit Vol. 1 2012: 253) and (Hmannan Vol. 2 2003: 30–31): Tazaungmon 776 ME = 13 October 1414 to 11 November 1414))

Ava forces went on to swarm the delta but they could not take Bassein or Myaungmya, the two main cities at the western edge of the delta. Soon they found themselves overstretched due to constant Hanthawaddy guerrilla attacks on Ava supply lines. Nonetheless, they managed to fight off a joint land-naval attack by Hanthawaddy forces from Pegu, and captured Gen. Smin Bayan, a son-in-law of Razadarit, and 20 other senior commanders. The victory restored Ava's supply lines, and allowed the sieges of Bassein and Myaungmya to continue.

The crown prince began preparing for the next phase of the operations—drive towards Pegu itself. But he needed to convince his father first. He made a 17-day return trip to Ava, bringing with him captured Hanthawaddy commanders, including Smin Bayan. At Ava, he discussed the war situation with his father. A week later, he sailed back down, arriving five days later at the outskirts of Dala. As he expected, Bassein surrendered soon after his return from Ava, and Myaungmya followed. Now, the entire delta was under Ava control. It was c. December 1414.

==== Pegu province ====
Minye Kyawswa wrote to Minkhaung that Razadarit had not returned to Pegu, and that the time to attack was now. Minkhaung tried to dissuade his son that it might be a trap. The king ordered Viceroy Thihathu of Prome and Gov. Thado of Mohnyin to launch an attack on Fort Sayat, via Toungoo from the north. Before the attack on Sayat could be carried out, Minye Kyawswa launched an attack on both Syriam (Thanlyin) and Dagon (Yangon).

However, the planned attack on Sayat would be delayed as Chinese forces invaded from the north. Minkhaung managed to send an army which forced the Chinese army to retreat. (Note: (Fernquest Autumn 2006: 53–54): Ming records do not provide any details about the expedition. The Burmese chronicles (Hmannan Vol. 2 2003: 28–29) say that when the Ava army and the Chinese army met, both sides agreed to a duel on horseback. Smin Bayan, who had entered Ava's service, defeated the Chinese commander, after which the Chinese army retreated.) Meanwhile, Razadarit returned to Pegu in January/February 1415. (Note: (Yazawin Thit Vol. 1 2012: 253): Tabodwe 776 ME = 10 January 1415 to 7 February 1415) The Chinese threat forced Minkhaung to cut down on the size of the army to Sayat, sending just 1000 troops. After Thihathu's enfeebled attack on Sayat, Razadarit turned his attention to the Dala–Syriam theater. On 22 February 1415, the Pegu command drew up a plan to fight Minye Kyawswa; eight days later, on 2 March 1415, Razadarit himself led the army to the front. (Note: (Yazawin Thit Vol. 1 2012: 256): Full moon of Tabaung 776 ME = 22 February 1415; 8th waning of Tabaung 776 ME = 2 March 1415)

==== Battle of Dala ====
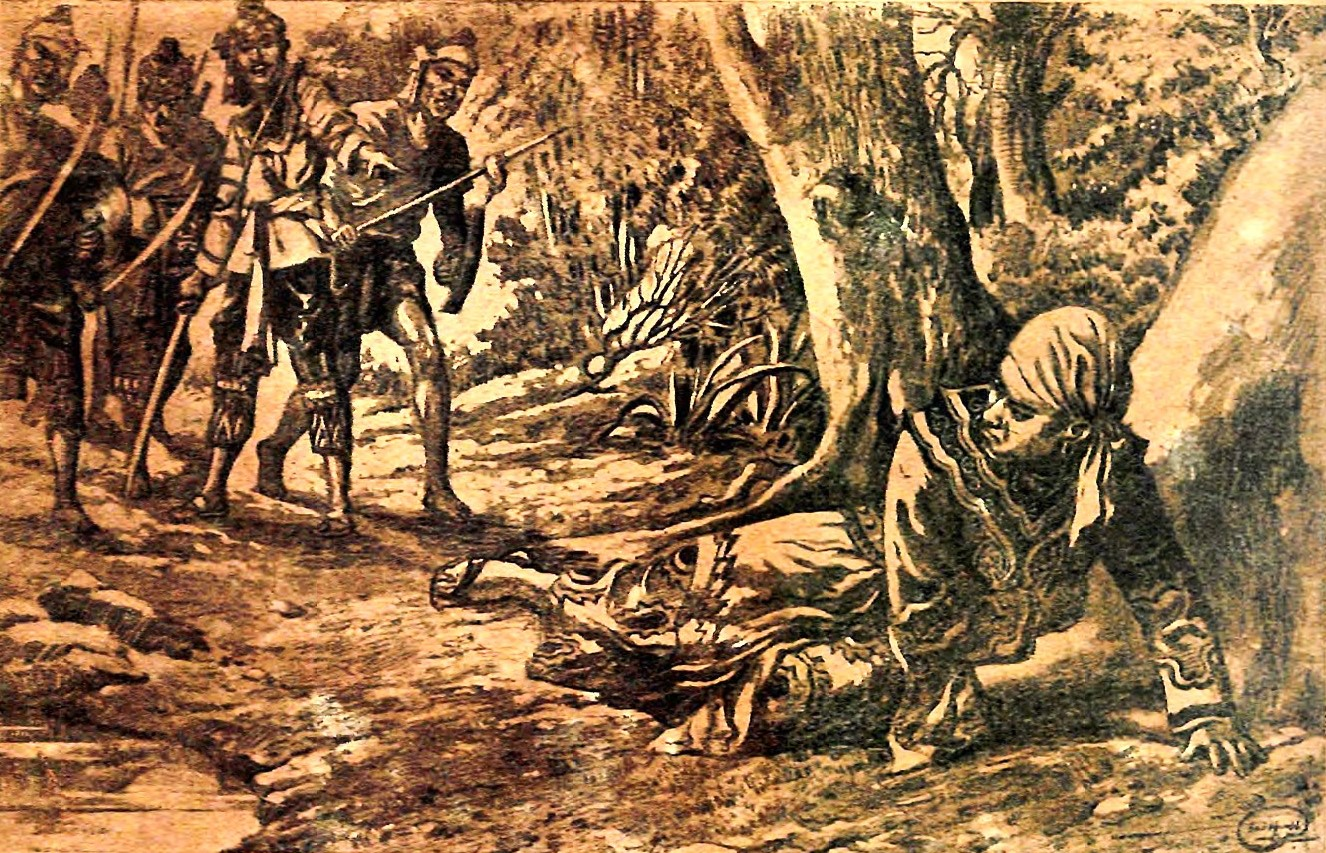
Hanthawaddy soldiers captured Minye Kyawswa after the Battle of Dala. An illustration from Rachathirat, a Thai version of Razadarit Ayedawbon, 1946 printed edition.

The Hanthawaddy command had planned to fight on the astrologically chosen date of Wednesday, 4th waxing of Late Tagu 776 ME (Wednesday, 13 March 1415). (Note: All main chronicles and the Razadarit Ayedawbon chronicle say that he died on Wednesday, 4th waxing of Late Tagu, and that the Wednesday was astrologically planned by the Hanthawaddy command. But they do not agree on the year. The Razadarit Ayedawbon (c. 1560s) (Razadarit Ayedawbon 2005: 317) says that he died in 775 ME while the first national chronicle Maha Yazawin (1724) (Maha Yazawin Vol. 2 2006: 39) says that he died in 778 ME. The Yazawin Thit chronicle (1798) corrects the prior chronicles saying that it was 776 ME. But the Hmannan Yazawin chronicle (1832) (Hmannan Vol. 2 2003: 43) keeps Maha Yazawin's 778 ME. Of all the chronicles, only Yazawin Thit's 776 ME (Yazawin Thit Vol. 1 2012: 260) correctly translates to a Wednesday date: Wednesday, 13 March 1415. The Razadarit seems to have used the start of the prince's Lower Burma campaign of 775 ME as his death year. Maha Yazawin's 778 ME appears to be a miscopying of 775 ME as Burmese numerals 5 and 8 are similar.) That day, Hanthawaddy forces led by three sons of Razadarit—Binnya Dhammaraza, Binnya Ran I and Binnya Kyan—approached modern Dala–Twante. Minye Kyawswa pulled back from his siege of Syriam to meet the enemy forces. His brother Min Nyo was his deputy. Minye Kyawswa on the back of his favorite elephant Nga Chit Khaing led the charge. He broke through several enemy lines but was soon surrounded. His elephant, which had been severely wounded, flung him off. Though heavily wounded, the crown prince of Ava refused treatment, and died shortly after. He was 24.

== Aftermath ==
Razadarit gave Minye Kyawswa a burial with full royal honors and rites. Minkhaung immediately came down with an army, and exhumed his son's body from where Razadarit had given them honorable burial. The remains were solemnly dropped into the waters near Twante. After rampaging through the delta, Minkhaung called off the invasion and left. At Ava, Minkhaung appointed Thihathu crown prince in 1415. He also married Minye Kyawswa's widow Saw Min Hla to Thihathu.

Minye Kyawswa was deeply respected by both sides for his courage. His campaigns of 1414–1415 were the culmination of Forty Years' War. After his death, the war quickly petered out. Only three more campaigns (1416–1417, 1417–1418 and 1423–1424) were fought halfheartedly by both sides. Ava's military success was mostly attributable to his inspired leadership. Ava would not see this kind of success again.

== Legacy ==
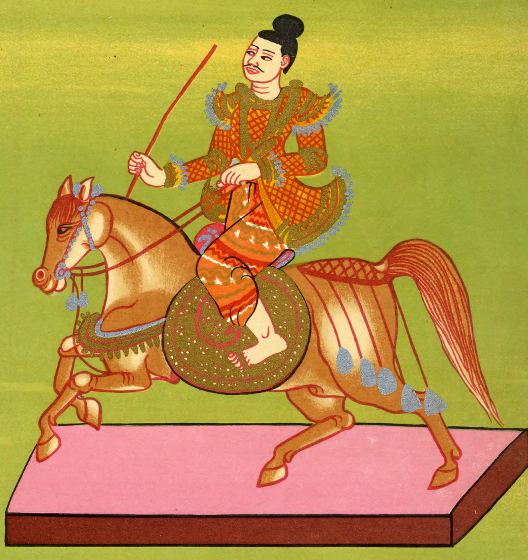
Minye Kyawswa is associated with Min Kyawzwa nat in some versions.

Minkhaung and Minye Kyawswa's struggles against Razadarit are retold as classic stories of legend in Burmese popular culture. Minye Kyawswa's name is still invoked alongside the names of greatest warrior kings of Burmese history. He then entered the pantheon of Burmese nats (spirits) as Maung Minbyu, his birth name. In some versions, he is also the Min Kyawzwa nat.

== Commemorations ==
- Minye Kyawswa Road, a road in Yangon

== Family ==
Minye Kyawswa was married to Saw Min Hla, who gave birth to four children.

Issue	Birth–Death	Notes
Minye Kyawhtin of Toungoo	1408–1459	Rebel "King" of Toungoo (r. 1452–59)
Min Hla Htut of Pyakaung	c. 1410–?	Wife of Viceroy Sithu Kyawhtin of Toungoo; Grandmother of King Mingyi Nyo of Toungoo Dynasty
Minye Aung Naing	c. 1412–?	
Saw Min Phyu	1415–?	Third wife of Gov. Saw Shwe Khet of Prome and Tharrawaddy; Grandmother of King Bayin Htwe of Prome

== Historiography ==
The royal chronicles do not necessarily agree on his birth and death dates as well as his term as heir-apparent.

Source	Birth–Death	Age	As Crown Prince	Reference
Razadarit Ayedawbon	c. early 1391 – 24 March 1414 [sic]	24 (25th year [sic])	not mentioned	(Note: The Razadarit's reporting about Minye Kyawswa's age is inconsistent. It says Minye Kyawswa was born in late 752 ME (c. early 1391), [about nine months] after Prince Bawlawkyantaw's death in early 752 ME (c. April 1390). It also says he died on Wednesday, 4th waxing of Late Tagu 775 ME (Saturday, 24 March 1414) in his 25th year (aged 24). The prince would have been at most 23 in March 1414 if he was born in early 1391 per its earlier narrative.)
Maha Yazawin	c. early 1391 – 21 March 1417 [sic]	~26	early 1412 – 21 March 1417 [sic]	(Note: Born in late 752 ME (c. early 1391), [about nine months] after Prince Bawlawkyantaw's death in late 751 ME (c. March 1390). Died on Wednesday, 4th waxing of Late Tagu 778 ME (Sunday, 21 March 1417). Appointed crown prince in late 773 ME (early 1412).)
Mani Yadanabon	1391/92 – 1416/17; Saturday born	25 (26th year)	not mentioned	(Note: The Mani Yadanabon is inconsistent. It says, Minye Kyawswa, a Saturday born, died in Tagu 778 ME, which could mean March 1416 (or March 1417 if Late Tagu) in his 26th year (aged 25). In an earlier section, it says Minye Kyawswa, in his 17th year (aged 16), invaded Arakan in 766 ME (1404/05), meaning he was born c. 1388.)
Yazawin Thit	c. early 1391 – 13 March 1415	24 (25th year)	1406/07 – 13 March 1415	(Note: Born in late 752 ME (c. early 1391), [about nine months] after Prince Bawlawkyantaw's death in early 752 ME (c. April 1390). Died on Wednesday, 4th waxing of Late Tagu 776 ME (Wednesday, 13 March 1415). Appointed crown prince in 768 ME (1406/07).)
Hmannan Yazawin	c. early 1391 – 21 March 1417 [sic]	~26	1406/07 – 21 March 1417 [sic]	(Note: Born in late 752 ME (c. early 1391), [about nine months] after Prince Bawlawkyantaw's death in early 752 ME (c. April 1390). Died on Wednesday, 4th waxing of Late Tagu 778 ME (Sunday, 21 March 1417). Appointed crown prince in 768 ME (1406/07).)

== Ancestry ==
Ancestry of Crown Prince Minye Kyawswa

8. Min Shin Saw of Thayet
4. Swa Saw Ke
9. Shin Myat Hla of Prome
2. Minkhaung I of Ava
10. unnamed
5. Saw Beza
11. unnamed
1. Min Phyu
12. unnamed
6. Tho Ngan Bwa of Mohnyin
13. unnamed
3. Shin Mi-Nauk of Mohnyin
14. unnamed
7. unnamed
15. unnamed

== Bibliography ==
- Goh, Geok Yian (2009). Connecting and Distancing: Southeast Asia and China. Institute of Southeast Asian. ISBN 9789812308566.
- Fernquest, Jon (Spring 2006). "Rajadhirat's Mask of Command: Military Leadership in Burma (c. 1348–1421)" (PDF). SBBR. 4 (1). Archived from the original (PDF) on 1 August 2019.
- Fernquest, Jon (Autumn 2006). "Crucible of War: Burma and the Ming in the Tai Frontier Zone (1382–1454)" (PDF). SOAS Bulletin of Burma Research. 4 (2). Archived from the original (PDF) on 15 April 2019.
- Harvey, G. E. (1925). History of Burma: From the Earliest Times to 10 March 1824. London: Frank Cass & Co. Ltd.
- Htin Aung, Maung (1967). A History of Burma. New York and London: Cambridge University Press.
- Kala, U (2006) [1724]. Maha Yazawin (in Burmese). Vol. 1–3 (4th printing ed.). Yangon: Ya-Pyei Publishing.
- Maha Sithu (2012) [1798]. Kyaw Win; Thein Hlaing (eds.). Yazawin Thit (in Burmese). Vol. 1–3 (2nd ed.). Yangon: Ya-Pyei Publishing.
- Royal Historians of Burma (1960) [c. 1680]. U Hla Tin (Hla Thamein) (ed.). Zatadawbon Yazawin (in Burmese). Historical Research Directorate of the Union of Burma.
- Phayre, Lt. Gen. Sir Arthur P. (1967) [1883]. History of Burma. London: Susil Gupta.
- Phayre, Maj. Gen. Sir Arthur P. (1873). "The History of Pegu". Journal of the Asiatic Society of Bengal. 42. Oxford University.
- Royal Historical Commission of Burma (2003) [1832]. Hmannan Yazawin (in Burmese). Vol. 1–3. Yangon: Ministry of Information, Myanmar.
- Sandalinka, Shin (2009) [1781]. Mani Yadanabon (in Burmese) (4th printing ed.). Yangon: Seit-Ku Cho Cho.
- Sandamala Linkara, Ashin (1997–1999) [1931]. Rakhine Razawin Thit (in Burmese). Vol. 1–2. Yangon: Tetlan Sarpay.
- Than Tun (December 1959). "History of Burma: A.D. 1300–1400". Journal of Burma Research Society. XLII (II).

Minye Kyawswa Ava Kingdom Born: c. January 1391 Died: 13 March 1415
Royal titles
Preceded by Theiddat as Heir Presumptive	Heir to the Burmese Throne c. December 1406 – 13 March 1415	Succeeded by Thihathu
Preceded by Sokkate as Acting Governor	Viceroy of Prome c. July 1413 – November 1413	Succeeded by Thihathu
