= Htihlaing of Prome =

Min Htihlaing မင်းထီးလှိုင်

Governor of Prome
- In office 1388/89–1390
- Monarch: Swa Saw Ke
- Preceded by: Myet-Hna Shay
- Succeeded by: Letya Pyanchi

Min Htihlaing (Burmese: မင်းထီးလှိုင်, [mɪ́ɴ tʰí l̥àiɴ]) was governor of Prome (Pyay) from 1388/89 to c. 1390, according to the Maha Yazawin and Hmannan Yazawin chronicles. However, the two chronicles are internally inconsistent; they say in their Summary of Rulers of Prome section that Htihlaing ruled until 1393/94. The other main chronicle Yazawin Thit does not list him as governor of Prome at all.

== Bibliography ==
- Kala, U (2006) [1724]. Maha Yazawin (in Burmese). Vol. 1–3 (4th printing ed.). Yangon: Ya-Pyei Publishing.
- Maha Sithu (2012) [1798]. Myint Swe; Kyaw Win; Thein Hlaing (eds.). Yazawin Thit (in Burmese). Vol. 1–3 (2nd printing ed.). Yangon: Ya-Pyei Publishing.
- Royal Historical Commission of Burma (2003) [1832]. Hmannan Yazawin (in Burmese). Vol. 1–3. Yangon: Ministry of Information, Myanmar.

Htihlaing of Prome Ava Kingdom
Royal titles
Preceded by Myet-Hna Shay	Governor of Prome; 1388/89 – 1390	Succeeded by Letya Pyanchi
