= Sokkate of Prome =

Sokkate စုက္ကတေး

Governor of Prome
- In office c. April 1413 – July 1413
- Monarch: Minkhaung I
- Preceded by: Letya Pyanchi
- Succeeded by: Minye Kyawswa I (as Viceroy)

Governor-General of Sandoway
- In office 1411–1412
- Monarch: Minkhaung I
- Succeeded by: Bya Paik

Personal details
- Died: c. April 1426 Wetchet, north of Sagaing; Ava Kingdom

Military service
- Allegiance: Royal Ava Army
- Years of service: 1400s–26
- Rank: Commander
- Commands: Arakan (1411–12)
- Battles/wars: Forty Years' War

Sokkate (Burmese: စုက္ကတေး [soʊʔ kə té]) was acting governor of Prome (Pyay) for three months in 1413. (Note: (Maha Yazawin Vol. 2 2006: 34) says his term lasted seven months. But according to (Maha Yazawin Vol. 2 2006: 163) and (Hmannan Vol. 2 2003: 214), his term lasted just three months. It was another case of Burmese numerals ၃ (3) and ၇ (7) being mis-copied.) He was a commander in the Royal Ava Army, and temporarily assumed governorship of Prome after Gov. Letya Pyanchi of Prome died of wounds c. April 1413. Sokkate was succeeded by Crown Prince Minye Kyawswa, who became the governor-general of Prome.

== Military service ==
Campaign	Location	Summary
Forty Years' War (1410−11)	Lower Burma	Part of the first invasion of Lower Burma by Crown Prince Minye Kyawswa in 1410.
Forty Years' War (1411−12)	Arakan	Part of the invasion of Arakan in early 1411. Appointed by Minye Kyawswa to guard Sandoway (Thandwe). Defended Sandoway against Hanthawaddy forces led by Gen. Bya Paik in the dry season of 1411–12 but Sandoway ultimately fell. Retreated to Launggyet but soon had to leave the Arakanese capital as Ava troops lacked popular support.
Ava Civil War (1426)	Ava (Inwa)	Part of King Min Nyo's defense forces of Ava against Gov. Thado of Mohnyin.

== Bibliography ==
- Kala, U (2006) [1724]. Maha Yazawin (in Burmese). Vol. 1–3 (4th printing ed.). Yangon: Ya-Pyei Publishing.
- Maha Sithu (2012) [1798]. Myint Swe; Kyaw Win; Thein Hlaing (eds.). Yazawin Thit (in Burmese). Vol. 1–3 (2nd printing ed.). Yangon: Ya-Pyei Publishing.
- Royal Historical Commission of Burma (2003) [1832]. Hmannan Yazawin (in Burmese). Vol. 1–3. Yangon: Ministry of Information, Myanmar.

Sokkate of Prome Ava Kingdom
Royal titles
Preceded by Letya Pyanchi	Governor of Prome c. April – July 1413	Succeeded by Minye Kyawswa I as Viceroy
