= Saw Pyei Chantha =

Saw Pyei Chantha စောပြည့်ချမ်းသာ

Queen consort of Hanthawaddy
- Tenure: March 1408 – c. December 1421

Chief Queen Consort of Launggyet
- Tenure: c. January 1408 – March 1408
- Predecessor: Saw Sit as (sovereign queen)
- Successor: unknown
- Born: c. January 1392; Pyinzi; Ava Kingdom
- Died: Unknown; Pegu (Bago)? Hanthawaddy kingdom
- Spouse: Anawrahta (1408); Razadarit (1408–1421)
- House: Ava
- Father: Minkhaung I
- Mother: Shin Mi-Nauk
- Religion: Theravada Buddhism

Saw Pyei Chantha (Burmese: စောပြည့်ချမ်းသာ [sɔ́ bjḛ tɕʰáɴðà]), also spelled Shwe Bye Kyantha (Burmese: ရွှေပြည့်ချမ်းသာ), was the chief queen consort of Arakan for a few months in 1408. After she and her first husband King Anawrahta of Launggyet were captured by the Hanthawaddy forces in 1408, she became a junior queen consort of King Razadarit of Hanthawaddy.

== Brief ==
The future queen was the second child of Prince Minkhaung of Pyinzi and his first wife Shin Mi-Nauk. His father was a son of then King Swa Saw Ke of Ava while his mother was a daughter of Sawbwa (Chief) Tho Ngan Bwa of Mohnyin. Minkhaung and Mi-Nauk had been wedded in a marriage of state in 1389/90 during a brief respite of hostilities between Ava and Mohnyin.

She had an elder brother Minye Kyawswa, and two younger brothers Minye Thihathu and Minye Kyawhtin. They siblings grew up in Pyinzi, 60 km south of the capital Ava (Inwa), until 1400. On 25 November 1400, their father ascended the Ava throne, and the family moved to Ava.

Circa January 1408, her father sent her to marry Anawrahta, the vassal king of the western kingdom of Arakan, whom her father had appointed a year earlier. (Note: The standard chronicles (Maha Yazawin Vol. 1 2006: 310) and (Hmannan Vol. 1 2003: 445) say that she was in her 13th year in 766 ME (1404/05) when she was married off to Anawrahta of Arakan a year after he was appointed vassal king in 765 ME (1403/04), implying that she was born c. 1392. However, the Arakanese chronicle Rakhine Razawin Thit (RRT Vol. 2 1999: 9) says Ava forces took Launggyet on Monday, 5th waning of Nadaw 768 ME (29 November 1406). It means she was sent to Launggyet in late 1407 or early 1408. It also means that she could not be in her 13th year (aged 12) in 1408 since her younger brother Thihathu was born in 1394. It is likely that she was in her 17th year (aged 16), and her reported age of 13th year was actually 17th year. (The Burmese numerals ၃ (3) and ၇ (7) can be easily mis-copied.)) But her reign as the chief queen was short. King Razadarit of Hanthawaddy, who had been concerned about Ava's growing empire, ordered an invasion of Arakan while Ava was entangled with the Shan state of Hsenwi in the north. The Hanthawaddy army took Launggyet in March 1408. (Note: (Yazawin Thit Vol. 1 2012: 228): Launggyet taken in Late Tagu 967 ME (25 February 1408 to 24 March 1408).) Razadarit had Anawrahta executed, and raised Saw Pyei Chantha, as one of his junior queens.

The brazen act greatly incensed her father, and led to the renewed war between the two kingdoms for the next decade. The queen joined her paternal aunt Thupaba Dewi, who had been given to Razadarit in a marriage of state as part of the truce of 1403, in the Hanthawaddy king's harem. Three months later, her 34-year-old mother Mi-Nauk became Razadarit's queen as well after Mi-Nauk was captured by the Hanthawaddy forces during Minkhaung's ill-advised invasion of the south in the rainy season of 1408.

== Ancestry ==
Ancestry of Princess Saw Pyei Chantha

8. Min Shin Saw of Thayet
4. Swa Saw Ke
9. Shin Myat Hla of Prome
2. Minkhaung I
10. unnamed
5. Saw Beza
11. unnamed
1. Pyei Chantha
12. unnamed
6. Tho Ngan Bwa
13. unnamed
3. Shin Mi-Nauk
14. unnamed
7. unnamed
15. unnamed

== Bibliography ==
- Harvey, G. E. (1925). History of Burma: From the Earliest Times to 10 March 1824. London: Frank Cass & Co. Ltd.
- Kala, U (1724). Maha Yazawin (in Burmese). Vol. 1–3 (2006, 4th printing ed.). Yangon: Ya-Pyei Publishing.
- Maha Sithu (2012) [1798]. Kyaw Win; Thein Hlaing (eds.). Yazawin Thit (in Burmese). Vol. 1–3 (2nd ed.). Yangon: Ya-Pyei Publishing.
- Pan Hla, Nai (1968). Razadarit Ayedawbon (in Burmese) (8th printing, 2005 ed.). Yangon: Armanthit Sarpay.
- Royal Historical Commission of Burma (1832). Hmannan Yazawin (in Burmese). Vol. 1–3 (2003 ed.). Yangon: Ministry of Information, Myanmar.
- Sandamala Linkara, Ashin (1931). Rakhine Razawin Thit (in Burmese). Vol. 1–2 (1997–1999 ed.). Yangon: Tetlan Sarpay.
- Than Tun (December 1959). "History of Burma: A.D. 1300–1400". Journal of Burma Research Society. XLII (II).

Saw Pyei Chantha Ava Born: c. January 1392 Died: ?
Royal titles
Unknown	Queen Consort of Hanthawaddy; March 1408 – c. December 1421	Unknown
Preceded by Saw Sit	Chief queen consort of Arakan c. January 1408 – March 1408	Unknown
