= Anawrahta of Launggyet =

Anawrahta Minsaw အနော်ရထာ မင်းစော
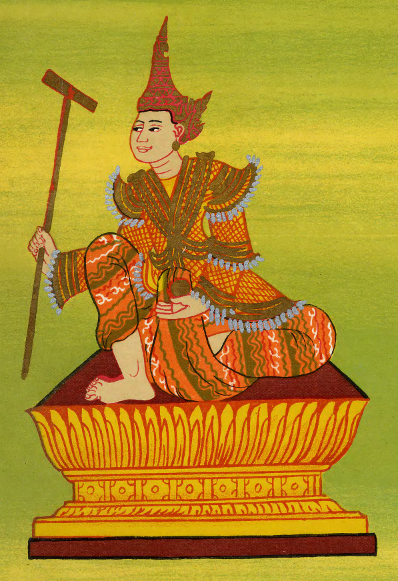
- Portrayed as the Shwe Nawrahta nat

King of Arakan
- Reign: c. December 1406 – March 1408
- Predecessor: Min Saw Mon (sovereign king)
- Successor: Min Saw Mon
- Monarch: Minkhaung I

Sawbwa of Kalay
- Reign: c. 1406 – c. December 1406
- Predecessor: Min Chay-To
- Successor: Min Nyo
- Died: March 1408; Late Tagu, 769 ME; Bassein (Pathein), Hanthawaddy kingdom
- Consort: Saw Pyei Chantha (1408)
- House: Ava
- Religion: Theravada Buddhism

Anawrahta Minsaw (Burmese: အနော်ရထာ မင်းစော, pronounced [ʔənɔ̀jətʰà mɪ́ɴ sɔ́]; d. March 1408) was the king of Launggyet Arakan from 1406 to 1408. He was appointed to the position by his overlord King Minkhaung I of the Ava Kingdom. He later married Minkhaung's eldest daughter Saw Pyei Chantha. He was overthrown in 1408 by the Hanthawaddy kingdom army, and subsequently executed on the order of King Razadarit of Hanthawaddy. He is one of two historical personalities that make up the Shwe Nawrahta nat spirit in the Burmese pantheon of nats.

== Brief ==
=== Accession ===
Prior to his appointment as King of Arakan, he was known as Gamani, the governor of Kalay, a vassal Shan state of Ava. His rule at Kalay apparently was short. (Note: The main royal chronicles (Maha Yazawin Vol. 1 2006: 310, 330) (Yazawin Thit Vol. 1 2012: 224–225) say Anawrahta was already governor of Kalay when Arakan was conquered (in 1406). But other chronicles Zatadawbon Yazawin (Zata 1960: 90) and Mani Yadanabon (Yazawin Thit Vol. 1 2012: 225, footnote 3, citing Mani) say Nyo succeeded Min Chay-To, the first ruler to pay tribute to Ava.) Circa December 1406, his overlord King Minkhaung I appointed him to be king of Arakan, which Ava forces led by Prince Minye Kyawswa had just conquered. (Note: According to the Rakhine Razawin Thit chronicle (RRT Vol. 2 1999: 9), Ava forces led by Minye Kyawswa took Launggyet on Monday, 5th waning of Nadaw 768 ME (29 November 1406).) Now known by his royal style of Anawrahta Minsaw, he was the third Ava-appointed king of Arakan. (Note: (Hmannan Vol. 1 2003: 410, 414) and (Harvey 1925: 86): The first two were Saw Mon II (r. 1373/84–1380/81) and Saw Me (r. 1380/81–1385/86).)

=== Reign ===
According to the Arakanese chronicle Rakhine Razawin Thit, Anawrahta's regime brutally suppressed dissent, and never gained popular support. His overlord seemed oblivious. About a year later, Minkhaung sent his eldest daughter Saw Pyei Chantha to the Arakanese capital Launggyet to be Anawrahta's chief queen.

But their rule was soon to be challenged. By January 1408, (Note: (Yazawin Thit Vol. 1 2012: 228): Razadarit made the decision to invade Arakan in Tabodwe 769 ME (28 December 1407 to 25 January 1408) after a prayer service at the Mya Thi-Tin Pagoda.) King Razadarit of Hanthawaddy had decided to intervene. Pegu had been concerned about Ava's acquisitions (1404–1406) that had swallowed up nearer Shan states and Arakan. With the majority of Ava troops campaigning in the north in early 1408, Razadarit decided it was time. He sent in an invasion force to place either the former king of Arakan Min Saw Mon or Prince Min Khayi on the throne. (Note: According to the Razadarit Ayedawbon (Pan Hla 2005: 240), the Pegu nominee was Min Saw Mon while the chronicle Rakhine Razawin Thit (RRT Vol. 2 1999: 10), it was Min Khayi.) The invasion force consisted of just 4000 to 5000 troops but they were greeted as liberators by the populace, and quickly advanced to the capital Launggyet. Anawrahta and his Ava coterie put up a fight but were quickly defeated. He tried to flee but was arrested. It was March 1408. (Note: (Yazawin Thit Vol. 1 2012: 228): Launggyet taken in Late Tagu 769 ME (25 February 1408 to 24 March 1408).)

Anawrahta, Saw Pyei Chantha and 3000 prisoners of war (probably including the garrison's families) were deported to Bassein (Pathein) in the Irrawaddy delta. On arrival there, he was promptly executed while his young wife became a queen of Razadarit.

== Legacy ==
Anawrahta is one of the two historical Nawrahtas who came to form the Shwe Nawrahta nat in the Burmese pantheon of nat spirits.

== See also ==
- List of Arakanese monarchs

== Notes ==
=== Bibliography ===
- Harvey, G. E. (1925). History of Burma: From the Earliest Times to 10 March 1824. London: Frank Cass & Co. Ltd.
- Kala, U (1724). Maha Yazawin (in Burmese). Vol. 1–3 (2006, 4th printing ed.). Yangon: Ya-Pyei Publishing.
- Maha Sithu (2012) [1798]. Kyaw Win; Thein Hlaing (eds.). Yazawin Thit (in Burmese). Vol. 1–3 (2nd printing ed.). Yangon: Ya-Pyei Publishing.
- Pan Hla, Nai (1968). Razadarit Ayedawbon (in Burmese) (8th printing, 2005 ed.). Yangon: Armanthit Sarpay.
- Royal Historical Commission of Burma (1832). Hmannan Yazawin (in Burmese). Vol. 1–3 (2003 ed.). Yangon: Ministry of Information, Myanmar.
- Sandamala Linkara, Ashin (1931). Rakhine Razawin Thit (in Burmese). Vol. 1–2 (1997–1999 ed.). Yangon: Tetlan Sarpay.

Anawrahta of Launggyet Ava Kingdom Died: March 1408
Royal titles
Preceded by Min Saw Mon	King of Arakan c. December 1406 – March 1408	Succeeded by Min Saw Mon or Min Khayi as Pegu vassal
Preceded by Min Chay-To	Sawbwa of Kalay; 1406? – c. December 1406	Succeeded by Min Nyo
