= Shin Mi-Nauk =

Shin Mi-Nauk ရှင်မိနောက်
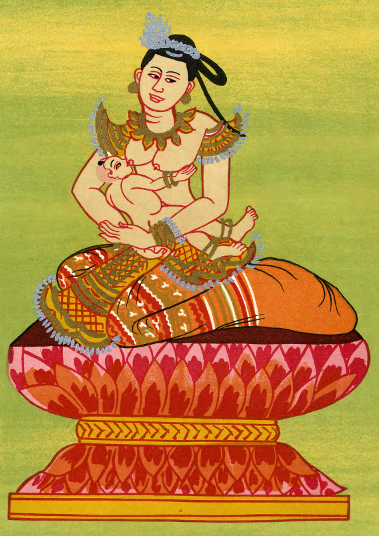
- As the Anauk Mibaya nat

Queen consort of Hanthawaddy
- Tenure: c. July 1408 – c. December 1423

Queen of the Western Palace of Ava
- Tenure: 25 November 1400 – c. July 1408
- Predecessor: Saw Taw Oo
- Successor: Shin Bo-Me

Queen Mother of Ava
- Tenure: c. 1423–c. 1425
- Born: 1374 (Note: She was born in 1374 per Maha Yazawin, and in 1373 per Hmannan Yazawin, inferred from their reporting. Maha Yazawin (Maha Yazawin Vol. 1 2006: 334–335) says she was 34 (in 35th year) when she was captured by Hanthawaddy forces c. July 1408. (Hmannan Vol. 1 2003: 485) also says she was 34 (in 35th year) but a year earlier in 1407. The chroniclers of Hmannan changed Maha Yazawin's invasion date by a year earlier but did not update Shin Mi-Nauk's age accordingly.); Mohnyin
- Died: Ava (Ava)
- Spouse: Minkhaung I (1389–1408); Razadarit (1408–21)
- Issue: Minye Kyawswa; Saw Pyei Chantha; Minye Thihathu; Minye Kyawhtin
- House: Mohnyin
- Father: Tho Ngan Bwa (Hsongamhpa)
- Religion: Theravada Buddhism

Shin Mi-Nauk (Burmese: ရှင်မိနောက် [ʃɪ̀ɰ̃ mḭ naʊʔ]), also known as Nang Hswe Hking (Shan: ၼၢင်းသွႆးၶိင်ႇ), was a senior queen consort of King Minkhaung I of Ava from 1400 to 1407. She was the mother of Crown Prince Minye Kyawswa, who is one of the most celebrated generals in Burmese history, and King Thihathu of Ava. Mi-Nauk was a daughter of Hsongamhpa, the saopha (chief) of Shan state of Mohnyin. She was married to Minkhaung, son King Swa Saw Ke of Ava when Ava and Mohnyin were in a rare period of good relations in 1389. (Note: Hmannan (Hmannan Vol. 1 2003: 424) only says she was married to Min Swe in (751 ME = 29 March 1389 to 29 March 1390). But it likely took place in early 751 ME (in 1389) since the following entry in the chronicle is on the dry-season campaign of 1389–90.) From 1391 to 1395, she gave birth to three sons, Minye Kyawswa, Minye Thihathu and Minye Kyawhtin, and a daughter, Saw Pyei Chantha at Pyinzi, which was Minkhaung's fief.

Mi-Nauk became the queen of Ava on 25 November 1400 when Minkhaung ascended to the throne of Ava. Ava, at that time, was fighting against the Kingdom of Hanthawaddy in the south. In May 1408, Minkhaung invaded the Hanthawaddy country and reached the outskirts of Pegu. As it was the custom of the day, she accompanied Minkhaung during his military expeditions. Three months later, c. July 1408, the Hanthawaddy army counter-attacked and soundly defeated the Ava army. In the process of chaotic retreat, Mi-Nauk was captured by the Hanthawaddy army. King Razadarit of Hanthawaddy made a queen of his. Inside Razadarit's harem was her daughter Saw Pyei Chantha, who was captured at Arakan by the Hanthawaddy army, and also made a queen of Razadarit.

Minye Kyawswa, in particular, would not forgive Razadarit for putting his mother and sister in the harem. He was determined to defeat Razadarit in war and came close to accomplishing it. But he could not rescue his mother and sister, as he died from battle wounds in March 1415.

== Anauk Mibaya ==
Anauk Mibaya (Burmese: အနောက်မိဘုရား [ənaʊʔ mḭbəjá]; lit. 'Western Queen') is one of 37 nats in the official Burmese pantheon who allegedly died of shock after seeing Min Kyawzwa (U Min Gyaw) on a magic stallion in a cotton field. She is portrayed topless, sitting on a lotus and nursing her baby. Her son Thihathu also entered the pantheon as Aung Pinle Hsinbyushin.

== Bibliography ==
- Harvey, G. E. (1925). History of Burma: From the Earliest Times to 10 March 1824. London: Frank Cass & Co. Ltd.
- Kala, U (1720). Maha Yazawin (in Burmese). Vol. 1–3 (2006, 4th printing ed.). Yangon: Ya-Pyei Publishing.
- Royal Historical Commission of Burma (1829–1832). Hmannan Yazawin (in Burmese). Vol. 1–3 (2003 ed.). Yangon: Ministry of Information, Myanmar.
- Tun Aung Chain (2004). Selected Writings of Tun Aung Chain. Myanmar Historical Commission.

Shin Mi-Nauk Ava Dynasty Born: 1374 Died: ?
Royal titles
Preceded by	Queen mother of Ava; 1423–1425	Succeeded by
Preceded by Saw Taw Oo	Queen of the Western Palace of Ava; 1400–1408	Succeeded by Shin Bo-Me
