= Myet-Hna Shay of Prome =

Mingyi Myet-Hna Shay မင်းကြီး မျက်နှာရှည်

Governor of Prome
- Reign: 1377/78 – 1388/89
- Predecessor: Saw Yan Naung (as viceroy)
- Successor: Htihlaing
- Born: c. 1340s Myinsaing; Pinya Kingdom
- Died: 1388/89; 750 ME; Prome (Pyay); Ava Kingdom
- House: Ava
- Father: Shwe Nan Shin of Myinsaing
- Religion: Theravada Buddhism

Mingyi Myet-Hna Shay (Burmese: မင်းကြီး မျက်နှာရှည်, [mɪ́ɴdʑí mjɛʔn̥àʃè] or [mɪ́ɴdʑí mjɛʔn̥əʃè]) was viceroy of Prome (Pyay) from 1377/78 to 1388/89. He was appointed to succeed his paternal uncle Saw Yan Naung by his other paternal uncle King Swa Saw Ke of Ava. He fought in the first two campaigns (1385–1387) of the Ava–Hanthawaddy War (1385–1391). He died about a year later. (Note: (Hmannan Vol. 2 2003: 214) says Myet-Hna Shay died in 750 ME (29 March 1388 to 28 March 1389). Furthermore, (Hmannan Vol. 1 2003: 427) notes that because Myet-Hna Shay was no longer alive in 751 ME (29 March 1389 to 29 March 1390), Swa appointed a new governor of Prome.)

== Bibliography ==
- Maha Sithu (2012) [1798]. Kyaw Win; Thein Hlaing (eds.). Yazawin Thit (in Burmese). Vol. 1–3 (2nd printing ed.). Yangon: Ya-Pyei Publishing.
- Royal Historical Commission of Burma (2003) [1832]. Hmannan Yazawin (in Burmese). Vol. 1–3. Yangon: Ministry of Information, Myanmar.

Myet-Hna Shay of Prome Ava Kingdom Born: c. 1340s Died: 1388/89
Royal titles
Preceded by Saw Yan Naung as viceroy	Governor of Prome; 1377/78 – 1388/89	Succeeded by Htihlaing
