= Letya Pyanchi of Prome =

Letya Pyanchi လက်ျာပျံချီ

Governor of Prome
- Reign: c. early 1390 – April 1413
- Predecessor: Htihlaing
- Successor: Sokkate
- Born: Martaban Kingdom
- Died: c. April 1413; Kason 775 ME near Dagon, Hanthawaddy Kingdom
- Spouse: Saw Min Hla of Prome (Note: (Yazawin Thit Vol. 1 247): Pyanchi's wife Saw Min Hla was not Queen Saw Min Hla of the same era.)
- House: Hanthawaddy
- Religion: Theravada Buddhism

Letya Pyanchi (Burmese: လက်ျာပျံချီ, [lɛʔ jà pjàɴ tɕʰì]; d. c. April 1413) was governor of Prome (Pyay) from 1390 to 1413. The governor, a Martaban–Hanthawaddy royal, was a key Ava commander in the Forty Years' War against Hanthawaddy Pegu.

== Brief ==
He was a Hanthawaddy royal, and son-in-law of Viceroy Laukpya of Myaungmya. His Mon language title is reported in Burmese as Bya Kyin or Bya Kyi. Kyin remained loyal to his father-in-law who in 1384 decided to revolt against the new king at Pegu, Razadarit. Their rebellion in the Irrawaddy delta lasted for the next five years with the help of King Swa Saw Ke of Ava.

Kyin and his brother-in-law Bya Kun were driven out by Razadarit's invasion of the delta in 1389–90. Swa Saw Ke welcomed the duo, and appointed Bya Kun governor of Salin with the title of Nawrahta, and Bya Kyin governor of Prome (Pyay) with the title of Letya Pyanchi. It was early 1390. (Note: Maha Yazawin and Hmannan Yazawin chronicles are internally inconsistent. Their Summary of Rulers of Prome sections (Maha Yazawin Vol. 2 2006: 163) and (Hmannan Vol. 2 2003: 214) say Pyanchi became governor in 755 ME (1393/94). But earlier, they also say that Pyanchi succeeded Myet-Hna Shay as governor in 751 ME (1389/90) after Razadarit's dry season campaign, which means the appointment most probably came in early 1390.) He ruled, Prome, a key province and the gateway to Upper Burma for the next 22+ years. He fought several campaigns in the Forty Years' War. He was wounded by an arrow at the battle of Hmawbi c. April 1413. (Note: Chronicles are again inconsistent. (Maha Yazawin Vol. 2 2006: 163) and (Hmannan Vol. 2 2003: 214) say he died in 777 ME (1415/16). But according to their own narrative earlier, he died before Nayon 775 ME (30 April to 28 May 1413).) He died en route to Prome, soon after having reached Dagon.

== Military service ==
All his campaigns were part of the Forty Years' War on the side of Ava.

Campaign	Troops commanded	Summary
1389−1390	?	Co-deputy commander of Bassein
1390−1391	1 regiment (1000 troops)	Part of the 17,000-strong river-borne invasion force that attacked Gu-Htut.
1401−1403	unknown	Defended Prome from Hanthawaddy Pegu forces in the dry season of 1401–02. Led the 1402 counterattack that broke the siege that captured a daughter of King Razadarit. Prome came under siege by Pegu forces again c. September 1402 until Ava forces defeated Pegu forces at the battle of Nawin outside of Prome on 26 December 1402.
1408	1 regiment	Part of the disastrous invasion that began at the outset of the rainy season. Also commanded a regiment in the rearguard army in the retreat about four months after.
1410–1411	1 regiment	Commanded a regiment in the 7000-strong First Army that unsuccessfully tried to take the Irrawaddy delta.
1412–1413	unknown (defense of Prome); 1 regiment (1413 invasion)	Defended Hanthawaddy's siege of Prome for 4 months before Ava reinforcements broke the siege. Participated in Ava's subsequent invasion of the south. Led the attack on Hmawbi where he was wounded by an arrow. Died en route to Prome.

== Bibliography ==
- Fernquest, Jon (Spring 2006). "Rajadhirat's Mask of Command: Military Leadership in Burma (c. 1384–1421)" (PDF). SBBR. 4 (1). Archived from the original on 2009-02-19.
- Kala, U (2006) [1724]. Maha Yazawin (in Burmese). Vol. 1–3 (4th printing ed.). Yangon: Ya-Pyei Publishing.
- Maha Sithu (2012) [1798]. Kyaw Win; Thein Hlaing (eds.). Yazawin Thit (in Burmese). Vol. 1–3 (2nd ed.). Yangon: Ya-Pyei Publishing.
- Royal Historical Commission of Burma (2003) [1832]. Hmannan Yazawin (in Burmese). Vol. 1–3. Yangon: Ministry of Information, Myanmar.

Letya Pyanchi of Prome Ava Kingdom Died: c. April 1413
Royal titles
Preceded by Htihlaing	Governor of Prome; 1390 – 1413	Succeeded by Sokkate
