= Minye Kyawhtin of Pakhan =

Pretender to Ava throne, Burma (1425–1426)

Tarabya Minye Kyawhtin တရဖျား မင်းရဲကျော်ထင်

Governor of Pakhan
- Reign: c. November 1413 – August 1426
- Predecessor: Tarabya I
- Successor: Thiri Zeya Thura
- Monarch: Minkhaung I (1413–1421); Thihathu (1421–1425); Min Nyo (1425–1426)
- Born: late 1390s Pyinzi; Ava Kingdom
- Died: Unknown; Pagan (Bagan)? Ava Kingdom
- Spouses: Shin Saw Pu (1425–1426)
- Father: Minkhaung I
- Mother: Shin Mi-Nauk
- Religion: Theravada Buddhism

Minye Kyawhtin (Burmese: မင်းရဲကျော်ထင်, pronounced [mɪ́ɴjɛ́ tɕɔ̀dɪ̀ɴ]; also known as Tarabya II of Pakhan, ပုခန်း တရဖျား, [pəkʰáɴ təɹəbjá]) was governor of Pakhan from 1413 to 1426. The youngest son of King Minkhaung I of Ava was a top pretender to the Ava throne during the succession crisis in 1425–1426, following the assassinations of his brother King Thihathu and nephew King Min Hla.

Prince Tarabya of Pakhan initially ceded the throne to his half-cousin Prince Min Nyo of Kale in 1425 after Nyo gave him lavish gifts and Thihathu's favorite queen Shin Saw Pu. But he withdrew his support six months later when Nyo was about to be overthrown by Gov. Thado of Mohnyin. The prince refused to submit to Thado, who did not hail from the founding house of the dynasty. He could not attract any support from other vassals, and was easily defeated by the new king in 1426.

The prince was sent to live out his life outside the Shwezigon Pagoda in Pagan (Bagan), and is not heard from again in the chronicles. His nephew, also styled Minye Kyawhtin, would carry on the founding house's resistance against Thado and his successors until 1459.

== Early life and career ==
Minye Kyawhtin, also known by his personal name Min Tha Nyo (မင်းသားညို), was the youngest child of Queen Shin Mi-Nauk and King Minkhaung I of Ava (r. 1400–1421). He was probably born in the late 1390s, (Note: The main chronicles do not mention his age at any point in his life except that he was the youngest child. Given that his immediate older sibling Thihathu was born in 1394 per (Zata 1960: 74) and (Yazawin Thit Vol. 1 2012: 266), he must have been born in 1395 or later.) and had three full siblings: Minye Kyawswa, Saw Pyei Chantha and Minye Thihathu.

He was appointed governor of Pakhan (modern Pakokku District) by his father in 1413. (Note: Various chronicles report slightly different narratives. (Maha Yazawin Vol. 2 2006: 34) says Minkhaung appointed Minye Kyawhtin governor of Pakhan in 774 ME (29 March 1412 to 29 March 1413). (Yazawin Thit Vol. 1 2012: 246) corrects Maha Yazawin by saying the appointment took place in 775 ME after the rainy season (c. November 1413). (Hmannan Vol. 2 2003: 20) accepts Yazawin Thit's correction of 775 ME but says Minye Kyawswa was appointed, which most probably was a typographical error as Minye Kyawswa had been crown prince since 1406.) Unlike his older brothers, he did not play a prominent role in the long running war between Ava and Hanthawaddy Pegu (1385–1423). (Note: As governor of Pakhan, a major vassal state, he must have gone to the front from 1413 onwards. But outside of a brief mention in the 1422–1423 campaign in (Yazawin Thit Vol. 1 2012: 268), his name does not appear in any of the campaigns (1413–1418) in the chronicles. He was only a regimental commander in the 1422–1423 campaign in any case.)

== Ava succession crisis (1425–1426) ==
=== Initial submission ===
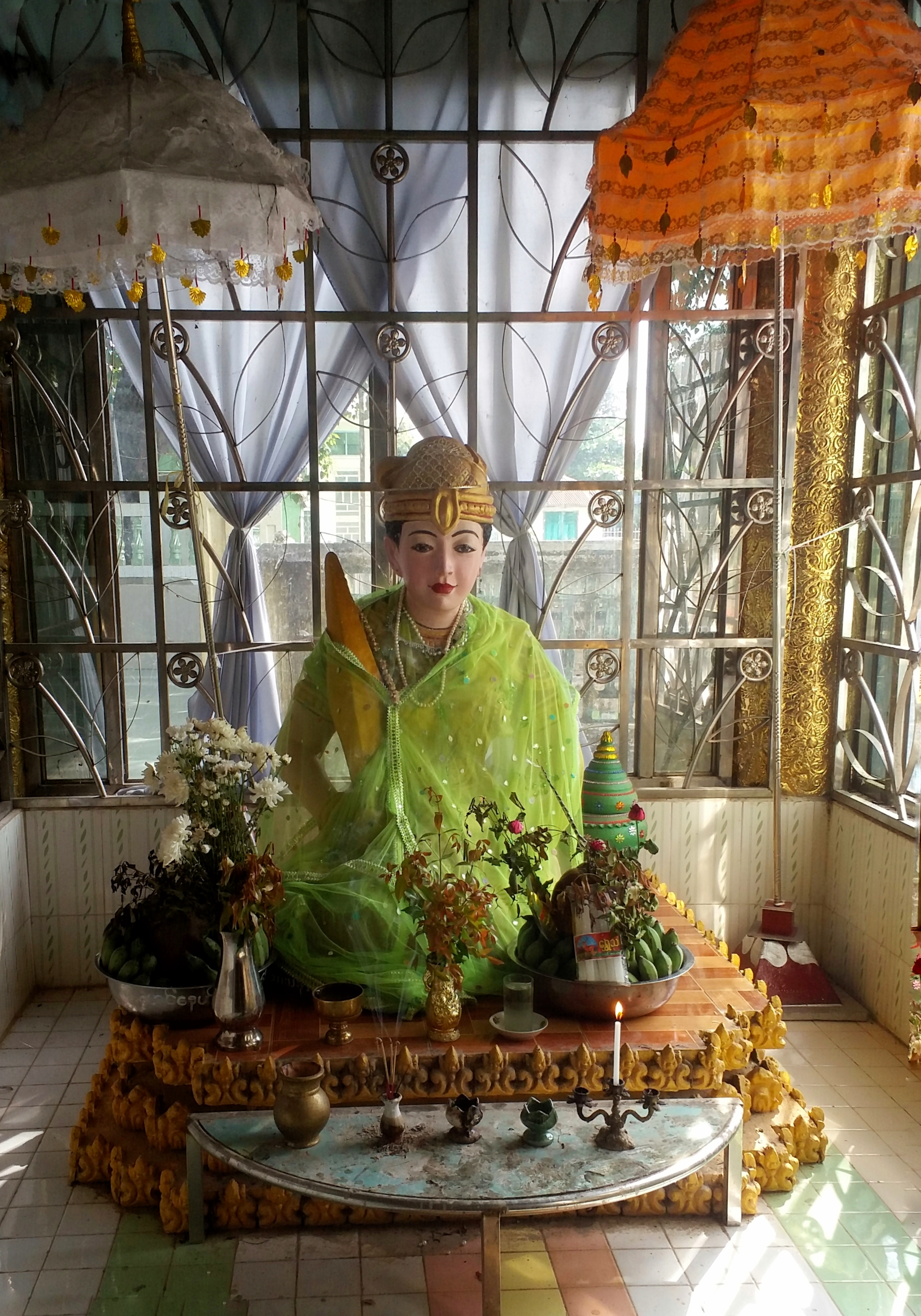
A statue depicting Queen Shin Saw Pu

In 1425, the prince, now styled as Tarabya of Pakhan, (Note: Per (Maha Yazawin Vol. 2 2006: 34), (Yazawin Thit Vol. 1 2012: 246) and (Hmannan Vol. 2 2003: 20), there was at least one prior Tarabya of Pakhan, who was moved to become governor of Pagan in 1413. The first Tarabya is sometimes referred to as Tarabya the Elder (ပုခန်း တရဖျားကြီး, lit. "the older Tarabya of Pakhan") as seen in (Yazawin Thit Vol. 1 2012: 291).) became ensnarled in the succession crisis at Ava (Inwa). In August 1425, Thihathu, who had been king since 1421, was assassinated. Just three months later, Thihathu's son and successor Min Hla too was assassinated. The assassinations were arranged by Queen Shin Bo-Me and Prince Min Nyo of Kale, who went on to seize the throne.

Although Tarabya was first in the line of succession after Min Hla's death, he did not challenge Nyo. Not only did Nyo have a strong claim to the throne as the only son of King Tarabya of Ava (r. 1400) but he was also one of the two leading commanders of the military. For his part, the new king gave his half-cousin the lord of Pakhan (Note: (Harvey 1925: 97) says Shin Saw Pu was given to the "lord of Pagan", which is an error. All the main chronicles say the queen was given to the lord of Pakhan. (Aung-Thwin 2017: 82) gives Pakhan as found in the chronicles.) lavish gifts and Queen Shin Saw Pu, Thihathu's favorite queen, perhaps as a face-saving gesture. (To be sure, Nyo most probably needed to get rid of Saw Pu from the palace as the queen was intensely disliked by Queen Bo-Me, who had put him on the throne. (Note: (Maha Yazawin Vol. 2 2006: 59), (Yazawin Thit Vol. 1 2012: 269), (Hmannan Vol. 2 2003: 57): A spurned Bo-Me decided to eliminate Thihathu after Saw Pu became his favorite.)) At any rate, Tarabya, along with the majority of the vassals from central and southern regions, pledged support to Nyo.

=== Rebellion ===
It turned out that the vassals needed to back up their pledge soon after. In February 1426, Gov. Thado of Mohnyin, having secured support from the northern Shan states, declared war on Nyo. Initially, Tarabya like other loyal vassals contributed the troops as vassals were required to. He personally led his regiment, which guarded the westerly approach towards the capital, but by early May when the tide of war had turned against Ava, Tarabya and other key vassal rulers, renounced their ties to Nyo, and retreated to their respective regions. Tarabya also brought his nephew, who then wore the title of Minye Kyawhtin, the eldest son of Crown Prince Minye Kyawswa, to Pakhan. Soon after, Nyo and Bo-Me fled, and Thado entered the capital on 16 May 1426. (Note: (Yazawin Thit Vol. 1 2012: 272): Thursday, 10th waxing of Nayon 788 ME = 16 May 1426)

Most vassal rulers were unsure of Thado's claim to the throne as he did not hail from the founding house of the dynasty. Although a few of the vassals would later raise long running rebellions throughout Thado's reign, they initially did not challenge Thado. Tarabya was the only exception. Considering himself the rightful heir to the Ava throne, Tarabya flatly rejected Thado's call for submission, but he could not get other vassals, even those surrounding Pakhan, to support him. Indeed, when the time came to choose, all the vassal rulers near Pakhan—Pagan, Sale, Sagu, Pakhan Nge, Salin and Prome—sided with Thado, and contributed troops to Thado's army.

Despite the odds, Tarabya held out at Pakhan. In August, (Note: (Hmannan Vol. 2 2003: 63): Tawthalin 788 ME = 2–31 August 1426) Thado sent two armies (with a combined strength of 5000 troops, 300 cavalry and 20 elephants), and sailed down the Irrawaddy with a naval force carrying another 4000 troops. Tarabya still refused to surrender. Thado waited for seven days before ordering an attack. His troops easily took the town, and captured both Tarabya (Minye Kyawhtin the elder) and his nephew (Minye Kyawhtin the younger).

== Aftermath ==
Thado, who began his career as a page for Prince Min Swe (King Minkhaung), had a soft side for the only living son and grandson of his deceased lord. Instead of executing the royals with the strongest claim to the throne, the king sent Tarabya to live in an estate near the Shwezigon Pagoda in Pagan (Bagan), and Minye Kyawhtin the younger to Thissein (modern Shwebo District). Thado did take Shin Saw Pu for himself. (Queen Shin Saw Pu, daughter of King Razadarit of Hanthawaddy Pegu, would later become the queen regnant of Hanthawaddy, and the only queen regnant in Burmese history.)

Thado would soon come to rue his decision to spare the princes' lives. Although Tarabya is not heard from again in the chronicles, the younger Minye Kyawhtin never gave up his claim to the throne. The young prince fled Thissein just a few months later, and soon raised a major rebellion that would last until 1459. (Note: See Minye Kyawhtin the younger's pesky rebellions in (Yazawin Thit Vol. 1 2012: 274–277; 291–293).)

== Ancestry ==
Tarabya Minye Kyawhtin was ultimately descended from the Pagan royal line from his father side, and Mohnyin royalty from his mother's side.

Ancestry of Prince Minye Kyawhtin

8. Min Shin Saw of Thayet
4. Swa Saw Ke
9. Shin Myat Hla of Prome
2. Minkhaung I of Ava
10. unnamed
5. Saw Beza
11. unnamed
1. Min Tha Nyo
12. unnamed
6. Tho Ngan Bwa of Mohnyin
13. unnamed
3. Shin Mi-Nauk of Mohnyin
14. unnamed
7. unnamed
15. unnamed

== Bibliography ==
- Aung-Thwin, Michael A. (2017). Myanmar in the Fifteenth Century. Honolulu: University of Hawai'i Press. ISBN 978-0-8248-6783-6.
- Harvey, G. E. (1925). History of Burma: From the Earliest Times to 10 March 1824. London: Frank Cass & Co.
- Kala, U (2006) [1724]. Maha Yazawin (in Burmese). Vol. 1–3 (4th printing ed.). Yangon: Ya-Pyei Publishing.
- Maha Sithu (2012) [1798]. Kyaw Win; Thein Hlaing (eds.). Yazawin Thit (in Burmese). Vol. 1–3 (2nd ed.). Yangon: Ya-Pyei Publishing.
- Royal Historians of Burma (1960) [c. 1680]. U Hla Tin (Hla Thamein) (ed.). Zatadawbon Yazawin. Historical Research Directorate of the Union of Burma.
- Royal Historical Commission of Burma (2003) [1832]. Hmannan Yazawin (in Burmese). Vol. 1–3. Yangon: Ministry of Information, Myanmar.

Minye Kyawhtin of Pakhan Ava Kingdom Born: late 1390s Died: ?
Royal titles
Preceded by Tarabya I	Governor of Pakhan; 1413–1426	Succeeded by Thiri Zeya Thura
