= Minkhaung I =

Minkhaung I; ပထမ မင်းခေါင်
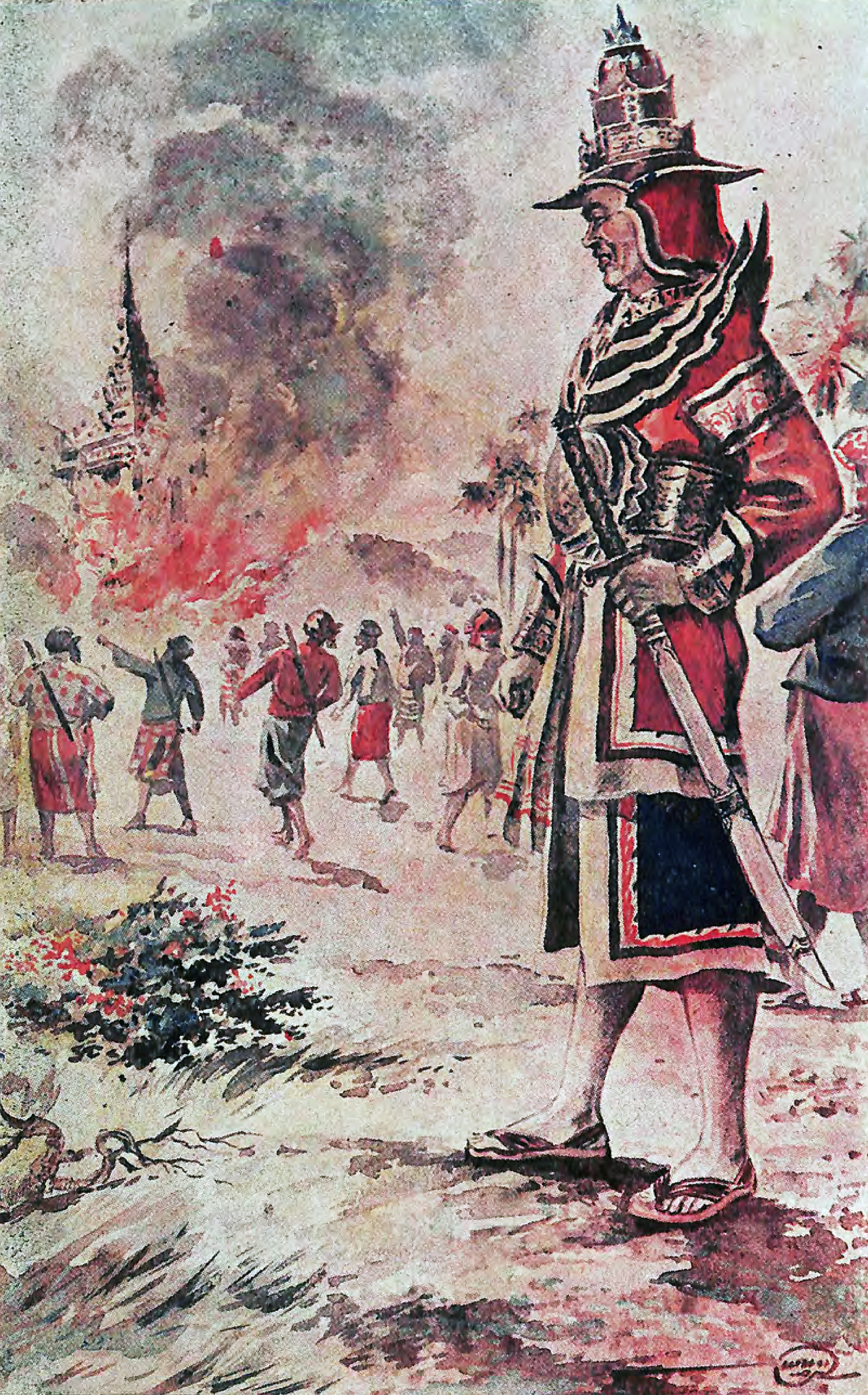
- Minkhaung I ordered his army to burn down a Buddhist hall erected by Razadarit. An illustration from Rachathirat, a Thai version of Razadarit Ayedawbon, 1946 printed edition.

King of Ava
- Reign: by 25 November 1400 – c. October 1421
- Predecessor: Tarabya
- Successor: Thihathu
- Chief Minister: Min Yaza

Governor of Pyinzi
- Reign: c. April 1385 – 25 November 1400
- Predecessor: new office
- Successor: Nandathingyan
- Born: 13 September 1373; Tuesday, 12th waning of Thadingyut 735 ME; Gazun Neint, Ava Kingdom
- Died: c. October 1421 (aged 48) c. Nadaw 783 ME; Ava (Inwa), Ava Kingdom
- Consort: Shin Saw; Saw Khway; Min Pyan; Shin Mi-Nauk; Shin Bo-Me
- Issue among others...: Minye Kyawswa; Saw Pyei Chantha; Thihathu; Minye Kyawhtin; Saw Nant-Tha
- House: Ava
- Father: Swa Saw Ke
- Mother: Saw Beza
- Religion: Theravada Buddhism

Minkhaung I of Ava (Burmese: ပထမ မင်းခေါင် [pətʰəma̰ mɪ́ɰ̃ɡàʊɰ̃]; also spelled Mingaung; 1373–1421) was king of Ava from 1400 to 1421. He is best remembered in Burmese history for his epic struggles against King Razadarit of Hanthawaddy Pegu in the Forty Years' War (1385–1424). As king, Minkhaung continued his father Swa Saw Ke's policy to restore the Pagan Empire. Under the military leadership of his eldest son Minye Kyawswa, Ava nearly succeeded. While he ultimately failed to conquer Hanthawaddy and Launggyet Arakan, he was able to bring in most of cis-Salween Shan states to the Ava orbit.

== Early life ==
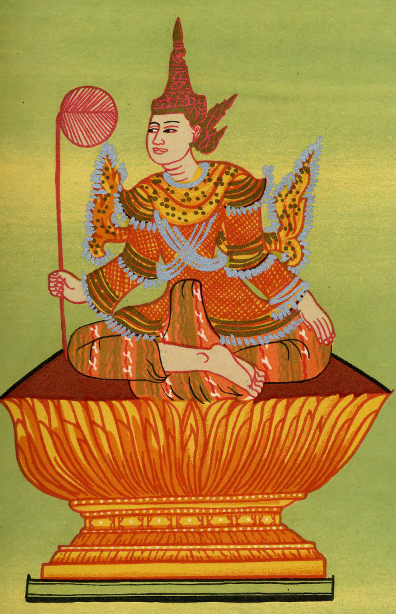
Swe's childhood rival Tarabya portrayed as Mintara nat

The future king was born in a small village called Gazun-Nyeint (present-day northern Sagaing Region) on 13 September 1373. (Note: Tuesday, 12th waning of Thadingyut 735 ME (Tuesday, 13 September 1373). Some scholars such as the editors of the 2006 edition of the Maha Yazawin translate the date as 13 October 1373, which is problematic since 13 October 1373 was a Thursday whereas Minkhaung was a Tuesday born per all the main chronicles. This discrepancy apparently is due to treating 735 ME as a leap year (which JC Eades' Southeast Asian Emphemeris also does.) If 735 ME is treated as a regular year, the resulting date falls on a Tuesday (on 13 September 1373).) His father King Swa Saw Ke of Ava had met his commoner mother Saw Beza earlier in the year during a military campaign against Mohnyin. Chronicles say that after giving birth to the child, Beza showed up at the Ava palace to present the male son, as instructed to by the king. The child was named Min Swe (မင်းဆွေ [mɪ́ɴ sʰwè]). The king made Beza a junior queen, and had two more children with her: Theiddat and Thupaba Dewi.

Min Swe grew up in Ava (Inwa) until he was eight. His life at the palace was not all well. Their older half-brother Tarabya, who was born to a senior queen, constantly bullied both Swe and Theiddat. The bullying became a serious problem, and in 1381/82, the king had to send away Swe and Theiddat to a small monastery near Pinle to study under the chief primate (Thinga-Yaza). The two princes studied under the learned monk, and traveled around the region, including Taungdwingyi, Minbu, Ngape and Padein, with their attendants.

== Governor of Pyinzi ==
Circa April 1385, Swa appointed Tarabya his heir-apparent. The king kept Swe out of Tarabya's reach, and appointed his 11-year-old son governor of Pyinzi, a small town about 85 km southwest of Ava. He also gave Swe command of the 33-member Pyinzi cavalry. Swe would rule Pyinzi for the next 15 years. Chronicles have little information about Swe's period as governor except that his rivalry with Tarabya continued, and that the rivalry may have cost Ava's best chance of defeating Hanthawaddy Pegu.

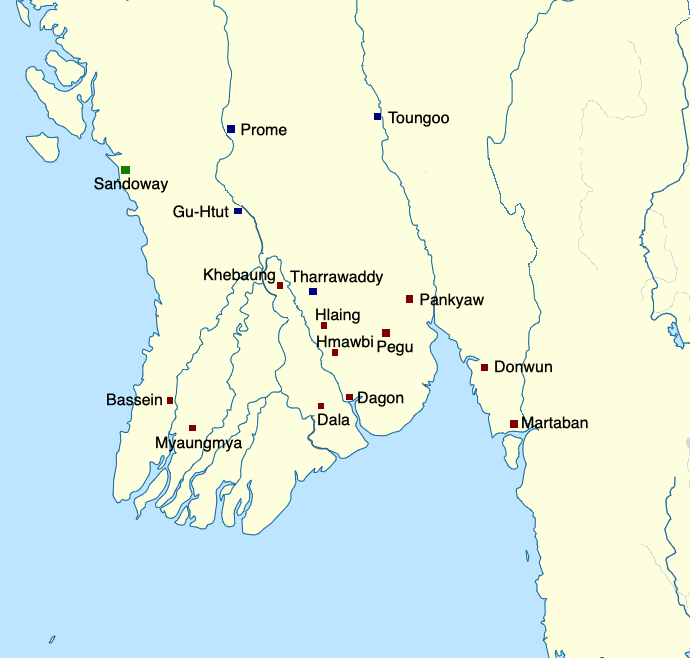
Key locations in the Ava–Hanthawaddy War (1385–1391)

In 1385, the king ordered his two eldest sons to lead a two-pronged invasion of the southern kingdom in what would become known as the Forty Years' War. Tarabya commanded the First Army (7000 infantry, 500 cavalry, 20 elephants) while Swe led the Second Army (6000 infantry, 500 cavalry, 20 elephants). The two princes were advised by Ava's best commanders, including Thilawa of Yamethin and Theinkhathu Saw Hnaung. The Ava command expected an easy victory over an overpowered opponent. But Ava forces could not break through well-organized Peguan defenses for five months. Then, King Razadarit of Hanthawaddy made a tactical error by coming out of his fortified capital to attack Ava positions near Pankyaw. Tarabya's army pounced, driving back and pursuing Razadarit's army. Meanwhile Swe's army had positioned in the path of retreat of the Hanthawaddy army. Tarabya, the overall commander-in-chief, sent a messenger, ordering Swe to hold his position and not to engage Razadarit until his army could reach the scene. But Swe ignored the order and the advice of his seasoned commanders, and ordered his troops to engage. Razadarit's army defeated Swe's premature attack, and got back inside Pegu. Five days later, with the rainy season approaching, the invasion was called off.

Ava would come to rue the missed opportunity. Swa kept Swe from the next invasion in the following dry season. Swe was assigned to guard the capital while Swa and Tarabya invaded the southern country again. The second invasion fared no better. Razadarit committed no more errors, and hunkered down. Ava troops could not break through Pegu's defenses and had to retreat before the rainy season arrived. Swe was to get his chance again to go to the front in the 1390–91 campaign. But this time, he commanded just a regiment, and was directly under the command of Tarabya. At any rate, their army could not break through the Pegu defenses at Pankyaw although the campaign ended in a truce.

== Marriage ==
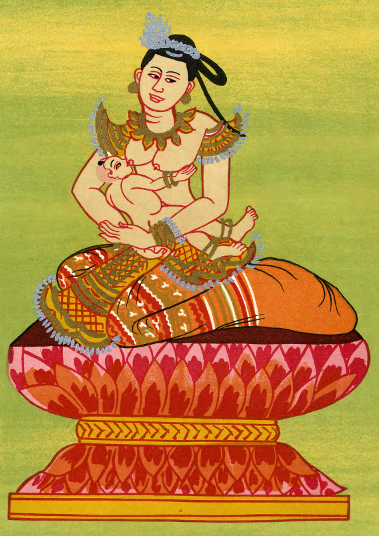
Shin Mi-Nauk portrayed as the Anauk Mibaya nat

In 1389/90, Swe was married to Princess Shin Mi-Nauk, daughter of the chief of Mohnyin, in a marriage of state. The marriage was part of the effort by Ava and Mohnyin to mend their fences after the 1387–88 war between the two states. On the advice of Chief Minister Min Yaza, King Swa selected Swe to marry Mi-Nauk. While the peace with Mohnyin did not last—Ava and Mohnyin were to fight another war just three years later—the marriage between Swe and Mi-Nauk lasted. The couple had four children at Pyinzi: Minye Kyawswa, Saw Pyei Chantha, Minye Thihathu and Minye Kyawhtin.

== Accession ==
In April 1400, King Swa Saw Ke died and Tarabya ascended the throne. The new king kept his two half brothers at an arm's length. Neither Swe nor Theiddat controlled a sizable army. When Tarabya became mentally unstable about five months into his reign, and other pretenders began circling the throne, Swe was not in a strong-enough position to challenge them. Soon after, Gov. Thihapate of Tagaung assassinated Tarabya, and tried to seize the throne. But the court executed the usurper, and offered the throne to Min Swe. But Swe was concerned about Gov. Maha Pyauk of Yamethin, who controlled a sizable army, and told the court to offer the throne to Pyauk instead. Theiddat implored Swe to reconsider. When his brother still refused, Theiddat took matters into his own hand. Theiddat and his small band of men ambushed Pyauk's much bigger army near Ava while Pyauk was not expecting. Pyauk was killed. Min Swe had been proclaimed king by 25 November 1400 (or 26 October 1400). (Note: Minkhaung's accession date is conventionally translated as 25 November 1400. According to Michael Aung-Thwin following (Tin Hla Thaw, History of Burma, 1959: 136), the inscription on which Minkhaung's accession date was found is recorded in the volume 4 of Shay-haung Myanmar Kyauk-sa-mya [SMK] (Ancient Stone Inscriptions of Myanmar, Vol. 4, p. 221). According to (SMK Vol. 4 1998: 220–221, lines 7, 12), the inscription—founded in 762 ME at the Yan Aung-Myin Pagoda, in Tada-U Township—states that the Great Lord Anawrahta Saw [Minkhaung] in his 28th year [aged 27] ascended the throne on the tha-tin (သတင်) day in the waxing half of the month of Nadaw in the Arthat (Ashadha) year of 762 [ME]. Than Tun translated the date as 25 November 1400, which would be the 9th waxing of Nadaw 762 ME, apparently treating 762 ME as a great leap year. If 762 ME were a regular year, the 9th waxing of Nadaw 762 ME would translate to Tuesday, 26 October 1400.) He assumed the title of Minkhaung (မင်းခေါင်; "Foremost Lord" or "Paramount Lord").

== Early reign ==
=== Consolidation of power ===
Minkhaung spent his first year consolidating his power. He kept Min Yaza as chief minister, and appointed Yaza's son Pauk Hla governor Yamethin, and Yaza's son-in-law Thado Theinkhathu governor of Badon and Tabayin. He also appointed Theiddat governor of Sagaing with the title of Thiri Zeya Thura but stopped short of declaring him his heir-apparent. While Sagaing was a sizable province that used to be an independent kingdom, the younger brother was never satisfied with the reward, and held a "lingering resentment that would later rear its ugly head".

=== Invasion by Pegu (1401–03) ===
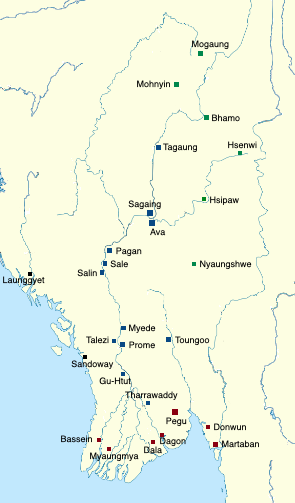
Hanthawaddy forces attacked Ava territories from Tharrawaddy to Tagaung in 1401–1402, and up to Prome in 1402–1403.

The succession crisis at Ava did not go unnoticed. The Arakanese raided western Irrawaddy towns. In Pegu, King Razadarit assessed that Minkhaung's hold on power was still weak, and planned to place a nominee of his own. It would be payback for Ava's attempts to dislodge him early in his reign. Throughout 1401, Razadarit prepared an invasion river-borne fleet that could transport not only troops but even horses and elephants. When the dry season began, Hanthawaddy forces invaded by the Irrawaddy river, attacking all the riverside towns and cities, including their main targets, Prome (Pyay) and Ava (Inwa).

The Forty Year's War had resumed after a 10-year hiatus. Initially, Hanthawaddy held the advantage. Ava did not have a navy that could challenge Pegu's massive flotilla. Ava forces had to defend inside the fortified towns along the river: Prome, Myede, Sagu, Salin, Pakhan Nge, Salay, Pagan (Bagan), Talok, Pakhan Gyi, Sagaing and Ava. The Pegu navy held complete control of the Irrawaddy (as far north as Tagaung) but the blockades were not enough to force a surrender. Minkhaung bought time by sending a delegation led by a learned Buddhist monk, Shin Zawtayanta, to broker a truce. The monk delivered a sermon that Razadarit used as a pretense to withdraw from Ava. Minkhaung's vassals now rallied around him. He was able to assemble a sizable force, which he sent after the rainy season to relieve Prome. The Ava army decisively defeated the invaders south of Prome on 26 December 1402, forcing Pegu to ask for terms about ten days after the battle.

Minkhaung sent an embassy led by Min Yaza to Pegu to negotiate a treaty. He wanted to exact a price from Pegu. After five months of negotiations, the two sides signed a peace treaty. The boundary of their kingdoms was fixed a little to the south of Prome. Pegu agreed to share the customs revenue of Bassein (Pathein), and supply 30 elephants annually. In return, Minkhaung sent his only sister Thupaba Dewi to be queen of Razadarit in a marriage alliance.

=== Expansion ===
==== Cis-Salween Shan states (1404–1406) ====
Minkhaung had come out far stronger from the war. What began as an existential threat to his rule had turned to an agreement that was largely in his favor. In the following years, the king, with the advice of Min Yaza, resumed the expansionist policy of his father in order to restore the Pagan Empire. His first targets were the nearer (cis-Salween) Shan states. According to the Burmese chronicles, the acquisition drive was largely peaceful, and accomplished through diplomatic missions led by Min Yaza to Onbaung (Hsipaw) in 1404/05, Nyaungshwe in 1405/06 and Mohnyin in 1406. (Note: Chronicles (Yazawin Thit Vol. 1 2012: 224–225) and (Hmannan Vol. 1 2003: 445–446, 467) say that Nyaungshwe and Mohnyin submitted in 767 ME (1405/06) and 768 ME (1406/07) respectively. According to Ming records, per (Fernquest Autumn 2006: 51), Ava had acquired Bhamo, Mohnyin, and Kalay by 25 August 1406.) But the Ming records say that Ava's missions were in fact military expeditions, and that the Ming court became especially concerned after Ava's capture of Mohnyin in 1406 that killed the sawbwa of Mohnyin and his son. On 25 August 1406, the Ming court sent an embassy to Ava to end the "aggression" against the Shan states.

Minkhaung initially brushed off the Chinese concerns. It was not until 1408 when he was about to resume the war with Pegu that he sent an embassy to Nanjing. The Ming records say that the Ava representative offered a formal apology to the emperor for "having occupied" the Ming vassals "without authority" on 28 May 1408; but despite the promise, Ava was encouraging Hsenwi to rebel against the Ming in 1408–1409. By September 1409, the Ming court was considering a punitive action against Ava. The simmering tensions would lead to war between Ava and Ming China between 1412 and 1415.

==== Arakan (1406) ====
Despite Chinese concerns, by August 1406, Ava had gained allegiance of all of its surrounding Shan states. Minkhaung now eyed Arakan. The western kingdom was a tributary of Ava between 1373/74 and 1385/86 during his father's reign but escaped Ava's orbit at the start of the Forty Years' War. Using alleged Arakanese raids on Ava's western districts, he sent a 10,000-strong army led by his eldest son Minye Kyawswa to Arakan. On 29 November 1406, (Note: (RRT Vol. 2 1999: 9): Monday, 5th waning of Nadaw 768 ME = Monday, 29 November 1406.) Ava forces took the Arakanese capital Launggyet, and Min Saw Mon fled to Bengal. Minkhaung appointed Gov. Anawrahta of Kalay king of Arakan.

=== Heir-apparent selection and its fallout ===
After Arakan, Minkhaung was riding high. He was greatly impressed by his son's performance, and wanted to make him his heir apparent. With the advice of Min Yaza, he sent away Tarabya's eldest son and potential rival to the throne Prince Min Nyo to Kalay, a frontier state by the Manipur border, as governor. He tried to appease his brother Theiddat, governor of Sagaing, by giving him command of the Northern Cavalry. The king then appointed Minye Kyawswa his heir apparent, (Note: Chronicles do not agree on when Minye Kyawswa became crown prince. (Maha Yazawin Vol. 2 2006: 33–34) says he was appointed crown prince in late 773 ME (early 1412) after the second Arakan campaign of 1411–1412. But (Yazawin Thit Vol. 1 2012: 225–226) and (Hmannan Vol. 1 2003: 471) say the appointment came after the first Arakan campaign, in 768 ME (1406/07).) and married him to Saw Min Hla, a cousin of the groom.

Theiddat felt totally betrayed. The younger brother bitterly complained that Minkhaung would not have become king were it not for him. Min Yaza tried to but could not mollify Theiddat. Minkhaung had Theiddat arrested but later released him after Min Yaza intervened. Shortly after, Theiddat fled to Pegu in 1407.

== Middle reign ==
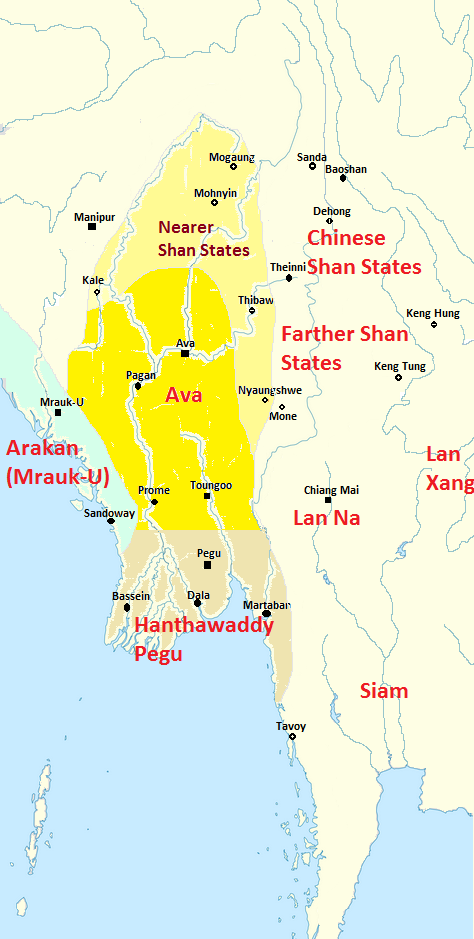
Political map of Burma in the 15th century

=== Deterioration of relations with Pegu ===
Far more than Ming China, Pegu viewed Ava's acquisition spree with great alarm. Realizing that Pegu was now Ava's only remaining target, Razadarit decided to act. He readily gave shelter to Theiddat although he knew such an action would be regarded as a declaration of war against Ava. He broke the 1403 agreement: Pegu stopped sending the annual shipment of 30 elephants and Ava's share of customs revenue of the Bassein port.

Meanwhile, Minkhaung tried to solidify his hold over Arakan by sending his eldest daughter Saw Pyei Chantha to be the wife of Anawrahta as well as a senior minister to aid the vassal king. He also sent an embassy to Chiang Mai, and a long overdue mission to China in early 1408. According to the Razadarit Ayedawbon chronicle, Razadarit viewed Ava's mission to Chiang Mai as an attempt by Ava to secure its rear, and decided that war was inevitable.

=== Resumption of war with Pegu (1408–1410) ===
In March 1408, (Note: (Yazawin Thit Vol. 1 2012: 228, 235): Late Tagu 769 ME = 25 February 1408 to 24 March 1408) Razadarit sent in an invasion force to Arakan, catching Ava completely by surprise. Its forces had been deployed in the north. The Ava court had not expected Pegu to act first, or an attack on Arakan. Before Ava could send any help, Pegu forces took Launggyet by late March/early April 1408. (Note: Chronicles reports slightly different dates for Pegu's takeover of Launggyet. (Maha Yazawin Vol. 1 2006: 334) says Pegu forces had taken Arakan by Kason 770 ME (29 March 1408 to 23 April 1408); (Yazawin Thit Vol. 1 2012: 228) gives Late Tagu 969 ME (25 February 1408 to 24 March 1408); (Hmannan Vol. 1 2003: 477) gives Late Kason 769 ME (25 to 28 March 1408).) Razadarit had Minkhaung's son-in-law Anawrahta executed, and raised Minkhaung's daughter Pyei Chantha as his queen. Minkhaung was furious. Although the rainy season was just a month away, the king ordered an immediate invasion of the south, overruling his ministers' suggestion to wait until the dry season.

In May 1408, Minkhaung himself led two armies (26,000 men, 2200 horses, 100 elephants), and invaded the southern country. What ensued was a complete disaster. Predictably, Ava forces got bogged down in the swamps of Lower Burma. Three months into the invasion, Ava's troops were running out of supplies due to bad weather as well as Hanthawaddy ambushes on supply lines. For his part, Razadarit could not match Ava's manpower, and ordered two attempts on Minkhaung's life. The first attempt by Hanthawaddy special forces to ambush Minkhaung's small contingent was broken up on the warning by Theiddat who was with the Peguan forces. It turned out that Theiddat could not betray his elder brother. Razadarit had Theiddat executed for the warning. The second attempt nearly succeeded. Razadarit sent a team of commandos led by his top general Lagun Ein to infiltrate the enemy camp. Lagun Ein got inside Minkhaung's tent but refused to kill a sleeping Minkhaung.

At any rate, Ava forces retreated c. August 1408. Razadarit came out and attacked the retreating troops. Ava forces were routed, and Minkhaung's queen Mi-Nauk was captured. Razadarit now had both the mother and the daughter in his harem. Razadarit attempted to pick off Prome by launching an attack on the city on 22 November 1408 but the attack faltered.

Minkhaung was forced to regroup. In December 1409, he again invaded with two armies (14,000 men, 1400 horses, 100 elephants). His armies again could not break through. Five months into the invasion c. May 1410, Razadarit counterattacked. Near Tharrawaddy, Razadarit and Minkhaung faced in battle over elephants, and the Hanthawaddy king drove back Minkhaung. The remaining Ava army was routed; several infantry, cavalry and elephants were captured.

=== Multi-front war (1410–1415) ===
After the two consecutive disastrous defeats, a dejected Minkhaung handed over the military leadership to Minye Kyawswa. His eldest son was eager to have a chance to take on Razadarit who held both his mother and sister in his harem. Over the next five years, Minkhaung would call on Minye Kyawswa to wage war against his enemies on multiple fronts: against Hanthawaddy in both Lower Burma and Arakan, and against Ming China and its vassal states in the north. His son proved a gifted commander, and Ava would come closest to reassembling the Pagan Empire.

==== Lower Burma and Arakan (1410–1412) ====
Minye Kyawswa brought a fresh thinking to Ava's battle plan. Instead of directly attacking the well-defended Pegu capital region, he would attack what he believed were less defended regions. In late 1410, the prince invaded the Irrawaddy delta by river and land with an army (7000 men, 600 horses, and 40 elephants) and a navy that transported 7000 men. Combined Ava forces proceeded to attack the key delta cities of Myaungmya and Bassein (Pathein). But the prince found that the key delta cities were well fortified and prepared for long sieges. He pulled back his forces to Prome, and invaded Arakan in early 1411. There, he successfully drove out Pegu-installed vassals, and appointed Ava's commanders as governor-generals.

Meanwhile, Razadarit sought an alliance with Hsenwi in an attempt to open a second front. After the rainy season of 1411, the Hanthawaddy king sent two armies to Arakan. The Ava garrison at Sandoway fell before Ava reinforcements (8000 troops, 300 horses, 30 elephants) led by Minye Kyawswa arrived. Ava forces laid siege to the city for the next three months. But Hsenwi opened a new front by invading Ava territory in the north. The invasion was considered serious enough that Minkhaung recalled Minye Kyawswa from Arakan. After the withdrawal, reinforced Hanthawaddy troops went on to drive out the Ava garrison at Launggyet in 1412. (According to the Arakanese chronicle Rakhine Razawin Thit, Ava retained a toehold at the Khway-thin-taung garrison in northern Arakan until 1416/17. But Ava would not send a major force to Arakan, and the western state would remain a Hanthawaddy vassal at least until Razadarit's death.)

==== Hsenwi (1412) ====
Hsenwi's invasion was not just due to Hanthawaddy's urging. The powerful Shan state had been ordered by the Ming court to retaliate against Ava's annexation of Mohnyin six years earlier. It is unclear if Minkhaung and his court realized the gravity of the situation. Even if they did, their actions show they were not concerned about an escalating war against Ming-backed states in their northern border. Minkhaung was determined to teach Hsenwi a lesson. After Minye Kyawswa decisively defeated the Hsenwi force near Wetwin (present-day Pyin Oo Lwin), the king agreed to a plan to attack Hsenwi itself.

Minye Kyawswa went on to lay siege to the city of Hsenwi throughout the rainy season of 1412. The Yunnan government sent an army (20,000 men and 2000 cavalry) to relieve the siege. The Ava army then ambushed the larger Chinese army as they came out of the forest. The Chinese army was driven back. Five Chinese commanders, 2000 troops and 1000 horses were taken prisoner. Ava wanted to finish off Hsenwi and the siege went on for one more month until c. November 1412. But Pegu came to Hsenwi's aid this time by launching a massive attack on Prome after the rainy season. The attack was serious enough that Minkhaung himself marched with his army to relieve Prome, and ordered Minye Kyawswa to join him on the southern front. (Note: In Binnya Dala's Burmese language version of the Razadarit Ayedawbon chronicle, Razadarit marched to Prome on the 5th waxing of Nadaw 770 ME (27 November 1408). The 770 ME is an error. According to the main chronicles, the invasion of the south after Hsenwi was in 774 ME.)

==== Lower Burma (1412–1413) ====
Over the next four months the father-son team tried to break the Hanthawaddy siege of Prome. They made no meaningful progress until when the Hanthawaddy command suddenly lost its two most senior generals: Gen. Byat Za (natural causes) and Gen. Lagun Ein (KIA). Shaken by the deaths, Razadarit hastily retreated. Minye Kyawswa proposed an immediate invasion of the south. Minkhaung was weary but allowed his son to carry out the plan. In April 1413, Minye Kyawswa took eastern delta towns of Dala–Twante and Dagon. But the Ava advance was halted at the battle of Hmawbi in which Gen. Letya Pyanchi of Prome was mortally wounded. Minkhaung ordered a pause as it was just a month away from the rainy season and the army did not have enough strength. The crown prince ignored his father's order, and resumed the march to Pegu in May 1413. (Note: (Yazawin Thit Vol. 1 2012: 244–245): Nayon 775 ME (30 April 1413 to 28 May 1413).) But the Hanthawaddy defenses stopped Ava forces outside Dala and at Syriam. The fighting paused during the rainy season of 1413. Razadarit again sent emissaries to northern Shan states and Lan Na in search of alliances.

==== Northern Burma and Maw (1413–1414) ====
Ava's northern front was never quiet after the siege of Hsenwi. According to the Ming Shilu, the Yongle Emperor ordered another attack on Ava. In 1413, while the main Ava armies were in the south, Chinese-backed Hsenwi forces raided Ava's northern territories, destroying "over 20 cities and stockades". The captured elephants, horses, and other goods were presented at the Chinese capital in September 1413. According to the Burmese chronicles, the attack on Myedu was carried out by another Shan state, Maw (Mong Mao/Mawdon Mawke). As usual, Minkhaung recalled Minye Kyawswa to Ava, and sent his middle son Minye Thihathu to Prome to take over the southern command. At Ava, Minye Kyawswa marched north to take on the Maw forces. His forces defeated Maw forces at Myedu, and chased the enemy to the Chinese border.

==== Lower Burma (1414–1415) ====
The Ava command apparently considered the victory in the north decisive. Although the Chinese would be back later, Minkhaung and the court now blithely planned a full scale invasion of the south. Ava had collected a large invasion force: an army consisted of 8000 men, 200 horses and 80 elephants, and a navy consisting of 13,000 men, and over 1800 ships of all sizes. In October 1414, Minye Kyawswa launched the invasion of the western Irrawaddy delta. Although Hanthawaddy forces put up a spirited defense, Ava forces had gained complete control of the delta by the end of December. Razadarit evacuated Pegu, and moved to Martaban (Mottama). The Ava command planned a pincer movement on Pegu from Toungoo and from Dala. But the attack on Pegu would be delayed as the Chinese forces invaded from the north. Minkhaung managed to send an army which forced the Chinese army to retreat. (Note: (Fernquest Autumn 2006: 53–54): Ming records do not provide any details about the expedition. The Burmese chronicles (Hmannan Vol. 2 2003: 28–29) say that when the Ava army and the Chinese army met, both sides agreed to a duel on horseback. Smin Bayan, who had entered Ava's service, defeated the Chinese commander, after which the Chinese army retreated.)

The Chinese attack provided a much-needed breathing room for Razadarit. He was back in Pegu and planning counterattack by February 1415. (Note: (Yazawin Thit Vol. 1 2012: 253): Tabodwe 776 ME = 10 January 1415 to 7 February 1415) On 2 March 1415, Razadarit himself led the army to the Dala front. (Note: (Yazawin Thit Vol. 1 2012: 256): Full moon of Tabaung 776 ME = 22 February 1415; 8th waning of Tabaung 776 ME = 2 March 1415) On 13 March 1415, the two armies fought at Dala–Twante in one of the most famous battles in Burmese military history. Minye Kyawswa was mortally wounded in the battle. Minkhaung immediately came down with an army, and exhumed his son's body from where Razadarit had given it honorable burial. The remains were solemnly dropped into the waters near Twante. After rampaging through the delta, Minkhaung called off the invasion and left.

== Late reign ==
Minkhaung was totally heartbroken by his eldest son's death. He recalled Thihathu from Prome, and appointed him heir apparent. The war went on languidly for two more campaigns. In 1416–1417, Razadarit tried to pick off Toungoo (Taungoo) but was defeated. In the following dry season, Minkhaung ordered a retaliatory invasion. Ava forces led by Thihathu took the delta, and again forced Razadarit to move to Martaban. They remained in the south for nearly a year. But they could not break through towards Pegu, and had to retreat. It was the last campaign during Minkhaung's reign.

The king spent his last years in piety. He died c. October 1421. (Note: The approximate date of death based on Yazawin Thit and Razadarit Ayedawbon chronicles. (Yazawin Thit Vol. 1 2012: 264–265) says that Minkhaung died in his 49th year (at age 48) in 783 ME (30 March 1421 to 29 March 1422), and that Razadarit died about two months after Minkhaung in the same calendar year (783 ME). This means Minkhaung died between his 48th birthday on the 12th waning of Thadingyut 783 ME (22 September 1421) and the last day of 783 ME (29 March 1422). Razadarit Ayedawbon (Pan Hla 2005: 356) says Razadarit died in 783 ME in his 54th year. This means Razadarit died before his 54th birthday on 8th waxing of Tabodwe 783 ME (30 December 1421). Because Minkhaung died about two months before Razadarit, he most probably had died by October 1421 and Razadarit about December 1421.) His nemesis Razadarit is said to have lamented when he heard the news of Minkhaung's death. Razadarit died about two months later.

== Administration ==
Minkhaung heavily relied on the advice of his court led by Chief Minister Min Yaza. He continued to employ Pagan's administrative model of solar polities in which the high king ruled the core while semi-independent tributaries, autonomous viceroys, and governors actually controlled day-to-day administration and manpower.

Rulers of Key Vassal States
Vassal state	Region	Ruler (duration in office)	Notes
Pagan (Bagan)	Core	Uzana III (by 1380/81–1413); Tarabya I (1413–c. 1433)	
Myinsaing	Core	Thray Sithu (c. 1386–1426)	
Mekkhaya	Core	?	
Pinle	Core	Thray Thinkhaya (1386?–1427)	Thray Thinkhaya was still in office in 1423
Pyinzi	Core	Nandathingyan (c. 1401–1411/12); Letya Zeya Thingyan (1412–1426)	
Pakhan	Core	Tarabya I (by 1390–1413); Tarabya II (Minye Kyawhtin) (1413–1426)	
Paukmyaing	Core	Sithu (1400−?)	
Talok	Core	Yazathu of Talok (c. 1383/84–1413 or later)	
Wadi	Core	Thinkhaya	
Sagaing	North	Theiddat (1400–1407); Thihathu (1408–1413); Yazathingyan (1413–1450)	
Amyint	North	Tuyin Theinzi? (c. 1380–1400s?); Yazathingyan (1408–1413)	
Singu	North	Letwe?; Baya Gamani (1401–1426, 1427–c. 1450)	
Kale (Kalay)	North	Min Chay-To (1400–c. 1406); Anawrahta (1406); Min Nyo (1406–1425)	
Mohnyin	North	vacant (1406–1410); Thado (1410–1427)	
Myedu	North	Thettawshay (by 1413–1415); Ottama Thiri Zeya Nawrahta (1415?–?)	Ottama Thiri Zeya Nawrahta was governor by 1421.
Onbaung	Northeast	Tho Kyaung Bwa (1404/05–1420s?); Le Than Bwa (1420s?–1459/60)	
Nyaungshwe	East	Htaw Hmaing Gyi (1405/06–?)	
Yamethin	Mid	Sithu (1400–1413); Sithu Thihapate (1413–?)	Son of Min Yaza of Wun Zin; Also known as Sithu the Younger
Taungdwin	Mid	Thihapate II ("Thettawshay Thihapate") (by 1364–c. 1401); Thihapate III (c. 1401–1441)	
Nyaungyan	Mid	Tuyin Ponnya (by 1390–1408?); Baya Kyawhtin II (by 1408–1423 or later)	Tuyin Ponnya reappointed to office in 1400; Baya Kyawhtin was still governor in 1423.
Sagu	Mid	Theinkhathu II (?–1402 or later); Thiri Zeya Kyawhtin (after 1402–1412); Khin Ba (1413–?)	
Salin	Mid	Nawrahta (1390–1426)	
Prome (Pyay)	South	Letya Pyanchi (1390–1413); Sokkate (1413); Minye Kyawswa (1413); Thihathu (1413–1416)	
Toungoo (Taungoo)	South	Min Nemi (1399–1408/09); Letya Zeya Thingyan (1408/09–1411/12); Thinkhaya I (1411/12–1415); Thinkhaya II (1415–1418/19); Pantaung (1419–1420); Thinkhaya III (1420–1435)	
Launggyet (Arakan)	West	Anawrahta (1406–1408); Thray Sithu (1408–1409); Letya Zeya Thingyan (North Arakan) (1411–1412); Sokkate (South Arakan) (1411)	Minkhaung's son-in-law; Viceroy for a few months in 1408–1409; Governor of North Arakan (Launggyet); Governor of South Arakan (Sandoway)

== Family ==
Chronicles state that Minkhaung had five senior queens.

Family of King Minkhaung
Queen	Rank	Issue	Reference
Shin Saw of Ava	Chief queen	unknown	
Saw Khway	Queen of the Northern Palace	unknown	
Min Pyan	Queen of the Middle Palace	unknown	
Shin Mi-Nauk	Queen of the Western Palace (r. 1400−1408)	Minye Kyawswa; Saw Pyei Chantha; Thihathu; Minye Kyawhtin	
Shin Bo-Me	Queen of the Western Palace (r. 1408−1421?); Queen of Southern Palace?	none	(Note: (Yazawin Thit Vol. 1 2012: 265) says Bo-Me was Queen of the Southern Palace. However, a 1409 stone inscription donated by Shin Saw of Ava states that Shin Saw was the chief queen and her two other sisters Saw Khway and Min Pyan were principal queens. If Bo-Me did become the chief queen, it must be later than 1409.)
Min Hla Myat	Junior queen wife of Tarabya of Ava	none	
Shin Myat Hla	Junior queen married only for five months (1409–10)	none	

One of his concubines, Saw Pan-Gon, gave birth to a daughter named Saw Nant-Tha, who was later married to his nephew Prince Min Nyo of Kale Kye-Taung.

== Historiography ==
Historiography
Source	Birth–Death	Age	Reign	Length of reign	Reference
Zatadawbon Yazawin (List of Kings of Ava Section)	c. 16 October 1369 – 1423; Tuesday born	53 (54th year)	1401 – 1423	22	(Note: (Zata 1960: 46): Tuesday, 8th month (Tazaungmon) of 731 ME (1 to 30 October 1369))
Zatadawbon Yazawin (Horoscopes Section)	c. 23 September 1382 [sic] – early 1422; Tuesday born	53 (54th year)	1401 – early 1422	22 [sic]	(Note: (Zata 1960: 73): Minkhaung was born on Tuesday, 15th nekkhat of 7th month (Thadingyut) of 744 ME [sic]. Minkhaung's reign is derived from the horoscope for Tarabya per (Zata 1960: 73), which says Tarabya died in 1401, and that for Thihathu per (Zata 1960: 74) which says Thihathu came to power in 783 ME (1421/22).)
Maha Yazawin	c. 1373 – 1422/23; Tuesday born	49 (50th year)	June 1401 – 1422/23	21	(Note: (Maha Yazawin Vol. 1 2006: 305) and (Maha Yazawin Vol. 2 2006: 55))
Mani Yadanabon	c. 1369 – 1422/23	53 (54th year)	1400/01 – 1422/23	22	(Note: (Mani Yadanabon 2009: 65): King Tarabya ascended the throne in 762 ME (29 March 1400 to 28 March 1401), and was assassinated 5 months and 7 days later. (Mani Yadanabon 2009: 67): King Minkhaung became king, also in 762 ME, (implying sometime between August 1400 and March 1401). (Mani Yadanabon 2009: 181): Minkhaung died in 784 ME (1422/23) in his 54th year (at age 53), having reigned 22 years.)
Yazawin Thit	c. 1373 – 1421/22; Tuesday born	48 (49th year)	in or after September 1400 – 1421/22	21	(Note: Tarabya became king in 762 ME (29 March 1400 to 28 March 1401), and was assassinated after 5 months. Minkhaung ascended the throne after a brief period of power struggle, meaning Minkhaung came to power in or after September 1400. Minkhaung became king in his 28th year (aged 27), reigned 21 years, and died in his 49th year (aged 48) in 783 ME.)
Hmannan Yazawin	c. 1373 – 1421/22; Tuesday born	48 (49th year)	June 1401 – 1421/22; Tuesday born	21 [sic]	(Note: (Hmannan Vol. 1 2003: 436, 439) and (Hmannan Vol. 2 2003: 51–52). Mixing Maha Yazawin's reign dates with Yazawin Thit's age of 48 (49th year).)
Inscriptions	13 September 1373 – ?	?	by 25 November 1400 – ?		

== Bibliography ==
- Aung-Thwin, Michael A. (2017). Myanmar in the Fifteenth Century. Honolulu: University of Hawai'i Press. ISBN 978-0-8248-6783-6.
- Goh, Geok Yian (2009). Connecting and Distancing: Southeast Asia and China. Institute of Southeast Asian. ISBN 9789812308566.
- Fernquest, Jon (Spring 2006). "Rajadhirat's Mask of Command: Military Leadership in Burma (c. 1348–1421)" (PDF). SBBR. 4 (1).
- Fernquest, Jon (Autumn 2006). "Crucible of War: Burma and the Ming in the Tai Frontier Zone (1382–1454)" (PDF). SOAS Bulletin of Burma Research. 4 (2).
- Harvey, G. E. (1925). History of Burma: From the Earliest Times to 10 March 1824. London: Frank Cass & Co. Ltd.
- Htin Aung, Maung (1967). A History of Burma. New York and London: Cambridge University Press.
- Kala, U (2006) [1724]. Maha Yazawin (in Burmese). Vol. 1–3 (4th printing ed.). Yangon: Ya-Pyei Publishing.
- Maha Sithu (2012) [1798]. Myint Swe; Kyaw Win; Thein Hlaing (eds.). Yazawin Thit (in Burmese). Vol. 1–3 (2nd printing ed.). Yangon: Ya-Pyei Publishing.
- Nyein Maung, ed. (1972–1998). Shay-haung Myanma Kyauksa-mya [Ancient Burmese Stone Inscriptions] (in Burmese). Vol. 1–5. Yangon: Archaeological Department.
- Royal Historians of Burma (1960) [c. 1680]. U Hla Tin (Hla Thamein) (ed.). Zatadawbon Yazawin. Historical Research Directorate of the Union of Burma.
- Royal Historical Commission of Burma (2003) [1832]. Hmannan Yazawin (in Burmese). Vol. 1–3. Yangon: Ministry of Information, Myanmar.
- Sandalinka, Shin (2009) [1781]. Mani Yadanabon (in Burmese) (4th printing ed.). Yangon: Seit-Ku Cho Cho.
- Sandamala Linkara, Ashin (1997–1999) [1931]. Rakhine Razawin Thit (in Burmese). Vol. 1–2. Yangon: Tetlan Sarpay.
- Than Tun (December 1959). "History of Burma: A.D. 1300–1400". Journal of Burma Research Society. XLII (II).

Minkhaung I Ava Kingdom Born: 13 September 1373 Died: c. October 1421
Regnal titles
Preceded by Tarabya	King of Ava by 25 November 1400 – c. October 1421	Succeeded by Thihathu
Royal titles
New title	Governor of Pyinzi c. April 1385 – 25 November 1400	Succeeded by Nandathingyan
