= Sithu Kyawhtin of Toungoo =

Sithu Kyawhtin of Toungoo တောင်ငူ စည်သူကျော်ထင်

Viceroy of Toungoo
- Reign: 1470–1481
- Predecessor: Letya Zala Thingyan
- Successor: Min Sithu
- Born: c. early 1410s (Sunday born); Ava (Inwa); Ava Kingdom
- Died: 1481; 843 ME near Yamethin; Ava Kingdom
- Spouse: Min Hla Htut of Pyakaung; Princess of Pakhan
- Issue: Min Sithu (son); Min Hla Nyet (daughter); Min Htwe (daughter)
- Father: Sithu of Paukmyaing
- Religion: Theravada Buddhism

Sithu Kyawhtin of Toungoo (Burmese: တောင်ငူ စည်သူကျော်ထင်, pronounced [sìðù tɕɔ̀dɪ̀ɰ̃]; died 1481) was Viceroy of Toungoo from 1470 to 1481, and a general in the Ava military. He was the maternal grandfather of Mingyi Nyo, the founder of Toungoo Dynasty of Myanmar. He was a son-in-law of Crown Prince Minye Kyawswa of the Forty Years' War fame.

== Brief ==
In 1470, King Thihathura of Ava assigned Gen. Sithu Kyawhtin to put down a rebellion by Toungoo, which had also called in help from Hanthawaddy Pegu. Sithu Kyawhtin led the army and was accompanied by two of the king's sons. The Ava army defeated Toungoo. The princes carried the rebellious governor of Toungoo off to Ava, and left Sithu Kyawhtin as the head of the troublesome province. Sithu Kyawhtin soon acted like a sovereign king of this remote region. In 1476, Sithu Kyawhtin enlarged the city of Toungoo, raising suspicions of some ministers at Ava. When news of this reached the king's ear, Sithu Kyawhtin was brought to Ava forcibly by pulling on his hair in a humiliating manner to demonstrate his obedience and loyalty to the king.

In 1480, Thihathura died, and the Ava throne was succeeded by his elder son Minkhaung II. The new king was promptly greeted by rebellions by his two brothers. Minkhaung II ordered Sithu Kyawhtin to attack Yamethin, one of the rebellious towns. Sithu Kyawhtin marched straight to Yamethin and without waiting for the reinforcements from Ava engaged the Yamethin troops in a pitched battle. He overcame the first wave of troops sent out of the town walls to meet them but his troops were defeated by the second wave and died in battle.

== Bibliography ==
- Harvey, G. E. (1925). History of Burma: From the Earliest Times to 10 March 1824. London: Frank Cass & Co. Ltd.
- Phayre, Lt. Gen. Sir Arthur P. (1967) [1883]. History of Burma. London: Susil Gupta.
- Kala, U (2006) [1724]. Maha Yazawin (in Burmese). Vol. 1–3 (4th printing ed.). Yangon: Ya-Pyei Publishing.
- Maha Sithu (2012) [1798]. Myint Swe; Kyaw Win; Thein Hlaing (eds.). Yazawin Thit (in Burmese). Vol. 1–3 (2nd printing ed.). Yangon: Ya-Pyei Publishing.
- Royal Historical Commission of Burma (2003) [1832]. Hmannan Yazawin (in Burmese). Vol. 1–3. Yangon: Ministry of Information, Myanmar.

Sithu Kyawhtin of Toungoo Ava Kingdom Born: 1410s Died: 1481
Royal titles
Preceded by Letya Zala Thingyan	Viceroy of Toungoo; 1470–1481	Succeeded by Min Sithu
