= Tagu =

First month of the Burmese calendar

Tagu (Burmese: တန်ခူး; Mon: ဂိတု စဲ) is the first month of the traditional Burmese calendar.

== Holidays and observances ==
- Thingyan
- Pagoda festivals
  - Shwemawdaw Pagoda Festival, Bago

== Tagu symbols ==
- Flower: Mesua ferrea
- Astrological sign: Aries

== See also ==
- Burmese calendar
- Festivals of Burma
