= Ava–Hanthawaddy War (1422–1423) orders of battle =

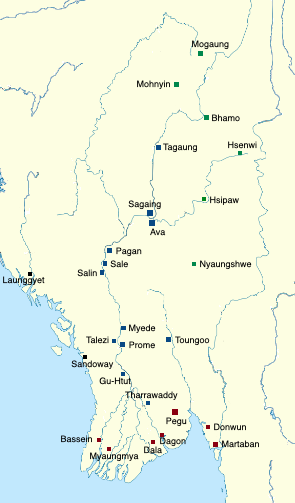
Ava forces invaded the south two times in 1422 and 1422–1423.

This is a list of orders of battle for the Ava–Hanthawaddy War (1422–1423).

== Background ==
=== Sources ===
The orders of battles in this article are sourced from the main royal chronicles—the Maha Yazawin, the Yazawin Thit and the Hmannan Yazawin, which primarily narrate the war from the Ava side. (Note: See (Maha Yazawin Vol. 2 2006: 57–59), (Yazawin Thit Vol. 1 2012: 267–269), and (Hmannan Vol. 2 2003: 55–57).)

=== Adjustment of strength figures ===
The military strength figures in this article have been reduced by an order of magnitude from those reported in the chronicles, following G.E. Harvey's and Victor Lieberman's analyses of Burmese chronicles' military strength figures in general. (Note: See (Harvey 1925: 333–335)'s "Numerical Note". (Lieberman 2014: 98) writing on the First Toungoo period concurs: "Military mobilizations were probably more of a boast than a realistic estimate. Modern industrial states have difficulty placing 10% of their people under arms.")

== Hanthawaddy war of succession (1422) ==
=== Battle of Dala ===
==== Dagon–Ava ====
Dagon–Ava Order of Battle, early 1422
Unit	Commander	Strength (Note: Unless otherwise stated, the military mobilization figures in this article are reduced by an order of magnitude from those reported in the royal chronicles, per G.E. Harvey's analysis in his History of Burma (1925) in the section Numerical Note (pp. 333–335).)	Reference(s)
Combined Strike Force	Prince Binnya Kyan	2000+ troops, 20 war boats	(Note: Chronicles report: Maha Yazawin and Hmannan: 10,000 troops, 200 war boats; Yazawin Thit: 20,000 troops, 200 war boats)
Dagon Regiment	Binnya Kyan	?	(Note: Chronicles report: Maha Yazawin and Hmannan: 10,000 troops, 200 war boats; Yazawin Thit: 20,000 troops, 200 war boats)
1st Ava Regiment	Zeyathingyan †	2000 troops, 20 war boats	(Note: Chronicles report: Maha Yazawin and Hmannan: 10,000 troops, 200 war boats; Yazawin Thit: 20,000 troops, 200 war boats)
2nd Ava Regiment	Tuyin Ponnya	2000 troops, 20 war boats	(Note: Chronicles report: Maha Yazawin and Hmannan: 10,000 troops, 200 war boats; Yazawin Thit: 20,000 troops, 200 war boats)

==== Hanthawaddy Pegu ====
Pegu Order of Battle, early 1422
Unit	Commander	Strength	Reference(s)
Dala Corps	Smin Maw-Khwin (executed); Smin Pun-Si (executed)	2 regiments	

== Ava invasion (1422–1423) ==
=== Battles of Irrawaddy delta and Dagon ===
==== Ava ====
Ava Order of Battle, 1422–1423
Unit	Commander	Strength	Reference(s)
1st Army	Thado of Mohnyin	8 regiments (8000 troops, 500 cavalry, 30 elephants)	(Note: Maha Yazawin, Yazawin Thit and Hmannan: 8 regiments (80,000 troops, 5000 cavalry, 300 elephants))
Prome Regiment	Min Maha of Prome		(Note: Maha Yazawin, Yazawin Thit and Hmannan: 8 regiments (80,000 troops, 5000 cavalry, 300 elephants))
Taungdwin Regiment	Thihapate III of Taungdwin		(Note: Maha Yazawin, Yazawin Thit and Hmannan: 8 regiments (80,000 troops, 5000 cavalry, 300 elephants))
? Regiment	Sithu		(Note: Maha Yazawin, Yazawin Thit and Hmannan: 8 regiments (80,000 troops, 5000 cavalry, 300 elephants))
Salin Regiment	Nawrahta of Salin		(Note: Maha Yazawin, Yazawin Thit and Hmannan: 8 regiments (80,000 troops, 5000 cavalry, 300 elephants))
Nyaungyan Regiment	Baya Kyawhtin of Nyaungyan		(Note: Maha Yazawin, Yazawin Thit and Hmannan: 8 regiments (80,000 troops, 5000 cavalry, 300 elephants))
Pinle Regiment	Thray Thinkhaya of Pinle		(Note: Maha Yazawin, Yazawin Thit and Hmannan: 8 regiments (80,000 troops, 5000 cavalry, 300 elephants))
Sagaing Regiment	Yazathingyan of Sagaing		(Note: Maha Yazawin, Yazawin Thit and Hmannan: 8 regiments (80,000 troops, 5000 cavalry, 300 elephants))
Mohnyin Regiment	Thado of Mohnyin		(Note: Maha Yazawin, Yazawin Thit and Hmannan: 8 regiments (80,000 troops, 5000 cavalry, 300 elephants))
Navy	Min Nyo of Kale	5 (or 6) regiments (6000 troops, 50 war boats, 20 (or 50) ironclad transport boats, 20 (or 50) cargo boats)	(Note: Invasion naval force: Yazawin Thit: 6 regiments (60,000 troops, 500 war boats, 200 ironclad hlawga transport boats, 200 cargo boats); the sixth regiment was commanded by King Thihathu himself.; Maha Yazawin and Hmannan: 5 regiments (60,000 troops, 500 war boats, 200 ironclad hlawga transport boats, 200 cargo boats) After the terms of the peace treaty were already agreed upon, Thihathu came down with a naval force consisted of 5 regiments (70,000 troops, 500 war boats, 200 ironclad hlawga transport boats, 300 cargo boats). Thus the total naval force would be (130,000 troops, 1000 war boats, 400 ironclad transport boats, and 500 cargo boats).)
? Regiment	Thray Nanthu		
Singu Regiment	Baya Gamani of Singu		
? Regiment	Baya Thingyan		
Pagan Regiment	Tarabya of Pagan		
Kale Regiment	Min Nyo of Kale		

==== Hanthawaddy Western Division ====
Pegu Order of Battle, 1422–1423
Unit	Commander	Strength	Reference(s)
Western Division	Prince Binnya Ran		
Khebaung Regiment			
Bassein Regiment			
Dala Regiment			
Dagon Regiment	Prince Binnya Ran		

== Bibliography ==
- Harvey, G. E. (1925). History of Burma: From the Earliest Times to 10 March 1824. London: Frank Cass & Co. Ltd.
- Kala, U (2006) [1724]. Maha Yazawin (in Burmese). Vol. 1–3 (4th printing ed.). Yangon: Ya-Pyei Publishing.
- Lieberman, Victor B. (2014) [1984]. Burmese Administrative Cycles: Anarchy and Conquest, c. 1580–1760. Princeton University Press. ISBN 978-0-691-05407-0.
- Maha Sithu (2012) [1798]. Myint Swe; Kyaw Win; Thein Hlaing (eds.). Yazawin Thit (in Burmese). Vol. 1–3 (2nd printing ed.). Yangon: Ya-Pyei Publishing.
- Royal Historical Commission of Burma (2003) [1832]. Hmannan Yazawin (in Burmese). Vol. 1–3. Yangon: Ministry of Information, Myanmar.
