= Ava–Hanthawaddy War (1422–1423) =

Military conflict in present-day Myanmar (1422–1423)

- Part of the Forty Years' War
Date	c. February 1422 – c. January 1423
Location	Southern Myanmar
Result	Treaty of Dagon: Alliance between Thihathu and Binnya Ran; Marriage of state between Thihathu and Shin Saw Pu; Ran renounces his claim over Tharrawaddy
Territorial changes	Status quo ante bellum

Belligerents
Ava	Hanthawaddy Pegu

Commanders and leaders
Thihathu; Binnya Kyan Dala (Note: to c. March 1422); Thado; Min Nyo; Nawrahta; Min Maha; Thihapate; Yazathingyan; Baya Gamani; Tarabya; Thray Thinkhaya; Baya Kyawhtin; Zeyathingyan (executed); Tuyin Ponnya	Binnya Dhammaraza (Note: nominal king); Binnya Ran Bassein (Note: in revolt since mid 1422); Binnya Kyan Dala (Note: from c. March 1422); Smin Maw-Khwin III (executed); Smin Pun-Si (executed)

Strength
1422 (Note: Unless otherwise stated, the military mobilization figures in this article are reduced by an order of magnitude from those reported in the royal chronicles, per G.E. Harvey's analysis in his History of Burma (1925) in the section Numerical Note (pp. 333–335).): Ava Strike Force: 2 regiments (2,000 troops, 20 war boats); Kyan's regiment; 1422–1423: Army: 8 regiments (8,000 troops, 500 cavalry, 30 elephants); Navy: 6 regiments (6,000 troops, 50 war boats)	1422: Dala Corps: 2 regiments; 1422–1423: Ran's army: 4+ regiments

Casualties and losses
Total unknown	Total unknown
- See Ava–Hanthawaddy War (1422–1423) orders of battle for more information.

The Ava–Hanthawaddy War (1422–1423) (Burmese: အင်းဝ–ဟံသာဝတီ စစ် (၁၄၂၂–၁၄၂၃)) was the fourth major conflict of the Forty Years' War, fought between Ava and Hanthawaddy Pegu in present-day Myanmar. The war was precipitated by a succession crisis in Pegu, following the death of King Razadarit in 1421. King Thihathu of Ava initially intervened on behalf of Prince Binnya Kyan but later ended his involvement by forming an alliance with Crown Prince Binnya Ran.

The conflict began in early 1422 when Ava forces helped Kyan retake his fief of Dala. However, due to rampant looting by the Ava troops, Kyan quickly switched allegiance back to his brother, King Binnya Dhammaraza, and drove his former allies out. The Hanthawaddy power struggle soon resumed when Crown Prince Ran seized control of Dagon, and claimed Ava's southernmost district of Tharrawaddy. Thihathu responded by launching a larger, retaliatory invasion of the Irrawaddy Delta in November 1422. When Ava forces laid siege to Ran's "capital" of Dagon, Ran sued for peace, offering an alliance and a marriage of state to his sister, Princess Shin Saw Pu. Thihathu, primarily interested in restoring royal prestige and securing his border, accepted the terms and withdrew his forces in early 1423.

The peace was short-lived. Hanthawaddy was reunified under Ran's leadership by 1424, while Ava was plunged into a prolonged succession crisis following Thihathu's assassination in 1425. Ran exploited Ava's internal chaos by allying with the rebel vassal Toungoo and seizing Ava's southern districts of Tharrawaddy and Paungde by 1427. The allies subsequently pushed farther north by attacking Prome, starting the Ava–Hanthawaddy War (1430–1431).

== Background ==
This was the fourth war between Ava and Hanthawaddy Pegu since 1385, occurring shortly after the conclusion of third war (1408–1418). In that decade-long war, Hanthawaddy, Ming China and its vassals (Maw (Mong Mao) and Hsenwi) jointly attacked Ava in response to Ava's expansion into Launggyet Arakan and the Shan states. The war ended without a formal peace treaty between Ava and either Hanthawaddy or China. (Note: According to the Hsenwi Yazawin, Ava and Hsenwi (then a Chinese vassal) signed a peace treaty in 780 ME (1418/19).)

The unofficial peace held for the next three years until the deaths of both Minkhaung I and Razadarit in late 1421. At Ava (Inwa), Crown Prince Thihathu succeeded without incident. However, the succession at Pegu (Bago) was not orderly, plunging the kingdom into a succession crisis.

The crisis signaled the likelihood of external interference, a pattern established in previous conflicts. In the first war (1385–1391), King Swa Saw Ke of Ava unsuccessfully tried to replace the new king Razadarit of Hanthawaddy. Likewise, Razadarit unsuccessfully attempted to gain submission of Ava's new king Minkhaung in the second war (1401–1403).

Past interferences were rooted in strategic and economic reasons. Ava sought to restore the erstwhile Pagan Empire, and fought to maintain control of its southernmost towns down to Tharrawaddy (Thayawadi) in order to control the "trade along the Irrawaddy as far south as possible". Conversely, Pegu attempted to establish a larger strategic depth, by trying to seize Ava's southernmost districts of Tharrawaddy, Gu-Htut as well as Prome and Toungoo farther north in the previous wars. (Note: Hanthawaddy's attempts to extend control farther north included: Occupation of Gu-Htut and Ahlwe in 1390–1391; Occupation of Tharrawaddy, Gu-Htut and Ahlwe, and sieges of Prome in 1401–1403, 1412–1413; Attack on Toungoo in 1416)

== Prelude to war ==
=== Pegu succession crisis ===
The crisis began immediately after Razadarit's burial. Because the late king had not appointed an heir-apparent, his three remaining sons— Prince Binnya Dhammaraza, Prince Binnya Ran and Prince Binnya Kyan—vied for the throne. (Note: The fourth son, Prince Binnya Set, had been taken away to Ava since 1418.) The chief rivals were the two eldest sons, Dhammaraza and Ran, who were born only a few months apart by different queens. Chief Minister Dein Mani-Yut did not take sides between Dhammaraza and Ran. However, Dhammaraza, who had claimed the throne by primogeniture, apparently garnered enough support at court to be crowned king at Pegu (Bago).

A chaotic rebellion and shifting alliances ensued. Ran and Kyan immediately revolted out of their fiefs, Syriam (Thanlyin) and Dala (Dala–Twante), respectively. Initially, Ran and Kyan formed an alliance but no one trusted the other. Kyan went on to seize Dagon (modern downtown Yangon) across the river from Syriam. This brazen land grab convinced Ran to accept Dhammaraza's offer to become the heir apparent. Kyan was now isolated. Dhammaraza then successfully sent an army to take Dala. Holed up in Dagon, a desperate Kyan sent a letter to Thihathu, pledging his allegiance in exchange for military help "to recover his rightful fief, Dala."

=== Thihathu's decision ===
Kyan's request represented the first foreign policy decision for Thihathu. According to the chronicles, the new king had done little governing. He reportedly spent much of his time with his new queen Shin Bo-Me, who happened to be his father's favorite queen. To be sure, the king, who served as governor of Prome (Pyay) from 1413 to 1416, had kept a close eye on the southern border. He had just appointed new governors in Prome and Tharrawaddy. (Note: Thihathu transferred (demoted) Governor Saw Shwe Khet of Prome to the border district of Tharrawaddy (Thayawadi), and appointed Min Maha as the new governor of Prome.) According to chronicle reporting, Thihathu did not entertain the idea of a regime change as his grandfather, father, and eldest brother had before him. In the end, the king opted for limited involvement to keep Kyan's rebellion afloat. He sent down two regiments (2000 troops, 20 war boats) via the Irrawaddy river, led by commanders Zeyathingyan and Tuyin Ponnya. (Note: Inconsistency in commanders' names: The Maha Yazawin (1724) is inconsistent. It first names Yazathingyan and Tuyin Ponnya as the commanders of the Dala campaign, stating Yazathingyan was killed. Just a page later, it lists Yazathingyan as a commander in the 1422–1423 dry season campaign.; The Yazawin Thit (1798) corrects this, naming Zeyathingyan and Tuyin Ponnya as the commanders of the Dala campaign and noting that Yazathingyan lived at least to the reign of King Narapati I of Ava (r. 1442–1468).; The Hmannan (1832) retains the Maha Yazawin's inconsistent narrative.)

== Dala campaign (c. February–March 1422) ==
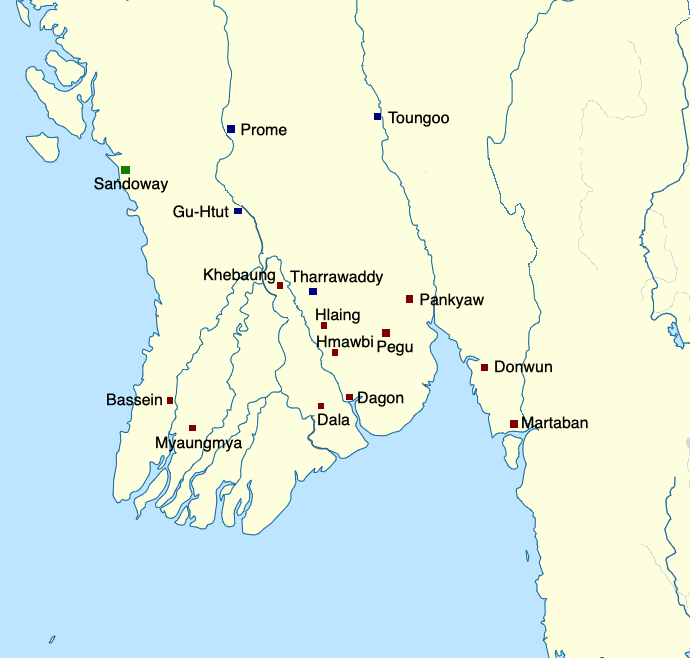
Ava forces helped Binnya Kyan retake Dala, before being driven back.

Circa February 1422, (Note: Chronicles do not agree on the start of the Dala campaign: The Maha Yazawin (1724) gives [late] 784 ME (early 1423).; The Yazawin Thit gives [late] 783 ME (early 1422).; The Hmannan (1832) sides with the Yazawin Thit's [late] 783 ME (early 1422).) the small Ava flotilla crossed the border into the Irrawaddy delta. Their battle plan relied on the intelligence that customary Hanthawaddy defenses had not been organized. The flotilla advanced unimpeded down the Hlaing River towards Dagon. Despite their relatively small size, they successfully lifted the siege at Dagon.

At Dagon, Kyan targeted to regain his fief. The combined Ava and Kyan's regiments launched a joint attack on Dala by land and river. Dala's defenses, led by Smin Maw-Khwin and Smin Pun-Si, resisted but ultimately fell. Following the victory, Binnya Kyan was so angered by the commanders' fierce resistance that he had both of them executed.

However, the alliance soon fractured. The reason was the blatant looting and deportation of townsfolk by the Ava troops. Disgusted with his allies, Kyan quickly entered into secret talks with Dhammaraza, and the brothers soon reached an agreement. In exchange for Kyan's allegiance, Dhammaraza agreed to restore Kyan to his post at Dala, with the promise of a substantial future fief.

A joint operation by the brothers ensued. Dhammaraza sent another army to Dala. Meanwhile, Kyan treacherously engineered the murder of principal Ava officers inside Dala, including Commander Zeyathingyan. The remaining Ava forces, led by Tuyin Ponnya, were forced to withdraw in disarray. In the end, only about half the Ava troops managed to return to their base at Prome.

== Interlude (c. April–October 1422) ==
=== Ava response ===
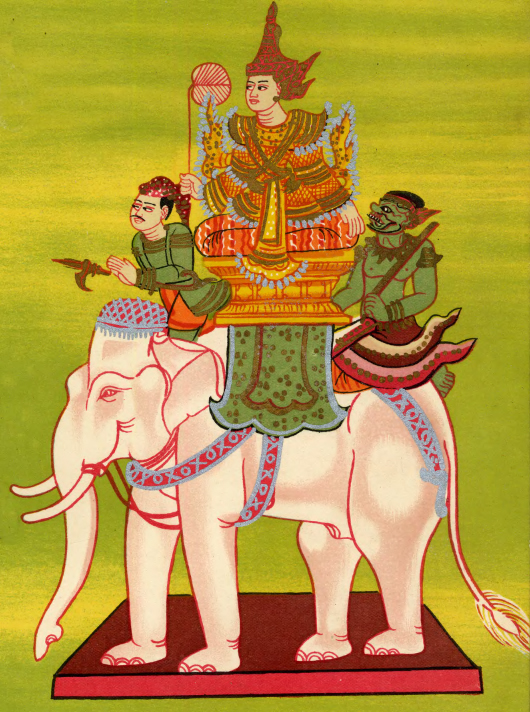
Thihathu portrayed as the Aung Pinle Hsinbyushin nat.

At Ava, Thihathu was oblivious. Despite his rash decision to intervene in Pegu's affairs, the king had not closely followed the events. According to the chronicles, he continued spending so much of his time with Queen Bo-Me that his chief queen consort, Saw Min Hla, moved out of the palace. The disaster at Dala now forced him to respond; royal prestige was at stake. He ordered a mobilization for a sizable retaliatory campaign for the upcoming dry season.

=== Machinations in Hanthawaddy ===
Meanwhile, at Pegu, the three brothers reached a power-sharing agreement. King Dhammaraza granted Bassein–Myaungmya Province (modern Ayeyarwady Region) in the west to Crown Prince Ran, and Martaban Province (modern Mon State and southern Kayin State) in the east to Prince Kyan. The king retained direct control only over central Pegu Province (modern Yangon Region and southern Bago Region).

The arrangement soon broke down. While Kyan was satisfied, Ran was not. As soon as Kyan left for Martaban, Ran brazenly occupied Dagon, the territory belonging to Pegu. However, Dhammaraza did not respond to Ran's "ungrateful conduct" because he was hampered by various court factions.

=== Tharrawaddy question ===
Ran's land grab may have also breached Ava's territory. According to the Slapat Rajawan chronicle, Ran also took over Tharrawaddy, which belonged to Ava at the time. However, the main chronicles, which narrate primarily from the perspective, do not mention Ran's occupation of Tharrawaddy at all. The omission is significant because the territory would have been listed as part of Ava's casus belli. (Note: See the war narratives in (Maha Yazawin Vol. 2 2006: 57–59), (Yazawin Thit Vol. 1 2012: 267–269), (Hmannan Vol. 2 2003: 55–57).) Historians Arthur Purves Phayre and Michael Aung-Thwin, following the Slapat, conjectured that Ran controlled Tharrawaddy.

At any rate, on the eve of Ava's dry season invasion, Ran controlled the most territory: the entire Irrawaddy delta as well as the southern Pegu province, and perhaps Tharrawaddy. King Dhammaraza, meanwhile, controlled only the area immediately surrounding the capital.

== Ava invasion of Hanthawaddy (November 1422–January 1423) ==
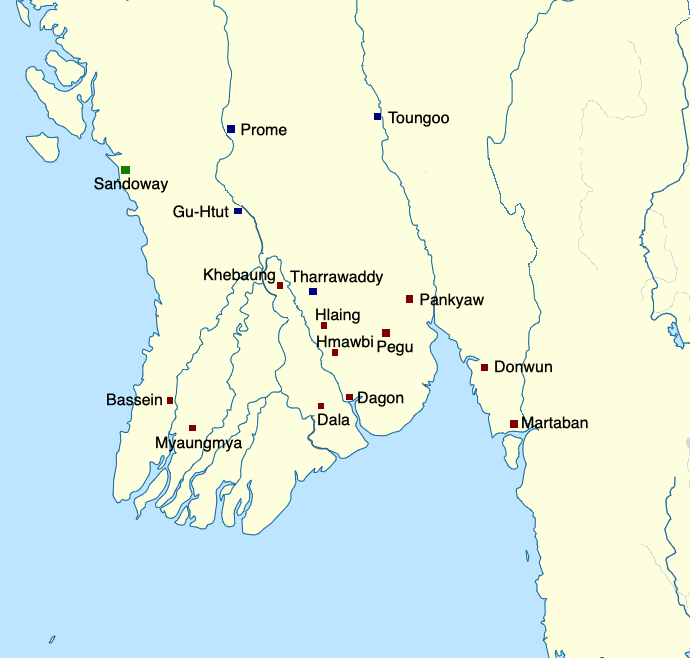
Ava forces saw battle at Khebaung, Bassein, Dala before laying siege to Dagon.

=== Preparations ===
The Ava battle plan was similar to the previous retaliatory campaign of 1417–1418. As in that campaign, they opted to open only the Irrawaddy Delta front, bypassing the Sittaung front towards Pegu. The Ava command had assembled a joint land and naval strike force, like the previous campaign. The force consisted of an army (8000 troops, 500 cavalry, 30 elephants) commanded by Governor Thado of Mohnyin, and a navy (6000 troops, 50 war boats, 50 ironclad hlawga transport boats, 50 cargo boats), (Note: Army: Maha Yazawin, Yazawin Thit and Hmannan: 8 regiments (80,000 troops, 5000 cavalry, 300 elephants); Navy: Yazawin Thit: 6 regiments (60,000 troops, 500 war boats, 500 ironclad hlawga transport boats, 500 cargo boats); Maha Yazawin, Hmannan: 5 regiments (60,000 troops, 500 war boats, 200 ironclad hlawga transport boats, 200 cargo boats)) commanded by Prince Min Nyo of Kale. The total strength of the strike force was 14,000 troops, slightly smaller than the 16,000 troops fielded in the 1417–1418 campaign.

On the Hanthawaddy side, no unified, coordinated defense existed. Since power was split among the three rivals, Ran was left to defend the delta on his own while Dhammaraza concentrated on the Sittaung front. (Kyan's Martaban province did not share a border with Ava.) Given his limited manpower on the delta front, Ran's battle plan was to resist from inside the key fortified towns across the delta (and perhaps Tharrawaddy). He kept most of his manpower in his "capital" of Dagon.

=== Invasion ===
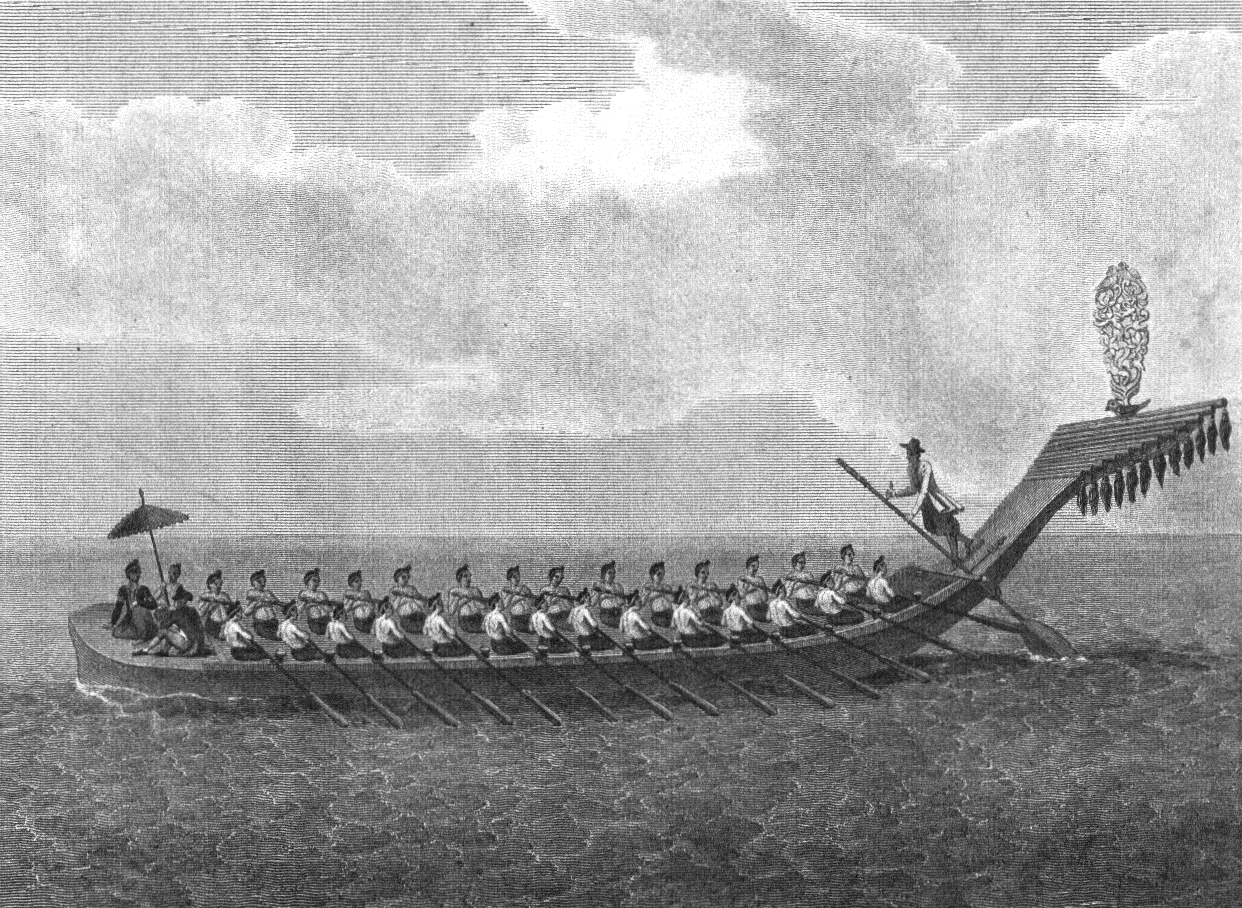
An 18th-century painting of a Burmese war boat on the Irrawaddy River

The invasion began in c. late November 1422. (Note: November 1422 per the Yazawin Thit: The Maha Yazawin (1724) says the invasion began in Nadaw 785 ME (3 November 1423–1 December 1423); The Yazawin Thit (1798) corrects the Maha Yazawin, and gives Nadaw 784 ME (14 November 1422–12 December 1422), citing the frescoes at the Shwe Kyaung Monastery in Pagan (Bagan), which states that the main delta campaign took place entirely in 784 ME.; The Hmannan (1832) accepts the Yazawin Thit's correction of Nadaw 784 ME.) The invaders first attacked the Khebaung fort, which served as the gateway into the delta. The small garrison resisted but the fort fell soon after. An Ava regiment was assigned to guard the strategically located fort. (Note: According to the frescoes at the Shwe Kyaung Monastery in Pagan (Bagan), the Ava commander at Fort Khebaung is referred to as "ဘုရား တကာ" (paya daga, "the donor/benefactor of the religion"—i.e. the sponsor of the frescoes). The donor may have been Tarabya, the then governor of Pagan, who participated in the 1422–1423 campaign. To be sure, other commanders could have funded the frescoes.) Ava forces then marched to the western delta, and captured Bassein with minimal resistance. Nawrahta of Salin was appointed the military governor to hold the western delta. Ava forces next marched to the eastern delta. Ran's forces defended Dala briefly before retreating to Dagon. Ava forces converged on Dagon, from Hlaing (modern Taikkyi) in the north and from Dala in the west.

However, the siege made no further progress. Dagon was heavily fortified, well provisioned, and had sufficient troops. Ava forces now prepared for a long siege as they had in the previous campaigns.

=== Peace proposal ===
About one month into the siege, c. January 1423, Ran made a peace offer. He sought an alliance with King Thihathu, and was prepared to offer his younger sister Princess Shin Saw Pu in a marriage of state. The Ava army commander-in-chief, Thado of Mohnyin, relayed Ran's letter to Thihathu.

At Ava, the proposal was well received. For Thihathu, the expedition had achieved its objective: to restore his royal prestige. Unlike his late fiery brother Minye Kyawswa, he had no desire to conquer the southern kingdom. He apparently did not extract any territorial or economic concessions as his father did in 1403. (Note: After the end of the second war in 1403, Pegu agreed to grant Ava the customs revenue of the port of Bassein, and 30 war elephants—annually.) Chronicles state that Thihathu, while handsome and good-natured, was mainly interested in womanizing rather than statecraft. According to Htin Aung, Thihathu did not want a prolonged conflict in the south, given the impending Maw (Mong Mao) threat in the north. In any case, the king accepted the offer, and sailed down the Irrawaddy with a flotilla to Dagon.

=== Treaty of Dagon ===
Circa late January 1423, (Note: The treaty must have been signed before the 12th waxing of Tabaung 784 ME (21 February 1423). The reason is that Shin Saw Pu was still in her 29th year (aged 28) at the time of her marriage to Thihathu. The queen was born on Wednesday, 12th waxing of Tabaung 755 ME (Wednesday, 11 February 1394).) King Thihathu and Crown Prince Binnya Ran met outside Dagon, and signed the peace treaty. Chronicles do not provide the specific terms of the treaty except that the two sides agreed to an alliance, and a marriage of state between Thihathu and Shin Saw Pu. The marriage ceremony between Thihathu and Shin Saw Pu followed. The 28-year-old princess, a widowed mother of two, was consecrated queen.

Furthermore, Ran apparently renounced his claim over Tharrawaddy. Indeed, all three main chronicles make it a point to note that Thihathu inspected the Tharrawaddy border as he returned home. (Note: Thihathu and his top advisers went on an elephant hunting trip along the Tharrawaddy border. It was then that Governor Smin Bayan of Legaing, a former Hanthawaddy commander on the Ava side, famously made a break for the border to return to his homeland.)

== Aftermath ==
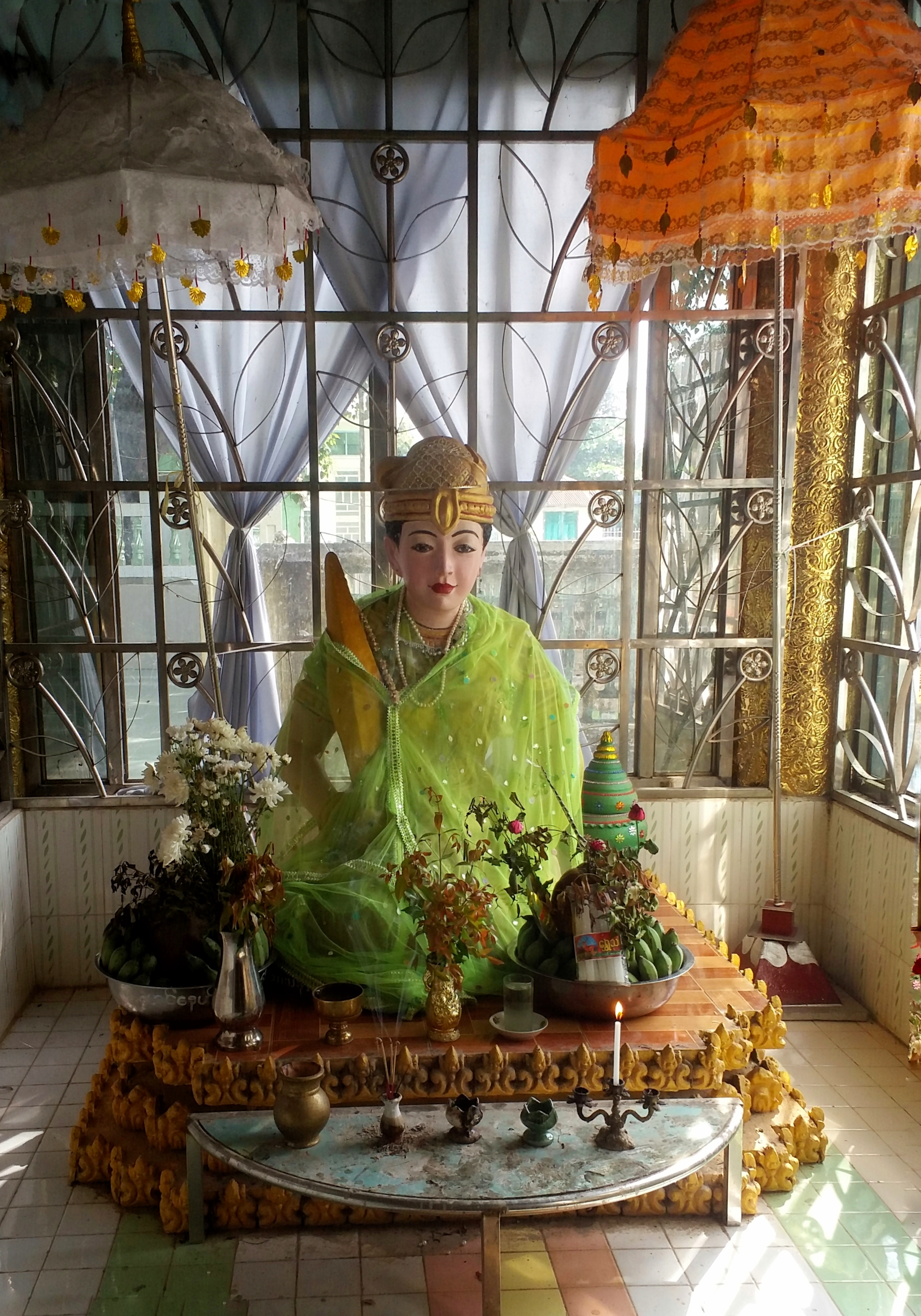
A representation of Queen Shin Saw Pu

The two kingdoms followed separate trajectories over the next four years. After the war, Hanthawaddy entered "a long period of peace." In contrast, Ava, following Thihathu's assassination in 1425, spiraled into a prolonged period of civil war.

Following the war, Ran emerged as the strongest ruler in the fragmented south. Dhammaraza held on to power at Pegu until his sudden death in late 1424 (after being poisoned by one of his queens). Ran immediately seized the Hanthawaddy throne, and granted his brother Kyan considerable autonomy at Martaban in exchange for sharing the region's lucrative commercial revenues with the crown.

Meanwhile, palace intrigues intensified under Thihathu's rule. His favoritism towards Queen Shin Saw Pu provoked the jealous rage of his previous favorite, Queen Shin Bo-Me. She subsequently engineered the assassinations of Thihathu in August 1425, and his successor, eight-year-old Min Hla, in November 1425. Bo-Me then placed her lover Prince Min Nyo of Kale on the throne, making herself the chief queen consort. Many vassals considered this accession illegitimate. In February 1426, a civil war broke out between Gov. Thado of Mohnyin and King Nyo. Even after Thado's victory in May 1426, several vassals remained in revolt for the next several years.

Ran skillfully exploited the chaos in Ava. He readily formed an alliance with the rebel governor, Thinkhaya III of Toungoo, and seized Ava's southernmost districts, from Tharrawaddy to Paungde in 1427. The new king of Ava, Thado, was unable to respond as he faced multiple rebellions across the country. After Shin Saw Pu fled Ava, and returned to Pegu in 1429, Ran planned to push farther north. In 1430, Hanthawaddy and Toungoo jointly attacked Prome, starting the Ava–Hanthawaddy War (1430–1431).

== Historiography ==
The war is covered primarily in the main royal chronicles. The chronicle Maha Yazawin (1724) is the first to cover the war from Ava's perspective. (Note: See (Aung-Thwin 2017): "U Kala's perspective, from Upper Myanmar...", and (Fernquest Spring 2006): "the Burmese chronicle, which adds detail from Ava's Upper Burma perspective". U Kala's Mahayazawingyi, one of the first and most complete versions of the Burmese historical chronicle, will be used here (U Kala, 1961).") The Yazawin Thit chronicle (1798) corrects the Maha Yazawin's dates of the war. It also adds the details of the battles of Khebaung, Bassein and Dala, based on the contemporary frescoes found at the Shwe Kyaung Monastery ("Golden Monastery") in Pagan (Bagan). The Hmannan Yazawin (1832) follows the Yazawin Thit's narrative.

The Razadarit Ayedawbon chronicle (c. 1560), which covers the prior Ava–Hanthawaddy wars from the Hanthawaddy perspective, (Note: See (Aung-Thwin 2017: 250–253) and (Fernquest Spring 2006: 3–9) for the authors' use of the Razadarit Ayedawbon to provide coverage from Pegu's perspective.) provides little to no coverage of the war. (Note: Regarding the warfare after the deaths of Minkhaung and Razadarit, San Lwin's translation (Fernquest Spring 2006: 20) only says "their successors carried on the war for a few years" while Pan Hla's edition of the chronicle (Pan Hla 2005: 362–365) does not mention any fighting at all during Thihathu's and Dhammaraza's reigns.) The Slapat Rajawan chronicle (1766), in the 1873 version edited by Arthur Purves Phayre, provides a cursory coverage of the war. (Note: The Slapat has at least two versions: A.P. Phayre's version, which includes his "corrections" per (Phayre 1873: 200), covers the war (Phayre 1873: 120). (Aung-Thwin 2017: 261–262)'s coverage of the war cites Phayre's version.; P.W. Schmidt's German translation of the chronicle does not include any coverage of a war during "Dhammaraga's" (Dhammaraza's) reign (Schmidt 1906: 119–121).)

Event	Maha Yazawin; (1724)	Yazawin Thit; (1798)	Hmannan Yazawin; (1832)	Slapat Rajawan (1766); as edited by Phayre (1873)
Dala campaign begins	c. February 1423	c. February 1422	c. February 1422	1422 (Note: 784 ME (30 March 1422–29 March 1423), which Phayre abbreviated as "1422".)
Binnya Ran's claim on (or occupation of) Tharrawaddy	not mentioned	not mentioned	not mentioned	1422
Irrawaddy delta invasion begins	c. mid November 1423 (Note: Nadaw 785 ME = 3 November 1423–1 December 1423)	c. late November 1422 (Note: Nadaw 784 ME = 14 November 1422–12 December 1422)	c. late November 1422	1422
Battle of Khebaung; Battle of Bassein; Battle of Dala	battles not mentioned	[November–December 1422, implied]	[November–December 1422, implied]	battles not mentioned
Siege of Dagon up to the peace proposal	about one month; [November–December 1423, implied]	about one month; [December 1422–January 1423, implied]	about one month; [December 1422–January 1423, implied]	not mentioned

== Bibliography ==
- Athwa, Sayadaw (1906) [1766]. "Slapat des Ragawan der Königsgeschichte". Die äthiopischen Handschriften der K.K. Hofbibliothek zu Wien (in German). 151. Translated by P.W. Schmidt. Vienna: Alfred Hölder.
- Aung-Thwin, Michael A. (2017). Myanmar in the Fifteenth Century. Honolulu: University of Hawai'i Press. ISBN 978-0-8248-6783-6.
- Fernquest, Jon (Spring 2006). "Rajadhirat's Mask of Command: Military Leadership in Burma (c. 1384–1421)" (PDF). SOAS Bulletin of Burma Research. 4 (1). Archived (PDF) from the original on 2020-03-22.
- Fernquest, Jon (Autumn 2006). "Crucible of War: Burma and the Ming in the Tai Frontier Zone (1382–1454)" (PDF). SOAS Bulletin of Burma Research. 4 (2). Archived (PDF) from the original on 2017-08-10.
- Harvey, G. E. (1925). History of Burma: From the Earliest Times to 10 March 1824. London: Frank Cass & Co. Ltd.
- Hlaing, Mi Mi (2018). "States of Hostilities in the First Ava Period". Mandalay University Research Journal. 9 (1). University of Mandalay.
- Htin Aung, Maung (1967). A History of Burma. New York and London: Cambridge University Press.
- Kala, U (2006) [1724]. Maha Yazawin (in Burmese). Vol. 1–3 (4th printing ed.). Yangon: Ya-Pyei Publishing.
- Maha Sithu (2012) [1798]. Myint Swe; Kyaw Win; Thein Hlaing (eds.). Yazawin Thit (in Burmese). Vol. 1–3 (2nd printing ed.). Yangon: Ya-Pyei Publishing.
- Pan Hla, Nai (2005) [1968]. Razadarit Ayedawbon (in Burmese) (8th printing ed.). Yangon: Armanthit Sarpay.
- Phayre, Major Gen. Sir Arthur P. (1873). "The History of Pegu". Journal of the Asiatic Society of Bengal. 42. Oxford University.
- Phayre, Lt. Gen. Sir Arthur P. (1967) [1883]. History of Burma. London: Susil Gupta.
- Royal Historical Commission of Burma (2003) [1832]. Hmannan Yazawin (in Burmese). Vol. 1–3. Yangon: Ministry of Information, Myanmar.
- Scott, James George; Hardiman, John Percy (1899). Gazetteer of Upper Burma and the Shan States. Vol. 1. Rangoon: Government Printing, Burma.
- Sein Lwin Lay, Kahtika U (2006) [1968]. Mintaya Shwe Hti and Bayinnaung: Ketumadi Taungoo Yazawin (in Burmese) (2nd printing ed.). Yangon: Yan Aung Sarpay.
- Shwe Naw, ed. (1922) [1785]. Mon Yazawin (Shwe Naw) (in Burmese). Translated by Shwe Naw. Yangon: Burma Publishing Workers Association Press.
