= Princess Htayanka =

Princess of Htayanka and Myoha (1873–1963)

Htayanka Hteik Kaung Tin
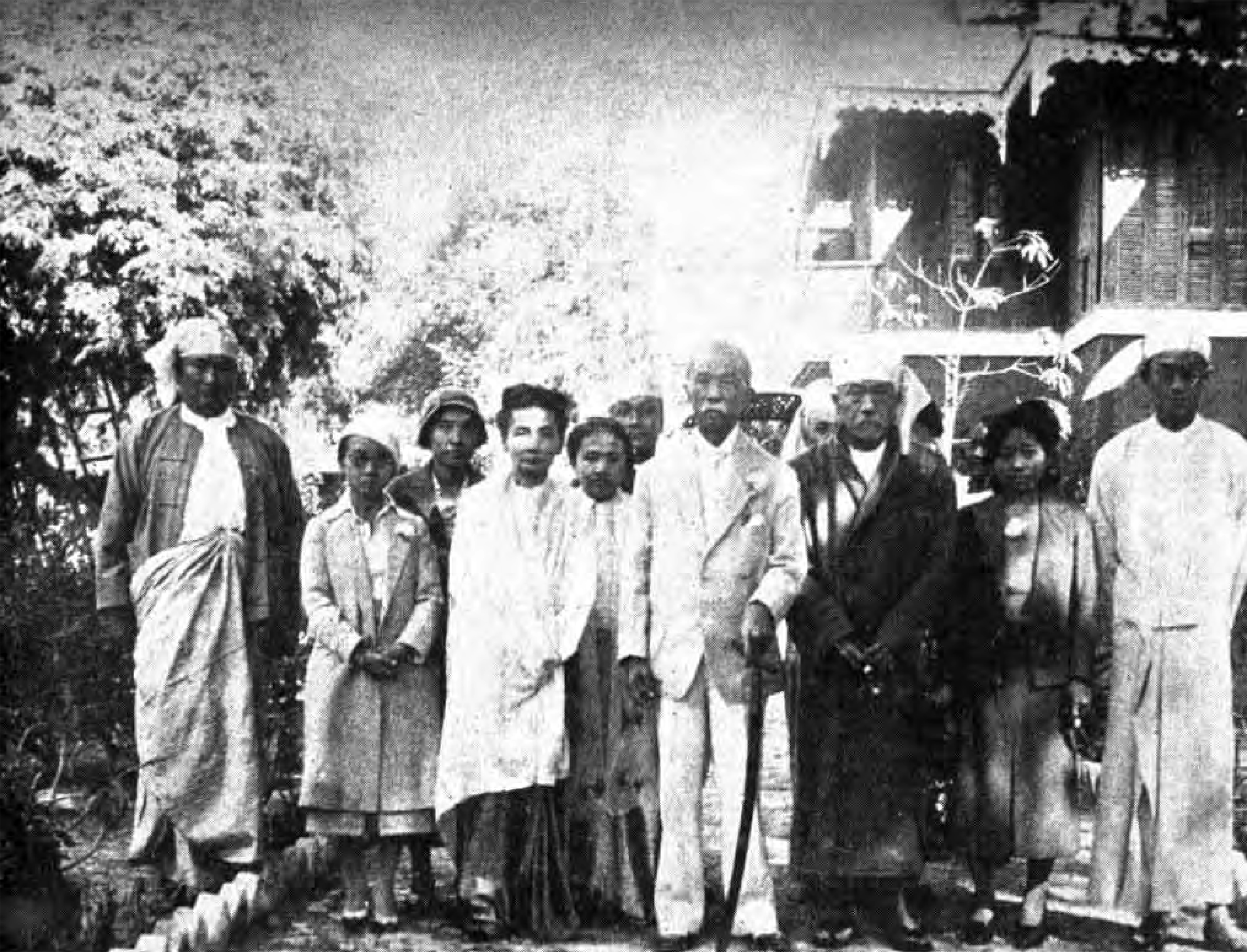
- The couple meet with Siam prince Damrong Rajanubhab at their residence in 1955

Princess of Htayanka and Myoha
- Reign: 1875 – 1885
- Successor: Title abolished
- Born: 1873; Mandalay
- Died: 1963 (aged 89–90); Rangoon, British Burma
- Burial: Kyaumyin Mibaya Tomb
- Husband: Pyinmana Prince
- House: Konbaung
- Father: Mindon Min
- Mother: Ngazun Mibaya

Htayanka Hteik Kaung Tin (Burmese: ထရံကာထိပ်ခေါင်တင်; 1873–1963), also known as Htanyanka Princess, was a Burmese royal princess. She married her half-brother Pyinmana Prince. During the Japanese occupation, the couple were considered a potential puppet king and queen by the Japanese government but refused the role.

== Life ==
Htayanka Hteik Kaung Tin was born in 1873 in Mandalay to King Mindon and his consort, Ngazun Mibaya, a queen of the fourth rank. The youngest of three siblings, her mother hailed from the Ayutthayan royal lineage, with her grandfather being a prince of the Ayutthaya Kingdom.

Htayanka was granted the appanage of Htayanka and Myohla as myoza, holding the rank of Hteikkaungtin, the second-rank Princess of Burma.

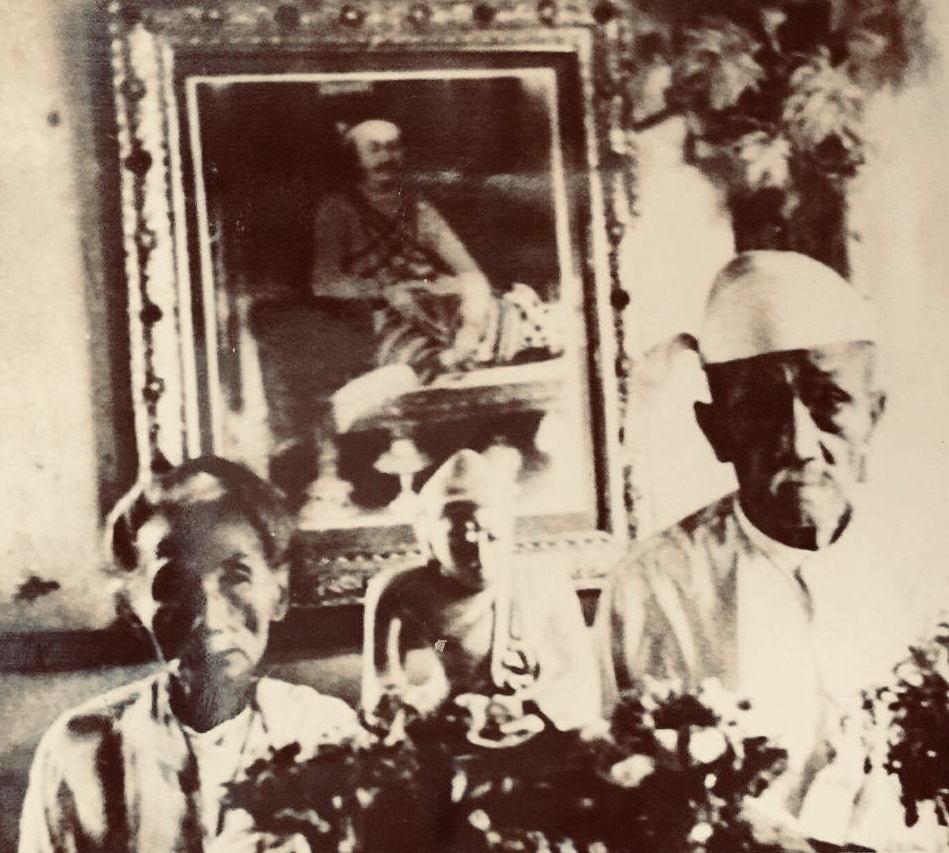
The prince and princess during their old age

During King Mindon's illness before his final days, she served as a masseuse to him. While observing her and Pyinmana, the right masseur, King Mindon was delighted and ordered their marriage once they reached adulthood. As they prepared to return, both Pyinmana and Htayanka were awarded a diamond necklace.

Upon reaching adulthood, she married Prince Pyinmana on March 25, 1902, during British rule. At the time, the princess was 28, and the prince was 30. He remained devoted to her, never taking another woman as a concubine.

After the fall of the Konbaung dynasty, they were sent to India by the British government, where Htayanka gave birth to their first son. Kyaymyin Mibaya, the mother of Pyinmana, later brought the child back to Burma, but unfortunately, he died at a young age.

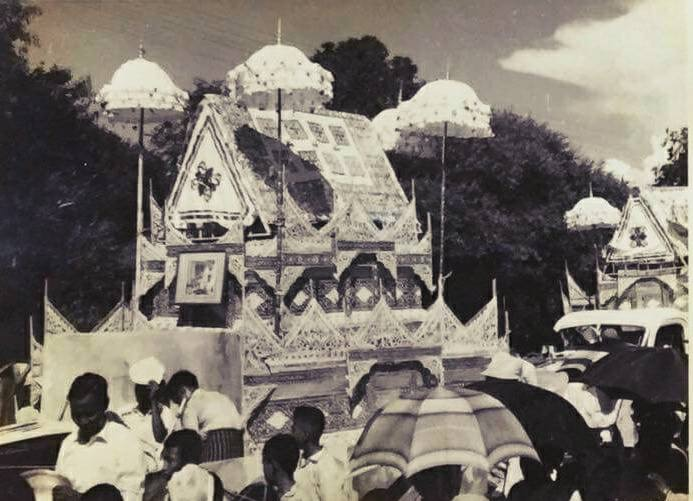
The funeral of Prince Pyinmana and Htayanka Princess in 1963

During the Japanese occupation of Burma, Pyinmana was considered a puppet heir to the throne by the Japanese government, but Pyinmana refused the offer in 1942.

Following a novitiation ceremony (shinbyu) for her grandchild, Princess Htayanka fell ill and died on June 2, 1963, at the age of 90. Her husband, overwhelmed with sorrow, died on June 7, four days after her death. They were laid to rest together in the courtyard of Kyaumyin Mibaya Tomb.

== See also ==
- Konbaung dynasty
- Mindon Min
