= Mohnyin Thado =

King of Ava (1426–1439), and founder of the Mohnyin dynasty of Ava

Mohnyin Thado မိုးညှင်း သတိုး

King of Ava
- Reign: 16 May 1426 – c. April 1439
- Coronation: 20 May 1426
- Predecessor: Kale Kye-Taung Nyo
- Successor: Minye Kyawswa I
- Chief Minister: Yazathingyan

Sawbwa of Mohnyin
- Reign: by 29 March 1410 – c. January 1427
- Predecessor: Vacant (since 1406)
- Successor: Son of the sawbwa of Mosit
- Monarch: Minkhaung I (1410–1421); Thihathu (1421–1425); Min Hla (1425); Min Nyo (1425–1426)
- Born: 23 October 1379; Sunday, 12th waxing of Tazaungmon 741 ME; Nyaungyan, Ava Kingdom
- Died: c. April 1439 (aged 59) c. waxing half of Nayon 801 ME; Ava (Inwa), Ava Kingdom
- Consort: Shin Myat Hla
- Issue among others...: Minye Kyawswa I of Ava; Narapati I of Ava
Names
- Thiri Tri-Bawana-Ditya-Pawara-Pandita Dhamma-Yaza (သီရိ တြိဘဝနာဒိတျပဝရပဏ္ဍိတ ဓမ္မရာဇာ)
- House: Mohnyin
- Father: Saw Diga of Mye-Ne
- Mother: Saw Pale of Nyaungyan
- Religion: Theravada Buddhism

Mohnyin Thado (Burmese: မိုးညှင်း သတိုး, pronounced [móɲ̥ɪ́ɴ ðədó]; Shan: မိူင်းယၢင်းထၢတ်ႈဢူး, Mongyang That Oo; 1379–1439) was king of Ava from 1426 to 1439. He is also known in Burmese history as Mohnyin Min Taya (မိုးညှင်း မင်းတရား, [móɲ̥ɪ́ɴ mɪ́ɴ təjá], "Righteous Lord of Mohnyin") after his longtime tenure as the sawbwa of Mohnyin, a Shan-speaking frontier state (in present-day Kachin State, Myanmar). He founded the royal house (or dynasty) of Mohnyin (မိုးညှင်း ဆက်) that would rule the kingdom until 1527.

Born into minor nobility, Thado began his career as a royal army commander in 1401 during the Forty Years' War against Hanthawaddy Pegu. After making his name under the command of Crown Prince Minye Kyawswa, including the 1406 conquest of Arakan, Thado was appointed sawbwa of Mohnyin in 1410 by King Minkhaung I. After surviving the Chinese incursions of 1412–1415, the sawbwa's influence in the northern Shan states grew over the next decade. He remained loyal to Minkhaung's successor King Thihathu, serving as a co-commander-in-chief alongside Prince Min Nyo of Kale in the successful final campaign of the Forty Years' War in 1422–1423. When Nyo seized the Ava throne with the help of Queen Shin Bo-Me in 1425, Thado was the only vassal to openly challenge the usurping couple; he drove them out of Ava (Inwa) in 1426.

However, Thado himself was viewed as a usurper by many vassals, and could not find any support outside the Irrawaddy valley. He faced a pesky rebellion by Prince Minye Kyawhtin of the previous dynasty from the outset, and by 1427, multiple rebellions had sprung up in the peripheral regions, including his home base, Mohnyin. By 1429, he had largely given up on the reunification project, and began spending much of the royal treasury on a series of constructions of religious buildings. He was unprepared when his internal and external rivals took advantage of his inward-looking policy. He lost the irrigated Yamethin region to the rebel state of Toungoo (Taungoo) in 1429–1430; was forced to cede Tharrawaddy and Paungde to King Binnya Ran I of Hanthawaddy in 1431 after a brief war; and did nothing when Ran seized control of Toungoo in 1436. He grew increasingly eccentric in his last years, and despite the advice of his court, reset the Burmese calendar to year 2 in 1438.

Although he never had any control over the peripheral regions, he did leave his successors with the most productive regions of the kingdom. His immediate successors—Minye Kyawswa I and Narapati I—would use the resources of the core regions to successfully reunify the kingdom in the following decade. His line would lead Ava to its "apogee" in the second half of the 15th century.

== Early life ==
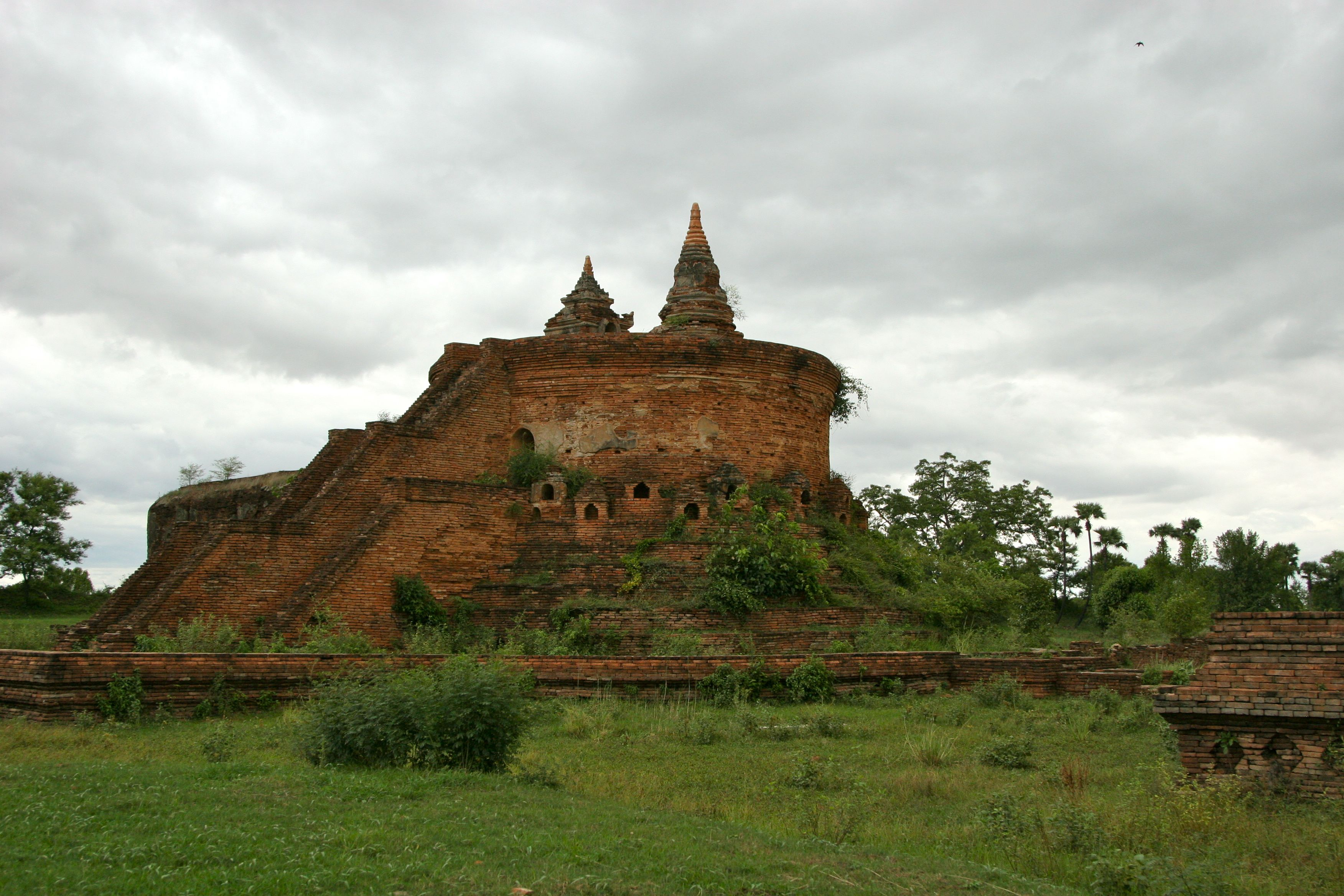
Ruins at present-day Inwa (Ava)

The future king was born Min Nansi (မင်း နံစီ) c. 23 October 1379 (Note: Per the Horoscopes section of the Zatadawbon Yazawin (Zata 1960: 75): Sunday, nine nekkhats in the 8th month in 741 ME—Sunday, 12th waxing of Tazaungmon 741 ME (23 October 1379).) in Nyaungyan, a small town 130 km (81 mi) south of Ava (Inwa), to a distant branch of the royal family. Both his parents—Saw Diga of Mye-Ne and Saw Pale of Nyaungyan—were descended from King Kyawswa I of Pinya (r. 1344–1350), and ultimately from the Pagan and Pinya royal lines, as did the then reigning monarch Swa Saw Ke of Ava. Nansi had two younger siblings, a brother and a sister.

His family apparently had close enough ties with King Swa. The king gave Nansi Inbe, a village 80km northwest of Ava, as an appanage along with the title of Udein (ဥဒိန်, Pali: Udinna). According to the chronicles Maha Yazawin and Hmannan Yazawin, when he was a young boy, Udein briefly served as a page of the king's younger sons, Min Swe and Theiddat, during the princes' years-long tour around the kingdom but left the job shortly after as he could not handle the life on the road. The Yazawin Thit chronicle dismisses the story, pointing out that he was still too young to have been a page during the period (1381–1385) when the princes toured the country.

Udein was nonetheless one of Min Swe's loyalists in 1400 when the prince ascended the throne with the regnal title of Minkhaung. The new king, who faced several challenges to his rule at the start of his reign, appointed Udein governor of Myohla (present-day Shwebo), near Inbe, with an upgraded title of Thado.

== Early career ==
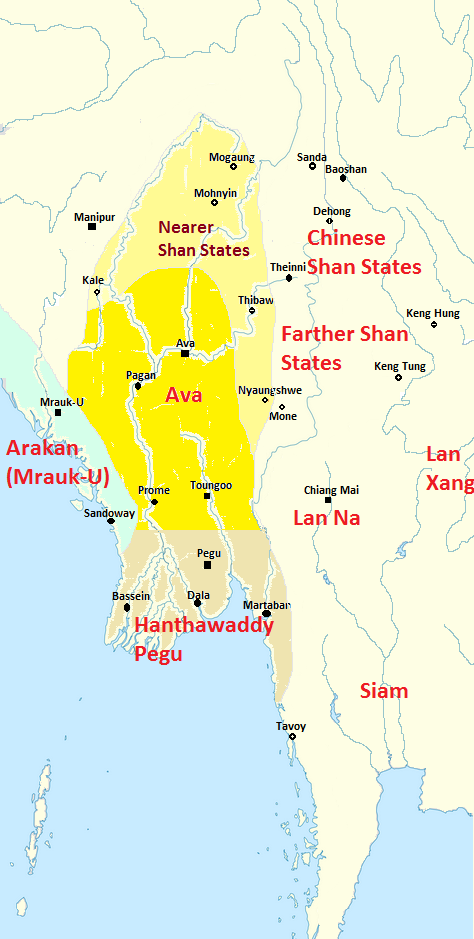
Political map of Myanmar c. 1450. The map in the first half of the century was similar except in Arakan which was disorganized until 1429. The nearer Shan states in light yellow, including Mohnyin, Mogaung, Thibaw (Hsipaw/Onbaung) and Nyaungshwe (Yawnghwe), were sometime tributaries of Ava during the first half of the 15th century.

Thado was one of the few loyal vassals the king could count on when King Razadarit of Hanthawaddy Pegu invaded Ava in 1401. He made his name as a royal army commander in 1402 by leading a successful mission to supply the besieged city of Prome (Pyay). His regiment guarding a convoy of 2000 pack ponies, each carrying two tins (~82 litres, ~2.25 bushels) of rice, successfully broke through the Hanthawaddy lines to supply the starving city, helping Prome hold out.

His career continued to rise in the following years. In 1406, he was the second-in-command (sitke) of the Ava invasion army (10,000 men, 500 cavalry, 40 elephants) led by Minkhaung's eldest son Prince Minye Kyawswa that captured the western kingdom of Arakan (present-day Rakhine State). In 1408, after Hanthawaddy had renewed the Forty Years' War, Thado was a member of the senior Ava delegation that tried unsuccessfully to negotiate a truce. (Note: (Pan Hla 2005: 254–255): The first and only meeting of the negotiation failed after the Hanthawaddy commander Lagun Ein replied honestly to a routine question by Thado if Pegu was negotiating in good faith. Lagun Ein reportedly replied: "Fool, this is war. You'll kill me if you can. I'll kill you if I can. How can you trust anyone?")

In March 1410, (Note: (Yazawin Thit Vol. 1 2012: 236) and (Hmannan Vol. 2 2003: 81): the appointment and the marriage took place after an unsuccessful five-month campaign in 771 ME (30 March 1409–29 March 1410). Since the dry season campaigns typically began after the Buddhist Lent (which ended on 23 September 1409), the appointment most probably took place in March. The 771 ME date of marriage is corroborated by a contemporary fresco writing at the Shwe Kyaung Monastery (Golden Monastery) at Pagan donated by Queen Shin Myat Hla herself. The frescos state that Thado was in his 31st year (30 years old), and Myat Hla in her 23rd (22 years old), at the time of their marriage. The earliest national chronicle Maha Yazawin (Maha Yazawin Vol. 1 2006: 327) incorrectly states that Thado was appointed governor of Mohnyin and given Myat Hla in marriage in 768 ME (1406/07). Here, the Hmannan Yazawin chronicle is inconsistent. (Hmannan Vol. 1 2003: 467) following (Maha Yazawin Vol. 1 2006: 327) gives 768 ME (1406/07) while (Hmannan Vol. 2 2003: 81) following (Yazawin Thit Vol. 1 2012: 236) accepts 771 ME (1409/1410), citing the fresco writings at the Golden Monastery in Pagan.) King Minkhaung appointed Thado sawbwa (governor general) of Mohnyin, a major Shan-speaking state (in present-day central Kachin State) near the Chinese border. The appointment came after Minkhaung's lengthy deliberation with his Chief Minister Min Yaza as to how best to deal with the kingdom's rapidly deteriorating relations with China. As a parting gift, the king also gave one of his queens, Shin Myat Hla, in marriage to Thado. For his part, Thado recognized the significance of, and the risk associated with the appointment; he sought out governing advice from Min Yaza before departing for the northern state.

== Sawbwa of Mohnyin ==
Thado would spend the next 16 years in Mohnyin, and use his northern base to take over the Ava throne itself in 1426. His successful rule at Mohnyin earned him the monikers Mohnyin Thado (lit. "Thado of Mohnyin"), and Mohnyin Min Taya (lit. "Righteous Lord of Mohnyin") the names by which he is best known in Burmese history. (Note: Chronicles refer to him as Mohnyin Thado or Mohnyin Min Taya. For example, see (Maha Yazawin Vol. 2 2006: 61), (Hmannan Vol. 2 2003: 61) for Mohnyin Min Taya; See (Maha Yazawin Vol. 2 2006: 58) and (Hmannan Vol. 2 2003: 56) for Mohnyin Thado. As for academic sources, (Harvey 1925: 96–99) and (Htin Aung 1967: 337): Mohnyinthado; (Aung-Thwin 2017: 84–89) "Mohnyin Min"; (Fernquest 2006: 51) for both.)

=== Chinese incursions (1412–1415) ===
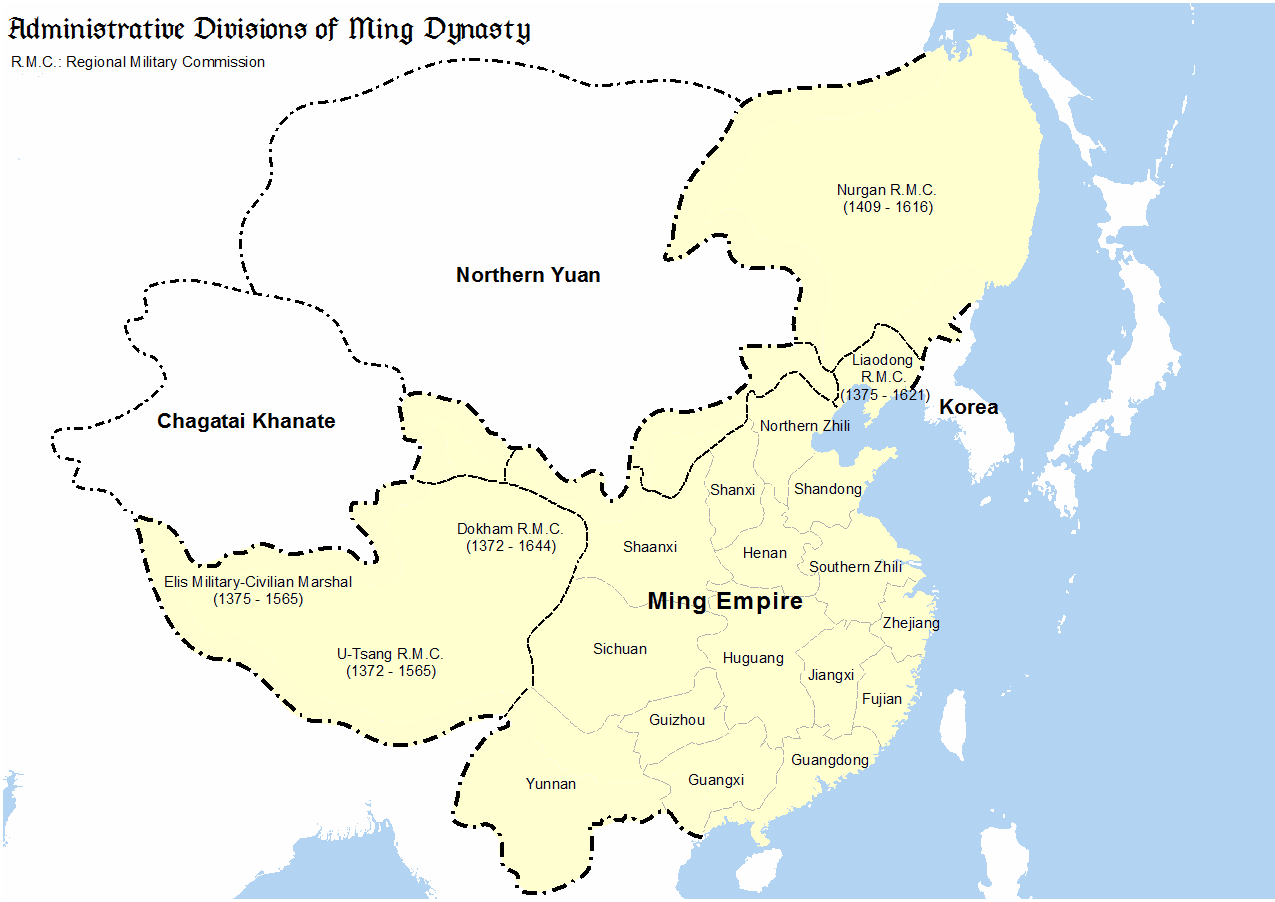
Map representing Ming Chinese claims as of 1409, which included Mohnyin and large swaths of present-day northern and eastern Myanmar. The Ming court demanded Ava to leave Mohnyin, Bhamo and Kale in 1406, and when Ava failed to comply, began planning for war in 1409.

Thado's main assignment was to serve as Ava's defence in the north. From the outset, he faced two problems: China, and the restive frontier province itself. Consisted of 19 maings (districts), (Note: (Yazawin Thit Vol. 1 2012: 225): Mohnyin proper comprised 19 maings (districts) at the time of Ava conquest in 1406. It at times controlled or attempted to control the Kale (Kalay) state, with nine maings. The Ava court decided to administer the two states separately.) Mohnyin was historically the most powerful of the Shan states that ringed the entire northern-to-eastern arc of the Ava Kingdom. At times, it even controlled other Shan states including Mogaung and Kale (Kalay), and had periodically raided the lowland states (Ava and its predecessors Sagaing and Pinya) since the 1350s. It was only in 1406 that the powerful state fell under Ava's control. (Note: Chronicles (Yazawin Thit Vol. 1 2012: 224–225) and (Hmannan Vol. 1 2003: 445–446, 467) Nyaungshwe and Mohnyin submitted in 767 ME (1405/06) and 768 ME (1406/07) respectively. (Fernquest Autumn 2006: 51): According to the Ming Shilu, Ava had acquired Mohnyin, Bhamo and Kale by 25 August 1406; in Mohnyin's case, Ava gained control of Mohnyin after a battle that killed the sawbwa of Mohnyin and his son.) While keeping order in Mohnyin was a challenge in its own right, a more immediate, pressing problem for Ava was China. Claiming that the Shan states which Ava took over in 1405–1406 were its tributaries, the Ming court had demanded Ava to end its "aggression" in the Shan states since 1406, and had considered military action against Ava since 1409. It had also sided with Hanthawaddy, recognizing the Mon-speaking kingdom as its tributary.

Yet Ava did not fully appreciate the extent of the worsening situation. Aside from posting Thado at Mohnyin, the Ava court continued to prioritize the ongoing war effort against Hanthawaddy in the south, sending down conscripts from Chinese border states like Onbaung and Nyaungshwe as late as 1410–1412. It turned out that Thado's regiment at Mohnyin was not enough to defend other northern and eastern districts. When the Chinese vassal Hsenwi invaded northeastern districts of Ava in 1412, Thado and other northern sawbwas had to hunker down until Minye Kyawswa arrived from the Arakan theatre with an army. Thado's Mohnyin regiment was part of Minye Kyawswa's 7000-strong army that stopped the Hsenwi army at Wetwin (present-day Pyin Oo Lwin). Minye Kyawswa, Prince Min Nyo and Gov. Thado fought the top Hsenwi commanders—the sawbwa of Hsenwi, alongside his son and son-in-law—on their respective war elephants, and Hsenwi forces retreated after their sawbwa was killed in combat. The Ava army went on to lay siege to Hsenwi for the next five months, and after the rainy season, c. November 1412 defeated a Chinese relief force (20,000 men and 2000 cavalry) outside Hsenwi. According to the historian G.E. Harvey, Thado was one of Minye Kyawswa's "best captains".

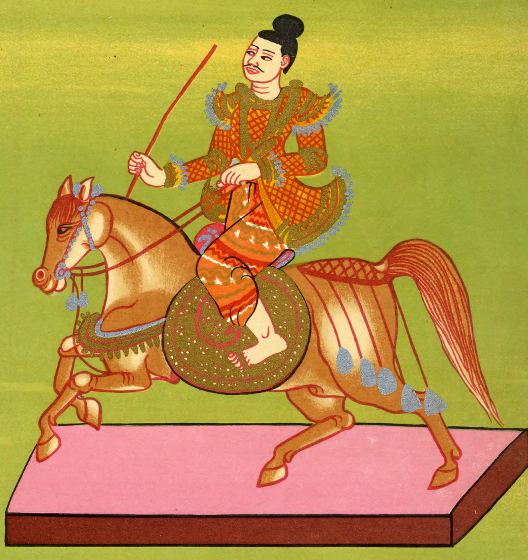
Crown Prince Minye Kyawswa, commander-in-chief of Ava forces (1410–1415)

The Hsenwi campaign turned out to be the highlight of Thado's performance in the war. He and other northern governors were again left to fend for themselves after Minye Kyawswa was reassigned to the southern front in late 1412. When the Chinese army returned in early 1413, Thado held out at Mohnyin but other less fortified towns were thoroughly rampaged by the Chinese. (According to the Ming Shilu, the Chinese destroyed over 20 cities and stockades, and brought back elephants, horses, and other goods, which were presented at the Chinese capital in September 1413.) It took Minye Kyawswa's return to drive out the Chinese-backed forces to the border in 1413–1414. Ava's northern defences finally stopped the Chinese in 1414–1415 but the star of the campaign, according to the chronicles, was Smin Bayan, a former Hanthawaddy commander. (Note: (Yazawin Thit Vol. 1 2012: 252–253) and (Hmannan Vol. 2 2003: 29–30) the Chinese army reached as far south as the capital Ava, and the Chinese retreated only after ex-Hanthawaddy commander Smin Bayan defeated the Chinese champion in single combat on horseback. However, per (Fernquest Autumn 2006: 53–54), the Ming records do not say any of their expeditions in the 1410s reached the Burmese capital, or provide any of the details found in the Burmese chronicles. The single combat story, according to (Than Tun 2011: 45), lacks credibility and "historicity".)

=== Post-war period to Ava succession crisis (1415–1425) ===
Although the Chinese incursions ended after 1415, (Note: (Fernquest 2006: 61–62): The incursions into Ava territory resumed with the Luchuan–Pingmian campaigns in the early 1440s.) with no formal peace treaty signed, Thado remained posted at Mohnyin for another decade. When the king died in 1421, Thado had emerged as one of the major sawbwas in the north, and his support was courted by Thihathu, the successor to the Ava throne. As a gesture of loyalty, Thado sent his eight-year-old middle son Nawrahta to be a page of the new king. Thihathu in turn, also in a symbolic gesture, gave the youngster the fief of Inbe, which was also Thado's former fief.

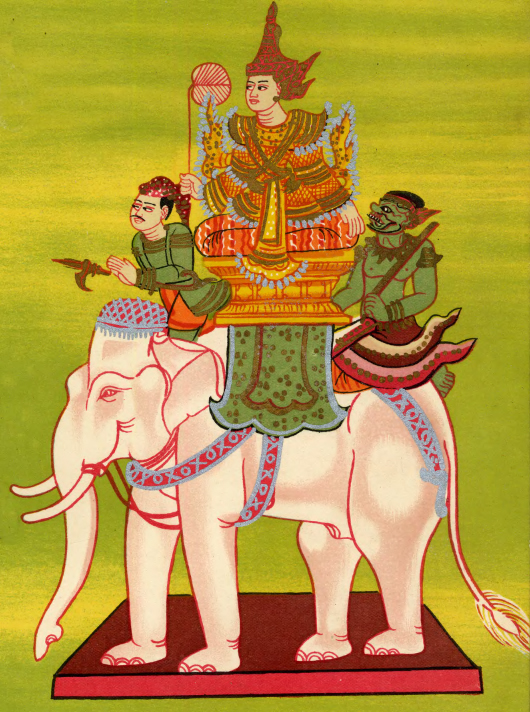
King Thihathu

Their relationship was further cemented in 1422–1423 when Thado co-led a successful campaign against Hanthawaddy. The campaign was an attempt by Thihathu to take advantage of the succession crisis in the southern kingdom. Thado commanded the main army (8000 troops, 500 cavalry, 30 war elephants) while Prince Min Nyo of Kale commanded the naval invasion force (6000 troops, 700 war boats, 200 cargo boats). The campaign was a success. The combined forces captured the entire Irrawaddy delta, and forced Prince Binnya Ran, the main pretender to the Pegu throne, to propose a peace treaty with terms favourable to Ava, including a marriage alliance between Thihathu and Princess Shin Saw Pu, Ran's sister. Thihathu accepted the proposal, and signed the treaty in 1423.

After the successful campaign, Thado's influence grew unchecked in the north. He faced little oversight from the king, who according to the chronicles (Note: (Maha Yazawin Vol. 2 2006: 57) (Yazawin Thit Vol. 1 2012: 269–270) and (Hmannan Vol. 2 2003: 57–58)) spent most of his time with Shin Saw Pu and his concubines, and did little governing. The sawbwa was well established in the north when Thihathu was assassinated in August 1425. (The assassination was carried out by the men of Gov. Le Than Bwa of Onbaung, and arranged by Queen Shin Bo-Me, Thihathu's second-ranked queen, who wanted to place her lover Prince Min Nyo on the throne.) He nominally acknowledged Thihathu's eight-year-old son and successor Min Hla, but began openly conducting his own policy. Although it is unclear if he had the legal authority to do so, Thado appointed his middle son Nawrahta, who had escaped Thihathu's assassination, as sawbwa of Wuntho.

=== Successful revolt (1425–1426) ===
His full break with Ava came in November 1425 when the Bo-Me faction assassinated the boy king, and placed Prince Nyo on the throne. The power grab was seen by many vassal rulers as illegitimate. Although the prince had a strong claim to the throne as the only son of King Tarabya of Ava (r. 1400), he received only lukewarm support from the vassals close to the capital. In the north, where Thado held sway, only Le Than Bwa of Onbaung and Baya Gamani of Singu backed Nyo, while in the south, Gov. Min Maha of Prome, a major vassal state, did not acknowledge Nyo. Still, Thado was the only vassal that would attempt to oust Nyo. Over the next three months, Thado went on to secure the support of most of the northern Shan states, including that of the powerful state of Mogaung. His authority now reached as far south as the northern Mu valley, one of the three main irrigated regions of Ava, although Nyo had not yet conceded the region. (Note: (Aung-Thwin 2017: 82) says Thado "the lord of Mohnyin, who controlled the Mu valley from his own fief..." by when Min Hla was assassinated. However, since chronicles (Yazawin Thit Vol. 1 2012: 271) and (Hmannan Vol. 2 2003: 59) say that Ava's frontlines in February 1426 began at Thissein in present-day Shwebo, in the heart of the Mu valley, Thado's reach in February 1426 would at most have been the northern Mu valley.)

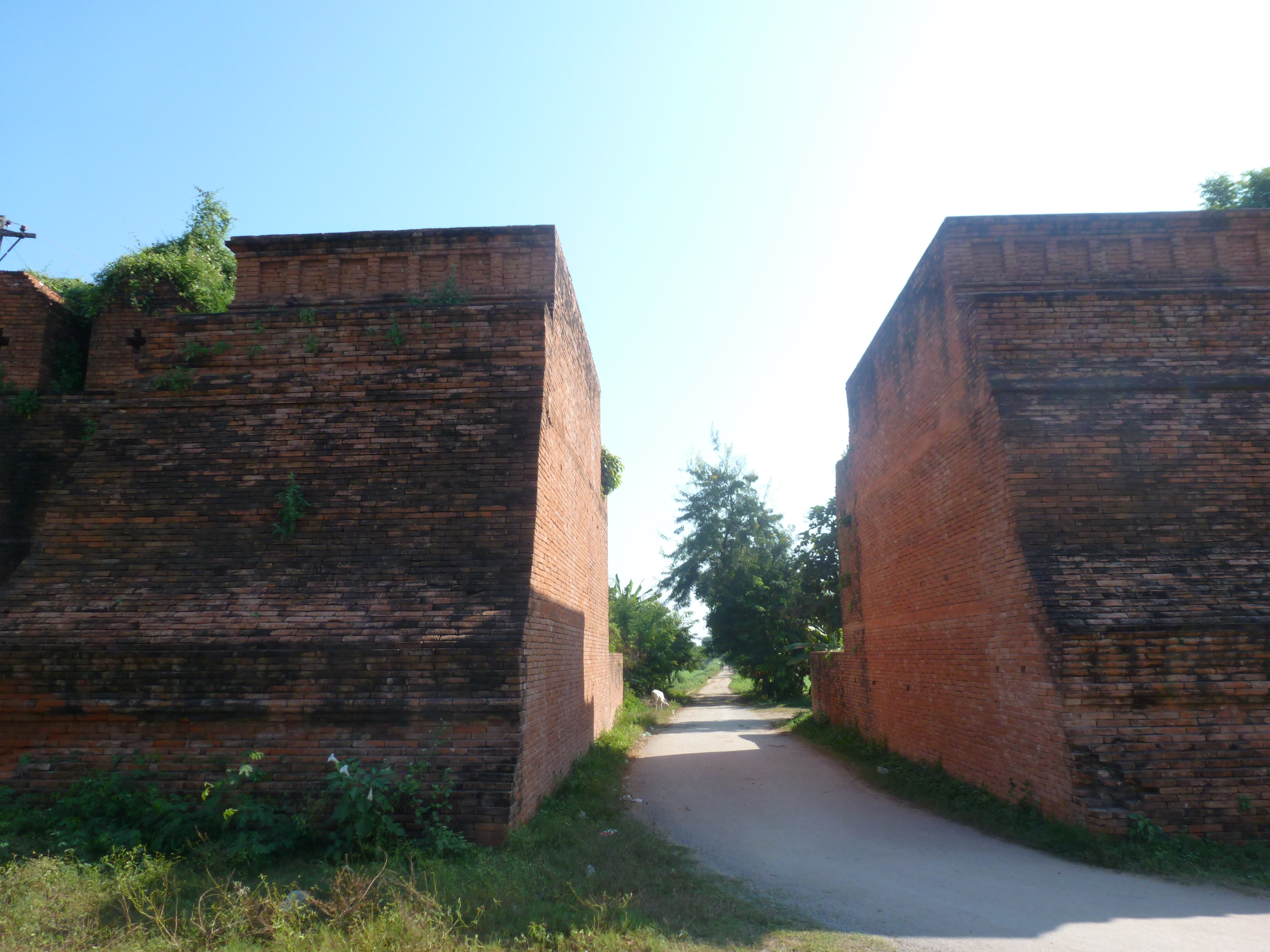
Remains of the outer walls of Ava today

His drive south began in February 1426. (Note: (Yazawin Thit Vol. 1 2012: 271) and (Hmannan Vol. 2 2003: 59): Tabaung 787 ME = 6 February 1426 to 7 March 1426) His forces faced the Ava defences led by Gov. Thray Sithu of Myinsaing, and Gov. Le Than Bwa of Onbaung. Thado's strategy was to march at a "slow, methodical, and deliberate" pace, so as to allow Nyo's unenthusiastic vassals to desert him. Even when his vanguard forces scored a surprisingly quick victory at Thissein, Thado paused the advance to recruit more troops from the region. In April, his enlarged forces defeated the 3000-man garrison at Wetchet, knocking Thray Sithu out of the war.

The victory opened the way to Sagaing, across the Irrawaddy from Ava. Here, Thado persuaded the commander of the Sagaing garrison, Le Than Bwa, to leave the fight by giving the sawbwa a substantial amount of gold and silver. (Note: (Maha Yazawin Vol. 2 2006: 60) does not specify the amount. (Yazawin Thit Vol. 1 2012: 271) says the amount of 10 viss (16.93 kg) of gold, and 50 silver cups. (Hmannan Vol. 2 2003: 59) says 3 viss (4.9 kg) of gold and 50 silver cups.) Le Than Bwa's departure created a panic across the river. All but one of the vassals guarding the perimeter around Ava renounced their ties to Nyo, and withdrew to their home regions. King Nyo and Queen Bo-Me subsequently fled the capital, and Thado entered the capital unopposed on 16 May 1426. (Note: (Yazawin Thit Vol. 1 2012: 272): Thursday, the 10th waxing of Nayon 788 ME = Wednesday, 15 May 1426. The editors of the chronicle (Yazawin Thit Vol. 1 2012: 272, footnote 3) accept Thursday, 16 May 1426.)

== Reign ==
=== Accession ===
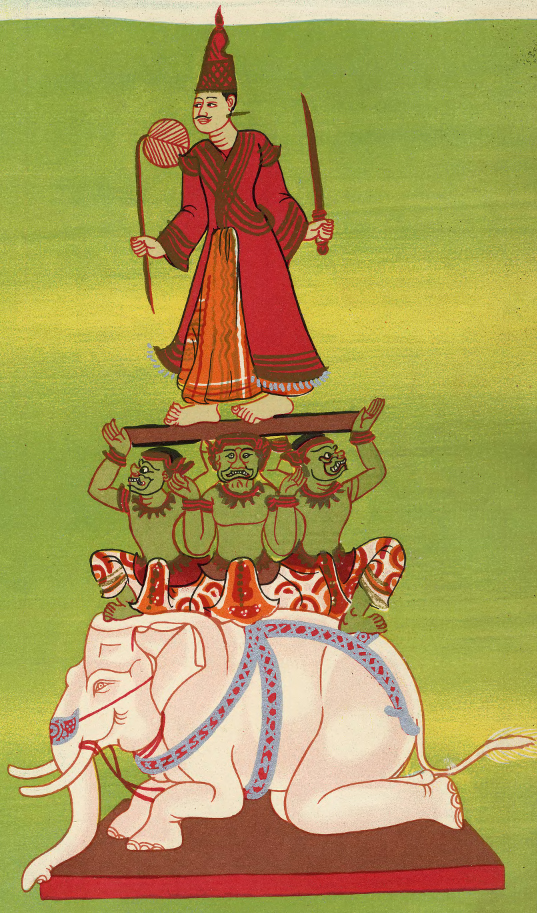
A representation of the Mahagiri nat, to which Thado's soldiers sacrificed horses and cattle to honor their lord's accession to the Ava throne

Thado formally ascended the throne on 20 May 1426 (Note: (Aung-Thwin 2017: 84) and (Maha Yazawin Vol. 2 2006: 62): Full moon of Nayon 788 ME = 20 May 1426) with the regnal title of Thiri Tri-Bawana-Ditya-Pawara-Pandita Dhamma-Yaza (သီရိ တြိဘဝနာဒိတျပဝရပဏ္ဍိတ ဓမ္မရာဇာ, Pali: Śrī Tribhavanādityapavarapaṇḍita Dhammarājā). (Note: (Maha Yazawin Vol. 2 2006: 61) gives his title as Thiri Thudhamma-Yaza (သီရိ သုဓမ္မရာဇာ) while (Yazawin Thit Vol. 1 2012: 272) gives Thiri Tri-Bawana-Ditya Pawara Pandita Dhamma-Yaza. (Hmannan Vol. 2 2003: 61) accepts Yazawin Thit's version. (Aung-Thwin 2017: 84) gives Sri Sudhammarājā following the Maha Yazawin.) He appointed his 15-year-old eldest son einshei min (heir apparent) with the title of Minye Kyawswa. His coronation is notable for the animist practices of his soldiers, who celebrated by sacrificing horses and cattle to the Mahagiri spirit.

The 46-year-old had seized the throne although the most senior princes in the line of succession—Tarabya and Minye Kyawhtin, had not given up their claim. Nor had he secured the support of the southern and eastern vassals, who considered him "at best a senior".

=== Consolidation of power ===
His initial targets were the royals with the highest claim to the throne. His troops chased King Nyo and Queen Bo-Me, and Nyo died on the run about two weeks later. Queen Bo-Me, despite her contempt for Thado, became one of his queens.

His next targets were princes Tarabya and Minye Kyawhtin, who were holding out in Pakhan, about 100km southwest of Ava. Over the next two months, Thado went on to secure the support of the vassals along the Irrawaddy—Pagan (Bagan), Sale, Sagu, Pakhan Nge, Salin and Prome (Pyay). In August, (Note: (Hmannan Vol. 2 2003: 63): Tawthalin 788 ME = 2–31 August 1426) his forces (9000 troops, 300 cavalry and 20 elephants) easily overran Pakhan, and captured both princes as well as Shin Saw Pu, a consort of Tarabya and a former queen of King Thihathu. Thado raised Pu to be his queen, and then made a fateful decision to pardon the princes, the only living son and grandson of his deceased lord, King Minkhaung. He sent Tarabya to live in an estate in Pagan, and Minye Kyawhtin to Thissein.

Next, he summoned the two main Southeastern governors, Gov. Thinkhaya III of Toungoo and Gov. Thihapate III of Taungdwin to Ava. When the governors reluctantly showed up, he wooed them by presenting lavish gifts, and treating them with respect. While the governors politely pledged allegiance to the new king, Thado's eldest son, the crown prince, was sceptical, and urged his father not to allow them to return to their fiefs. Thado dismissed his son's advice.

=== Start of rebellions and Pegu's shadow war ===
It soon turned out that the son's suspicion was correct. The two governors declared independence soon after they got back to their fiefs. By early 1427, Thado's regime was beset by a new round of rebellions: Onbaung and Mohnyin (his former fief) in the north, and Toungoo and Taungdwin in the south.

What triggered the next round was the rebellion by Prince Minye Kyawhtin, whose life was spared by Thado earlier in August. Unlike his uncle Tarabya, the prince, the eldest son of Crown Prince Minye Kyawswa (r. 1406–1415), refused to relinquish his claim to the throne. He promptly left Thissein for Onbaung where he received Le Than Bwa's backing. In late 1426, the prince and his Onbaung army invaded, reaching Yenantha, about 60 km northeast of the capital. Although Thado's main army managed to drive back Kyawhtin, the battle so close to the capital proved to be the opening for unenthusiastic vassals. In January 1427, the sawbwa of Mogaung revolted after being passed over for the governorship of Mohnyin, and seized Mohnyin. (Note: (Yazawin Thit Vol. 1 2012: 274–275) and (Hmannan Vol. 2 2003: 64–65): The sawbwa of Mogaung had fought for Thado in the brief war against Nyo. He returned to Mogaung after spending eight months in Ava—i.e. c. January 1427, expecting the governorship of Mohnyin, Thado's old post. But when Thado gave the governorship to someone else, the sawbwa revolted.) Meanwhile, the governors of Toungoo and Taungdwin had not only revolted but also enlisted the support of King Binnya Ran I of Hanthawaddy Pegu to seize Prome (Pyay). Hanthawaddy forces went on to occupy Tharrawaddy, the southernmost district of Prome.

=== Weak response to rebellions ===
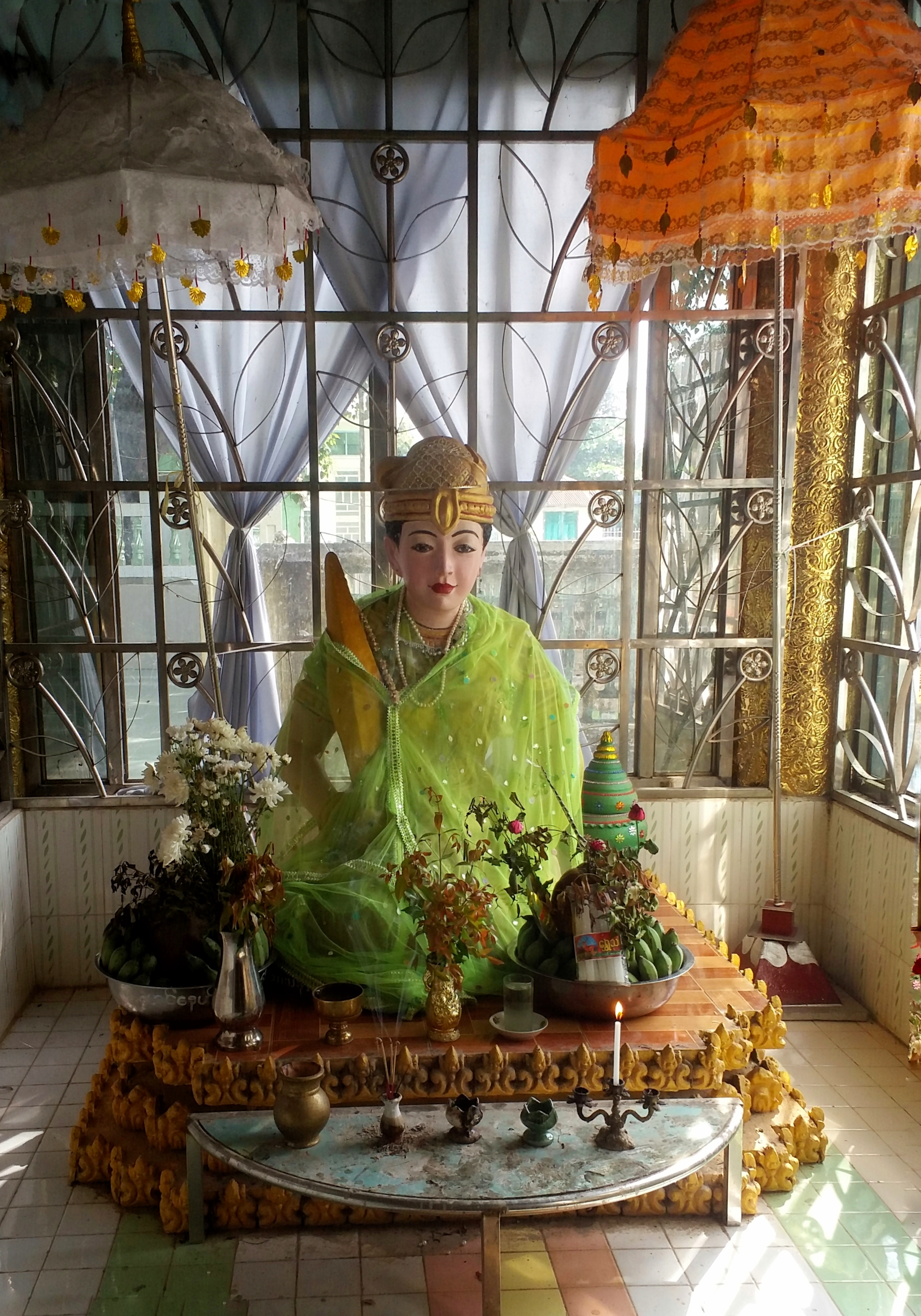
Queen Shin Saw Pu, who fled from Ava and returned to her native Pegu in 1429

Thado was ill-prepared to take on the rebellions simultaneously. He considered the defence of Prome his top priority, and deployed most of his forces in the south. But he was completely caught off guard when Kyawhtin invaded again in the next dry season. The rebel prince advanced as far as Tabetswe, just 25 km southeast of Ava. Thado had to scramble to raise a force, which could only push Kyawhtin back to Pinle, about 70 km southeast of Ava.

After the close call, Thado pursued a largely defensive policy. Aside from sending a small, unsuccessful, expedition to Pinle in the 1428–1429 dry season, he posted his forces in defensive positions at the southern and northern frontiers, appointing his second son governor of Prome, and his younger brother governor of Myedu in 1429. The appointments came soon after Queen Shin Saw Pu had managed to flee Ava, and returned to Pegu. Pu's return cleared the way for her brother Ran to press on to Prome but Thado was oblivious to the threat. He was focused on building a large Buddhist stupa for the relics brought back from Ceylon by two senior monks from Ava. (Earlier in the year, King Binnya Ran personally accompanied the monks, who had landed at Bassein (Pathein), to Prome, where the relics were transferred to forty boats sent from Ava with great fanfare.)

Thado's rivals viewed his inaction as weakness, and would soon test him. Later that year, Toungoo forces marched north, and occupied the Yamethin region with five irrigated districts. Despite still controlling Upper Burma's three main granaries—Mu valley, Minbu and a large portion of Kyaukse—Thado did not respond forcefully. His attention was largely focused on building his pagoda, the Yadana Zedi in Sagaing. Instead, upon the recommendation of his court, he sent two separate missions to Onbaung and Yat Sauk Naung Mun, asking Onbaung to withdraw its support of Kyawhtin at Pinle, and Yat Sauk to end its support of Thinkhaya at Toungoo, in exchange for Ava's recognition of the Shan-speaking states. Both missions failed to secure a deal. An emboldened Thinkhaya of Toungoo now planned an outright seizure of Prome, and went on to secure military assistance from Pegu.

=== War with Hanthawaddy (1430–1431) ===
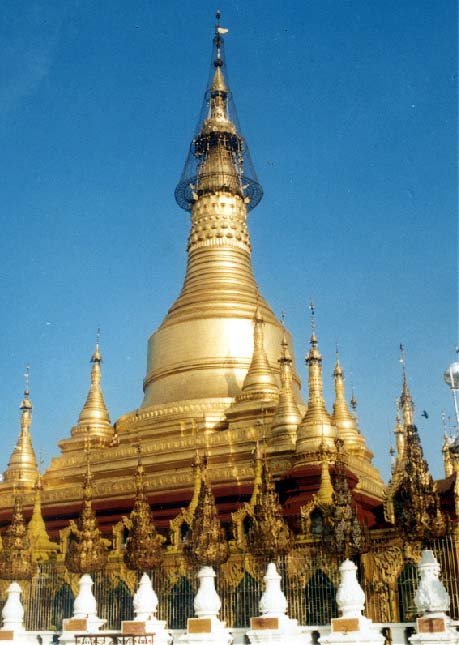
The Shwesandaw Pagoda in Prome (Pyay) where kings of the previous generation, Minkhaung I and Razadarit, swore to uphold the peace in 1403

In October 1430, Pegu and Toungoo launched a joint invasion of Prome. The 15,000-strong combined forces (Note: (Hmannan Vol. 2 2003: 71): Pegu contributed 10,000 of the 15,000 troops; Toungoo 5000.) quickly laid siege to the fortified port city on the Irrawaddy. Thado, who had devoted much of his resources on building his pagoda for the past year, was caught off guard. His court advised him that he did not have enough troops to break the siege in the south, and to defend the capital region from Pinle at the same time. He reluctantly agreed to negotiate directly with Ran, monarch-to-monarch, on the condition that Thinkhaya not be part of the negotiation.

But when the Hanthawaddy delegation showed up, Thado was shocked by Ran's demands. The Hanthawaddy king had asked Thado to acknowledge his 1427 annexation of Tharrawaddy and Paungde. Thado was so angry at the demand that he reflexively ordered the head of the Hanthawaddy delegation, Maha Thamun, executed before his Chief Minister Yazathingyan talked him out of it. He kept the delegation waiting for another three months, and continued on with the pagoda construction to its completion on 27 January 1431. (Note: Chronicles (Maha Yazawin Vol. 2 2006: 67) and (Hmannan Vol. 2 2003: 69) say the Yadana Zedi pagoda was completed on Saturday, Full Moon of Tabaung 792 ME. The editors of the Maha Yazawin as seen in (Maha Yazawin Vol. 2 2006: 67, footnote 1) translated the day as [Monday] 26 February 1431, following the calendar translation by the Universities Historical Research Center of Myanmar. However, the Research Center's calendar incorrectly assumes that 792 ME was a great leap year. The chronicle date correctly translates to Saturday, 27 January 1431 when 792 ME is treated as a regular year.)

Only after the pagoda completion ceremony did he turn his attention to the war. Prome was still under siege, albeit in a ceasefire. He had raised 13,000 troops in the three months but in the end, he decided not to fight, and largely agreed to Ran's initial terms. When he and Ran met outside Prome, he formally ceded Tharrawaddy and Paungde, and sent Princess Soe Min Wimala Dewi, a niece of the late King Minkhaung I of Ava, to Ran, in a marriage of state. (She became Ran's chief queen, and their only son Leik Munhtaw later became king of Pegu in 1453.) The only concession by Ran was to withdraw his support of Toungoo.

=== Withdrawal from governing ===
"... Having sailed up this river for a month, he arrived at a city more noble than the rest called Ava. This province abounds in elephants; the king keeps ten thousand and uses them in his wars. They fix castles on their backs from which eight to ten men fight with javelin and arrows. This animal is so intelligent that when he is battle, he frequently receives the javelins of the enemy on the sole of his foot in order that those whom he carries on his back may not be injured.

The king of this province rides on a white elephant, round the neck of which is fastened a chain of gold ornamented with precious stones, which reaches to its feet..."

— Eyewitness account c. 1435 by Venetian merchant Niccolò de' Conti, the first European to visit Burma.

Thado, however, did not make use of Ran's concession to reclaim Toungoo. Instead, he became more reclusive. He resumed constructing more temples, directing much of his rump kingdom's resources to several construction projects. In all, he would build a total of 27 new pagodas, temples and monasteries, including one at Rajagaha (ရာဇဂြိုဟ်) in India during his reign. According to a preliminary calculation by the historian Michael Aung-Thwin, the 27 projects may have cost the royal treasury 1.62 million kyats (ticals) (25,453 kg) of silver, "not including the usual endowments of people and land for their subsequent upkeep."

Reunifying the kingdom was no longer his top priority. In all, in the last 8 years of his reign, he authorized only one minor expedition: a 1433–1434 campaign led by his eldest son the crown prince to Pinle, Yamethin and Taungdwin. However, the army's strength (5000 troops, 300 cavalry, 12 elephants) was too small to capture the heavily fortified towns, spread over 70km to 250 km away from Ava. The army returned empty handed after three months.

The king would send no more expeditions. He did nothing when Thinkhaya of Toungoo died in 1435, and a power struggle broke out between Thinkhaya's son-in-law Uzana and son Saw Oo. He did nothing in 1436 when Binnya Ran, in breach of the 1431 treaty, openly marched to Toungoo with an army, and placed Saw Oo on the Toungoo throne.

=== Recalibration of the calendar ===
"At the completion of Sakarac 800... wise men from all over the Mranmma Kingdom, well versed in the pitikas and vedas debated and discussed... [the era]. After the discussion, a big and spacious pavilion was erected on the open ground at the silver market at the right of the palace, south of Ava and north of Tonpulu. In the company of princes, princesses, royal grandchildren, royal friends, royal relatives, king's governors, ministers, and military commanders, monks, brahmins, after giving away... gold, silver, precious gems, elephants, horses, servants, land, buffaloes, bulls, cows, clothes... padi... nothing lacking, in great quantities, the king eliminated the notorious, difficult and extraordinary era."

— A contemporary inscription describing the discussions to recalibrate the Burmese calendar

Thado's eccentricity only grew in his last years. By 1437, he had come to believe in the advice of court astrologers (Note: (Aung Tun 2009: 108): The two main proponents of the calendar change were the sayadaws (abbots) of the Sagyo Monastery, and the Min Kyaung Monastery.) that his rump kingdom's troubles needed to be addressed by recalibrating the Burmese calendar when it reached the year 800 ME (in 1438 CE). Aghast, the court tried to dissuade him. When told by Chief Minister Yazathingyan that kings who altered the calendar died within the year, he replied: "I could not be afraid of death, if it meant making all creatures happy. If I must die, let me die. I will not be put into a song as the king who was afraid to do his duty."

On the eleventh anniversary of his coronation, on 18 May 1437, (Note: (Maha Yazawin Vol. 2 2006: 70), (Yazawin Thit Vol. 1 2012: 281), (Hmannan Vol. 2 2003: 75): Full moon of Nayon 799 ME = 18 May 1437.) he announced at the Ava Palace that the calendar would reset to year two (not year zero), on the next new year's day (30 March 1438).

== Death and succession ==
Thado did not die within the year of recalibration as some had prophesied. He died within 13 months, days before the 13th anniversary of his reign—in April 1439. (Note: He died sometime between 30 March 1439 (new year's day of 801 ME) and 26 April 1439, the last waxing day of Nayon 801 ME. (Aung-Thwin 2017: 88–89, 323, citing (SMK Vol. 5 1998: 4)): The main chronicles and a contemporary inscription (SMK Vol. 5 1998: 4) say Thado died in 801 ME (30 March 1439 to 29 March 1440). (SMK Vol. 5 1998: 3–4): The obverse side of an 801 ME (1439/40) inscription found at the Htupayon Pagoda says King Minye Kyawswa ascended the throne in 801 ME (Arthein [Asvini] Year). The chronicles (Maha Yazawin Vol. 2 2006: 61, 72) and (Hmannan Vol. 2 2003: 61, 76) say he died as his reign was about to turn 13, having come to power in the waxing half of Nayon of 788 ME. Thus, the latest he could have died would be the last waxing day of Nayon 801 ME (26 April 1439).) He apparently had believed in the prophecy, nonetheless. The chronicles say that he spent his last months performing merit-making deeds, including granting amnesty to those arrested for larceny, marrying off his concubines that were caught cheating to their lovers, bequeathing assets to his queens and concubines, and freeing prostitutes in Ava, Pagan and Nyaung-U by paying off their debts. He was 59.

The king was succeeded by his eldest son Crown Prince Minye Kyawswa.

== Legacy ==
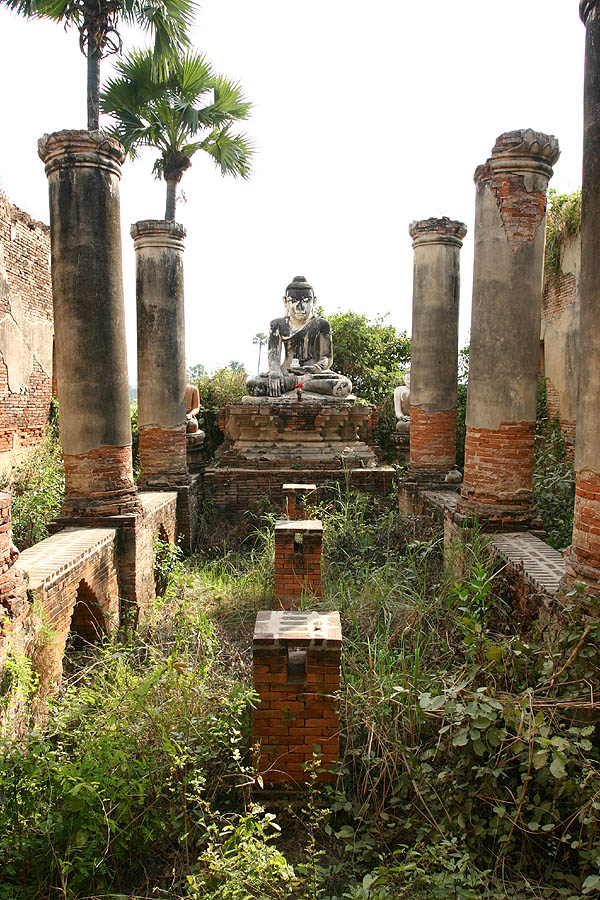
Ruins of Ava today

Although his reign was largely ineffectual, the former sawbwa of a northern peripheral state had founded a new dynasty (or a new house of the founding dynasty) based out of Ava. (Note: Some historians (Htin Aung 1967: 337) and (Lieberman 2014: 4) consider King Nyo to be the last king of the first dynasty of Ava, and King Thado to be the founder of the next dynasty while others ((Harvey 1925: 366) and (Aung-Thwin 2017: 82–84)) consider both kings to be of the same dynasty. Among the main royal chronicles, only the Yazawin Thit explicitly states that Min Nyo belonged to the previous dynasty of Thayet (သရက် ဆက်) whereas Thado founded a new one, Thado Mohnyin (သတိုး မိုးညှင်း ဆက်). Others treat Nyo and Thado to be part of the same dynasty.) The House/Dynasty of Mohnyin (မိုးညှင်း ဆက်) would lead Ava to its "apogee" in the second half of the 15th century, and rule the kingdom until 1527.

However the success of the dynasty was mainly due to the competence of his successors. In all, Thado "left many religious edifices but also political opposition." His main contribution was in leaving his successors with a relatively peaceful core region that included the most productive granaries, Mu valley, Minbu and a large portion of Kyaukse. Whereas he chose to devote the wealth and manpower of the core region on temple building, the core regions provided enough resources for his immediate successors to reunify the kingdom. Indeed, his sons kings Minye Kyawswa I (r. 1439–1442) and Narapati I (r. 1442–1468) both pursued a more militaristic policy, and recovered all of the former vassals of Ava, including those lost to Hanthawaddy, by the late 1440s.

His recalibration of the calendar did not succeed. The new era, known as Thekkarit To (သက္ကရာဇ် တို, "Short Era"), never gained popular use. The Ava court did continue to use Thekkarit To alongside the existing era at least until 1496/97 in the reign of King Minkhaung II (r. 1480–1501). (Note: See (Yazawin Thit Vol. 1 2012: 282–307) for the side-by-side use of the two eras. The last instance of dual use was 858 ME, 60 Short Era (1496/97).)

== Administration ==
=== Extent of his realm ===
His authority extended only along the narrow north-south axis of the Irrawaddy river. His southernmost garrison was in Prome (Pyay), ~400 km south of Ava while his northernmost garrison was in Myedu, ~200 km from the capital. (He might have had intermittent control further north to Myohla near Mohnyin and Bhamo. (Note: Chronicles say he built a pagoda and a monastery at "Myohla of the north" (မြောက်ဖက် မြို့လှ) during his reign. Since the north is called out, the Myohla in question may mean Myohla, Shwegu, ~400 km north of Ava in present-day Bhamo District, near the Mohnyin border, as opposed to his former fief Myohla, ~100 km from Ava, which the chronicles ((Yazawin Thit Vol. 1 2012: 273) and (Hmannan Vol. 2 2003: 62)) had simply referred to as Myohla when mentioning Thado's childhood fief. Even if the Myohla of the north was truly in the north by the Mohnyin border, Thado's control in the north was intermittent and/or nominal. (Fernquest Autumn 2006: 57): The Ming records report a 1433 rebellion against Ava near Bhamo (about 400km from Ava), which the Ming government declined to intervene because the rebelling state was "under the jurisdiction of Ava.")) He never had any control of the eastern (e.g., Onbaung and Nyaungshwe) and southeastern states (Toungoo and Taungdwin). Indeed, he did not even control Pinle, just 70 km from Ava. This narrowness is corroborated by the 27 pagodas/monasteries he built during his reign: most were located within the Myedu–Prome corridor, revealing "the extent, at least, of the areas under Ava's direct rule."

Religious Constructions Sponsored by King Thado (Note: Per (Maha Yazawin Vol. 2 2006: 71), (Yazawin Thit Vol. 1 2012: 281–282) and (Hmannan Vol. 2 2003: 75–76). See (Aung Tun 2009: 107–108) for a translation of the list in English. (Harvey 1925: 97) says Thado also built the Chanthagyi pagoda in Minbu.)
| No. | Name | Location | Description |
|---|---|---|---|
| 1. | Yadana Zedi | Sagaing | Yadana Zedi and a monastery on the precincts of the pagoda |
| 2. | Yan Aung-Myin Pagoda | Sagaing | Pagoda and monastery |
| 3. | Shwe Zigon Pagoda and monastery | Nyaungyan | His birthplace |
| 4. | Zigon Pagoda and monastery | Amyint | Pagoda and monastery |
| 5. | Pagoda and monastery | Myede | |
| 6. | Pagoda and monastery | Anya Panbyin | Since it says "Anya" (uplands), the Panbyin here does not refer to the present-day Panbyin in Taunggyi District. |
| 7. | Pagoda and monastery | Sheinbaga | His former fief |
| 8. | Pagoda and monastery | Myohla of the North | Presumably Myohla, Shwegu since the town is referred to be located in the north. |
| 9. | Old Yan Aung-Myin Pagoda and monastery | Sagaing | Rebuilt the pagoda originally built by King Minkhaung I, and constructed a monastery |
| 10. | Pagoda and monastery | Rajagaha, India | |
| 11. | Pagoda and monastery | Pakhan | |
| 12. | Pagoda and monastery | Thissein | |
| 13. | Pagoda and monastery | Taung-Kyi | |
| 14. | Pagoda and monastery | Wayindok | |
| 15. | Pagoda and monastery | Prome (Pyay) | |
| 16. | Pagoda and monastery | Pagan (Bagan) | |
| 17. | Myit-Nge Pagoda and monastery | Ava (Inwa) | |
| 18. | Shwe Myin-Mi Pagoda and monastery | Myinmi | |
| 19. | Pagoda and monastery | Ngalyingwe | |
| 20. | Pagoda and monastery | Taungpulu | |
| 21. | Pagoda and monastery | Kunzin-Kye | |
| 22. | Pagoda and monastery | Pinya | |
| 23. | East Pinya Monastery | Pinya | |
| 24. | Pagoda and monastery | Myingondaing | |
| 25. | Pagoda and monastery | Pyinzi | |
| 26. | Monastery | Htandaw | |
| 27. | Golden Monastery | Pagan | |

=== Vassal rulers ===
Thado appointed many of his closest kin to rule the key regions of his rump kingdom. Outside of Yazathingyan, his Chief Minister, and Baya Gamani of Singu, the rulers of the key states were his close relatives. Myedu in the north was ruled by his younger brother Nawrahta, who also commanded the Northern Cavalry (မြောက်ဖက်မြင်း). Prome in the south was ruled by his middle son Thihathu.

Rulers of Key Vassal States
| Vassal state | Region | Ruler (duration in office) | Notes |
|---|---|---|---|
| Pagan (Bagan) | Core | Tarabya of Pagan (1413–c. 1433); Einda Thiri Saw Hla Htut (c. 1434–?) | Einda Thiri was Thado's younger daughter |
| Pakhan | Core | Thiri Zeya Thura the elder (1426–1429); Thihapate and Shin Hla Myat (1429–1450/51) | Thiri Zeya Thura was a brother in law of Thado; Shin Hla Myat was Thado's older daughter; she and her husband Thihapate were co-governors. |
| Pyinzi | Core | Thihapate (1426–1434); Thiri Zeya Thura the younger (1434–1442) | Thiri Zeya Thura the younger was a nephew of Thado, and a son of Thiri Zeya Thura the elder and Thado's sister Shin Myat Hla. |
| Sagaing | Core | Yazathingyan (1413–1450) | |
| Singu | Central-North | Baya Gamani (c. 1401–1426, 1427–c. 1450s) | Older brother of Yazathingyan |
| Myedu | Central-North | Nawrahta (1429–?) | Younger brother of Thado, and Commandant of the Northern Cavalry |
| Prome (Pyay) | South | Min Maha (1422–1429); Thihathu III of Prome (1429–1442) | Thihathu was the second son of Thado, and future King Narapati I of Ava |
| Toungoo (Taungoo) | Southeast | Thinkhaya III (1420–1435); Uzana (1435–1436); Saw Oo II (1436–1440) | Thinkhaya revolted soon after returning from Ava in late 1426 Saw Oo was a vassal of Hanthawaddy. |
| Taungdwin | Southeast | Thihapate III (c. 1401–1441) | Not the Thihapate of Pakhan and Mohnyin; this Thihapate revolted after returning from Ava in late 1426 |
| Mohnyin | North | son of the sawbwa of Mosit (1427) | Ruled for a few weeks. Overthrown in early 1427 by Tho Ngan Bwa, the sawbwa of nearby Mogaung who had wanted the governorship of Mohnyin. |
| Mogaung | North | Tho Ngan Bwa (?–1445) | Revolted in January 1427 after Thado did not give him the governorship of Mohnyin |

== Military service ==
The following is a list of military campaigns Thado participated in as a commander or general, as reported in the royal chronicles. The campaigns he ordered but did not to go to the front are not included.

Military Campaigns of Thado
| Campaign | Period | Troops commanded | Summary |
|---|---|---|---|
| Forty Years' War | 1402 | 1 regiment | Led a regiment that guarded a convoy of 2000 pack ponies, each carrying two tins (~82 litres, ~2.25 bushels) of rice to supply Prome. Part of the vanguard army (5000 troops, 300 cavalry, 20 elephants) that tried to break the Hanthawaddy siege of Prome (Pyay). Initially driven back by Gen. Byat Za, and broke the siege only after Minkhaung arrived with 12,000 more men. |
| Ava invasion of Arakan | 1406 | 10 regiments | Deputy commander-in-chief (sitke) of the invasion army (10,000 troops, 500 cavalry, 40 elephants) under the command of Prince Minye Kyawswa. |
| Forty Years' War | 1408 | 1 regiment | Part of the disastrous invasion (with a force consisted of 22,000 troops, 2000 cavalry, 80 elephants) that began at the outset of the rainy season. Commanded one of the eight regiments of the rearguard army. |
| Forty Years' War | 1409–1410 | 1 regiment | Part of the two invasion armies (14,000 men, 1400 cavalry, 100 elephants). Appointed governor of Mohnyin for his performance. |
| Forty Years' War | 1410–1411 | none | Not part of the campaign |
| War with China | 1412 | 1 regiment | Part of the army (7000 troops, 300 cavalry, 40 elephants) that fought with Hsenwi and later Chinese forces in 1412. |
| War with China | 1413–1414 | ? | Likely part of the army (8000 troops, 400 horses and 30 elephants) that defeated the Chinese-backed forces in 1413–1414. |
| Forty Years' War | 1422–23 | 1 army (8 regiments) | Commanded one of the two armies that invaded Hanthawaddy. His army's strength was 8000 troops, 500 cavalry, 30 elephants. |
| Revolt against King Nyo | 1426 | unknown | Chronicles report the strength of the opposition King Nyo's forces only (2000 troops at Battle of Thissein and 3000 troops at Battle of Wetchet. |
| Battle of Pakhan against Tarabya II of Pakhan | 1426 | 1 army (4 regiments) | Commanded one army (4000 troops) that sailed down to Pakhan by boats. His two eldest sons commanded two other armies. |
| Ava–Pegu War | 1431 | 2 armies | Overall commander of the relief force (13,000 troops, 800 cavalry, 50 elephants) that went to the Prome front to sign the peace treaty with King Binnya Ran of Hanthawaddy. |

== Historiography ==
Chronicles do not agree on the key dates of his life and reign. All major chronicles say he was born on a Sunday in 1379. The chronicle Zatadawbon Yazawin provides conflicting information in two sections.

| Source | Birth–Death | Age | Reign | Length of reign | Reference |
|---|---|---|---|---|---|
| Zatadawbon Yazawin (List of Kings of Ava Section) | c. September/October 1378 – 1438; Thursday born | 59 (60th year) | March 1427 – 1438 | 12 | (Note: (Zata 1960: 46): Born on a Thursday in the 8th month of 740 ME (23 September; 30 September; 7 October; or 14 October 1378). Came to power in his 48th year (at age 47) in the last month of 788 ME [sic] (March 1427), reigned 12 years, and died in 800 ME (1438/39) in his 60th year (at age 59).) |
| Zatadawbon Yazawin (Horoscopes Section) | 23 October 1379 – 1439; Sunday born | 59 (60th year) | 1426–1439 | 13 | (Note: (Zata 1960: 75): Born on a Sunday with 9 nekkhats in the 8th month of 741 ME (c. 23 October 1379). Came to power in his 47th year (at age 46) and reigned 13 years. He died in his 60th year (at age 59).) |
| Maha Yazawin | c. 1379 – by 26 April 1439; Sunday born | 59 (60th year) | [6–19] May 1426 – by 26 April 1439 | 12 going on 13 | (Note: (Maha Yazawin Vol. 2 2006: 61, 72): Thado ascended the throne in the waxing half of Nayon 788 ME (6–19 May 1426) in his 47th year (at age 46). (Maha Yazawin Vol. 2 2006: 72–73): A Sunday born, Thado died in 801 ME (1439/40), having reigned almost 13 years. This means the last day he could have died by was the last waxing day of Nayon 801 ME (26 April 1439).) |
| Yazawin Thit | c. 1379 – 1439; Sunday born | 59 (60th year) | 16 May 1426 – 1439 | 13 | (Note: (Yazawin Thit Vol. 1 2012: 272): Thado entered the Ava palace on Thursday, the 10th [sic] waxing of Nayon 788 ME (Wednesday, 15 May 1426). The date was likely Thursday, 11th waxing of Nayon 788 ME (Thursday, 16 May 1426). (Yazawin Thit Vol. 1 2012: 282): A Sunday born, Thado was in his 47th year (at age 46) when he became king; he reigned 13 years, and died in 801 ME (1439/40) in his 60th year (aged 59).) |
| Hmannan Yazawin | c. 1379 – by 26 April 1439; Sunday born | 59 (60th year) | [6–19] May 1426 – by 26 April 1439 | almost 13 | (Note: (Hmannan Vol. 2 2003: 61, 76): Thado ascended the throne in the waxing half of Nayon 788 ME (6–19 May 1426) in his 47th year (at age 46). (Hmannan Vol. 2 2003: 76–78): A Sunday born, Thado died in 801 ME (1439/40) in his 60th year (at age 59), about to complete almost 13 years of reign. This means that the last day he could have died by was the last waxing day of Nayon 801 ME (26 April 1439).) |

== Family ==
=== Ancestry ===
He was a seventh generation descendant of kings Naratheinkha and Sithu II of Pagan, and a great grandson of Kyawswa I of Pinya. He was also a descendant of Chief Minister Yazathingyan of Pagan through his great-great grandmother Khin Hpone, who was a daughter of Gen. Yanda Pyissi, the younger son of Yazathingyan. (Note: See (Alaungpaya Ayedawbon 1961: 12) which traces King Alaungpaya's ancestry to Mohnyin Thado and beyond. Mohnyin Thado was a four times great-grandson of kings Naratheinkha and Sithu II.)

Ancestry of King Thado

16. Min Pe Nge of Myittha
8. Yandathu of Lanbu
17. Khin Hpone
4. Min Pale of Paukmyaing
18. Uzana I of Pinya
9. Mway Medaw of Lanbu
19. Atula Maha Dhamma Dewi of Pinya
2. Saw Diga of Mye-Ne
20. Thihathu
10. (=26) Kyawswa I of Pinya
21. Mi Saw U
5. Shwe Einthe of Paukmyaing
22. Saw Hnit of Pagan
11. Atula Sanda Dewi of Pinya
23. unnamed
1. Min Nansi
24. Min Letya of Nyaungyan
12. Min Maha of Nyaungyan
25. Saw Chit Ke
6. Saw Mun Nit of Nyaungyan
26. (=10) Kyawswa I of Pinya
13. Saw Min Hla of Nyaungyan
27. Mway Medaw of Pinya
3. Saw Pale of Nyaungyan
7. unnamed

=== Siblings ===
The eldest child, Thado had a younger brother and a younger sister.

| Sibling | Relation | Notes |
|---|---|---|
| Nawrahta of Myedu | Younger brother | Gov. of Myedu and Commandant of the Northern Cavalry |
| Shin Myat Hla (Note: (Maha Yazawin Vol. 2 2006: 61) gives his younger sister's name as Min Hla Myat. (Yazawin Thit Vol. 1 2012: 272) says the name was Shin Myat Hla, the same name as Thado's chief queen, Shin Myat Hla of Ava. (Hmannan Vol. 2 2003: 63) accepts Yazawin Thit's correction.) | Younger sister | Duchess of Pakhan (r. 1426–1429) |

=== Consorts ===
According to the Maha Yazawin, Thado had just one senior queen (mibaya), and did not formally keep queens of northern, central and western palaces. However, later chronicles, the Yazawin Thit and the Hmannan Yazawin include Shin Bo-Me, Shin Saw Pu and Shin Hla Myat as other senior queens.

| Queen | Rank | Issue |
|---|---|---|
| Shin Myat Hla | Chief queen | King Minye Kyawswa I of Ava; King Narapati I of Ava; Gov. Shin Hla Myat of Pakhan; Gov. Einda Thiri Saw Hla Htut of Pagan |
| Shin Bo-Me | Senior queen | none |
| Shin Saw Pu | Senior queen | none |
| Shin Hla Myat | Senior queen (Tazaung Mibaya) | none |

=== Issue ===
He had five children, four of which by his chief queen, and one by a concubine.

| Issue | Notes |
|---|---|
| Minye Kyawswa I of Ava | King of Ava (r. 1439–1442) |
| Narapati I of Ava | King of Ava (r. 1442–1468) |
| Shin Hla Myat | Co-Governor of Pakhan (r. 1429–1450/51); Wife of Thihapate of Pakhan and Mohnyin; Had the same name as Thado's queen Shin Hla Myat |
| Einda Thiri Saw Hla Htut | Governor of Pagan (r. c. 1434–?) |
| Ottama Thiri Zeya Nawrahta | Governor of Salin (r. 1485–1486); Governor of Dabayin; Son of a concubine |

== Bibliography ==
- Aung-Thwin, Michael A. (2017). Myanmar in the Fifteenth Century. Honolulu: University of Hawai'i Press. ISBN 978-0-8248-6783-6.
- Aung Tun, Sai (2009). History of the Shan State: From Its Origins to 1962. Chiang Mai: Silk Worm Books. ISBN 978-974-9511-43-5.
- Goh, Geok Yian (2009). Connecting and Distancing: Southeast Asia and China. Institute of Southeast Asian Studies. ISBN 9789812308566.
- Fernquest, Jon (Spring 2006). "Rajadhirat's Mask of Command: Military Leadership in Burma (c. 1348–1421)" (PDF). SBBR. 4 (1). Archived from the original (PDF) on 1 August 2019.
- Fernquest, Jon (Autumn 2006). "Crucible of War: Burma and the Ming in the Tai Frontier Zone (1382–1454)" (PDF). SOAS Bulletin of Burma Research. 4 (2). Archived from the original (PDF) on 15 April 2019.
- Harvey, G. E. (1925). History of Burma: From the Earliest Times to 10 March 1824. London: Frank Cass & Co. Ltd.
- Htin Aung, Maung (1967). A History of Burma. New York and London: Cambridge University Press.
- Kala, U (2006) [1724]. Maha Yazawin (in Burmese). Vol. 1–3 (4th printing ed.). Yangon: Ya-Pyei Publishing.
- Letwe Nawrahta; Twinthin Taikwun (1961) [c. 1770]. Hla Thamein (ed.). Alaungpaya Ayedawbon (in Burmese). Ministry of Culture, Union of Burma.
- Lieberman, Victor B. (2014) [1984]. Burmese Administrative Cycles: Anarchy and Conquest, c. 1580–1760. Princeton University Press. ISBN 978-0-691-05407-0.
- Lieberman, Victor B. (2003). Strange Parallels: Southeast Asia in Global Context, c. 800–1830, volume 1, Integration on the Mainland. Cambridge University Press. ISBN 978-0-521-80496-7.
- Maha Sithu (2012) [1798]. Myint Swe; Kyaw Win; Thein Hlaing (eds.). Yazawin Thit (in Burmese). Vol. 1–3 (2nd printing ed.). Yangon: Ya-Pyei Publishing.
- Nyein Maung, ed. (1972–1998). Shay-haung Myanma Kyauksa-mya [Ancient Burmese Stone Inscriptions] (in Burmese). Vol. 1–5. Yangon: Archaeological Department, Ministry of Culture.
- Pan Hla, Nai (2005) [1968]. Razadarit Ayedawbon (in Burmese) (8th printing ed.). Yangon: Armanthit Sarpay.
- Royal Historians of Burma (1960) [c. 1680]. U Hla Tin (Hla Thamein) (ed.). Zatadawbon Yazawin. Historical Research Directorate of the Union of Burma.
- Royal Historical Commission of Burma (2003) [1832]. Hmannan Yazawin (in Burmese). Vol. 1–3. Yangon: Ministry of Information, Myanmar.
- Sandamala Linkara, Ashin (1997–1999) [1931]. Rakhine Razawin Thit (in Burmese). Vol. 1–2. Yangon: Tetlan Sarpay.
- Sein Lwin Lay, Kahtika U (2006) [1968]. Mintaya Shwe Hti and Bayinnaung: Ketumadi Taungoo Yazawin (in Burmese) (2nd printing ed.). Yangon: Yan Aung Sarpay.
- Than Tun (December 1959). "History of Burma: A.D. 1300–1400". Journal of Burma Research Society. XLII (II).
- Than Tun (1964). Studies in Burmese History (in Burmese). Vol. 1. Yangon: Maha Dagon.
- Than Tun (2011). "Myanma Thamaing Ato-ahtwa (Burmese History Shorts)". Thamein Bayan Hso-Da Da-Ge-La (Was Thamein Bayan Real?) (in Burmese). Yangon: Gangaw Myaing: 44–46.

Mohnyin Thado Ava Kingdom Born: 23 October 1379 Died: April 1439
Regnal titles
| Preceded by Kale Kye-Taung Nyo | King of Ava; 16 May 1426 – April 1439 | Succeeded by Minye Kyawswa I |
Royal titles
| Preceded by vacant since 1406 | Sawbwa of Mohnyin by 29 March 1410–c. January 1427 | Succeeded by son of the sawbwa of Mosit |
