= Yadana Zedi Sinmya Shin Pagoda =

Buddhist Pagoda in Myanmar

- Yadana Zedi Sinmya Shin Pagoda, Sagaing, Myanmar

Religion
- Affiliation: Buddhism
- Sect: Theravada Buddhism
- Region: Sagaing
- Status: active

Location
- Country: Myanmar
- Coordinates: 21.886215°N 95.979378°E

Architecture
- Groundbreaking: 1429/30; 791 ME
- Completed: 27 January 1431; Saturday, Full Moon of Tabaung 792 ME
- Height (max): 46.6 m (153 ft) (120 cubits)

Yadana Zedi Sinmya Shin Pagoda (Burmese: ဆင်များရှင် ဘုရား) is a relic pagoda built by King Mohnyin Thado of Ava (Inwa) in 1431 in Sagaing, Myanmar.

== History ==
King Mohnyin Thado had the five relics, which were brought back from Sri Lanka in 1429/30 by the monks Ashin Sirithaddhama Linkarra and Ashin Sihana Mahasarmi, enshrined in the Yadana Zedi Sinmya Shin Pagoda on 27 January 1431. (Note: Chronicles (Maha Yazawin Vol. 2 2006: 67) and (Hmannan Vol. 2 2003: 69) say the Yadana Zedi pagoda was completed on Saturday, Full Moon of Tabaung 792 ME. The editors of the Maha Yazawin as seen in (Maha Yazawin Vol. 2 2006: 67, footnote 1) translated the day as [Monday] 26 February 1431, following the calendar translation by the Universities Historical Research Center of Myanmar. However, the Research Center's calendar incorrectly assumes that 792 ME was a great leap year. The chronicle date correctly translates to Saturday, 27 January 1431 when 792 ME is treated as a regular year.) The pagoda was named Yadana Zedi.

== Earthquake Damage ==
In 1485, the pagoda was damaged by an earthquake. King Minkhaung II had the pagoda repaired and added figures of elephants at the base of the main wall and the entrance. Due to the changes, the pagoda was given the name Sinmya Shin ("Lord of Many Elephants").

In September 2012, the pagoda was damaged yet again by an earthquake. In addition to repairing cracks in the pagoda and mending precious stones that fell from their places around the pagoda, officials set out to repair damage and wear and tear that had taken place previously. Restoration for the project was led by the Buddhist monk and scholar Sitagu Sayadaw.

== Bibliography ==
- Kala, U (2006) [1724]. Maha Yazawin (in Burmese). Vol. 1–3 (4th printing ed.). Yangon: Ya-Pyei Publishing.
- Royal Historical Commission of Burma (2003) [1832]. Hmannan Yazawin (in Burmese). Vol. 1–3. Yangon: Ministry of Information, Myanmar.
