= Princess Myaunghla =

Myaunghla Princess
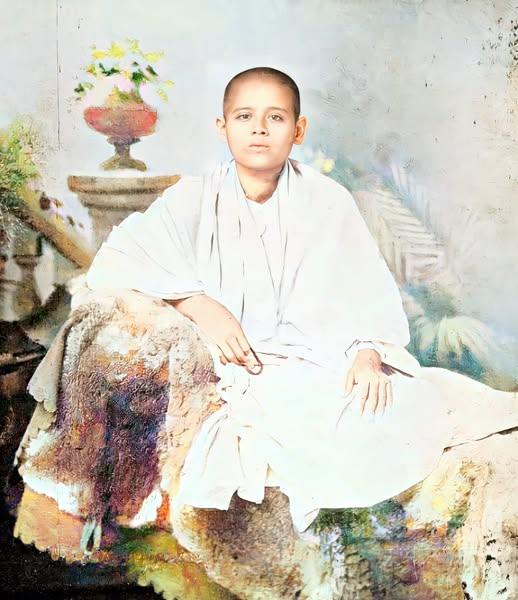
- Myaunghla Princess as a nun

Princess of Myaunghla
- Reign: circa 1864 – 1878
- Born: 1864; Mandalay
- Died: 1919 (aged 54–55); Mingun, British Burma
- Burial: Minthamee Chaung, Mingun
Regnal name
- Susirisankhavati
- House: Konbaung
- Father: Mindon Min
- Mother: Kyauktalon Mibaya

Myaunghla Princess (Burmese: မြောင်လှမင်းသမီး), also known by her royal title Thu Thiri Theika Wadi (Burmese: သုသီရိသင်္ခါဝတီ; Pali: Susirisankhavati), was a Burmese royal princess during the Konbaung dynasty. She was the only daughter of King Mindon and his junior queen, Kyauktalon Mibaya. She was one of the three royal daughters of King Mindon who embraced monastic life as nuns, alongside Salin Supaya and Supayagyi.

== Life ==
Myaunghla Princess was born in September or August 1864. At birth, she was granted the appanage of Myaunghla and bestowed the royal title Susirisankhavati by her father. After the fall of the Konbaung dynasty in 1885, the princess and her family were forced to leave the royal palace, leading to a life of uncertainty and struggle. Unaccustomed to life outside the palace and lacking practical skills, they faced great hardship. Two months after their deposition, on January 1, 1886, the British colonial government designated the queen and her daughters as third-class dependents, providing them with a monthly allowance of 50 kyat for living expenses and 30 kyat for housing expenses.

Eventually, they moved to Mingun, where both the princess and her mother entered monastic life as nuns, dedicating themselves to religious practices for the rest of their lives. The monastery where they lived is known today as Minthamee Chaung (The Princess Monastery). Her mother died in 1888. On October 15, 1902, Myaunghla Princess received an increased pension of 75 rupees from the British government. She died at the age of 55 in March 1919 due to tuberculosis and was buried in the Princess Monastery.
