= Smin Pun-Si =

14th- and 15th-century Burmese military commander; d. 1422

- သၟိင်ပန်စီ
- Born: late 1360s?
- Died: c. February 1422; Dala (Twante)
- Military career
- Allegiance: Royal Hanthawaddy Armed Forces (Navy and Army)
- Service years: by 1390–1422
- Rank: Commander
- Conflicts: Ava–Hanthawaddy War (1385–1391); Ava–Hanthawaddy War (1401–1403); Ava–Hanthawaddy War (1408–1418); Ava–Hanthawaddy War (1422–1423) (to 1422)

Smin Pun-Si (Mon: သၟိင်ပန်စီ; Burmese: သမိန်ပွန်စည်, Burmese pronunciation: [θəmèiɰ̃ pʊ́ɰ̃ zì]; d. 1422) was a Hanthawaddy commander who fought in the first four conflicts of the Forty Years' War against the northern Kingdom of Ava. A career officer serving between 1390 and 1422, Pun-Si was executed by Prince Binnya Kyan at the onset of the Ava–Hanthawaddy War (1422–1423).

== Biography ==
The name Smin Pun-Si is a Mon language title, conferred upon several Hanthawaddy commanders and court officials. (Note: The Burmese-language version of the Razadarit Ayedawbon chronicle identifies a prominent holder of the Smin Pun-Si title as the governor of Donwun, and a senior court minister during the reign of King Binnya U (r. 1348–1384). However, the Mon-language Pak Lat Chronicles record the governor's title as Smin Pun-So (Mon: သၟိင်ပန်စို, Burmese: သမိန်ပွန်စို).) This article is about the Smin Pun-Si who served between 1390 and 1422. (Note: Since chronicles do not mention a successor to the title during this period, the chronicle records presumably refer to a single individual.)

Smin Pun-Si was a senior officer in the Hanthawaddy military throughout the decades-long wars against Ava. He served as a naval squadron commander during the Battle of Gu-Htut (1390–1391), and the Battle of Prome (1402). By 1408, he commanded an army regiment on the Sittaung front during the Ava invasion of Hanthawaddy.

His final campaign took place during the 1421–1422 succession crisis. Pun-Si supported King Binnya Dhammaraza, who had recently ascended the Hanthawaddy throne. In early 1422, he and Smin Maw-Khwin were ordered to capture Dala (modern Twante), the home base of the king's rival, Prince Binnya Kyan. They successfully occupied the fortified town while Kyan was on an expedition to Dagon, about 25 km east of Dala. The commanders soon braced for Kyan's counterattack. The prince returned with two Ava regiments, and breached the town's walls despite a fierce defense. After the victory, Prince Kyan ordered the execution of both commanders for their spirited defense.

== Military service ==
The following table summarizes the military campaigns in which chronicles explicitly identify Pun-Si as a commander.

Campaign	Duration	Troops commanded (Note: Chronicle reported troop levels reduced by an order of magnitude per (Harvey 1925: 333–336))	Notes
Battle of Gu-Htut	1390–1391	1 squadron	Commanded one of four naval squadrons guarding Gu-Htut
Battle of Prome	1402	1 squadron	Commanded one of eight squadrons that blockaded Prome (Pyay).
Ava invasion of Hanthawaddy	1408	1 regiment	Commanded one of nine regiments of the Royal Main Army of Hanthawaddy
Battle of Dala	1422	1 regiment	Captured Dala, and co-commanded the Dala garrison (along with Smin Maw-Khwin

== Bibliography ==
- Kala, U (2006) [1724]. Maha Yazawin (in Burmese). Vol. 1–3 (4th printing ed.). Yangon: Ya-Pyei Publishing.
- Maha Sithu (2012) [1798]. Myint Swe; Kyaw Win; Thein Hlaing (eds.). Yazawin Thit (in Burmese). Vol. 1–3 (2nd printing ed.). Yangon: Ya-Pyei Publishing.
- Pan Hla, Nai (2005) [1968]. Razadarit Ayedawbon (in Burmese) (8th printing ed.). Yangon: Armanthit Sarpay.
- Phayre, Lt. Gen. Sir Arthur P. (1967) [1883]. History of Burma. London: Susil Gupta.
- Royal Historical Commission of Burma (2003) [1832]. Hmannan Yazawin (in Burmese). Vol. 1–3. Yangon: Ministry of Information, Myanmar.
