= Mosit =

- Location in Burma
- Coordinates: 24°13′N 96°50′E
- Country: Burma
- State: Kachin State
- District: Bhamo District
- Township: Shwegu Township

Population
  - Religions: Buddhism
- Time zone: UTC+6.30 (UTC + 6:30)

Mosit is a village in Shwegu Township in Bhamo District in the Kachin State of north-eastern Burma. Mosit is from the Shan name Möng Set, meaning "city of resistance."
