= Smin Maw-Khwin (d. 1422) =

15th-century Burmese military commander; d. 1422

- သၟိင် မုဟ်ဂွင်
- Born: ? Hanthawaddy Kingdom
- Died: c. February 1422: Dala (Twante); Hanthawaddy Kingdom
- Military career
- Allegiance: Royal Hanthawaddy Armed Forces
- Service years: ?–1422
- Rank: Commander
- Conflicts: Ava–Hanthawaddy War (1422–1423) (to 1422)

Smin Maw-Khwin (Mon: သၟိင် မုဟ်ဂွင်, (Note: Nai Pan Hla's edition of the Razadarit Ayedawbon chronicle provides two Mon language spellings: "သၟိင် မုဟ်ဂွင်", and "သၟိင် ငဝ်ခွင်". Per Pan Hla, "သၟိင် ငဝ်ခွင်" transliterates into Burmese as "သမိန် ငေါခွင်".) Burmese: သမိန် မောခွင်, Burmese pronunciation: [θəmèiɴ mɔ́ gwɪ̀ɰ̃]; d. 1422) was a Hanthawaddy commander who participated in the Ava–Hanthawaddy War (1422–1423). Following the Battle of Dala, Maw-Khwin and fellow commander Smin Pun-Si were executed by Prince Binnya Kyan for their rigorous defense of the town.

== Summary ==
The name Smin Maw-Khwin is a Mon language title, conferred upon several commanders who served the monarchs of Hanthawaddy Pegu and the First Toungoo Empire.

This Smin Maw-Khwin is first mentioned in the royal chronicles during the Pegu succession crisis of 1421–1422. (Note: Since this Maw-Khwin was a regimental commander, he most likely served in the Hanthawaddy military under a different title. However, the chronicles do not mention his previous titles.) He served as a regimental commander in the Hanthawaddy army, and was loyal to King Binnya Dhammaraza's faction.

In early 1422, he and Commander Smin Pun-Si were ordered to take Dala (modern Twante), the home base of Prince Binnya Kyan. They successfully occupied the fortified town while Kyan was on an expedition to occupy Dagon, about 25 km east of Dala.

However, the commanders soon braced for Kyan's counterattack. The prince returned with two Ava regiments. The two commanders mounted a defense but the enemy ultimately breached the town's walls. After the victory, Prince Kyan was reportedly so angered by their fierce resistance that he ordered the execution of both commanders.

== Bibliography ==
- Kala, U (2006) [1724]. Maha Yazawin (in Burmese). Vol. 1–3 (4th printing ed.). Yangon: Ya-Pyei Publishing.
- Maha Sithu (2012) [1798]. Myint Swe; Kyaw Win; Thein Hlaing (eds.). Yazawin Thit (in Burmese). Vol. 1–3 (2nd printing ed.). Yangon: Ya-Pyei Publishing.
- Myanmar Historical Commission Conference Proceedings. Vol. 3. Yangon: Myanmar Historical Commission, Golden Jubilee Publication Committee. 2005.
- Pan Hla, Nai (2005) [1968]. Razadarit Ayedawbon (in Burmese) (8th printing ed.). Yangon: Armanthit Sarpay.
- Phayre, Lt. Gen. Sir Arthur P. (1967) [1883]. History of Burma. London: Susil Gupta.
- Royal Historical Commission of Burma (2003) [1832]. Hmannan Yazawin (in Burmese). Vol. 1–3. Yangon: Ministry of Information, Myanmar.
