= Min Maha of Prome =

Min Maha; မင်းမဟာ

Governor of Sagu
- In office 1429–1442?
- Monarchs: Mohnyin Thado (1429–1439); Minye Kyawswa I (1439–42)
- Preceded by: Thiri Zeya Kyawhtin
- Succeeded by: Thinkhaya

Governor of Prome
- In office 1421/22–1429
- Monarchs: Thihathu (1421/22–25); Min Hla (1425); Kale Kye-Taung Nyo (1425–26); Mohnyin Thado (1426–29)
- Preceded by: Minye Kyawswa II
- Succeeded by: Thihathu III

Personal details
- Spouse: Shin Yun

Military service
- Branch/service: Royal Ava Army
- Unit: Elephant Corps
- Battles/wars: Forty Years' War

Min Maha (Burmese: မင်းမဟာ, [mɪ́ɴ məhà]) was governor of Prome (Pyay) from 1421/22 to 1429. He was a commander of the elephant corps in the Royal Ava Army before appointed to succeed his father-in-law Gov. Minye Kyawswa II of Prome. (Note: Chronicles are inconsistent with their own reporting. (Hmannan Vol. 2 2003: 54) says King Thihathu of Ava replaced Gov. Minye Kyawswa II of Prome with Min Maha in late 783 ME. But the Summary of the Rulers of Prome section (Hmannan Vol. 2 2003: 215) says Min Maha was appointed in 787 ME. It is another case of Burmese numerals ၃ (3) and ၇ (7) being mis-copied.) In 1429, he was reappointed to be governor of Sagu by King Mohnyin Thado.

== Bibliography ==
- Kala, U (2006) [1724]. Maha Yazawin (in Burmese). Vol. 1–3 (4th printing ed.). Yangon: Ya-Pyei Publishing.
- Maha Sithu (2012) [1798]. Myint Swe; Kyaw Win; Thein Hlaing (eds.). Yazawin Thit (in Burmese). Vol. 1–3 (2nd printing ed.). Yangon: Ya-Pyei Publishing.
- Royal Historical Commission of Burma (2003) [1832]. Hmannan Yazawin (in Burmese). Vol. 1–3. Yangon: Ministry of Information, Myanmar.

Min Maha of Prome Ava Kingdom
Royal titles
Preceded by Thiri Zeya Kyawhtin	Governor of Sagu; 1429 – 1442?	Succeeded by Thinkhaya
Preceded by Minye Kyawswa II	Governor of Prome; 1421/22 – 1429	Succeeded by Thihathu III
