= Ava–Hanthawaddy War (1430–1431) =

Military conflict in present-day Myanmar (1430–1431)

- Part of the Forty Years' War
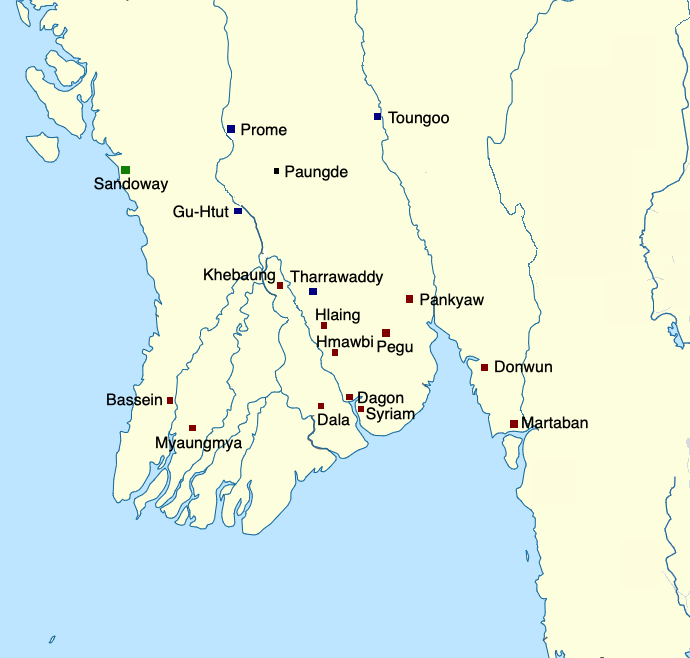
- Hanthawaddy and Toungoo forces converged on Prome
Date	October 1430 – c. February 1431
Location	Prome (Pyay) region
Result	Hanthawaddy victory; Treaty of Prome; Ava recognizes Tharrawaddy and Paungde as Hanthawaddy protectorates; Hanthawaddy breaks its alliance with Toungoo; Marriage of state between Binnya Ran and Soe Min Wimala Dewi
Territorial changes	Status quo ante bellum: Tharrawaddy and Paungde under Pegu control since 1427

Belligerents
Ava	Hanthawaddy Pegu; Toungoo

Commanders and leaders
Thado; Thihathu; Thihapate; Yazathingyan; Tuyinga Bo	Binnya Ran I; Smin Bayan; Binnya Ein; Maha Thamun; Anawrahta; Saw Lu Thinkhaya

Strength
Ava (Note: Unless otherwise stated, the military mobilization figures in this article are reduced by an order of magnitude from those reported in the royal chronicles, per G.E. Harvey's analysis in his History of Burma (1925) in the section Numerical Note (pp. 333–335).): Prome Regiment: unknown strength; Army: 5,000 troops, 800 cavalry, 50 elephants; Navy: 8,000 troops, 50 war boats, 80 transport	Hanthawaddy: Army: 5000 troops, 100 cavalry, 30 elephants; Navy: 5000 troops, 50 war boats, 20 transport; Toungoo: 5000 troops, 100 cavalry, 20 elephants

Casualties and losses
Minimal	Minimal
- See Ava–Hanthawaddy War (1430–1431) orders of battle for more information.

The Ava–Hanthawaddy War (1430–1431) (Burmese: အင်းဝ–ဟံသာဝတီ စစ် (၁၄၃၀–၁၄၃၁)) was a military conflict fought between the northern Kingdom of Ava and the southern alliance consisting of the Kingdom of Hanthawaddy Pegu and the rebel state of Toungoo. This conflict was the fifth of the decades-long wars between Ava and Pegu, both located in present-day Myanmar. Ava was forced to cede its southernmost districts to Pegu in exchange for Pegu's withdrawal of support for Toungoo.

The war's origins stemmed from the prolonged civil war in Ava that began in 1426. Viewed as a usurper by many major vassals, Thado of Mohnyin, Ava's new king, faced multiple rebellions across the kingdom. In Ava's south, Governor Saw Lu Thinkhaya formed a southern alliance, backed by King Binnya Ran I of Hanthawaddy. While Thado was preoccupied by rebellions in central Ava, the alliance went on to seize Ava's southern districts: Tharrawaddy and Paungde by Hanthawaddy in 1427, and the five irrigated districts of Yamethin by Toungoo in 1428–1429.

The war formally began when the alliance laid siege to Prome, Ava's main southern fortress, in October 1430. Unwilling to wage a long southern campaign, Thado offered to negotiate directly with King Binnya Ran. After over three months of negotiations, both sides reached agreement in February 1431. Under the Treaty of Prome, Ava formally ceded Tharrawaddy and Paungde to Hanthawaddy while Pegu agreed to withdraw its support for Toungoo. Ran also married Princess Soe Min Wimala Dewi in a marriage of state, cementing the agreement.

The war established Hanthawaddy as the ascendant power in the immediate aftermath. Toungoo was isolated, becoming a Hanthawaddy protectorate in 1436. Ava remained politically fragmented throughout the 1430s, and did not regain Toungoo until 1441, and Tharrawaddy and Paungde until 1446.

== Background ==
Ava and Hanthawaddy Pegu fought their previous war between 1422 and 1423. The war, the fourth since 1385, concluded with an alliance between King Thihathu of Ava, and Crown Prince Binnya Ran of Hanthawaddy. As part of the agreement, Ran renounced his claim on Tharrawaddy, and Thihathu withdrew his forces from the Irrawaddy delta. To cement the alliance, Thihathu married Princess Shin Saw Pu, Ran's younger sister.

After the war, Ran emerged as the strongest ruler in the fragmented southern kingdom. He seized the Hanthawaddy throne after his older half-brother and rival King Binnya Dhammaraza was assassinated in late 1424. Ran secured unity in the kingdom by granting his younger half-brother, Prince Binnya Kyan, considerable autonomy at Martaban. In exchange, Kyan agreed to share the region's lucrative commercial revenue with the crown. The arrangement succeeded, and Pegu was once again led by a strong leader.

Meanwhile, Ava spiraled towards political instability. King Thihathu neglected governing, preferring to spend time with Queen Shin Saw Pu and his concubines. In 1425, his former favorite Queen Shin Bo-Me engineered two assassinations within a three-month period: first of Thihathu, and then of his eight-year-old successor Min Hla. Bo-Me then placed her lover Prince Min Nyo of Kale on the throne, making herself the chief consort.

Unlike Binnya Ran at Pegu, Nyo was not accepted as a unifying figure. Many vassals considered his accession illegitimate. In May 1426, Governor Thado of Mohnyin, one of the key vassal rulers, drove out Nyo and Bo-Me following a three-month civil war. However, major vassals still regarded Thado as another usurper, and refused to submit. In late 1426, Prince Minye Kyawhtin with the backing of a fellow vassal Le Than Bwa of Onbaung, raised a rebellion in central Ava, sparking a new round of revolts across the kingdom.

== Prelude to war ==
=== Toungoo–Pegu alliance (1426) ===
In Ava's south, Saw Lu Thinkhaya emerged as the main opponent to Thado's regime. Thado had heavily courted him because Toungoo was strategically located in Ava's southeast bordering Hanthawaddy. Despite an offer of autonomy from Thado, Thinkhaya formally declared independence shortly after Minye Kyawhtin's revolt. Thinkhaya proceeded to form alliances with neighboring rulers, Thihapate III of Taungdwin, his younger brother Anawrahta of Paungde, and most importantly, King Binnya Ran I of Hanthawaddy.

In Pegu, Ran was eager to extend his influence into southern Ava. He readily agreed to an alliance with Thinkhaya, formalizing it with a marriage of state to Thinkhaya's daughter, Saw Min Aung. (Note: "စောမင်းအောင်" (Saw Min Aung) per the Hmannan; "စောမာန်အောင်" (Saw Man Aung) per the Toungoo Yazawin.) He also accepted Anawrahta's vassalage by marrying Anawrahta's daughter.

=== Alliance's expansion (1427–1429) ===
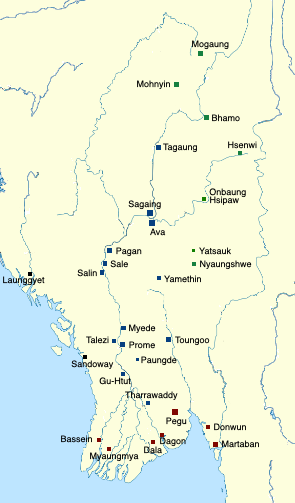
Hanthawaddy seized Tharrawaddy and Paungde in 1427, and Toungoo seized the irrigated districts of Yamethin in 1428–1429.

Initially, the developments in the south went unchallenged by Ava. Thado's regime was completely preoccupied by the Minye Kyawhtin rebellion, which threatened the Ava capital region itself. Indeed, by early 1428, Minye Kyawhtin had advanced to Pinle, just 70 km from Ava.

This allowed the southern alliance to acquire territory unimpeded. For Ran, his primary target was Tharrawaddy, Ava's southernmost district, which jutted into the Irrawaddy delta. He had long desired control over the district, having claimed it in 1422. With Paungde, the district north of Tharrawaddy, already under his control, Ran had no trouble occupying Tharrawaddy in 1427. His territory now extended to Paungde, approximately 65 km south of Prome (Pyay), Ava's main southern city and fortress. He added Tharrawaddy to Anawrahta's portfolio.

Thinkhaya too expanded his reach. While Ava forces besieged Pinle during the 1428–1429 dry season, Toungoo forces, aided by Taungdwin troops, seized the five irrigated districts of Yamethin region immediately north of Toungoo. Subsequently, the Shan state of Yatsauk, another former Ava vassal, joined the alliance to defend the region. Buoyed by their success, Toungoo forces later raided Pin, Natmauk and Thagara, districts immediately south of the Ava capital region, and brought much needed conscripts back to Toungoo.

=== Ava's nonresponse ===
Meanwhile, Ava's Pinle campaign had failed. By early 1429, the Ava court was increasingly pessimistic about defeating the rebellions militarily. In a change of strategy, Thado accepted the court's recommendation to abandon the peripheral vassals in the Shan states in order to focus on the more central regions of Pinle and Yamethin. The court sent embassies to persuade the sawbwas of Onbaung and Yatsauk to withdraw their support of Minye Kyawhtin and Thinkhaya, respectively in exchange for Ava's recognition of those states. The overtures failed.

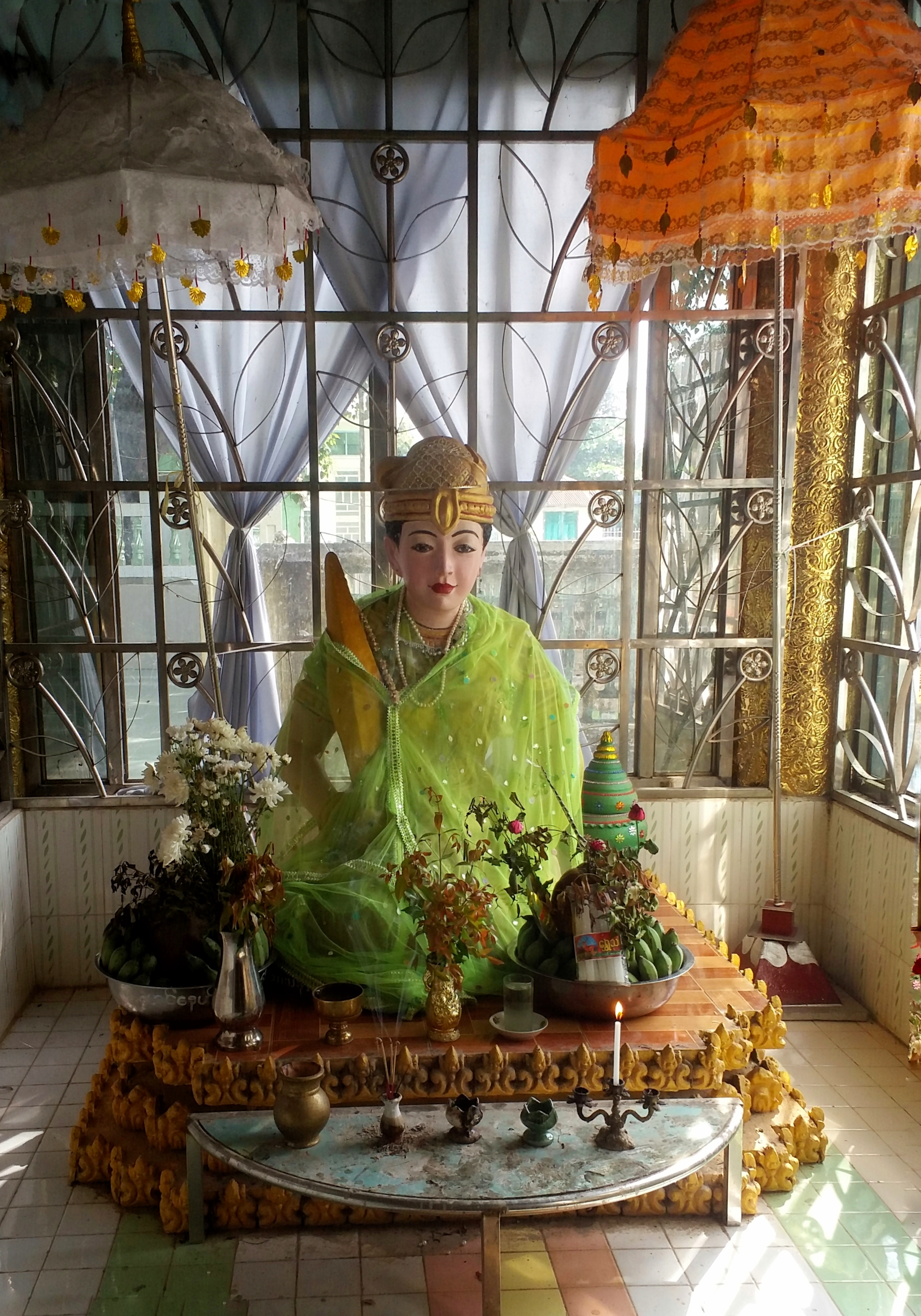
A representation of Queen Shin Saw Pu

Thado now effectively gave up on reunifying the kingdom militarily. His priority became defending the narrow Irrawaddy river valley he controlled. He also developed an interest in constructing religious monuments, ordering the construction of a new Buddhist stupa, the Yadana Zedi Pagoda, to house religious relics he had received from Ceylon. However, after Shin Saw Pu's successful escape to Pegu in late 1429, (Note: Chronicle dates regarding Queen Shin Saw Pu's return to Pegu: Maha Yazawin: Gives 796 ME (1434/35) She was in her 39th year [sic] (aged 38) that year since she was born on Wednesday, 12th waxing of Tabaung 757 ME [sic] (Saturday, 19 February 1396).; Yazawin Thit: Corrects the date to 791 ME (1429/30); Hmannan: Accepts the Yazawin Thit's correction of 791 ME. It adds that the queen was in her 36th year (aged 35), and had spent about six years and ten months in Ava. Since the chronicle says she came to Ava c. late January 1424 / early February 1424, she probably fled Ava c. November or December 1429.; Slapat: Claims she fled Ava c. 799 ME (1437/38). The 799 ME date may be a scribal copying error of the Maha Yazawin's 796 ME; (Burmese numerals "၆" (6) and "၉" (9) are similar). Furthermore, the author of the Slapat (1766) predates the Yazawin Thit correction (1798).) the court reminded Thado that Ava's main fortress Prome, surrounded by Launggyet Arakan, Hanthawaddy and Toungoo on three sides, was now highly susceptible to attack. In response, Thado appointed his second son Thihathu as governor of Prome.

=== Alliance's next target ===
As the Ava court suspected, the alliance had been eyeing Prome. Following his successful 1428–1429 campaigns, Thinkhaya proposed Ran a plan to jointly attack the southern fortress. (According to G.E. Harvey, Thinkhaya sought a much larger commitment from Ran—to install him on the Ava throne in exchange for his vassalage: "Put me on the throne of Ava, and I will be your vassal." However, the quote's source is unclear as royal chronicles do not mention Thinkhaya aiming for the Ava throne. (Note: None of the main chronicles—(Maha Yazawin 2006), (Yazawin Thit 2012), (Hmannan Yazawin 2003)—nor the regional chronicle Toungoo Yazawin (Sein Lwin Lay 2006) mention a claim by Thinkhaya to the Ava throne.))

Initially, Ran was reluctant to start a new war with Ava. He maintained good relations with Ava at least until mid-1429 when he sent a naval flotilla to escort the Ceylonese relics destined for Thado's new pagoda up the river to Prome. Ran changed his mind only after his sister Shin Saw Pu successfully returned to Pegu. The king then agreed to a limited campaign to capture Prome in the following dry season.

== War ==
=== Battle of Prome ===
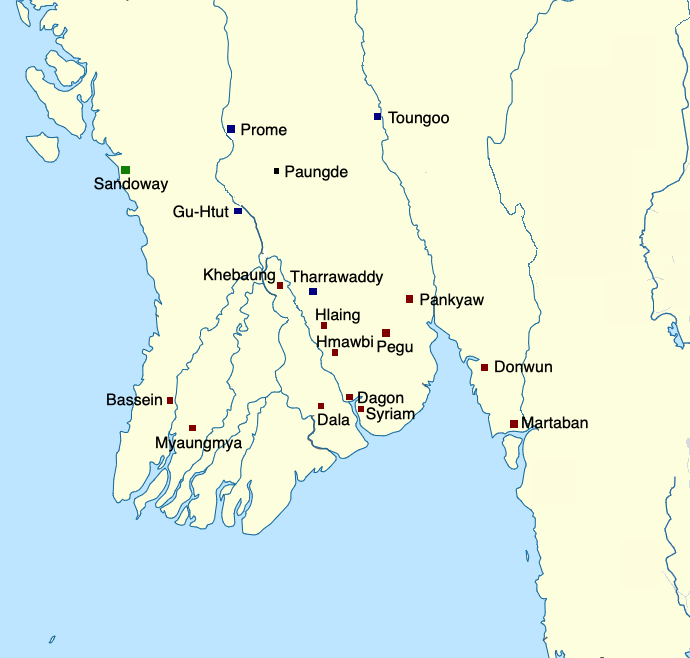
Hanthawaddy and Toungoo forces converged on Prome.

By the end of the rainy season of 1430, the alliance's joint invasion force massed for a three-pronged pincer movement against Prome. From the south, the Hanthawaddy navy (5000 troops, 50 war boats, 20 transport boats) commanded by Binnya Ein, would attack Prome via the Irrawaddy river. The Hanthawaddy army (5,000 troops, 100 cavalry, and 30 elephants) under the command of Smin Bayan would concurrently invade from their Tharrawaddy base. King Binnya Ran served as the overall commander-in-chief, sailing with the flotilla on his royal barge, Karaweik. Meanwhile, the Toungoo army, led by Thinkhaya, would advance from the east, crossing the Pegu Yoma range via the Konkhaung (ကုန်းခေါင်) Pass.

The Ava high command was unaware of the impending invasion until the last minute. Thado had spent the past year devoting significant resources to constructing his new pagoda, and had not mobilized additional troops for major campaigns. Governor Thihathu was therefore forced to rely, at least temporarily, on Prome's strong defenses, which included high brick walls and jingal wall guns. Thihathu rushed to stockpile the manpower and provisions within the city walls.

In October 1430, the joint invasion by Pegu and Toungoo began. The Hanthawaddy navy advanced unimpeded, and successfully blockaded Prome. Both the Hanthawaddy and Toungoo armies met minimal resistance as Prome's forward forces quickly retreated into the city. (Note: The main chronicles do not report any battles outside the city. The Toungoo Yazawin says Hanthawaddy and Toungoo forces jointly defeated Prome forces.) However, the invasion forces were kept at bay by the city's jingal wall guns, and the siege began.

=== Negotiations ===
At Ava, Thado scrambled for options. The Ava court called up mobilizations for the southern front but also advised the king that he lacked sufficient troops to break the siege in the south, and defend the capital region from other rebel forces (Pinle, eastern and northern Shan states as well as Yamethin). They recommended negotiating directly with Ran to convince him to withdraw Pegu's support for Toungoo. This proposed strategy paralleled the earlier attempts to negotiate with Onbaung and Yatsauk regarding the Pinle and Yamethin rebellions. Thado reluctantly agreed, and dispatched the envoy Tuyinga Bo to the Hanthawaddy camp. Bo informed Ran that Thado would negotiate directly, monarch-to-monarch, provided that Thinkhaya was excluded. Ran was receptive to the proposal but wanted more than a simple alliance with Ava. He sent an embassy led by Maha Thamun to Ava with his terms.

Ran's demands were poorly received in Ava. The primary demand required Thado to formally acknowledge Ran's 1427 annexation of Tharrawaddy and Paungde. Thado angrily ordered Maha Thamun executed before his Chief Minister Yazathingyan talked him out of it. Thado specifically objected to ceding Paungde. The Ava king kept the Hanthawaddy delegation waiting, and continued the pagoda construction to its completion on 27 January 1431. (Note: Chronicles say the Yadana Zedi pagoda was completed on Saturday, Full Moon of Tabaung 792 ME. The editors of the Maha Yazawin as seen in (Maha Yazawin Vol. 2 2006: 67, footnote 1) translated the day as [Monday] 26 February 1431, following the calendar translation by the Universities Historical Research Center of Myanmar. However, the Research Center's calendar incorrectly assumes that 792 ME was a great leap year. The chronicle date correctly translates to Saturday, 27 January 1431 when 792 ME is treated as a regular year.) Only after the completion ceremony did Thado turn his attention to the war. Circa early February 1431, Ava land and naval forces finally arrived at Prome. The army (5000 troops, 800 cavalry and 50 elephants) was led by Governor Thihapate I of Pakhan. Thado personally commanded the navy (8000 troops, 50 war boats, 80 transport/cargo boats).

Further negotiations ensued. The status of Paungde remained the main point of contention. At one point, Thado became so frustrated that he ordered Yazathingyan to arrest Smin Bayan, who was visiting Yazathingyan at the Ava camp, a clear breach of protocol.

=== Treaty of Prome ===
A peace agreement was achieved. Thado agreed to acknowledge Ran's de facto control of Paungde and Tharrawaddy—specifically recognizing Paungde as a Hanthawaddy protectorate. (Note: According to the main chronicles, Thado continued to call Gov. Anawrahta of Paungde, his kyun (vassal), and pardoned him.) The two kings formally agreed to the new border. Thado also sent Princess Soe Min Wimala Dewi, a niece of the late king Minkhaung I, to Ran in a marriage of state. Ran's sole concession was to withdraw his support of Toungoo.

Ran subsequently withdrew his forces. Thinkhaya, having been excluded from the negotiations, had already evacuated the front, and taken captives as well as captured horses and elephants back to Toungoo.

== Aftermath ==
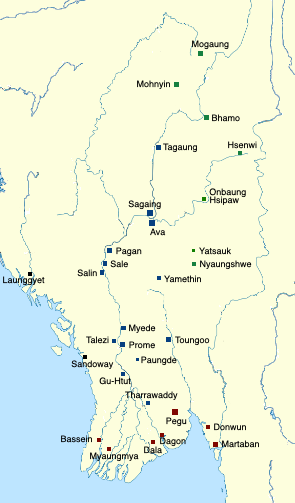
Hanthawaddy took over Toungoo in 1436 before Ava retook the region in 1441.

Ava remained politically fragmented for the remainder of Thado's reign to 1439. After the war, Thado failed to use Ran's concession to reclaim Toungoo. Instead, he became increasingly reclusive, and resumed constructing numerous temples, directing a large portion of his rump kingdom's resources to several construction projects (for a total of 27 new pagodas, temples and monasteries during his reign). In terms of military action, he authorized only one more expedition: a 1433–1434 campaign led by his eldest son Crown Prince Minye Kyawswa to Pinle, Yamethin and Taungdwin. Thado took no action when Thinkhaya of Toungoo died in 1435, and a power struggle erupted between Thinkhaya's son-in-law Uzana and son Saw Oo.

Ran initially avoided interfering in Ava's internal affairs, prioritizing good relations by making Soe Min Wimala Dewi his chief queen consort. This union produced a son, Leik Munhtaw, who later became king of Hanthawaddy for seven months between 1453 and 1454. However, after nearly a year of witnessing Thado's inaction regarding the Toungoo succession crisis, Ran decided to intervene. In 1436, the Hanthawaddy king marched to Toungoo, and placed his nominee Saw Oo on the Toungoo throne. He then appointed Uzana, the dethroned ruler, to govern a few village tracts (in either Pegu or Tharrawaddy). (Note: Maha Yazawin and Hmannan narratives are ambiguous.: In one section, Ran gave Uzana a few villages in the Kawliya district in fief before appointing him at Tharrawaddy in 1436.; In another section, Anawrahta was still governor of Paungde and Tharrawaddy in 1446.; The Toungoo Yazawin says Uzana was given the villages of Kyaukmaw, Thanzeik, Katkyaygyaung, Pyakathaung, and Taung-wa-nwe-zeik.) Thado's only response was to order a recalibration of the Burmese calendar, over the objection of the court. To be sure, Ran never formally annexed Toungoo. When Ava's new king, Minye Kyawswa (r. 1439–1442), who pursued a forceful reunification policy, sent Ava forces to retake Taungdwin and Toungoo in 1440–1441, Ran did not intervene.

The power dynamic between the two kingdoms shifted in Ava's favor in the 1440s. Ava's new king, Narapati I (r. 1442–1468)—the regnal title of Prince Thihathu of Prome—continued his late brother's policy of forceful reunification. He retook Paungde and Tharrawaddy c. October 1446, (Note: after the 5th waxing of Thadingyut 808 ME (25 September 1446)) towards the end of Ran's reign. He further exerted influence on the southern kingdom in 1450 when he sent four regiments (4000 troops, 100 cavalry, 20 elephants) to install his nominee, Binnya Kyan (r. 1450–1453), on the Hanthawaddy throne.

== Historiography ==
=== Chronicle coverages ===
The war is covered primarily in the main royal chronicles. The chronicle Maha Yazawin (1724) is the first to cover the conflict from Ava's perspective. (Note: See (Aung-Thwin 2017): "U Kala's perspective, from Upper Myanmar...", and (Fernquest Spring 2006): "the Burmese chronicle, which adds detail from Ava's Upper Burma perspective". U Kala's Mahayazawingyi, one of the first and most complete versions of the Burmese historical chronicle, will be used here (U Kala, 1961).") Regional chronicles also provide coverage: the Toungoo Yazawin (c. 1480s) contains a brief section on the war, and Slapat Rajawan (1766), the 1873 version edited by Arthur Purves Phayre, provides minimal coverage from Hanthawaddy's perspective.

The chronicle narratives have major chronological and factual discrepancies as shown in the table below.

Event	Maha Yazawin; (1724)	Yazawin Thit; (1798)	Hmannan Yazawin; (1832)	Slapat Rajawan (1766); edited by Phayre (1873)	Toungoo Yazawin (c. 1480s); edited by Sein Lwin Lay (1968)
Pegu's takeover of Tharrawaddy and Paungde	early 1427 (Note: Chronicle dates regarding Pegu's takeover of Paungde and Tharrawaddy: Maha Yazawin: Implies late 788 ME (early 1427), after the rebellions by Toungoo and Mogaung; Yazawin Thit and Hmannan: after the Mogaung sawbwa's rebellion (eight months into Thado's reign c. January 1427); Slapat: Does not mention a Paungde takeover. It claims Ran had controlled Tharrawaddy at least since early 784 ME (c. mid 1422).)	c. February 1427	c. February 1427	by mid 1422 (of Tharrawaddy)	not mentioned
Shin Saw Pu's flight to Pegu	1434/35	1429/30	late 1429	c. 1437/38	not mentioned
Toungoo's ruler during this war	Thinkhaya	Saw Oo	Thinkhaya	Thinkhaya	Thinkhaya
Battle of Prome	late 1436–early 1437 (Note: Chronicle dates regarding when the Battle of Prome took place: Maha Yazawin and Yazawin Thit: 798 ME (1436/37), implying c. November 1436 (the beginning of the dry season); Hmannan: 792 ME (1430/31); Slapat/Phayre: after 799 ME; Toungoo Yazawin: after 790 ME (1428/29), implying 791 ME (1429/30) or later)	late 1436–early 1437	c. October 1430–c. February 1431	after 1437/38	1429 or after
Thinkhaya dies	1436/37 (Note: Chronicle dates regarding Thinkhaya's death year: Maha Yazawin: 798 ME (1436/37); Yazawin Thit, Hmannan, Toungoo Yazawin: 797 ME (1435/36))	1435/36	1435/36	not mentioned	1435/36
Pegu takeover of Toungoo	1437/38 (Note: Chronicle dates regarding Pegu's intervention in Toungoo: Maha Yazawin: 799 ME (1437/38); Yazawin Thit: early 798 ME (mid-1436), suggesting it took place before the dry season of 798 ME.; Hmannan: early 798 ME (mid-1436) implied, calculated from Saw Oo's four-year reign ending in 802 ME (1440/41); Toungoo Yazawin: 798 ME (1436/37))	c. mid-1436	c. mid-1436	not mentioned	1436/37

=== Academic narratives ===
Unlike previous conflicts in the Forty Years' War, this war receives only cursory coverage in academic books on Burmese history; some such as (Hall 1950) and (Htin Aung 1967) omit it entirely. (Note: (Htin Aung 1967) does mention the Toungoo rebellion against Thado, and Queen Shin Saw Pu's flight to Pegu but not the war.) Even in the works that do cover the war, the narratives are brief and lack detail. For instance, (Phayre 1883), (Harvey 1925), and (Aung-Thwin 2017) do not explicitly date the war, only placing it during the reigns of Thado and Ran. Moreover, since the three works mention the war before covering Queen Shin Saw Pu's flight from Ava, it can be misconstrued that the conflict occurred prior to her return, contrary to the chronicle narratives. (Note: See (Phayre 1967: 83–84), (Harvey 1925: 98, 116), (Aung-Thwin 2017: 86–87, 261–262).)

Some academic narratives contain internal inconsistencies. For example, (Harvey 1925) states that Ran "never actually invaded the Ava state" in one section but in a later section says that Ran and Thinkhaya "besieged Prome until Mohnyinthado gave Binnyaran a niece to keep him quiet". Similarly, (Aung-Thwin 2017) describes Ran and Thinkhaya besieging Prome in one section; but in another section, states "there was no war between the two [Ava and Pegu]" during Ran's reign.

Event	(Phayre 1883)	(Harvey 1925)	(Aung-Thwin 2017)	(Mi Mi Hlaing 2018)
Pegu's takeover of Tharrawaddy and Paungde	Tharrawaddy [Paungde not mentioned]	event not mentioned	Tharrawaddy [Paungde not mentioned]	event not mentioned
Toungoo's ruler during this war	Saolu [Thinkhaya]	[Thinkhaya, implied] (Note: "Sawluthinkhaya 1421–36")	Sawlu Thinkhaya	alliance not mentioned
Battle of Prome	no explicit dates mentioned	no explicit dates mentioned (Note: (Harvey 1925) covers the war in two sections (pages 98 and 116), with no explicit dates. (Harvey 1925: 98) says the war lasted over three months.)	no explicit dates mentioned	1436 (Note: (Mi Mi Hlaing 2018) cites the Yazawin Thit for this date.)
Shin Saw Pu's flight to Pegu	no explicit date mentioned	1430	1429	event not mentioned
Pegu takeover of Toungoo	1437	event not mentioned	event not mentioned	event not mentioned

== Bibliography ==
- Aung-Thwin, Michael A. (2017). Myanmar in the Fifteenth Century. Honolulu: University of Hawai'i Press. ISBN 978-0-8248-6783-6.
- Fernquest, Jon (Spring 2006). "Rajadhirat's Mask of Command: Military Leadership in Burma (c. 1384–1421)" (PDF). SOAS Bulletin of Burma Research. 4 (1). Archived (PDF) from the original on 2020-03-22.
- Hall, D.G.E. (1950). Burma. London: Hutchinson House.
- Harvey, G. E. (1925). History of Burma: From the Earliest Times to 10 March 1824. London: Frank Cass & Co. Ltd.
- Hlaing, Mi Mi (2018). "States of Hostilities in the First Ava Period". Mandalay University Research Journal. 9 (1). University of Mandalay.
- Htin Aung, Maung (1967). A History of Burma (PDF). New York and London: Cambridge University Press.
- Kala, U (2006) [1724]. Maha Yazawin (in Burmese). Vol. 1–3 (4th printing ed.). Yangon: Ya-Pyei Publishing.
- Maha Sithu (2012) [1798]. Myint Swe; Kyaw Win; Thein Hlaing (eds.). Yazawin Thit (in Burmese). Vol. 1–3 (2nd printing ed.). Yangon: Ya-Pyei Publishing.
- Phayre, Major Gen. Sir Arthur P. (1873). "The History of Pegu". Journal of the Asiatic Society of Bengal. 42. Oxford University.
- Phayre, Lt. Gen. Sir Arthur P. (1967) [1883]. History of Burma. London: Susil Gupta.
- Royal Historical Commission of Burma (2003) [1832]. Hmannan Yazawin (in Burmese). Vol. 1–3. Yangon: Ministry of Information, Myanmar.
- Sein Lwin Lay, Kahtika U (2006) [1968]. Mintaya Shwe Hti and Bayinnaung: Ketumadi Taungoo Yazawin (in Burmese) (2nd printing ed.). Yangon: Yan Aung Sarpay.
