= Ava–Hanthawaddy War (1430–1431) orders of battle =

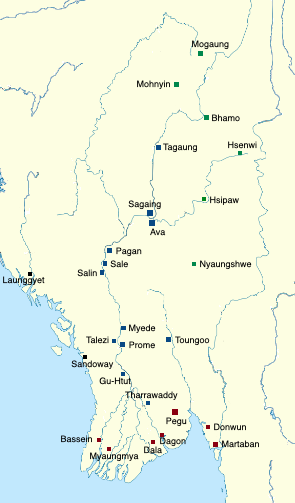
Hanthawaddy and Toungoo forces laid siege to Prome

This is a list of orders of battle for the Ava–Hanthawaddy War (1430–1431).

== Background ==
=== Sources ===
The orders of battles in this article are sourced from the main royal chronicles—the Maha Yazawin, the Yazawin Thit and the Hmannan Yazawin, which primarily narrate the war from the Ava side, as well as the Toungoo Yazawin for the Toungoo side. (Note: See the main chronicle narratives in (Maha Yazawin Vol. 2 2006: 67–70), (Yazawin Thit Vol. 1 2012: 279–280), and (Hmannan Vol. 2 2003: 71–74). See (Sein Lwin Lay 2006: 28–29) for Toungoo's contribution in the war.) The Slapat Rajawan edited by Arthur Purves Phayre also provides the Hanthawaddy-side figures.

=== Adjustment of strength figures ===
The military strength figures in this article have been reduced by an order of magnitude from those reported in the chronicles, following G.E. Harvey's and Victor Lieberman's analyses of Burmese chronicles' military strength figures in general. (Note: See (Harvey 1925: 333–335)'s "Numerical Note". (Lieberman 2014: 98) writing on the First Toungoo period concurs: "Military mobilizations were probably more of a boast than a realistic estimate. Modern industrial states have difficulty placing 10% of their people under arms.")

== Battle of Prome ==
=== Hanthawaddy–Toungoo alliance ===
Pegu–Toungoo Order of Battle, 1430–1431
Unit	Commander	Strength (Note: Unless otherwise stated, the military mobilization figures in this article are reduced by an order of magnitude from those reported in the royal chronicles, per G.E. Harvey's analysis in his History of Burma (1925) in the section Numerical Note (pp. 333–335).)	Reference(s)
Hanthawaddy Strike Force	Binnya Ran I	(6500 to) 10,000 troops, 100 cavalry, 30 elephants, 50 war boats, 20 transport boats	(Note: Naval strength: Maha Yazawin, Yazawin Thit and Hmannan Yazawin: 50,000 troops, 500 war boats, 200 ironclad hlawga transport boats; Toungoo Yazawin: 50,000 troops, 3000 cavalry [sic], 500 war boats, 200 ironclad transport boats; Slapat Rajawan (Phayre 1873): 30,000 troops; Army strength: Maha Yazawin and Yazawin Thit: 50,000 troops, 1000 cavalry, 300 war elephants, 200 pack elephants; Hmannan Yazawin: 50,000 troops, 1000 cavalry, 300 elephants; Toungoo Yazawin: 10,000 troops, 3000 cavalry, 300 elephants; Slapat Rajawan (Phayre 1873): 35,000 troops, 500 elephants)
Navy	Binnya Ein	(3000 to) 5000 troops, 50 war boats, 20 transport boats	
Army	Smin Bayan	(3500 to) 5000 troops, 100 cavalry, 30 elephants	
	including: Maha Thamun; Anawrahta of Tharrawaddy		
Toungoo Army	Thinkhaya III of Toungoo	5000 troops, 100 cavalry, 20 elephants	(Note: The Toungoo Yazawin lists the army strength as 50,000 troops, 1000 cavalry, and 200 elephants. The chronicle does not list any specific regiments of the army but does mention some of the districts from which the army conscripted: Districts Toungoo had brought under its control: Taung Nyo, Taung Kala, Yamethin, Yindaw, Wadi, Hlaingdet, and Thagara; Districts Toungoo raided: Pin, Natmauk, Kyaukpadaung.)

=== Ava ===
==== Late 1430–early 1431 ====
Ava Order of Battle, 1430–1431
Unit	Commander	Strength	Reference(s)
Prome Regiment	Thihathu of Prome	?	(Note: Chronicles do not specify the strength of Prome defenses. The commander was Thado's second son, Thihathu of Prome.)

==== c. February 1431 ====
Ava Order of Battle, c. February 1431
Unit	Commander	Strength	Reference(s)
Army	Thihapate I of Pakhan	8 regiments (5000 troops, 800 cavalry, 50 elephants)	(Note: Army strength: Maha Yazawin and Hmannan: 8 regiments (50,000 troops, 8000 cavalry, 500 elephants); Yazawin Thit: 50,000 troops, 8000 cavalry, 200 elephants)
Including...			(Note: Army strength: Maha Yazawin and Hmannan: 8 regiments (50,000 troops, 8000 cavalry, 500 elephants); Yazawin Thit: 50,000 troops, 8000 cavalry, 200 elephants)
Sagaing Regiment	Yazathingyan		(Note: Army strength: Maha Yazawin and Hmannan: 8 regiments (50,000 troops, 8000 cavalry, 500 elephants); Yazawin Thit: 50,000 troops, 8000 cavalry, 200 elephants)
Pakhan Regiment	Thihapate I of Pakhan		(Note: Army strength: Maha Yazawin and Hmannan: 8 regiments (50,000 troops, 8000 cavalry, 500 elephants); Yazawin Thit: 50,000 troops, 8000 cavalry, 200 elephants)
Navy	Thado	8 regiments (8000 troops, 50 war boats, 30 ironclad transport boats, 50 cargo boats)	(Note: Naval strength: Maha Yazawin, Hmannan: 8 regiments (80,000 troops, 500 war boats, 300 ironclad hlawga transport boats, 500 cargo boats); Yazawin Thit: no regiments mentioned (80,000 troops, 500 war boats, 300 ironclad hlawga transport boats, 500 cargo boats))
	Including: Tuyinga Bo		(Note: Naval strength: Maha Yazawin, Hmannan: 8 regiments (80,000 troops, 500 war boats, 300 ironclad hlawga transport boats, 500 cargo boats); Yazawin Thit: no regiments mentioned (80,000 troops, 500 war boats, 300 ironclad hlawga transport boats, 500 cargo boats))

== Bibliography ==
- Harvey, G. E. (1925). History of Burma: From the Earliest Times to 10 March 1824. London: Frank Cass & Co. Ltd.
- Kala, U (2006) [1724]. Maha Yazawin (in Burmese). Vol. 1–3 (4th printing ed.). Yangon: Ya-Pyei Publishing.
- Lieberman, Victor B. (2014) [1984]. Burmese Administrative Cycles: Anarchy and Conquest, c. 1580–1760. Princeton University Press. ISBN 978-0-691-05407-0.
- Maha Sithu (2012) [1798]. Myint Swe; Kyaw Win; Thein Hlaing (eds.). Yazawin Thit (in Burmese). Vol. 1–3 (2nd printing ed.). Yangon: Ya-Pyei Publishing.
- Phayre, Major Gen. Sir Arthur P. (1873). "The History of Pegu". Journal of the Asiatic Society of Bengal. 42. Oxford University.
- Royal Historical Commission of Burma (2003) [1832]. Hmannan Yazawin (in Burmese). Vol. 1–3. Yangon: Ministry of Information, Myanmar.
- Sein Lwin Lay, Kahtika U (2006) [1968]. Mintaya Shwe Hti and Bayinnaung: Ketumadi Taungoo Yazawin (in Burmese) (2nd printing ed.). Yangon: Yan Aung Sarpay.
