= Kayin Ba =

Kayin Ba ကရင်ဘ

Governor of Toungoo
- In office 1325–1342
- Monarchs: Uzana I of Pinya (1325–40); Sithu of Pinya (1340–42)
- Preceded by: Saw Hnit
- Succeeded by: Letya Sekkya

Mayor of Toungoo
- In office c. 1300s?–1325

Personal details
- Born: c. February 1253; Sunday, c. late 614 ME East Paunglaung; Pagan Empire
- Died: c. May 1342 (aged 89) c. early 704 ME Toungoo (Taungoo); Pinya Kingdom
- Children: one daughter (adopted)

Kayin Ba (Burmese: ကရင်ဘ, pronounced [kəjɪ̀ɴ ba̰]; 1253–1342) was governor of Toungoo (Taungoo) from 1325 to 1342. Prior to his governorship, the commoner had served all the rulers of the frontier state since its creation in 1279, eventually rising to mayor of Toungoo by the 1310s. Taking advantage of the rivalry between King Uzana I and Crown Prince Kyawswa I at Toungoo's overlord Pinya, he seized the governorship in 1325 by assassinating Gov. Saw Hnit. While he remained a nominal vassal of Pinya, Ba ruled the region like a sovereign ruler for the next 17 years, transforming the hitherto minor vassal state into a regional power.

== Early life and career ==
Born in early 1253, (Note: Per the chronicle Toungoo Yazawin (Sein Lwin Lay 2006: 21), he was born in 614 ME (28 March 1252 to 27 March 1253), and came to power in 687 ME (29 March 1325 to 28 March 1326) in his 73rd year (age 72). This means he was born in late 614 ME (1 January 1253 to 27 March 1253).) Kayin Ba was an athi (အသည်) (Note: (Lieberman 2003: 113): The athi were commoners who did not live on royal land. They paid substantial taxes but owed no regular military service—as opposed to the ahmudan, royal servicemen who received land grants from the crown, and were exempt from most personal taxes in exchange for regular military service.) commoner from a village east of the Paunglaung river (in present-day Taungoo District). Ba grew up to be a strong, athletic and skilled hunter, and had become the chief of his village by 1279. That year, he joined the service of Thawun Gyi and Thawun Nge, the brothers who had just founded the settlement of Toungoo, close to his village. The brothers, as the direct male descendants of their great grandfather Governor-General Ananda Thuriya, had claimed the right to rule the region, and sought allegiance from the regional chiefs.

At Toungoo, the strongly built Ba first became head of prisons. He eventually rose to become the mayor of the growing city, certainly by the 1310s. He was by then known as "Kayin Ba" (lit. "father of Kayin [child]") because he had adopted an ethnic Karen (Kayin) orphan girl. In 1317, he sided with Thawun Nge, who assassinated Thawun Gyi and seized the governorship. Thawun Nge was now in revolt of Toungoo's overlord Pinya, which was facing a serious rebellion by Sagaing in the north. Ba's son-in-law Letya Sekkya, husband of the adopted daughter, subsequently became the chief minister in the rebellious administration. At any rate, Toungoo survived the subsequent siege by Pinya, and negotiated a deal that allowed Thawun Nge to remain in office in exchange for nominal tribute.

== Governor of Toungoo ==
Ba's influence waned after the death of Thawun Nge in 1324. Thawun Nge's young son Saw Hnit succeeded the governorship but Saw Hnit's mother Saw Sala was the one that actually wielded power. Ba remained mayor but his powers were greatly curtailed. Ba decided to take action after King Thihathu of Pinya died in 1325. Seeing that Thihathu's two sons Uzana I and Kyawswa I were at loggerheads for the Pinya throne, Ba calculated that he could repeat what Thawun Nge did in 1317. He and his followers staged a coup, and put the young Saw Hnit to death. Saw Sala escaped, but died soon after on the run near Taungdwingyi. The 72-year-old Ba assumed the governorship.

Ba's calculated gamble paid off. King Uzana accepted Ba's nominal submission, and did not send a punitive expedition like in 1317–18. In the following years, the commoner practically ruled the Toungoo region like a sovereign king. He kept the region peaceful, and improved the irrigation structures of the region. The region grew in size, attracting new migrants from the north. Increased manpower in turn allowed him to maintain a sizable army, consisting of 150 war elephants.

The governor died c. May 1342. (Note: Toungoo Yazawin (Sein Lwin Lay 2006: 21) says he died in 704 ME (29 March 1342 to 28 March 1343) in his 90th year (age 89). Based on chronicles' reporting of his successors' reigns, Kayin Ba's death can be calculated to sometime between 29 March 1342 and June 1342. Per (Sein Lwin Lay 2006: 22), Gov. Htauk Hlayga ruled for 1 year and 9 months between 706 ME (29 March 1344 to 28 March 1345) and 708 ME (29 March 1346 to 29 March 1347). This means that Htauk Hlayga came to power sometime between 29 March 1344 and June 1344. Still per (Sein Lwin Lay 2006: 22), Letya Sekkya ruled for two years between 704 ME and 706 ME. This means Kayin Ba died and Letya came to power between 29 March 1342 and June 1342.) He was 89. His 17-year rule is remembered in the chronicles as a time of prosperity and when Toungoo grew to be an important state in Upper Burma. This transformation paved the way for Toungoo's eventual break from Pinya in 1358. The chronicles accord the commoner the royal status, calling him min (lord). He was succeeded by his son-in-law Letya Sekkya.

== Bibliography ==
- Lieberman, Victor B. (1984). Burmese Administrative Cycles: Anarchy and Conquest, c. 1580–1760. Princeton University Press. ISBN 0-691-05407-X.
- Maha Sithu (2012) [1798]. Kyaw Win; Thein Hlaing (eds.). Yazawin Thit (in Burmese). Vol. 1–3 (2nd printing ed.). Yangon: Ya-Pyei Publishing.
- Royal Historical Commission of Burma (2003) [1832]. Hmannan Yazawin (in Burmese). Vol. 1–3. Yangon: Ministry of Information, Myanmar.
- Sein Lwin Lay, Kahtika U (2006) [1968]. Mintaya Shwe Hti and Bayinnaung: Ketumadi Taungoo Yazawin (in Burmese) (2nd printing ed.). Yangon: Yan Aung Sarpay.

Kayin Ba Pinya Kingdom Born: c. February 1253 Died: c. May 1342
Royal titles
Preceded by Saw Hnit	Governor of Toungoo; 1325–1342	Succeeded by Letya Sekkya
