= Athinkhaya (disambiguation) =

Athinkhaya, Athinhkaya, or Thinkhaya was a Burmese ministerial and later, royal title of the Burmese monarchy. It may refer to:

== Athinkhaya ==
- Athinkhaya: Co-Regent of Myinsaing (r. 1297–1310)
- Athinkhaya Saw Yun: King of Sagaing (r. 1315–1327)
- Athinkhaya of Tagaung: Viceroy of Tagaung (r. 1340s–1351)

== Thinkhaya ==
- Thinkhaya of Pagan: Governor of Pagan (r. by 1380/81–1413)
- Thray Thinkhaya of Pinle: Governor of Pinle (r. 1386–1427)
- Thinkhaya I of Toungoo: Governor of Toungoo (r. 1411/12–1415)
- Thinkhaya II of Toungoo: Governor of Toungoo (r. 1415–1418/19)
- Thinkhaya III of Toungoo: Governor of Toungoo (r. 1420–1426); Self-proclaimed king of Toungoo (r. 1426–1435)
