= Theingaba of Toungoo =

Theingaba သိင်္ဂပါ

King of Toungoo
- Reign: c. November 1358 – 29 March 1367
- Predecessor: himself (as governor)
- Successor: Pyanchi I

Governor of Toungoo
- Reign: c. January 1347 – c. November 1358
- Predecessor: Htauk Hlayga
- Successor: himself (as king)
- Monarch: Kyawswa I of Pinya (1347–50); Kyawswa II of Pinya (1350–58)
- Born: Unknown; Toungoo (Taungoo)?
- Died: 29 March 1367; 14th waning of Late Tagu 728 ME; Toungoo
- Issue: Pyanchi I
- Religion: Theravada Buddhism

Theingaba (Burmese: သိင်္ဂပါ, pronounced [θèiɴgəbà]; also spelled Thinhkaba) was the first king of Toungoo (Taungoo) from 1358 to 1367. Prior to his independent reign, he was governor of Toungoo for 11 years before successfully breaking away from Pinya in 1358. He spent his last two years (1365–67) resisting attempts by King Thado Minbya of Ava to reclaim Toungoo.

== Governor of Toungoo ==
Of commoner background, Theingaba first rose to prominence during the administration of Gov. Kayin Ba (1325–42). He eventually became chief minister, and ran the day-to-day affairs of the nominal vassal state of Pinya. The powerful minister continued to serve Ba's successor Letya Sekkya but was sidelined in 1344 when Htauk Hlayga seized the governorship by assassinating Sekkya. Hlayga had timed the assassination during the transition of power at Pinya, and the new king Kyawswa I of Pinya (r. 1344–50) allowed Hlayga to keep the office. Although Hlayga had been a longtime minister since the 1310s, he ultimately proved to be an incompetent ruler. About a year and nine months into Hlayga's rule, c. January 1347, (Note: Per Toungoo Yazawin (Sein Lwin Lay 2006: 22), Hlayga ruled for 1 year and 9 months between 706 ME (29 March 1344 to 28 March 1345) and 708 ME (29 March 1346 to 29 March 1347). This means that he came to power sometime between 29 March 1344 and June 1344, and lost power between December 1346 and 29 March 1347.) Theingaba successfully staged a coup, and put Hlayga to death. Like Hlayga before him, he quickly submitted to Pinya, and was allowed to keep the office.

Theingaba remained a nominal vassal of Pinya for the next decade. He pledged allegiance to King Kyawswa II of Pinya (r. 1350–59), who succeeded the Pinya throne in 1350. But the governor increasingly acted like a sovereign ruler. He conducted his own foreign policy by forging alliances with the Kingdom of Ramanya in the south; Lan Na in the east; and Taungdwin, also a vassal state of Pinya, in the west. An experienced administrator, he kept the region peaceful and prosperous. Toungoo continued to grow in size, attracting migrants from Upper Burma. Immigration from Central Burma to his geographically isolated region accelerated, starting in 1356–57 when the powerful Shan state of Mong Mao (Maw) began raiding the northernmost Central Burmese state of Sagaing.

== Ruler of Toungoo ==
=== Independence from Pinya ===
His break with Pinya came shortly after. In 1357/58, Kyawswa II agreed to an alliance with Sagaing to defend against the raids. Theingaba decided not to support Pinya's war effort. The vassal ruler not only refused to provide his share of manpower to Pinya, as vassals were required to do, but also decided to go on the offensive. As the Maw Shans began their raid of Sagaing in late 1358, he raided the five key irrigated zones south of Pinya, up to Yamethin, 200 km north of Toungoo. (Note: (Yazawin Thit Vol. 1 2012: 334, footnote 3): The five irrigated zones were: Yamethin, Petpaing, Pya-Kaung (Kyidaunggan), Taung Nyo, Tamyinhsan.) Having expanded Toungoo's borders to present-day Naypyidaw, the commoner proclaimed himself king. It was a bold proclamation. His predecessors had always stopped short of complete independence, even if they ruled like sovereigns.

Pinya could not respond. Kyawswa II died in March 1359 during the latest raid, and the new king Narathu ultimately decided against a two-front war, and left Toungoo alone. Likewise, Theingaba also left Pinya alone as Narathu struggled to deal with the Maw Shan raids in the following years. In contrast, Toungoo's position became stronger by the day as Toungoo, along with Prome, continued receiving a large number of refugees fleeing the raids. In mid-1364, Theingaba's Toungoo was one of the stronger former vassal states left standing when the Maw Shans sacked both Sagaing and Pinya cities, and left Central Burma in ruins in their wake. But he watched with alarm as a young Sagaing prince named Thado Minbya emerged to reunify the core regions of Central Burma by September 1364. Thado Minbya founded the city of Ava in February 1365, and claimed all the former lands of Sagaing and Pinya Kingdoms.

=== War with Ava ===
In July 1365, Thado Minbya began his drive to reclaim the southern vassals of Pinya, starting with Pagan (Bagan) and Sagu. (Note: (Yazawin Thit Vol. 1 2012: 182, footnote 3): Thado Minbya took Pagan on Tuesday, 5th waning of Waso 727 ME (8 July 1365).) Theingaba could not allow Thado Minbya to acquire the Sagu−Minbu granary since it would give Thado Minbya all three key granaries of Central Burma. Realizing that it would be a matter of time before Ava turned to Toungoo, Theingaba decided to get involved. While Ava forces laid siege to Sagu, Theingaba sent an army led by Baya Kyawthu of Nganwegon to raid the Kyaukse district, the home region of Ava. The raid forced Thado Minbya to rush back but it also put Toungoo on the top of the young king's agenda.

Ava forces invaded Toungoo territory in 1365–66. Toungoo forces made a valiant stand at Nganwegon but after months of heavy fighting, had to retreat in 1366. Ava now controlled the five irrigated zones of the northern Sittaung valley. Theingaba now hunkered down. He did not send any aid to Taungdwin when Ava attacked the state immediately west of Toungoo in 1366–67. At any rate, he was not to see Ava attacks on Toungoo as he died on 29 March 1367. (Note: (Sein Lwin Lay 2006: 22): He died on the thingyan day as it entered the new year of 729 ME (29 March 1367). The new year's day was 30 March 1367.) His estranged son Pyanchi succeeded him, and submitted to Ava. (Note: While Pyanchi submitted to Ava per (Hmannan Vol. 1 2003: 405), he was a nominal vassal, and would later plan a rebellion in 1375 per (Hmannan Vol. 1 2003: 413–414).) Theingaba was the first Toungoo ruler to claim himself king, and successfully stayed independent.

== Bibliography ==
- Cœdès, George (1966). The Making of South East Asia. Translated by H.M. Wright. Berkeley: University of California. ISBN 9780520050617.
- Harvey, G. E. (1925). History of Burma: From the Earliest Times to 10 March 1824. London: Frank Cass & Co. Ltd.
- Maha Sithu (2012) [1798]. Kyaw Win; Thein Hlaing (eds.). Yazawin Thit (in Burmese). Vol. 1–3 (2nd printing ed.). Yangon: Ya-Pyei Publishing.
- Royal Historical Commission of Burma (2003) [1832]. Hmannan Yazawin (in Burmese). Vol. 1–3. Yangon: Ministry of Information, Myanmar.
- Sein Lwin Lay, Kahtika U (2006) [1968]. Mintaya Shwe Hti and Bayinnaung: Ketumadi Taungoo Yazawin (in Burmese) (2nd printing ed.). Yangon: Yan Aung Sarpay.
- Than Tun (December 1959). "History of Burma: A.D. 1300–1400". Journal of Burma Research Society. XLII (II).

Theingaba of Toungoo Principality of Toungoo Died: 29 March 1367
Royal titles
Preceded by Htauk Hlayga as governor	Ruler of Toungoo; 1347–1367	Succeeded by Pyanchi I as king
