= Saw Sala =

Saw Sala was a Burmese royal title.

It may mean:

- Saw Sala of Toungoo: Vicereine of Toungoo (r. 1317−24)
- Saw Sala of Sagaing: Queen of Pinya (r. 1364)
