= Sokkate (disambiguation) =

Sokkate was a Burmese royal title.

It may mean:

- Sokkate: King of Pagan (r. 1038−44)
- Sokkate of Toungoo: Governor of Toungoo (r. 1379/80−83/84)
- Sokkate of Prome: Governor of Prome (r. 1413)
