= Thawun Gyi =

Thawun Gyi သဝန်ကြီး

Ruler of Toungoo
- Reign: 17 April 1279 – c. 23 June 1317
- Predecessor: New office
- Successor: Thawun Nge
- Born: c. 1258; Pyu (Phyu); Pagan Empire
- Died: c. 23 June 1317 c. Full moon of Waso 679 ME; Toungoo (Taungoo); Pinya Kingdom
- Father: Thawun Letya
- Religion: Theravada Buddhism

Thawun Gyi (Burmese: သဝန်ကြီး, pronounced [θəwʊ̀ɴ dʑí]; c. 1258 – 1317) was the founder and first ruler of Toungoo (Taungoo), the predecessor state of the Toungoo dynasty of Myanmar. The two-times-great-grandson of King Sithu II founded Toungoo near the end of the Pagan Empire in 1279. He became one of several independent rulers of petty states after the empire's breakup in 1287. He later submitted to Myinsaing, the new power in Upper Burma. Thawun Gyi was assassinated by the men of his younger brother Thawun Nge in 1317.

== Early life ==
Thawun Gyi was the elder son of Thawun Letya, the ex-governor of Kanba Myint (ကမ်းပါးမြင့်) and Kya-Khat-Wa-Ya (ကြခတ်ဝရာ) (both in modern Taungoo District). He was born after 1256. According to the regional chronicle Toungoo Yazawin, he was born in Pyu where his father had been placed under house arrest since 1256 by a rival governor from a Mon state to the south, which most likely was Pegu (Bago). (Note: The chronicle Toungoo Yazawin does not mention the exact name of the rival governor or the exact state over which he ruled. But he was most probably Governor of Pegu, not the rebellious Gov. Nga Shwe of Martaban, who per (Hmannan Vol. 1 2003: 340–341) was in revolt for the first three years of Narapati's reign: (1) Pegu was the immediate Mon-speaking state to the south of Kanba Myint; (2) Chronicles do not say that the rebellion spread farther north to Dagon or Pegu; per (Hmannan Vol. 1 2003: 340–341), the Pagan army began the Martaban campaign from Dagon; (3) Even after the Martaban rebellion was put down in 1259, Thawun Letya remained confined to Pyu until his death in 1279. Thawun Letya would likely have been restored to office if the arresting governor were Shwe of Martaban.) The fight between the rival governors took place during a brief interregnum following the death of King Uzana of Pagan (Bagan) c. May 1256. At the capital Pagan (Bagan), a power struggle broke out between Crown Prince Thihathu and his half-brother Narathihapate. The court-backed Narathihapate emerged winner by November 1256. Since Thawun Letya remained under house arrest until his death in 1279, he may have backed Thihathu.

At Pyu, Thawun Gyi and his younger brother Thawun Nge grew up listening to their father's constant reminders about their royal descent from King Sithu II of Pagan—the two brothers were two-times-great-grandsons of Sithu II—and their rightful claim to the Kanba Myint region, which was given in fief to their ancestor Ananda Thuriya by Sithu II. Their father died in early 1279. Per Toungoo Yazawin, his last words to his two sons were to reclaim their rightful land.

== Ruler of Toungoo ==
After their father's death, the two sons along with the followers (370 households) left Pyu for the north. (Note: The detention sentence apparently did not apply to the sons.) They decided to settle at a location, about 55 km from Pyu and about 40 km south of Kanba Myint. It was named Toungoo (Taungoo) (တောင်ငူ, "Hill's Spur") because of its location by the hills in the narrow Sittaung river valley between the Bago Yoma range and southern Shan Hills. The date of foundation was 17 April 1279. (Note: Hmannan Yazawin (Hmannan Vol. 2 2003: 161) says the city was founded on 9th waxing of Kason 641 ME (Thursday, 20 April 1279). Toungoo Yazawin (Sein Lwin Lay 2006: 19) agrees with the date 9th waxing of Kason 641 ME but also says it was a Monday. It means 9th waxing is probably a typographical error. The actual date was probably Monday, 6th waxing (not 9th waxing) of Kason 641 (Monday, 17 April 1279) since Burmese numerals ၆ (6) and ၉ (9) are very similar.)

Thawun Gyi by primogeniture became the ruler. He was wary of his ambitious younger brother, who coveted the job, but made him his deputy nonetheless. He also brought in Kayin Ba, a commoner from the nearby Htihlaing village, into his inner circle, appointing him chief of law enforcement. It is not clear if he ever sought or received formal recognition from King Narathihapate. At any rate, within the four years of Toungoo's founding, the kingdom came under the Mongol invasions. By 1287, the country had been broken up into multiple rival centers, with each ruler claiming independence. Thawun Gyi never submitted to King Kyawswa (r. 1289–97), who ruled only around Pagan. He did submit later at an unspecified date to the Myinsaing rulers who by 1310 had reunified Upper Burma. The royal chronicle Hmannan Yazawin lists Toungoo as a tributary state.

== Death ==
Thawun Gyi's end came in 1317. On or right before the beginning of the Buddhist Lent that year (23 June 1317), (Note: The Lent began on Full Moon of Waso 679 ME (23 June 1317). As the pagoda was in Toungoo itself, he could have made the trip on the full moon day itself or perhaps a day or two earlier.) he was assassinated by the men of Thawun Nge while on his way to the nearby Tayahte Pagoda (modern Myat Saw Nyi-Naung Pagoda) to start his annual pilgrimage. Thawun Nge thought that it was the right time to remove his brother since their overlord King Thihathu of Pinya (not Thihathu of Pagan) was facing a serious rebellion at Sagaing. Thawun Nge's calculation proved right. Although Thihathu managed to send an army led by Crown Prince Uzana to retake Toungoo, Thawun Nge quickly submitted to the Pinya forces, and got to keep the governorship.

== Bibliography ==
- Kala, U (2006) [1724]. Maha Yazawin (in Burmese). Vol. 1–3 (4th printing ed.). Yangon: Ya-Pyei Publishing.
- Pan Hla, Nai (2005) [1968]. Razadarit Ayedawbon (in Burmese) (8th printing ed.). Yangon: Armanthit Sarpay.
- Royal Historical Commission of Burma (2003) [1832]. Hmannan Yazawin (in Burmese). Vol. 1–3. Yangon: Ministry of Information, Myanmar.
- Sein Lwin Lay, Kahtika U (2006) [1968]. Min Taya Shwe Hti and Bayinnaung: Ketumadi Taungoo Yazawin (in Burmese) (2nd printing ed.). Yangon: Yan Aung Sarpay.
- Than Tun (1964). Studies in Burmese History (in Burmese). Vol. 1. Yangon: Maha Dagon.

Thawun Gyi Pagan Dynasty Born: c. 1258 Died: c. 23 June 1317
Royal titles
New title	Ruler of Toungoo; 1279 – 1317	Succeeded by Thawun Nge
