= Phaungga of Toungoo =

Min Phaungga မင်းဖောင်းကား

Viceroy of Toungoo
- Reign: 1383 – 1397
- Predecessor: Sokkate
- Successor: Saw Oo I
- Monarch: Swa Saw Ke
- Born: c. 1350s Phaungga; Pinya Kingdom
- Died: 1397; 759 ME; Toungoo (Taungoo); Ava Kingdom
- Issue: Saw Oo I
- Religion: Theravada Buddhism

Min Phaungga (Burmese: မင်းဖောင်းကား, pronounced [mɪ́ɴ pʰàʊɴɡá]) was viceroy of Toungoo (Taungoo) from 1383 to 1397.

== Brief ==
According to the regional chronicle Toungoo Yazawin, he was a commoner born in Phaungga, a village near then capital Pinya. His personal name is unknown. The name he is known by "Min Phaungga" simply means Lord from Phaungga. He later moved to Toungoo (Taungoo) where he served in the regional administration there, rising to become a senior official by the early 1380s in the administration of Viceroy Sokkate.

In 1383, (Note: The Toungoo Yazawin chronicle (Sein Lwin Lay 2006: 24–25) says he seized the office in 745 ME (30 March 1383 to 28 March 1384), after which he submitted to Swa Saw Ke of Ava, and sent a mission to Binnya U of Pegu. But since Binnya U was already dead by 2 January 1384 per (Pan Hla 2005: 156), Phaungga's mission most probably took place sometime in mid/late 1383.) Phaungga assassinated Sokkate, who did not have a good relationship with his overlord King Swa Saw Ke of Ava. (Sokkate himself had come to power by assassinating his brother-in-law Pyanchi II four years earlier). Phaungga quickly submitted to Swa Saw Ke, who in turn appointed Phaungga viceroy. Phaungga also sent a diplomatic mission to King Binnya U of Hanthawaddy.

Despite his mission to Pegu (Bago), he contributed to his overlord Swa's war effort against Hanthawaddy (1385–1391), which ended in an uneasy truce. His frontier state did not see any more wars except for occasional raids from eastern Shan states. Toungoo Yazawin states that he was en route to Ava (Inwa) to attend a royal conference, and had to rush back to Toungoo because of a Shan incursion. He repaired and constructed several irrigation works, and built new settlements around Toungoo to house increased population. He died in 1397, and was succeeded by his son Saw Oo.

== Bibliography ==
- Pan Hla, Nai (2005) [1968]. Razadarit Ayedawbon (in Burmese) (8th printing ed.). Yangon: Armanthit Sarpay.
- Royal Historical Commission of Burma (2003) [1832]. Hmannan Yazawin (in Burmese). Vol. 1–3. Yangon: Ministry of Information, Myanmar.
- Sein Lwin Lay, Kahtika U (2006) [1968]. Min Taya Shwe Hti and Bayinnaung: Ketumadi Taungoo Yazawin (in Burmese) (2nd printing ed.). Yangon: Yan Aung Sarpay.

Phaungga of Toungoo Ava Kingdom Born: c. 1350s Died: 1397
Royal titles
Preceded by Sokkate	Viceroy of Toungoo; 1383 – 1397	Succeeded by Saw Oo I
