= Anawrahta of Tharrawaddy =

15th-century governor of Tharrawaddy and Paungde

Anawrahta Saw

Governor of Tharrawaddy
- In office early 1427 – c. October 1446
- Monarch: Binnya Ran I
- Preceded by: Saw Shwe Khet
- Succeeded by: Saw Shwe Khet

Governor of Paungde
- In office by 1420s – c. October 1446
- Monarchs: Thihathu (1421–1425); Min Hla (1425); Min Nyo (1425–1426); Thado (1426); Binnya Ran I (1427–1446)
- Preceded by: ?
- Succeeded by: ?

Personal details
- Born: c. late 1370s Ava Kingdom
- Died: c. October 1446 Ava Kingdom
- Children: Unnamed daughter

Anawrahta Saw (Burmese: အနော်ရထာ စော, pronounced [ʔənɔ̀jətʰà sɔ́]; d. c. October 1446) was governor of Tharrawaddy and Paungde from 1427 to 1446, as a vassal of Hanthawaddy Pegu. He had previously served as governor of Paungde as a vassal of Ava. In 1446, he surrendered to King Narapati I of Ava, and died shortly thereafter.

== Background ==
The royal chronicles provide minimal details regarding Anawrahta's background, noting only that he was a younger brother of Governor Saw Lu Thinkhaya of Toungoo. This indicates that he was a younger son of Governor Letwe U-Shaung-Lwe of Mindon. (Note: His father's name—title of a court minister—is spelled differently in various chronicles: Yazawin Thit (Yazawin Thit Vol. 1 2012: 336): လက်ဝဲ ဦးသျှောင်ဆွဲ (Letwe U-Shaung-Hswe); Hmannan Yazawin (Hmannan Vol. 2 2003: 165): လက်ဝဲ ဦးသျှောင်လွဲ (Letwe U-Shaung-Lwe); Toungoo Yazawin (Sein Lwin Lay 2006: 27): လက်ဝဲ ဥသျှောင်လွှဲ (Letwe U-Shaung-Hlwe)) Since Thinkhaya was born in or before 1379, Anawrahta was likely born in the late 1370s or early 1380s. (Note: Thinkhaya referred to Thado as "younger brother". This means Thinkhaya was older than but of the same generation as Thado (born 1379).)

== Career ==
=== Governor of Paungde ===
Anawrahta followed his father and brother into the royal service of Ava. By 1426, he was serving as a district-level governor of Paungde, a small district located about 65 km south of Prome (Pyay), the provincial capital. By then, his brother had risen to the rank of provincial governor of Toungoo (Taungoo), a major strategic region bordering Hanthawaddy.

Between 1425 and 1426, Anawrahta, like other vassal rulers, had to navigate the ongoing succession crisis in Ava (Inwa). Ava saw four kings between August 1425 and May 1426. The latest king, Thado of Mohnyin, could not win the support of key major vassals. When Thinkhaya formally rebelled against Thado in late 1426, Anawrahta was forced to declare his allegiance.

Anawrahta chose to follow his brother who had formed an alliance with King Binnya Ran I of Hanthawaddy. As Thinkhaya cemented the alliance by giving Ran his daughter in a marriage of state, Anawrahta likewise gave his own daughter to Ran in marriage. Unlike his brother's arrangement, however, this was not a formal alliance. Instead, as a district-level governor, Anawrahta became a vassal of Hanthawaddy.

=== Governor of Tharrawaddy Province ===
The vassalage provided both protection and a career boost. In early 1427, Ran occupied Tharrawaddy, and appointed Anawrahta as governor of that region in addition to Paungde. Anawrahta now governed a major portion of the Prome province, excluding the city of Prome, Ava's main southern fortress. He participated as a loyal Hanthawaddy vassal in the Ava–Hanthawaddy War (1430–1431) when Ran and Thinkhaya tried to capture Prome. Though Prome was not captured, the war ended with Thado formally acknowledging Ran's control of Paungde and Tharrawaddy, and symbolically "pardoning" Anawrahta.

Anawrahta governed the frontier province for the next 15 years from Tharrawaddy town. For most of this tenure, until 1442, his counterpart in Prome was Prince Thihathu, the second son of Thado. The prince had long desired to regain Prome's lost districts, and began advertising his designs soon after his accession to the Ava throne in 1442. The new king, now known by his regnal title of Narapati, gave his old post at Prome to Saw Shwe Khet, the previous governor of Tharrawaddy, and also referred to him as the governor of Tharrawaddy, declaring his intent to reclaim the region.

Despite Ava's designs, Anawrahta's tenure lasted until towards the end of Ran's reign. Circa October 1446, (Note: after the 5th waxing of Thadingyut 808 ME (25 September 1446)) the king of Ava marched south with a joint naval and land strike force to retake the territories. With no Hanthawaddy help in sight, Anawarahta offered no resistance and surrendered at Tayokmaw, south of Prome. According to the chronicles, Narapati pardoned him upon his surrender before retiring to Prome. However, Anawrahta suddenly died shortly after while Narapati was still in Prome. The king then appointed Saw Shwe Khet as Anawrahta's successor.

== Bibliography ==
- Aung-Thwin, Michael A. (2017). Myanmar in the Fifteenth Century. Honolulu: University of Hawai'i Press. ISBN 978-0-8248-6783-6.
- Kala, U (2006) [1724]. Maha Yazawin (in Burmese). Vol. 1–3 (4th printing ed.). Yangon: Ya-Pyei Publishing.
- Maha Sithu (2012) [1798]. Myint Swe; Kyaw Win; Thein Hlaing (eds.). Yazawin Thit (in Burmese). Vol. 1–3 (2nd printing ed.). Yangon: Ya-Pyei Publishing.
- Phayre, Lt. Gen. Sir Arthur P. (1967) [1883]. History of Burma. London: Susil Gupta.
- Royal Historical Commission of Burma (2003) [1832]. Hmannan Yazawin (in Burmese). Vol. 1–3. Yangon: Ministry of Information, Myanmar.
- Sein Lwin Lay, Kahtika U (2006) [1968]. Mintaya Shwe Hti and Bayinnaung: Ketumadi Taungoo Yazawin (in Burmese) (2nd printing ed.). Yangon: Yan Aung Sarpay.
