= Saw Oo I of Toungoo =

Saw Oo စောဦး

Viceroy of Toungoo
- Reign: 1397 – c. March 1399
- Predecessor: Phaungga
- Successor: Min Nemi
- Monarch: Swa Saw Ke
- Born: c. 1370s Toungoo (Taungoo)?
- Religion: Theravada Buddhism

Saw Oo (Burmese: စောဦး, pronounced [sɔ́ ʔú]) was viceroy of Toungoo (Taungoo) from 1397 to 1399. He succeeded his father Phaungga following his father's death. But Saw Oo was still a youngster, and was removed from office about two years later by King Swa Saw Ke, who wanted a more experienced governor.

He is also known as "Ya Kya Saw Oo" (ရာကျ စောဦး, "Saw Oo who lost the office").

== Bibliography ==
- Royal Historical Commission of Burma (1832). Hmannan Yazawin (in Burmese). Vol. 1–3 (2003 ed.). Yangon: Ministry of Information, Myanmar.
- Sein Lwin Lay, Kahtika U (1968). Min Taya Shwe Hti and Bayinnaung: Ketumadi Taungoo Yazawin (in Burmese) (2006, 2nd printing ed.). Yangon: Yan Aung Sarpay.

Saw Oo I of Toungoo Ava Kingdom
Royal titles
Preceded by Phaungga	Viceroy of Toungoo; 1397 – 1399	Succeeded by Min Nemi
