= Uzana of Toungoo =

Uzana of Toungoo; တောင်ငူ ဥဇနာ

King of Toungoo
- Reign: 1435 – 1436
- Predecessor: Thinkhaya III
- Successor: Saw Oo II
- Spouse: 2nd daughter of Thinkhaya III
- Religion: Theravada Buddhism

Uzana of Toungoo (Burmese: တောင်ငူ ဥဇနာ, pronounced [tàʊɴŋù ʔṵzənà]) was king of Toungoo from 1435 to 1436. After the death of his father in-law Thinkhaya III in 1435, he succeeded the throne of the petty state of Toungoo (Taungoo), which had been in revolt of Ava since 1426. But his accession was contested by his brother-in-law Saw Oo, who sought assistance from King Binnya Ran I of Hanthawaddy. Less than a year into his reign, he was overthrown by Ran who came up with an army to Toungoo.

Uzana was treated relatively well by Ran, who was a brother-in-law by marriage. (They were married to the daughters of Thinkhaya III. Binnya Ran made Uzana chief of a few villages.) Unsatisfied Uzana fled soon after only to be caught by Hanthawaddy troops. At Pegu (Bago), Ran forgave Uzana, and made Uzana governor of the Kawliya region near Pegu. Later, Ran added a few more village tracts in Tharrawaddy to Uzana's portfolio. (Note: Maha Yazawin and Hmannan narratives are ambiguous.: In one section, Ran gave Uzana a few villages in the Kawliya district in fief before appointing him at Tharrawaddy in 1436.; In another section, Anawrahta was still governor of Paungde and Tharrawaddy in 1446.; The Toungoo Yazawin says Uzana was given the villages of Kyaukmaw, Thanzeik, Katkyaygyaung, Pyakathaung, and Taung-wa-nwe-zeik.)

== Bibliography ==
- Kala, U (2006) [1724]. Maha Yazawin (in Burmese). Vol. 1–3 (4th printing ed.). Yangon: Ya-Pyei Publishing.
- Royal Historical Commission of Burma (2003) [1832]. Hmannan Yazawin (in Burmese). Vol. 1–3. Yangon: Ministry of Information, Myanmar.
- Sein Lwin Lay, Kahtika U (2006) [1968]. Min Taya Shwe Hti and Bayinnaung: Ketumadi Taungoo Yazawin (in Burmese) (2nd printing ed.). Yangon: Yan Aung Sarpay.

Uzana of Toungoo Ava
Royal titles
Preceded by ?	Governor of Tharrawaddy c. 1437 – ?	Succeeded by Anawraha Saw
Regnal titles
Preceded by Thinkhaya III	King of Toungoo; 1435 – 1436	Succeeded by Tarabya as Viceroy
