= Htauk Hlayga of Toungoo =

Htauk Hlayga ထောက်လှေကား

Governor of Toungoo
- In office 1344–1347
- Monarch: Kyawswa I of Pinya
- Preceded by: Letya Sekkya
- Succeeded by: Theingaba

Personal details
- Died: c. January 1347 c. late 708 ME Toungoo (Taungoo); Pinya Kingdom

Htauk Hlayga (Burmese: ထောက်လှေကား, pronounced [taʊ̯ʔ l̥ègá]) was governor of Toungoo (Taungoo) from 1344 to 1347. Prior to becoming governor, he had been a longtime minister, serving at the regional court of Toungoo at least since the 1310s. In 1317−18, Hlayga and his elder brother Letya Sekkya negotiated with the forces of Pinya for an agreement that allowed the rebellious governor Thawun Nge to remain in office in exchange for the latter's nominal submission. He became governor by assassinating his brother in 1344 shortly after King Kyawswa I assumed power in Toungoo's overlord Pinya. He apparently negotiated a deal with Kyawswa to let him in power, but he was assassinated a year and nine months later by another minister, Theingaba.

== Bibliography ==
- Maha Sithu (2012) [1798]. Kyaw Win; Thein Hlaing (eds.). Yazawin Thit (in Burmese). Vol. 1–3 (2nd printing ed.). Yangon: Ya-Pyei Publishing.
- Sein Lwin Lay, Kahtika U (2006) [1968]. Mintaya Shwe Hti and Bayinnaung: Ketumadi Taungoo Yazawin (in Burmese) (2nd printing ed.). Yangon: Yan Aung Sarpay.

Htauk Hlayga of Toungoo Pinya Kingdom Died: c. January 1347
Royal titles
Preceded by Letya Sekkya	Governor of Toungoo; 1344 – 1347	Succeeded by Theingaba
