= List of rulers of Toungoo =

This is a list of rulers of Taungoo, the predecessor principality of the Taungoo Dynasty of what is now Myanmar. The principality of Taungoo, at the edge of the realm of Upper Burma-based kingdoms, was a rebellion-prone vassal state. The region was ruled by hereditary viceroys as well as appointed governors, depending on the power of the high king at Pinya, and later Inwa (Ava). Many of the rulers of Taungoo were assassinated while in office, and a few others died in action, showing the frontier nature of the region. The high kings at Ava at times had only nominal control or no control in many stretches. After 1612, the office of viceroy at Taungoo became a mere appointed governorship as the Restored Taungoo kings abolished then existing hereditary viceroyships throughout the entire Irrawaddy valley.

== Origins ==
The first recorded administration of the Taungoo region came in 1191 when King Sithu II appointed Ananda Thuriya, a son-in-law of his, to be governor of Kanba Myint (ကမ်းပါးမြင့်), a settlement on the Swa stream, a tributary of the Paunglaung, about 40 km north of present-day Taungoo. The first governor was succeeded by his son, Min Hla Saw, who in turn was succeeded by his son, Thawun Letya. According to the chronicle Toungoo Yazawin, Thawun Gyi and Thawun Nge, the two sons of Thawun Letya founded a new settlement near the present-day city of Taungoo, about 40 km south of Kanba Myint, in 1279. It was named Taungoo (တောင်ငူ, "Hill's Spur") because of its location by the hills.

Name	Term From	Term Until	Relationship to predecessor(s)
Ananda Thuriya	1191	c. late 1220s	Appointed
Min Hla Saw	c. late 1220s	1250s	Son
Thawun Letya	1250s	1256	Son
No office holder (1256–79)

== List of rulers ==
Name	Term From	Term Until	Relationship to predecessor(s)	Notes
Thawun Gyi	17 April 1279	c. 23 June 1317	Son of Thawun Letya	Vassal of Pagan (1279–1287); assassinated
Thawun Nge	c. 23 June 1317	1324	Brother	Independent (1317–18); Vassal of Pinya (1318–24)
Saw Hnit	1324	1325	Son	Vassal of Pinya; assassinated
Kayin Ba	1325	c. May 1342	No relations; usurper	Vassal of Pinya
Letya Sekkya	c. May 1342	c. May 1344	Son-in-law	Vassal of Pinya; assassinated
Htauk Hlayga	c. May 1344	c. January 1347	Brother; usurper	Vassal of Pinya; assassinated
Theingaba	c. January 1347	29 March 1367	No relations; usurper	Independent/in rebellion (1358–1367)
Pyanchi I	29 March 1367	c. November 1375	Son	Vassal of Ava; assassinated
Ma Sein	c. November 1375	c. January 1376	Usurper	Vassal of Hanthawaddy Pegu; assassinated
Pyanchi II	c. January 1376	1379	Son of Pyanchi I	Vassal of Ava; assassinated
Sokkate	1379	1383	Brother-in-law	Vassal of Ava; assassinated
Phaungga	1383	1397	Usurper	Vassal of Ava
Saw Oo I	1397	1399	Son	Removed from office
Min Nemi	1399	1408/09	No relations, appointed	
Letya Zeya Thingyan	1408/09	1412	Appointed	Moved to become governor of Pyinzi
Thinkhaya I	1412	1415	Appointed	
Thinkhaya II	1415	1418/19	Son	KIA
Pantaung	1419	1420	Appointed	Interim governor
Thinkhaya III	1420	1435	Appointed	Independent/in rebellion (1426–1435)
Uzana	1435	1436	Son-in-law; Appointed	Independent/in rebellion; Vassal of Hanthawaddy; Removed from office by Binnya Ran I
Saw Oo II	1436	c. February 1441	Son of Thinkhaya III	Independent/in rebellion; killed in action
Tarabya	c. February 1441	2 January 1446	Appointed	Vassal of Ava
Minkhaung I	2 January 1446	c. February 1452	Son	Vassal of Ava; assassinated
Minye Kyawhtin	c. February 1452	c. February 1459	Usurper; son of Crown Prince Minye Kyawswa	Independent/in rebellion (1452–59); assassinated
Thiri Zeya Thura	c. April 1459	1466	Appointed	Removed from office
Letya Zala Thingyan	1466	1470	Appointed	Independent/in revolt (1470); deposed
Sithu Kyawhtin	1470	1481	Appointed	Vassal of Ava; died in action
Min Sithu	1481	c. April 1485	Son	Vassal of Ava; assassinated
Mingyi Nyo	c. April 1485	24 November 1530	Nephew	Declared independence from Ava in 1510
Tabinshwehti	24 November 1530	1540	Son	Moved seat of government to Bago (Pegu) in 1539
Mingyi Swe	1540	March 1549 (Note: (Sein Lwin Lay 2006: 236): He died in year 910 ME after having participated in the 1548–1549 Siamese campaign. Since Tabinshwehti arrived back at Pegu on 1 March 1549 (3rd waxing of Late Tagu 910 ME) per (Sein Lwin Lay 2006: 232), Mingyi Swe died during the remaining weeks of 910 ME, which ended on 29 March 1549.)	Appointed; father of Bayinnaung	
Minkhaung II	March 1549	11 January 1551	Appointed	Independent/in rebellion (1550–51)
Bayinnaung	11 January 1551	12 March 1552	Elder brother	
Minkhaung II	6 June 1552	June 1584	Younger brother; re-appointed	
Minye Thihathu II	June 1584	11 August 1609	Son	Independent/in rebellion (1597–1609)
Natshinnaung	11 August 1609	August 1612	Son; appointed 1610–12	Independent/in rebellion (1609–10)

== See also ==
- List of Burmese monarchs
- List of rulers of Ava
- List of rulers of Martaban
- List of rulers of Pegu
- List of rulers of Prome

== Bibliography ==
- Lieberman, Victor B. (2003). Strange Parallels: Southeast Asia in Global Context, c. 800–1830, volume 1, Integration on the Mainland. Cambridge University Press. ISBN 978-0-521-80496-7.
- Royal Historical Commission of Burma (1829–1832). Hmannan Yazawin (in Burmese). Vol. 1–3 (2003 ed.). Yangon: Ministry of Information (Myanmar).
- Sein Lwin Lay, Kahtika U (2006). Mintaya Shwe Hti and Bayinnaung: Ketumadi Taungoo Yazawin (in Burmese) (2nd printing ed.). Yangon: Yan Aung Sarpay.
- Thaw Kaung, U (2010). Aspects of Myanmar History and Culture. Yangon: Gangaw Myaing.
