= Min Nemi of Toungoo =

Burmese military commander and governor (r. 1399–1408 or 1409)

Min Nemi နေမိ

Governor of Toungoo
- In office 1399–1408/09
- Monarchs: Swa Saw Ke (1399–1400); Minkhaung I (1400–1408/09)
- Preceded by: Saw Oo I
- Succeeded by: Letya Zeya Thingyan

Personal details
- Died: 1408/09; 770 ME Toungoo (Taungoo)

Military service
- Allegiance: Ava Kingdom
- Rank: Commander
- Battles/wars: Forty Years' War

Min Nemi (Burmese: မင်းနေမိ, pronounced [mɪ́ɴ nèmḭ]) was governor of Toungoo (Taungoo) from 1399 to 1408/09. (Note: Standard chronicles Hmannan (Hmannan Vol. 1 2003: 434) and Maha Yazawin (Maha Yazawin Vol. 1 2006: 304) say Swa Saw Ke appointed Min Nemi in 760 ME (29 March 1398 to 28 March 1399). But the Taungoo chronicle Toungoo Yazawin (Sein Lwin Lay 2006: 25–26) says Nemi assumed office in 761 ME (29 March 1399 to 27 March 1400). It appears that Min Nemi's appointment occurred in late 760 ME (January to March 1399) and Min Nemi arrived at the city in early 761 ME (March to April 1399).) He was also a military commander, whose regional army consisted of 60 war elephants, and fought in the Forty Years' War. He ruled for nearly ten years.

== Bibliography ==
- Kala, U (1724). Maha Yazawin (in Burmese). Vol. 1–3 (2006, 4th printing ed.). Yangon: Ya-Pyei Publishing.
- Royal Historical Commission of Burma (1832). Hmannan Yazawin (in Burmese). Vol. 1–3 (2003 ed.). Yangon: Ministry of Information, Myanmar.
- Sein Lwin Lay, Kahtika U (1968). Min Taya Shwe Hti and Bayinnaung: Ketumadi Taungoo Yazawin (in Burmese) (2006, 2nd printing ed.). Yangon: Yan Aung Sarpay.

Min Nemi of Toungoo Ava Kingdom
Royal titles
Preceded by Saw Oo I as viceroy	Governor of Toungoo; 1399 – 1408/09	Succeeded by Letya Zeya Thingyan
