= Saw Hnit of Toungoo =

Saw Hnit စောနှစ်

Governor of Toungoo
- Reign: 1324 – 1325
- Predecessor: Thawun Nge
- Successor: Kayin Ba
- Regent: Saw Sala
- Born: c. 1310s Toungoo (Taungoo); Pinya Kingdom
- Died: 1325; Toungoo; Pinya Kingdom
- Father: Thawun Nge
- Mother: Saw Sala
- Religion: Theravada Buddhism

Saw Hnit (Burmese: စောနှစ်, pronounced [sɔ́ n̥ɪʔ]; 1310s–1325) was governor of Toungoo from 1324 to 1325. He inherited the office after his father Thawun Nge's death in 1324. Because he was still a young adult, his mother Saw Sala ruled the Toungoo region, then a vassal state of Pinya. He was killed a year later during a coup organized by Chief Minister Kayin Ba, who had served under Toungoo rulers since 1279. Saw Sala escaped but died on the run near Taungdwingyi.

== Bibliography ==
- Sein Lwin Lay, Kahtika U (2006) [1968]. Min Taya Shwe Hti and Bayinnaung: Ketumadi Taungoo Yazawin (in Burmese) (2nd printing ed.). Yangon: Yan Aung Sarpay.

Saw Hnit of Toungoo Pinya Kingdom Born: c. 1310s Died: 1325
Royal titles
Preceded by Thawun Nge	Governor of Toungoo; 1324 – 1325	Succeeded by Kayin Ba
