= Tarabya of Toungoo =

Tarabya of Toungoo တောင်ငူ တရဖျား

Viceroy of Toungoo
- Reign: c. April 1440 – 2 January 1446
- Predecessor: Saw Oo II
- Successor: Minkhaung I
- Monarch: Minye Kyawswa I

Governor of Yanaung
- Reign: c. May 1439 – c. April 1440
- Monarch: Minye Kyawswa I

Governor of Amyint
- Reign: c. February 1434 – c. May 1439
- Monarch: Mohnyin Thado (1434−39); Minye Kyawswa I (1439)
- Born: c. 1390s
- Died: 2 January 1446; 6th waxing of Tabodwe 807 ME (Note: (Sein Lwin Lay 2006: 31): He died at the midnight of 5th waxing of Tabodwe 807 ME (1 January 1446), which means the day had already turned over to 2 January 1446. Note that the traditional Burmese astronomical day runs from midnight to midnight but the traditional civil day runs from sunrise to sunrise. Thus, from a civil day standpoint, it was still 5th waxing of Tabodwe 807 ME, even at or past midnight before sunrise.); Toungoo (Taungoo)
- Issue: Minkhaung I
- Father: Tarabya I of Pakhan
- Religion: Theravada Buddhism

Tarabya of Toungoo (Burmese: တောင်ငူ တရဖျား, pronounced [tàʊɴŋù təɹəbjá]) was viceroy of Toungoo from 1440 to 1446. Prior to Toungoo, he had held governorships at Amyint and Yanaung.

== Brief ==
He was a son of Gov. Tarabya I of Pakhan, and younger brother of Queen Saw Min Hla. He was appointed governor of Amyint with the title of Tarabya in early 1434 by King Mohnyin Thado. (Note: (Hmannan Vol. 2 2003: 69–70): The king made the appointment after a series of failed campaigns to Pinle, Yamethin and Taungdwin; the campaigns began in the dry season of 1433–34, and took 3 months. It means the appointment was made c. February 1434.) In 1439, King Minye Kyawswa I succeeded the Ava throne, and appointed Tarabya governor of the strategic town of Yanaung in the Prome region as a step to regain Toungoo which had been in revolt since 1426.

In 1440, (Note: (Sein Lwin Lay 2006: 30): Toungoo surrendered in 802 ME (30 March 1440 to 29 March 1441), after which Tarabya was appointed governor. Since (Sein Lwin Lay 2006: 31) also says Tarabya ruled for about six years before his death in January 1446, Tarabya may have become governor in early 802 ME (c. April 1440).) Tarabya partook in the Ava expedition to Toungoo that retook the region. For his success, Tarabya was appointed viceroy of Toungoo.

According to the Toungoo Yazawin chronicle, a court astrologer predicted in 1442 that the viceroy would die at midnight on 5th waxing of Tabodwe 807 ME (1 January 1446). Angered by the prediction, he sent the astrologer to jail. The chronicle continues that the viceroy died at the midnight of 1 January 1446 as he was taking a shower. His son Minkhaung succeeded, and freed the astrologer from jail.

Tarabya ruled for nearly six years. Tarabya was a brother-in-law of Crown Prince Minye Kyawswa of the Forty Years' War fame. Moreover, starting with the Maha Yazawin chronicle, all royal chronicles identify Tarabya of Toungoo as an ancestor (paternal great-great-great grandfather) of King Bayinnaung of Toungoo Dynasty.

== Bibliography ==
- Kala, U (2006) [1724]. Maha Yazawin (in Burmese). Vol. 1–3 (4th printing ed.). Yangon: Ya-Pyei Publishing.
- Sein Lwin Lay, Kahtika U (2006) [1968]. Mintaya Shwe Hti and Bayinnaung: Ketumadi Taungoo Yazawin (in Burmese) (2nd printing ed.). Yangon: Yan Aung Sarpay.
- Thaw Kaung, U (2010). Aspects of Myanmar History and Culture. Yangon: Gangaw Myaing.

Tarabya of Toungoo Toungoo Dynasty Born: c. 1390s Died: 2 January 1446
Royal titles
| Preceded by Saw Oo II | Viceroy of Toungoo c. April 1440 – 2 January 1446 | Succeeded by Minkhaung I |
| Preceded by | Governor of Yanaung c. May 1439 – c. April 1440 | Succeeded by |
| Preceded by | Governor of Amyint c. February 1434 – c. May 1439 | Succeeded by |
