= Letya Zeya Thingyan =

Burmese governor

Letya Zeya Thingyan လက်ျာ ဇေယျ သင်္ကြန်

Governor of Pyinzi
- In office c. April 1412 – May 1426
- Monarch: Minkhaung I
- Preceded by: Nandathingyan
- Succeeded by: Thihapate

Governor of Launggyet
- In office c. February 1411 – early 1412
- Monarch: Minkhaung I
- Preceded by: Min Saw Mon (as king of Launggyet)
- Succeeded by: Min Saw Mon (as king)

Governor of Toungoo
- In office 1408/09–1412
- Monarch: Minkhaung I
- Preceded by: Min Nemi
- Succeeded by: Thinkhaya I

Personal details
- Born: Khin Nyo c. 1350s
- Died: Unknown

Military service
- Allegiance: Ava Kingdom
- Branch/service: Royal Ava Army
- Rank: Commander
- Commands: Launggyet Army

Letya Zeya Thingyan (Burmese: လက်ျာ ဇေယျ သင်္ကြန်, pronounced [lɛʔjà zèja̰ θɪ́ɴdʑàɴ]) was governor of Toungoo (Taungoo) from 1408/09 to 1412.

== Brief ==
Born Khin Nyo, he was a childhood tutor of King Minkhaung I of Ava. Minkhaung appointed him governor of Toungoo in 1408/09 to replace Min Nemi, who had just died.

His appointment came at the height of the Forty Years' War against the Hanthawaddy kingdom. He commanded the Toungoo Regiment in the 1410–1412 campaigns of the war. During the war in early 1411, he was appointed governor of Launggyet, the capital of Arakan. He was driven out of Launggyet a year later by a Hanthawaddy army.

At Ava, Minkhaung moved Letya to Pyinzi because the king was concerned that Letya was getting too old to be governor of Toungoo, a frontier town, during the war. He lost his Pyinzi post in 1426 when the new king Mohnyin Thado appointed his son-in-law Thihapate governor of Pyinzi.

== Bibliography ==
- Kala, U (2006) [1724]. Maha Yazawin (in Burmese). Vol. 1–3 (4th printing ed.). Yangon: Ya-Pyei Publishing.
- Maha Sithu (2012) [1798]. Myint Swe; Kyaw Win; Thein Hlaing (eds.). Yazawin Thit (in Burmese). Vol. 1–3 (2nd printing ed.). Yangon: Ya-Pyei Publishing.
- Pan Hla, Nai (2005) [1968]. Razadarit Ayedawbon (in Burmese) (8th printing ed.). Yangon: Armanthit Sarpay.
- Royal Historical Commission of Burma (2003) [1832]. Hmannan Yazawin (in Burmese). Vol. 1–3. Yangon: Ministry of Information, Myanmar.
- Sein Lwin Lay, Kahtika U (2006) [1968]. Min Taya Shwe Hti and Bayinnaung: Ketumadi Taungoo Yazawin (in Burmese) (2nd printing ed.). Yangon: Yan Aung Sarpay.

Letya Zeya Thingyan Ava Kingdom Born: c. 1350s Died: ?
Royal titles
Preceded by Nandathingyan	Governor of Pyinzi; 1412 – 1426	Succeeded by Thihapate
Preceded by Min Nemi	Governor of Toungoo; 1408/09 – 1412	Succeeded by Thinkhaya I
