= Ananda Thuriya of Kanba Myint =

Ananda Thuriya အနန္တ သူရိယ

Governor of Kanba Myint
- Reign: 1191 – c. late 1220s
- Predecessor: New office
- Successor: Min Hla Saw
- Born: c. 1160
- Died: in or after 1224; Kanba Myint
- Spouse: Saw Min Hla
- Issue: Min Hla Saw
- Religion: Theravada Buddhism

Ananda Thuriya (Burmese: အနန္တ သူရိယ, pronounced [ʔənàɴda̰ θùɹḭja̰]) was the first governor of Kanba Myint, the region that would later become the Principality of Toungoo (Taungoo), the predecessor state of the Toungoo dynasty. The governor started out his career in the military service of King Sithu II of Pagan (Bagan), rising to commander-in-chief of the royal army. He later became a chief minister at the royal court, and married a daughter of the king. In 1191, he was appointed governor of Kanba Myint, (modern Taungoo District), then a frontier region. He was the paternal great grandfather of Thawun Gyi and Thawun Nge, who founded Toungoo in 1279.

== Brief ==
The royal chronicles say nothing about his early life except for his personal name, Yanman Nga Htwe (ရန်မန် ငထွေး). Based on his honorific, Yanman, he was likely an ethnic Mon. (Note: "Yanman" is a modern-day Burmese pronunciation of Rmen, which per (Aung-Thwin 2005: 46) was the Pagan period Old Mon name for the Mon people. "Nga" is the diminutive term used by the royals when addressing to those of lower status. The name Yaman Nga Htwe means "Commoner Htwe the Mon".) The first mention of him the chronicles is as a member of the security detail of King Sithu II (r. 1174–1211). Chronicles say that Htwe made his name one day when the king was sailing upriver from Pagan (Bagan), and the royal barge was attacked by a large crocodile. Htwe jumped into the river, and wrestled the crocodile and killed it with the royal sceptre.

The grateful king appointed him an officer in his army. There, Htwe served with distinction. He started out leading small expeditions to put down minor rebellions, and later became a commander leading major expeditions to more remote regions. (Note: All his expeditions reported in the chronicles were to put down the rebellions. He did not appear to have participated in Sithu's earlier expeditions that expanded the Pagan Empire to its greatest extent per (Lieberman 2003: 90–94).) Chronicles say that he proved to be a successful commander, and usually brought home the rebel leader. Legends grew about his bravery: He supposedly wrestled and killed a tiger, and an elephant on separate occasions. For his battlefield successes, the king rewarded him by granting a senior court title, Ananda Thuriya (Pali: Ananta Suriya), (Note: (Harvey 1925: 58) considers him chief minister of Sithu II.) and his teenage daughter Saw Min Hla in marriage. (Note: According to the chronicles, (Maha Yazawin Vol. 1 2006: 220) and (Hmannan Vol. 1 2003: 328), the royal daughter was the younger sister of Zeya Theinkha, then governor of Nyaungyan and later King Htilominlo (r. 1211–35). (Than Tun 1964: 129): Per a contemporary inscription, the name of Zeya Theinkha's only sister was A-Saw Min Hla, (or Saw Min Hla in modern Burmese), daughter of Queen Saw Mya Kan. However, the editors of (Maha Yazawin Vol. 1 2006: 219) note that another source, Sway-daw-zin Hmattan, states that Ananda Thuriya married Kyaung-Daw-The, daughter of junior queen Saw Sanay. If she was in fact Saw Min Hla, she was not older than 16. Since Saw Min Hla's elder brother Htilominlo was born in February 1175 per (Zata 1960: 40), she was most likely born in late 1175 at the earliest. Per the Toungoo Yazawin chronicle, she and Ananda Thuriya were already married by 1191 when the couple was sent off to Kanba Myint.) The minister-general built the Laymyethna Temple in Pagan, inscribing a curse on all those who should injure his dedication.

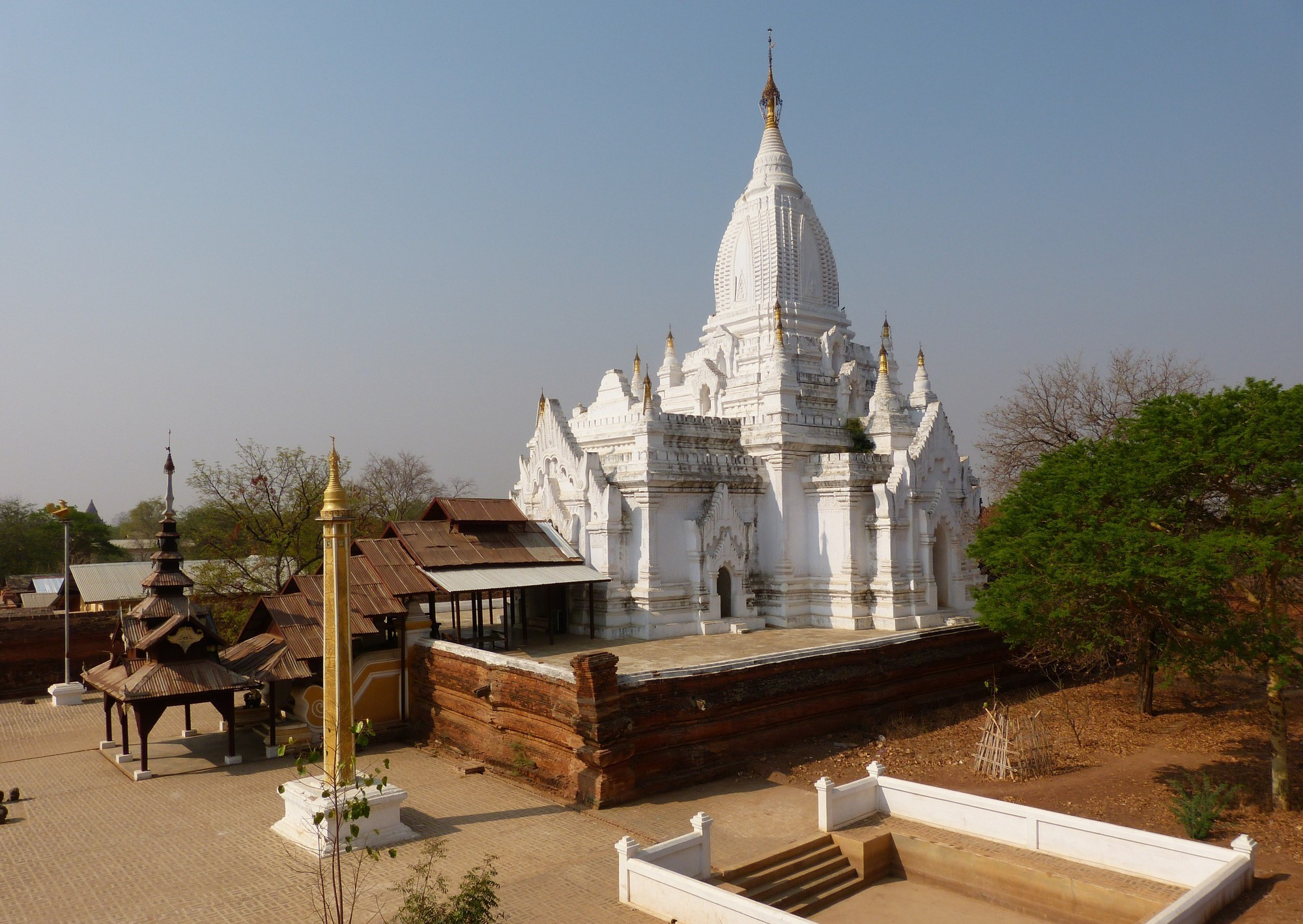
Lemyethna Temple in Bagan, donated by Ananda Thuriya and his wife in 1223

According to the Toungoo region's chronicle Toungoo Yazawin, in 1191, Ananda Thuriya was given in fief a frontier region called Kanba Myint (ကမ်းပါးမြင့်), a small settlement on the Swa, a tributary to the Paunglaung river. The king made the appointment while travelling through the region on his return trip from Pegu (Bago) in the south. He observed that the hitherto frontier region, about 250 km from the Mon-speaking Pegu, was now populated with Mon and Burmese speakers, and decided to closely administer the region. According to historian Sein Lwin Lay, the king likely considered his son-in-law Ananda Thuriya, a proven military commander and probably an ethnic Mon (based on his name), a perfect fit for the region.

Except for a couple of pagoda renovations, not much is known about his years as governor at Kanba Myint. He died in an unknown year, and was succeeded by his son Min Hla Saw. In 1279, two of his great grandsons Thawun Gyi and Thawun Nge founded Toungoo (Taungoo), about 40 km south of Kanba Myint. Toungoo became the principal city of the region by the early 14th century.

== Bibliography ==
- Aung-Thwin, Michael (2005). The Mists of Rāmañña: The Legend that was Lower Burma (illustrated ed.). Honolulu: University of Hawai'i Press. ISBN 978-0-8248-2886-8.
- Harvey, G. E. (1925). History of Burma: From the Earliest Times to 10 March 1824. London: Frank Cass & Co. Ltd.
- Kala, U (1724). Maha Yazawin (in Burmese). Vol. 1–3 (2006, 4th printing ed.). Yangon: Ya-Pyei Publishing.
- Lieberman, Victor B. (1984). Burmese Administrative Cycles: Anarchy and Conquest, c. 1580–1760. Princeton University Press. ISBN 0-691-05407-X.
- Royal Historians of Burma (c. 1680). U Hla Tin (Hla Thamein) (ed.). Zatadawbon Yazawin (1960 ed.). Historical Research Directorate of the Union of Burma.
- Royal Historical Commission of Burma (1832). Hmannan Yazawin (in Burmese). Vol. 1–3 (2003 ed.). Yangon: Ministry of Information, Myanmar.
- Sein Lwin Lay, Kahtika U (1968). Min Taya Shwe Hti and Bayinnaung: Ketumadi Taungoo Yazawin (in Burmese) (2006, 2nd printing ed.). Yangon: Yan Aung Sarpay.
- Than Tun (1964). Studies in Burmese History (in Burmese). Vol. 1. Yangon: Maha Dagon.

Ananda Thuriya of Kanba Myint Pagan Dynasty
Royal titles
New title	Governor of Kanba Myint; 1191 – ?	Succeeded by Min Hla Saw
