= Lemyethna Temple =

Buddhist pagoda in Bagan, Myanmar

Coordinates: 21°09′37″N 94°54′06.3″E

- Burmese: လေးမျက်နှာ ဂူဘုရား
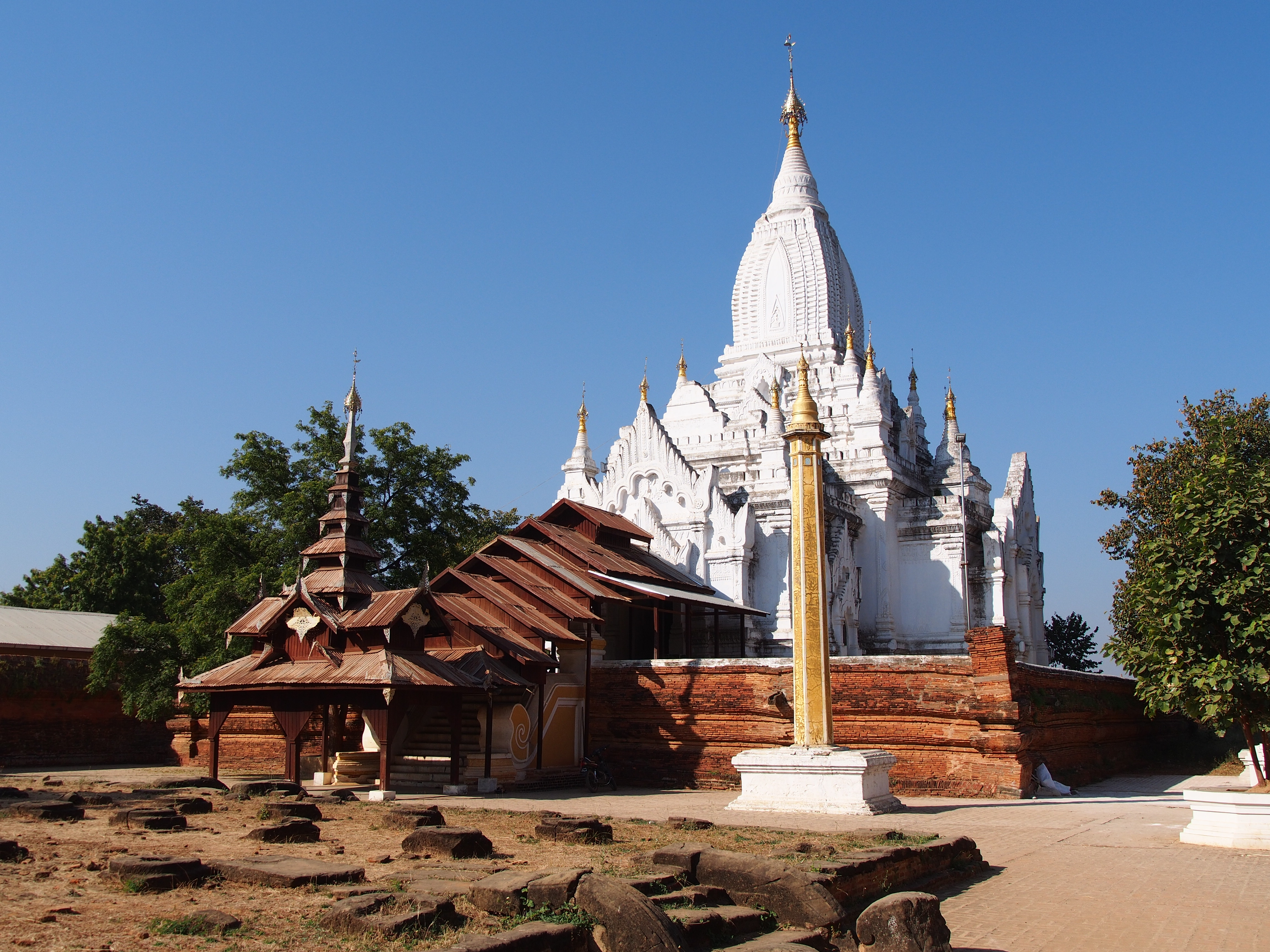

Religion
- Affiliation: Buddhism
- Status: Open

Location
- Location: Bagan, Myanmar
- Country: Myanmar
- Interactive map of Lemyethna Temple

Architecture
- Founder: Ananda Thuriya
- Completed: 1222

Lemyethna Temple (Burmese:လေးမျက်နှာ ဂူဘုရား), also known as Lemyethna Pagoda or the Temple of the Four Faces, is a 13th-century Buddhist temple in Bagan, Myanmar. Built in 1222 by the Pagan Empire, the temple remains in regular use.

== Description ==
Lemyethna temple was built in 1222 or 1223 in Bagan, near the village of Min Nanthu. Archaeological evidence suggests that the temple was built on top of a foundation erected by the Pyu civilization, which had ruled Bagan before the formation of the Pagan Empire. The temple was sponsored by Ananda Thuriya, a minister of King Htilominlo, who was himself a prolific builder of temples. The building was one of the last temples built by the Pagan dynasty of Myanmar, which went into decline after Htilominlo's death.

At the time of the temple's dedication, it housed a number of Buddhist relics and contained murals depicting Buddhist scenes. Ananda Thuriya also inscribed prayers on the temple. The structure is a single story tall, and is surrounded by four porches. The temple also has a large central stupa.

The temple's condition declined over the centuries, and frequent whitewashing of the temple damaged some of the original murals. The government of Myanmar repaired parts of the temple in 1961, and the temple remains in regular use.
