= Letya Sekkya of Toungoo =

Governor of Toungoo from 1342 to 1344

Letya Sekkya လက်ျာ စကြာ

Governor of Toungoo
- In office 1342–1344
- Monarchs: Sithu of Pinya (1342−44); Kyawswa I of Pinya (1344)
- Preceded by: Kayin Ba
- Succeeded by: Htauk Hlayga

Personal details
- Died: c. May 1344 c. early 706 ME Toungoo (Taungoo); Pinya Kingdom
- Spouse: Daughter of Kayin Ba

Letya Sekkya (Burmese: လက်ျာ စကြာ, pronounced [lɛʔjà sɛʔkjà]) was governor of Toungoo (Taungoo) from 1342 to 1344. He became governor with the title of Zeya Thingyan (ဇေယျ သင်္ကြန်) after the death of his father-in-law Kayin Ba, who left no male heirs. Prior to becoming governor, he had been a longtime minister serving at the regional court of Toungoo at least since the 1310s. In 1317−18, Sekkya led the negotiations with the forces of Pinya that allowed the rebellious governor Thawun Nge to remain in office in exchange for the latter's nominal submission. He was assassinated in 1344 by his younger brother Htauk Hlayga.

== Bibliography ==
- Maha Sithu (2012) [1798]. Kyaw Win; Thein Hlaing (eds.). Yazawin Thit (in Burmese). Vol. 1–3 (2nd printing ed.). Yangon: Ya-Pyei Publishing.
- Sein Lwin Lay, Kahtika U (2006) [1968]. Mintaya Shwe Hti and Bayinnaung: Ketumadi Taungoo Yazawin (in Burmese) (2nd printing ed.). Yangon: Yan Aung Sarpay.

Letya Sekkya of Toungoo Pinya Kingdom Died: c. May 1344
Royal titles
Preceded by Kayin Ba	Governor of Toungoo; 1342 – 1344	Succeeded by Htauk Hlayga
