= Thinkhaya III of Toungoo =

Saw Lu Thinkhaya; စောလူး သင်္ခယာ

King of Toungoo
- Reign: 1426–1435
- Predecessor: himself ((as governor)
- Successor: Uzana
- Minister: Myat Hla

Governor of Toungoo
- Reign: 1420–1426
- Predecessor: Pantaung
- Successor: himself (as king)
- Monarch: Minkhaung I (1420–1421); Thihathu (1421–1425); Min Hla (1425); Min Nyo (1425–1426)
- Born: 1370s: Mindon?; Ava Kingdom
- Died: 1435; Toungoo (Taungoo)
- Issue: unnamed daughter; Saw Min Aung; Saw Oo
- Father: Letwe U-Shaung-Lwe of Mindon (Note: His father's name—title of a court minister—is spelled differently in various chronicles: Yazawin Thit (Yazawin Thit Vol. 1 2012: 336): လက်ဝဲ ဦးသျှောင်ဆွဲ (Letwe U-Shaung-Hswe); Hmannan Yazawin (Hmannan Vol. 2 2003: 165): လက်ဝဲ ဦးသျှောင်လွဲ (Letwe U-Shaung-Lwe); Toungoo Yazawin (Sein Lwin Lay 2006: 27): လက်ဝဲ ဥသျှောင်လွှဲ (Letwe U-Shaung-Hlwe))
- Religion: Theravada Buddhism

Saw Lu Thinkhaya (Burmese: စောလူး သင်္ခယာ, pronounced [sɔ́ lú θɪ̀ɴkʰəjà]; c. 1370s–1435) was the ruler of Toungoo from 1420 to 1435. He was first appointed governor of the frontier vassal state by King Minkhaung I of Ava in 1420. Following the succession crises at Ava, Thinkhaya declared independence in 1426. He seized up to Yamethin in 1428–1429, and in an alliance with King Binnya Ran I of Hanthawaddy Pegu attempted to capture Prome (Pyay) in 1430–1431. But after Ava and Pegu separately reached a truce, Thinkhaya retreated to his home region, and may have lost control of the Yamethin region by 1434. Less than a year after his death in 1435, Toungoo became a vassal of Hanthawaddy.

== Background ==
He was born Saw Lu, son of Governor Letwe U-Shaung-Lwe of Mindon. He was likely born in the 1370s. (Note: Since Thinkhaya called Mohnyin Thado "younger brother" per (Sein Lwin Lay 2006: 28), he was older than but of the same generation as Thado who was born in 1379.) He had at least one younger brother, Governor Anawrahta of Paungde and Tharrawaddy.

== Governor of Toungoo ==
In 1420, King Minkhaung I of Ava (Inwa) appointed him governor of Toungoo (Taungoo), with the title of Thinkhaya. The king had been looking for a loyal and able governor for the restive region bordering the Hanthawaddy kingdom (Pegu) with which Ava had been in a long drawn out war since 1385. At Toungoo, the new governor quickly brought law and order to the lawless region, with the help of his right-hand man Myat Hla, whom he appointed the chief magistrate of the region. He also patronized the Buddhist clergy, appointing the abbot of the Maha Wun monastery to be the chief abbot of the region. Four years into his term, Thinkhaya had completely turned around the region, bringing a degree of peace and prosperity.

Thinkhaya power grew further in 1425 when Ava entered a series of succession crises. That year, Queen Shin Bo-Me engineered the assassinations of kings Thihathu and Min Hla within three months of each other, and placed her lover Gov. Min Nyo of Kale on the throne in November 1425. The takeover was contested by Gov. Thado of Mohnyin who marched to Ava in February 1426. Initially, Thinkhaya, along with the rulers of other southern vassal states, agreed to support the new king at Ava. They even went to the Ava region to defend against the Mohnyin forces. But when the tide of war turned in favor of Mohnyin, Thinkhaya and other rulers retreated to their respective regions, taking their troops back with them. Ava defenses soon collapsed, and the Mohnyin forces entered the capital. Thado proclaimed himself king on 16 May 1426.

== King of Toungoo ==
=== Break from Ava ===
At first, Thinkhaya was unsure of the new king. When Thado ordered the southern vassal rulers to Ava, he reluctantly went there, bringing a small retinue led by Myat Hla. At Ava, Thado tried to woo the vassal rulers for their support. Thinkhaya pledged support to the king but he and Myat Hla also assessed that Thado's army was not strong enough. Several vassal rulers apparently made the same assessment. Rulers of Toungoo, Taungdwin, Thissein, Yenantha, Pinle and Onbaung all revolted soon after they got back to their home region. According to the chronicle Toungoo Yazawin, Thinkhaya sent a formal letter to Thado, addressing the latter as "younger brother", and declaring is independence from Ava as well as his preparedness to go to war, if necessary.

Thinkhaya had an implicit ally in King Binnya Ran I of Hanthawaddy Pegu. Although Ran had signed a peace treaty with King Thihathu of Ava just three years earlier, the Hanthawaddy king decided to support the insurrections. Ran readily gave shelter to Thinkhaya's younger brother, Gov. Anawrahta of Paungde, who defected c. January 1427 (Note: (Hmannan Vol. 2 65): About eight months into Thado's regin, which means January 1427.) after his superior Gov. Min Maha of Prome sided with Thado. Ran seized the southernmost district of Prome, Tharrawaddy, and made Nawrahta governor of Tharrawaddy. Ava could not respond at all as it was facing more serious rebellions closer to home. (Note: (Hmannan Vol. 2 2003: 67): The most serious rebellion was at Pinle, 70 km southeast of Ava. The rebellion was led by Prince Minye Kyawhtin, son of Crown Prince Minye Kyawswa and grandson of King Minkhaung I.)

=== Expansion ===
Taking full advantage of Ava's troubles, Thinkhaya consolidated his power. In 1428–1429, he annexed the five irrigated zones of the Yamethin region immediately to Toungoo's north, and even raided the districts towards the Irrawaddy such as Natmauk and Kyaukpadaung. He next entered into a formal alliance with Pegu by sending his younger daughter Saw Min Aung to Binnya Ran in a marriage of state. The allies eyed Prome, the southernmost region still loyal to Ava. (In response, Thado appointed his son Thihathu governor of Prome, replacing loyal but old Min Maha, in 1429.)

In 1430, Pegu and Toungoo jointly invaded Prome. Thinkhaya himself led a 5000-strong army, while Ran sent an army of equal size led by Smin Bayan, and a 5000-man naval forces led by Binnya Ein. The joint forces defeated the Prome defense forces outside the city. The invasion armies and the Pegu flotilla proceeded to lay siege to the fortified city. Given troubles closer to home, Ava was unwilling to fight a drawn out war in the south, and reluctantly asked for terms. Ava directly negotiated with Pegu as Thado considered Thinkhaya and Nawrahta rebels. Thado was prepared to cede Tharrawaddy to Pegu but wanted Nawrahta (now governor of Tharrawaddy) returned. After a long drawn out negotiation which came to near collapse a few times, (Note: (Hmannan Vol. 2 2003: 72) and (Harvey 1925: 98): Thado was initially so angry at Pegu's terms that he kept Pegu's envoys waiting for three months without audience.) Ava and Pegu reached an agreement that ceded Tharrawaddy to Pegu. Thado also sent Princess Soe Min Wimala Dewi to Pegu to wed Ran in a marriage of state.

=== Last years ===
The Ava-Pegu treaty effectively scuttled Thinkhaya's expansion plans. He had to evacuate the Prome territory after the agreement was signed. It is unclear what Thinkhaya made of the agreement, or what his relationship with Ran continued to be. But without Pegu's explicit support, his position weakened. He appeared to have lost control of the Yamethin region, which by 1433–1434 was controlled by an eastern Shan state.

To be sure, his control over Toungoo remained unchallenged. The peaceful and prosperous region continued to attract refugees from elsewhere. Nonetheless Thinkhaya remained highly concerned about his fiefdom. According to Toungoo Yazawin, when he built a new palace, he refused to install the white umbrella (Hti byu), a key part of the regalia of Burmese sovereigns, perhaps not to attract unwanted attention. History shows that his concerns were not unfounded: Toungoo formally became a vassal of Pegu within the year of his death.

He died in 1435 during a routine hunting trip. When his son-in-law Uzana seized the throne, his only son Saw Oo sought Ran's help. In 1436, Ran came up with an army to Toungoo, and installed Saw Oo as viceroy.

== Bibliography ==
- Harvey, G. E. (1925). History of Burma: From the Earliest Times to 10 March 1824. London: Frank Cass & Co. Ltd.
- Kala, U (2006) [1724]. Maha Yazawin (in Burmese). Vol. 1–3 (4th printing ed.). Yangon: Ya-Pyei Publishing.
- Maha Sithu (2012) [1798]. Myint Swe; Kyaw Win; Thein Hlaing (eds.). Yazawin Thit (in Burmese). Vol. 1–3 (2nd printing ed.). Yangon: Ya-Pyei Publishing.
- Royal Historical Commission of Burma (2003) [1832]. Hmannan Yazawin (in Burmese). Vol. 1–3. Yangon: Ministry of Information, Myanmar.
- Sein Lwin Lay, Kahtika U (2006) [1968]. Min Taya Shwe Hti and Bayinnaung: Ketumadi Taungoo Yazawin (in Burmese) (2nd printing ed.). Yangon: Yan Aung Sarpay.

Thinkhaya III of Toungoo Ava Kingdom Born: 1370s Died: 1435
Regnal titles
Preceded by himself as governor	King of Toungoo; 1426–1435	Succeeded by Uzana
Royal titles
Preceded by Pantaung	Governor of Toungoo; 1420–1426	Succeeded by himself as king
