= Pantaung of Toungoo =

Pantaung Min ပန်းတောင်း မင်း

Governor of Toungoo
- In office 1419–1420
- Monarch: Minkhaung I
- Preceded by: Thinkhaya II
- Succeeded by: Thinkhaya III

Governor of Pantaung
- In office ?–1419
- Monarch: Minkhaung I

Pantaung Min (Burmese: ပန်းတောင်း မင်း, pronounced [páɴdáʊ̯ɴ mɪ́ɴ]) was governor of Toungoo (Taungoo) from 1419 to 1420. He was previously governor of Pantaung, south of Prome (Pyay). He took office about a few months after his predecessor Thinkhaya II was killed in a raid by a small army from an eastern Shan state. He appeared to have been an interim governor as his overlord King Minkhaung I of Ava replaced him with Thinkhaya III about a year later. It is unclear if he still remained governor of Pantaung.

== Bibliography ==
- Royal Historical Commission of Burma (2003) [1832]. Hmannan Yazawin (in Burmese). Vol. 1–3. Yangon: Ministry of Information, Myanmar.
- Sein Lwin Lay, Kahtika U (2006) [1968]. Min Taya Shwe Hti and Bayinnaung: Ketumadi Taungoo Yazawin (in Burmese) (2nd printing ed.). Yangon: Yan Aung Sarpay.

Pantaung of Toungoo Ava Kingdom
Royal titles
Preceded by Thinkhaya II as viceroy	Governor of Toungoo; 1419 – 1420	Succeeded by Thinkhaya III as viceroy
