= Sokkate of Toungoo =

Governor of Toungoo from 1379/80 to 1383

Sokkate စုက္ကတေး

Governor of Toungoo
- In office 1379/80–1383
- Monarch: Swa Saw Ke
- Preceded by: Pyanchi II
- Succeeded by: Phaungga

Personal details
- Died: 1383; 745 ME Toungoo (Taungoo)

Sokkate of Toungoo (Burmese: စုက္ကတေး, [soʊʔ kə té]) governor of Toungoo from 1379/80 to 1383. He came to power by assassinating his brother-in-law Pyanchi II. Sokkate proved to be a tyrant, and lost his standing with Toungoo's overlord Ava. In 1383, he was assassinated by an Ava loyalist Phaungga.

== Bibliography ==
- Royal Historical Commission of Burma (2003) [1832]. Hmannan Yazawin (in Burmese). Vol. 1–3. Yangon: Ministry of Information, Myanmar.
- Sein Lwin Lay, Kahtika U (2006) [1968]. Mintaya Shwe Hti and Bayinnaung: Ketumadi Taungoo Yazawin (in Burmese) (2nd printing ed.). Yangon: Yan Aung Sarpay.

Sokkate of Toungoo Ava Kingdom Died: 1383
Royal titles
Preceded by Pyanchi II	Governor of Toungoo; 1379/80 – 1383	Succeeded by Phaungga
