= Thinkhaya II of Toungoo =

Thinkhaya Nge သင်္ခယာ ငယ်

Viceroy of Toungoo
- In office 1415–1418/19
- Monarch: Minkhaung I
- Preceded by: Thinkhaya I
- Succeeded by: Pantaung

Personal details
- Born: Sagu; Ava Kingdom
- Died: 1418/19; 780 ME Toungoo (Taungoo); Ava Kingdom
- Parents: Thinkhaya I (father); Min Shwe Pan? (mother)

Thinkhaya II of Toungoo (Burmese: သင်္ခယာ ငယ်, pronounced [θɪ̀ɴkʰəjà ŋɛ̀]; also Thinkhaya Nge and Sit Kya Thinkhaya) was viceroy of Toungoo (Taungoo) from 1415 to 1418/19. He succeeded his father in 1415 but died just over three years later when an army from an eastern Shan state raided Toungoo (Taungoo). He is also known as "Sit Kya Thinkhaya" (စစ်ကျ သင်္ခယာ, "Thinkhaya who Fell in Action").

== Bibliography ==
- Royal Historical Commission of Burma (2003) [1832]. Hmannan Yazawin (in Burmese). Vol. 1–3. Yangon: Ministry of Information, Myanmar.
- Sein Lwin Lay, Kahtika U (2006) [1968]. Min Taya Shwe Hti and Bayinnaung: Ketumadi Taungoo Yazawin (in Burmese) (2nd printing ed.). Yangon: Yan Aung Sarpay.

Thinkhaya II of Toungoo Ava Kingdom Died: 1418/19
Royal titles
Preceded by Thinkhaya I	Viceroy of Toungoo; 1415 – 1418/19	Succeeded by Pantaung as governor
