= Saw Sala of Toungoo =

Saw Sala စောစလာ

Vicereine of Toungoo
- Tenure: c. 23 June 1317 – 1324
- Born: c. 1290s
- Died: 1325 near Taungdwingyi
- Spouse: Thawun Nge
- Issue: Saw Hnit
- Religion: Theravada Buddhism

Saw Sala (Burmese: စောစလာ, pronounced [sɔ́ səlà]) was the chief consort of Gov. Thawun Nge of Toungoo (Taungoo) from 1317 to 1324. After her husband's death, she became the regent on behalf of her young son Saw Hnit, and ran Toungoo for about a year. Her rule was unpopular, and she and her son were overthrown by Chief Minister Kayin Ba in 1325. She escaped the coup at the governor's palace that killed Saw Hnit, but died on the run near Taungdwingyi.

== Bibliography ==
- Sein Lwin Lay, Kahtika U (2006) [1968]. Min Taya Shwe Hti and Bayinnaung: Ketumadi Taungoo Yazawin (in Burmese) (2nd printing ed.). Yangon: Yan Aung Sarpay.

Saw Sala of Toungoo Pinya Kingdom Born: c. 1290s
Royal titles
Preceded by	Vicereine of Toungoo c. 23 June 1317 – 1324	Succeeded by
