= Saw Oo II of Toungoo =

Saw Oo II; ဒုတိယ မင်းစောဦး

King of Toungoo
- Reign: 1436 – early 1441
- Predecessor: Uzana (as King)
- Successor: Tarabya
- Monarch: Binnya Ran I

Governor of Yanaung
- Reign: 1420 – 1426
- Born: c. 1390s Mindon?
- Died: c. early 1441; Toungoo (Taungoo)
- Father: Saw Lu
- Religion: Theravada Buddhism

Min Saw Oo II (Burmese: ဒုတိယ မင်းစောဦး, pronounced [dṵtḭja̰ mɪ́ɴ sɔ́ ʔú]) was the vassal king of Toungoo from 1436 to 1441. He was installed on the throne by King Binnya Ran I of Hanthawaddy. Saw Oo died in action in 1441 while defending Toungoo against Ava forces.

== Biography ==
Saw Oo's grandfather served as the governor of Mindon. His father Saw Lu would later become governor of Toungoo (Taungoo), a major vassal state. Saw Oo had two sisters.

Saw Oo's career began in 1420. King Minkhaung I of Ava appointed his father as governor of Toungoo, and Saw Oo as governor of Yanaung, a small town in central Burma. In 1426, he sided with his father, now styled as Thinkhaya, who refused to submit to the new king of Ava, Mohnyin Thado. Thinkhaya declared himself king, and launched a rebellion backed by the Hanthawaddy kingdom. Thinkhaya seized the five irrigated districts of the Yamethin region, located directly north of Toungoo.

Chronicles do not specify Saw Oo's exact role during Thinkhaya's reign. When Thinkhaya died in 1435/36, although Saw Oo was the only son, his brother-in-law Uzana succeeded the Toungoo throne. Saw Oo appealed to the other brother-in-law, King Binnya Ran I of Hanthawaddy, to intervene. Less than a year after Uzana's accession, Ran arrived with an army, and installed Saw Oo as king.

Saw Oo's reign as vassal king lasted about four years. During the dry season of 1440–1441, Ava forces attacked Toungoo. Saw Oo attempted to break the siege by personally leading the Toungoo forces on his war elephant. In the ensuing pitched battle, he was killed by the Ava Commander Yazathingyan. Tarabya was subsequently appointed governor.

== Bibliography ==
- Kala, U (2006) [1724]. Maha Yazawin (in Burmese). Vol. 1–3 (4th printing ed.). Yangon: Ya-Pyei Publishing.
- Maha Sithu (2012) [1798]. Myint Swe; Kyaw Win; Thein Hlaing (eds.). Yazawin Thit (in Burmese). Vol. 1–3 (2nd printing ed.). Yangon: Ya-Pyei Publishing.
- Royal Historical Commission of Burma (2003) [1832]. Hmannan Yazawin (in Burmese). Vol. 1–3. Yangon: Ministry of Information, Myanmar.
- Sein Lwin Lay, Kahtika U (2006) [1968]. Min Taya Shwe Hti and Bayinnaung: Ketumadi Taungoo Yazawin (in Burmese) (2nd printing ed.). Yangon: Yan Aung Sarpay.

Saw Oo II of Toungoo Hanthawaddy kingdom Born: c. 1390s Died: early 1441
Royal titles
Preceded by Uzana	King of Toungoo; 1436 – early 1441	Succeeded by Tarabya as Governor
Preceded by	Governor of Yanaung; 1420 – 1426	Succeeded by
