= Thinkhaya I of Toungoo =

Thinkhaya သင်္ခယာ

Viceroy of Toungoo
- In office 1412–1415
- Monarch: Minkhaung I
- Preceded by: Letya Zeya Thingyan
- Succeeded by: Thinkhaya II

Governor of Sagu
- In office after 1402 – 1412
- Monarch: Minkhaung I
- Preceded by: Theinkhathu II
- Succeeded by: Khin Ba

Personal details
- Died: 1415; 777 ME
- Spouse: Min Shwe Pan
- Children: Thinkhaya II; Saw Myo Ke

Thinkhaya I of Toungoo (Burmese: သင်္ခယာ, pronounced [θɪ̀ɴkʰəjà]) was viceroy of Toungoo (Taungoo) from 1412 to 1415.

== Brief ==
Prior to the appointment at Toungoo by King Minkhaung I of Ava, Thinkhaya was governor of Sagu. His title at Sagu was Thiri Zeya Kyawhtin, and he was already governor by 1408. Chronicles do not say when he was appointed to the Sagu post but the previous governor of Sagu, Theinkhathu II, was still alive in 1402.

He died in 1415, and was succeeded by his son Thinkhaya II. He was married to Min Shwe Pan, a granddaughter of King Swa Saw Ke of Ava and great granddaughter of King Kyawswa I of Pinya.

== Bibliography ==
- Kala, U (2006) [1724]. Maha Yazawin (in Burmese). Vol. 1–3 (4th printing ed.). Yangon: Ya-Pyei Publishing.
- Maha Sithu (2012) [1798]. Myint Swe; Kyaw Win; Thein Hlaing (eds.). Yazawin Thit (in Burmese). Vol. 1–3 (2nd printing ed.). Yangon: Ya-Pyei Publishing.
- Royal Historical Commission of Burma (2003) [1832]. Hmannan Yazawin (in Burmese). Vol. 1–3. Yangon: Ministry of Information, Myanmar.
- Sein Lwin Lay, Kahtika U (2006) [1968]. Min Taya Shwe Hti and Bayinnaung: Ketumadi Taungoo Yazawin (in Burmese) (2nd printing ed.). Yangon: Yan Aung Sarpay.

Thinkhaya I of Toungoo Ava Kingdom Died: 1415
Royal titles
Preceded by Letya Zeya Thingyan as governor	Viceroy of Toungoo; 1412 – 1415	Succeeded by Thinkhaya II
Preceded by Theinkhathu II	Governor of Sagu after 1402 – 1412	Succeeded by Khin Ba
