= Paungde Township =

Township in Bago Region, Myanmar

Coordinates: 18°29′29″N 95°30′26″E

Paungde Township ပေါင်းတည်မြို့နယ်
- Township
- Location in Pyay District
- Country: Myanmar
- Region: Bago Region
- District: Nattalin District
- Capital: Paungde
- Time zone: UTC+6.30 (MMT)

Paungde Township (Burmese: ပေါင်းတည်မြို့နယ်) is a township in Nattalin District in the Bago Region of Myanmar. The principal town is Paungde.
