= Thawun Nge =

Thawun Nge သဝန်ငယ်

Governor of Toungoo
- Reign: c. 23 June 1317 – 1324
- Predecessor: Thawun Gyi
- Successor: Saw Hnit
- Born: c. 1260; Pyu (Phyu); Pagan Empire
- Died: 1324 (aged 63–64); Toungoo (Taungoo); Pinya Kingdom
- Spouse: Saw Sala; Saw Omma
- Issue: Saw Hnit
- Father: Thawun Letya
- Religion: Theravada Buddhism

Thawun Nge (Burmese: သဝန်ငယ်, pronounced [θəwʊ̀ɴ ŋɛ̀]; c. 1260 – 1324) was governor of Toungoo (Taungoo) from 1317 to 1324. He came to office by assassinating his elder brother Thawun Gyi while Toungoo's overlord Pinya was facing a serious rebellion at Sagaing. His own rebellion was brief as he struck a deal with Pinya to keep the office in exchange for his submission. He died in 1324, and was succeeded by his son Saw Hnit.

== Early life ==
Thawun Nge was the younger son of Thawun Letya, the ex-governor of Kanba Myint (ကမ်းပါးမြင့်) and Kya-Khat-Wa-Ya (ကြခတ်ဝရာ) (both in modern Taungoo District). He was born after 1256. According to the regional chronicle Toungoo Yazawin, he was born in Pyu where his father had been placed under house arrest since 1256 by a rival governor from a Mon state to the south, which most likely was Pegu (Bago). (Note: The chronicle Toungoo Yazawin does not mention the exact name of the rival governor or the exact state over which he ruled. But he was most probably Governor of Pegu, not the rebellious Gov. Shwe of Nga Shwe of Martaban, who per (Hmannan Vol. 1 2003: 340–341) was in revolt for the first three years of Narapati's reign: (1) Pegu was the immediate Mon-speaking state to the south of Kanba Myint; (2) Chronicles do not say that the rebellion spread farther north to Dagon or Pegu; per (Hmannan Vol. 1 2003: 340–341), the Pagan army began the Martaban campaign from Dagon; (3) Even after the Martaban rebellion was put down in 1259, Thawun Letya remained confined to Pyu until his death in 1279. Thawun Letya would likely have been restored to office if the arresting governor were Shwe of Martaban.) The fight between the rival governors took place during a brief interregnum following the death of King Uzana of Pagan (Bagan) c. May 1256. At the capital Pagan (Bagan), a power struggle broke out between Crown Prince Thihathu and his half-brother Narathihapate. The court-backed Narathihapate emerged winner by November 1256. Since Thawun Letya remained under house arrest until his death in 1279, he may have backed Thihathu.

Thawun Nge had an elder brother named Thawun Gyi, who like him was also born in Pyu. The brothers grew up listening to their father's constant reminders about their royal descent from King Sithu II of Pagan—the two brothers were two-times-great-grandsons of Sithu II—and their rightful claim to the Kanba Myint region, which was given in fief to their ancestor Ananda Thuriya by Sithu II. Their father died in early 1279. Per Toungoo Yazawin, his last words to his two sons were to reclaim their rightful land.

== Deputy ruler of Toungoo ==
After their father's death, the two sons along with the followers (370 households) left Pyu for the north. (Note: The detention sentence apparently did not apply to the sons. And/or a new governor of Pegu had been appointed, and the new governor did not enforce the detention. According to the Mon chronicle Razadarit Ayedawbon (Pan Hla 2005: 29–30), Pagan appointed an ethnic Mon, A-Kha-Ma-Man, as governor of Pegu c. 1278/79, who after about seven years, in 1285, successfully revolted.) They decided to settle at a location, about 55 km from Pyu and about 40 km south of Kanba Myint. It was named Toungoo (Taungoo) (တောင်ငူ, "Hill's Spur") because of its location by the hills in the narrow Sittaung river valley between the Bago Yoma range and southern Shan Hills. The date of foundation was 17 April 1279. (Note: Hmannan Yazawin (Hmannan Vol. 2 2003: 161) says the city was founded on 9th waxing of Kason 641 ME (Thursday, 20 April 1279). Toungoo Yazawin (Sein Lwin Lay 2006: 19) agrees with the date 9th waxing of Kason 641 ME but also says it was a Monday. It means 9th waxing is probably a typographical error. The actual date was probably Monday, 6th waxing (not 9th waxing) of Kason 641 (Monday, 17 April 1279) since Burmese numerals ၆ (6) and ၉ (9) are very similar.)

According to Toungoo Yazawin, Thawun Nge was the more ambitious of the two brothers. He wanted the top job but had to relent as Thawun Gyi became the ruler by primogeniture. Thawun Nge settled for being the deputy. Toungoo became independent in 1287 when its overlord Pagan fell due to the Mongol invasions. Thawun Gyi never submitted to King Kyawswa (r. 1289–97), who ruled only around Pagan, but submitted to the Myinsaing rulers later at an unspecified date.

By the 1310s, Thawun Nge was getting impatient; he had been waiting in the wing for over three decades. His opening came in 1315 when Toungoo's overlord Myinsaing–Pinya faced a rebellion at Sagaing. What began as a minor thinly veiled insurrection by Prince Saw Yun against his father King Thihathu grew serious by March 1316 when Saw Yun completely fortified Sagaing. Thihathu sent two expeditions to retake Sagaing but both failed. Thawun Nge decided that it was time to remove his brother. On or right before the beginning of the Buddhist Lent that year (23 June 1317), his men assassinated Thawun Gyi in the precincts of the Tayahte Pagoda (modern Myat Saw Nyi-Naung Pagoda).

== Ruler of Toungoo ==
Thawun Nge was now finally the ruler. But by having assassinated Thawun Gyi without Pinya's permission, he was also in revolt. He was not alone, however. Toungoo's neighboring state, Taungdwin had also revolted. Thihathu did send an army led by Crown Prince Uzana, which laid siege to Toungoo. Thawun Nge successfully negotiated a deal to keep his office in exchange for his submission to Pinya. He ruled for seven more years before his death in 1324. He had two wives, Princess Saw Sala who was the chief wife and Princess Saw Omma. His son Saw Hnit succeeded him.

== Bibliography ==
- Kala, U (2006) [1724]. Maha Yazawin (in Burmese). Vol. 1–3 (4th printing ed.). Yangon: Ya-Pyei Publishing.
- Maha Sithu (2012) [1798]. Kyaw Win; Thein Hlaing (eds.). Yazawin Thit (in Burmese). Vol. 1–3 (2nd ed.). Yangon: Ya-Pyei Publishing.
- Pan Hla, Nai (2005) [1968]. Razadarit Ayedawbon (in Burmese) (8th printing ed.). Yangon: Armanthit Sarpay.
- Royal Historical Commission of Burma (2003) [1832]. Hmannan Yazawin (in Burmese). Vol. 1–3. Yangon: Ministry of Information, Myanmar.
- Sein Lwin Lay, Kahtika U (2006) [1968]. Min Taya Shwe Hti and Bayinnaung: Ketumadi Taungoo Yazawin (in Burmese) (2nd printing ed.). Yangon: Yan Aung Sarpay.
- Than Tun (1964). Studies in Burmese History (in Burmese). Vol. 1. Yangon: Maha Dagon.

Thawun Nge Pinya Kingdom Born: c. 1260 Died: 1324
Royal titles
Preceded by Thawun Gyi	Governor of Toungoo; 1317 – 1324	Succeeded by Saw Hnit
