= Paungde =

Paungde ပေါင်းတည်မြို့
- Town
- Location in Burma
- Coordinates: 18°29′0″N 95°30′0″E
- Country: Myanmar
- Region: Bago Region
- District: Pyay
- Township: Paungde
- Time zone: UTC+6.30 (MST)
- Area code: 54

Paung-deh or Paungde (Burmese: ပေါင်းတည်မြို့) is a town in Pyay District, Pegu region in Burma (Myanmar). It is the administrative seat of Paungde Township.
