= Toungoo Yazawin =

Burmese manuscript

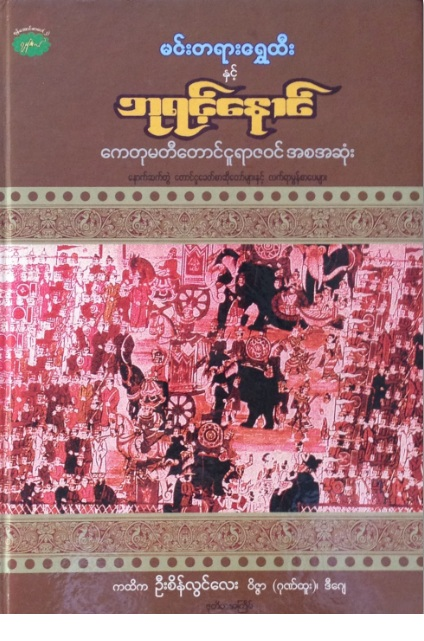
- Cover of the 2006 reprint of the edition by Sein Lwin Lay
- Author: Shin Nyana Thikhangyi
- Original title: ကေတုမတီ တောင်ငူ ရာဇဝင်
- Language: Burmese
- Series: Burmese chronicles
- Genre: Chronicle, History
- Publication date: c. 17th century
- Publication place: Kingdom of Burma

Ketumadi Toungoo Yazawin (Burmese: ကေတုမတီ တောင်ငူ ရာဇဝင်, lit. 'Chronicle of Toungoo') is a Burmese chronicle that covers the history of Toungoo from 1279 to 1613. An 1837 palm-leaf manuscript copy of an earlier copy has survived. The chronicle only provides a brief summary of early rulers. A more detailed account of later rulers begins with the reign of Min Sithu of Toungoo (r. 1481–1485), suggesting that the chronicle was first compiled in the late 15th century.

== See also ==
- List of rulers of Toungoo

== Bibliography ==
- Royal Historical Commission of Burma (1832). Hmannan Yazawin (in Burmese). Vol. 1–3 (2003 ed.). Yangon: Ministry of Information, Myanmar.
- Sein Lwin Lay, Kahtika U (2006). Mintaya Shwe Hti and Bayinnaung: Ketumadi Taungoo Yazawin (in Burmese) (2nd printing ed.). Yangon: Yan Aung Sarpay.
- Than Htut, U; U Thaw Kaung (2003). "Myanmar Historical Fiction and Their Historical Context" (PDF). Manusya: Journal of Humanities (3). Bangkok: Chulalongkorn University.
