= Ava–Hanthawaddy War (1408–1410) orders of battle =

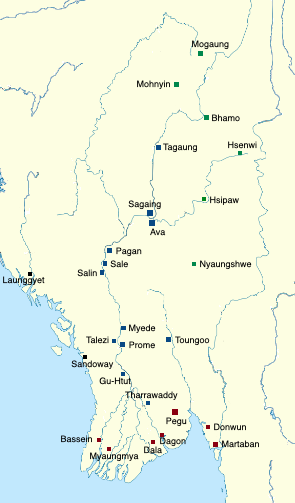
Ava and Hanthawaddy forces fought in Arakan on the western coast and along the Sittaung river near Pegu in 1408–1410.

This is a list of orders of battle for the 1408–1410 campaigns of the Ava–Hanthawaddy War (1408–1418).

== Background ==
=== Sources ===
The orders of battles for Ava in this article are sourced from the main royal chronicles—the Maha Yazawin, the Yazawin Thit and the Hmannan Yazawin, which primarily narrate the war from the Ava side. (Note: See (Maha Yazawin Vol. 1 2006: 332–340), (Maha Yazawin Vol. 2 2006: 26–27), (Yazawin Thit Vol. 1 2012: 228–236), (Hmannan Vol. 1 2003: 474–484), and (Hmannan Vol. 2 2003: 2).) The orders of battle for Hanthawaddy Pegu are mainly sourced from Nai Pan Hla's version of the Razadarit Ayedawbon, which has incorporated narratives of the Pak Lat Chronicles. (Note: See (Pan Hla 2005: 240–271).) The Rakhine Razawin Thit, which narrate from the Arakanese perspective, is the only chronicle that mentions the subsequent campaigns in Arakan between the two armies, after the initial Hanthawaddy invasion.

=== Adjustment of strength figures ===
The military strength figures in this article have been reduced by an order of magnitude from those reported in the chronicles, following G.E. Harvey's and Victor Lieberman's analyses of Burmese chronicles' military strength figures in general. (Note: See (Harvey 1925: 333–335)'s "Numerical Note". (Lieberman 2014: 98) writing on the First Toungoo period concurs: "Military mobilizations were probably more of a boast than a realistic estimate. Modern industrial states have difficulty placing 10% of their people under arms.")

== Hanthawaddy invasion of Arakan (March 1408) ==
=== Hanthawaddy Pegu ===
Pegu Order of Battle, March 1408
Unit	Commanders	Strength (Note: Unless otherwise stated, the military mobilization figures in this article are reduced by an order of magnitude from those reported in the royal chronicles, per G.E. Harvey's analysis in his History of Burma (1925) in the section Numerical Note (pp. 333–335).)	Reference(s)
Hanthawaddy Expeditionary Force	(Byat Za? or Dein Mani-Yut?)	4000 (or 5000) troops, 20 (or 30) elephants	(Note: Various chronicles report differing figures: The Razadarit Ayedawbon gives 5000 troops with "several" cavalry and elephants for the strength of the first army, and the same for the second army. The commanders of the two armies were Smin Paik-Nye and Smin Maw-Khwin, respectively. It does not mention Byat Za (or Dein) as part of the expedition force in any capacity at all.; The Maha Yazawin says the overall strike force consisted of 40,000 troops and 300 elephants, and the commander-in-chief was Gen. Byat Za.; The Yazawin Thit gives 40,000 troops and 200 elephants as the overall strength.; The Hmannan Yazawin says 40,000 troops and 100 elephants for the overall strike force, commanded by Byat Za.; The Rakhine Razawin Thit says 50,000 troops, and the commander-in-chief was Dein Mani-Yut. Smin Maw-Khwin remained in Launggyet with a Hanthawaddy regiment after Min Khayi was placed on the Launggyet throne.)
1st Division	Smin Paik-Nye, Commander; Smin Sam Lek, Smin Than-Kye Deputy Commanders	2000+ troops, 10+ elephants	
2nd Division	Smin Maw-Khwin, Commander; Smin Lauk Ni-Ye and Smin Zeik-Gaung Thiri, Deputy Commanders	2000+ troops, 10+ elephants	

=== Ava ===
Ava Order of Battle, March 1408
Unit	Commander	Strength	Reference(s)
Royal Launggyet Army	King Anawrahta of Launggyet	300+ troops	(Note: None of the chronicles provide any prewar strength figures for Ava's Arakan Area forces. The Razadarit says the victorious Hanthawaddy forces captured over 3000 troops (i.e. 300 troops, adjusted down).)
Launggyet Regiment			(Note: None of the chronicles provide any prewar strength figures for Ava's Arakan Area forces. The Razadarit says the victorious Hanthawaddy forces captured over 3000 troops (i.e. 300 troops, adjusted down).)
Sandoway Regiment			(Note: None of the chronicles provide any prewar strength figures for Ava's Arakan Area forces. The Razadarit says the victorious Hanthawaddy forces captured over 3000 troops (i.e. 300 troops, adjusted down).)

== Ava invasion of Hanthawaddy (April 1408) ==
=== Ava ===
==== Invasion armies ====
The combined strength of the invasion armies was 24,000 to 26,000 troops, 2200 cavalry, and 100 elephants.

Ava Order of Battle, April 1408
Unit	Commander	Strength	Reference(s)
Vanguard Army	Crown Prince Minye Kyawswa	20,000 to 22,000 troops, 2000 cavalry, 80 elephants	(Note: Chronicles report slightly different figures: The Maha Yazawin gives 22 regiments (200,000 troops, 20,000 cavalry, 800 elephants).; The Yazawin Thit gives 21 regiments (220,000 troops, 20,000 cavalry, 800 elephants).; The Hmannan Yazawin gives 22 regiments (220,000 troops, 20,000 cavalry, 800 elephants); The Razadarit, which reports from Hanthawaddy's perspective, estimates the enemy's strength as 15,000 troops, 600 cavalry and 60 elephants.; One key difference is that the Yazawin Thit says Crown Prince Minye Kyawswa did not go to the front, rather he remained at Ava to lead the Capital Defense Corps whereas both the Maha Yazawin and Hmannan chronicles say Minye Kyawswa did go to the front.)
Sagu Regiment	Thiri Zeya Kyawhtin of Sagu		
Salin Regiment	Nawrahta of Salin		
Nyaungyan Regiment	Baya Kyawhtin of Nyaungyan		
Prome Regiment	Letya Pyanchi of Prome		
Pagan Regiment	Uzana of Pagan		
Talok Regiment	Yazathu of Talok		
Pakhan Regiment	Tarabya I of Pakhan		
Yamethin Regiment	Sithu Pauk Hla of Yamethin		
Wadi Regiment	Thinkhaya of Wadi		
Yindaw Regiment	Min Maha of Yindaw		
Taungdwin Regiment	Thihapate III of Taungdwin		
Toungoo Regiment	Min Nemi of Toungoo		
Kanni Regiment	Minye Shwetaung of Kanni		
Myohla Regiment	Thado of Myohla		
Singu Regiment	Min Letwe of Singu		
Pyinzi Regiment	Nandathingyan of Pyinzi		
Hlaingdet Regiment	Tuyin Theinzi of Hlaingdet		
Amyint Regiment	Yazathingyan of Amyint		
Onbaung Regiment	Tho Kyaung Bwa of Onbaung		
Nyaungshwe Regiment	Htaw Hmaing Gyi of Nyaungshwe		
Kale Regiment	Min Nyo of Kale		
Ava Regiment	Crown Prince Minye Kyawswa		
Royal Main Army (Tatmadaw)	King Minkhaung I	4,000 troops, 200 cavalry, 20 elephants	(Note: The Maha Yazawin, Yazawin Thit and Hmannan chronicles report 40,000 troops, 2000 cavalry and 200 elephants for the Tatmadaw.)
Vanguard Regiment	Minhla Shwetaung		(Note: The Maha Yazawin, Yazawin Thit and Hmannan chronicles report 40,000 troops, 2000 cavalry and 200 elephants for the Tatmadaw.)
Right Flank Regiment	Nataungmya		(Note: The Maha Yazawin, Yazawin Thit and Hmannan chronicles report 40,000 troops, 2000 cavalry and 200 elephants for the Tatmadaw.)
Left Flank Regiment	Nanda Yawda		(Note: The Maha Yazawin, Yazawin Thit and Hmannan chronicles report 40,000 troops, 2000 cavalry and 200 elephants for the Tatmadaw.)
Rearguard Regiment	Nanda Thuriya		(Note: The Maha Yazawin, Yazawin Thit and Hmannan chronicles report 40,000 troops, 2000 cavalry and 200 elephants for the Tatmadaw.)

==== Defensive armies ====
The Capital Defense Corps was in charge of defending the Ava capital region. The Prome Defense Corps consisted of 12 battalions from the nearby regions, and were responsible for safeguarding Prome itself as well as the supply lines to the front.

Ava Order of Battle, April 1408
Unit	Commander	Strength	Reference(s)
Ava Capital Defense Corps	Prince Thihathu	4 regiments (of unspecified strength)	(Note: All three main chronicles say the Capital Defense Corps consisted of four regiments. The Maha Yazawin says Prince Thihathu was the overall commander while the Yazawin Thit says Crown Prince Minye Kyawswa was in charge. The Hmannan sides with the Maha Yazawin.)
1st Ava Regiment	Thihathu		(Note: All three main chronicles say the Capital Defense Corps consisted of four regiments. The Maha Yazawin says Prince Thihathu was the overall commander while the Yazawin Thit says Crown Prince Minye Kyawswa was in charge. The Hmannan sides with the Maha Yazawin.)
2nd Ava Regiment	Khin Ba		(Note: All three main chronicles say the Capital Defense Corps consisted of four regiments. The Maha Yazawin says Prince Thihathu was the overall commander while the Yazawin Thit says Crown Prince Minye Kyawswa was in charge. The Hmannan sides with the Maha Yazawin.)
3rd Ava Regiment	Sittuyingathu		(Note: All three main chronicles say the Capital Defense Corps consisted of four regiments. The Maha Yazawin says Prince Thihathu was the overall commander while the Yazawin Thit says Crown Prince Minye Kyawswa was in charge. The Hmannan sides with the Maha Yazawin.)
4th Ava Regiment	Baya Gamani		(Note: All three main chronicles say the Capital Defense Corps consisted of four regiments. The Maha Yazawin says Prince Thihathu was the overall commander while the Yazawin Thit says Crown Prince Minye Kyawswa was in charge. The Hmannan sides with the Maha Yazawin.)
Prome Defense Corps	?	12 battalions (of unspecified strength)	(Note: Chronicles do not mention the overall commander of the Prome Defense Corps. It was not Gov. Letya Pyanchi, who went to the front in the vanguard army.)
Mindon Battalion			(Note: Chronicles do not mention the overall commander of the Prome Defense Corps. It was not Gov. Letya Pyanchi, who went to the front in the vanguard army.)
Taingda Battalion			(Note: Chronicles do not mention the overall commander of the Prome Defense Corps. It was not Gov. Letya Pyanchi, who went to the front in the vanguard army.)
Mindat Battalion			(Note: Chronicles do not mention the overall commander of the Prome Defense Corps. It was not Gov. Letya Pyanchi, who went to the front in the vanguard army.)
Myede Battalion			(Note: Chronicles do not mention the overall commander of the Prome Defense Corps. It was not Gov. Letya Pyanchi, who went to the front in the vanguard army.)
Thayet Battalion			(Note: Chronicles do not mention the overall commander of the Prome Defense Corps. It was not Gov. Letya Pyanchi, who went to the front in the vanguard army.)
Legaing Battalion			(Note: Chronicles do not mention the overall commander of the Prome Defense Corps. It was not Gov. Letya Pyanchi, who went to the front in the vanguard army.)
Pandaung Battalion			(Note: Chronicles do not mention the overall commander of the Prome Defense Corps. It was not Gov. Letya Pyanchi, who went to the front in the vanguard army.)
Pakhan Nge Battalion			(Note: Chronicles do not mention the overall commander of the Prome Defense Corps. It was not Gov. Letya Pyanchi, who went to the front in the vanguard army.)
Myothit Battalion			(Note: Chronicles do not mention the overall commander of the Prome Defense Corps. It was not Gov. Letya Pyanchi, who went to the front in the vanguard army.)
Hsaw Battalion			(Note: Chronicles do not mention the overall commander of the Prome Defense Corps. It was not Gov. Letya Pyanchi, who went to the front in the vanguard army.)
Hpaunglin Battalion			(Note: Chronicles do not mention the overall commander of the Prome Defense Corps. It was not Gov. Letya Pyanchi, who went to the front in the vanguard army.)
Kyunzon Battalion			(Note: Chronicles do not mention the overall commander of the Prome Defense Corps. It was not Gov. Letya Pyanchi, who went to the front in the vanguard army.)

=== Hanthawaddy Pegu ===
The following lists the order of battle of the remaining Hanthawaddy army in the home country. Note that the regimental commanders are as those reported in the three main chronicles; the Razadarit does not provide a commander list. At least two notable differences in reporting exist:

- The main chronicles list Smin Maw-Khwin, one of the two commanders of the Arakan Expeditionary Strike Force, as one of the commanders in the main Hanthawaddy army. This means he had gotten back from Arakan. However, according to the Rakhine Razawin Thit, Maw-Khwin remained in Launggyet (until he was driven back by an Ava army later in the year).
- The main chronicles say Smin Ye-Thin-Yan was one of the commanders of the opposing army while the Razadarit says he was in charge of the Capital Defense Corps in Pegu. Both narratives are not mutually exclusive: Ye-Thin-Yan's regiment may have stayed behind to guard the capital.

Pegu Order of Battle, April 1408
Unit	Commander	Strength	Reference(s)
Royal Hanthawaddy Main Army	King Razadarit	9 regiments, 8,000 troops, 300 cavalry, 20 (to 60) elephants	(Note: The Razadarit reports 80,000 troops, 600+ elephants. It does not report commander names. Smin Ye-Thin-Yan was in charge of the Capital Defense Corps.; The Maha Yazawin, Yazawin Thit and Hmannan give 10 regiments, 80,000 troops, 3000 cavalry, 200 elephants)
1st Regiment	Lagun Ein		(Note: The Razadarit reports 80,000 troops, 600+ elephants. It does not report commander names. Smin Ye-Thin-Yan was in charge of the Capital Defense Corps.; The Maha Yazawin, Yazawin Thit and Hmannan give 10 regiments, 80,000 troops, 3000 cavalry, 200 elephants)
2nd Regiment	Byat Za		(Note: The Razadarit reports 80,000 troops, 600+ elephants. It does not report commander names. Smin Ye-Thin-Yan was in charge of the Capital Defense Corps.; The Maha Yazawin, Yazawin Thit and Hmannan give 10 regiments, 80,000 troops, 3000 cavalry, 200 elephants)
3rd Regiment	Dein Mani-Yut		(Note: The Razadarit reports 80,000 troops, 600+ elephants. It does not report commander names. Smin Ye-Thin-Yan was in charge of the Capital Defense Corps.; The Maha Yazawin, Yazawin Thit and Hmannan give 10 regiments, 80,000 troops, 3000 cavalry, 200 elephants)
4th Regiment	Smin Awa Naing		(Note: The Razadarit reports 80,000 troops, 600+ elephants. It does not report commander names. Smin Ye-Thin-Yan was in charge of the Capital Defense Corps.; The Maha Yazawin, Yazawin Thit and Hmannan give 10 regiments, 80,000 troops, 3000 cavalry, 200 elephants)
5th Regiment	Smin Upakaung		(Note: The Razadarit reports 80,000 troops, 600+ elephants. It does not report commander names. Smin Ye-Thin-Yan was in charge of the Capital Defense Corps.; The Maha Yazawin, Yazawin Thit and Hmannan give 10 regiments, 80,000 troops, 3000 cavalry, 200 elephants)
6th Regiment	Zeik-Bye		(Note: The Razadarit reports 80,000 troops, 600+ elephants. It does not report commander names. Smin Ye-Thin-Yan was in charge of the Capital Defense Corps.; The Maha Yazawin, Yazawin Thit and Hmannan give 10 regiments, 80,000 troops, 3000 cavalry, 200 elephants)
7th Regiment	Smin Maw-Khwin		(Note: The Razadarit reports 80,000 troops, 600+ elephants. It does not report commander names. Smin Ye-Thin-Yan was in charge of the Capital Defense Corps.; The Maha Yazawin, Yazawin Thit and Hmannan give 10 regiments, 80,000 troops, 3000 cavalry, 200 elephants)
8th Regiment	Smin Pun-Si		(Note: The Razadarit reports 80,000 troops, 600+ elephants. It does not report commander names. Smin Ye-Thin-Yan was in charge of the Capital Defense Corps.; The Maha Yazawin, Yazawin Thit and Hmannan give 10 regiments, 80,000 troops, 3000 cavalry, 200 elephants)
Royal Regiment	Razadarit		(Note: The Razadarit reports 80,000 troops, 600+ elephants. It does not report commander names. Smin Ye-Thin-Yan was in charge of the Capital Defense Corps.; The Maha Yazawin, Yazawin Thit and Hmannan give 10 regiments, 80,000 troops, 3000 cavalry, 200 elephants)
Capital Defense Corps	Smin Ye-Thin-Yan	?	(Note: Per the Razadarit.)

== Ava withdrawal (August 1408) ==
=== Ava ===
Ava Order of Battle, August 1408
Unit	Commander	Strength	Reference(s)
Rearguard Army	Sithu Pauk Hla of Yamethin	8 regiments (8000 troops, 800 cavalry, 20 elephants)	
1st Regiment	Thihapate III of Taungdwin		
2nd Regiment	Letya Pyanchi of Prome		
3rd Regiment	Nawrahta of Salin		
4th Regiment	Uzana of Pagan		
5th Regiment	Tarabya I of Pakhan		
6th Regiment	Min Nyo of Kale		
7th Regiment	Thado of Myohla		
8th Regiment	Sithu Pauk Hla of Yamethin		

=== Hanthawaddy Pegu ===
The following is the orders of battle of the two Hanthawaddy armies as reported in the main chronicles; the first army's job was to pursue Minkhaung's main army while that of the second army was to pursue the Ava Rearguard Army. However, the Razadarit Ayedawbon does not mention a second army (organized under a single commander), and says Smin Ye-Thin-Yan remained in charge of the Capital Defense Corps at Pegu.

Pegu Order of Battle, August 1408
Unit	Commander	Strength	Reference(s)
Royal Hanthawaddy Main Army	Razadarit	6 regiments	(Note: Per the main chronicles. The Razadarit reports only the army that chased Minkhaung's army.)
1st Regiment	Lagun Ein		(Note: Per the main chronicles. The Razadarit reports only the army that chased Minkhaung's army.)
2nd Regiment	Smin Upakaung		(Note: Per the main chronicles. The Razadarit reports only the army that chased Minkhaung's army.)
3rd Regiment	Smin Maw-Khwin		(Note: Per the main chronicles. The Razadarit reports only the army that chased Minkhaung's army.)
4th Regiment	Dein Mani-Yut		(Note: Per the main chronicles. The Razadarit reports only the army that chased Minkhaung's army.)
5th Regiment	Byat Za		(Note: Per the main chronicles. The Razadarit reports only the army that chased Minkhaung's army.)
Royal Regiment	Razadarit		(Note: Per the main chronicles. The Razadarit reports only the army that chased Minkhaung's army.)
2nd Army		5 regiments	(Note: The main chronicles say the 2nd Army consisted of six regiments, including one led by Smin Ye-Thin-Yan. The Razadarit does not list the 2nd Army or its commanders but does say that Ye-Thin-Yan remained in charge of the Capital Defense Corps in Pegu.)
1st Regiment	Smin Awa Naing		(Note: The main chronicles say the 2nd Army consisted of six regiments, including one led by Smin Ye-Thin-Yan. The Razadarit does not list the 2nd Army or its commanders but does say that Ye-Thin-Yan remained in charge of the Capital Defense Corps in Pegu.)
2nd Regiment	Zeik-Bye		(Note: The main chronicles say the 2nd Army consisted of six regiments, including one led by Smin Ye-Thin-Yan. The Razadarit does not list the 2nd Army or its commanders but does say that Ye-Thin-Yan remained in charge of the Capital Defense Corps in Pegu.)
3rd Regiment	Smin Zeik-Pun		(Note: The main chronicles say the 2nd Army consisted of six regiments, including one led by Smin Ye-Thin-Yan. The Razadarit does not list the 2nd Army or its commanders but does say that Ye-Thin-Yan remained in charge of the Capital Defense Corps in Pegu.)
4th Regiment	Smin Than-Kye		(Note: The main chronicles say the 2nd Army consisted of six regiments, including one led by Smin Ye-Thin-Yan. The Razadarit does not list the 2nd Army or its commanders but does say that Ye-Thin-Yan remained in charge of the Capital Defense Corps in Pegu.)
5th Regiment	Smin E-Ba-Ye		(Note: The main chronicles say the 2nd Army consisted of six regiments, including one led by Smin Ye-Thin-Yan. The Razadarit does not list the 2nd Army or its commanders but does say that Ye-Thin-Yan remained in charge of the Capital Defense Corps in Pegu.)
Capital Defense Corps	Smin Ye-Thin-Yan	?	(Note: Per the Razadarit.)

== Ava invasion of Arakan (1408–1409) ==
According to the Rakhine Razawin Thit chronicle, Ava forces led by the lord of Myinsaing drove out the combined Hanthawaddy and Launggyet forces. However, a new Hanthawaddy force returned, and drove out the Ava army out of Launggyet. An Ava regiment remained in Arakan at Nga-khawy-thin-daung for another three years, until it too was driven out by another Hanthawaddy army.

=== Ava ===
Ava Order of Battle, 1408–1409
Unit	Commander	Strength	Reference(s)
Ava Expeditionary Force	Thray Sithu of Myinsaing	?	

=== Hanthawaddy and Launggyet ===
Pegu and Launggyet Order of Battle, 1408–1409
Unit	Commander	Strength	Reference(s)
Hanthawaddy Expeditionary Force	Smin Maw-Khwin	?	(Note: The Rakhine Razawin Thit says it was Min Khayi that accompanied the Hanthwaddy army. However, the main chronicles and the Razadarit all say Min Saw Mon was still in charge of Launggyet in early 1411 when he faced Minye Kyawswa's invasion army for a second time.)
Launggyet Army	Min Khayi (or Min Saw Mon)		(Note: The Rakhine Razawin Thit says it was Min Khayi that accompanied the Hanthwaddy army. However, the main chronicles and the Razadarit all say Min Saw Mon was still in charge of Launggyet in early 1411 when he faced Minye Kyawswa's invasion army for a second time.)

== Ava invasion of Hanthawaddy (October 1409) ==
=== Ava ===
==== Invasion armies ====
Ava Order of Battle, 1409
Unit	Commander	Strength	Reference(s)
Ava Vanguard Army	Sithu Pauk Hla of Yamethin	10 regiments (10,000 troops, 1000 cavalry, 80 elephants)	(Note: Per the main chronicles: The Vanguard Army consisted of 10 regiments (100,000 troops, 10,000 cavalry, 800 elephants); The Royal Main Army consisted of 4 regiments (40,000 troops, 4000 cavalry, 200 elephants))
Onbaung Regiment	Tho Kyaung Bwa of Onbaung		(Note: Per the main chronicles: The Vanguard Army consisted of 10 regiments (100,000 troops, 10,000 cavalry, 800 elephants); The Royal Main Army consisted of 4 regiments (40,000 troops, 4000 cavalry, 200 elephants))
Taungdwin Regiment	Thihapate III of Taungdwin		(Note: Per the main chronicles: The Vanguard Army consisted of 10 regiments (100,000 troops, 10,000 cavalry, 800 elephants); The Royal Main Army consisted of 4 regiments (40,000 troops, 4000 cavalry, 200 elephants))
Myohla Regiment	Thado of Myohla		(Note: Per the main chronicles: The Vanguard Army consisted of 10 regiments (100,000 troops, 10,000 cavalry, 800 elephants); The Royal Main Army consisted of 4 regiments (40,000 troops, 4000 cavalry, 200 elephants))
Yamethin Regiment	Sithu Pauk Hla of Yamethin		(Note: Per the main chronicles: The Vanguard Army consisted of 10 regiments (100,000 troops, 10,000 cavalry, 800 elephants); The Royal Main Army consisted of 4 regiments (40,000 troops, 4000 cavalry, 200 elephants))
5th Regiment	unnamed		(Note: Per the main chronicles: The Vanguard Army consisted of 10 regiments (100,000 troops, 10,000 cavalry, 800 elephants); The Royal Main Army consisted of 4 regiments (40,000 troops, 4000 cavalry, 200 elephants))
6th Regiment	unnamed		(Note: Per the main chronicles: The Vanguard Army consisted of 10 regiments (100,000 troops, 10,000 cavalry, 800 elephants); The Royal Main Army consisted of 4 regiments (40,000 troops, 4000 cavalry, 200 elephants))
7th Regiment	unnamed		(Note: Per the main chronicles: The Vanguard Army consisted of 10 regiments (100,000 troops, 10,000 cavalry, 800 elephants); The Royal Main Army consisted of 4 regiments (40,000 troops, 4000 cavalry, 200 elephants))
8th Regiment	unnamed		(Note: Per the main chronicles: The Vanguard Army consisted of 10 regiments (100,000 troops, 10,000 cavalry, 800 elephants); The Royal Main Army consisted of 4 regiments (40,000 troops, 4000 cavalry, 200 elephants))
9th Regiment	unnamed		(Note: Per the main chronicles: The Vanguard Army consisted of 10 regiments (100,000 troops, 10,000 cavalry, 800 elephants); The Royal Main Army consisted of 4 regiments (40,000 troops, 4000 cavalry, 200 elephants))
10th Regiment	unnamed		(Note: Per the main chronicles: The Vanguard Army consisted of 10 regiments (100,000 troops, 10,000 cavalry, 800 elephants); The Royal Main Army consisted of 4 regiments (40,000 troops, 4000 cavalry, 200 elephants))
Royal Main Army	Minkhaung I	4 regiments (4000 troops, 400 cavalry, 20 elephants)	(Note: Per the main chronicles: The Vanguard Army consisted of 10 regiments (100,000 troops, 10,000 cavalry, 800 elephants); The Royal Main Army consisted of 4 regiments (40,000 troops, 4000 cavalry, 200 elephants))
Ava Supply Corps	Prince Thihathu	?	(Note: Per the main chronicles: The Vanguard Army consisted of 10 regiments (100,000 troops, 10,000 cavalry, 800 elephants); The Royal Main Army consisted of 4 regiments (40,000 troops, 4000 cavalry, 200 elephants))

==== Defensive forces ====
Ava Order of Battle, 1409
Unit	Commander	Strength	Reference(s)
Capital Defense Corps	Crown Prince Minye Kyawswa	?	(Note: Per the main chronicles.)

=== Hanthawaddy Pegu ===
Pegu Order of Battle, 1409
Unit	Commander	Strength	Reference(s)
Royal Hanthawaddy Main Army	Razadarit	4 regiments (4000 troops, 70 elephants)	(Note: Per the Razadarit Ayedawbon.)
1st Regiment	Smin Upakaung	500 troops, 15 elephants	(Note: Per the Razadarit Ayedawbon.)
2nd Regiment	Lagun Ein	500 troops, 15 elephants	(Note: Per the Razadarit Ayedawbon.)
3rd Regiment	Byat Za [sic]	1000 troops, 10 elephants	(Note: Per the Razadarit Ayedawbon.)
Royal Regiment	Razadarit	2000 troops, 30 elephants	(Note: Per the Razadarit Ayedawbon.)
Hanthawaddy Rearguard Army	Byat Za	4 regiments (4000 troops, 400 cavalry, 20 elephants)	(Note: Per the Razadarit Ayedawbon.)
Capital Defense Corps	Smin Ye-Thin-Yan	?	

== Bibliography ==
- Harvey, G. E. (1925). History of Burma: From the Earliest Times to 10 March 1824. London: Frank Cass & Co. Ltd.
- Kala, U (2006) [1724]. Maha Yazawin (in Burmese). Vol. 1–3 (4th printing ed.). Yangon: Ya-Pyei Publishing.
- Lieberman, Victor B. (2014) [1984]. Burmese Administrative Cycles: Anarchy and Conquest, c. 1580–1760. Princeton University Press. ISBN 978-0-691-05407-0.
- Maha Sithu (2012) [1798]. Myint Swe; Kyaw Win; Thein Hlaing (eds.). Yazawin Thit (in Burmese). Vol. 1–3 (2nd printing ed.). Yangon: Ya-Pyei Publishing.
- Pan Hla, Nai (2005) [1968]. Razadarit Ayedawbon (in Burmese) (8th printing ed.). Yangon: Armanthit Sarpay.
- Royal Historical Commission of Burma (2003) [1832]. Hmannan Yazawin (in Burmese). Vol. 1–3. Yangon: Ministry of Information, Myanmar.
- Sandamala Linkara, Ashin (1997–1999) [1931]. Rakhine Yazawinthit Kyan (in Burmese). Vol. 1–2. Yangon: Tetlan Sarpay.
