= Ava–Hanthawaddy War (1414–1415) orders of battle =

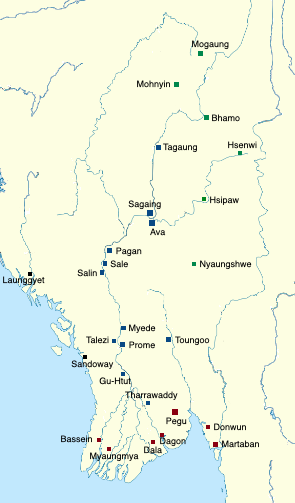
Ava and Hanthawaddy forces fought primarily in the Irrawaddy delta theater in the south in this phase of the war.

This is a list of orders of battle for the 1414–1415 campaigns of the Ava–Hanthawaddy War (1408–1418), a military war fought between the Burmese-speaking Kingdom of Ava and the Mon-speaking Kingdom of Hanthawaddy.

== Background ==
The orders of battles in this article are sourced from the main royal chronicles—the Maha Yazawin, the Yazawin Thit and the Hmannan Yazawin, which primarily narrate the war from the Ava side. (Note: See (Maha Yazawin Vol. 2 2006: 31–34), (Yazawin Thit Vol. 1 2012: 239–247), and (Hmannan Vol. 2 2003: 8–21).) For this phase of the war, the Razadarit Ayedawbon and Pak Lat Chronicles, which narrate from the Hanthawaddy perspective, provide almost no details except for the battle of Dala in March 1415. (Note: See (Pan Hla 2005: 291–317) for this phase of the war. See (Pan Hla 2005: 310) for the order of battle for Dala.)

The military strength figures in this article have been reduced by an order of magnitude from those reported in the chronicles, following G.E. Harvey's and Victor Lieberman's analyses of Burmese chronicles' military strength figures in general. (Note: See (Harvey 1925: 333–335)'s "Numerical Note". (Lieberman 2014: 98) writing on the First Toungoo period concurs: "Military mobilizations were probably more of a boast than a realistic estimate. Modern industrial states have difficulty placing 10% of their people under arms.")

== October–December 1414 ==
=== Battle of Khebaung (October 1414) ===
For the Battle of Khebaung in October 1414 in the western theater, the Ava force was commanded by Crown Prince Minye Kyawswa, accompanied by Nawrahta of Salin, Thray Sithu of Myinsaing, Yazathingyan of Sagaing, and Min Nyo of Kale. His army of eight regiments (8000 troops, with 200 or 600 cavalry and 40 or 80 elephants, (Note: Chronicles report: Maha Yazawin, and Yazawin Thit: 8 regiments (80,000 troops, 6000 cavalry, 400 elephants); Hmannan Yazawin: 8 regiments (80,000 troops, 2000 cavalry, 800 elephants)) was accompanied by a navy of six flotillas, consisting of a dozen or more warships, 500 war boats, more than 500 armored war boats, and 500 cargo boats, carrying around 13,000 troops in total. (Note: Chronicles report: Maha Yazawin: 6 flotillas (130,000 troops, 12 large war boats, 500 war boats, 800 ironclad war boats, 500 cargo boats); Yazawin Thit: 130,000 troops, 12 large war boats, 500 war boats, 500 ironclad war boats, 500 cargo boats; Hmannan Yazawin: 130,000 troops, 18 large war boats, 500 war boats, 800 ironclad war boats, 500 cargo boats) The Pegu force was commanded by Smin Ye-Thin-Yan, who was killed in the battle.

==== Ava ====
Ava Order of Battle, October 1414
Unit	Commander	Strength (Note: Unless otherwise stated, the military mobilization figures in this article are reduced by an order of magnitude from those reported in the royal chronicles, per G.E. Harvey's analysis in his History of Burma (1925) in the section Numerical Note (pp. 333–335).)	Reference(s)
Main Strike Force	Crown Prince Minye Kyawswa	21,000 troops, 200 (or 600) cavalry, 40 (or 80) elephants, 100+ war boats, 50 cargo boats	
1st Army	Including: Nawrahta of Salin; Thray Sithu of Myinsaing; Yazathingyan of Sagaing; Min Nyo of Kale; Sittuyingathu	8 regiments (8000 troops, 200 (or 600) cavalry, 40 (or 80) elephants)	
Navy	Including: Nawrahta of Salin; Thray Sithu of Myinsaing; Yazathingyan of Sagaing; Min Nyo of Kale; Sittuyingathu	6 flotillas (13,000 troops, 12+ large war boats, 50 war boats, 50+ ironclad war boats, 50 cargo boats)	

==== Hanthawaddy Pegu ====
Pegu Order of Battle, October 1414
Unit	Commander	Strength	Reference(s)
Khebaung Corps	Smin Ye-Thin-Yan †		

=== Battle of Panko (October/November 1414) ===
The name of the battle of Panko, which occurred in October or November, is mentioned only in the Razadarit and Yazawin Thit. The Maha Yazawin only cursorily mentions that Smin Bayan was captured in battle but does not say in which battle. The Hmannan describes the battle as part of Minye Kyawswa's southern drive but does not mention the name of the location. The Ava army was commanded by Minye Kyawswa, and the navy by Nawrahta of Salin; the Pegu navy was led by Smin Bayan, who surrendered, and its army by Prince Binnya Dhammaraza.

==== Ava ====
Ava Order of Battle, October/November 1414
Unit	Commander	Strength	Reference(s)
1st Army	Minye Kyawswa		
Navy	Nawrahta of Salin		
	Including: Nanda Yawda; Letya Htaung-Hmu		

==== Hanthawaddy Pegu ====
Pegu Order of Battle, October/November 1414
Unit	Commander	Strength	Reference(s)
Hanthawaddy Navy	Smin Bayan (surrendered)		
	Including: Paik-Thin-Yan		
Panko Regiment	Prince Binnya Dhammaraza		

=== Sieges of Bassein and Myaungmya (October/November–December 1414) ===
At the first battles of Bassein and Myaungmya (October/November 1414), the Ava army was again led by Minye Kyawswa; the Pegu defences at Bassein and Myaungmya, which included their own naval flotillas, were led by Dein Mani-Yut and Smin Saw Htut respectively.

==== Ava ====
Ava Order of Battle, October/November 1414
Unit	Commander	Strength	Reference(s)
1st Army	Minye Kyawswa		
Navy			

==== Hanthawaddy Pegu ====
Pegu Order of Battle, October/November 1414
Unit	Commander	Strength	Reference(s)
Bassein Corps	Dein Mani-Yut		(Note: Bassein and Myaungmya defenses included their own naval flotillas.)
Myaungmya Corps	Smin Saw Htut		(Note: Bassein and Myaungmya defenses included their own naval flotillas.)

The second battles began after Minye Kyawswa returned from Ava, which took 22 days in total. (Note: Minye Kyawswa sailed up to Ava to present Smin Bayan and other key prisoners of war (11 days), spent 7 days at the capital, and returned to the south (4 nights, 5 days).) The Ava forces, consisting of three regiments, were commanded by Nawrahta of Salin and Thiri Pyanchi; the Pegu defence at Myaungmya retained Smin Saw Htut, but at Bassein Smin Maw-Khwin II was in charge. (Note: After Dein Mani-Yut was recalled to Pegu in November, his command at Bassein was taken over by a commander titled Smin Maw-Khwin. This Smin Maw-Khwin apparently had succeeded the previous Smin Maw-Khwin who was captured near Toungoo in October.)

==== Ava ====
Ava Order of Battle, December 1414
Unit	Commander	Strength	Reference(s)
Western Division, 1st Army	Nawrahta of Salin	3 regiments	
? Regiment	Thiri Pyanchi		
1st Shan Regiment	?		
Salin Regiment	Nawrahta of Salin		

==== Hanthawaddy Pegu ====
Pegu Order of Battle, December 1414
Unit	Commander	Strength	Reference(s)
Bassein Corps	Smin Maw-Khwin II		(Note: After Dein Mani-Yut was recalled to Pegu in November, his command at Bassein was taken over by a commander titled Smin Maw-Khwin. This Smin Maw-Khwin apparently had succeeded the previous Smin Maw-Khwin who was captured near Toungoo in October.)
Myaungmya Corps	Smin Saw Htut		(Note: After Dein Mani-Yut was recalled to Pegu in November, his command at Bassein was taken over by a commander titled Smin Maw-Khwin. This Smin Maw-Khwin apparently had succeeded the previous Smin Maw-Khwin who was captured near Toungoo in October.)

=== Battle of Hsabaga (October 1414) ===
Prince Thihathu attempted to invade down the eastern side of the Irrawaddy and Hlaing rivers through Hsabaga, which was the eastern border demarcation point per the 1403 Treaty of Prome. At the Battle of Hsabaga (October 1414), Thihathu's army included troops from Hpaunghnin, Mindon (whose lord was killed), Nattaung (whose lord surrendered), and Ahlwe, in addition to his own Ava troops. The chronicles mention only the commanders but do not mention the strength of the second army. The Pegu army and navy was led by Prince Binnya Bassein, aided by Upakaung Minhla Kyawkhaung and Lauk Na-Re.

==== Ava ====
Ava Order of Battle, October 1414
Unit	Commander	Strength	Reference(s)
2nd Army	Thihathu		(Note: Chronicles mention only the commanders but do not mention the strength of the second army.)
Hpaunghnin Regiment	Lord of Hpaunghnin		(Note: Chronicles mention only the commanders but do not mention the strength of the second army.)
Mindon Regiment	Lord of Mindon †		(Note: Chronicles mention only the commanders but do not mention the strength of the second army.)
Nattaung Regiment	Lord of Nattaung (surrendered)		(Note: Chronicles mention only the commanders but do not mention the strength of the second army.)
Ahlwe Regiment	Lord of Ahlwe		(Note: Chronicles mention only the commanders but do not mention the strength of the second army.)
Ava Regiment	Thihathu		(Note: Chronicles mention only the commanders but do not mention the strength of the second army.)

==== Hanthawaddy Pegu ====
Pegu Order of Battle, October 1414
Unit	Commander	Strength	Reference(s)
Army and Navy	Prince Binnya Bassein		
	Upakaung Minhla Kyawkhaung		
	Lauk Na-Re		

=== Hanthawaddy invasion towards Toungoo (October 1414) ===
The Pegu force invading towards Toungoo was led by Smin Maw-Khwin of Sayat, who surrendered, and Smin Saw Paik, who died in battle; they faced Thinkhaya I of Toungoo.

==== Hanthawaddy Pegu ====
Pegu Order of Battle, October 1414
Unit	Commander	Strength	Reference(s)
Hanthawaddy Army and Navy	Smin Maw-Khwin of Sayat (surrendered) Smin Saw Paik †		

==== Ava ====
Ava Order of Battle, October 1414
Unit	Commander	Strength	Reference(s)
Toungoo Regiment	Thinkhaya I of Toungoo		

== December 1414–March 1415 ==
According to the main chronicles, the siege of Dala began after Minye Kyawswa returned from Ava, which took 22 days in total. By then, Razadarit had already moved to Martaban (Mottama) since the first half of November from Pegu. The siege of Dala lasted until 2 March 1415. Minye Kyawswa's force included Nanda Thuriya of Sale (né Sittuyingathu) and Nanda Kyawthu of Kinda (né Letwe Nanda Yawda), and was joined after December by Nawrahta of Salin.

All the main chronicles as well as the Razadarit Ayedawbon chronicle say Minye Kyawswa laid siege to Dala, defended by Prince Binnya Dala. However, the Pak Lat chronicle says Minye Kyawswa laid siege to the capital Pegu, which was defended by Prince Binnya Kyan, the title later worn by Binnya Dala, who was accompanied at the siege by Smin Awa Naing, Smin Sithu, Smin Sam Lek II, Smin Paik-Nye, and Maha Thamun, in addition to regiments from Dagon and Syriam.

=== Ava ===
Ava Order of Battle, c. December 1414–March 1415
Unit	Commander	Strength	Reference(s)
Main Division, 1st Army	Minye Kyawswa		
Including...
	Nanda Thuriya of Sale		
	Nanda Kyawthu of Kinda		
After December, joined by...
Western Division, 1st Army	Nawrahta of Salin		

=== Hanthawaddy Pegu ===
Pegu Order of Battle, c. December 1414–March 1415
Unit	Commander	Strength	Reference(s)
Dala Corps	Prince Binnya Dala		
Including...
	Smin Awa Naing		
	Smin Sithu		
	Smin Sam Lek II		
	Smin Paik-Nye		
	Maha Thamun		
Dagon Regiment			
Syriam Regiment			

=== Battle of Dala (13 March 1415) ===
==== Ava ====
Ava Order of Battle, 13 March 1415
Unit	Commander	Strength	Reference(s)
Main Division, 1st Army	Minye Kyawswa †	4 regiments (2500+ troops, 250+ cavalry, 16+ elephants)	(Note: According to the Yazawin Thit and Hmannan, Nanda Thuriya of Sale and Thettawshay of Myedu also fell in action. The Pak Lat says an Ava regimental commander named Min Maha Letya fell in action.)
Vanguard Regiment	Minye Kyawswa †	300 troops, 100 (or 300) cavalry, ? elephants	(Note: Chronicles report: Maha Yazawin: 3000 troops, 3,000 cavalry, ? elephants; Yazawin Thit: 3000 troops, 100 cavalry, ? elephants; Hmannan: 3000 troops, 3000 cavalry, ? elephants)
Arakan Regiment	Lord of Arakan	700 troops, 50 cavalry, 5 elephants	(Note: Chronicles Maha Yazawin, Yazawin Thit and Hmannan all report 7000 troops, 500 cavalry, 50 elephants.)
Kale Regiment	Min Nyo of Kale	1000 (or 500) troops, 70 (or 50) cavalry, 5 elephants	(Note: Chronicles report: Maha Yazawin: 10,000 troops, 700 cavalry, 50 elephants; Yazawin Thit: 10,000 troops, 500 cavalry, 50 elephants; Hmannan: 5000 troops, 700 cavalry, 50 elephants)
Salin Regiment	Nawrahta of Salin	1000 troops, 50 cavalry, 5 elephants	(Note: Chronicles report: Maha Yazawin: 10,000 troops, 500 cavalry, 50 elephants; Yazawin Thit: 10,000 troops, 500 cavalry, 50 elephants; Hmannan: 10,000 troops, 5000 [not 500] cavalry, 50 elephants)

==== Hanthawaddy Pegu ====
Pegu Order of Battle, 13 March 1415
Unit	Commander	Strength	Reference(s)
Royal Hanthawaddy Army	Razadarit	7 regiments (6000+ troops)	(Note: Per the chronicles Maha Yazawin, Yazawin Thit, and Hmannan, the Hanthawaddy army fielded six regiments out of the seven regiments, with Binnya Dala's regiment posted outside Dala.; The Razadarit Ayedawbon gives seven regiments led by Binnya Dhammaraza, Binnya Ran, Binnya Dala, Dein Mani-Yut, Maha Thamun, Smin Awa Naing and Razadarit.; The Pak Lat gives six regiments led by Binnya Kyan, Binnya Ran, Dein Mani-Yut, Maha Thamun, Smin Awa Naing and Razadarit.)
1st Vanguard Regiment	Binnya Dhammaraza	1000+ (or 2000) troops	(Note: Chronicles report: Maha Yazawin: 2000 troops, ? cavalry, ? elephants; Yazawin Thit: 20,000 troops, ? cavalry, ? elephants; Hmannan: 11,000 troops, ? cavalry, ? elephants)
2nd Vanguard Regiment	Binnya Ran	1000+ troops	(Note: Chronicles report: Maha Yazawin: 1000+ troops, ? cavalry, ? elephants; Yazawin Thit: 10,000+ troops, ? cavalry, ? elephants; Hmannan: 1000+ troops, ? cavalry, ? elephants)
Right Flank Regiment	Dein Mani-Yut	1000+ troops	(Note: Chronicles report: Maha Yazawin: 1000+ troops, ? cavalry, ? elephants; Yazawin Thit: 10,000+ troops, ? cavalry, ? elephants; Hmannan: 100+ troops, ? cavalry, ? elephants)
Left Flank Regiment	Maha Thamun	1000+ (or 800) troops	(Note: Chronicles report: Maha Yazawin: 1000+ troops; Yazawin Thit: 10,000+ troops; Hmannan: 800 troops)
Royal Regiment	Razadarit	1100 (or 2000) troops	(Note: Chronicles report: Maha Yazawin: 2000 troops; Yazawin Thit: 20,000 troops; Hmannan: 11,000 troops)
Rearguard Regiment	Smin Awa Naing	200 (or 500) troops	(Note: Chronicles report: Maha Yazawin: 2000 troops; Yazawin Thit: 5000+ troops; Hmannan: 2000 troops)
Dala Regiment	Binnya Dala	1000+ troops	(Note: Chronicles report: Maha Yazawin: 1000 troops; Yazawin Thit: 10,000+ troops; Hmannan: 10,000 troops)

=== Siege of Fort Sayat (January–March 1415) ===
At the Siege of Fort Sayat, which took place in the east between January and March 1415, the Ava forces of 1000 troops, 50 cavalry, and 5 elephants were led by Thihathu, Thado of Mohnyin, and Tuyin Kyaw. The Pegu army, of around 500 troops, 30 cavalry, and 5 elephants, was led by Smin Byattaba. (Note: Chronicles give different figures: Maha Yazawin: 20,000 troops, 30 cavalry, 5 elephants; Yazawin Thit: 5,000 troops, 30 cavalry, 5 elephants; Hmannan: 2,000 troops, 30 cavalry, 5 elephants)

==== Ava ====
Ava Order of Battle, January–March 1415
Unit	Commander	Strength	Reference(s)
2nd Army	Prince Thihathu	1000 troops, 50 cavalry, 5 elephants	(Note: The Maha Yazawin, Yazawin Thit and Hmannan report 3 regiments (10,000 troops, 500 cavalry, 50 elephants).)
1st Regiment	Thihathu		(Note: The Maha Yazawin, Yazawin Thit and Hmannan report 3 regiments (10,000 troops, 500 cavalry, 50 elephants).)
2nd Regiment	Thado of Mohnyin		(Note: The Maha Yazawin, Yazawin Thit and Hmannan report 3 regiments (10,000 troops, 500 cavalry, 50 elephants).)
3rd Regiment	Tuyin Kyaw		(Note: The Maha Yazawin, Yazawin Thit and Hmannan report 3 regiments (10,000 troops, 500 cavalry, 50 elephants).)

==== Hanthawaddy Pegu ====
Pegu Order of Battle, January–March 1415
Unit	Commander	Strength	Reference(s)
Sayat Regiment	Smin Byattaba	~500 troops, 30 cavalry, 5 elephants	(Note: Chronicles give different figures: Maha Yazawin: 20,000 troops, 30 cavalry, 5 elephants; Yazawin Thit: 5,000 troops, 30 cavalry, 5 elephants; Hmannan: 2,000 troops, 30 cavalry, 5 elephants)

== April–May 1415 ==
During Minkhaung's invasion of April and May, the royal Ava force was commanded by King Minkhaung I, with a strike force of a navy and five regiments co-commanded by Nawrahta of Salin and Min Nyo of Kale. (Note: The Maha Yazawin and Yazawin Thit chronicles say the remaining land and naval forces were led by the lords of Salin and Kale. The) The Pegu force was led by King Razadarit, accompanied by Smin Awa Naing, Smin Sam Lek II, Binnya Dala, and Binnya Set.

=== Ava ===
Ava Order of Battle, April 1415
Unit	Commander	Strength	Reference(s)
Royal Main Army and Navy	King Minkhaung I	?	
Main Strike Force	Co-commanders: Nawrahta of Salin; Min Nyo of Kale		(Note: The Maha Yazawin and Yazawin Thit chronicles say the remaining land and naval forces were led by the lords of Salin and Kale. The)
1st Army		5 regiments	(Note: The Maha Yazawin and Yazawin Thit chronicles say the remaining land and naval forces were led by the lords of Salin and Kale. The)
Navy		?	(Note: The Maha Yazawin and Yazawin Thit chronicles say the remaining land and naval forces were led by the lords of Salin and Kale. The)

=== Hanthawaddy Pegu ===
Pegu Order of Battle, April 1415
Unit	Commander	Strength	Reference(s)
Royal Hanthawaddy Armed Forces	King Razadarit		
Bassein Corps	Smin Awa Naing		
Myaungmya Corps	Smin Sam Lek II		
Dala Regiment	Binnya Dala		
Dagon Regiment	Binnya Set		
Pegu Corps	Razadarit		

== Bibliography ==
- Fernquest, Jon (Spring 2006). "Rajadhirat's Mask of Command: Military Leadership in Burma (c. 1384–1421)" (PDF). SOAS Bulletin of Burma Research. 4 (1). Archived (PDF) from the original on 2020-03-22.
- Fernquest, Jon (Autumn 2006). "Crucible of War: Burma and the Ming in the Tai Frontier Zone (1382–1454)" (PDF). SOAS Bulletin of Burma Research. 4 (2). Archived (PDF) from the original on 2017-08-10.
- Harvey, G. E. (1925). History of Burma: From the Earliest Times to 10 March 1824. London: Frank Cass & Co. Ltd.
- Kala, U (2006) [1724]. Maha Yazawin (in Burmese). Vol. 1–3 (4th printing ed.). Yangon: Ya-Pyei Publishing.
- Lieberman, Victor B. (2014) [1984]. Burmese Administrative Cycles: Anarchy and Conquest, c. 1580–1760. Princeton University Press. ISBN 978-0-691-05407-0.
- Maha Sithu (2012) [1798]. Myint Swe; Kyaw Win; Thein Hlaing (eds.). Yazawin Thit (in Burmese). Vol. 1–3 (2nd printing ed.). Yangon: Ya-Pyei Publishing.
- Pan Hla, Nai (2005) [1968]. Razadarit Ayedawbon (in Burmese) (8th printing ed.). Yangon: Armanthit Sarpay.
- Royal Historical Commission of Burma (2003) [1832]. Hmannan Yazawin (in Burmese). Vol. 1–3. Yangon: Ministry of Information, Myanmar.
