= Maha Thamun =

Hanthawaddy minister (c. 1384–1430s)

- မဟာသမွန်

Minister of Hanthawaddy
- In office 1384?–c. 1430s
- Monarchs: Razadarit; Binnya Dhammaraza; Binnya Ran I

Personal details
- Born: Hanthawaddy kingdom
- Died: Hanthawaddy Kingdom

Military service
- Allegiance: Hanthawaddy kingdom
- Branch/service: Royal Hanthawaddy Armed Forces (Navy and Army)
- Years of service: by 1385–1415 or later
- Rank: Commander
- Battles/wars: Forty Years' War (1385–1415)

Maha Thamun (Burmese: မဟာသမွန်, Burmese pronunciation: [məhà θəmʊ̀ɰ̃]) was a senior minister of the royal court of Hanthawaddy from the 1380s to the 1430s. He also served in the Hanthawaddy armed forces for over 30 years during his kingdom's decades-long war against Ava. He twice led the Hanthawaddy delegation in peace negotiations with Ava in 1391 and in 1430–1431, and secured favorable treaties for his kingdom on both occasions.

== Brief ==
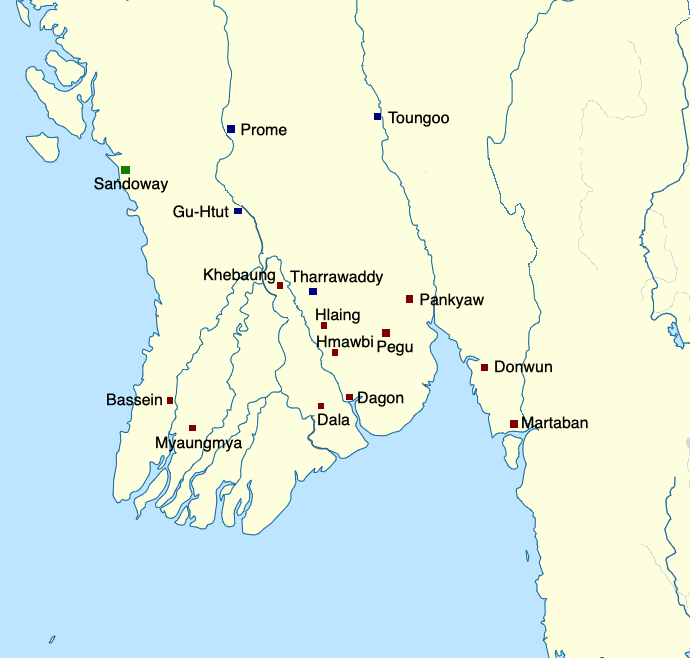
Key locations of the Ava–Hanthawaddy War (1385–1391)

Although he is best known as a longtime senior minister, the first mention of Maha Thamun in the royal chronicles is as a commander of a sentinel battalion of the Hanthawaddy army in the first campaign (1385–1386) of the Forty Years' War.

=== Peace negotiations of 1391 ===
Maha Thamun made his name in the 1390–1391 campaign. His naval flotilla was instrumental in repulsing the numerically superior Ava invasion fleet, outside the port of Gu-Htut on the Irrawaddy River, in the opening battle of the campaign. His war boats managed to swarm King Swa Saw Ke's royal war boat, and got close enough to capture the gold ornaments from the side of the royal boat itself. The battle proved to be a harbinger of things to come. Over the next few months, Hanthawaddy defenses successfully held off Ava's repeated naval and land-based attacks.

Despite the success, Maha Thamun persuaded the court and the king to sue for peace with Ava. He recommended the king to return Gu-Htut, which Hanthawaddy had occupied since 1390, in exchange for Ava's recognition of Pegu. Razadarit agreed, and appointed Maha Thamun to lead the Hanthawaddy delegation. The negotiations were successful. Faced with yet another embarrassing failure, Swa accepted the face-saving proposal that called for Pegu to return Gu-Htut and prisoners of war, and Ava to recognize Pegu. The treaty ended Swa's war against his southern neighbor, and allowed Pegu to consolidate most of its gains.

=== Scholarly minister ===
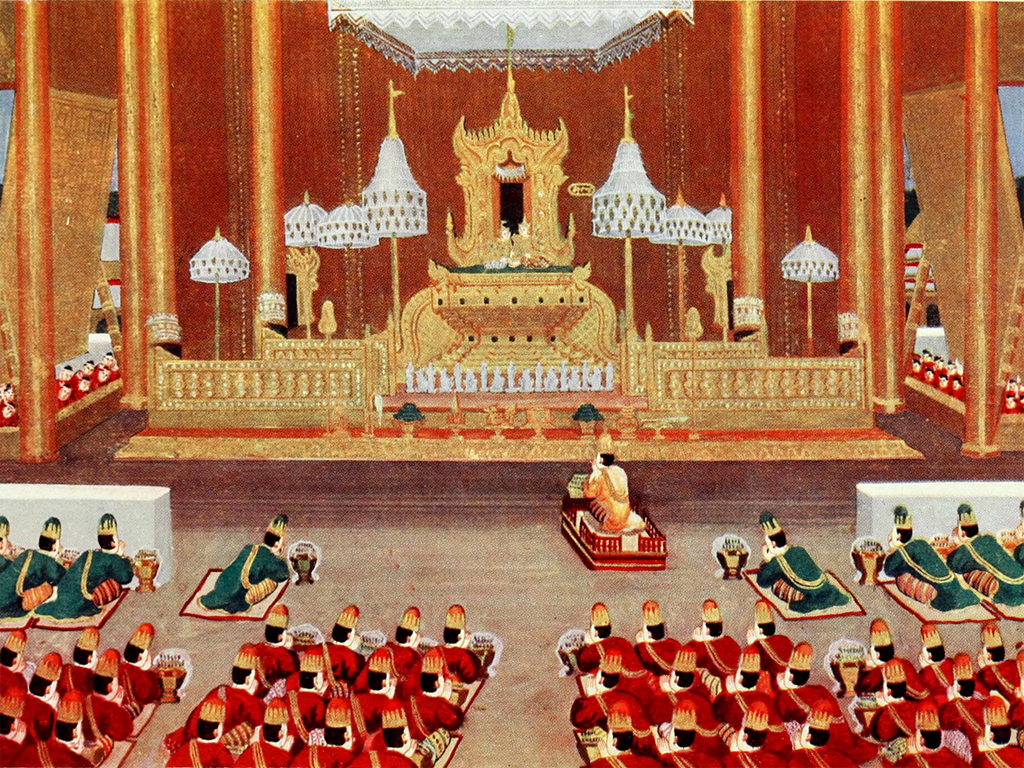
A 19th century Burmese painting depicting a royal audience with the ministers of the court

The success propelled Maha Thamun to become one of the four most senior ministers (amat-gyi, (အမတ်ကြီး)) at the Hanthawaddy court. (Note: (Pan Hla 2005: 200–201) says Maha Thamun was one of the four most senior ministers. The other three were not explicitly named but they would have been Byat Za, Dein Mani-Yut and Zeik-Bye as mentioned in earlier parts of the chronicle.) According to the historian Nai Pan Hla, Maha Thamun was an erudite, scholarly minister, known for advocating ethical conduct by those in position of power; he is said to have coined the Mon proverb that translates to "the children's conduct is a reflection of their parents'; the servants' conduct is a reflection of their lord's".

The children's conduct is a reflection of their parents'; the servants' conduct is a reflection of their lord's.

— Mon proverb attributed to Maha Thamun (Note: (Pan Hla 2005: 201, 390): In Mon: "ကောန်ကုဂွံနွံ ဖဲဒွေတ်မိမ၊ ဍိက်ကုဂွေံနွဲ့ ပဲဒွေတ်တ။". In Burmese, "မိဘအကျင့် သားကျင့်၊ သခင်အကျင့် ကျွန်ကျင့်။".)

He remained in the king's inner circle to the early 1400s. After Razadarit renewed the war in 1401, Maha Thamun went to the front with the king as an adviser. In a famous episode, he advised the king to revoke the royal order to execute the troops that had fled the battle of Nawin (which took place on 26 December 1402). (Note: (Yazawin Thit Vol. 1 2012: 220): Tuesday, 3rd waxing of Tabodwe 764 ME (26 December 1402).) He reasoned with a furious king that the responsibility for the fall of the fort laid with the bad planning by the three commanders of the Nawin fort but not with the troops. The king relented. One of the saved was Emundaya, who would become a well known commander in his own right.

His influence appeared to have waned in the following years. In 1408, he was not part of the Hanthawaddy delegation, all of whom were senior commanders, that tried to negotiate a ceasefire. (Note: (Maha Yazawin Vol. 1 2006: 340), (Yazawin Thin Vol. 1 2012: 233), (Hmannan Vol. 1 2003: 480): The Hanthawaddy delegation consisted of: (1) Byat Za, (2) Dein Mani-Yut, (3) Zeik-Bye, (4) Smin Awa Naing, (5) Smin Ye Thin Yan, (6) Smin Maw-Khwin, (7) Smin Than-Kye, (8) Smin Upakaung, (9) Smin Zeik-Pun, (10) Lagun Ein.) By 1414, he was a subordinate of minister-general Smin Awa Naing. He was part of a group of commanders and advisers led by Awa Naing that was posted at Dala–Twante to defend the key fort. As the chronicle story goes, Dala had been under siege for months in February 1415 when Commander Emundaya managed to slip through Ava lines to inform the starving forces inside the town that help was on the way, and to hold on for a few more weeks. (Note: How Emundaya slipped in and out of Ava lines is a legendary tale still retold to date. According to the chronicles (Maha Yazawin Vol. 2 2006: 40–42), (Yazawin Thit Vol. 1 2012: 255–256), (Hmannan Vol. 2 2003: 33–35), Emundaya pretended to have defected to the Ava side near the Dala front. He then managed to get on a front line patrol before making a rush to the Dala side. He informed the Dala leadership about the upcoming help. He then left Dala by acting as a corpse tied to a raft on the river, which slipped through Ava patrols. He made it back to Pegu unharmed.) In his last known command as reported in the chronicles, on 13 March 1415, Maha Thamun led an 800-man regiment in the famous battle outside Dala in which Crown Prince Minye Kyawswa of Ava fell in action.

=== Peace negotiations of 1430–1431 ===
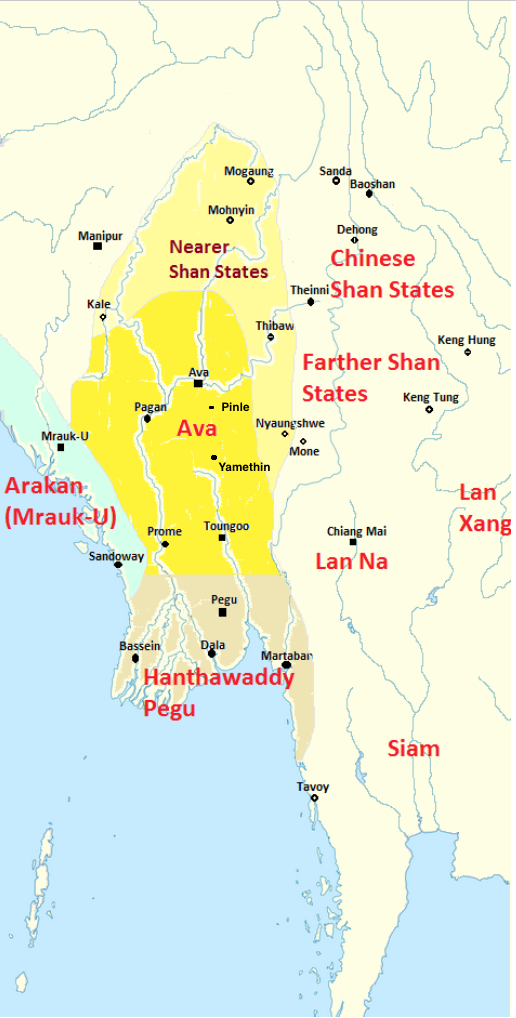
Political map of Burma c. 1440

Maha Thamun continued to serve at the Hanthawaddy royal court into the 1430s. In late 1430, King Binnya Ran I sent the old minister to Ava (Inwa) to present his terms to King Thado of Ava. Ran's main demand was for Thado to acknowledge his 1427 annexation of Tharrawaddy and Paungde, which used to be Ava's southernmost districts. Thado was so angry at the demand that he reflexively ordered Maha Thamun to be executed; Chief Minister Yazathingyan had to talk him out of it. The negotiations stalled for three months (until after 27 January 1431) (Note: (Maha Yazawin Vol. 2 2006: 67) and (Hmannan Vol. 2 2003: 69): after the completion of the Yadana Zedi pagoda on Saturday, Full Moon of Tabaung 792 ME (Saturday, 27 January 1431).) but Thado ultimately agreed to most of Ran's initial terms. Following the negotiations in Ava, Thado and Ran met outside Prome (Pyay); Thado formally ceded Tharrawaddy and Paungde, and sent Princess Soe Min Wimala Dewi, a niece of the late King Minkhaung I of Ava, to Ran, in a marriage of state. The only concession by Ran was to withdraw his support of Toungoo, a rebel vassal state of Ava. Maha Thamun is not mentioned in the chronicles again.

== Military service ==
The following is a list of military campaigns in which Maha Thamun is explicitly mentioned as a commander in the royal chronicles. All of the campaigns were part of the Forty Years' War.

Campaign	Troops commanded	Notes
1385–1386	?	Commander of a sentinel battalion, who reported Ava army movements to King Razadarit prior to the battle of Pankyaw in 1386.
1390–1391	1 flotilla (~1250 troops)	Commanded one of the four naval flotillas (carrying a total of 5000 troops) that guarded the port of Gu-Htut. The other three flotillas were led by Smin Pun-Si, Smin E-Kaung-Pein, Smin Bya-Paik. Maha Thamun's flotilla drove back Ava's main flotilla led by King Swa Saw Ke himself, even capturing gold ornaments from the royal war boat. Later led the peace negotiations with Ava that resulted in a peace treaty.
1401–1402	None	Not listed as one of the commanders but was with Razadarit after the battle of Nawin in December 1402
1414–1415	800 troops	Part of the senior ministers assigned to assist Prince Binnya Dala in Dala; served under the command of Smin Awa Naing. In March, in the battle of Dala, Maha Thamun marched with 800 troops from the left side of the main army led by Razadarit; Dein marched with 1000 troops from the right; followed by Awa Naing with 500 troops.

== Bibliography ==
- Aung-Thwin, Michael A. (2017). Myanmar in the Fifteenth Century. Honolulu: University of Hawai'i Press. ISBN 978-0-8248-6783-6.
- Harvey, G. E. (1925). History of Burma: From the Earliest Times to 10 March 1824. London: Frank Cass & Co. Ltd.
- Kala, U (2006) [1724]. Maha Yazawin (in Burmese). Vol. 1–3 (4th printing ed.). Yangon: Ya-Pyei Publishing.
- Maha Sithu (2012) [1798]. Myint Swe; Kyaw Win; Thein Hlaing (eds.). Yazawin Thit (in Burmese). Vol. 1–3 (2nd printing ed.). Yangon: Ya-Pyei Publishing.
- Pan Hla, Nai (2005) [1968]. Razadarit Ayedawbon (in Burmese) (8th printing ed.). Yangon: Armanthit Sarpay.
- Royal Historical Commission of Burma (2003) [1832]. Hmannan Yazawin (in Burmese). Vol. 1–3. Yangon: Ministry of Information, Myanmar.
