= Smin Paik-Nye =

- သၟိင် ဗိုတ်ညာတ်
- Military career
- Allegiance: Royal Hanthawaddy Armed Forces
- Rank: Commander
- Conflicts: Hanthawaddy invasion of Arakan (1408); Battle of Dala (1414–1415)

Smin Paik-Nye (Mon: သၟိင် ဗိုတ်ညာတ်, Burmese: သမိန် ပိုက်ညဲ or သမိန် ဗိုက်ညဲ, Burmese pronunciation: [θəmèiɴ baiʔ ɲɛ́]) was a Hanthawaddy commander. He is best known for his key role in the successful Hanthawaddy 1408 invasion of Launggyet Arakan, which started the Ava–Hanthawaddy War (1408–1418). He was one of the commanders that resisted Crown Prince Minye Kyawswa's Ava forces during the siege of Dala.

== Military service ==
The following is a list of military campaigns in which Paik-Nye is explicitly mentioned in the royal chronicles as a commander.

Campaign	Duration	Troops commanded (Note: Chronicle reported troop levels reduced by an order of magnitude per (Harvey 1925: 333–336))	Notes
Hanthawaddy invasion of Arakan	March 1408	2000+ troops	Co-led the invasion alongside Smin Maw-Khwin (Note: While all chronicles state Smin Maw-Khwin was one of the two main commanders of the invasion, they differ on the operational details: The Razadarit Ayedawbon says the invasion comprised two armies, each with 5000 troops, "several" cavalry and elephants. Smin Paik-Nye and Smin Maw-Khwin commanded the first and second armies, respectively. It does not mention Byat Za or Dein as part of the expeditionary force.; The Maha Yazawin says the overall strike force consisted of 40,000 troops and 300 elephants, and the commander-in-chief was Gen. Byat Za.; The Yazawin Thit gives the overall strength as 40,000 troops and 200 elephants.; The Hmannan Yazawin provides the strength of the overall strike force as 40,000 troops and 100 elephants, commanded by Byat Za.; The Rakhine Razawin Thit says 50,000 troops, and names Dein Mani-Yut as the commander-in-chief. Smin Maw-Khwin remained in Launggyet with a Hanthawaddy regiment after Min Khayi was placed on the Launggyet throne.)
Defense of Pegu capital region	1413	400+ troops	Commanded the Za-ywe-ohn Regiment
Battle of Dala	December 1414–March 1415	?	One of the military advisers to Prince Binnya Dala, alongside Smin Awa Naing, Maha Thamun, Smin Sithu and Smin Sam Lek.

== Bibliography ==
- Fernquest, Jon (Spring 2006). "Rajadhirat's Mask of Command: Military Leadership in Burma (c. 1384–1421)" (PDF). SOAS Bulletin of Burma Research. 4 (1). Archived (PDF) from the original on 2020-03-22.
- Harvey, G. E. (1925). History of Burma: From the Earliest Times to 10 March 1824. London: Frank Cass & Co. Ltd.
- Kala, U (2006) [1724]. Maha Yazawin (in Burmese). Vol. 1–3 (4th printing ed.). Yangon: Ya-Pyei Publishing.
- Maha Sithu (2012) [1798]. Myint Swe; Kyaw Win; Thein Hlaing (eds.). Yazawin Thit (in Burmese). Vol. 1–3 (2nd printing ed.). Yangon: Ya-Pyei Publishing.
- Pan Hla, Nai (2005) [1968]. Razadarit Ayedawbon (in Burmese) (8th printing ed.). Yangon: Armanthit Sarpay.
- Royal Historical Commission of Burma (2003) [1832]. Hmannan Yazawin (in Burmese). Vol. 1–3. Yangon: Ministry of Information, Myanmar.
- Sandamala Linkara, Ashin (1997–1999) [1931]. Rakhine Razawin Thit (in Burmese). Vol. 1–2. Yangon: Tetlan Sarpay.
