= Smin Maw-Khwin =

15th-century Burmese military commander

Smin: သၟိင် မုဟ်ဂွင်; သၟိင် ငဝ်ခွင်

Governor of Sayat
- In office ? – c. October 1414
- Monarch: Razadarit
- Preceded by: ?
- Succeeded by: ?

Personal details
- Born: ? Hanthawaddy kingdom
- Died: ? Ava Kingdom

Military service
- Allegiance: Hanthawaddy kingdom
- Branch/service: Royal Hanthawaddy Armed Forces
- Years of service: 1390–1414
- Rank: Commander
- Unit: Army, Navy
- Battles/wars: Ava–Hanthawaddy War (1385–1391); Ava–Hanthawaddy War (1401–1403); Ava–Hanthawaddy War (1408–1418) (to 1414)

Smin Maw-Khwin (Mon: သၟိင် မုဟ်ဂွင် or သၟိင် ငဝ်ခွင်, (Note: Nai Pan Hla's edition of the Razadarit Ayedawbon chronicle provides two Mon language spellings: "သၟိင် မုဟ်ဂွင်", and "သၟိင် ငဝ်ခွင်". Per Pan Hla, "သၟိင် ငဝ်ခွင်" transliterates into Burmese as "သမိန် ငေါခွင်".) Burmese: သမိန် မောခွင်, Burmese pronunciation: [θəmèiɰ̃ mɔ́ gwɪ̀ɰ̃]; also spelled Thamein Mawhkwin or Thamein Mawkhwin) was a Hanthawaddy commander who participated in the first three wars of the Forty Years' War until 1414. He also served as governor of Sayat. He is best known for his key role in the successful 1408 Hanthawaddy invasion of Launggyet Arakan, which started the decade-long Ava–Hanthawaddy War (1408–1418). The commander was captured by Ava forces in 1414.

At least two other commanders held the title of Smin Maw-Khwin in the Hanthawaddy military between 1414 and 1422.

== Biography ==
The name Smin Maw-Khwin is a Mon language title, conferred upon several commanders who served the monarchs of Hanthawaddy Pegu and the First Toungoo Empire.

This Smin Maw-Khwin is first mentioned in the royal chronicles in 1390. He served as a regimental commander in King Razadarit's main army during the Ava–Hanthawaddy War (1385–1391). He is also noted as a regimental commander during the second siege of Prome in late 1402, part of the Ava–Hanthawaddy War (1401–1403).

=== Arakan campaign (1408) ===
Maw-Khwin is best known for his role in the 1408 Hanthawaddy invasion of Arakan, then a vassal state of Ava. Chronicles provide conflicting accounts of his activities during and after the invasion. The Razadarit Ayedawbon and Yazawin Thit chronicles state that Maw-Khwin and Smin Paik-Nye led the successful invasion. However, other chronicles name Byat Za or Dein Mani-Yut as the theater commander-in-chief whom Maw-Khwin and Paik-Nye reported to. (Note: While all chronicles state Smin Maw-Khwin was one of the two main commanders of the invasion, they differ on the operational details: The Razadarit Ayedawbon says the invasion comprised two armies, each with 5000 troops, "several" cavalry and elephants. Smin Paik-Nye and Smin Maw-Khwin commanded the first and second armies, respectively. It does not mention Byat Za or Dein as part of the expeditionary force.; The Maha Yazawin says the overall strike force consisted of 40,000 troops and 300 elephants, and the commander-in-chief was Gen. Byat Za.; The Yazawin Thit gives the overall strength as 40,000 troops and 200 elephants.; The Hmannan Yazawin provides the strength of the overall strike force as 40,000 troops and 100 elephants, commanded by Byat Za.; The Rakhine Razawin Thit says 50,000 troops, and names Dein Mani-Yut as the commander-in-chief. Smin Maw-Khwin remained in Launggyet with a Hanthawaddy regiment after Min Khayi was placed on the Launggyet throne.) Furthermore, the Rakhine Razawin Thit chronicle states that Maw-Khwin remained with the Hanthawaddy garrison in Launggyet until later that year before being driven out by an Ava army led by the lord of Myinsaing. Other chronicles, however, say that Maw-Khwin immediately returned to Pegu, and took command of a regiment in the main Hanthawaddy army that defended the Pegu capital region during the rainy season of 1408.

=== Sittaung front (1414) ===
The war was still raging in 1414. By then, Maw-Khwin was governor of Sayat (စရပ်), (Note: In (Fernquest Spring 2006: 19), citing San Lwin's translation of the Razadarit Ayedawbon, the fort's name is transliterated as "Salat". This may be a mistranslation or based on a Mon language spelling/pronunciation. The Burmese spelling in the main chronicles is "စရပ်" (which can be transliterated as Sayat or Zayat). Furthermore, the main chronicles do not say when he became governor.) a fortified town on the Sittaung front near the northern border with Ava. From this post, he was assigned to lead the defense of the Sittaung front.

When Ava forces invaded the Irrawaddy delta in October 1414, King Razadarit ordered him to attack Toungoo (Taungoo) to relieve pressure on the delta front. As his forces marched north, they were intercepted by Ava forces from Toungoo. Hanthawaddy forces won the initial engagement, after which both sides retired to camps on the opposite sides of the Sittaung river. The next morning at dawn, Hanthawaddy war boats attempted to assault the Ava camp but their war boats were punctured by concealed underwater stakes. Maw-Khwin was captured during the battle while his deputy Saw Paik was killed in action.

This Smin Maw-Khwin is not mentioned again in the chronicles. His title was succeeded by the acting commander of Bassein (Pathein), who surrendered to Ava forces shortly after, c. December 1414. By 1422, another commander had succeeded the title. That Smin Maw-Khwin, commander of the Dala garrison, was executed by Prince Binnya Kyan during the 1422 Pegu succession crisis.

== Military service ==
The following is a list of military campaigns in which Maw-Khwin is explicitly mentioned in the chronicles as a commander.

Campaign	Duration	Troops commanded (Note: Chronicle reported troop levels reduced by an order of magnitude per (Harvey 1925: 333–336))	Notes
Defense of Hanthawaddy	1390–1391	1000	Part of Razadarit's main royal army (8 regiments, 8000 infantry, 40 elephants)
Second siege of Prome	1402	1 marine regiment	Part of the invasion fleet (7000 troops, 200 armored war boats)
Hanthawaddy invasion of Arakan	March 1408	2000+ troops	Co-led the invasion alongside Smin Paik-Nye
Defense of the Pegu capital region	April–August 1408	1 regiment	Commanded a regiment in Razadarit's main army, and participated in the counterattack
Hanthawaddy attack on Toungoo	October 1414	not mentioned	Captured in the battle of Pannin en route to Toungoo

== Bibliography ==
- Fernquest, Jon (Spring 2006). "Rajadhirat's Mask of Command: Military Leadership in Burma (c. 1384–1421)" (PDF). SOAS Bulletin of Burma Research. 4 (1). Archived (PDF) from the original on 2020-03-22.
- Harvey, G. E. (1925). History of Burma: From the Earliest Times to 10 March 1824. London: Frank Cass & Co. Ltd.
- Kala, U (2006) [1724]. Maha Yazawin (in Burmese). Vol. 1–3 (4th printing ed.). Yangon: Ya-Pyei Publishing.
- Maha Sithu (2012) [1798]. Myint Swe; Kyaw Win; Thein Hlaing (eds.). Yazawin Thit (in Burmese). Vol. 1–3 (2nd printing ed.). Yangon: Ya-Pyei Publishing.
- Myanmar Historical Commission Conference Proceedings. Vol. 3. Yangon: Myanmar Historical Commission, Golden Jubilee Publication Committee. 2005.
- Pan Hla, Nai (2005) [1968]. Razadarit Ayedawbon (in Burmese) (8th printing ed.). Yangon: Armanthit Sarpay.
- Royal Historical Commission of Burma (2003) [1832]. Hmannan Yazawin (in Burmese). Vol. 1–3. Yangon: Ministry of Information, Myanmar.
- Sandamala Linkara, Ashin (1997–1999) [1931]. Rakhine Razawin Thit (in Burmese). Vol. 1–2. Yangon: Tetlan Sarpay.
