= Zeik-Bye =

Smin E Bya-Ye Zeik-Bye အဲပြရဲ ဇိပ်ဗြဲ

Senior Minister of Hanthawaddy
- In office 1388 – 1408 (or c. 1415)
- Monarch: Razadarit

Governor of Sittaung
- In office c. 1370s – c. 1415
- Monarchs: Binnya U Razadarit
- Preceded by: Annara?
- Succeeded by: Dein Mani-Yut

Chief Minister of Hanthawaddy
- In office by 1383–1388
- Monarchs: Binnya U Razadarit
- Preceded by: Pun-So?
- Succeeded by: Dein Mani-Yut and Byat Za

Personal details
- Born: in or before 1323 Martaban Kingdom
- Died: c. 1415 Hanthawaddy kingdom
- Children: Mi Kha-Dun-Mut; Mi Hpyun-Gyo
- Profession: Minister–general

Military service
- Allegiance: Hanthawaddy kingdom
- Branch/service: Royal Hanthawaddy Armed Forces
- Years of service: by 1360s–1408
- Rank: General
- Commands: Army
- Battles/wars: Forty Years' War

Smin E Bya-Ye Zeik-Bye (Mon: သ္ငီ အဲာပြရဲာ ဇိပ်ဗြဲာ; Burmese: သမိန် အဲပြရဲ ဇိပ်ဗြဲ, Burmese pronunciation: [θəmèiɴ ʔɛ́ bə jɛ́ zeiʔ bjɛ́]; also spelled Zeip Bye) was chief minister of Hanthawaddy in the 1380s in the service of kings Binnya U and Razadarit. He was a key figure responsible for Razadarit's ascent to power. Though he lost the chief ministership to Byat Za and Dein Mani-Yut in 1388, Zeik-Bye continued to serve as a senior minister at least until 1408.

== Background ==
The Razadarit Ayedawbon chronicle includes two men who wore the title Smin Zeik-Bye in the service of King Binnya U (r. 1348–1384). The subject of this article is the man who became chief minister in the second half of the king's reign, not Gov. Smin Zeik-Bye of Dala–Twante, who died c. 1371.

The chronicle does not provide any direct information about the minister's background. It can be inferred from the language used in the chronicle that the minister was of the same generation as King Binnya U (b. 1323), and was likely related to the royal family. (Note: The chronicle Razadarit Ayedawbon (Pan Hla 2005: 137) says Prince Binnya Nwe addressed Zeik-Bye as A-Shin Bagyidaw (lit. "Lord Royal Paternal Elder Uncle"). This suggests that Zeik-Bye was older than Binnya U; not of commoner descent; and probably related to the king. Per (Aung-Thwin 1985: 130–131), senior court officials were usually drawn from different (more distant) branches of the royal family.)

== Royal service of Binnya U ==
=== Chief minister ===
The first unambiguous mention of Zeik-Bye the chief minister in the Razadarit Ayedawbon chronicle is when he was already chief minister c. 1382/83. (According to Nai Pan Hla, he was governor of Taikkala and one of the most trusted senior officers of King Binnya U in the 1360s. (Note: The Razadarit (Pan Hla 2005: 49) only says Gov. Smin Zeik-Bye of Taikkala was one of the five generals who accompanied the king on a months long hunting trip in 725 ME (1363/64). The editor Nai Pan Hla (Pan Hla 2005: 378) identifies the governor of Taikkala as the Zeik-Bye that became chief minister but does not explain how he arrived at the conclusion. His conjecture may have been based on the fact that Taikkala is located immediately south of Sittaung, the fief of Zeik-Bye the chief minister. In order for this conjecture to be true, however, two men with the same title Smin Zeik-Bye needed to have existed contemporaneously since the chronicle (Pan Hla 2005: 60) says Smin Zeik-Bye of Dala died only c. 1371.)) Nonetheless, his influence as chief minister was limited. Binnya U was in ill health, and the real power belonged to Princess Maha Dewi of Dagon. The king had relied on his elder sister for advice since the death of Chief Minister Pun-So in 1369. Zeik-Bye was not part of Maha Dewi's inner circle; she was closely allied with her nephew-in-law and alleged lover Smin Maru.

=== Aiding Binnya Nwe's rebellion ===
Zeik-Bye responded by quietly undermining her power. He plotted to put Prince Binnya Nwe, the king's eldest son and Maha Dewi's adopted son, on the throne, and marry his two young daughters to the prince. The prince had been deeply unhappy that his father had chosen another, younger, son to be the heir-apparent. In 1383, the minister persuaded the 15-year-old prince that Maha Dewi was planning to put her lover Maru on the throne, and that he would fully support a rebellion by Nwe.

The minister kept his end of the bargain. When Nwe fled to Dagon with 30 men to raise a rebellion in May 1383, Zeik-Bye stalled the princess and the court for the next five months, allowing Nwe to garner support amongst local governors around Dagon. When Maha Dewi finally ordered an expedition to Dagon in October, Zeik-Bye led the rearguard army, and undermined the attack. When Binnya U died in January 1384, he found enough support in the court to hand the power to Nwe. Nwe ascended the throne with the title of Razadarit.

== Razadarit years ==
=== Chief minister ===
Zeik-Bye served the new king's chief minister for the next four years. He also became the new king's father-in-law as he gave his two daughters, Mi Kha-Dun-Mut and Mi Hpyun-Gyo, in marriage to the king. Nonetheless, his influence on the young king was never great. Even at the beginning, Razadarit knew that he needed more than the Zeik-Bye faction of the court, (Note: (Pan Hla 2005: 152): Smin Yawga-Rat and Smin Ye Thin Yan were allied with Zeik-Bye.) and did not punish the factions that did not support him during his rebellion. In the following years, the young king, who faced several internal and external threats, valued court ministers who could also take the field. Zeik-Bye, who was already in his 60s, did not go the front in any of the campaigns between 1385 and 1391 against the northern Ava Kingdom and the rebel forces of Martaban and Myaungmya. (Note: Zeik-Bye is not mentioned as a commander in any of the campaigns between 1385 and 1391.) By 1388, two ministers Dein Mani-Yut and Byat Za, who had proved themselves as successful commanders, had overtaken Zeik-Bye as the chief advisers of the king.

=== Senior minister ===
Nonetheless, Zeik-Bye remained one of the four senior ministers. He was part of the embassy led by Byat Za and Dein to Siam to receive a white elephant for Razadarit presented by the king of Ayutthaya in the early 1390s. In 1401, when Razadarit invaded Ava, Zeik-Bye was entrusted to govern the capital Pegu in the king's absence. Furthermore, although he had not gone to the front since 1383, he remained part of the Pegu high command. In 1402, he supported the king's position to maintain the siege of Prome (Pyay) while the king's co-chief ministers Byat Za and Dein recommended an immediate withdrawal. Zeik-Bye, who was at least 79, took command of the garrison at Nawin, south of Prome. But it was a complete disaster. Larger Ava forces not only broke the siege but also sacked Nawin. All three regiments defending the garrison were lost; Zeik-Bye himself was captured.

Zeik-Bye was returned to Pegu after Ava and Pegu signed a peace treaty in 1403. He received a new title, Smin E Bya-Ye but his influence had greatly diminished. The Razadarit Ayedawbon includes an episode in which the king made him contribute to the war effort financially. In 1408, Razadarit told the minister, who held the town of Sittaung in fief, that unless he "lent" funds to the royal coffers, the royal army would not defend the town. His only other choice was to defend the town on his own. After protesting that he was too old to fight, the minister "lent" 7 viss (11.43 kg) of gold to the king, and 1 viss (1.63 kg) of gold to the army. At least to that year, he remained part of the Pegu high command. (Note: (Pan Hla 2005: 253): The Pegu high command in 1408 were: Byat Za, Dein, Smin Awa Naing, E Bya Ye Zeik Bye.)

Chronicles do not say when he died but he was most likely dead by 1415. That year, Razadarit appointed Dein governor of Sittaung, Zeik-Bye's fief.

== List of campaigns ==
The following is a list of Zeik-Bye's military campaigns. Although he was part of the high command at least until 1408, chronicles report that he went to the front only twice between 1383 and 1408. (Note: He went to the front in 1383 and 1402. The Razadarit Ayedawbon chronicle (Pan Hla 2005: 277) says that one Smin E Bya-Ye went to the Prome front in 1412 as the deputy commander of the overall invasion force. But the Yazawin Thit chronicle (Yazawin Thit Vol. 1 2012: 239) says that the commander's name was E-Ba-Ye, a different commander with a similar title. The Razadarit (Pan Hla 2005: 244) does report a field commander named Smin E Hpa-Ye in the same period. Given that the minister would have been at least 89 in 1412, and that he refused to take command in 1408 per (Pan Hla 2005: 245–246), the old minister probably was not the deputy commander.)

Campaign	Duration	Troops commanded	Notes
Expedition to Dagon	1383	1 regiment	Commanded the rearguard regiment
Forty Years' War: Fourth Campaign; Pegu invasion of Ava	1401–1403	1 army	Remained at Pegu to defend the capital during the invasion of Ava (1401–1402); Went to the Prome front but was defeated at the battle of Nawin and captured by Ava forces on 26 December 1402

== Bibliography ==
- Aung-Thwin, Michael (1985). Pagan: The Origins of Modern Burma. Honolulu: University of Hawai'i Press. ISBN 0-8248-0960-2.
- Aung-Thwin, Michael A. (2017). Myanmar in the Fifteenth Century. Honolulu: University of Hawai'i Press. ISBN 978-0-8248-6783-6.
- Fernquest, Jon (Spring 2006). "Rajadhirat's Mask of Command: Military Leadership in Burma (c. 1348–1421)" (PDF). SBBR. 4 (1). Archived from the original (PDF) on 2019-08-01.
- Harvey, G. E. (1925). History of Burma: From the Earliest Times to 10 March 1824. London: Frank Cass & Co. Ltd.
- Kala, U (2006) [1724]. Maha Yazawin (in Burmese). Vol. 1–3 (4th printing ed.). Yangon: Ya-Pyei Publishing.
- Maha Sithu (2012) [1798]. Kyaw Win; Thein Hlaing (eds.). Yazawin Thit (in Burmese). Vol. 1–3 (2nd printing ed.). Yangon: Ya-Pyei Publishing.
- Pan Hla, Nai (2005) [1968]. Razadarit Ayedawbon (in Burmese) (8th printing ed.). Yangon: Armanthit Sarpay.
- Royal Historical Commission of Burma (2003) [1832]. Hmannan Yazawin (in Burmese). Vol. 1–3. Yangon: Ministry of Information, Myanmar.
