= Smin Awa Naing =

- သမိန် အဝနိုင်

Senior Minister of the Pegu Court
- In office by 1408 – 1424?
- Monarchs: Razadarit; Binnya Dhammaraza?

Personal details
- Born: late 1360s or early 1370s Hanthawaddy kingdom
- Died: Unknown Hanthawaddy kingdom
- Spouse: unnamed
- Children: Mi Ta-Lat

Military service
- Allegiance: Hanthawaddy kingdom
- Branch/service: Royal Hanthawaddy Army
- Years of service: 1401–1424?
- Rank: General
- Battles/wars: Forty Years' War

Smin Awa Naing Min Thiri (Burmese: သမိန် အဝနိုင် မင်းသီရိ, Burmese pronunciation: [θəmèiɰ̃ ʔəwa̰ nàiɰ̃ míɰ̃ θìɹḭ]; also spelled Thamein Inwa Naing (သမိန် အင်းဝနိုင်, lit. "Lord of Victory over Ava"); also known as Awa Mingyi (အဝ မင်းကြီး, lit. "Great Lord of Ava")) was an early 15th-century senior Hanthawaddy court official and military commander. A trusted adviser of King Razadarit, Awa Naing is best remembered in Burmese history for the 1415 battle of Dala–Twante in which his undermanned regiment mortally wounded Crown Prince Minye Kyawswa of Ava.

He was the father of Queen Mi Ta-Lat, a principal consort of King Binnya Dhammaraza.

== Background ==
The royal chronicles say nothing explicitly about his background. However, since King Minkhaung I of Ava addressed him as the "royal elder brother, royal in-law", (Note: (Maha Yazawin Vol. 2 2006: 53), (Yazawin Thit Vol. 2 2012: 263) and (Hmannan Vol. 2 2003: 48): King Minkhaung I addressed Awa Naing as (နောင်တော်၊ ခမက်တော်; naungdaw, khamettaw, "royal elder brother", "royal in-law"). (Hmannan Vol. 2 2003: 48) adds an explanation for the "royal in-law" part: Awa Naing's daughter Mi Ta-Lat was married to Razadarit's son Binnya Dhammaraza.) it can be inferred that Awa Naing was older than but of the same generation as Minkhaung (b. 1373), and likely hailed from a branch of the Martaban–Hanthawaddy royal family. The first explicit mention of his three known names/titles (Awa/Inwa Naing, Awa/Inwa Mingyi, Min Thiri) (Note: "Awa Naing" was a title, meaning "Victory over Ava". It was not the only aspirational title given by Razadarit. Per (Pan Hla 2005: 205): the invasion force also included another commander with the title "Awa Mingyi" (အဝ မင်းကြီး, lit. "Great Lord of Ava"). (Pan Hla 2005: 319, footnote 3): The man best known as Awa Naing was also known as Awa Mingyi and Min Thiri.) in the chronicles is when one Smin Awa Naing sailed up the Irrawaddy River with the Hanthawaddy armed forces that invaded the Ava Kingdom in 1401. He later received the title of "Awa Mingyi" (အဝ မင်းကြီး, lit. "Great Lord of Ava") in 1408 for his success in disrupting Ava's supply lines.

== Career ==
Awa Naing Min Thiri served both as a commander and as a court official during King Razadarit's reign from 1401 onwards. He was one of the few commanders the king trusted to defend the Mon-speaking kingdom's key defensive positions en route to the capital Pegu (Bago). It was Awa Naing that successfully withstood Ava's most fierce attacks of the war at Dala–Twante (1414–1415), Bassein (Pathein) (1415) and Syriam (Thanlyin) (1417–1418). Furthermore, he was already a senior minister at the court by 1408. (Note: He was either third or fourth ranked minister at the court in 1408. According to the Razadarit Ayedawbon (Pan Hla 2005: 253), Byat Za, Dein, Awa Naing, Zeik-Bye were the ones Razadarit consulted in 1408. Per (Maha Yazawin Vol. 1 2006: 336), the ranking was: (1) Byat Za, (2) Dein, (3) Zeik-Bye, (4) Awa Naing.)

=== Battle of Dala (1414–1415) ===
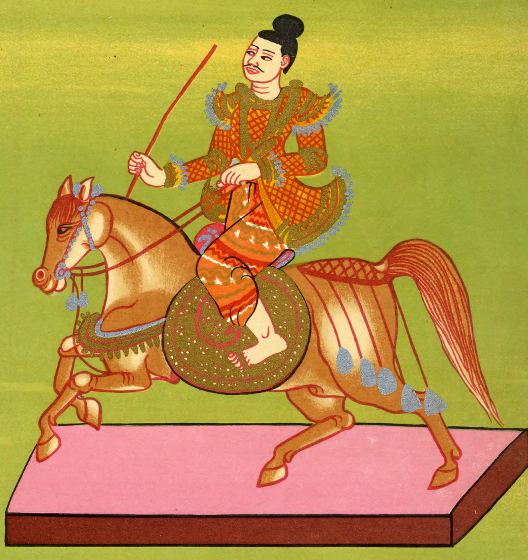
Crown Prince Minye Kyawswa, who fell in action in 1415

Awa Naing is best known for the battle of Dala that culminated in March 1415. He had led the defense of the city since the start of Ava's dry season offensive in late 1414; indeed, his defenses were teetering on the brink of collapse until Hanthawaddy relief forces broke the siege in early March. (Note: (Yazawin Thit Vol. 1 2012: 256): A few days after 2 March 1415 (8th waning of Tabaung 776 ME)) This set up the famous battle outside the city. On 13 March 1415, Ava forces returned with Crown Prince Minye Kyawswa himself leading the charge. Razadarit fielded a sizable force to meet the enemy. Awa Naing's small regiment (300 or 500 troops) marched close to Razadarit's main army and behind three vanguard regiments led by the king's three sons. The battle came to him. Minye Kyawswa on his favorite war elephant broke through the vanguard forces, forcing Razadarit himself to retreat. Awa Naing however saw that the crown prince had advanced too far ahead of his supporting troops, and ordered his troops to engage the crown prince. Awa Naing's troops subsequently managed to take down both the crown prince and his exhausted elephant. Minye Kyawswa died shortly after.

Awa Naing instantly became a high value target for the Ava command. In April, (Note: (Maha Yazawin Vol. 2 2006: 52), (Yazawin Thit Vol. 1 2012: 262): After the new year had turned.) Ava forces led by King Minkhaung himself rampaged through the Irrawaddy delta and showed up before the fortified city of Bassein (Pathein) (Note: All the main chronicles (Maha Yazawin Vol. 2 2003: 53–54), (Yazawin Thit Vol. 1 2012: 263) and (Hmannan Vol. 2 2003: 48) as well as the Burmese version of the Razadarit Ayedawbon (Pan Hla 2005: 319, footnote 4) say Awa Naing was reassigned to defend Bassein. However, the Pak Lat chronicle, which (Pan Hla 2005: 319) calls the "Mon version", says Awa Naing was reassigned to defend Syriam.) where Awa Naing had been reassigned to. But with the rainy season fast approaching, Minkhaung asked for a meeting with Awa Naing, who accepted. However, the meeting did not take place as Awa Naing came under an unauthorized assassination attempt as he came out of the gate. A servant of Prince Minye Kyawhtin, eldest son of the late Minye Kyawswa, threw a spear at Awa Naing but it fell short. A furious and embarrassed Minkhaung sent the servant to Awa Naing, who ultimately spared the servant's life. (Note: (Maha Yazawin Vol. 2 2003: 53–54), (Yazawin Thit Vol. 1 2012: 263) and (Hmannan Vol. 2 2003: 49–50): Furious and embarrassed by the assassination attempt, Minkhaung asked his grandson if he had ordered the assassination. When Minye Kyawhtin replied that he had not, the king sent the servant to Awa Naing. Inside the city, Awa Naing questioned the servant as to why; the servant replied that he wanted to avenge for Minye Kyawswa's death. Awa Naing respected the servant's bravery and authenticity, and spared his life.) The king of Ava later sent presents to Awa Naing, and withdrew his forces from the delta altogether.

=== Aftermath ===
Minye Kyawswa's death ended what turned out to be Ava's most serious threat to Pegu and the height of the war. The war did continue listlessly for the next few years. Awa Naing again proved his defensive prowess in the 1417–1418 dry season when he successfully defended Syriam (Thanlyin). The campaign was not only the last campaign during the reigns of kings Razadarit and Minkhaung but also the last mention of Awa Naing in the chronicles. His name is conspicuously absent from the chronicles' list of figures who took part in the succession crisis, following Razadarit's sudden death in 1421. While Prince Binnya Dhammaraza, who was married to Awa Naing's daughter Mi Ta-Lat, emerged as king, it is unclear if Awa Naing was still alive or played any role in his son-in-law's regime.

== Military service ==
The following is a list of military campaigns in which Smin Awa Naing, Awa Mingyi or Min Thiri is explicitly mentioned as a commander in the royal chronicles. All of the campaigns were part of the Forty Years' War.

| Campaign | Troops commanded | Notes |
|---|---|---|
| 1401–1402 | 1 naval squadron (1401–1402); 1 infantry regiment (1402) | Commanded a squadron of boats the riverine invasion flotilla (total strength: 4000 to 7000 troops) that sailed up the Irrawaddy and blockaded Ava in 1401. Commanded a small regiment in the battle of Thawutti in 1402; served alongside Lagun Ein under the overall command of Gen. Byat Za. |
| 1408 | various | Part of the 8000-strong army that defended Shwegyin at the start of the campaign. Later led a small force (200 to 300 troops) that ambushed Ava's supply lines. Awarded the upgraded title of "Smin Awa Mingyi". Member of the Pegu delegation in the failed ceasefire negotiation: (1) Byat Za, (2) Dein Mani-Yut, (3) Zeik-Bye, (4) Smin Awa Naing, (5) Smin Ye Thin Yan, (6) Smin Maw-Khwin, (7) Smin Than-Kye, (8) Smin Upakaung, (9) Smin Zeik-Pun, (10) Lagun Ein. Commanded a regiment in the counterattack that drove out the remaining Ava forces. |
| 1413 | 1 regiment | Commanded one of the three vanguard regiments sent out to face Minye Kyawswa; the other two commanders were Lagun Ein and Smin Than-Byat. |
| 1414–1415 | | Defended Dala (modern Twante) against repeated Ava attacks. On 13 March 1415, his regiment mortally wounded Crown Prince Minye Kyawswa, forcing Ava forces to withdraw. Defended Bassein (Pathein) against Ava's counterattack led by King Minkhaung I himself. |
| 1417–1418 | | Defended Syriam against repeated Ava attacks. |

== Bibliography ==
- Aung-Thwin, Michael A. (2017). Myanmar in the Fifteenth Century. Honolulu: University of Hawai'i Press. ISBN 978-0-8248-6783-6.
- Harvey, G. E. (1925). History of Burma: From the Earliest Times to 10 March 1824. London: Frank Cass & Co. Ltd.
- Htin Aung, Maung (1967). A History of Burma. New York and London: Cambridge University Press.
- Kala, U (2006) [1724]. Maha Yazawin (in Burmese). Vol. 1–3 (4th printing ed.). Yangon: Ya-Pyei Publishing.
- Maha Sithu (2012) [1798]. Myint Swe; Kyaw Win; Thein Hlaing (eds.). Yazawin Thit (in Burmese). Vol. 1–3 (2nd printing ed.). Yangon: Ya-Pyei Publishing.
- Pan Hla, Nai (2005) [1968]. Razadarit Ayedawbon (in Burmese) (8th printing ed.). Yangon: Armanthit Sarpay.
- Royal Historical Commission of Burma (2003) [1832]. Hmannan Yazawin (in Burmese). Vol. 1–3. Yangon: Ministry of Information, Myanmar.

Smin Awa Naing Hanthawaddy
Political offices
| Preceded by | Senior Minister of the Pegu Court by 1408 – 1424? | Succeeded by |
