= Sittaung, Mon =

Sittaung
- Location in Myanmar
- Coordinates: 17°23′N 96°56′E
- Country: Myanmar
- State: Mon State
- District: Thaton District
- Township: Kyaikto Township
- Time zone: UTC+6:30 (MST)

Sittaung (Burmese: စစ်တောင်း, pronounced [sɪʔ táʊ̯ɴ]) is a village and a historical site in Mon State, Myanmar, located just north of Kyaikkatha.

== Bibliography ==
- Moore, Elizabeth H.; San Win (2014). "Sampanago: "City of Serpents" and Muttama (Martaban)" (PDF). SOAS: 216–237.
