= Dein Mani-Yut =

Burmese general and politician

Dein Mani-Yut ဒိန်မဏိရွတ်

Co-Chief Minister of Hanthawaddy
- In office 1388–1421
- Monarch: Razadarit
- Preceded by: Zeik-Bye
- Succeeded by: Maha Thamun?

Governor of Sittaung
- In office 1415–1420s
- Monarch: Razadarit
- Preceded by: Zeik-Bye
- Succeeded by: ?

Governor of Bassein
- In office 1408–1415
- Monarch: Razadarit
- Preceded by: Thilawa
- Succeeded by: Smin Awa Naing

Governor of Syriam
- In office c. 1370s–1408
- Monarchs: Binnya U (1370s?–1384); Razadarit (1384–1408)
- Preceded by: Smin Sam-Brat?
- Succeeded by: Smin Awa Naing

Personal details
- Born: Unknown Martaban Kingdom
- Died: Unknown Hanthawaddy kingdom
- Profession: Co-chief minister, general

Military service
- Allegiance: Hanthawaddy kingdom
- Branch/service: Royal Hanthawaddy Armed Forces
- Years of service: 1380s–1410s
- Rank: General
- Commands: Army, Navy
- Battles/wars: Ava–Hanthawaddy War (1385–1391); Ava–Hanthawaddy War (1401–1403); Ava–Hanthawaddy War (1408–1418)

Dein Mani-Yut or Dane Mani-yut, anglicised as Din Mnirot (Mon: ဒိန်မၞိက်ရတ်; Burmese: ဒိန်မဏိရွတ်, Burmese pronunciation: [dèiɴ mənḭ jʊ̯ʔ]), commonly known as Amat Dane (အမတ်ဒိန်, "Minister Dane") or Amat Tane (အမတ်တိန်, "Minister Tane"), was co-chief minister of Hanthawaddy during the reign of King Razadarit (1384–1421). He was also a senior general, and held key governorship posts at Syriam (1370s–1408), Bassein (1408–1415) and Sittaung (1415–1420s). Along with his colleague Byat Za, Dein was instrumental in Razadarit's reunification campaigns of the Mon-speaking kingdom in the late 1380s, as well as the Forty Years' War against the Burmese-speaking Ava Kingdom.

== Early career ==
According to the chronicle Razadarit Ayedawbon, he was a senior minister of the court of King Binnya U at the king's death in 1384. He was then known as Tein Nge (lit. 'Tein the Young') or Amat Dein/Tein (lit. 'Minister Dein/Tein'). (Note: Various chronicles use similar names to refer to the minister-general. The original version of the Razadarit Ayedawbon by Binnya Dala per (Aung-Thwin 2017: 251) calls him "Tein Nge" and "Amat Tein". The main chronicles such as (Yazawin Thit Vol. 1 2012: 213, 219) call him "Amat Tein". But the edited and revised version of the chronicle by Nai Pan Hla (Pan Hla 2005) calls him Amat Dein. (Harvey 1925: 114) and (Fernquest 2006) use "Deinmaniyut". See (Aung-Thwin 2017: 341–342) for the names of the minister as reported in the chronicles and by various historians.) Dein or Tein was the title which he received when the king appointed him governor of Syriam (modern Thanlyin). The appointment probably took place no earlier than the mid-1370s. (Note: The chronicle Razadarit Ayedawbon (Pan Hla 2005: 60, 66) says Gov. Smin Sam Brat (Thamein Than-Byat; personal name, Ma Lagun) of Syriam revolted in the 1370s but does not explicitly say that Dein succeeded Sam Brat.)

Dein lost control of Syriam in mid 1383 when Binnya U's son Binnya Nwe raised a rebellion during the king's long illness. He belonged to the faction of the court that remained loyal to the king while another faction, led by Senior Minister Zeik-Bye, secretly supported Nwe's rebellion. Dein did not offer support to Nwe even when the dying king handed over the power in October 1383 to his elder sister (and Nwe's adoptive mother) Princess Maha Dewi. It was only after the king's death that the court, including Dein, offered the throne to Nwe who ascended the throne with the title of Razadarit.

"I pay court only to a king who wears a white umbrella, not to one who is without the emblem of kingship. If you should take umbrage... [at] this and have me executed, I lose nothing more than my life... but the underpinnings of good administration would be uprooted for good. People would point out my fate as an example of losing one's life and leaving one's wife destitute for being loyal only to a crowned king and omitting to make overtures like offering advice to a pretender who later becomes king. Such attitudes are... anathema to good administration and will destroy your peace of mind. The citizenry and ecclesiastics as well will suffer should such attitudes become prevalent in a country."

— Minister Dein's response to Razadarit as to why he should not be executed.

In a famous episode, the 16-year-old new king reportedly questioned why Dein offered support only now, and why he should not be executed. The minister famously replied that his only "crime was being a servant of your father, the king." He continued that because he had sworn to be loyal to Binnya U, he would have fought Razadarit or anyone else to death to defend Binnya U; however that after his lord's death, he acknowledged Razadarit as the rightful successor, and was willing to serve the new king with the same kind of loyalty and resolve. The reply won him a stay. After deliberating with his advisers, the young king decided that he needed the support and expertise of the court, and restored Dein's post at Syriam.

== Razadarit years ==
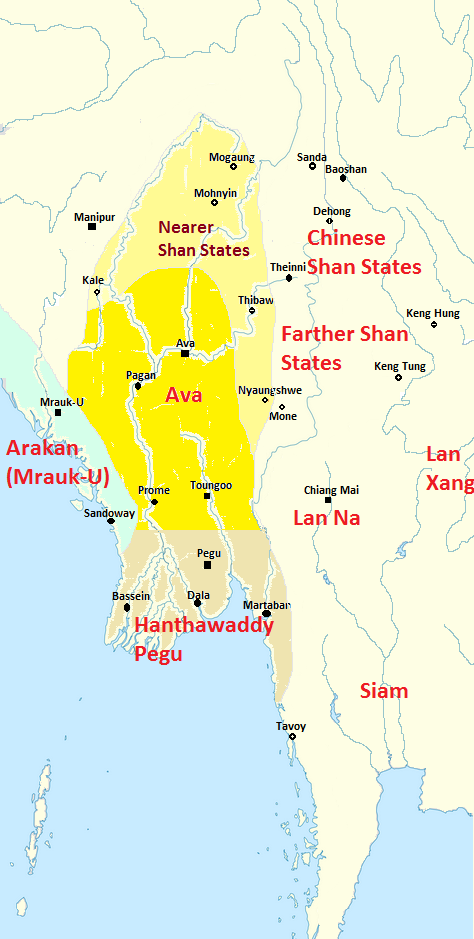
Burma in the 15th century

=== Gaining Razadarit's trust ===
In the beginning, Dein was not yet part of Razadarit's inner circle. The new king continued to rely on his advisers from the rebellion days to face off several challenges to his authority. (At his accession, Razadarit controlled only the Pegu-Syriam-Dagon corridor in the Pegu province. Other vassals had either refused to pledge allegiance, or declared outright independence (in the cases of Viceroys Byattaba and Laukpya).) When Viceroy Laukpya of Myaungmya invited the northern Ava Kingdom to invade the south to touch off what would become known the Forty Years' War in 1385, Dein was yet not part of the leadership. (Note: Dein is not mentioned as a commander in the first campaign of the Forty Years' War in the Razadarit Ayedawbon (Pan Hla 2005: 165–168).) It was only in the second campaign of 1386–1387 that Dein was given command of a 500-strong force to defend Hlaing; he outlasted Ava attacks on the town for over a month. In 1388, Dein, along with Byat Za, finally entered the king's inner circle after the duo's performance in the military campaign that conquered the Martaban Province (approximately, modern Mon State and southern Kayin State) on the upper Tenasserim coast. The duo further cemented their position when they successfully conquered the Irrawaddy delta in 1389–1390, giving Razadarit full control of all three provinces of the kingdom.

=== Co-chief minister–general (1388–1413) ===
From then on, Dein and Byat Za became the king's chief ministers and generals. The chronicle Razadarit Ayedawbon contains several episodes that portray Byat Za and Dein (and the court) as the adults who guided and tempered the ambitious, brash king. (Note: (Aung-Thwin 2017: 220): The chronicle was written by a minister or a group of ministers, and written from their perspective. "Part of the end statement—that Yazadarit achieved what he did because he followed the words of royal ministers...") Dein and Byat Za were the most senior members of the regime after the king, and often represented the kingdom. They were the ones Razadarit sent to Siam to receive the white elephant presented by the king of Ayutthaya. In general, the king relied on the duo for their advice even if he did not always listen to them. For their part, Dein and Byat Za dutifully carried out the tasks even when they did not fully agree with the decision. In one famous episode, in 1390, the king assigned Dein the ignominious task of asking Razadarit's first wife Queen Tala Mi Daw to give up her family heirlooms to be given to his favorite Chief Queen Piya Yaza Dewi. Dein did not want the task; he was sobbing before Tala Mi Daw when he asked for the heirlooms. A deeply hurt Tala Mi Daw committed suicide.

Dein and Byat Za complemented each other. While Dein was the more experienced court administrator, he was second-in-command to Byat Za in military matters. The Razadarit reports a rare disagreement between Dein and Byat Za in 1408 over Pegu's defensive formations against the upcoming invasion by Ava; the king chose Dein's more conservative formation over Byat Za's, and appointed Dein as co-commander. After the successful defense, the king upgraded Dein's title to Dein Mani-Yut, (lit. 'Jewels that Shine Like the Sun'). (Note: (Pan Hla 2005: 164, footnote 1): from Pali/Sanskrit, Dinamaṇiratna (Dina=Sun, Mani-Ratna (Jewels)). The Razadarit Ayedawbon chronicle reports two instances when Dein's title was upgraded to Dein Mani-Yut. The first instance was right after Razadarit's accession 1384 (Pan Hla 2005: 164); the second instance was in 1408 per (Pan Hla 2005: 249). The Yazawin Thit chronicle (Yazawin Thit Vol. 1 2012: 228) says he was given the upgraded title of Tein Mani-Yut in 1408.)

In addition to their ministerial duties, Dein and Byat Za were also responsible for the defense of their fiefdoms. In 1408, Razadarit transferred Dein from Syriam to Bassein, a strategic delta port, and gateway to the western kingdom of Launggyet (Arakan). The appointment came right after Hanthawaddy forces had dislodged Ava-appointed king Anawrahta of Launggyet. Dein and Byat Za, who had been governor of Myaungmya, another key delta port, were now responsible for defending the delta against upcoming Ava invasions. The duo successfully fended off Ava's reinvigorated invasion of the delta by Crown Prince Minye Kyawswa in 1410–1411.

=== Chief minister (1413–1421) ===
After Byat Za's death in 1413, Dein became the most senior minister. (Note: (Aung-Thwin 2017: 259) considers him the chief minister. The Razadarit Ayedawbon (Pan Hla 2005: 291) identifies Dein and Maha Thamun as the most senior ministers, with Dein's name coming first.) He officially remained an active general at least until the 1414–1415 dry season. (In 1414, he co-commanded the defenses of the delta with Prince Binnya Dhammaraza though in October he left the front to join the king and did not see action.) He may also have officially given up his gubernatorial position at Bassein in 1412 to Prince Binnya Bassein (lit. 'Lord of Bassein') although Dein remained responsible for the administration and defense of Bassein and the northern delta until 1415. (Note: The Razadarit Ayedawbon chronicle (Pan Hla 2005: 277) refers to one of the king's sons as Binnya Bassein (lit. 'Lord of Bassein') in 1412 although the chronicle (Pan Hla 2005: 283–284) also says Dein organized a flotilla from the 17 districts north of Bassein (out of 30 districts) in 1413 in preparation for an attack on Prome. Moreover, the Yazawin Thit chronicle (Yazawin Thit Vol. 1 2012: 262) names Dein governor of Bassein until 1415.) (Bassein apparently was a profitable trading hub. In 1414, when Minye Kyawswa tried to lure Dein to defect, Dein replied that he as ruler of Bassein was allowed to keep tax revenues up to 100,000 ticals of bronze annually, and that he doubted Ava could offer anything close to it. (Note: (Yazawin Thit Vol. 1 2012: 251) and (Hmannan Vol. 2 2003: 25): 70,000 bronze ticals from Bassein and 30,000 from Samyindon.)) He still commanded respect from the Ava high command; Crown Prince Minye Kyawswa called him an "old, wise general". The crown prince immediately launched an attack on Bassein after learning that Dein was no longer guarding Bassein.

At any rate, most of his responsibilities in the 1410s were as the king's chief minister and adviser. In 1413, he reaffirmed the alliance with the northern Shan state of Hsenwi (Theinni), and sought an alliance with Chiang Mai (Lan Na) by sending diplomatic missions. He was the king's main military adviser in the 1414–1415 campaign. After having received intelligence of Ava's planned massive invasion, Dein in October 1414 successfully convinced the king to leave the capital Pegu until things settled down. Later, in March 1415, when Pegu's first counterattack on Dagon (modern downtown Yangon) failed, Dein persuaded the king not to execute the two commanders of the mission, but instead to give them a second chance to lead another attack again, which was successful. The battle of Dagon set up the famous battle of Dala–Twante in which Crown Prince Minye Kyawswa fell in action. After the battle, Dein tried to get a senior Ava commander Nawrahta of Salin, a son of Viceroy Laukpya of Myaungmya, to defect by promising the governorship of Myaungmya. But his overtures were rejected by Nawrahta, who reaffirmed his allegiance to Ava.

Dein spent the rest of the years mostly at Pegu. He was reassigned to Sittaung as governor by the king who wanted his old minister to be close to the capital. He remained chief minister for the rest of the reign of Razadarit, who died in 1421. According to the Mon Yazawin chronicle by Shwe Naw, Chief Minister Dein did not take sides in the subsequent power struggle between Prince Binnya Dhammaraza and Prince Binnya Ran; as the chronicle puts it: the old minister left the "two main gates of the capital open". It was the last mention of him in the chronicle; it does not state whether Dein remained in office in the following years.

== Family ==
Chronicles do not mention any immediate family members of Dein. He did have a nephew named Sanda-Yathi, who served under him at Bassein.

== List of campaigns ==
The following is a list of Dein's military campaigns as reported in the chronicles.

Campaign	Duration	Troops commanded	Notes
Forty Years' War: Second Campaign; Ava invasion of Pegu	1386–1387	1 regiment (500)	Successfully defended Hlaing; the battle lasted for over a month.
Martaban	1387–1388	1 regiment (1000; Battle of Martaban)	Commanded one of two 1000-strong rearguard regiments that defeated the rebel governor Byattaba's army outside the city.
Irrawaddy delta and southern Arakan	1389–1390	unknown (delta operations); 1 regiment (700; Siege of Sandoway)	Co-commanded the army and navy with Byat Za that took the Irrawaddy delta. Deputy commander (under Byat Za) of a 700-strong regiment that chased Gov. Lauk Shein of Bassein to Sandoway (Thandwe) in southern Arakan, and got Sandoway to give up the governor.
Forty Years' War: Third Campaign; Ava invasion of Pegu	1390–1391	1 regiment (1000)	Commanded a thousand-strong regiment of the main Pegu army (8000 troops in 8 regiments, 40 elephants) that defended Pankyaw that successfully stopped Ava army.
Forty Years' War: Fourth Campaign; Pegu invasion of Ava	1401–1403	1 flotilla	Commanded one of the four flotillas of the combined fleet (200 war boats; 7000 troops) that invaded Ava by the Irrawaddy.
Forty Years' War: Fifth Campaign; Ava invasion of Pegu	1408	10 regiments (8000 to 10,000+ troops)	Became co-commander-in-chief when the king chose Dein's defensive formation over Byat Za's.
Forty Years' War: Sixth Campaign; Ava invasion of Pegu	1409–1410	unknown	
Forty Years' War: Seventh Campaign; Ava invasion of Pegu	1410–1411	unknown	Co-commanded Pegu's defense of the Irrawaddy delta with Byat Za. Successfully defended Bassein against a siege by Crown Prince Minye Kyawswa of Ava.
Forty Years' War: Eighth Campaign; Battle of Arakan	1411–1412	N/A	Did not participate
Forty Years' War: Ninth Campaign; Ava invasion of Pegu	1412–1413	unknown	Military adviser to the king. Sent diplomatic missions to Hsenwi to reaffirm alliance with the Shan state, and to seek an alliance with Chiang Mai. Organized a flotilla from the 17 districts north of Bassein (out of 30 districts).
Forty Years' War: Tenth Campaign; Ava invasion of Pegu	1414–1415	unknown	Co-commanded the defenses at Panko in the delta, along with Prince Binnya Dhammaraza, early in the campaign. Later joined Razadarit's sojourn to Martaban.

== Bibliography ==
- Aung-Thwin, Michael A. (2017). Myanmar in the Fifteenth Century. Honolulu: University of Hawai'i Press. ISBN 978-0-8248-6783-6.
- Fernquest, Jon (Spring 2006). "Rajadhirat's Mask of Command: Military Leadership in Burma (c. 1348–1421)" (PDF). SBBR. 4 (1). Archived from the original (PDF) on 1 August 2019.
- Harvey, G. E. (1925). History of Burma: From the Earliest Times to 10 March 1824. London: Frank Cass & Co. Ltd.
- Kala, U (2006) [1724]. Maha Yazawin (in Burmese). Vol. 1–3 (4th printing ed.). Yangon: Ya-Pyei Publishing.
- Maha Sithu (2012) [1798]. Kyaw Win; Thein Hlaing (eds.). Yazawin Thit (in Burmese). Vol. 1–3 (2nd printing ed.). Yangon: Ya-Pyei Publishing.
- Pan Hla, Nai (2005) [1968]. Razadarit Ayedawbon (in Burmese) (8th printing ed.). Yangon: Armanthit Sarpay.
- Royal Historical Commission of Burma (2003) [1832]. Hmannan Yazawin (in Burmese). Vol. 1–3. Yangon: Ministry of Information, Myanmar.
- Shwe Naw, ed. (1922) [1785]. Mon Yazawin (in Burmese). Translated by Shwe Naw. Yangon: Burma Publishing Workers Association Press.
