= Forty Years' War =

1385–1424 war in Myanmar

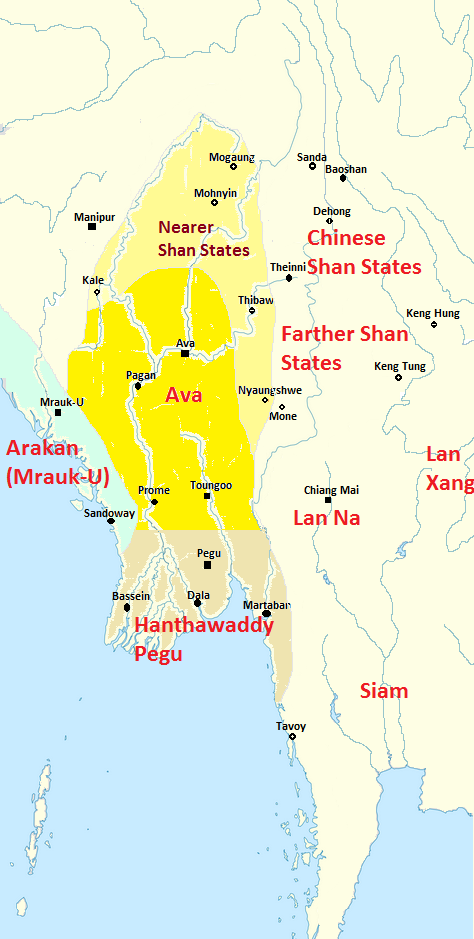
- Burma in 1450, after the Forty Years' War
Date	1385–1423
Location	Primarily in Lower Burma also in Upper Burma, Arakan, Shan States
Result	Stalemate: Pegu preserves independence; Arakan tributary of Pegu (1412–1421)
Territorial changes	No long-term changes

Belligerents
Ava Kingdom; Kalay; Möng Yang	Hanthawaddy Kingdom; Launggyet Kingdom; Hsenwi State

Commanders and leaders
Swa Saw Ke; Tarabya; Thilawa; Minkhaung I; Minye Kyawswa †; Thihathu	Razadarit; Byat Za; Dein Mani-Yut; Lagun Ein †; Smin Bayan; Binnya Ran I; Min Saw Mon or Min Khayi

The Forty Years' War (Burmese: အနှစ်လေးဆယ်စစ်; 1385 – 1423; also Ava–Pegu War or the Mon–Burmese War) was a conflict fought between the Burmese-speaking Kingdom of Ava and the Mon-speaking Kingdom of Hanthawaddy. The war was fought during two separate periods: 1385 to 1391, and 1401 to 1424, interrupted by two truces of 1391–1401 and 1403–1408. It was fought primarily in today's Lower Burma and also in Upper Burma, Shan State, and Rakhine State. It ended in a stalemate, preserving the independence of Hanthawaddy, and effectively ending Ava's efforts to rebuild the erstwhile Pagan Kingdom.

== First half ==
The war's origins can be traced to Hanthawaddy Pegu's political turmoil, which intensified after King Razadarit's rise to power in 1384 through a rebellion against his ailing father. Governor Smin Sam Lek of Donwun and Viceroys Laukpya of Myaungmya and Byattaba of Martaban refused to recognize the new king. Laukpya would invite King Swa Saw Ke of the Ava Kingdom to Hanthawaddy's north to help him take the Pegu throne himself.

=== First phase ===
In the first phase, Swa Saw Ke of Ava began the hostilities by invading Pegu during the latter kingdom's dynastic succession struggles. The war began c. December 1385. (Note: Various chronicles present different dates. (Maha Yazawin Vol. 1 2006: 290) and (Hmannan Vol. 1 2003: 417) say the first invasion was launched in 748 ME (1386/87); (Yazawin Thit Vol. 1 2012: 195) says the invasion began in 747 ME (1385/86); the Razadarit Ayedawbon (Pan Hla 2005: 164) suggests that the invasion began in the dry season following Razadarit's accession, i.e. 746 ME (1384/85). Furthermore, the invasion likely began in December. All the main chronicles (Maha Yazawin Vol. 1 2006: 293), (Yazawin Thit Vol. 1 2012: 197), (Hmannan Vol. 1 2003: 420) say the invasion lasted over five months and had to be called off because the rainy season was fast approaching.)

Saw and the Ava court did not expect difficulty invading Pegu and sent two armies led by his sons Crown Prince Tarabya, who was about to turn 17, and Prince Min Swe of Pyinzi, who had recently turned 12, guided by Generals Thilawa of Yamethin and Theinkhathu of Sagu. Pegu, in contrast, struggled to find manpower and could only defend a few key fortifications along the Sittaung River and towards the northwest of its capital, Pegu. The Avan troops steadily advanced along the Sittaung until they reached Fort Pankyaw where they could not take it despite weeks of siege. In the northwest, Min Swe's army advanced steadily and after a victory in Hmawbi, Ava had a clear path to Pegu.

Tarabya took Pankyaw and, believing Razadarit had retreated to Dagon, ordered Ava forces to converge around Dagon. However, Razadarit had actually marched to Pankyaw, cutting off Ava's rear. When Ava forces learned of this siege and attempted to return, Pankyaw had already fallen to Razadarit. Razadarit then managed to break through an ensuing battle between Tarabya and Razadarit's forces and successfully returned his forces to Pegu.

=== Second phase ===
After an interlude during the rainy season where Razadarit tried and failed to peace out, Ava invaded again with a much larger and more coordinated force. This force included riverine forces along the Irrawaddy river that met up with Laukpya's flotilla near Myanaung. Both land and naval forces laid siege to a newly reinforced set of Peguan forts in Hmawbi, Hlaing, Dagon and Dala. While they were able to take Fort Hmawbi, the numerical superior forces were unable to take any others and the war entered an uneasy status quo. During this stalemate, Razadarit personally launched a surprise counterattack and took back Fort Hmawbi using a decoy detachment. Peguan forces were able to burn the fort to the ground and slaughter the Avan garrison and forced Ava to retreat from their sieges.

=== Third phase ===
After the retreat from Hmawbi, Swa vowed to return to the war. However, he could not do so for three years becoming preoccupied with renewed conflict with Maw (Mong Mao), who challenged Ava's northern border and its vassalage of Kale after Ava's spectacular failures.

During this time, Razadarit reunified his provinces, starting with a successful capture of Donwun and rest of the northern Martaban province by late 1388. consolidating his control over the entire Martaban province. Razadarit then attacked Bassein-Myaungmya in late 1389, where Laukpya did not receive any help from Ava. After a swift attack on Governor Nyi Kan-Kaung's garrison in Dala, Razadrit advanced to Bassein where, despite several charges, he was unable to break past the defensives or Laukpya's war boats on the Pathein River. Razadarit's forces retreated and set up a trap between Bassein and Myaungmya, where his commander Lagun Ein was able to draw Bassein forces into the ambush. After two battles in Daybawthe and Myaungmya itself, Razadarit defeated Laukpya's forces.

Razadarit then consolidated his control over the Irrawaddy Delta and occupied the town of Gu Htut, a border town within Ava. Swa could not overlook this latest transgression and, finally freed up from the war with Maw, ordered a renewed campaign to the south. However, Razadarit was ready, raising over 13,000 troops with his newly consolidated control over his province. Ava's invasion was bogged down immediately and their riverine war boats could not break through Myanaung despite repeated attacks. After one Peguan squadron, led by Maha Thamun, got close enough to Swa's royal war boat, Ava called off the attacks. At the same time, Ava's land advance on Fort Pankyaw was also unsuccessful.

Pegu's new young king Razadarit aided by able commanders Byat Za, Dein Mani-Yut, Lagun Ein and Maha Thamun had defeated Ava's multiple invasions. In 1391, Ava had to agree to a truce, which lasted until 1401 when the war would resume in its second half.

== Second half ==
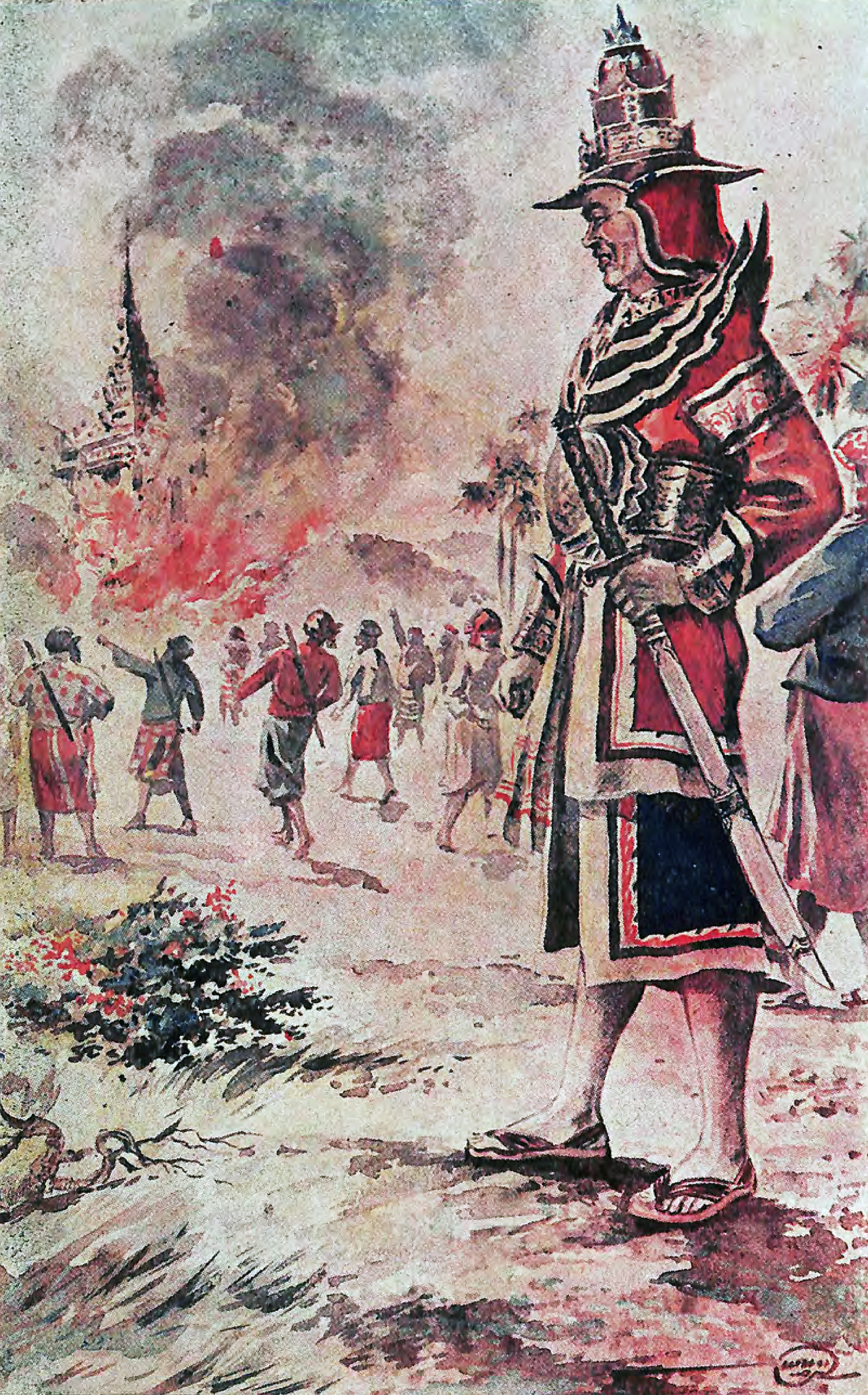
Minkhaung I ordered his army to burn down a Buddhist hall erected by Razadarit. An illustration from Rachathirat, a Thai version of Razadarit Ayedawbon, 1946 printed edition.

The second half of the war was initiated by Pegu. To take advantage of Ava's dynastic succession crisis, Razadarit invaded Upper Burma in full force with a large flotilla in 1401. Ava's defenses held, and Razadarit and Minkhaung I of Ava agreed to another truce in 1403. The second truce lasted less than five years as Ava quickly went on an expansion spree, swallowing up the Shan states of Kale and Mohnyin in the north, and Launggyet Kingdom (Arakan) in the west, between 1404 and 1406. Pegu could not allow Ava to get too strong, and renewed the war. In 1408, Peguan forces dislodged Avan troops from Arakan. Pegu also found an ally in the Shan state of Theinni (Hsenwi), which too wanted to check Ava's ambitions.

Between 1408 and 1413, Ava was forced to fight on multiple fronts: Theinni in the north, and Pegu in the south and in the west (Arakan). Nonetheless, by 1412, Avan forces, led by Crown Prince Minye Kyawswa, had begun to gain an upper hand. Minye Kyawswa defeated Theinni and its Chinese allies in 1412. He invaded the Hanthawaddy country in full force in 1414, and conquered the Irrawaddy delta in 1415, forcing Razadarit to flee Pegu for Martaban. But Minye Kyawswa was killed in battle in March 1415.

== End ==
After the death of Minye Kyawswa, the enthusiasm for war dissipated on both sides. Only three more campaigns (1416–1417, 1417–1418 and 1423–1424) were fought half-heartedly. In 1421–1422, two bitter rivals Minkhaung I and Razadarit died. The last campaign of the war came in November 1423 when Ava's new king Thihathu invaded the Hanthawaddy country during Hanthawaddy's succession struggles. Pegu's Crown Prince Binnya Ran I made peace with Ava by giving his elder sister Shin Sawbu to Thihathu. Ava forces withdrew in early 1424, ending the four-decade-long war.

== Bibliography ==
- Aung-Thwin, Michael A.; Maitrii Aung-Thwin (2012). A History of Myanmar Since Ancient Times (illustrated ed.). Honolulu: University of Hawai'i Press. ISBN 978-1-86189-901-9.
- Aung-Thwin, Michael A. (2017). Myanmar in the Fifteenth Century. Honolulu: University of Hawai'i Press. ISBN 978-0-8248-6783-6.
- Aye Chan (2006). "Burma: Shan Domination in the Ava Period (c. AD 1310–1555)" (PDF). Journal of the Siam Society. 94.
- Fernquest, Jon (Spring 2006). "Rajadhirat's Mask of Command: Military Leadership in Burma (c. 1384–1421)" (PDF). SBBR. 4 (1). Archived from the original (PDF) on 2009-02-19.
- Fernquest, Jon (Autumn 2006). "Crucible of War: Burma and the Ming in the Tai Frontier Zone (1382–1454)" (PDF). SOAS Bulletin of Burma Research. 4 (2). Archived from the original (PDF) on 2019-04-15.
- Harvey, G. E. (1925). History of Burma: From the Earliest Times to 10 March 1824. London: Frank Cass & Co. Ltd.
- Htin Aung, Maung (1967). A History of Burma. New York and London: Cambridge University Press.
- Kala, U (2006) [1724]. Maha Yazawin (in Burmese). Vol. 1–3 (4th printing ed.). Yangon: Ya-Pyei Publishing.
- Lieberman, Victor B. (2003). Strange Parallels: Southeast Asia in Global Context, c. 800–1830, volume 1, Integration on the Mainland. Cambridge University Press. ISBN 978-0-521-80496-7.
- Maha Sithu (2012) [1798]. Myint Swe; Kyaw Win; Thein Hlaing (eds.). Yazawin Thit (in Burmese). Vol. 1–3 (2nd printing ed.). Yangon: Ya-Pyei Publishing.
- Mi Mi Hlaing (2018). "States of Hostilities in Ava Period (First Ava Period)" (PDF). Mandalay University Research Journal. 9 (1). Mandalay: University of Mandalay.
- Pan Hla, Nai (2005) [1968]. Razadarit Ayedawbon (in Burmese) (8th printing ed.). Yangon: Armanthit Sarpay.
- Phayre, Lt. Gen. Sir Arthur P. (1883). History of Burma (1967 ed.). London: Susil Gupta.
- Royal Historical Commission of Burma (2003) [1832]. Hmannan Yazawin (in Burmese). Vol. 1–3. Yangon: Ministry of Information, Myanmar.
- Than Tun (December 1959). "History of Burma: A.D. 1300–1400". Journal of Burma Research Society. XLII (II).
