= Byat Za =

Co-chief minister of Hanthawaddy (1388–1413)

Smin Byat Za
- သမိန်ဗြာဇ္ဇ

Co-Chief Minister of Hanthawaddy
- In office 1388–1413
- Monarch: Razadarit
- Preceded by: Zeik-Bye
- Succeeded by: Dein Mani-Yut

Governor of Myaungmya
- In office 1390–1413
- Monarch: Razadarit
- Preceded by: Laukpya (as Viceroy)
- Succeeded by: Smin Than-Laik

Governor of Donwun
- In office 1388–1390
- Monarch: Razadarit
- Preceded by: Smin Sam Lek
- Succeeded by: ?

Personal details
- Born: Me Sauk (Ma Thauk) Martaban Kingdom
- Died: c. March 1413: near Prome (Pyay); Ava Kingdom
- Spouse: Tala Mi Baik
- Profession: Chief minister, commander-in-chief

Military service
- Allegiance: Hanthawaddy kingdom
- Branch/service: Royal Hanthawaddy Armed Forces
- Years of service: 1380s–1413
- Rank: Commander-in-chief (1388–1413)
- Commands: Army, Navy
- Battles/wars: Ava–Hanthawaddy War (1385–1391); Ava–Hanthawaddy War (1401–1403); Ava–Hanthawaddy War (1408–1418) (to 1413)

Smin (Note: Smin is a transliteration of the Mon language title သ္ငီ. The title is also transliterated into English as Smim.) Byat Za (Burmese: သမိန်ဗြာဇ္ဇ, Burmese pronunciation: [θəmèiɴ bjaʔ za̰]; also spelled in Burmese, သမိန်ဖြတ်စ, (Note: The name reported in the standard Burmese chronicles: See (Maha Yazawin Vol. 1 2006: 300) and (Hmannan Vol. 1 2003: 430).) [θəmèiɴ pʰjaʔ sa̰]; d. 1413) was co-chief minister of Hanthawaddy and the commander-in-chief of the Hanthawaddy armed forces from 1388 to 1413 during the reign of King Razadarit. He also held key governorship posts at Myaungmya (1390–1413) and Donwun (1388–1390). Along with his colleague Dein Mani-Yut and his key officer Lagun Ein, Byat Za was instrumental in Razadarit's reunification campaigns of the Mon-speaking kingdom in the late 1380s, as well as the Forty Years' War against the Burmese-speaking Ava Kingdom until his death.

== Early career ==
The first mention of him in the chronicle Razadarit Ayedawbon is as one of the court officials who pledged allegiance to the new king Razadarit in 1384. His name was Ma Thauk (မသောက်), (Note: Ma Thauk is a Burmese pronunciation-based transliteration of Mon language name မသောက်. Per (Pan Hla 2005: 326, footnote 1), the letter မ is pronounced as Me ([mɛ̯]) in Mon; and the letter သ is pronounced as "sa" in Mon. Therefore his name may be better transliterated as Me Sauk ([mɛ̯ saʊ̯k]).) and he was given the title Than-Lan (သံလံ) (Note: Than-Lan is a Burmese pronunciation-based transliteration of Mon name သံလံ. Per the basic Mon pronunciation rules noted in (Pan Hla 2005: 326, footnote 1), the name may be transliterated as Sam-Lam.) by the new king. The Pak Lat Chronicles say that he was already a senior minister and commander with the title Smin Than-Byat (သမိန်သံဗြတ်) (Note: Than-Byat is a Burmese pronunciation-based transliteration of Mon name သံဗြတ်. Per the basic Mon pronunciation rules noted in (Pan Hla 2005: 326, footnote 1), the name may be transliterated as Sam-Brat.) in 1387 when he was posted at Tari. (Note: (Pan Hla 2005: 171): Binnya Dala's version of the Razadarit Ayedawbon says the commander posted at Tari, who later became known as Byat Za, was Than-Lan. However, Pak Lat says the person who would become known as Byat Za was already a senior minister (အမတ်ကြီး) named Than-Byat.) At any rate, neither mentions him as a senior commander or minister during the first two invasions of Hanthawaddy (1385–1387) by the northern Ava Kingdom. Indeed, he commanded just 500 troops in 1387. (Note: Chronicles (Pan Hla 2005: 171) say he commanded 5000 troops. But per (Harvey 1925: 333–336), the troop levels reported in Burmese chronicles should be reduced by an order of magnitude; hence, he probably commanded 500 troops.)

== Rise to prominence ==
Nevertheless, the regimental commander quickly rose to be the top commander and strategist of the young king after his success in the Martaban campaign of 1387–1388. The campaign was Razadarit's attempt to consolidate his kingdom during a lull in the war against Ava. Than-Lan and one of his deputies Than-Lon made their name early in the campaign in the battles in the northern part of the province that led to the capture of Donwun, a key town about 100 kilometres (62 mi) north of Martaban. Impressed, the king quickly brought Than-Lan into his inner circle, and ultimately accepted Than-Lan's battle plan on Martaban (Mottama), the provincial capital. The king also appointed Than-Lan commander of a thousand-strong rearguard regiment in the 7000-strong invasion army.

The battle plan almost did not work. It turned out that the Martaban command had expected the route of the attack. Martaban forces led by the rebel governor Byattaba himself ambushed Pegu's five vanguard regiments as they came out of the forest at the outskirts of Martaban, and thoroughly routed them. However, the Martaban command did not know that two other enemy regiments remained in the forest. When Dein, commander of the other rearguard unit asked Than-Lan if they should retreat, Than-Lan persuaded Dein to stage a surprise attack of their own in due time. As the Martaban troops collected the plunder on the battlefield, Than-Lan's and Dein's units came out of the woods and went after the Martaban command. Taken by surprise, Byattaba and his two brother commanders fled by boat, after which the rest of the Martaban troops surrendered. Than-Lan and Dein raced to Martaban, and got to the city where the defenders quickly surrendered. The rest of the province in the south also submitted.

After the improbable victory, an overjoyed Razadarit gave Than-Lan a princely title of Smin Byat Za, (lit. "Lord Diamantine Warrior") and also appointed him governor of Donwun, the ancestral town of the ruling dynasty.

== Co-Chief Minister–General ==
After Martaban, Byat Za joined Dein as the king's two most senior ministers and commanders. The chronicle Razadarit Ayedawbon portrays Byat Za and Dein as the adults who guided and tempered the ambitious, brash young king.

=== Limited war doctrine ===
The chronicle reports a didactic episode in which Byat Za politely lectured the young king about statecraft. It came at the end of the Irrawaddy delta campaign of 1389–1390. By then, Razadarit's forces commanded by Byat Za and Dein had defeated the rebel forces led by Viceroy Laukpya of Myaungmya. When the king learned that Gov. Lauk Shein of Bassein (Pathein) had escaped with "ten elephant loads of gold and silver", he ordered Byat Za and Dein to go after him and recover the loot. With 700 troops and 10 war elephants, Byat Za (and Dein as his deputy) pursued Lauk Shein all the way to the gates of Sandoway (Thandwe), in the neighboring kingdom of Arakan (modern Rakhine State). A siege ensued but both sides wanted to end it quickly. Sandoway was unprepared to withstand a long siege, and Byat Za with only 700 troops could not afford one. The two sides soon reached an agreement. The governor of Sandoway handed over Lauk Shein, along with his family and loot, to Byat Za, who in turn lifted the siege. Byat Za and his commanders then learned from Lauk Shein's men that Sandoway was starving and had only four or five days' worth of food left. Byat Za's deputies then urged him to resume the siege; they felt the town would fall within 10 days, and they could take the town's gold and silver. Byat Za flat out refused, and ordered the withdrawal to proceed.

When they got back to Bassein, Razadarit asked Byat Za why he did not sack Sandoway. The minister-general lectured the young king on a doctrine of limited war.

There are two aspects of war. One is to settle matters through diplomacy and the other through force of arms. In this affair, it was settled by negotiation, and they delivered the enemy per the agreement. Had we broken our word, and attacked them, we'd no longer have the option to settle matters through negotiation. We'd have to settle by force of arms only.

According to Fernquest, Byat Za's doctrine of limited warfare can be compared to that popularized by Clausewitz that “War is the continuation of politics by other means”—an idea that goes all the way back to the political philosopher Machiavelli. Razadarit was satisfied with Byat Za's logic. After all, the minister-general had been instrumental in bringing all three Mon-speaking provinces into his fold. The 22-year-old king then appointed Byat Za governor of Myaungmya, a key delta port.

=== Forty Years' War ===
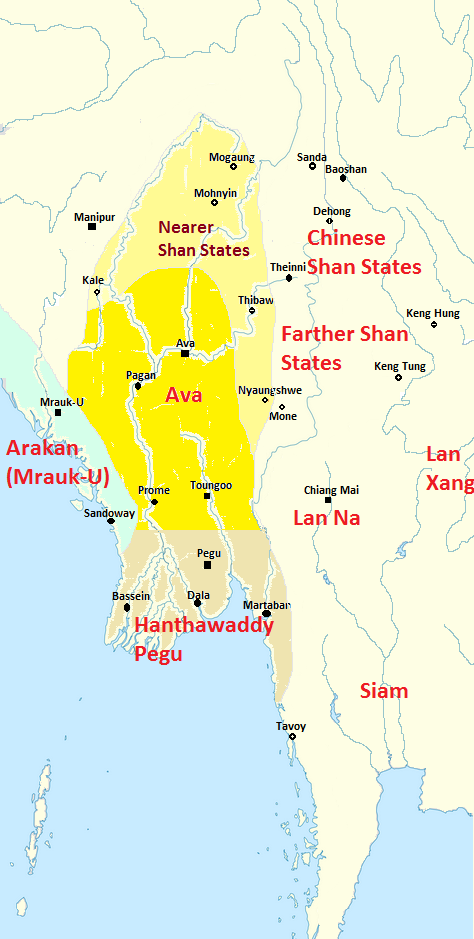
Burma in the 15th century

Byat Za's and Dein's role in the long running war with Ava was not just to be military commanders but also be the king's chief advisers. With regard to Ava, the two ministers tried to get their king to achieve and maintain peace with the larger and more populous northern kingdom. Razadarit always sought his chief ministers' input even if he did not always follow their advice.

==== Third campaign (1390–1391) ====
Indeed, soon after listening to Byat Za's lecture about limited warfare, Razadarit ordered an occupation of Gu-Htut inside Ava territory. For their part, Byat Za and Dein dutifully carried out their responsibilities even if they did not agree with the king's decision. They went to the front with the king when the inevitable Ava invasion came in 1390–1391. After Pegu defenses had successfully held off repeated Ava land and naval attacks, the Pegu court (Note: Razadarit Ayedawbon (Pan Hla 2005: 197–200) says that the initial peace proposal was made by Maha Thamun, one of the four most senior ministers, and that the other three senior ministers of the Pegu court agreed, and persuaded Razadarit to end the war. (The other three ministers were not explicitly named in the sentence, but they would have been Byat Za, Dein and Zeik-Bye as mentioned in earlier parts of the chronicle.)) persuaded their king to return Gu-Htut to Ava in exchange for Ava's recognition. With Pegu negotiating from a position of strength, Pegu got favorable terms. In 1391, Razadarit and King Swa Saw Ke signed a peace treaty that allowed Pegu to consolidate most of its gains.

What followed was ten years of peace between Ava and Pegu. Byat Za and Dein administered the kingdom, which had emerged as a bona fide power in the region. Razadarit was at the height of his power. King of Ayutthaya sent a white elephant, a highly propitious symbol of Southeast Asian monarchs, to Razadarit; Byat Za and Dein went to Kamphaeng Phet to receive the elephant.

==== Resumption of war (1401–1403) ====
Byat Za was again dutifully by Razadarit's side in 1401 when his king decided to discard the treaty and invade Ava during a succession crisis at Ava. He commanded the invasion fleet of 1300 war boats and cargo ships, carrying 5000 (or 7000) troops that sailed up the Irrawaddy. While the invasion fleet penetrated deep into Upper Burma, they could not break through Ava's defenses, and had to retreat before the next rainy season began. By the start of the dry season in November 1402, Ava was now on the offensive, trying to relieve its southern port town of Prome (Pyay), which had been under siege by Pegu forces for a year. Byat Za now commanded the army, and narrowly defeated an Ava army attempting to break the siege. After the hard fought victory, Byat Za recognized that Pegu positions inside Ava territory were increasingly untenable. He recommended the king to lift the siege of Prome, and bring back the garrison at Nawin outside Prome to safer grounds. Although Dein also agreed with Byat Za's assessment, Razadarit chose not to withdraw. As Byat Za and Dein feared, Ava forces sacked the Nawin garrison on 26 December 1402, forcing Pegu to ask for terms about ten days after the battle.

The shoe was now on the other foot. A rueful Razadarit conceded that he should have listened to Byat Za and Dein, and not to the bravado of other commanders. He chose Byat Za to lead the Pegu delegation to the Ava camp. There, Byat Za met King Minkhaung I of Ava, and negotiated a ceasefire with more negotiations to follow. After five months of negotiations at Pegu, the parties agreed to a treaty. Unlike in 1391, the terms favored Ava. Though it lost no territory, Pegu agreed to share the customs revenue of Bassein (Pathein), and supply 30 elephants annually to Ava. In return, Minkhaung sent his only sister Thupaba Dewi to be queen of Razadarit in a marriage alliance.

==== Second resumption of war (1408–1410) ====
Byat Za was again called into action in 1408 when Razadarit decided to break the treaty. In March of that year, (Note: (Yazawin Thit Vol. 1 2012: 228, 235): Late Tagu 769 ME = 25 February 1408 to 24 March 1408) Razadarit sent in a force to dislodge Anawrahta, the Ava installed king from Arakan. Ava had been steadily acquiring its neighboring states since 1404 and Razadarit felt that he could not get Ava to get too strong. Byat Za was not part of the Arakan invasion force; he led the defensive operations at home against the certain Ava reprisal. In one rare disagreement between Byat Za and Dein, the two men disagreed about the defensive plans. The king chose Dein's more conservative formation over Byat Za's, and appointed Dein as co-commander.

When Ava's invasion came, Pegu's defenses held, greatly helped by rainy season conditions. When Ava asked for a truce, Razadarit appointed Byat Za to lead the Pegu delegation. Razadarit's orders were to arrange a face-to-face meeting between Razadarit and Minkhaung in which Pegu's security forces would assassinate the Ava king. Though Byat Za went along with the plan, the second meeting never materialized because Byat Za's blunt talking officer Lagun Ein, who was never comfortable with the planned deception, revealed that Pegu was not negotiating in good faith. The negotiations broke down, and Byat Za led the counterattack on the Ava forces, which withdrew in disarray.

When Ava again invaded in the next dry season, Byat Za was again responsible for the overall defensive operations. The counterattack this time was led by Razadarit himself. Five months into the invasion c. May 1410, Razadarit routed Minkhaung's army, capturing several infantry, cavalry and elephants.

==== Last years (1410–1413) ====
Byat Za's last military campaign was in the dry season of 1410–1411. He and Dein successfully defended their respective fortified port cities of Myaungmya and Bassein against Ava land and naval forces led by Crown Prince Minye Kyawswa. The battle of Myaungmya was the last reported battle to have been commanded by Byat Za. His health deteriorated rapidly afterwards, and was no longer able to go to the front in the next two dry season campaigns (1411–1412 and 1412–1413) though he remained in charge of Myaungmya, his fief and home. In early 1413, a severely ill Byat Za managed to travel to the front near Prome. There, Razadarit and Lagun Ein came to see him. Everyone realized the situation, and broke down and wept. Byat Za died three days later. Lagun Ein too fell in action just a few days later. Razadarit was greatly shaken by the deaths of Lagun Ein and Byat Za, and ordered an immediate withdrawal from the Prome front.

== List of campaigns ==
The following is a list of Byat Za's military campaigns as reported in the chronicles.

Campaign	Duration	Troops commanded	Notes
Martaban	1387–1388	1 regiment (500 troops; Battle of Tari); 1 regiment (1000; Battle of Martaban)	Defended Tari against several attacks by Sam Lek of Donwun with a 500-strong regiment; Went on to take Lagun Byi and Than-Maung towns. Commanded one of two 1000-strong rearguard regiments that defeated the rebel governor Byattaba's army outside the city; Awarded the title Byat Za for the victory by the king.
Irrawaddy delta and southern Arakan	1389–1390	unknown (delta operations); 1 regiment (700; Siege of Sandoway)	Co-commanded the army and navy with Dein that took the Irrawaddy delta. Chased Gov. Lauk Shein of Bassein to Sandoway (Thandwe) in southern Arakan, and got Sandoway to give up the governor.
Ava's third invasion	1390–1391	8 regiments (8000)	Second-in-command after Razadarit in defense of Pankyaw of the main Pegu army (8000 troops in 8 regiments, 40 elephants); Commanded a thousand-strong regiment; Successfully stopped Ava army.
Forty Years' War: Forth Campaign; Pegu invasion of Ava	1401–1403	12 naval squadrons (5000–7000); 7 regiments (3000 (or 7000); battle of Thawutti) (Note: (Pan Hla 2005: 225) says 7 regiments, totaling 3000 troops marched to Thawutti, and names all seven commanders. The number of troops may have been 7000 since the Burmese numerals ၃ (3) and ၇ (7) can be mis-copied.)	Admiral of the invasion fleet, consisting of 1300 war boats and supply boats, 5000 (or 7000) troops. Defeated an Ava invasion force at the battle of Thawutti in 1402.
Forty Years' War: Fifth Campaign; Ava invasion of Pegu	1408	10 regiments (8000 to 10,000+ troops)	Originally commander-in-chief of Pegu's overall defense operations but Dein became co-commander-in-chief when the king chose Dein's defensive formation over Byat Za's. Led Pegu's delegation in faux ceasefire negotiations with Ava's high command
Forty Years' War: Sixth Campaign; Ava invasion of Pegu	1409–1410	4 regiments (4000)	Commanded rearguard army; his own regiment consisted of 1000 troops and 10 elephants
Forty Years' War: Seventh Campaign; Ava invasion of Pegu	1410–1411	unknown	Co-commanded Pegu's defense of the Irrawaddy delta with Dein. Successfully defended Myaungmya against a siege by Crown Prince Minye Kyawswa of Ava.

== Bibliography ==
- Fernquest, Jon (Spring 2006). "Rajadhirat's Mask of Command: Military Leadership in Burma (c. 1348–1421)" (PDF). SBBR. 4 (1). Archived from the original (PDF) on 2019-08-01.
- Harvey, G. E. (1925). History of Burma: From the Earliest Times to 10 March 1824. London: Frank Cass & Co. Ltd.
- Kala, U (2006) [1724]. Maha Yazawin (in Burmese). Vol. 1–3 (4th printing ed.). Yangon: Ya-Pyei Publishing.
- Maha Sithu (2012) [1798]. Kyaw Win; Thein Hlaing (eds.). Yazawin Thit (in Burmese). Vol. 1–3 (2nd printing ed.). Yangon: Ya-Pyei Publishing.
- Pan Hla, Nai (2005) [1968]. Razadarit Ayedawbon (in Burmese) (8th printing ed.). Yangon: Armanthit Sarpay.
- Royal Historical Commission of Burma (2003) [1832]. Hmannan Yazawin (in Burmese). Vol. 1–3. Yangon: Ministry of Information, Myanmar.
