= Ava–Hanthawaddy War (1385–1391) =

Military conflict in present-day Lower Myanmar

- Part of the Forty Years' War
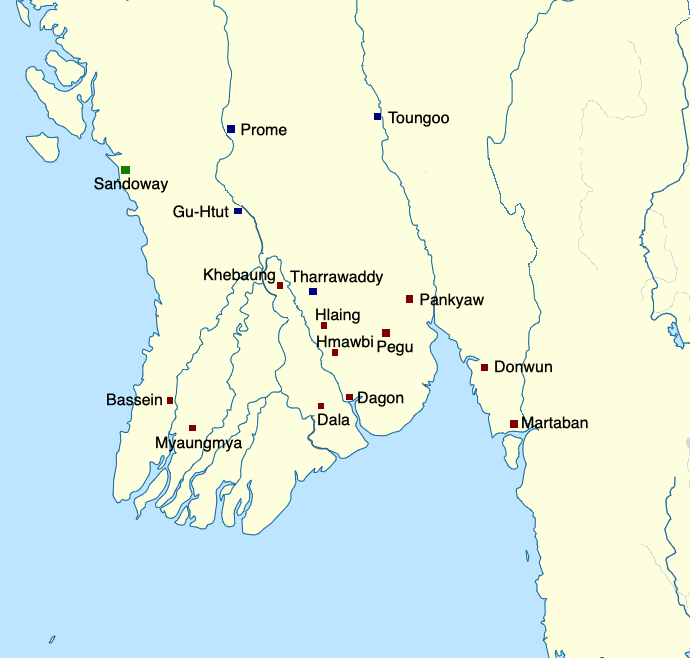
- Key locations of the war Ava territory in blue; Hanthawaddy territory in red; Arakan territory in green
Date	December 1385 – early 1391 (Note: The peace treaty had been agreed to by early 1391 but Ava did not withdraw its last remaining troops until the following Burmese year, either c. April 1391 or in the following dry season c. November/December 1391.)
Location	Present-day Lower Myanmar
Result	Hanthawaddy victory Full results: Ava recognizes Hanthawaddy Pegu; Ava renounces its claim on the Myaungmya province; Pegu returns Gu-Htut and Ahlwe to Ava
Territorial changes	Myaungmya reincorporated into Hanthawaddy

Belligerents
Ava; Myaungmya	Hanthawaddy Pegu

Commanders and leaders
Swa Saw Ke; Tarabya; Min Swe; Thilawa; Theinkhathu; Min Letwe †; Laukpya (surrendered); Ma Pyit-Nwe (executed); Lauk Shein (executed); Saw E Binnya †	Razadarit; Byat Za; Dein Mani-Yut; Nyi Kan-Kaung (Note: until 1389 when he was accused of treason and executed) (executed); Smin Than-Kye; Maha Thamun; Smin Ye-Thin-Yan; Lagun Ein; Nandameit †; Yaza Manu †

Strength
1385–1386 (Note: Unless otherwise stated, the military mobilization figures in this article are reduced by an order of magnitude from those reported in the royal chronicles, per G.E. Harvey's analysis in his History of Burma (1925) in the section Numerical Note (pp. 333–335).): Ava: 13,000; Myaungmya: unknown; 1386–1387: Ava: 29,000; Myaungmya: unknown; 1389–1390: Myaungmya: 2,000+; 1390–1391: 29,000	1385–1386: Total unknown; 1,000+ (Pankyaw); 1386–1387: 6,500+; 1389–1390: Total unknown; 1,000+ (Daybathwe); 1390–1391: 13,000

Casualties and losses
Total unknown	Total unknown

The Ava–Hanthawaddy War (1385–1391) (Burmese: အင်းဝ–ဟံသာဝတီ စစ် (၁၃၈၅–၁၃၉၁)) was a military conflict between Ava and Hanthawaddy Pegu, both kingdoms located in present-day Myanmar, that lasted from 1385 to 1391. It was the first of the four decades-long wars between the two kingdoms. Hanthawaddy's victory over a far larger Ava in this war preserved the nascent kingdom's independence.

The war's immediate origins trace to Hanthawaddy's deep political turmoil following King Razadarit's contentious rise to power in 1384. The 16-year-old king, who had seized the throne after having raised a rebellion against his ailing father King Binnya U, faced several rebellions by his father's vassals. The crisis escalated in 1385 when Viceroy Laukpya of the Province of Myaungmya persuaded King Swa Saw Ke of Ava to put him on the Hanthawaddy throne. Swa underestimated Razadarit, and sent down two small armies led by his two young sons, Crown Prince Tarabya and Prince Min Swe. When his bickering sons came back empty-handed after a badly coordinated campaign five months later, Swa himself invaded with much larger land and riverine forces. Ava forces penetrated as far south as Dagon and Dala but they could not overcome formidable Hanthawaddy fortifications, and had to withdraw by mid 1387.

The two failed campaigns ushered a new entrant into the fray. Ava's longtime enemy Maw (Mong Mao) began raiding its northernmost districts, forcing Swa to suspend his southern operations until a truce with Maw was reached in 1389/90. Razadarit took full advantage and captured two provinces he did not yet control—Martaban and Myaungmya—as well as two border towns inside Ava territory by early 1390. In response, Swa launched another major invasion that year but his forces could not even get past the border. Faced with another embarrassing defeat, Swa grudgingly accepted Razadarit's peace offer, in which Ava agreed to recognize Pegu in exchange for Pegu returning the border towns. Tensions remained high until Swa withdrew his last regiments from the Tharrawaddy front later in 1391.

In the following decade, Hanthawaddy-Pegu under Razadarit's leadership became more unified, and grew to be a major regional power. On the other hand, Ava remained preoccupied with the Maw threat throughout the 1390s. When Ava entered into a succession crisis in 1400, Razadarit felt powerful enough that he invaded his larger and more populous northern neighbor, starting the Ava–Hanthawaddy War (1401–1403).

== Background ==
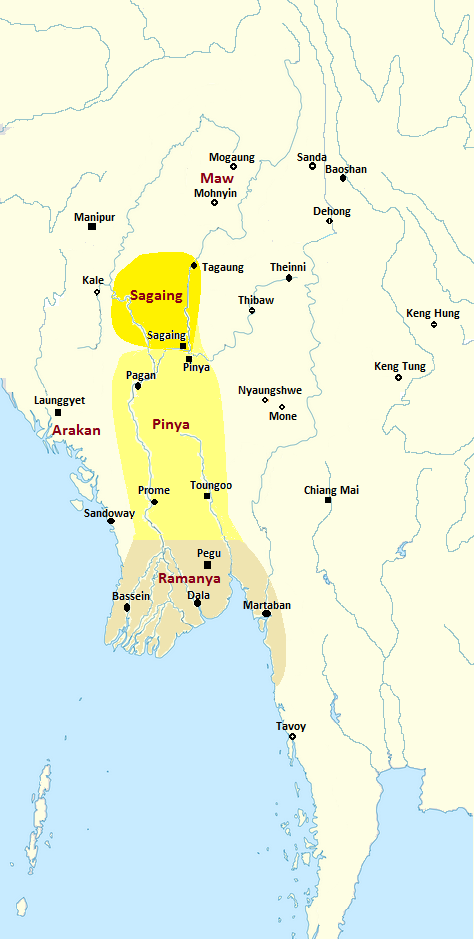
Political map of Burma c. 1350

The origins of the war trace back to the two kingdoms' lukewarm relationship since the early 1370s as well as Ava's long-running problems with its northern neighbor, Shan-speaking Maw (Mong Mao).

=== Emergence of Ava and Hanthawaddy Pegu ===
Both kingdoms emerged in the 1360s. The central-dry zone-based Ava was founded in 1365 as a remnant of the Pinya and Sagaing kingdoms, after Maw raids left the two kingdoms in tatters. When Ava's founder Thado Minbya died in 1367, his successor Swa Saw Ke inherited a largely embryonic polity that controlled few peripheral regions. On the southern coast, the polity based out of Pegu (Bago) came into being as a remnant of the Martaban Kingdom in 1369/70 when King Binnya U was forced to retreat to the hitherto provincial capital by his cousins Byattaba and Laukpya, who had waged a rebellion since 1364.

=== Early relations ===
It was during these turbulent times that the first peace treaty between the two rump kingdoms was signed in 1370/71. The initial proposal came from U, who wanted to keep his northern border quiet. Swa, who wanted U's assurance that Pegu would not help the former southern vassals of Pinya, accepted.

The treaty allowed both kings to focus on their domestic struggles. Though U regained Donwun from Byattaba in 1371, the king was soon forced to make peace when his cousins sought an intervention by the kingdom of Lan Na (in present-day northern Thailand). The king agreed to recognize them as the autonomous viceroys of Martaban and Myaungmya provinces, respectively; in return, the brothers agreed to nominally recognize U as their sovereign. (Note: As the Razadarit Ayedawbon recounts in (Pan Hla 2005: 63), U also agreed to "gift" his nominal vassals 10 viss (16.33 kg) of gold and ten elephants.)

Swa was far more successful in expanding his authority. He promptly went to war with Maw, and by 1373 had seized Kale (Kalay) and Myedu from Maw. (Note: (Than Tun 1959: 131): An Ava inscription dated 7 February 1375 triumphantly commemorates Swa's victory over the "heretic Shans".) Later in 1373 (or early 1374), he placed his nominee on the vacant throne of Arakan. He then plotted to replace Governor Pyanchi I of Toungoo, who he felt was too close to Pegu.

=== Deterioration of relations ===
The relations between the kingdoms suddenly cooled in 1375 when Pyanchi I revolted. According to the main royal chronicles, Pegu sent a sizable military force to Toungoo (Taungoo) to aid the rebellion. Ava had to send three separate expeditions to regain Toungoo in 1375–1376. However, the Razadarit Ayedawbon, the chronicle that covers the early Hanthawaddy period from the Hanthawaddy perspective, makes no mention of Pegu's support of Toungoo in any way during this period; instead, it portrays U as an ailing king whose effective authority amounted to a single province, not one capable of interfering in others' affairs. (Note: See (Pan Hla 2005 59–63) for the Razadarit Ayedawbon's narrative of Binnya U's reign, post-1370/71, which makes no mention of any support for Toungoo or any conflicts with Ava.) In any case, it was only in 1383 when Pegu was amidst a serious rebellion that Ava was able to install its preferred governor at the border state. The Ava regime watched on as Pegu's political instabilities worsened after Binnya U's death in 1384. Their subsequent decision to interfere in the southern kingdom's affairs would lead to war.

== Prelude to the war ==
=== Instabilities in Pegu ===
Pegu's succession crisis began in May 1383 when Prince Binnya Nwe raised a rebellion against his ailing father (and his aunt and adoptive mother Princess Maha Dewi). The young prince went on to seize the throne, after U's death in January 1384. However, the 16-year-old new king, now known by his regnal title Razadarit, could not get any of the key vassals outside his home province to acknowledge him. Governor Smin Sam Lek of Donwun, a Binnya U loyalist, deemed Razadarit a mere usurper while viceroys Byattaba of Martaban and Laukpya of Myaungmya, who had indirectly supported the prince's rebellion, refused to submit now that the rebellion had succeeded.

=== Laukpya's request ===
"... I, Laukpya, Lord of Myaungmya, bowed at thy feet, O king of the Golden Palace at Ava, and pray that thou march against Razadarit before he is firm upon his throne. I will bring men by water. When we have conquered him, do thou keep the heart-wood and leave me the bark."

— Viceroy Laukpya's letter to King Swa Saw Ke, per the Razadarit Ayedawbon

Laukpya in particular wanted to take over Pegu. Since he could not take on the most populous province on his own, he considered seeking Ava's help, just as the brothers sought Lan Na's help in the 1370s. However, Byattaba, whose territory bordered the Tai states to the east, demurred. Laukpya ultimately decided to act on his own, and sent an embassy to Ava in 1385, offering to hold Pegu as a vassal state.

His proposal greatly resonated with the Ava court, which was dealing with a developing situation in Arakan: Saw Me, the latest Ava-nominated king, had been driven out. Ultimately, the Ava court, led by Chief Minister Min Yaza, assessed Pegu as an easier mission. Swa, who wanted to restore the erstwhile Pagan Empire, accepted Laukpya's proposal, touching off what would become "the forty years' war between Ava and Pegu."

== First invasion (1385–1386) ==
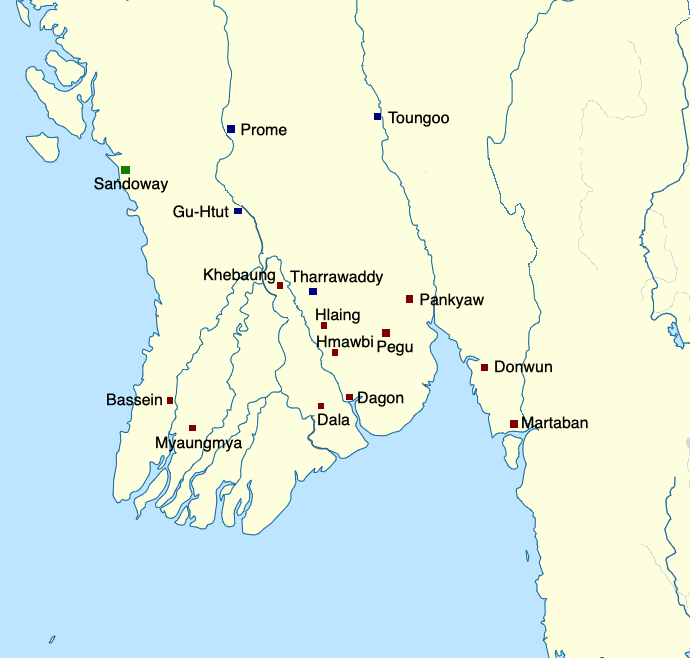
Ava and Pegu forces contested Hlaing, Hmawbi, and Pankyaw while Myaungmya's flotilla lurked near Dagon.

=== Ava battle plan ===
King Swa and his court saw little difficulty in taking over Pegu. Their battle plan reflected that belief: Swa assigned his two young sons with no prior military experience—Crown Prince Tarabya, who was about to turn 17, and Prince Min Swe of Pyinzi, who had recently turned 12 (Note: The main chronicles report Prince Tarabya's age as either about to turn 17 or already 17, and Prince Min Swe's as 13. Furthermore, the chronicles Maha Yazwin and Hmannan Yazawin say the invasion began in 1386 but the Yazawin Thit chronicle says it began in 1385. (Yazawin Thit Vol. 1 2012: 196): At the start of the invasion in 1385, Tarabya was about to enter his 18th year (i.e. turn 17), and Prince Min Swe was in his 14th year (i.e. aged 13). However, the chronicle's age for Prince Min Swe is an error. It has simply copied (Maha Yazawin Vol. 1 2006: 291)'s age of 14th year (aged 13) in 1386, without adjusting the age for 1385. Per the inscriptional evidence (Maha Yazawin Vol. 2 2006: 55, footnote), the prince was born on Tuesday, 12th waning of Thadingyut 735 ME (13 September 1373), meaning he was 12 before the start of the invasion. (Hmannan Vol. 1 2003: 417–418), which accepts the Maha Yazawin's 1386 date, reports Tarabya's age as already in his 18th year (17), and Min Swe's as 14th year (13).)—to lead two relatively small armies. The king did appoint two of his best generals, including Thilawa of Yamethin and Theinkhathu of Sagu, to advise the princes. The plan called for a three-pronged attack. The first army led by the crown prince (9 regiments, 7,000 infantry, 500 cavalry, 20 war elephants) was to invade the Sittaung River valley from Toungoo. Prince Swe's second army (9 regiments, 6,000 infantry, 500 cavalry, 20 elephants) was to invade from Tharrawaddy along the Hlaing river, and join up with Laukpya's Myaungmya flotilla invading from the delta around Dagon (modern downtown Yangon) in a pincer movement towards Pegu.

=== Pegu battle plan ===
Pegu's battle plan was shaped by its sheer lack of manpower. A desperate Razadarit sent a last-minute mission to Donwun in search of levies but Sam Lek ignored the request. In the end, the Pegu command had no choice but to defend from a few key fortified towns en route to the capital. On the northeastern front along the Sittaung river, Hanthawaddy's main defenses began only at Fort Pankyaw (modern Waw), (Note: (Maha Yazawin Vol. 1 2006: 291, footnote 1): Near the town of Sittaung.) about 40 km (25 mi) northeast of Pegu. On the northwestern and western fronts, a series of smaller forts at Hlaing (modern Taikkyi), Hmawbi, and Dagon defended the route towards Pegu.

=== Invasion ===
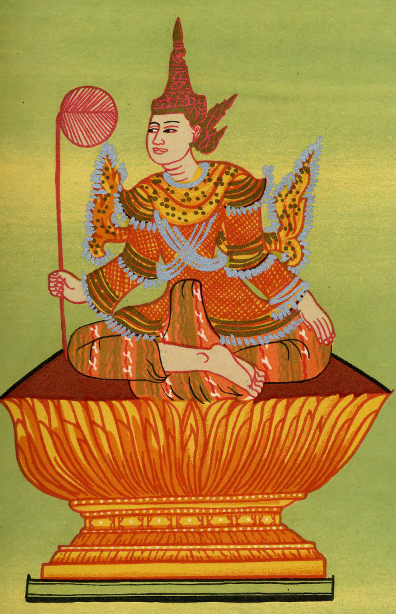
A depiction of Crown Prince Tarabya, who led the first invasion

==== Grinding advance ====
The invasion began in December 1385. (Note: Various chronicles present different dates. (Maha Yazawin Vol. 1 2006: 290) and (Hmannan Vol. 1 2003: 417) say the first invasion was launched in 748 ME (1386/87); (Yazawin Thit Vol. 1 2012: 195) says the invasion began in 747 ME (1385/86); the Razadarit Ayedawbon (Pan Hla 2005: 164) suggests that the invasion began in the dry season following Razadarit's accession, i.e. 746 ME (1384/85). Furthermore, the invasion likely began in December. All the main chronicles (Maha Yazawin Vol. 1 2006: 293), (Yazawin Thit Vol. 1 2012: 197), (Hmannan Vol. 1 2003: 420) say the invasion lasted over five months and had to be called off because the rainy season was fast approaching.) Contrary to their expectations, both armies faced determined resistance from the start. On the northeastern front, Tarabya's army steadily advanced along the Sittaung until it reached Pankyaw. It laid siege to the fort but could not take it for weeks. On the northwestern front, Prince Min Swe's army ran into resistance much earlier at Hlaing (Taikkyi). It had to lay siege to the fort, and finally took the fort only after weeks of heavy fighting. The fall of Hlaing prompted Razadarit to come out of Pegu with an army to reinforce his defenses at Hmawbi. A vanguard regiment of the Ava's second army reached Hmawbi first but the regiment withdrew after its commander, Min Letwe of Pinle, fell in action. Soon after, Tarabya finally took Pankyaw after the fort's commander Nandameit fell in action. Laukpya now began sailing towards Dagon with his flotilla of war boats. (Note: Apparently, Laukpya's forces had not done any fighting thus far. The first explicit mention of the Myaungmya flotilla (led by Laukpya, his sons and sons-in-law) comes after Pankyaw fell to Tarabya's forces per (Pan Hla 2005: 166).)

==== Chasing Razadarit ====
Tarabya's road to Pegu was now open. The crown prince assigned the Lord of Myede to guard Pankyaw, and marched towards Pegu. But when he learned that Razadarit had evacuated Pegu, Tarabya assessed that Razadarit had retreated to Dagon, and ordered all forces including those of Min Swe and Laukpya to converge around Dagon. It turned out to be a miscalculation. Razadarit had not retreated to Dagon, and was still outside of Pegu. When Ava forces marched on to Dagon, Razadarit swiftly marched to Pankyaw to cut off Ava's rear. The Ava command did not learn about Razadarit's siege of Pankyaw until their forces met up near Dagon. Both Ava armies now rushed back to Pankyaw, about 120 km (75 mi) from Dagon but by the time they got there, Pankyaw had just fallen to Razadarit's forces.

Ava forces now tried to corner Razadarit. Tarabya and his cavalry came face to face with Razadarit's main regiment outside Pankyaw, with the Hanthawaddy king himself leading the charge on his favorite war elephant. In the ensuing battle, a few of the Ava cavalry even got near the king's elephant and cut the elephant's tail but Razadarit managed to break through. Min Swe's army chased the Hanthawaddy king, and caught up with the king near a small town named Hsin. Tarabya ordered Min Swe to hold the position in the path of retreat, and not engage the enemy until his army could catch up. However, the 12-year-old prince was angered by his half-brother's order, and going against the advice of his commanders, ordered his troops to engage. His commanders reluctantly moved forward in a state of confusion. Razadarit's army broke through, and made it back to Pegu.

==== Withdrawal ====
The battle turned out to be the last of the campaign, which had already lasted more than five months. It was May 1386, and the rainy season was imminent. Tarabya was furious at both Min Swe, who had disobeyed his express order, and at Laukpya, who he thought had provided little help. Still, he was reluctant to return empty-handed; he discussed his options with his high command for another five days. In the end, Tarabya decided to withdraw for the rainy season, vowing to return after the rainy season. Laukpya and his flotilla, which had been lurking outside Dagon, also turned back.

== First interlude (1386) ==
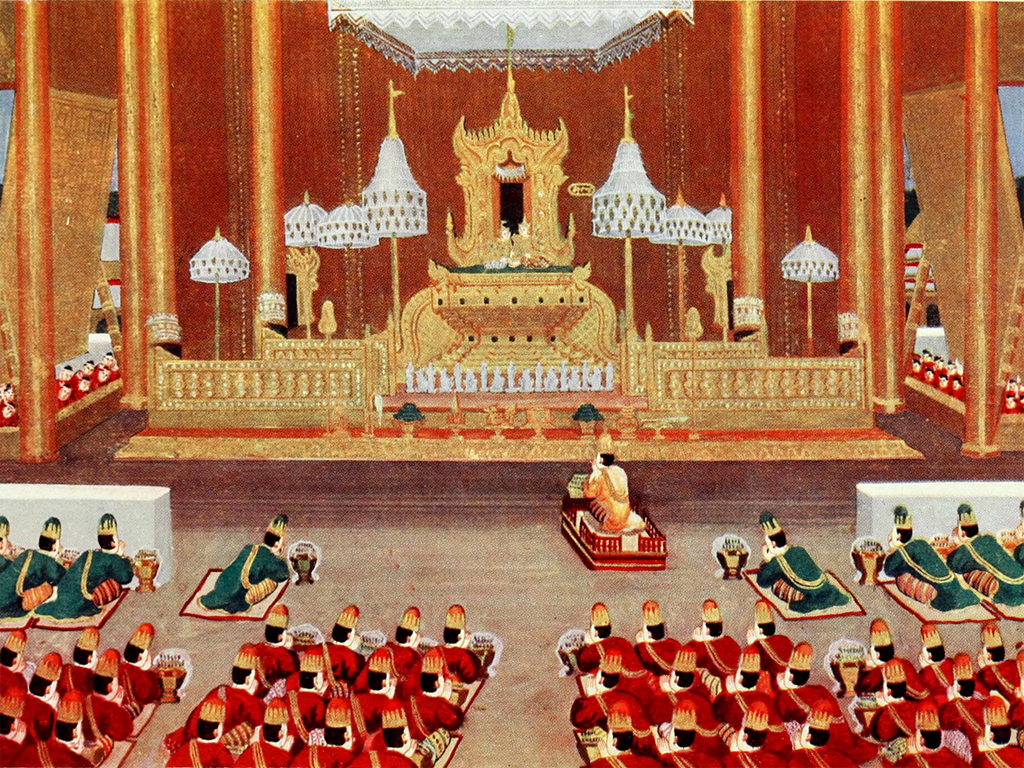
A 19th-century Burmese painting depicting a royal audience

The rainy season saw competing diplomatic missions to Ava from both Pegu and Myaungmya. The Pegu mission arrived two months after the withdrawal (c. July 1386), bearing lavish gifts and a conciliatory letter directly addressed to King Swa Saw Ke from King Razadarit. Despite having survived the first invasion, the Hanthawaddy king had agreed to his court's recommendation to sue for peace with the more populous northern neighbor. In the letter, Razadarit, using respectful language—he addressed Swa, "Royal Paternal Elder Uncle"—asked the Ava king to honor the terms of the peace treaty Swa and his father signed back in 1370/71, and treat him with mercy.

In response, Laukpya hastily sent a delegation of his own to Ava to keep the alliance intact. In his letter to Swa, Laukpya humbly but also subtly pointed out that the failure of the campaign was due to a lack of coordination between the Ava armies, and that a better planned, coordinated campaign would certainly bring victory. After one month of deliberation, Swa and the court concluded that Pegu was still winnable outright. Swa rejected Razadarit's proposal, and planned to lead the next invasion by himself.

== Second invasion (1386–1387) ==
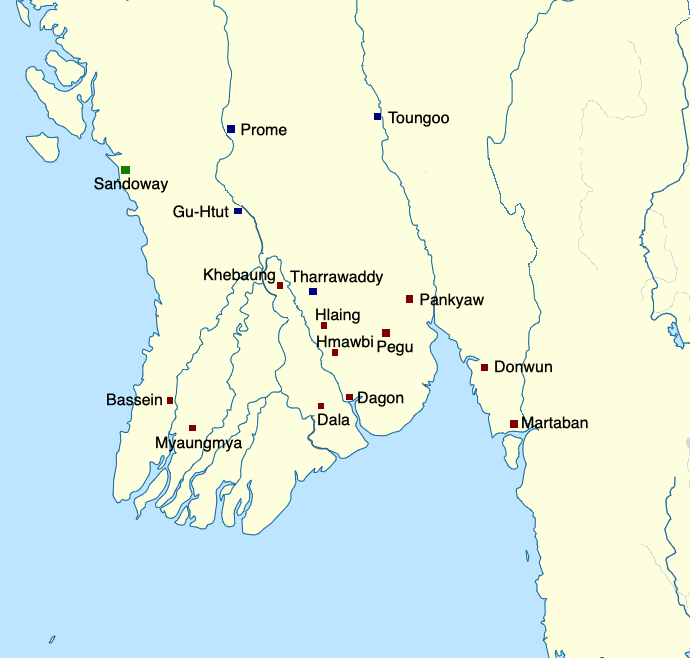
The route of the second invasion along the Hlaing river: Hlaing, Hmawbi, Dagon and Dala

=== Ava battle plan ===
The new battle plan differed from the previous plan in two key aspects. First, the invasion forces were now two and a half times larger. Swa had called up levies from around the kingdom, raising over 29,000 troops, including two Shan regiments. Secondly, the path of invasion for both the land and riverine forces would now be along the Irrawaddy front. The land army (11 regiments, 12,000 infantry, 600 cavalry, 40 elephants) commanded by Crown Prince Tarabya was to invade by land from Tharrawaddy. The riverine force (10 regiments, 17,000 troops, 100 transport boats/ships, 120 war boats) commanded by King Swa himself would attack the southern ports via the delta. Prince Min Swe was left out of the campaign; the prince was assigned to guard the capital Ava, with four regiments under his command. In preparation, the combined invasion forces met up in Prome (Pyay). Supplies had been shipped there as well. Then, Swa's riverine force then sailed down to a place called Ahlwe (near Myanaung). There, Laukpya's flotilla came up to join the riverine force.

=== Pegu battle plan ===
Razadarit was prepared. Though he had raised more troops—his main army alone now consisted of 6,000 troops and 20 elephants— his plan again was to outlast the invaders from inside the walls. All the key towns along the invasion route, including Hlaing, Hmawbi, Dagon and Dala (modern Twante) were heavily fortified. To defend Hlaing, the first fort, he assigned Dein Mani-Yut and Smin Ye-Thin-Yan, with 500 troops.

=== Invasion ===
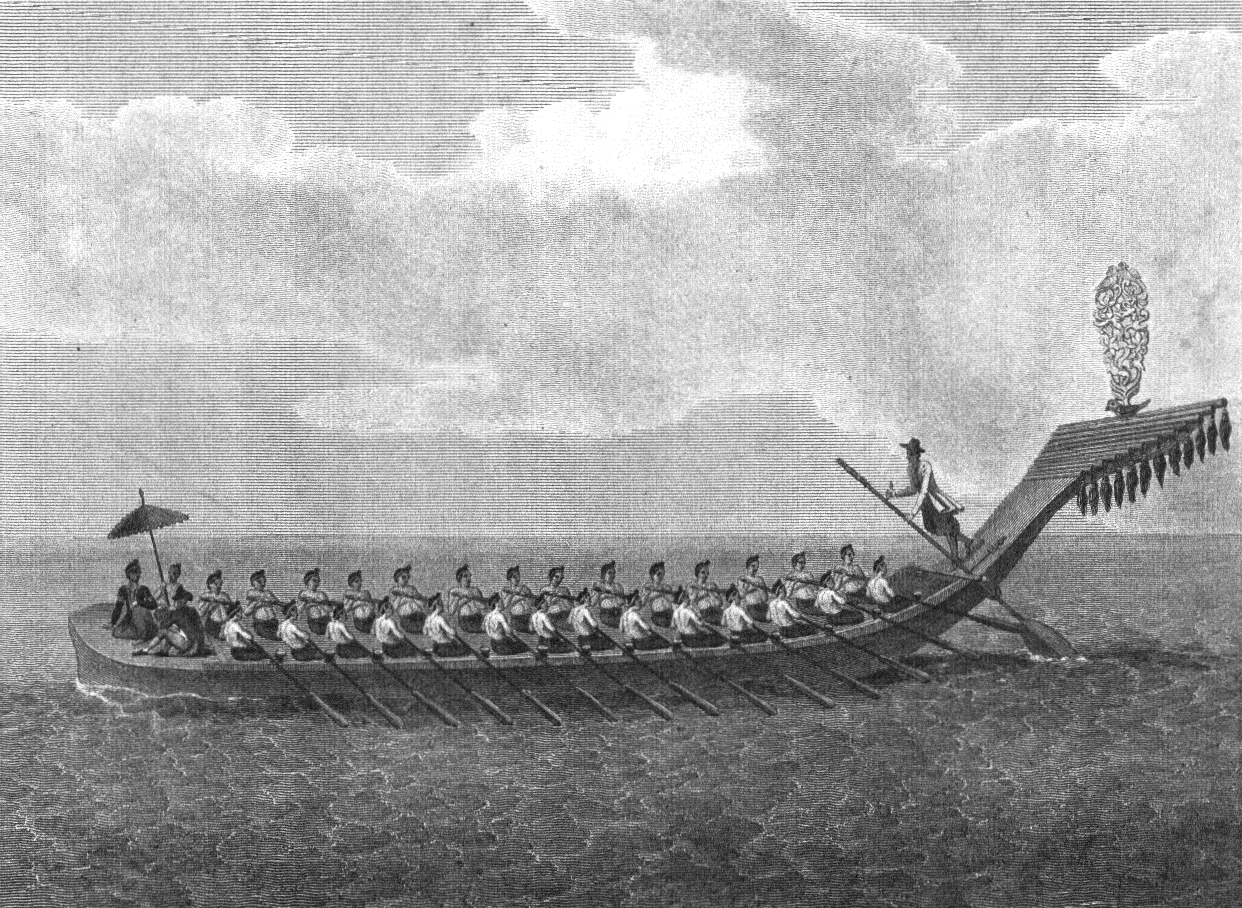
An 18th-century painting of a Burmese war boat on the Irrawaddy River

In late 1386, Ava forces invaded by the Irrawaddy River and by land. Tarabya's army went on to attack the first two Hanthawaddy garrisons, Hlaing (Taikkyi) and Hmawbi. Two vanguard regiments, led by Thray Thinkhaya of Pinle and Thray Waduna of Pinya, took Hmawbi but Tarabya's main army could not take Hlaing (Taikkyi). The crown prince launched three frontal assaults but Dein's defenses held. One month into the campaign, Tarabya was forced to continue the siege. Meanwhile, Swa's riverine forces were in the same situation. They too were laying siege to a string of southern ports at the edge of the delta, Dagon and Dala in particular. Yet, despite the overwhelming numerical superiority, Ava forces could not take any of the fortified towns. The uneasy status quo ensued for the next few months, and many of the Ava troops began suffering from disease.

=== Pegu's counterattack ===
It was during the stalemate that Razadarit launched a surprise counterattack on Hmawbi c. April 1387. (Note: (Yazawin Thit Vol. 1 2012: 199): One month before the rainy season, and the withdrawal) When Razadarit showed up near the fort with a small battalion (70 troops), the fort's commanders, Thray Thinkhaya and Thray Waduna, thought it was an itinerant detachment, and decided to come out of the gates to chase them away. But the commanders had not considered that the detachment was a decoy. The Hanthawaddy army was 6,000 strong, and outnumbered the fort's defenses by three to one. When the Ava troops voluntarily came out of the gates, Hanthawaddy forces, led by the 19-year-old king on his war elephant, pounced. Total carnage ensued. The two Ava commanders on their war elephants managed to escape but most of Ava troops could not and were slaughtered. The fort itself was burned to the ground.

=== Withdrawal ===
The fall of Hmawbi foretold the fate of the campaign. Chronicles report that King Swa was visibly shaken by the news but he was not yet ready to call off the campaign. He reshuffled the troops to relieve the ailing men but it did not change the situation in any way. One month later, with the rainy season approaching, Swa finally agreed to withdraw. Like Tarabya before him, Swa too vowed to return.

Having survived the second invasion, the Hanthawaddy command was now more self-assured. At Pegu, a confident Hanthawaddy king vowed in front of Ava prisoners of war that King Swa mistakenly refused his offer of peace, and that the king of Ava himself would be his next target.

== Second interlude (1387–1389) ==
Despite Swa's vow to return to the south, he could not do so for the next three years. He was preoccupied by a renewed conflict with Maw (Mong Mao) in the north. Razadarit used this hiatus to reunify the provinces of the old Martaban Kingdom, starting with the Martaban province.

=== Resumption of Ava–Maw war ===
Ava's stunning failures in the south did not go unnoticed. In 1387, Maw, which had not challenged Ava's northern border since 1373, began raiding Kale's territory, prompting the sawbwa of Kale to request help from Swa. After weighing the competing demands, Swa concluded that the developing situation must be taken care of first, and ordered an expedition to the north in the following 1387–1388 dry season. Like its recent southern campaigns, this too was inconclusive. The Ava army advanced as far north as Mohnyin but could not root out the instigators. The conflict remained unresolved for another two years.

=== Pegu's conquest of the Martaban province ===
Meanwhile, Ava's problems in the north gave Pegu an opening. Realizing that they needed to control as many resources as possible to fend off Ava in the long run, Razadarit and his staff set out to reunify the provinces.

Their initial goal was to gain control of the northern Martaban province, centered around Donwun, the ancestral home of the dynasty. In late 1387, Razadarit marched to Donwun, and asked Governor Sam Lek who was not allied with Byattaba, to come over to his side. But when Sam Lek refused, Razadarit occupied the nearby towns of Tari and Than-Maung to isolate Donwun. This drew Byattaba into the conflict. The ruler of Martaban sent an army to retake the towns but Hanthawaddy defenses led by Than-Byat and Than-Lon repelled the attacks.

After the Martaban attacks died down, the Pegu army returned to Donwun. Although Sam Lek still refused to submit, Razadarit managed to take the town after a ruse led to the opening of the town's gates. (Note: (Pan Hla 2005: 172–173): The Pegu commander Smin Ye-Thin-Yan pretended to have defected to Sam Lek's side. As Ye-Thin-Yan was a thwethauk comrade of his, Sam Lek accepted the defection. But Ye-Thin-Yan and his men later opened the gates at a predetermined time. Razadarit's forces took the town.) When the army marched to the next town of Lagun Byi, the ruler of Than-Maung, who had submitted only months earlier, revolted. The army had to retake Than-Maung after it had taken Lagun Byi. In the end, Razadarit had conquered all the northern districts of Martaban; only the southern districts—the city of Martaban and its satellite Moulmein—remained out of his reach.

Martaban was next. His father had not been able to retake the heavily fortified city (and former royal capital) from Byattaba in 1364–1371 but Razadarit was undeterred. In the following dry season, he sent an army of seven regiments to Martaban. Instead of defending from the inside of his city's fortifications, Byattaba decided to ambush the Hanthawaddy army en route. In the subsequent battle, the Hanthawaddy army was nearly defeated but the two rearguard regiments led by Than-Byat and Dein managed to drive out Byattaba and his senior staff from the battlefield. The army then raced to Martaban where the city's defenders surrendered without a fight. The rest of the southern vassals also submitted, giving Razadarit control of the entire Martaban province. The campaign ended in 1388 (or early 1389). (Note: The Razadarit Ayedawbon (Pan Hla 2005: 178) simply says Martaban and Moulmein were captured in 750 ME (29 March 1388 to 28 March 1389). Although the dry season usually spanned from November to May, the brevity of the campaign, a single battle, suggests that the battle may have taken place in late 1388.)

== Pegu's conquest of the Irrawaddy delta (1389–1390) ==
=== Prelude ===
Despite Pegu's growing strength, Ava did not act. It sent no help to Laukpya even as Razadarit prepared to invade the delta. For his part, Laukpya was prepared to take on Razadarit, even without Ava's help. He had heavily fortified the province's two main cities, Myaungmya and Bassein, and appointed his ablest sons—Ma Pyit-Nwe at Myaungmya, and Lauk Shein, Bya Kun, and Bya Kyin (Note: The names of Bassein's three commanders are reported as Lauk Shein, Bya Kun (later known as Nawrahta) and Bya Kyin (later Letya Pyanchi) according to the Burmese language Razadarit Ayedawbon chronicle per (Fernquest 2006: 8). In Pan Hla's version of the chronicle, (Pan Hla 2005: 178, 190), which also includes the narratives of the Mon language Pak Lat Chronicles, the governor's name was Lauk Na-Rein, and his deputies' names were Lauk Yon and Lauk Thein.) at Bassein—to defend them. Furthermore, he had also secretly persuaded Governor Nyi Kan-Kaung of Dala (modern Twante), the border district between the two provinces, to come over to his side. (Note: The Razadarit (Pan Hla 2005: 178) simply says Nyi Kan-Kaung switched sides. It does not explain why Nyi Kan-Kaung, who was Razadarit's earliest, most steadfast supporters, decided to switch sides.)

However, Razadarit soon learned of the alliance through one of his informants. After a period of clandestine preparations, he suddenly launched an attack, and occupied the border town. He also had Kan-Kaung, who was not only his half-brother but also one of his earliest supporters, executed. Pegu's path to the delta was now open. Aware of the formidable defenses at both Myaungmya and Bassein, the Pegu command ultimately decided to attack Bassein first as they believed it would be relatively easier.

=== Invasion ===
==== Battle of Bassein ====
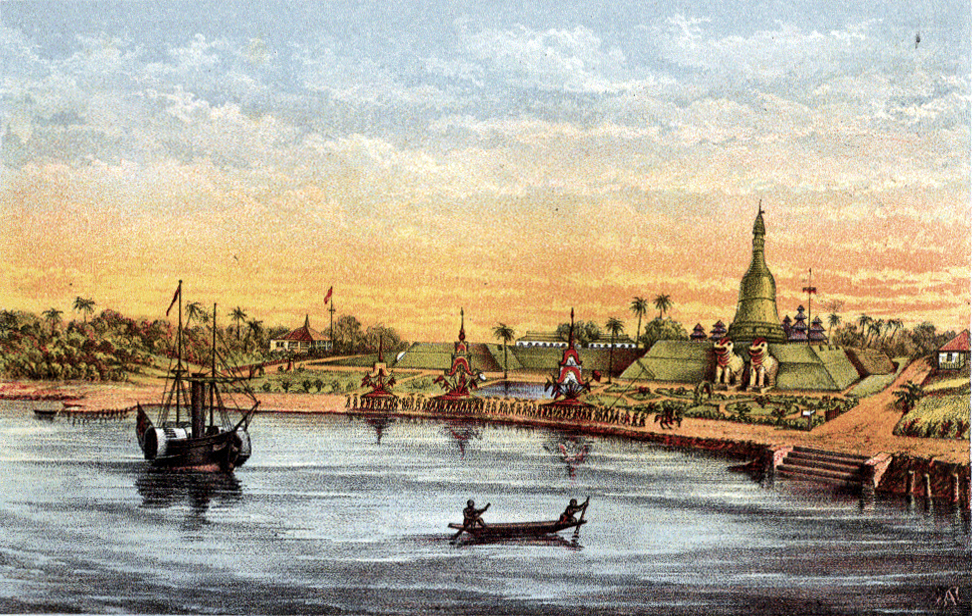
A 19th-century painting of Bassein's shoreline

In late 1389, Razadarit invaded the delta from Dala. His forces had no trouble advancing until they got near Bassein, which was defended by 1,000 troops and 50+ war boats in the Bassein River. Some of the war boats were manned by foreign mercenaries with "guns". (Note: (Phayre 1967: 69, footnote 1): The "gun" here probably was "a jingal, a metal tube about three feet long, mounted on a wooden stand, and throwing a ball, generally less than one pound weight". (Fernquest 2006: 8): The foreign mercenaries here likely referred to Indian Ocean Muslim mercenaries.) The king ordered repeated frontal assaults but the city's defenses repelled the charges each time, inflicting heavy casualties on the Hanthawaddy troops. Razadarit finally called off the attacks after one of his frontline commanders, Yaza Manu, was felled atop his war elephant by a gun shot.

The Pegu command was in a quandary. Razadarit acknowledged that he had severely misjudged the relative strength of Bassein, and that his degraded forces were in no shape to take on Myaungmya's even stronger defenses. Yet he was not ready to end the campaign. His senior staff, led by Byat Za and Dein Mani-Yut, argued that the only way they might have a chance at victory was if they could entice the enemy to come out of their fortified cities. The king agreed, and ordered his troops to withdraw into the main corridor between Bassein and Myaungmya, which were about 50 km (31 mi) apart, with the hope that the enemy forces would come after them.

==== Battles of Pan Hlaing and Daybathwe ====
According to the plan, the Pegu forces set up a trap about midway between the cities in the Pan Hlaing river. (Note: The Razadarit Ayedawbon (Pan Hla 2005: 184) identifies the "river" as Pan Hlaing, which today flows into the Hlaing river, near Yangon. Since, the chronicle also says the river was between Bassein and Myaungmya, it may have referred to a tributary of the Pathein (Bassein) river or the river itself.) Razadarit had stakes planted across the river with just enough spacing so that his navy's smaller war boats could pass through but Bassein's and Myaungmya's larger war boats could not. He sent a squadron of war boats led by Lagun Ein to lure Bassein's war boats to pursue them to the location of the trap. It worked. Bassein's naval flotilla pursued Lagun Ein's squadron until the pursuers ran aground at Pan Hlaing, where they were ambushed from both sides by more Hanthwaddy war boats in the wings. Most of the Bassein troops were taken prisoner.

The small victory kept the campaign alive. Their next target was Daybathwe, a small fort en route to Myaungmya. As part of the plan to draw out the enemy from behind the walls, Razadarit and his main army first retreated to Dala. Dein, with his 1,000-man regiment stayed behind, and sent a letter to the fort's commander Saw E Binnya, another of Laukpya's sons, that he had defected and wanted to join the Myaungmya side. Though initially skeptical, Saw E Binnya ultimately decided that the request was genuine, and came out of the main gate on his war elephant and 20 guards to meet Dein, also on his war elephant, and 100 guards. When their elephants got side-by-side, Dein suddenly attacked Binnya, and killed him on the spot. Hanthawaddy troops, lurking behind, got in before the gate was closed, and captured the fort.

After the treacherous capture, Razadarit returned to the front with the main army. The combined forces then marched to Myaungmya.

==== Battle of Myaungmya ====
The Myaungmya command was unfazed. Indeed, Commander Pyit-Nwe was so confident of their strength that he believed that his forces could easily defeat the enemy in an open battle, and settle the affairs once and for all. He even sent a letter to Razadarit, urging the king to participate in the upcoming battle. In what turned out to be a major mistake, which one historian called Myaungmya becoming "too venturesome after success", Myaungmya forces voluntarily came out of their fortified defenses to engage the enemy. As the opposing forces clashed right outside the city's gates, Razadarit and Pyit-Nwe eventually became entangled, fighting an impromptu duel on their respective war elephants. In the subsequent battle, both sustained wounds but Razadarit emerged victorious when Pyit-Nwe was thrown off his elephant, and captured by the Hanthawaddy infantry nearby. (Note: (Pan Hla 2005: 189–190): Razadarit sustained a cut in his forehead, and Pyit-Nwe lost one of his ears.) Myaungmya defenses simply folded. Laukpya tried to flee but was soon caught. Over 1,000 Myaungmya troops surrendered.

Razadarit spared Laukpya's life but not Pyit-Nwe's. He had asked Pyit-Nwe to join his service but the commander remained defiant, and asked to be executed instead. The king reluctantly obliged.

==== Sweep of the delta ====
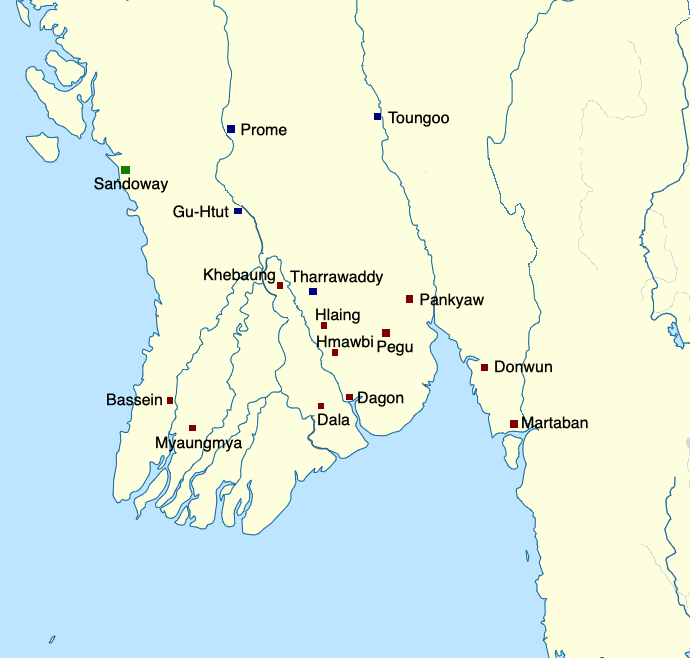
Hanthawaddy forces occupied up to Gu-Htut in 1390.

Two days after Myaungmya's fall, Razadarit marched to Bassein. This time, Lauk Shein decided to flee. He took "elephant loads of gold and silver", and left for Prome (Pyay), Ava's southernmost garrison. Razadarit dispatched Dein and Byat Za to intercept Lauk Shein, forcing him to change course to Sandoway (Thandwe), 300 km (190 mi) northwest of Bassein, in Arakan. Byat Za followed up, and laid siege to Sandoway until the town's ruler gave up Lauk Shein and his elephant loads of treasures. Lauk Shein was subsequently executed on Razadarit's order.

Meanwhile, Hanthawaddy forces fanned out to subdue the rest of the delta. By the end of March 1390, they had occupied up to Khebaung (north of modern Hinthada). It was a total rout. Of the old Laukpya installed rulers, only Laukpya's son Bya Kun and son-in-law Bya Kyin escaped to Ava. After a period of regrouping, Razadarit and his staff decided to take Ava's southernmost border towns for strategic reasons. The king sent a regiment and a naval squadron to occupy Gu-Htut (present-day Myan-Aung) and nearby Ahlwe.

== Third invasion (1390–1391) ==
=== Prelude ===
The occupation of Gu-Htut proved to be a provocation Ava could not overlook. Moreover, Ava and Maw had agreed to a truce, which included a marriage of state between Swa's second eldest son Prince Min Swe and King Tho Ngan Bwa of Maw's daughter Shin Mi-Nauk. Swa now ordered a renewed campaign to the south. As with the second invasion, Ava forces would invade by land and the river. One difference from the second invasion was that the army (12,000 infantry, 1,000 cavalry, 80 elephants) commanded by Crown Prince Tarabya would revert to invading from the Toungoo front (as opposed to from the Tharrawaddy front). Swa's riverine force (17,000 troops, 200 transport boats/ships, 80 war boats) was to attack via the Irrawaddy. As the Maw threat remained in the north, Ava did not include any northern regiments; all its forces were drawn from central to southern districts.

Razadarit was ready. With all three provinces under his control, he had raised over 13,000 troops, his largest ever. He had assigned Smin Than-Kye to lead the defense of Gu-Htut with 5,000 troops and 150 war boats while he himself would lead the defense of the Pegu capital region with his main army (8,000 troops and 40 elephants) from Fort Pankyaw.

=== Invasion ===
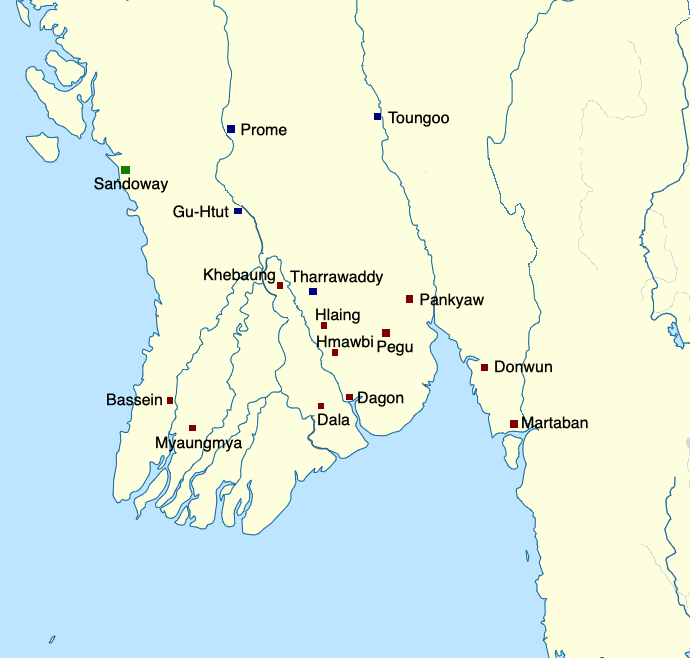
In their third invasion, Ava forces could not get past Gu-Htut in the west, and Pankyaw in the east.

The invasion began in late 1390, and it got bogged down from the outset. On the Irrawaddy front, Ava's war boats repeatedly attacked Gu-Htut but could not break through Hanthawaddy naval defenses. Getting impatient, Swa himself joined in on one of the attacks. It was a mistake. One Hanthawaddy squadron, commanded by Maha Thamun, managed to get close enough to Swa's own royal war boat to capture the gold ornaments from the side of the royal boat. After the close call, Swa called off the attacks.

The Pegu front was no better. Tarabya had advanced to Pankyaw but could not take the fort. With nothing to show for on both fronts, Swa was forced to reassess the situation. Retreat still was not an option but Swa recalibrated his aims to regaining his territories.

=== Peace agreement and withdrawal ===
It was during the stalemate that the initial peace offer came from Pegu. The offer was the result of the efforts of Maha Thamun, who recognized that Swa needed a face-saving way out. The commander initially sent a letter to Razadarit and the Pegu court urging them to sue for peace with Ava from a position of strength. He persuaded Razadarit to return Gu-Htut in exchange for Ava's recognition of Pegu. The king agreed, and appointed Maha Thamun to lead a four-person delegation. At the Ava camp, Maha Thamun presented King Swa the proposal letter from King Razadarit. It was a highly conciliatory letter but written on equal terms.

In the end, Swa accepted Razadarit's terms. Ava agreed to renounce its claims on all territories of Pegu, and recognize Pegu while Pegu agreed to return Gu-Htut and Ahlwe. Both sides also agreed to return each other's prisoners of war. When the news of the agreement reached the Pegu front, Razadarit and Tarabya exchanged gifts, and Tarabya withdrew. On the Irrawaddy front, after Hanthawaddy forces evacuated Gu-Htut, Swa deployed a garrison led by Zeya Gamani and Yaza Nawrahta.

Both sides remained on guard. Later in 1391, (Note: The Tharrawaddy deployment took place either c. April 1391 or c. November 1391. The main chronicles (Maha Yazawin Vol. 1 2006: 302), (Yazawin Thit Vol. 1 2012: 204) and (Hmannan Vol. 1 2003: 432) only say that the Ava troops were sent down to Tharrawaddy in 753 ME (30 March 1391 to 28 March 1392). Their narratives are not clear as to when the deployment took place: before the rainy season (April–May 1391), or at the start of the next dry season (c. November 1391). On the other hand, the Razadarit Ayedawbon (Pan Hla 2005: 203) says that the Tharrawaddy face-off took place soon after the Ava troops retreated to Prome, before the month of Kason (April/May).) after withdrawing his troops to Prome, Swa sent 2,000 troops back to Tharrawaddy by the border, ostensibly to look for a white elephant. Only when Razadarit quickly returned to the border with a sizable force, did Swa recall his troops to deescalate the situation. The fragile peace held.

== Aftermath ==
Peace held for another decade. Pegu developed into a full-fledged regional power while Ava remained preoccupied with the Maw threat. Ava's troubles in the north resurfaced just one year later. In 1392, Maw forces led by the sawbwa of Mohnyin invaded, routed Ava's northernmost garrison at Myedu, and advanced as far south as 30 km (19 mi), northwest of Sagaing. But the overstretched invaders were decisively defeated by Ava defenses led by Governor Thilawa of Yamethin. The victory stopped further brazen invasions but the border situation remained tense. Ava even sent three missions to the Chinese Ming court (in 1393, 1395 and 1396) (Note: (Aye Chan 2006: 94): The first mission arrived at the imperial court on 14 April 1393; the second mission in December 1395, and the third, four months later, c. April 1396.) to contain their common enemy Maw/Mong Mao. In the end, Ava got little reprieve as the Ming government itself could not establish firm control of its Yunnan borderlands until 1398.

Meanwhile, Razadarit had now emerged as a bona fide power, and was recognized as such. Ayutthaya (Siam), which in the past had claimed as far north as Martaban, offered recognition on equal terms. King Ramesuan even sent a white elephant, a symbol of Southeast Asian monarchs, to Razadarit. On the domestic front, Razadarit faced no challenges to his power. His administration consisted mainly of ministers from his father's court led by Dein Mani-Yut, Byat Za, Zeik-Bye and Maha Thamun. With their help, he instituted a more cohesive administrative system across the newly unified kingdom. The administrative reforms, combined with peaceful conditions, transformed the kingdom into a major power. By 1400, Pegu "had grown in economic and political power", greatly benefiting from the growth in chiefly maritime trade with South India, Ayutthaya, Malacca and maritime Southeast Asia, and Ming China. So confident was Razadarit of his kingdom's strengths that when Ava entered into a prolonged succession crisis in 1400–1401, the Hanthawaddy king decided to invade a much larger Ava, touching off the Ava–Hanthawaddy War (1401–1403).

== Historiography ==
The war is covered extensively in several royal chronicles. The Razadarit Ayedawbon is the earliest extant chronicle that reports on the war, and its coverage is from the perspective of Hanthawaddy Pegu. (Note: See (Aung-Thwin 2017: 250–253) and (Fernquest 2006: 3–9) for the authors' use of the Razadarit Ayedawbon to provide coverage from Pegu's perspective.) The chronicle Maha Yazawin is the first chronicle that covers the war from Ava's perspective. (Note: See (Aung-Thwin 2017: 254): "U Kala's perspective, from Upper Myanmar...", and (Fernquest 2006: 3): "the Burmese chronicle, which adds detail from Ava’s Upper Burma perspective. U Kala’s Mahayazawingyi, one of the first and most complete versions of the Burmese historical chronicle, will be used here (U Kala, 1961).")

Event	Razadarit Ayedawbon (c. 1560s)	Maha Yazawin (1724)	Yazawin Thit (1798)	Hmannan Yazawin (1832)	Scholarship
First invasion	date not mentioned (Note: The narrative of the first invasion in (Pan Hla 2005: 164–167) does not mention any dates as to when the invasion took place.)	1386–1387 (Note: (Maha Yazawin Vol. 1 2006: 290, 293): Begins in 748 ME (30 March 1386 to 29 March 1387); ends over 5 months later, near the start of the rainy season (c. May 1388).)	1385–1386 (Note: (Yazawin Thit Vol. 1 2012: 195, 197): 747 ME (29 March 1385 to 29 March 1384); ends over 5 months later, near the start of the rainy season (c. May 1387).)	1386–1387 (Note: (Hmannan Vol. 1 2003: 417, 420): Begins in 748 ME (30 March 1386 to 29 March 1387); ends over 5 months later, near the start of the rainy season (c. May 1388).)	1385 (Note: (Harvey 1925: 82), (Htin Aung 1967: 88), (Lieberman 2003: 135): Began in 1385); 1386 (Note: (Fernquest Spring 2006: 6) reports the Maha Yazawin's starting date.)
Second invasion	date not mentioned (Note: The narrative of the second invasion in (Pan Hla 2005: 169–171) does not mention any dates as to when the invasion took place.)	1387–1388 (Note: (Maha Yazawin Vol. 1 2006: 295, 297): Begins in 749 ME (30 March 1387 to 29 March 1388); ends near the start of the rainy season (c. May 1388).)	1386–1387 (Note: (Yazawin Thit Vol. 1 2012: 198): Begins in 748 ME (30 March 1386 to 29 March 1387); ends near the start of the rainy season (c. May 1387).)	1387–1388 (Note: (Hmannan Vol. 1 2003: 422, 424): Begins in 749 ME (30 March 1387 to 29 March 1388); ends near the start of the rainy season (c. May 1388).)	
Beginning of Ava–Maw war	not mentioned	not mentioned	1387/88 (Note: (Yazawin Thit Vol. 1 2012: 200): 749 ME (30 March 1387 to 29 March 1388), citing a contemporary inscription.)	not mentioned	
Hanthawaddy's Martaban campaigns	c. 1388–1389 (Note: The Razadarit does not explicitly say when the Martaban campaigns began; (Pan Hla 2005: 178) only says the Martaban province was conquered in 750 ME (29 March 1388 – 29 March 1389).)	not mentioned	not mentioned	not mentioned	
Hanthawaddy's Irrawaddy delta campaign	c. 1389–1390 (Note: The Razadarit does not explicitly say when the delta campaign began or ended. However its narrative of the delta campaign implies that the campaign took place in the subsequent 1389–1390 dry season. (Pan Hla 2005: 178) says that the delta campaign began after Razadarit had conquered the Martaban province in 750 ME (29 March 1388 – 29 March 1389). (Pan Hla 2005: 193–194) also says that Razadarit returned from the delta and held his second coronation ceremony in 752 ME (30 March 1390 – 29 March 1391). This means the campaign likely began in 751 ME (30 March 1389 – 29 March 1390) as per the main Burmese chronicles.)	1389–1390 (Note: (Maha Yazawin Vol. 1 2006: 299, 300): Begins in 751 ME (30 March 1389 – 29 March 1390), and ends in 752 ME (30 March 1390 – 29 March 1391).)	1389–1390 (Note: (Yazawin Thit Vol. 1 2012: 200, 201): Begins in 751 ME (30 March 1389 – 29 March 1390), and ends in 752 ME (30 March 1390 – 29 March 1391).)	1389–1390 (Note: (Hmannan Vol. 1 2003: 427, 429): Begins in 751 ME (30 March 1389 – 29 March 1390), and ends in 752 ME (30 March 1390 – 29 March 1391).)	1390 (Note: (Harvey 1925: 85): The campaign ends in 1390.)
Ava–Maw truce	not mentioned	1389/90 (Note: The Maha Yazawin (Maha Yazawin Vol. 1 2006: 297) only says Ava and Maw entered into friendly relations in 751 ME (30 March 1389 – 29 March 1390), culminating in a marriage of state between Prince Min Swe and Princess Shin Mi-Nauk. It does not state the reason for the occasion.)	1389/90 (Note: The Yazawin Thit (Yazawin Thit Vol. 1 2012: 200) says the Ava–Maw war that began in 749 ME ended in 751 ME (30 March 1389 – 29 March 1390), culminating in a marriage of state between Prince Min Swe and Princess Shin Mi-Nauk.)	1389/90 (Note: (Hmannan Vol. 1 2003: 424) simply stays with Maha Yazawin's narrative that Ava and Maw entered into friendly relations in 751 ME (30 March 1389 – 29 March 1390) through a marriage of state between Prince Min Swe and Princess Shin Mi-Nauk.)	
Third invasion	1392–1393 (Note: The Razadarit (Pan Hla 2005: 197) says the invasion began in 754 ME (29 March 1392 – 29 March 1393), two years later than the 752 ME date given in the main chronicles. It does not explicitly state when the war ended. Its narrative (Pan Hla 2005: 202–203) continues that after the peace treaty was signed, Ava troops remained lurking in Tharrawaddy, and only retreated before Kason, presumably Kason 755 ME (11 April 1393 – 10 May 1393).)	1390–1391 (Note: (Maha Yazawin Vol. 1 2006: 300) says the invasion began in 752 ME (30 March 1390 – 29 March 1391). (Maha Yazawin Vol. 1 2006: 302): the peace treaty was signed before 753 ME began (30 March 1391), and Ava troops returned to Tharrawaddy after the new year had turned.)	1390–1391 (Note: (Yazawin Thit Vol. 1 2012: 201) says the invasion began in 752 ME (30 March 1390 – 29 March 1391). (Yazawin Thit Vol. 1 2012: 204) the peace treaty was signed before 753 ME began (30 March 1391), and Ava troops returned to Tharrawaddy after the new year had turned.)	1390–1391 (Note: (Hmannan Vol. 1 2003: 429) says the invasion began in 752 ME (30 March 1390 – 29 March 1391). (Hmannan Vol. 1 2003: 432): the peace treaty was signed before 753 ME began (30 March 1391), and Ava troops returned to Tharrawaddy after the new year had turned.)	1391 (Note: (Harvey 1925: 85): Ended in 1391.); 1390/91

== See also ==
- Orders of battle for the Ava–Hanthawaddy War (1385–1391)
- Forty Years' War

== Bibliography ==
- Aung-Thwin, Michael A.; Maitrii Aung-Thwin (2012). A History of Myanmar Since Ancient Times (illustrated ed.). Honolulu: University of Hawai'i Press. ISBN 978-1-86189-901-9.
- Aung-Thwin, Michael A. (2017). Myanmar in the Fifteenth Century. Honolulu: University of Hawai'i Press. doi:10.21313/hawaii/9780824867836.001.0001. ISBN 978-0-8248-6783-6.
- Aye Chan (2006). "Burma: Shan Domination in the Ava Period (c. AD 1310–1555)" (PDF). Journal of the Siam Society. 94.
- Fernquest, Jon (Spring 2006). "Rajadhirat's Mask of Command: Military Leadership in Burma (c. 1384–1421)" (PDF). SOAS Bulletin of Burma Research. 4 (1): 3–29. Archived from the original (PDF) on 19 February 2009.
- Harvey, G. E. (1925). History of Burma: From the Earliest Times to 10 March 1824. London: Frank Cass & Co. Ltd.
- Htin Aung, Maung (1967). A History of Burma. New York and London: Cambridge University Press.
- Kala, U (2006) [1724]. Maha Yazawin (in Burmese). Vol. 1–3 (4th printing ed.). Yangon: Ya-Pyei Publishing.
- Lieberman, Victor B. (2003). Strange Parallels: Southeast Asia in Global Context, c. 800–1830, volume 1, Integration on the Mainland. Cambridge University Press. ISBN 978-0-521-80496-7.
- Maha Sithu (2012) [1798]. Myint Swe; Kyaw Win; Thein Hlaing (eds.). Yazawin Thit (in Burmese). Vol. 1–3 (2nd printing ed.). Yangon: Ya-Pyei Publishing.
- Pan Hla, Nai (2005) [1968]. Razadarit Ayedawbon (in Burmese) (8th printing ed.). Yangon: Armanthit Sarpay.
- Phayre, Lt. Gen. Sir Arthur P. (1967) [1883]. History of Burma. London: Susil Gupta.
- Royal Historical Commission of Burma (2003) [1832]. Hmannan Yazawin (in Burmese). Vol. 1–3. Yangon: Ministry of Information, Myanmar.
- Sein Lwin Lay, Kahtika U (2006) [1968]. Min Taya Shwe Hti and Bayinnaung: Ketumadi Taungoo Yazawin (in Burmese) (2nd printing ed.). Yangon: Yan Aung Sarpay.
- Than Tun (December 1959). "History of Burma: A.D. 1300–1400". Journal of Burma Research Society. XLII (II).
