= Saw E Binnya =

Governor of Tari
- Reign: by 1363–1387
- Predecessor: ?
- Successor: Than Byat (as interim governor)
- Born: c. 1340s Myaungmya Province, Martaban Kingdom
- Died: 1390; Daybathwe, Myaungmya Province, Hanthawaddy kingdom
- Spouse: Tala Thazin Saw Ngaik
- Father: Laukpya
- Mother: Mwei Daw

Saw E Binnya (Burmese: စောအဲဗညား, Burmese pronunciation: [sɔ́ ʔɛ́ bəɲá]; c. 1340s–1390) was governor of Tari from c. early 1360s to 1387. Over his long tenure, he actively participated in two separate rebellions by his father Viceroy Laukpya of Myaungmya and his uncle Viceroy Byattaba of Martaban against their Martaban–Hanthawaddy overlords. It was during the second rebellion that he lost Tari in 1387, and was later assassinated by the Hanthawaddy commander Dein Mani-Yut in 1390.

== Early life ==
Saw E Binnya was born to a large powerful noble family in the Mon-speaking Martaban–Hanthawaddy Kingdom. He was the third child of Mwei Daw and Gov. Laukpya of Myaungmya, a half-cousin, once-removed of King Binnya U (r. 1348–1384). (Note: Laukpya's father [E Binnya's paternal grandfather] Saw E Pyathat was a son of Smin E Kan-Kaung, a half-brother of King Saw Zein (r. 1323–1330). King Binnya U was the only son of King Saw Zein and Queen Sanda Min Hla.) E Binnya had four full siblings (two older full brothers (Ma Nyaung and Sit Lan) and two younger full brothers (Smin Maga and Smin Sanay)), and 63 (or 65) half siblings. (Note: The Razadarit Ayedawbon says Laukpya had a total of 70 children (22 daughters and 48 sons) by 16 child-bearing wives but its detailed listing of the children yields only 68 children (16 daughters and 52 sons).)

Circa early 1360s, (Note: The chronicle Razadarit Ayedawbon does not state exactly when E Binnya was appointed governor. It says E Binnya of Tari later participated in Byattaba's rebellion, which took place in U's 15th year of reign (i.e. 1363/64).) he left his native Myaungmya to become governor of Tari (Burmese: တရည်း, Mon: ကြေဝ်), a small district of just south of Donwun in the Martaban Province (modern Mon State and southern Kayin State). (Note: Per the Razadarit Ayedawbon chronicle, Tari was one of the 32 districts of the eastern (Martaban) province, and located near Donwun towards Martaban (i.e. south of Donwun).) The appointment was made by the then reigning king Binnya U himself. The king had also wedded E Binnya to his half-niece Tala Thazain Saw Ngaik. E Binnya and Saw Ngaik were first cousins as she was a daughter of E Binnya's paternal elder uncle Byattaba and Princess Tala Mi Hsan. Through her mother, she was a granddaughter of King Saw Zein (r. 1323–1330) and Queen May Hnin Htapi of Martaban.

== Career ==
For the next twenty plus years, E Binnya would serve as a vassal ruler of Tari. However, his loyalties lay not with the king but with his uncle and his father. He would actively participate in his father's and uncle's two major rebellions against kings Binnya U and Razadarit.

=== First rebellion ===
E Binnya was part of the rebellion that drove King Binnya U out of Martaban. In 1364, Byattaba seized control of the royal capital Martaban (Mottama) while the king and his retinue were away on a sojourn, searching for a white elephant. From the outset, E Binnya served as a senior commander in Byattaba's rebel force, and successfully defended Tari, which over the next six years became the frontline region between the king's forces based out of Donwun and Byattaba's forces. The rebellion ended favorably for the rebels in 1371 when King Binnya U agreed to recognize Byattaba and Laukpya as the autonomous viceroys of Martaban and Myaungmya provinces, respectively; in return, the brothers agreed to nominally recognize U as their sovereign, who was now based out of Hanthawaddy Pegu (Bago).

For the next dozen years, E Binnya's Tari became the de facto northern border of Byattaba's realm. To his north lay Donwun, which was governed by Smin Sam Lek, a Binnya U loyalist.

=== Second rebellion ===
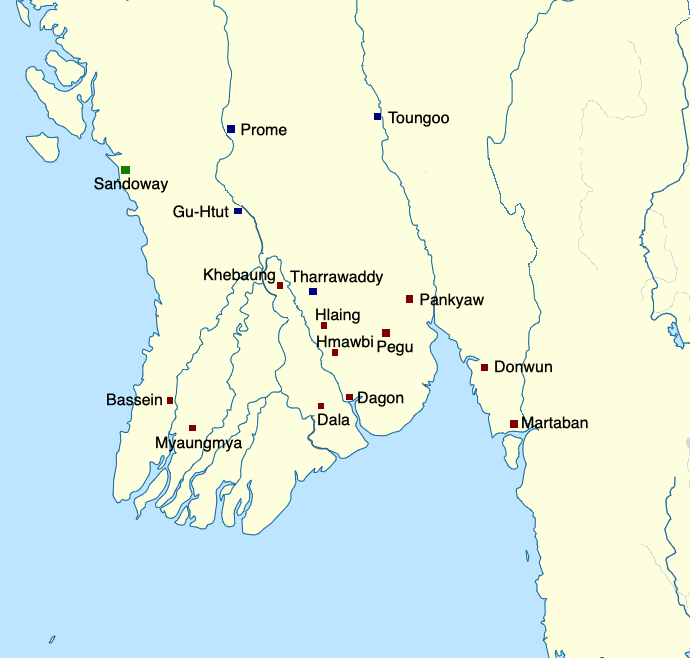
E Binnya's fief, Tari, was south of Donwun. His fort at Daybathwe was near Myaungmya, guarding the invasion route from Dala.

E Binnya again joined his uncle and his father when they raised another rebellion in 1384. The rebellion this time was against Binnya U's successor, Razadarit. His father Laukpya went on to invite the northern kingdom of Ava to invade their southern kingdom, and put him on the Hanthawaddy throne in 1385. This touched off the Ava–Hanthawaddy War (1385–1391). Although his overlord Byattaba was not officially part of the war, E Binnya decided to help his father, and went over to Myaungmya, by 1387. He left Baw Lagun, son of his paternal uncle E Bya-Bon, in charge of Tari.

It turned out that E Binnya would never get back to Tari. In late 1387, Razadarit's forces invaded the northern Martaban province. In their drive to encircle Donwun, the royal army attacked and occupied Tari. Razadarit appointed Than Byat as the interim military governor, and posted a garrison of 500 troops. Although Byattba repeatedly tried to retake Tari in the following months, the attacks all ended in failure. After all of Martaban fell to Razadarit's forces in late 1388 (or early 1389), Razadarit appointed one of his ministers to be governor of Tari, and the previous interim governor Than Byat to be governor of Donwun with the title of Byat Za.

By then, E Binnya had already resettled in his father's province. He had been put in charge of Daybathwe, a key fort near Myaungmya.

=== Death ===
It was outside Daybathwe that E Binnya was assassinated in early 1390. He had fallen for a ruse by a senior Hanthawaddy commander, Dein Mani-Yut, who had offered to defect. The commander had sent a messenger to E Binnya that he and his troops would like to defect because they were tired of disastrous defeats.

E Binnya found Dein's defection story credible. After all, the Hanthawaddy army had indeed just come off a disastrous defeat at the battle of Bassein (Pathein), and had retreated back to their base at Dala (Twante). Dein's regiment was the only Hanthawaddy rearguard force remaining in the Myaungmya province. But E Binnya did not know that Razadarit had regrouped his forces at Dala and was ready to reinvade again, and that the defection story was a ploy.

At any rate, he agreed to Dein's request to personally take Dein in, outside the gates of Daybathwe. On the agreed upon day, E Binnya waited by the gates on his war elephant, accompanied by 20 guards. When he saw that Dein also on his war elephant was approaching with 100 guards, E Binnya asked Dein to come forward alone. After Dein ordered his men to stay behind, E Binnya allowed Dein's elephant to get near his elephant. It was a mistake. When their elephants were side-by-side, Dein then suddenly jumped over to E Binnya's elephant, and killed him. While the Myaungmya troops were in a state of confusion, Hanthawaddy troops suddenly charged forward, blocked the doors of the gate from closing, and captured the fort. It opened the way to Myaungmya for the Royal Hanthawaddy Army which went on take the provincial capital soon after.

== Bibliography ==
- Aung-Thwin, Michael A. (2017). Myanmar in the Fifteenth Century. Honolulu: University of Hawai'i Press. ISBN 978-0-8248-6783-6.
- Fernquest, Jon (Spring 2006). "Rajadhirat's Mask of Command: Military Leadership in Burma (c. 1384–1421)" (PDF). SBBR. 4 (1). Archived from the original (PDF) on 19 February 2009.
- Harvey, G. E. (1925). History of Burma: From the Earliest Times to 10 March 1824. London: Frank Cass & Co. Ltd.
- Maha Sithu (2012) [1798]. Myint Swe; Kyaw Win; Thein Hlaing (eds.). Yazawin Thit (in Burmese). Vol. 1–3 (2nd printing ed.). Yangon: Ya-Pyei Publishing.
- Pan Hla, Nai (2005) [1968]. Razadarit Ayedawbon (in Burmese) (8th printing ed.). Yangon: Armanthit Sarpay.

Saw E Binnya Martaban Dynasty Born: c. 1340s Died: 1390
Royal titles
Preceded by ?	by 1363 – 1387	Succeeded by Than Byat as Interim Governor
