= Lagun Ein =

Maha Saw Lagun Ein
- မဟာစော လဂွန်းအိန်
- Born: Ma Than-Lon c. 1360s Atut
- Died: c. March 1413 near Prome (Pyay)
- Spouse: May Hnin Kaythaya
- Military career
- Allegiance: Royal Hanthawaddy Armed Forces
- Service years: c. 1387–1413
- Rank: General, Admiral
- Conflicts: Ava–Hanthawaddy War (1385–1391); Ava–Hanthawaddy War (1401–1403); Ava–Hanthawaddy War (1408–1418) (to 1413)

Maha Saw Lagun Ein or Lagone Ain, also spelled L’gon Ain (Lə-GON-ay-n ; Mon: လ္ဂန်အိန်, Burmese: မဟာစော လဂွန်းအိန်, Burmese pronunciation: [məhà sɔ́ ləɡʊ́ɴ ʔèiɴ]; d. c. March 1413), personal name Samlom (Mon: သာံလုံံ, Burmese: မသံလုံ), as a key frontline commander of the Hanthawaddy military from the 1380s to 1413. The commander led the military's vanguard land and naval forces as well as notable assassination missions against the enemies of his lord King Razadarit. He is best remembered in Burmese history for his battles against the northern Ava Kingdom in the Forty Years' War as well as his bravery and honesty.

Lagun Ein was mortally wounded and captured by the Ava navy in the first battle after he was promoted to the rank of general. He had gained the deep respect of the Ava high command, which sent his body on a raft down the Irrawaddy River with full military honors.

== Military career ==
=== Coming to prominence ===
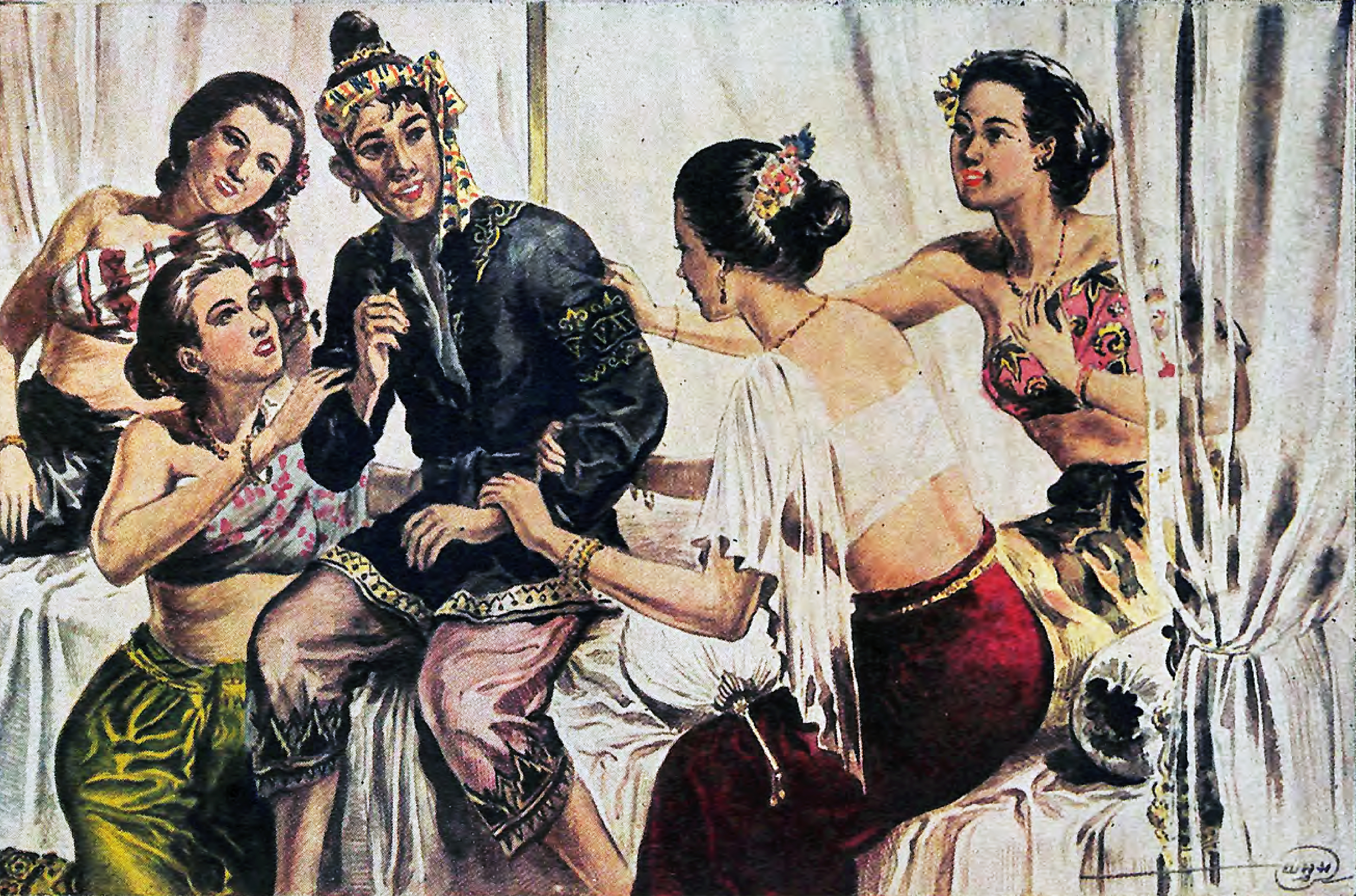
Ma Than Lon got his surprise promotion to be "Smin Lagun Ein" from King Razadarit. An illustration from Rachathirat, a Thai version of Razadarit Ayedawbon, 1946 printed edition.

Chronicles provide no information about his early life except that his personal name was Ma-than-Lon (မသံလုံံ, Burmese pronunciation: [maʔ θàɴ lòʊ̯ɴ]). (Note: (Pan Hla 2005: 258, footnote 1): His personal name is sometimes reported as Ma Thon-Lon (မသုံလုံ, [maʔ θòʊ̯ɴ lòʊ̯ɴ]). Both versions are ethnic Mon names. Per (Pan Hla 2005: 6, footnote 1 and 8, footnote 1), "Ma" is an honorific for males that means "male or lineage", and roughly equivalent to Burmese "Nga" or "Maung".) His first mention in the Razadarit Ayedawbon chronicle comes as an officer in the Hanthawaddy military under the command of Minister-General Thamein Than-Byat (Note: Per (Pan Hla 2005: 171–172). According to San Lwin's reading of a copy of the Razadarit Ayedawbon—as reported in (Fernquest Spring 2006: 8) citing (San Lwin 65–66)'s unpublished manuscript in English (translated from Burmese)—Than-Lon was a warrior who came over to Razadarit's side after Pegu's victory over Lagun-Byi in the campaign against Martaban. But Pan Hla's 1968 version of the chronicle (Pan Hla 2005: 171–173) clearly states that Than-Lon was already a commander in Razadarit's army by the time Lagun-Byi was won.) in 1387–1388. (Note: The Razadarit Ayedawbon (Pan Hla 2005: 178) says that Razadarit conquered Martaban in 750 ME (29 March 1388 to 28 March 1389) but does not state exactly when the campaign began. But since it also says that Razadarit attacked Dala–Twante in the same year (750 ME), it is likely that the Dala campaign took place in the dry season of 1388–1389, and that the Martaban campaign took place a year earlier, in the dry season of 1387–1388, with Razadarit taking Martaban in early 750 ME (c. April/May 1388).) According to the Burmese encyclopedia Myanma Swezon Kyan, he was from a place called Atut, in the Than-Lan township.

At any rate, Than-Lon took part in King Razadarit campaign against the Martaban province (present-day Mon State and southeastern Bago Region.) Than-Lon first made his name in the second battle of Tari (Note: Per (Pan Hla 2005: 171–172), Tari was one of the 32 districts of the eastern (Martaban) province, and located near Donwun towards Martaban (i.e. south of Donwun). (Fernquest Spring 2006) is inconsistent: (Fernquest Spring 2006: 4) says Tari is near Lagun-Pyi and Martaban but its map on (Fernquest Spring 2006: 23) shows Lagun Pyi in the southeastern region of the present-day Bago Region, not near Martaban.) when he successfully led the defense of the town against the forces of Martaban. Impressed, the king ordered him to lead a mission to assassinate Ma Gyaing, governor of nearby Thanmaung town. Than-Lon returned with Ma Gyaing's head.

Razadarit went on to conquer the entire Martaban province in 1388. After a brutal campaign that left the conquered region starving and ravaged, the victorious king handed out lavish awards and fiefdoms to his key officers. He appointed Than-Byat governor of Donwun with the title of Thamein Byat Za. The king also appointed Than-Lon governor of Taikkala, with the title of Lagun Ein ("He Who Is Powerful Like Sakra"). The king also gave him May Hnin Kaythaya, daughter of the rebellious viceroy Sam Lek of Donwun.

=== List of military campaigns ===
From then on, Lagun Ein became a key commander in the Hanthawaddy military. He was recognized for his bravery and entrusted to command the vanguard forces of the army as well as the navy. By his death, he had gained the deep respect of the Ava military.

Campaign	Duration	Troops commanded (Note: Chronicle reported troop levels reduced by an order of magnitude per (Harvey 1925: 333–336))	Notes
Martaban	1387–1388	unknown	Not yet a commander; an officer in Than-Byat's regiment
Irrawaddy delta	1389–1390	20 war boats	Defeated a much larger Bassein's flotilla in the naval battle of Pan-Hlaing.
Ava	1390–1391	1 regiment (1000 troops)	Part of the defense of Fort Pankyaw against Ava forces under the command of Razadarit
Naval siege of Ava	1401–1402	1 flotilla	Led a flotilla of war boats under the command of Admiral Byat Za. Part of the naval siege of Ava in 1401–1402.
Battle of Thaymathauk (Thawutti)	c. December 1402	1 regiment	Led a regiment; reprimanded by his superior Byat Za for what Byat Za considered rash decision-making
Ava (Pegu theater)	1408	500 men or 5000 (early campaign); 500 troops (late)	Led a vanguard force of 500 soldiers and 5 elephants. Participated in the initial peace negotiations but revealed Hanthawaddy's true intention. Led two missions to assassinate Minkhaung I. Led a regiment (500 troops, 10 elephants) that chased Ava troops away.
Ava	1409–1410	500	Led a regiment of 500 troops, 15 elephants
Ava	1410–1411	unmentioned	Chronicles mention only the generals (Byat Za and Dein) that defended the delta. None of the regiment-level officers received any mentions. It is likely that Lagun Ein took part in the defense.
Ava	1412–1413	1 flotilla	Promoted to general after Byat Za's death in 1413. Led a flotilla of war boats (300 troops). Severely wounded in the ensuing battle and captured and died shortly after.

== Notable events ==
The Razadarit Ayedawbon chronicle paints him as a brave and frank warrior whose straight-talk got him into trouble more than once with his superiors. The chronicle reports several episodes involving Lagun Ein.

=== Thuddhamaya episode ===
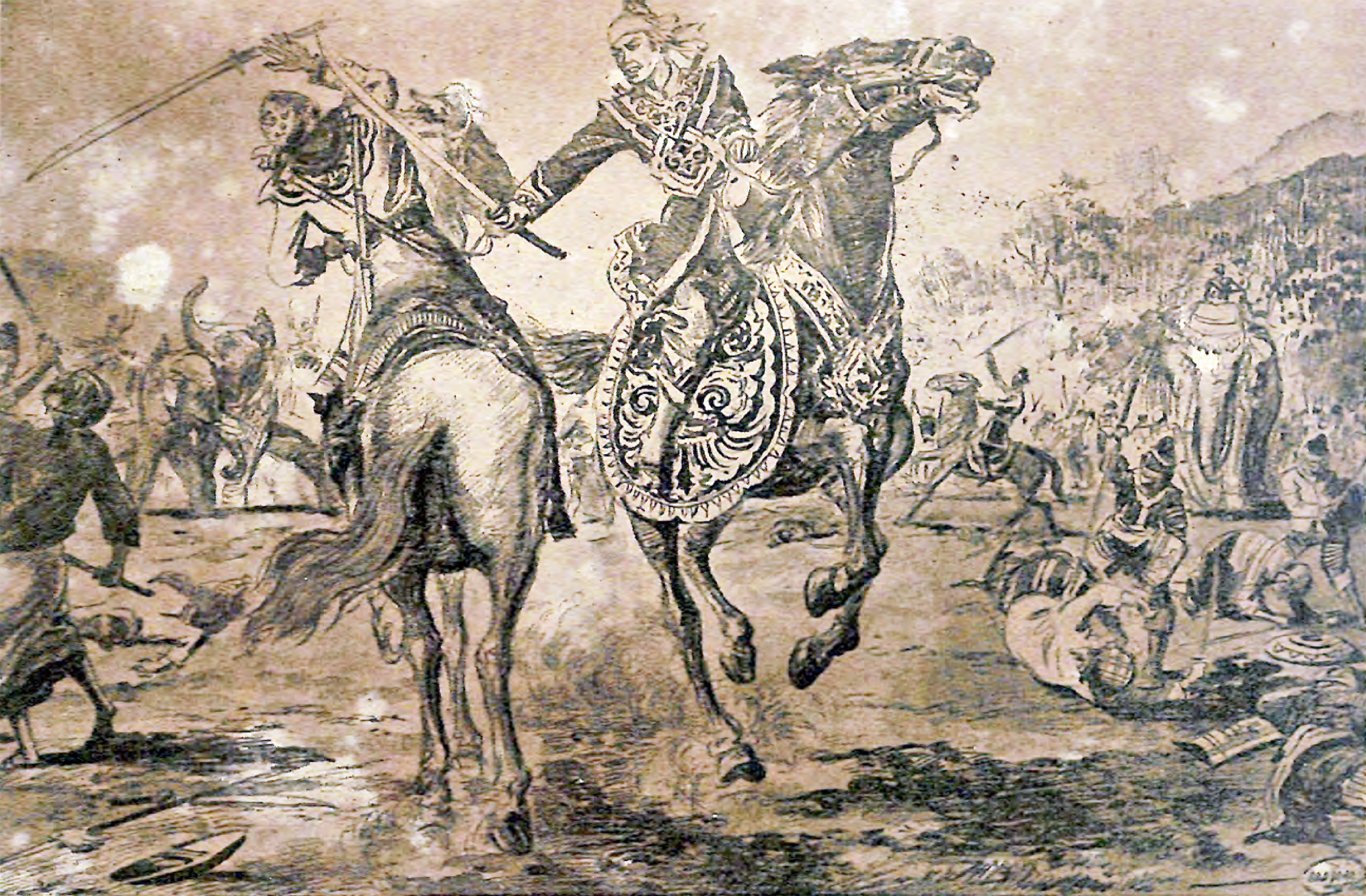
Lagun Ein killed a Burmese general.

The first episode took place in 1389–90, during the delta campaign. For months, Razadarit's forces could not overcome the well fortified cities of Myaungmya and Bassein (Pathein). The Hanthawaddy command then devised a plan to lure the Bassein navy out of their entrenched position to an area downstream at Pan-Hlaing. There, the Hanthawaddy navy had planted stakes across the river from one side to another with enough space that only small war boats of Hanthawaddy could pass through. The plan was to attack the larger Bassein boats as they rammed into the stakes. The task of luring the Bassein navy fell to Lagun Ein. The king himself selected Lagun Ein to lead the mission.

On the day of the mission, Lagun Ein failed to report for duty. When his generals—Byat Za and Dein–went over to his quarters, he bluntly told them that he had not been able to focus on anything since he inadvertently saw Queen Thuddhamaya's bosoms the day before. Even after his superiors sternly reminded him that lusting after the king's queens was high treason, he was unmoved. When his superiors reluctantly reported the predicament to the king, Razadarit ultimately decided that he needed Lagun Ein more than his queen. The king reportedly pronounced that he did "not value the queen but value him [Lagun Ein]". Over Thuddhamaya's objections, he ordered the queen sent in a golden royal litter to Lagun Ein's quarters. By then, Lagun Ein apparently had regained his senses, and sent the queen back to the king. He went on to lead the mission, successfully luring the Bassein navy to Pan-Hlaing where it was ambushed by Hanthawaddy forces.

=== Byat Za's displeasure ===
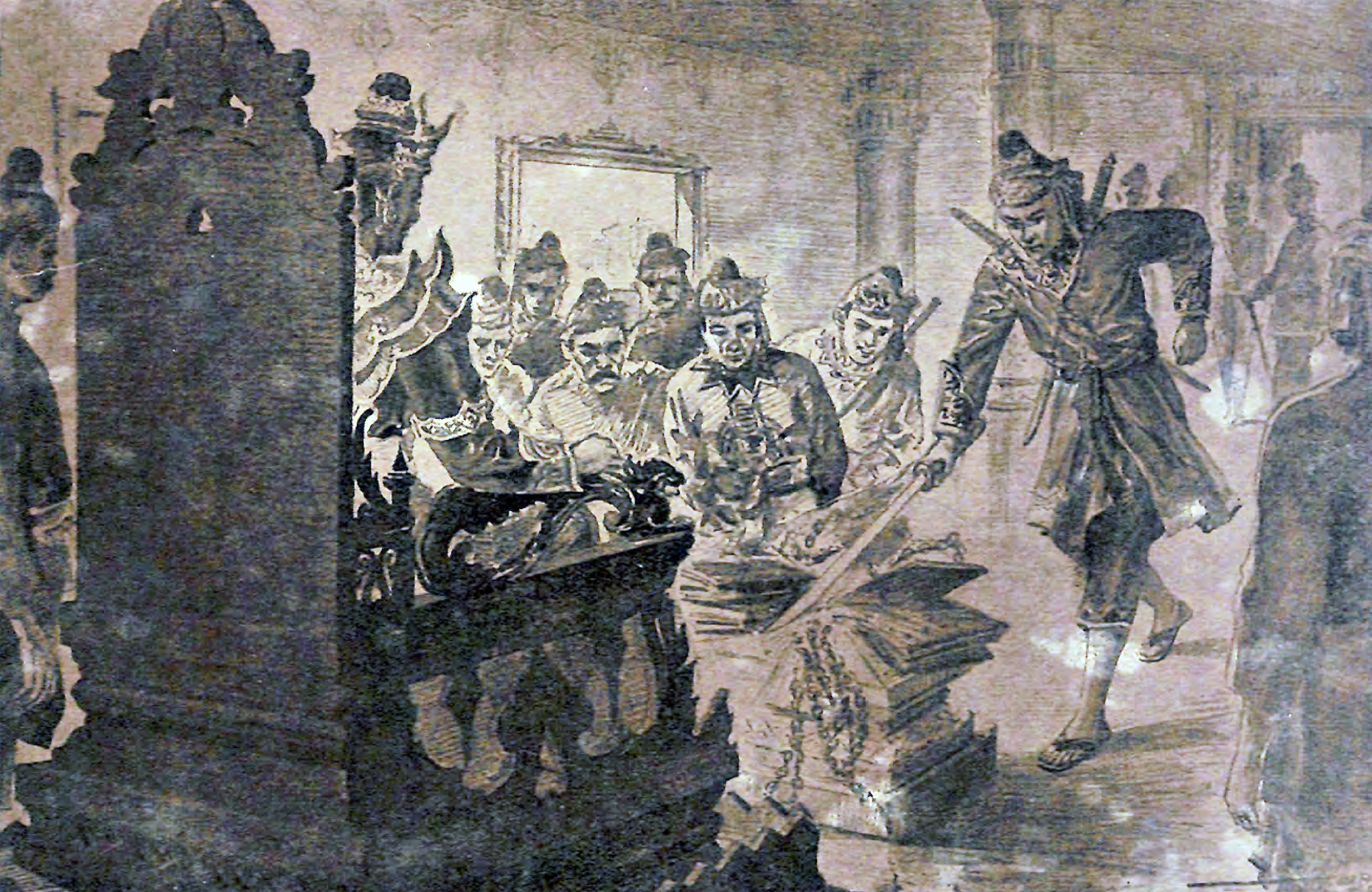
An illustration from Rachathirat, 1946 printed edition by an unknown Thai artist. After the battle of Myaungmya, Ma Pyit-Nwe, a son of Laukpya the viceroy of Bassein–Myaungmya, who will be executed gave his sword to King Razadarit. According to Rachathirat, a Thai version of Razadarit Ayedawbon, The king had ordered Lagun Ein to test his newly royal sword in front of him.

Throughout Lagun Ein's career, Gen. Byat Za was his commanding officer, and shielded the straight-talking Lagun Ein. The Razadarit Ayedawbon chronicle reports one incident in which Byat Za was displeased with Lagun Ein's performance. It was late 1402 when Pegu's war with Ava had resumed. By then, Razadarit's invasion of Ava that began a year earlier had faltered, and Ava was on the offensive. Razadarit sent Byat Za with an army to meet the enemy, and Byat Za in turn assigned Lagun Ein to lead the vanguard regiment. The two armies met near the Thaymathauk (or Thawutti) village, and Lagun Ein's vanguard force engaged the enemy. But because other columns did not follow, his regiment was thoroughly defeated and disbanded, with survivors fleeing to the woods to hide. The remaining Hanthawaddy regiments led by Byat Za did not lose nerve, and met the Ava army the next day. It was the Ava forces that overstretched this time. Lagun Ein and his remaining forces came out of the forest to encircle the Ava army, and the Hanthawaddy army won the battle.

After the battle, Lagun Ein got back to the camp first, and reported the news of the victory to the king. But Byat Za was extremely displeased with the performance of his vanguard units, and felt that Lagun Ein in particular should review the parts that went wrong, and not bask in glory. But Lagun Ein strongly defended by stating that he engaged the enemy exactly as the battle plan called for, and that it was other vanguard units that did not follow his lead. He continued that he did not flee the scene, and that his reconstituted troops were instrumental in encircling of the enemy the next day. The king largely stayed neutral, just issuing a mild reprimand to Lagun Ein for his non-courtly "country-style" blunt speech. An ailing Byat Za was satisfied, and did not hold a grudge against his longtime officer.

=== Incurring Razadarit's wrath ===
==== Revealing Razadarit's plan ====
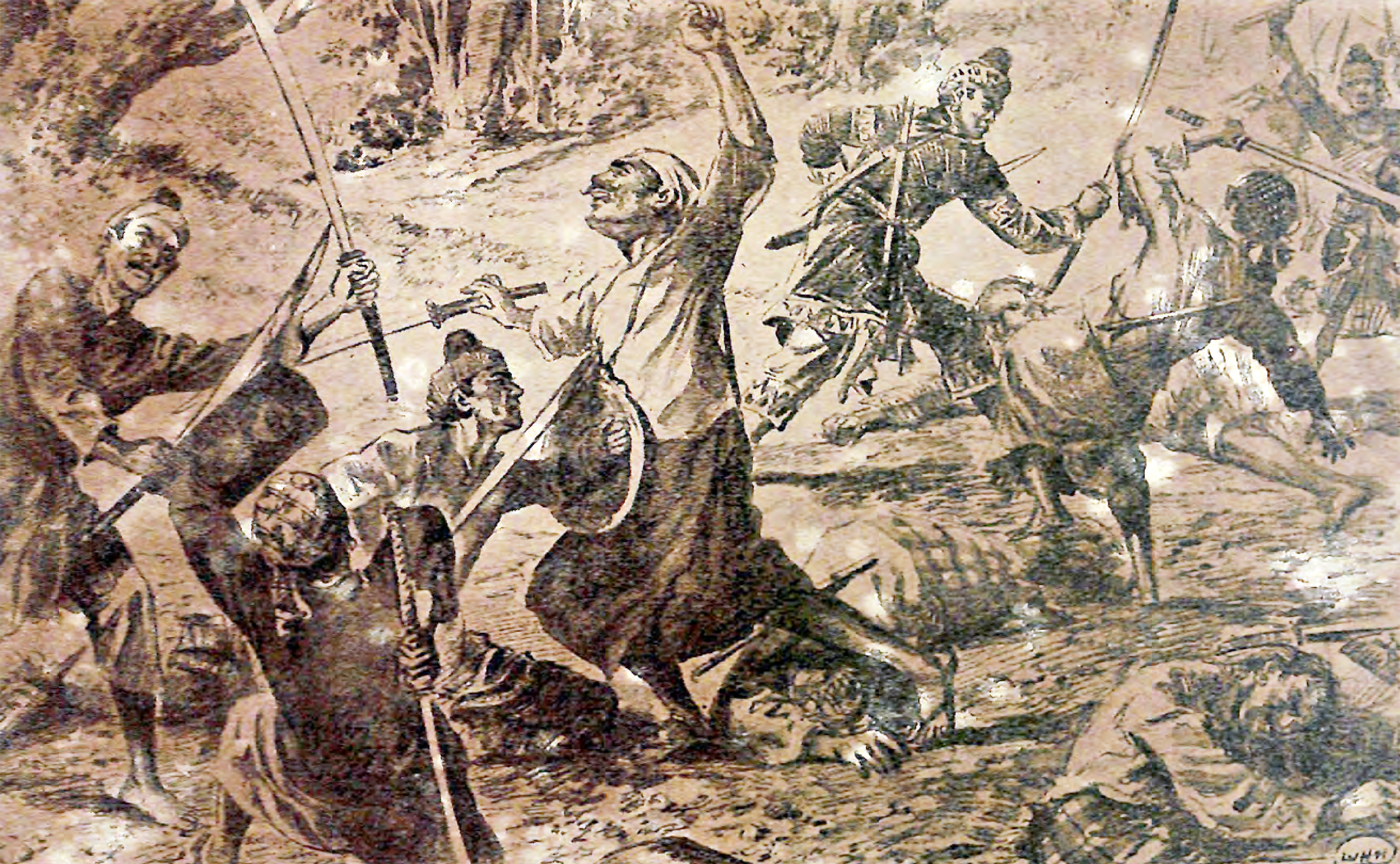
Lagun Ein and Smin Bayan fought Burmese troops together with their double swords.

Lagun Ein's honesty almost got him executed in 1408. That year, Ava forces invaded the southern country, and got bogged down amidst the monsoon season. When King Minkhaung asked for a truce, Razadarit planned to assassinate him at the negotiating table. Lagun Ein was the lowest ranking member of the 30-member Hanthawaddy delegation led by Byat Za to negotiate the ceasefire terms with their Ava counterparts, and to set up a meeting between the two kings. During the negotiations, the Ava commander Thado routinely asked Lagun Ein if Pegu was negotiating in good faith. Lagun Ein answered with brutal honesty: "Fool, this is war. You'll kill me if you can. I'll kill you if I can. How can you trust anyone?"

Spooked, Thado reported the answer to the leader of Ava delegation, Gov. Thray Sithu of Myinsaing, who subsequently broke off the negotiations. Back at Pegu, Razadarit asked why the negotiations had failed. Byat Za tried to cover up but Lagun Ein said it was because he revealed the plan to Thado. The king was furious, and ordered Commander Emundaya to cut off Lagun Ein’s limbs and execute him. Chief Ministers Byat Za and Dein managed to delay the execution until the king's anger subsided.

Byat Za came to see Lagun Ein in prison, and asked why he revealed the plan. Lagun Ein answered that he wanted to win justly, not through manipulation and misrepresentation, and that he was never comfortable with the plan, and could not bear to lie. The minister-general replied that the only way for Lagun Ein to escape the execution was for him to assassinate Minkhaung. Lagun Ein reluctantly accepted the offer. Byat Za still needed to convince the king, who grudgingly agreed.

==== Assassination missions ====
Before the assassination mission, the king upgraded Lagun Ein's title to Maha Saw Lagun Ein, and his wife's title to Tala May Kyaw. Lagun Ein was to lead a team that would ambush Minkhaung along the route near the Ava camp that the Ava king was known to frequent. Razadarit also sent along Minkhaung's younger brother Theiddat, who had defected to Pegu, to identify Minkhaung. However, when they met the Ava king and his retinue, Theiddat shouted out loud to warn his elder brother. The assassination attempt failed. Razadarit ordered the execution of Theiddat.

Lagun Ein was not yet off the hook. The king assigned him to lead another attempt on Minkhaung. Lagun Ein led a team of 12 commandos to infiltrate the Ava camp. The team made it inside the camp from the lightly guarded north side. He and five men managed to get inside the Ava king's quarters. But the plan was foiled when a concubine of Minkhaung saw them and screamed. She was killed but the king escaped. Lagun Ein and his men took Minkhaung's ruby-studded royal sword and gold-plated betel nut chest. They barely escaped. When they got back, Saw Pyei Chantha, Minkhaung's daughter who had been captured in early 1408 and put in Razadarit's harem, identified that the sword and the chest were her father's. Although the second attempt did not succeed, Razadarit forgave Lagun Ein, and let him live.

=== Last campaign ===
Lagun Ein's last campaign came in 1413. At the time, the Hanthawaddy forces had been laying siege to Prome (Pyay) since 1412. Ava forces led by Crown Prince Minye Kyawswa had been trying to break the siege by attacking the Hanthawaddy army from the outside. The Pegu command planned to send in reinforcements to fight off Minye Kyawswa. As usual, Byat Za was to lead the counterattack but the old general was severely ill. Both Razadarit and Lagun Ein went to see Byat Za. When Lagun Ein met Byat Za, he realized the situation, and both men broke down and wept. Byat Za died three days later.

The task of leading the counterattack now fell on Lagun Ein. The king upgraded him to the rank of general. Lagun Ein, in his full general's attire, (Note: (Pan Hla 2005: 285): Golden belt, golden sash, golden arm-guards, Rama-style earrings, stone-studded rings on both hands and bracelets.) boarded the crocodile-shaped war boat. He led the vanguard fleet, and Razadarit followed him with the main flotilla. Near Prome, they were met by the Ava navy led by Sokkate. Lagun Ein's boats initially fought off more numerous Ava boats, expecting Razadarit's boats to relieve them. But the help never came. The Hanthawaddy general personally fought off several attacks on his boat but was eventually taken down after a spear hit one of his legs. Prince Minye Kyawswa ordered his troops not to kill the general.

Minkhaung and Minye Kyawswa brought the Ava army's best physician to treat Lagun Ein. But it was too late. Lagun Ein died shortly after. Minye Kyawswa ordered the general's body sent on a raft down the Irrawaddy with full military honors. Razadarit was greatly shaken by the deaths of Lagun Ein and Byat Za, and ordered an immediate withdrawal from Prome.

== Bibliography ==
- Fernquest, Jon (Spring 2006). "Rajadhirat's Mask of Command: Military Leadership in Burma (c. 1348–1421)" (PDF). SBBR. 4 (1). Archived from the original (PDF) on 2019-08-01.
- Harvey, G. E. (1925). History of Burma: From the Earliest Times to 10 March 1824. London: Frank Cass & Co. Ltd.
- Myanma Swezon Kyan (in Burmese). Vol. 11 (1 ed.). Yangon: Sarpay Beikman. 1970. pp. 476–478.
- Pan Hla, Nai (2005) [1968]. Razadarit Ayedawbon (in Burmese) (8th printing ed.). Yangon: Armanthit Sarpay.
- Royal Historical Commission of Burma (2003) [1832]. Hmannan Yazawin (in Burmese). Vol. 1–3. Yangon: Ministry of Information, Myanmar.
