= Smin Ye-Thin-Yan =

Hanthawaddy military commander (died 1414)

Smin: Ye-Thin-Yan; သမိန် ရဲသင်ရံ
- သၟိင် ရတ္တသံင်ရံာ
- Born: c. 1340s Martaban Kingdom
- Died: October 1414; Tazaungmon 776 ME; Khebaung, Hanthawaddy kingdom
- Military career
- Allegiance: Royal Hanthawaddy Armed Forces
- Service years: c. 1370s–1414
- Rank: General
- Conflicts: Ava–Hanthawaddy War (1385–1391); Ava–Hanthawaddy War (1401–1403); Ava–Hanthawaddy War (1408–1418) (to 1414) †

Smin Ye-Thin-Yan (Mon: သၟိင် ရတ္တသံင်ရံာ; Burmese: သမိန် ရဲသင်ရံ, Burmese pronunciation: [θəmèiɴ jɛ́ θìɰ̃ jàɰ̃]; also transliterated as Re Thinran; c. 1340s–1414) was a Hanthawaddy court minister and military commander during the reigns of kings Binnya U and Razadarit of Hanthawaddy. The minister-general held several key defensive commands during the Forty Years' War against the northern kingdom of Ava until he fell in action in 1414. King Razadarit called Ye-Thin-Yan the best defensive commander to have ever served in his service.

== Early life and career ==
Little is known about Ye-Thin-Yan's early life except that he was a childhood friend and comrade of Viceroy Sam Lek of Donwun, who was appointed to the post in 1371. The first mention of Ye-Thin-Yan in the Razadarit Ayedawbon chronicle is in 1383 when he was already one of the four senior ministers (alongside Smin Maru, Smin Zeik-Bye and Smin Yawgarat) at the court of King Binnya U in Pegu (Bago).

He initially belonged to the court faction led by the king's sister Princess Maha Dewi, the de facto power behind the throne. When the king's eldest son Prince Binnya Nwe raised a rebellion, Ye-Thin-Yan dutifully served as a deputy commander in Maru's expedition force sent to put it down. However, after their regiment was driven back by Nwe's small contingent in November 1383, he and Yawgarat switched their allegiance to the Zeik-Bye faction that secretly supported Nwe. Their pro-Nwe faction successfully put the prince on the throne after King Binnya U died in January 1384.

== In Razadarit's service ==
=== Early reign ===
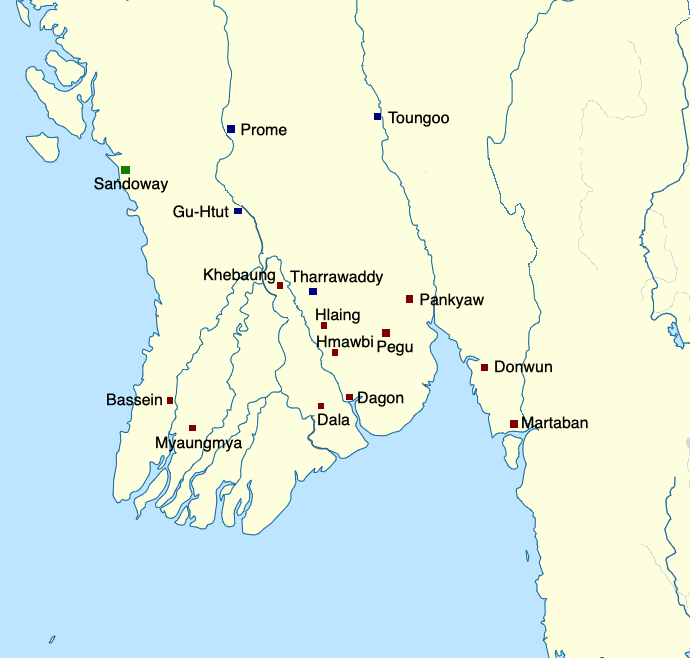
Ye-Thin-Yan made his name in the battles of Hlaing (1386–1387) and Donwun (1387–1388)

Ye-Thin-Yan proved to be a lifelong loyalist of the new king, now known by his regnal title, Razadarit. He steadfastly supported the king in the decades-long war against the northern kingdom of Ava. He first made his name during Ava's 1386–1387 invasion when he served as the deputy commander of the 500-strong regiment led by Dein Mani-Yut that successfully defended Hlaing (Taikkyi) against much larger Ava forces.

He was also instrumental in the capture of Donwun by the Hanthawaddy army in the following dry season. According to the Razadarit Ayedawbon chronicle, when the Hanthawaddy army could not take the heavily fortified city for months, Razadarit sent Ye-Thin-Yan on a mission to get the city's gates opened. The scheme called for Ye-Thin-Yan to deceive his childhood friend and thwethauk (Note: (Harvey 1925: 178): thwethauk was a "blood-bond, a sacramental brotherhood of some round table as it were.") comrade Sam Lek, the viceroy of Donwun. As the story goes, Ye-Thin-Yan and 300 men showed up at the gates of Donwun, pretending to have defected. Ye-Thin-Yan also presented a sack of gold and silver, which he claimed to have taken from the royal treasury. Sam Lek was initially skeptical but he was finally persuaded by his thwethauk comrade, and let the defectors in. Once inside, the men bided their time until the predetermined date and time when Razadarit's forces attacked from the outside. They then attacked from the inside, and opened the gates. The city finally fell, and Sam Lek was killed.

=== Later years ===
At the turn of the 15th century, Ye-Thin-Yan continued to be part of Razadarit's inner circle, serving primarily as an adviser. His military career essentially winded down after 1401–1402 when he commanded a naval flotilla that invaded Ava in 1401–1402. The old minister did not go to the front again afterwards for the next dozen years. The only commands he held were defensive in nature. He was twice entrusted to guard the capital Pegu while Razadarit left for the front with the main army during the 1408 and 1409–1410 campaigns. Ye-Thin-Yan did not see any action in either case.

=== Last battle ===
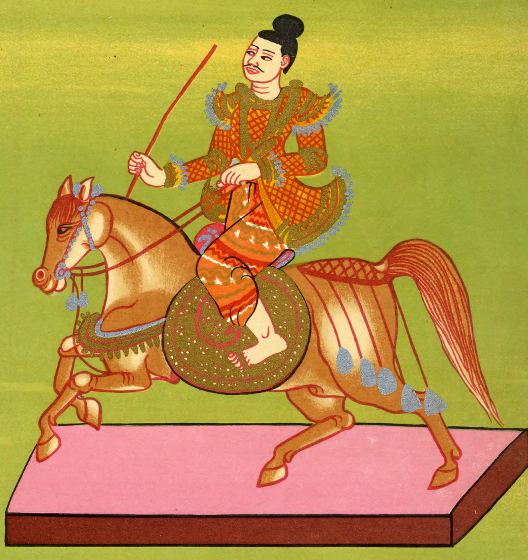
Representation of Crown Prince Minye Kyawswa, whose forces Ye-Thin-Yan fought in 1414

The old general was to return to active duty in 1414, however. By then, the tide of war had decidedly turned to Ava's favor under the leadership of Crown Prince Minye Kyawswa, and two senior Hanthawaddy commanders Byat Za and Lagun Ein had fallen. Ye-Thin-Yan was assigned to defend Khebaung, Hanthawaddy's main frontline fort that guarded the invasion route to the Irrawaddy delta. (Note: (Yazawin Thit Vol. 1 2012: 247): Ava's battle plan was to conquer Khebaung; take Bassein (Pathein) and Myaungmya in the delta; move east and conquer Dala-Twante and Dagon; and finally take Pegu (Bago).)

The battle began in October 1414. Minye Kyawswa sent an 8000-strong army (8 regiments, 600 cavalry, 40 war elephants), and a naval flotilla carrying 13,000 troops. Ava forces attacked for five consecutive days but could not break through. Meanwhile, Ye-Thin-Yan motivated his troops by "handing out awards, and making displays with swords and shield at every portal to the stirring sound of war drums." When Ava forces resumed their attack a few days later, those that got past the fort's moat were cut down while trying to scale the walls. The attack was called off after three hours. (Note: (Yazawin Thit Vol. 1 2012: 248): The battle lasted about 1 baho (3 hours).)

The reprieve was short-lived. Ava forces again returned a few days later, with Minye Kyawswa himself leading the attack. The crown prince had declared that anyone who failed to charge would be executed. The crown prince and his elite 800 troops then led the charge. After half an hour of fierce fighting, (Note: (Yazawin Thit Vol. 1 2012: 248) and (Hmannan Vol. 2 2003: 23): Ava troops got past the moat, and reached near the wall. They were able to burn down a portion of the wall. In all, it took one nayi (24 minutes) to breach the defenses.) Ava forces finally breached the fort's walls. The fighting continued inside, and Ye-Thin-Yan died in action.

When informed about the fall of Khebaung and the old general's death, a shaken Razadarit remarked that Ye-Thin-Yan was the best defensive commander ever in his service while Byat Za and Lagun Ein were the best ever offensive commanders.

== Military service ==
The following is a list of military campaigns in which Ye-Thin-Yan is explicitly mentioned in the chronicles as a commander.

Campaign	Duration	Troops commanded (Note: Chronicle reported troop levels reduced by an order of magnitude per (Harvey 1925: 333–336))	Notes
Binnya Nwe's rebellion	1383	1000 troops	Smin Ye-Thin-Yan and Smin Yawgarat served under Smin Maru in the 1000-strong vanguard regiment.
Ava's second invasion	1386–1387	500 troops	Commanded 500 troops in the battle of Hlaing (Taikkyi) under the command of Dein Mani-Yut
Martaban	1387–1388	300 troops 1000 troops	Commanded 300 troops in the battle of Donwun; Commanded a regiment (1000 troops) in the 5000-strong vanguard division that was defeated in the battle of Martaban
Ava	1390–1391	1000 troops	Commanded one of the eight regiments (8000 troops) that defended Fort Pankyaw.
Naval siege of Ava	1401–1402	1 flotilla	Commanded one rearguard flotilla alongside other rearguard flotillas commanded by Dein and Smin Byat-hat-baik.
Pegu	1408	?	Commanded the force that guarded the capital Pegu while the king left for the front
Pegu	1409–1410	?	Commanded the force that guarded the capital Pegu while the king left for the front
Battle of Khebaung	1414	?	Killed in action

== Bibliography ==
- Fernquest, Jon (Spring 2006). "Rajadhirat's Mask of Command: Military Leadership in Burma (c. 1384–1421)" (PDF). SBBR. 4 (1). Archived from the original (PDF) on 19 February 2009.
- Harvey, G. E. (1925). History of Burma: From the Earliest Times to 10 March 1824. London: Frank Cass & Co. Ltd.
- Kala, U (2006) [1724]. Maha Yazawin (in Burmese). Vol. 1–3 (4th printing ed.). Yangon: Ya-Pyei Publishing.
- Maha Sithu (2012) [1798]. Myint Swe; Kyaw Win; Thein Hlaing (eds.). Yazawin Thit (in Burmese). Vol. 1–3 (2nd printing ed.). Yangon: Ya-Pyei Publishing.
- Pan Hla, Nai (2005) [1968]. Razadarit Ayedawbon (in Burmese) (8th printing ed.). Yangon: Armanthit Sarpay.
- Royal Historical Commission of Burma (2003) [1832]. Hmannan Yazawin (in Burmese). Vol. 1–3. Yangon: Ministry of Information, Myanmar.
- Shorto, H.L. (2002). "The 32 Myos in the medieval Mon Kingdom". In Vladimir I. Braginsky (ed.). Classical civilisations of South East Asia: an anthology of articles. Routledge. ISBN 9780700714100.
