= Sam Lek of Donwun =

Smin Sam Lek
- သမိန်သံလိုက်

Viceroy of Donwun
- In office by 1371–1388
- Monarch: Binnya U
- Preceded by: Nai Swe Ban (as governor)
- Succeeded by: Byat Za (as governor)

Governor of Taikkala
- In office 1370/71 – by 1371
- Monarch: Binnya U

Personal details
- Born: Me Sam (Ma Than) c. 1340s Martaban Kingdom
- Died: 1388 South of Donwun; Hanthawaddy kingdom
- Children: May Hnin Kaythaya

Military service
- Allegiance: Hanthawaddy kingdom
- Branch/service: Royal Hanthawaddy Armed Forces
- Years of service: 1360s–1384
- Commands: Army
- Battles/wars: Battle of Donwun (1370/71); Battle of Donwun (1388)

Smin Sam Lek (Note: Transliteration per (Shorto 2002: 578)) (Mon: သ္ငီသံလှေက်, Burmese: သမိန်သံလိုက်, Burmese pronunciation: [θəmèiɴ θàɴ laiʔ]; also spelled Thamein Than Laik; c.1340s – 1388) was viceroy of Donwun for the Hanthawaddy kingdom from 1370/71 to 1388. Sam Lek was appointed to the office by King Binnya U of Hanthawaddy after he had recaptured Donwun, the ancestral home of the dynasty, for the king.

Sam Lek proved a key loyal vassal until U's death in 1384. He refused to submit to U's eldest son and successor Razadarit, who had raised a rebellion against U in 1383–1384. Sam Lek remained defiant until he died in action in 1388.

== Early life and career ==
=== Background ===
Sam Lek was born Me Sam (Mon: မသာံ, Burmese: မသံ) (Note: This is a Mon name. မသံ is typically transliterated as Ma Than using modern Burmese pronunciation.) to an aristocratic family in the Martaban Kingdom. He may have been a prince, (Note: (Shorto 2002: 578) calls him a prince but the Razadarit Ayedawbon (Pan Hla 2005) does not mention Sam Lek being of royal background.) and had at least one elder brother, Gov. Smin Zeik-Bye of Dala. (Note: (Pan Hla 2005: 60–61): This Smin Zeik-Bye was not the minister Zeik-Bye who served at the Pegu court from the 1370s until 1415. Sam Lek's brother Smin Zeik-Bye of Dala died in 1370.) By 1370, he was a senior officer in the army of King Binnya U.

=== Military service ===
In 1370, the king, who had been fighting a two-front war against rebellions led by Byattaba of Martaban (modern southern Mon State), and Laukpya of Myaungmya (modern Ayeyarwady Region) since 1364, appointed him governor-general of Taikkala (about 10 km south of modern Kyaikto), with the title of Smin Sam Lek. Upon the appointment, Sam Lek took command of the king's southernmost garrison at Zoklari (near modern Taungzun village, west of Bilin), about 10 km south of Taikkala, and about 20 km northwest of Donwun, the northernmost rebel-held town.

His assignment was to recover Donwun. Winning back Donwun had a great symbolic significance to Binnya U. The small town was not only the ancestral home of the dynasty but also served as U's wartime capital from 1364 to 1369 when the king was driven out by Byattaba's forces. The king was particularly angry at how the rebel forces broke the social norm of the day. About 700 rebel troops entered the town disguised as mourners of Chief Minister Pun-So, who had just died. They had shaven their heads in the tradition of Mon people, and the town's guards let them in. The rebel forces then attacked the palace, and the king barely escaped.

Sam Lek's opportunity came soon after his appointment. In late 1370 or early 1371, a son of Byattaba, the rebel leader, died in Martaban. Upon hearing that Donwun was also observing the mourning period, Sam Lek decided to try the same tactic. He and 300 men in their shaven heads marched to Donwun, and waited outside the town's main gate. The next morning, the town's guardsmen let them in. Sam Lek's men seized the governor's residence, killed the governor Nai Swe Ban, and took the town.

The king was overjoyed. He gave Donwun to Sam Lek as a fiefdom, and awarded him the royal regalia befitting a viceroy. (Note: The title of the office as described in the chronicle Razadarit Ayedawbon (Pan Hla 2005: 61) was min (မင်း), which in its generic form means lord but can be translated as king, viceroy or prince, depending on the situation.)

== Viceroy of Donwun ==
=== Loyal vassal of Binnya U ===
Sam Lek proved an able and loyal vassal. In the following years, he kept the northern Martaban province in Binnya U's realm, while Byattaba continued to rule the southern province. His job was made easier by the truce reached between the king and the two rebel brothers—Byattaba and Laukpya—soon after the battle of Donwun. The rebel brothers agreed to acknowledge U as their overlord in exchange for U's recognition of their de facto independent rule.

Sam Lek proved a rare loyal vassal even when U gradually withdrew from governing the kingdom due to deteriorating health in later years. When U's eldest son Binnya Nwe revolted in 1383, Sam Lek remained firmly in the ailing king's camp. He refused to submit when Nwe, 16, ascended the throne with the title of Razadarit in 1384.

=== Rebellion against Razadarit ===
Sam Lek's insurrection was one of the three main rebellions against Razadarit; the other two were by Byattaba and Laukpya. But the viceroys did not form a united front against the new king. Razadarit, who controlled only the Pegu province (modern Yangon Region and southern Bago Region), could not take any action, as he was trying to survive invasions by the northern Ava Kingdom in 1385–1387.

For his part, Sam Lek did not consider himself a rebel. To him, Razadarit, who was not the chosen heir of Binnya U, was the true rebel and not a rightful successor. Even when Razadarit, facing an imminent invasion, in desperation asked Sam Lek to send troops in 1385, Sam Lek could not bear to send help. On the other hand, unlike Laukpya who invited Ava to invade the country, Sam Lek never aided Ava, nor did he join forces with Laukpya or Byattaba.

== Fall from power and death ==
Ultimately, Sam Lek's policy of neutrality left him isolated. When Ava did not invade in the dry season of 1387–1388, the first place Razadarit and the Pegu court looked to deploy their already mobilized forces was the northern Martaban province. Razadarit sent an ultimatum to Sam Lek to submit. Unfazed, Sam Lek replied that he was not a rebel, and that he would submit if Razadarit's forces could overcome other rebels en route to Donwun.

To be sure, he had no intention to submit. When Razadarit's armies conquered the northern province and showed up before Donwun's walls, Sam Lek, confident that his heavily fortified town could withstand the attacks, simply reneged on the pledge. His confidence was not unfounded. Pegu forces could not take the heavily fortified Donwun despite taking heavy casualties.

However, Donwun would soon fall to a ruse. Razadarit sent Commander Smin Ye-Thin-Yan, a childhood friend and thwethauk (Note: (Harvey 1925: 178): thwethauk was a "blood-bond, a sacramental brotherhood of some round table as it were.") comrade of Sam Lek, pretending to have defected with 300 men. Sam Lek was initially distrustful. Ye-Thin-Yan convinced him that he had stolen loads of gold and silver from the king, and that his men would enter Donwun without any arms. Sam Lek, who had tried a similar deception in 1370 or 1371, let the men in. At a predetermined time, Razadarit's forces from outside the town and Ye-Thin-Yan's men from the inside launched a coordinated attack. The gates were opened, and Sam Lek tried to flee to Martaban on a war elephant. The elephant went into musth, allowing Razadarit's forces to catch up with him. Commander Saw Bya Let, atop his own war elephant, killed the viceroy, who died on his elephant.

== Aftermath ==
According to the Razadarit Ayedawbon chronicle, Razadarit was saddened by the death of Sam Lek because he wanted an experienced commander like Sam Lek in his service. The king had actually issued a do-not-kill order during the chase, but the order did not make it to the vanguard forces in time. Nevertheless, Razadarit took Sam Lek's daughter May Hnin Kaythaya, who was already married, as a concubine before giving her to Commander Lagun Ein.

== Bibliography ==
- Fernquest, Jon (Spring 2006). "Rajadhirat's Mask of Command: Military Leadership in Burma (c. 1348–1421)" (PDF). SBBR. 4 (1). Archived from the original (PDF) on 2019-08-01.
- Harvey, G. E. (1925). History of Burma: From the Earliest Times to 10 March 1824. London: Frank Cass & Co. Ltd.
- Maha Sithu (2012) [1798]. Myint Swe; Kyaw Win; Thein Hlaing (eds.). Yazawin Thit (in Burmese). Vol. 1–3 (2nd printing ed.). Yangon: Ya-Pyei Publishing.
- Pan Hla, Nai (2005) [1968]. Razadarit Ayedawbon (in Burmese) (8th printing ed.). Yangon: Armanthit Sarpay.
- Shorto, H.L. (2002). "The 32 Myos in the medieval Mon Kingdom". In Vladimir I. Braginsky (ed.). Classical civilisations of South East Asia: an anthology of articles. Routledge. ISBN 9780700714100.

Sam Lek of Donwun Hanthawaddy Dynasty Born: c. 1340s Died: 1388
Royal titles
Preceded by Nai Swe Ban as governor	Viceroy of Donwun; 1370/71 – 1388	Succeeded by Byat Za as governor
