= Laukpya =

Laukpya လောက်ဖျား

Viceroy of Bassein–Myaungmya
- Reign: by 1364–1390
- Predecessor: unknown
- Successor: Byat Za (as governor)
- Born: c. 1320s (Note: The Razadarit Ayedawbon chronicle's narrative of Laukpya's early life is improbable. The chronicle (Pan Hla 2005: 40) says Laukpya's father Pyatthat was born soon after Saw Zein's accession in September 1323. Then it says on the same page that Pyatthat died in action the war against Prome (Pyay) during Zein's reign, and that Zein treated Pyatthat's four young sons well. But Zein's reign lasted only about 7 years (1323–1330). Pyatthat could not have been born c. 1323/24, and have had four sons by 1330. Given that Pyatthat's eldest son Byattaba was married to Tala Mi Ma-Hsan, who was born during the reign of Saw Zein, Byattaba was probably born in the 1320s. Laukpya too was probably born in the 1320s.)
- Died: 1390/91; 752 ME; Dagon
- Issue: 70 children, including: Bya Kun; Ma Pyit-Nwe; Lauk Shein; Saw E Binnya
- Father: Saw E Pyathat
- Religion: Theravada Buddhism

Laukpya (Burmese: လောက်ဖျား or လောက်ဖြား, Burmese pronunciation: [laʊ̯ʔ pʰjá]) was the ruler of the Bassein province of the Martaban–Hanthawaddy Kingdom from 1364 to 1390. He came to power by helping his brother Byattaba stage a coup against King Binnya U. He was also a key figure who started the Ava–Hanthawaddy War (1385–1391) between the Mon-speaking Hanthawaddy Pegu and the Burmese-speaking Ava.

== Brief ==
Laukpya was appointed governor of Myaungmya, a key port in the Irrawaddy delta by King Binnya U. In 1364, Laukpya's eldest brother Byattaba, then a senior official, seized the Martaban province south of Donwun while Laukpya seized the entire Bassein province. In 1371/72, the rebel brothers and the king signed a treaty that allowed the brothers to be his nominal vassals. In 1384, the brothers refused to extend the same recognition to Binnya U's son and successor Razadarit. In 1385, as Razadarit prepared to march to the delta, Laukpya sought assistance from King Swa Saw Ke of Ava with the promise of submission to Ava.

Laukpya's wrote to Swa:

Glorious king, the ungrateful son, who was rebel when his father was alive, now has dared to ascend the great Binnya U's throne, assuming the title of "Razadarit". Before he can make his position secure, I beg my lord to attack Pegu both by land and by water. Your humble servant holds both Bassein and Myaungmya, and shall attack Pegu by water. When you have achieved your great triumph, take all the treasures for yourself; as to your humble servant, grant him only the annual revenue.

Swa's acceptance of Laukpya's invitation resulted in the Forty Years' War between Ava and Pegu. Swa's inaugural invasions of Hanthawaddy in 1385–86 and 1386–87 could not break Razadarit's defenses. In 1388/89, Razadarit attacked the delta. Razadarit's army could not take Myaungmya, which was heavily fortified, and was defeated at Bassein which was defended by Laukpya's two sons. Then his son Ma Pyit-Nwe, despite Laukpya's objections, ventured out to fight Razadarit's forces but was defeated by Razadarit's forces. Myaungmya surrendered in 1390. The entire delta followed. Laukpya's son Bya Kun and son-in-law Bya Kyin both fled to Ava. Swa welcomed the princes, and made Bya Kun governor of Salin and Bya Kyin, governor of Prome (Pyay).

Laukpya had 16 wives and 70 children.

== Bibliography ==
- Harvey, G. E. (1925). History of Burma: From the Earliest Times to 10 March 1824. London: Frank Cass & Co. Ltd.
- Htin Aung, Maung (1967). A History of Burma. New York and London: Cambridge University Press.
- Kala, U (2006) [1724]. Maha Yazawin (in Burmese). Vol. 1–3 (4th printing ed.). Yangon: Ya-Pyei Publishing.
- Maha Sithu (2012) [1798]. Myint Swe; Kyaw Win; Thein Hlaing (eds.). Yazawin Thit (in Burmese). Vol. 1–3 (2nd printing ed.). Yangon: Ya-Pyei Publishing.
- Pan Hla, Nai (2005) [1968]. Razadarit Ayedawbon (in Burmese) (8th printing ed.). Yangon: Armanthit Sarpay.
- Phayre, Lt. Gen. Sir Arthur P. (1967) [1883]. History of Burma. London: Susil Gupta.

Laukpya Hanthawaddy Dynasty Born: 1320s Died: 1390/91
Royal titles
Preceded by	Lord of Myaungmya early 1360s – 1390	Succeeded by Byat Za as governor
