= Taikkala =

Taikkala တိုက်ကုလား
- Location in Myanmar
- Coordinates: 17°15′N 97°4′E
- Country: Myanmar
- State: Mon State
- District: Thaton District
- Time zone: UTC+6:30 (MST)

Taikkala (Burmese: တိုက်ကုလား, [taiʔ kəlá]) is an ancient historical site, located in Mon State, Myanmar.

== Bibliography ==
- Moore, Elizabeth H.; San Win (2014). "Sampanago: "City of Serpents" and Muttama (Martaban)" (PDF). SOAS: 216–237.
