= Byattaba =

Byattaba ဗြတ်ထဗ

Ruler of Martaban
- Reign: 1364–1388
- Predecessor: Binnya U (as king)
- Successor: Byat-Ka-Man (as governor)
- Monarch: Binnya U (c. 1371–1384)
- Born: c. 1324; Martaban (Mottama)
- Spouse: Tala Mi Ma-Hsan
- Issue Detail: 4 sons and 3 daughters
- Father: Saw E Pyathat
- Religion: Theravada Buddhism

Byattaba (Burmese: ဗြတ်ထဗ; Burmese pronunciation: [bjaʔ tʰə ba̰]; also Byat-Hta-Ba) was the ruler of the Martaban province of the Martaban–Hanthawaddy Kingdom from 1364 to 1388. He came to power by staging a coup against King Binnya U with the help of his brothers. Their rebellion led to the relocation of the Mon-speaking kingdom's capital to Pegu (Bago) in 1369.

In 1364, Byattaba, then a senior official, seized the Martaban province south of Donwun while his brother Laukpya seized the entire Bassein province. In 1371/72, the rebel brothers and the king signed a treaty that allowed the brothers to be his nominal vassals. In 1384, the brothers refused to extend the same recognition to Binnya U's son and successor Razadarit. Unlike Laukpya, Byattaba did not help Ava in the northern kingdom's two invasions against Pegu in 1385–1387. Nonetheless, he was driven out of Martaban in 1388 by Razadarit. He fled abroad, never to be heard from again.

== Early life ==
According to the chronicle Razadarit Ayedawbon, Byattaba was the eldest son of Saw E Pyathat, a general in the Martaban army. His personal name was Nyi San (ညီစန်, [ɲì sàɴ]), and he was probably born in the early-to-mid 1320s. (Note: The Razadarit Ayedawbon chronicle's narrative of Byattaba's early life is improbable. The chronicle (Pan Hla 2005: 40) says Byattaba's father Pyathat was born soon after Saw Zein's accession in September 1323. Then it says on the same page that Pyathat died in action the war against Prome (Pyay) during Zein's reign, and that Zein treated Pyatthat's four young sons well. But Zein's reign lasted only about 7 years (1323–1330). Pyathat could not have been born c. 1323/24, and have had four sons by 1330. Given that Byattaba was married to Tala Mi Ma-Hsan, who was born during the reign of Saw Zein, Byattaba was probably born in the 1320s. Furthermore, since he was the eldest of four sons, and since his father died in the late 1320s, Nyi San must have been born by 1324/25. Indeed, the chronicle narrative about his father being born soon after Saw Zein's accession might refer to Byattaba's birth.) He was a half-cousin, twice removed of kings Saw O (r. 1311–1323) and Saw Zein (r. 1323–1330). (Note: (Pan Hla 2005: 40): Byattaba's father Saw E Pyathat was a son of Smim E Kan-Kaung, a half-brother of King Saw Zein. It means Smim E Kan-Kaung was a son of Gov. Min Bala of Myaungmya, and Byattaba was King Saw Zein's half-cousin, twice removed, and King Binnya U's half-cousin, once removed.) He had three younger brothers: E Bya Bon, Laukpya and U-Lo, and at least one younger half-brother, Ma Lagun.

Their father died in action in the late 1320s against a war with Prome, a vassal state of Pinya. Saw Zein decided to look after Pyathat's children. The king died in 1330 but his promise to take care of Pyathat's children was honored by subsequent monarchs. Nyi San apparently was in sufficiently high social standing that he was given the title Byattaba, and was allowed to marry Princess Tala Mi Ma-Hsan, daughter of Saw Zein and half-sister of Binnya U (r. 1348–1384).

Byattaba's star continued to rise in the early reign of Binnya U. In the first five years of U's reign, U faced two internal rebellions and an external invasion by Lan Na. Byattaba and his brothers were loyal to U, and the king reciprocated. By the early 1360s, he had brought the two elder brothers—Byattaba and E Bya Bon—into his inner circle, and appointed the third brother Laukpya governor of Myaungmya, a key port in the Irrawaddy Delta. The king personally married Byattaba's daughter Tala Thazin Zaw Ngaik, and Laukpya's son Saw E Binnya, and appointed E Binnya governor of Tari, a small town south of Donwun.

== Rebel ruler of Martaban (1364–1371) ==
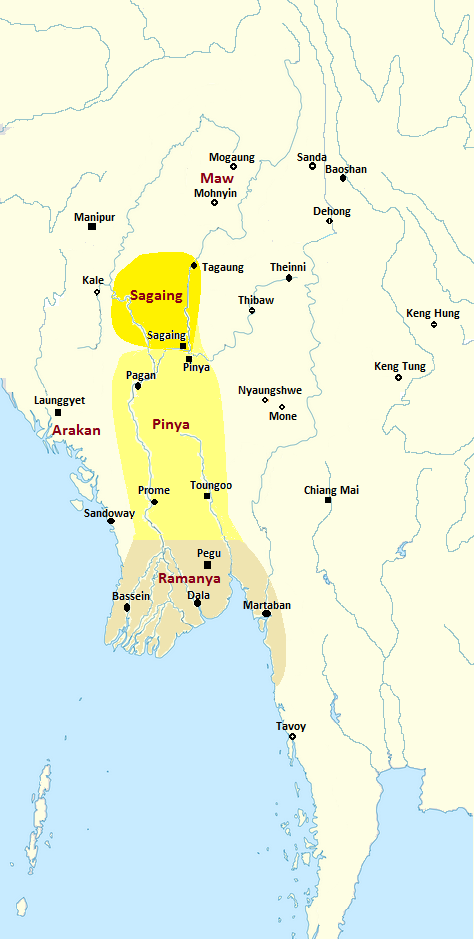
Myanmar c. 1350: Martaban was then capital of Ramanya

=== Silent coup (1363–1364) ===
Despite the king's trust in them, the brothers were contemplating a rebellion. The main instigator was Laukpya, who was posted far away from Martaban, and had quickly developed a network of support across the delta province through a series of alliances. The opening came in 1363. That year, the king asked Byattaba to guard the capital Martaban while the king and his retinue went on a months-long elephant hunting trip near the Siamese border. The king, whose main title was Hsinbyushin ("Lord of the White Elephant"), had been searching for a white elephant, considered highly propitious by Burmese sovereigns, since the death of his first white elephant in 1354/55. The king believed that his victory over the Lan Na invasion of 1351–1352 was due to the luck brought by his white elephant. The king and his sizable retinue, consisted of his key advisers, generals and 2000 troops, went on the planned hunting trip, c. November 1363. The king left the capital in the trusted hands of Byattaba, who in turn was aided by his brothers E Bya Bon and U-Lo.

The brothers then staged a silent coup. Byattaba consolidated power at the palace. E Bya Bon took over the defenses of Lagun Byi, a town north of Martaban while U-Lo took over Moulmein (Mawlamyaing), the town immediately south of Martaban, across the Salween River (Thanlwin). In the delta, Laukpya had fortified Myaungmya. Only their half-brother Lagun, governor of a small eastern delta town of Let-Hlyit remained loyal to the king. The king did not learn about the coup until four months into the trip. He rushed back to the capital. His troops recaptured Lagun Byi from E Bya Bon but twice failed to take Martaban, losing his two best generals in the process. In the western theater, Laukpya tried to seize Dala–Twante but could not get past the defenses of his half-brother Lagun.

=== Stalemate (1364–1369) ===
By the rainy season of 1364, a stalemate had developed. The king had set up camp at Donwun, 100 km north of Martaban. Byattaba had held on Martaban and the southern coast but his hold was tenuous. In Martaban, Byattaba and E Bya Bon had had to institute a lockdown of the city to prevent people from fleeing. (Note: (Pan Hla 2005: 52): To deal with the problem, E Bya Bon made an example out of three people caught fleeing the city by beheading them; and had his men parade their severed heads around the city and declare that all deserters would meet the same fate.) With the king controlling the most populous Pegu province, the brothers realized that they could not hold out for long. They appealed to the king of Lan Na to intervene, promising a cut of the tax revenue of Martaban and Moulmein ports.

At Chiang Mai, King Kue Na was interested. Chiang Mai had wanted to pull Martaban, a former Sukhothai tributary, into its sphere of influence at least since 1351 while Chiang Mai's rival Ayutthaya had claimed all former Sukhothai tributaries since 1350. (Note: (Phayre 1967: 66, footnote 1): King Ramathibodi claimed in 1350 that Tenasserim, Tavoy, Moulmein and Martaban were subject to him. Per Phayre, Tenasserim and Tavoy may have been but not Moulmein and Martaban. (Harvey 1925: 112): The Siamese kingdom of Ayutthaya "certainly held Tenasserim" by 1373 "but it can have received only nominal tribute from Moulmein and Martaban".) When he heard that Chiang Mai might again invade, U repaired ties with Chiang Mai by sending his eldest daughter to Kue Na in a marriage of state. Although Chiang Mai's intervention did not materialize, U did not proceed to retake Martaban or the delta.

An uneasy ceasefire persisted for the next five years. The brothers controlled nearly two out of the three provinces of the kingdom: Byattaba held the Martaban province, south of Donwun (modern Mon State and southern Kayin State) while Laukpya held the delta (modern Ayeyarwady Region). The king controlled only the northern third of the Martaban province to Donwun, and the all-important Pegu province (modern southern Bago Region and Yangon Region).

=== Renewed fighting (1369–1371) ===
The brothers then launched a surprise attack on Donwun in 1369. Their attack was opportunistic, and came a few days after the death of Chief Minister Pun-So, U's righthand man. During the mourning period, E Bya Bon and 700 warriors, disguised as mourners, managed to get inside Donwun, and seized U's palace. The king fled to Pegu (Bago), about 120 km northwest of Donwun, across the Bay of Martaban, and relocated his capital there. (Although the move to Pegu was made under duress, the move proved permanent. By then, Pegu was the more natural location to be the capital due to its strategic location—between the other two provinces—and its "agricultural and demographic potential". The traditional home of the dynasty, Martaban, on the other hand, was located on the upper Tenasserim coast, and too close to the Tai kingdoms to the east.)

The brothers' advantage was fleeting. They tried but neither Byattaba nor Laukpya could make any headway into Pegu throughout 1370–1371. Meanwhile, U secured his rear by successfully negotiating a peace treaty with King Swa Saw Ke of Ava that demarcated the border between the two kingdoms. Soon after the treaty with Ava, U launched a counterattack, which was partially successful. His forces retook Donwun but could not advance farther south. The two sides were now back on their pre-1369 borders.

== Viceroy (c. 1371/72–1384) ==
=== Truce ===
According to the Razadarit Ayedawbon, it was the king that first sued for peace with the rebel brothers. Despite his success in retaking Donwun, he was still concerned about a potential interference by Lan Na. (The marriage alliance between the two states was at a breaking point. His daughter Tala Mi Thiri was never happy at Chiang Mai, and had been asking her father to bring her back for several years.) The brothers too were interested in an agreement that would preserve their status. The two sides then agreed to a treaty that called for U to recognize the brothers as the rightful viceroys of Martaban and Bassein (Irrawaddy delta) provinces, and to pay them 10 viss (16.33 kg) of gold and ten elephants in exchange for the brothers' recognition of U as their sovereign as well as brokering of an agreement with Lan Na to maintain peace. (Note: The Razadarit (Pan Hla 2005: 62–63) says the king wanted the king of Chiang Mai to return his daughter.) As the Razadarit Ayedawbon recounts, U realized the absurdity of the overlord paying tribute to the vassals but he ultimately decided to swallow his pride, and agreed to the terms. On the other hand, Byattaba and Laukpya realized that they needed Lan Na's support in order to neutralize Pegu's stronger position. The brothers sent 15 viss (24.49 kg) of gold in total to retain Chiang Mai's support. The king of Lan Na sent back Tala Mi Thiri to Pegu.

=== Nominal vassal ===
The treaty held until Binnya U's death in 1384. Though officially viceroys, Byattaba and Laukpya ruled their territories like sovereigns. For their part, they did not get involved in the affairs of Pegu even when the king gradually withdrew from governing due to his long illness. When U's 15-year-old son Binnya Nwe raised a rebellion in 1383, neither viceroy interfered. When princess-regent Maha Dewi asked them to contribute troops to put down the rebellion, each sent a regiment to ensure that the fighting would not spill over to their territories. But neither joined the actual fighting.

== Back in rebellion (1384–1388) ==
=== Independent but neutral ===
In January 1384, the Pegu court chose the rebel son Nwe, who took the reign name of Razadarit. Byattaba and Laukpya did not acknowledge the new king, who at his accession had not yet turned 16. It was not just them. Even rulers of the northern Martaban province who were loyal to the late king refused to acknowledge the new boy king. Razadarit for his part considered the entire "32 districts" of the Martaban province in revolt. One silver lining was that not all the rebels were united. For example, Gov. Smim Than-Hlyit of Donwun, who fought against Byattaba in the 1360s, declared that he was not allied anyone.

Byattaba and Laukpya too were not in sync as to how to respond to Razadarit. Laukpya believed that they needed external support to keep Pegu at bay. Laukpya's preferred external power was the northern Ava Kingdom, which by the mid-1380s, had emerged as the main power in the Irrawaddy valley, and was intent on restoring the erstwhile Pagan Empire. Byattaba, whose territory bordered the Tai states to the east, was much more circumspect about an alliance with Ava, and ultimately decided to stay neutral. Unlike Laukpya, he did not attack Pegu during the first two invasions of Pegu by Ava in 1385–1387. The fighting took place almost entirely in the delta.

=== War (1387–1388) ===
Byattaba's decision would come back and haunt him. In 1387, after two failed invasions, Ava had to pause its war in the south as it was pulled into a renewed conflict with the northern Shan state of Maw. Razadarit immediately seized the opportunity, and sent a sizeable army to Martaban in the dry season of 1387–1388. Much of the fighting took place in the northern parts of the province. It took several months before the Pegu army could breach the defenses of Donwun. Than-Hlyit and his 300 troops tried to flee to Martaban but the governor-general was killed en route by the Pegu troops.

The way to Martaban was now open. Unlike before, Laukpya had not opened the western front. But Byattaba did not panic. He still had the support of his other brothers, E Bya Bon and U-Lo, who were commanders in his army, and had collected enough men and arms. When the Martaban command heard that a Pegu army was taking a circuitous route through the woods to encircle the city from the east, the brothers planned a surprise attack outside the city. In the wee hours, the Martaban army, led by the three brothers themselves, ambushed and destroyed the five vanguard regiments of the Pegu army. But the Martaban command did not know that two Pegu rearguard regiments, led by generals Smim Than-Byat and Dein, were still in the area. While the Martaban army dispersed to mop up the remaining enemies in the area, Than-Byat launched a surprise attack targeting the battalions guarding the Martaban command. It worked. Byattaba, E Bya Bon and U-Lo all fled. The remaining Martaban forces surrendered.

== Aftermath ==
Byattaba and his brothers could not get back to Martaban or Moulmein before Razadarit's forces. They fled to a foreign country. At Martaban, a victorious Razadarit had Byattaba's chief wife Princess Tala Mi Ma-Hsan present all the tax payments owed to his father Binnya U in gold, silver, pearls, emeralds, and other precious stones. The king then appointed Byat Ka-Man as governor of Martaban.

== Family ==
Byattaba's chief wife was Princess Tala Mi Ma-Hsan. The couple had one daughter named Tala Thazin Zaw-Ngaik, who was married to her first cousin Saw E Binnya, son of Laukpya. In all, Byattaba had three sons (Ma Taw, Ma Yay, Yazathu) and four daughters.

== Bibliography ==
- Aung-Thwin, Michael A.; Maitrii Aung-Thwin (2012). A History of Myanmar Since Ancient Times (illustrated ed.). Honolulu: University of Hawai'i Press. ISBN 978-1-86189-901-9.
- Fernquest, Jon (Spring 2006). "Rajadhirat's Mask of Command: Military Leadership in Burma (c. 1348–1421)" (PDF). SBBR. 4 (1). Archived from the original (PDF) on 2019-08-01.
- Harvey, G. E. (1925). History of Burma: From the Earliest Times to 10 March 1824. London: Frank Cass & Co. Ltd.
- Htin Aung, Maung (1967). A History of Burma. New York and London: Cambridge University Press.
- Kala, U (2006) [1724]. Maha Yazawin (in Burmese). Vol. 1–3 (4th printing ed.). Yangon: Ya-Pyei Publishing.
- Lieberman, Victor B. (2003). Strange Parallels: Southeast Asia in Global Context, c. 800–1830, volume 1, Integration on the Mainland. Cambridge University Press. ISBN 978-0-521-80496-7.
- Maha Sithu (2012) [1798]. Kyaw Win; Thein Hlaing (eds.). Yazawin Thit (in Burmese). Vol. 1–3 (2nd printing ed.). Yangon: Ya-Pyei Publishing.
- Pan Hla, Nai (2005) [1968]. Razadarit Ayedawbon (in Burmese) (8th printing ed.). Yangon: Armanthit Sarpay.
- Phayre, Lt. Gen. Sir Arthur P. (1967) [1883]. History of Burma. London: Susil Gupta.

Byattaba Hanthawaddy Dynasty Born: c. 1324
Royal titles
Preceded by Binnya U as King	Ruler of Martaban; 1364–1388	Succeeded by Byat Ka-Man as Governor
