= Donwun =

Donwun ဒုန်ဝန်းမြို့
- Location in Burma
- Coordinates: 17°9′N 97°17′E
- Country: Burma
- Division: Mon State
- District: Thaton District
- Time zone: UTC+6:30 (MST)

Donwun (Burmese: ဒုန်ဝန်းမြို့, pronounced [dòʊɰ̃ wʊ́ɰ̃ mjo̰]; also spelled Don Wun; also known as Wun), located 16km north of Thaton, is a former capital of Hanthawaddy. It remained as the capital of Donwun for over five years, between 1364 and 1369.

== List of rulers of Donwun ==
=== Pagan period ===
| Name | Term From | Term Until | Relationship to predecessor(s) | Overlord(s) | Notes |
|---|---|---|---|---|---|
| Wareru | 1281/82 | 1285 (or 1287) | Appointed | Aleimma of Martaban (vassal of Pagan) | In revolt, 1285–1287 |

=== Hanthawaddy period ===
| Name | Term From | Term Until | Relationship to predecessor(s) | Overlord(s) | Notes |
|---|---|---|---|---|---|
| ? | 1285 (or 1287) | early 1307 | | Wareru | May have been Hkun Law (Note: The Razadarit Ayedawbon chronicle says Hkun Law appointed Nye Yan Maw-la-mun governor of Donwun and Sittaung after his coronation ceremony. This may mean that Hkun Law may have been the previous governor of those towns.) |
| Nyi Yan Maw-la-mun | January 1307 | late 1307 | Appointed | Hkun Law | Killed in action during a Lan Na raid |
...
| Smin E-Thi-Bon | ? | late 1330 | Appointed | Saw E; Binnya E Law | Captured by Sukhothai forces, alongside Smin Ngaw of Sittaung |
...
| Saw E-Deit and Baw Kye | 1351/52 | 1351/52 | n/a | Kingdom of Lan Na | Seized Donwun with Lan Na support |
| Smin Pun-Si | 1352? | 1364 (or 1369/70) | Appointed | Binnya U | Also referred to as Smin Pun-So |
Temporary capital of King Binnya U (1364–1369)
| Nai Swe Ban | 1369/70 | 1370/71 | Appointed | Byattaba | Byattaba loyalist, executed |
| Smin Sam Lek | by early 1371 | 1388 | Appointed | Binnya U | In revolt, 1384–1388 |
| Byat Za | 1388 | 1390 | Appointed | Razadarit | |
...
| Smin Bayan | 1423 | c. 1440s? | Appointed | Binnya Ran I | |
...

== Bibliography ==
- Harvey, G. E. (1925). History of Burma: From the Earliest Times to 10 March 1824. London: Frank Cass & Co. Ltd.
- Moore, Elizabeth H.; San Win (2014). "Sampanago: "City of Serpents" and Muttama (Martaban)". Before Siam : essays in art and archaeology (PDF). SOAS. pp. 216–237.
- Pan Hla, Nai (2005) [1968]. Razadarit Ayedawbon (in Burmese) (8th printing ed.). Yangon: Armanthit Sarpay.

Donwun
| Preceded by Mottama | Capital of Hanthawaddy Kingdom c. February 1364 – 1369 | Succeeded by Bago |
