= Ava–Hanthawaddy War =

Ava–Hanthawaddy War can refer to:

- Ava–Hanthawaddy War (1385–1391)
- Ava–Hanthawaddy War (1401–1403)
- Ava–Hanthawaddy War (1408–1418)
- Ava–Hanthawaddy War (1422–1423)
- Ava–Hanthawaddy War (1430–1431)

== See also ==
- Ava–Hanthawaddy War (1408–1410) orders of battle
- Ava–Hanthawaddy War (1410–1412) orders of battle
- Ava–Hanthawaddy War (1412–1414) orders of battle
- Ava–Hanthawaddy War (1416–1418) orders of battle
