= Ava–Hanthawaddy War (1408–1418) =

Military conflict in present-day Myanmar (1408–1418)

- Part of the Forty Years' War
Date	March 1408 – late 1418
Location	Southern Myanmar; Western Myanmar; Northern Myanmar
Result	Hanthawaddy and coalition victory
Territorial changes	Ava loses control of Launggyet Arakan, which becomes a protectorate of Hanthawaddy; Ava retains control of its nearer Shan states (Mohnyin, Bhamo, Onbaung, Yatsauk, Nyaungshwe)

Belligerents
Ava: Launggyet (to 1408; 1408–1409; 1411–1412)	Hanthawaddy Pegu: Launggyet (1408; 1409–1411; from 1412); China and its client states (1412–1415): Hsenwi; Maw (Mong Mao)

Commanders and leaders
Minkhaung I; Minye Kyawswa †; Thihathu; Min Nyo; Letya Pyanchi †; Nawrahta; Thado; Thray Sithu; Baya Gamani; Yazathingyan; Tarabya; Thihapate; Sithu Pauk Hla #; Letya Zeya Thingyan; Sokkate; Tho Kyaung Bwa; Htaw Hmaing; Thettawshay †; Nanda Thuriya †; Nanda Kyawthu; Smin Bayan Upakaung (Note: from 1415); Anawrahta (executed)	Razadarit; Theiddat (executed); Binnya Dhammaraza; Binnya Ran Bassein; Binnya Kyan Dala; Binnya Set (surrendered); Byat Za #; Dein Mani-Yut; Smin Awa Naing; Maha Thamun; Smin Ye-Thin-Yan †; Smin Bayan Upakaung (surrendered) (Note: to 1414); Lagun Ein †; Smin Than-Kye; Smin Paik-Nye; Smin Maw-Khwin (surrendered); Min Saw Mon; Min Khayi; Yongle Emperor; Hkam Hkai Hpa †; Hkam Yawt Hpa; Sawbwa of Mawdon; Sawbwa of Mawke

Strength
Ava–Pegu Theater (Note: Unless otherwise stated, the military mobilization figures in this article are reduced by an order of magnitude from those reported in the royal chronicles, per G.E. Harvey's analysis in his History of Burma (1925) in the section Numerical Note (pp. 333–335).): 1408: 26,000 infantry; 2200 cavalry; 100 elephants; 1409–10: 14,000+; 1400; 100 (Note: [x] infantry; [y] cavalry; [z] elephants); 1410: 14,000; 600; 40; 1412–13: 12,000+; 600+; 40+; 1414–15: 21,000+; 600+; 80+; 1416: 8000; 400; 30; 1417–18: 16,000; 700; 40; Arakan Theater: 1408: 300+; ?; ?; 1411: 10,000+; 1000+; ~100; 1411–12: 8000+; 300+; 30+; 1416: 1 garrison; Shan States Theater: 1412: 7000; 400; 20; 1413–14: 8000; 400; 30; 1414–15: ?	Ava–Pegu Theater: 1408: 8000 infantry; 300 cavalry; 60 elephants; 1409–10: 8000+; 400+; 90+; 1410: 3+ regiments; 2 flotillas; 1412–13: 12,000; 800; 30 (later reduced to 5000; 400; 10); 1414–15: 10,000+; ?; ?; 1416: 7000; 500; 30+; 1417–18: ?; Arakan Theater: 1408: 4000+; ?; 20+; 1411: 5000+; 200; 50; 1411–12: 5000+; 200; 50; 1416: ?; Shan States Theater: 1412: 20,000+; 2000+; ?; 1413–14: ?; 1414–15: 4000; 200; 20

Casualties and losses
Total unknown	Total unknown
- See Ava–Hanthawaddy War (1408–1410) orders of battle, (1410–1412), (1412–1414), (1414–1415), and (1416–1418) for more information.

The Ava–Hanthawaddy War (1408–1418) (Burmese: အင်းဝ–ဟံသာဝတီ စစ် (၁၄၀၈–၁၄၁၈)) was the third major conflict of the Forty Years' War, fought between Ava and Hanthawaddy Pegu, both located in present-day Myanmar. The decade-long war escalated into a multi-front, multi-sided conflict that also involved China and Siam. Hanthawaddy and China successfully checked Ava's expansion drive.

The casus belli stemmed from Ava's expansion under King Minkhaung I, who after the Ava–Hanthawaddy War (1401–1403) annexed the nearer Shan states and Launggyet Arakan (1404–1406). While the Ming court warned Ava to end its "aggression", King Razadarit of Hanthawaddy feared he was next, and seized Arakan in March 1408. A furious Minkhaung hastily invaded the southern kingdom but his forces were decimated during the punishing rainy season. His subsequent 1409–1410 invasion also failed, leading a dejected Minkhaung to cede command to his eldest son, Crown Prince Minye Kyawswa.

Minye Kyawswa brought a new, flexible strategy, focusing on the Irrawaddy delta rather than the difficult Sittaung front. When his inaugural delta invasion stalled in late 1410, he swiftly redirected his forces to Arakan, capturing the region in March 1411. However, he was soon forced to leave the front due to the imminent Chinese threat—the Yongle Emperor had authorized military action against Ava—which allowed Hanthawaddy to retake Arakan by early 1412.

Both kingdoms were soon forced to fight on multiple fronts. In April 1412, the Chinese vassal Hsenwi invaded Ava's northeast, advancing to Wetwin—just 80 kilometers from Ava (Inwa). Minye Kyawswa successfully repulsed the invasion, besieged Hsenwi throughout the rainy season, and defeated a 20,000-strong Chinese relief army in October. In November, Razadarit opened Ava's southern front to relieve pressure on Hsenwi by laying siege to Prome (Pyay). One month into the siege, Siamese forces opportunistically invaded Hanthawaddy's southernmost districts, forcing Razadarit to lead the majority of his forces to drive them out. This allowed Ava forces to launch a counter-invasion, and occupy the delta by May 1413.

However, Ava's momentum was again stalled as China and its vassals continued to attack Ava's northern districts throughout 1413–1415. In 1413, Minkhaung had to recall Minye Kyawswa to chase Maw (Mong Mao) forces to the Chinese border. In his final invasion, Minye Kyawswa recaptured the entire delta in 1414, but could not breach the formidable defensive line of Dala, Dagon and Syriam, en route to Pegu (Bago). Minkhaung refused to send reinforcements as the Chinese threat remained. The war's climax came during a Hanthawaddy counterattack on 13 March 1415 when Minye Kyawswa fell in action outside Dala.

The war lost its intensity afterwards. China stopped its invasions after 1415. A grief-stricken Minkhaung stopped all military action until Razadarit sent a minor probe in 1416. Minkhaung ordered a final retaliatory campaign in 1417–1418, after which he declared the two kingdoms "even." This resulted in an unofficial peace that held until both rival kings died in 1421. Hanthawaddy had succeeded in maintaining its independence, while Ava had lost Arakan but secured its nearer Shan states. The peace broke down in 1422 when Minkhaung's successor, King Thihathu, intervened in a Pegu succession crisis, starting the Ava–Hanthawaddy War (1422–1423).

== Background ==
This was the third war between Ava and Hanthawaddy Pegu. In the first two wars, each kingdom attempted to exploit the other's succession crisis. In the first war (1385–1391), King Swa Saw Ke of Ava unsuccessfully tried to replace the new king of Hanthawaddy, Razadarit. Conversely, Razadarit attempted to gain the submission of Ava's new king Minkhaung I in the second war (1401–1403).

Minkhaung emerged stronger after the second war. Not only was he able to negotiate a favorable peace treaty with Razadarit but he had also finally gained the support of his vassals. Minkhaung immediately began using his newfound power. Ava went on to take over its neighboring Shan states to the east and the north: Onbaung (1404/05), Yatsauk and Nyaungshwe (1405/06), and Bhamo and Mohnyin (1406).

Ava's acquisition spree alarmed its neighbors. In August 1406, the Ming court, which considered the Shan states its tributaries, dispatched an embassy to Ava (Inwa), ordering the kingdom to end its "aggression" in the border states. At Pegu, the concern was far greater. Razadarit had been wary about Ava's potential threat to Pegu since the end of the second war. According to the Razadarit Ayedawbon chronicle, c. October 1406, (Note: According to the Razadarit Ayedawbon, the Pegu court learned about Ava's plans to attack Arakan and Pegu when its border patrols intercepted an Ava envoy en route to Chiang Mai who had inadvertently veered into Hanthawaddy territory. Hanthawaddy spies in Ava shortly after reported that Ava forces had in fact already left for Arakan. Since Ava forces conquered the Arakanese capital of Launggyet on Monday, 5th waning of Nadaw 768 ME (Monday, 29 November 1406) per the Rakhine Razawin Thit chronicle, Ava forces must have left for Arakan around the end of the rainy season, i.e. October/November 1406.) the king received intelligence that his court deemed credible: Ava planned to invade Launggyet Arakan next, followed by Pegu. (Note: To be sure, the main chronicles—the Maha Yazawin, Yazawin Thit and Hmannan Yazawin—which mainly narrate from the Ava side, dispute the Razadarit's account; they say Ava decided to retaliate only after Pegu had invaded Arakan in 1408.)

Pegu's suspicions were seemingly confirmed shortly after. In November 1406, Ava forces led by Minkhaung's eldest son Prince Minye Kyawswa invaded Arakan on the western littoral. In response, Razadarit and his army rushed to Bassein (Pathein) to closely monitor the events across the Arakan border. Although Ava forces never crossed the Arakan–Hanthawaddy border, the Pegu court was convinced that Pegu was indeed next.

== Prelude to war ==
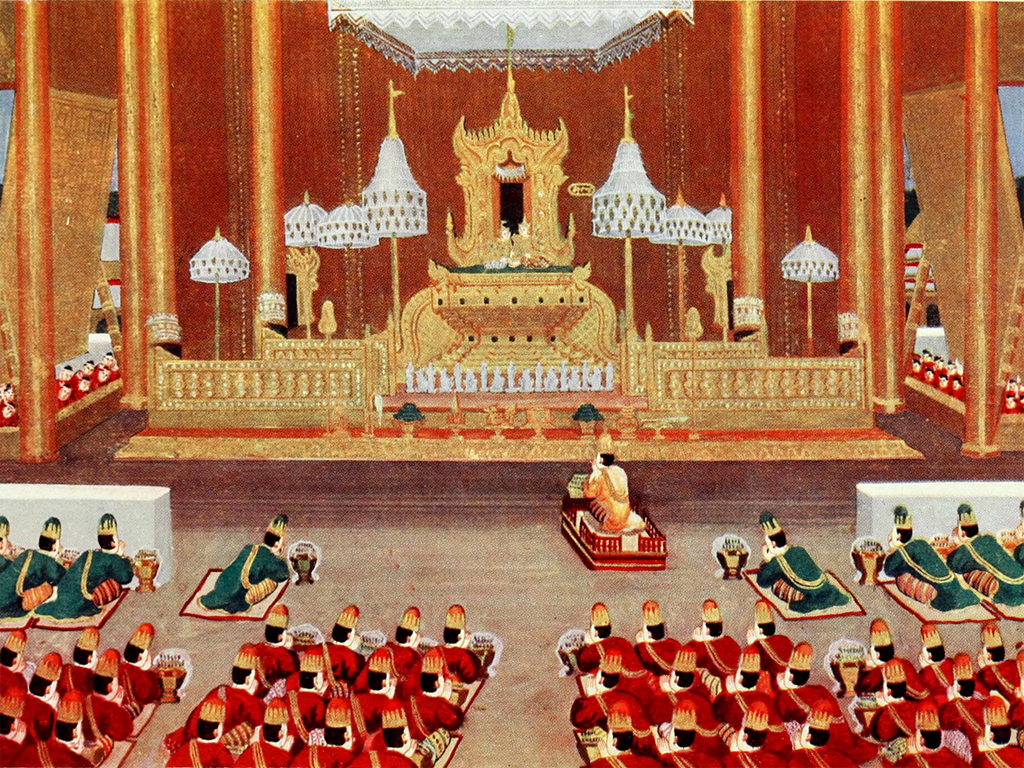
A 19th century Burmese painting depicting a royal audience

Razadarit immediately removed the veneer of friendly relations with Ava. He readily gave shelter to King Min Saw Mon (and/or Prince Min Khayi) of Launggyet Arakan. (Note: The chronicle Razadarit Ayedawbon says Razadarit took in Min Saw Mon but the Arakanese Rakhine Razawin Thit chronicle says it was Khayi, the brother of Min Saw Mon, that fled to Hanthawaddy; Min Saw Mon fled to Bengal.) A few months later, he welcomed Minkhaung's younger brother Prince Theiddat who had defected for being passed over as crown prince. More significantly, he stopped sending the annual shipment of elephants and the annual customs revenues of the port of Bassein as required per the 1403 Treaty of Kawliya. With the treaty now nullified, Pegu prepared for an Ava invasion after the rainy season.

However, the anticipated invasion never came. When they learned that Ava was busy suppressing a serious rebellion in Bhamo, the Hanthawaddy command deliberated their next steps. Over the next few months, they concluded that they must act while Ava was preoccupied in the north. They chose to capture Arakan first, which they believed would be easier than confronting Ava's formidable southern defenses. Razadarit did not make the decision lightly, as he was about to start a war against a far more populous kingdom. In January 1408, (Note: Tabodwe 769 ME (28 December 1407 – 25 January 1408)) the king prayed solemnly at the main pagoda of Pegu (presumably the Shwemawdaw) before finally authorizing the Arakan campaign.

== Hanthawaddy conquest of Arakan (1408) ==
=== Preparations ===
Pegu's general plan was to conquer Arakan swiftly by leveraging the popularity of Min Saw Mon. The Hanthawaddy command believed the dethroned king's presence would entice the local populace to join their side. Their battle plan called for capturing Sandoway (Thandwe) first, enlisting more men from southern Arakan, and finally attacking Launggyet in the north. An expeditionary force was organized, consisting of two divisions (totaling 4000 to 5000 troops), commanded by Smin Paik-Nye and Smin Maw-Khwin. By late February, the expeditionary force and the royal army commanded by Razadarit himself were all massed in Bassein.

Meanwhile, Ava was oblivious to the impending threat. Its main forces were still in Bhamo, and had not reinforced its nominal garrisons in Launggyet and Sandoway.

=== Campaign ===
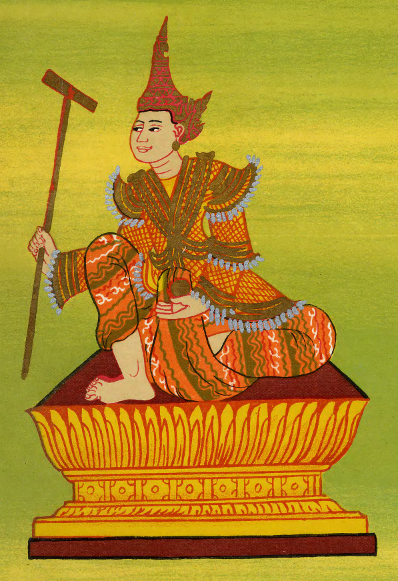
King Anawrahta of Launggyet portrayed as Shwe Nawrahta nat

The invasion began c. early March 1408. (Note: Citing the Razadarit Ayedawbon, the Yazawin Thit says Razadarit decided to attack Arakan in Tabodwe 769 ME (28 December 1407–25 January 1408), and sent in his invasion forces in [Late] Tagu 769 ME (25 February 1408–24 March 1408).) The Hanthawaddy expeditionary force took Sandoway unopposed. The small Ava garrison there had fled to Launggyet just prior. The allied forces—Min Saw Mon now commanded a force of his own—then marched to the capital. At Launggyet, the Ava-installed king Anawrahta tried to resist from behind the city walls. Three vanguard forces–led by Smin Sam Lek, Smin Lauk Ni-Ye and Min Saw Mon—quickly breached the defenses, and defeated the Ava garrison inside. Anawrahta, his queen Saw Pyei Chantha, and 300 household guards, were taken prisoner.

=== Aftermath ===
After the campaign, Min Saw Mon was restored to the Launggyet throne. Razadarit immediately recalled most of the expedition force. (Note: The Rakhine Razawin Thit chronicle says a garrison commanded by Smin Maw-Khwin stayed behind. But the Razadarit Ayedawbon says both commanders, Smin Paik-Nye and Smin Maw-Khwin, were called back. The main chronicles say Smin Maw-Khwin was one of the commanders at the Pegu front in April/May 1408.) The captured king and queen of Arakan were also brought back. Razadarit had Anawrahta executed, and took his queen, Saw Pyei Chantha, the 16-year-old daughter of Minkhaung, as one of his own.

The provocations worked. At Ava, a furious Minkhaung ordered an immediate invasion of Hanthawaddy. His court was aghast. With the rainy season only two months away, the ministers tried to persuade Minkhaung to delay the campaign. But the king insisted on an immediate invasion.

== First Ava invasion of Hanthawaddy (1408) ==
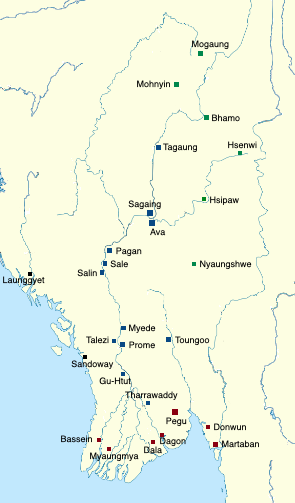
Ava and Hanthawaddy forces fought in Arakan on the western coast and along the Sittaung river near Pegu in 1408–1410.

=== Ava preparations ===
The Ava court hastily drew up a plan. Their first priority was to make peace with China. Minkhaung, who had not responded to the 1406 Chinese mission, finally sent an embassy to Beijing. Its purpose was to reassure the Yongle Emperor about Ava's intentions on their borderlands. The embassy, received on 28 May 1408, succeeded in lowering the tensions with China—at least temporarily. (Note: According to the Ming Shilu, The Ming court considered the Ava embassy, received on 28 May 1408, a "tribute mission".; The Ava mission offered a formal apology to the Yongle Emperor for "having occupied his younger brother's land [i.e. Maw (Mong Mao) or Luchuan-Pingmian] taken his property without authority”.; Over a year later, the Ming court assessed in September 1409 that Ava had not kept its word. The Emperor subsequently authorized military action against Ava.) Ava also dispatched an embassy to Chiang Mai to persuade the king of Lan Na (present-day northern Thailand) to open a front from Pegu's east. (Note: [Late] Tagu 769 ME (25 February 1408 to 24 March 1408)) However, the embassy veered into Hanthawaddy territory en route, and was arrested. Razadarit released the embassy back to Ava, with Minkhaung's letter to the king of Lan Na unsealed.

Ava would thus have to fight Pegu alone. By April, a vanguard army (22,000 troops, 2000 cavalry, 80 elephants), and a smaller army (4000 troops, 200 cavalry and 20 elephants) commanded by Minkhaung himself had been organized. To beat the rains, the Ava command decided to send both armies along the Sittaung river. This was the shortest path to Pegu but it was also much harder to supply. Their plan was to ship supplies via the Irrawaddy river to Prome (Pyay), and then transport them by land (over 200 km by modern roads) through the jungles of the Pegu Yoma range to the front.

=== Pegu battle plan ===
Hanthawaddy defenses were ready on both the Irrawaddy delta and Sittaung fronts. They expected invasion forces of around 15,000 infantry, 600 cavalry and 60 elephants. The plan called for ambushing the more numerous Ava troops along the invasion routes, and defending from inside fortified towns. Dein Mani-Yut would lead the defense of the delta while Razadarit himself would lead the defense of the Sittaung front with his main army (8000 troops, 300 cavalry, 20 elephants), operating out of Fort Thagyin (present-day Shwegyin), about 100 km northeast of Pegu. Smin Ye-Thin-Yan guarded the capital.

=== Invasion ===
Ava army in a 19th-century painting

==== Initial campaign ====
In April 1408, (Note: Kason 770 ME (29 March 1408–23 April 1408)) the Ava vanguard regiments began the invasion at the Sittaung front. A 500-strong vanguard regiment led by Lagun Ein promptly ambushed the enemy, inflicting high casualties before being driven back by the more numerous Ava troops. Spooked by the high losses, Minkhaung paused the invasion for another six days until more troops could arrive.

The pause allowed the Hanthawaddy command to readjust their plans. Based on Lagun Ein's report that Ava vanguard forces totaled at least 5,000 and perhaps even 10,000, they now reckoned the enemy strength to be over 20,000 on this front alone. They assessed that their frontline Thakyin fort probably could not hold out for long. After a contentious debate among his senior staff, Razadarit decided to pull back 70 km southwest to Fort Pankyaw, and called up reinforcements from the delta and Martaban provinces to Pankyaw. He also ordered all the main towns along the invasion route evacuated, and burned down, including the fief of his father-in-law and senior minister Zeik-Bye. (Note: Zeik-Bye had unsuccessfully argued for his town to be defended. (The town was either Thakyin per the Razadarit or Sittaung per the Pak Lat.) Before his town was being burned down, Zeik-Bye had no choice but to "lend" his seven viss (11.43 kg) of gold to the royal treasury.)

The scorched earth policy proved effective. Advancing Ava forces found nothing but scorched towns—12 in total—en route to Pankyaw. Though still early in the campaign, feeding the large number of troops was already a problem for the Ava command. Even as Ava forces took up their positions outside Pankyaw over five days in late April, (Note: According to the Razadarit, the first Ava forces arrived on one of the neap tide days the month (ရေသေရက်), four or five days before the tides began rising again (ရေတက်ရက်). Since neap tide days last for one week after the full moon day or the new moon day, the first Ava forces likely reached Pankyaw during the week following the new moon of Kason 770 ME (23 April 1408)—i.e., 24 April to 30 April 1408.) the troops were already resorting to foraging around the nearby burned out settlements.

==== Battle of Pankyaw ====
The battle began in early May. Ava forces struggled to reach the two frontline stockades, located on Thayo (သရို့) and Byatlan (ဗြတ်လန်း) streams, that guarded the westerly and easterly approaches to Pankyaw. As they had no experience fighting in the swampy terrains or tidal patterns, the invaders could not overcome 600 patrols men guarding the approaches to the stockades. Ava's small window of opportunity closed in late May when both the rainy season and more Hanthawaddy reinforcements from the delta and Martaban arrived. The Hanthawaddy troops at Pankyaw now totaled just over 10,000. (Note: Upon his arrival, Dein conducted a roll call of all the remaining troops, and found that the total strength was "exactly" 102,000 men. Adjusting down by an order of magnitude (per G.E. Harvey 1925) brings the strength to 10,200.)

Yet Minkhaung chose not to retreat—a decision that soon proved costly. In the following weeks, Ava's long supply lines—ambitious even in the best scenarios—were repeatedly ambushed by Smin Awa Naing's units. Starving Ava troops were forced to forage farther and farther, and many became victims of yet more Hanthawaddy ambushes. By late July, the situation had grown so dire that Minkhaung finally agreed to negotiate to secure a safe withdrawal. The king sent a delegation to the Hanthawaddy camp asking for terms.

==== Attempts on Minkhaung ====
"Fool, this is war. You'll kill me if you can. I'll kill you if I can. How can you trust anyone?"

— Commander Lagun Ein (Note: According to the Razadarit Ayedawbon, Thado asked Lagun Ein a routine question if Pegu was negotiating in good faith. Lagun Ein, who was never comfortable with Razadarit's plan, replied: "Fool, this is war. You'll kill me if you can. I'll kill you if I can. How can you trust anyone?")

Razadarit was in no mood for negotiations. Justifying that Minkhaung had first broken the 1403 peace treaty, the Hanthawaddy king devised a plan to assassinate Minkhaung at the negotiation table. But the plan could not be carried out as the Ava delegation became suspicious after Lagun Ein's blunt reply to a routine question. Razadarit ordered two more attempts on Minkhaung's life but both failed. The first attempt to ambush Minkhaung near the Ava camp was broken up on a warning by Theiddat who had come along with the Hanthawaddy units. It turned out that Theiddat could not betray his elder brother. Razadarit had Theiddat executed. In a second attempt, a 12-member unit led by Lagun Ein tried to infiltrate the Ava camp but ultimately had to retreat. (Note: All the main chronicles report that Lagun Ein even entered Minkhaung's tent but refused to kill a sleeping king. However, the Yazawin Thit says the story lacks credibility, and classified it as a legend.)

=== Withdrawal ===
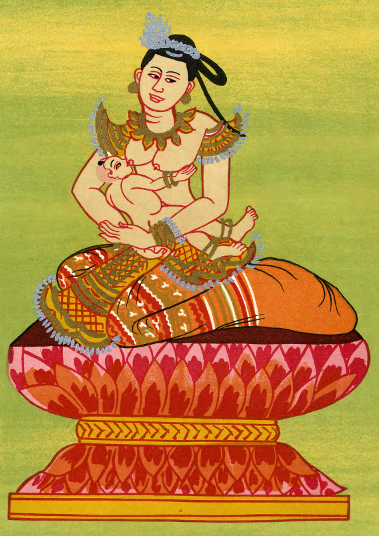
Queen Shin Mi-Nauk portrayed as the Anauk Mibaya nat

In August 1408, during the height of the rainy season, Ava forces began their painful withdrawal. Only able-bodied men were allowed to retreat; the wounded and the sick were left behind. A rearguard army (8,000 troops, 800 cavalry, 80 elephants) led by Sithu of Yamethin stayed behind to ensure a safe withdrawal for the king and his retinue. However, the Hanthawaddy command had anticipated such a move. A Hanthawaddy army pursued the Ava rearguard army, while another army led by Razadarit himself took another route to cut off Minkhaung's escape path. Razadarit's army caught up with Minkhaung's army near the frontier—at Maw Lyin, or Maw Baw. In the ensuing battle, only the Ava units guarding Minkhaung managed to bring their king to safety. The remaining slower caravan of horses and elephants carrying civilian members, including Queen Shin Mi-Nauk, was captured. Likewise, only a small portion of the rearguard army made it back to Ava territory; the majority of its troops, horses and elephants were killed, or captured.

Following this total victory, Razadarit claimed Shin Mi-Nauk—both Mi-Nauk and her daughter Saw Pyei Chantha were now in his harem. At Ava, Minkhaung remained in a state of shock for weeks while Mi-Nauk's eldest son, Minye Kyawswa "became a fiend".

== Events in 1408–1409 ==
Different sources report conflicting events during the following 12 months. The main royal chronicles, which primarily narrate from the Ava side, report no campaigns until late 1409. According to the chronicles, a remorseful Minkhaung admitted to his court that he had acted in anger and haste, and promised that the next Hanthawaddy campaign would be better planned, setting the campaign date a year later, to late 1409. Then in 1409, he ordered conscriptions throughout the kingdom, including from its vassal Shan states, for the Hanthawaddy campaign.

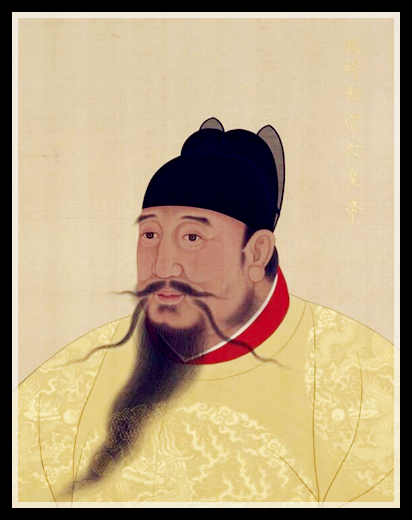
The Yongle Emperor authorized a punitive expedition against Ava in 1409.

However, according to other sources, Ava remained militarily active in Arakan and in the Shan states in 1408–1409. On the western front, the Rakhine Razawin Thit chronicle states that Minkhaung sent an expeditionary force led by the lord of Myinsaing to Arakan, which retook and occupied Launggyet, until Hanthawaddy forces returned and drove them back out again. Ava managed to retain a foothold in Arakan at Nga-khway-thin-daung (ငခွေးသင်းတောင်) for another three years. (Notably, the Razadarit Ayedawbon, which narrates from the Hanthawaddy side, does not mention anything about any 1408–1409 campaign by Hanthawaddy forces in Arakan. (Note: After Minkhaung's second campaign, the Razadarit's narrative proceeds directly to Minye Kyawswa's first campaign. See (Pan Hla 2005: 271).))

On the northern front, the Hsenwi Yazawin chronicle states that Ava forces twice "invaded" Hsenwi in 1409. (Note: The hostilities between Ava and Hsenwi may have started as early as 1408.: The Hsenwi Yazawin says Ava "invaded" Hsenwi twice in 771 ME (1409/10)—first by the lord of Pagan, and another by the lord of Pagan and "King" [sic] Minye Kyawswa.; According to Sai Kam Mong and Luang Tha Aye, the sawbwa of Hsenwi surrendered in 1416 [1416/17], after eight years of war with Ava, meaning the conflict started c. 1408/09.) According to the Chinese Ming records, the sawbwa of Hsenwi complained to the Emperor about Ava. The Ming court investigated the matter, and determined by September 1409 that Ava had not kept its 1408 promise not to interfere in the borderlands. The Yongle Emperor, enjoying a brief respite from the rebellions in Dai Viet, reassured the sawbwa of Hsenwi, and subsequently authorized a punitive expedition against Ava. The Ming court recognized Razadarit as a Chinese tributary ruler, although their attempt to bring Maw (Mong Mao), the powerful Shan state between Burmese and Chinese Shan states, to the Chinese side would not be successful until 1411.

== Second Ava invasion of Hanthawaddy (1409–1410) ==
=== Preparations ===
At Ava, Minkhaung was still set on another invasion of the south. In a nod to the developing situation in the north, he did concede to a smaller campaign. Two smaller armies would once again invade via the Toungoo–Sittaung route. The vanguard army (10,000 troops, 1000 cavalry, 80 elephants) was led by Sithu Pauk Hla of Yamethin, and the royal army (4000 troops, 400 cavalry, 20 elephants) was commanded by Minkhaung himself. Just as in 1408, the supplies would be sent via the Irrawaddy and Prome. Minkhaung had assigned his middle son Thihathu to head up the supply operations, and his eldest son Minye Kyawswa to guard the capital.

At Pegu, Razadarit initially doubted the intelligence that Ava planned to invade with a much smaller force via the same route. He questioned his staff as to why Minkhaung, after failing with over 20,000 troops, would try again with half the number. The Pegu battle plan remained the same: lure the enemy towards Fort Pankyaw, ambush them, and annihilate them at the right time. To that end, additional stockades had been built up around Pankyaw.

=== Invasion ===
In October 1409, (Note: The campaign lasted "about five months" towards the end of 771 ME (30 March 1409 to 29 March 1410). This means the campaign probably started c. October 1409.) the two Ava armies invaded via the Sittaung front. They faced little resistance until they approached the frontline stockades near Fort Pankyaw. Minkhaung's smaller army set up camp near the Byat Lan stockade. Razadarit, who happened to be touring a nearby stockade, learned of the news. Against his staff's advice, he ordered his forces to engage the enemy in an open battle. Three or four days later, the first and only major battle of the campaign ensued in a field outside Arnan, near Byat Lan. As the two armies clashed, the two kings on their respective war elephants came to face to face. Razadarit, riding a smaller elephant, had to retreat, and nearly became cornered by the sawbwa of Onbaung until Byat Za on his elephant intervened to free Razadarit. As more Ava troops arrived on the scene, Hanthawaddy forces withdrew. Both sides had taken heavy casualties.

After the close call, Razadarit handed the command to Byat Za who reorganized Hanthawaddy defenses to stay behind the walls. As they did not have enough troops to storm the forts, Ava forces lurked around for another four months before withdrawing c. February/March 1410. Hanthawaddy forces did not pursue the enemy this time.

=== Aftermath ===
Once back in Ava, Minkhaung was pressed by the court to address the open issues on both fronts. On the northern front, the king, in consultation with Chief Minister Min Yaza, decided to defend the Shan states under Ava's control. In March 1410, he appointed Thado, one of his proteges, sawbwa of Mohnyin to serve as Ava's bulwark in the north.

The decision for the Hanthawaddy war took much longer. Though Minkhaung realized that he did not have enough manpower to defeat Pegu, he could not bear to end the war either. For weeks, he was at a loss as to what to do until his eldest son Crown Prince Minye Kyawswa asked for the command of the southern front, vowing to hunt down Razadarit like Porisāda, the cannibal king of Buddhist lore. (Note: Upon hearing about Minye Kyawswa's vow that he would devour Razadarit like the cannibal king Porisāda in the Buddhist Mahasutasoma jataka, Razadarit remarked that he then must be Sutasoma, the protagonist in the jataka, and subsequently assumed the title of Sutasoma.) Minkhaung ultimately decided to continue the war—albeit on a limited scale. He handed the southern command to his 19-year-old son, giving him 14,000 troops—the same level of troops as in the 1409–1410 campaign—for the next dry season campaign. Given the tenuous situation in the north, only two Shan regiments (from Onbaung and Nyaungshwe) were assigned to the invasion force; the rest were drawn from central and southern vassals.

== Third Ava invasion of Hanthawaddy (1410–1411) ==
=== Preparations ===
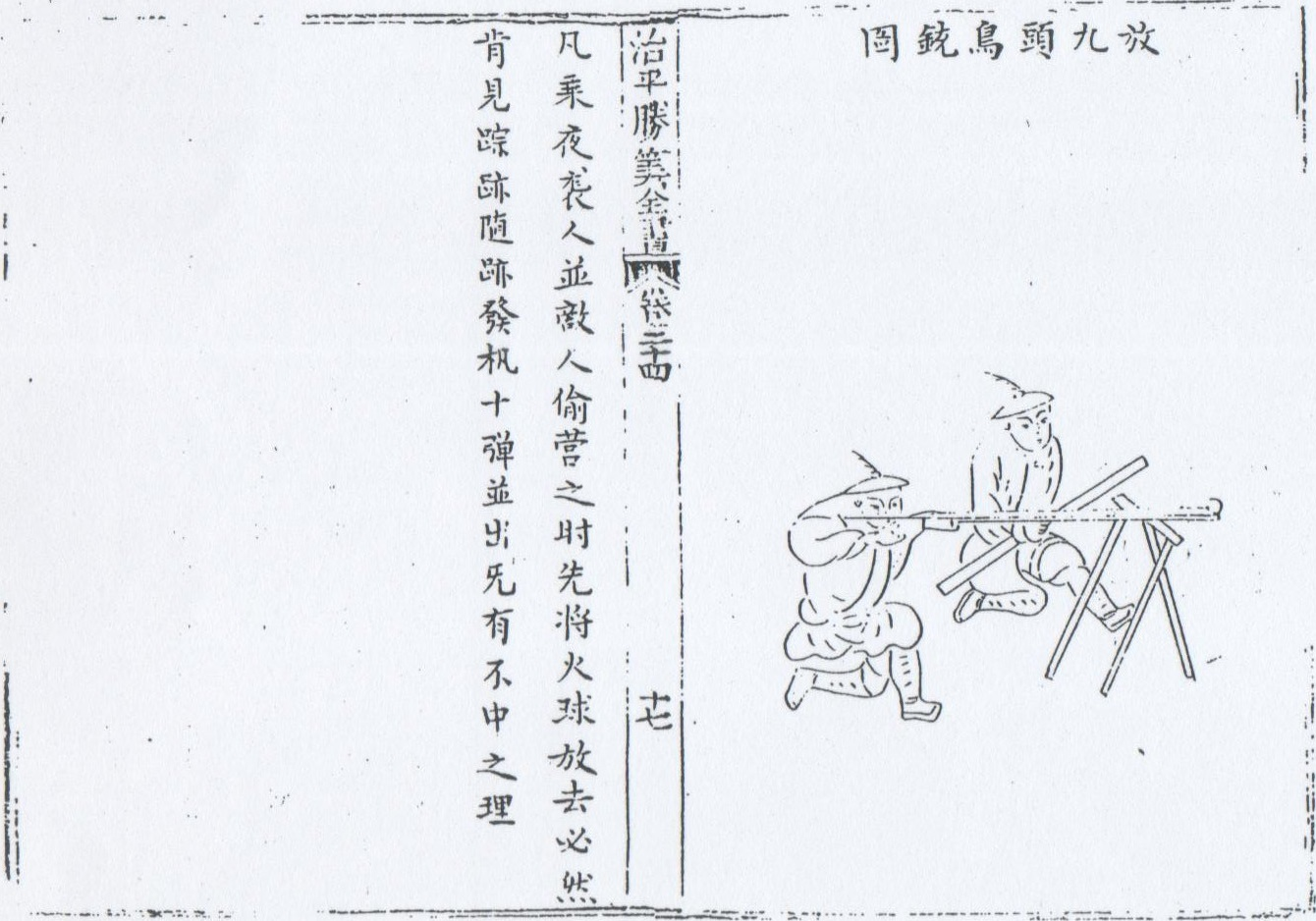
Hanthawaddy defenses included jingal wall guns. An example of a jingal gun used by the Chinese is shown here.

Given his limited resources, Minye Kyawswa altered Ava's battle plan. Instead of directly attacking the well-defended Pegu capital region via the Sittaung, he decided to invade what he believed was the less defended Irrawaddy delta. He took command of the expedition force that included one army (7,000 troops, 600 cavalry, 40 elephants) and a navy (7000 troops, 7 large war boats, 70 war boats, 20 armored war boats, 20 transport boats, 30 supply boats). The seven large war boats (each about 47 meters in length) carried important members of the ruling elite.

The Hanthawaddy command was prepared for a delta invasion. Their plan relied on the delta's difficult terrain, which included "nine major tributaries with sizable widths and strong currents" as well as "dozens of large streams", making fast movements, especially east–west ones, practically impossible. Razadarit assigned his top generals in the key delta cities: Byat Za at Myaungmya, Dein at Bassein, and Smin Than-Kye at Khebaung. The port cities were defended by squadrons of war boats and jingal wall guns. The king planned to lead the defense of the Pegu capital region himself.

=== Invasion of the Irrawaddy delta ===
==== Battle of Myaungmya ====
In late 1410, Ava land and naval forces invaded the delta. The army launched an attack on Khebaung from Tharrawaddy while Minye Kyawswa and the navy bypassed the port. The navy sailed down towards Myaungmya in the southwestern delta, and faced no resistance until it reached Daybathwe, a stockade near Myaungmya. The garrison there put up a fight but the fort was quickly overrun.

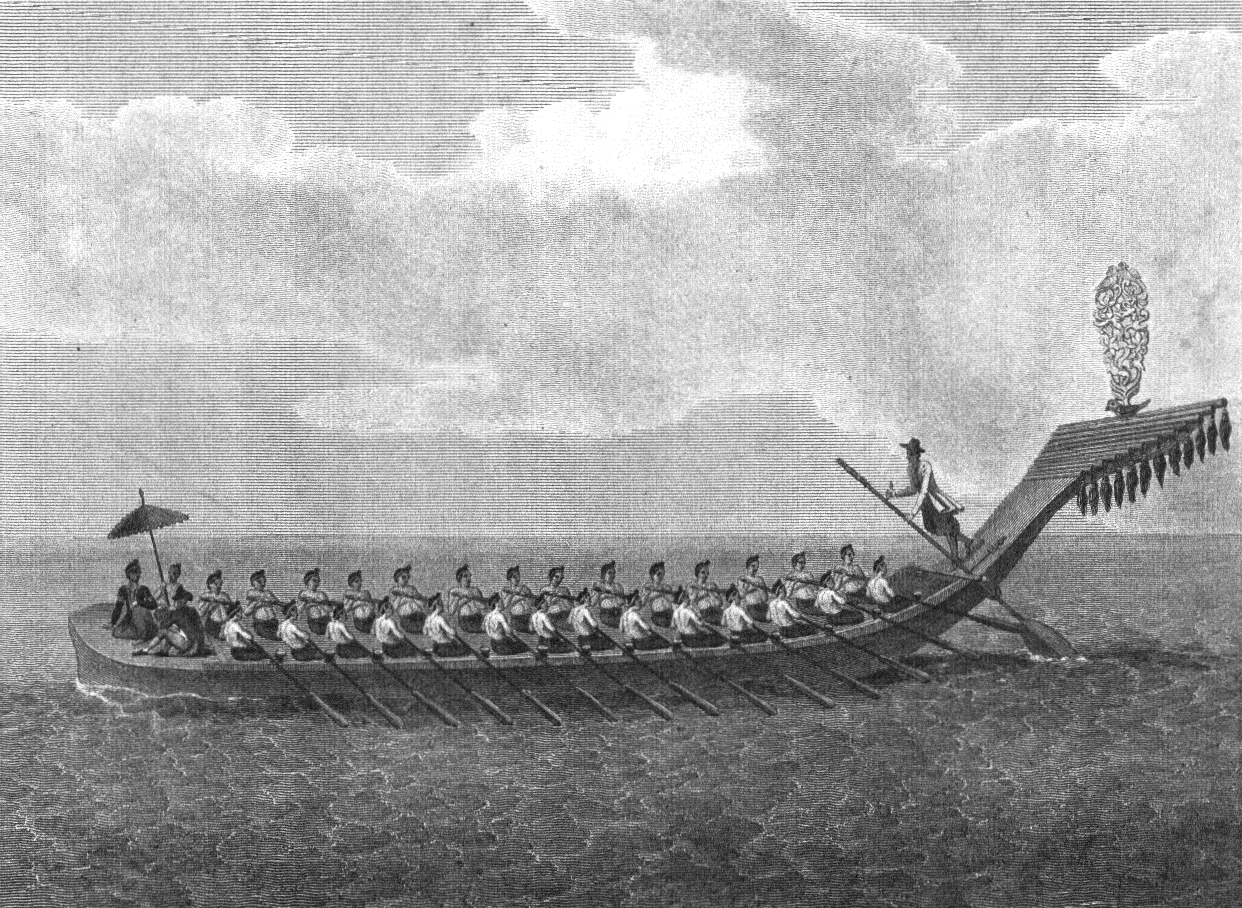
An 18th-century painting of a Burmese war boat on the Irrawaddy River

Buoyed by the initial success, Minye Kyawswa ordered a direct naval attack on Myaungmya. The crown prince personally led the initial charge against the Hanthawaddy flotilla guarding the port, and succeeded in creating a gap 10 to 13 meters wide in the enemy's riverine defenses. However, enemy boats soon swarmed them, forcing him to retreat, and stranding several troops and war boats, including Minye Kyawswa's own richly decorated war boat, in the tidal swamps. After the close call, the crown prince switched to attacking by land, which also proved to be a slow grind. Ava forces took heavy casualties from Hanthawaddy ambushes en route before reaching the outskirts of the city after several days. Their several attempts to take the city—including sending down fire rafts and Minye Kyawswa charging with 2000 elite Shan troops—all failed. A period of uneasy stalemate ensued.

To break the stalemate, Byat Za sent an embassy, led by his own wife Princess Tala Mi Baik, carrying his letter addressed to the crown prince. In the letter, the minister-general in respectful diplomatic language stated that the city was well provisioned to last several years, and that reinforcements from Pegu would soon arrive since Razadarit had just put down a rebellion in Hlaingbwe (Note: According to Arthur Purves Phayre, the rebellion may have been an attack by Lan Na (Chiang Mai), "probably prompted by the king of Burma [Ava]".) (in present-day Kayin State). Byat Za also apologized for his forces' attack on the crown prince's war boat, and returned the ornamental silver plates removed from the captured vessel. The "elite-to-elite negotiation" worked. Recognizing the threat of Hanthawaddy reinforcements, Minye Kyawswa accepted Byat Za's face-saving offer, and withdrew from Myaungmya.

==== Withdrawal from the delta ====
Minye Kyawswa was not ready to retreat empty-handed however. He swung by Bassein, 40 km northwest of Myaungmya. His forces could not get anywhere near the fortified city, whose defenses included numerous jingal wall guns. After several days, he ended the siege, and withdrew towards Khebaung. There too, he found his army kept at a distance by the enemy guns. After several more days, c. early 1411, (Note: Chronicles do not provide a date as to when the withdrawal took place. Arthur Purves Phayre's conjecture is "after several months' operations".) the prince acknowledged that a continued siege was futile, and asked his staff for advice on how to salvage the campaign. Governor Sithu of Yamethin argued that the Hanthawaddy provinces were all too well defended, and that they should instead attack in a less defended Arakan in the remaining campaign season. The crown prince agreed with the assessment, and ordered a full withdrawal to their base in Prome (Pyay).

=== Invasion of Arakan ===
==== Ava reconquest of Arakan ====
Once at Prome, Minye Kyawswa quickly reorganized his forces for the Arakan front. He transferred most of his naval troops to the army, and led the enlarged army to Launggyet. Unlike in the delta, Ava forces found no resistance en route as King Min Saw Mon had not expected an invasion. Launggyet defenses could not stop a three-pronged attack by Ava forces. The king himself barely escaped, and fled to Bengal on a boat. Ava forces quickly marched south, and took Sandoway. Minye Kyawswa appointed Letya and Sokkate as garrison commanders of Launggyet and Sandoway, respectively, and returned home c. March 1411. Back in Ava, Minye Kyawswa was feted by his father for the victorious campaign.

==== Hanthawaddy recapture of Sandoway ====
The celebration proved premature. Two Hanthawaddy divisions (5000 troops, 200 cavalry and 50 elephants), commanded by Smin Bya Paik and Smin E-Kaung-Pein, launched a counterattack on Sandoway c. April 1411. After a few days of fighting, they drove out the Ava garrison. Instead of pursuing the enemy to northern Arakan, they frantically rebuilt Sandoway's defenses in anticipation of Ava's counterattack.

==== Ava siege of Sandoway ====
As expected, Minye Kyawswa rushed back to Sandoway with an army (8000 troops, 300 cavalry, 30 elephants). Upon arrival, he launched several attacks to retake the city before the rains. The city's reinforced fortifications successfully held off the attacks, and extracted heavy enemy casualties. He was now forced to lay siege to the city as the rainy season began. The siege went on for another three months. The Sandoway garrison twice attempted to break the siege but both attempts failed. As the starving city was reaching its breaking point, Commander Bya Paik sent two envoys carrying a letter supposedly sent by Razadarit. The letter described a sizable relief force (4000 troops, 200 cavalry, 50 elephants) marching to relieve the town, and the envoys allowed themselves to be caught by Ava patrols. The desperate stratagem worked. Minye Kyawswa found the letter credible, and assumed even more reinforcements could follow after the rainy season. He decided to withdraw, vowing to return after the rainy season was over. (Note: Chronicles do not agree on which rain season.: The main chronicles say Minye Kyawswa took Sithu Pauk Hla of Yamethin's advice to return after the rainy season was over. which normally would mean in another two or three months (c. November 1411).; The Razadarit Ayedawbon says Minye Kyawswa decided to return after the rainy season in the following year ("after the new year had turned").)

== Ava's multi-front war (1411–1412) ==
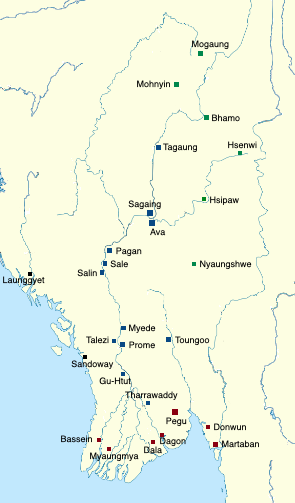
Ava forces fought in the southern (Hanthawaddy), western (Arakan) and northern (Shan states) theaters

=== Preparations ===
Despite the vow, Minye Kyawswa would never return to Arakan. Back in Ava, he learned that Minkhaung had shifted focus to the northern front for an imminent showdown with Hsenwi and China. By August 1411, the Ming court had brought Maw (Mong Mao), the major Shan state at the border, to its side, and subsequently authorized its vassal Hsenwi to invade Ava. For the first time in the war, Minkhaung took the Chinese threat seriously, and prioritized the northern front, and scrapped the seasonal campaigns elsewhere. The Ava command raised a reserve army for the northern front (7000 troops, 300 cavalry, 20 elephants), mainly of northern regiments. This army, commanded by Minye Kyawswa, was stationed in Ava. Ava's southern and western defenses were based out of Prome and Launggyet, respectively.

Despite Ava's fears, its enemies failed to launch any coordinated attacks at the start of the 1411–1412 dry season. Hsenwi was planning a major invasion deep into Ava territory but the actual invasion was still a few months away. Likewise, the Hanthawaddy command was initially in a defensive stance. They chose to invade northern Arakan only when no Ava invasions arrived.

=== Western front: Hanthawaddy invasion of northern Arakan (1411–1412) ===
In late 1411, Hanthawaddy forces, assisted by local Arakanese militias, laid siege to Launggyet. The Ava garrison held out for months, waiting for relief forces. However, no reinforcements arrived, and the garrison was ultimately defeated. (Note: (Fernquest Spring 2006: 17) says the Ava garrison "supposedly voluntarily withdrew", citing San Lwin's translation of the Razadarit Ayedawbon, and the Maha Yazawin. However, Nai Pan Hla's version of the Razadarit as well as the main chronicles say the Ava garrison there put up a long fight before withdrawing.) Ava commanders Letya and Sokkate managed to escape. (Note: The Maha Yazawin says Letya and Sokkate were captured, and brought to Pegu. Other chronicles the Razadarit, Yazawin Thit and Hmannan all say the two commanders escaped.) Letya fell back to Ava's remaining fort at Nga-khway-thin-daung. Hanthawaddy forces pursued him and drove him out, ending the garrison's three-year stint in Arakan. Min Saw Mon was then restored to the Launggyet throne.

=== Northern front: Ava vs. Hsenwi and China (1412) ===
==== Hsenwi invasion of Ava ====
In the meantime, war finally broke out in Ava's northern front. Circa April 1412, (Note: Chronicles report different dates for the start of the Hsenwi war.: The Maha Yazawin and the Razadarit Ayedawbon give 773 ME (30 March 1411 to 28 March 1412); The Yazawin Thit and Hmannan chronicles say the main battle of Wetwin took place in [early] 774 ME (c. April 1412).) Hsenwi forces invaded Hsipaw, the Ava vassal state located 120 km southwest of Hsenwi, forcing its sawbwa Tho Kyaung Bwa to flee to Ava. The sawbwa of Hsenwi, Hkam Hkai Hpa, continued marching down the dirt roads of the Shan Hills towards Ava (Inwa), some 220 km southwest of Hsipaw. In response, Minye Kyawswa left Ava with his northern army to intercept the enemy.

The two armies ran into each other at Wetwin, about 80 km away from Ava. The first skirmishes occurred between the respective calvary forces, and the more numerous Ava cavalry defeated the Hsenwi cavalry. When the top Hsenwi commanders—the sawbwa, his son and his son-in-law, on their war elephants—did not retreat, they quickly became targets of Ava elephantry led by Minye Kyawswa himself. In the ensuing battle, the sawbwa was killed, after which most of the remaining Hsenwi forces fled. About 300 Hsenwi troops fell while about 800 troops, 200 horses and six elephants were captured.

==== Siege of Hsenwi ====
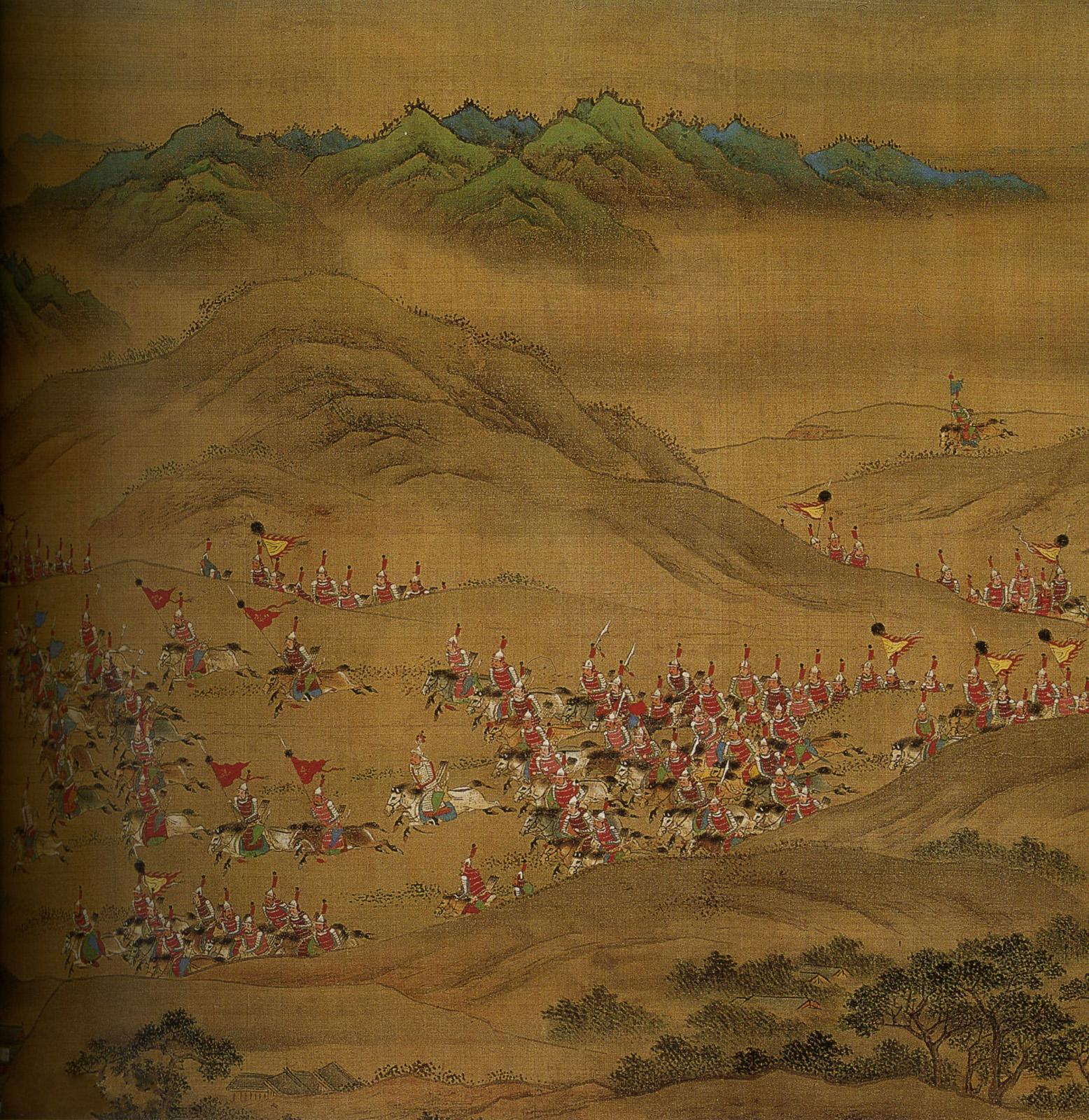
Ming cavalry

Ava was now on the offensive. Minye Kyawswa pursued the retreating Hsenwi forces all the way to Hsenwi, about 260 km northeast of Wetwin. Hsenwi forces, now led by the son of the fallen sawbwa, (Note: The main chronicles do not name who the son was. According to the South Hsenwi Yazawin, the fallen sawbwa Hkam Hkai had three sons: Hkam Hawt, Hkam Yawt and Hkam Lat. The middle son Hkam Yawt succeeded as the next sawbwa of Hsenwi.) called in Chinese military assistance, and shut the gates. When rains arrived in late May, Minye Kyawswa decided to lay siege to an enemy city in the rainy season for the second consecutive year. Hsenwi had stockpiled enough provisions, and its defenders held out for Chinese relief forces.

Ava forces were prepared for the Chinese intervention. Five months into the siege, c. October 1412, a Chinese army (20,000 men and 2000 cavalry) marched through the Sinkhan forest on the approach to the city. Unbeknownst to them, four Ava regiments (4000 men, 300 horses, 20 elephants) waited outside the forest, and ambushed the Chinese as they emerged. Five Chinese commanders, 2000 troops and 1000 horses were taken prisoner.

The siege continued one more month when Minye Kyawswa was recalled to the southern front. Razadarit had invaded towards Prome. In response, Minkhaung marched down to relieve Prome, and ordered Minye Kyawswa to join him in the south.

== First Hanthawaddy invasion of Ava (1412–1413) ==
=== Preparations ===
The Hanthawaddy command began planning for an invasion immediately after the Ava–Hsenwi war began. Their main objective was to divert a large portion of Ava forces to the south. By November, they had raised an army (12,000 troops, 800 cavalry, 30 elephants) in addition to 12 naval flotillas. The commander of Ava's southern defenses, Governor Letya Pyanchi of Prome, had anticipated the invasion, and stockpiled provisions for a long siege.

=== Siege of Prome ===
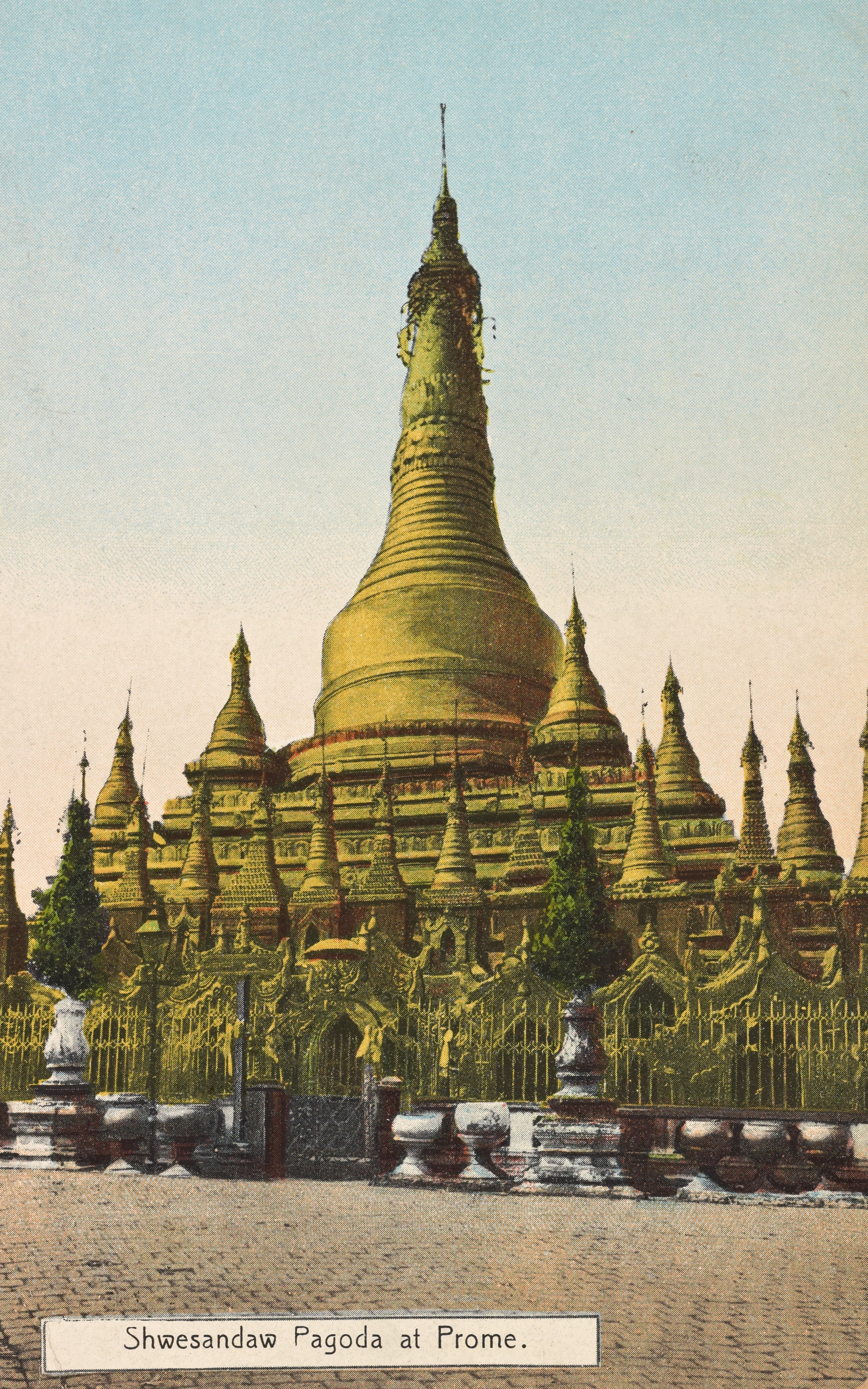
The Myathitin (Shwesandaw) Pagoda in Prome (Pyay) where Minkhaung and Razadarit signed the first peace treaty of 1403

The invasion began c. 8 November 1412. (Note: The Razadarit Ayedawbon says Razadarit launched the invasion of Prome on the 5th waxing of Nadaw 770 ME (27 November 1408). The 770 ME is a typographical error. The 5th waxing of Nadaw 774 ME would be 8 November 1412.) Hanthawaddy land and naval forces, led by Razadarit himself, overran Ava defenses en route to Prome but Prome's jingal guns kept the invaders at bay. To prepare for a long siege, the Hanthawaddy command ordered the construction of a large stockade across the Irrawaddy in Talezi. Surrounded by a deep moat on its three land sides, the riverside stockade was intended to disrupt Ava's riverine operations both into Prome and further south. In response, Minkhaung prepared to march down with an army to relieve Prome, and recalled Minye Kyawswa from Hsenwi.

The campaign's dynamics suddenly changed about a month later. A Siamese army led by Lord of Kamphaeng Phet invaded Hanthawaddy's southernmost districts, and advanced to Ye. Faced with a two-front war, Razadarit carved out an army (5000 troops, 400 cavalry, 10 elephants) for the Prome front. He gave the overall command to his son Prince Binnya Bassein, and appointed experienced deputies, including his son-in-law Smin Upakaung. The king then left for the Ye front with the remainder of his forces. Minkhaung arrived shortly after with a large army (12,000 troops, 600 cavalry, 40 elephants) but the Hanthawaddy forces had already moved across the river to Fort Talezi.

=== Battle of Talezi ===
Ava forces now tried to take Talezi. Even after Minye Kyawswa later joined the offensive, Ava troops could not breach the defenses, led by Upakaung, either from the river or land sides. Flummoxed, Minye Kyawswa invited Upakaung ostensibly to negotiate a settlement, offering him a governorship on par with Prome if he would defect. Upakaung refused, declaring his loyalty as a son-in-law of his royal paternal uncle Razadarit.

The siege continued for months, and the Hanthawaddy garrison's situation grew dire. However, because Razadarit's southern campaign was taking longer than expected, Pegu could only send in a small relief force which was crushed at Tayokmaw, south of Prome. Four months into the siege, in March 1413, as the garrison was on the verge of collapse, Razadarit finally defeated the Siamese, and returned to Pegu. His advisors urged him to replenish his forces, and return to Talezi only after the new year (after 30 March 1413). The king rejected the advice, and ordered his remaining land and naval forces to the Prome front. While en route to Talezi, his ailing general, Byat Za, met with the king one last time before dying three days later.

The Hanthawaddy command then ordered a two-pronged attack on Talezi. The navy led the main charge while the army quietly approached the Ava lines guarding the fort. The navy's commander, Lagun Ein riding a long flagship war boat 40 (or 49) meters long, (Note: 22 lan (လံ; 40.2 m (132 ft)), or 27 lan (လံ; 49.4 m (162 ft))) led the charge into the Ava navy guarding the river. While the Hanthawaddy navy was driven back after an intense battle, the Hanthawaddy army broke Ava lines, allowing the garrison to escape to safety. Lagun Ein was mortally wounded, and died later that day. The Ava high command sent his body downriver on a raft with full military honors. Razadarit ordered a full withdrawal the next day.

=== Withdrawal ===
The Ava navy led by Minye Kyawswa pursued the enemy down the Irrawaddy. They overwhelmed the first Hanthawaddy rearguard flotilla led by Smin Awa Naing near Tayokmaw, sinking 14 Hanthawaddy boats and causing 300 casualties; Awa Naing barely escaped. The following day, the Ava navy defeated a second rearguard flotilla led by Smin Sam Lek near Hsabaga, gaining control of the border area.

== Fourth Ava invasion of Hanthawaddy (1413) ==
=== Deliberations ===
Minye Kyawswa proposed an immediate invasion upon Minkhaung's arrival at Hsabaga three days later. The crown prince and Letya Pyanchi argued that Hanthawaddy forces were overspent from fighting their two-front war, and their delta defenses were thinly manned; although the rainy season was less than two months away, Ava forces could take the delta, and perhaps even advance towards Pegu, during this window of opportunity. Minkhaung was skeptical but authorized a limited invasion of the delta.

=== Invasion ===
In April 1413, Ava forces invaded the delta. Because Razadarit had pulled back much of his forces to the Pegu capital region, the invaders faced minimal resistance. They quickly seized the key delta forts of Khebaung and Dala; the Hanthawaddy commander of Dala, Smin Awa Naing, simply evacuated the town. Minye Kyawswa pressed on towards Pegu, capturing Dagon and Syriam in quick succession. However, the rapid advance came to a sudden halt after a failed attack on Hmawbi in which Pyanchi was mortally wounded. Faced with reinforced defenses on the Pegu front, Minye Kyawswa sent his forces to the western delta to capture Myaungmya and Bassein. By May 1413, (Note: Nayon 775 ME (30 April 1413–28 May 1413).) the entire delta was now under Ava control.

"Why, when I was a lad of sixteen with only two score men at my back, I won half my kingdom. Minkhaung has a real son; you sons of mine are useless."

— Razadarit in a motivational speech to his sons

Although the rainy season was imminent, Minye Kyawswa pressed on. Against his father's explicit orders, the crown prince reopened the Pegu front. By then, the Hanthawaddy defenses had been reinforced. Three Hanthawaddy regiments led by three sons of Razadarit successfully drove back Minye Kyawswa's cavalry. Separately, another Hanthawaddy army drove out the Ava garrison at Syriam led by Tarabya I of Pakhan. This ended Ava's campaign—for now.

=== Aftermath ===
Minye Kyawswa decided to wait out the rainy season, taking over the acting governorship of Prome in July 1413. For their part, the Hanthawaddy command searched for ways to avoid a full-scale invasion especially since their eastern flank remained vulnerable. Their solution was to get Hsenwi to open Ava's northern front as soon as possible. To that end, Razadarit sent an embassy carrying seven viss (11.43 kg) of gold to Hsenwi (via Chiang Mai).

== Ava's northern and western fronts (1413–1414) ==
Razadarit's diplomatic efforts paid immediate dividends. As ordered by the Ming court, Hsenwi reopened the northern front during the rainy season. According to the Ming Shilu, Hsenwi forces raided Ava's northern territories, destroying "over 20 cities and stockades". The sawbwa of Hsenwi presented the captured elephants, horses, and other goods at the Chinese capital in September 1413. The Burmese royal chronicles confirm that Hsenwi forces raided Ava's territories during the rainy season, and that forces from Maw (Mawdon Mawke; Mong Mao) continued raiding the outskirts of Ava's northernmost garrison at Myedu even after the rains ended.

In response, Minkhaung recalled Minye Kyawswa to handle the northern crisis. The king transferred his middle son Thihathu to the south. Minye Kyawswa's departure from Prome led to the full withdrawal of Ava forces from the delta. At Ava, the crown prince took command of a large army (11 regiments, 8000 troops, 400 horses and 30 elephants) and marched to Myedu. His forces defeated Maw forces at Myedu, chased the enemy to the Chinese border, and returned to Ava with captured men, women, elephants and horses.

On the western Arakan front, Ava reestablished the Nga-khway-thin-daung fort in 1413/14. (Note: Ava established the Nga-khway-thin-daung fort in Arakan in 770 ME (1408/09). Three years later, [773 ME (1411/12)] Hanthawaddy forces drove out the Ava garrison. Ava reestablished the fort in 775 ME (1413/14). Arakanese forces drove out Ava forces for good in 778 ME (1416/17).)

== Fifth Ava invasion of Hanthawaddy (1414–1415) ==
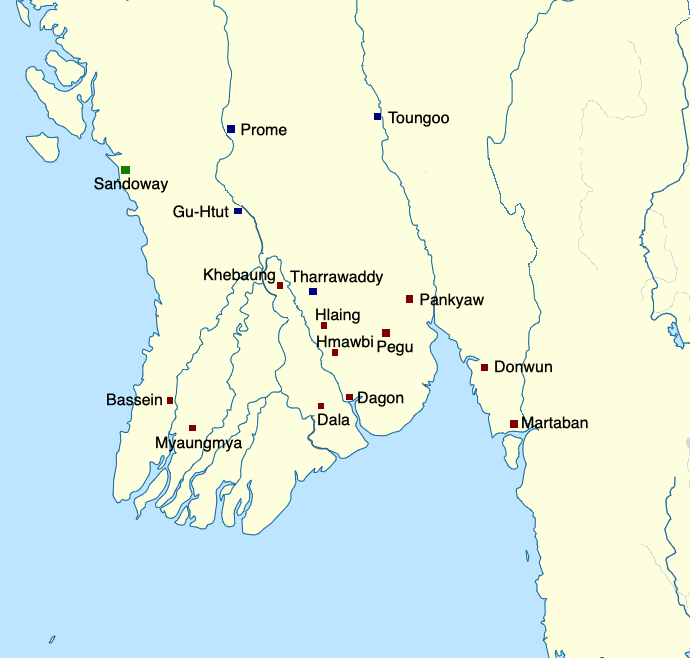
Ava forces attacked via Khebaung, Bassein, Myaungmya, Dala, Syriam and Dagon

=== Ava battle plan ===
Following the successful northern campaign, Minye Kyawswa advocated for a full-scale invasion of the south. However, Minkhaung remained cautious, given the unresolved situation in the north. The king allocated a sizable joint land and naval force for the southern campaign though it was less than Minye Kyawswa had sought. The general plan was to attack the western Irrawaddy delta (targeting Khebaung, Bassein, and Myaungmya), and then capture the southeastern delta ports of Dala and Dagon before advancing on Pegu.

Minye Kyawswa served as overall commander-in-chief, leading the main army (8000 men, 200 horses and 80 elephants). His deputy Nawrahta of Salin commanded the navy (13,000 men, 1800 ships of all sizes). Prince Thihathu commanded five marine regiments, charged with safeguarding the supply lines. Separately, a regiment led by Thinkhaya I of Toungoo guarded the Sittaung front though this sector was not part of the planned invasion.

=== Pegu battle plan ===
The Hanthawaddy defenses were ready. The Hanthawaddy command had used the year-and-a-half respite to repair and strengthen key fortifications especially at Khebaung, Bassein, Myaungmya and Dala. Bassein and Myaungmya were also defended by naval flotillas. The capital Pegu had stockpiled a year's worth of provisions and supplies.

Veteran commanders led all key delta ports: Smin Ye-Thin-Yan at Khebaung; Dein Mani-Yut at Bassein and Smin Saw-Htut at Myaungmya. While the defense of the eastern delta was nominally assigned to Razadarit's sons—Prince Binnya Bassein at the border near Hsabaga; and Prince Binnya Dala at Dala—the princes were advised by veteran commanders. On the Sittaung front, Smin Maw-Khwin held command at Fort Sayat.

=== Initial campaign ===
==== Battle of Khebaung ====
"In all my service, Ye-Thin-Yan stood unmatched as a warden of defense; for the charge, Byat Za and Lagun Ein were the most excellent."

— Wistful remark by King Razadarit when informed of Ye-Thin-Yan's death at Khebaung

The invasion began in early October 1414 (Note: The invasion took place in early or before Tazaungmon 776 ME (13 October 1414 to 11 November 1414) when Razadarit evacuated to Martaban (Mottama). Since dry season campaigns typically began after the end of the Buddhist Lent, the invasion likely began after the full moon of Thadingyut 776 ME (28 September 1414).) with a joint naval and land assault on Fort Khebaung. For five consecutive days, Hanthawaddy troops repulsed repeated attacks, inflicting heavy casualties on the invaders. A second attack, launched a few days later, also failed. Few troops who managed to cross the fort's moat were cut down while scaling the walls; the attack was called off after three hours. (Note: The battle lasted about 1 baho (3 hours).) A furious Minye Kyawswa ordered another attack the next day, declaring that anyone who failed to charge would be executed. He then personally led the assault on his favorite war elephant, Nga Chit Khaing, along with his elite regiment of 800 men. The tactic succeeded. Despite heavy casualties, Ava forces breached the gates. The fort fell, and Commander Ye-Thin-Yan died in action.

==== Hanthawaddy counterattacks ====
The relatively quick fall of Khebaung shocked Razadarit. The king immediately dispatched an army led by Dein and his eldest son Binnya Dhammaraza to retake the fort. He also ordered Smin Maw-Khwin at Fort Sayat to attack Toungoo. But neither attack was successful. Maw-Khwin's foray into Toungoo was quickly stopped at the border by Thinkhaya; Maw-Khwin was captured, and his deputy Saw-Paik was killed. (The Razadarit Ayedawbon chronicle reports a battle at Pannin inside Hanthawaddy territory in which Hanthawaddy war boats attacked an Ava camp on the banks on the Sittaung but were sunk by concealed underwater stakes.)

The Hanthawaddy attempt to retake Khebaung never fully materialized. After observing the strong Ava defenses, the Hanthawaddy command chose instead to blockade the fort by driving stakes into the river south of the fort. They resorted to disrupting Ava supply lines along the river at Henzada (Hinthada).

==== Battle of Panko ====
Meanwhile, Minye Kyawswa advanced with his vanguard forces to Panko. However, he was forced to delay his attack due to Hanthawaddy disruption of Ava supply lines. Over the next few days, Ava forces led by Prince Thihathu and Hanthawaddy forces led by Prince Binnya Bassein fought for control of the riverine routes. Ava naval squadrons suffered great losses, including a squadron commander, the lord of Mindon. Eventually sufficient troops and supplies reached the Ava frontlines, allowing Minye Kyawswa to launch a joint land and naval attack on the fort. Panko's flotilla defended the port until its commander Smin Bayan (né Upakaung) was captured. The fort fell shortly after.

==== Sieges of Bassein and Myaungmya ====
"... My sovereign lord grants unto me 70,000 bronze kyats (ticals) of from the annual revenues of Bassein, and a further 30,000 bronze kyats from the revenues of Samyindon, totaling 100,000 bronze kyats. I harbor a profound doubt that your own master could equal such a stipend."

— Dein's written response to Minye Kyawswa's letter to defect for "riches".

Ava forces fanned out to Bassein and Myaungmya. However, the invaders were already at reduced strength, following substantial casualties. After inspecting Bassein's formidable defenses, Minye Kyawswa remarked that taking it would be far more costly than Khebaung. He sent a letter to Governor Dein of Bassein, offering him riches to defect to the Ava side but Dein flatly refused the overture.

Minye Kyawswa decided to personally request more support from his father. He left for Ava with the captured Hanthawaddy commanders, including Smin Bayan, arriving 17 days later. He argued that they should open the Pegu front while maintaining the sieges. Minkhaung refused to authorize any more troops, citing the need to reserve forces for the northern front. After a one-week stay, the crown prince returned empty-handed, arriving five days later near Dala.

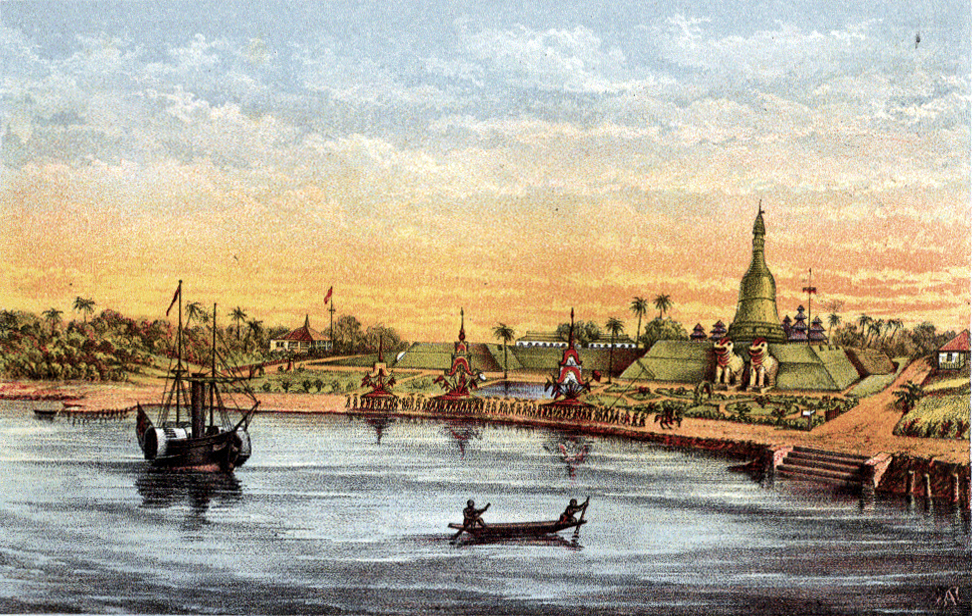
A 19th-century painting of Bassein's shoreline

Meanwhile, the Hanthawaddy command too had reassessed the situation. Shortly after Minye Kyawswa left for Ava, c. late October/early November 1414, (Note: Tazaungmon 776 ME (13 October 1414 to 11 November 1414)) Razadarit summoned his top advisers (including Dein who managed to slip past the porous siege) to Pegu. Their primary concern was that Minye Kyawswa might return with fresh reinforcements, potentially leading to the fall of Pegu itself. In the end, the high command decided to reinforce the defenses of Dala, Dagon, Syriam, and Pegu. More crucially, the king agreed to relocate to Martaban as a precaution. In Martaban, the king strengthened the city's defenses by mobilizing more troops, horses and elephants from all 32 districts of the province.

The decision soon proved to be a major mistake. News of Razadarit's evacuation alongside Dein's absence from Bassein had a demoralizing effect in the two delta cities under siege. Soon after Minye Kyawswa returned to the front, c. December 1414, (Note: Minye Kyawswa left for Ava in Tazaungmon 776 ME (13 October 1414 to 11 November 1414), and spent a total of 29 days before arriving back.) Bassein surrendered, and Myaungmya followed. With the entire delta under his control, Minye Kyawswa laid siege to Dala, Dagon and Syriam, the gateways to the Pegu province.

=== Chinese invasion of northern Ava ===
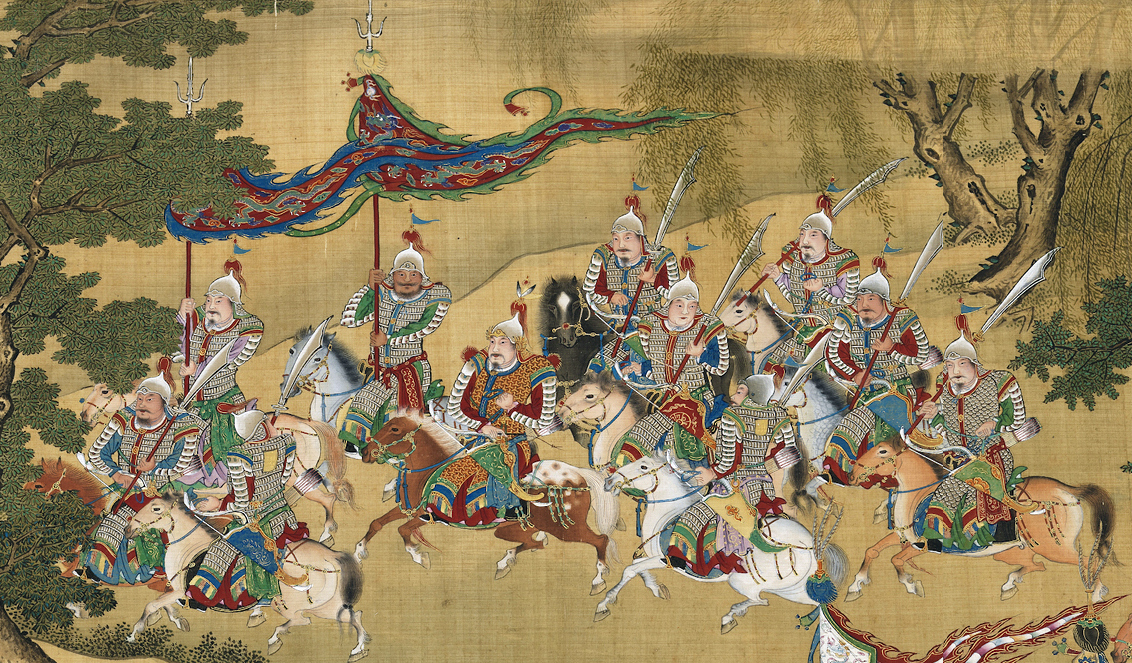
Ming cavalry

It was then that the Chinese finally opened the northern front. The two brothers of Mawdon and Mawke had enlisted a Chinese-backed army (4000 troops, 200 cavalry, 20 elephants). In response, Minkhaung sent an army to reinforce the main fort guarding the invasion route. (Note: Chronicles do not name the fort. Instead, they provide the names of the outposts outside the fort that the Chinese army had captured: Yaw-Wa (or Nga Ya-wa), Kyei-myin-daing, Taung-Bilu, Lon-daw-bauk.) The Chinese-Maw (Mong Mao) army soon arrived, and laid siege to the fort. According to the Burmese chronicles, about one month into the siege, c. January 1415, the two sides agreed to a duel on horseback between their respective champions. The chronicles continue that the Ava champion was the recently captured Hanthawaddy commander Smin Bayan, who had agreed to fight for Ava; and the Chinese army retreated after their champion lost.

=== Stalemate in the south ===
The Chinese invasion froze military activity in the south. Minye Kyawswa maintained the sieges of Dala, Dagon and Syriam but he lacked sufficient troops to capture any of the ports. After the Chinese army withdrew, he wrote to Minkhaung, requesting more troops and supplies. He argued that he could capture Pegu while Razadarit remained in Martaban. But Minkhaung, who remained concerned about the northern front, thought his son "overestimated the chances of success." He agreed only to send more supplies, and promised to open the Sittaung front.

By then, the Hanthawaddy command had assessed that Minye Kyawswa lacked the strength for a major assault. In late January or early February 1415, (Note: The main chronicles say Razadarit returned to Pegu in Tabodwe 776 ME (10 January 1415 to 7 February 1415) The Razadarit Ayedawbon says Razadarit spent "exactly three months" per astrological calculations.) Razadarit returned to Pegu, and tasked his staff with planning a counterattack to relieve the besieged forts. Since Dala in particular was starving, Razadarit dispatched Commander Emundaya to assure the town's defenders that relief was imminent, and they must hold out for a few more weeks. (Note: How Emundaya slipped in and out of Ava lines is a legendary tale still retold to date. According to the chronicles (Maha Yazawin Vol. 2 2006: 40–42), (Yazawin Thit Vol. 1 2012: 255–256), (Hmannan Vol. 2 2003: 33–35), Emundaya pretended to have defected to the Ava side near the Dala front. He then managed to get on a front line patrol before making a rush to the Dala side. He informed the Dala leadership about the upcoming help. He then left Dala by acting as a corpse tied to a raft on the river, which slipped through Ava patrols. He made it back to Pegu unharmed.)

In February, Thihathu finally opened the Sittaung front. However, his undermanned invasion force (1000 troops, 50 cavalry, 5 elephants) failed to even capture the small garrison at Fort Sayat. The Hanthawaddy command quickly determined that the incursion was merely a feint, and proceeded to finalize their plan to attack Minye Kyawswa on 22 February 1415. (Note: Full moon of Tabaung 776 ME (22 February 1415))

=== Battle of Dala ===
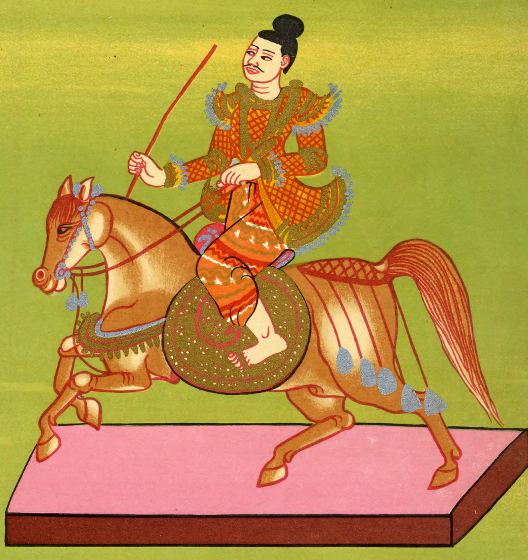
Minye Kyawswa is sometimes associated with Min Kyawzwa nat.

The Hanthawaddy counterattack began on 2 March 1415, (Note: 8th waning of Tabaung 776 ME (2 March 1415)) led by Razadarit himself. The Ava command was taken by surprise. Minye Kyawswa learned of the Hanthawaddy army's advance only when it was already near Dala. He ordered his undermanned troops at Dala to withdraw, ending the siege. At Dala, the Hanthawaddy command planned a final showdown with Minye Kyawswa. They assessed that he could be lured into fighting in an open battle where their numerical superiority would be decisive. They selected the astrologically chosen date of Wednesday, 13 March 1415 for the battle.

As expected, Minye Kyawswa also sought an open battle. Upon learning the Hanthawaddy army had come out of Dala on 13 March 1415, he prepared to attack. His senior staff was cautious: Yazathingyan advised against engagement, without better intelligence regarding the enemy's strength. Nawrahta and Tuyin Theinzi supported the assessment. However, Minye Kyawswa dismissed the advice, convinced that a victory in an open battle against Razadarit would lead to the capture of Pegu.

Minye Kyawswa's army (4 regiments, 2500+ troops, 250+ cavalry, 16+ elephants) marched to engage the larger Hanthawaddy force (7 regiments, 6000+ troops). Leading the charge on his favorite war elephant, the crown prince successfully broke through three vanguard Hanthawaddy regiments. However, he was mortally wounded while fighting General Awa Naing's regiment. Two other commanders Thettawshay and Nanda Thuriya, who had accompanied the charge, also fell. The 24-year-old crown prince was captured and died shortly thereafter. Razadarit honored his adversary by granting him a burial with full royal honors and rites.

=== Aftermath ===
Ava forces, now commanded by Nawrahta and Prince Min Nyo of Kale, withdrew in good order. Over the next few days, all remaining Ava garrisons evacuated the delta. Razadarit appointed new governors: Smin Awa Naing at Bassein, Smin Sam Lek at Myaungmya and Prince Binnya Dala at Dala, and Binnya Set at Dagon.

Ava forces returned a few weeks later. Upon receiving the news of his son's death (mid-afternoon of 14 March 1415), (Note: "နေ့ သုံးချက်တီး" Burmese daytime 3 o'clock which equates to the midway point between noon and sunset.) a distraught Minkhaung ordered an immediate invasion. He personally led a sizable naval force to the outskirts of Dala where Minye Kyawswa's remains were buried. Hanthawaddy forces did not interfere. Minkhaung exhumed his son's remains, which were later solemnly dropped into the waters near Twante. Minkhaung then marched towards Bassein, where Awa Naing, whose forces caused his son's death, was posted. After seeing Bassein was heavily fortified, Minkhaung withdrew three days later.

== Second Hanthawaddy invasion of Ava (1416) ==
After his son's death, Minkhaung was "heartbroken". He did not launch another campaign in the following dry season. Nevertheless, Hanthawaddy defenses remained vigilant. By c. April 1416, when they were certain Ava would not invade, Razadarit sent a 7000-strong army led by his eldest son, Prince Binnya Dhammaraza, via the Sittaung to probe Toungoo's defenses. Around the same time, Hanthawaddy allies, Arakanese forces, attacked and drove out the last remaining Ava garrison at Nga-khway-thin-daung.

The Hanthawaddy army's foray ended quickly. They managed to advance close to Toungoo but were driven back by an Ava army (8000 troops, of 400 cavalry, 30 elephants) led by Prince Thihathu. Over Hanthawaddy 300 Hanthawaddy troops were killed, and another 300 men alongside several dozen horses and elephants were captured. The rest fled in disarray.

The successful defense of Toungoo cemented Thihathu's emergence as Minkhaung's heir apparent. When Thihathu returned to Ava, Minkhaung formally appointed him crown prince, and married him to Saw Min Hla, Minye Kyawswa's widow.

== Sixth Ava invasion of Hanthawaddy (1417–1418) ==
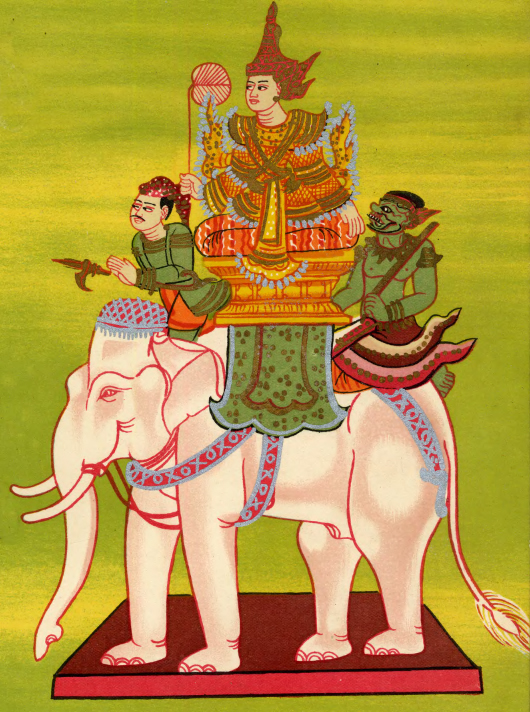
Thihathu depicted as the Aung Pinle Hsinbyushin nat (spirit)

=== Preparations ===
Thihathu's first invasion as crown prince came over a year later. The campaign's objective was explicitly retaliatory. Minkhaung authorized only a limited joint land-naval force, consisting of seven regiments (7000 troops, 700 cavalry, 40 elephants), and seven flotillas (9000 troops, 3 large war boats, 40 war boats, 50 ironclad transport boats, 70 cargo boats). (Note: Maha Yazawin, Yazawin Thit and Hmannan: Army: 7 regiments (70,000 troops, 7000 cavalry, 400 elephants); Navy: 7 flotillas (9000 troops, 30 large war boats, 400 war boats, 500 ironclad transport hlawga boats, 700 cargo boats)) The Ava battle plan, drafted by Nawrahta of Salin, focused solely on attacking the delta towns, and excluded any grandiose plans to march on Pegu.

=== Invasion ===
The invasion began in late 1417. Thihathu's navy sailed down the Irrawaddy while Nawrahta's army crossed the border from Tharrawaddy. As Hanthawaddy forces remained inside the walls, Ava forces advanced through the delta relatively unscathed, and converged on the heavily fortified towns of Dala, Dagon and Syriam. Hanthawaddy defenses were commanded by Prince Binnya Dala at Dala, Prince Binnya Set at Dagon, and Smin Awa Naing at Syriam.

The Ava advance came to a halt. Their repeated attempts to take the forts failed although they finally broke through at Dagon, capturing Prince Binnya Set. However, they made no further progress, and the sieges of Dala and Syriam continued well into 1418. Then as the rainy season approached, c. May 1418, Prince Min Nyo of Kale's regiment captured the nearby fort of Hmawbi. This prompted Thihathu to hold out for the entire rainy season.

=== Withdrawal ===
Ava forces benefited from Razadarit's policy of unofficial ceasefire. The Hanthawaddy king ordered no counterattacks during the rains. Nor did he attack when Ava forces finally withdrew after the rainy season. He permitted his son Prince Binnya Set to be taken to Ava.

In Ava, Binnya Set was treated honorably, befitting a prince. To Minkhaung, holding the prince served as repayment for the death of Minye Kyawswa. Minkhaung considered he and Razadarit to be "even", and declared that the decades-long war with Hanthawaddy had ended.

== Aftermath ==
Although the war ended without a formal peace treaty, the peace held until after both kings died in 1421. Minkhaung spent his final years focusing on domestic affairs, and performing acts of merit. He made no further attempts to recover Arakan, or launch any other campaigns. Ava's northern front remained quiet as Ming China was deeply entrenched in their war against Dai Viet. Chinese-backed campaigns into Ava territory stopped after 1415. Ava and Hsenwi signed a peace treaty in 1418/19. (Note: Fighting may have stopped as early as 1416. Per (Sai Kam Mong 2004: 28) and (Luang Tha Aye 1974: 85), the sawbwa of Hsenwi surrendered to Ava in 1416 [778 ME (1416/17)], after eight years of war with Ava. However, the Hsenwi Yazawin says Hsenwi signed a peace treaty with Ava only in 780 ME (1418/19).)

"My sweet enemy is dead. I will fight no more but spend my declining years in piety."

— Razadarit after learning the news of Minkhaung's death

For his part, Razadarit, having achieved his strategic goal of checking Ava's expansion, did not provoke further conflict. Even after Minkhaung died c. October 1421, he refused his court's suggestion to renew the war, choosing instead to mourn his rival's death. Razadarit himself died suddenly in an accident two months later.

The peace ended abruptly shortly thereafter. While Thihathu succeeded without incident at Ava, the succession at Pegu was not orderly. Because Razadarit had not named an heir, three of his sons—Binnya Dhammaraza, Binnya Ran and Binnya Kyan—immediately began a struggle for the throne. Prince Binnya Kyan sought Thihathu's help. Thihathu agreed to intervene, starting the Ava–Hanthawaddy War (1422–1423).

== Historiography ==
The war is covered extensively in several royal chronicles. The Razadarit Ayedawbon (c. 1560) is the earliest extant chronicle that reports on the war, and its coverage is from the perspective of Hanthawaddy Pegu. (Note: See (Aung-Thwin 2017: 250–253) and (Fernquest Spring 2006: 3–9) for the authors' use of the Razadarit Ayedawbon to provide coverage from Pegu's perspective.) The chronicle Maha Yazawin (1724) is the first chronicle that covers the war from Ava's perspective. (Note: See (Aung-Thwin 2017): "U Kala's perspective, from Upper Myanmar...", and (Fernquest Spring 2006): "the Burmese chronicle, which adds detail from Ava's Upper Burma perspective". U Kala's Mahayazawingyi, one of the first and most complete versions of the Burmese historical chronicle, will be used here (U Kala, 1961).") The Rakhine Razawin Thit (1931) covers from Launggyet's perspective. (Note: See (Rakhine Razawin Thit Vol. 2 1999: 9–10).)

While the general narratives of the war's events are similar across the chronicles, they contain important differences in chronology and specific details.

=== Prelude to war ===
One notable chronological discrepancy is Ava's conquest of Arakan. The main royal chronicles—the Maha Yazawin, Yazawin Thit, Hmannan Yazawin—state that Ava conquered Arakan in 765 ME (1403/04). However, the Rakhine Razawin Thit provides a later, specific date for the fall of Launggyet: Monday, 5th waning of Nadaw 768 ME (Monday, 29 November 1406). Thus 765 ME is likely a copying error of 768 ME. (Note: The Burmese numerals for 5 (၅) and 8 (၈) are visually similar and prone to miscopying)

Event	Razadarit Ayedawbon; (c. 1560)	Maha Yazawin; (1724)	Yazawin Thit; (1798)	Hmannan Yazawin; (1832)	Rakhine Razawin Thit; (1931)
Ava conquest of Arakan	no explicit dates mentioned (Note: Pan Hla's edition of the Razadarit does not provide any specific dates for the events. It covers Theiddat's defection before Ava's conquest of Arakan.)	1403/04 (Note: 765 ME (30 March 1403 – 28 March 1404))	1403/04 (Note: 765 ME (30 March 1403 – 28 March 1404))	1403/04 (Note: 765 ME (30 March 1403 – 28 March 1404))	29 November 1406 (Note: Monday, 5th waning of Nadaw 768 ME (Monday, 29 November 1406))
Theiddat's defection and Lapse of the Treaty of Kawliya	no explicit dates mentioned	c. mid 1407 (Note: early 769 ME)	c. mid 1407 (Note: early 769 ME)	no date mentioned [after 1406/07 implied] (Note: Unlike other chronicles, the Hmannan does not explicitly state any dates of the events. Its previous explicitly stated date right before this section was 768 ME (1406/07).)	not mentioned

=== Phase 1 (1408–1410) ===
The Rakhine Razawin Thit is the only chronicle that mentions a counter invasion by Ava into Arakan in 1408–1409.

Event	Razadarit Ayedawbon; (c. 1560)	Maha Yazawin; (1724)	Yazawin Thit; (1798)	Hmannan Yazawin; (1832)	Rakhine Razawin Thit; (1931)
Hanthawaddy invasion of Arakan	March 1408 (Note: Different versions of the Razadarit Ayedawbon provide different information: An 18th century copy of the Razadarit, cited in the Yazawin Thit chronicle (1798), says Razadarit decided to attack Arakan in Tabodwe 769 ME (28 December 1407–25 January 1408), and sent in his invasion forces in [Late] Tagu 769 ME (25 February 1408–24 March 1408).; Pan Hla's version of the Razadarit gives no dates or years for Hanthawaddy's first Arakan campaign. However, Pan Hla notes a few pages later in a footnote that the chronicle gives 769 ME (1407/08) for Hanthawaddy's second Arakan campaign, which according to other chronicles (including the Pak Lat) took place in 772 ME (1410/11).)	by March 1408 (Note: The Maha Yazawin only says Hanthawaddy forces invaded Arakan in 769 ME (30 March 1407–28 March 1408), which provoked Minkhaung to launch an invasion in Kason 770 ME (29 March 1408–23 April 1408).)	March 1408	no date mentioned (Note: The Hmannan includes no explicit dates about the Arakan campaign itself, except that Minkhaung invaded Hanthwaddy soon after in Kason 769 ME [sic] (6 April–5 May 1407).)	late 1407 or early 1408 (Note: 769 ME (30 March 1407 – 28 March 1408), a year after Minye Kyawswa's conquest [in November 1406]. Ava retained a toehold in Arakan at the Nga-khway-thin-daung fort in 770 ME (1408/09).)
1st Ava invasion of Hanthawaddy	[1408 implied] (Note: right after the Arakan campaign)	April–August 1408 (Note: Invasion begins in Kason 770 ME (29 March 1408–23 April 1408). Negotiations began about three months later but eventually broke down; Ava forces were driven back soon after.)	April–August 1408 (Note: The Yazawin Thit largely follows the Maha Yazawin's narrative but does not explicitly state Kason 770 ME (29 March 1408–23 April 1408). Instead it says Minkhaung launched the invasion right after learning about the fall of Arakan.)	April–August 1407 [sic] (Note: The Hmannan follows the Maha Yazawin's narrative but it gives 769 ME as the year (instead of 770 ME). This means the invasion began in Kason 769 ME (6 April 1407–5 May 1407), the attempts to negotiate began about three months into the campaign (July/August 1408), and Ava forces were driven back soon after.)	not mentioned
Ava invasion of Arakan	not mentioned	not mentioned	not mentioned	not mentioned	late 1408 (or early 1409)
2nd Ava invasion of Hanthawaddy	~5 months in 1409–1410 (Note: Campaign lasted about five months during the dry season of 771 ME, and ended before the arrival of the rainy season. Unlike the main chronicles, the Razadarit does not explicitly say that the campaign ended in 771 ME.)	by October 1409–March 1410 (Note: Campaign lasted about five months during the dry season of 771 ME, and ended in 771 ME.)	by October 1409–March 1410 (Note: Campaign lasted about five months during the dry season of 771 ME, and ended in 771 ME.)	by October 1409–March 1410 (Note: Campaign lasted about five months during the dry season of 771 ME, and ended in 771 ME.)	not mentioned

=== Phase 2 (1410–1415) ===
The royal chronicles present varying accounts of Minye Kyawswa's campaigns, both in the sequencing of events and, most critically, in the date of his death. The Razadarit Ayedawbon records only two invasions by Minye Kyawswa whereas the main chronicles list three. Furthermore, many of the Maha Yazawin's dates for this phase of the war are inconsistent with its own narrative. (Note: The Maha Yazawin's narrative has the following inconsistencies: The Arakan campaign started in late 772 ME (early 1411), fought into early 773 ME (c. April 1412 onwards), and ended in 772 ME [sic] (1410/11). (Note: The Maha Yazawin is inconsistent: In response to Ava's invasion of Arakan, Hanthawaddy sent reinforcements to Arakan in early 773 ME (c. April 1411). After over three months of fighting at Sandoway, Ava forces withdrew.; Hanthawaddy forces then went on to retake Launggyet in 772 ME [sic] (1410/11).); Its dates suggest a three-year lull in fighting between 774 ME and 777 ME even though its own narrative shows continuous fighting.; Its dates for the fifth invasion 777 ME (1415–1416) and 778 ME (1416–1417) are inconsistent with its narrative of single dry season campaign.; Its date for the Battle of Dala (Wednesday, 4th waxing of Tagu 778 ME) translates to Sunday, 21 March 1417.)

The most notable discrepancy across the chronicles is the date of Minye Kyawswa's death. The Razadarit says Minye Kyawswa died in [Late] Tagu 775 ME (March 1414), (Note: Inconsistent date: According to Pan Hla, The Binnya Dala version of the Razadarit gives Wednesday, 4th waxing of [Late] Tagu 775 ME. which translates to Saturday, 24 March 1414.; The Pak Lat gives "Sunday, 4th waxing of Tagu" without the year. Pan Hla continues that because Pak Lat says Minye Kyawswa dies three years after his first campaign in 772 ME, the year of the death should be 775 ME. Sunday, 4th waxing of [Late] Tagu 775 ME translates to Saturday, 24 March 1414.) while the Maha Yazawin places it in [Late] Tagu 778 ME (March 1417), (Note: Inconsistent date: Wednesday, 4th waxing of [Late] Tagu 778 ME (Sunday, 21 March 1417)) likely a copying error of 775 ME. The Yazawin Thit changes it to [Late] Tagu 776 ME (March 1415). (Note: Consistent date: Wednesday, 4th waxing of [Late] Tagu 776 ME (Wednesday, 13 March 1415)) The Hmannan Yazawin accepts the Yazawin Thit's dates from 772 ME (1410/11) onwards except for the battle of Dala. (Note: Inconsistent date: Wednesday, 4th waxing of [Late] Tagu 778 ME (Sunday, 21 March 1417))

Event	Razadarit Ayedawbon; (c. 1560)	Maha Yazawin; (1724)	Yazawin Thit; (1798)	Hmannan Yazawin; (1832)	Rakhine Razawin Thit; (1931)
3rd Ava invasion of Hanthawaddy	late 1410	[late 1410 implied] (Note: The Maha Yazawin does not provide a specific date for this campaign. But the previous campaign took place in 771 ME and the subsequent campaign in 773 ME.)	late 1410 (Note: Dry season of 772 ME)	late 1410 (Note: Dry season of 772 ME)	not mentioned
Battle of Arakan	by early 1411–? (Note: Began after Minye Kyawswa's withdrawal from the delta; no specific end date given.)	by early 1411–1410/11 [sic]	by early 1411–c. April 1412 (Note: Ava forces invaded Arakan in late 772 ME (early 1411), and Hanthawaddy reinforcements came in 773 ME (c. April/May 1411). Battle of Sandoway in 773 ME (mid 1411–late 1411); Battle of Launggyet in late 773 ME (early 1412).)	by early 1411–early 1412 (Note: Ava forces conquered Launggyet and Sandoway in late 772 ME (early 1411) before Hanthawaddy reinforcements arrived in early 773 ME. Battle of Sandoway in 773 ME (mid 1411–late 1411); Battle of Launggyet in late 773 ME (early 1412).)	1411/12
1st Chinese/Hsenwi invasion of Ava (Siege of Hsenwi)	6+ months in 1411/12 (Note: 6+ months in 773 ME (30 March 1411–28 March 1412))	c. April 1411–November 1411 (Note: Hsenwi forces invaded Ava in early 773 ME (c. April 1411). Minye Kyawswa laid siege to Hsenwi for about five months before defeating Chinese relief forces..)	c. April 1412–? (Note: The Yazawin Thit only says the campaign took place in 774 ME (29 March 1412–29 March 1413).)	c. April 1412–November 1412 (Note: Hsenwi campaign began in early 774 ME (c. April 1411), laid siege to Hsenwi for about five months before defeating Chinese relief forces.)	not mentioned
1st Hanthawaddy invasion of Ava (Siege of Prome & Battle of Talezi)	~6 months in 1411/12 (Siege of Prome) (Note: The siege of Prome lasted about six months in 773 ME (30 March 1411–28 March 1412): 1.5 months by Razadarit; another 2 to 3 months by Binnya Bassein; and another month.)	1411/12 (Note: The Maha Yazawin does not provide a specific date for the campaign.)	5 months in 1412/13 (Note: The siege of Prome began a month after the Ava victory over the Chinese in 774 ME (1412/13) and lasted about a month. The siege of Talezi lasted about four months.)	c. November 1412–December 1412 (Note: The siege of Prome began a month after the Ava victory over the Chinese in 774 ME (1412/13) and lasted about a month. The siege of Talezi lasted about four months.)	not mentioned
Siamese invasion of Martaban	4 months in 1411/12 (Note: About one and a half months into the Prome campaign in 773 ME (30 March 1411–28 March 1412), Razadarit left for Martaban to drive out the Siamese; the campaign lasted four months.)	1411/12 (Note: Siamese forces attacked Ye, one month into the Prome campaign.)	4 months in 1412/13 (Note: Siamese forces attacked Moulmein and Martaban, one month into the Prome campaign. The Ava siege of Talezi lasted about four months before Razadarit returned.)	c. December 1412–March 1413 (Note: Siamese forces attacked Ye, one month into the Prome campaign. The Ava siege of Talezi lasted about four months before Razadarit returned.)	not mentioned
4th Ava invasion of Hanthawaddy	not mentioned	rainy season [of 1412] (Note: The campaign began after the siege of Prome was lifted, and ended after the rainy season. The chronicle does not specifically state the year for the campaign but the events following the campaign were in 774 ME (1412/13).)	c. April 1413–c. October 1413 (Note: The campaign lasted into Nayon [775 ME] (30 April 1413–28 May 1413) before withdrawing after the rainy season of 775 ME.)	c. April 1413–c. October 1413 (Note: The campaign began after Minye Kyawswa had returned from Hsenwi and lasted into Nayon [775 ME] (30 April 1413–28 May 1413) before withdrawing after the rainy season.)	not mentioned
2nd Chinese/Maw invasion of Ava (Battle of Myedu)	not mentioned	late 1412 (Note: 774 ME (29 March 1412–29 March 1413))	late 1413 (Note: after rainy season of 775 ME)	late 1413 (Note: after rainy season of 775 ME)	not mentioned
Ava garrison posted in Arakan	not mentioned	not mentioned	not mentioned	not mentioned	1413/14
5th Ava invasion of Hanthawaddy	late 1413–after March 1414 (Note: The campaign was fought in 775 ME (1413/14), and ended soon after Minye Kyawswa's death in March 1414.)	by October 1415–May 1417 (Note: The Maha Yazawin says the campaign had begun by Tazaungmon 777 ME (2–31 October 1415), and ended after Minye Kyawswa's death on 4th waxing of Late Tagu 778 ME (1417).)	by October 1414–May 1415 (Note: The invasion had begun by Tazaungmon 776 ME (13 October 1413–11 November 1413), and ended after Minkhaung withdrew in early 777 ME (April/May 1415).)	by October 1414–May 1417 (Note: The invasion had begun by Tazaungmon 776 ME (13 October 1413–11 November 1413), and ended after Minkhaung withdrew in early 779 ME (April/May 1417).)	not mentioned
· Battle of Dala	Saturday, 24 March 1414	Sunday, 21 March 1417	Wednesday, 13 March 1415	Sunday, 21 March 1417	not mentioned
3rd Maw/Chinese invasion of Ava	after March 1414 (Note: The Razadarit Ayedawbon places the Chinese invasion of Ava after Minye Kyawswa's death.)	late 1415–January 1416 (Note: The Chinese laid siege to Ava between Tazaungmon 777 ME (2 October 1415–31 October 1415) and Tabodwe 776 ME (30 December 1415–27 January 1416) for a month.)	late 1414–January 1415 (Note: The Chinese invasion took place between Tazaungmon 776 ME (13 October 1414–11 November 1414) and Tabodwe 776 ME (10 January 1415–7 February 1415).)	late 1414–January 1415 (Note: The Chinese invasion took place between Tazaungmon 776 ME (13 October 1414–11 November 1414) and Tabodwe 777 ME (10 January 1415–7 February 1415).)	not mentioned

=== Phase 3 (1416–1418) ===
The Hmannan is inconsistent: after placing Minye Kyawswa's death in March 1417, the chronicle records the start of the next military campaign in 1416. (Note: Hanthawaddy forces attacked Toungoo in 778 ME (1416/17).) The Rakhine Razawin Thit is the only chronicle that mentions the battle of Nga-khway-thin-daung in 1416/17.

Event	Razadarit Ayedawbon; (c. 1560)	Maha Yazawin; (1724)	Yazawin Thit; (1798)	Hmannan Yazawin; (1832)	Rakhine Razawin Thit; (1931)
2nd Hanthawaddy invasion of Ava (Battle of Toungoo)	not mentioned	1417/18 (Note: Hanthawaddy forces attacked Toungoo in 779 ME (1417/18).)	1416/17 (Note: Hanthawaddy forces attacked Toungoo in 778 ME (1416/17).)	1416/17	not mentioned
Ava driven out of Arakan (Battle of Nga-khway-thin-daung)	not mentioned	not mentioned	not mentioned	not mentioned	1416/17
6th Ava invasion of Hanthawaddy	specific date not mentioned but after March 1414 (Note: The Razadarit Ayedawbon places the invasion in which Binnya Set of Dagon was captured, right after Minye Kyawswa's death in 1414.)	late 1418–late 1419 (Note: Invasion began in 780 ME (1418/19), and ended sometime after the next rainy season.)	late 1417–late 1418 (Note: Invasion began in 779 ME (1417/18), and ended after the next rainy season.)	late 1417–late 1418 (Note: Invasion began in 779 ME (1417/18), and ended after the next rainy season.)	not mentioned

== Bibliography ==
- Aung-Thwin, Michael A. (2017). Myanmar in the Fifteenth Century. Honolulu: University of Hawai'i Press. ISBN 978-0-8248-6783-6.
- Fernquest, Jon (Spring 2006). "Rajadhirat's Mask of Command: Military Leadership in Burma (c. 1384–1421)" (PDF). SOAS Bulletin of Burma Research. 4 (1). Archived (PDF) from the original on 2020-03-22.
- Fernquest, Jon (Autumn 2006). "Crucible of War: Burma and the Ming in the Tai Frontier Zone (1382–1454)" (PDF). SOAS Bulletin of Burma Research. 4 (2). Archived (PDF) from the original on 2017-08-10.
- Goh, Geok Yian (2009). Connecting and Distancing: Southeast Asia and China. Institute of Southeast Asian. ISBN 9789812308566.
- Harvey, G. E. (1925). History of Burma: From the Earliest Times to 10 March 1824. London: Frank Cass & Co. Ltd.
- Hlaing, Mi Mi (2018). "States of Hostilities in the First Ava Period". Mandalay University Research Journal. 9 (1). University of Mandalay.
- Htin Aung, Maung (1967). A History of Burma. New York and London: Cambridge University Press.
- Kala, U (2006) [1724]. Maha Yazawin (in Burmese). Vol. 1–3 (4th printing ed.). Yangon: Ya-Pyei Publishing.
- Maha Sithu (2012) [1798]. Myint Swe; Kyaw Win; Thein Hlaing (eds.). Yazawin Thit (in Burmese). Vol. 1–3 (2nd printing ed.). Yangon: Ya-Pyei Publishing.
- Pan Hla, Nai (2005) [1968]. Razadarit Ayedawbon (in Burmese) (8th printing ed.). Yangon: Armanthit Sarpay.
- Phayre, Arthur P. (1967) [1883]. History of Burma. London: Susil Gupta.
- Royal Historical Commission of Burma (2003) [1832]. Hmannan Yazawin (in Burmese). Vol. 1–3. Yangon: Ministry of Information, Myanmar.
- Sandamala Linkara, Ashin (1997–1999) [1931]. Rakhine Razawin Thit (in Burmese). Vol. 1–2. Yangon: Tetlan Sarpay.
- Scott, James George; Hardiman, John Percy (1899). Gazetteer of Upper Burma and the Shan States. Vol. 1. Rangoon: Government Printing, Burma.
- "Hsenwi State Chronicle". The Guardian (Burma). Translated by James George Scott. Rangoon. January–March 1967 [1897].
