= Nanda Kyawthu of Kinda =

Nanda Kyawthu
- နန္ဒ ကျော်သူ

Governor of Kinda
- In office c. November 1414 – ?
- Monarch: Minkhaung I
- Preceded by: ?
- Succeeded by: ?

Personal details
- Born: Ava Kingdom

Military service
- Allegiance: Ava Kingdom
- Branch/service: Royal Ava Army
- Years of service: 1400s–1410s
- Rank: Commander
- Unit: Left Flank Regiment
- Battles/wars: Ava–Hanthawaddy War (1408–1418)

Nanda Kyawthu (Burmese: နန္ဒ ကျော်သူ, pronounced [nàɴda̰ dʑɔ̀ðù]; formerly, Nanda Yawda, နန္ဒ ယောဓာ) was an early 15th century commander in the Royal Ava Army. He was the long-serving commander of the Left Flank Regiment in the elite Royal Main Army (the Tatmadaw) of King Minkhaung I. This role earned him the moniker "Letwe" (လက်ဝဲ, lit. "left hand-side"), and he was known as Letwe Nanda Yawda (လက်ဝဲ နန္ဒ ယောဓာ) or simply Letwe Yawda (လက်ဝဲ ယောဓာ).

He participated in the Ava–Hanthawaddy War (1408–1418). Following his distinguished performance in the Battle of Panko in 1414, he received the upgraded title of Nanda Kyawthu, and was appointed governor of Kinda c. November 1414. (Note: In November 1414, during a lull in the war, he and his fellow commander Sittuyingathu accompanied Crown Prince Minye Kyawswa to Ava (Inwa) where they were honored by the king. Yawda received Kinda in fief and the title of Nanda Kyawthu while Sittuyingathu received Sale in fief and the upgraded title of Nanda Thuriya.)

== Military service ==
The following is a list of military campaigns in which the names Letwe [Nanda] Yawda (1408–1414) and Nanda Kyawthu (from November 1414) are explicitly mentioned in the royal chronicles. (Note: While he presumably participated in other actions during the Ava–Hanthawaddy War (1408–1418)—such as the 1409–1410 invasion—the chronicles do not provide the names of the commanders in Minkhaung's Royal Main Army for those campaigns.)

Campaign	Duration	Troops commanded (Note: Chronicle reported troop levels reduced by an order of magnitude per (Harvey 1925: 333–336))	Notes
Ava invasion of Hanthawaddy	April–August 1408	1000 troops	Commanded the Left Flank Regiment in Minkhaung's Royal Main Army
Battle of Panko	October 1414	1 naval squadron	Defended Khebaung against Hanthawaddy counterattacks. Led the naval attack on Fort Panko; captured Hanthawaddy commander Paik-Thin-Yan.

== Bibliography ==
- Fernquest, Jon (Spring 2006). "Rajadhirat's Mask of Command: Military Leadership in Burma (c. 1384–1421)" (PDF). SOAS Bulletin of Burma Research. 4 (1). Archived (PDF) from the original on 2020-03-22.
- Harvey, G. E. (1925). History of Burma: From the Earliest Times to 10 March 1824. London: Frank Cass & Co. Ltd.
- Kala, U (2006) [1724]. Maha Yazawin (in Burmese). Vol. 1–3 (4th printing ed.). Yangon: Ya-Pyei Publishing.
- Maha Sithu (2012) [1798]. Myint Swe; Kyaw Win; Thein Hlaing (eds.). Yazawin Thit (in Burmese). Vol. 1–3 (2nd printing ed.). Yangon: Ya-Pyei Publishing.
- Royal Historical Commission of Burma (2003) [1832]. Hmannan Yazawin (in Burmese). Vol. 1–3. Yangon: Ministry of Information, Myanmar.
