= Nanda Thuriya of Sale =

Nanda Thuriya
- နန္ဒ သူရိယ

Governor of Sale
- In office c. November 1414 – 13 March 1415
- Monarch: Minkhaung I
- Preceded by: ?
- Succeeded by: ?

Personal details
- Born: c. 1390s Pyinzi? Ava Kingdom
- Died: 13 March 1415 Dala–Twante; Hanthawaddy kingdom

Military service
- Allegiance: Ava Kingdom
- Branch/service: Royal Ava Army
- Years of service: by 1407–1415
- Rank: Commander
- Battles/wars: Ava–Hanthawaddy War (1408–1418)

Nanda Thuriya (Burmese: နန္ဒ သူရိယ, pronounced [nàɴda̰ θùɹḭja̰]; formerly Sittuyingathu (စစ်တုရင်္ကသူ), [sɪʔ tṵ jìɰ̃ gə ðù]; d. 13 March 1415) was a Royal Ava Army commander, and the governor of Sale (Salay) for a few months before his death. He was a member of Crown Prince Minye Kyawswa's inner circle, and fought alongside the prince throughout the Ava–Hanthawaddy War (1408–1418). Both commanders died in action on 13 March 1415 at the Battle of Dala, having fought the enemy while riding the same war elephant.

== Biography ==
Nanda Thuriya served Prince Minye Kyawswa from their childhood. He was the son of a household staff member who cared for the young prince in Pyinzi. When the prince's father Minkhaung became king of Ava in 1400, Nanda Thuriya and his family followed the king to the royal capital Ava (Inwa). By 1407, he had joined the Royal Household Guards, and received the title of Sittuyingathu (Pali: Caturangasura). That year, he was part of Minkhaung's security detail when the king confronted his younger brother Prince Theiddat.

Sittuyingathu is first mentioned as a Royal Army officer in the royal chronicles in 1408. At the start of the third war with Hanthawaddy, he commanded one of the four regiments that protected the Ava capital region, serving under the command of Crown Prince Minye Kyawswa. In the following years, he accompanied the crown prince in several campaigns, often sharing the same war elephant. During the Battle of Khebaung in October 1414, he served as sitke (deputy commander-in-chief), and led the charge on the enemy walls alongside the crown prince.

For his distinguished performance at Khebaung, Sittuyingathu was appointed governor of Sale (Salay). In November 1414, during a lull in the war, he and his fellow commander Letwe Yawda accompanied the crown prince to Ava where they were honored by the king. Sittuyingathu received Sale in fief and the upgraded title of Nanda Thuriya; Yawda received Kinda in fief and the title of Nanda Kyawthu.

His tenure as governor was brief. He returned to the front with the crown prince in December 1414 and never visited his fief. He died in action at the Battle of Dala on 13 March 1415. At the time of his death, he occupied the middle position on the war elephant, between the mahout and the crown prince. He was killed instantly, while the crown prince was mortally wounded and died later that day.

== Military service ==
The following is a list of military campaigns in which the names Sittuyingathu (1408–1414) (Note: Another officer had succeeded the title Sittuyingathu by 1417/18. That officer was assigned to guard Dagon during Ava's 1417–1418 invasion of Hanthawaddy.) and Nanda Thuriya (November 1414–March 1415) (Note: A previous commander with the title Nanda Thuriya served in the army in 1408.) are explicitly mentioned in the royal chronicles.

Campaign	Duration	Troops commanded (Note: Chronicle reported troop levels reduced by an order of magnitude per (Harvey 1925: 333–336))	Notes
Ava capital region defense corps	April–August 1408	1 regiment	One of the four regiments assigned to defend the capital region
Battle of Talezi	March 1413	1 squadron	Commanded the 4th Squadron of the Ava Navy
Battle of Khebaung	October 1414	2nd in command sitke	Served as the deputy commander-in-chief of the army that captured the fort
Battle of Dala	December 1414–13 March 1415	?	Died in action

== Bibliography ==
- Harvey, G. E. (1925). History of Burma: From the Earliest Times to 10 March 1824. London: Frank Cass & Co. Ltd.
- Kala, U (2006) [1724]. Maha Yazawin (in Burmese). Vol. 1–3 (4th printing ed.). Yangon: Ya-Pyei Publishing.
- Maha Sithu (2012) [1798]. Myint Swe; Kyaw Win; Thein Hlaing (eds.). Yazawin Thit (in Burmese). Vol. 1–3 (2nd printing ed.). Yangon: Ya-Pyei Publishing.
- Pan Hla, Nai (2005) [1968]. Razadarit Ayedawbon (in Burmese) (8th printing ed.). Yangon: Armanthit Sarpay.
- Royal Historical Commission of Burma (2003) [1832]. Hmannan Yazawin (in Burmese). Vol. 1–3. Yangon: Ministry of Information, Myanmar.
