= Thettawshay of Myedu =

Thettawshay of Myedu; မြေဒူး သက်တော်ရှည်

Governor of Myedu
- Reign: by 1413 (Note: The royal chronicles offer conflicting accounts as to when Thettawshay's tenure began: The Maha Yazawin (1724) says he was appointed before the raids on Myedu by the sawbwas of Mawdon and Mawke in 774 ME (1412/13), implying an appointment in late 1412.; The Yazawin Thit (1798) omits him from the list of governorship appointments made before the raids by the sawbwas in 775 ME (1413/14), suggesting that Thettawshay was already governor prior to this event.; The Hmannan Yazawin (1832) says his appointment occurred after the rainy season ended and before the raids by the two sawbwas in 775 ME (1413/14), which places the appointment c. November 1413.) – 13 March 1415
- Predecessor: ? (Note: The only governor of Myedu previously mentioned in the chronicles is Thetshay Kyawhtin during the reign of King Swa Saw Ke (r. 1367–1400). Kyawhtin's exact tenure is not listed.)
- Successor: Ottama Thiri Zeya Nawrahta (Note: Chronicles do not say when the next governor was appointed. However, by the time of King Thihathu's accession in 1421, Ottama Thiri Zeya Nawrahta was already governor of Myedu, presenting the new king with a white elephant.)
- King: Minkhaung I
- Born: Ava Kingdom
- Died: 13 March 1415; Wednesday, 4th waxing of Late Tagu 776 ME; Dala–Twante; Hanthawaddy kingdom

Thettawshay of Myedu (Burmese: မြေဒူး သက်တော်ရှည်, Burmese pronunciation: [mjèdú θɛʔdɔ̀ʃè]; also spelled Thettawshe; lit. 'Royal Long Life') was governor of Myedu at least from the early 1410s until 1415. He participated in the Ava–Hanthawaddy War (1408–1418), and was killed in action at the battle of Dala on 13 March 1415 alongside Crown Prince Minye Kyawswa.

== Military service ==
The following is a list of campaigns in which the lord of Myedu is mentioned in the chronicles. A discrepancy exists regarding Thettawshay's tenure: If he became governor only in 1413 as the Hmannan Yazawin states, then the prior battles must have been led by his unnamed predecessor.

Campaign	Duration	Troops commanded (Note: Chronicle reported troop levels reduced by an order of magnitude per (Harvey 1925: 333–336))	Notes
Siege of Prome and Talezi	December 1412–March 1413	1 regiment (1000 troops)	Identified only as "Lord of Myedu", not as Thettawshay of Myedu
Fourth Ava invasion of Hanthawaddy	April–May 1413	1 regiment	Identified only as "Lord of Myedu"; held the Dala command, after the fort was captured
Battle of Myedu	late 1413	?	Defense of his own fief against Maw attacks
Battle of Dala	December 1414–March 1415	?	Fell in action alongside Crown Prince Minye Kyawswa

== Bibliography ==
- Aung-Thwin, Michael A. (2017). Myanmar in the Fifteenth Century. Honolulu: University of Hawai'i Press. ISBN 978-0-8248-6783-6.
- Harvey, G. E. (1925). History of Burma: From the Earliest Times to 10 March 1824. London: Frank Cass & Co. Ltd.
- Kala, U (2006) [1724]. Maha Yazawin (in Burmese). Vol. 1–3 (4th printing ed.). Yangon: Ya-Pyei Publishing.
- Maha Sithu (2012) [1798]. Myint Swe; Kyaw Win; Thein Hlaing (eds.). Yazawin Thit (in Burmese). Vol. 1–3 (2nd printing ed.). Yangon: Ya-Pyei Publishing.
- Pan Hla, Nai (2005) [1968]. Razadarit Ayedawbon (in Burmese) (8th printing ed.). Yangon: Armanthit Sarpay.
- Royal Historical Commission of Burma (2003) [1832]. Hmannan Yazawin (in Burmese). Vol. 1–3. Yangon: Ministry of Information, Myanmar.

Thettawshay of Myedu Died: 13 March 1415
Preceded by	Governor of Myedu by 1413–1415	Succeeded by Ottama Thiri Zeya Nawrahta
