= Ava–Hanthawaddy War (1416–1418) orders of battle =

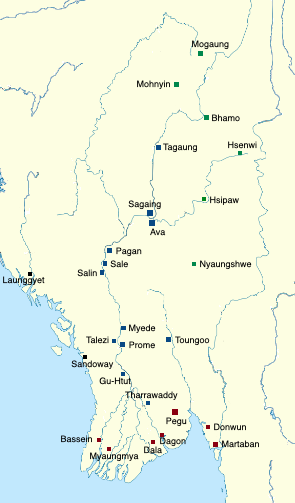
Ava and Hanthawaddy forces fought two campaigns between 1416 and 1418.

This is a list of orders of battle for the 1416–1418 campaigns of the Ava–Hanthawaddy War (1408–1418).

== Background ==
=== Sources ===
The orders of battles in this article are sourced from the main royal chronicles—the Maha Yazawin, the Yazawin Thit and the Hmannan Yazawin, which primarily narrate the war from the Ava side. (Note: See (Maha Yazawin Vol. 2 2006: 54–55), (Yazawin Thit Vol. 1 2012: 263–264), and (Hmannan Vol. 2 2003: 50–51).) The Razadarit Ayedawbon and Pak Lat Chronicles, which narrate from the Hanthawaddy perspective do not provide any details for this phase of the war. (Note: See (Fernquest 2006: 20) and (Pan Hla 2005: 318–369}.)

=== Adjustment of strength figures ===
The military strength figures in this article have been reduced by an order of magnitude from those reported in the chronicles, following G.E. Harvey's and Victor Lieberman's analyses of Burmese chronicles' military strength figures in general. (Note: See (Harvey 1925: 333–335)'s "Numerical Note". (Lieberman 2014: 98) writing on the First Toungoo period concurs: "Military mobilizations were probably more of a boast than a realistic estimate. Modern industrial states have difficulty placing 10% of their people under arms.")

== Hanthawaddy invasion (late 1416) ==
=== Battle of Toungoo (late 1416) ===
==== Hanthawaddy Pegu ====
Pegu Order of Battle, late 1416
Unit	Commander	Strength (Note: Unless otherwise stated, the military mobilization figures in this article are reduced by an order of magnitude from those reported in the royal chronicles, per G.E. Harvey's analysis in his History of Burma (1925) in the section Numerical Note (pp. 333–335).)	Reference(s)
Hanthawaddy Army	Prince Binnya Dhammaraza	7 regiments (7000 troops, 500 cavalry, 30+ elephants)	(Note: Chronicles report: Maha Yazawin: 7 regiments (70,000 troops, 1000 cavalry, 350 elephants); Yazawin Thit: 7 regiments (70,000 troops, 5000 cavalry, 300 elephants); Hmannan: 7 regiments (70,000 troops, 5000 cavalry, 350 elephants))

==== Ava ====
Ava Order of Battle, late 1416
Unit	Commander	Strength	Reference(s)
Ava Southern Division	Prince Thihathu of Prome	8 regiments (8000 troops, 400 cavalry, 30 elephants)	(Note: Maha Yazawin, Yazawin Thit and Hmannan: 8 regiments (80,000 troops, 4000 cavalry, 300 elephants))

== Ava invasion (1417–1418) ==
=== Ava ===
Ava Order of Battle, 1417–1418
Unit	Commander	Strength	Reference(s)
Main Strike Force	Prince Thihathu	16000 troops, 700 cavalry, 40 elephants, 3 large war boats, 40 war boats, 50 ironclad transport boats, 70 cargo boats	(Note: Maha Yazawin, Yazawin Thit and Hmannan: Army: 7 regiments (70,000 troops, 7000 cavalry, 400 elephants); Navy: 7 flotillas (9000 troops, 30 large war boats, 400 war boats, 500 ironclad transport hlawga boats, 700 cargo boats))
Army	Nawrahta of Salin	7 regiments (7000 troops, 700 cavalry, 40 elephants)	(Note: Maha Yazawin, Yazawin Thit and Hmannan: Army: 7 regiments (70,000 troops, 7000 cavalry, 400 elephants); Navy: 7 flotillas (9000 troops, 30 large war boats, 400 war boats, 500 ironclad transport hlawga boats, 700 cargo boats))
Navy	Thihathu	7 flotillas (9000 troops, 3 large war boats, 40 war boats, 50 ironclad transport boats, 70 cargo boats)	(Note: Maha Yazawin, Yazawin Thit and Hmannan: Army: 7 regiments (70,000 troops, 7000 cavalry, 400 elephants); Navy: 7 flotillas (9000 troops, 30 large war boats, 400 war boats, 500 ironclad transport hlawga boats, 700 cargo boats))
	Including: Min Nyo of Kale; Sittuyingathu		(Note: Maha Yazawin, Yazawin Thit and Hmannan: Army: 7 regiments (70,000 troops, 7000 cavalry, 400 elephants); Navy: 7 flotillas (9000 troops, 30 large war boats, 400 war boats, 500 ironclad transport hlawga boats, 700 cargo boats))

=== Hanthawaddy Pegu ===
Pegu Order of Battle, 1417–1418
Unit	Commander	Strength	Reference(s)
Royal Hanthawaddy Armed Forces	King Razadarit		
Dala Regiment	Prince Binnya Dala		
Dagon Regiment	Prince Binnya Set of Dagon (surrendered)		
Syriam Regiment	Smin Awa Naing		
Hmawbi Regiment	Smin Byat Za the Younger (surrendered)		
Royal Main Army at Pegu and Martaban	Razadarit		

== Bibliography ==
- Fernquest, Jon (Spring 2006). "Rajadhirat's Mask of Command: Military Leadership in Burma (c. 1384–1421)" (PDF). SOAS Bulletin of Burma Research. 4 (1). Archived (PDF) from the original on 2020-03-22.
- Fernquest, Jon (Autumn 2006). "Crucible of War: Burma and the Ming in the Tai Frontier Zone (1382–1454)" (PDF). SOAS Bulletin of Burma Research. 4 (2). Archived (PDF) from the original on 2017-08-10.
- Harvey, G. E. (1925). History of Burma: From the Earliest Times to 10 March 1824. London: Frank Cass & Co. Ltd.
- Kala, U (2006) [1724]. Maha Yazawin (in Burmese). Vol. 1–3 (4th printing ed.). Yangon: Ya-Pyei Publishing.
- Lieberman, Victor B. (2014) [1984]. Burmese Administrative Cycles: Anarchy and Conquest, c. 1580–1760. Princeton University Press. ISBN 978-0-691-05407-0.
- Maha Sithu (2012) [1798]. Myint Swe; Kyaw Win; Thein Hlaing (eds.). Yazawin Thit (in Burmese). Vol. 1–3 (2nd printing ed.). Yangon: Ya-Pyei Publishing.
- Pan Hla, Nai (2005) [1968]. Razadarit Ayedawbon (in Burmese) (8th printing ed.). Yangon: Armanthit Sarpay.
- Royal Historical Commission of Burma (2003) [1832]. Hmannan Yazawin (in Burmese). Vol. 1–3. Yangon: Ministry of Information, Myanmar.
