= Ava–Hanthawaddy War (1410–1412) orders of battle =

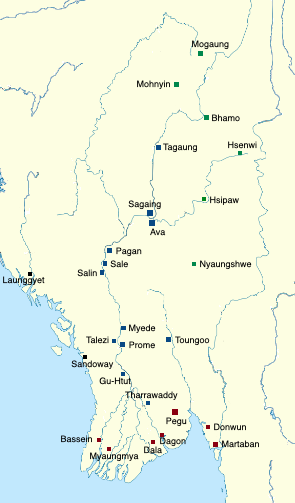
Ava and Hanthawaddy forces fought in the Irrawaddy delta in 1410–1411, and in Arakan in 1411–1412.

This is a list of orders of battle for the 1410–1412 campaigns of the Ava–Hanthawaddy War (1408–1418). Aside from the initial battles in the Irrawaddy delta in late 1410–early 1411, the rest of the battles in this phase of the war were fought in Arakan.

== Background ==
=== Sources ===
The orders of battles for Ava in this article are sourced from the main royal chronicles—the Maha Yazawin, the Yazawin Thit and the Hmannan Yazawin, which primarily narrate the war from the Ava side. (Note: See (Maha Yazawin Vol. 2 2006: 28–30), (Yazawin Thit Vol. 1 2012: 237–238), and (Hmannan Vol. 2 2003: 4–7).) The orders of battle for Hanthawaddy Pegu are mainly sourced from Nai Pan Hla's version of the Razadarit Ayedawbon, which has incorporated narratives of the Pak Lat Chronicles. (Note: See (Pan Hla 2005: 272–277).) The Rakhine Razawin Thit, which narrates from the Arakanese perspective, says almost nothing about the campaigns except that it was Min Khayi that was allied with the Hanthawaddy forces, not Min Saw Mon as reported in the main chronicles and in the Razadarit.

=== Adjustment of strength figures ===
The military strength figures in this article have been reduced by an order of magnitude from those reported in the chronicles, following G.E. Harvey's and Victor Lieberman's analyses of Burmese chronicles' military strength figures in general. (Note: See (Harvey 1925: 333–335)'s "Numerical Note". (Lieberman 2014: 98) writing on the First Toungoo period concurs: "Military mobilizations were probably more of a boast than a realistic estimate. Modern industrial states have difficulty placing 10% of their people under arms.")

== Ava invasion of the Irrawaddy delta (c. November 1410) ==
=== Ava ===
Ava Order of Battle, c. November 1410
Unit	Commander	Strength (Note: Unless otherwise stated, the military mobilization figures in this article are reduced by an order of magnitude from those reported in the royal chronicles, per G.E. Harvey's analysis in his History of Burma (1925) in the section Numerical Note (pp. 333–335).)	Reference(s)
Royal Ava Armed Forces	Crown Prince Minye Kyawswa	14,000 troops, 600 cavalry, 40 elephants, 7 war ships, 90 war boats, 20 transport boats, 30 supply boats	(Note: Chronicles report as follows: The Maha Yazawin gives 7 regiments (70,000 troops, 6000 cavalry, 400 elephants) for the army, and 8 regiments (70 war ships, 700 war boats, 200 transport boats, 200 armored war boats) for the navy. The invasion forces consisted of 20,000 troops from the Shan states.; The Yazawin Thit gives 7 regiments (70,000 troops, 6000 cavalry, 400 elephants) for the army, and (7000 troops, 7 war ships, 700 war boats, 200 transport boats, 200 armored war boats, 300 supply boats) for the navy; The Hmannan Yazawin gives 7 regiments (70,000 troops, 6000 cavalry, 400 elephants) for the army, and 8 regiments (70 war ships, 700 war boats, 200 transport boats, 200 armored war boats) for the navy. The invasion forces consisted of 20,000 troops from the Shan states.; The Razadarit says 7 regiments (70,000 troops, 6000 cavalry, 400 elephants) for the army, and 8 regiments (70 war ships, 700 war boats, 200 transport boats, 500 armored war boats) for the navy.)
Army		7 regiments (7,000 troops, 600 cavalry, 40 elephants)	
Toungoo Regiment	Letya Zeya Thingyan of Toungoo		
Prome Regiment	Letya Pyanchi of Prome		
Salin Regiment	Nawrahta of Salin		
Badon Regiment	Thado Theinkhathu of Badon		
Pakhan Regiment	Tarabya I of Pakhan		
Onbaung Regiment	Tho Kyaung Bwa of Onbaung		
Nyaungshwe Regiment	Htaw Hmaing Gyi of Nyaungshwe		
Navy		8 regiments (7000 troops, 7 war ships, 70 war boats, 20 armored war boats, 20 transport boats, 30 supply boats)	
	Including: Sithu Pauk Hla of Yamethin; Sokkate		

=== Hanthawaddy Pegu ===
The following is a list of Hanthawaddy's defenses in the delta.

Pegu Order of Battle, c. November 1410
Unit	Commander	Strength	Reference(s)
Western Hanthawaddy Command	Byat Za		
Khebaung Regiment	Smin Than-Kye		
Bassein Regiment and Navy	Dein Mani-Yut		
Myaungmya Regiment and Navy	Byat Za		

== Battle of Launggyet (c. early 1411) ==
=== Ava ===
After withdrawing from the Irrawaddy delta back to Prome, Minye Kyawswa reconstituted his forces by transferring infantry regiments from the navy into the army for the purpose of invading Arakan. The rest of the naval forces went back to Ava. While the royal chronicles do not provide the exact strength figures for the reconstituted army, their narratives suggest that the bulk of the original 14,000-strong invasion force was still intact.

Ava Order of Battle, c. early 1411
Unit	Commander	Strength	Reference(s)
Ava Arakan Expeditionary Force	Crown Prince Minye Kyawswa	10,000+ troops	
	Regimental commanders included: Letya Zeya Thingyan; Sokkate		

=== Arakan ===
Arakan Order of Battle, c. early 1411
Unit	Commander	Strength	Reference(s)
Royal Arakan Armed Forces	King Min Saw Mon	?	

== Battle of Sandoway (c. mid 1411) ==
=== Hanthawaddy ===
Pegu Order of Battle, c. mid 1411
Unit	Commander	Strength	Reference(s)
Hanthawaddy Arakan Expeditionary Force	Smin Bya Paik (or Byat-Hat-Baik) (Note: This is the title according to the main chronicles. This is not the Smin Bya Paik that fell in action in 1402. This commander apparently succeeded the title of Smin Bya Paik. The Razadarit gives Smin Byat-Hta-Baik.)	5000 troops, 200 cavalry, 50 elephants	(Note: Chronicles report as follows: The Maha Yazawin gives 2 divisions (50000 troops, 200 cavalry, 50 elephants).; The Yazawin Thit gives 5000 (not 50,000) troops, 200 elephants.; The Hmannan Yazawin gives 2 divisions (50000 troops, 200 cavalry, 50 elephants).; The Razadarit gives 2 divisions (50000 troops, 200 cavalry, 50 elephants).)
1st Division	Smin Bya Paik		(Note: Chronicles report as follows: The Maha Yazawin gives 2 divisions (50000 troops, 200 cavalry, 50 elephants).; The Yazawin Thit gives 5000 (not 50,000) troops, 200 elephants.; The Hmannan Yazawin gives 2 divisions (50000 troops, 200 cavalry, 50 elephants).; The Razadarit gives 2 divisions (50000 troops, 200 cavalry, 50 elephants).)
2nd Division	Smin E-Kaung-Pein		(Note: Chronicles report as follows: The Maha Yazawin gives 2 divisions (50000 troops, 200 cavalry, 50 elephants).; The Yazawin Thit gives 5000 (not 50,000) troops, 200 elephants.; The Hmannan Yazawin gives 2 divisions (50000 troops, 200 cavalry, 50 elephants).; The Razadarit gives 2 divisions (50000 troops, 200 cavalry, 50 elephants).)

=== Ava ===
Ava Order of Battle, c. mid 1411
Unit	Commander	Strength	Reference(s)
Sandoway Regiment	Sokkate	?	

== Battle of Sandoway (c. late 1411–early 1412) ==
=== Ava ===
Ava Order of Battle, 1411–1412
Unit	Commander	Strength	Reference(s)
Ava Arakan Expeditionary Force	Minye Kyawswa	7 regiments (8000 troops, 300 cavalry, 30 elephants)	(Note: All three main chronicles give 7 regiments (80,000 troops, 3000 cavalry, 300 elephants). Sithu of Yamethin is the only commander mentioned aside from Minye Kyawswa. However, when the Ava Expeditionary Force rushed back to Ava to meet the invading Hsenwi forces three months later, the Maha Yazawin and the Hmannan do provide the commanders of the Ava army (7 regiments, 70,000 troops, 4000 cavalry, 200 elephants) that faced the enemy at the battle of Wetwin: Tarabya I of Pakhan, Yazathingyan of Amyint, Sithu Pauk Hla of Yamethin, Min Nyo of Kale, Thado of Mohnyin and Baya Gamani of Singu, in addition to Minye Kyawswa. They were probably the same commanders of the army that laid siege to Sandoway.)

=== Hanthawaddy ===
Pegu Order of Battle, 1411–1412
Unit	Commander	Strength	Reference(s)
Hanthawaddy Arakan Expeditionary Force	Smin Bya Paik	?	
1st Division	Smin Bya Paik		
2nd Division	Smin E-Kaung-Pein		

== Battle of Launggyet (c. April 1412) ==
=== Hanthawaddy ===
Pegu Order of Battle, c. April 1412
Unit	Commander	Strength	Reference(s)
Hanthawaddy Arakan Expeditionary Force	Smin Bya Paik	?	
1st Division	Smin Bya Paik		
2nd Division	Smin E-Kaung-Pein		

=== Ava ===
Ava Order of Battle, c. April 1412
Unit	Commander	Strength	Reference(s)
Launggyet Corps	Letya Zeya Thingyan of Toungoo		
1st Division	Letya Zeya Thingyan of Toungoo		
2nd Division	Sokkate		

== Bibliography ==
- Harvey, G. E. (1925). History of Burma: From the Earliest Times to 10 March 1824. London: Frank Cass & Co. Ltd.
- Kala, U (2006) [1724]. Maha Yazawin (in Burmese). Vol. 1–3 (4th printing ed.). Yangon: Ya-Pyei Publishing.
- Lieberman, Victor B. (2014) [1984]. Burmese Administrative Cycles: Anarchy and Conquest, c. 1580–1760. Princeton University Press. ISBN 978-0-691-05407-0.
- Maha Sithu (2012) [1798]. Myint Swe; Kyaw Win; Thein Hlaing (eds.). Yazawin Thit (in Burmese). Vol. 1–3 (2nd printing ed.). Yangon: Ya-Pyei Publishing.
- Pan Hla, Nai (2005) [1968]. Razadarit Ayedawbon (in Burmese) (8th printing ed.). Yangon: Armanthit Sarpay.
- Royal Historical Commission of Burma (2003) [1832]. Hmannan Yazawin (in Burmese). Vol. 1–3. Yangon: Ministry of Information, Myanmar.
- Sandamala Linkara, Ashin (1997–1999) [1931]. Rakhine Yazawinthit Kyan (in Burmese). Vol. 1–2. Yangon: Tetlan Sarpay.
