= Binnya Set of Dagon =

Binnya Set ဗညားစက်

Governor of Dagon
- Reign: 1415–1418
- Born: late 1390s (Note: Chronicles first mention Binnya Set only in 1415; he may have been the youngest son of Razadarit.); Pegu (Bago); Hanthawaddy kingdom
- Died: Ava Kingdom
- Father: Razadarit
- Religion: Theravada Buddhism

Binnya Set (Burmese: ဗညားစက်, pronounced [bəɲá sɛʔ]) was governor of Dagon from 1415 to 1418. He was appointed governor c. April 1415 (Note: (Yazawin Thit Vol. 1 2012: 262): Set's appointment at Dagon came soon after Minye Kyawswa's death in March 1415.) by his father King Razadarit of Hanthawaddy Pegu during the long running war against the northern Ava Kingdom. He was captured by the Ava armies in early 1418, and brought back to their capital of Ava (Inwa). There, Set was given good treatment befitting a prince. Chronicles do not say that he ever returned to his native country.

== Bibliography ==
- Maha Sithu (2012) [1798]. Kyaw Win; Thein Hlaing (eds.). Yazawin Thit (in Burmese). Vol. 1–3 (2nd ed.). Yangon: Ya-Pyei Publishing.
- Royal Historical Commission of Burma (2003) [1832]. Hmannan Yazawin (in Burmese). Vol. 1–3. Yangon: Ministry of Information, Myanmar.

Binnya Set of Dagon Hanthawaddy Dynasty Born: late 1390s
Royal titles
Preceded by	Governor of Dagon; 1415–1418	Succeeded by
