= Ava–Hanthawaddy War (1412–1414) orders of battle =

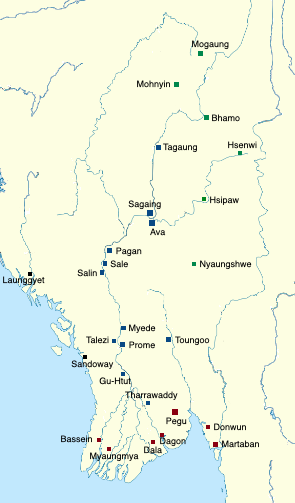
Ava forces fought Hanthawaddy and its northern allies Hsenwi, Maw and Ming China between 1412 and 1414.

This is a list of orders of battle for the 1412–1414 campaigns of the Ava–Hanthawaddy War (1408–1418). The list includes Ava's campaigns against Hanthawaddy's northern allies, Hsenwi (Theinni) and Maw (Mong Mao) as well as their overlord, Ming China. (Note: See (Maha Yazawin Vol. 2 2006: 31–34), (Yazawin Thit Vol. 1 2012: 239–247), and (Hmannan Vol. 2 2003: 8–21).)

== Background ==
=== Sources ===
The orders of battles for Ava in this article are sourced from the main royal chronicles—the Maha Yazawin, the Yazawin Thit and the Hmannan Yazawin, which primarily narrate the war from the Ava side. The orders of battle for Hanthawaddy Pegu are mainly sourced from Nai Pan Hla's version of the Razadarit Ayedawbon, which has incorporated narratives of the Pak Lat Chronicles. (Note: See (Pan Hla 2005: 276–286).)

=== Adjustment of strength figures ===
The military strength figures in this article have been reduced by an order of magnitude from those reported in the chronicles, following G.E. Harvey's and Victor Lieberman's analyses of Burmese chronicles' military strength figures in general. (Note: See (Harvey 1925: 333–335)'s "Numerical Note". (Lieberman 2014: 98) writing on the First Toungoo period concurs: "Military mobilizations were probably more of a boast than a realistic estimate. Modern industrial states have difficulty placing 10% of their people under arms.")

== Ava–Hsenwi and Ming China (1412) ==
=== Battle of Wetwin (c. April 1412) ===
==== Hsenwi ====
Hsenwi Order of Battle, c. April 1412
Unit	Commander	Strength (Note: Unless otherwise stated, the military mobilization figures in this article are reduced by an order of magnitude from those reported in the royal chronicles, per G.E. Harvey's analysis in his History of Burma (1925) in the section Numerical Note (pp. 333–335).)	Reference(s)
Hsenwi Army	Hkam Hkai Hpa †	?	(Note: The main chronicles do not provide Hsenwi's overall strength; they only report that Ava forces captured 800 troops, 200 horses and 6 elephants, and over 3000 Hsenwi troops were killed. They do not provide the names of the sawbwa, the son of the sawbwa and the son-in-law of the sawbwa. According to the Hsenwi Yazawin, the sawbwa at the time was Hkam Hkai Hpa, and his middle son Hkam Yawt Hpa succeeded after his death.)
Including...			(Note: The main chronicles do not provide Hsenwi's overall strength; they only report that Ava forces captured 800 troops, 200 horses and 6 elephants, and over 3000 Hsenwi troops were killed. They do not provide the names of the sawbwa, the son of the sawbwa and the son-in-law of the sawbwa. According to the Hsenwi Yazawin, the sawbwa at the time was Hkam Hkai Hpa, and his middle son Hkam Yawt Hpa succeeded after his death.)
	son of the sawbwa (Hkam Yawt Hpa?)		(Note: The main chronicles do not provide Hsenwi's overall strength; they only report that Ava forces captured 800 troops, 200 horses and 6 elephants, and over 3000 Hsenwi troops were killed. They do not provide the names of the sawbwa, the son of the sawbwa and the son-in-law of the sawbwa. According to the Hsenwi Yazawin, the sawbwa at the time was Hkam Hkai Hpa, and his middle son Hkam Yawt Hpa succeeded after his death.)
	son-in-law of the sawbwa		(Note: The main chronicles do not provide Hsenwi's overall strength; they only report that Ava forces captured 800 troops, 200 horses and 6 elephants, and over 3000 Hsenwi troops were killed. They do not provide the names of the sawbwa, the son of the sawbwa and the son-in-law of the sawbwa. According to the Hsenwi Yazawin, the sawbwa at the time was Hkam Hkai Hpa, and his middle son Hkam Yawt Hpa succeeded after his death.)

==== Ava ====
Ava Order of Battle, c. April 1412
Unit	Commander	Strength	Reference(s)
Royal Ava Armed Forces	Crown Prince Minye Kyawswa	7 regiments (7000 troops, 400 cavalry, 20 elephants)	(Note: Chronicles report as follows: Maha Yazawin and Hmannan: 7 regiments (70,000 troops, 4000 cavalry, 200 elephants); Yazawin Thit does not provide a specific list except that Thado and Nyo were commanders in the force.; Maha Yazawin and Hmannan both say that Tarabya of Pagan was a commander. This is a typographical error. First, Hmannan calls him the "Lord of Pakhan" at the battle of Talezi, in early 1413. Second, by their own account, both chronicles say Tarabya became governor of Pagan only after the campaign in 1413.)
Pakhan Regiment	Tarabya I of Pakhan		
Amyint Regiment	Yazathingyan of Amyint		
Yamethin Regiment	Sithu Pauk Hla of Yamethin		
Kale Regiment	Min Nyo of Kale		
Mohnyin Regiment	Thado of Mohnyin		
Singu Regiment	Baya Gamani of Singu		
Ava Regiment	Minye Kyawswa		

=== Siege of Hsenwi (c. May–November 1412) ===
The siege lasted six months. Ming Chinese forces tried to lift the siege in the fifth month.

==== Ava ====
Ava Order of Battle, 1412
Unit	Commander	Strength	Reference(s)
Ava Expeditionary Force	Crown Prince Minye Kyawswa	7 regiments, approximately (7000 troops, 400 cavalry, 20 elephants)	
Pakhan Regiment	Tarabya I of Pakhan		
Amyint Regiment	Yazathingyan of Amyint		
Yamethin Regiment	Sithu Pauk Hla of Yamethin		
Kale Regiment	Min Nyo of Kale		
Mohnyin Regiment	Thado of Mohnyin		
Singu Regiment	Baya Gamani of Singu		
Ava Regiment	Minye Kyawswa		

==== Hsenwi ====
Hsenwi Order of Battle, 1412
Unit	Commander	Strength	Reference(s)
Hsenwi Army	son of the deceased sawbwa (Hkam Yawt Hpa?)	?	

=== Battle of Singandaw (c. October 1412) ===
The Chinese attempt to lift the siege came about five months into the siege. After the Chinese forces were driven back, the siege continued until Hanthawaddy forces attacked Prome.

==== Ming Chinese ====
Ming Order of Battle, c. October 1412
Unit	Commander	Strength	Reference(s)
Yunnan Expeditionary Force	?	20,000 troops, 2000 cavalry	(Note: The main Burmese chronicles report the Chinese army's strength as 200,000 infantry, 20,000 cavalry.)

==== Ava ====
Ava Order of Battle, c. October 1412
Unit	Commander	Strength	Reference(s)
1st Division	Minye Kyawswa	3 regiments (4000 troops, 300 cavalry, 20 elephants)	(Note: The main Burmese chronicles report that Minye Kyawswa took 40,000 troops, 3000 cavalry and 200 elephants to face the Chinese while the rest remained in charge of the siege.)
Left Regiment			(Note: The main Burmese chronicles report that Minye Kyawswa took 40,000 troops, 3000 cavalry and 200 elephants to face the Chinese while the rest remained in charge of the siege.)
Right Regiment			(Note: The main Burmese chronicles report that Minye Kyawswa took 40,000 troops, 3000 cavalry and 200 elephants to face the Chinese while the rest remained in charge of the siege.)
Central Regiment			(Note: The main Burmese chronicles report that Minye Kyawswa took 40,000 troops, 3000 cavalry and 200 elephants to face the Chinese while the rest remained in charge of the siege.)

== Hanthawaddy invasion of Ava (1412–1413) ==
Razadarit launched the invasion c. 8 November 1412. (Note: The Razadarit Ayedawbon gives the 5th waxing of Nadaw 770 ME [sic] as the start of the Prome campaign. However, the 770 ME is a typographical error since the main chronicles say the campaign took place in 774 ME. This means the invasion date was probably the 5th waxing of Nadaw 774 ME (8 November 1412).)

=== Siege of Prome (November 1412) ===
==== Hanthawaddy Pegu ====
Pegu Order of Battle, November 1412
Unit	Commander	Strength	Reference(s)
Royal Hanthawaddy Armed Forces	King Razadarit	8 regiments (12,000 troops, 800 cavalry, 30 elephants), 12 flotillas	(Note: The main chronicles report the Hanthawaddy strength as: 8 regiments (120,000 troops, 8000 cavalry, 300 elephants) for the army, and 12 naval flotillas for the navy.; The Razadarit does not provide any overall strength figures for the army or the navy. It does say that a portion of the invasion forces (40,000 troops, 400 cavalry, 50 elephants) was left behind to continue the siege.)
Army	Binnya Bassein	8 regiments	(Note: The main chronicles report the Hanthawaddy strength as: 8 regiments (120,000 troops, 8000 cavalry, 300 elephants) for the army, and 12 naval flotillas for the navy.; The Razadarit does not provide any overall strength figures for the army or the navy. It does say that a portion of the invasion forces (40,000 troops, 400 cavalry, 50 elephants) was left behind to continue the siege.)
Navy		12 flotillas	(Note: The main chronicles report the Hanthawaddy strength as: 8 regiments (120,000 troops, 8000 cavalry, 300 elephants) for the army, and 12 naval flotillas for the navy.; The Razadarit does not provide any overall strength figures for the army or the navy. It does say that a portion of the invasion forces (40,000 troops, 400 cavalry, 50 elephants) was left behind to continue the siege.)

==== Ava ====
Ava Order of Battle, November 1412
Unit	Commander	Strength	Reference(s)
Prome Regiment	Letya Pyanchi of Prome		

=== Siege of Prome (December 1412) ===
About one month into the siege, Razadarit took the majority of the invasion force and went to Ye in the southern Martaban province where Siamese forces reportedly had attacked. He left an over 4000-strong army to maintain the siege. Meanwhile, Ava forces led by Minkhaung came down to lift the siege.

==== Hanthawaddy Pegu ====
Pegu Order of Battle, December 1412
Unit	Commander	Strength	Reference(s)
Siege Army	Prince Binnya Bassein; Smin E-Ba-Ye (Deputy)	4,000+ troops, 400 cavalry, 10 elephants	(Note: Chronicles report the strength of the remaining siege army as follows: Maha Yazawin: 50,000 troops, 400 cavalry, 200 elephants; Yazawin Thit: 5,000 (not 50,000) troops, 4000 cavalry, 100 elephants; Hmannan: 50,000 troops, 4000 cavalry, 100 elephants; Razadarit: 40,000 troops, 400 cavalry, 50 elephants)
1st Regiment	Smin Than-Kye		(Note: Chronicles report the strength of the remaining siege army as follows: Maha Yazawin: 50,000 troops, 400 cavalry, 200 elephants; Yazawin Thit: 5,000 (not 50,000) troops, 4000 cavalry, 100 elephants; Hmannan: 50,000 troops, 4000 cavalry, 100 elephants; Razadarit: 40,000 troops, 400 cavalry, 50 elephants)
2nd Regiment	Smin Upakaung		(Note: Chronicles report the strength of the remaining siege army as follows: Maha Yazawin: 50,000 troops, 400 cavalry, 200 elephants; Yazawin Thit: 5,000 (not 50,000) troops, 4000 cavalry, 100 elephants; Hmannan: 50,000 troops, 4000 cavalry, 100 elephants; Razadarit: 40,000 troops, 400 cavalry, 50 elephants)
3rd Regiment	Smin Sam Lek		(Note: Chronicles report the strength of the remaining siege army as follows: Maha Yazawin: 50,000 troops, 400 cavalry, 200 elephants; Yazawin Thit: 5,000 (not 50,000) troops, 4000 cavalry, 100 elephants; Hmannan: 50,000 troops, 4000 cavalry, 100 elephants; Razadarit: 40,000 troops, 400 cavalry, 50 elephants)
4th Regiment	Smin Lauk Na-Re		(Note: Chronicles report the strength of the remaining siege army as follows: Maha Yazawin: 50,000 troops, 400 cavalry, 200 elephants; Yazawin Thit: 5,000 (not 50,000) troops, 4000 cavalry, 100 elephants; Hmannan: 50,000 troops, 4000 cavalry, 100 elephants; Razadarit: 40,000 troops, 400 cavalry, 50 elephants)
5th Regiment	Smin Lauk Shein		(Note: Chronicles report the strength of the remaining siege army as follows: Maha Yazawin: 50,000 troops, 400 cavalry, 200 elephants; Yazawin Thit: 5,000 (not 50,000) troops, 4000 cavalry, 100 elephants; Hmannan: 50,000 troops, 4000 cavalry, 100 elephants; Razadarit: 40,000 troops, 400 cavalry, 50 elephants)
6th Regiment	Smin Lauk Pin		(Note: Chronicles report the strength of the remaining siege army as follows: Maha Yazawin: 50,000 troops, 400 cavalry, 200 elephants; Yazawin Thit: 5,000 (not 50,000) troops, 4000 cavalry, 100 elephants; Hmannan: 50,000 troops, 4000 cavalry, 100 elephants; Razadarit: 40,000 troops, 400 cavalry, 50 elephants)
7th Regiment	Smin Saw Kan-Khet		(Note: Chronicles report the strength of the remaining siege army as follows: Maha Yazawin: 50,000 troops, 400 cavalry, 200 elephants; Yazawin Thit: 5,000 (not 50,000) troops, 4000 cavalry, 100 elephants; Hmannan: 50,000 troops, 4000 cavalry, 100 elephants; Razadarit: 40,000 troops, 400 cavalry, 50 elephants)
8th Regiment	Smin Udein		(Note: Chronicles report the strength of the remaining siege army as follows: Maha Yazawin: 50,000 troops, 400 cavalry, 200 elephants; Yazawin Thit: 5,000 (not 50,000) troops, 4000 cavalry, 100 elephants; Hmannan: 50,000 troops, 4000 cavalry, 100 elephants; Razadarit: 40,000 troops, 400 cavalry, 50 elephants)

==== Ava ====
Ava Order of Battle, December 1412
Unit	Commander	Strength	Reference(s)
Royal Main Army	King Minkhaung I	7 regiments (7000+ troops, 600 cavalry, 40 elephants)	(Note: Chronicles report different figures for the strength of the Ava relief force: Maha Yazawin: 7 regiments (20,000 troops, 6000 cavalry, 400 elephants); Yazawin Thit: 120,000 troops, 6000 cavalry, 400 elephants; Hmannan: 7 regiments (120,000 troops, 6000 cavalry, 100 elephants); Razadarit: 7 regiments (70,000 troops, 6000 cavalry, 400 elephants). The Razadarit also provides a list of commanders of the relief force by their name/title except for the lord of Myedu.)
? Regiment	Min Maha		(Note: Chronicles report different figures for the strength of the Ava relief force: Maha Yazawin: 7 regiments (20,000 troops, 6000 cavalry, 400 elephants); Yazawin Thit: 120,000 troops, 6000 cavalry, 400 elephants; Hmannan: 7 regiments (120,000 troops, 6000 cavalry, 100 elephants); Razadarit: 7 regiments (70,000 troops, 6000 cavalry, 400 elephants). The Razadarit also provides a list of commanders of the relief force by their name/title except for the lord of Myedu.)
Myedu Regiment	Lord of Myedu		(Note: Chronicles report different figures for the strength of the Ava relief force: Maha Yazawin: 7 regiments (20,000 troops, 6000 cavalry, 400 elephants); Yazawin Thit: 120,000 troops, 6000 cavalry, 400 elephants; Hmannan: 7 regiments (120,000 troops, 6000 cavalry, 100 elephants); Razadarit: 7 regiments (70,000 troops, 6000 cavalry, 400 elephants). The Razadarit also provides a list of commanders of the relief force by their name/title except for the lord of Myedu.)
Salin Regiment	Nawrahta of Salin		(Note: Chronicles report different figures for the strength of the Ava relief force: Maha Yazawin: 7 regiments (20,000 troops, 6000 cavalry, 400 elephants); Yazawin Thit: 120,000 troops, 6000 cavalry, 400 elephants; Hmannan: 7 regiments (120,000 troops, 6000 cavalry, 100 elephants); Razadarit: 7 regiments (70,000 troops, 6000 cavalry, 400 elephants). The Razadarit also provides a list of commanders of the relief force by their name/title except for the lord of Myedu.)
Talok Regiment	Yazathu of Talok		(Note: Chronicles report different figures for the strength of the Ava relief force: Maha Yazawin: 7 regiments (20,000 troops, 6000 cavalry, 400 elephants); Yazawin Thit: 120,000 troops, 6000 cavalry, 400 elephants; Hmannan: 7 regiments (120,000 troops, 6000 cavalry, 100 elephants); Razadarit: 7 regiments (70,000 troops, 6000 cavalry, 400 elephants). The Razadarit also provides a list of commanders of the relief force by their name/title except for the lord of Myedu.)
Nyaungyan Regiment	Baya Kyawthu of Nyaungyan		(Note: Chronicles report different figures for the strength of the Ava relief force: Maha Yazawin: 7 regiments (20,000 troops, 6000 cavalry, 400 elephants); Yazawin Thit: 120,000 troops, 6000 cavalry, 400 elephants; Hmannan: 7 regiments (120,000 troops, 6000 cavalry, 100 elephants); Razadarit: 7 regiments (70,000 troops, 6000 cavalry, 400 elephants). The Razadarit also provides a list of commanders of the relief force by their name/title except for the lord of Myedu.)
Taungdwin Regiment	Thihapate III of Taungdwin		(Note: Chronicles report different figures for the strength of the Ava relief force: Maha Yazawin: 7 regiments (20,000 troops, 6000 cavalry, 400 elephants); Yazawin Thit: 120,000 troops, 6000 cavalry, 400 elephants; Hmannan: 7 regiments (120,000 troops, 6000 cavalry, 100 elephants); Razadarit: 7 regiments (70,000 troops, 6000 cavalry, 400 elephants). The Razadarit also provides a list of commanders of the relief force by their name/title except for the lord of Myedu.)
Royal Regiment	Minkhaung I		(Note: Chronicles report different figures for the strength of the Ava relief force: Maha Yazawin: 7 regiments (20,000 troops, 6000 cavalry, 400 elephants); Yazawin Thit: 120,000 troops, 6000 cavalry, 400 elephants; Hmannan: 7 regiments (120,000 troops, 6000 cavalry, 100 elephants); Razadarit: 7 regiments (70,000 troops, 6000 cavalry, 400 elephants). The Razadarit also provides a list of commanders of the relief force by their name/title except for the lord of Myedu.)

=== Siege of Talezi (December 1412–March 1413) ===
The siege of the Hanthawaddy fort at Talezi (opposite the river from Prome) lasted "about four months", into March 1413. (Note: Per the Razadarit Ayedawbon, four months into the siege, right before the new year [before 30 March 1413].)

==== Ava ====
This was the expeditionary force that returned from Hsenwi. Only Tarabya's name is specifically mentioned in the battle.

Ava Order of Battle, December 1413
Unit	Commander	Strength	Reference(s)
Ava Expeditionary Force	Crown Prince Minye Kyawswa	6000 troops, 40 war boats, 80 transport boats	
Including...
	Tarabya I of Pakhan		

==== Hanthawaddy Pegu ====
Pegu Order of Battle, December 1413
Unit	Commander	Strength	Reference(s)
Siege Army	Prince Binnya Bassein; Smin E-Ba-Ye (Deputy)	4,000+ troops, 400 cavalry, 10 elephants	
1st Regiment	Smin Than-Kye		
2nd Regiment	Smin Upakaung		
3rd Regiment	Smin Sam Lek		
4th Regiment	Smin Lauk Na-Re		
5th Regiment	Smin Lauk Shein		
6th Regiment	Smin Lauk Pin		
7th Regiment	Smin Saw Kan-Khet		
8th Regiment	Smin Udein		

=== Battle of Talezi (March 1413) ===
Razadarit sent in a reconstituted land-naval force to retake Talezi in March 1413. A naval battle took place in the Irrawaddy, south of Talezi.

==== Hanthawaddy ====
Pegu Order of Battle, March 1413
Unit	Commander	Strength	Reference(s)
Navy	Lagun Ein † Smin Awa Naing (Deputy)	170 war boats, 80 transport boats	(Note: Razadarit: 2500 boats (1700 war boats, 800 transport boats) for the navy; three squadrons commanded by Lagun Ein, Awa Naing and Than-Byat.; Yazawin Thit and Hmannan: 300 troops in Lagun Ein's squadron. Awa Naing became the overall commander after Lagun Ein's death.)
1st Squadron	Lagun Ein †	300 troops	(Note: Razadarit: 2500 boats (1700 war boats, 800 transport boats) for the navy; three squadrons commanded by Lagun Ein, Awa Naing and Than-Byat.; Yazawin Thit and Hmannan: 300 troops in Lagun Ein's squadron. Awa Naing became the overall commander after Lagun Ein's death.)
2nd Squadron	Smin Awa Naing		(Note: Razadarit: 2500 boats (1700 war boats, 800 transport boats) for the navy; three squadrons commanded by Lagun Ein, Awa Naing and Than-Byat.; Yazawin Thit and Hmannan: 300 troops in Lagun Ein's squadron. Awa Naing became the overall commander after Lagun Ein's death.)
3rd Squadron	Smin Than-Byat		(Note: Razadarit: 2500 boats (1700 war boats, 800 transport boats) for the navy; three squadrons commanded by Lagun Ein, Awa Naing and Than-Byat.; Yazawin Thit and Hmannan: 300 troops in Lagun Ein's squadron. Awa Naing became the overall commander after Lagun Ein's death.)
Army	Smin Bayan Upakaung	10,000 troops, 2000 cavalry, 100 elephants	(Note: Razadarit: 100,000 troops, 20,000 cavalry, 10,000 elephants. Smin Upakaung had become Smin Bayan.; Yazawin Thit: In all, over 3000 Hanthawaddy troops, including commanders Nyi-Kaung-Thein and E-Ba-Ye died.)
Including...			(Note: Razadarit: 100,000 troops, 20,000 cavalry, 10,000 elephants. Smin Upakaung had become Smin Bayan.; Yazawin Thit: In all, over 3000 Hanthawaddy troops, including commanders Nyi-Kaung-Thein and E-Ba-Ye died.)
	Binnya Bo		(Note: Razadarit: 100,000 troops, 20,000 cavalry, 10,000 elephants. Smin Upakaung had become Smin Bayan.; Yazawin Thit: In all, over 3000 Hanthawaddy troops, including commanders Nyi-Kaung-Thein and E-Ba-Ye died.)
	Smin Bya Paik (Bya-Hta-Baik)		(Note: Razadarit: 100,000 troops, 20,000 cavalry, 10,000 elephants. Smin Upakaung had become Smin Bayan.; Yazawin Thit: In all, over 3000 Hanthawaddy troops, including commanders Nyi-Kaung-Thein and E-Ba-Ye died.)
	Smin Sam Lek		(Note: Razadarit: 100,000 troops, 20,000 cavalry, 10,000 elephants. Smin Upakaung had become Smin Bayan.; Yazawin Thit: In all, over 3000 Hanthawaddy troops, including commanders Nyi-Kaung-Thein and E-Ba-Ye died.)
	Smin E-Ba-Ye †		(Note: Razadarit: 100,000 troops, 20,000 cavalry, 10,000 elephants. Smin Upakaung had become Smin Bayan.; Yazawin Thit: In all, over 3000 Hanthawaddy troops, including commanders Nyi-Kaung-Thein and E-Ba-Ye died.)
	Nyi-Kaung-Thein †		(Note: Razadarit: 100,000 troops, 20,000 cavalry, 10,000 elephants. Smin Upakaung had become Smin Bayan.; Yazawin Thit: In all, over 3000 Hanthawaddy troops, including commanders Nyi-Kaung-Thein and E-Ba-Ye died.)

==== Ava ====
Ava Order of Battle, March 1413
Unit	Commander	Strength	Reference(s)
Ava Expeditionary Force	Minye Kyawswa		
Navy			
1st Squadron	Sokkate		
2nd Squadron	Thray Sithu of Myinsaing		
3rd Squadron	Uzana		
4th Squadron	Sittuyingathu		

== Ava invasion of Hanthawaddy (1413) ==
Ava forces invaded Hanthawaddy in April–May 1413. (Note: Last battles of the campaigns were fought in Nayon 775 ME (30 April 1413 to 28 May 1413).)

=== Ava ===
Ava Order of Battle, April–May 1413
Unit	Commander	Strength	Reference(s)
Vanguard Army	Minye Kyawswa		(Note: Chronicles say Minye Kyawswa's army followed the enemy while his father's army followed suit. They do not provide the strengths of the armies or specific commander lists. Presumably, the same commanders with similar troop strengths as before.)
Including...			(Note: Chronicles say Minye Kyawswa's army followed the enemy while his father's army followed suit. They do not provide the strengths of the armies or specific commander lists. Presumably, the same commanders with similar troop strengths as before.)
Prome Regiment	Letya Pyanchi of Prome †		(Note: Chronicles say Minye Kyawswa's army followed the enemy while his father's army followed suit. They do not provide the strengths of the armies or specific commander lists. Presumably, the same commanders with similar troop strengths as before.)
Pakhan Regiment	Tarabya I of Pakhan		(Note: Chronicles say Minye Kyawswa's army followed the enemy while his father's army followed suit. They do not provide the strengths of the armies or specific commander lists. Presumably, the same commanders with similar troop strengths as before.)
Myedu Regiment	Lord of Myedu (Thettawshay of Myedu?)		(Note: Chronicles say Minye Kyawswa's army followed the enemy while his father's army followed suit. They do not provide the strengths of the armies or specific commander lists. Presumably, the same commanders with similar troop strengths as before.)
Royal Main Army	Minkhaung I		(Note: Chronicles say Minye Kyawswa's army followed the enemy while his father's army followed suit. They do not provide the strengths of the armies or specific commander lists. Presumably, the same commanders with similar troop strengths as before.)

=== Hanthawaddy Pegu ===
Pegu Order of Battle, April–May 1413
Unit	Commander	Strength	Reference(s)
Western Command	Dein Mani-Yut		(Note: Chronicles do not provide any specific commanders of the Hanthawaddy Western and Central Commands except to say that Bassein, Myaungmya, Khebaung, Dala, Dagon and Syriam all fell quickly. Only Hpaunglin and Hmawbi remained under Hanthawaddy control.)
Bassein Regiment			(Note: Chronicles do not provide any specific commanders of the Hanthawaddy Western and Central Commands except to say that Bassein, Myaungmya, Khebaung, Dala, Dagon and Syriam all fell quickly. Only Hpaunglin and Hmawbi remained under Hanthawaddy control.)
Myaungmya Regiment	?		(Note: Chronicles do not provide any specific commanders of the Hanthawaddy Western and Central Commands except to say that Bassein, Myaungmya, Khebaung, Dala, Dagon and Syriam all fell quickly. Only Hpaunglin and Hmawbi remained under Hanthawaddy control.)
Khebaung Regiment			(Note: Chronicles do not provide any specific commanders of the Hanthawaddy Western and Central Commands except to say that Bassein, Myaungmya, Khebaung, Dala, Dagon and Syriam all fell quickly. Only Hpaunglin and Hmawbi remained under Hanthawaddy control.)
Southern Central Command	Smin Awa Naing		(Note: Chronicles do not provide any specific commanders of the Hanthawaddy Western and Central Commands except to say that Bassein, Myaungmya, Khebaung, Dala, Dagon and Syriam all fell quickly. Only Hpaunglin and Hmawbi remained under Hanthawaddy control.)
Dala Regiment			(Note: Chronicles do not provide any specific commanders of the Hanthawaddy Western and Central Commands except to say that Bassein, Myaungmya, Khebaung, Dala, Dagon and Syriam all fell quickly. Only Hpaunglin and Hmawbi remained under Hanthawaddy control.)
Dagon Regiment			(Note: Chronicles do not provide any specific commanders of the Hanthawaddy Western and Central Commands except to say that Bassein, Myaungmya, Khebaung, Dala, Dagon and Syriam all fell quickly. Only Hpaunglin and Hmawbi remained under Hanthawaddy control.)
Syriam Regiment			(Note: Chronicles do not provide any specific commanders of the Hanthawaddy Western and Central Commands except to say that Bassein, Myaungmya, Khebaung, Dala, Dagon and Syriam all fell quickly. Only Hpaunglin and Hmawbi remained under Hanthawaddy control.)
Capital Region Command	Razadarit		(Note: Chronicles report as follows: Binnya Kyan (5000 troops, 100 elephants); Binnya Dhammaraza (3000 troops, 100 elephants); Binnya Bassein (3000 troops, 100 elephants); Smin Paik-Nye of Za-ywe-ohn (400 to 500 troops, one elephant); Smin Upakaung was the commander of Hpaunglin.; Razadarit's headquarters was the Kamabyin fort near Pegu.)
Including...			(Note: Chronicles report as follows: Binnya Kyan (5000 troops, 100 elephants); Binnya Dhammaraza (3000 troops, 100 elephants); Binnya Bassein (3000 troops, 100 elephants); Smin Paik-Nye of Za-ywe-ohn (400 to 500 troops, one elephant); Smin Upakaung was the commander of Hpaunglin.; Razadarit's headquarters was the Kamabyin fort near Pegu.)
Hmawbi Regiment			(Note: Chronicles report as follows: Binnya Kyan (5000 troops, 100 elephants); Binnya Dhammaraza (3000 troops, 100 elephants); Binnya Bassein (3000 troops, 100 elephants); Smin Paik-Nye of Za-ywe-ohn (400 to 500 troops, one elephant); Smin Upakaung was the commander of Hpaunglin.; Razadarit's headquarters was the Kamabyin fort near Pegu.)
Hpaunglin Regiment	Smin Bayan Upakaung		(Note: Chronicles report as follows: Binnya Kyan (5000 troops, 100 elephants); Binnya Dhammaraza (3000 troops, 100 elephants); Binnya Bassein (3000 troops, 100 elephants); Smin Paik-Nye of Za-ywe-ohn (400 to 500 troops, one elephant); Smin Upakaung was the commander of Hpaunglin.; Razadarit's headquarters was the Kamabyin fort near Pegu.)
Za-ywe-ohn Regiment	Smin Paik-Nye	400+ troops, 1 elephant	(Note: Chronicles report as follows: Binnya Kyan (5000 troops, 100 elephants); Binnya Dhammaraza (3000 troops, 100 elephants); Binnya Bassein (3000 troops, 100 elephants); Smin Paik-Nye of Za-ywe-ohn (400 to 500 troops, one elephant); Smin Upakaung was the commander of Hpaunglin.; Razadarit's headquarters was the Kamabyin fort near Pegu.)
1st Pegu Regiment	Binnya Kyan	500 troops, 10 elephants	(Note: Chronicles report as follows: Binnya Kyan (5000 troops, 100 elephants); Binnya Dhammaraza (3000 troops, 100 elephants); Binnya Bassein (3000 troops, 100 elephants); Smin Paik-Nye of Za-ywe-ohn (400 to 500 troops, one elephant); Smin Upakaung was the commander of Hpaunglin.; Razadarit's headquarters was the Kamabyin fort near Pegu.)
2nd Pegu Regiment	Binnya Dhammaraza	300 troops, 10 elephants	(Note: Chronicles report as follows: Binnya Kyan (5000 troops, 100 elephants); Binnya Dhammaraza (3000 troops, 100 elephants); Binnya Bassein (3000 troops, 100 elephants); Smin Paik-Nye of Za-ywe-ohn (400 to 500 troops, one elephant); Smin Upakaung was the commander of Hpaunglin.; Razadarit's headquarters was the Kamabyin fort near Pegu.)
3rd Pegu Regiment	Binnya Bassein	300 troops, 10 elephants	(Note: Chronicles report as follows: Binnya Kyan (5000 troops, 100 elephants); Binnya Dhammaraza (3000 troops, 100 elephants); Binnya Bassein (3000 troops, 100 elephants); Smin Paik-Nye of Za-ywe-ohn (400 to 500 troops, one elephant); Smin Upakaung was the commander of Hpaunglin.; Razadarit's headquarters was the Kamabyin fort near Pegu.)

== Ava–Maw (1413–1414) ==
Chronicles have just one major battle, at Myedu. The battle probably took place in late 1413 (or early 1414). (Note: The battle of Myedu took place after the rainy season of 775 ME, meaning sometime between November 1413 and March 1414.)

=== Battle of Myedu ===
==== Ava ====
Ava Order of Battle, c. November 1413
Unit	Commander	Strength	Reference(s)
Ava Army	Minye Kyawswa	11 regiments (8000 troops, 400 cavalry, 30 elephants)	(Note: Chronicles give: 11 regiments (80,000 troops, 4000 cavalry, 300 elephants))

==== Maw ====
Maw Order of Battle, c. November 1413
Unit	Commander	Strength	Reference(s)
Maw Army			(Note: The sawbwas of Mawdon and Mawke were brothers. The brothers were siblings of the Maw (Mong Mao) ruler Si Xing Fa. One of the brothers may have been Si Ren Fa who became the ruler of Maw after Si Xing Fa's death.)
Mawdon Regiment			(Note: The sawbwas of Mawdon and Mawke were brothers. The brothers were siblings of the Maw (Mong Mao) ruler Si Xing Fa. One of the brothers may have been Si Ren Fa who became the ruler of Maw after Si Xing Fa's death.)
Mawke Regiment			(Note: The sawbwas of Mawdon and Mawke were brothers. The brothers were siblings of the Maw (Mong Mao) ruler Si Xing Fa. One of the brothers may have been Si Ren Fa who became the ruler of Maw after Si Xing Fa's death.)

== Bibliography ==
- Fernquest, Jon (Spring 2006). "Rajadhirat's Mask of Command: Military Leadership in Burma (c. 1384–1421)" (PDF). SOAS Bulletin of Burma Research. 4 (1). Archived (PDF) from the original on 2020-03-22.
- Fernquest, Jon (Autumn 2006). "Crucible of War: Burma and the Ming in the Tai Frontier Zone (1382–1454)" (PDF). SOAS Bulletin of Burma Research. 4 (2). Archived (PDF) from the original on 2017-08-10.
- Harvey, G. E. (1925). History of Burma: From the Earliest Times to 10 March 1824. London: Frank Cass & Co. Ltd.
- Kala, U (2006) [1724]. Maha Yazawin (in Burmese). Vol. 1–3 (4th printing ed.). Yangon: Ya-Pyei Publishing.
- Lieberman, Victor B. (2014) [1984]. Burmese Administrative Cycles: Anarchy and Conquest, c. 1580–1760. Princeton University Press. ISBN 978-0-691-05407-0.
- Maha Sithu (2012) [1798]. Myint Swe; Kyaw Win; Thein Hlaing (eds.). Yazawin Thit (in Burmese). Vol. 1–3 (2nd printing ed.). Yangon: Ya-Pyei Publishing.
- Pan Hla, Nai (2005) [1968]. Razadarit Ayedawbon (in Burmese) (8th printing ed.). Yangon: Armanthit Sarpay.
- Royal Historical Commission of Burma (2003) [1832]. Hmannan Yazawin (in Burmese). Vol. 1–3. Yangon: Ministry of Information, Myanmar.
- Scott, James George; Hardiman, John Percy (1899). Gazetteer of Upper Burma and the Shan States. Vol. 1. Rangoon: Government Printing, Burma.
