= South Hsenwi =

Former Shan State in Burma

Coordinates: 22°24′N 98°2′E

- State of the Shan States
- 1888–1959
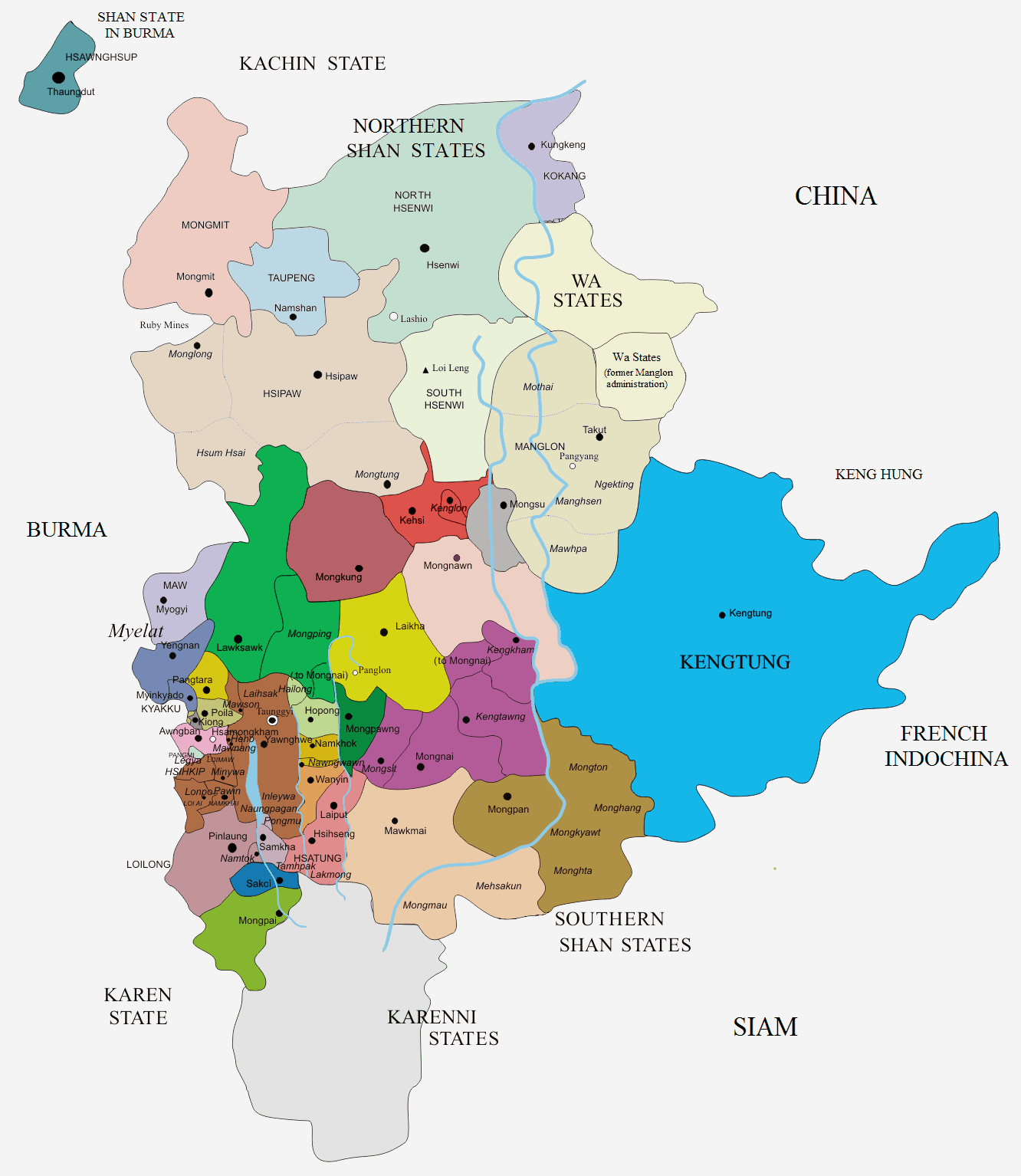
- South Hsenwi in a map of the Shan States
- Capital: Mongyai
- Area
  - 1901: 2,400 km^{2} (930 sq mi)
- Population
  - 1901: 67,836
- History
  - Hsenwi split into two states: 1888
  - Abdication of the last ruler: 1959
Preceded by	Succeeded by
Hsenwi	Shan State

South Hsenwi was a Shan state in the Northern Shan States in what is today Burma. The capital was Mongyai town which had a population of about 2000 in the 19th century.

South Hsenwi had an area of 2400 m^{2} and a population of 67,836 in 1901; its estimated revenue was £4800.

== History ==
According to tradition, the predecessor state of Sivirattha was founded before 650 AD. This legendary state became Hsenwi State with the passing of the centuries. Hsenwi was the largest of the cis-Salween Shan states, and at one time included all of what are now the present states of North and South Hsenwi, Kehsi Mansam, Mong Hsu, Mong Sang, and Mong Nawng. It also held Mang Lon and other Wa states east of the Salween in a protectorate-like arrangement. During Burmese times, the state lost control of these areas and at the time of the annexation following British rule in Burma, Hsenwi was composed of five de jure divisions; but the administration of the area was in chaos, with no central control. After the pacification of the region in March 1888, the colonial administration divided Hsenwi into two states: North Hsenwi, which was assigned to a successful adventurer, Hkun Sang, of Ton Hong, and South Hsenwi which went to Nawmong, of the old Shan ruling house. Lashio, the headquarters of the superintendent of the Northern Shan State, was located in North Hsenwi. The last ruler of South Hsenwi abdicated in 1959. The state became part of Shan State and, despite the independence struggle of the latter, eventually part of Burma.

=== Rulers ===
The rulers of South Hsenwi bore the title Saopha.

==== Saophas ====
- Mar 1888 - 1913 Sao Naw Möng (b. 1855 - d. 1913)
- 1913 - 1946 Sao Song (b. 1888 - d. 1946)
- 1946 - 29 May 1959 Sao Hsu Hom
