= North Hsenwi =

Former Shan State in Burma

Coordinates: 22°56′N 97°45′E

- State of the Shan States
- 1888–1959
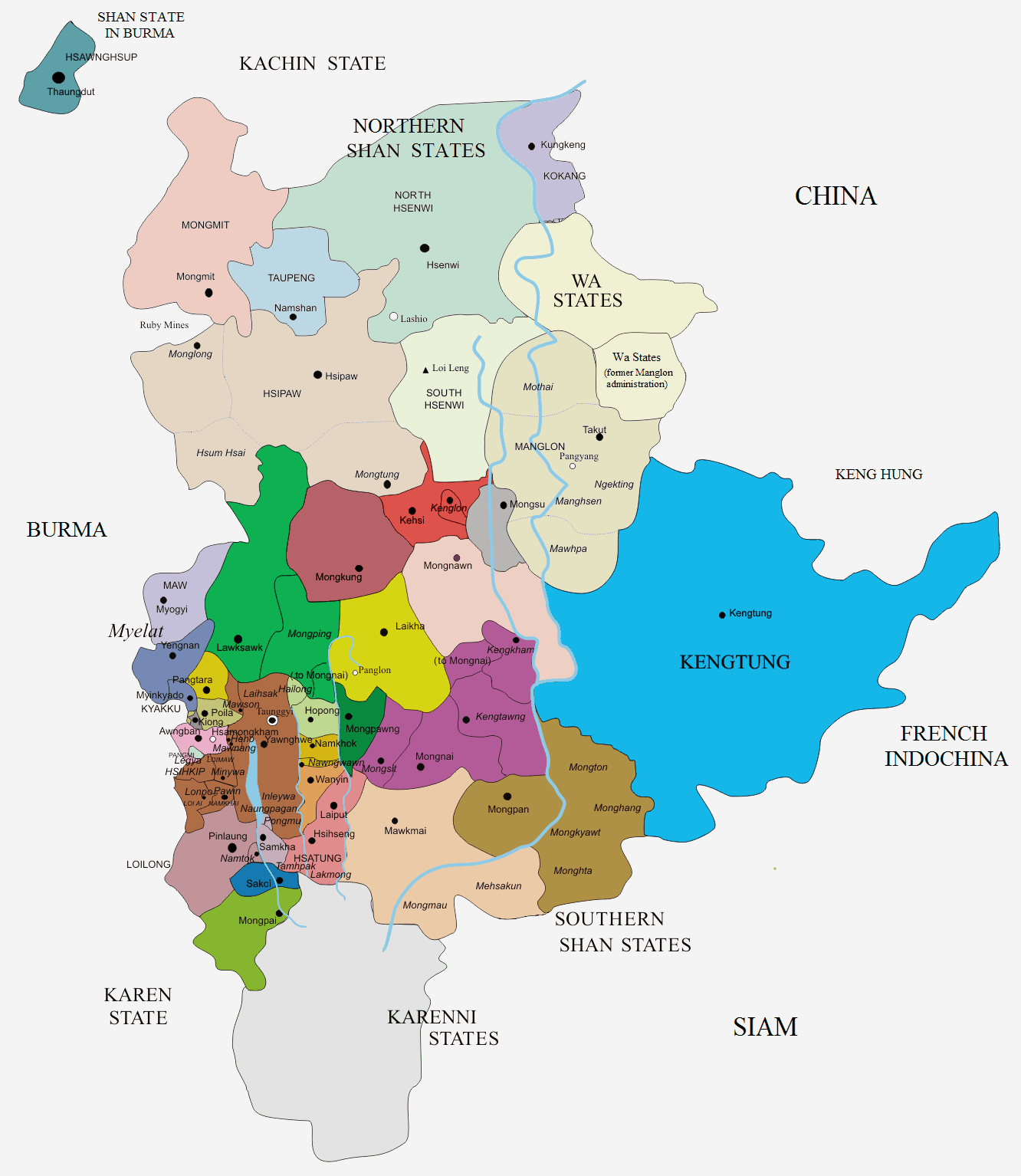
- North Hsenwi in a map of the Shan States
- Area
  - 1901: 6,330 km^{2} (2,440 sq mi)
- Population
  - 1901: 118,325
- History
  - Hsenwi split into two states: 1888
  - Abdication of the last ruler: 1959
Preceded by	Succeeded by
Hsenwi	Shan State

North Hsenwi was a Shan state in the Northern Shan States in what is today Burma. The capital was Lashio town which was also the headquarters of the superintendent of the Northern Shan State. North Hsenwi, with an area of 6330 m², had a population in 1901 of 118,325 persons and an estimated revenue of £6000.

== History ==
Sivirattha, the predecessor state, was founded before 650 AD according to tradition. This legendary state became Hsenwi State with the passing of the centuries. Hsenwi was by far the largest of the cis-Salween Shan states, and at one time included not only all the territory of the present states of North and South Hsenwi, but also Kehsi Mansam, Mong Hsu, Mong Sang, and Mong Nawng, besides having a sort of protectorate over Mang Lon and other Wa states east of the Salween. These had, however, fallen away in Burmese times, and before the annexation following British rule in Burma, Hsenwi was divided into five parts by name; but there was no central authority, and chaos prevailed all over the state.

After the pacification of the region in March 1888, the British colonial administration divided Hsenwi into two states: North Hsenwi and South Hsenwi. The first ruler of North Hsenwi was Hkun Sang, a successful adventurer from Ton Hong.

The last ruler of North Hsenwi abdicated in 1959. The state became part of Shan State and, despite the independence struggle of the latter, eventually part of Burma.

Sao Nang Hearn Kham the Mahadevi of Yawnghwe, wife of the last Saopha of Yawhghwe Sao Shwe Thaik, was the daughter of Saopha Hkun Hsang Ton Hong.

=== Rulers ===
The rulers of North Hsenwi bore the title Saopha.

==== Saophas ====
- Mar 1888 - Dec 1915 Hkun Hsang Ton Hong (s.a.)
- Jul 1927 - 1952 Sao Hom Hpa (b. 1906 - d. ....)
