= Kenglon =

Former Shan State in Burma

Coordinates: 21°57′0″N 98°8′0″E

Kenglon State
- State of the Shan States
- 1857–1926
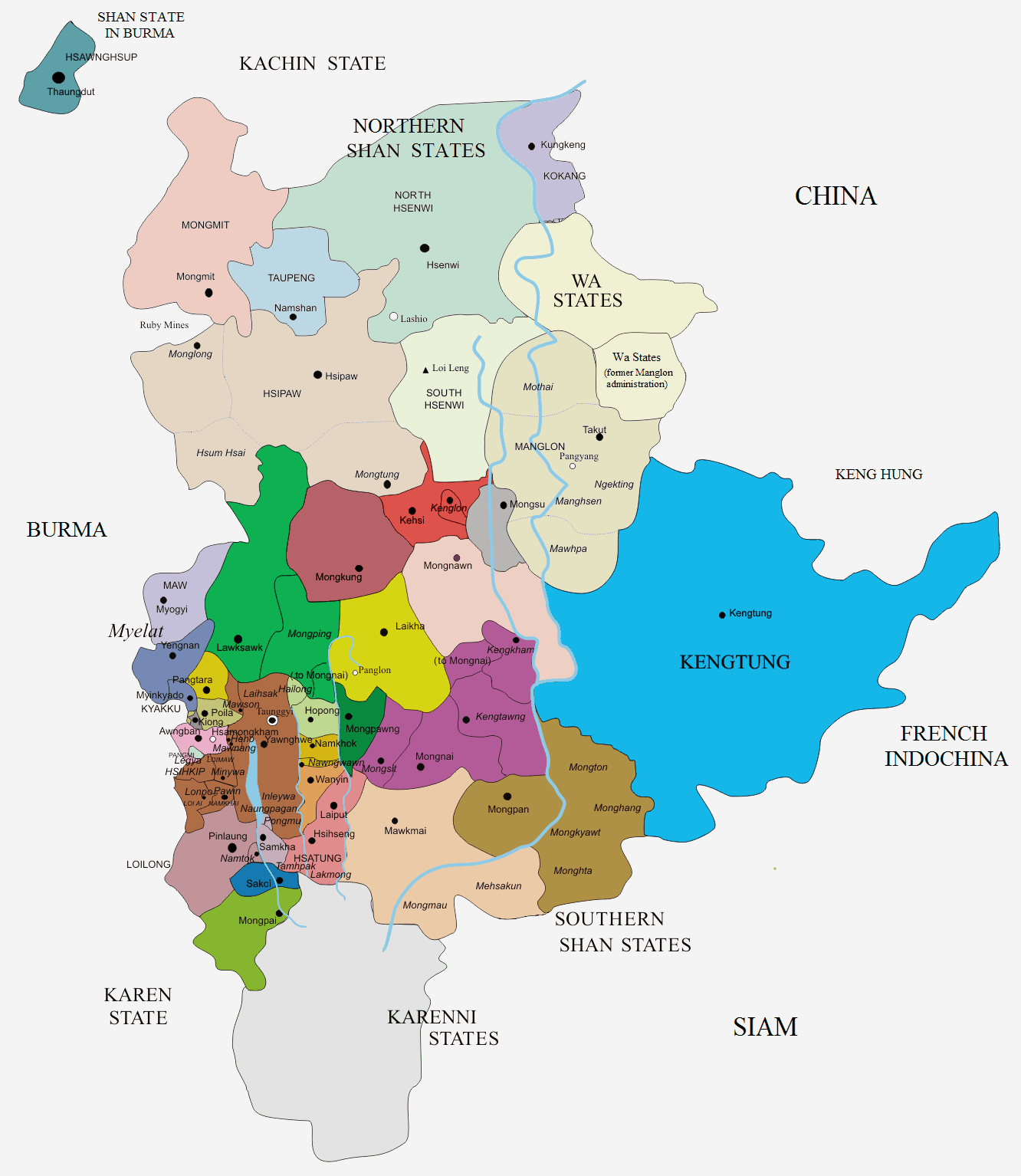
- Kenglon State in a map of the Shan States
- Capital: Keng Lon
- Area
  - 1901: 111.3 km^{2} (43.0 sq mi)
- Population
  - 1901: 4,259
- History
  - Independent from Hsenwi: 1857
  - Merged into Kehsi Mansam: 1926
Preceded by	Succeeded by
North Hsenwi	Kehsi Mansam

Kenglon (also spelt Kenglön), also known as Kyainglun (Burmese: ကျိုင်းလွန်း) was a small Shan state in what is today Burma.

== History ==
Kenglon used to be a part of North Hsenwi. It became independent from the state of Hsenwi in 1857. It was a tributary of Burma until 1887, when the Konbaung dynasty fell to the United Kingdom and the Shan states submitted to British rule.

In 1926 Kenglon State was incorporated into Kehsi Mansam.

=== Rulers ===
The rulers of the state bore the title Myoza.

- 1857 - 1873 Maung Pwin (Hkun Pwin) (d. 1873)
- 1873 - 1874 Naw Hkam U
- 1874 - 1885 Hkun Tawa
- 1885 - 1888 Hkun Tawn (b. c.1842 - d. ....)
- 1888 - c.1926 Hkun Mong (b. 1844 - d. 19..)

== See also ==
- Hsenwi
