= Möng Nawng =

Former Shan State in Myanmar

Coordinates: 21°30′N 98°20′E

- State of the Shan States
- 1851–1959
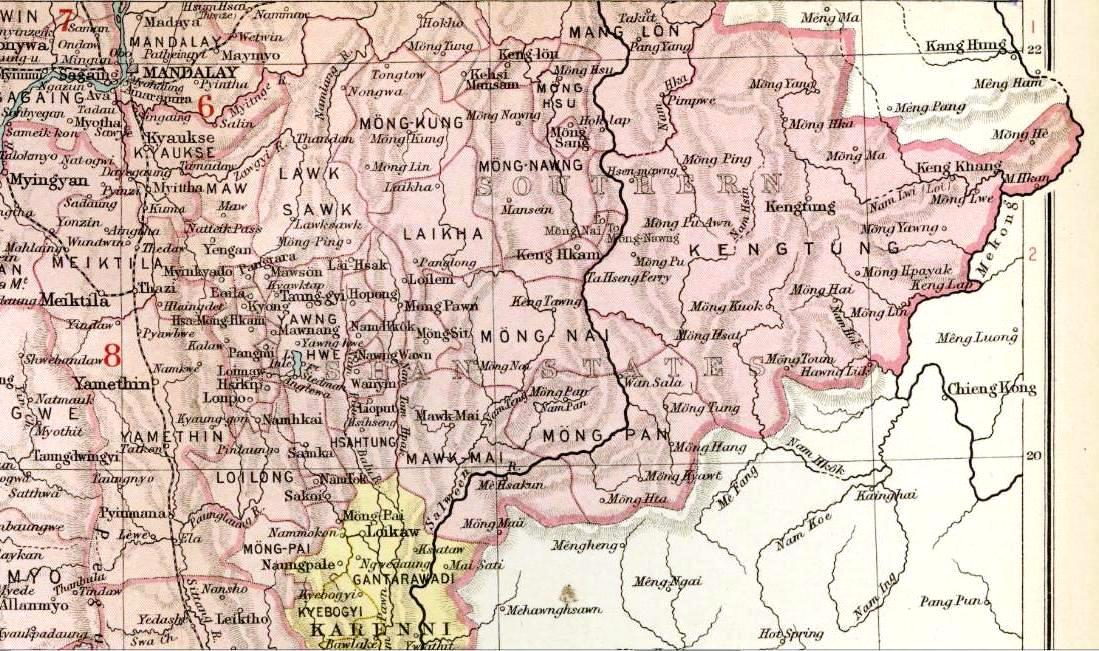
- Möng Nawng in an Imperial Gazetteer of India map
- Area
  - 1901: 4,079 km^{2} (1,575 sq mi)
- Population
  - 1901: 39,102
- History
  - Independence from Hsenwi State: 1851
  - Abdication of the last Myoza: 1959
Preceded by	Succeeded by
Hsenwi State	Shan State

Möng Nawng was a Shan state in what is modern-day Myanmar.

Möng Nawng was bound by Kengtung State in the east. The Nam Pang, an important river, crossed the state from north to south. Its capital was Mong Nawng.

== History ==
Möng Nawng became independent from Hsenwi in 1851 under the rulership of the myoza Heng Awn. It was a tributary of the Burmese Kingdom until 1887, when the Shan states submitted to British rule after the fall of the Konbaung dynasty. In British Burma, Mong Nawng was the capital of Möng Nawng, one of the large Shan States. The town had a population of 693 in 1901.

=== Rulers ===
The rulers of Möng Nawng bore the title of Myoza.

==== Myozas ====
- 1851 - 1866 Heng Awn (d. 1866)
- 1866 - 1868 Hkun Hkang (d. 1868)
- 1868 - 9 Aug 1906 Hkun Tun (b. 1858 - d. 1906)
- 9 Aug 1906 - 19.. Hkun Long (b. 1851 - d. 19..)
