= Mong Hsu Township =

Mong Hsu မိုင်းရှူးမြို့နယ်
- Township
- Mong Shu
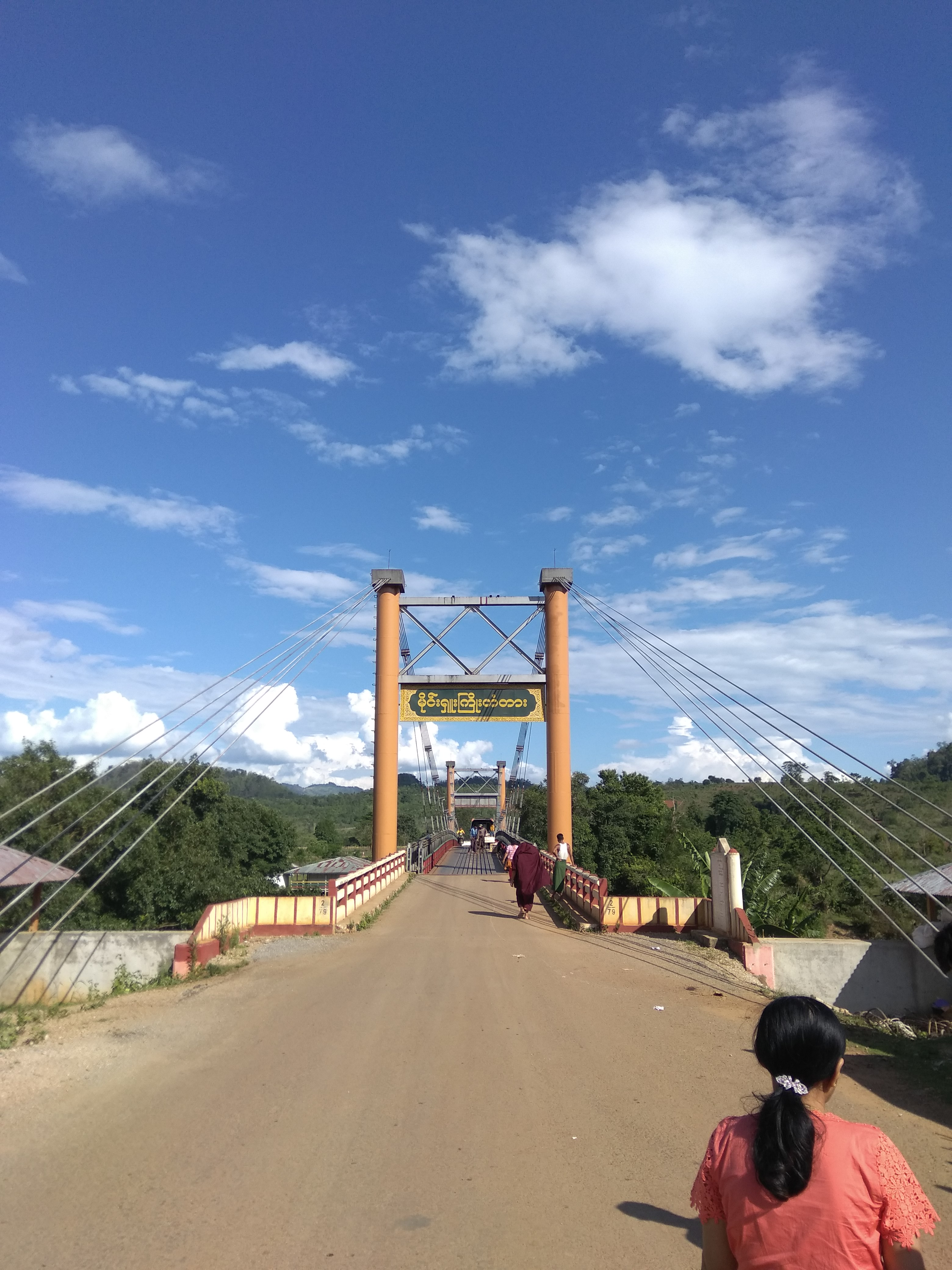

- Location in Monghsu district
- Coordinates: 21°54′20″N 98°21′10″E
- Country: Myanmar
- State: Shan State
- District: Mong Hsu District
- Capital: Mong Hsu
- Elevation: 707 m (2,320 ft)
- Time zone: UTC+6.30 (MMT)

Mong Hsu Township (Burmese: မိုင်းရှူးမြို့နယ်, officially Mong Shu Township) is a township of Mong Hsu District in central Shan State, Myanmar. The principal town is Mong Hsu.

Om-pu waterfall on Nam Parng River of Mong Hsu is the second largest waterfall of Shan State. The nearest commercial airport to Mong Hsu is Lashio Airport. The township is home to Haipa Waterfall, a prominent local attraction.

== History ==
Mong Hsu is the home of the famous Mong Hsu ruby mines. The large scale production started in 1991. Before gems were found, it is a small remote town with 1-2 convoys for each month. And before 1959, it was governed by a sawbwa.

The quality of its rubies are contested by dealers of precious rubies originating from Mogok.

There was forced displacement of native Shan population in Mong Hsu Township by the Myanmar Army in 1995. And several skirmishes between Myanmar Army and Shan State Army in 2011.

Beginning on 6 October 2015 a large scale offensive by the Tatmadaw comprising 20 Burma Army battalions has been launched in central Shan State. The aim of the military is to seize Shan ceasefire territories in Kehsi, Mong Hsu, Mong Nawng and Tangyan townships, using heavy artillery and with fighter jet and helicopter gunship air support to indiscriminately shell and bomb civilian areas. These attacks have displaced thousands of Shan, Palaung, Lisu and Lahu people causing a new humanitarian crisis.

== Towns and villages ==
- Ha-lin
- Hangna
- Hathka-ha
- Hawnglük
- Hkōngtawng
- Hkong-yom
- Ho-hseng
- Ho-kwai
- Hpa-ya
- Hsai-leng
- Hsonhkawn
- Hwè-hoi
- Hwè-long
- Kēng Hkam
- Kio-yan
- Konke
- Loi Na Hpai
- Loi-pwe
- Makwan
- Mān Kawngmu
- Mān Kyawng
- Möng Awt
- Möng Hkang
- Möng Hsu
- Möng Sang
- Nā-hsam
- Na-kaw
- Na-kawtkon
- Na-lao
- Nam-ang
- Namhsawm
- Namkat
- Nampa-lam
- Nā-wi
- Nawnghkio
- Nawnghkit
- Nawnghsan
- Nawngkawng
- Nawngleng (21°54'0"N 98°15'0"E)
- Nawngleng (21°42'0"N 98°13'0"E)
- Nawngpat
- Nawngpu
- Nawngtaw
- Nawngyau
- Pangnang
- Pangwet
- Panhwè
- Pengkawk
- Pingleng
- Pu-lüng
- Tā Hkè
- Tā Makkeng
- Tawmawn
- Wān Hai-hawm
- Wān Hak (21°57'0"N 98°18'0"E)
- Wān Hak (21°46'0"N 98°16'0"E)
- Wān Hkamkun
- Wān Ho-lao
- Wān Ho-nam
- Wān Ho-pong
- Wān Hpa
- Wān Hpakha
- Wān Hsai-leng
- Wān Hsan
- Wān Hsangkan
- Wān Hsaw
- Wān Hwi-long
- Wān Kat
- Wān Katkap
- Wān Kongkat
- Wān Kongkaw (21°50'0"N 98°15'0"E)
- Wān Kongkaw (21°37'0"N 98°30'0"E)
- Wān Kutlong
- Wān Li
- Wān Loi-long
- Wān Loi-tang
- Wān Loi-yai
- Wān Lokmawn
- Wān Longwai
- Wān Makhpüng
- Wān Makma
- Wān Maü
- Wān Mawmè
- Wān Möng (21°52'0"N 98°26'0"E)
- Wān Möng (21°39'0"N 98°17'0"E)
- Wān Na-aw
- Wān Nā-hka
- Wān Na-hong
- Wān Na-hsan
- Wān Na-kang
- Wān Nā-king
- Wān Na-lin
- Wān Na-maü
- Wān Nā-mawn
- Wān Namhsak
- Wān Namhu
- Wān Namkum
- Wān Namnat
- Wān Nampa-möng
- Wān Nampawn
- Wān Namtawng (21°50'0"N 98°25'0"E)
- Wān Namtawng (21°48'0"N 98°12'0"E)
- Wān Nam-wak
- Wān Na-noi
- Wān Na-pang
- Wān Na-pè
- Wān Nā-pong
- Wān Pak
- Wān Pang
- Wān Pa-nga
- Wān Panghkam (21°45'0"N 98°12'0"E)
- Wān Panghkam (21°44'0"N 98°32'0"E)
- Wān Panghkawm
- Wān Pānghōng
- Wān Panghsoi
- Wān Pāngleng
- Wān Pāngsa-li
- Wān Pa-ning
- Wān Pè
- Wān Sin
- Wān Ta-nging
- Wān Tūnpūng
- Wān Ünhson
- Wān Wo-long
