= Hsenwi Palace =

Palace in Shan State, Myanmar

- သိန္နီဟော်နန်း
- Interactive map of the Hsenwi Palace area

General information
- Location: Theinni, Shan State, Myanmar
- Coordinates: 23.299°N 97.963°E
- Completed: 1911

Hsenwi Palace, also known as the Hsenwi Haw (Shan: ႁေႃသႅၼ်ဝီ) or Theinni Haw (Burmese: သိန္နီဟော်နန်း), is the former residence of the local ruler of Hsenwi State when it was a principality in modern-day Burma (now Myanmar).

== History ==
Hsenwi state is traditionally regarded as the first Shan state, with its founding predating 650 AD. In the 19th century, Hsenwi was the largest of the cis-Salween Shan states.

Construction of Hsenwi Palace began in 1910, based on the design of Mandalay Palace by Khun Hsang Tone Hung, the saopha of Hsenwi State. In 1916, Sao Nang Hearn Kham was born in the palace. During World War II, aerial bombings destroyed the palace in April 1944.

Following the 1962 Burmese coup d'état, the palace grounds were used as a military camp. Ownership of the palace was transferred to Hsenwi's Shan Literature and Culture Committee in 1981.

In February 2017, the Burmese government announced plans to rebuild a replica of Hsenwi Palace. Construction of the replica, located 63 feet (19 m) left of the old palace site, began on 5 December 2019. The groundbreaking was held on 5 December 2020, and the palace was re-opened on 11 April 2023 as a museum.
