= Kyethi =

Kyethi ကျေးသိးမြို့
- Town
- Location within Myanmar
- Coordinates: 21.93°N 97.8218°E
- Country: Myanmar
- State: Shan State
- District: Mong Hsu District
- Township: Kyethi Township
- Time zone: UTC+6:30 (MMT)

Kyethi (Shan: ဝဵင်းၵေႇသီႇ;Burmese: ကျေးသီးမြို့) (Kyethi or Kehsi) is the main town of Kyethi Township, Mong Hsu District, in the Shan State of Burma. The main town is Kesi (Kyethi or Kehsi). Highway 442 passes through Kyethi town.

== History ==
Kehsi, located by the Nam Heng River, was the capital of Kehsi Mansam, one of the Shan States. It had a population of 618 in 1901.
