= Möng Hsu =

Former Shan State in Burma

Coordinates: 21°48′N 98°21′E

- State of the Shan States in personal union with Möng Sang
- 1857–1959
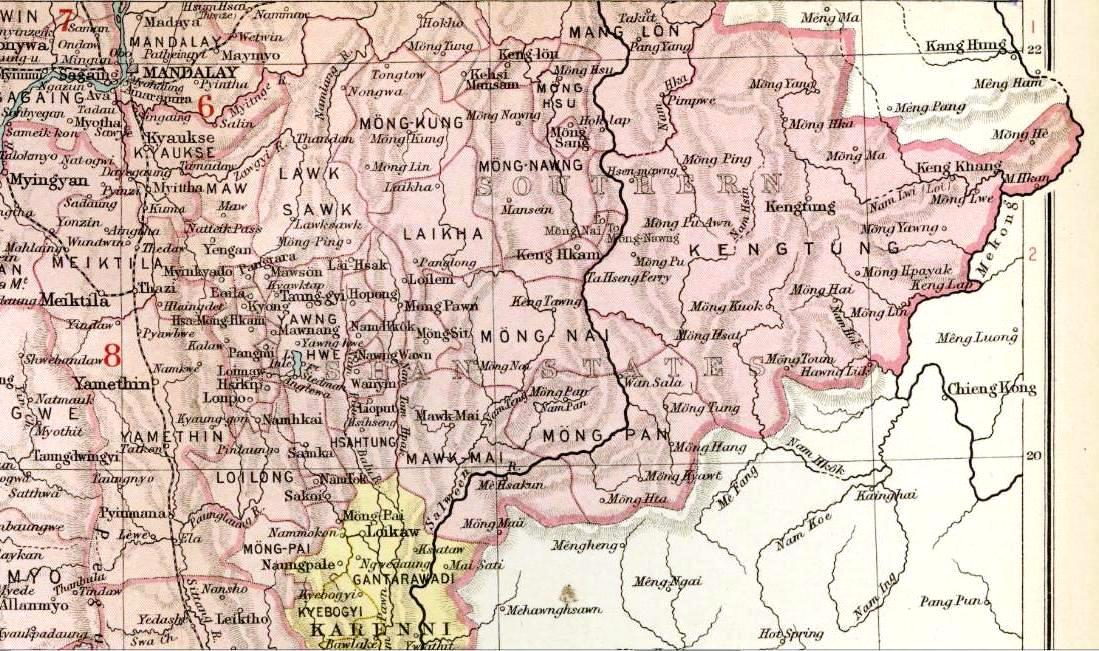
- Möng Hsu in an Imperial Gazetteer of India map
- Area
  - 1901: 425 km^{2} (164 sq mi)
- Population
  - 1901: 17,480
- History
  - State founded: 1857
  - Abdication of the last Myoza: 1959
Preceded by	Succeeded by
Hsenwi State	Shan State

Möng Hsu or Maingshu was a Shan state in what is today Burma. It belonged to the Eastern Division of the Southern Shan States. The main river in the area was the Nam Pang.

== History ==
Möng Hsu became independent from Hsenwi in 1857 under a personal union with the neighbouring state of Möng Sang. It was a tributary of Burma until 1887, when the Shan states submitted to British rule after the fall of the Konbaung dynasty. The residence of the Myoza was at Mong Hsu.

=== Rulers ===
The rulers of Möng Hsu/Möng Sang bore the title of Myoza, "duke" or chief of town.

==== Myozas ====
- 1857 - 1879 Hkun Mon
- 1879 - 1901 Hkun Maha
- 1901 - 1917 Hkun Kyaw (b. 1845 - d. 1917)
- 1917 - 19.. Hkun Sao (Hkun Saw) (b. 1845 - d. 19..)
