= Haipa Waterfall =

Waterfall in Shan State, Myanmar

- တၢတ်ႇႁၢႆးပႃ; ဟိုက်ပါရေတံခွန်
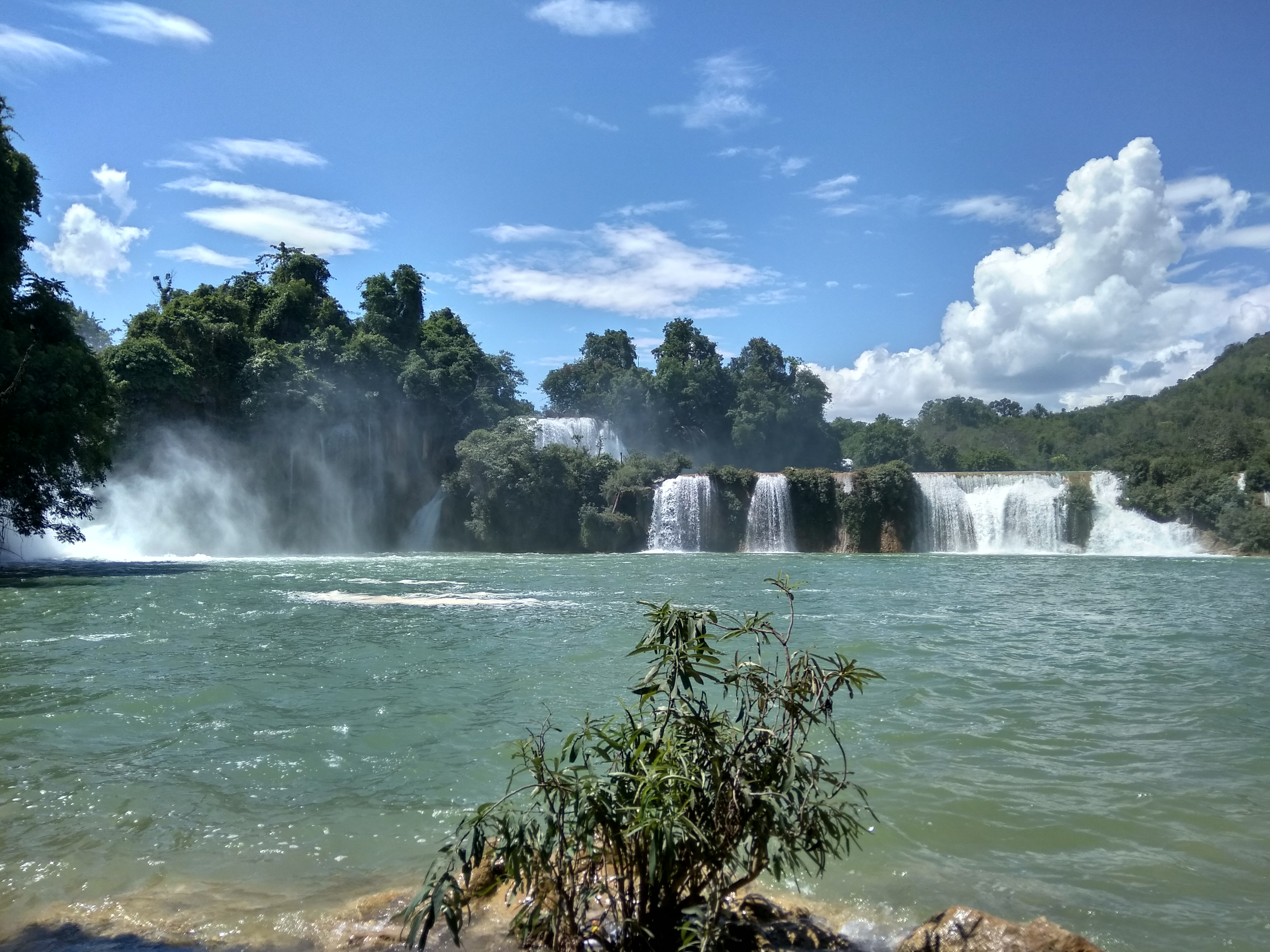
- First level of Haipa Waterfall
- Interactive map of Haipa Waterfall
- Location: Mong Hsu Township, Shan State, Myanmar
- Coordinates: 21.793°N 98.319°E

Haipa Waterfall (Shan: တၢတ်ႇႁၢႆးပႃ, Burmese: ဟိုက်ပါရေတံခွန်) is a waterfall located in the village of Haipa Ywama, in Mong Hsu Township, southern Shan State, Myanmar.

The waterfall is a tiered waterfall with seven to nine steps at various points. Near the waterfall is a related fall called Haipu Waterfall, whose tiers form safely swimmable pools.

== Tourism ==
The Haipa Waterfall is closed for the monsoon season from May to November. There are guesthouses and restaurants built around the area to serve tourists. The waterfall sees hundreds of visitors on weekends and public holidays, with peaks reaching into the thousands during the summer holidays in March and the Thingyan festival in April. There are also boat services that take tourists closer to the water. Other reports state that the waterfall is only closed for one month during the monsoon.

The waterfall can be accessed by road, primarily via the Taunggyi-Keng Tung road. The waterfall is about 58 miles from the Shan state capital of Taunggyi and 32 miles from the nearby towns of Panglong and Loilem. The nearest town is Mong Hsu, twelve miles away, though most visitors arrive from the west turning towards the waterfall without visiting Mong Hsu. The roads leading to the area are all asphalt roads and create easy transportation connections for visitors from any direction.

Tourism in the 2010s led to issues of pollution and littering at the waterfall. The village of Haipa Ywama did not have large restaurants or accommodation, leading to many people to eat at temporary food stalls near the waterfall, or picnic without proper trash disposal systems. By 2020, makeshift guest houses and tourist infrastructure were built near the waterfall.

Starting in January 2024, due to increased fighting nearby during the Myanmar civil war between the Pa-O National Liberation Army and Tatmadaw-aligned forces, tourism dropped to practically zero. By December 2024, tourism picked back up at the waterfalls, as the situation on the Taunggyi-Mong Hsu road became more stable. Visitors also returned after a missionary trip by a prominent monk in January 2025, whose visit signalled to his followers that the road was safe.
