= Hkam Yawt Hpa of Hsenwi =

Hkam Yawt Hpa

Sawbwa of Hsenwi
- Reign: c. April 1412 – 1444/45
- Predecessor: Hkam Hkai
- Successor: Hkam Wat
- Emperor: Yongle Emperor
- Born: ? Hsenwi State
- Died: 1444/45; 806 ME; Hsenwi State
- Issue: Hkam Wat; Nang Han Hkön Saw
- Father: Hkam Hkai

Hkam Yawt Hpa (Burmese: ခမ်းယော့ဘွား, Burmese pronunciation: [kʰáɰ̃ jɔ̬ bwá]; d. 1444/45) was sawbwa of Hsenwi (in present-day northern Shan State, Myanmar) from 1412 to 1444/45. As a vassal of Ming China, he participated in the Ava–Hanthawaddy War (1408–1418).

== Early life ==
According to the Hsenwi Yazawin, Hkam Yawt was the middle son of Prince Hkam Hkai Hpa of Hsenwi. He had an older brother, Hkam Hawt; a younger brother, Hkam Lat; and at least one sister. (Note: See (Scott 1899: 244) for his older and younger brothers. He also had at least one sister since the royal chronicles say the sawbwa of Hsenwi [Hkam Hkai Hpa] invaded Ava alongside his son and his son-in-law.)

Despite being the middle son, Hkam Yawt became the heir apparent to the Hsenwi throne after his father became sawbwa of the Shan-speaking state in 1407/08. Hsenwi was then a tributary state under Ming China. (Note: Hsenwi (木邦, Mùbāng) was a fǔ (府, prefecture)—one of the three prefectures created out of the former domains of Mong Mao by the Ming.) His two brothers Hkam Hawt and Hkam Lat were given smaller districts to govern—Wing Hkum, and Kung Ma, respectively. Hkam Yawt likely participated in his father's invasion of Ava in 1412 although the chronicles do not explicitly name him. (Note: The main chronicles only say that the sawbwa of Hsenwi, his son and his son-in-law led the invasion. They do not provide any specific names.)

== Sawbwa of Hsenwi ==
Hkam Yawt succeeded the Hsenwi throne c. April 1412 after his father fell in action during the invasion. He spent his first months, until November, defending the Hsenwi fortress which was under siege by Crown Prince Minye Kyawswa of Ava. The sawbwa requested military assistance from Yunnan. However, the Chinese relief force which arrived only in October was defeated by Ava forces. The siege only ended when King Razadarit of Hanthawaddy opened a new southern front in November, and Minye Kyawswa's forces were redirected to the southern front.

As a Chinese vassal, Hkam Yawt continued to execute China's Ava policy. He participated in subsequent Chinese-sponsored attacks into northern Ava. According to the Ming Shilu, Hsenwi forces raided Ava's northern territories, destroying "over 20 cities and stockades." The Hsenwi delegation presented the captured elephants, horses, and other goods at the Chinese capital in September 1413. Hkam Yawt also continued the alliance with King Razadarit of Hanthawaddy whom China had recognized as a vassal. In 1413, Razadarit sent an embassy to Hsenwi carrying seven viss (11.43 kg) of gold to keep Hsenwi in the war.

However, when China later shifted its focus to its protracted conflict in Đại Việt, Hkam Yawt recalibrated his Ava policy. Hsenwi may have reached a ceasefire agreement with Ava as early as 1416, followed by a peace treaty in 1418/19. (Note: According to the Hsenwi Yazawin, Hsenwi signed a peace treaty with Ava in 780 ME (1418/19). Another source, as reported by historians Sai Kam Mong and Luang Tha Aye, says the sawbwa of Hsenwi surrendered in 1416, after eight years of war with Ava.)

Hkam Yawt moved the capital to Wing Leng. He ruled until 1444/45, and was succeeded by his son Hkam Wat. According to the Hsenwi Yazawin, Hkam Yawt's daughter Nang Han Hkön Saw was "carried off and married by the King of the Nagas."

== Bibliography ==
- Fernquest, Jon (Autumn 2006). "Crucible of War: Burma and the Ming in the Tai Frontier Zone (1382–1454)" (PDF). SOAS Bulletin of Burma Research. 4 (2). Archived (PDF) from the original on 2017-08-10.
- Goh, Geok Yian (2009). Connecting and Distancing: Southeast Asia and China. Institute of Southeast Asian. ISBN 9789812308566.
- Harvey, G. E. (1925). History of Burma: From the Earliest Times to 10 March 1824. London: Frank Cass & Co. Ltd.
- Kala, U (2006) [1724]. Maha Yazawin (in Burmese). Vol. 1–3 (4th printing ed.). Yangon: Ya-Pyei Publishing.
- Maha Sithu (2012) [1798]. Myint Swe; Kyaw Win; Thein Hlaing (eds.). Yazawin Thit (in Burmese). Vol. 1–3 (2nd printing ed.). Yangon: Ya-Pyei Publishing.
- Phayre, Arthur P. (1967) [1883]. History of Burma. London: Susil Gupta.
- Royal Historical Commission of Burma (2003) [1832]. Hmannan Yazawin (in Burmese). Vol. 1–3. Yangon: Ministry of Information, Myanmar.
- Scott, James George; Hardiman, John Percy (1899). Gazetteer of Upper Burma and the Shan States. Vol. 1. Rangoon: Government Printing, Burma.

Hkam Yawt Hpa of Hsenwi Mong Mao (Maw) Died: 1444/45
Preceded by Hkam Hkai	Sawbwa of Hsenwi c. April 1412 – 1444/45	Succeeded by Hkam Wat
