= Hkam Hkai Hpa of Hsenwi =

15th-century sawbwa of Hsenwi

Hkam Hkai Hpa

Sawbwa of Hsenwi
- Reign: 1407/08 – c. April 1412
- Predecessor: Hkam Pöt
- Successor: Hkam Yawt
- Emperor: Yongle Emperor
- Died: c. April 1412; Wetwin, Ava Kingdom
- Issue: Hkam Hawt; Hkam Yawt; Hkam Lat; (unnamed daughter)
- Father: Hkam Pöt

Sao Long Hkam Hkai Hpa (Note: Burmese: စလုံ ခမ်းခိုင်ဘွား, written as စဝ်လုံ ခမ်းခိုင်ဘွား in modern Burmese, pronounced [səlòʊɰ̃ kʰáɰ̃ kʰàiɰ̃ bwá].) (d. 1412) was sawbwa of Hsenwi (in present-day northeastern Myanmar) from 1407/08 to 1412. A loyal vassal of Ming China, the sawbwa led a Chinese-supported expedition against Ava in 1412 during the Ava–Hanthawaddy War (1408–1418). He was killed in action during the campaign.

== Early life ==
According to the Hsenwi Yazawin chronicle, Sao Long Hkam Hkai Hpa was born Hkun Nkam Hung into the ruling family of Hsenwi. At the time, Hsenwi was a Shan-speaking tributary state under Ming China. (Note: Hsenwi (木邦, Mùbāng) was a fǔ (府, prefecture)—one of three prefectures created out of the former domains of Mong Mao by the Ming.) Nkam Hung's father, Sao Hkun Hkam Pöt, became the sawbwa (chief) of the Shan state in 1405/06. When his father died two years later in 1407/08, Nkam Hung, as the elder son, (Note: Hkun Hkam Pöt had a younger son, Hkun Hkam Wat.) succeeded the throne, taking the title of Sao Long Hkam Hkai Hpa.

== Sawbwa of Hsenwi ==
=== Relations with Ava ===
Hkam Hkai Hpa came to power during a period of significant geopolitical turmoil in the Shan states. The Irrawaddy valley-based Kingdom of Ava (present day central Myanmar) had recently expanded into the Shan Hills. By his accession in 1407/08, the Burmese-speaking kingdom had reached Hsenwi's border, having recently conquered Onbaung Hsipaw (1404/05), Yatsauk and Nyaungshwe (1405/06), and Bhamo and Mohnyin (1406). Meanwhile, China, which considered the Shan states its tributaries, was focused on a major rebellion in Đại Việt (present-day northern Vietnam), and had done little to stop Ava's expansion. Though the Ming court warned Ava in 1406 to cease its "aggression" in the Shan states, in reality, it actually withdrew troops from Yunnan to support the Đại Việt campaign the same year.

According to the Hsenwi Yazawin chronicle, relations with Ava deteriorated to open hostilities by 1409 when Ava made two incursions into Hsenwi territory. (Note: The hostilities may have started as early as 1408.: The Hsenwi Yazawin says Ava "invaded" Hsenwi twice in 771 ME (1409/10)—first by the lord of Pagan, and another by the lord of Pagan and "King" [sic] Minye Kyawswa.; According to Sai Kam Mong and Luang Tha Aye, the sawbwa of Hsenwi surrendered in 1416 [1416/17], after eight years of war with Ava, meaning the conflict started c. 1408/09.) However, the main Burmese chronicles—the Maha Yazawin, Yazawin Thit, Hmannan Yazawin—report no such military campaigns. Instead, they note that King Minkhaung I ordered conscriptions from all his vassals, including the Ava-held Shan states, for the 1409–1410 dry season campaign against Hanthawaddy. Ming records state that the sawbwa dispatched a delegation to Beijing to request military assistance. The mission was received on 5 September 1409, and the Ming court was receptive. Encouraged by recent success in Đại Việt, the Yongle Emperor sent a eunuch delegate to Hsenwi, promising a punitive expedition against Ava.

=== Invasion of Ava and death ===
Hkam Hkai Hpa ultimately led the punitive expedition although planning required two more years. The Ming court took steps to build a coalition: it recognized King Razadarit of Hanthawaddy as a Chinese tributary ruler—Razadarit had been fighting Ava since 1408, and by August 1411, it had secured an alliance with the powerful Shan state of Mong Mao (Maw). For his part, Hkam Hkai Hpa reinforced his capital's defenses, having moved the seat of government from Mong Keng to Wing Hkam Kai, north of Se-U (Se-Au), in 1408/09.

Circa April 1412, Hkam Hkai Hpa's expeditionary force invaded Hsipaw, an Ava vassal state situated approximately 120 kilometers southwest of Hsenwi. They met minimal resistance. Hsipaw's sawbwa, Tho Kyaung Bwa, immediately fled to Ava. Hsenwi forces pressed on through the Shan Hills towards Ava (Inwa), located about 220 kilometers southwest of Hsipaw. However, the Hsenwi army encountered the northern Ava army commanded by Crown Prince Minye Kyawswa near Wetwin, about 80 km from Ava. The sawbwa was killed in the battle, and most of the surviving Hsenwi forces retreated. The battle resulted in the deaths of about 300 Hsenwi troops; an additional 800 troops, 200 horses, and six elephants were captured.

== Aftermath ==
Following Hkam Hkai Hpa's death, his son and his son-in-law led the remaining troops back to Hsenwi. Minye Kyawswa pursued them, and laid siege to Hsenwi's fortified capital. The Hsenwi fortress was well provisioned, and held out through the entire rainy season. Chinese military help arrived five months into the siege, but Ava forces ambushed the Chinese troops as they approached Hsenwi. The siege lasted another month until November 1412 when Razadarit opened a new southern front.

Hkam Hkai Hpa was succeeded by his middle son, Hkam Yawt. The new sawbwa continued to partake in the subsequent Chinese attacks into northern Ava. He signed a peace treaty with Ava in 1418/19 (or 1416). (Note: According to the Hsenwi Yazawin, Hsenwi signed a peace treaty with Ava in 780 ME (1418/19). Another source, as reported by historians Sai Kam Mong and Luang Tha Aye, says the sawbwa of Hsenwi surrendered in 1416, after eight years of war with Ava.)

== Bibliography ==
- Fernquest, Jon (Autumn 2006). "Crucible of War: Burma and the Ming in the Tai Frontier Zone (1382–1454)" (PDF). SOAS Bulletin of Burma Research. 4 (2). Archived (PDF) from the original on 10 August 2017.
- Goh, Geok Yian (2009). Connecting and Distancing: Southeast Asia and China. Institute of Southeast Asian. ISBN 9789812308566.
- Harvey, G. E. (1925). History of Burma: From the Earliest Times to 10 March 1824. London: Frank Cass & Co. Ltd.
- Kala, U (2006) [1724]. Maha Yazawin (in Burmese). Vol. 1–3 (4th printing ed.). Yangon: Ya-Pyei Publishing.
- Maha Sithu (2012) [1798]. Myint Swe; Kyaw Win; Thein Hlaing (eds.). Yazawin Thit (in Burmese). Vol. 1–3 (2nd printing ed.). Yangon: Ya-Pyei Publishing.
- Royal Historical Commission of Burma (2003) [1832]. Hmannan Yazawin (in Burmese). Vol. 1–3. Yangon: Ministry of Information, Myanmar.
- Scott, James George; Hardiman, John Percy (1899). Gazetteer of Upper Burma and the Shan States. Vol. 1. Rangoon: Government Printing, Burma.

Hkam Hkai Hpa of Hsenwi Mong Mao (Maw) Died: c. April 1412
Preceded by Hkam Pöt	Sawbwa of Hsenwi; 1407/08 – c. April 1412	Succeeded by Hkam Yawt
