= Kehsi Mansam =

Former Shan State in Burma

Coordinates: 22°1′30″N 98°1′0″E

Kehsi Mansam (Kyithi Bansan)
- State of the Shan States
- 1857–1959
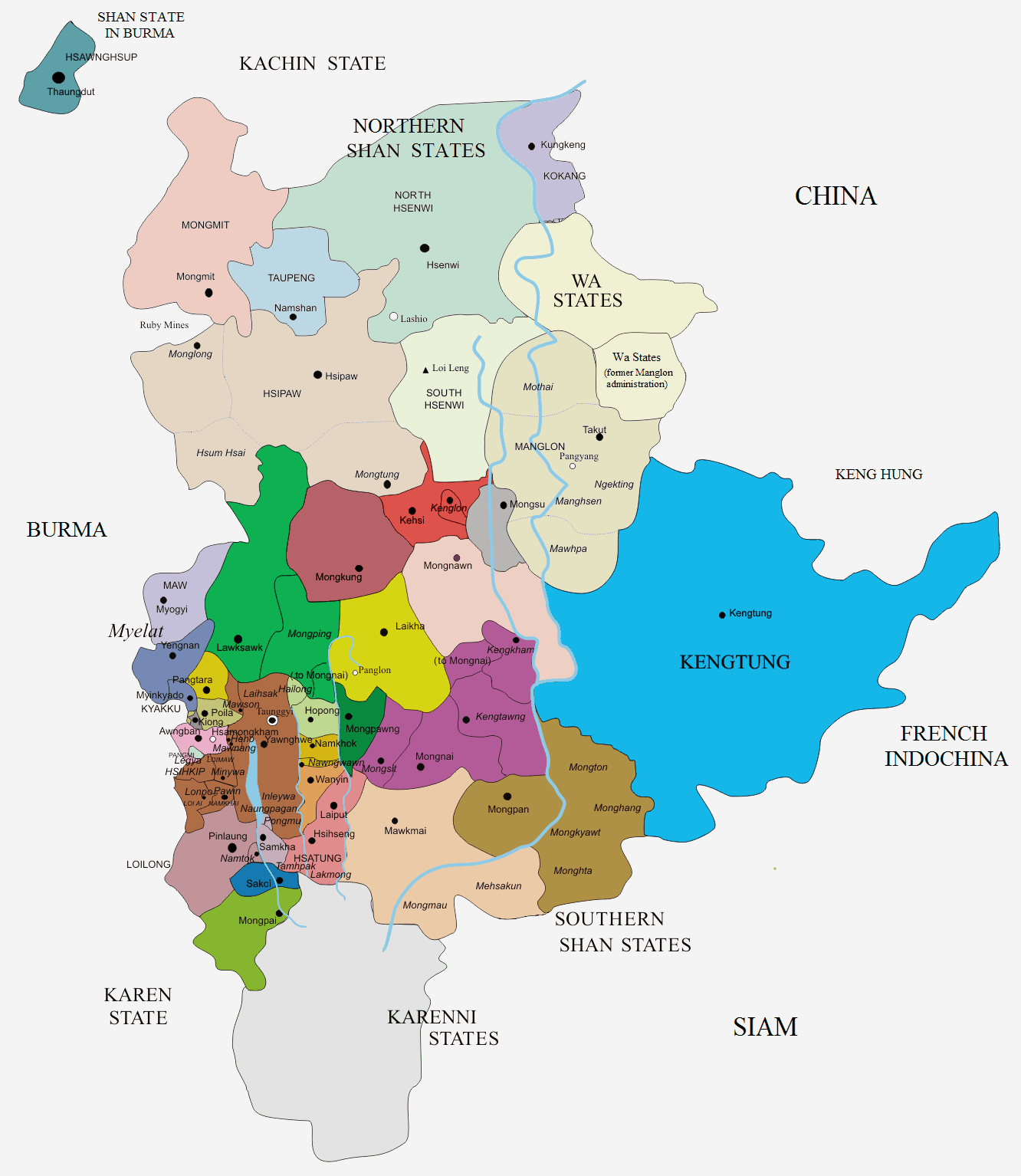
- Kehsi Mansam State in a map of the Shan States
- Capital: Kehsi
- Area
  - 1901: 1,017 km^{2} (393 sq mi)
- Population
  - 1901: 22,062
- History
  - Independent from Hsenwi: 1857
  - Abdication of the last Myoza: 1959
Preceded by	Succeeded by
Hsenwi State	Shan State

Kehsi Mansam (also known as Kehsi Mangam and as Kyithi Bansan) was a Shan state in what is today Myanmar. It belonged to the Eastern Division of the Southern Shan States. Its capital was Kehsi town, located by the Nam Heng River. The state included 378 villages and the population was mostly Shan, but there were also some Palaung people (Yins) in the area

== History ==
Kehsi Mansam became independent from Hsenwi in 1857. It was a tributary of Burma until 1887, when the Shan states submitted to British rule after the fall of the Konbaung dynasty.

Kehsi Mansam included the small substate of Kenglon (Kenglön), located in the southeastern part and almost totally encircled by Kehsi Mansam. In 1926 Kenglon State was incorporated into Kehsi Mansam.

=== Rulers ===
The rulers of the state bore the title Myoza.

- 1860 - 1881 Hkun Yawt
- 1881 - 1914 Hkun Yawt Hseng (b. 1844 - d. 1914)
- 1914 - 19.. Hkun Long (b. 1881 - d. 19..)
