= Kyethi Township =

Kyethi Township ကျေးသီးမြို့နယ် Kesi Township
- Township
- Location in Monghsu district
- Coordinates: 22°1′30″N 98°1′0″E
- Country: Myanmar
- State: Shan State
- District: Mong Hsu District
- Time zone: UTC+6:30 (MMT)

Kyethi Township (Burmese: ကျေးသီးမြို့နယ်, Burmese pronunciation: [tɕé.θí mjo̼.nɛ̀]) is a township of Mong Hsu District in the Shan State of Myanmar. The main town is Kyethi (also called Kesi or Kehsi).

== History ==
Beginning on 6 October 2015 a large scale offensive by the Tatmadaw comprising 20 Burma Army battalions has been launched in central Shan State. The aim of the military is to seize Shan ceasefire territories in Kehsi, Mong Nawng, Mong Hsu and Tangyan townships, using heavy artillery and with fighter jet and helicopter gunship air support to indiscriminately shell and bomb civilian areas. These attacks have displaced thousands of Shan, Palaung, Lisu and Lahu people causing a new humanitarian crisis.
