= Hangna =

Village in Shan State, Myanmar

- Unincorporated Community
- Location in Myanmar
- Country: Myanmar
- State: Shan State
- Elevation: 631 m (2,070 ft)

Hangna is a village in the Shan State of Myanmar. Hangna is close to the Salween River. The elevation of Hangna is 2,070 feet (630 metres).
