= Mong Nawng =

- Town
- Location in Myanmar
- Coordinates: 21.645°N 98.1230°E
- Country: Myanmar
- State: Shan State
- District: Mong Hsu District
- Township: Kyethi Township
- Subtownship: Mong Nawng Subtownship

Area
  - Total: 3.08 sq mi (8.0 km^{2})

Population (2019)
  - Total: 4,439
  - Density: 1,440/sq mi (556/km^{2})
- Time zone: UTC+6.30 (MMT)

Mong Nawng (Burmese: မိုင်းနောင်, romanized: Maing Naung) is a town in Shan State, Myanmar. It is located a few miles to the west of the Nam Pang river. It is the principal town of Mong Nawng Subtownship within the Kyethi Township of Mong Hsu District. It is subdivided into 5 urban wards numbered one through five.

== Etymology ==
The name "Mong Nawng" means "town near a lake" in Shan, and is transliterated into Burmese as Maing naung.

== History ==
In British Burma Mong Nawng was the capital of Möng Nawng, one of the large Shan States. The town had a population of 693 in 1901.

More recently the area has been ravaged by conflicts between the Shan State Army-South (SSA-S) and the Burmese Army.

Beginning on 6 October 2015 a large scale offensive by the Tatmadaw comprising 20 Burma Army battalions has been launched in central Shan State. The aim of the military is to seize Shan ceasefire territories in Kehsi, Mong Hsu townships, including Mong Nawng subtownship, using heavy artillery and with fighter jet and helicopter gunship air support to indiscriminately shell and bomb civilian areas. These attacks have displaced thousands of Shan, Palaung, Lisu and Lahu people causing a new humanitarian crisis.

Prior to 2022, the town was part of Loilen District before the formation of Mong Hsu District.
