= Theinni =

Theinni: သိန္နီ; သႅၼ်ဝီ; Hsenwi
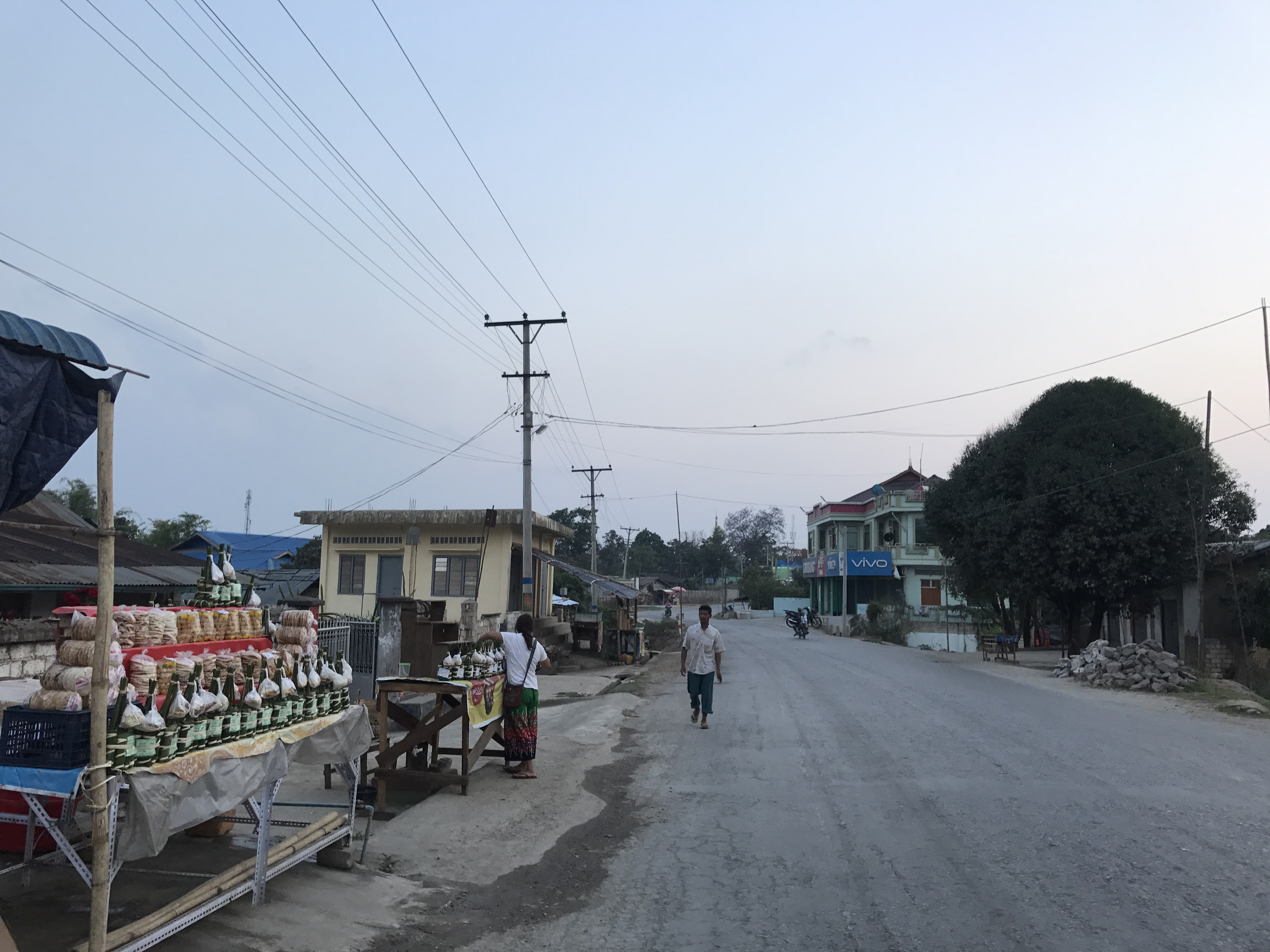

- Location in Myanmar
- Coordinates: 23°18′N 97°58′E
- Country: Myanmar
- State: Shan State
- District: Lashio District
- Township: Hsenwi Township

Area
  - City: 3.92 sq mi (10.15 km^{2})

Population (2019)
  - City: 9,392
  - Density: 2,397/sq mi (925.3/km^{2})
  - Metro: 55,938
  - Ethnicities: Shan; Kokang Chinese
  - Religions: Buddhism
- Time zone: UTC+6.30 (MST)

Theinni or Hsenwi (Shan: သႅၼ်ဝီ; Burmese: သိန္နီ, pronounced [θèiɰ̃nì]; Chinese: 木邦) is a town in northern Shan State of Burma, situated near the north bank of the Nam Tu River and now the centre of Hsenwi Township in Lashio District. It is 28 miles (45 km) north of Lashio and 2,100 feet (640 m) above sea level.

After the disruption of the Dali Kingdom by Kublai Khan, Theinni seems to have been the centre of the independent Shan princely states, with various capitals in the Shweli River and Nam Tu River valleys. This kingdom of Kawsampi was ended by the Burmese in 1738 (or thereabouts), and the country was divided into various states with appointment orders from Ava. Numerous rebellions and civil wars reduced Theinni from its position as arguably the most powerful and populous Shan state to what is perceived as a condition of fearful desolation. It later regained much population since the British occupation in 1888, but is still far from its old prosperity. The ruins of what was the old capital of Hsenwi State lie at a short distance, and show it to have been a large and well-built town.

It is de jure a part of Burma, but is currently controlled by the Brotherhood Alliance as of 30 October 2023 as a result of the 2021–2023 Myanmar civil war.

== History ==
=== Historical background ===
It was the capital of Hsenwi State, by far the largest of the cis-Salween Shan states, and at one time included not only all the territory of the present states of North and South Hsenwi, but also Kehsi Mansam, Mong Hsu, Mong Sang, and Mong Nawng, besides having a sort of protectorate over Mang Lon and other Wa states east of the Salween. These had, however, fallen away in Burmese times, and before the British annexation, Theinni was divided into five parts by name; but there was no central authority, and the whole state was in hopeless disorder. After the pacification of the region in March 1888, the colonial administration divided Theinni into two states: North Theinni, which was assigned to a successful adventurer, Hkun Sang, of Ton Hong, and South Theinni which went to Nawmong, of the old Shan ruling house. North Theinni with an area of 6,330 square metres (68,100 sq ft) had a population (1901) of 118,325 persons; estimated revenue, £6000. South Theinni with an area of 2,400 square metres (26,000 sq ft) had a population (in 1901) of 67,836; estimated revenue, £4800. Mong Yai was the capital of South Theinni, with a population of about 2000. Lashio, the headquarters of the superintendent of the Northern Shan State, is in North Theinni.

There were a total of 16 rulers in Hsenwi from 1778 to 1888.

The US Air Force attacked it several times during World War II.

Kokang was part of the Hsenwi Saopha territory before Myanmar's independence from the British.

=== Myanmar civil war ===
The town was captured by the Brotherhood Alliance during the ongoing Myanmar Civil War around 29 October 2023. It began to be administered by the MNDAA in April 2025 mandating Chinese language signage. Many shops and new construction projects were given to Chinese national businessmen coming into the town, the local currency became the Chinese yuan and local land was seized for construction projects spearheaded by the MNDAA. The MNDAA issued Shan State Special Region 1 ID cards and pushed a sinicisation policy. MNDAA mandates also led to the town increasingly called "Mupang (မူပန်)" after the Chinese name for the Hsenwi State (Chinese: 木邦; pinyin: Mùbāng) as opposed to the Chinese name Xingwei (兴威) used for the town previously.

== Population ==
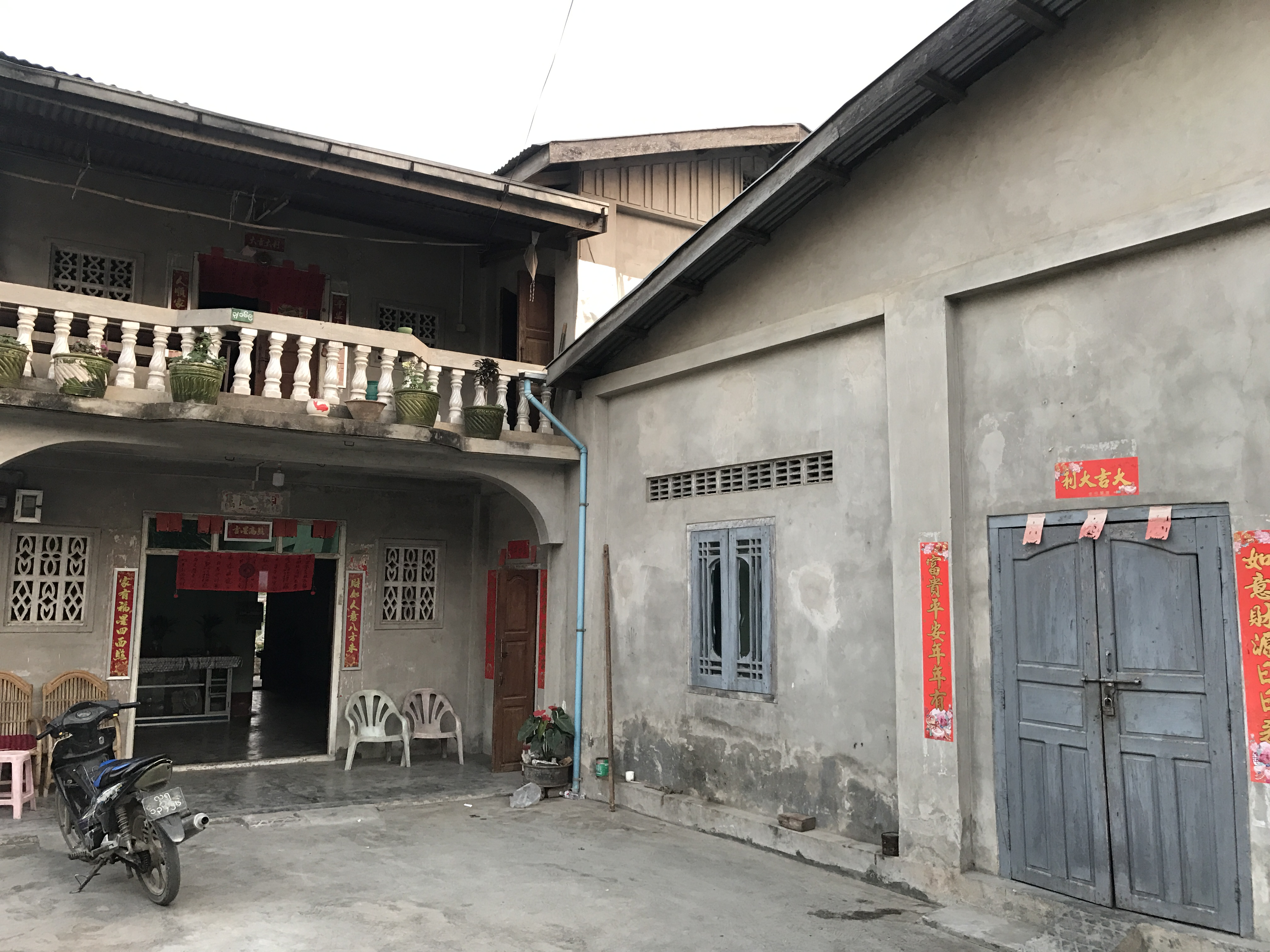
A typical ethnic Chinese house in Theinni, Northern Shan State

The ethnic groups found in Theinni are predominantly Shan, Kokang Chinese and Jinghpaw, but there are many Chinese, Burmese, Lisu, Lahu, Wa, Palaung and Yanglam people in the town.

== Geography ==
The northern part of North Theinni is a mass of hills affected by the geological fault which has produced the rift that forms the Nam Tu or Myitnge valley, and has thrown up a series of parallel ranges which extend northwards to the Shweli River (Lung Kiang), without altogether destroying the north and south trend which is the characteristic of the Shan hills as a whole. In the valleys between these hills are numerous tracts under rice cultivation, some circular or oval, some mere ribands along the river banks.

The southern portion has much more flat land, along the, line of the Nam Tu, its tributaries the Nam Yao and the Nam Nim, and the Nam Yek flowing into the Salween. This was formerly densely populated, and still remains the most valuable portion of the state. A range running westwards from the Salween, and marking the southern border of the rift in the hills, divides North from South Theinni. Both north and south of the Nam Tu there are many peaks which rise to 6,000 feet (1,800 m), and several over 7,000 feet (2,100 m). The northern portion is almost consistent enough in its altitude of about 4,000 feet (1,200 m) to be called a plateau. It has large, grassy, upland downs. This part of the state has fallen almost entirely into the hands of the Kachins.

The Shans are found in the Nam Mao (Shweli or Lung Kiang) valley, and in the Nam Tu and other valleys in the southern part of the state. The line of the Nam Mao is the lowest portion of North Theinni, being little over 2,000 feet (610 m) above sea-level. The southern valleys are about more than 500 feet (150 m) ft or higher. South Theinni is practically bisected by the huge mass of Loi Ling, nearly 9,000 feet (2,700 m) above sea-level, and by the spurs which that peak sends north and south. Apart from this it consists of broken hill-country of no great height, or open rolling downs, the latter chiefly in the eastern half of the state. It is watered by numerous streams, of which the chief is the Nam Pang, an affluent of the Salween.

=== Rivers ===
The chief river in the northern state, apart from the Salween, is the Nam Tu or Myitnge, which rises on the Irrawaddy- Salween watershed, not far from the latter, and flows westwards through the state into Taungbaing or Thibaw, and eventually into the Irrawaddy at Amarapura. The Nam Mao or Shweli only skirts the state, but it receives a considerable tributary, the Nam Paw, which has its entire course in Theinni territory, and is large enough to be barely fordable in the dry weather, and only passable by boats in the rains. The deforestation caused by years of upland cultivation has dried up many of the springs, but as a whole North Theinni is very well watered. Considerable deposits of coal, or rather of lignite, exist in both North and South Theinni, but do not appear to be of high quality. Gold is washed in many of the streams in a fitful way. Limestone exists in large quantities. No valuable timber exists to any considerable extent.

=== Vegetation ===
There is some teak in the Nam Yao valley, and scattered wood-oil trees exist. Pine forests cover some of the ranges, but, as elsewhere in the Shan states, varieties of the oak and chestnut are the commonest forest trees.

=== Climate ===
The climate of the state as a whole is temperate. In the plains of the uplands there are yearly frosts in January, February and March, but in the greater part of the state the thermometer rarely falls to freezing-point, and in the hot weather does not exceed ninety degrees for any length of time. The average rainfall seems to be about 60 inches (1,500 mm) yearly.

== See also ==
- Hsenwi State
- Hsenwi Palace
