= Hsenwi State =

Former Shan state in Burma

Coordinates: 22°56′N 97°45′E

Hsenwi သဵၼ်ႈဝီ
- State of the Shan States
- 7th century–1888
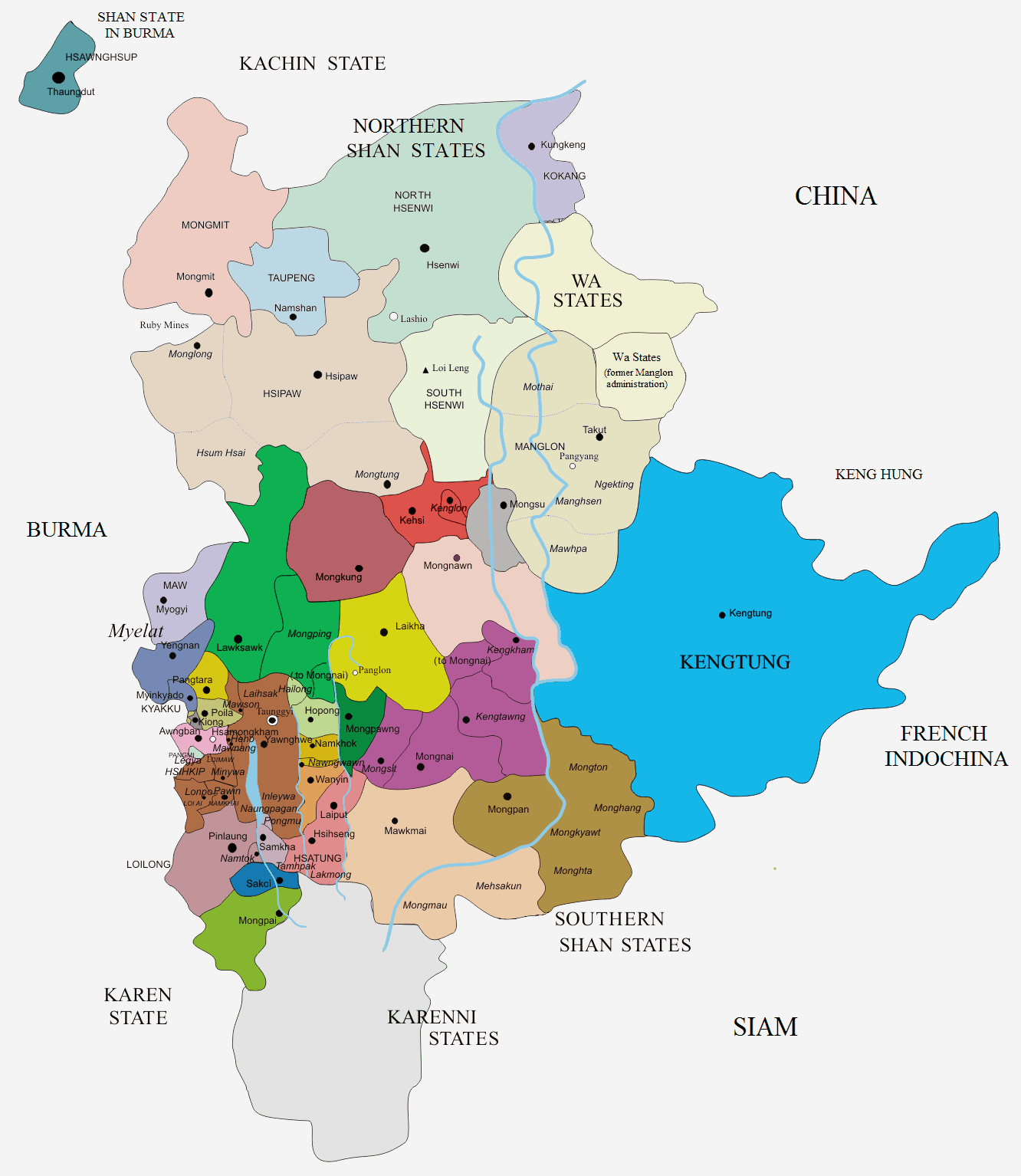
- Hsenwi in a map of the Shan States
- Capital: Theinni
- Area
- 22,654.35 km^{2} (8,746.89 sq mi)
- History
  - Sivirattha State founded: 7th century
  - Split into two states: 1888
Succeeded by
North Hsenwi; South Hsenwi

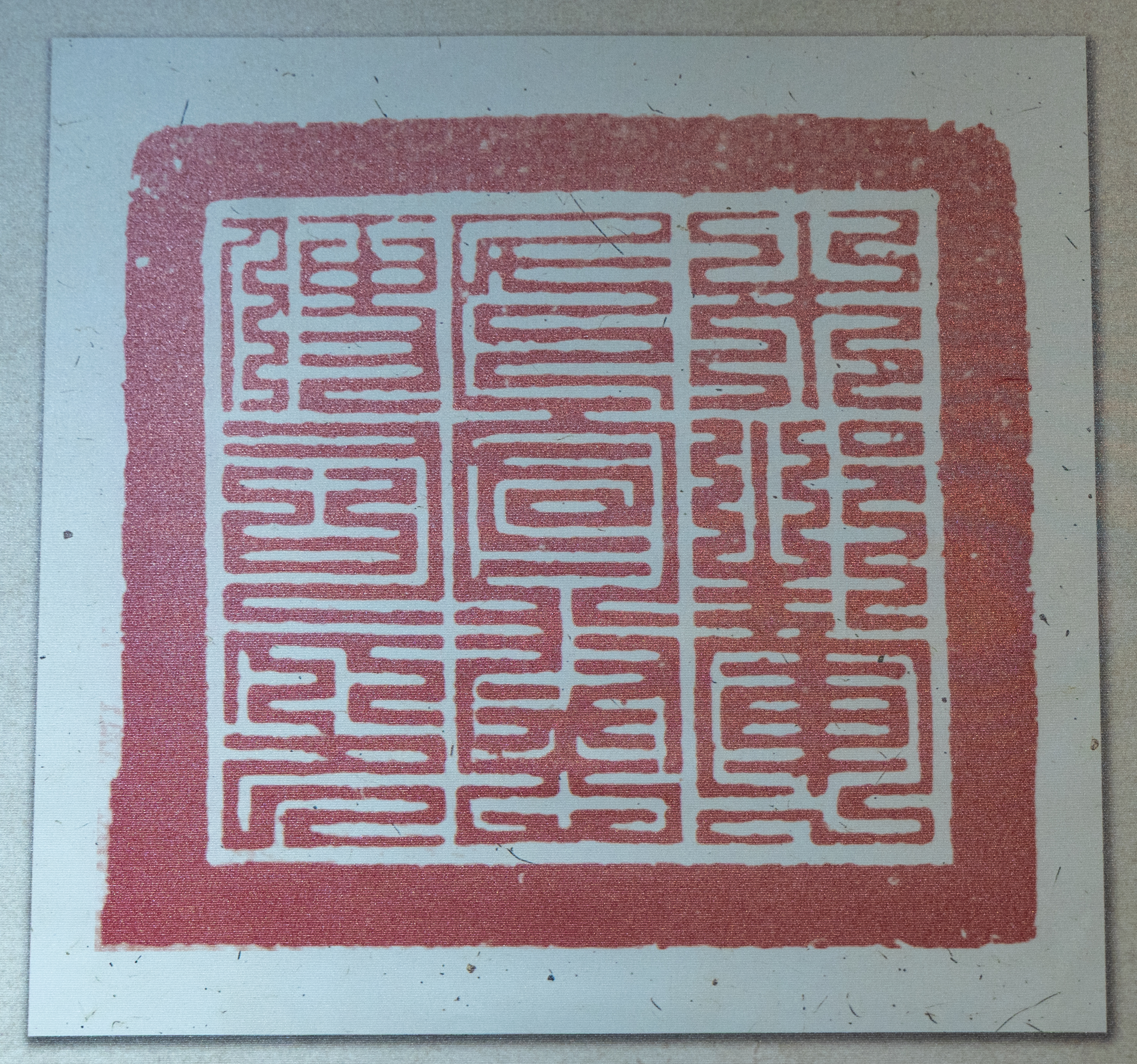
Seal impression of "Mubang Military and Civilian Pacification Commissioner". The seal was made in 1404, the impression was collected in Suzhou, 1950, and the seal is missing now.

Hsenwi (Shan: သဵၼ်ႈဝီ; Tai Nüa: ᥔᥦᥢᥲ ᥝᥤᥴ), also known as Theinni (Burmese: သိန္နီ), was a Shan state in the Northern Shan States in what is today Burma. The capital was Hsenwi town.

== History ==
Most Tai Yai chronicles begin with the story of two brothers, Khun Lung and Khun Lai, who descended from heaven in the 6th century and landed in Hsenwi, where the local population hailed them as kings.

According to tradition, the predecessor state of Siviraṭṭha was founded before 650 AD.

Hsenwi was the largest of the cis-Salween Shan states, and at one time included all of what are now the present states of North and South Hsenwi, Kehsi Mansam, Mong Hsu, Mong Sang, and Mong Nawng. It also held Mang Lon and other Wa states east of the Salween in a protectorate-like arrangement, but during Burmese times, the state lost control of these areas.

During the Sino-Burmese War (1765–69) the Qianlong Emperor of China invaded the area of Hsenwi. The main Chinese army, led by Ming Rui, was to approach Ava through Hsenwi, Lashio and Hsipaw down the Namtu river. The main invasion route was the same route followed by the Manchu forces a century earlier, chasing the Yongli Emperor of the Southern Ming dynasty. The second army, led by Gen. E'erdeng'e, was to try the Bhamo route again. The ultimate objective was for both armies to clamp themselves in a pincer action on the Burmese capital of Ava. The Burmese plan was to hold the second Chinese army in the north at Kaungton with the army led by Ne Myo Sithu, and meet the main Chinese army in the northeast with two armies led by Maha Sithu and Maha Thiha Thura.

At first, everything went according to plan for the Qing. The third invasion began in November 1767 as the smaller Chinese army attacked and occupied Bhamo. Within eight days, Ming Rui's main army occupied the Shan states of Hsenwi and Hsipaw. Ming Rui made Hsenwi a supply base, and assigned 5000 troops to remain at Hsenwi and guard the rear. He then led a 15,000-strong army in the direction of Ava. In late December, at the Goteik Gorge (south of Hsipaw), the two main armies faced off and the first major battle of the third invasion ensued. Outnumbered two-to-one, Maha Sithu's main Burmese army was thoroughly routed by Ming Rui's Bannermen. Maha Thiha Thura too was repulsed at Hsenwi. The news of the disaster at Goteik reached Ava. Hsinbyushin finally realized the gravity of the situation, and urgently recalled Burmese armies from Siam.

Having smashed through the main Burmese army, Ming Rui pressed on full steam ahead, overrunning one town after another, and reached Singu on the Irrawaddy, 30 miles north of Ava at the beginning of 1768. The only bright spot for the Burmese was that the northern invasion force, which was to come down the Irrawaddy to join up with Ming Rui's main army, had been held off at Kaungton.

=== British rule and division of the state ===
At the time of the annexation following British rule in Burma, Hsenwi was composed of five de jure divisions; but the administration of the area was in chaos, with no central control.

After the pacification of the region in March 1888, the colonial administration divided Hsenwi into two states:

- North Hsenwi, assigned to a successful adventurer, Hkun Sang, of Ton Hong.
- South Hsenwi which went to Nawmong, of the old Shan ruling house.

== Rulers ==
The rulers of Hsenwi bore the title Saopha.

=== Saophas ===
Reign	Ruler
1686–1721	Hso Hung Hpa
1721	Se U III -Regent (2nd time)
1721–1724	Han Hpa Hko Hkam Hung -Regent
1724–1730	Hpawng Mong Long Hsung Wat
1730	Mong Hkam -Regent
1730	Hkam Hong -Regent (1st time)
1730–1746	Sao Hkam Hsawng Hpa
1746	Hkam Hong -Regent (2nd time)
1746 – c.1747	Sao Hkun Hseng Hong
c.1747 – 1750	Mahadevi Wing Hsup Pang -Regent
1750	Hkam Hong -Regent (3rd time)
1750–1751	Sao Mang Te
1751–1752	Hkam Hong -Regent (4th time)
1752–1761	Vacant
1761–1767	Hkun Hseng Awng Tun
1767–1770	Myauk Win Hmu -Regent
1770–1772	Sayawadi Wun
1772–1773	Sety-taw Wun
1773–1775	U Teng Pong Nya
1775–1775	Vacant
1778–1800	Sao Hswe Cheng (Kon)
1800	Hsup Pang -Regent
1800–1815	Sao Hsö Kaw
1815–1819	Mogaung Wun -Regent
1819–1821	Sao Naw Möng
1821–1824	Hkun Hkam Hkawt
1824–1827	Sao Hkam Pak
1827–1831	Sao Hkam Nan
1831–1838	Sao Hkun Maung Lek
1838–1845	Sao Hkam Leng (Hsö Hkan Hpa) (d. 1847)
1845–1848	Sao Hseng Naw Hpa (1st time) (d. 1864)
1848–1853	Vacant
1853–1855	Sao Hseng Naw Hpa (2nd time)
1855–1858	Vacant
1858–1860	Sao Hpa Mawng Hpa (1st time) (d. 1891)
1860–1863	Vacant
1863–1864	Sao Hpa Mawng Hpa (2nd time) (s.a.)
1864–1866	Shwe Pyi Bo
1866–1867	U Ma Nga
1867–1869	Sao Hseng Naw Hpa (3rd time) (s.a.)
1869–1873	Vacant
1873–1874	Win Hmu
1874–1875	Sao Hseng Naw Hpa (4th time) (s.a.)
1875–1876	Natsu Letya
1876–1879	Sao Hseng Naw Hpa (5th time) (s.a.)
1879 – Mar 1888	Hkun Hsang Tone Hung (b. 1852 – d. 1915)

=== Rulers of united Hsenwi ===
#	Ruler	Begin	End	Details
1	Hkun Lu Hkam	825	845	
2	Hkun Lai Hkam	845	915	
3	Sao Tai Hkan Hpa	915	952	
4	Sao Tai Pong	952	975	
5	Sao Tai Long	975	1019	
6	Sao Noi Hkè	1019	1028	
7	Sao Noi Myen	1028	1076	
8	Sao Noi Hsan	1076	1096	
9	Hkun Hpang Hkam - (Ai Hsawng)	1096	1127	Younger brothers Yi Hsawng was Mongmit sawbwa and Hsam Hsawng was Monglong sawbwa
10	Hkun Kang Hkam	1127	1152	North Hsenwi chronicle told this birth name of Hso Hkan Hpa
11	Hso Hkan Hpa	1152	?	
12	Hso Wat Hpa	?	1232	
13	Hso Pem Hpa	1232	1255	Son of Hso Wat Hpa
14	Hkam Wat Hpa	1255	1274	Son of Hso Pem Hpa
15	Hso Hom Hpa	1274	1291	Brother of Hkam Wat Hpa
16	Hso Yep Hpa	1291	1302	
17	Hso Hom Hpa	1302	1320	Son of Hkam Wat Hpa
18	Hkam Tet Hpa	1320	1356	Son of Hso Hom Hpa
19	Hkam Pem Hpa	1403/04	1405/06	
20	Hkam Pöt Hpa	1405/06	1407/08	Brother
21	Hkam Hkai Hpa	1407/08	1412	Son
22	Hkam Yawt Hpa	1412	1444/45	Son
23	Hkam Wat Hpa	1444/45	1459/60	
24	Hkam Hep Hpa	1459/60	1495/96	
25	Hkam Hsen Hpa	1522	1532	
26	Hkam Hken Hpa	1532	1537	
27	Hkam Pak Hpa	1537	1541	
28	Hkam Hsen Löng Hpa	1541	1570	
29	Hkam Hküng Hpa	1570	1632	Subjugation of Hsenwi Löng by Hso Hung Hpa Mong Mit sawbwa
30	Hkam Hso Nan Hpa	1632	1640	
31	Hkam Kai Noi Sao Kin - (Hso Hsen Hpa)	1640	1651	Have Hso Hung Hpa his son, Nang Hkam Höng his daught
32	Hkam Hso Hung Hpa	1651	1680	Son of Hkam Kai Noi Sao Kin
33	Hso Sün Hpa	1680	1686	
34	Hso Hüng Hpa - (Hkam Li, Hso Naw Hpa)	1686	1721	
35	Han Hpa Hko Hkam Höng	1721	1724	
36	Hpawng Mawng Löng Hsunt Wat	1724	1730	
37	Hkam Hsawng Hpa	1730	1746	
38	Hkun Hseng Höng	1746	1750	Married with Nang Hseng Pu, the niece of Hke Sa Wa, Yawnghwe sawbwa
39	Sao Mang Te	1750	1761	Brother of Hkun Hseng Höng
40	Hkun Hseng Awng Tun	1761	1767	
41	Myauk Win Hmu	1767	1770	
42	Sayawaddy Wun	1770	1772	
43	Set-taw Wun	1772	1773	
44	U Têng Pöng Nya	1773	1776	
—	—	1776	1778	Vacant
45	Hso Wei Hpa - (Hswe Kön Cheng)	1778	1800	His two daughters, Hseng Santa and Shin Hsansi became King Badon's queen consort
46	Hso Kaw Hpa	1800	1815	
47	Mogaung Wun	1815	1819	
48	Sao Naw Möng	1819	1821	
49	Hkun Hkam Hkawt	1821	1824	
50	Sao Hkam Pak	1824	1827	Killed in first Burmese war
51	Sao Hkam Nan	1827	1831	Brother of Sao Hkam Pak
52	Sao Hkun Mawng	1831	1838	
53	Sao Hkam Lêng - (Hso Hkan Hpa)	1838	1845	
54	Hso Naw Hpa — 1st time	1845	1853	
55	Hso Nan Hpa	1853	1856	
56	Sikkè Sinkadan	1856	1858	
57	Sao Hpa Möng Hpo — 1st time	1858	1860	
58	Phagyi Wun	1860	1861	
57	Sao Hpa Möng Hpo — 2nd time	1861	1862	
59	Bo Maü	1862	1863	
57	Sao Hpa Möng Hpo — 3rd time	1863	1864	
60	Shwe Pyi Bo	1864	1866	
61	U Ma Nga	1866	1867	
54	Hso Naw Hpa — 2nd time	1867	1869	
62	Wundauk U Shwe Kyo — 1st time	1869	1870	
63	Sikkè U San Min	1870	1871	
62	Wundauk U Shwe Kyo — 2nd time	1871	1873	
64	Win Hmu	1873	1874	
54	Hso Naw Hpa — 3rd time	1874	1875	
65	Natsu Letya	1875	1876	
54	Hso Naw Hpa — 4th time	1876	1879	Retired to Möng Sit in 1879
66	Hkun Hsang Tön Höng	1879	1888	

== Popular culture ==
- Hsenwi is a playable nation in the strategy video game Europa Universalis IV.

== See also ==
- Hsenwi Yazawin
- Sino-Burmese War (1765–69)

== Bibliography ==
- Hall, D. G. E. (1960). Burma. Hutchinson University Library (3rd ed.). London: Hutchinson. ISBN 978-1-4067-3503-1.
- Haskew, Michael E.; Joregensen, Christer; Niderost, Eric; McNab, Chris (2008). Fighting techniques of the Oriental world, AD 1200–1860: equipment, combat skills, and tactics (Illustrated ed.). New York: St. Martin's Press. ISBN 978-0-312-38696-2.
- Htin Aung, Maung (1967). A History of Burma. New York and London: Cambridge University Press – via the Internet Archive.
- Harvey, G. E. (1925). History of Burma: From the Earliest Times to 10 March 1824. London: Longmans, Green and Co. – via the Internet Archive.
- Kyaw Thet (1962). ပြည်ထောင်စု မြန်မာနိုင်ငံ သမိုင်း [History of Union of Burma] (in Burmese). Yangon: Yangon University Press.
- Phayre, Sir Arthur Purves (1884). History of Burma: including Burma proper, Pegu, Taungu, Tenasserim, and Arakan. From the earliest time to the end of the first war with British India. Trübner & Co. – via Google Books.
