= Mong Hsu District =

District in Shan State, Myanmar

Mong Shu District မိုင်းရှူးခရိုင်
- Monghsu District (Red) in Shan State
- Coordinates: 21.929°N 97.960°E
- Country: Myanmar
- Region: Shan State
- Capital: Mong Hsu
- Time zone: MMT

Mong Hsu District (Burmese: မိုင်းရှူးခရိုင်, officially Mong Shu District) is a district in central Shan State, Myanmar. It was split from Loilen District on 30 April 2022 and contains two townships. Its district seat is Mong Hsu.

== Townships ==
Townships in Mong Hsu District:

- Mong Hsu Township
  - Mong San Subtownship
- Kyethi Township
  - Mong Nawng Subtownship
