= Hsenwi Yazawin =

19th-century Burmese chronicle

Theinni Yazawin
- Original title: သိန္နီ ရာဇဝင်
- Language: Shan
- Series: Shan chronicles
- Genre: Chronicle, History
- Publication date: 19th century
- Publication place: Hsenwi, Kingdom of Burma

Hsenwi Yazawin or Theinni Yazawin (Burmese: သိန္နီ ရာဇဝင်, lit. 'Chronicle of Hsenwi (Theinni)') is a 19th-century Burmese chronicle that covers the history of the Shan state of Hsenwi (Theinni). It is believed to have been written after the publication of Hmannan Yazawin.

== Bibliography ==
- Cochrane, W.W. (1915). The Shans. Vol. 1. Yangon: Superintendent, Government Printing.
- James George Scott (1967). "Hsenwi State Chronicle". The Guardian. Online Burma/Myanmar Library.
