= Möng Sang =

Former Shan State in Burma

Coordinates: 21°48′N 98°21′E

- State of the Shan States in personal union with Möng Hsu
- 1857–1959
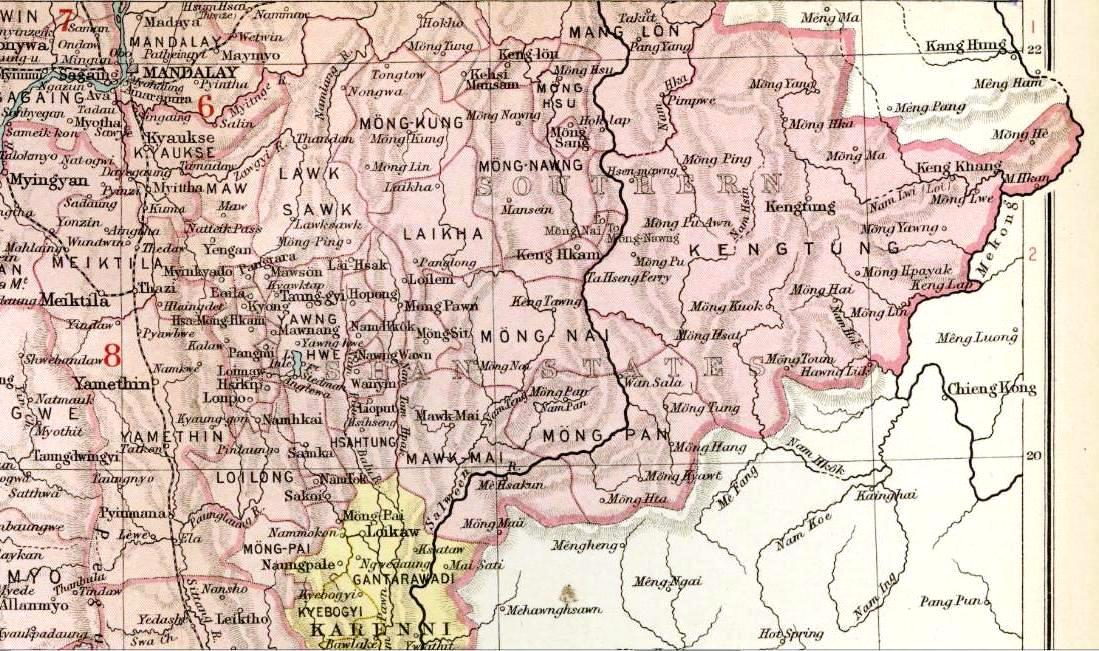
- Möng Sang in an Imperial Gazetteer of India map
- Area
  - 1901: 2,650 km^{2} (1,020 sq mi)
- Population
  - 1901: 30,482
- History
  - State founded: 1857
  - Abdication of the last Myoza: 1959
Preceded by	Succeeded by
Hsenwi State	Shan State

Möng Sang (also known as Maingsin) was a Shan state in what is today Burma.

== History ==
Möng Sang became independent from Hsenwi in 1857 under a personal union with the neighbouring state of Monghsu. It was a tributary of Burma until 1887, when the Shan states submitted to British rule after the fall of the Konbaung dynasty.

=== Rulers ===
The rulers of Möng Sang/Möng Hsu bore the title of Myoza.

==== Myozas ====
- 1857 - 1879 Hkun Mon
- 1879 - 1901 Hkun Maha
- 1901 - 1917 Hkun Kyaw (b. 1845 - d. 1917)
- 1917 - 19.. Hkun Sao (Hkun Saw) (b. 1845 - d. 19..)
