= Mong Hsu =

Mong Hsu မိုင်းရှူးမြို့
- Town
- Mong Shu
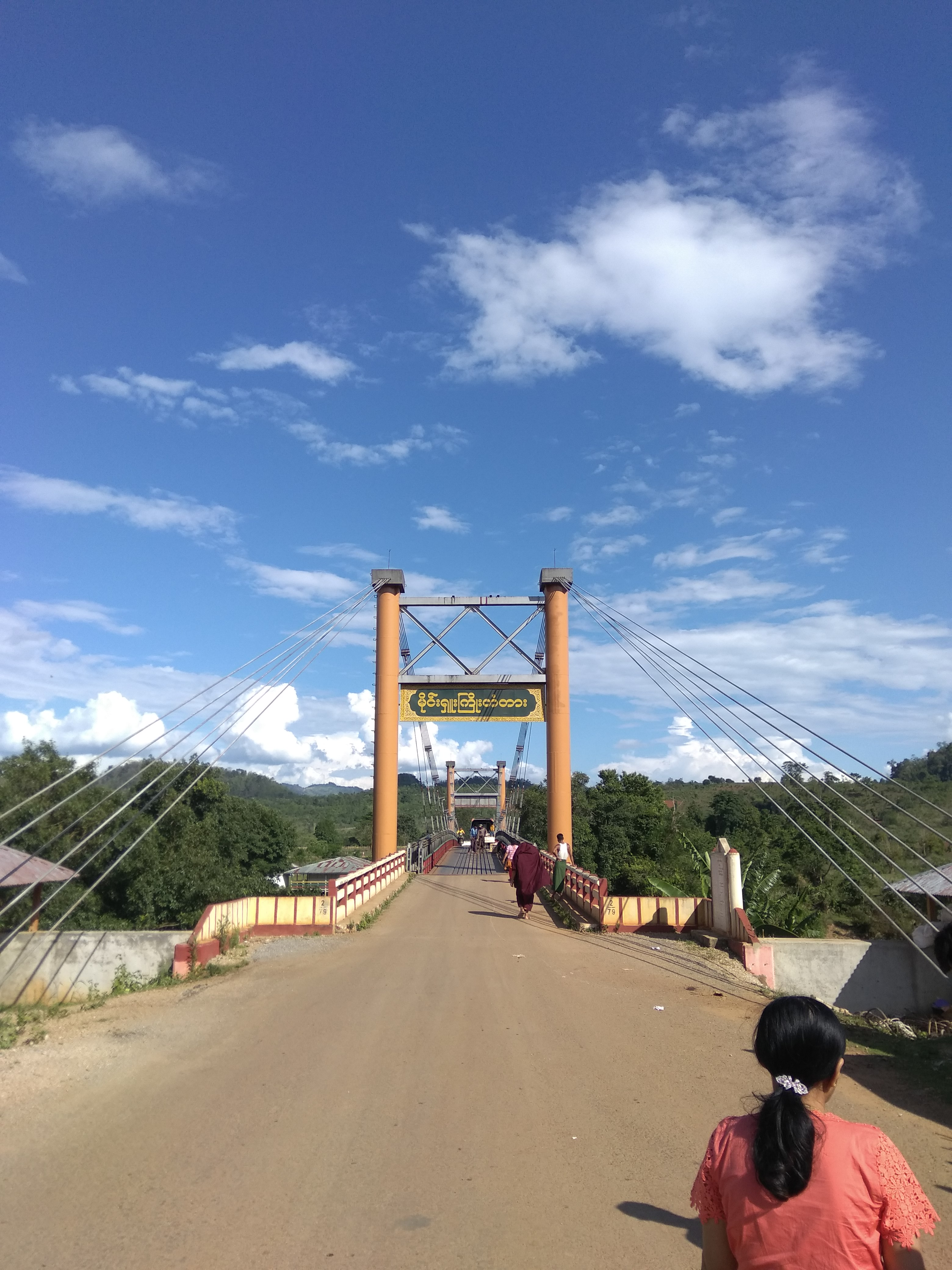

- Location in Myanmar
- Coordinates: 21°55′N 98°23′E
- Country: Myanmar
- State: Shan
- District: Mong Hsu District
- Township: Mong Hsu Township
- Elevation: 707 m (2,320 ft)
- Time zone: UTC+6.30 (MST)

Mong Hsu (Burmese: မိုင်းရှူးမြို့, officially Mong Shu) is the capital of Mong Hsu District and the principal town of Mong Hsu Township in central Shan State.

== History ==
It was the main town of one of the Shan States, Monghsu, known in ancient times as Hansawadi.

In early 1990s, there is a major discovery rubies near Mong Hsu. Within a few years, Mong Hsu rubies constituted over 95% of faceted rubies entering world market; however, they require considerable sophisticated treatment.

In 2022, Mong Hsu Township and its western neighbour Kyethi Township were split off from Loilen District to form the new Mong Hsu District for which Mong Hsu became the capital.
