= Min Bin =

King of Arakan from 1531 to 1554

Min Bin မင်းပင်
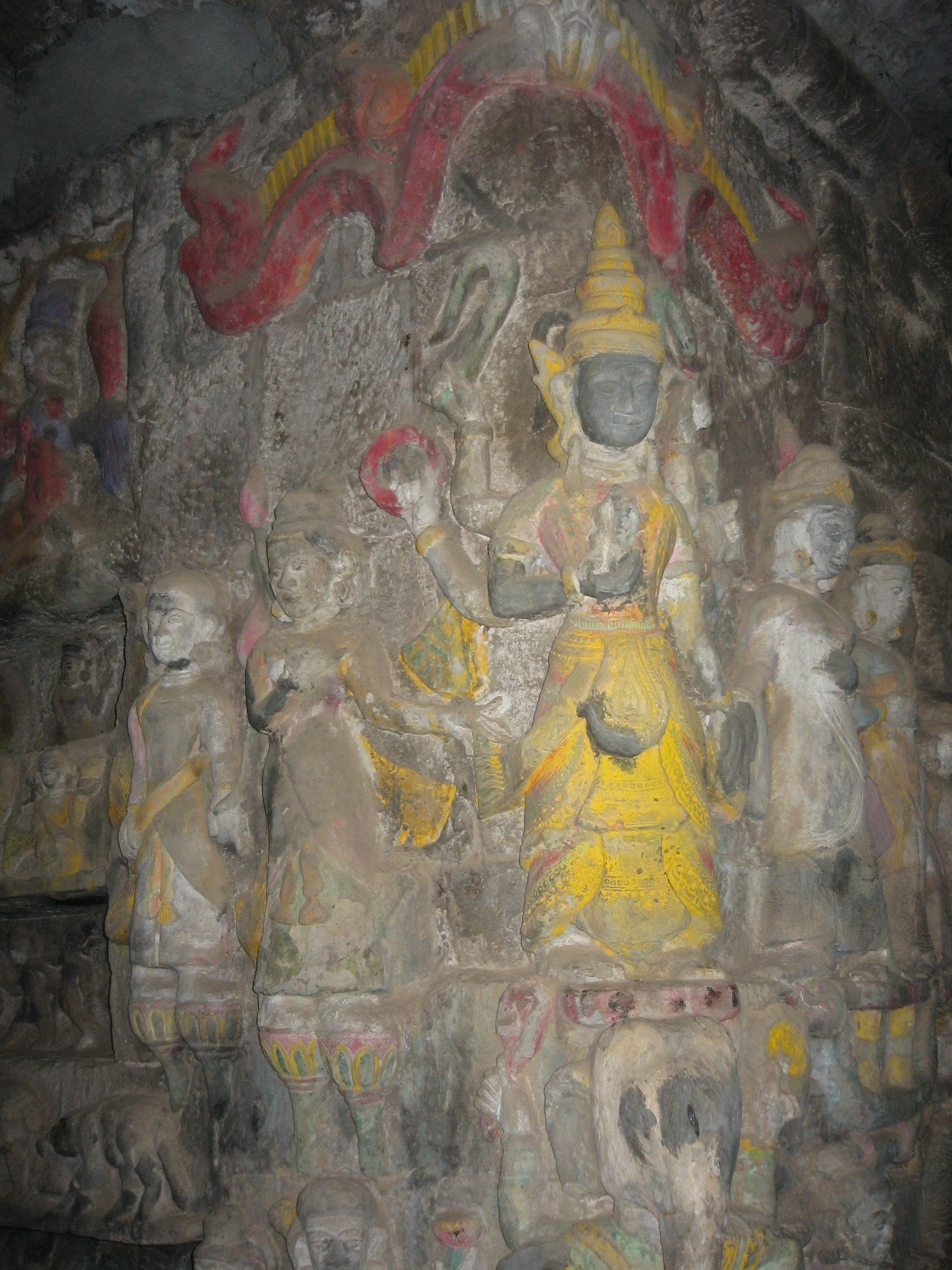
- Min Bin, depicted as a god, in the Shitthaung Temple, Mrauk U

King of Arakan
- Reign: 27 May 1531 – 11 January 1554
- Coronation: 16 September 1531
- Predecessor: Minkhaung
- Successor: Dikkha
- Born: c. 26 February 1493; Saturday, c. Tabaung 854 ME (Note: He was born on a Saturday between 26 January 1493 and 23 March 1493. (Sandamala Linkara Vol. 2 1999: 35, 39, 48): He was born in 854 ME on a Saturday, and died in 915 ME, and a new king came to power on 8th waning of Tabodwe 915 ME (11 January 1554). It means he was born between 9th waning of Tabodwe 854 ME (26 January 1493) and the last day of 854 ME (28 March 1493). And since he was born on a Saturday, the possible dates of birth are: (26 January), (2, 9, 16, 23 February), (2, 9, 16, 23 March).); Mrauk-U, Kingdom of Mrauk U
- Died: 11 January 1554 (aged 60); Thursday, 8th waning of Tabodwe 915 ME; Mrauk-U
- Burial: Shitthaung Temple
- Consort: Saw Min Hla; Saw Kauk Ma II; Minkhaung Medaw; Saw Mae Kyi; Saw Shin
- Issue: 10 children including Min Dikkha and Min Phalaung
Names
- Thiri Thuriya Sanda Maha Dhamma Yaza Siri Sūriya Canda Mahā Dhamma Rājā သီရိ သူရိယ စန္ဒ မဟာ ဓမ္မ ရာဇာ Zabuk Shah (ဇာပေါက်သျှာ)
- Father: Raza
- Mother: Saw Nandi
- Religion: Theravada Buddhism

Min Bin (Arakanese and Burmese: မင်းဘင်, Burmese pronunciation: [mɪ́ɰ̃ bɪ̀ɰ̃], Arakanese pronunciation: [máɰ̃ bàɰ̃]; also known as Min Ba-Gyi (မင်းဗာကြီး, Burmese pronunciation: [mɪ́ɰ̃ bàjí], Meng Ba-Gri, Arakanese pronunciation: [máɰ̃ bà ɡɹí]); 1493–1554) was a king of Arakan, a former state in Myanmar (Burma), from 1531 to 1554, "whose reign witnessed the country's emergence as a major power". Aided by Portuguese mercenaries and their firearms, his powerful navy and army pushed the boundaries of the kingdom deep into Bengal, where coins bearing his name and styling him sultan were struck, and even interfered in the affairs of mainland Burma. He carried the esteemed title "Lord of the White Umbrella" (ထီးဖြူရှင်). He was additionally known as Zabuk Shah by the neighbouring Bengal.

After his initial military successes against Bengal and Tripura (1532–34), Min Bin began to regard himself "as a world conqueror or cakravartin", and in commemoration of his victory in Bengal he built the Shitthaung Temple, one of the premier Buddhist pagodas of Mrauk-U. His expansionist drive was to run into serious obstacles however. His control of Bengal beyond Chittagong was largely nominal and he, like the sultans of Bengal before him, never solved Tripuri raids into Bengal. Moreover, his interference in Lower Burma (1542) against Toungoo provoked Toungoo invasions in (1545–47) that nearly toppled his regime. He survived the invasions and later provided military aid to Ava, hoping to stop Toungoo's advance into Upper Burma.

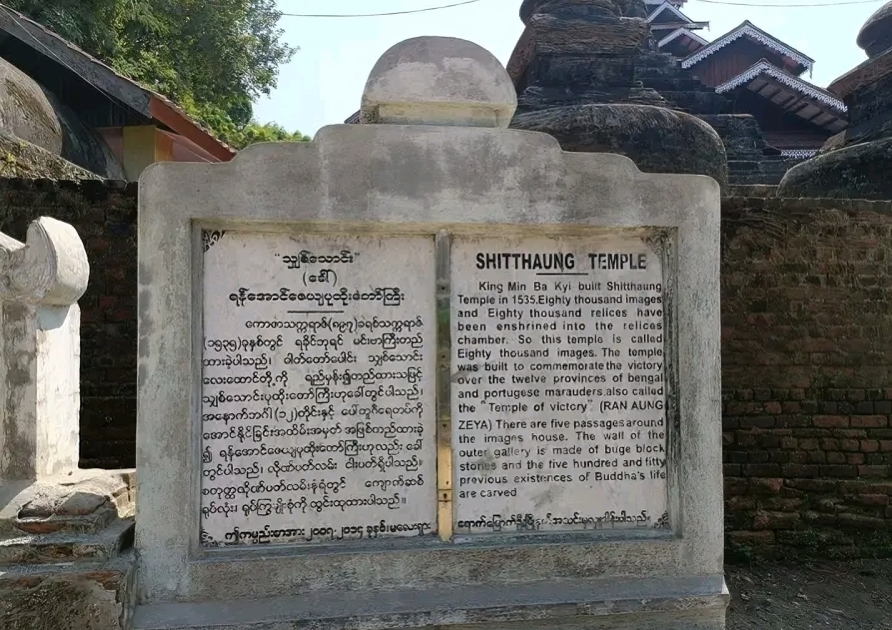
Inscription at the Shittaung Temple about Min Bin

The king died in January 1554, and was succeeded by his eldest son and heir apparent Min Dikkha. His legacy lived on. The defensive works he built up throughout the kingdom would deter another Toungoo invasion until 1580. He is also credited with creating a naval fleet that dominated the Bay of Bengal, which in the following century would enable Arakan to control the entire 1600-km coastline from the Sundarbans to the Gulf of Martaban. His 22-year reign transformed Mrauk-U into a major regional power, a status which Mrauk-U would maintain well into the second half of the 17th century.

== Early life ==
The future king was born Min Pa (မင်းပါ) to Crown Prince Raza of Mrauk-U and Princess Saw Nandi in 1493. His parents were first cousins; his mother was a daughter of Raza's maternal uncle. He had at least one younger brother named Min Aung Hla, and many half-siblings. In 1502, his grandfather King Salingathu died, and his father succeeded the throne. As king, his father raised three new queens, and made his mother just a minor queen. A few years later, the king appointed Min Pa as a general in the army.

== Rise to power ==
In 1513, Raza was overthrown by Gazapati, another son by a concubine. Although Min Pa was older than Gazapati and had a more legitimate claim to the throne, he stayed out of the limelight. He managed to survive intrigues and power struggles at the court which saw three different kings (Gazapati, Saw O and Thazata) in the next eight years. In 1521, King Thazata died, and the king's younger brother Minkhaung succeeded in getting the throne. Though he lost out the throne to Minkhaung, Min Pa however managed to get appointed as the new governor of Thandwe (Sandoway), the second most important city in the kingdom. At Thandwe, Min Pa patiently built a loyal following, and collected arms. Ten years later, he revolted, and marched to Mrauk-U with land and naval forces. At Mrauk-U, his forces defeated the king's army, and he had Minkhaung executed.

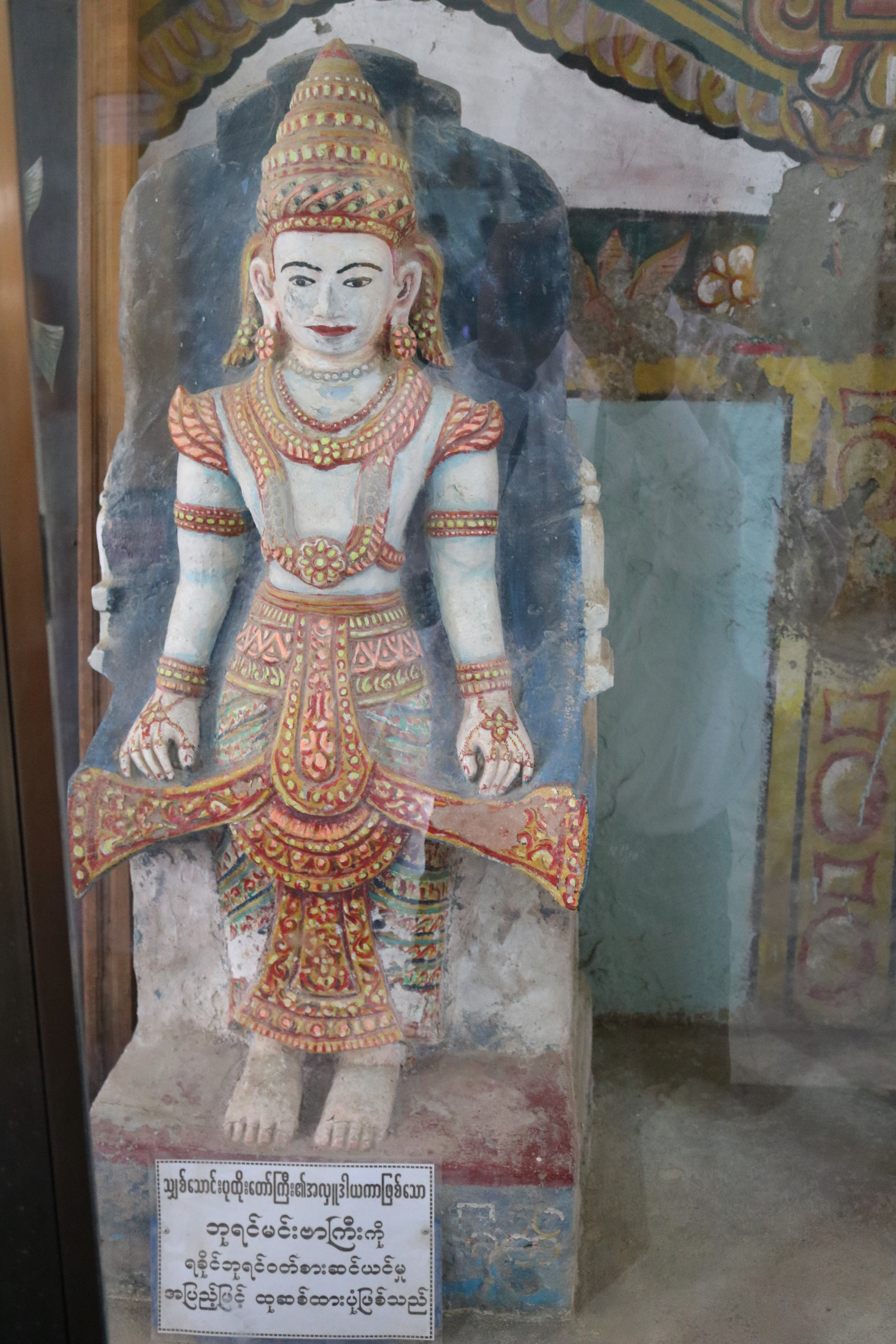
King Min Bin Statue

== Reign ==
=== Consolidation ===
Min Bin ascended to the throne on Saturday, 27 May 1531, with the royal styles of Thiri Thuriya Sanda Maha Dhamma Yaza and Zabuk Shah. (Note: The chronicle Rakhine Razawin Thit (Sandamala Linkara Vol. 2 1999: 29) says he came to power on Saturday, 1st waxing of Nayon 893 ME, which translates to Wednesday, 17 May 1531. The correct date should be Saturday, 11th waxing of Nayon 893 ME, which translates to Saturday, 27 May 1531.) As someone who came to power by force, the new king immediately issued a decree to raise the defenses of Mrauk-U. (In the following decade, the capital Mrauk-U would get an elaborate defensive works consisted of massive stone walls and a deep moat filled with tidal waters. The defense works were later extended to the rest of the kingdom, as after 1532, the coastal areas of the kingdom were liable to pillage by Portuguese pirates.) He also worked to consolidate his rule, and was to face no opposition. Lords from around the kingdom came to pledge their allegiance on 16 September 1531 (Note: (Sandamala Linkara Vol. 2 1999: 29) says he ascended to the new palace on Saturday, 2nd waxing of Thadingyut 893 ME, which translates to Wednesday, 13 September 1531. The more likely date is 5th waxing of Thadingyut 893 ME (Saturday, 16 September 1531) since the numbers "2" and "5" in Burmese are written in similar shapes.) at the coronation ceremony at the new palace at Mrauk-U. According to chronicles, one notable absence at the coronation ceremony was Chittagong which had paid tribute to strong Arakanese kings Ba Saw Phyu (r. 1459–1482) and Dawlya (r. 1482–1492). Min Bin was determined to restore what he called his forebears' rightful realm, which according to him, included all of Bengal, not just Chittagong. (Note: According to chronicles (Sandamala Linkara Vol. 2 1999: 36–37) Min Bin claimed that all of Bengal was part of ancient Arakanese kingdoms, and that King Saw Mon had allowed the territories of Bengal to be under the rule of Bengal sultans for their help in getting Saw Mon regain the Arakanese throne. However, scholarship holds that Saw Mon was a vassal of Bengal. It was not just East Bengal but all of Arakan was tributary to Bengal. Moreover, the first Arakanese control over East Bengal most probably came in 1459 per (Phayre 1967: 78). Arakanese intrusions to other parts of Bengal came only under Min Bin.)

=== Acquisition of Bengal (1532–1533) ===
If his claim that all of Bengal belonged to ancient Arakanese kingdoms is unfounded, it was nonetheless used by Min Bin as the pretext to exploit the growing weakness of Bengal. The sultanate had been in long decline due to its wars with the Delhi Sultanate and the Ahom Kingdom. On 7 October 1532 (9th waxing of Tazaungmon 894 ME), he led a combined invasion force of 12,000 (three armies of 11,000 men in a three-pronged attack, and a flotilla of war boats carrying 1,000 troops), and invaded Bengal. (Note: Chronicles (Sandamala Linkara Vol. 2 1999: 36–37) actually say an order of magnitude higher: 110,000-strong armies and a 10,000-strong navy. But per (Harvey 1925: 333–336), the troop numbers reported in Burmese chronicles should be taken an order of magnitude lower.) According to Arakanese chronicles, the combined invasion force defeated a Bengal army of 10,000 men and took Chittagong. The armies then pressed on toward Dhaka on 1 December 1532 (5th waxing of Pyatho 894 ME). The Bengal army made a last stand outside Dhaka but was defeated. The sultan's defenses collapsed afterwards, and Arakanese forces entered Dhaka on 11 December 1532 (15th waxing of Pyatho 894 ME) without a fight. At Dhaka, on 8 February 1533 (Saturday, 15th waxing of Tabaung 894 ME), he received tributes from local lords of Bengal, and raised a 16-year-old princess of Bengal royalty to queen. He then paid a pilgrimage to Bodh Gaya on 26 March 1533 (2nd waxing of Kason 895 ME). He left Dhaka for Mrauk-U on 13 April 1533 (5th waning of Kason 895 ME). He appointed governors of the new acquired territories on 14 May 1533 (6th waning of Nayon 895 ME).

Min Bin’s administration was militarily formidable. He commanded a highly organized and stratified army, including 40,000 royal guards, 20,000 palace troops, and 10,000 elite warriors led by capable commanders like Thado Min Hpu and Da Byi (ဒါးပိုင်ကြီး). According to Arakanese chronicles, Min Bin aimed to conquer twelve Bengali cities. For this campaign, he dispatched 50,000 troops under the leadership of Minister Da Byi. A pagoda was to be built on Wa-thaik Mountain (ဝသဲတောင်) to commemorate the victory.

=== Tripuri raids ===
According to historians, his control of Bengal beyond Chittagong, where coins bearing his name and styling him sultan were struck, was nominal. Like Bengal's sultans before him, he had to contend with raids by "Tripuri tribes" from the north throughout his reign, not just on Dhaka but also on Chittagong and Ramu. Within the year of his conquest of Bengal, he had to send a 5,000-strong army to Dhaka to defend against Tripuri raids. After the rainy season of 1533, he personally led the army to drive out the Tripuri raiders. He was successful, and returned to Mrauk-U on 24 February 1534 (12th waxing of Tabaung 895 ME). Despite the success this time, Min Bin never fully solved the problem of raids by Tripuris. Indeed, when Mrauk-U was under siege by Toungoo forces in 1547, Tripuri forces raided Chittagong and as far south as Ramu. Min Bin had to send a force to drive them out after Toungoo forces retreated.

=== Portuguese ===
By Min Bin's reign, the Portuguese seamen and mercenaries had established themselves as a serious force in Asia. They had seized trading ports of Goa since 1510 and Malacca since 1511, and controlled important sea lanes in South and Southeast Asia. The Arakanese coastline had not escaped their raids, which by Min Bin's reign, had grown increasingly daring. In 1535, the Portuguese brought war to the fortified capital of Mrauk-U itself. According to Arakanese chronicles, a small but well-armed army of Portuguese mercenaries landed on 22 February 1535, (Note: (Sandamala Linkara Vol. 2 1999: 31) says the Portuguese landed on Monday, 5th waxing of Tabaung 896 ME, which translates to Saturday, 6 February 1535. The date was probably 5th waning (not waxing as reported) of Tabaung 896 ME, which translates to Monday, 22 February 1535.) and advanced to up the Kaladan river by boats, reaching Kandaza, a few miles away from Mrauk-U, by 26 February. After defeating an Arakanese force at Kandaza on 27 February, the Portuguese then proceeded to attack Mrauk-U on 28 February. With the king himself leading the defense, the Arakanese forces drove back the better armed but much smaller Portuguese army. The Portuguese fell back to a few marches away, and stuck around for another week until a combined army and flotilla of Arakanese forces drove them out to the sea on 7 March.

Like many rulers in the region, Min Bin realized that the Portuguese problem was not going away, and decided to hire Portuguese mercenaries to his armed forces. In the following years, Min Bin enlisted many Portuguese mercenaries and their firearms, and with their help, he established well-armed naval and army forces.

=== Temple building ===
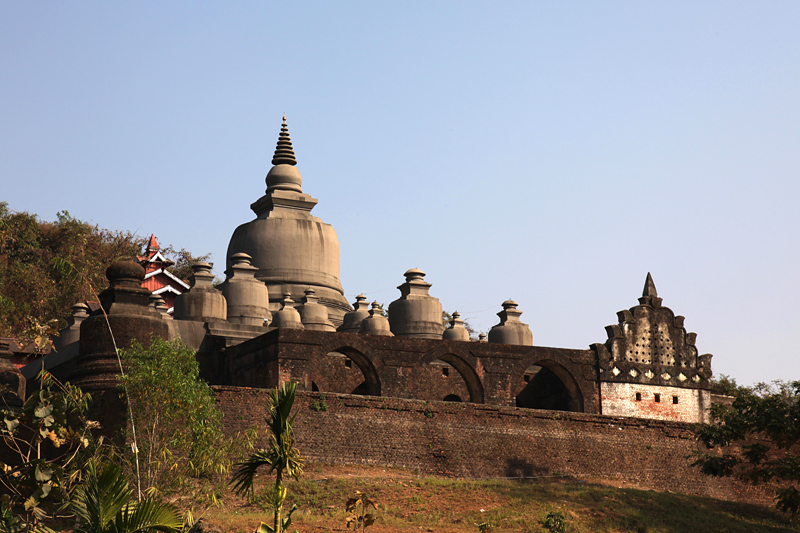
The Shitthaung Temple

After the military successes, Min Bin began to regard himself "as a world conqueror or cakravartin." To commemorate his victory in Bengal, he began the construction of a massive temple complex that would become the Shitthaung Temple (80,000 Buddha Images) attributed to Emperor Ashoka on 9 November 1535 (Full moon of Tazaungmon 897 ME). (Note: The Burmese encyclopedia Myanma Swezon Kyan (MSK 1970: 360) says he laid the foundation stone on Saturday, full moon of Tazaungmon 897 ME, which translates to Tuesday, 9 November 1535.) The design incorporated "elements from Burmese Buddhism and the late Buddhism of northwest India in its iconography, illustrating the power of the king and his religion." He also restored the Andaw-thein Ordination Hall between 1534 and 1542.

=== Wars with Toungoo ===
==== Prome (1542) ====
By the late 1530s, Min Bin had turned Mrauk-U into a serious regional power. Not only did he control the entire Arakan littoral to Chittagong but he also had built up a powerful navy and an army that included many Portuguese mercenaries. But he closely monitored the developments in mainland Burma with great concern, especially after Toungoo's unlikely victory over Hanthawaddy that gave upstart Toungoo control of Lower Burma. He did not want to see a strong, united Irrawaddy valley, which in the past had interfered with the coastal kingdom. When King Minkhaung of Prome, the only holdout in Lower Burma and a vassal of the Confederation of Shan States, asked for an alliance by presenting his sister, the former queen of Hanthawaddy, Min Bin readily agreed. When 17,000-strong Toungoo armies laid siege to Prome (Pyay) in November 1541, Min Bin in early 1542 sent a 5,000-man army through the Padaung Pass across the Arakan Yoma range, and a 7000-man, 700-boat flotilla by the coast to break the siege. However, the army, as it came out of the pass, walked into a trap, and was wiped out by a 6000-strong Toungoo army led by Gen. Kyawhtin Nawrahta. The navy had taken Pathein but retreated after hearing that the army had been annihilated.

==== Toungoo invasion (1545–1547) ====
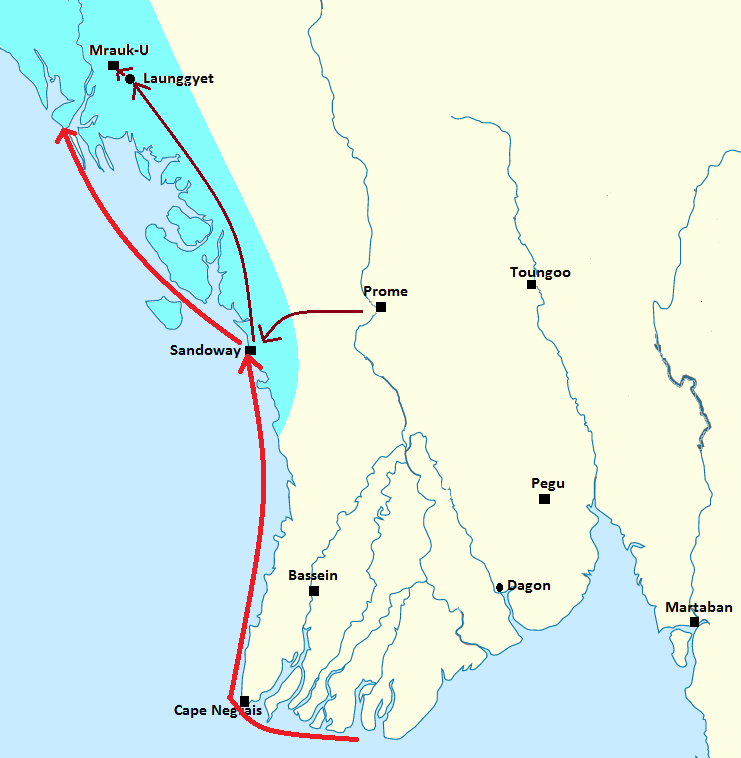
Toungoo invasion routes (1546–47)

After the setback, Min Bin reinforced the defenses of Mrauk-U and forts around the kingdom. History shows that his preparations proved prescient. In October 1545, four Toungoo regiments (4000 men, 100 horses, 10 elephants) intruded into southern Arakan, and marched toward Thandwe, Arakan's second city, which was led by the king's brother Min Aung Hla. On 12 October 1545 (8th waxing of Tazaungmon 907 ME), the king sent a well-armed force, which proceeded to drive out the intruders.

The incursion turned out to be an initial probe by Toungoo, which by then controlled all of Lower Burma and parts of Upper Burma to the ancient capital of Pagan. A year later, on 28 October 1546 (4th waxing of Tazaungmon 908 ME), Toungoo invaded by land and sea with a much larger force (19,000 men, 400 horses, 60 elephants, 80 war boats, 50 armored war boats, 10 cargo ships). Toungoo forces quickly overran southern Arakan. Mrauk-U's land and naval forces put up spirited stands but could not stop the advance. Toungoo forces reached environs of Launggyet, the former capital not far from Mrauk-U, on 23 January 1547 (2nd waxing of Tabodwe 908 ME). The next day, Toungoo forces began their final push, driving out the Mrauk-U army from Launggyet and surrounding the heavily fortified Arakanese capital. They even breached the eastern outworks of Mrauk-U but were flooded out when Min Bin opened the sluices of the city's reservoirs. Unwilling to pursue a long siege, Tabinshwehti agreed to a truce with Min Bin on 30 January. Toungoo forces began their retreat three days later, and evacuated Thandwe on 26 March 1547 (5th waxing of Late Tagu 908 ME). After the war, he sent a force to drive out Tripuri marauders who were pillaging Ramu and Chittagong districts.

Despite the truce with Toungoo, Min Bin remained very much concerned about the Toungoo threat for the remainder of his reign. He sent 3000 troops to aid King Sithu Kyawhtin of Ava, the enemy of Toungoo, put down rebellions.

== Government ==
His eldest son Dikkha was the heir apparent throughout the reign. At his accession, Min Bin appointed his brother Min Aung Hla as governor of Thandwe (Sandoway), the second most important city in the kingdom. But he later appointed one of his sons, styled as Upayaza Min (ဥပရာဇာမင်း), at Thandwe. According to Burmese chronicles, Aung Hla was unhappy and sought help from Toungoo, which led to Toungoo's invasion (1545–1547). However Arakanese chronicles disagree that Aung Hla ever betrayed his brother.

== Death ==
Min Bin died on 11 January 1554 (8th waning of Tabodwe 915 ME). He was succeeded by heir-apparent Dikkha.

== Bibliography ==
- Gutman, Pamela (2001). Burma's Lost Kingdoms: Splendours of Arakan. Bangkok: Orchid Press. ISBN 974-8304-98-1.
- Harvey, G. E. (1925). History of Burma: From the Earliest Times to 10 March 1824. London: Frank Cass & Co. Ltd.
- Htin Aung, Maung (1967). A History of Burma. New York and London: Cambridge University Press.
- James, Helen (2004). "Arakan". In Ooi, Keat Gin (ed.). Southeast Asia: a historical encyclopedia, from Angkor Wat to East Timor, Volume 2. ABC-CLIO. ISBN 1-57607-770-5.
- Myanma Swezon Kyan (in Burmese). Vol. 11 (1 ed.). Yangon: Sarpay Beikman. 1970.
- Myint-U, Thant (2006). The River of Lost Footsteps—Histories of Burma. Farrar, Straus and Giroux. ISBN 978-0-374-16342-6.
- Phayre, Lt. Gen. Sir Arthur P. (1883). History of Burma (1967 ed.). London: Susil Gupta.
- Royal Historical Commission of Burma (1832). Hmannan Yazawin (in Burmese). Vol. 1–3 (2003 ed.). Yangon: Ministry of Information, Myanmar.
- Sandamala Linkara, Ashin (1931). Rakhine Yazawinthit Kyan (in Burmese). Vol. 1–2 (1997–1999 ed.). Yangon: Tetlan Sarpay.
- Seekins, Donald M. (2006). Historical dictionary of Burma (Myanmar), vol. 59 of Asian/Oceanian historical dictionaries. Vol. 59 (Illustrated ed.). Sacredcrow Press. ISBN 978-0-8108-5476-5.
- Topich, William J.; Keith A. Leitich (2013). The History of Myanmar. ABC-CLIO. ISBN 9780313357244.

Min Bin Mrauk-U Kingdom Born: c. February 1493 Died: 11 January 1554
Regnal titles
Preceded by Minkhaung	King of Mrauk-U; 27 May 1531 – 11 January 1554	Succeeded by Dikkha
Royal titles
Preceded by	Governor of Thandwe; 1521–1527	Succeeded by Min Aung Hla
