= 1513 =

1513 in various calendars
- Gregorian calendar: 1513; MDXIII
- Ab urbe condita: 2266
- Armenian calendar: 962; ԹՎ ՋԿԲ
- Assyrian calendar: 6263
- Balinese saka calendar: 1434–1435
- Bengali calendar: 919–920
- Berber calendar: 2463
- English Regnal year: 4 Hen. 8 – 5 Hen. 8
- Buddhist calendar: 2057
- Burmese calendar: 875
- Byzantine calendar: 7021–7022
- Chinese calendar: 壬申年 (Water Monkey); 4210 or 4003 — to — 癸酉年 (Water Rooster); 4211 or 4004
- Coptic calendar: 1229–1230
- Discordian calendar: 2679
- Ethiopian calendar: 1505–1506
- Hebrew calendar: 5273–5274
- Hindu calendars
- Vikram Samvat: 1569–1570
- Shaka Samvat: 1434–1435
- Kali Yuga: 4613–4614
- Holocene calendar: 11513
- Igbo calendar: 513–514
- Iranian calendar: 891–892
- Islamic calendar: 918–919
- Japanese calendar: Eishō 10 (永正１０年)
- Javanese calendar: 1430–1431
- Julian calendar: 1513; MDXIII
- Korean calendar: 3846
- Minguo calendar: 399 before ROC 民前399年
- Nanakshahi calendar: 45
- Thai solar calendar: 2055–2056
- Tibetan calendar: ཆུ་ཕོ་སྤྲེ་ལོ་ (male Water-Monkey); 1639 or 1258 or 486 — to — ཆུ་མོ་བྱ་ལོ་ (female Water-Bird); 1640 or 1259 or 487

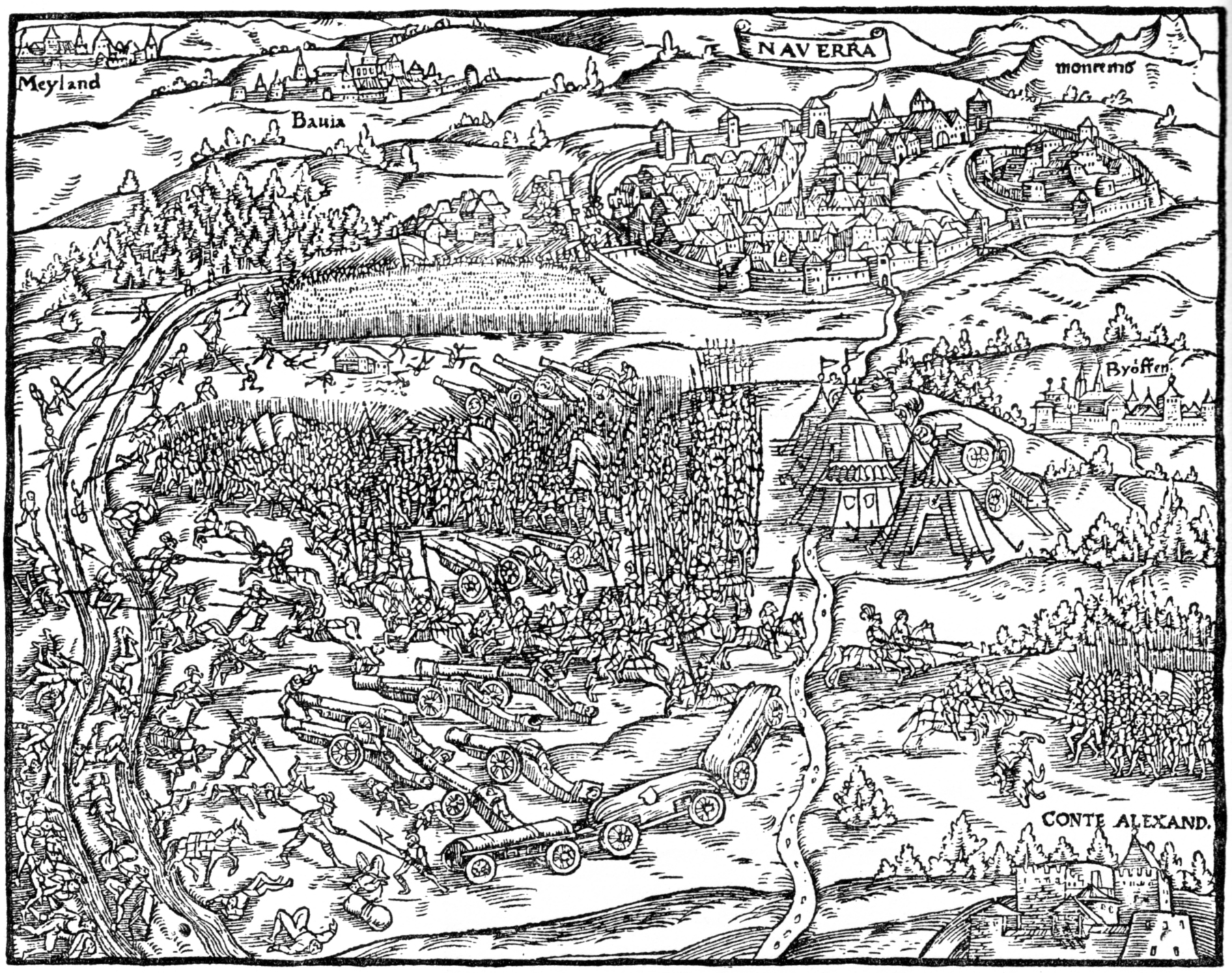
June 6: Swiss mercenaries drive French out of Milan in Battle of Novara.

Year 1513 (MDXIII) was a common year starting on Saturday of the Julian calendar.

== Events ==
=== January–March ===
- January 20 – Italian conquistador Vasco Núñez de Balboa writes a letter to King Ferdinand II of Aragon advocating genocide against the native peoples of the Caribbean islands, and begins the killing of hundreds of residents of Caribbean villages.
- February 18 – Pope Julius II issues the papal bull Exigit contumaciam, declaring queen Catherine of Navarre and king John III of Navarre to be heretics for their refusal to participate with other Roman Catholic nations in the anti-French Holy League of 1511.
- February 20 – Hans, King of Denmark dies at the age of 58 from injuries sustained in being thrown from a horse. He is succeeded by his 32-year-old son Christian II as ruler of Denmark-Norway.
- February 21 – Pope Julius II dies in Rome.
- March 4 – The conclave of the Roman Catholic Cardinals begins at the Niccoline Chapel in the Apostolic Palace in Rome, with 25 of the 31 Cardinals participating. In the first round of balloting, none of the Cardinals receives the required 17 votes necessary for a three-fourth's majority, though Cardinal Jaime Serra I Cau of Spain, Bishop of Albano, receives 13.
- March 9 – Cardinal Giovanni di Lorenzo de' Medici, the Apostolic Administrator of Amalfi but not ordained as a priest, is selected to succeed the late Pope Julius II as the 217th Pope of the Roman Catholic Church. After two days, the selection is announced to the public and Medici takes the name of Pope Leo X, despite a strong challenge by Italian cardinal Raffaele Riario and his group of seniors, or cardinals that were elected by Sixtus IV and Innocent VIII, who are opposed to the relatively newer juniors that includes Medici.
- March 15 – In the Taino Rebellion on the island of Puerto Rico, Spanish conquistador Diego Guilarte de Salazar attacks the Taino towns of Yauco and Coxiguex.
- March 23 – At Blois, king Louis XII concludes a new alliance with the Republic of Venice, while the doge Leonardo Loredan ratifies the same Franco-Venetian treaty on April 12.
- March 26 – On Easter Sunday, Afonso de Albuquerque, Governor of Portuguese India, makes an unsuccessful attempt to capture the port city of Aden, on the Arabian Peninsula, from the Mamluk Sultanate, using 20 ships and 2,500 soldiers. The 1,700 Portuguese, along with 800 mercenaries from Malabar, lose at least 100 killed during the attack and retreat.
- March 27 – Juan Ponce de León becomes the first European definitely known to sight Florida, mistaking it for another island.

=== April–June ===
- April 2 – Juan Ponce de León and his expedition become the first Europeans known to visit Florida, landing somewhere on the east coast. One of the expedition, Juan Garrido, becomes the first African known to visit North America.
- May 25 – Giano II di Campofregoso resigns as Doge of the Republic of Genoa as plots by two opposing families restore the influence of France. Campogregoso leaves the city on a ship to serve the Republic of Venice in its war against the Duchy of Milan.
- May – Portuguese explorer Jorge Álvares and his crew land on Lintin Island, in the Pearl River estuary, near Guangzhou, becoming the first Europeans to arrive in China by sea.
- June 6 – Italian Wars: Battle of Novara – Swiss mercenaries supporting the Milanese defeat the French under Louis II de la Trémoille, forcing the French to abandon the Duchy of Milan and Italy.
- June 20 – Ottaviano Fregoso becomes the new Doge of the Republic of Genoa, replacing Giano II di Campofregoso.
- June 28 – Pope Leo X sends a letter to Scotland's King James IV, threatening him with ecclesiastical censure or excommunication for breaking his peace treaties with England.

=== July–September ===
- July 22 – Christian II becomes King of Denmark-Norway.
- July 25 – Scotland's Earl of Arran departs from the Firth of Forth with 22 ships on a plan to join France in cutting off England's communications with the rest of Europe.
- August 5 – A force of 7,000 Scottish border troops, commanded by Lord Home, invades England and begins the destruction and pillaging of villages in Northumberland.
- August 23 – Thérouanne in the north of France is given to Henry VIII of England after a treaty is concluded in the aftermath of the Battle of the Spurs.
- August 16
  - Battle of Dubica (part of the Hundred Years' Croatian–Ottoman War): Croatian troops under Petar Berislavić, Ban (Viceroy) of Croatia, defeat an Ottoman army under Sanjak-bey Junuz-aga.
  - Battle of the Spurs (or Battle of Guinegate, part of the War of the League of Cambrai): English and allied troops under Henry VIII defeat French cavalry under Marshal La Palice.
- September 9
  - Battle of Flodden: King James IV of Scotland is defeated and killed by an English army under Thomas Howard, Earl of Surrey. James's infant son, the Duke of Rothesay, becomes James V, King of Scots. At least 5,000 Scots and 1,500 English troops are killed.
  - Johann Reuchlin is summoned for an inquisition trial, initiated by Jacob van Hoogstraaten. The verdict of the trial is never revealed, as when it is about to be announced on October 12, the archbishop of Mainz orders the court to go into recess on threat of resigning the court, and the trial never continues. Eventually, in March 1514, an ecclesiastical court presided over by George, Bishop of Speyer clears Reuchlin of any charges and orders Hoogstraten to pay the cost of 111 guldens, although this is overturned by Leo X in a papal decision in 1520.
- September 19 – Upon confirming that King James IV of Scotland has been killed in battle, the 35 Lords of Council of the Realm meet at Stirling Castle and agree to rule Scotland in the name of James's widow, Margaret Tudor, and his son, the infant James V.
- September 25 – Vasco Núñez de Balboa first sees what will become known as the Pacific Ocean from the Isthimus of Darién. This moment is later referenced in a poem by John Keats called "On First Looking into Chapman's Homer" with the line "silent upon a peak in Darién" although he mistakenly references Hernán Cortés as the one who saw the Pacific from Darién.
- September 30 – A major rock avalanche occurs in the Southern side of the Swiss Alps at Monte Crenone, which destroys the village of Biasca, floods Bellinzona, and forms a lake of 390 m.a.s.l.
- September – The dispute between Johann Reuchlin and Johannes Pfefferkorn concerning the Talmud and other Jewish books, is referred to Pope Leo X.

=== October–December ===
- October 7 – Battle of La Motta (War of the League of Cambrai): Spanish and imperial troops under Ramón de Cardona decisively defeat those of the Republic of Venice under Bartolomeo d'Alviano in Schio.
- October 17 – At Edirne, the Ottoman sultan Selim II confirms the renewal of peace treaties with Venice, under terms that are accepted by the Venetian government on December 3.
- October 21 – The coronation of James V, 17 months old, as King of Scotland takes place in the Chapel Royal at Stirling Castle.
- November 5 – Pope Leo X issues the decree Dum suavissimos, reviving Sapienza University of Rome.
- November – Gazapati, becomes the new King of Burma as his father, King Raza, abdicates the throne at the capital of Arakan, Mrauk U.
- December 17
  - The Canton of Appenzell becomes a member of the Swiss Confederacy.
  - Louis XII makes peace with the Papal States by issuing a decree disavowing the Council of Pisa and promising his future adherence to the Lateran Council.
- December – Louis attempts to make peace with Spain by offering King Ferdinand the hand of his daughter Renée for one of his grandsons along with renouncing his claims on Naples. The proposal is never accepted.

=== Undated ===
- Niccolò Machiavelli is suspected of trying to overthrow the House of Medici and is arrested and tortured. He is soon after released and moves to his farm in San Casciano, and writes The Prince.
- Leo Africanus visits Timbuktu, second city of the Songhai Empire.
- Paracelsus begins studying at Ferrara University.

== Births ==
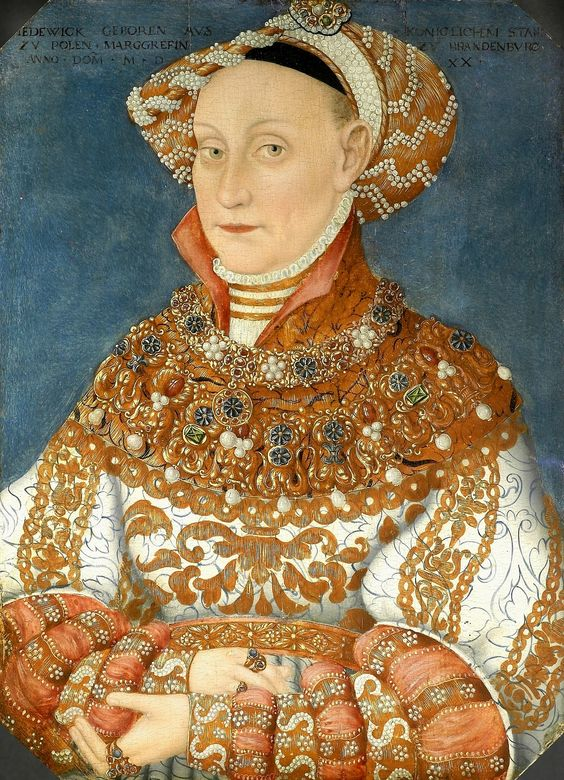
Hedwig Jagiellon, Electress of Brandenburg

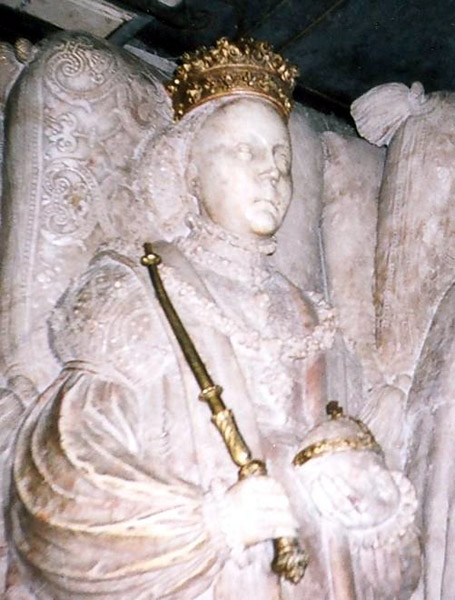
Catherine of Saxe-Lauenburg

- February 14 – Domenico Ferrabosco, Italian composer (d. 1573)
- March 15 – Hedwig Jagiellon, Electress of Brandenburg (d. 1573)
- April 22 – Tachibana Dōsetsu, Japanese Daimyō (d. 1585)
- June 10 – Louis, Duke of Montpensier (1561–1582) (d. 1582)
- August 3 – John, Margrave of Brandenburg-Küstrin (d. 1571)
- September 23 – Hans Buser, Swiss noble (d. 1544)
- September 24 – Catherine of Saxe-Lauenburg, queen of Gustav I of Sweden (d. 1535)
- October 30 – Jacques Amyot, French writer (d. 1593)
- December 3 – Lorenzo Strozzi, Italian Catholic cardinal (d. 1571)
- December 23 – Thomas Smith, English scholar and diplomat (d. 1577)
- date unknown
  - Abe Motozane, Japanese general (d. 1587)
  - Anna Hogenskild, Swedish lady-in-waiting (d. 1590)
  - Michael Baius, Belgian theologian (d. 1589)
  - George Cassander, Flemish theologian (d. 1566)
  - Thomas FitzGerald, 10th Earl of Kildare (d. 1537)
  - Elisabeth Plainacher, Austrian alleged witch (d. 1583)

== Deaths ==
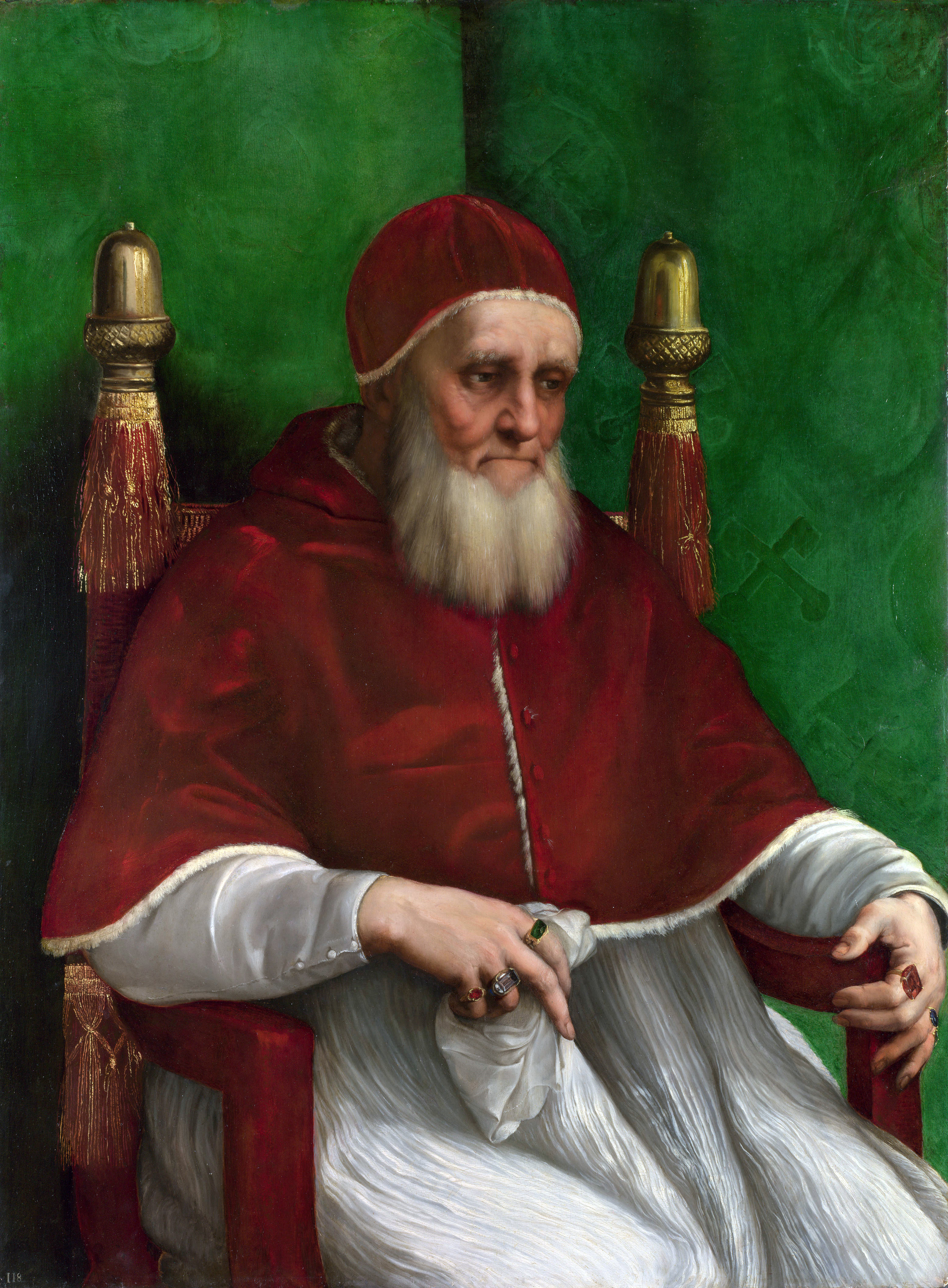
Pope Julius II

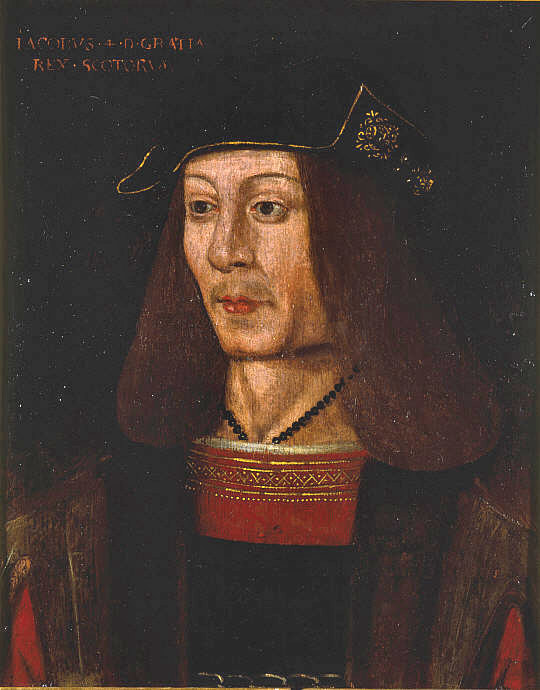
James IV of Scotland

- January – Hans Folz, German author (b. c. 1437)
- January 20 – Helena of Moscow, Grand Duchess consort of Lithuania and queen consort of Poland (b. 1476)
- February 20 – Hans, King of Denmark (also king of Norway and former king of Sweden) (b. 1455)
- February 21 – Pope Julius II (b. 1443)
- March 10 – John de Vere, 13th Earl of Oxford, English general (b. 1443)
- April 24 – Şehzade Ahmet, oldest son of Sultan Bayezid II (executed) (b. 1465)
- April 30 – Edmund de la Pole, 3rd Duke of Suffolk, Duke of Suffolk (b. 1471)
- August 3 – Ernst II of Saxony, Archbishop of Magdeburg (1476–1513) and Administrator of Halberstadt (b. 1464)
- September 9 (killed at the Battle of Flodden)
  - James IV of Scotland (b. 1473)
  - George Douglas, Master of Angus (b. 1469)
  - William Douglas of Glenbervie (b. 1473)
  - William Graham, 1st Earl of Montrose, Scottish politician (b. 1464)
  - George Hepburn, Scottish bishop
  - Adam Hepburn, 2nd Earl of Bothwell, Scottish politician, Lord High Admiral of Scotland
  - Adam Hepburn of Craggis
  - David Kennedy, 1st Earl of Cassilis, Scottish soldier (b. 1478)
  - Alexander Lauder of Blyth, Scottish politician
  - Alexander Stewart, Scottish archbishop (b. 1493)
  - Matthew Stewart, 2nd Earl of Lennox, Scottish politician (b. 1488)
- October 27 – George Manners, 11th Baron de Ros, English nobleman
- date unknown
  - Claudine de Brosse, duchess Consort of Savoy (b. 1450)
  - Hua Sui, Chinese inventor and printer (b. 1439)
