= Min Saw O =

Min Saw O မင်းစောအို

King of Arakan
- Reign: January 1515 – July 1515
- Predecessor: Gazapati
- Successor: Thazata
- Born: January 1456; Mrauk-U
- Died: July 1515 (aged 59); Wagaung 877 ME; Mrauk-U
- Consort: Taung-Nan Mibara
Names
- Min Saw O (မင်းစောအို); Jalal Shah (ဇလသျှာ)
- Religion: Theravada Buddhism

Min Saw O (Burmese: မင်းစောအို, Burmese pronunciation: [mɪ́ɴ sɔ́ ò]; Arakanese pronunciation: [máɴ sɔ́ ò]; 1456–1515) was king of Arakan for six months in 1515. He was a brother of King Salingathu (r. 1494–1502).

== Reign ==
The king was also referred to as Jalal Shah by the neighbouring Bengal.

Saw O was put on the throne by the ministers of the court who had beheaded his grandnephew King Gazapati.

He came to the throne at an old age, his notable religious work was Thet-daw shay Pagoda meaning 'long life' was built during his short reign. 50 feet Pagoda stands on the hill named Ywetkartaung west of the royal palace, the project was left unfinished and did not complete until the reign of Minkhaung of Mrauk-U who completed and worshipped in 1525 (877 ME).

== Death ==
Saw O died only after six months of reign in July 1515.

== Bibliography ==
- Sandamala Linkara, Ashin (1931). Rakhine Yazawinthit Kyan (in Burmese). Vol. 1–2 (1997–1999 ed.). Yangon: Tetlan Sarpay.

Min Saw O Mrauk-U Kingdom Born: January 1456 Died: July 1515
Regnal titles
Preceded by Gazapati	King of Mrauk-U; January 1515 – July 1515	Succeeded by Thazata
