= Andaw-thein Temple =

Buddhist temple in Mrauk U, Myanmar

Andaw-Thein Temple အံတော်သိမ်ဘုရား
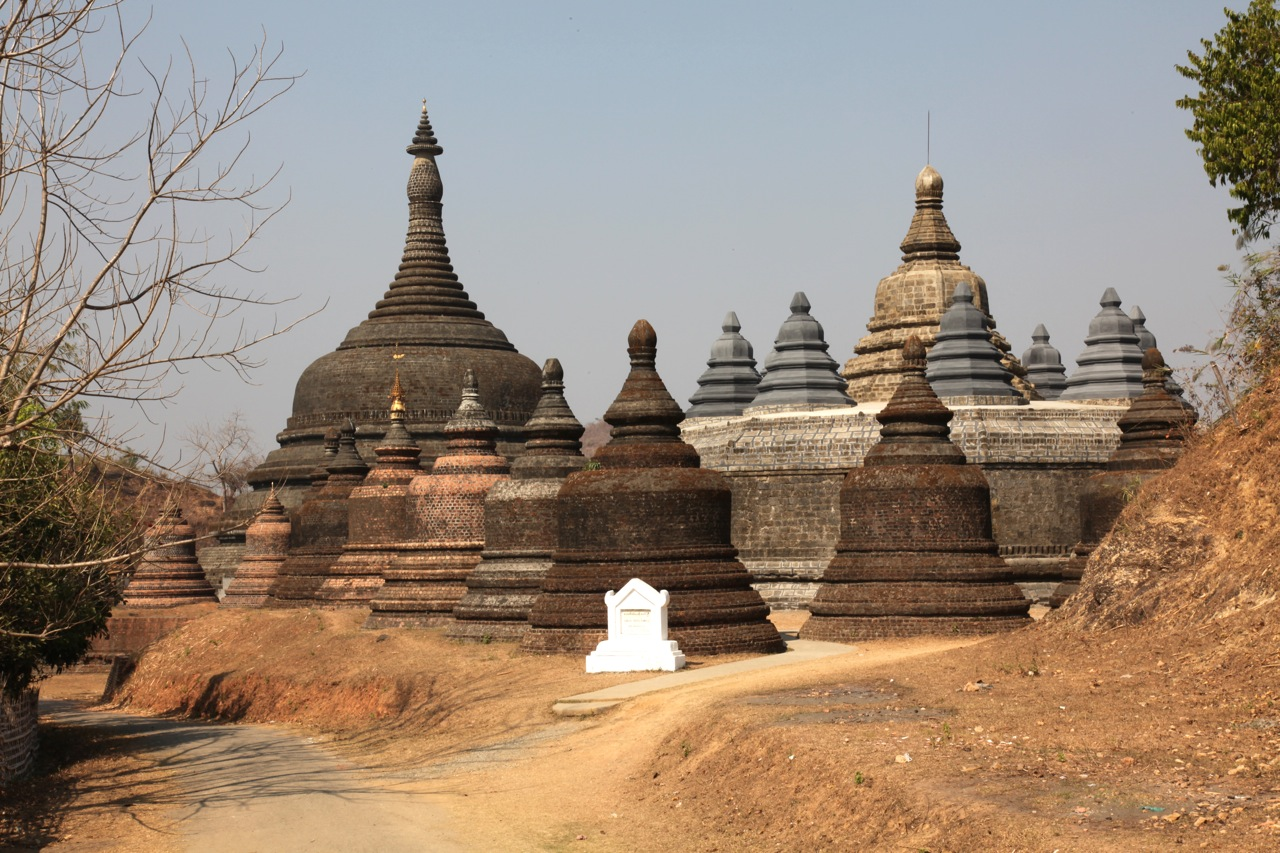
- The Andaw Thein Ordination Hall and Temple

- Location within Burma

Religion
- Affiliation: Theravada

Location
- Country: Myanmar
- Coordinates: 20°35′53.9″N 93°11′37.4″E

Architecture
- Founder: Thazata (ordination hall); Raza II (temple)
- Completed: 1515–1521 (ordination hall); 1607 (temple)

Andaw Thein (Burmese: အံတော်သိမ်ဘုရား amtau sim bhu.ra:, Burmese pronunciation: [àɰ̃dɔ̀ θèiɰ̃ pʰəjá] Añṯotheiñ hpăyà) is a Buddhist temple in Mrauk U located at the northeast corner of the Shite-thaung Temple. The name means 'Tooth Shrine'. It contains a tooth relic of the Buddha brought over from Sri Lanka. It was first built as an ordination hall between 1515 and 1521 by King Thazata, and restored by Min Bin between 1534 and 1542. It was later expanded into a temple by King Raza II in order to house a tooth relic of the Buddha he brought back from his pilgrimage to Ceylon, either in 1596 or 1606–1607. (Note: (Gutman 2001: 112) says he rebuilt the Andaw Thein in 1596 after the Ceylon trip. But chronicles (Sandamala Linkara Vol. 2 1999: 84) mention just one pilgrimage to Ceylon, leaving for the island state in Tazaungmon 968 ME (31 October 1606 to 28 November 1606). This means he probably had the structure enlarged in 1607.)

== History ==
The temple was originally built by King Thazata between 1515 and 1521 and later restored by King Ming Phalaung between 1534 and 1542. In 1596, King Min Razagyi further renovated it to enshrine a sacred tooth relic of the Buddha, said to have been brought from Sri Lanka.

According to Forchammer, a Bengali man from Allayse village near Mrauk-U broke into the relic chamber and stole a golden casket containing the sacred tooth. However, the Myo-ok of Mrauk-U managed to recover the tooth, though the casket was lost. The relic was then placed in a silver case. The tooth measures 3¼ inches in length and is nearly as thick.

== Architecture ==
The Andaw Thein Temple is also known as the "Tooth Shrine". It is located near the northwest corner of the Shite-thaung Temple (another temple in Mrauk U).

The temple features an octagonal central shrine with two concentric octagonal passageways. It sits on a base measuring 125 feet from north to south and 120 feet from east to west. Surrounding the temple there are sixteen smaller shrines, each housing a Buddha image, are positioned at the northwest and southwest corners. A large prayer hall was later added to the eastern entrance.

The temple has entrances on the east, north, and south sides. Each entrance is accompanied by three niches in the wall, which are 6 feet high, 2 feet wide, and just over a foot deep. The main shrine is topped by a bell-shaped stupa with a segmented dome, similar in style to early Mrauk-U temples. Around it, eight identical stupas stand at each corner.

The temple has very limited openings, with no light or air entering except through the main entrance. Its inner structure, built entirely from stone blocks, resembles the fortress-like design of the Shite-thaung Temple.

== Statues and historical relics in the temple ==
In the large prayer hall of Andaw Thein Temple, six standing Buddha images are placed in niches at the entrance of the main shrine. Each Buddha displays a different mudra (hand gesture). On either side of the entrance, two Buddha images combine Abhaya and Varada Mudras raising the right hand with the palm facing outward while the left hand is bent in a similar way. This represents the Buddha's descent from the heaven of thirty-three gods.

The Buddha statues have broad faces, slightly bent heads, and downcast eyes in contemplation. Their long ears nearly reach their shoulders, and their bodies appear strong with wide chests and heavy limbs. Most are seated in Virasana, with the right leg over the left and the right hand touching the ground in Bhumisparsha Mudra.

In total, there are 175 Buddha images in Andaw Thein.

=== Presence of the reliefs of Hindu gods and different animals ===
In the central shrine of Andaw Thein, eight types of thrones display intricate carvings of both Buddhist and Hindu figures are found. Among them, reliefs of Ganesh, Shiva, Brahma, Garuda, ogres, Hamsa birds, sphinxes, and lions are found across different levels of the thrones. Shiva appears seated cross-legged, holding lotus buds, while Brahma is depicted with an ornate headdress, earrings, and a string of beads, an unusual portrayal in a Buddhist temple. A striking relief of Garuda stands between two thrones, wings spread wide, while the presence of guardian figures and elephants further enhances the temple's artistic richness.

Additionally, the thrones feature floral motifs, Rakhine Byala (a mythical creature), kalasa pots, and parrot carvings which blends both Hindu and Buddhist influences. A relief likely depicting Shiva with two consorts, hands pressed together in a gesture of respect, is placed between Buddha images which is an unusual sight in a Buddhist temple.

== See also ==
- Shite-thaung Temple
- Htukkanthein Temple
- Le-myet-hna Temple
- Ratanabon Pagoda
- List of Buddhist temples in Myanmar

== Bibliography ==
- Gutman, Pamela (2001). Burma's Lost Kingdoms: Splendours of Arakan. Bangkok: Orchid Press. ISBN 974-8304-98-1.
- Sandamala Linkara, Ashin (1931). Rakhine Yazawinthit Kyan (in Burmese). Vol. 1–2 (1997–1999 ed.). Yangon: Tetlan Sarpay.
