= Thazata =

Thazata သဇာတ
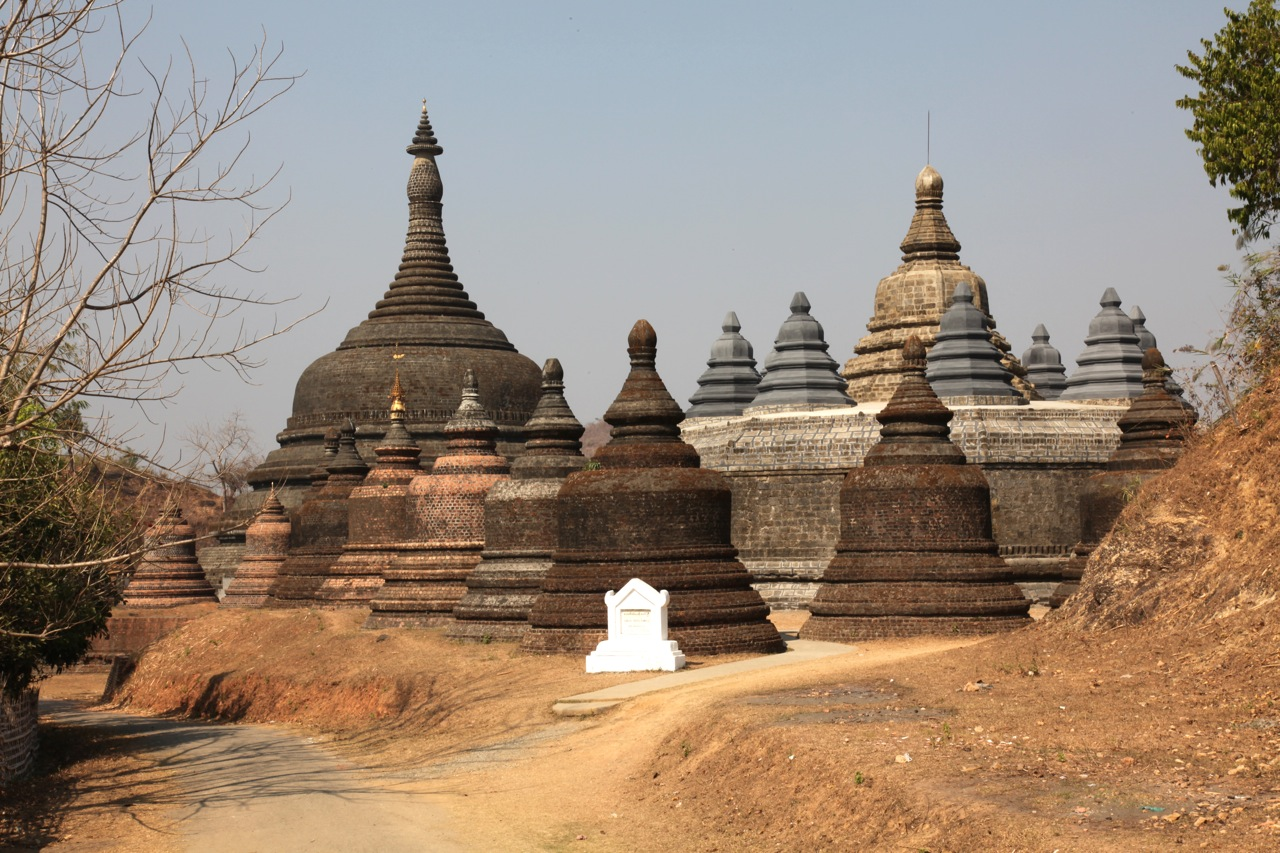
- The Andaw-thein Ordination Hall built by King Thazata

King of Arakan
- Reign: July 1515 – c. April 1521
- Predecessor: Saw O
- Successor: Minkhaung
- Born: c. February 1464 (Thursday born); Mrauk-U
- Died: c. April 1521 (aged 57); Daingkyi?
- Consort: Saw Nan-Hset
Names
- Thazata (သဇာတ); Ali Shah (ဣလိသျှာ)
- Father: Dawlya
- Mother: Saw Ru Saw
- Religion: Theravada Buddhism

Thazata (Burmese: သဇာတ, Burmese pronunciation: [θəzàta̰]; 1464–1521) was king of Arakan from 1515 to 1521. He was a son of King Dawlya (r. 1482–1492), and governor of Ramree when he was selected by the ministers to succeed King Saw O. He moved the palace from Mrauk-U to a place called Daingkyi. He died in 1521. He was also known as Ali Shah by the neighbouring Bengal.

He built the Andaw-thein Ordination Hall.

== Bibliography ==
- Gutman, Pamela (2001). Burma's Lost Kingdoms: Splendours of Arakan. Bangkok: Orchid Press. ISBN 974-8304-98-1.
- Sandamala Linkara, Ashin (1931). Rakhine Yazawinthit Kyan (in Burmese). Vol. 1–2 (1997–1999 ed.). Yangon: Tetlan Sarpay.

Thazata Mrauk-U Kingdom Born: c. February 1464 Died: c. April 1521
Regnal titles
Preceded by Saw O	King of Mrauk-U; July 1515 – c. April 1521	Succeeded by Minkhaung
