= List of Burmese monarchs =

King of Burma
- Burmese Green Peacock

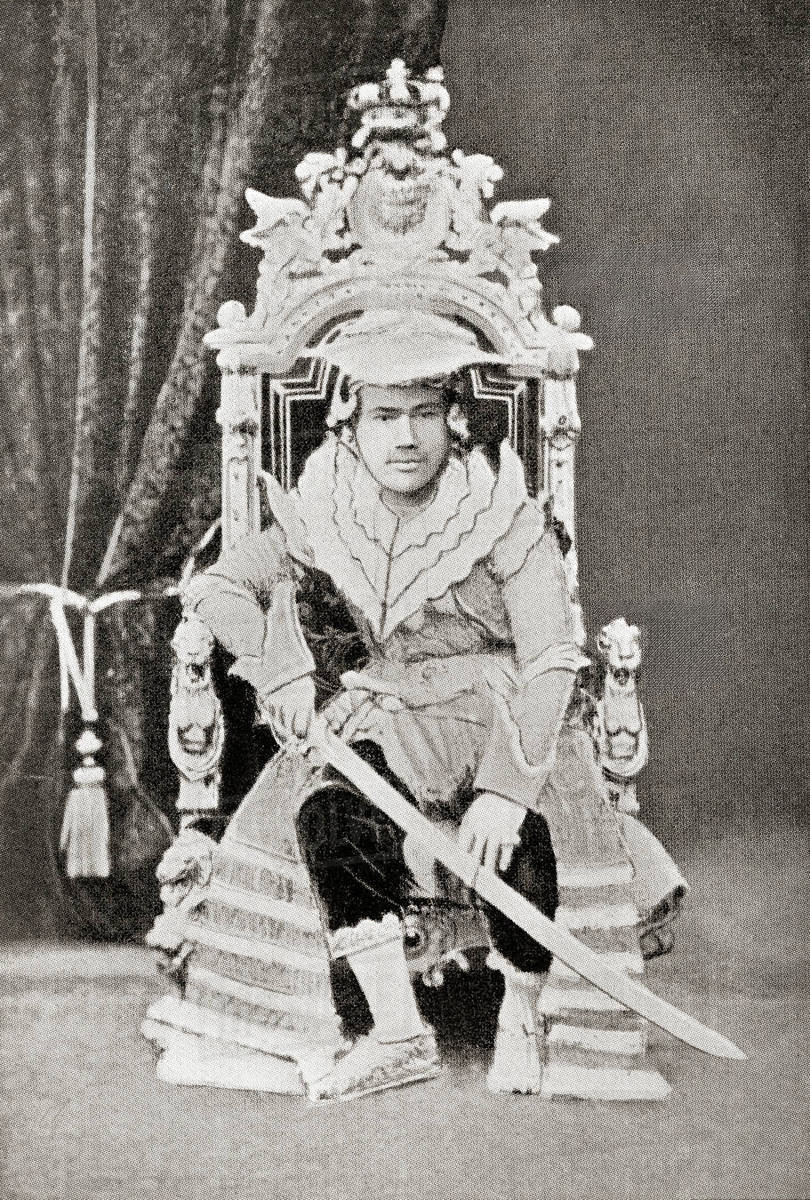
- Last to reign: Thibaw Min; 1 October 1878 – 30 November 1885

Details
- Style: His Majesty
- First monarch: Abhiyaza
- Last monarch: Thibaw Min
- Formed: 850 BCE
- Abolished: 29 November 1885
- Pretenders: Richard Taw Phaya Myat Gyi; Soe Win

This is a list of the monarchs of Burma (Myanmar), covering the monarchs of all the major kingdoms that existed in the present-day Burma (Myanmar). Although Burmese chronicle tradition maintains that various monarchies of Burma (Mon, Burman, Arakanese), began in the 9th century BCE, historically verified data date back only to 1044 CE at the accession of Anawrahta of Pagan. The farther away the data are from 1044, the less verifiable they are. For example, the founding of the city of Pagan (Bagan) in the 9th century is verifiable–although the accuracy of the actual date, given in the Chronicles as 849, remains in question–but the founding of early Pagan dynasty, given as the 2nd century, is not. For early kingdoms, see List of early and legendary monarchs of Burma.

The reign dates follow the latest available dates as discussed in each section.

== Pagan (849–1297) ==
=== Early Pagan (to 1044) ===
Below is a partial list of early Pagan kings as reported by the four major chronicles. Prior to Anawrahta, inscriptional evidence exists thus far only for Nyaung-u Sawrahan and Kunhsaw Kyaunghpyu. The list starts from Pyinbya, the fortifier of Pagan (Bagan) according to Hmannan. The Zatadawbon Yazawin is considered the most accurate chronicle for the Pagan period.

Name	Reign per Zatadawbon Yazawin	Reign per Maha Yazawin	Reign per Yazawin Thit and Hmannan Yazawin	Relationship with predecessor(s)
Pyinbya	846–886	846–858	846–878	Brother
Tannet	886–904	858–876	878–906	Son
Sale Ngahkwe	904–934	876–901	906–915	Usurper
Theinhko	934–956	901–917	915–931	Son
Nyaung-u Sawrahan	956–1001	917–950	931–964	Usurper
Kunhsaw Kyaunghpyu	1001–1021	950–971	964–986	Son of Tannet
Kyiso	1021–1038	971–977	986–992	Son of Nyaung-u Sawrahan
Sokkate	1038–1044	977–1002	992–1017	Brother

=== Pagan Empire ===
The list generally follows the chronicle reported order and reign dates. G.H. Luce does not recognize Naratheinkha, and proposes an interregnum of nine years between 1165 and 1174. But Luce's gap has been rigorously questioned. Moreover, Luce proposes that Naratheinga Uzana was king between 1231 and 1235 but it too is not universally accepted.

Name	Portrait	Reign from	Reign until	Relationship with predecessor(s)
Anawrahta		11 August 1044	11 April 1077	Son of Kunhsaw Kyaunghpyu
Saw Lu		11 April 1077	c. 21 April 1084	Son
Kyansittha		21 April 1084	1112/13	Half-brother
Sithu I		1112/13	1167	Grandson
Min Shin Saw (Consecrated)		1167	1167	Son
Narathu		1167	c. February 1171	Son
Naratheinkha		c. February 1171	c. May 1174	Son
Sithu II		c. May 1174	18 August 1211	Brother
Htilominlo		18 August 1211	19 July 1235	Son
Naratheinga Uzana (as regent)		c. 1231?/35	19 July 1235	Son
Kyaswa		19 July 1235	c. May 1251	Son of Htilominlo
Uzana		c. May 1251	c. 6 May 1256	Son
Narathihapate		6 May 1256	1 July 1287	Son
Interregnum (1287–1289)
Kyawswa		30 May 1289	17 December 1297	Son

== Lesser kingdoms ==
=== Myinsaing (1297–1313) ===
All main chronicles prior to Hmannan Yazawin say that the co-regency ended in 674 ME (1312/13) but Hmannan says it ended in 672 ME (1310/11). Inscriptional evidence shows that the first brother died on 13 April 1310 but the second brother was still alive.

Name	Portrait	Reign from	Reign until	Relationship with predecessor(s)
Athinkhaya; Yazathingyan; Thihathu		17 December 1297	13 April 1310	Founders, brothers and co-regents
Yazathingyan; Thihathu		13 April 1310	before 7 February 1313	Co-rulers

=== Pinya (1313–1364) ===
Most of the dates below are by Than Tun and Gordon Luce who had checked the chronicle reported dates with inscriptions. Myinsaing Sithu does not appear in any of the chronicles.

Name	Portrait	Reign from	Reign until	Relationship with predecessor(s)
Thihathu		7 February 1313	c. February 1325	Brother of Athinkhaya and Yazathingyan
Uzana I		c. February 1325	1 September 1340	Adopted son of Thihathu; Son of Kyawswa of Pagan
Sithu (as regent)		1 September 1340	29 March 1344	Maternal uncle?
Kyawswa I (Thihathu II)		29 March 1344	12 December 1350	Nephew and son-in-law
Kyawswa II		12 December 1350	19 March 1359	Son
Narathu of Pinya (Thihathu III)		19 March 1359	June 1364	Brother
Uzana II		June 1364	September 1364	Brother

=== Sagaing (1315–1364) ===
Name	Portrait	Reign from	Reign until	Relationship with predecessor(s)
Saw Yun		15 May 1315	5 February 1327	Son of Thihathu
Tarabya I		5 February 1327	1335/36	Maternal half-brother
Shwetaungtet		1335/36	c. August 1339	Son
Kyaswa of Sagaing		c. August 1339	c. March 1349	Son of Saw Yun
Nawrahta Minye		c. April 1349	c. November 1349	Brother
Tarabya II		c. November 1349	23 February 1352	Brother
Minbyauk Thihapate		23 February 1352	April 1364	Brother-in-law

=== Ava (1364–1555) ===
Different Burmese chronicles give similar but not identical dates for the regnal dates of the Ava period. The following table largely follows the dates given in Hmannan Yazawin and the table of regnal dates given in (Maha Yazawin Vol. 2 2006: 352–355). The regnal dates by G.E. Harvey (Harvey 1925: 366) for the most part are off by a year (a year later) than chronicle and inscriptionally-verified dates.

Name	Portrait	Reign from	Reign until	Relationship with predecessor(s)
Thado Minbya		April 1364	c. 3 September 1367	Grandson of Saw Yun
Swa Saw Ke		5 September 1367	April 1400	Grandson of Kyawswa of Pagan and grandnephew of Thihathu
Tarabya		April 1400	c. November 1400	Son
Minkhaung I		25 November 1400	c. October 1421	Half-brother
Thihathu		c. October 1421	August 1425	Son
Min Hla		August 1425	November 1425	Son
Kale Kye-Taung Nyo		by 9 November 1425	16 May 1426	Uncle
Mohnyin Thado		16 May 1426	April 1439	Descended from Kyawswa I of Pinya, Founder of Mohnyin Dynasty (မိုးညှင်းဆက်)
Minye Kyawswa I		by 26 April 1439	January 1442	Son
Narapati I		by 11 March 1442	24 July 1468	Brother
Thihathura I		24 July 1468	c. August 1480	Son
Minkhaung II		c. August 1480	7 April 1501	Son
Thihathura II		1485	4 March 1501	Son; Joint-king during Minkhaung II's reign
Narapati II		7 April 1501	14 March 1527	Son of Minkhaung II
Thohanbwa		14 March 1527	May 1542	Son of Sawlon I of Mohnyin
Hkonmaing		June 1542	c. September 1545	Saopha of Thibaw
Narapati III		c. September 1545	c. October 1551	Son
Narapati IV		c. October 1551	22 January 1555	Governor of Salin and Viceroy of Sagaing

=== Hanthawaddy (1287–1539, 1550–1552) ===
Name	Portrait	Reign from	Reign until	Relationship with predecessor(s)
Wareru		30 January 1287	c. 14 January 1307	Founder
Hkun Law		by 28 January 1307	March 1311	Brother
Saw O		10 April 1311	September 1323	Nephew
Saw Zein		by 28 September 1323	c. April 1330	Brother
Zein Pun		c. April 1330	c. April 1330	Usurper
Saw E		c. April 1330	c. June 1330	Nephew of Saw Zein
Binnya E Law		c. June 1330	1348	Uncle; Son of Hkun Law
Binnya U		1348	2 January 1384	Nephew; Son of Saw Zein
Maha Dewi (as regent)		by 28 October 1383	4 January 1384	Sister
Razadarit		4 January 1384	c. December 1421	Son of Binnya U; adopted son of Maha Dewi
Binnya Dhammaraza		by 29 December 1421	1424	Son
Binnya Ran I		1424	c. September 1446	Brother
Binnya Waru		c. September 1446	30 May 1451	Nephew
Binnya Kyan		30 May 1451	c. June 1453	Cousin; Son of Binnya Dhamaraza
Leik Munhtaw		c. June 1453	c. January 1454	Cousin; Son of Binnya Ran
Shin Sawbu		c. January 1454	1471	Aunt; Daughter of Razadarit
Dhammazedi		1471	1492	Son in law
Binnya Ran II		1492	1526	Son
Taka Yut Pi		1526	c. January 1539	Son
Toungoo rule (1539–1550)
Smim Sawhtut		June 1550	August 1550	Claimant to throne
Smim Htaw		August 1550	12 March 1552	Brother of Taka Yut Pi

=== Mrauk-U (1429–1785) ===
The reign dates are per the Arakanese chronicle Rakhine Razawin Thit (Sandamala Linkara Vol. 2 1931), converted into Western dates using (Eade 1989). The converted dates after 1582 are on the Gregorian calendar. (Some Arakanese chronicles state the foundation of the kingdom a year later, 1430. Moreover, the end of the kingdom is given per Burmese records, 2 January 1785. Arakanese records give a day earlier, 1 January 1785.)

Name	Portrait	Reign from	Reign until	Relationship with predecessor(s)
Saw Mon		18 April 1429	9 May 1433	Founder
Khayi		9 May 1433	c. January 1459	Brother
Ba Saw Phyu		c. January 1459	5 August 1482	Son
Dawlya		5 August 1482	c. February 1492	Son
Ba Saw Nyo		c. February 1492	c. January 1494	Uncle, son of Khayi
Ran Aung		c. January 1494	c. July 1494	Nephew, son of Dawlya
Salingathu		c. July 1494	February 1502	Maternal uncle
Raza		February 1502	c. November 1513	Son
Gazapati		c. November 1513	January 1515	Son
Saw O		January 1515	July 1515	Granduncle; brother of Salingathu
Thazata		July 1515	c. April 1521	Son of Dawlya
Minkhaung		c. April 1521	27 May 1531	Brother
Min Bin		27 May 1531	11 January 1554	Son of Min Raza
Dikkha		11 January 1554	6 March 1556	Son
Saw Hla		6 March 1556	24 July 1564	Son
Sekkya		24 July 1564	7 February 1572	Brother
Phalaung		7 February 1572	4 July 1593	Son of Min Bin
Razagri		4 July 1593	4 July 1612	Son
Khamaung		4 July 1612	14 May 1622	Son
Thiri Thudhamma		14 May 1622	31 May 1638	Son
Sanay		1 June 1638	26 June 1638	Son
Narapati		27 June 1638	3 December 1645	Great-grandson of Min Bin
Thado		3 December 1645	c. May 1652	Son
Sanda Thudhamma		c. May 1652	11 June 1674	Son
Thiri Thuriya		11 June 1674	16 April 1685	Son
Wara Dhammaraza		16 April 1685	20 June 1692	Brother
Muni Thudhammaraza		20 June 1692	20 December 1694	Elder brother
Sanda Thuriya I		20 December 1694	4 August 1696	Brother
Nawrahta		4 August 1696	18 August 1696	Son
Mayuppiya		18 August 1696	13 May 1697	Usurper
Kalamandat		16 May 1697	5 June 1698	Usurper
Naradipati I		5 June 1698	17 June 1700	Son of Sanda Thuriya
Sanda Wimala I		18 June 1700	30 March 1707	Grandson of Thado
Sanda Thuriya II		3 April 1707	September 1710	Grandson of Sanda Thudhamma
Interregnum ~2 months
Sanda Wizaya		November 1710	April 1731	Usurper
Sanda Thuriya III		April 1731	1734	Son-in-law
Naradipati II		1734	1735	Son
Narapawara		1735	September 1737	Usurper
Sanda Wizala		September 1737	25 March 1738	Cousin
Madarit		28 March 1738	6 February 1743	Brother
Nara Apaya		6 February 1743	28 October 1761	Uncle
Thirithu		28 October 1761	3 February 1762	Son
Sanda Parama		3 February 1762	1 May 1764	Brother
Apaya		1 May 1764	17 January 1774	Brother-in-law
Sanda Thumana		17 January 1774	5 May 1777	Brother-in-law
Sanda Wimala II		6 May 1777	5 June 1777	Usurper
Sanda Thaditha		5 June 1777	1 December 1782	Usurper
Maha Thammada		2 December 1782	2 January 1785	Nephew in-law

=== Prome (1482–1542) ===
See List of rulers of Prome for governors of Prome between the late Pagan and early Restored Toungoo periods.

Name	Portrait	Reign from	Reign until	Relationship with predecessor(s)
Thado Minsaw		1482	February 1527	Son of Narapati I of Ava
Bayin Htwe		February 1527	c. December 1532	Son
Narapati		c. December 1532	February 1539	Son
Minkhaung		February 1539	19 May 1542	Brother

== Toungoo Empire (1510–1752) ==
See List of rulers of Toungoo for the viceroys and governors of Toungoo between 1279 and 1612.

The following are based on the reign dates in the Burmese calendar given in Maha Yazawin and Hmannan Yazawin chronicles. (The converted dates after 1582 are on the Gregorian calendar. Some books, e.g., Than Tun's Royal Orders of Burma (1983–1990), use old-style Julian dates for the entire Toungoo period.)

Name	Portrait	Reign from	Reign until	Relationship with predecessor(s)
Mingyi Nyo		16 October 1510	24 November 1530	Founder
Tabinshwehti		24 November 1530	30 April 1550	Son
Bayinnaung		30 April 1550	10 October 1581	Brother-in-law
Nanda		10 October 1581	19 December 1599	Son; nephew of Tabinshwehti
Nyaungyan		19 December 1599	5 November 1605	Half-brother
Anaukpetlun		5 November 1605	9 July 1628	Son
Minye Deibba		9 July 1628	19 August 1629	Son
Thalun		19 August 1629	27 August 1648	Uncle
Pindale		27 August 1648	3 June 1661	Son
Pye		3 June 1661	14 April 1672	Brother
Narawara		14 April 1672	27 February 1673	Son
Minye Kyawhtin		27 February 1673	4 May 1698	Distant Brother; Grandson of King Thalun
Sanay		4 May 1698	22 August 1714	Son
Taninganway		22 August 1714	14 November 1733	Son
Mahadhammaraza Dipadi		14 November 1733	22 March 1752	Son

== Restored Hanthawaddy (1740–1757) ==
Name	Portrait	Reign from	Reign until	Relationship with predecessor(s)
Smim Htaw Buddhaketi		8 December 1740	January 1747	Cousin of Mahadhammaraza Dipadi
Binnya Dala		January 1747	6 May 1757	Father-in-law

== Konbaung Empire (1752–1885) ==
Name	Portrait	Reign from	Reign until	Relationship with predecessor(s)
Alaungpaya		29 February 1752	11 May 1760	Founder
Naungdawgyi		11 May 1760	28 November 1763	Eldest Son of Alaungpaya
Hsinbyushin		28 November 1763	10 June 1776	Brother of Naungdawgyi and Second eldest son of Alaungpaya
Singu		10 June 1776	6 February 1782	Son of Hsinbyushin
Phaungka		6 February 1782	11 February 1782	Son of Naungdawgyi and cousin brother of Singu
Bodawpaya		11 February 1782	5 June 1819	Uncle; Alaungpaya's fourth son
Bagyidaw		5 June 1819	30 April 1837	Grandson of Bodawpaya
Tharrawaddy		30 April 1837	17 November 1846	Brother of Bagyidaw and grandson of Bodawpaya
Pagan		17 November 1846	18 February 1853	Son of Tharrawaddy Min
Mindon		18 February 1853	1 October 1878	Half Brother of Pagan Min (son of Tharrawaddy Min)
Thibaw		1 October 1878	29 November 1885	Son of Mindon Min

== Pretenders to the Burmese throne since 1885 ==
=== Konbaung dynasty ===
- King Thibaw (1885–1916)
- Princess Myat Phaya Lat (1916–1956)
- Prince Taw Phaya (1956–2019) (son-in-law of Myat Phaya Lat)
- Richard Taw Phaya Myat Gyi (2019–present) (eldest son of Prince Taw Phaya)

Other pretenders

- Prince Soe Win (1947–present) (eldest son of Prince Taw Phaya Gyi, Prince Taw Phaya's older brother)

== See also ==
- Family tree of Burmese monarchs
- List of Burmese leaders
- List of Burmese royal consorts
- List of Arakanese monarchs
- List of rulers of Prome
- List of rulers of Toungoo
- List of heirs to the Burmese thrones

== Bibliography ==
- Aung-Thwin, Michael (1985). Pagan: The Origins of Modern Burma. Honolulu: University of Hawai'i Press. ISBN 0-8248-0960-2.
- Aung-Thwin, Michael (2005). The mists of Rāmañña: The Legend that was Lower Burma (illustrated ed.). Honolulu: University of Hawai'i Press. ISBN 9780824828868.
- Charney, Michael W. (2006). Powerful Learning: Buddhist Literati and the Throne in Burma's Last Dynasty, 1752–1885. Ann Arbor: University of Michigan.
- Eade, J.C. (1989). Southeast Asian Ephemeris: Solar and Planetary Positions, A.D. 638–2000. Ithaca: Cornell University. ISBN 0-87727-704-4.
- Hall, D.G.E. (1960). Burma (3rd ed.). Hutchinson University Library. ISBN 978-1-4067-3503-1.
- Harvey, G. E. (1925). History of Burma: From the Earliest Times to 10 March 1824. London: Frank Cass & Co. Ltd.
- Htin Aung, Maung (1967). A History of Burma. New York and London: Cambridge University Press.
- Htin Aung, Maung (1970). Burmese History before 1287: A Defence of the Chronicles. Oxford: The Asoka Society.
- Kala, U (1724). Maha Yazawin Gyi (in Burmese). Vol. 1–3 (2006, 4th printing ed.). Yangon: Ya-Pyei Publishing.
- Lieberman, Victor B. (2003). Strange Parallels: Southeast Asia in Global Context, c. 800–1830, volume 1, Integration on the Mainland. Cambridge University Press. ISBN 978-0-521-80496-7.
- Phayre, Lt. Gen. Sir Arthur P. (1883). History of Burma (1967 ed.). London: Susil Gupta.
- Royal Historians of Burma (c. 1680). U Hla Tin (Hla Thamein) (ed.). Zatadawbon Yazawin (1960 ed.). Historical Research Directorate of the Union of Burma.
- Royal Historical Commission of Burma (1832). Hmannan Yazawin (in Burmese). Vol. 1–3 (2003 ed.). Yangon: Ministry of Information, Myanmar.
- Sandamala Linkara, Ashin (1931). Rakhine Yazawinthit Kyan (in Burmese). Vol. 1–2 (1997 ed.). Yangon: Tetlan Sarpay.
- Than Tun (December 1959). "History of Burma: A.D. 1300–1400". Journal of Burma Research Society. XLII (II).
- Than Tun (1964). Studies in Burmese History (in Burmese). Vol. 1. Yangon: Maha Dagon.
