= Shite-thaung Temple =

Notable Buddhist temple in Mrauk U, Myanmar

Shaitthaung Temple ရှစ်သောင်းဘုရား Temple of 80,000 Buddha Images Temple of Victory
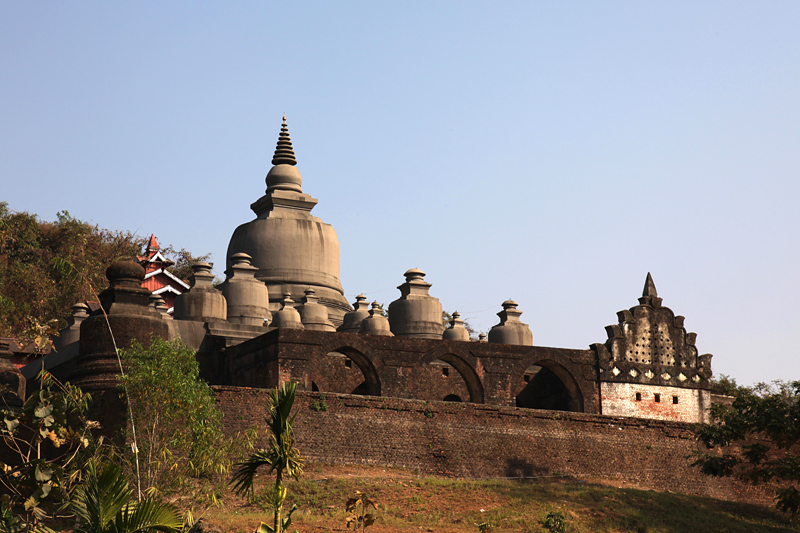
- Shitthaung Temple

- Location within Burma

Religion
- Affiliation: Theravada Buddhism

Location
- Country: Myanmar
- Coordinates: 20°35′51″N 93°11′35″E

Architecture
- Founder: King Min Bin
- Completed: 1535; 491 years ago

The Shaitthaung Temple (Rakhine and Burmese: ရှစ်သောင်းဘုရား, MLCTS: hrac saung bhu. ra:, Rakhine pronunciation: [ʃaɪʔθáʊɰ̃ pʰəɹá]), also spelled Shitthaung (Okell: Hyiʔthaùñ hpăyà [ʃɪʔθáʊɴ pʰəjá]) according to Standard Burmese pronunciation, is a Buddhist temple in Mrauk U. The name means 'Temple of 80,000 Buddha Images', and is also known as the 'Temple of Victory'.

== History ==
The temple was built in 1535–1536 by King Min Bin to commemorate his conquest of Bengal. It is located on the western face of Pokhaung Hill, north of the Royal Palace, and adjacent to the Andaw-thein Temple. It is typical of the many Buddhist temples found in Burma: a central bell-shaped stupa, surrounded by four smaller stupas at the corners, and a multitude of even-smaller stupas surrounding them. At the east of the temple, there is an addition of a flight of stairs and tazaung (about 75 years old).

There is a central hall at the heart of the temple, which can be easily accessed. Hundreds of Buddha statues line the main hall, some of them in their original positions, others moved from nearby excavation sites. However, the Shitthaung's most prominent feature is not the central hall, but rather the three layers of maze-like corridors that encircle the main hall. The three corridors contain multiple reliefs of Buddhas, Bodhisattvas, Kings of Spiritual abodes, Devas, guardian spirits, the 550 Jatakas, Arakanese culture and animals, both real and mythical.

The Shite-thaung temple is the main attraction of Mrauk U. Adjacent to it lies another famous temple, the Htukkanthein Temple (Htukkan Ordination Hall).

== Weather damage ==
Due to Mrauk U's tropical location, many of its temples have been damaged by the monsoon rain. It was discovered in 2003 that the central stupa had begun to leak, dissolving away some of the intricate statues in the two chambers. To prevent this, the local archaeological department poured concrete over the stupas. This prevented the statues inside from being destroyed, but it also destroyed the outer appearance of the temple, which was the focal pagoda to most of the northern Arakanese.

Multiple Arakanese criticize "the defacing" of their treasured temple, but since it was the only way to protect the more precious carvings inside, the actions have not been as widely condemned as expected.

== Gallery ==
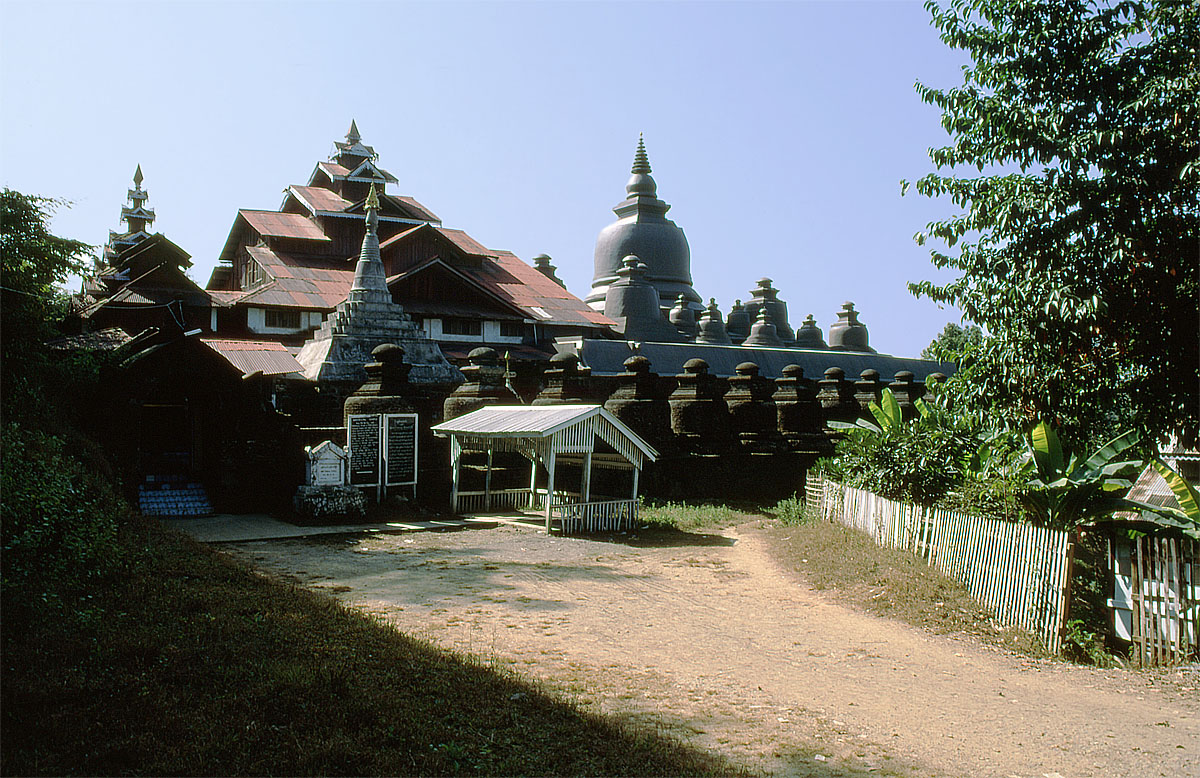
Outside view

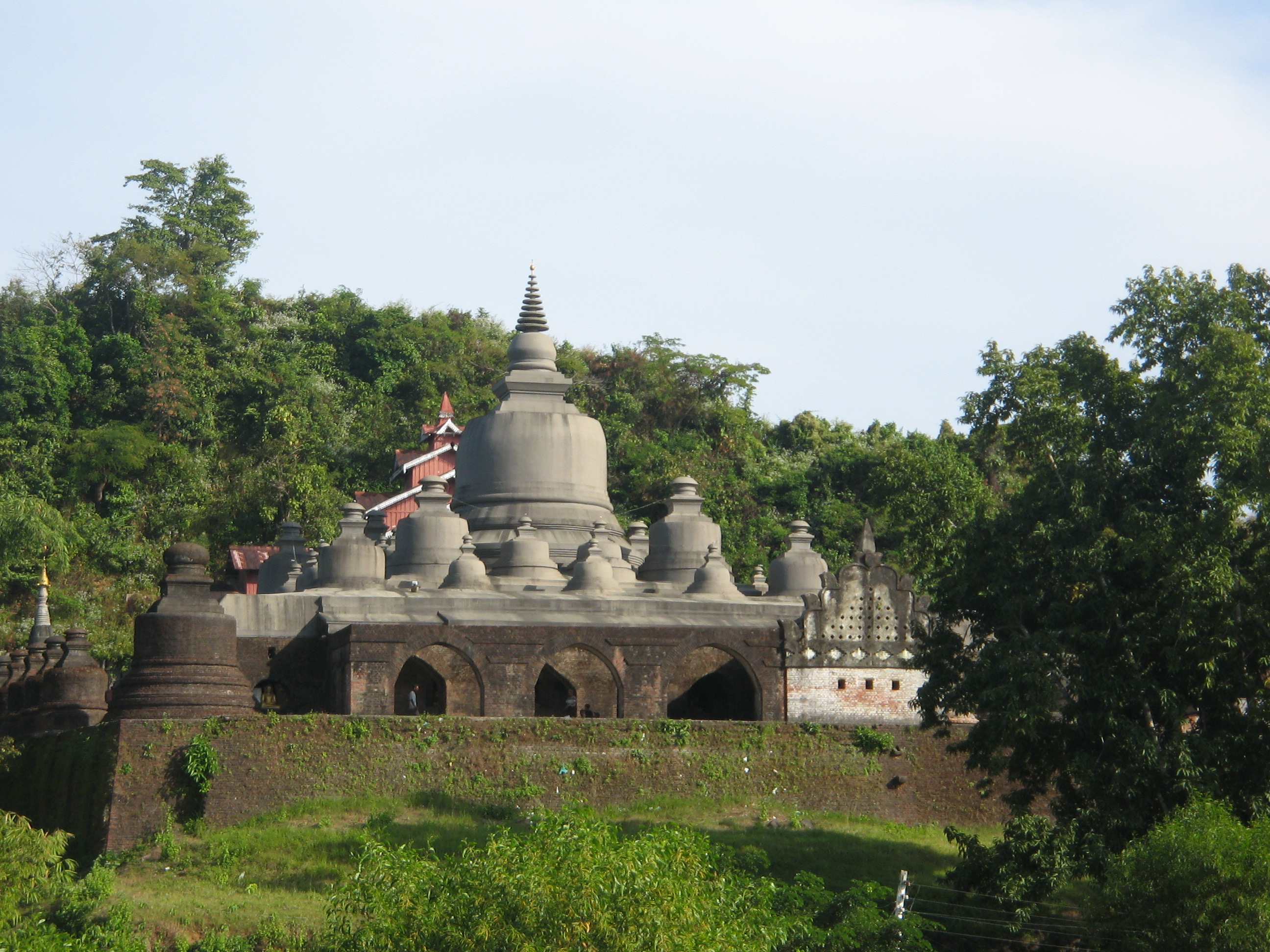
Outside view

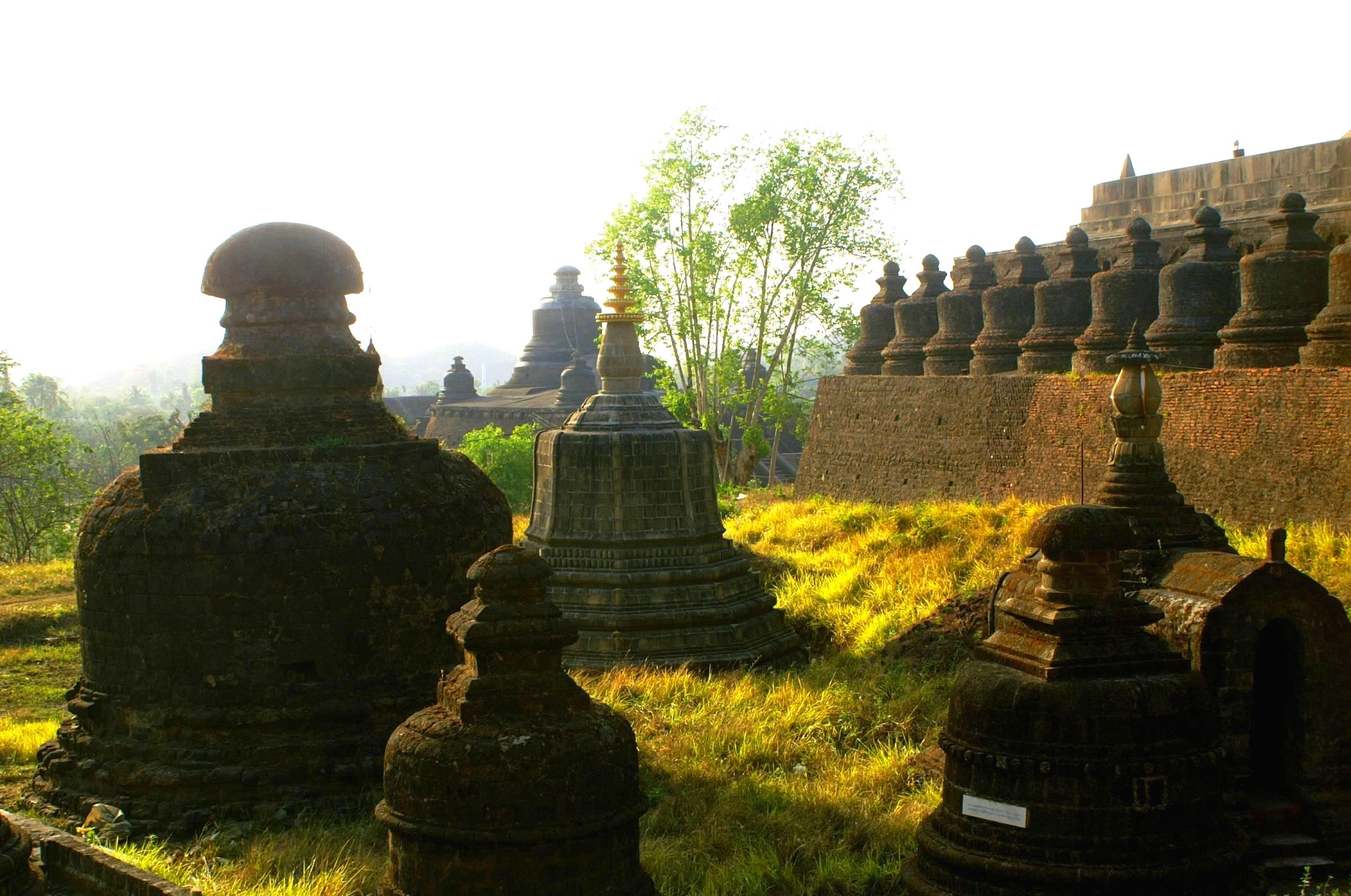
Closeup view of the temple at sunset

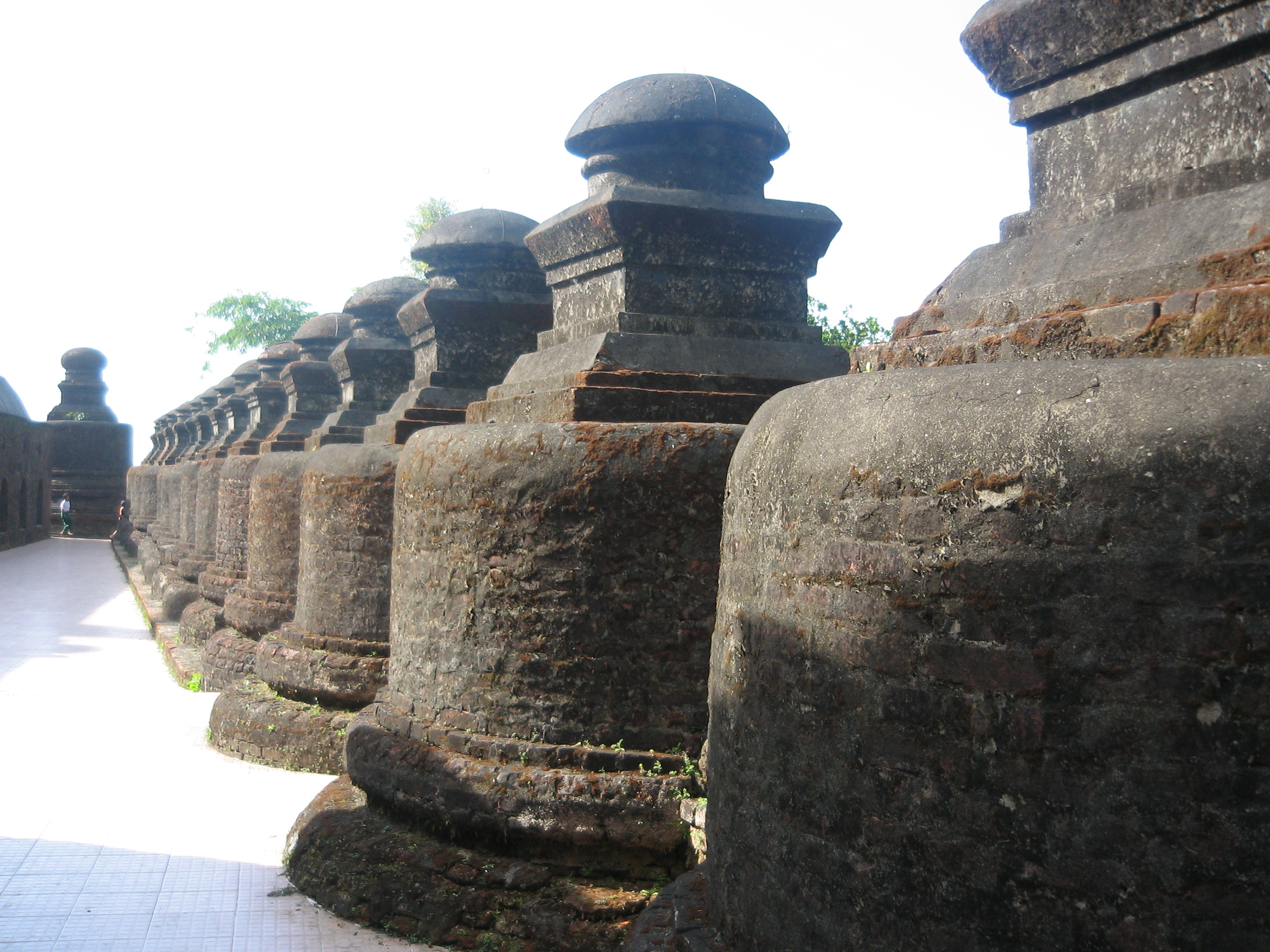
Row of stupas on the outside

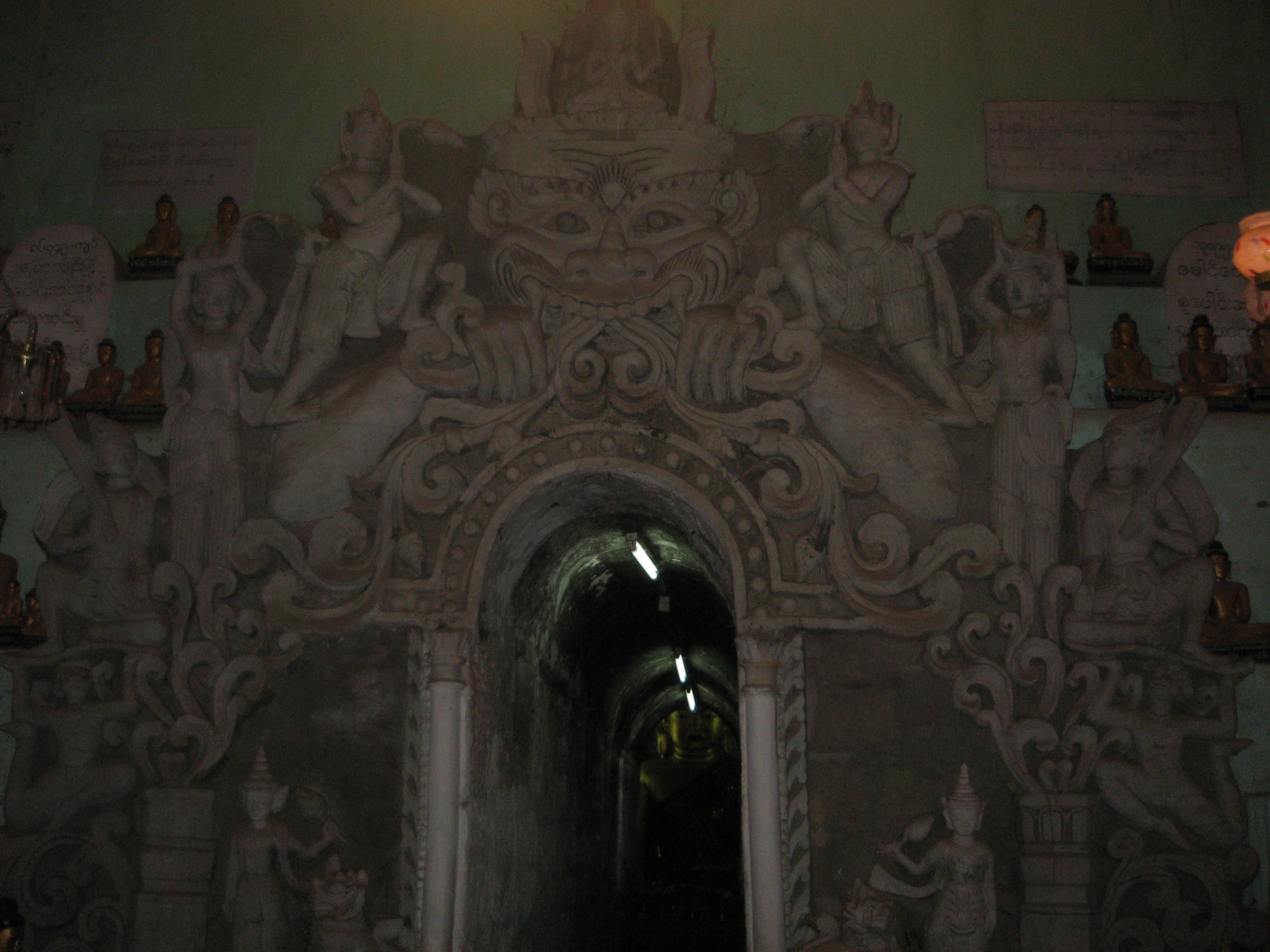
Entrance to the First Chamber

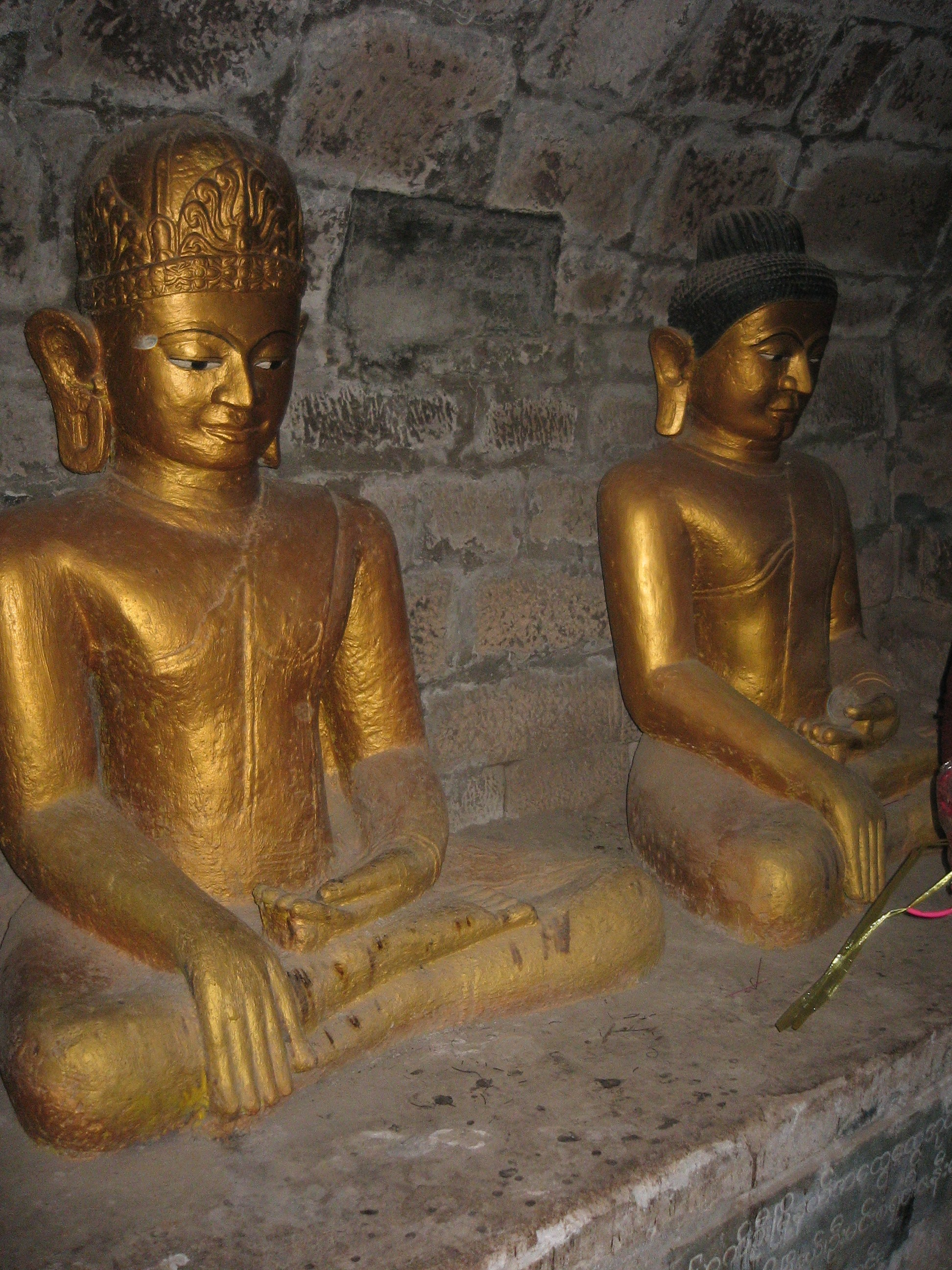
Buddha Statue at the End of the Second Chamber

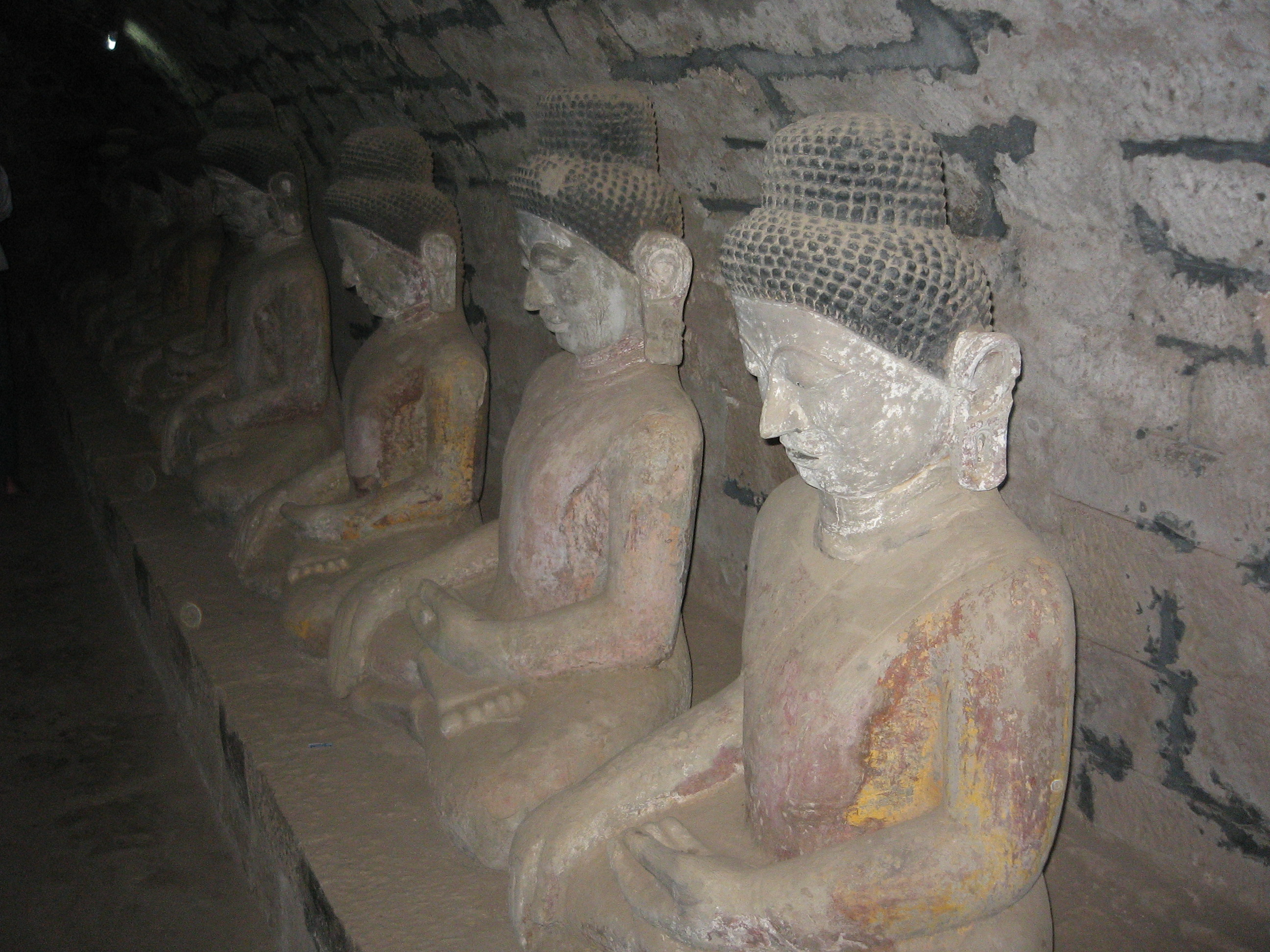
Buddha Statues in the Second Chamber

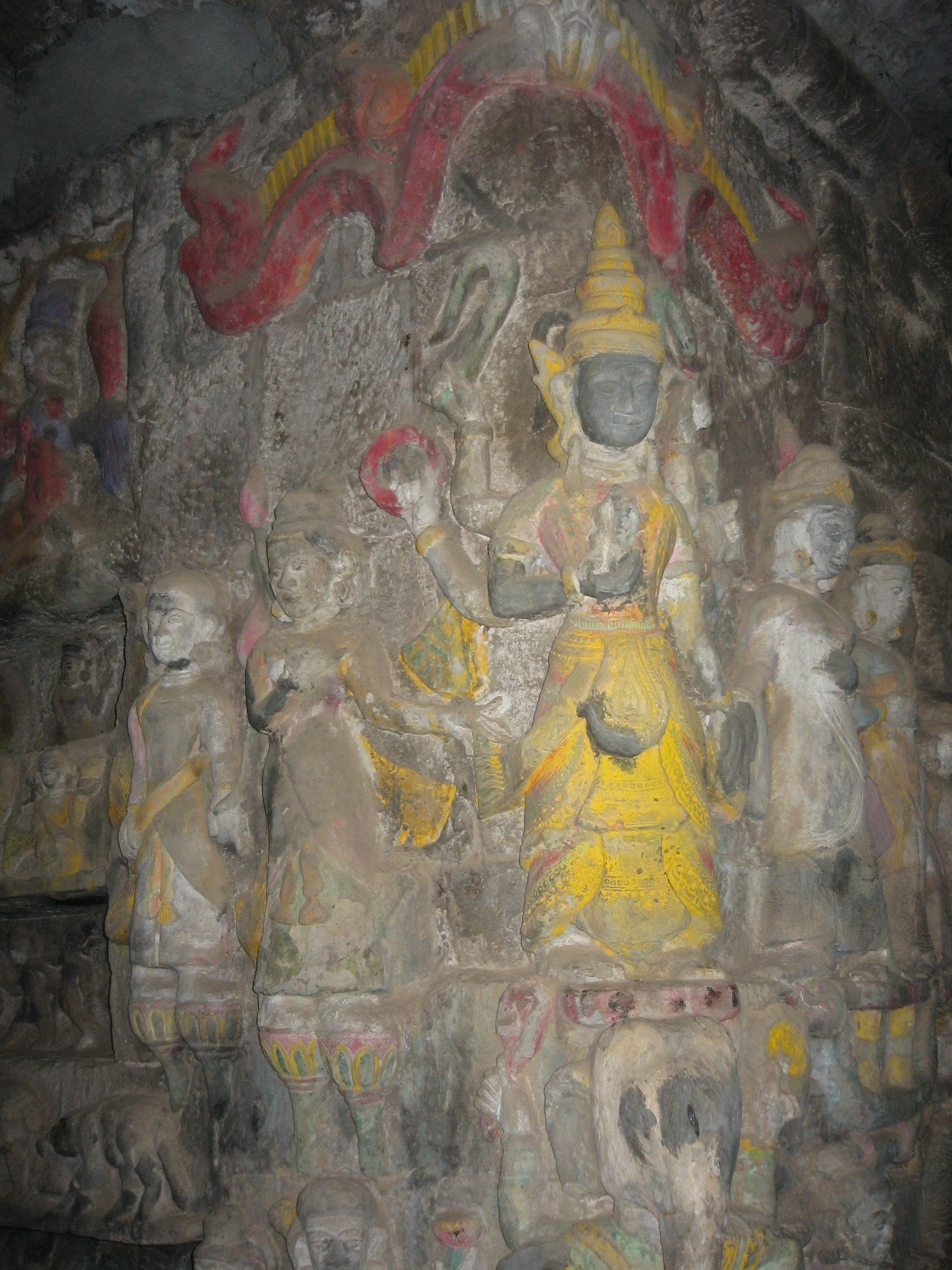
Statues of King Min Bin and his queens

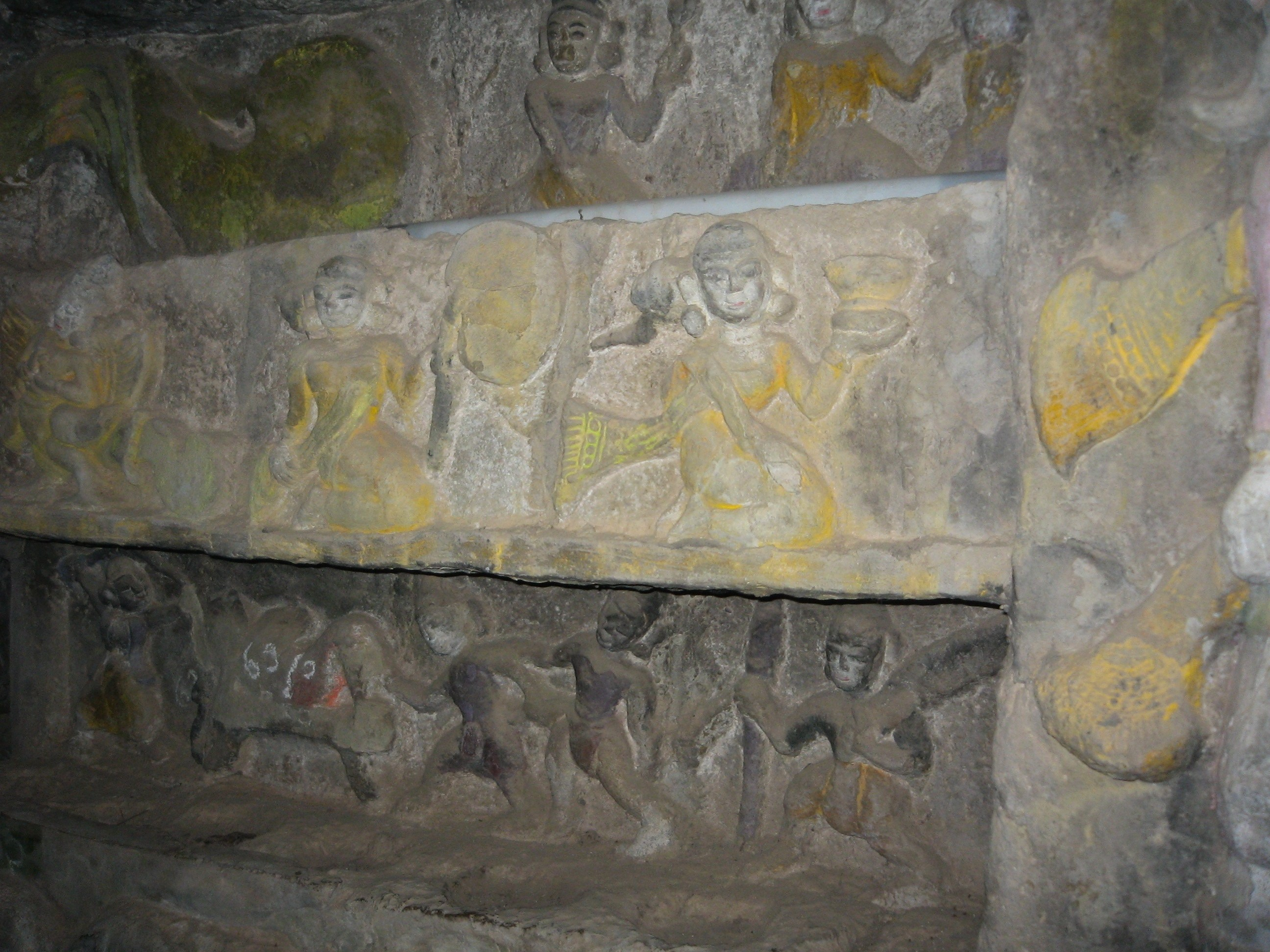
Carvings inside the third chamber

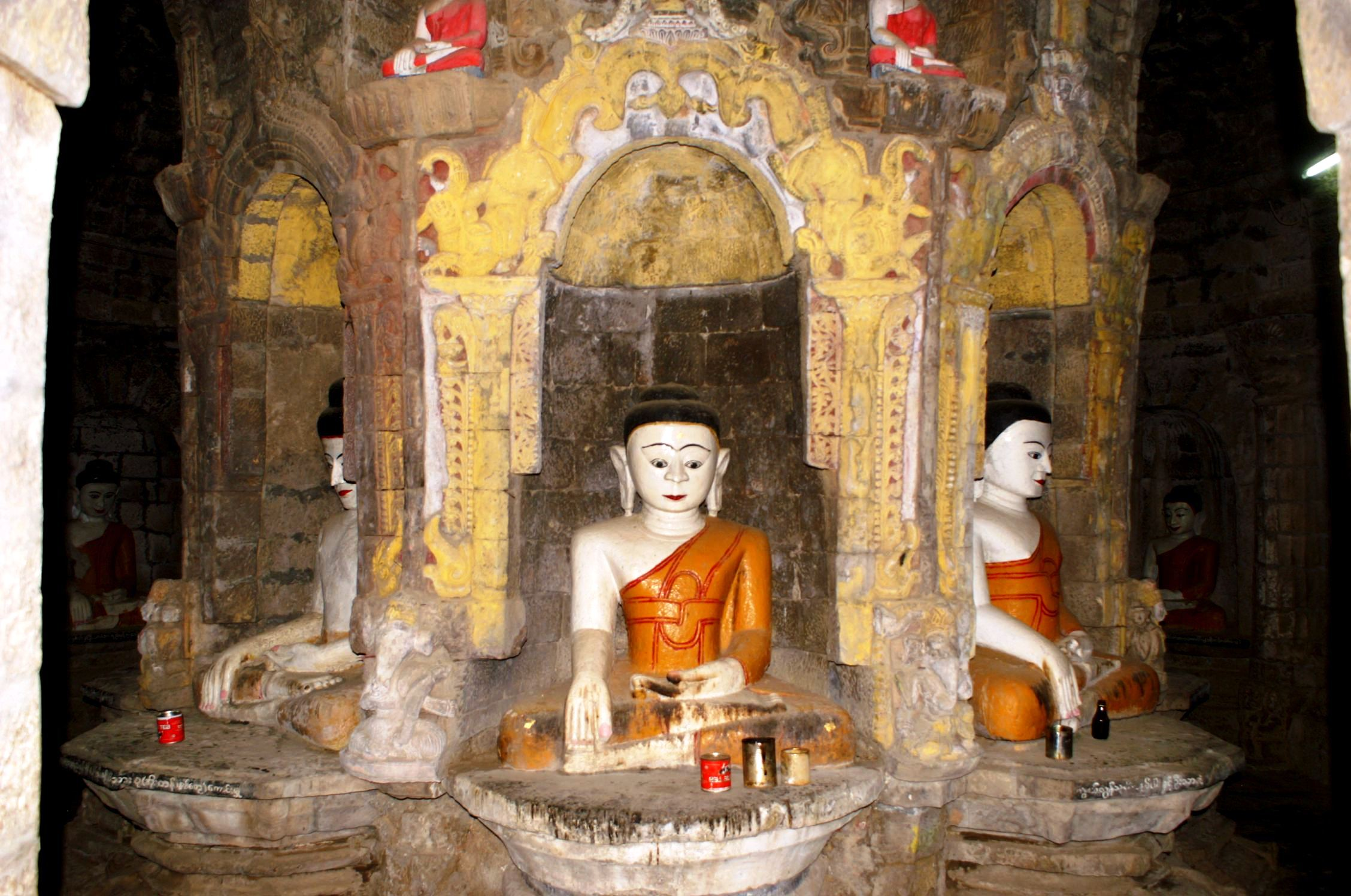
Inside the chamber

Layout of the temple

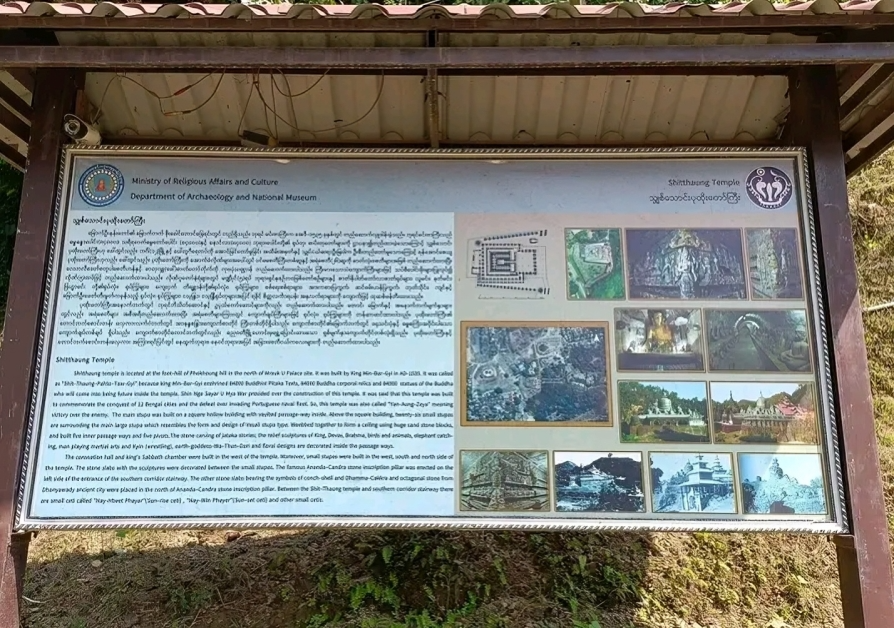
Introduction board of the temple

== See also ==
- Htukkanthein Temple
- Koe-thaung Temple
- Andaw-thein Ordination Hall
- Le-myet-hna Temple
- Ratanabon Pagoda

== Bibliography ==
- Gutman, Pamela (2001). Burma's Lost Kingdoms: Splendours of Arakan. Bangkok: Orchid Press. ISBN 974-8304-98-1.
