= Min Raza of Mrauk-U =

Raza I of Mrauk-U မင်းရာဇာ

King of Arakan
- Reign: February 1502 – c. November 1513
- Predecessor: Salingathu
- Successor: Gazapati
- Born: November 1480 (Monday born); Mrauk-U
- Died: c. January 1514 (aged 33); Mrauk-U
- Consort: Saw Thuba; Shin Phwa; Shin Pyo; Saw Nandi; Saw Manaw
- Issue: Gazapati; Shin Hla Htut; Min Bin; Min Aung Hla
Names
- Raza I (မင်းရာဇာ); Ilias Shah (ဣလိသျှာ)
- House: Saw Mon
- Father: Salingathu
- Religion: Theravada Buddhism

Min Raza (Burmese: မင်းရာဇာ, Burmese pronunciation: [mɪ́ɴ jàzà]; Arakanese pronunciation: [máɴ ɹàzà]; 1480–1514) was king of Arakan from 1502 to 1513. He was the father of King Min Bin (r. 1531–1554). His reign saw Arakanese first contact with the Portuguese. Portuguese explorer Duarte Barbosa gave details accounts of Arakanese court life at Mrauk-U and the king's herem.

Arakanese king meeting with Portuguese ambassador Silveira was a turning point in history between Arakanese and Portuguese bizarre relationship whom they would play major instrument in kingdom's rise to power and Arakanese dominance around Bay of Bengal. Raza's direct descendants who are successors proved to be capable rulers reaching the zenith period by middle half of 17th century.

== Reign ==
According to the Arakanese chronicles, he is said to be utterly uninterested in governing the country, except for his annual elephant hunting trips to the Thandwe region. He even stayed away from the capital Mrauk-U, moving to the old capital city of Wethali in 1510. (Note: (Sandamala Linkara Vol. 2 1931: 26) says he moved to Wethali on Saturday, 4th waning of Kason 876 ME. But 876 ME is a typo since he died in 875 ME. The date should be Saturday, 4th waning of Kason 872 ME (Saturday, 27 April 1510).) His lack of interest in governing led to his eventual fall from power and death. In late 1513, Raza was forced to abdicate after failing to quell a serious rebellion by the Thet people, who occupied Wethali for 29 days. The ministers chose his 15-year-old son by a concubine, Gazapati, who had put down the rebellion, to take over the throne. Though he was treated well at first, the fallen king was later executed by his son after hearing the rumors that his father's chief queen Saw Thuba was plotting.

The Portuguese first contact with Arakanese began during his reign when João da Silveira arrived in Mrauk-U in 1508 for trade commission and concession of a port facility around open water of Chittagong.

== Bibliography ==
- Sandamala Linkara, Ashin (1931). Rakhine Yazawinthit Kyan (in Burmese). Vol. 1–2 (1997–1999 ed.). Yangon: Tetlan Sarpay.
- Charney, Michael W. (1993). Arakan, Min Razagyi, and Portuguese:the relationship between the growth of Arakanese imperial power and Portuguese mercenaries on the fringe of Southeast Asia. London: SOAS Bulletin of Burma Research. ISSN 1479-8484.

Min Raza of Mrauk-U Mrauk-U Kingdom Born: 1480 Died: c. January 1514
Regnal titles
| Preceded by Salingathu | King of Mrauk-U; February 1502 – c. November 1513 | Succeeded by Gazapati |
