= Zein Pun =

Zein Pun ဇိတ်ပွန်
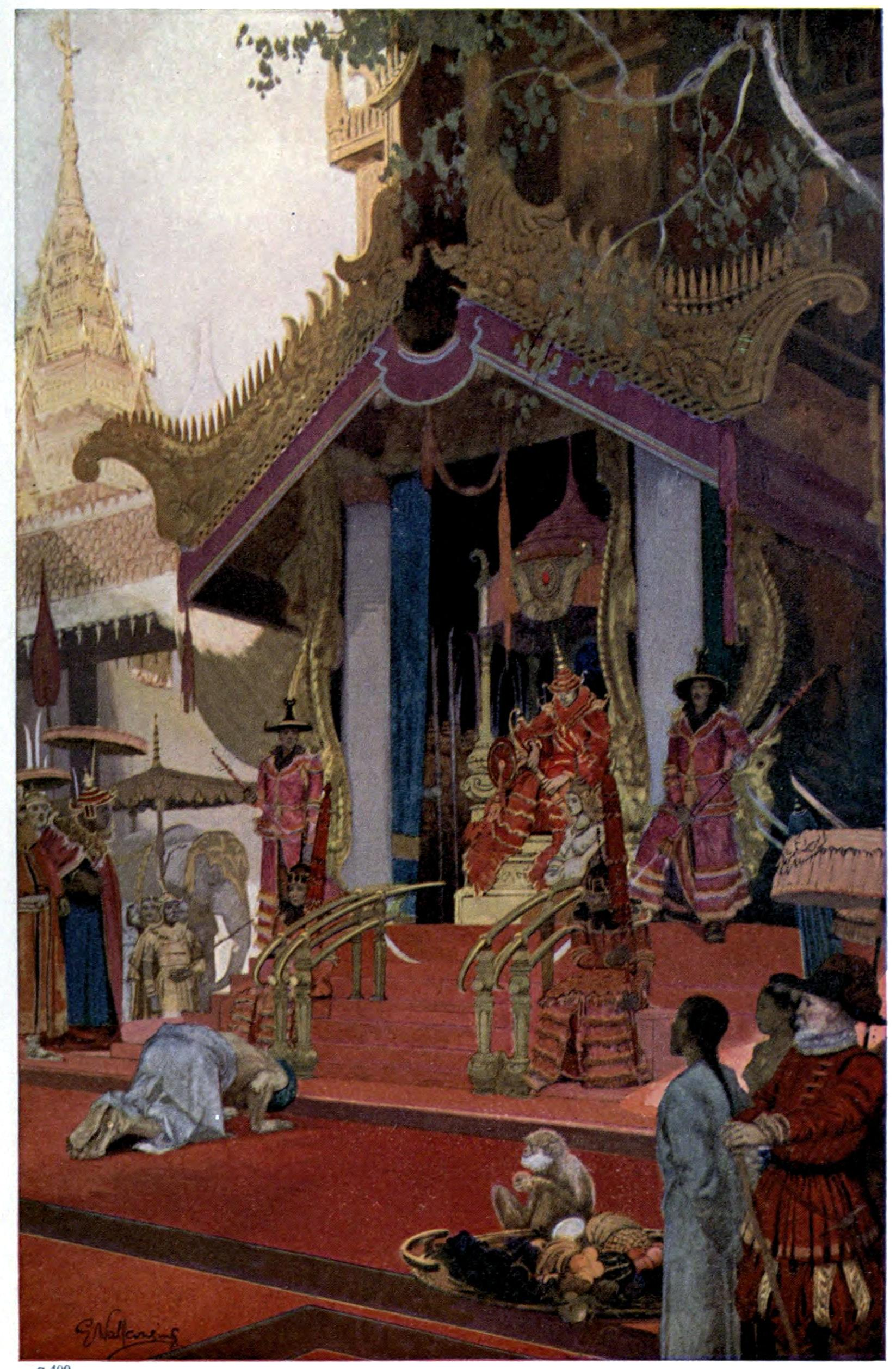

King of Martaban
- Reign: c. April 1330 (7 days)
- Predecessor: Saw Zein
- Successor: Saw E
- Born: 26 May 1295; Thursday, 12th waxing of Nayon 657 ME; Atawgana; Martaban Kingdom
- Died: c. April 1330 (aged 34) c. Kason 692 ME; Martaban (Mottama); Martaban Kingdom
- Religion: Theravada Buddhism

Zein Pun (Burmese: ဇိတ်ပွန် Burmese pronunciation: [zeɪʔ pʊ̀ɰ̃]; 1295–1330) was king of Martaban for one week in 1330. Of commoner background, Zein Pun rose from a childhood servant of Prince Saw Zein to a powerful commander during Saw Zein's reign. The ambitious commander then staged a coup against his lord, killing the king. But the usurper himself was killed a week later in a counter-coup organized by Queen Sanda Min Hla.

== Brief ==
Zein Pun was born on 26 May 1295 to commoner parents. (Note: (Pan Hla 2005: 41): Thursday, 12th waxing of Nayon 657 ME = Friday, 27 May 1295. Since he was a Thursday born, he was likely born on 26 May 1295.) As a young boy, he left his native village of Atawgana (အတောဂန), and came to work as a servant in the household of Gov. Min Bala of Myaungmya and Princess Hnin U Yaing. He was part of the staff that took care of Prince Saw Zein since childhood.

Zein Pun's career rose with Saw Zein who became king in 1323. The new king, who faced several rebellions from the outset, came to rely on a small circle of trusted men. In the following years, the king went on to put down revolts in the Mon-speaking regions of Lower Burma although he could not retake the Tenasserim coast. Zein Pun apparently had proven himself. The king entrusted him to command a special military battalion made up of 500 ethnic Shan warriors.

By 1330, Zein Pun had become a powerful figure. He had built himself a large estate, surrounded by a garden and a moat, and defended by his Shan battalion. The commoner had begun eyeing the throne for himself especially after Saw Zein's recent battlefield setbacks at Prome (Pyay) in the north and at Tavoy in the south. In April/May 1330, he invited the king to his estate, which apparently was outside the capital, to his housewarming ceremony. When the unsuspecting king entered the house, his men ambushed and killed him.

He then completed by proclaiming himself king with the title of Deibban Min. The royal family of Martaban was in shock but soon reacted. The fallen king's chief queen Sanda Min Hla managed to escape the coup, and organized a counter coup of the usurper seven days later. That day, Sanda Min Hla and her retinue led by Gen. Sit Thingyan went to the palace, ostensibly to submit to the new king. Inside the palace, Sit Thingyan's men managed to overcome Zein Pun's troops. Zein Pun was put to death immediately. He was 34.

Sanda Min Hla then put her nephew Saw E on the throne, and made herself the chief queen of the nephew.

== Bibliography ==
- Pan Hla, Nai (2005) [1968]. Razadarit Ayedawbon (in Burmese) (8th printing ed.). Yangon: Armanthit Sarpay.
- Phayre, Lt. Gen. Sir Arthur P. (1967) [1883]. History of Burma. London: Susil Gupta.

Zein Pun Born: 26 May 1295 Died: c. April 1330
Regnal titles
Preceded by Saw Zein	King of Martaban c. April 1330 (7 days)	Succeeded by Saw E
