= Minkhaung of Mrauk-U =

Minkhaung မင်းခေါင်

King of Arakan
- Reign: c. April 1521 – 27 May 1531
- Predecessor: Thazata
- Successor: Min Bin
- Born: c. March 1477 (Thursday born); Mrauk-U
- Died: 27 May 1531 (aged 54); Saturday, 11th waxing of Nayon 893 ME (Note: The chronicle Rakhine Razawin Thit (Sandamala Linkara Vol. 2 1999: 29) says Min Bin came to power on Saturday, 1st waxing of Nayon 893 ME, which translates to Wednesday, 17 May 1531. The correct date should be Saturday, 11th waxing of Nayon 893 ME, which translates to Saturday, 27 May 1531.); Daingkyi
- Consort: Saw Nan-Hset
- Father: Dawlya
- Mother: Saw Ru Saw
- Religion: Theravada Buddhism

Minkhaung of Mrauk-U (Burmese: မင်းခေါင်, Burmese pronunciation: [mɪ́ɴɡàʊɴ], Arakanese pronunciation: [máɴ ɡàʊɴ]; 1477–1531) was king of Arakan from 1521 to 1531. He was a son of King Dawlya (r. 1482–1492), and succeeded his elder brother King Thazata. He ascended the throne and married his brother's chief queen, Saw Nan-Hset. He was overthrown and killed by Min Bin, then governor of Sandoway (Thandwe) in 1531.

== Bibliography ==
- Sandamala Linkara, Ashin (1931). Rakhine Yazawinthit Kyan (in Burmese). Vol. 1–2 (1997–1999 ed.). Yangon: Tetlan Sarpay.

Minkhaung of Mrauk-U Mrauk-U Kingdom Born: c. March 1477 Died: 27 May 1531
Regnal titles
Preceded by Thazata	King of Mrauk-U c. April 1521 – 27 May 1531	Succeeded by Pa-Gyi
