= Salingathu =

Salingathu စလင်္ကာသူ

King of Arakan
- Reign: c. July 1494 – February 1502
- Predecessor: Ran Aung
- Successor: Raza
- Born: c. April 1455 (Wednesday born); Mrauk-U
- Died: February 1502 (aged 46); Tabaung 863 ME; Mrauk-U
- Consort: Saw Mi Saw
- Issue: Raza
Names
- Salingathu (စလင်္ကာသူ); Abdullah Shah
- House: Saw Mon
- Father: unknown
- Religion: Theravada Buddhism

Salingathu (Burmese: စလင်္ကာသူ [səlìɴɡəθù], 1455–1502), was King of Arakan from 1494 to 1502.

== Reign ==
Salingathu came to power by overthrowing his eight-year-old nephew, Ran Aung. He was extremely cautious about his personal security. He strictly regulated the schedule by which the gates of the palace and the city could be kept open. He employed many Household Guards in the Palace and around the capital, and always traveled with an extensive security detail. His chief Queen was Saw Mi Saw, daughter of King Ba Saw Phyu.

== Death ==
Salingathu died of natural causes in 1502 at age 46. He was succeeded by his son Raza.

== Bibliography ==
- Sandamala Linkara, Ashin (1931). Rakhine Yazawinthit Kyan (in Burmese). Vol. 1–2 (1997–1999 ed.). Yangon: Tetlan Sarpay.

Salingathu Mrauk-U Kingdom Born: c. April 1455 Died: February 1502
Regnal titles
Preceded by Ran Aung	King of Mrauk-U c. July 1494 – February 1502	Succeeded by Raza
