= Gazapati =

Gazapati ဂဇာပတိ

King of Arakan
- Reign: c. November 1513 – January 1515
- Predecessor: Raza
- Successor: Saw O
- Born: c. December 1497; Mrauk-U
- Died: January 1515 (aged 17); Mrauk-U
- Consort: Saw Thuza
Names
- Gazapati (ဂဇာပတိ); Ilias Shah II (ဣလီယပ်သျှား)
- House: Saw Mon
- Father: Raza
- Mother: Saw Manaw
- Religion: Theravada Buddhism

Gazapati (Burmese: ဂဇာပတိ, pronounced [ɡəzàpətḭ]; c. 1497–1515) was king of Arakan, a former state in Myanmar (Burma), from 1513 to 1515. He additionally took on the traditional title of Ilias Shah II.

== Early life ==
Gazapati was the eldest son of King Raza by a concubine.

== Reign ==
Gazapati was placed on the throne by the ministers after he had successfully put down a rebellion, which his father had been unable to take on. However, the young king quickly proved to be a tyrant. He had his father killed soon after his accession, and mistreated everyone at the court. With his confidants running amok, the kingdom is said to have suffered a great economic crisis due to their mismanagement.

== Foreign relations ==
=== Relations with Bengal Sultanate ===
During Gazapati's reign, he received diplomats and qadis from the Bengal Sultanate, who built mosques as a gift to Gazapati in the Baungduk river port district of Mrauk U. This created discontent within the court who saw it as eroding the Buddhist state religion and allowing missionaries into the capital.

The young king was said to be a womanizer, sleeping with wives of generals whom he had sent to the front at the Bengal border.

== Death ==
The ministers had him beheaded in January 1515, and placed Saw O, a granduncle of his, on the throne.

== Bibliography ==
- Sandamala Linkara, Ashin (1931). Rakhine Yazawinthit Kyan (in Burmese). Vol. 1–2 (1997–1999 ed.). Yangon: Tetlan Sarpay.
- Aye Chan (2017). ရခိုင်သမိုင်းမိတ်ဆက် [Introduction to Rakhine History]. Yangon: Shwe Thazin Publishing House.

Gazapati Mrauk-U Kingdom Born: c. December 1497 Died: c. January 1515
Regnal titles
Preceded by Raza	King of Mrauk-U c. November 1513 – January 1515	Succeeded by Saw O
