= Rakhine Razawin Thit =

Myanmar (Burmese) historical document

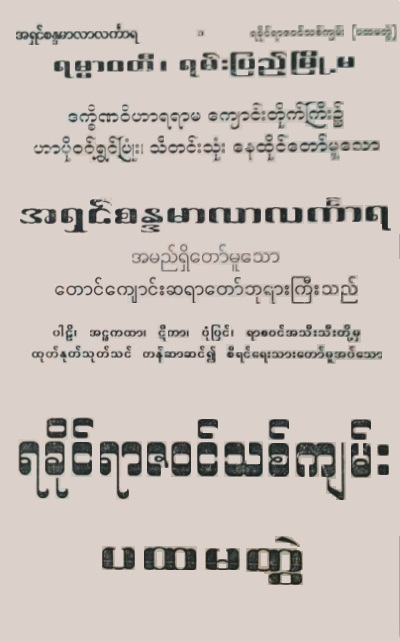
- Cover of the first volume of the 1997 reprint
- Author: Sandamala Linkāra (Candamālālaṅkāra)
- Original title: ရခိုင် ရာဇဝင်သစ်
- Language: Burmese
- Series: Arakanese chronicles
- Genre: Chronicle, History
- Publication date: 1931
- Media type: Print
- Pages: 7 volumes

Rakhine Razawin Thit (Burmese: ရခိုင် ရာဇဝင်သစ်, Burmese pronunciation: [ɹəkʰàiɴ jàzəwɪ̀ɴ ðɪʔ], Arakanese pronunciation: [ɹəkʰàiɴ ɹàzəwɔ̃ɴ ðɪʔ]) or the New Chronicle of Arakan, is a Burmese chronicle covering the history of Arakan from time immemorial to the First Anglo-Burmese War (1824–1826). The author was Ven. Sandamala Linkara (Pali: Candamālālaṅkāra), the Sayadaw (Chief Abbot) of Dakkhina Vihara Rama Buddhist Monastery in Ranbye Kyun in then British Burma. Published in 1931, it is a compilation of all extant prior Arakanese chronicles in a single narrative. The original 1931 publication consisted of seven volumes. The first four volumes were published in a single enlarged volume in 1997 and the remaining three were published in another enlarged volume in 1999.

== Bibliography ==
- Sandamala Linkara, Ashin (1931). Rakhine Yazawinthit Kyan (in Burmese). Vol. 1–7 (1997–1999 ed.). Yangon: Tetlan Sarpay.
