= List of Burmese royal consorts =

This is a list of the queen consorts of the major kingdoms that existed in present-day Myanmar. Those with the rank of Nan Mibaya (senior queens) are listed.

== Primer ==
=== Rankings of consorts ===
Prior to the Konbaung period (1752–1885), the consorts of the Burmese monarchs were organized in three general tiers: Nan Mibaya (နန်းမိဖုရား, lit. "Queen of the Palace", senior queen), Mibaya (Nge) (မိဖုရား (ငယ်), "(Junior) Queen"), and Ko-lone-taw (ကိုယ်လုပ်တော်, concubine). (Note: (Than Tun 1964: 129): The Pagan period (849–1297) term for Nan Mibaya was Pyinthe (ပြင်သည်), and the term Usaukpan (ဦးဆောက်ပန်း) also meant the chief queen. (Harvey 1925: 327): Usaukpan was an Old Burmese direct translation of Pali Vatamsaka, an artificial flower of silver or gold used as a hair ornament.) Starting in the late 18th century, the Konbaung kings inserted the tiers of Hsaungdaw Mibaya (ဆောင်တော် မိဖုရား, lit. "Queen of the Royal Apartment") and Shwe-Yay Hsaung Mibaya (ရွှေရေးဆောင် မိဖုရား, lit. "Queen of the Gilded Chamber") between the tiers of senior queen and junior queen.

Ladies in waiting such as Apyo-daw (အပျိုတော်, "maiden") and Maung-ma (မောင်းမ, "handmaid") were part of the general staff of the palace.

==== Senior queens ====
Each tier had further rankings within it. The order of precedence within the topmost tier was:

Rank	Title	Description
1.	Nanmadaw Mibaya Khaunggyi (နန်းမတော် မိဖုရား ခေါင်ကြီး) or Taung Nan Mibaya (တောင်နန်း မိဖုရား)	Chief Queen or Queen of the Southern Palace
2.	Myauk Nan Mibaya (မြောက်နန်း မိဖုရား)	Queen of the Northern Palace
3.	Ale Nan Mibaya (အလယ်နန်း မိဖုရား)	Queen of the Central Palace
4.	Anauk Nan Mibaya (အနောက်နန်း မိဖုရား)	Queen of the Western Palace

Aside from a few rare exceptions, the Queen of the Southern Palace was the official chief queen consort. (Note: In Burma Proper, it was extremely rare for a queen of the Southern Palace to not also be the chief queen. According to the rankings reported in the chronicles, Sithu II (Hmannan Vol. 1 2003: 287) and Nanda (Hmannan Vol. 3 2003: 107) had South Queens who were not their chief queen. In the Mrauk-U Kingdom on the west coast, three kings—Min Khamaung (RRT Vol. 2 1999: 87, 89), Thado (RRT Vol. 2 1999: 115), Sanda Thaditha (RRT Vol. 2 1999: 147, 149)—had South Queens who were not their chief queen.) In theory, the chief queen consort alone had the right to a white umbrella and to sit with the King on the royal throne.

==== Junior queens ====
Queens of the Second Rank
Rank	Title	Description
1	Taung Hsaungdaw Mibaya (တောင်ဆောင်တော်မိဖုရား)	Queen of the Southern Royal Apartment
2	Myauk Hsaungdaw Mibaya (မြောက်ဆောင်တော်မိဖုရား)	Queen of the Northern Royal Apartment

Queens of the Third Rank
Rank	Title	Description
1	Taung Shwe-Yay Mibaya (တောင်ရွှေရေးမိဖုရား)	Queen of the Southern Gilded Chamber
2	Myauk Shwe-Yay Mibaya (မြောက်ရွှေရေးမိဖုရား)	Queen of the Northern Gilded Chamber
3	Ale Shwe-Yay Mibaya (အလယ်ရွှေရေးမိဖုရား)	Queen of the Central Gilded Chamber
4	Anauk Shwe-Yay Mibaya (အနောက်ရွှေရေးမိဖုရား)	Queen Of the Western Gilded Chamber

Queens of the Fourth Rank
Rank	Title	Description
1	Myo-za Mibaya (မြို့စား မိဖုရား)	Queen with township-level appanage
2	Ywa-za Mibaya (ရွာစား မိဖုရား)	Queen with village-level appanage

==== Concubines ====
Concubines were called Ko-lok-taw (ကိုယ်လုပ်တော်, lit. "one who administers to the royal body") or Chay-daw-din (ခြေတော်တင်, lit. "one on whom the royal feet are placed").

Concubines
Rank	Title	Description
1	Ko-lone-taw Gyi (ကိုယ်လုပ်တော်ကြီး)	Senior Concubine
2	Ko-lone-taw (ကိုယ်လုပ်တော်)	Concubine
3	Chay-daw-din (ခြေတော်တင်)	Concubine

=== Names ===
The names of the queens, if known, are given according to their most well known common name, which often happens to be the primary name used by the royal chronicles. The chronicle reported names of the queens may be their popular/commonly known name (e.g., Pwa Saw, Nanmadaw Me Nu); formal title (e.g., Agga Mahethi, Sanda Dewi); personal name (e.g., Shin Bo-Me, Yun San); or generic name of the office (Hanthawaddy Mibaya, "Queen of Hanthawaddy"; or Myauk Pyinthe, "Queen of the Northern Palace"). Finally, the names of the queens with no known records are given as "(Unknown)".

=== Duration of consortship ===
The "Became consort" and "Ceased to be consort" dates indicate the period when a given queen acted as the royal consort—not the duration of marriage.

== Pagan dynasty ==
=== Early Pagan ===
Consort	Rank	Became consort	Ceased to be consort	Spouse	Notes
Taung Pyinthe	Chief	?	1001	Saw Rahan II	
Myauk Pyinthe	North	?	1001	Saw Rahan II	
Ale Pyinthe	Center	?	1001	Saw Rahan II	
Taung Pyinthe	Chief	1001	c. 1014	Kunhsaw Kyaunghpyu	
Myauk Pyinthe	North	1001	c. 1014	Kunhsaw Kyaunghpyu	
Myauk Pyinthe	c. 1014	1021		Kunhsaw Kyaunghpyu	
Ale Pyinthe	Center	1001	?	Kunhsaw Kyaunghpyu	
(Unknown)	Chief	1021	c. 1 April 1038	Kyiso	
(Unknown)	Chief	c. 1 April 1038	11 August 1044	Sokkate	
Myauk Pyinthe	North?	August 1044	11 August 1044	Sokkate	

=== Pagan Empire ===
Consort	Rank	Became consort	Ceased to be consort	Spouse	Notes
Agga Mahethi	Chief	c. 1048	c. 1077	Anawrahta	(Note: Chronicles (Hmannan Vol. 1 2003: 267–268) mention Agga Mahethi and Manisanda as Anawrahta's two senior queens towards the end of his reign. Per (Hmannan Vol. 1 2003: 255–256), Queen Saw Mon Hla was sent back to her native land about six years before his death.)
Saw Mon Hla	North	c. 1058	c. 1071	Anawrahta	(Note: Chronicles (Hmannan Vol. 1 2003: 267–268) mention Agga Mahethi and Manisanda as Anawrahta's two senior queens towards the end of his reign. Per (Hmannan Vol. 1 2003: 255–256), Queen Saw Mon Hla was sent back to her native land about six years before his death.)
Manisanda	North	c. 1070s	11 April 1077	Anawrahta	(Note: Chronicles (Hmannan Vol. 1 2003: 267–268) mention Agga Mahethi and Manisanda as Anawrahta's two senior queens towards the end of his reign. Per (Hmannan Vol. 1 2003: 255–256), Queen Saw Mon Hla was sent back to her native land about six years before his death.)
Usaukpan	Chief	11 April 1077	c. 1084	Saw Lu	
Manisanda	North	11 April 1077	c. 1084	Saw Lu	
Manisanda	North	c. 1077/78	c. April 1084	Saw Lu	
Apeyadana	Chief	21 April 1084	12th century	Kyansittha	(Note: See (Hmannan Vol. 1 2003: 279) for Kyansittha's four senior queens. (Hmannan Vol. 1 2003: 283) says Thanbula showed up with Kyansittha's son at the palace after the king had anointed Sithu I as heir apparent, and that the king raised her to queen with the title of Usaukpan, which meant the chief queen. Since Sithu I was born in 1090, she could have come in the 1090s at the earliest. Her getting the title probably meant the first chief queen Apeyadana had died. But Queen Apeyadana was still alive in 1102; it means Thanbula probably came to the palace in the 1100s.)
Manisanda	North	21 April 1084	c. 1112/1113	Kyansittha	
Khin Tan	Center	21 April 1084	c. 1112/1113	Kyansittha	
Thanbula	Chief	c. 12th century	c. 1112/1113	Kyansittha	
Yadanabon I	Chief	1112/13	c. 1050s	Sithu I	(Note: (Hmannan Vol. 1 2003: 287): All four of Sithu's senior queens (not just the chief queen) participated in his coronation ceremony. The South Queen, Taung Pyinthe, technically should have been the chief queen but the royal chronicles list her fourth in line behind Yadanabon, Ti Lawka Sanda Dewi and Yazakumari. Later, Sanda Dewi succeeded Yadanabon as chief queen. (Hmannan Vol. 2 2003: 287, 302): Late in his regin, Sithu II raised two other queens: Khin U and Princess Pabhavati of Padeikkaya. Though the chronicles do not explicitly say they were senior queens, they probably graduated to the rank, especially toward the end of the reign. His remaining three senior queens probably might not have lived as long as the king who lived to 77.)
Ti Lawka Sanda Dewi	Center	1112/13	c. 1050s	Sithu I	
Ti Lawka Sanda Dewi	Chief	c. 1050s	1167	Sithu I	
Yazakumari	West	1112/13	?	Sithu I	
Taung Pyinthe (Sithu I)	South	1112/13	?	Sithu I	
Taung Pyinthe (Narathu)	Chief	1167	c. February 1171	Narathu	(Note: None of the main chronicles has a record of the names of the queens of Narathu. Yazawin Thit (Yazawin Thit Vol. 1 2012: 122) explicitly says no records of his queens could be found. Yazawin Thit and Hmannan (Hmannan Vol. 1 2003: 312) mention only that Naratheinkha and Sithu II had the same mother. Per scholarship, (Yazawin Thit Vol. 1 2012: 124, footnote 2, citing Than Tun), their mother was the North Queen. It means there was a South Queen.)
Myauk Pyinthe (Narathu)	North	1167	c. February 1171	Narathu	(Note: None of the main chronicles has a record of the names of the queens of Narathu. Yazawin Thit (Yazawin Thit Vol. 1 2012: 122) explicitly says no records of his queens could be found. Yazawin Thit and Hmannan (Hmannan Vol. 1 2003: 312) mention only that Naratheinkha and Sithu II had the same mother. Per scholarship, (Yazawin Thit Vol. 1 2012: 124, footnote 2, citing Than Tun), their mother was the North Queen. It means there was a South Queen.)
Min Aung Myat	Chief	c. February 1171	c. May 1174	Naratheinkha	(Note: See (Hmannan Vol. 1 2003: 312) and (Yazawin Thit Vol. 1 2012: 124) for the names of the Chief and North queens; and (Than Tun 1964: 129) for Saw Ahlwan (Saw Hteikhta in Modern Burmese per Than Tun).)
Saw Lat	North	c. February 1171	c. May 1174	Naratheinkha	(Note: See (Hmannan Vol. 1 2003: 312) and (Yazawin Thit Vol. 1 2012: 124) for the names of the Chief and North queens; and (Than Tun 1964: 129) for Saw Ahlwan (Saw Hteikhta in Modern Burmese per Than Tun).)
Saw Ahlwan	Center	c. February 1171	c. May 1174	Naratheinkha	(Note: See (Hmannan Vol. 1 2003: 312) and (Yazawin Thit Vol. 1 2012: 124) for the names of the Chief and North queens; and (Than Tun 1964: 129) for Saw Ahlwan (Saw Hteikhta in Modern Burmese per Than Tun).)
Weluwaddy	West	c. April 1174	c. May 1174	Naratheinkha	(Note: See (Hmannan Vol. 1 2003: 312) and (Yazawin Thit Vol. 1 2012: 124) for the names of the Chief and North queens; and (Than Tun 1964: 129) for Saw Ahlwan (Saw Hteikhta in Modern Burmese per Than Tun).)
Weluwaddy	Chief	c. May 1174	1186	Sithu II	(Note: Per (Hmannan Vol. 1 2003: 317), Sithu II took all his brother's senior queens as his at the start of his reign. Per inscriptional evidence (Than Tun 1964: 129), the king had at least six senior queens during his reign. Queen Weluwaddy died in 1186 per (Hmannan Vol. 1 2003: 321). Sithu II kept separate chief and South queens at least with Weluwaddy and Min Aung Myat.)
Min Aung Myat	South	c. May 1174	1185?	Sithu II	(Note: Per (Hmannan Vol. 1 2003: 317), Sithu II took all his brother's senior queens as his at the start of his reign. Per inscriptional evidence (Than Tun 1964: 129), the king had at least six senior queens during his reign. Queen Weluwaddy died in 1186 per (Hmannan Vol. 1 2003: 321). Sithu II kept separate chief and South queens at least with Weluwaddy and Min Aung Myat.)
Saw Lat	North	c. May 1174	1190s?	Sithu II	(Note: Per (Hmannan Vol. 1 2003: 317), Sithu II took all his brother's senior queens as his at the start of his reign. Per inscriptional evidence (Than Tun 1964: 129), the king had at least six senior queens during his reign. Queen Weluwaddy died in 1186 per (Hmannan Vol. 1 2003: 321). Sithu II kept separate chief and South queens at least with Weluwaddy and Min Aung Myat.)
Saw Ahlwan	Center	c. May 1174	1190s?	Sithu II	(Note: Per (Hmannan Vol. 1 2003: 317), Sithu II took all his brother's senior queens as his at the start of his reign. Per inscriptional evidence (Than Tun 1964: 129), the king had at least six senior queens during his reign. Queen Weluwaddy died in 1186 per (Hmannan Vol. 1 2003: 321). Sithu II kept separate chief and South queens at least with Weluwaddy and Min Aung Myat.)
Taung Pyinthe II (Sithu II)	Chief	c. 1190s	18 August 1211	Sithu II	(Note: Per (Hmannan Vol. 1 2003: 317), Sithu II took all his brother's senior queens as his at the start of his reign. Per inscriptional evidence (Than Tun 1964: 129), the king had at least six senior queens during his reign. Queen Weluwaddy died in 1186 per (Hmannan Vol. 1 2003: 321). Sithu II kept separate chief and South queens at least with Weluwaddy and Min Aung Myat.)
Myauk Pyinthe II (Sithu II)	North	c. 1190s	18 August 1211	Sithu II	(Note: Per (Hmannan Vol. 1 2003: 317), Sithu II took all his brother's senior queens as his at the start of his reign. Per inscriptional evidence (Than Tun 1964: 129), the king had at least six senior queens during his reign. Queen Weluwaddy died in 1186 per (Hmannan Vol. 1 2003: 321). Sithu II kept separate chief and South queens at least with Weluwaddy and Min Aung Myat.)
Wadanthika	Center	c. 1190s	c. 1190s	Sithu II	(Note: Per (Hmannan Vol. 1 2003: 317), Sithu II took all his brother's senior queens as his at the start of his reign. Per inscriptional evidence (Than Tun 1964: 129), the king had at least six senior queens during his reign. Queen Weluwaddy died in 1186 per (Hmannan Vol. 1 2003: 321). Sithu II kept separate chief and South queens at least with Weluwaddy and Min Aung Myat.)
Saw Mya Kan	Center	c. 1190s	18 August 1211	Sithu II	(Note: Per (Hmannan Vol. 1 2003: 317), Sithu II took all his brother's senior queens as his at the start of his reign. Per inscriptional evidence (Than Tun 1964: 129), the king had at least six senior queens during his reign. Queen Weluwaddy died in 1186 per (Hmannan Vol. 1 2003: 321). Sithu II kept separate chief and South queens at least with Weluwaddy and Min Aung Myat.)
Pwadawgyi	Chief	18 August 1211	c. 1231–35	Htilominlo	
Myauk Pyinthe (Htilominlo)	North	18 August 1211	c. 1231–35	Htilominlo	
Saw Mi Pyan	Center	18 August 1211	c. 1231–35	Htilominlo	
Shin Saw	Chief	c. 1231	c. 1235	Naratheinga Uzana	(Note: Chronicles do not mention Naratheinga Uzana as king at all. Per (Than Tun 1964: 131–132), contemporary inscriptions say that Uzana, who was crown prince, was now the ruler or at least the regent. Some historians such as Htin Aung (Htin Aung 1970: 43) and Michael Aung-Thwin (Aung-Thwin and Aung-Thwin 2012: 99) do not accept that Uzana was king.)
Saw Min Waing	North	c. 1231	c. 1235	Naratheinga Uzana	(Note: Chronicles do not mention Naratheinga Uzana as king at all. Per (Than Tun 1964: 131–132), contemporary inscriptions say that Uzana, who was crown prince, was now the ruler or at least the regent. Some historians such as Htin Aung (Htin Aung 1970: 43) and Michael Aung-Thwin (Aung-Thwin and Aung-Thwin 2012: 99) do not accept that Uzana was king.)
Yaza Dewi	Chief	19 July 1235	c. May 1251	Kyaswa	
Thonlula	Chief	c. May 1251	c. May 1256	Uzana	
Yadanabon II	Chief	6 May 1256	1262	Narathihapate	(Note: Chronicles (Hmannan Vol. 1 2003: 358) mention Pwa Saw as the only senior queen and the rest as junior queens. Per inscriptional evidence (Ba Shin 1982: 37), Pwa Saw's sister Yadanabon was the first chief queen of Narathihapate.)
Pwa Saw	North	6 May 1256	1262	Narathihapate	(Note: Chronicles (Hmannan Vol. 1 2003: 358) mention Pwa Saw as the only senior queen and the rest as junior queens. Per inscriptional evidence (Ba Shin 1982: 37), Pwa Saw's sister Yadanabon was the first chief queen of Narathihapate.)
Pwa Saw	Chief	1262	1 July 1287	Narathihapate	(Note: Chronicles (Hmannan Vol. 1 2003: 358) mention Pwa Saw as the only senior queen and the rest as junior queens. Per inscriptional evidence (Ba Shin 1982: 37), Pwa Saw's sister Yadanabon was the first chief queen of Narathihapate.)
Pwa Saw of Thitmahti	Chief	30 May 1289	17 December 1297	Kyawswa	(Note: Chronicles (Hmannan Vol. 1 2003: 360) mention only Saw Soe as the senior queen. But inscriptional evidence (Ba Shin 1982: 41–43) shows Saw Thitmahti was the chief queen, certainly by 1296.)
Saw Soe	North	30 May 1289	17 December 1297	Kyawswa	(Note: Chronicles (Hmannan Vol. 1 2003: 360) mention only Saw Soe as the senior queen. But inscriptional evidence (Ba Shin 1982: 41–43) shows Saw Thitmahti was the chief queen, certainly by 1296.)
Mi Saw U	Center	30 May 1289	17 December 1297	Kyawswa	(Note: Chronicles (Hmannan Vol. 1 2003: 360) mention only Saw Soe as the senior queen. But inscriptional evidence (Ba Shin 1982: 41–43) shows Saw Thitmahti was the chief queen, certainly by 1296.)

== Small kingdoms ==
=== Myinsaing ===
Consort	Rank	Became consort	Ceased to be consort	Spouse	Notes
Saw U	Chief	17 December 1297	13 April 1310	Athinkhaya	
(Unknown)	Chief	17 December 1297	c. 1312/13	Yazathingyan	
Mi Saw U	Chief	c. 17 December 1297	7 February 1313	Thihathu	
Yadanabon	North	c. 1300	7 February 1313	Thihathu	

=== Pinya ===
Consort	Rank	Became consort	Ceased to be consort	Spouse	Notes
Mi Saw U	Chief	7 February 1313	c. February 1325	Thihathu	
Yadanabon	North	7 February 1313	c. February 1325	Thihathu	
Atula Maha Dhamma Dewi	Chief	c. February 1325	1 September 1340	Uzana I	
Saw Htut	Chief	1 September 1340	29 March 1344	Sithu	
Atula Sanda Dewi	Chief	29 March 1344	12 December 1350	Kyawswa I	
Mway Medaw	North	29 March 1344	12 December 1350	Kyawswa I	
Saw Omma	Chief	12 December 1350	19 March 1359	Kyawswa II	
Saw Omma	Chief	19 March 1359	May 1364	Narathu	
Saw Omma	Chief	June 1364	September 1364	Uzana II	
Saw Sala	North	June 1364	September 1364	Uzana II	

=== Sagaing ===
Consort	Rank	Became consort	Ceased to be consort	Spouse	Notes
Saw Hnaung	Chief	15 May 1315	5 February 1327	Saw Yun	
Saw Hnaung	Chief	5 February 1327	1335/36	Tarabya I	
(Unknown)	Chief	1335/36	c. August 1339	Anawrahta I	
Saw Pa Oh	Chief	c. August 1339	c. March 1349	Kyaswa	
(Unknown)	Chief	c. March 1349	c. November 1349	Anawrahta II	
(Unknown)	Chief	c. November 1349	23 February 1352	Tarabya II	
Soe Min Kodawgyi	Chief	23 February 1352	April 1364	Thihapate	

=== Ava ===
==== House of Myinsaing ====
Consort	Rank	Became consort	Ceased to be consort	Spouse	Notes
Saw Omma of Pinya	Chief	September 1364	c. 3 September 1367	Thado Minbya	
Khame Mi	Chief	5 September 1367	c. 1390s	Swa Saw Ke	
Shin Saw Gyi	North	5 September 1367	c. 1390s	Swa Saw Ke	
Shin Saw Gyi	Chief	c. 1390s	April 1400	Swa Saw Ke	
Saw Omma of Sagaing	Center	5 September 1367	c. 1390s	Swa Saw Ke	
Saw Omma of Sagaing	North	c. 1390s	April 1400	Swa Saw Ke	
Saw Taw Oo	West	5 September 1367	c. 1390s	Swa Saw Ke	
Saw Taw Oo	Center	c. 1390s	April 1400	Swa Saw Ke	
Min Hla Myat	Chief	April 1400	25 November 1400	Tarabya	
Shin Saw	Chief	25 November 1400	c. February 1422	Minkhaung I	(Note: (Than Tun 1959: 125–126): An inscription dated 28 February 1409 by Queen Saw says she was a granddaughter of King Swa Saw Ke by Shin Saw Gyi. Per (Hmannan Vol. 1 2003: 440), Shin Saw (known as Hsinbyushin), Saw Khway and Min Pyan were sisters.)
Saw Khway	North	25 November 1400	c. February 1422	Minkhaung I	(Note: (Than Tun 1959: 125–126): An inscription dated 28 February 1409 by Queen Saw says she was a granddaughter of King Swa Saw Ke by Shin Saw Gyi. Per (Hmannan Vol. 1 2003: 440), Shin Saw (known as Hsinbyushin), Saw Khway and Min Pyan were sisters.)
Min Pyan	Center	25 November 1400	c. February 1422	Minkhaung I	(Note: (Than Tun 1959: 125–126): An inscription dated 28 February 1409 by Queen Saw says she was a granddaughter of King Swa Saw Ke by Shin Saw Gyi. Per (Hmannan Vol. 1 2003: 440), Shin Saw (known as Hsinbyushin), Saw Khway and Min Pyan were sisters.)
Shin Mi-Nauk	West	25 November 1400	July 1408	Minkhaung I	(Note: (Than Tun 1959: 125–126): An inscription dated 28 February 1409 by Queen Saw says she was a granddaughter of King Swa Saw Ke by Shin Saw Gyi. Per (Hmannan Vol. 1 2003: 440), Shin Saw (known as Hsinbyushin), Saw Khway and Min Pyan were sisters.)
Shin Bo-Me	West	c. August 1408	c. October 1421	Minkhaung I	(Note: (Than Tun 1959: 125–126): An inscription dated 28 February 1409 by Queen Saw says she was a granddaughter of King Swa Saw Ke by Shin Saw Gyi. Per (Hmannan Vol. 1 2003: 440), Shin Saw (known as Hsinbyushin), Saw Khway and Min Pyan were sisters.)
Saw Min Hla	Chief	c. October 1421	August 1425	Thihathu	
Shin Bo-Me	North	c. October 1421	August 1425	Thihathu	
Shin Sawbu	Center	c. January 1423	August 1425	Thihathu	
Shin Bo-Me	Chief	August 1425	November 1425	Min Hla	
Shin Bo-Me	Chief	by 9 November 1425	16 May 1426	Min Nyo	

==== House of Mohnyin ====
Consort	Rank	Became consort	Ceased to be consort	Spouse	Notes
Shin Myat Hla	Chief	16 May 1426	April 1439	Mohnyin Thado	
Shin Bo-Me	North	c. late May 1426	April 1439	Mohnyin Thado	
Shin Saw Pu	Center	by 31 August 1426	c. November/December 1429	Mohnyin Thado	(Note: Shin Saw Pu became a queen of Thado in Tawthalin 788 ME (2 August 1426–31 August 1426). She fled Ava in 791 ME (1429/30), having spent a total of 6 years and 10 months in Ava. Since she first went to Ava c. late January/early February 1423, she likely fled Ava c. November/December 1429.)
Min Hla Nyet	Chief	by 26 April 1439	January 1442	Minye Kyawswa I	
Atula Thiri Maha Yaza Dewi	Chief	by 11 March 1442	24 July 1468	Narapati I	
Ameitta Thiri Maha Dhamma Dewi	Chief	24 July 1468	c. August 1480	Thihathura I	
Atula Thiri Dhamma Dewi	Chief	c. August 1480	7 April 1501	Minkhaung II	(Note: (Hmannan Vol. 2 2003: 111): Yazawin Thit gives Mi Pongyi of Prome as the third senior queen but Hmannan rejects it.)
Tanzaung Mibaya (Minkhaung II)	North	c. August 1480	7 April 1501	Minkhaung II	(Note: (Hmannan Vol. 2 2003: 111): Yazawin Thit gives Mi Pongyi of Prome as the third senior queen but Hmannan rejects it.)
Salin Minthami	Chief	c. 1485/86	4 March 1501	Thihathura II	(Note: Salin Minthami became co-chief queen in c. 1485/86 per (Hmannan Vol. 2 2003: 111), and chief queen in 1501 per (Hmannan Vol. 2 2003: 120).)
Salin Minthami	Chief	18 April 1501	14 March 1527	Narapati II	(Note: (Hmannan Vol. 2 2003: 120): Min Taya Hnamadaw of Yamethin became queen soon after her father Minye Kyawswa's death in Waso 863 ME (15 June 1501 to 14 July 1501). (Hmannan Vol. 2 2003: 121): Dhamma Dewi of Pakhan and Taungdwin Mibaya became queens in Tabaung 863 ME (6 February 1502 to 7 March 1502). See (Hmannan Vol. 2 2003: 136–137) for the complete list of senior queens and issue.)
Salin Minthami Lat	North	18 April 1501	c. June 1501	Narapati II	(Note: (Hmannan Vol. 2 2003: 120): Min Taya Hnamadaw of Yamethin became queen soon after her father Minye Kyawswa's death in Waso 863 ME (15 June 1501 to 14 July 1501). (Hmannan Vol. 2 2003: 121): Dhamma Dewi of Pakhan and Taungdwin Mibaya became queens in Tabaung 863 ME (6 February 1502 to 7 March 1502). See (Hmannan Vol. 2 2003: 136–137) for the complete list of senior queens and issue.)
Min Taya Hnamadaw	North	July 1501	14 March 1527	Narapati II	(Note: (Hmannan Vol. 2 2003: 120): Min Taya Hnamadaw of Yamethin became queen soon after her father Minye Kyawswa's death in Waso 863 ME (15 June 1501 to 14 July 1501). (Hmannan Vol. 2 2003: 121): Dhamma Dewi of Pakhan and Taungdwin Mibaya became queens in Tabaung 863 ME (6 February 1502 to 7 March 1502). See (Hmannan Vol. 2 2003: 136–137) for the complete list of senior queens and issue.)
Dhamma Dewi	Center	February 1502	14 March 1527	Narapati II	(Note: (Hmannan Vol. 2 2003: 120): Min Taya Hnamadaw of Yamethin became queen soon after her father Minye Kyawswa's death in Waso 863 ME (15 June 1501 to 14 July 1501). (Hmannan Vol. 2 2003: 121): Dhamma Dewi of Pakhan and Taungdwin Mibaya became queens in Tabaung 863 ME (6 February 1502 to 7 March 1502). See (Hmannan Vol. 2 2003: 136–137) for the complete list of senior queens and issue.)
Taungdwin Mibaya	West	February 1502	14 March 1527	Narapati II	(Note: (Hmannan Vol. 2 2003: 120): Min Taya Hnamadaw of Yamethin became queen soon after her father Minye Kyawswa's death in Waso 863 ME (15 June 1501 to 14 July 1501). (Hmannan Vol. 2 2003: 121): Dhamma Dewi of Pakhan and Taungdwin Mibaya became queens in Tabaung 863 ME (6 February 1502 to 7 March 1502). See (Hmannan Vol. 2 2003: 136–137) for the complete list of senior queens and issue.)

==== Confederation of Shan states ====
Consort	Rank	Became consort	Ceased to be consort	Spouse	Notes
(Unknown)	Chief	14 March 1527	c. January 1533	Sawlon	(Note: The main royal chronicles do not have any record of the chief queens of Ava between 1527 and 1551. The title of the chief queen of Shan states was Maha Dewi, certainly by the Toungoo period.)
(Unknown)	Chief	c. January 1533	May 1542	Thohanbwa	(Note: The main royal chronicles do not have any record of the chief queens of Ava between 1527 and 1551. The title of the chief queen of Shan states was Maha Dewi, certainly by the Toungoo period.)
(Unknown)	Chief	June 1542	c. September 1545	Hkonmaing	(Note: The main royal chronicles do not have any record of the chief queens of Ava between 1527 and 1551. The title of the chief queen of Shan states was Maha Dewi, certainly by the Toungoo period.)
(Unknown)	Chief	c. September 1545	c. October 1551	Narapati III	(Note: The main royal chronicles do not have any record of the chief queens of Ava between 1527 and 1551. The title of the chief queen of Shan states was Maha Dewi, certainly by the Toungoo period.)
Narapati Mibaya	Chief	c. October 1551	22 January 1555	Narapati IV	

=== Prome ===
Consort	Rank	Became consort	Ceased to be consort	Spouse	Notes
Saw Myat Lay	Chief	1482	?	Thado Minsaw	
Shwe Zin Gon	Chief	February 1527	c. December 1532	Bayin Htwe	
Chit Mi	North	February 1527	c. December 1532	Bayin Htwe	
Thiri Hpone Htut	Chief	c. December 1532	c. February 1539	Narapati	
Thiri Hpone Htut	Chief	c. February 1539	19 May 1542	Minkhaung	

=== Ramanya ===
Consort	Rank	Became consort	Ceased to be consort	Spouse	Notes
May Hnin Thwe-Da	Chief	30 January 1287	c. 14 January 1307	Wareru	
Shin Saw Hla	North?	c. 1293	c. 14 January 1307	Wareru	
(Unknown)	Chief	by 28 January 1307	March 1311	Hkun Law	
May Hnin Htapi	Chief	10 April 1311	September 1323	Saw O	
Sanda Min Hla I	Chief	by 28 September 1323	April 1330	Saw Zein	
May Hnin Htapi	North	by 28 September 1323	April 1330	Saw Zein	
(Unknown)	Chief	April 1330	April 1330	Zein Pun	
Sanda Min Hla I	Chief	April 1330	May 1330	Saw E	
Sanda Min Hla I	Chief	May 1330	1348	Binnya E Law	
Tala Shin Saw Bok	North	May 1330	1348	Binnya E Law	
Sanda Min Hla II	Chief	1348	c. 1365	Binnya U	(Note: See (Pan Hla 2005: 44–45, 47) for a list of Binnya U's queens. (Pan Hla 2005: 57): Queen Sanda Min Hla II died during the rebellion by Byattaba during the 1360s. (Pan Hla 2005: 61): Thiri Maya Dewi died soon after having given birth to Razadarit.)
Hnin An Daung	North	1348	c. 1365	Binnya U	(Note: See (Pan Hla 2005: 44–45, 47) for a list of Binnya U's queens. (Pan Hla 2005: 57): Queen Sanda Min Hla II died during the rebellion by Byattaba during the 1360s. (Pan Hla 2005: 61): Thiri Maya Dewi died soon after having given birth to Razadarit.)
Hnin An Daung	Chief	c. 1365	2 January 1384	Binnya U	(Note: See (Pan Hla 2005: 44–45, 47) for a list of Binnya U's queens. (Pan Hla 2005: 57): Queen Sanda Min Hla II died during the rebellion by Byattaba during the 1360s. (Pan Hla 2005: 61): Thiri Maya Dewi died soon after having given birth to Razadarit.)
Sanda Dewi	Center	1348	c. 1365	Binnya U	(Note: See (Pan Hla 2005: 44–45, 47) for a list of Binnya U's queens. (Pan Hla 2005: 57): Queen Sanda Min Hla II died during the rebellion by Byattaba during the 1360s. (Pan Hla 2005: 61): Thiri Maya Dewi died soon after having given birth to Razadarit.)
Sanda Dewi	North	c. 1365	2 January 1384	Binnya U	(Note: See (Pan Hla 2005: 44–45, 47) for a list of Binnya U's queens. (Pan Hla 2005: 57): Queen Sanda Min Hla II died during the rebellion by Byattaba during the 1360s. (Pan Hla 2005: 61): Thiri Maya Dewi died soon after having given birth to Razadarit.)
Thiri Yaza Dewi	West	1348	c. 1365	Binnya U	(Note: See (Pan Hla 2005: 44–45, 47) for a list of Binnya U's queens. (Pan Hla 2005: 57): Queen Sanda Min Hla II died during the rebellion by Byattaba during the 1360s. (Pan Hla 2005: 61): Thiri Maya Dewi died soon after having given birth to Razadarit.)
Thiri Yaza Dewi	Center	c. 1365	2 January 1384	Binnya U	(Note: See (Pan Hla 2005: 44–45, 47) for a list of Binnya U's queens. (Pan Hla 2005: 57): Queen Sanda Min Hla II died during the rebellion by Byattaba during the 1360s. (Pan Hla 2005: 61): Thiri Maya Dewi died soon after having given birth to Razadarit.)
Thiri Maya Dewi I	West	c. 1365	c. 28 January 1368	Binnya U	(Note: See (Pan Hla 2005: 44–45, 47) for a list of Binnya U's queens. (Pan Hla 2005: 57): Queen Sanda Min Hla II died during the rebellion by Byattaba during the 1360s. (Pan Hla 2005: 61): Thiri Maya Dewi died soon after having given birth to Razadarit.)
Piya Yaza Dewi	Chief	5 January 1384	c. April 1392	Razadarit	(Note: (Pan Hla 2005: 158–160): Tala Mi Daw, the first wife of Razadarit, was never his chief queen. Per (Pan Hla 2005: 193), she committed suicide soon after Razadarit's coronation ceremony c. March 1391. According to Razadarit Ayedawbon (Pan Hla 2005: 203), Piya Yaza Dewi died, and Razadarit raised Yaza Dewi, Lawka Dewi and Thiri Maya Dewi as queens c. Kason 755 ME (11 April 1393 to 10 May 1393) soon after King Swa Saw Ke's campaign near Tharrawaddy. But Hmannan Yazawin (Hmannan Vol. 1 2003: 432) says Swa's campaign took place a year earlier. (Pan Hla 2005: 241, 266): Razadarit also raised two other queens Saw Pyei Chantha and her mother Shin Mi-Nauk in 1408 in addition to Saw Pyei Chantha's aunt Thupaba Dewi who was sent over to Razadarit in a marriage of state in 1403.)
Tala Mi Daw	North	5 January 1384	c. March 1390	Razadarit	
Yaza Dewi	Chief	c. April 1392	c. 1421	Razadarit	
Lawka Dewi	North	c. April 1392	c. 1421	Razadarit	
Thiri Maya Dewi II	Center	c. April 1392	c. 1421	Razadarit	
Mi Ta-Lat	Principal (Chief?)	1421	1424	Binnya Dhammaraza	
Yaza Dewi	Chief?	c. 1424	c. September 1446?	Binnya Ran I	
Soe Min Wimala Dewi	Chief	c. February 1431	c. September 1446	Binnya Ran I	
Ye Mibaya	Chief	1446	30 May 1451	Binnya Waru	
(Unknown)	Chief	30 May 1451	June 1453	Binnya Kyan	
(Unknown)	Chief	June 1453	c. January 1451	Leik Munhtaw	
None	N/A	c. January 1451	1471	Shin Sawbu	(Note: Shin Sawbu was the country's only historically verifiable queen regnant. According to Arakanese history (RRT Vol. 2 1999: 18–19), Saw Yin Mi was queen regnant of Sandoway (Thandwe) in the 1430s.)
Yaza Dewi II	Chief	1471	1492	Dhammazedi	
Wihara Dewi	Chief	1471	1492	Dhammazedi	
Agga Thiri Maya Dewi	Chief	1492?	1526?	Binnya Ran II	(Note: Ran's most senior queens in April 1495 per (Aung-Thwin 2017: 278–279). It is unclear if any of the queens lasted his entire reign.)
Maha Yaza Dewi	North	1492?	1526?	Binnya Ran II	(Note: Ran's most senior queens in April 1495 per (Aung-Thwin 2017: 278–279). It is unclear if any of the queens lasted his entire reign.)
Atula Dewi	Principal	1492?	1526?	Binnya Ran II	(Note: Ran's most senior queens in April 1495 per (Aung-Thwin 2017: 278–279). It is unclear if any of the queens lasted his entire reign.)
Yaza Dewi III	Principal	1492?	1526?	Binnya Ran II	(Note: Ran's most senior queens in April 1495 per (Aung-Thwin 2017: 278–279). It is unclear if any of the queens lasted his entire reign.)
(Unknown)	Chief	1526	1539	Taka Yut Pi	(Note: The only known queen of Taka Yut Pi in the chronicles was Minkhaung Medaw (known as Pegu Mibaya). But she most likely could not have been the chief queen. Per Hmannan (Hmannan Vol. 2 2003: 195–196), Minkhaung Medaw was sent to Pegu (Bago) as part of the formation of an alliance between Prome and Pegu against Toungoo.)
Minkhaung Medaw	North?	by 1535	1539	Taka Yut Pi	(Note: The only known queen of Taka Yut Pi in the chronicles was Minkhaung Medaw (known as Pegu Mibaya). But she most likely could not have been the chief queen. Per Hmannan (Hmannan Vol. 2 2003: 195–196), Minkhaung Medaw was sent to Pegu (Bago) as part of the formation of an alliance between Prome and Pegu against Toungoo.)
(Unknown)	Chief	June 1550	August 1550	Smim Sawhtut	
(Unknown)	Chief	August 1550	12 March 1552	Smim Htaw	

=== Arakan ===
==== House of Launggyet ====
Consort	Rank	Became consort	Ceased to be consort	Spouse	Notes
Saw Sit II	Chief	May 1429	9 May 1433	Saw Mon	
Saw Pyauk	North	1430	9 May 1433	Saw Mon	
Saw Paba	Chief	9 May 1433	c. January 1459	Khayi	
Saw Pyinsa	North	9 May 1433	c. January 1459	Khayi	
Saw Yin Mi	Center	1437	c. January 1459	Khayi	
Saw Nandi	Chief	c. January 1459	5 August 1482	Saw Phyu	
Saw Htin	North	c. January 1459	5 August 1482	Saw Phyu	
Thu Rakhaing	Chief	5 August 1482	c. February 1492	Dawlya	
Shwe Einthe	North	5 August 1482	c. February 1492	Dawlya	
Saw Htwe Me	Chief	c. February 1492	c. January 1494	Saw Nyo	
Saw Nandi	North	c. February 1492	c. January 1494	Saw Nyo	
Min Gahna	Center	c. February 1492	c. January 1494	Saw Nyo	
Saw Shin Saw	Chief	c. January 1494	c. July 1494	Ran Aung	
Saw Mi Saw	Chief	c. July 1494	February 1502	Salingathu	
Saw Thuba	Chief	February 1502	c. November 1513	Raza I	
Shin Pwa	North	February 1502	c. November 1513	Raza I	
Shin Pyo	Center	February 1502	c. November 1513	Raza I	
Saw Thuza	Chief	c. November 1513	January 1515	Gazapati	
Taung Nan Mibaya	Chief	January 1515	July 1515	Saw O	
Saw Nanzet	Chief	July 1515	c. April 1421	Thazata	
Saw Nanzet	Chief	c. April 1421	27 May 1531	Minkhaung	
Saw Min Hla	Chief	27 May 1531	11 January 1554	Min Bin	(Note: See (RRT Vol. 2 1999: 29, 34) for Saw Min Hla and Saw Kauk Ma. Rakhine Razawin Thit (RRT Vol. 2 1999: 33) says Minkhaung Medaw was presented by King Tabinshwehti on 27 February 1547. But per (Hmannan Vol. 2 2003: 195–196), she was sent to Mrauk-U c. 1540 by King Minkhaung of Prome.)
Saw Kauk Ma I	North	27 May 1531	11 January 1554	Min Bin	(Note: See (RRT Vol. 2 1999: 29, 34) for Saw Min Hla and Saw Kauk Ma. Rakhine Razawin Thit (RRT Vol. 2 1999: 33) says Minkhaung Medaw was presented by King Tabinshwehti on 27 February 1547. But per (Hmannan Vol. 2 2003: 195–196), she was sent to Mrauk-U c. 1540 by King Minkhaung of Prome.)
Minkhaung Medaw	Center?	by 1540	11 January 1554	Min Bin	(Note: See (RRT Vol. 2 1999: 29, 34) for Saw Min Hla and Saw Kauk Ma. Rakhine Razawin Thit (RRT Vol. 2 1999: 33) says Minkhaung Medaw was presented by King Tabinshwehti on 27 February 1547. But per (Hmannan Vol. 2 2003: 195–196), she was sent to Mrauk-U c. 1540 by King Minkhaung of Prome.)
Saw Thanda	Chief	11 January 1554	6 March 1556	Dikkha	
Saw Mi Lat	North	11 January 1554	6 March 1556	Dikkha	
Saw Kauk Ma II	Center	11 January 1554	6 March 1556	Dikkha	
Saw Hpone Htut	Chief	6 March 1556	24 July 1564	Saw Hla	(Note: (RRT Vol. 2 1999: 46): Saw Thanda's official title during Saw Hla's reign was Tanzaung Mibaya.)
Saw Thanda	North	6 March 1556	24 July 1564	Saw Hla	(Note: (RRT Vol. 2 1999: 46): Saw Thanda's official title during Saw Hla's reign was Tanzaung Mibaya.)
Dhamma Dewi I	Chief	24 July 1564	1565–68	Sekkya	(Note: (RRT Vol. 2 1999: 47): Dhamma Dewi died sometime between Thadingyut 927 (5 October to 2 November 1565) and Thadingyut 930 (1 October to 29 October 1568), and was succeeded by Saw Thanda.)
Saw Thanda	North	24 July 1564	1565–68	Sekkya	(Note: (RRT Vol. 2 1999: 47): Dhamma Dewi died sometime between Thadingyut 927 (5 October to 2 November 1565) and Thadingyut 930 (1 October to 29 October 1568), and was succeeded by Saw Thanda.)
Saw Thanda	Chief	1565–68	7 February 1572	Sekkya	(Note: (RRT Vol. 2 1999: 47): Dhamma Dewi died sometime between Thadingyut 927 (5 October to 2 November 1565) and Thadingyut 930 (1 October to 29 October 1568), and was succeeded by Saw Thanda.)
Saw Mi Taw	Chief	7 February 1572	4 July 1593	Phalaung	(Note: Phalaung's queens apparently were not ranked according to tradition. Per (RRT Vol. 2 1999: 48), Saw Mi Taw was the chief queen, followed by Saw Thanda the South Queen. The third ranked queen Shin Lat was officially "Nan Htet Mibaya" (နန်းထက် မိဖုရား), "Queen of the Exalted Palace"), followed by Saw U the North Queen.)
Saw Thanda	South	7 February 1572	4 July 1593	Phalaung	(Note: Phalaung's queens apparently were not ranked according to tradition. Per (RRT Vol. 2 1999: 48), Saw Mi Taw was the chief queen, followed by Saw Thanda the South Queen. The third ranked queen Shin Lat was officially "Nan Htet Mibaya" (နန်းထက် မိဖုရား), "Queen of the Exalted Palace"), followed by Saw U the North Queen.)
Shin Lat I	Center	7 February 1572	4 July 1593	Phalaung	(Note: Phalaung's queens apparently were not ranked according to tradition. Per (RRT Vol. 2 1999: 48), Saw Mi Taw was the chief queen, followed by Saw Thanda the South Queen. The third ranked queen Shin Lat was officially "Nan Htet Mibaya" (နန်းထက် မိဖုရား), "Queen of the Exalted Palace"), followed by Saw U the North Queen.)
Saw U	North	7 February 1572	4 July 1593	Phalaung	(Note: Phalaung's queens apparently were not ranked according to tradition. Per (RRT Vol. 2 1999: 48), Saw Mi Taw was the chief queen, followed by Saw Thanda the South Queen. The third ranked queen Shin Lat was officially "Nan Htet Mibaya" (နန်းထက် မိဖုရား), "Queen of the Exalted Palace"), followed by Saw U the North Queen.)
Wizala Dewi	Chief	4 July 1593	4 July 1612	Raza II	(Note: The chronicle Rakhine Razawin Thit (RRT Vol. 2 1999: 87) says Raza II had nine senior queens during his reign but gives only six names. "Nine" was most likely a typographical/copying error since Burmese numerals six (၆) and nine (၉) are very similar. Khin Ma Hnaung's official title was Tanzaung Mibaya (တန်ဆောင်း မိဖုရား, "Queen of the Royal Hall"), which was likely the title of the second ranked queen. (Saw Thanda, the second ranked queen, during Saw Hla's reign was also Tanzaung Mibaya per (RRT Vol. 2 1999: 46). Similarly, Nan Htet Mibaya apparently was the title of the third ranked queen; Thupaba Dewi, the third ranked queen of Raza II, was Nan Htet Mibaya. Furthermore, the chronicle does not mention if any of the queens lived to the end of Raza II's reign. The chief queen presumably made it since there is no mention of other chief queens.)
Pyinsala Sanda	North	4 July 1593	?	Raza II	
Thupaba Dewi	Center	4 July 1593	?	Raza II	
Zalaka Dewi	West	4 July 1593	?	Raza II	
Khin Ma Hnaung	North?	19 December 1599	4 July 1612?	Raza II	
Saw Phyu	Center?	c. 17th century	4 July 1612?	Raza II	
Dhamma Dewi II	Chief	4 July 1612	14 May 1622	Khamaung	
Shin Htwe	North	4 July 1612	14 May 1622	Khamaung	
Thupaba Dewi	Center	4 July 1612	14 May 1622	Khamaung	
Natshin Me	Chief	14 May 1622	29 May 1638	Thiri Thudhamma I	
Hmauk Taw Ma I	North	14 May 1622	29 May 1638	Thiri Thudhamma I	
Win Lon	Center	1630s?	29 May 1638	Thiri Thudhamma I	
Win Lon	Chief	29 May 1638	17 June 1638	Sanay	

==== Late Mrauk-U ====
Consort	Rank	Became consort	Ceased to be consort	Spouse	Notes
Natshin Me	Chief	17 June 1638	13 December 1645	Narapati	
Yadana I	Chief	13 December 1645	May 1652	Thado	(Note: Another case of the South Queen not being the chief per (RRT Vol. 2 1999: 115))
Shin Lat II	South	13 December 1645	May 1652	Thado	(Note: Another case of the South Queen not being the chief per (RRT Vol. 2 1999: 115))
Saw Bo-Me	North	13 December 1645	May 1652	Thado	(Note: Another case of the South Queen not being the chief per (RRT Vol. 2 1999: 115))
Saw Phyu	West	13 December 1645	May 1652	Thado	(Note: Another case of the South Queen not being the chief per (RRT Vol. 2 1999: 115))
Yadana II	Chief	May 1652	11 June 1674	Sanda Thudhamma	
Thuwana Kalaya	Chief	11 June 1674	16 April 1685	Thiri Thudhamma II	
Thukomma	Chief	16 April 1685	20 June 1692	Wara Dhamma	(Note: (RRT Vol. 2 1999: 118): Several people, including queens, concubines and their attendants, died during a major fire at the palace on 16 February 1686. Presumably, Thukomma survived the fire since the chronicle reports no other chief queen of Wara.)
Thubara	Chief	20 June 1692	7 November 1693	Mani Thudhamma	(Note: (RRT Vol. 2 1999: 119–120): The Palace Guards installed and removed their puppet kings Wara Dhamma, Mani Thudhamma and Sanda Thuriya I, as they pleased.)
Thukomma	Chief	7 November 1693	3 February 1694	Wara Dhamma	(Note: (RRT Vol. 2 1999: 119–120): The Palace Guards installed and removed their puppet kings Wara Dhamma, Mani Thudhamma and Sanda Thuriya I, as they pleased.)
Thubara	Chief	20 December 1694	17 February 1695	Sanda Thuriya I	(Note: (RRT Vol. 2 1999: 119–120): The Palace Guards installed and removed their puppet kings Wara Dhamma, Mani Thudhamma and Sanda Thuriya I, as they pleased.)
Thukomma	Chief	17 February 1695	11 April 1696	Wara Dhamma	(Note: (RRT Vol. 2 1999: 119–120): The Palace Guards installed and removed their puppet kings Wara Dhamma, Mani Thudhamma and Sanda Thuriya I, as they pleased.)
Thubara	Chief	11 April 1696	4 August 1696	Sanda Thuriya I	(Note: (RRT Vol. 2 1999: 119–120): The Palace Guards installed and removed their puppet kings Wara Dhamma, Mani Thudhamma and Sanda Thuriya I, as they pleased.)
Thukhuma	Chief	4 August 1696	18 August 1696	Nawrahta	
Eindama	Chief	18 August 1696	13 May 1697	Marompiya	
Pwa Me	Chief	13 May 1697	5 June 1698	Kalamandat	
Nan Htet Mibaya I	Chief	5 June 1698	17 June 1700	Naradipati I	
Pwa Saw	Chief	17 June 1700	30 March 1707	Sanda Wimala I	
Pwa Thway	Chief	3 April 1707	August 1710	Sanda Thuriya II	
Shwe Ku	Chief	August 1710	October 1719	Sanda Wizaya I	
(Unknown)	Chief	October 1719	April 1731	Sanda Wizaya I	
Hmauk Taw Ma II	Chief	April 1731	1734	Sanda Thuriya III	
Nan Htet Mibaya II	Chief	1734	1735	Naradipati II	
Nan Htet Mibaya II	Chief	1735	August 1737	Narapawara	
Nan Htet Mibaya II	Chief	August 1737	25 March 1738	Sanda Wizaya II	
Shwe Yi	Chief	28 March 1738	6 February 1743	Madarit	
Saw Thanda II	Chief	6 February 1743	28 October 1761	Nara Apaya	
Tanzaung Mibaya	Chief	28 October 1761	3 February 1762	Thirithu	
Aung Kyawt San	Chief	3 February 1762	1 May 1764	Sanda Parama	
Saw Shwe Kya	Chief	1 May 1764	17 January 1774	Apaya	
Pan Thuza	Chief	17 January 1774	22 April 1777	Sanda Thumana	
Ma Me Gyi	North	27 August 1775	22 April 1777	Sanda Thumana	
Da Phyu	Chief	23 April 1777	2 June 1777	Sanda Wimala II	
Sein Khaing	Center	?	2 June 1777	Sanda Wimala II	
Sein Khaing	Chief	2 June 1777	June 1778	Sanda Thaditha	
Aung Me	South	2 June 1777	3 November 1782	Sanda Thaditha	
Chi Me	Chief	11 June 1778	3 November 1782	Sanda Thaditha	
Saw Me Pon	Chief	4 November 1782	2 January 1785	Maha Thammada	

== Toungoo dynasty ==
=== House of Toungoo ===
Consort	Rank	Became consort	Ceased to be consort	Spouse	Notes
Soe Min Hteik-Tin	Chief	16 October 1510	24 November 1530?	Mingyi Nyo	
Thiri Maha Sanda Dewi	North	16 October 1510	24 November 1530?	Mingyi Nyo	
Yadana Dewi	Center	16 October 1510	24 November 1530?	Mingyi Nyo	
Maha Dewi	West	16 October 1510	24 November 1530?	Mingyi Nyo	
Dhamma Dewi	Chief	24 November 1530	30 April 1550	Tabinshwehti	(Note: (Sein Lwin Lay 2006: 127, footnote 2): According to Sein Lwin Lay, Tabinshwehti may not have had a chief queen in the formal sense that he never formally had a formal coronation ceremony with any of his queens; and Khay Ma Naw, whom the king married at the 1545 coronation, nonetheless was not mentioned as his chief queen either.)
Khin Myat	North	24 November 1530	30 April 1550	Tabinshwehti	(Note: (Sein Lwin Lay 2006: 127, footnote 2): According to Sein Lwin Lay, Tabinshwehti may not have had a chief queen in the formal sense that he never formally had a formal coronation ceremony with any of his queens; and Khay Ma Naw, whom the king married at the 1545 coronation, nonetheless was not mentioned as his chief queen either.)
Khay Ma Naw	Co-chief	c. May 1545	30 April 1550	Tabinshwehti	(Note: (Sein Lwin Lay 2006: 127, footnote 2): According to Sein Lwin Lay, Tabinshwehti may not have had a chief queen in the formal sense that he never formally had a formal coronation ceremony with any of his queens; and Khay Ma Naw, whom the king married at the 1545 coronation, nonetheless was not mentioned as his chief queen either.)
Atula Thiri	Chief	30 April 1550	15 June 1568	Bayinnaung	
Sanda Dewi	North	April 1553	15 June 1568	Bayinnaung	
Sanda Dewi	Chief	15 June 1568	10 October 1581	Bayinnaung	
Yaza Dewi	Center	17 March 1563	13 September 1564	Bayinnaung	
Hanthawaddy Mibaya	Chief	10 October 1581	19 December 1599	Nanda	(Note: This is a rare instance where the South Queen was not the chief queen. The two standard chronicles Maha Yazawin (Maha Yazawin Vol. 3 2006: 103) and Hmannan Yazawin (Hmannan Vol. 3 2003: 107) both say that Min Phyu, Min Htwe and Min Pu were South, Center and North Queens, respectively, while Hanthawaddy was the chief queen. Yazawin Thit (Yazawin Thit Vol. 2 2012: 239) omits the ranks of Min Phyu and Min Htwe, and confirms only that Thiri Yaza Dewi was the North Queen. All chronicles list Min Taya Medaw as the fifth senior queen but do not say when she became a senior queen. She certainly should have become a senior queen after the death of Min Phyu in 1596.)
Min Phyu	South	c. 5 May 1583	4 May 1596	Nanda	
Thiri Yaza Dewi	North	c. 5 May 1583	19 December 1599	Nanda	
Min Htwe	Center	c. 5 May 1583	19 December 1599	Nanda	
Min Taya Medaw	West	c. 1583	19 December 1599	Nanda	

=== House of Nyaungyan ===
Consort	Rank	Became consort	Ceased to be consort	Spouse	Notes
Khin Hpone Myint	Chief	19 December 1599	5 November 1605	Nyaungyan	
Atula Sanda Dewi I	Chief	8 February 1609	9 July 1628	Anaukpetlun	
Khin Hnin Paw	Chief	9 July 1628	19 August 1629	Minye Deibba	(Note: Chronicles, which regard Minye Deibba as a usurper, do not list any of his "queens". Per (Hmannan Vol. 3: 189), Khin Hnin Paw was his lover. Presumably, she was his "queen" during his short reign.)
Khin Myo Sit	Chief	19 August 1629	27 August 1648	Thalun	
Atula Sanda Dewi II	Chief	27 August 1648	3 June 1661	Pindale	
Min Phyu	Chief	3 June 1661	14 April 1672	Pye	
None	N/A	14 April 1672	27 February 1673	Narawara	(Note: (Hmannan Vol. 3 2003: 289): Narawara had no queens or concubines whatsoever.)
Atula Thiri Maha Dewi	Chief	27 February 1673	4 May 1698	Minye Kyawhtin	
Sanda Dewi	North	27 February 1673	4 May 1698	Minye Kyawhtin	
Yaza Dewi	Center	27 February 1673	4 May 1698	Minye Kyawhtin	
Maha Dewi	Chief	4 May 1698	22 August 1714	Sanay	
Thiri Dewi	North	4 May 1698	22 August 1714	Sanay	
Nanda Dewi	Center	4 May 1698	22 August 1714	Sanay	
Thiri Maha Mingala Dewi	Chief	22 August 1714	14 November 1733	Taninganway	
Thiri Sanda Dewi	North	22 August 1714	14 November 1733	Taninganway	
Thiri Dhamma Dewi	Center	22 August 1714	14 November 1733	Taninganway	
Maha Nanda Dipadi Dewi	Chief	14 November 1733	22 March 1752	Maha Dhamma Yaza Dipadi	
Maha Yaza Dipadi Dewi	North	14 November 1733	22 March 1752	Maha Dhamma Yaza Dipadi	
Maha Dipadi Dewi	Center	14 November 1733	22 March 1752	Maha Dhamma Yaza Dipadi	

== Restored Hanthawaddy ==
Consort	Rank	Became consort	Ceased to be consort	Spouse	Notes
Thiri Seitta	Chief	c. January 1741	January 1747	Smim Htaw	(Note: (Lieberman 1984: 215–216): Smim Htaw came to power on 8 December [O.S. 27 November] 1740. Hmannan (Hmannan Vol. 3 2003: 373) says the Lord of Chiang Mai sent his daughter soon after.)
Hanthawaddy Mibaya II	Chief	January 1747	6 May 1757	Binnya Dala	(Note: Chronicles (Konbaung Set Vol. 1 simply call Binnya Dala's chief queen Hanthawaddy Shin Mibaya (lit. Queen of Hanthawaddy). Her title or personal name is not known. (Konbaung Set Vol. 1 2004: 187): Thiri Zeya Mingala Dewi, Princess of Manipur, became Binnya Dala's queen after the fall of Ava (Inwa) on 22 March 1752. She came along with Gen. Dalaban who submitted to Alaungpaya on 9th waxing of Pyatho 1118 ME (29 December 1756). She later became a concubine of Alaungpaya per (Konbaung Set Vol. 1 2004: 197).)
Thiri Zeya Mingala Dewi	North	22 March 1752	29 December 1756	Binnya Dala	

== Konbaung dynasty ==
Consort	Rank	Became consort	Ceased to be consort	Spouse	Notes
Yun San	Chief	29 February 1752	11 May 1760	Alaungpaya	
Maha Mingala Yadana Dewi	Chief	11 May 1760	28 November 1763	Naungdawgyi	
Mingala Dewi	North	11 May 1760	28 November 1763	Naungdawgyi	
Thiri Atula Maha Yadana Padomma Dewi	Chief	28 November 1763	10 June 1776	Hsinbyushin	
Thiri Thuriya Nanda Maha Mingala Dewi	North	28 November 1763	10 June 1776	Hsinbyushin	
Maha Mingala Sanda Dewi I	Center	28 November 1763	10 June 1776	Hsinbyushin	
Maha Yadana Sanda Dewi	Chief	10 June 1776	5 February 1782	Singu	
Thiri Maha Mingala Dewi I	North	10 June 1776	c. 20 May 1777	Singu	
Thiri Maha Nanda Dewi	Center	10 June 1776	c. 20 May 1777	Singu	
Thiri Maha Nanda Dewi	North	c. 20 May 1777	5 February 1782	Singu	
Maha Mingala Sanda Dewi II	Center	c. 20 May 1777	5 February 1782	Singu	
Thiri Sanda Mahay	West	c. 20 May 1777	5 February 1782	Singu	
Shin Paik Thaung	Chief	5 February 1782	11 February 1782	Phaungka	
Thiri Nanda Dewi	North	5 February 1782	11 February 1782	Phaungka	
Mingala Yadana Dewi	Chief	11 February 1782	24 February 1807	Bodawpaya	
Thiri Maha Sandabi Yadana Dewi I	North	11 February 1782	4 January 1807	Bodawpaya	
Thiri Maha Nandabi Yadana Dewi I	Center	11 February 1782	3 September 1789	Bodawpaya	
Thiri Maha Mingala Dewi II	Center	3 September 1789	5 June 1819	Bodawpaya	
Thiri Maha Yadana Dewi I	North	4 January 1807	10 July 1812	Bodawpaya	
Nanmadaw Me Nu	Chief	5 June 1819	15 April 1837	Bagyidaw	
Thiri Kalaya Sanda Dewi	North	3 November 1819	23 February 1824	Bagyidaw	
Thiri Paba Malla Dewi	Center	3 November 1819	23 February 1824	Bagyidaw	
Thiri Maha Mingala Dewi III	North	23 February 1824	15 April 1837	Bagyidaw	
Thiri Maha Sanda Dewi	Center	23 February 1824	15 April 1837	Bagyidaw	
Thiri Malla Yadana Mahay	West	23 February 1824	15 April 1837	Bagyidaw	
Thiri Pawara Ti Lawka Maha Yadana Padomma Dewi	Chief	15 April 1837	17 November 1846	Tharrawaddy	
Thiri Maha Nandabi Yadana Dewi II	North	15 April 1837	17 November 1846	Tharrawaddy	
Thiri Maha Sandabi Yadana Dewi II	Center	15 April 1837	17 November 1846	Tharrawaddy	
Thiri Thu Yadana Dewi II	West	15 April 1837	c. 16 October 1845	Tharrawaddy	
Thiri Ti Lawka Maha Yadana Dewi	Chief	17 November 1846	18 February 1853	Pagan	
Thiri Maha Yadana Dewi II	North	17 November 1846	18 February 1853	Pagan	
Thiri Ti Lawka Atula Yadana Dewi	Center	17 November 1846	18 February 1853	Pagan	
Thiri Thu Yadana Mingala Dewi	Center	17 November 1846	18 February 1853	Pagan	
Thiri Pawara Maha Yazeinda Yadana Dewi	Chief	26 March 1853	12 November 1876	Mindon	
Thiri Maha Yadana Mingala Dewi	North	26 March 1853	3 May 1872	Mindon	
Maha Yazeinda Dipadi Padomma Yadana Dewi	Center	26 March 1853	1 October 1878	Mindon	
Thiri Maha Thu Sanda Dewi	West	26 March 1853	26 July 1855	Mindon	
Thiri Maha Yadana Dewi	West	26 July 1855	1 October 1878	Mindon	
Supayagyi	Chief	30 October 1878	12 April 1879	Thibaw	(Note: (Konbaung Set Vol. 3 2004: 323, 344–345): Su Paya Gyi's nominal reign as chief queen officially ended at the coronation ceremony held at the start of Thingyan (new year's festival) of 1241 ME.)
Supayalat	North	18 November 1878	12 April 1879	Thibaw	(Note: (Konbaung Set Vol. 3 2004: 323, 344–345): Su Paya Gyi's nominal reign as chief queen officially ended at the coronation ceremony held at the start of Thingyan (new year's festival) of 1241 ME.)
Supayalat	Chief	12 April 1879	29 November 1885	Thibaw	(Note: (Konbaung Set Vol. 3 2004: 323, 344–345): Su Paya Gyi's nominal reign as chief queen officially ended at the coronation ceremony held at the start of Thingyan (new year's festival) of 1241 ME.)

== See also ==
- List of Burmese leaders
- List of Burmese monarchs
- Burmese monarchs' family tree

== Bibliography ==
- Athwa, Sayadaw (1923) [1785]. Slapat Rajawan (in Burmese). Yangon: Burma Publishing Workers Association Press.
- Aung-Thwin, Michael A.; Maitrii Aung-Thwin (2012). A History of Myanmar Since Ancient Times (illustrated ed.). Honolulu: University of Hawai'i Press. ISBN 978-1-86189-901-9.
- Aung-Thwin, Michael A. (2017). Myanmar in the Fifteenth Century. Honolulu: University of Hawai'i Press. ISBN 978-0-8248-6783-6.
- Ba Shin, Bo-Hmu (1982) [1966]. "The Pwa Saws of Bagan" (PDF). Burma Historical Research Department Silver Jubilee Publication (in Burmese). Yangon: University of Yangon. Archived from the original (PDF) on 2016-03-04.
- Harvey, G. E. (1925). History of Burma: From the Earliest Times to 10 March 1824. London: Frank Cass & Co. Ltd.
- Hla Pe, U (1985). Burma: Literature, Historiography, Scholarship, Language, Life, and Buddhism. Singapore: Institute of Southeast Asian Studies. ISBN 978-9971-988-00-5.
- Htin Aung, Maung (1970). Burmese History before 1287: A Defence of the Chronicles. Oxford: The Asoka Society.
- Kala, U (2006) [1724]. Maha Yazawin (in Burmese). Vol. 1–3 (4th printing ed.). Yangon: Ya-Pyei Publishing.
- Lieberman, Victor B. (2014) [1984]. Burmese Administrative Cycles: Anarchy and Conquest, c. 1580–1760. Princeton University Press. ISBN 0-691-05407-X.
- Maha Sithu (2012) [1798]. Myint Swe; Kyaw Win; Thein Hlaing (eds.). Yazawin Thit (in Burmese). Vol. 1–3 (2nd printing ed.). Yangon: Ya-Pyei Publishing.
- Maung Maung Tin, U (1905). Konbaung Set Yazawin (in Burmese). Vol. 1–3 (2004 ed.). Yangon: Department of Universities History Research, University of Yangon.
- Pan Hla, Nai (2005) [1968]. Razadarit Ayedawbon (in Burmese) (8th printing ed.). Yangon: Armanthit Sarpay.
- Royal Historical Commission of Burma (2003) [1832]. Hmannan Yazawin (in Burmese). Vol. 1–3. Yangon: Ministry of Information, Myanmar.
- Sandamala Linkara, Ashin (1931). Rakhine Razawin Thit (in Burmese). Vol. 1–2 (1997–1999 ed.). Yangon: Tetlan Sarpay.
- Scott, J. George (1900). Gazetteer of Upper Burma and the Shan States. Vol. 2. Rangoon: Superintendent, Government Printing, Burma.
- Sein Lwin Lay, Kahtika U (2006) [1968]. Mintaya Shwe Hti and Bayinnaung: Ketumadi Taungoo Yazawin (in Burmese) (2nd printing ed.). Yangon: Yan Aung Sarpay.
- Than Tun (December 1959). "History of Burma: A.D. 1300–1400". Journal of Burma Research Society. XLII (II).
- Than Tun (1964). Studies in Burmese History (in Burmese). Vol. 1. Yangon: Maha Dagon.
- Yi Yi (1982) [1960]. "Life at the Burmese Court under the Konbaung Kings" (PDF). Burma Historical Research Department Silver Jubilee Publication. Yangon: University of Yangon. Archived from the original (PDF) on 2016-03-04.
