= Taung Pyinthe =

Taung Pyinthe was a Pagan era Burmese royal title that means "Queen of the Southern Palace". As it was equivalent to the office of the chief queen consort, all the chief queens were technically Taung Pyinthe. But the following chief queens of the era were reported simply as Taung Pyinthe without any other distinguishing titles or personal names.

- Taung Pyinthe (Saw Rahan II): Chief Queen of Pagan (?–1014)
- Taung Pyinthe (Sithu I): Queen of the Southern Palace of Burma (1112–?)
- Taung Pyinthe (Narathu): Chief Queen of Burma (1167–71)
- Taung Pyinthe II (Sithu II): Chief Queen of Burma (1186–1211)
