= Saw Mi Pyan of Pagan =

Saw Mi Pyan စောမိပြန်

Queen of the Central Palace
- Tenure: 1211 – 1231 or 1235
- Predecessor: Saw Mya Kan
- Successor: vacant
- Born: Myittha
- Died: Pagan (Bagan)?
- Spouse: Htilominlo
- Issue: none
- House: Pagan
- Religion: Theravada Buddhism

Saw Mi Pyan (Burmese: စောမိပြန်}, pronounced [sɔ́ mḭ bjàɴ]) was the Queen of the Central Palace of King Htilominlo of the Pagan Dynasty of Myanmar (Burma). The queen, who was a great granddaughter of King Sithu I, had no children.

== Bibliography ==
- Kala, U (1724). Maha Yazawin (in Burmese). Vol. 1–3 (2006, 4th printing ed.). Yangon: Ya-Pyei Publishing.
- Maha Sithu (2012) [1798]. Kyaw Win; Thein Hlaing (eds.). Yazawin Thit (in Burmese). Vol. 1–3 (2nd ed.). Yangon: Ya-Pyei Publishing.
- Royal Historical Commission of Burma (1832). Hmannan Yazawin (in Burmese). Vol. 1–3 (2003 ed.). Yangon: Ministry of Information, Myanmar.

Saw Mi Pyan of Pagan Pagan Kingdom
Royal titles
Preceded by Saw Mya Kan	Queen of the Central Palace; 18 August 1211 – 1231 or 19 July 1235	Vacant
