= Wadanthika =

Wadanthika ဝဋံသိကာ

Queen of the Central Palace
- Tenure: c. 1190s – 1190s
- Predecessor: Saw Ahlwan
- Successor: Saw Mya Kan
- Born: Pagan (Bagan)
- Died: c. 1190s Pagan
- Spouse: Sithu II
- Issue: Yazathu; Pyanchi; Gingathu
- House: Pagan
- Religion: Theravada Buddhism

Wadanthika (Burmese: ဝဋံသိကာ, pronounced [wədàɴθḭgà]) was the second Queen of the Central Palace of King Sithu II of the Pagan Dynasty of Myanmar (Burma). She may also have been Sithu II's chief queen for a brief period.

Chronicles do not identify her by her personal name; they identify her simply as younger sister of Thubarit, and mother of Yazathu, Pyanchi and Gingathu. (Note: See (Maha Yazawin Vol. 1 2006: 212) and (Hmannan Vol. 1 2003: 317–318). (Yazawin Thit Vol. 1 2012: 133) gives only Yazathura and Pyanchi (not Gingathu) as her children.) But contemporary inscriptional evidence shows that the name of the queen of Sithu II and the mother of Yazathu, Pyanchi and Gingathu was Wadanthika. According to the chronicle Yazawin Thit, she was Ale Pyinthe or Queen of the Central Palace, and was a grandniece of Queen Yadanabon I of Pagan. Inscriptional evidence as well as Maha Yazawin and Hmannan Yazawin chronicles say that she had the title Usaukpan, which according to Than Tun meant the chief queen. (Note: (Than Tun 1964: 129) translates Usaukpan as Hteik-khaung-tin Mibaya, or chief queen.) If so, Sithu II may have continued to keep the offices of the chief queen and the Queen of the Southern Palace separate. (His first chief queen Weluwaddy, and the first South Queen was Min Aung Myat.)

Wadanthika died soon after the birth of her third child.

== Bibliography ==
- Kala, U (1724). Maha Yazawin (in Burmese). Vol. 1–3 (2006, 4th printing ed.). Yangon: Ya-Pyei Publishing.
- Maha Sithu (2012) [1798]. Kyaw Win; Thein Hlaing (eds.). Yazawin Thit (in Burmese). Vol. 1–3 (2nd ed.). Yangon: Ya-Pyei Publishing.
- Royal Historical Commission of Burma (1832). Hmannan Yazawin (in Burmese). Vol. 1–3 (2003 ed.). Yangon: Ministry of Information, Myanmar.
- Than Tun (1964). Studies in Burmese History (in Burmese). Vol. 1. Yangon: Maha Dagon.

Wadanthika Pagan Kingdom
Royal titles
Preceded by Saw Ahlwan	Queen of the Central Palace c. 1190s – 1190s	Succeeded by Saw Mya Kan
