= Taung Pyinthe (Sithu I) =

Taung Pyinthe တောင်ပြင်သည်

Queen of the Southern Palace
- Tenure: 1112 – ?
- Predecessor: Thanbula as Chief Queen
- Successor: Ti Lawka Sanda Dewi as Chief Queen
- Born: c. 1090s Pagan (Bagan)
- Died: Pagan
- Spouse: Sithu I
- Issue: Taung Phya; Shwe Kyu
- House: Pagan
- Religion: Theravada Buddhism

Taung Pyinthe (Burmese: တောင်ပြင်သည်, pronounced [tàʊɴ bjìɴ ðɛ̀]; lit. "Queen of the Southern Palace") was a queen consort of King Sithu I of the Pagan Dynasty of Myanmar (Burma).

The royal chronicles do not state her personal name or any other distinguishing titles. Based on her title as Queen of the Southern Palace, she technically should have been the chief queen but chronicles list her fourth in line behind queens Yadanabon, Ti Lawka Sanda Dewi and Yazakumari. Chronicles also say that all four senior queens participated in Sithu's coronation ceremony when traditionally only the chief queen would.

The queen and Sithu I had two daughters: Taung Phya and Shwe Kyu. Her younger sister Khin U, a four-time widow and mother of four daughters, became a consort of Sithu I.

== Bibliography ==
- Maha Sithu (2012) [1798]. Kyaw Win; Thein Hlaing (eds.). Yazawin Thit (in Burmese). Vol. 1–3 (2nd ed.). Yangon: Ya-Pyei Publishing.
- Royal Historical Commission of Burma (1832). Hmannan Yazawin (in Burmese). Vol. 1–3 (2003 ed.). Yangon: Ministry of Information, Myanmar.

Taung Pyinthe (Sithu I) Pagan Kingdom
Royal titles
Preceded by Thanbula as Chief Queen	Queen of the Southern Palace; 1112 – ?	Succeeded by Ti Lawka Sanda Dewi as Chief Queen
