= Thiri Thuriya =

Thiri Thuddhama II Ugga-bala Raza of Mrauk U သီရီသုဓမ္မ ၂ ဥဂ္ဂါဗလာရာဇာ

King of Arakan
- Reign: 21 December 1684 - 18 April 1685
- Coronation: 21 December 1684
- Predecessor: Sanda Thudhamma
- Successor: Wara Dhammaraza
- Born: c. 1650s Mrauk U
- Died: 18 April 1685; Hkrit
- Consort: Thuwanna Kayla
- Issue: Thaungnyo
Names
- Shwenanthakin Thiri Thuriya Thuddhama Uggabala Raza ရွှေနန်းသခင် သိရီသုရီယ သုဓမ္မ ဥဂ္ဂါဗလာရာဇာ
- House: Narapatigyi
- Father: Sanda Thudhamma
- Religion: Therevada Buddhism

Ugga-bala (Arakanese:ဥဂ္ဂါဗလာ), was the 25th king of the Mrauk-U Dynasty of Arakan. He succeeded his father, Sanda Thudhamma after his death in 1684.

== Early Life and Ascension ==
Ugga Balla was still very young when he ascended the throne following the death of his father, Candasudhammaraja, in 1684. Before his death, Candasudhammaraja had nominated Ugga Balla as his successor, although some officials, known as Sit-kes, appeared to support the king’s brother instead. The situation at court was tense, and civil war was feared by contemporary observers such as VOC (Dutch East India Company) chief Dirk Vonck.

== Reign ==
After becoming king, Ugga Balla decided to leave the capital Mrauk U and build a new palace at Khrip, a site of an ancient Arakanese capital from the Lemro era. This move was partly necessitated because Canda sudhammaraja had burned the old palace at Mrauk U in 1683. However, the reasons for abandoning Mrauk U completely remain unclear.

Soon after his ascension, Ugga Balla’s rule was challenged by his uncle, the governor of Sandoway. In October 1684, his uncle sailed up the Kaladan River to confront him. The outcome of this confrontation is uncertain, but the uncle continued to play an important political role during the following reign.

== Death ==
Ugga Balla died in April 1685, after ruling for only eleven months. His death triggered a bloody revolt by the palace guards at Khrip. The guards invaded the palace, killed the princesses, concubines, and ministers, plundered the royal treasures, and took many captives as slaves.

Ugga Balla was succeeded by Waradhammaraja.

== Bibliography ==
- Harvey, G. E. (1925). History of Burma: From the Earliest Times to 10 March 1824. London: Frank Cass & Co. Ltd.
- Myat Soe, ed. (1964). Myanma Swezon Kyan (in Burmese). Vol. 9 (1 ed.). Yangon: Sarpay Beikman.
- Myint-U, Thant (2006). The River of Lost Footsteps—Histories of Burma. Farrar, Straus and Giroux. ISBN 978-0-374-16342-6.
- Sandamala Linkara, Ashin (1931). Rakhine Yazawinthit Kyan (in Burmese). Vol. 1–2 (1997 ed.). Yangon: Tetlan Sarpay.
