= Khin Tan =

Khin Tan ခင်သန်း

Queen of the Central Palace
- Tenure: 1084–1112?
- Predecessor: vacant
- Successor: Ti Lawka Sanda Dewi
- Born: c. 1060s? Htihlaing
- Died: Unknown; Pagan (Bagan)
- Spouse: Kyansittha
- House: Pagan
- Father: Chief of Htihlaing
- Religion: Theravada Buddhism

Khin Tan (Burmese: ခင်သန်း, pronounced [kʰɪ̀ɰ̃ tàɰ̃]; also spelled Hkindan) was one of the four chief queens of King Kyansittha of Pagan Dynasty of Burma (Myanmar). She was a daughter of the head man of Htihlaing.

== Bibliography ==
- Harvey, G. E. (1925). History of Burma: From the Earliest Times to 10 March 1824. London: Frank Cass & Co. Ltd.

Khin Tan Pagan Kingdom Born: c. 1060s Died: ?
Royal titles
Preceded by Vacant	Queen of the Central Palace; 1084–1112?	Succeeded by Ti Lawka Sanda Dewi
