= Yazakumari of Pagan =

Yazakumari ရာဇကုမ္မာရီ

Queen of the Western Palace
- Tenure: 1112 – ?
- Successor: Saw Ahlwan
- Born: c. 1090s
- Spouse: Sithu I
- Issue: none
- House: Pagan
- Religion: Theravada Buddhism

Yazakumari (Burmese: ရာဇကုမ္မာရီ, pronounced [jàza̰ kòʊɴmàɹì]; Pali: Rājakumāri) was a queen consort of King Sithu I of the Pagan Dynasty of Myanmar (Burma). She had no children. Queen Ti Lawka Sanda Dewi was her elder sister.

== Bibliography ==
- Maha Sithu (2012) [1798]. Kyaw Win; Thein Hlaing (eds.). Yazawin Thit (in Burmese). Vol. 1–3 (2nd ed.). Yangon: Ya-Pyei Publishing.
- Royal Historical Commission of Burma (1832). Hmannan Yazawin (in Burmese). Vol. 1–3 (2003 ed.). Yangon: Ministry of Information, Myanmar.

Yazakumari of Pagan Pagan Kingdom
Royal titles
New title	Queen of the Northern Palace; 1112 – ?	Succeeded by Saw Ahlwan
