= Saw Ahlwan of Pagan =

Saw Ahlwan စောအလွှမ်း

Queen of the Central Palace
- Tenure: 1174 – c. 1190s
- Predecessor: Ti Lawka Sanda Dewi
- Successor: Wadanthika
- Born: c. 1140s Pagan (Bagan)
- Died: c. 1190s Pagan
- Spouse: Naratheinkha (c. 1160s–1174); Sithu II (1174–90s?)
- Issue: Thatti-Kami
- House: Pagan
- Father: Yazathu
- Mother: Eindawthe
- Religion: Theravada Buddhism

Saw Ahlwan (Burmese: စောအလွှမ်း, pronounced [sɔ́ ʔə l̥wáɴ]; also known as Ale Pyinthe ("Queen of the Central Palace")) was a queen consort of kings Naratheinkha and Sithu II of the Pagan Dynasty of Myanmar (Burma).

The queen was the elder of the two daughters of Yazathu and Eindawthe, niece of queens Taung Pyinthe and Khin U. Chronicles simply refer to her as Ale Pyinthe ("Queen of the Central Palace") but according to an inscription from Sithu II's reign, her title or personal name appears to be Saw Ahlwan (or Saw Hteikhta (စောထိပ်ထား) in modern Burmese). She had a daughter named Thatti-Kami with Sithu II. She died during the reign of Sithu II (after the death of Queen Weluwaddy in 1186), and was succeeded by another queen as the Queen of the Central Palace.

== Bibliography ==
- Kala, U (1724). Maha Yazawin (in Burmese). Vol. 1–3 (2006, 4th printing ed.). Yangon: Ya-Pyei Publishing.
- Maha Sithu (2012) [1798]. Kyaw Win; Thein Hlaing (eds.). Yazawin Thit (in Burmese). Vol. 1–3 (2nd ed.). Yangon: Ya-Pyei Publishing.
- Royal Historical Commission of Burma (1832). Hmannan Yazawin (in Burmese). Vol. 1–3 (2003 ed.). Yangon: Ministry of Information, Myanmar.
- Than Tun (1964). Studies in Burmese History (in Burmese). Vol. 1. Yangon: Maha Dagon.

Saw Ahlwan of Pagan Pagan Kingdom
Royal titles
Preceded by Ti Lawka Sanda Dewi	Queen of the Central Palace; 1171 – c. 1190s	Succeeded by Wadanthika
