= List of Burmese leaders =

This is a list of rulers and office-holders in the history of Myanmar.

== Heads of state ==
- Monarchs

- Early and legendary monarchs
- Arakanese monarchs

- Prime ministers
- Presidents

== Deputy heads of state ==
- Heirs apparent/presumptive
- Vice presidents

== Heads of tributary states ==
- Rulers of Ava
- Rulers of Martaban
- Rulers of Pegu
- Rulers of Prome
- Rulers of Toungoo

== Colonial governors ==
- Colonial governors (British and Japanese)

== See also ==
- List of Burmese consorts
