= Shwegugyi Temple =

Theravadin Buddhist temple and UNESCO world heritage site monument in Bagan, Myanmar

- ရွှေဂူကြီး ဘုရား
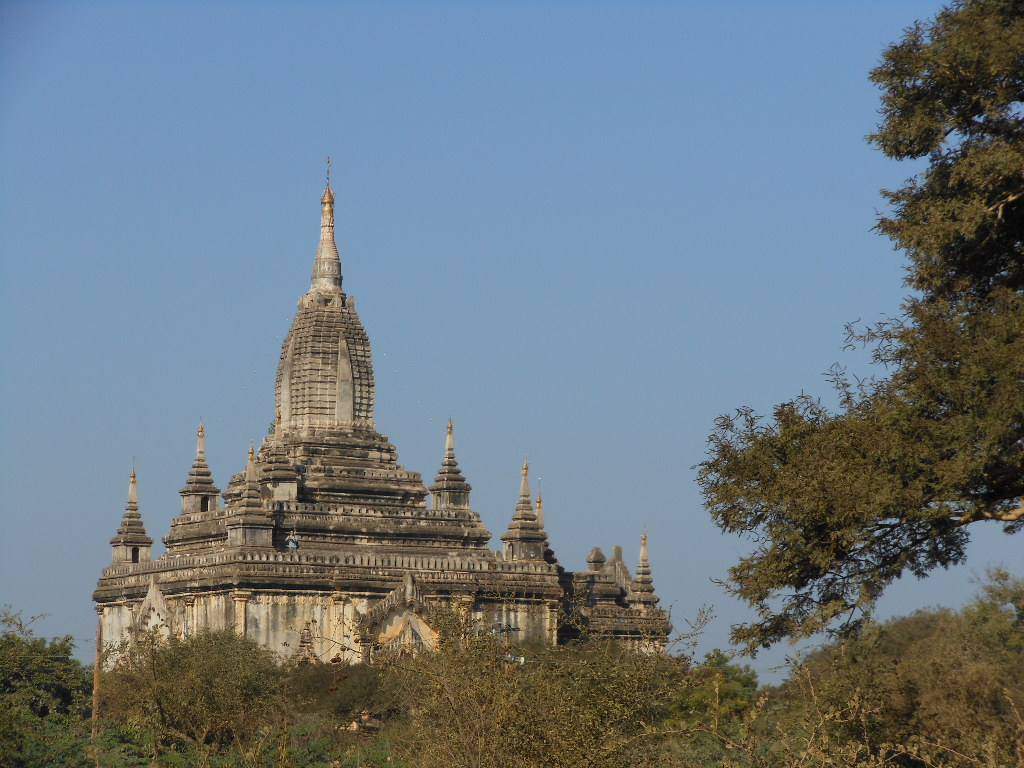

- Location within Myanmar

Religion
- Affiliation: Buddhism
- Sect: Theravada

Location
- Location: Bagan
- Country: Myanmar
- Coordinates: 21.1707443°N 94.8624056°E

Architecture
- Founder: King Sithu I
- Groundbreaking: 17 May 1331
- Completed: 17 December 1331; 694 years ago

The Shwegugyi Temple (Burmese: ရွှေဂူကြီး ဘုရား, pronounced [ʃwèɡùdʑí pʰəjá]; literally, "Great Golden Cave") is a Theravadin Buddhist temple in Bagan, Myanmar. The temple is recognized as Monument #1589 in the Bagan Archeological Area, a UNESCO World Heritage Site.

Located just to the southeast of what apparently were the ruins of the former royal palace founded by King Kyansittha (r. 1084–1113), the temple was built by King Sithu I of Pagan (Bagan) in 1131. According to the stone inscriptions at the temple, set up in 1141, construction work on the temple began on 17 May 1331, and was completed on 17 December 1331. Built on an expansive 3 m (9.8 ft) tall brick foundation, the temple is known for its arched windows, and fine stucco and carved wooden doors in the interior.

== Gallery ==
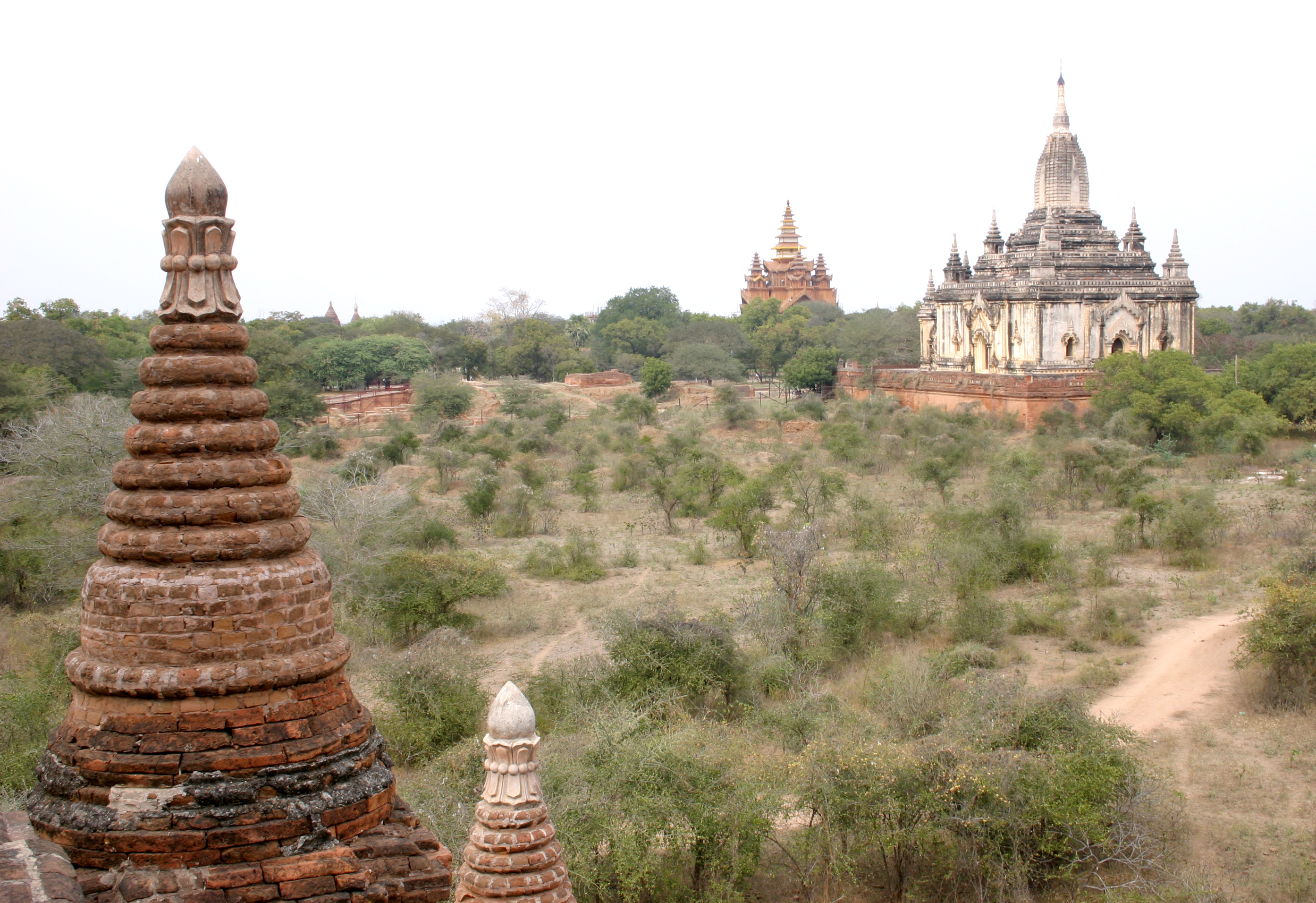

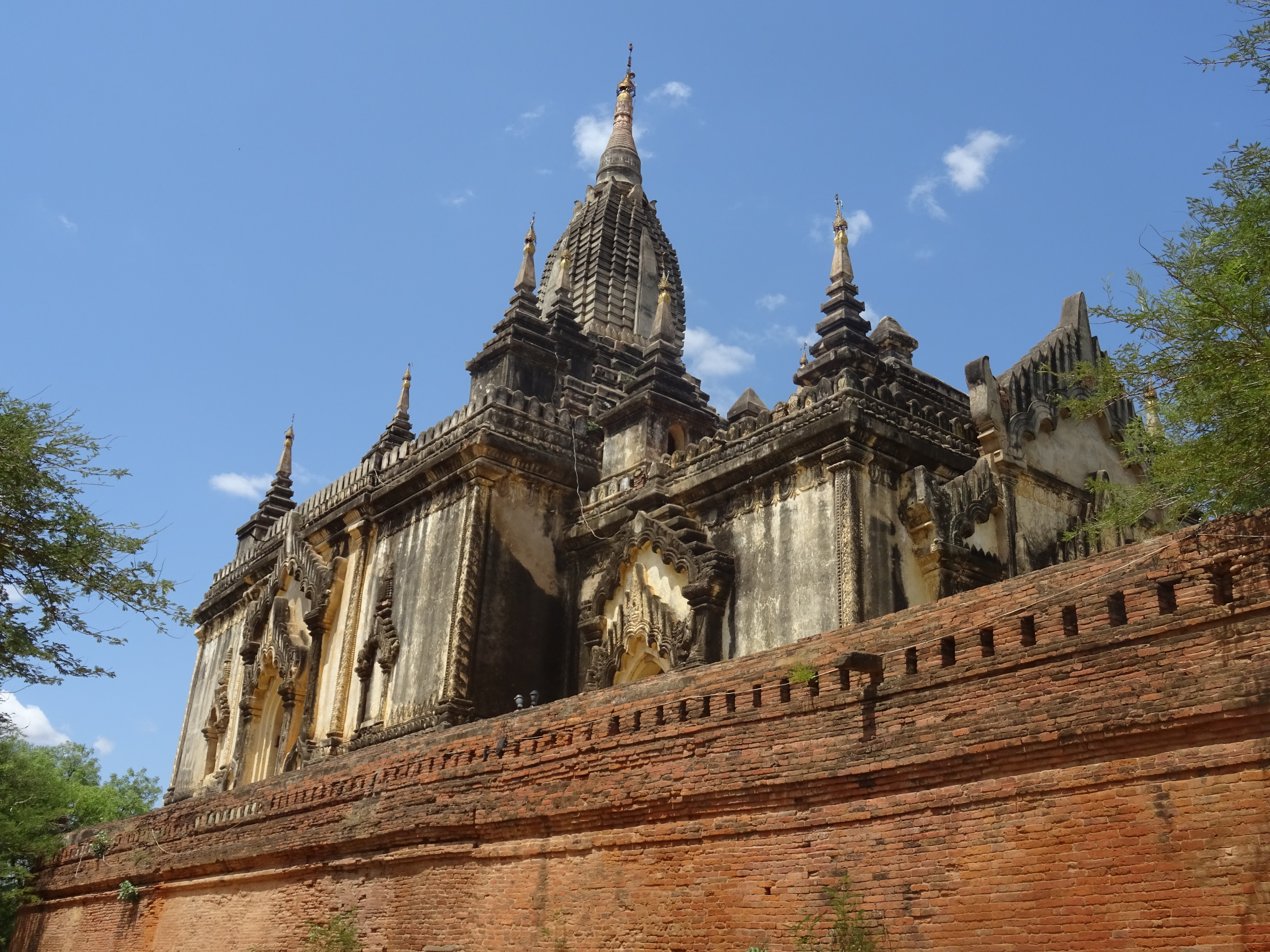

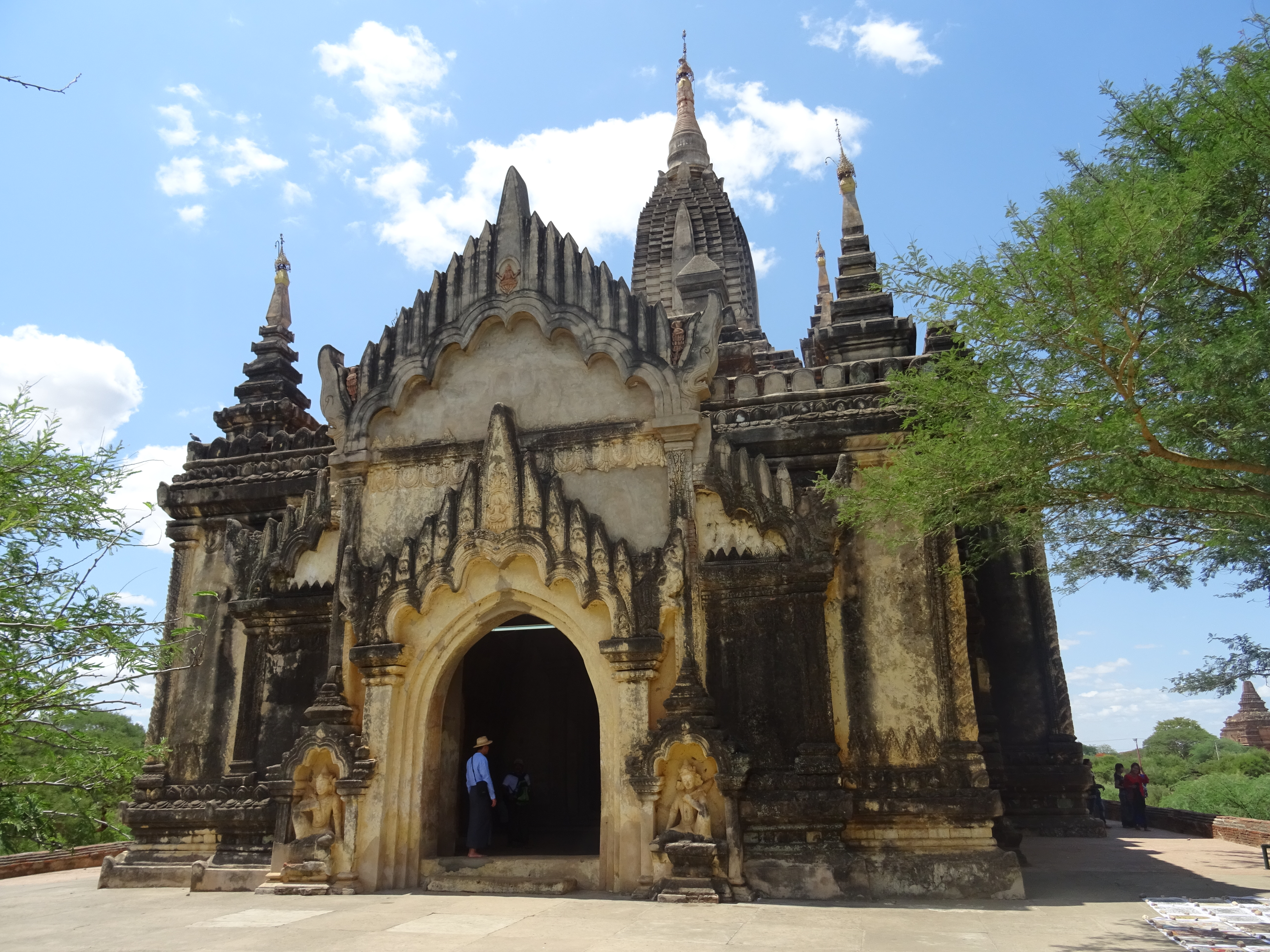

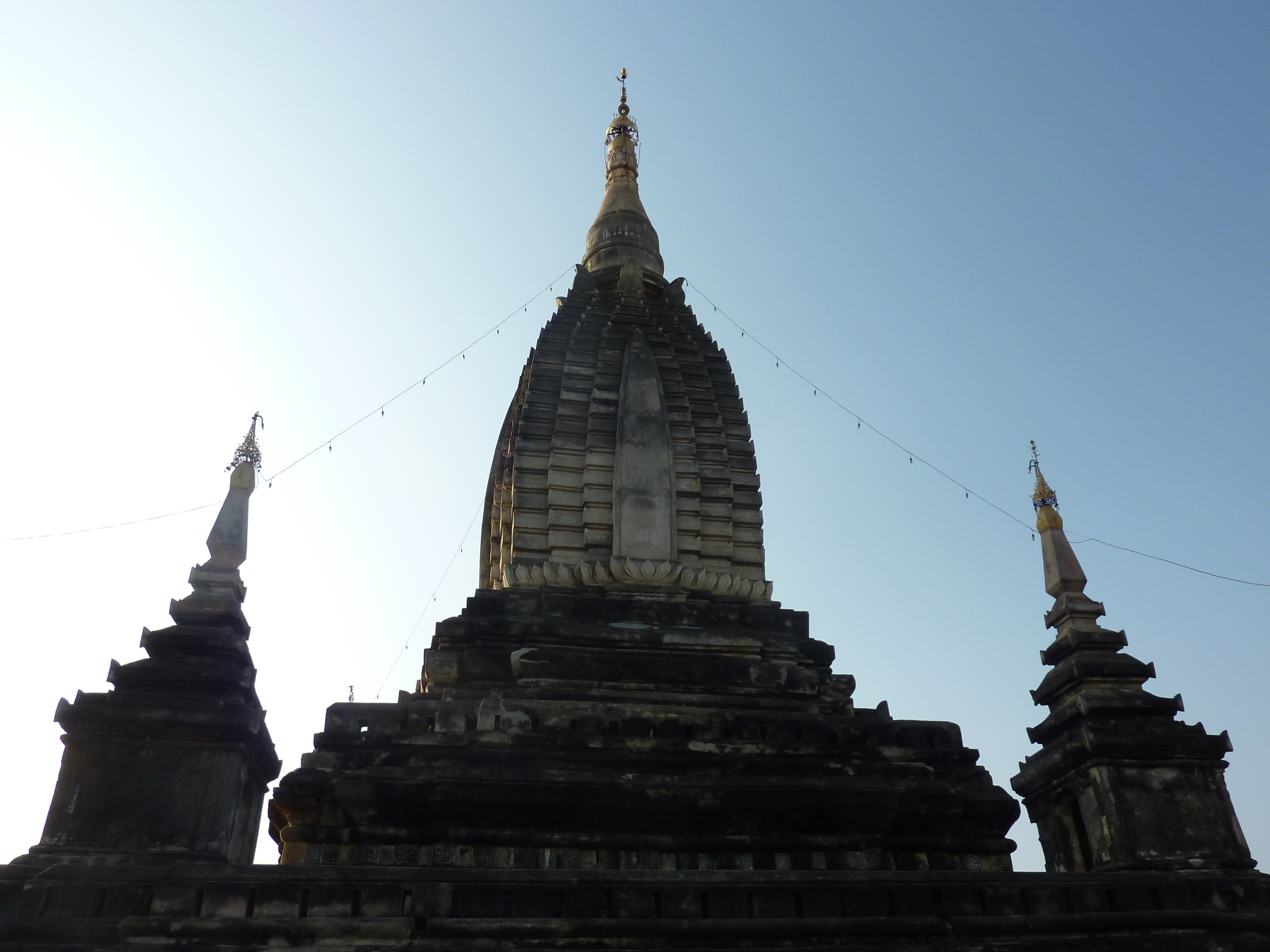
Sikhara tower

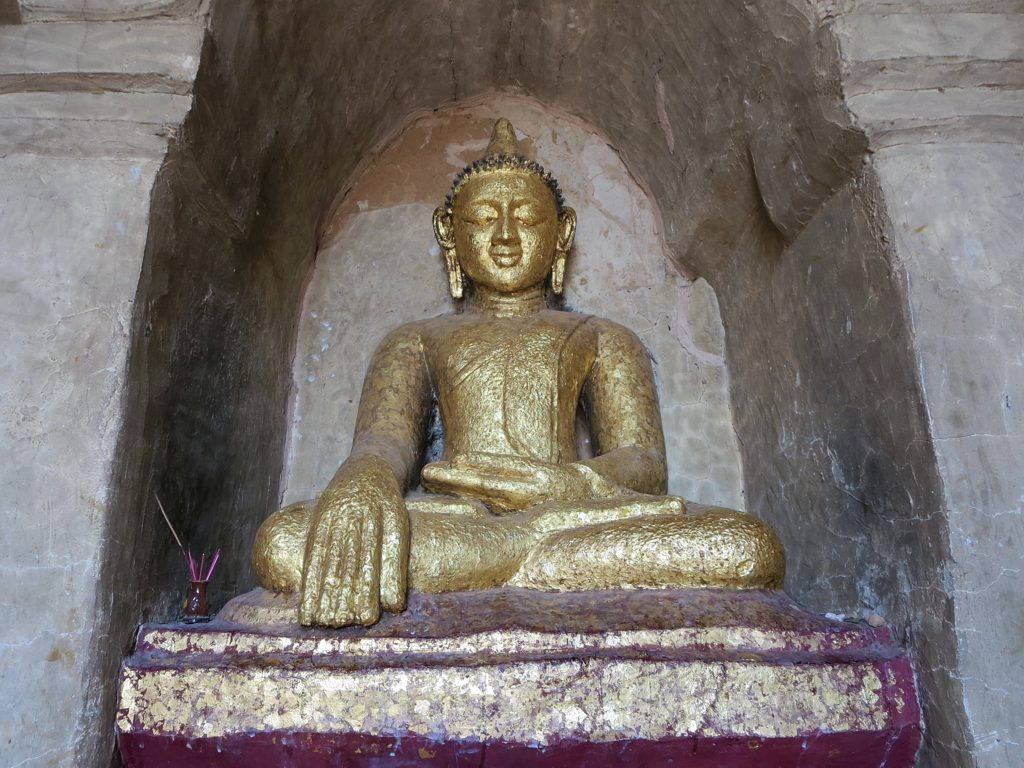

== Bibliography ==
- Coedès, George (1968). Walter F. Vella (ed.). The Indianized States of Southeast Asia. trans.Susan Brown Cowing. University of Hawaii Press. ISBN 978-0-8248-0368-1.
- Dutton, George (2014). Voices of Southeast Asia: Essential Readings from Antiquity to the Present. Taylor & Francis. ISBN 9781317452447.
- Fiala, Robert D. (2002). "Shwegugyi Temple, Bagan, Myanmar". Oriental Architecture.
- Kala, U (2006) [1724]. Maha Yazawin (in Burmese). Vol. 1–3 (4th printing ed.). Yangon: Ya-Pyei Publishing.
- Pictorial Guide to Pagan. Rangoon: Ministry of Culture. 1975 [1955].
