= Saw Mya Kan of Pagan =

Saw Mya Kan စောမြကန်

Queen of the Central Palace
- Tenure: c. 1190s – 1211
- Predecessor: Wadanthika
- Successor: Saw Mi Pyan
- Died: Pagan
- Spouse: Sithu II
- Issue: Htilominlo; Saw Min Hla
- House: Pagan
- Religion: Theravada Buddhism

Saw Mya Kan (Burmese: စောမြကန်}, pronounced [sɔ́ mja̰ gàɴ]) was a principal queen of King Sithu II of the Pagan Dynasty of Myanmar (Burma). She was the mother of King Htilominlo.

Chronicles say that Htilominlo's mother was a daughter of a gardener, and not Queen Mya Kan. But inscriptional evidence shows that Queen Mya Kan was the mother of Zeya Theinkha (personal name of Htilominlo) and Saw Min Hla.

== Bibliography ==
- Kala, U (1724). Maha Yazawin (in Burmese). Vol. 1–3 (2006, 4th printing ed.). Yangon: Ya-Pyei Publishing.
- Maha Sithu (2012) [1798]. Kyaw Win; Thein Hlaing (eds.). Yazawin Thit (in Burmese). Vol. 1–3 (2nd ed.). Yangon: Ya-Pyei Publishing.
- Royal Historical Commission of Burma (1832). Hmannan Yazawin (in Burmese). Vol. 1–3 (2003 ed.). Yangon: Ministry of Information, Myanmar.
- Than Tun (1964). Studies in Burmese History (in Burmese). Vol. 1. Yangon: Maha Dagon.

Saw Mya Kan of Pagan Pagan Kingdom
Royal titles
Preceded by Wadanthika	Queen of the Central Palace c. 1190s – 1211	Succeeded by Saw Mi Pyan
