= Myauk Pyinthe =

Myauk Pyinthe was a Pagan era Burmese royal title that means "Queen of the Northern Palace". The following queens of the era were simply reported in the chronicles as Myauk Pyinthe without any other distinguishing titles or personal names.

- Myauk Pyinthe (Kunhsaw): Queen of the Northern Palace of Pagan (?–1014, 1044), Chief queen (1014–21)
- Myauk Pyinthe (Narathu): Queen of the Northern Palace of Burma (1167–71)
- Myauk Pyinthe II (Sithu II): Queen of the Northern Palace of Burma (1190s–1211)
- Myauk Pyinthe (Htilominlo): Queen of the Northern Palace of Burma (1211–31?)
