= Sanda Wizaya =

Sanda Wizaya စန္ဒာဝိဇရမင်း

King of Arakan
- Reign: November 1710 – April 1731
- Coronation: November 1710
- Predecessor: Sanda Thuriya II
- Successor: Sanda Thuriya III
- Born: 1665; Hkrit
- Died: April 1731 (aged 66); Mrauk U
- Consort: Shwe Ku (ရွှေကူ)
- Issue: Hmauk Taw Ma II and others
Names
- Thaungnyo Sanda Wizaya Mingyi ဒုံးညို စန္ဒာ ဝီဇယ တန္တဗိုလ်မင်းကြီး
- House: Wizaya
- Father: Uggabala
- Religion: Therevada Buddhism

Sanda Wizaya (Rakhine: စန္ဒာဝီဇရ; 1665 – April 1731), commonly known as Thaungnyo, was the 35th king of the Mrauk U Dynasty of Arakan from 1710 to 1731. His reign re-established Arakan's military might for some time, raiding in the east against Mindon and Prome and in the west against Bengal. His naval fleet later sunk near Kyaukpandu upon arrival from Chittagong. He was assassinated in 1731 and succeeded by his son-in-law.

== Early life ==
The future king Sanda Wizaya was born in the old city of Hkrit, called Hkrit Creek or Khrit Chaung (ခြိတ်ချောင်း), in present-day Minbya Township. His birth name was Thaungyo (တုံးညို) and he was sometimes known as Tantabo Min (တန္တဗိုလ်မင်း). He was active in the service of King Sanda Wimala I. He later defeated the rebels, pursuing them across the Lemro Valley.

Following the death of King Sanda Thudhamma in 1684, the Kingdom of Mrauk U had been in a disturbed state and internal chaos crippled the nation. At the beginning of the 18th century, the mouth of the Lemro River and other places were seized by robber chiefs whose gangs devastated the country. Thaungnyo, a man of low origin but strong will, having more by good luck than anything else, defeated one of the gangs and gained control over the inhabitants of the capital.

== Reign ==
In 1710, he declared himself king and justified his authority by clearing the country of the daciots who infested it, forcibly exiling the Kamein, who had served as the king's palace guards after the Arakanese lost control of Chittagong in 1666. He repaired the Mahâmuni, Mahâti, and the walls of the city, and built himself a new palace. Sanda Wizaya repaired the city's defensive wall and moats, renovated many temples, and built new and lavish palaces.

Sanda Wizaya also launched a military campaign against the Mughals to retake Chittagong, which resulted in nominal control, after taking advantage of the disturbances of Mughal Emperor Jahandar Shah, who ravaged the lower part of Bengal with his armies.

King Sanda Wizaya was assassinated in 1731 and succeeded by his son-in-law, Sanda Thuriya III.

== Bibliography ==
- Harvey, G. E. (1925). History of Burma: From the Earliest Times to 10 March 1824. London: Frank Cass & Co. Ltd.
- Myat Soe, ed. (1964). Myanma Swezon Kyan (in Burmese). Vol. 9 (1 ed.). Yangon: Sarpay Beikman.
- Myint-U, Thant (2006). The River of Lost Footsteps—Histories of Burma. Farrar, Straus and Giroux. ISBN 978-0-374-16342-6.
- Sandamala Linkara, Ashin (1931). Rakhine Yazawinthit Kyan (in Burmese). Vol. 1–2 (1997 ed.). Yangon: Tetlan Sarpay.
