= Kalamandat =

Kalamandat ကာလဂန္တတ်

King of Arakan
- Reign: 16 May 1697 - 5 June 1698
- Predecessor: Mayuppiya
- Successor: Naradipati
- Born: 1637; Mrauk-U
- Died: 5 June 1698 (aged 61); Mrauk-U
- Consort: Phwar-May (ဖွားမယ်)
- Religion: Therevada Buddhism

Kalamandat (Burmese: ကာလဗန္ဒလ, my, Arakanese pronunciation: my;) was a king of the Mrauk-U Dynasty of Arakan, a former state in Myanmar (Burma). He was originally a monk.

== Bibliography ==
- Harvey, G. E. (1925). History of Burma: From the Earliest Times to 10 March 1824. London: Frank Cass & Co. Ltd.
- Myat Soe, ed. (1964). Myanma Swezon Kyan (in Burmese). Vol. 9 (1 ed.). Yangon: Sarpay Beikman.
- Myint-U, Thant (2006). The River of Lost Footsteps—Histories of Burma. Farrar, Straus and Giroux. ISBN 978-0-374-16342-6.
- Sandamala Linkara, Ashin (1931). Rakhine Yazawinthit Kyan (in Burmese). Vol. 1–2 (1997 ed.). Yangon: Tetlan Sarpay.
