= Sanda Thuriya II =

Sanda Thuriya II စန္ဒာ သူရိယရာဇာ

King of Arakan
- Reign: 3 April 1707 - September 1710
- Predecessor: Sanda Wimala I
- Successor: Sanda Wizaya
- Born: 1660 CE; Mrauk-U
- Died: 1710 CE (aged 50); Mrauk U
- Consort: Phwar Thway (ဖွားသွေး)
- House: Narapatigyi
- Father: Re-baw Thiha
- Religion: Therevada Buddhism

Sanda Thuriya II (Rakhine:စန္ဒာသူရိယ, 1660 - September 1710) whose personal name was Thado Hla (သတိုးလှ), was a 34th king of the Mrauk-U Dynasty of Arakan. During his reign, king of Ava tried to annex Sandoway, was successfully fend off by the governor of Sandoway, to whom sent plenty of war booties to the king.

== Bibliography ==
- Harvey, G. E. (1925). History of Burma: From the Earliest Times to 10 March 1824. London: Frank Cass & Co. Ltd.
- Myat Soe, ed. (1964). Myanma Swezon Kyan (in Burmese). Vol. 9 (1 ed.). Yangon: Sarpay Beikman.
- Myint-U, Thant (2006). The River of Lost Footsteps—Histories of Burma. Farrar, Straus and Giroux. ISBN 978-0-374-16342-6.
- Sandamala Linkara, Ashin (1931). Rakhine Yazawinthit Kyan (in Burmese). Vol. 1–2 (1997 ed.). Yangon: Tetlan Sarpay.
