= Sanda Thuriya I =

Sanda Dhamma Thuriya I စန္ဒာသူရိယမ္မရာဇာ

King of Arakan
- Reign: 20 December 1694 - 4 August 1696
- Predecessor: Muni Thudhammaraza
- Successor: Nawrahta of Mrauk-U
- Born: 1672; Sandoway
- Died: 4 August 1696 (aged 24); Mrauk-U
- Consort: Thubarabin
- Issue: Nawrahta of Mrauk-U
- House: Narapatigyi
- Father: Uggabala
- Religion: Therevada Buddhism

Sanda Thuriya I (Rakhine:စန္ဒာသူရိယရာဇာ, 1672 - 4 August 1696) whose personal name was Thado Aung Kyaw (သတိုးအောင်ကျော်), was a 28th king of the Mrauk-U Dynasty of Arakan. Who was originally a governor of Sandoway served under during his brother's reign. The royal court enthroned him after subsequent dethroning of kings.

He was killed by his close bodyguards after quelling the rebellion near the Kaladan River. His premature son succeeded him only to reigned for 15 days.

== Bibliography ==
- Harvey, G. E. (1925). History of Burma: From the Earliest Times to 10 March 1824. London: Frank Cass & Co. Ltd.
- Myat Soe, ed. (1964). Myanma Swezon Kyan (in Burmese). Vol. 9 (1 ed.). Yangon: Sarpay Beikman.
- Myint-U, Thant (2006). The River of Lost Footsteps—Histories of Burma. Farrar, Straus and Giroux. ISBN 978-0-374-16342-6.
- Sandamala Linkara, Ashin (1931). Rakhine Yazawinthit Kyan (in Burmese). Vol. 1–2 (1997 ed.). Yangon: Tetlan Sarpay.
