= Taung Pyinthe (Narathu) =

Taung Pyinthe တောင်ပြင်သည်

Chief Queen Consort of Burma
- Tenure: 1167 – 1171
- Predecessor: Ti Lawka Sanda Dewi
- Successor: Min Aung Myat
- Spouse: Narathu
- House: Pagan
- Religion: Theravada Buddhism

Taung Pyinthe (Burmese: တောင်ပြင်သည်, pronounced [tàʊɴ bjìɴ ðɛ̀]; lit. "Queen of the Southern Palace") was the chief queen consort of King Narathu of the Pagan Dynasty of Myanmar (Burma).

Her existence is inferred. None of the main chronicles has a record of the names of the queens of Narathu. The Yazawin Thit chronicle explicitly says no records of Narathu's queens could be found. Yazawin Thit and Hmannan Yazawin mention only that Naratheinkha and Sithu II had the same mother. Per Than Tun, their mother was the North Queen, which implies the existence of a South Queen.

== Bibliography ==
- Royal Historical Commission of Burma (1832). Hmannan Yazawin (in Burmese). Vol. 1–3 (2003 ed.). Yangon: Ministry of Information, Myanmar.

Taung Pyinthe (Narathu) Pagan Kingdom
Royal titles
| Preceded by Ti Lawka Sanda Dewi | Chief Queen Consort of Burma; 1167 – 1171 | Succeeded by Min Aung Myat |
