= Wara Dhammaraza =

Wara Dhammaraza ဝရဓမ္မရာဇာ

King of Arakan
- Reign: 1685 – 1692
- Coronation: April 20, 1685
- Predecessor: Thiri Thuriya
- Successor: Muni Thudhammaraza
- Consort: Thukumariya
- House: Narapatigyi
- Father: Sanda Thudhamma
- Mother: Yadanar Piya
- Religion: Therevada Buddhism

Wara Dhammaraza (Arakanese:ဝရ ဓမ္မာရာဇာ) was a 26th king of Mrauk-U Dynasty of Arakan.

The king renovated and restored the Zayrama Pagoda in Mrauk U.

== Reign ==
His reign took place during a period of severe political instability and he was largely a puppet controlled by the palace guards.

He attempted to regain authority by recruiting Buddhist monks from Mrauk U to support him, but this effort failed. Following this, the palace guards began persecuting monks throughout the kingdom. Economically, Arakan was already weakened due to the earlier loss of Chittagong and the extensive donations previous kings had made to religious institutions, which had drained royal resources.

== Dethrone and aftermath ==
The king was ultimately dethroned by the palace guards in 1692, without having exercised real power at any point during his reign. After his fall, a series of six puppet kings followed and Arakan continued to disintegrate amid civil war and famine.

== Bibliography ==
- Harvey, G. E. (1925). History of Burma: From the Earliest Times to 10 March 1824. London: Frank Cass & Co. Ltd.
- Myat Soe, ed. (1964). Myanma Swezon Kyan (in Burmese). Vol. 9 (1 ed.). Yangon: Sarpay Beikman.
- Myint-U, Thant (2006). The River of Lost Footsteps—Histories of Burma. Farrar, Straus and Giroux. ISBN 978-0-374-16342-6.
- Sandamala Linkara, Ashin (1931). Rakhine Yazawinthit Kyan (in Burmese). Vol. 1–2 (1997 ed.). Yangon: Tetlan Sarpay.
