= Naradipati =

Naradipati နရဓိပတိ

King of Arakan
- Reign: 5 June 1698 - 17 June 1700
- Predecessor: Kalamandat
- Successor: Sanda Wimala I
- Born: 1676/77
- Died: 17 June 1700 (aged 23); Mrauk-U
- Consort: Nan Htet-Miphya (နန်းထက်မိဖုရား)
Names
- Shwesar Naradipati Raza
- House: Narapatigyi
- Religion: Therevada Buddhism

Naradipati (Arakanese:နရဓိပတိ, 1676 - 17 June 1700) whose personal name was Maung Phyu (မောင်ဖြူ), was a 33rd king of the Mrauk-U Dynasty of Arakan.

== Bibliography ==
- Harvey, G. E. (1925). History of Burma: From the Earliest Times to 10 March 1824. London: Frank Cass & Co. Ltd.
- Myat Soe, ed. (1964). Myanma Swezon Kyan (in Burmese). Vol. 9 (1 ed.). Yangon: Sarpay Beikman.
- Myint-U, Thant (2006). The River of Lost Footsteps—Histories of Burma. Farrar, Straus and Giroux. ISBN 978-0-374-16342-6.
- Sandamala Linkara, Ashin (1931). Rakhine Yazawinthit Kyan (in Burmese). Vol. 1–2 (1997 ed.). Yangon: Tetlan Sarpay.
