= Nawrahta of Mrauk-U =

Nawrahta of Mrauk-U ငတုံနော်ရတာ

King of Arakan
- Reign: 4 August 1696 – 18 August 1696
- Predecessor: Sanda Thuriya I
- Successor: Mayuppiya
- Born: 1682 CE; Mrauk-U
- Died: 18 August 1696 (aged 14); Mrauk-U
- Consort: Thukhuma
- House: Narapatigyi
- Father: Sanda Thuriya I
- Religion: Therevada Buddhism

Nawrahta of Mrauk-U (Rakhine: ငတုံနော်ရတာ, also known as Noratha) was a king of the Mrauk-U Dynasty of Arakan. He was a child king who briefly reigned for a few days in 1696.

== Bibliography ==
- Harvey, G. E. (1925). History of Burma: From the Earliest Times to 10 March 1824. London: Frank Cass & Co. Ltd.
- Myat Soe, ed. (1964). Myanma Swezon Kyan (in Burmese). Vol. 9 (1 ed.). Yangon: Sarpay Beikman.
- Myint-U, Thant (2006). The River of Lost Footsteps—Histories of Burma. Farrar, Straus and Giroux. ISBN 978-0-374-16342-6.
- Sandamala Linkara, Ashin (1931). Rakhine Yazawinthit Kyan (in Burmese). Vol. 1–2 (1997 ed.). Yangon: Tetlan Sarpay.
