= Ti Lawka Sanda Dewi =

Ti Lawka Sanda Dewi တိလောက စန္ဒာဒေဝီ

Chief queen consort of Burma
- Tenure: c. 1150s – 1167
- Predecessor: Yadanabon I
- Successor: Taung Pyinthe (Narathu)

Queen of the Central Palace
- Tenure: 1112–1150s
- Predecessor: Khin Tan
- Successor: Saw Ahlwan
- Spouse: Sithu I
- Issue: Htauk Hlayga
- House: Pagan
- Religion: Theravada Buddhism

Ti Lawka Sanda Dewi (Burmese: တိလောက စန္ဒာဒေဝီ, pronounced [tḭlɔ́ka̰ sàɴdà déwì]; Pali: Tilokacandādevī) was a chief queen consort of King Sithu I of Pagan (Bagan). She was a senior queen until c. 1150s when she succeeded Queen Yadanabon as the chief queen (usaukpan). Sanda Dewi had a son named Htauk Hlayga. Her younger sister was also a queen of Sithu with the title of Yazakumari.

== Bibliography ==
- Maha Sithu (2012) [1798]. Kyaw Win; Thein Hlaing (eds.). Yazawin Thit (in Burmese). Vol. 1–3 (2nd ed.). Yangon: Ya-Pyei Publishing.

Ti Lawka Sanda Dewi Pagan Kingdom
Royal titles
Preceded by Yadanabon I	Chief queen consort of Burma; 1150s–1167	Succeeded by Taung Pyinthe (Narathu)
Preceded by Khin Tan	Queen of the Central Palace; 1112–1050s	Succeeded by Saw Ahlwan
