= Sanda Thudhamma =

King of Arakan from 1652 to 1684

Sanda Thudhamma Raza စန္ဒသုဓမ္မရာဇာ
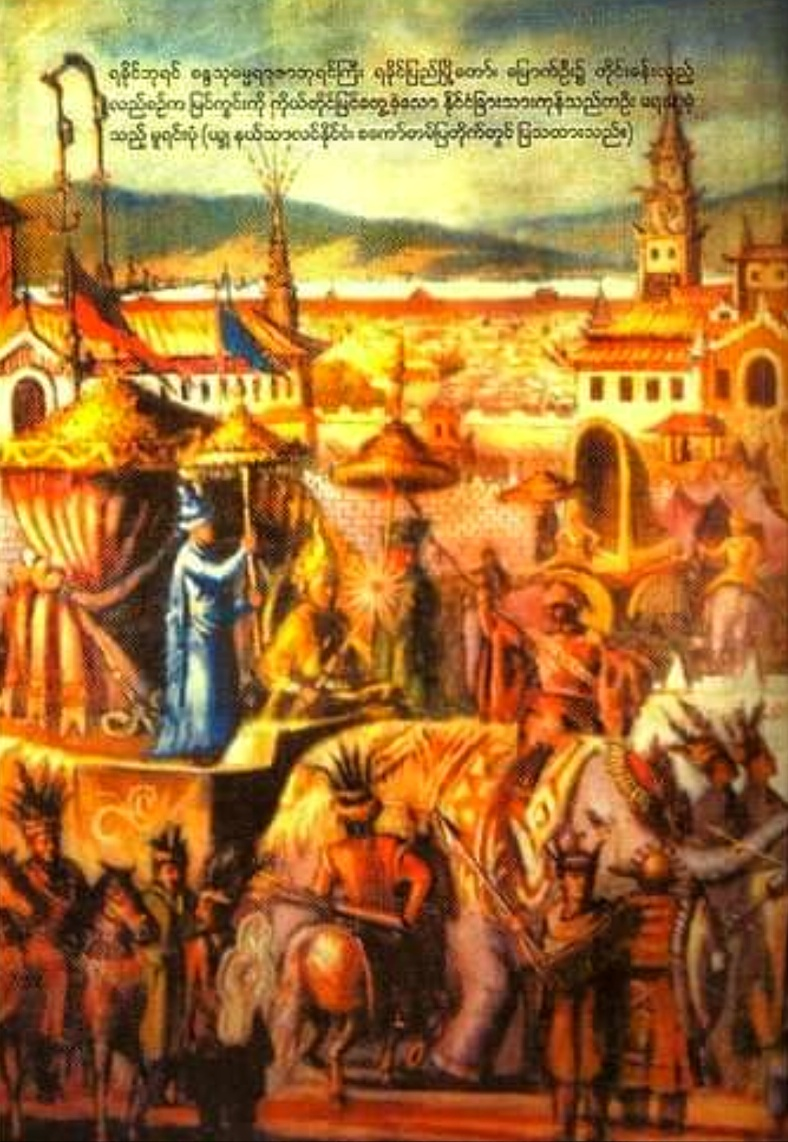
- Going around the Palace of Arakanese King Sanda Thudhamma Raza in Mrauk-U, AD 1664

King of Arakan
- Reign: c. May 1652 - 20 December 1684
- Predecessor: Thado of Mrauk-U
- Successor: Uggabala
- Born: c. February 1637 Tabaung 983 ME; Mrauk U
- Died: 20 December 1684 (aged 47) Wednesday, 3rd waxing of Pyatho 1030 ME; Mrauk U
- Consort: Radanar-Piya
- Issue: Uggabala; Wara Dhammaraza; Thuwanna Kalya
Names
- Shwenanthakhin Sanda Thudhamma Raza ရွှေနန်းသခင် စန္ဒသုဓမ္မရာဇာ
- House: Narapatigyi
- Father: Thado of Mrauk-U
- Mother: Radanar Kounmari
- Religion: Theravada Buddhism

Sanda Thudhamma Raza (Arakanese: စန္ဒသုဓမ္မရာဇာ, February 1637 - 20 December 1684) was 24th king of the Mrauk U Kingdom. He reigned from 1652 to 1674. He lost the control of Chittagong during his reign and the Dutch VOC left in 1664 following their trade agreement in 1653. Due to the loss of Chittagong, the kingdom began to declined and isolated after his death in 1684.

The king built and constructed five prominent pagodas of Mrauk-U which still stood today. After his death in 1684, the kingdom fell into dismantled state which internal struggles of the royal court and subsequents overthrowing of kings became common for the next 100 years till the end of the monarchy came in 1784.

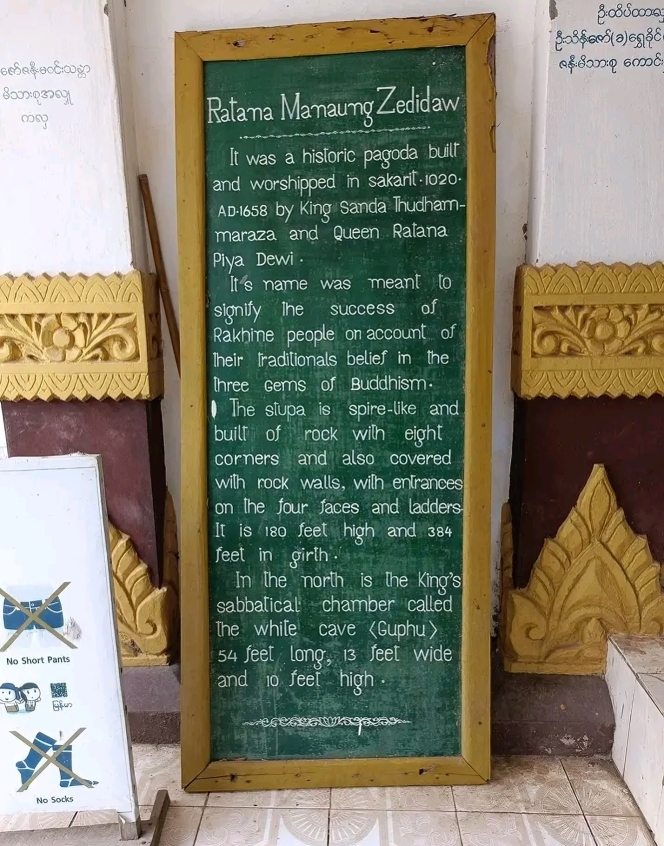
Inscription on the Ratana Manaung Zedidaw Pagoda built by Sanda and his wife

The famous Bengali poet Syed Alaol was the poet in his court. He translated Tohfa at the request of Shrichondro Sudhormo or Sanda Thudhamma.

== Reign ==
At only the age of 13, King Sanda took the throne after death of his father, Thado in 1652, beginning a reign that would span over three decades.

He built several significant pagodas in Mrauk U, including Zinamanaung, Thekyamanaung, Ratanamanaung, Shwekyathein, and Lokamu.

During his reign, Buddhist exchanges with Ceylon continued. In his final year, around forty Arakanese monks traveled to Ceylon at the request of a mission supported by the Dutch. The Dutch, aiming to counter Portuguese Catholic influence in Ceylon, sought to revive the upasampada ordination, which was declining. They turned to Arakan because they had maintained a trading post near Mrauk U from 1626 to 1683, though it was occasionally closed due to other obligations. In 1670, the entire Dutch staff there was massacred. However, while it lasted, the Dutch found the Sanda more cooperative than the Burmese king. Under a 1653 agreement, Sanda allowed them certain privileges, such as appointing their own interpreter and taking their children born to local women.

In 1664, Sanda Thudamma had to cede large amounts of his territories due to an invasion by Mughal Emperor Aurangzeb. In 1666, another invasion by Shaista Khan captured the port of Chittagong. Chittagong remained a key port throughout Mughal rule.

== See also ==
- Mrauk U Kingdom
- History of Rakhine

== Bibliography ==
- Harvey, G. E. (1925). History of Burma: From the Earliest Times to 10 March 1824. London: Frank Cass & Co. Ltd.
- Myat Soe, ed. (1964). Myanma Swezon Kyan (in Burmese). Vol. 9 (1 ed.). Yangon: Sarpay Beikman.
- Myint-U, Thant (2006). The River of Lost Footsteps—Histories of Burma. Farrar, Straus and Giroux. ISBN 978-0-374-16342-6.
- Sandamala Linkara, Ashin (1931). Rakhine Yazawinthit Kyan (in Burmese). Vol. 1–2 (1997 ed.). Yangon: Tetlan Sarpay.
