= Alaungsithu =

Alaungsithu အလောင်းစည်သူ
- King Sithu I of Pagan
- Alaungsithu's statute in Mandalay Palace

King of Burma
- Reign: 1112/13 – 1167
- Predecessor: Kyansittha
- Successor: Min Shin Saw (Consecrated); Narathu
- Chief Minister: Aleimma
- Born: 17 January 1090; Thursday, full moon of Tabodwe 451 ME; Pagan
- Died: 1167 (aged 77); 529 ME; Pagan
- Consort: Yadanabon; Ti Lawka Sanda Dewi; Yazakumari; Taung Pyinthe
- Issue: Min Shin Saw; Narathu; Htauk Hlayga; Taung Phya; Shwe Kyu; Chit Oo; Kyaungdaw
Names
- Jeyyasūra Caññsū I
Regnal name
- Śri Tri-bhuvanādityā pavarapaṇḍita sudhammarājā mahādhipati Caññsū
- House: Pagan
- Father: Saw Yun
- Mother: Shwe Einthi
- Religion: Theravada Buddhism

Alaungsithu or Sithu I (Burmese: အလောင်းစည်သူ [ʔəláʊɰ̃ sìðù]; also Caññsū I; 1090–1167) was king of the Pagan Dynasty of Burma (Myanmar) from 1112/13 to 1167. Sithu's reign was a prosperous one in which Pagan was an integral part of inland and maritime trading networks. Sithu engaged in a massive building campaign throughout the kingdom, which included colonies, forts and outposts at strategic locations to strengthen the frontiers, ordination halls and pagodas for the support of religion, as well as reservoirs, dams and other land improvements to assist the farmers. He also introduced standardized weights and measures throughout the country to assist administration as well as trade. He presided over the beginning of a transition away from the Mon culture toward the expression of a distinctive Burman style.

Sithu is remembered as a peripatetic king who traveled extensively throughout his realm, built monuments and nurtured Theravada Buddhism with acts of piety.

== Early life ==
Sithu was born Zeyathura Sithu (Burmese: ဇေယျသူရ စည်သူ, Pali: Jayyasura Cansu) to Saw Yun (son of King Saw Lu) and Shwe Einthi (daughter of King Kyansittha) on 17 January 1090. (According to Zatadawbon Yazawin, he was born on 13 December 1089. (Note: (Than Tun 1964: 124): According to the chronicles, Sithu I was born two years after Kyansittha's accession, but a contemporary inscription (inscribed in 1115 CE) says the king was born in 451 ME (1089/1090 CE). Zatadawbon Yazawin (Zata 1960: 65) says he was born on 8th day of 10th month of 455 ME. But 455 ME is a typo since the numbers 1 (၁) and 5 (၅) in Burmese are similar. It should be year 451 as corroborated by the inscription.)) The chronicles do not agree on the dates regarding his life and reign. The table below lists the dates given by the four main chronicles.

Chronicles	Birth–Death	Age	Reign	Length of reign
Zatadawbon Yazawin	1093–1167	73	1111–1167	56
Maha Yazawin	1074–1158	84	1088–1158	70
Yazawin Thit	1079–1168	89	1093–1168	75
Hmannan Yazawin	1067–1167	100	1092–1167	75

At Sithu's birth, Kyansittha, who thought that he had no son, was so delighted that he crowned the infant as king, and presented the baby to the people saying "Behold your king! Henceforth, I reign only as his regent." It turned out that Kyansittha did have a son by a wife during one of his exiles in the 1070s. That son, Yazakumar, made no claim to the throne.

== Accession ==
Sithu faced no opposition to the throne after his grandfather, Kyansittha, died in 1112. He was the great-grandson of Anawrahta on his father's side. His coronation was presided by an aging Primate Shin Arahan who also presided the coronations of the two predecessor kings, and adviser to three previous kings. Upon ascending the throne, Sithu assumed the royal style Sri Tribhuwanaditya Pavarapandita Sudhammaraja Mahadhipati Narapatisithu.

== Reign ==
=== Administration ===
The early part of Sithu's reign was spent repressing revolts, especially in Tenasserim and north Arakan. A Pali inscription found at Mergui (Myeik) is evidence that Tenasserim then paid allegiance to the Pagan monarchy. In northern Arakan, a usurper called Kahtom (ကထုံ, chief of Thaks)) had driven out the rightful heir, who fled to Pagan, where he subsequently died. Pagan's initial attempt to restore the rightful heir Letya Min Nan—a combined land and seaborne invasion—failed but the second attempt in 1118 succeeded. (The Arakanese chronicles report the date as 1103.) Letya Min Nan, in gratitude, repaired the Buddhagaya shrine in the honor of his overlord Sithu.

Sithu traveled far and wide throughout his dominions, building many works of merit. These pious pilgrimages form the main theme of the chronicles of his reign. He reportedly sailed as far south as Malaya and Bengal in the west. Like his great-grandfather Anawrahta, he also traveled to Nanzhao Kingdom. There was apparently much disorder during his long absences from the capital.

The rulings given at his court, some of which by himself, once existed in a collection, the Alaungsithu Hpyatton.

=== Economy ===
Sithu's reign was a prosperous one in which Pagan was an integral part of in-land and maritime trading networks. Sithu engaged in a massive building campaign throughout the kingdom, which included colonies, forts and outposts at strategic locations to strengthen the frontiers, ordination halls and pagodas for the support of religion, as well as reservoirs, dams and other land improvements to assist the farmers. He also introduced standardized weights and measures throughout the country to assist administration as well as trade. The standardization provided an impetus for the monetization of Pagan's economy, the full impact of which however would not be felt until later in the 12th century.

In the 1150s, Sithu visited the court of Parakramabahu I in Sri Lanka appointing an ambassador. Burmese chronicles state that Sithu married a daughter of Parakramabahu. However, the Sri Lankan chronicle Cūḷavaṃsa records that Sithu caught sight of a letter addressed to the King of Cambodia and attempted to stop Sri Lanka's elephant trade with Cambodia. Instead of a diplomatic marriage, the chronicle states that Bagan captured a lesser Sinhalese princess, sent by Parakramabahu, on her way to Cambodia sparking a brief naval war.

=== Culture ===
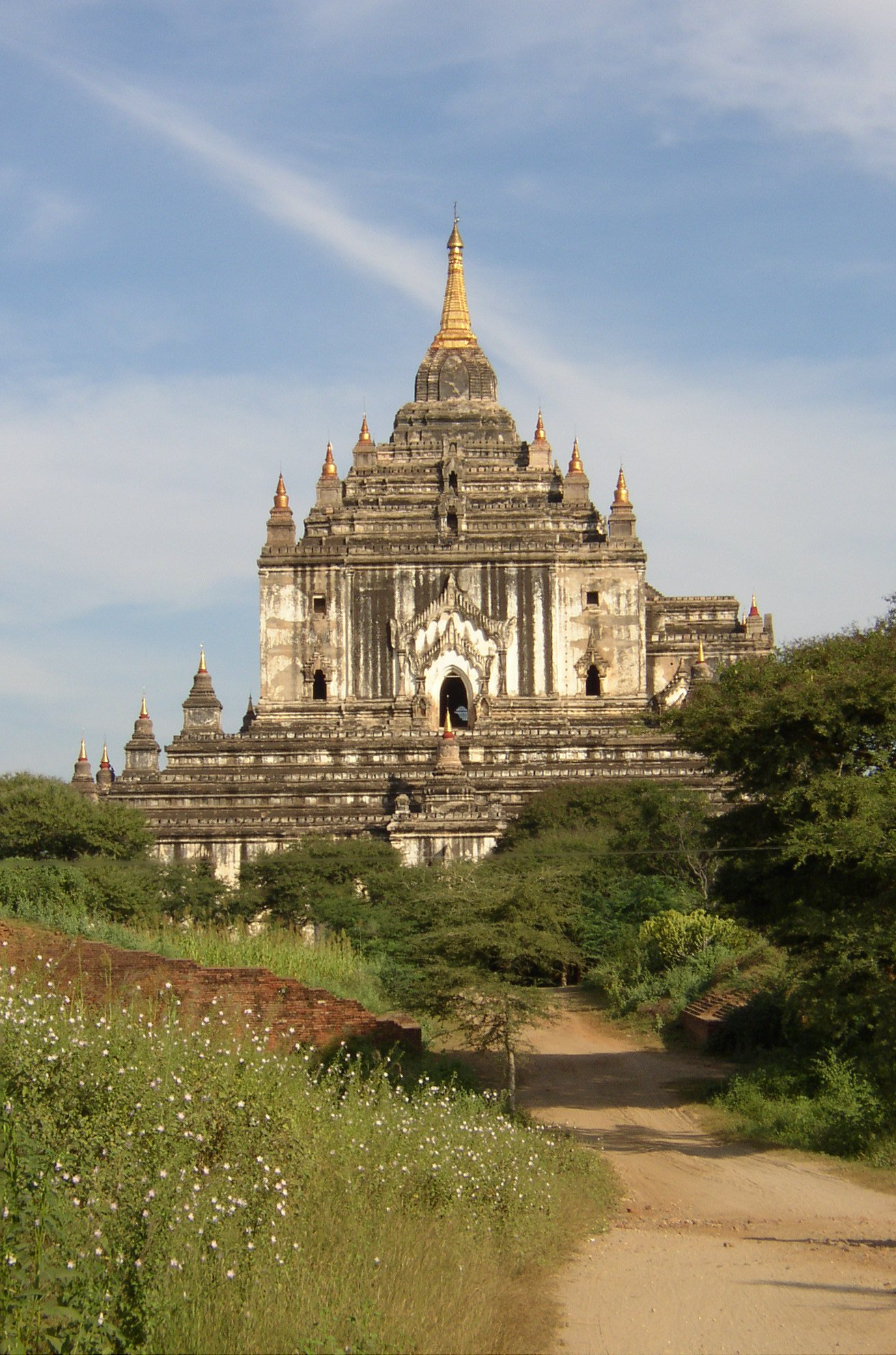
Thatbyinnyu Temple, the tallest in Pagan (Bagan)

The wealth funded the temple building boom that began in his grandfather's reign. However, a noticeable shift from the Mon architecture to a Burman-style architecture began. The temples built during his reign include the last examples of Mon architecture at Pagan as well as the earliest efforts to construct Burman-style temples, the most famous example of which is the Thatbyinnyu. Consecrated in 1144, the temple stands about 500 yards from the Ananda Temple, and with its spire rising to a height of over 200 feet (61 m), it is the tallest of all the Pagan monuments. He also built the Shwegugyi Temple, next to the palace.

== Fall out with Min Shin Saw ==
His eldest son Min Shin Saw was the heir-apparent for most of Sithu's reign. In the 1160s, the king banished Min Shin Saw for the latter's ill treatment of people. Having sent Min Shin Saw a small town about 90 miles north of Pagan, Sithu then appointed the second son Narathu as heir apparent.

== Death ==
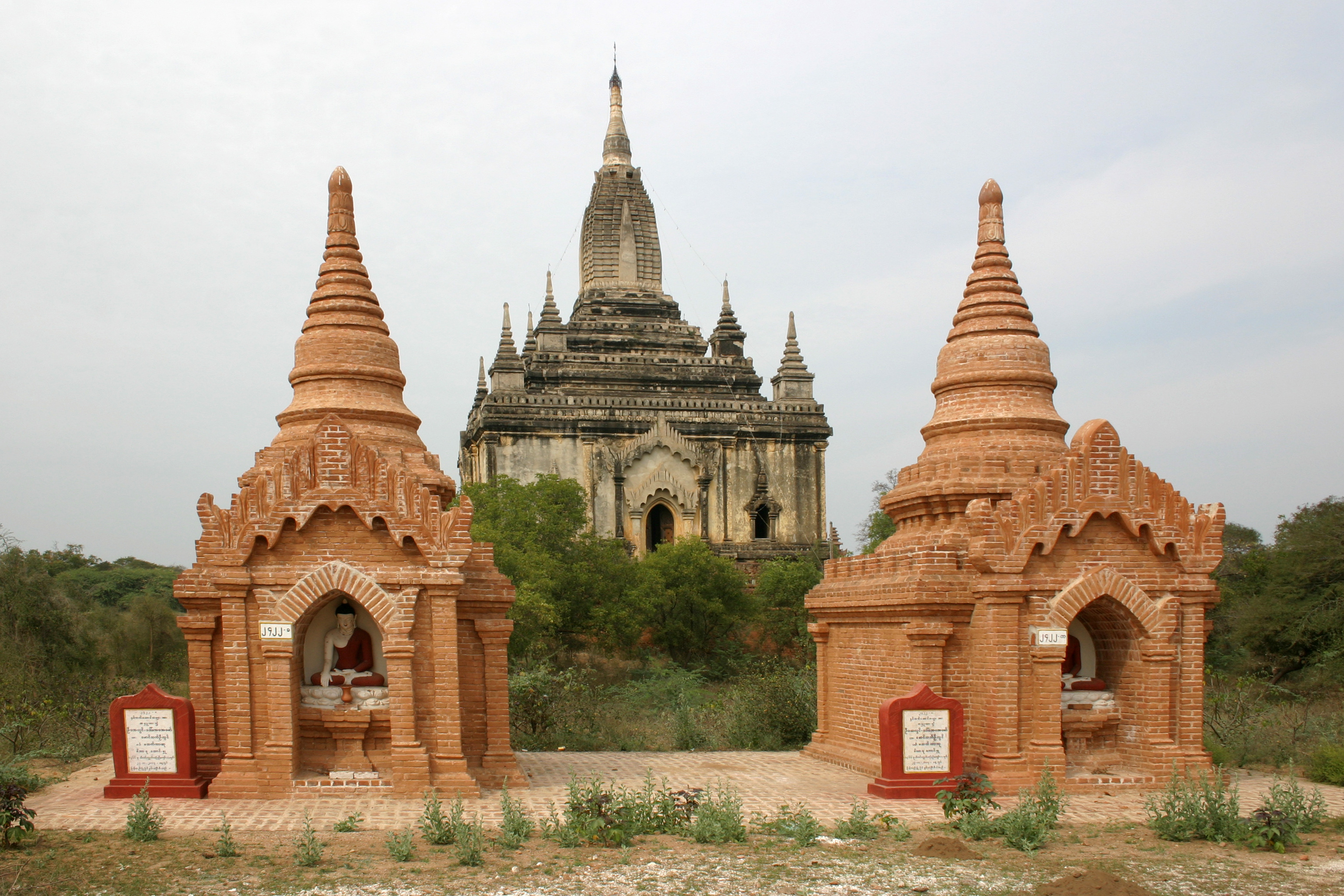
Shwegugyi Temple where Sithu was assassinated

In 1167, Sithu fell ill. Narathu, who could not wait to be king, moved the king from the palace to the nearby Shwegugyi Temple. When he regained consciousness, Sithu was furious that he had been set aside. Narathu came in and smothered the king with bedclothes.

Sithu is posthumously remembered in Burmese history as Alaungsithu (lit. Sithu the Maitreya Buddha) for his numerous pious deeds. The devout Buddhist king was also inducted into the pantheon of Burmese animist nats as Min Sithu. (All but one of the nat sprits in the pantheon were murdered.)

== Min Sithu ==
Min Sithu (Burmese: မင်းစည်သူ, pronounced [mɪ́ɰ̃ sìθù]) is one of the 37 nats in the Burmese pantheon of nats. Min Sithu is attributed represent either Alaungsithu or Narapatisithu. He is portrayed sitting on a throne with one knee up and his foot on the seat, wearing royal garments.

== Bibliography ==
- Cœdès, George (1966). The making of South East Asia. University of California Press.
- Coedès, George (1968). Walter F. Vella (ed.). The Indianized States of Southeast Asia. trans.Susan Brown Cowing. University of Hawaii Press. ISBN 978-0-8248-0368-1.
- Harvey, G. E. (1925). History of Burma: From the Earliest Times to 10 March 1824. London: Frank Cass & Co. Ltd.
- Htin Aung, Maung (1967). A History of Burma. New York and London: Cambridge University Press.
- Kala, U (1724). Maha Yazawin (in Burmese). Vol. 1–3 (2006, 4th printing ed.). Yangon: Ya-Pyei Publishing.
- Kyaw Thet (1962). History of Burma (in Burmese). Yangon: Yangon University Press.
- Lieberman, Victor B. (2003). Strange Parallels: Southeast Asia in Global Context, c. 800–1830, volume 1, Integration on the Mainland. Cambridge University Press. ISBN 978-0-521-80496-7.
- Maha Sithu (1798). Myint Swe; Kyaw Win; Thein Hlaing (eds.). Yazawin Thit (in Burmese). Vol. 1–3 (2012, 2nd printing ed.). Yangon: Ya-Pyei Publishing.
- Pe, Maung Tin; Luce, G.H. The Glass Palace Chronicle of the Kings of Burma (1960 ed.). Rangoon University Press.
- Royal Historians of Burma (c. 1680). U Hla Tin (ed.). Zatadawbon Yazawin (1960 ed.). Historical Research Directorate of the Union of Burma.
- Royal Historical Commission of Burma (1832). Hmannan Yazawin (in Burmese). Vol. 1–3 (2003 ed.). Yangon: Ministry of Information, Myanmar.
- Tarling, Nicholas (1999). The Cambridge History of Southeast Asia: Early Times to c. 1500. Cambridge University Press. ISBN 978-0-521-66369-4.
- Taw, Sein Ko; Blagden, C.O. (1911). "Royal Asiatic Society of Great Britain and Ireland". The Journal of the Royal Asiatic Society of Great Britain and Ireland. Royal Asiatic Society of Great Britain and Ireland: 209–216. JSTOR 25189843.
- Wicks, Robert S. (1992). Money, markets, and trade in early Southeast Asia: the development of indigenous monetary systems to AD 1400. SEAP Publications. ISBN 978-0-87727-710-1.
- Than Tun (1964). Studies in Burmese History (in Burmese). Vol. 1. Yangon: Maha Dagon.

Alaungsithu Pagan Dynasty Born: 17 January 1090 Died: 1167
Regnal titles
Preceded by Kyansittha	King of Burma; 1112/13–1167	Succeeded by Min Shin Saw (Consecrated); Narathu
Royal titles
Preceded by Saw Lu	Heir to the Burmese Throne; 1090–1112/13	Succeeded by Min Shin Saw
