= Yadanabon I of Pagan =

Yadanabon I ရတနာပုံ

Chief queen consort of Burma
- Tenure: 1112 – c. 1150s
- Predecessor: Thanbula
- Successor: Ti Lawka Sanda Dewi
- Born: c. 1090s Pagan (Bagan)
- Died: c. 1150s Pagan
- Spouse: Sithu I
- Issue: Min Shin Saw
- House: Pagan
- Religion: Theravada Buddhism

Yadanabon (Burmese: ရတနာပုံ, pronounced [jədənàbòʊɴ]) was the first chief queen consort of King Sithu I of Pagan Dynasty of Burma (Myanmar). The queen was the mother of Crown Prince Min Shin Saw. She was still alive in 1151/52 (513 ME) when she successfully persuaded her husband to change the prison sentence for Min Shin Saw to an exile. The queen apparently did not outlive her husband; according to the royal chronicles, she was succeeded as chief queen (Usaukpan) by Ti Lawka Sanda Dewi.

== Bibliography ==
- Maha Sithu (2012) [1798]. Kyaw Win; Thein Hlaing (eds.). Yazawin Thit (in Burmese). Vol. 1–3 (2nd ed.). Yangon: Ya-Pyei Publishing.
- Pe, Maung Tin; G.H. Luce. The Glass Palace Chronicle of the Kings of Burma (1960 ed.). Yangon: Rangoon University Press.
- Royal Historical Commission of Burma (1832). Hmannan Yazawin (in Burmese). Vol. 1–3 (2003 ed.). Yangon: Ministry of Information, Myanmar.

Yadanabon I of Pagan Pagan Kingdom Born: c. 1090s Died: c. 1150s
Royal titles
Preceded by Thanbula as Chief Queen	Chief queen consort of Burma and Queen of the Northern Palace; 1112–1150s	Succeeded by Ti Lawka Sanda Dewi as Chief Queen
Preceded by Manisanda as Queen of the Northern Palace	Chief queen consort of Burma and Queen of the Northern Palace; 1112–1150s	Succeeded by Myauk Pyinthe (Narathu) as Queen of the Northern Palace
