= Sanda Wimala I =

Sanda Wimala I စန္ဒာဝိမလရာဇာ

King of Arakan
- Reign: 18 June 1700 - 30 March 1707
- Predecessor: Naradipati
- Successor: Sanda Thuriya II
- Born: 1680/81; Mrauk-U
- Died: 1708 (aged 27); Chittagong
- Consort: Phwar Saw (ဖွားစော)
- Issue: two or three daughters (whose named not recorded in the chronicles)
Names
- Kyawthinkha Sanda Wimala Dhamma Raza - ကျော်သိဂ် စန္ဒာဝိမလဓမ္မရာဇာ
- House: Narapatigyi
- Religion: Therevada Buddhism

Sanda Wimala I (Arakanese:စန္ဒာဝိမလ, was a king of the Mrauk-U Dynasty of Arakan. He was initially defeated by colliation of rebels, fled to Bengal and died.

== Bibliography ==
- Harvey, G. E. (1925). History of Burma: From the Earliest Times to 10 March 1824. London: Frank Cass & Co. Ltd.
- Myat Soe, ed. (1964). Myanma Swezon Kyan (in Burmese). Vol. 9 (1 ed.). Yangon: Sarpay Beikman.
- Myint-U, Thant (2006). The River of Lost Footsteps—Histories of Burma. Farrar, Straus and Giroux. ISBN 978-0-374-16342-6.
- Sandamala Linkara, Ashin (1931). Rakhine Yazawinthit Kyan (in Burmese). Vol. 1–2 (1997 ed.). Yangon: Tetlan Sarpay.
