= List of Arakanese monarchs =

King of Mrauk-U
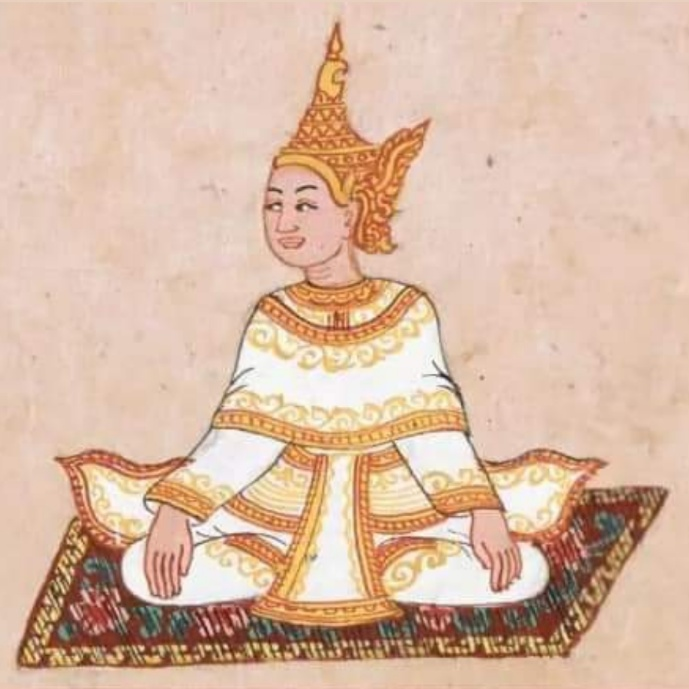
- Last to reign Maha Thammada; 2 December 1782 – 9 January 1785

Details
- Style: His Majesty
- First monarch: Marayu (starting from Dhanyawadi period); Khittathin (starting from Le-Mro Period)
- Last monarch: Maha Thammada
- Formed: 2666 BC (starting from Dhanyawadi period); 818 (starting from Le-Mro Period)
- Abolished: 9 January 1785

The following is a list of monarchs of Arakan, covering the monarchs of the major kingdoms of Arakanese that existed in the present day Rakhine State.

For the Dhanyawadi and Waithali periods, various royal chronicles suggest that the dynasties were likely influenced by Indian rulers, with legends originating it from Sanskrit or Pali sources. These chronicles often connect the rulers to Indian Kingdoms. However, many of these accounts are also a blend of myths and historically based legendary figures, with different chronicles presenting varying dates and lists of kings.

== Early Periods (2666 BCE) ==
- See List of early and legendary monarchs of Arakan

== Lemro Period (818–1406) ==
Unless otherwise noted, the regnal dates in this section are abbreviated to the first Western calendar year only although the Burmese calendar straddles the Western calendar. For example, the start of King Khittathin's reign, 380 ME (26 March 1018 to 25 March 1019 CE), is shown here only as 1018 (instead of 1018/19). While Arakanese Chronicles shows the dates of reign of Khittathin are from 818 (26 March 180 to 25 March 828 CE).

=== Pyinsa (818–1103) ===
Monarch	Reign	Relationship	Notes
Khittathin	818–828	founder	grandnephew of Chula Taing Sanda/son of Sandaku
Sandathin	828–843	brother	
Min Yin Phyu	843–873	son	
Naga Thuriya	873–904	son	
Thuriya Raza	904–936	son	
Ponnaka	936–969	son	
Min Gyiphyu	969–984	son	
Sithabin	984–986		usurper
Min Nangyi	986–1014	son of Min Phyugyi	
Min Lade	1014–1034	son	
Min Kala	1043–1062	son	
Min Bilu	1062–1068	son	
Thinkhaya	1068–1076	Chief of the Thet People	usurper
Min Than	1076–1090	son	
Min Pati	1190–1103	son	

=== Parein (1103–1167) ===
Monarch	Reign	Relationship	Notes
Letya Min Nan	1103–1109	grandson of Min Bilu/son of Min Re-baya	Pagan nominee; 1118 ascension per Pagan dates
Thihaba	1109–1110	son	
Razagyi	1110–1112	son	
Thagiwin I	1112–1115	son	
Thagiwin II	1115–1133	son	
Kawliya	1133–1153	son	Built the Mahâti Temple
Datharaza	1153–1165	son	Historians called him as the "Ashoka of Arakan"
Ananthiri	1165–1167	son	

=== Hkrit (1167–1180) ===
Monarch	Reign	Relationship	Notes
Minpunsa	1167–1174	brother	son of Datharaza
Pyinsakawa	1174–1176	son	
Danayupok	1176–1179	son	
Salinkabo	1179–1180		usurper

=== Nyeinzara Toungoo (1180–1237) ===
Monarch	Reign	Relationship	Notes
Misuthin	1180–1191	son of Danayupok	
Ngaranman	1191–1193	son	
Ngapogan	1193–1195	son	
Ngarakhaing	1195–1198	son	
Ngakyon	1198–1201	son	
Ngasu	1201–1205	son	
Swe Thin	1205–1206	son	
Minkhaung I	1206–1207	brother	
Minkhaung II	1207–1208	son	
Kabalaung I	1208–1209	son	
Kabalaung II	1209–1210	son	
Letya I	1210–1218	son	
Letya II	1218–1229	son	
Thanabin	1229–1232	son	
Nganathin	1232–1234	son	
Nganalon	1234–1250	son	

=== Launggyet (1251–1406) ===
Monarch	Reign	Relationship	Notes
Alawmaphyu	1250–1256	son of Nganalon	Founder
Razathu I	1256–1258	son	
Saw Lu	1258–1261	son	
Uzana I	1261–1269	son	
Saw Mon I	1269–1273	son	
Nankyargyi	1273–1277	son	
Min Bilu	1277–1280	son	
Sithabin I	1283-		usurper
Min Hti	1283–1389	son of Min Bilu	
Uzana II	1389–1391	son	
Thiwarit	1391–1392	younger half-brother	son of Min Hti
Thinhse	1392–1394	younger brother	son of Min Hti
Razathu II	1394–1395	son	grandson of Min Hti
Sithabin II	1395–1397		usurper
Myinhseingyi	1397		usurper
Razathu II	1397–1401		restored
Theinkhathu	1401–1404	brother	son of Thinshe
Saw Mon II	1404–1406	nephew	son of Razathu II Great Grandson of Min Hti

== Interregnum (1406–1429) ==
=== North Arakan ===
Name	Image	Reign From	Reign Until	Relationship with predecessor(s)
Anawrahta		after 29 November 1406	March 1408	Ava's vassal
Min Khayi or Min Saw Mon		March 1408	early 1411	Hanthawaddy's vassal Min Khayi per Rakhine Razawin Thit; Min Saw Mon, per Razadarit Ayedawbon
Thray Sithu		1408 [sic]	1409 [sic]	Vassal ruler of Ava per Rakhine Razawin Thit'; Not found in Burmese chronicles, which say Arakan was not under Ava rule during this period
Letya		early 1411	early 1412	Governor-general of North Arakan (Ava's vassal)
Naranu		1412	18 April 1429	Ruler at Launnggyet (Hanthawaddy's vassal to 1421)
Kyaswa		1413	1416	Ruler at Khway-Thin Taung (Ava's vassal) according to Rakhine Razawin Thit'; not found in Burmese chronicles

=== Sandoway (Thandwe) ===
Name	Image	Reign From	Reign Until	Relationship with predecessor(s)
Sokkate		early 1411	early 1412	Governor-general of Sandoway (Ava's vassal)
Thon-Ywa-Za		1412?	1436?	Hanthawaddy's vassal to 1421
Saw Yin Mi; Saw Yandameit; Baya Minye		1436?	1437	Co-regents

== Mrauk U (1429–1785) ==
The reign dates are per the Arakanese chronicle Rakhine Razawin Thit (Sandamala Linkara Vol. 2 1931), converted into Western dates using (Eade 1989). (Some Arakanese chronicles state the foundation of the kingdom a year later, 1430. Moreover, the end of the kingdom is given per Burmese records, 2 January 1785. Arakanese records give a day earlier, 1 January 1785.)

Name	Image	Reign From	Reign Until	Relationship with predecessor(s)
Narameikhla		18 April 1429	9 May 1433	Founder
Naranu		9 May 1433	c. January 1459	Brother
Ba Saw Phyu		c. January 1459	5 August 1482	Son
Dawlya		5 August 1482	c. February 1492	Son
Ba Saw Nyo		c. February 1492	c. January 1494	uncle, son of Khayi
Ran Aung		c. January 1494	c. July 1494	Grandnephew, son of Dawlya
Salingathu		c. July 1494	February 1502	Maternal uncle
Raza		February 1502	c. November 1513	Son
Gazapati		c. November 1513	January 1515	Son
Saw O		January 1515	July 1515	Granduncle; brother of Salingathu
Thazata		July 1515	c. April 1521	Son of Dawlya
Minkhaung		c. April 1521	27 May 1531	Younger Brother
Min Bin		27 May 1531	11 January 1554	Son of Min Raza
Dikkha		11 January 1554	6 March 1556	Son
Saw Hla		6 March 1556	24 July 1564	Son
Sekkya		24 July 1564	7 February 1572	Brother
Hpalaung		7 February 1572	4 July 1593	Son of Min Bin
Razagyi		4 July 1593	4 July 1612	Son
Khamaung		4 July 1612	14 May 1622	Son
Thiri Thudhamma		14 May 1622	29 May 1638	Son
Sanay		29 May 1638	17 June 1638	Son
Narapati		17 June 1638	13 December 1645	Great grandson of Min Bin
Thado		13 December 1645	c. May 1652	Son
Sanda Thudhamma		c. May 1652	11 June 1674	Son
Uggabala		11 June 1674	16 April 1685	Son
Wara Dhamma		16 April 1685	20 June 1692	Brother
Mani Dhamma		20 June 1692	20 December 1694	Elder brother
Sanda Thuriya I		20 December 1694	4 August 1696	Brother
Nawrahta		4 August 1696	18 August 1696	Son
Mayuppiya		18 August 1696	13 May 1697	Usurper
Kalamandat		16 May 1697	5 June 1698	Usurper
Naradipati		5 June 1698	17 June 1700	Son of Sanda Thuriya
Sanda Wimala I		18 June 1700	30 March 1707	Grandson of Thado
Sanda Thuriya II		3 April 1707	September 1710	Grandson of Sanda Thudhamma
Interregnum ~2 months
Sanda Wizaya		November 1710	April 1731	Usurper
Sanda Thuriya III		April 1731	1734	Son-in-law
Naradipati II		1734	1735	Son
Narapawara		1735	September 1737	Usurper
Sanda Wizala		September 1737	25 March 1738	Cousin
Madarit		28 March 1738	6 February 1743	Brother
Nara Apaya		6 February 1743	28 October 1761	Uncle
Thirithu		28 October 1761	3 February 1762	Son
Sanda Parama		3 February 1762	1 May 1764	Brother
Apaya		1 May 1764	17 January 1774	Brother-in-law
Sanda Thumana		17 January 1774	5 May 1777	Brother-in-law
Sanda Wimala II		6 May 1777	5 June 1777	Usurper
Sanda Thaditha		5 June 1777	1 December 1782	Usurper
Maha Thammada		2 December 1782	2 January 1785	nephew in-law

== See also ==
- List of Burmese monarchs
- List of heirs to the Burmese thrones

== Bibliography ==
- Harvey, G. E. (1925). History of Burma: From the Earliest Times to 10 March 1824. London: Frank Cass & Co. Ltd.
- Pan Hla, Nai (1968). Razadarit Ayedawbon (in Burmese) (8th printing, 2005 ed.). Yangon: Armanthit Sarpay.
- Phayre, Lt. Gen. Sir Arthur P. (1883). History of Burma (1967 ed.). London: Susil Gupta.
- Royal Historical Commission of Burma (1832). Hmannan Yazawin (in Burmese). Vol. 1–3 (2003 ed.). Yangon: Ministry of Information, Myanmar.
- Sandamala Linkara, Ashin (1931). Rakhine Yazawinthit Kyan (in Burmese). Vol. 1–2 (1997 ed.). Yangon: Tetlan Sarpay.

== External sources ==
- Charney, Michael W. (1999). 'Where Jambudipa and Islamdom Converged: Religious Change and the Emergence of Buddhist Communalism in Early Modern Arakan, 15th-19th Centuries.' PhD Dissertation, University of Michigan.
- Charney, Michael W. (1993). 'Arakan, Min Yazagyi, and the Portuguese: The Relationship Between the Growth of Arakanese Imperial Power and Portuguese Mercenaries on the Fringe of Mainland Southeast Asia 1517-1617.' Masters dissertation, Ohio University.
- Leider, Jacques P. (2004). 'Le Royaume d'Arakan, Birmanie. Son histoire politique entre le début du XVe et la fin du XVIIe siècle,' Paris, EFEO.
