= Minpunsa =

Minpunsa မင်းဖုန်းစား

King of Arakan
- Reign: 1167 – 1174 A.D.
- Predecessor: Ananthiri
- Successor: Pyinsakawa
- Born: 1141/1142 CE; Parein
- Died: 1174 CE (aged 32); Hkrit
- Consort: Thamardi and others
- Issue: Pyinsakawa/Punnasin (ပုဏ္ဏကဝ); Minsuthin (မဉ္ဇူသင်း)
- House: Parein
- Father: Datharaza
- Religion: Theravada Buddhism

Minpunsa (Burmese: မင်းဖုန်းစား) was the founder of one of the early Le-Mro cities known as Hkrit. He reigned from 1167 to 1174 A.D. He is primarily known for his military success in repelling an invasion by the Shan people and for restoring stability to the kingdom after the reign of his brother, Ananthiri, who had been notorious for his tyranny. He is also the son of king Datharaza, who was the 7th king of Parein dynasty.

== Reign ==
Minpunsa ascended the throne in 1167 A.D., following the deposition and death of his older brother, Anan-thi-ri. He established the royal capital at Hkrit, situated along the Lemyo River.

He was successful in defense against a Shan invasion. The Shan army attempted to invade the kingdom, but Minpunsa's forces were able to defeat them in the Yoma mountains, effectively repelling the invaders. As a result of the victory, several Shan prisoners were captured and settled in two villages in the Taungbet region of Arakan, which was a strategic move to integrate the prisoners into the kingdom and ensure long-term peace.

== Death ==
Minpunsa's reign lasted for 7 years. He died in 1174 A.D. and was succeeded by his son Pyinsakawa.

== See also ==
- List of Arakanese monarchs
