= Min Pati =

Min Padi မင်းပတိ

King of Arakan
- Reign: 1190–1103 CE
- Predecessor: Minthan
- Successor: Letya-minnan
- Born: 1154 CE; Pyinsa
- Died: c. 1102/1103 CE (aged 49); Pyinsa
- House: Thinkaya
- Father: Minthan
- Religion: Theravada Buddhism

Min Pati (Rakhine: မင်းပတိ; also spelled as Min Padi) was the last king and 15th king of Pyinsa dynasty of the early Le-mro period.

== Ancestry ==
He ascended the throne following the death of his father, King Minthan, around 1092 CE. Min Padi belonged to a line of rulers descending from Thinkaya, a noble who had earlier usurped the throne.

== Fall and death ==
During Min Padi's reign, Letya-minnan, a descendant of the former royal line, sought to reclaim the throne. In 1102 CE, the King of Pagan, Alaung-sithu, dispatched a large expeditionary force comprising 100,000 Pyus and 100,000 Talaings to support Letya-minnan's restoration. After initial resistance, Min Padi was defeated and slain in battle, leading to Letya-minnan's installation as the ruler of Arakan.

Min Padi's death lead to the end of the Pyinsa dynasty and beginning of Parein dynasty established by Letya Min Nan.

== See also ==
- List of Arakanese monarchs
