= Kawliya of Parein =

Kawliya ကောလိယာ

King of Arakan
- Reign: 1133 – 1153 CE
- Coronation: 1133 CE
- Predecessor: Thagiwin II
- Successor: Dasaraza
- Born: Parein
- Died: 1153 CE
- Consort: Kumari
- Issue: Datharaza
- House: Parein
- Religion: Theravada Buddhism

Kawliya (Rakhine:ဂတ္တလယာ; also spelled Gâtalaya) was the 6th king of Parein dynasty of early Le-mro period. He reigned from 1133 to 1153 A.D.

== Reign ==
The king ascended the throne in 495 A.E. (1133 A.D.). During his reign, Arakan achieved considerable prestige, and it is recorded that the kings of Bengal, Pegu, Pagan (Bagan), and Siam paid homage to him.

One of his notable achievements was the construction of the Mahâti Temple, located a few miles south of the present town of Arakan. The idol housed in this temple was considered, in terms of sanctity, second only to the famous Mahamuni image. However, the Mahâti temple and its idol were later destroyed during the First Anglo-Burmese War when the site was fortified by Burmese forces.

== Death ==
The king ruled for twenty years and died in 515 A.E. (1153 A.D.). He was succeeded by his son Datharaza.

== See also ==
- List of Arakanese monarchs
