= Letya Min Nan =

King of Arakan

Letya Min-Nann of Parein လက်ျာမင်းနန်

King of Arakan
- Reign: 1103–1109
- Coronation: 1106 CE
- Predecessor: Min Pati (new office)
- Successor: Thihaba
- Born: 1068 CE; Old Bagan
- Died: 1109 CE (aged 41); Parein
- Burial: Nan-Oo Palace, Parein
- Consort: Shwe Gu-Tha
- Issue: Thihaba and one daughter
- House: Pyinsa
- Father: Min Re-baya
- Mother: Saw Pauk Nyo Mya
- Religion: Therevada Buddhism

Letya Min Nan (or Min-Nann; Burmese: လက်ျာမင်းနန်, 1068–1109) was the founder of the Parein Dynasty of Arakan.

== Early life ==
The future king was born in 1068 (430 ME) to Prince Min Re-baya (မင်းရဲဘယ) and Princess Saw Pauk Nyo (စောပေါက်ညို), both of his parents are children of King Min Bilu. The prince grew up in Pagan and where he later also married his younger sister, named Shwe Gu-Tha due to preserving Arakanese royal bloodline.

== Ancestry ==
The prince's origin tracing back to King Khittathin, founder of Pyinsa Dynasty and whom fifth in-descend from him named Min Bilu was slain and killed by an usurper named Thinkhaya, son of the murdered king fled to the Court of Kyansittha and where resided at Bagan and married his own sister, Saw Pauk-Nyo and their son was named Letya Min-Nann.

== Reign ==
=== Restoration to the throne ===
In the year 1103, Arakanese Prince Letya Min Nann was successfully restored to the throne by acceleration of his grandfather in the name of Pagan Sovereign. He was determined to relocate the capital from Pyinsa to newly named place called Launggret.

However, the site proved to be unhealthy and only held temporarily, so he moved the capital to the north past the Paungdok Creek. In the year 1106, he established the new capital, Parein, there and erected a palace named Nan-Oo, on the west bank of Lemro River.

The King died in 1109, he was aged 41 and his son Thibaha who succeeded him.

== Bibliography ==
- U Uar Nha, Ashin (1930). Dhanyawaddy Razawin Thit (in Arakanese). Vol. 1 pg. 283 (2017 ed.). Rangoon.

Preceded by Min Pati	King of Arakan; 1103–1109	Succeeded by Thihaba
