= Ananthiri =

Ananthiri အနန္တသီရိ

King of Arakan
- Reign: 1165–1167
- Predecessor: Dasa Râjâ
- Successor: Minpunsa
- Born: 1139/1140 CE; Parein
- Died: 1167 (aged 27); Parein
- Consort: Thamardi
- House: Parein
- Father: Datharaza
- Religion: Theravada Buddhism

Ananthiri (Burmese: အနန္တသီရိ ; also known as Anantasuriya, reigned 1165–1167) was the last king of Parein dynasty of Arakan. His reign was noted for his oppressive rule, neglect of governance and the eventual uprising that led to his deposition and death.

== Ascension to the Throne ==
Ananthiri ascended the throne following the death of his father, DasaRaja.

== Reign ==
Ananthiri's rule lasted only two years, from 1165 to 1167. He became infamous for spending his time in riot and debauchery, rather than managing the affairs of state.

During his reign, the country suffered from the loss of imperial territories that had been maintained by his father and grandfather. Ananthiri also extracted large sums of money from the population, further alienating the people. His reign saw significant social and economic decline with widespread dissatisfaction among the population.

== Downfall and Deposition ==
Due to his failure to address the kingdom's problems, the people began to rise against him. This general uprising culminated in his deposition and he was murdered by his own people in 1167.

After his death, he was succeeded by his younger brother Minpunsa.

== See also ==
- List of Arakanese monarchs
