= Rakhine National Day =

Myanmar annual celebration by Rakhine people

- Observed by: Rakhine people
- Type: Cultural
- Frequency: Annual
- Related to: Rakhine State Day

Rakhine National Day (Burmese: ရခိုင်အမျိုးသားနေ့) is an annual observance celebrated by the Rakhine people on the first waning day of Kason, the second month of the traditional Burmese calendar. The date was established during the Rakhine National Conference held in Kyaukphyu in 2014, following a unanimous vote by representatives of participating organizations.

The first celebration of Rakhine National Day at the Rakhine Dhamma Hall, eastern entrance of the Shwedagon Pagoda, Yangon, on 14 May 2017.

The observance commemorates the completion of the casting of the Mahamuni Buddha image, which is traditionally associated with King Candrasuriya of the ancient kingdom of Dhanyawadi. The inaugural Rakhine National Day celebrations took place on 14 May 2014 in Yangon and across various townships in Rakhine State.
