= Marayu =

Marayu မာရယု

King of Dhanyawaddy
- Reign: 2666 BC - 2604 BC
- Predecessor: Founder
- Successor: Mara Zi I
- Born: 2684 BC near the Mikhyoung River of Kaladan
- Died: 2604 BC (aged 80); Dhanyawadi
- Consort: Rusitamala (ရုစိတမာလာ, Rucitamālā)
- Issue: Mara Zi I
- Father: Rishi Arjuna (အဇ္ဇုနရသေ့)
- Mother: Indramāyu (ဣန္ဒမာယု)
- Religion: Hinduism

Mārayu (Burmese:မာရယု) was the legendary founder of Dhanyawadi Kingdom and the first mythical king of Arakan. He is considered as founding king of the ancient Arakanese civilization settled around the Kaladan River Valley. Born from a Brahmin lineage and who later married the daughter of chief of Mro Tribe. He initially defeated the Rakshasas occupying Waithali, whose named trace to the name of "Rakhine", and founded the city of Dhanyawadi.

== History ==
According to legend, Marayu's birth occurred under unusual circumstances. His mother, Indramāyu, a doe believed to be descended from a lion, gave birth to him in the forest near the mouth of the Mikhyoung River, a tributary of the Kaladan River. His father was sage Arjuna who was a former king who had become a hermit in the forest near the source of the Kaladan river.

After his birth, Marayu was discovered by a chief of the Mro tribe, who was hunting in the forest with his dog. The chief adopted the child and raised him as his own. Upon reaching maturity, Marayu married Mipinnyā (မိပိန်ညာ), who was the daughter of the Mro chief, and gave her the title Rucitamālā (ရုစိတမာလာ).

He was later granted magical weapons by the gods. Using these weapons, Marayu successfully defeated the ogres (Rakshasa), hostile beings described as ravaging the countryside and attacking humans, particularly at night. Following the defeat of the monsters, Marayu was acknowledged as king by the local population.

The king built seven grand halls were built at the site known as "Seven-Hall Village". In this place the king and his wife were formally anointed and accepted as king and queen.

=== Reign and death ===
Historical chronicles state that Marayu ascended the throne at the age of 18 years and reigned for 62 years, dying at the age of 80 years. Arakanese historians claim that his lineage continued in an unbroken succession until the Burmese conquest of Arakan in 1784 BC. According to the historian Ngami, although this account slightly differs from others, there were 54 sovereigns descended from Marayu who ruled for a total of 1,833 years. Based on this chronology, Marayu would have ascended the throne around 2658 BCE.

== See also ==
- History of Rakhine
- Rakhine People
- Dhanyawadi

== Bibliography ==
- Sandamala Linkara, Ashin (1931). Rakhine Razawin Thit (in Arakanese). Vol. 1–2 (1997-1999 ed.). Rangoon: Tetlan Sarpay.
- U Uar Nha, Ashin (1930). Dhanyawaddy Razawin Thit (in Arakanese). Vol. 1–2 (2010 ed.). Yangon: Rakhine Thargyi Sarpay.
