= Waithali kingdom =

Second Arakanese kingdom in western Burma

Coordinates: 20°39′46″N 93°9′0″E

Waithali kingdom ဝေသာလီ
- 370 AD (Note: approximate according to Lt. Gen. Sir Arthur P. Phayre (1883). History of Burma (1967 ed.).)–818 AD
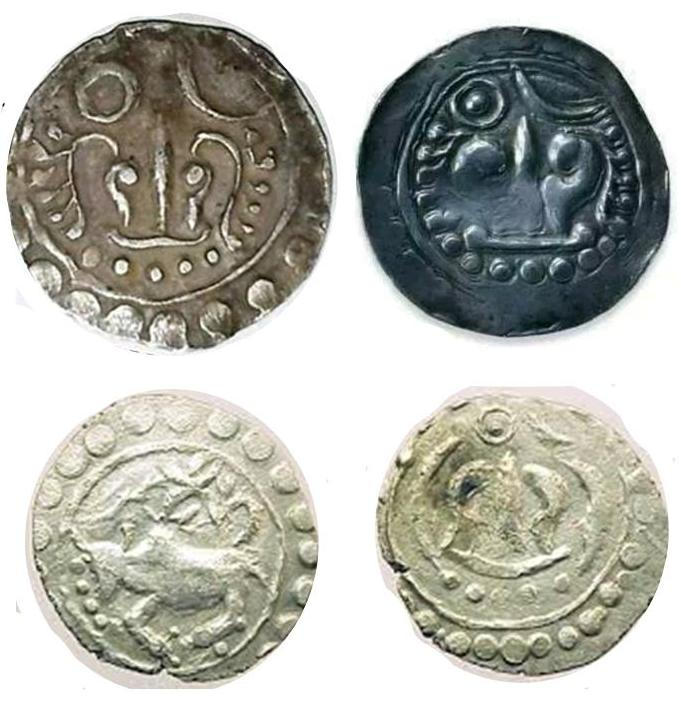
- Arakan coins from Vesali period showing the Shrivatsa symbol
- Status: Kingdom (part of Chandra dynasty)
- Capital: Waithali
- Common languages: Possibly Magadhi Prakrit, Sanskrit
- Religion: Mahayana Buddhism, Hinduism
- Government: Monarchy
- History
  - Founding of dynasty: 370 AD (Note: approximate according to Lt. Gen. Sir Arthur P. Phayre (1883). History of Burma (1967 ed.).)
  - End of kingdom: 818 AD
Preceded by
| Dhanyawadi |
Succeeded by
| Le-Mro period |
| Pyinsa |
| Parein |
| Launggyet dynasty |
- Today part of: Myanmar, Bangladesh

The Waithali kingdom (Rakhine: ဝေသာလီ ; Magadhi Prakrit: Vesali) was an ancient kingdom that flourished in the Arakan region of present-day Rakhine State, Myanmar, and Chittagong Division of Bangladesh from approximately 2nd century BC to 7th century AD. Established as a successor to the Dhanyawadi kingdom, Waithali is also one of the most indianized Arakanese kingdom bridging South and Southeast Asia through trade and religious exchange.

Following the decline of Dhanyawadi, Rakhine's power center shifted to Vesali, ushering in an early Golden Age for the region. During this period, Vesali's influence extended across the Kaladan and Lemro River valleys and reached as far as Chittagong, in present-day Bangladesh. According to the western section of King Ananda Sanda’s stone inscription at Shaitthaung Temple, it indicates that the kingdom existed during the 9th and 10th centuries AD. Waithali was the capital of this kingdom.

== Etymology ==
Vesali (Waithali) was named after the Indian city of Vaishali which is popular in Buddhist traditions.

== History ==
The center power of Arakan is believed to have shifted from Dhanyawadi to Waithali in around the 4th century, following the end of the Dhanyawadi kingdom around 370 CE. Waithali is also considered as the most Indianized of the early Arakanese kingdoms. Like other states in the region, its economy thrived on trade, connecting the Pyu city-states, China and the Mons in the east with India, Bengal, and Persia in the west. The kingdom flourished along major maritime routes between China and India and became a significant trade hub, with ships arriving annually at its peak. The city itself was built along a tidal creek and enclosed by brick walls, with an urban layout reflecting substantial Hindu and Indian influences.

=== Establishment of kingdom ===
The establishment of Vesali as the capital of Arakan took place around 789 A.D., initiated by Maha-tain Chandra (788–810), who was the son of Suriyaketu (746–788), the king of Chandra Dynasty. The Chandra dynasty is historically significant, with evidence supporting its existence through various coins and inscriptions. The dynasty's rulers, including kings such as Dharmachandra, Priti-Chandra, Dharmavijaya, Nitichandra, and Vimchandra, are believed to have ruled before the 8th or 9th century A.D.

=== Historical documentation ===
An important historical source from this period is the Anandachandra inscription, carved in 729 CE. It indicates that Mahayana Buddhism was widely practiced in Waithali while also claiming that the ruling dynasty traced its lineage to the Hindu god Shiva. The inscription, analyzed by Dr. E. H. Johnston, provides a list of kings beginning with a ruler named Bahubali. The western face of the inscription contains 72 lines of text in 51 verses, chronicling the predecessors of Anandachandra. This Sanskrit inscription is unique within Myanmar, where the use of Sanskrit was otherwise rare. It also alludes to political and religious connections with Sri Lanka and Andhra.

Another historical record from the period is an inscription on a pillar now housed in the Shitthaung Temple at Mrauk-U. The inscription provides a detailed account of the Sri-Dharmarajanuja dynasty, listing 19 kings and their respective regnal periods.

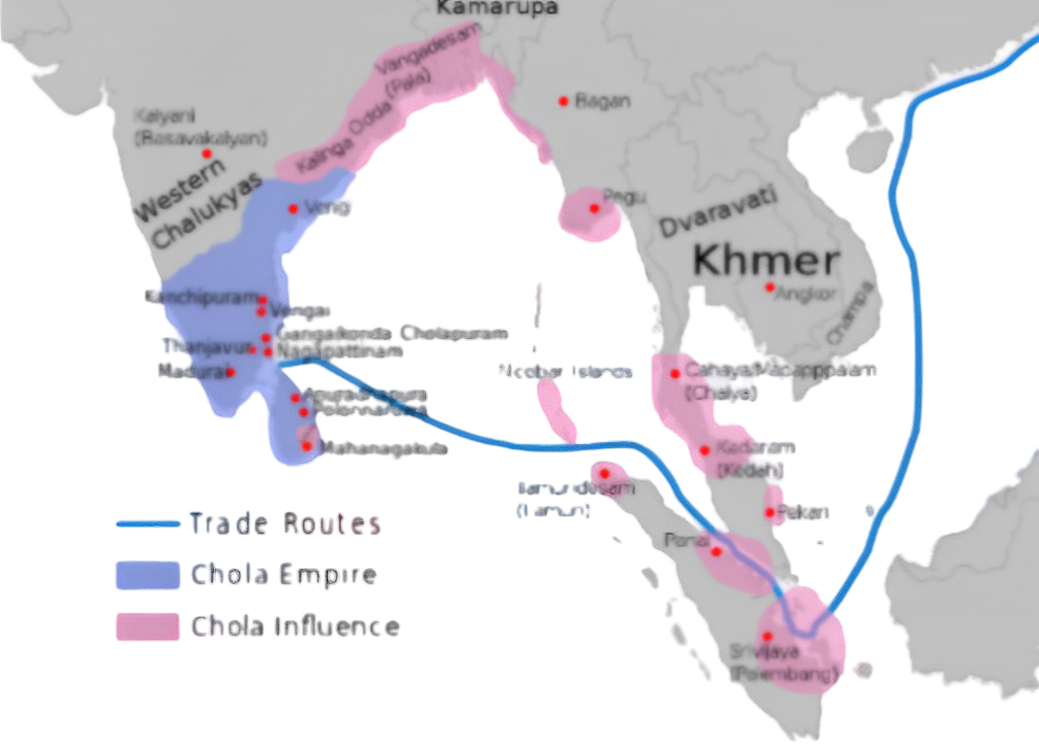
Map showing parts of Arakan influenced by Chola Empire which was preceded by the Chandra dynasty

The Chandra Dynasty maintained trade networks with states in present-day Myanmar, Thailand, Indonesia, and Vietnam. Shipwrecks from the 10th century found off the coast of Javanese provide evidence of maritime connections between southeastern Bengal and Southeast Asia.

=== Notable kings and rulers ===
The Waithali kingdom was governed by the Chandra dynasty. The Chandra kings are described as descendants of the god Shiva, which suggests that they might be followers of Shaivism as well.

Dvenchandra was the first ruler of the kingdom. According to the Saccabandra inscription (found near Waithali), he formalized Brahmanical rituals and Mahayana Buddhism, reflecting his dual patronage of Hindu and Buddhist institutions.

King Bhutichandra expanded Waithali’s territory into the Kaladan Valley, securing trade routes to Bengal.

It is claimed by some Arakanese legends and Rakhine chronicles that King Bahubali was the first ruler of Waithali kingdom. He repelled invasions from the Pyu city-states (central Myanmar) and possibly the Gauda kingdom (Bengal). His reign marked the peak of Waithali’s territorial control, stretching from the Mayu River to the Lemro Valley.

Dhammavijaya, a late seventh-century ruler of Vesali, has been identified by some scholars, such as R. Mitchiner, as the ruler of both Arakan and Harikela (which was itself under Chandra Dynasty) due to the discovery of a significant number of identical coins in Harikela and Samatata (East Bengal). However only two coins bearing his name have been found in Arakan, leading to speculation about his exact role. It has been suggested that Dhammavijaya may have been a descendant of Suriya Candra, ruling first in Harikela before claiming the Vesali throne.

=== Decline ===
The kingdom collapsed after invasions, possibly by the Pyu or Srivijaya (Sumatran empire). According to the Arakanese chronicles, last Chandra king who died at sea and the kingdom was left without an heir. The queen consort was roaming around the upper Kaladan River Valley searching for the rightful male heir whom the king's ring shall perfectly fit the one's finger shall be enthroned. Three Mro Princes who ruled Waithali and whom the last prince was ousted following invasion from the East.

The abandonment of Vesali is tied to the disappearance of King Chiila-tain Chandra, who reportedly wandered with corrupt companions and did not return. The power vacuum that followed led to a change in leadership, with the Mro tribe chief, Amratu, seizing the throne.

The political center of Arakan shifted to the Lemro river starting the Lemro Period (လေးမြို့ခေတ်, lit. four cities period), where new states emerged such as the Launggyet, Parein and Pyinsa.

== Culture ==
The dynasty is particularly noted for introducing Arakanese coinage, predating Burmese coinage by almost a millennium. The coins featured Srivatsa (Rakhine: Thiriwutsa) on one side, while the obverse bore an image of a bull which symbolizes the Chandra dynasty along with the king’s name inscribed in Sanskrit. Comparable designs have been discovered in Chittagong, Dvaravati, and Champa.

The Rakha Wunna alphabet and the usage of Arakanese coins were derived during the Waithali kingdom.

During this period, Buddhism became more widespread, as evidenced by numerous Yedhamma inscriptions written in Sanskrit, Pāli, or combination of both. The presence of the colossal Vesali Buddha image, standing seventeen feet tall, further attests to the prominence of Buddhism in early Vesali. King Vīra Candra is traditionally credited with constructing one hundred Buddha stupas, which were regarded as significant religious monuments.

Despite the dominance of Buddhism, Brahmanic rituals also played a role in Vesali’s courtly traditions. A large statue of a crouching bull was discovered at the center of a brick structure, suggesting its involvement in royal rituals. The bull motif also appears on coins bearing the Sanskrit name of King Vīra Candra. The reverse of these coins features the Srivatsa symbol, representing the king’s role as a guarantor of prosperity. Similar numismatic designs were found in contemporary Pyu cities of Myanmar, as well as in Thailand and southern Vietnam.

Vesali and Dhanyawadi share many similarities with the walled Pyu cities of Central Myanmar. Both cultures built cities with an inner walled area enclosed by an outer city wall. It is believed that the lower classes used the land within the outer walls for agriculture.

The early form of the Arakanese language was used in this period influenced by Sanskrit and Pali.

== See also ==
- History of Rakhine
- Rakhine people
