= Datharaza =

Datharaza ဒဿရာဇာ

King of Arakan
- Reign: 1153 – 1165
- Predecessor: Kawliya
- Successor: Ananthiri
- Born: ? Parein
- Died: 1165
- House: Parein
- Father: Kawliya
- Religion: Theravada Buddhism

Datharaza (Rakhine:ဒသရာဇ ; also spelled as Dasa Râjâ) was the 7th king of the Parein dynasty of Arakan who reigned from 1153 to 1165. He is the son of King Kawliya who built the Mahâti Temple.

== Reign ==
Datharaza ascended the throne in 1153 after the death of his father, King Gatalaya. His reign lasted for twelve years, from 1153 to 1165.

The king is known for repairing the Mahamuni temple, which had been partially destroyed during the reign of King Letya-minnan. The temple was an important religious and cultural site in Arakan, and Datharaza's restoration efforts helped restore its significance.

Along with the physical repairs to the temple, Datharaza also oversaw the restoration of the idol of Mahamuni, which had been damaged during previous conflicts. To carry out the repairs, Datharaza employed tributary kings to assist in the restoration process.

== Death ==
Datharaza died in 1165 after a twelve-year reign. He was succeeded by his son, Ananthiri.

== See also ==
- List of Arakanese monarchs
