= Thihaba =

King of Arakan

Min Thiha of Parein မင်းသီဟ

King of Arakan
- Reign: 1109 - 1110
- Predecessor: Letya Min Nan
- Successor: Razagyi
- Born: 1075 CE; Pagan
- Died: 1110 CE (aged 35); Parein
- Consort: Thabula
- Issue: Razagyi
- House: Parein
- Father: Letya Min Nan
- Mother: Shwe Gu-Tha
- Religion: Theravada Buddhism

Thihaba (Arakanese: သီဟပါ, 1075 – 1110) was the second King of Parein Dynasty of Arakan from 1109 to 1110.

== Reign ==
Prince Thihaba succeeded his father upon founding of new capital city, Parein and reigned for one year. His son Razagyi, succeeded him.

== Bibliographies ==
- U Uar Nha, Ashin (1910). Dhanyawadi Razawin Thite (in Arakanese). Vol. 1 pg. 284 (1930s ed.). Rathedaung Township.
