= Misuthin =

King of Arakan

Misuthin of Parein မဥ္စူသင်း

King of Arakan
- Reign: 1161 - 1166
- Predecessor: Salingabo
- Successor: Ngaraman
- Born: 1134/1135 CE; Parein
- Died: 1166 CE (aged 31); Nyeinzara Toungoo
- Consort: Shwe Sin Pyaung
- Issue: Ngaranman
Names
- Tainggyit Min Misuthin တိုင်းချစ်မင်း မဥ္စူသင်း
- House: Datharaza
- Father: Danayupok
- Mother: Kayla Pu
- Religion: Therevada Buddhism

Misuthin (Burmese: မဥ္စူသင်း;1134/1135 – 1166) also known as Tainggyit Min meaning 'Country Beloved', was a founder of 2nd Parein Dynasty of Arakan and also founded the new capital city of Nyeinzara Toungoo.

== Bibliographies ==
- U Uar Nha, Ashin (1910). Dhanyawadi Razawin Thite (in Arakanese). Vol. 1 pg. 297 (1930s ed.). Rangoon: Rakhine Thargyi Sarpay.
- Phrayne, Arthur (1917). Burma Gazetteer:Akyab District Vol. A. Vol. 1 pg.22 (1967 ed.).
