= Mara Zi I =

Mara Zi I မာရေက်
- King of Arakan
- Reign: 2604–2572 BCE
- Coronation: 2604 BCE
- Predecessor: Marayu
- Successor: Mara Onlin
- Born: 2640 BCE
- Died: 2572 BCE (aged 68)
- Spouse: Unknown
- Issue: Mara Onlin
- House: Dhanyawaddy
- Father: Marayu
- Mother: Rucitamālā

Mara Zi I (Rakhine: မာရေက်, also known as Marauk) was the second king of Dhanyawaddy Arakan who reigned from 2604 to 2572 BCE according to the traditional Dhanyawaddy and Rakhine Razawin Chronicle. He was the son of King Marayu and Queen Rucitamala, and succeeded his father as the ruler of Dhanyawaddy.

== Early life ==
Mara Zi I ascended the throne at the age of 36 following the death of his father, King Marayu. By contrast, Mara Zi I inherited a more stable realm. The chronicles describe him simply as "royal son" (သားတော်) which emphasizes his legitimate lineage but omitting any divine or heroic embellishments.

He became king in 2604 BCE (Sakkaraj 6057) assuming the throne at the Dhanyawaddy Palace.

Mara Zi I was born to Queen Rucitamālā, the principal consort of King Marayu. He had half-siblings.

== Reign ==
The king ruled for 32 years. His reign is described in the chronicles as stable and uneventful, with no major wars, rebellions or territorial expansions. However, an 18th-century chronicle by Saya Nga introduces a war with the Mon which is absent from earlier historical sources.

== See also ==
- List of early and legendary monarchs of Burma

== Bibliography ==
- Sandamala Linkara, Ashin (1931). Rakhine Razawin Thit (in Arakanese). Vol. 1–2 (1997-1999 ed.). Rangoon: Tetlan Sarpay.
- U Uar Nha, Ashin (1930). Dhanyawaddy Razawin Thit (in Arakanese). Vol. 1–2 (2010 ed.). Yangon: Rakhine Thargyi Sarpay.
