= Naradipati II =

Naradipati II of Mrauk U နရဓိပတိ

King of Arakan
- Reign: 1734 - 1736
- Predecessor: Sanda Thuriya III
- Successor: Narapawara
- Died: Mrauk U
- Consort: Nan Htet Mibaya II
- House: Wizaya
- Father: Sanda Thuriya III
- Mother: Hmauk Taw Hla II
- Religion: Therevada Buddhism

Naradipati II (Arakanese:နရဓိပတိကြီး; was a 37th king of the Mrauk-U Dynasty of Arakan.

== Bibliography ==
- Harvey, G. E. (1925). History of Burma: From the Earliest Times to 10 March 1824. London: Frank Cass & Co. Ltd.
- Myat Soe, ed. (1964). Myanma Swezon Kyan (in Burmese). Vol. 9 (1 ed.). Yangon: Sarpay Beikman.
- Myint-U, Thant (2006). The River of Lost Footsteps—Histories of Burma. Farrar, Straus and Giroux. ISBN 978-0-374-16342-6.
- Sandamala Linkara, Ashin (1931). Rakhine Yazawinthit Kyan (in Burmese). Vol. 1–2 (1997 ed.). Yangon: Tetlan Sarpay.
