= Khittathin =

Khittathin ခေတ္တသင်း

King of Arakan
- Reign: 380–390 ME (According to Burmese calendar) 818–828 (According to modern calendar)
- Coronation: 380 ME
- Predecessor: Ngaton Min
- Successor: Sandathin
- Born: 983 CE; Sambukwa
- Died: 1018 CE (aged 35); Pyinsa, Arakan
- Consort: Geri kumari
- Issue: Unknown
- House: Chandra
- Father: San Da Htu
- Mother: Sula Taing Tsa Da Ya Ma
- Religion: Theravada Buddhism

Khittathin (Rakhine: ခေတ္တသင်း) was the founder of Pyinsa dynasty of the ancient Arakan who reigned during the early Le-mro period.

== Background ==
Khittathin was the eldest son of Queen San Da Htu and a nephew of the previous Arakanese king Sula Taing Chandra of Waithali. His mother had remarried after the disappearance of Chandra, marrying his nephew San Daku, giving birth to Khittathin and his two siblings.

Khittathin like many other kings married his own sister to perverse royal bloodline.

During this time, Arakan was in turmoil, having endured invasions from East and political instability. The legitimate royal family was scattered, with some members living in exile along the Yo River and among the Mru and Thek tribes in the hills.

== Ascension to the Throne and Reign ==
With military and political support from Anawrahta, king of Pagan (Bagan), Khittathin successfully claimed the throne in the year 380 CE. He established his royal seat at Pyinsa, located near the modern-day Lemro River area.

Khittathin ruled for ten years.

== Death and Succession ==
Khittathin died after ruling for ten years and was succeeded by his younger brother, Sandathin, in 390 ME (1018 CE).

== See also ==
- List of Arakanese monarchs
