= Ba Saw Phyu =

Ba Saw Phyu ဘစောဖြူ

King of Arakan
- Reign: c. January 1459 – 5 August 1482
- Predecessor: Khayi
- Successor: Dawlya
- Born: c. March 1430 (Thursday born); Mrauk-U
- Died: 5 August 1482 (aged 52); Monday, 7th waning of Wagaung 844 ME (Note: Rakhine Razawin Thit (Sandamala Linkara Vol. 2 1999: 24) says he was assassinated on Monday, 7th waning of Wagaung 843 ME which translates to Friday, 17 August 1481. It is clearly a typo since the prior page (Sandamala Linkara Vol. 2 1999: 23) says he was on the front in Chittagong in Natdaw 843 (November 1481). Moreover, the chronicle says he reigned for 23 years; since he came to power in 1459, the correct date should be a year later, 5 August 1482 which was indeed a Monday.); Mrauk-U
- Consort: Saw Nandi; Saw Htin
- Issue: Dawlya (son); Gamani (son); Narapati Sekkya (son); Saw Mi Saw (daughter) another daughter
- Ba Saw Phyu (ဘစောဖြူ); Kalima Shah (ကလမသျှာ)
- House: Saw Mon
- Father: Khayi
- Mother: Saw Pa-Ba
- Religion: Theravada Buddhism

Ba Saw Phyu (Burmese: ဘစောဖြူ, Burmese pronunciation: [ba̰ sɔ́ pʰjù]; also spelled Ba Saw Pru, Arakanese pronunciation: [ba̰ sɔ́ pʰɹù]; 1430–1482) was king of Arakan from 1459 to 1482. He acquired Chittagong in 1459, and put down a rebellion there in 1481. He was also known as Kalima Shah by the neighbouring Bengal. He established religious contacts with Ceylon and built the Mahabodhi Shwe-Gu Temple. Though he was beloved by his subjects for his enlightened rule, the king was assassinated by a servant of his eldest son Dawlya.

== Early life ==
Ba Saw Phyu was born to Prince Khayi and Princess Saw Pa-Ba (စောပဘာ), both of Launggyet royalty in early 1430. (Note: (Sandamala Linkara Vol. 2 1999: 18): His parents were married c. mid-1429, after King Saw Mon had taken over Launggyet in April 1429.) Prince Phyu had a younger brother Ba Saw Nyo and several half-brothers. Although he had an older half-brother, Min Khayi's first son by a commoner wife, Phyu's main rival to the throne was Min Swe, his half-brother whose mother Saw Pyinsa was also of Launggyet royalty and a first cousin of Saw Pa-Ba. According to the Arakanese chronicles, the young prince was athletic as well as an expert archer and marksman. He was later married to Saw Nandi and Saw Htin. He had a son, Dawlya, by Saw Nandi and two sons, Gamani and Narapati Sekkya, by Saw Htin. He also had at least two daughters.

Phyu was chosen as the heir apparent by the king in 1458. Min Swe, then governor of Launggyet, revolted, and came back with a force supplied by the Shan state of Kale (Kalay) in November 1458. However, Mrauk-U forces easily defeated the attack, clearing the way for Ba Saw Phyu as the undisputed heir apparent.

== Reign ==
Soon after the Min Swe rebellion, King Khayi died, and Phyu succeeded the throne at age 29. The new king proved an ambitious king. In the first year of his reign, he took advantage of the turmoil at Sultan Rukunuddin Barbak Shah's court, and seized Chittagong. (Note that the Arakanese chronicles claim that the conquest of Chittagong came nine years earlier in 1450 by King Khayi.) The conquest of Chittagong pointed as much to Arakan's rise as to Bengal's "weakness". After the conquest of Chittagong, Ba Saw Phyu issued a coin bearing the kalima in Persian script "as a token of sovereignty" over Chittagong.

His reign was largely peaceful although rebellions did break out from time to time. In 1461, the lord of Tanlwe revolted. On 23 May 1476 (Thursday, 1st waxing of 1st Waso 838 ME), the Thet people revolted. Both were easily put down but the most serious rebellion came in 1481 when Chittagong revolted. In December 1481 (Natdaw 843), (Note: (Sandamala Linkara Vol. 2 1999: 24): Natdaw 843 ME = 22 November 1481 to 20 December 1481) he marched to Chittagong. The city was taken only after a fierce battle that lasted several days. The control of the city exchanged hands several times but Arakanese forces eventually prevailed. The chronicles report that Ba Saw Phyu chased the rebels deep into Bengal.

The king founded a town called Pyin-htaung in 1463. In 1471, he expanded Mrauk-U city and built new moats and water canals. For religion, he built the Mahabodhi Shwe-Gu Temple, on a hill northwest of the palace. The temple's octagonal plan is attributed to the Le-Mro period. He also established religious contacts with Ceylon, which presented him the Tripiṭaka, Theravada Buddhism's sacred texts.

== Death ==
Though "highly praised by his countrymen" for his enlightened rule, the king was assassinated by a servant of his eldest son Dawlya on 5 August 1482. Dawlya had been unhappy about the king's recent decision to anoint his younger half-brother Gamani as the heir apparent. The king was 52. The patricidal Dawlya succeeded him.

== Bibliography ==
- Gutman, Pamela (2001). Burma's Lost Kingdoms: Splendours of Arakan. Bangkok: Orchid Press. ISBN 974-8304-98-1.
- Harvey, G. E. (1925). History of Burma: From the Earliest Times to 10 March 1824. London: Frank Cass & Co. Ltd.
- Phayre, Lt. Gen. Sir Arthur P. (1883). History of Burma (1967 ed.). London: Susil Gupta.
- Sandamala Linkara, Ashin (1931). Rakhine Yazawinthit Kyan (in Burmese). Vol. 1–2 (1997–1999 ed.). Yangon: Tetlan Sarpay.

Ba Saw Phyu Mrauk-U Kingdom Born: c. March 1430 Died: 5 August 1482
Regnal titles
| Preceded by Khayi | King of Mrauk-U c. January 1459 – 5 August 1482 | Succeeded by Dawlya |
