= Narapawara =

Narapawara နရပဝရကြီး

King of Arakan
- Reign: February 1735 - September 1737
- Coronation: February 1735
- Predecessor: Naradipati II
- Successor: Sanda Wizala
- Born: early 1700s Mrauk U
- Died: 1737; Mrauk U
Names
- Shwehninthakhin Narapawara
- House: Narapawara
- Father: Sanda Thuriya III
- Religion: Therevada Buddhism

Narapawara (Arakanese:နရပဝရ, was a 38th king of the Mrauk-U Dynasty of Arakan.

== Bibliography ==
- Harvey, G. E. (1925). History of Burma: From the Earliest Times to 10 March 1824. London: Frank Cass & Co. Ltd.
- Myat Soe, ed. (1964). Myanma Swezon Kyan (in Burmese). Vol. 9 (1 ed.). Yangon: Sarpay Beikman.
- Myint-U, Thant (2006). The River of Lost Footsteps—Histories of Burma. Farrar, Straus and Giroux. ISBN 978-0-374-16342-6.
- Sandamala Linkara, Ashin (1931). Rakhine Yazawinthit Kyan (in Burmese). Vol. 1–2 (1997 ed.). Yangon: Tetlan Sarpay.
