= Htupayon Pagoda, Mrauk U =

Buddhist stupa

Coordinates: 20°36′11″N 93°11′35″E

Htupayon Pagoda of Mrauk U
- မြောက်‌ဦး ထူပါရုံ ဘုရား

Religion
- Affiliation: Buddhism
- Sect: Theravada Buddhism
- Region: Rakhine State
- Status: active

Location
- Location: Mrauk U, Rakhine State
- Country: Myanmar
- Interactive map of Htupayon Pagoda of Mrauk U

Architecture
- Founder: Min Ran Aung
- Groundbreaking: 1494

The Htupayon Pagoda (Burmese: ထူပါရုံ ဘုရား, Burmese pronunciation: [tʰù bà jòʊ̯ɴ pʰəjá]) is a Buddhist stupa located in Mrauk U, Rakhine State, Myanmar. Construction of the pagoda was commissioned by King Min Ran Aung in 1494. The eight-year-old king likely never saw the completion of the pagoda as he was assassinated by his own ministers just six months into his reign. The pagoda, located in the northern sector of Mrauk-U, was considered auspicious by later Arakanese kings who visited its precincts after the coronation ceremony to take an oath for the well being of the country during their reign.

== Bibliography ==
- Gutman, Pamela (2001). Burma's Lost Kingdoms: Splendours of Arakan. Bangkok: Orchid Press. ISBN 974-8304-98-1.
- Sandamala Linkara, Ashin (1997–1999) [1931]. Rakhine Yazawinthit Kyan (in Burmese). Vol. 1–2. Yangon: Tetlan Sarpay.

20°36'11.24716"N, 93°11'34.61330"E
