= Min Dawlya =

Min Dawlya မင်းဒေါလျာ

King of Arakan
- Reign: 5 August 1482 – c. February 1492
- Predecessor: Ba Saw Phyu
- Successor: Ba Saw Nyo
- Born: c. January 1456; Mrauk-U
- Died: c. February 1492 (aged 36); Mrauk-U/Chittagong Hill Tracts
- Consort: Saw Pan-Phya; Min Pan Hla; Saw Ru Saw; 11 queens in total
- Issue: Ran Aung; Saw Mi Saw; Phwa Saw; Thazata
Names
- Min Dawlya (မင်းဒေါလျာ); Mathu Shah (မောဓုသျှာ)
- House: Saw Mon
- Father: Ba Saw Phyu
- Mother: Saw Nandi
- Religion: Theravada Buddhism

Min Dawlya (Burmese: မင်းဒေါလျာ, Burmese pronunciation: [mɪ́ɴ dɔ́ l̥à], Arakanese pronunciation: [máɴ dɔ́ l̥à]; also known as Mathu Shah; (1456–1492) was king of Arakan, a former state in Myanmar (Burma), from 1482 to 1492.

== Reign ==
He came to power by having his father King Ba Saw Phyu assassinated after his father had chosen another son as his heir apparent. Dawlya proved an able king, however.

== Death ==
He died on the war elephant after having returned from a failed expedition to the Chittagong Hill Tracts.

== Bibliography ==
- Phayre, Lt. Gen. Sir Arthur P. (1883). History of Burma (1967 ed.). London: Susil Gupta.
- Sandamala Linkara, Ashin (1931). Rakhine Yazawinthit Kyan (in Burmese). Vol. 1–2 (1997–1999 ed.). Yangon: Tetlan Sarpay.
- Topich, William J.; Keith A. Leitich (2013). The History of Myanmar. ABC-CLIO. ISBN 9780313357244.

Min Dawlya Mrauk-U Kingdom Born: c. January 1456 Died: c. February 1492
Regnal titles
Preceded by Ba Saw Phyu	King of Mrauk-U; 5 August 1482 – c. February 1492	Succeeded by Ba Saw Nyo
