= Madarit =

Madarit မေတ္တရစ်ရာဇာ

King of Arakan
- Coronation: 28 March 1738 - 6 February 1743
- Predecessor: Sanda Wizala
- Successor: Nara Apaya
- Born: 1718; Mrauk-U
- Died: 6 February 1743 (aged 25); Kaladan River
- Consort: Shwe Yi (ရွှေရည်)
- House: Narapawara
- Religion: Therevada Buddhism

Madarit (Arakanese:မေတ္တရစ်,1718 - 6 January 1743) was a 40th king of the Mrauk-U Dynasty of Arakan, a former state in Myanmar (Burma).

== Bibliography ==
- Harvey, G. E. (1925). History of Burma: From the Earliest Times to 10 March 1824. London: Frank Cass & Co. Ltd.
- Myat Soe, ed. (1964). Myanma Swezon Kyan (in Burmese). Vol. 9 (1 ed.). Yangon: Sarpay Beikman.
- Myint-U, Thant (2006). The River of Lost Footsteps—Histories of Burma. Farrar, Straus and Giroux. ISBN 978-0-374-16342-6.
- Sandamala Linkara, Ashin (1931). Rakhine Yazawinthit Kyan (in Burmese). Vol. 1–2 (1997 ed.). Yangon: Tetlan Sarpay.
