= Min Ran Aung =

Min Ran Aung မင်းရန်အောင်

King of Arakan
- Reign: c. January 1494 – c. July 1494
- Predecessor: Ba Saw Nyo
- Successor: Salingathu
- Born: c. September 1485 (Wednesday born); Mrauk-U
- Died: c. July 1494 (aged 8); Mrauk-U
- Consort: Saw Shin Saw
Names
- Min Ran Aung (မင်းရန်အောင်); Noori Shah (နောရိသျှာ)
- House: Saw Mon
- Father: Dawlya
- Mother: Saw Pan-Phya
- Religion: Theravada Buddhism

Min Ran Aung (Burmese: မင်းရန်အောင်, Burmese pronunciation: [mɪ́ɴ jàɴ ʔàʊɴ]; Arakanese pronunciation: [máɴ ɹàɴ ʔàʊɴ]; 1485–1494) was king of Arakan for six months in 1494. The eldest son of King Dawlya was only 8 when he was put on the throne by the ministers after his granduncle King Ba Saw Nyo's death. The ministers also married the young boy to Saw Shin Saw, daughter of Ba Saw Nyo and his cousin. Still a child, the king had no interest in governing and spent much of the time playing. However, the ministers' belief that they could control the boy king was greatly shaken when the young king on a whim had one of the ministers drowned in a well. Concerned by the erratic behaviour and for their own safety, the remaining ministers beheaded the king and handed the throne to his maternal uncle Salingathu. The king was also referred to as Noori Shah by the neighbouring Bengal.

== Reign ==
During his short reign, the young king commissioned the construction of Htupayon Pagoda in the northern sector of Mrauk-U. The pagoda was considered auspicious by later Mrauk-U kings who visited its precincts after the coronation ceremony to take an oath for the well being of the country during their reign.

== Bibliography ==
- Gutman, Pamela (2001). Burma's Lost Kingdoms: Splendours of Arakan. Bangkok: Orchid Press. ISBN 974-8304-98-1.
- Sandamala Linkara, Ashin (1931). Rakhine Yazawinthit Kyan (in Burmese). Vol. 1–2 (1997–1999 ed.). Yangon: Tetlan Sarpay.

Min Ran Aung Mrauk-U Kingdom Born: c. September 1485 Died: c. July 1494
Regnal titles
Preceded by Ba Saw Nyo	King of Mrauk-U c. January 1494 – c. July 1494	Succeeded by Salingathu
