= Sanda Thuriya III =

Sanda Thuriya III of Mrauk U စန္ဒာသူရိယ

King of Arakan
- Reign: 1731 - 1734
- Coronation: April 1731
- Predecessor: Sanda Wizaya
- Successor: Naradipati II
- Born: 1695/96 CE; Mrauk-U
- Died: 1734 CE (aged 39); Mrauk U
- Consort: Hmauk Taw Ma II
- Issue: Naradipati II
Names
- စန္ဒာသူရိယကြီး ၃
- Religion: Therevada Buddhism

Sanda Thuriya III (Rakhine:စန္ဒာသူရိယ, 1695 - 1734) was a 36th monarch of the Mrauk-U Dynasty of Arakan.

== Bibliography ==
- Harvey, G. E. (1925). History of Burma: From the Earliest Times to 10 March 1824. London: Frank Cass & Co. Ltd.
- Myat Soe, ed. (1964). Myanma Swezon Kyan (in Burmese). Vol. 9 (1 ed.). Yangon: Sarpay Beikman.
- Myint-U, Thant (2006). The River of Lost Footsteps—Histories of Burma. Farrar, Straus and Giroux. ISBN 978-0-374-16342-6.
- Sandamala Linkara, Ashin (1931). Rakhine Yazawinthit Kyan (in Burmese). Vol. 1–2 (1997 ed.). Yangon: Tetlan Sarpay.
