= Ba Saw Nyo =

Ba Saw Nyo ဘစောညို

King of Arakan
- Reign: c. February 1492 – c. January 1494
- Predecessor: Dawlya
- Successor: Ran Aung
- Born: 1435 (Sunday born); Mrauk-U
- Died: c. January 1494 (aged 58); Mrauk-U
- Consort: Saw Nandi; Min Gahna
- Issue: Saw Shin Saw
- Ba Saw Nyo (ဘစောညို); Muhammad Shah (မဟာမောသျှာ)
- House: Saw Mon
- Father: Khayi
- Mother: Saw Pa-Ba
- Religion: Theravada Buddhism

Ba Saw Nyo (Burmese: ဘစောညို, pronounced [ba̰ sɔ́ ɲò]; 1435–1494) was king of Arakan from 1492 to 1494. The king is known for erecting a small stupa called Radanar Hmankin in 1492. The king was also referred to as Muhammad Shah by the neighbouring Bengal.

== Reign ==
Ba Saw Nyo came to power in 1492 after his nephew King Dawlya had died after a failed military expedition. He made Dawlya's mother and his sister-in-law Saw Nandi his chief queen. He faced a serious mutiny by an officer, which was put down.

== Death ==
Ba Saw Nyo died later in case of assassination by a rebellious soldier named Nga-Swe, whose limbs and legs were cut off and send off with a raft.

== Bibliography ==
- Sandamala Linkara, Ashin (1931). Rakhine Yazawinthit Kyan (in Burmese). Vol. 1–2 (1997–1999 ed.). Yangon: Tetlan Sarpay.

Ba Saw Nyo Mrauk-U Kingdom Born: 1435 Died: c. January 1494
Regnal titles
Preceded by Dawlya	King of Mrauk-U c. February 1492 – c. January 1494	Succeeded by Ran Aung
