= Pyinsa =

Pyinsa ပဉ္စာမြို့
- Country: Burma
- State: Rakhine State
- Founded: 818
- Time zone: UTC+6.30 (MST)

Pyinsa (Burmese: ပဉ္စာမြို့, pronounced [pjɪ̀ɴ sà mjo̰]) is a former capital of Arakan from 818 to 1118. The former capital site is located north of Mrauk U, Rakhine State, Myanmar.

== History ==
The city was founded by Khittatin in 818 AD. After capital of Waithali was devastated by Pyu Invasion.

== Bibliography ==
- Harvey, G. E. (1925). History of Burma: From the Earliest Times to 10 March 1824. London: Frank Cass & Co. Ltd.

Pyinsa
Preceded by Kharit	Capital of Arakan; 1180–1237	Succeeded by Launggyet
Preceded by Waithali	Capital of Arakan; 1018–1118	Succeeded by Parein
