= Waithali =

Former royal capital in Rakhine State, Myanmar

Waithali ဝေသာလီမြို့
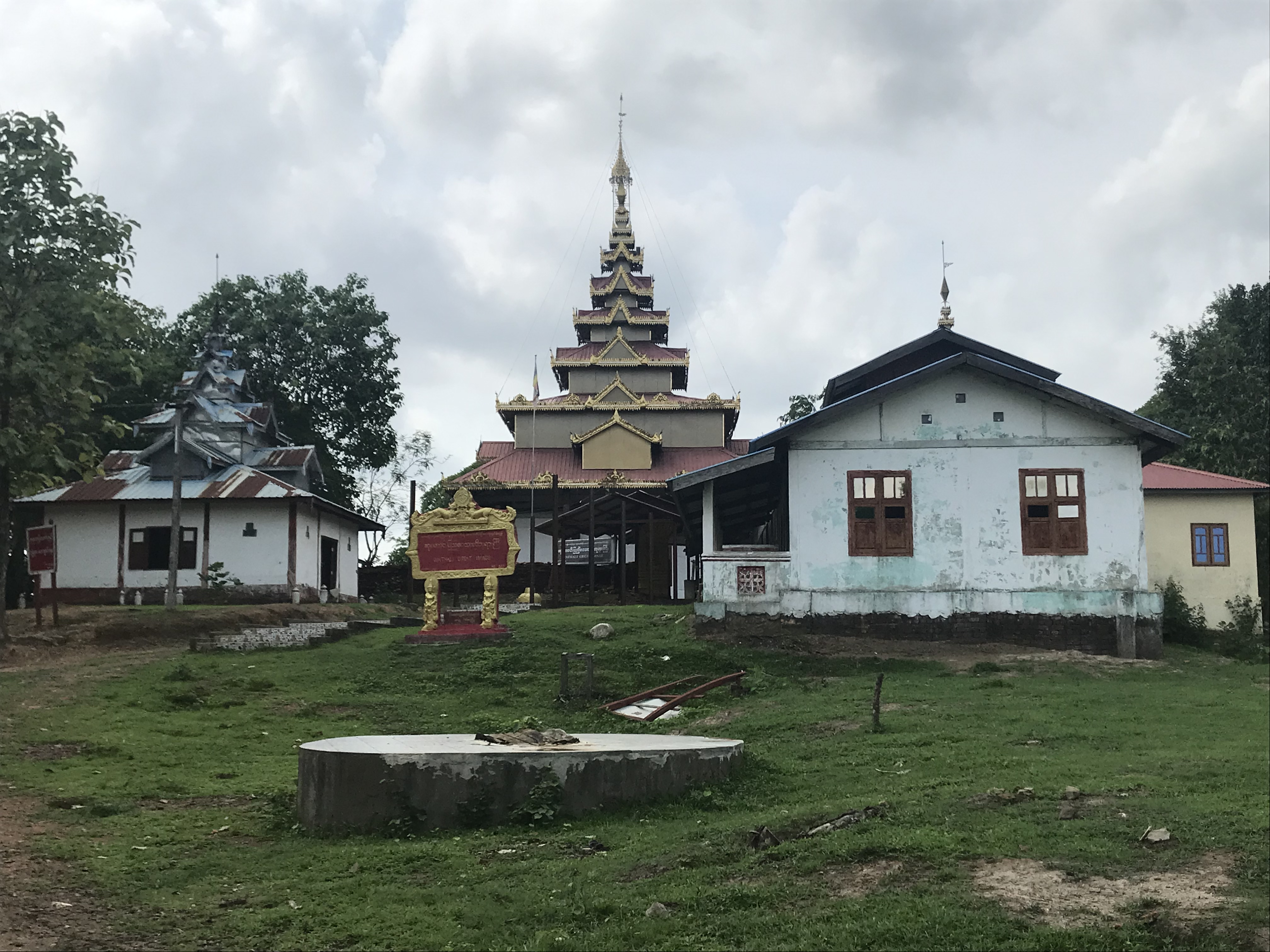
- Waithali town in Mrauk U district

- Location in Burma
- Coordinates: 20°39′46.03″N 93°9′0.82″E
- Country: Burma
- Division: Rakhine State
- Township: Mrauk-U Township
- Time zone: UTC6:30 (MST)

Waithali (Burmese: ဝေသာလီမြို့, pronounced [wèθàlì mjo̰], Pali: Vesālī) located in today's northern Rakhine State, Myanmar, was the capital of the Waithali Kingdom from 370 to 818.

== Etymology ==
Waithali is the Burmese language pronunciation of the Pali word Vesali (vesālī).

== History ==
It has been estimated that the centre of power of the Arakanese world shifted from Dhanyawadi to Waithali in the 4th century AD as Dhanyawadi Kingdom ended in 370 AD. Although it was established later than Dhanyawadi, Waithali Kingdom is the most Indianized of the four Arakanese kingdoms to emerge. Like all of the Arakanese Kingdoms to emerge, the Kingdom of Waithali was based on trade between the East (Pyu city-states, China, the Mons), and the West (India, Bengal, and Persia). The kingdom flourished off of China-India maritime routes. Waithali was a famed trade port with thousands of ships coming annually at its height. The city was built on the banks of a tidal creek and was enclosed by brick walls. The layout of the city had significant Hindu and Indian influence.

According to the Anandachandra Inscription, carved in 729 AD, the subjects of the Waithali Kingdom practiced Mahayana Buddhism, and proclaims that the ruling dynasty of the kingdom were descendants of the Hindu god, Shiva. Dr. E. H. Johnston's analysis reveals a list of kings which he considered reliable beginning from a king named Bahubali. The western face inscription has 72 lines of text recorded in 51 verses describing the Anandachandra's predecessor rulers. Each face recorded the name and ruling period of each king who were believed to have ruled over the land before Anandachandra. The Sanskrit text of the inscription remains unique in Myanmar, as Sanskrit was not widely used outside Arakan. The inscription further alludes to political connections with Sri Lanka and Andhra in regard to religious connections.

The first ruler of the Waithali Kingdom was Bahubali. Many years after his reign, a dynasty was established in Waithali, which was known as Annaveta dynasty. They were followed by an anonymous dynasty, which ruled till 370 AD. In 370 AD, the last ruler of this anonymous dynasty, known as Lanki, was defeated by a chieftain named Dvenchandra (or Mahataing Chandra), who established a dynasty named Chandra dynasty, so called because of their usage of the god Chandra on Waithali coins. The Waithali period is many as the beginning of Arakanese coinage - which was almost a millennium earlier than that of the Burmese. On the reverse of the coins, the Srivatsa (Rakhine: Thiriwutsa), while the obverse bears a bull, the emblem of the Chandra dynasty, under which the name of the King is inscribed in Sanskrit. The motifs used were in the Brahmanical traditional and included the bell, votive flowers, the trishula among others. The art style of the coins have many parallels to the Gupta art style. Motifs found on the coins were also found throughout late 1st millennium coins from nearby neighbors, including in Chittagong, Dvaravati and Champa.

There is some disagreement between different writers about the last ruler of the Chandra dynasty. According to some writers, the last king of Chandra dynasty was Dharmasura, who was defeated by a chieftain named Vajrasakti. Vajrasakti established the Dharmaraja-andaja dynasty (or Dev-andaja or Deva dynasty). Anandachandra (the same king who had made the Anandachandra Inscription) was the grandson of Vajrasakti. While some other writers believe that the last four rulers mentioned in the Anandachandra Inscription indeed belonged to the Chandra dynasty (including Anandachandra himself).

Flag of Rakhine State, showing Srivatsa

Some important and badly damaged life-size Buddha images were recovered from Letkhat-Taung, a hill east of the old palace compound. These statues are invaluable in helping to understand the Waithalian architecture, and also the extent of Hindu influence in the kingdom.

According to local legend, Shwe-taung-gyi (lit. 'Great Golden Hill'), a hill north-east of the palace compound may be a burial place of a 10th-century Pyu king.

The Kingdom eventually declined in the 10th century, with Rakhine's political core moving to the Le-mro valley states at the same time as the rise of the Bagan Kingdom in central Myanmar. Some historians conclude that the decline was from a takeover or from the immigration of the Mranma (Bamar people) in the 10th century.

== Location ==
It is under the Mrauk-U township. The Waithali site is approximately 70 kilometres (43 mi) north-east of Sittwe, and east of Ram Chaung, a tributary of the Kaladan river. Like much of northern Rakhine State, Waithali is in a hilly locale. Like its predecessor, Dhanyawadi, the former capital site has fallen into ruin and much of it is now deserted. Only a few temples and traces of the old city wall remain. The site is about an hour's bus ride from Mrauk U.

== See also ==
- Rakhine State
- Dhanyawadi
- Mrauk U
- Launggyet Dynasty

== External sources ==
- The Land of the Great Image – Being Experiences of Friar Manrique in Arakan by Maurice Collis
