= Lemro River =

River in Chin and Rakhine States, Myanmar

Coordinates: 20°8′51″N 93°3′12″E

Lémro River လေးမြို့မြစ်
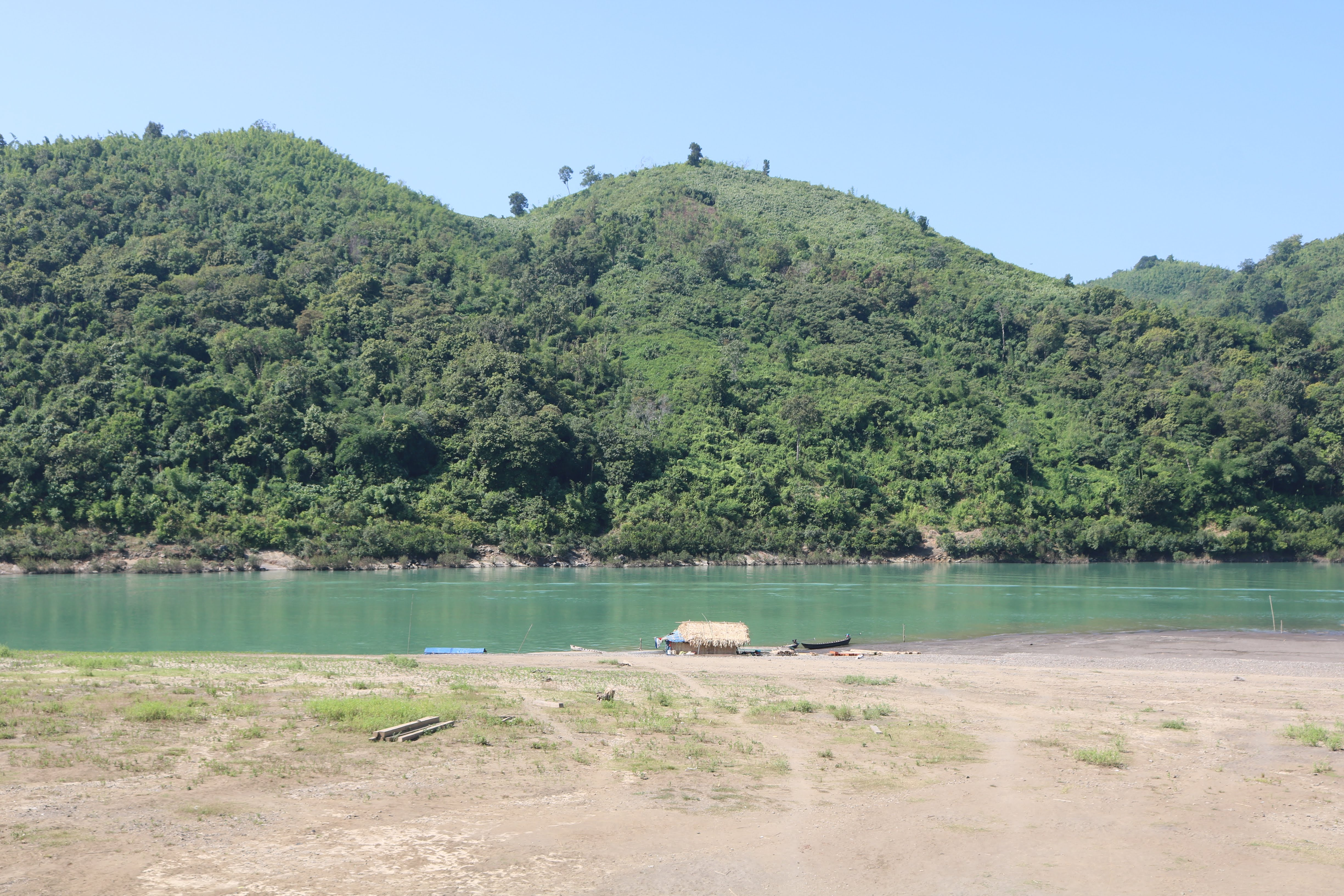

Location
- Country: Myanmar

Physical characteristics
- Mouth
  - location: Bay of Bengal
  - elevation: 0 m (0 ft)
- Length: 183.5 km (114.0 mi)

Basin features
- Cities: Mrauk U, Minbya, Pauktaw, Myebon, Sittwe, Paletwa

The Lemro or Lemyo (Burmese: လေးမြို့မြစ်, Burmese pronunciation: [lémjo̰ mjɪʔ]), also written as Laymro, is a river of Myanmar flowing through Chin State and Rakhine State. It flows into the Bay of Bengal east of Sittwe. The name of the river was given after establishment of four kingdom cities of Arakanese people between the eight and thirteen centuries along the river bank. The Lemro valley is noted for its rock art from these settlers.

== Etymology ==
In the term "Lemro," the first part "Le" or "Lay" refers to the number four and the second part "Mro" refers to town or city. Lay Mro in the Rakhine language means "four cities," which refers to the four ancient Arakanese cities that flourished by the side of the river, since called "Laymyo" or "Lemyo" instead of Lemro.

== Physiography ==
Lémro river originates from the mountains and hills of Chin Hills Track in Chin State of Burma in Matupi Township of Mindat District in Chin State. It flows through Mrauk-U, Minbya and Pauktaw townships of Sittwe District of Rakhine State. It empties into the Kaladan River downstream of Pauktaw. The section from Sittwe to Pauktaw is 16 miles (26 km) long and from Sittwe to Minbya is 40 miles (64 km) long.

=== Hydropower projects ===
Two hydropower projects, "Laymro" 600-megawatt and "Laymro 2" 90-megawatt, are being implemented by Hydropower Planning Department under the Ministry of Electric Power No. 1, China Datang Overseas Investment Co Ltd (CDOI) and Shwe Taung Hydropower Co Ltd starting from on 18 January 2011.
