= Dhanyawadi =

Early historic Buddhist kingdom in Northern Rakhine

- (legendarily) 34th century BCE but more likely existed as a historical state between the 4th and 6th centuries CE–327 CE
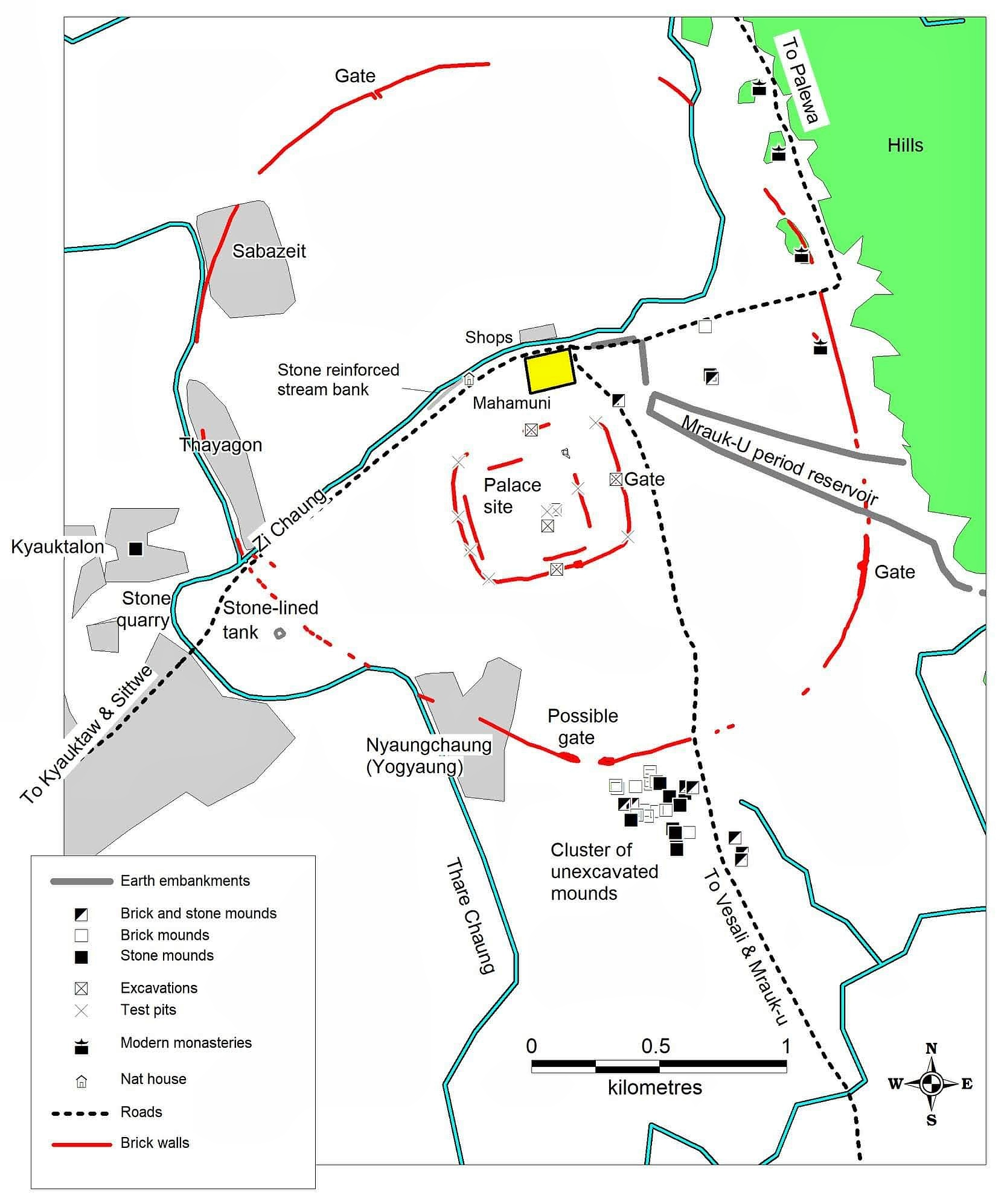
- Capital: Dhanyawadi; 20°52′07.9″N 93°3′50.3″E
- Common languages: Sanskrit, Pali, possibly local Prakrits
- Religion: Mahayana Buddhism, Hinduism, Tantric Buddhism, Vedic Hinduism
- Government: Monarchy
  - 2666 BC - 2604 BC: Marayu (first)
  - 746–788: Thuriya Ketu (last)
- History
  - Established: (legendarily) 34th century BCE but more likely existed as a historical state between the 4th and 6th centuries CE
  - Disestablished: 327 CE
Succeeded by
Waithali Kingdom
- Today part of: Myanmar

Dhanyawaddy (Burmese: ဓညဝတီ; Pali: Dhaññavatī) was the capital of the first Arakan Kingdom, located in what is now Northern Rakhine State, Myanmar. The name is a corruption of the Pali word Dhannavati, which means "large area or rice cultivation or the rice bowl". Like many of its successors, the Kingdom of Dhanyawadi was based on trade between the East (pre-Pagan Myanmar, Pyu, China, the Mons), and the West (Indian subcontinent).

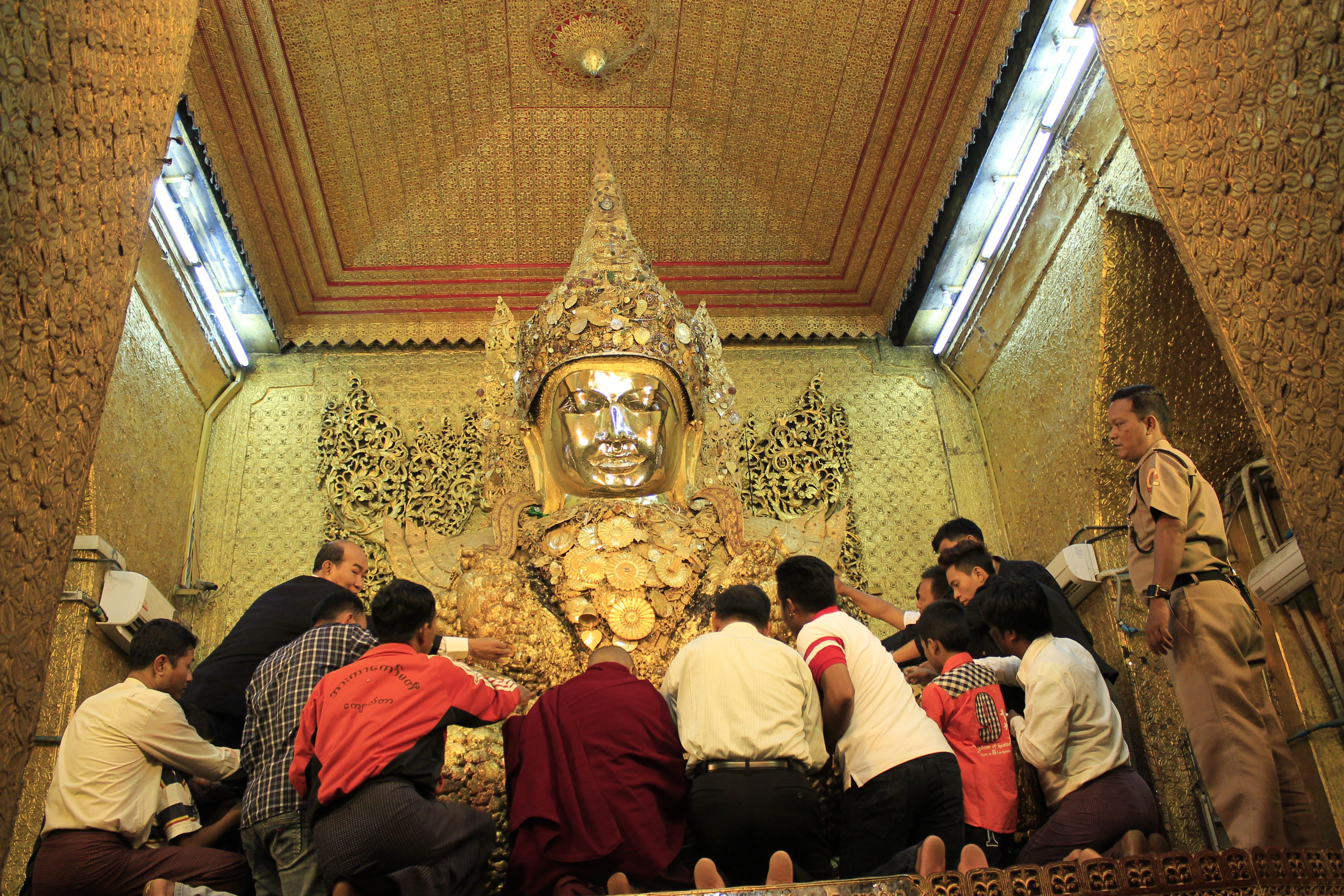
Mahamuni Buddha shrine which is now in Mandalay, Myanmar

The ancient city of Dhanyawaddy is located 6 miles east of Kyauktaw, Rakhine State, on the right side of the Thay Chaung River at the intersection of latitude 20°52'07.2" north and longitude 93°03'49.9" east.

Arakanese legends claim that a Sakya clan of Buddha are founder of Dhanyawadi Kingdom. Now they are mixed with Rakhine people.

== History ==
It was one of the most Indianized of the four Arakanese kingdoms to emerge. Although local legend and folklore claim that the Kingdom of Dhanyawadi existed before the time of the Buddha (before 6th century BCE), most archaeological evidence points to a period between the 4th and the 6th century CE, or, alternatively, the 1st century CE.

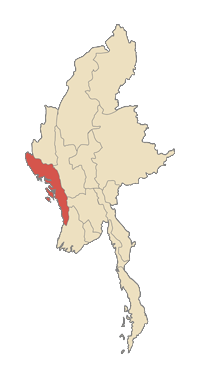

According to historical records, this kingdom city was initially founded by King Marayu. After the collapse of the Marayu, a ruler named Kanyaza Gyi arrived and reestablished the city. Kanyaza's successor, King Sandathuriya, renovated the city. During his reign, the Buddha visited and consecrated the Mahamuni Buddha image.

=== Claims ===
Most Arakanese chronicles claim and agree that Buddhism, which emerged during the reign of King Sanda Suriya, who dedicated the revered Maha Muni Image in B.C. 554, became the central faith in Arakan. Ancient Arakanese legends provide detailed accounts of King Sanda Suriya, who established the great Maha Muni shrine when Lord Buddha visited Arakan in 123 Bowdaw Inzana Era, 25 years before his Mahaparinibbana.

During his visit, the Buddha allowed King Sanda Suriya to craft a life-sized image of himself. The Buddha blessed the site atop Thelagiri Hill, located to the east of Kyauktaw on the banks of the Kaladan River. Upon departing, the Buddha left one of his sacred teeth, which emitted brilliant rays of light in all directions, and entrusted it to the Venerable Ananda, his beloved cousin. The Buddha proclaimed:

"Dhanyawaddy is a great and splendid country, destined to have ninety-nine towns on the eastern bank of the Gacchapanadi River and ninety-nine towns on its western bank. Its kings shall remain of the ancient Kshatriya lineage, particularly descended from our Sakya race, originating from Ajjuna, the hermit-king of Kapilavastu. As a Bodhisattva, I was reborn many times in this noble land. In this country, my image shall be created and preserved for 5000 years during the life of my Sasana (Buddhism)."

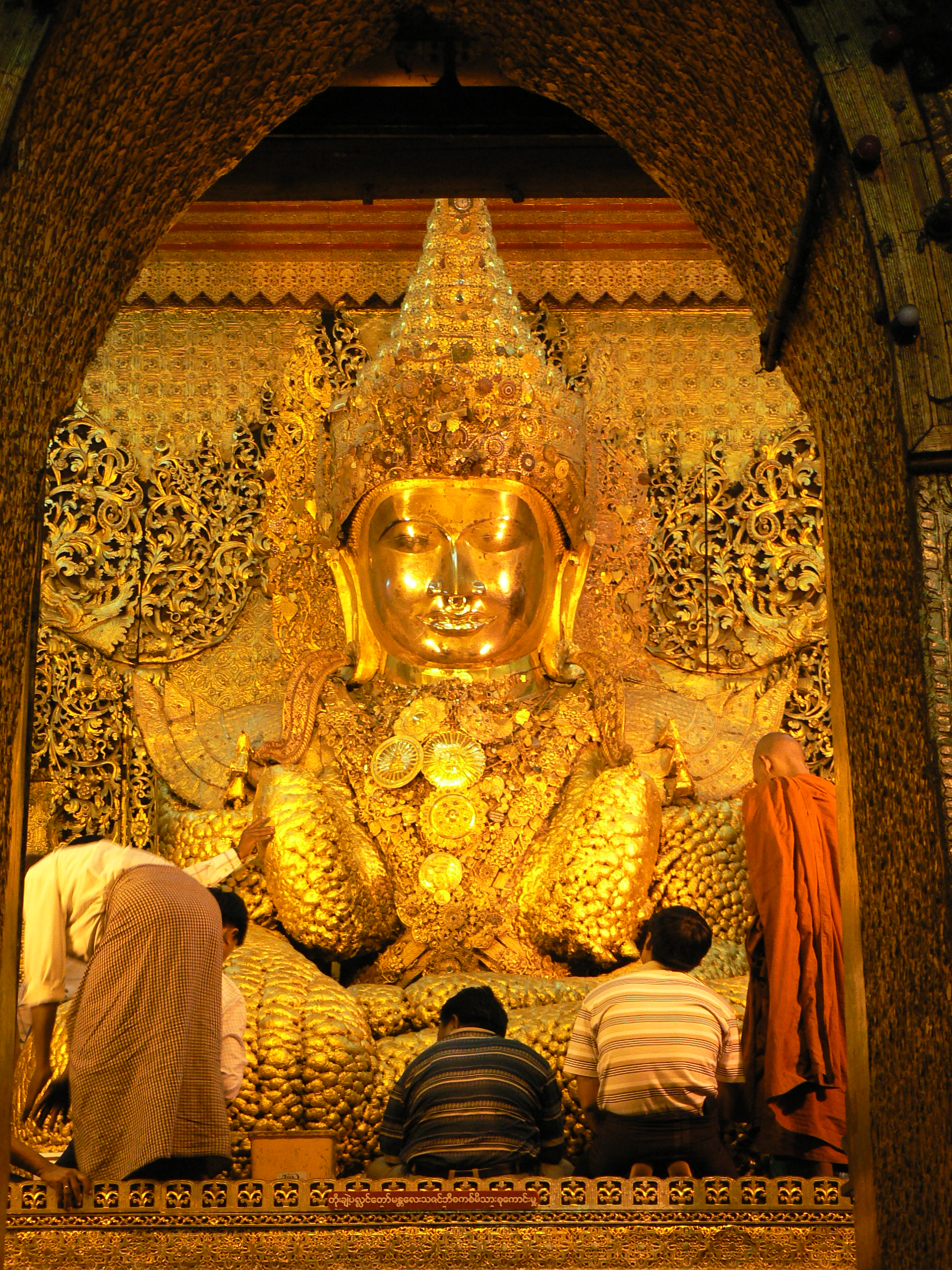
Mahamuni Buddha Statue which originally came from Arakan during the time of Dhanyawadi

The Arakanese proudly claim to be the first people outside India to have heard the Buddha’s teachings directly from his lips. When the Maha Muni image was completed, it was enshrined on Thiriguta Hill, amidst celebrations where gods and men freely mingled to worship the great image of Maha Muni.

== Mahamuni Buddha ==
The most prominent Buddhist site is the Mahamuni Shrine. According to local legend, the Buddha visited Dhanyawadi during his life. In Dhanyawadi, the noblemen and the affluent donated their wealth and possessions (mainly gold and silver), to be melted and cast into an image of the Buddha. The Buddha is said to have provided seven drops of his sweat, taken from his chest, and the drops were added to the molten metals. This allowed the Mahamuni Image, once cast, to be able to preach the Dhamma. When Arakan fell to the Burmese in 1785, the Burmese tried to take away the statue back to Amarapura – then, their royal capital. But, here, Burmese and Arakanese sources diverge. The Arakanese claim that Buddha image disappeared – either from the temple, or when the Burmese tried to load it onto an awaiting barge at Thare Chaung. The Burmese, on the other hand, claim that they transported the Maha Muni back to their capital (which was then moved later to Mandalay). But some Burmese academics are now supporting the fact that the Maha Muni never left Rakhine state.

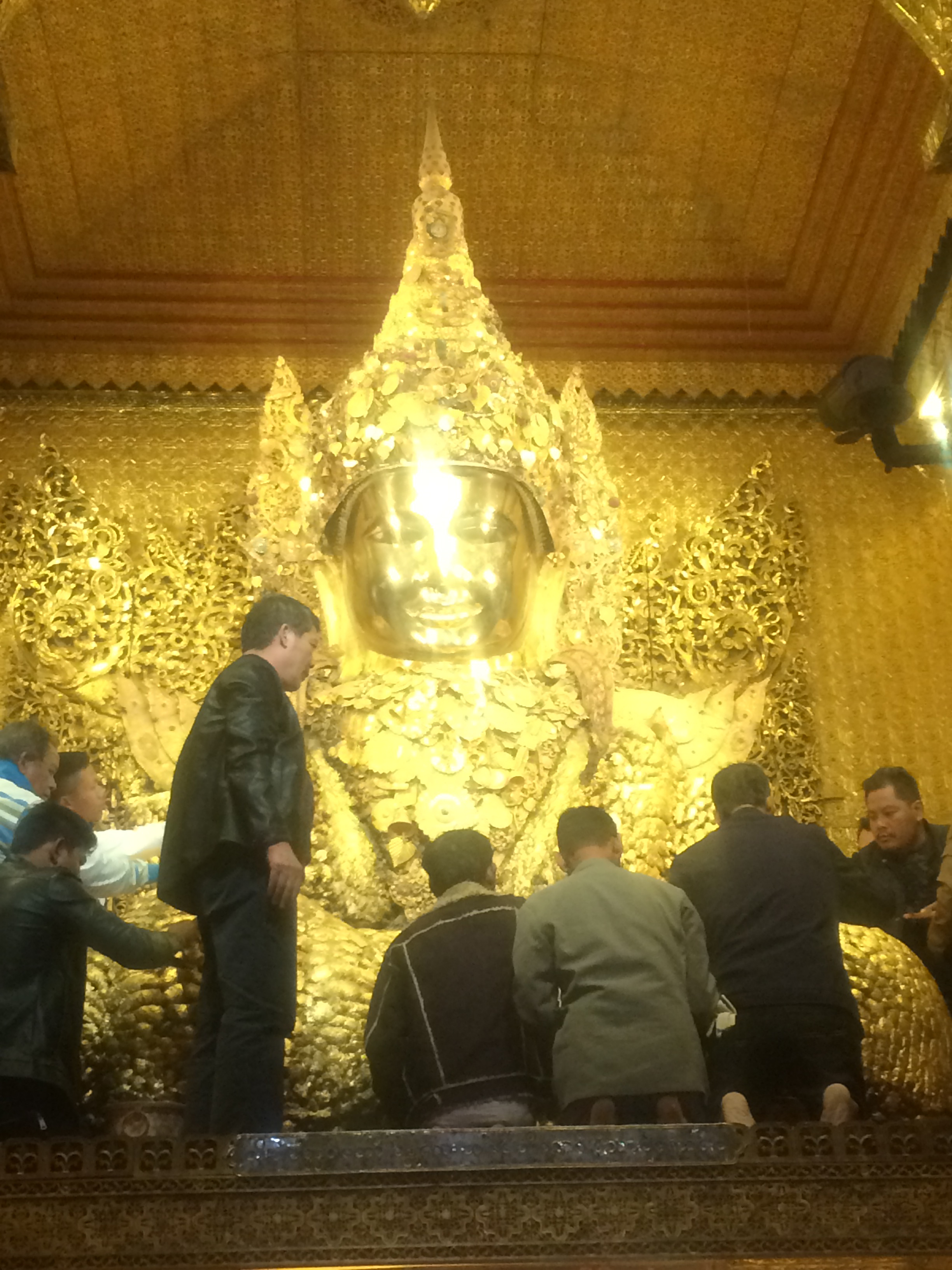
The Mahamuni shrine

== Society ==
Dhanyawadi, meaning "grain-blessed" in Pali, was a significant city whose culture was influenced by India but also shared common traits with other Southeast Asian regions connected through maritime trade, like the Pyu polities of Burma and the Mon of Thailand and Vietnam.

The city had fertile land for rice cultivation and traded goods like beeswax and stick-lac from local hill tribes. Its location along the Tharechaung River allowed for trade with China, India, and Europe, especially after disruptions to overland routes. This brought Arakan into broader trade networks and introduced Indian cultural and religious ideas.

== Dhanyawadi Site ==
Dhanyawaddy
- Location in Myanmar
- Coordinates: 20°52′07.9″N 93°3′50.3″E
- Country: Myanmar
- Division: Rakhine State

The site is approximately 180 miles (290 km) north by north east of Sittwe, and lies between the Kaladan River and Thare Chaung (Thare Stream). Like much of Northern Rakhine State, it is in a hilly locale. Much of it is now deserted, with the only signs of civilisation being the stalls around the Mahamuni and meditation centres, opened to cater to the influx of pilgrims to the Mahamuni shrine (not the Mahamuni Image).

The site can be reached by a one and a half to two hours bus ride from Mrauk U. Up until the mid-1950s, Dhanyawadi could also be reached by boat from the Thare Chaung, but pollution and silting has almost blocked the canal leading to the site. Its city walls were made of brick, and form an irregular circle with a perimeter of about 9.6 kilometres (6.0 mi), enclosing an area of about 4.42 square kilometres (1.71 sq mi). Remains of the city wall, and the palace compound are still visible. Beyond the walls, the remains of a wide moat, now silted over and covered by paddy fields, are still visible in places. The remains of brick fortifications can be seen along the hilly ridge which provided protection from the west. Within the city, a similar wall and moat enclose the palace site, which has an area of 0.26 square kilometres (0.10 sq mi), and another wall surrounds the palace itself. Aerial photographs indicate that Dhanyawadi's irrigation channels and storage tanks were centred at the palace site.

== Notable kings ==
The first king of Dhanyawaddy is Marayu.

Marayu is the first King of Arakan and founding father of Arakanese Nation ruled from 2666–2604. The First Dhanyawaddy lasted from 2666–825 BCE, Second Dhanyawaddy from 825 BCE–146 CE and Third Dhanyawaddy from 146–788.

One of the most notable king is Kanraza Gyi who was a Hindu and being born in Tagaung during the 861 BC. He established the Second Dhanyawadi Kingdom of Arakan. He married Queen Thubbada Dewi of Dhanyawadi, and his descendants became known as the Rakhine or Arakanese people according to the arakanese chronicles. Kanraza Gyi ruled for 37 years before being succeeded by his son, Thila Raza.

King Sanda Thuriya is respected and notable among the Rakhine people for casting of great Mahamuni Buddha. The king is known to embraced Buddhism with his people and asked Lord Buddha to leave an image of Himself, leading to the creation of the Mahamuni image.

== See also ==
- Rakhine State
- Waithali
- Mrauk U
- Waithali Kingdom
- Launggyet Dynasty
