= History of Rakhine =

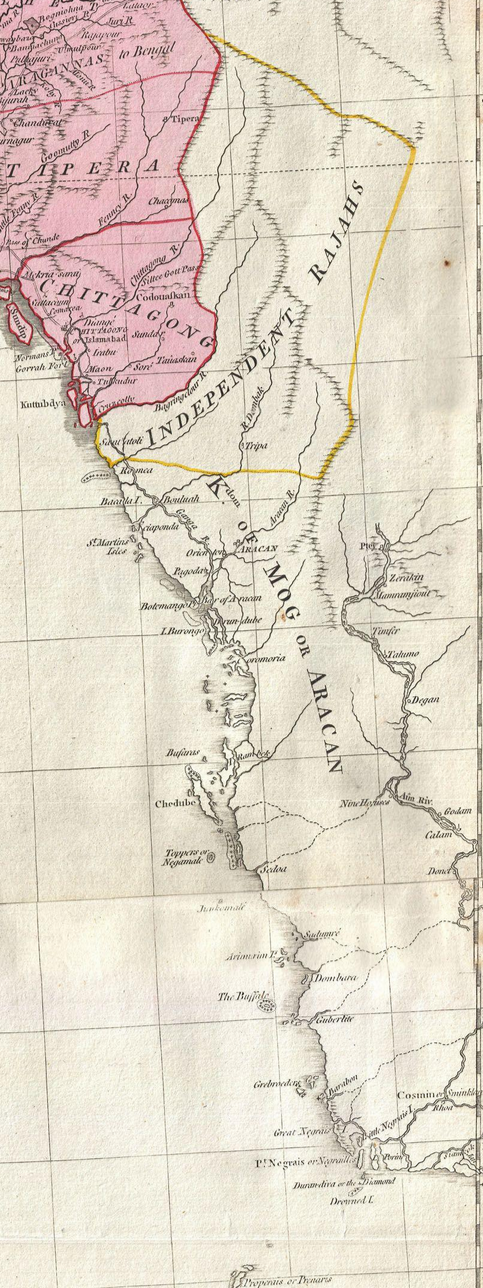
Kingdom of Arakan

Rakhine State occupies the western coastline of Myanmar up to the border with Bangladesh and corresponds to the historical Kingdom of Arakan. The history of Rakhine is divided into 7 parts – the independent kingdoms of Dhanyawadi, Waithali, Lemro, Mrauk U, Burmese occupation from 1785 to 1826, British rule from 1826 to 1948 and as a part of independent Burma from 1948. From the first millennium AD, Arakan was a frontier region between India and Southeast Asia that could be accessed both by land and sea.

The Arakanese kingdom of Mrauk-U was conquered on 31 December 1784, by the Burmese Konbaung dynasty. In 1826, Arakan was ceded to the British as war reparation after the First Anglo-Burmese War. It became part of the province of Burma of British India in 1886, after the annexation of Burma by the British. Arakan became part of the Crown Colony of British Burma which was split off from British India in 1937. Northern Rakhine state became a contested battleground throughout the Japanese occupation of Burma. After 1948, Rakhine became part of the newly independent state of Burma. In 1973, Arakan became a state of the Socialist Republic of the Union of Burma, designated as the homeland of the Rakhine people.

Sporadic communal strife has plagued Arakan since colonial times, between the majority Arakanese who are Buddhist, and Muslim communities, many but not all of whom came into Arakan with British rule. Widespread rioting occurred in June and October 2012.

The history of ancient Arakanese Kingdoms can be traced through the Arakanese chronicles preserved.

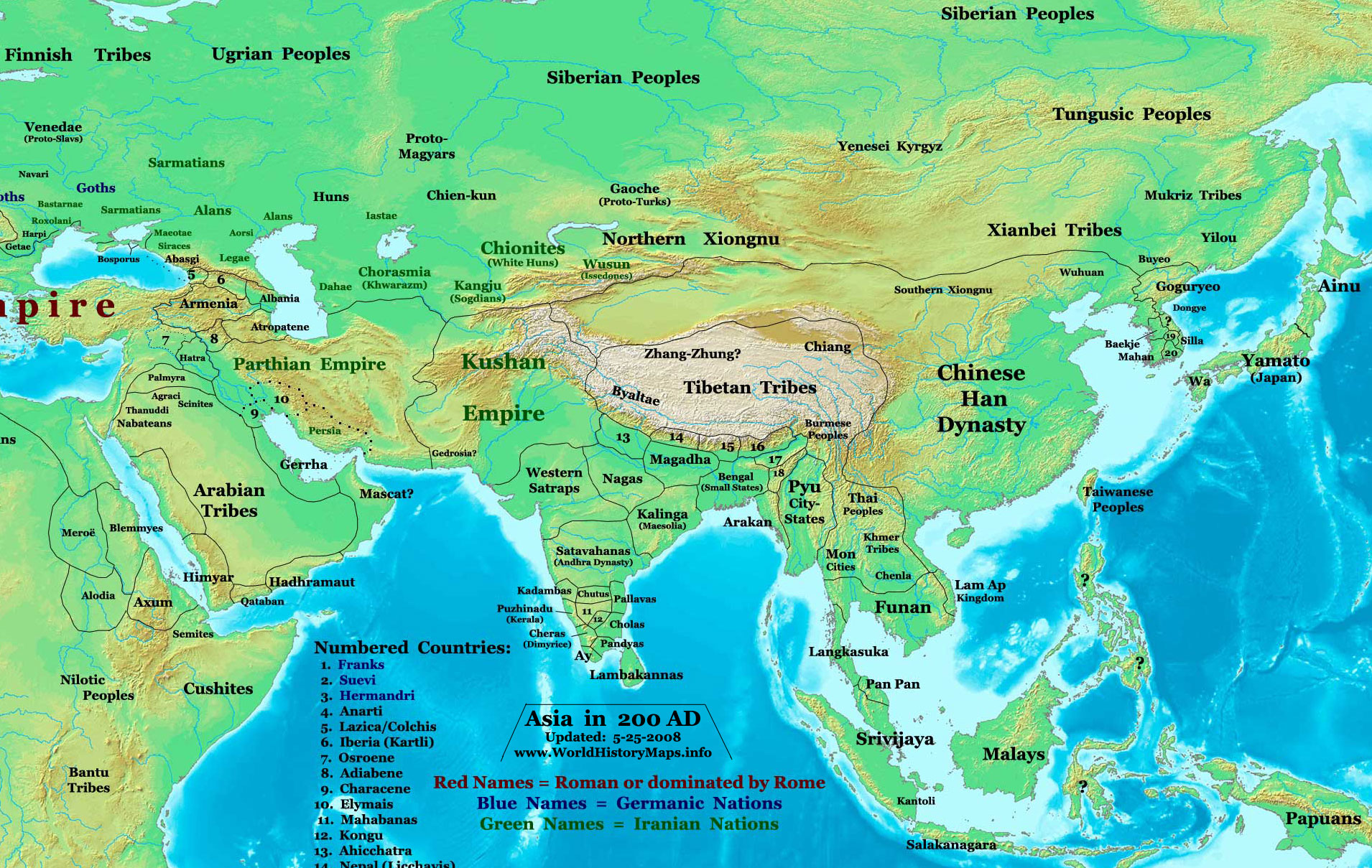
Map showing Arakan as a neighbor to the kingdoms of the Ganges delta in 200 CE

== Dhanyawadi ==
Arakanese legends claim that the history of the Arakanese people began in Rakhine although archaeological evidence supporting this claim is unavailable. Earliest recording evidence suggests the civilization founded around the 4th century CE. "The presently dominant Rakhine are a Tibeto-Burman race, the last group of people to enter Arakan during 10th century and on." Various Arakanese kingdoms stretched from the Ganges Delta to Cape Negrais on the Irrawaddy Delta.

Ancient Dhanyawadi lies west of the mountain ridge between the Kaladan and Le-mro rivers. Dhannyawadi could be reached by small boat from the Kaladan via its tributary, the Tharechaung. Its city walls were made of brick, and form an irregular circle with a perimeter of about 9.6 kilometres (6.0 miles), enclosing an area of about 4.42 km^{2} (1,090 acres). Beyond the walls, the remains of a wide moat, now silted over and covered by paddy fields, are still visible in places. The remains of brick fortifications can be seen along the hilly ridge which provided protection from the west. Within the city, a similar wall and moat enclose the palace site, which has an area of 26 hectares (64 acres), and another wall surrounds the palace itself.

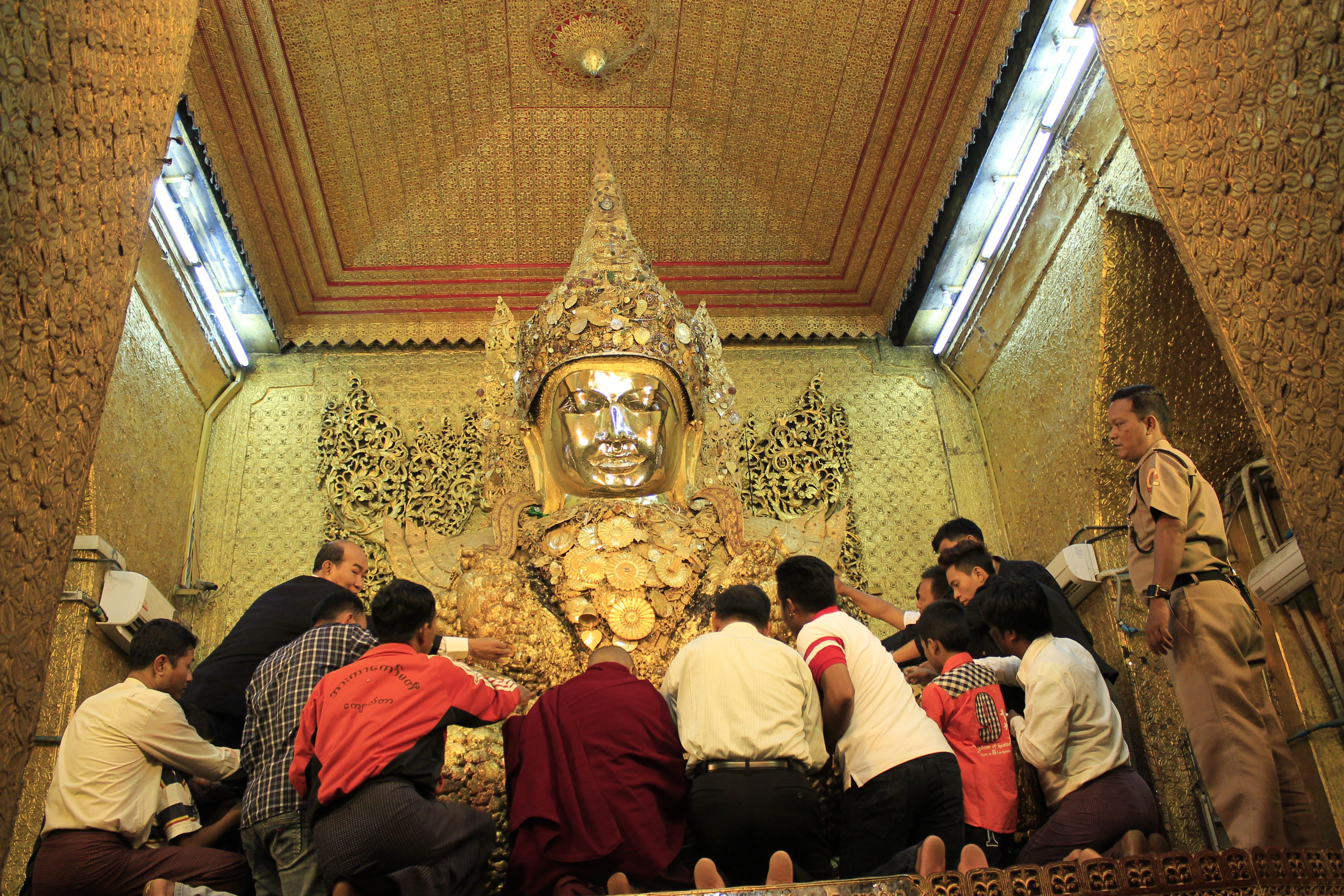
Mahamuni Buddha shrine which organically came from Arakan

At times of insecurity, when the city was subject to raids from the hill tribes or attempted invasions from neighbouring powers, there would have been an assured food supply enabling the population to withstand a siege. The city would have controlled the valley and the lower ridges, supporting a mixed wet-rice and taungya (slash and burn) economy, with local chiefs paying allegiance to the king.

From aerial photographs we can discern Dhannyawadi's irrigation channels and storage tanks, centred at the palace site. Throughout the history of Rakhine, and indeed the rest of early Southeast Asia, the king's power stemmed from his control of irrigation and water storage systems to conserve the monsoon rains and therefore to maintain the fertility and prosperity of the land. In ceremonies conducted by Indian Brahmins the king was given the magic power to regulate the celestial and terrestrial forces to control the coming of the rains which would ensure the continuing prosperity of the kingdom.

== Vesali (Waithali) ==
It has been estimated that the centre of power of the Arakanese world shifted from Dhanyawadi to Waithali in the 4th century AD as Dhanyawadi Kingdom ended in 370 CE. Although it was established later than Dhanyawadi, Waithali is the most Indianized of the four Arakanese kingdoms to emerge. Like all of the Arakanese Kingdoms to emerge, the Kingdom of Waithali was based on trade between the East (Pyu city-states, China, the Mons), and the West (India, Bengal, and Persia). The kingdom flourished off of China-India maritime routes. Waithali was a famed trade port with thousands of ships coming annually at its height. The city was built on the banks of a tidal creek and was enclosed by brick walls. The layout of the city had significant Hindu and Indian influence.

According to the Anandachandra Inscription, carved in 729 CE, the subjects of the Waithali Kingdom practiced Mahayana Buddhism, and proclaims that the ruling dynasty of the kingdom were descendants of the Hindu god, Shiva. Dr. E. H. Johnston's analysis reveals a list of kings which he considered reliable beginning from a king named Bahubali. The western face inscription has 72 lines of text recorded in 51 verses describing the Anandachandra's predecessor rulers. Each face recorded the name and ruling period of each king who were believed to have ruled over the land before Anandachandra. The Sanskrit text of the inscription remains unique in Myanmar, as Sanskrit was not widely used outside Arakan. The inscription further alludes to political connections with Sri Lanka and Andhra in regard to religious connections.

The first ruler of the Waithali Kingdom was Bahubali. Many years after his reign, a dynasty was established in Waithali, which was known as Annaveta dynasty. They were followed by an anonymous dynasty, which ruled till 370 CE. In 370 CE, the last ruler of this anonymous dynasty, known as Lanki, was defeated by a chieftain named Dvenchandra (or Mahataing Chandra), who established a dynasty named Chandra dynasty, so called because of their usage of the god Chandra on Waithali coins. The Waithali period is many as the beginning of Arakanese coinage – which was almost a millennium earlier than that of the Burmese. On the reverse of the coins, the Srivatsa (Rakhine: Thiriwutsa), while the obverse bears a bull, the emblem of the Chandra dynasty, under which the name of the King is inscribed in Sanskrit. The motifs used were in the Brahmanical traditional and included the bell, votive flowers, the trishula among others. The art style of the coins have many parallels to the Gupta art style. Motifs found on the coins were also found throughout late 1st millennium coins from nearby neighbors, including in Chittagong, Dvaravati and Champa.

There is some disagreement between different writers about the last ruler of the Chandra dynasty. According to some writers, the last king of Chandra dynasty was Dharmasura, who was defeated by a chieftain named Vajrasakti. Vajrasakti established the Dharmaraja-andaja dynasty (or Dev-andaja or Deva dynasty). Anandachandra (the same king who had made the Anandachandra Inscription) was the grandson of Vajrasakti. While some other writers believe that the last four rulers mentioned in the Anandachandra Inscription indeed belonged to the Chandra dynasty (including Anandachandra himself).

Flag of Rakhine State, showing Srivatsa

Some important and badly damaged life-size Buddha images were recovered from Letkhat-Taung, a hill east of the old palace compound. These statues are invaluable in helping to understand the Waithalian architecture, and also the extent of Hindu influence in the kingdom.

According to local legend, Shwe-taung-gyi (lit. 'Great Golden Hill'), a hill north-east of the palace compound may be a burial place of a 10th-century Pyu king.

The Kingdom eventually declined in the 10th century, with Rakhine's political core moving to the Le-mro valley states at the same time as the rise of the Bagan Kingdom in central Myanmar. Some historians conclude that the decline was from a takeover or from the immigration of the Mranma (Bamar people) in the 10th century.

== Le-Mro ==
Le-Mro in the Rakhine language means "four cities," which refers to the four ancient Rakhine cities that flourished by the side of the Lemro River. Now Only some remain of that cities in Lemro River. One of the most famous kings that ruled during this period was King Min Hti who ruled the Launggyet Dynasty from ruled from 1279 to 1385.

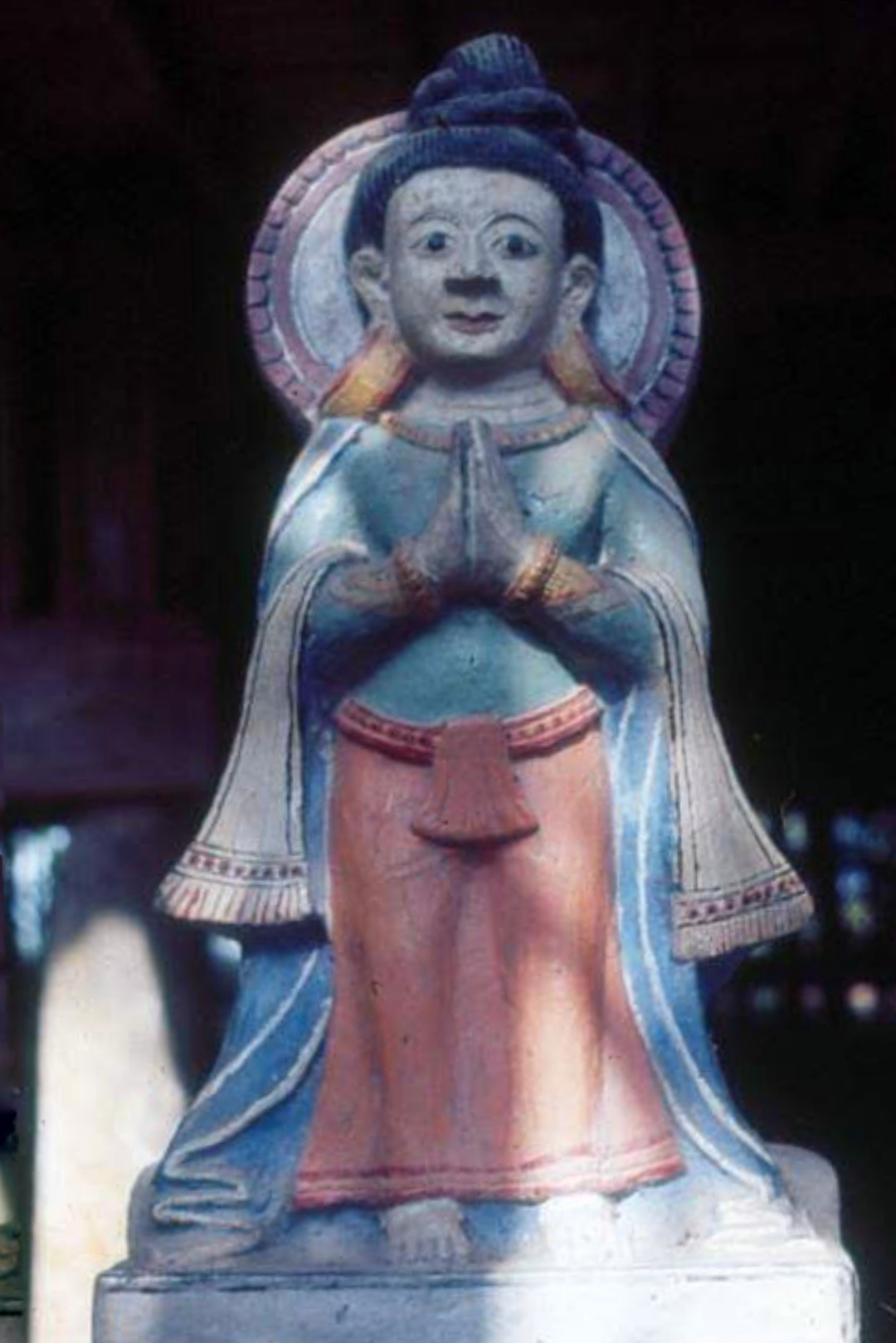
King Min Hti

The Four Cities Era (818–1406 AD) refers to a historical period during which four cities—Pyu-sa (818–1103), First Parein (1103–1123), Second Parein (1123–1250), and Launggyet (1250–1406)—were successively established as capitals. This era is named after the governance centered around these four cities. The relocations were partly occasioned by the changing course of the river. During the First Parein period, the region came under the influence of Pagan (Bagan).

Between 1406 and 1429, the area was briefly under the control of Ava. However, prior to that, Arakan's southern territories remained independent until about the 13th century.

== Mrauk U ==
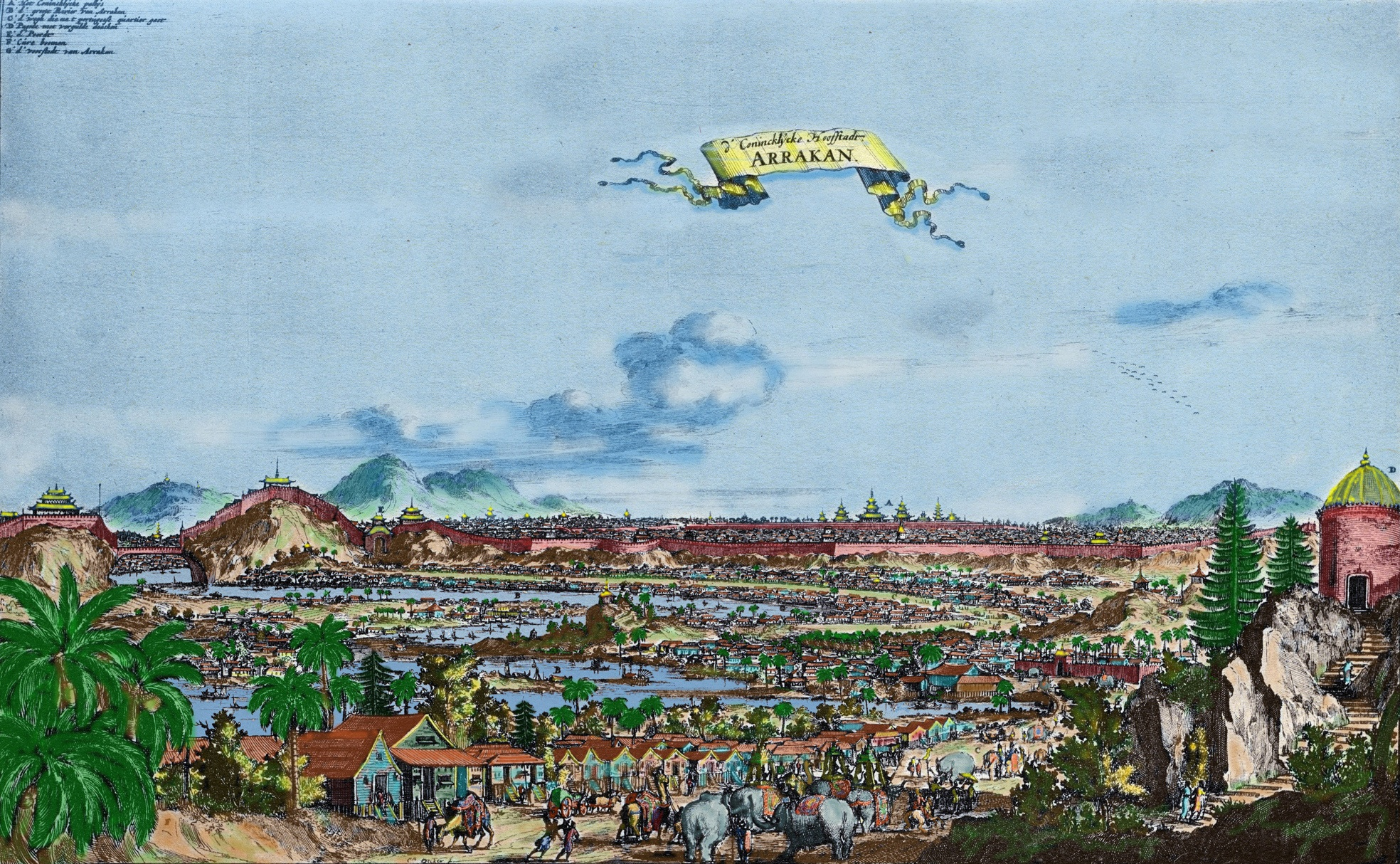
Mrauk U, or Arrakan (city of Arrakan), in the first plan the Portuguese settlement of Daingri-pet. In Wouter Schouten : Oost-Indische Voyagie, t.o. p. 148. 1676

Mrauk U may seem to be a sleepy village today but not so long ago it was the capital of the Arakan kingdom where Portuguese, Dutch and French traders rubbed shoulders with the literati of Bengal and Mughal princes on the run. Mrauk U was declared capital of the Arakanese kingdom in 1430. At its peak, Mrauk U controlled half of modern-day Rakhine State (Arakan) and the western part of Lower Burma. It also controlled the western coastal region of modern-day Bangladesh including Chittagong. Pagodas and temples were built as the city grew, and those that remain are the main attraction of Mrauk U. From the 15th to 18th centuries, Mrauk U was the capital of a mighty Arakan kingdom, frequently visited by foreign traders (including Portuguese and Dutch), and this is reflected in the grandeur and scope of the structures dotted around its vicinity.

The old capital of Rakhine (Arakan) was first constructed by King Min Saw Mon in the 15th century, and remained its capital for 355 years. The golden city of Mrauk U became known in Europe as a city of oriental splendor after Friar Sebastian Manrique visited the area in the early 17th century. Father Manrique's vivid account of the coronation of King Thiri Thudhamma in 1635 and about the Rakhine Court and intrigues of the Portuguese adventurers fire the imagination of later authors. The English author Maurice Collis who made Mrauk U and Rakhine famous after his book, The Land of the Great Image based on Friar Manrique' travels in Arakan.

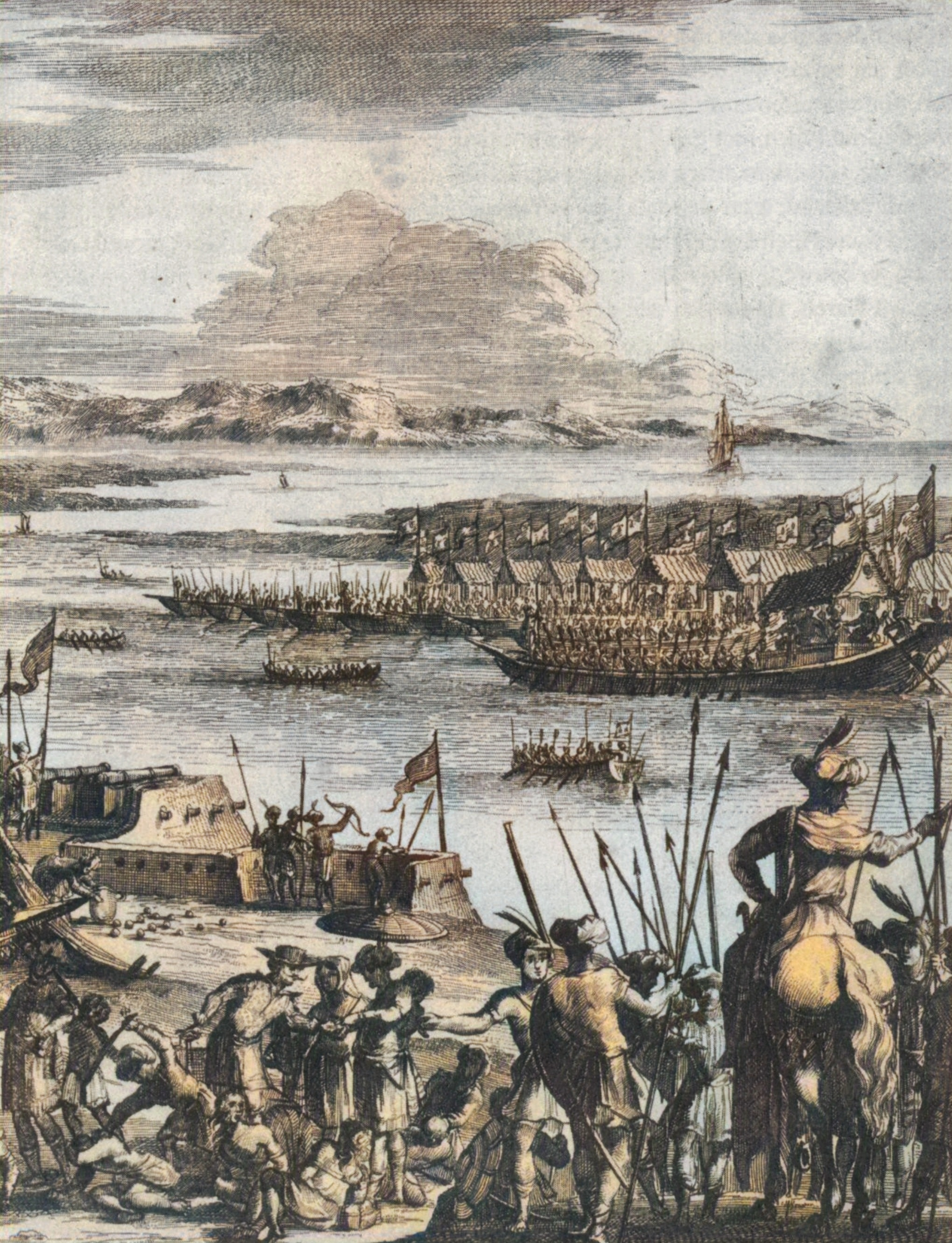
Arakanese Galleass at Ichamatic River near Pipli, West Bengal was in Battlefields Ready Position against Moguls Cavalry

The Mahamuni Buddha Image, which is now in Mandalay, was cast and venerated 15 miles from Mrauk U where another Mahamuni Buddha Image flanked by two other Buddha images. To the east of the old city is the famous Kispanadi stream and far away the Lemro river. The city area used to have a network of canals. Mrauk U maintains a small archaeological Museum near Palace site, which is right in the centre of town. As a prominent capital Mrauk U was carefully built in a strategic location by levelling three small hills. The pagodas are strategically located on hilltops and serve as fortresses; indeed they are once used as such in times of enemy intrusion. There are moats, artificial lakes and canals and the whole area could be flooded to deter or repulse attackers. There are innumerable pagodas and Buddha images around the old city and the surrounding hills. While some are still being used as places of worship today, others are in ruins, some of which are now being restored to their original splendor.

Mrauk U Kingdom at its probable height

The city eventually reached a size of 160,000 in the early 17th century. Mrauk U served as the capital of the Mrauk U kingdom and its 49 kings until the conquest of the kingdom by the Burmese Konbaung dynasty in 1784.

=== Trading city ===
Due to its proximity to the Bay of Bengal, Mrauk U developed into an important regional trade hub, acting as both a back door to the Burmese hinterland and also as an important port along the eastern shore of the Bay of Bengal. It became a transit point for goods such as rice, ivory, elephants, tree sap and deer hide from Ava in Burma, and of cotton, slaves, horses, cowrie, spices and textiles from Bengal, India, Persia and Arabia. Alongside Pegu and later Syriam, it was one of the most important ports in Burma until the 18th century.

The city also traded with non-Asian powers such as Portugal and then the VOC of the Netherlands. The VOC established trading relations with the Arakanese in 1608 after the Portuguese fell in favour due to the lack of loyalty of Portuguese mercenaries, such as Filipe de Brito e Nicote in the service of the Arakanese king. The VOC established a permanent factory in Mrauk U in 1635, and operated in Arakan until 1665.

At its zenith, Mrauk U was the centre of a kingdom which stretched from the shores of the Ganges river to the western reaches of the Ayeyarwady River. According to popular Arakanese legend, there were 12 'cities of the Ganges' which constitute areas around the borders of present-day Bangladesh which were governed by Mrauk U, including areas in the Chittagong Division. During that period, its kings minted coins inscribed in Arakanese, Arabic and Bengali. Much of Mrauk U's historical description is drawn from the writings of Friar Sebastian Manrique, a Portuguese Augustinian friar who resided in Mrauk U from 1630 to 1635.

== Colonial period ==
The people of Rakhine resisted the conquest of the kingdom for decades after. Fighting with the Rakhine resistance, initially led by Nga Than Dè and finally by Chin Byan in border areas, created problems between British India and Burma. The year 1826 saw the defeat of the Bamar in the First Anglo-Burmese War and Rakhine was ceded to Britain under the Treaty of Yandabo. Sittwe (Akyab) was then designated the new capital of Rakhine. In 1852, Rakhine was merged into Lower Burma as a territorial division.

During the Second World War, Rakhine (Arakan) was given autonomy under the Japanese occupation and was even granted its own army known as the Arakan Defence Force. The Arakan Defence Force went over to the Allies and turned against the Japanese in early 1945.

== Part of independent Burma ==
Upon independence in 1948, Rakhine (Arakan) became a division within the Union of Burma. Shortly after, violence broke out along religious lines between Buddhists and Muslims. Later there were calls for secession by the Rakhine (Arakan), but such attempts were subdued. In 1974, the Ne Win government's new constitution granted Rakhine (Arakan) Division the status of a Union state. In 1989, the name of Arakan State was changed to "Rakhine" by the military junta.

== Historical artifacts ==
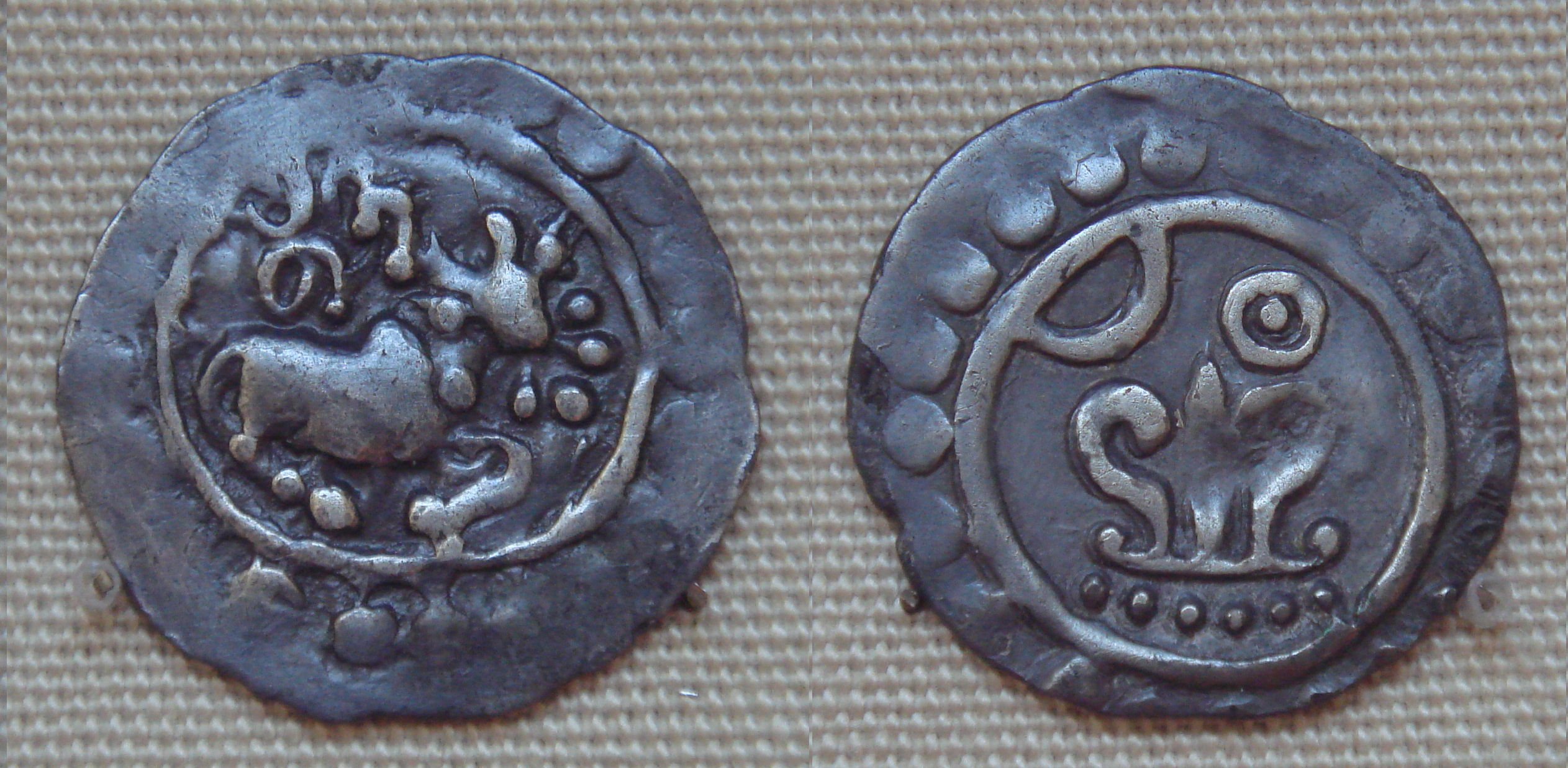
Silver coin of king Nitichandra of Arakan in 8th century (British Museum). Most Arakan coins had the name of the ruling king on one side and the logo of the sun and moon and Srivatsa on the other side.

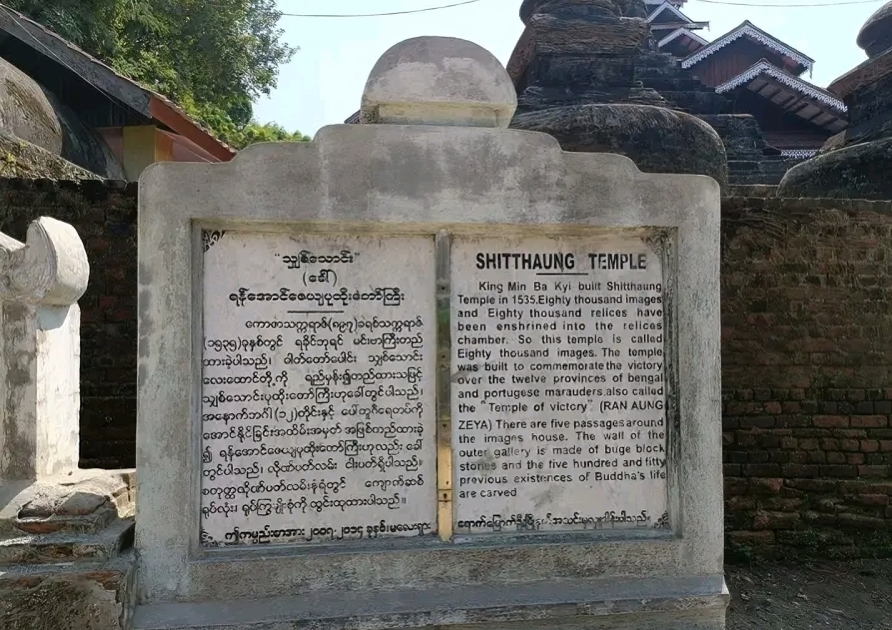
Inscription about King Min Bin in the Shite-thaung Temple of Mrauk U

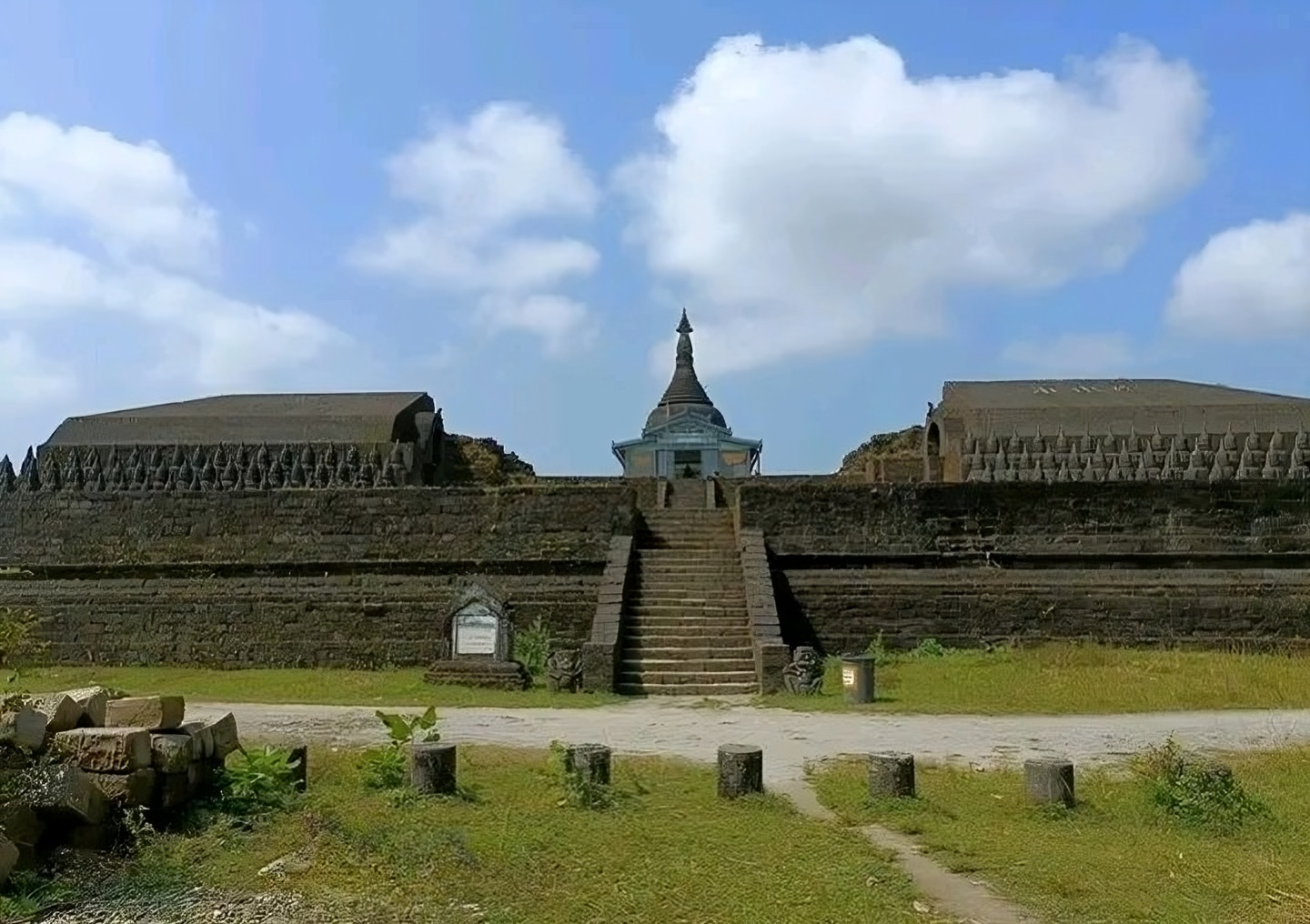
The Koe-thaung Temple (also known as "Temple of 90,000 Buddha Images")

The oldest artefact, stone image of Fat Monk inscribed "Saccakaparibajaka Jina" in Brahmi script inscription comes to the date of first century AD.

An ancient stone inscription in Nagari character was discovered by the archaeologist Forchhammer. Known as Salagiri, this hill was where the great teacher came to Rakhine some 2500 years ago. Somewhere from eastern part of this hill, a stone image in Dhamma-cakra-mudra now kept in Mrauk-U museum, was found earlier in 1923. This relief sculpture found on the Salagiri Hill represents Bengali Hindu king Chandra Suriya belongs to 4th century CE; five more red sandstone slabs with the carving were found close by the south of this Salagiri Hill in 1986. They are the same type as the single slab found earlier in 1923. These carving slabs of Bhumispara-mudra, Kararuna-mudra, Dhammacakra-mudara, and Mmahaparinibbana-mudra represent the life of Buddha.

These sculptures provide earliest evidence about the advent of Buddhism into Rakhine; during the lifetime of the Buddha and these discoveries were therefore assumed as the figures of King Chandra Suriya of Dyanawadi, who dedicated the Great Maha Muni Image. These archaeological findings have been studied by eminent scholars and conclusion is that the Maha Muni was made during the king Sanda Suriya era.

The founder of Vesali city, King Dvan Chandra carved Vesali Paragri Buddha-image in AD 327 and set a dedicatory inscription in Pali verse:

ye dhamma hetuppabhava / Tathagato aha / tesan ca yo nirodho / evamvadi Mahasamano.

That Buddha-image is carved out by a single block and the earliest image of Vesali.

The meaning of Ye Dhamma Hetu verse is as follow.

Of these dhammas which arise from causes / The Tathagata has declared causes / Lord Buddha preached about the causes / And the effects gained by the causes / And that which is the ceasing of them, Nirawda Thitesa / This the great ascetic declares.

The verse, which is considered as the essence of Theravada spirit, bears testimony to the fact that Buddhism flourished to an utmost degree in Vesali. The relationship of Vesali with foreign countries especially Ceylon would be established for Buddhism.

Anandachandra Inscriptions date back to 729 originally from Vesali, now preserved at Shitethaung, indicates adequate evidence for the earliest foundation of Buddhism. Dr. E. H. Johnston's analysis reveals a list of kings which he considered reliable beginning from Chandra dynasty. The western face inscription has 72 lines of text recorded in 51 verses describing the Anandachandra's ancestral rulers. Each face recorded the name and ruling period of each king who were believed to have ruled over the land before Anandachandra. Archaeology has shown that the establishment of so many stone pagodas and inscriptions which have been totally neglected for centuries in different part of Rakhine speak of popular favoured by Buddhism.

The cubic stone inscriptions record the peace making between the governor of Thandaway (Sandoway) Mong Khari (1433–1459, known in Burmese as Min Khayi) and Razadhiraj the Mon Emperor in Rakhine inscription. This was found from a garrison hill at the oldest site of Parein. A stone slab with the alleged figure of the Hindu Bengali King Chandra Suriya bore testimony to the Salagiri tradition, depicting of the advent of the Teacher to Dyanyawaddy.

== See also ==
- List of Arakanese monarchs
- Pyu city states
- Rakhine people
- Arakan

== Bibliography ==
- Charney, Michael W. (1993). 'Arakan, Min Yazagyi, and the Portuguese: The Relationship Between the Growth of Arakanese Imperial Power and Portuguese Mercenaries on the Fringe of Mainland Southeast Asia 1517–1617.' Masters dissertation, Ohio University.
- Leider, Jacques P. (2004). 'Le Royaume d'Arakan, Birmanie. Son histoire politique entre le début du XVe et la fin du XVIIe siècle,' Paris, EFEO.
- The Land of the Great Image: Being Experiences of Friar Manrique in Arakan, Maurice Collis (1943), (US publication 1958, Alfred A. Knopf)
- Aye Chan.The Kingdom of Arakan in the Indian Ocean Commerce (AD 1430–1666) (2012), The Bulletin of the Bu San University of Foreign Studies, Korea.
