= Parein =

Parein ပရိန်မြို့
- Location in Burma
- Coordinates: 20°33′50″N 93°14′20″E
- country: Myanmar
- state: Rakhine State
- District: Mrauk-U District
- Township: Mrauk-U Township
- Founded: 1103

Population
  - Ethnicities: Rakhine people
  - Religions: Buddhism
- Time zone: UTC+6.30 (MMT)

Parein (Burmese: ပရိန်မြို့, Burmese pronunciation: [pə.ɹèɪɰ̃ mjo̼]) is the former capital of the Parein Dynasty of Arakan from 1103/1106 to 1167 during the Le-Mro period. The site of the former capital is located a few miles southeast of Mrauk U and north of Launggyet within Mrauk-U Township.

== Geography ==
The old city of Parein faces the Lemro River in the east. It has at its back a ridge that run parallel to the Mong-swe ridge between the Kaladan and Lemro Rivers. In the south, Paungdok creek separates Parein from the Launggret. To its north is the Alayzee creek.

== History ==
In the eleventh century, the Waithali Kingdom declined, giving way to the Lemro period of Arakanese history. The history of this period is dependent on chronicles which state that the shift in power from the Kaladan valley, where Waithali lies, to the Lemro valley began when the capital was moved to Sambawak and then Pyinsa. Pyinsa developed for a few decades before the capital was, again, moved to Parein. Based on the chronicles, Parein was founded during the reign of the king Letya Min Nan who recovered the usurped throne of his grandfather with the help of Alaungsithu, the king of Bagan.

Later, the capital shifted rapidly to Hkrit and Nareinzara Toungoo before settling on Launggyet for over a century. The Lemro valley capitals were all smaller than previous cities like Waithali. Most, including Parein, lay on the western lowland shores of the Lemro river with their walls disappearing over the course of time.

== In religion ==
In Arakanese legend and chronicle, the nat Mra Swan is the lady guardian spirit of Parein. The poem about Mra Swan goes:

In the Pontu area, if outside the plain of Parein, Mra Swan does not greet.

In 1992, a new large shrine was constructed by Myanmar Army soldiers. The shrine is built in the middle of fields with the statue of Mra Swan facing west towards the location of the old palace. The revival of worship sites for minor nats within Mrauk-U Township, like the shrine in Parein, may be a way in which Burmese military officers attempt to gain symbolic recognition by drawing on the historical involvement of the Bagan Kingdom in the Lemro Valley's history.

== Bibliography ==
- Htin, Kyaw (2007). The Forgotten Cities of Arakan. Kuala Lumpur.
- Sandamala Linkara, Ashin (1931). Rakhine Yazawinthit Kyan (in Burmese). Vol. 1–2 (1997 ed.). Yangon: Tetlan Sarpay.

Parein
Preceded by Pyinsa	Capital of Arakan; 1106–1167	Succeeded by Hkrit
