= Le-myet-hna Temple =

Buddhist temple in Mrauk U, Myanmar

Lemyet'hna Temple
- လေးမျက်နှာဘုရား
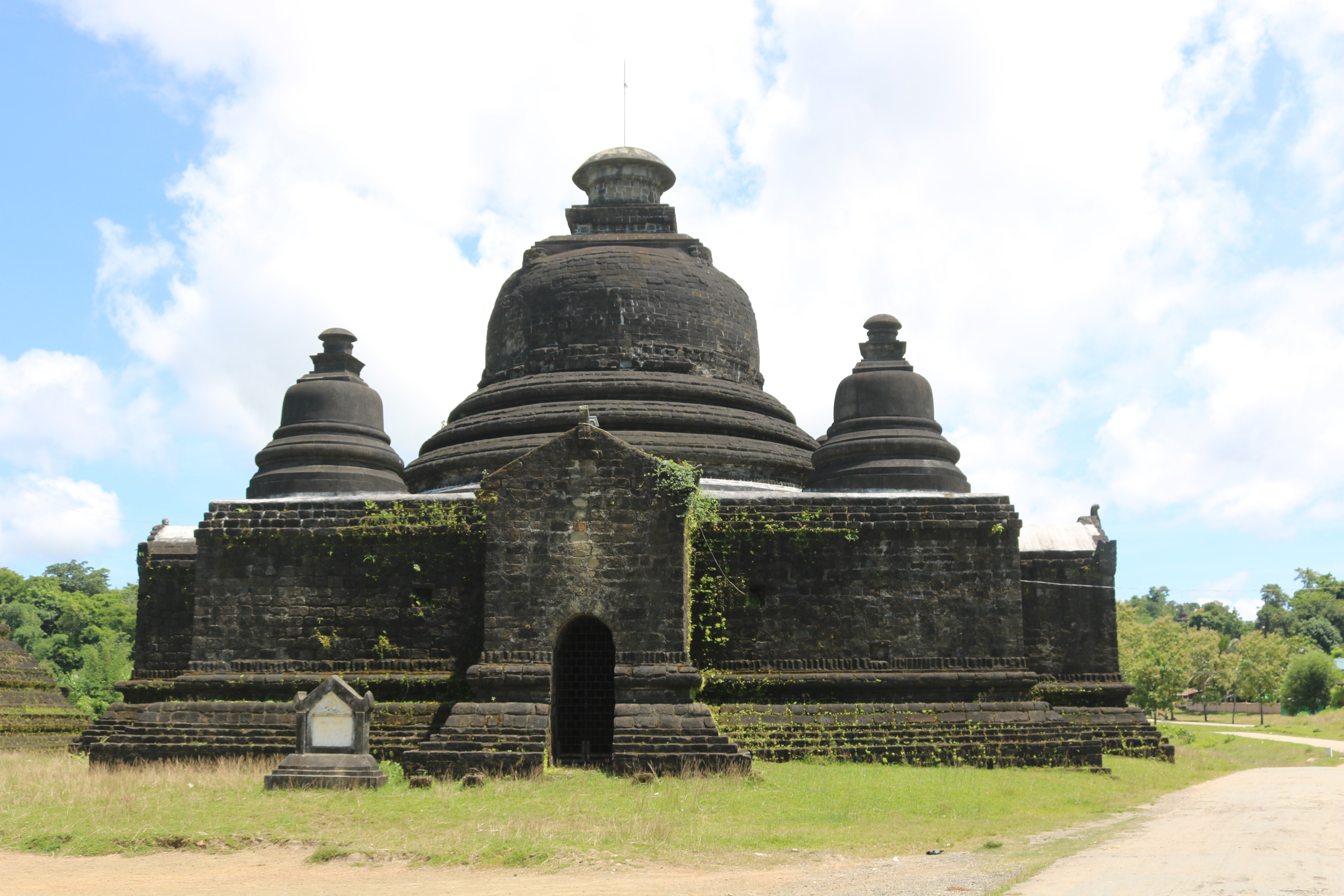
- Le Myet Hna Temple

- Location within Myanmar

Religion
- Affiliation: Theravada Buddhism

Location
- Location: Mrauk U, Rakhine State
- Country: Myanmar
- Coordinates: 20.598460°N 93.190832°E

Architecture
- Founder: King Min Saw Mon
- Completed: 1430 AD

Le-myet-hna (Burmese: လေးမျက်နှာဘုရား le:myak-hna bhu.ra:, Burmese pronunciation: [lé mjeʔn̥à pʰəjá] Leìmyeʔhna hpăyà; lit. 'four-sided temple') is a Buddhist temple in Mrauk U located at the northwest corner of the Shite-thaung Temple. It has four entrances, one at each cardinal point and eight seated Buddhas around a central column. It was built by King Min Saw Mon in 1430 AD. The temple was entirely constructed of black sandstone.

== See also ==
- Shite-thaung Temple
- Htukkanthein Temple
- Koe-thaung Temple
- Andaw-thein Ordination Hall
- Ratanabon Pagoda
- List of Buddhist temples in Myanmar
- Min Saw Mon

== Bibliography ==
- Gutman, Pamela (2001). Burma's Lost Kingdoms: Splendours of Arakan. Bangkok: Orchid Press. ISBN 974-8304-98-1.
