= Mrauk U =

Town in Rakhine State, Myanmar

Mrauk U မြောက်‌ဦးမြို့
- Town
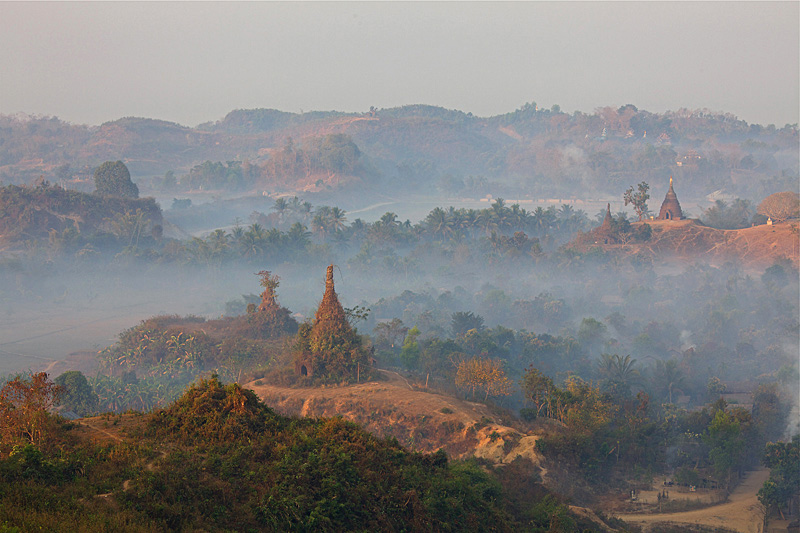
- Mrauk U from Shwetaung pagoda

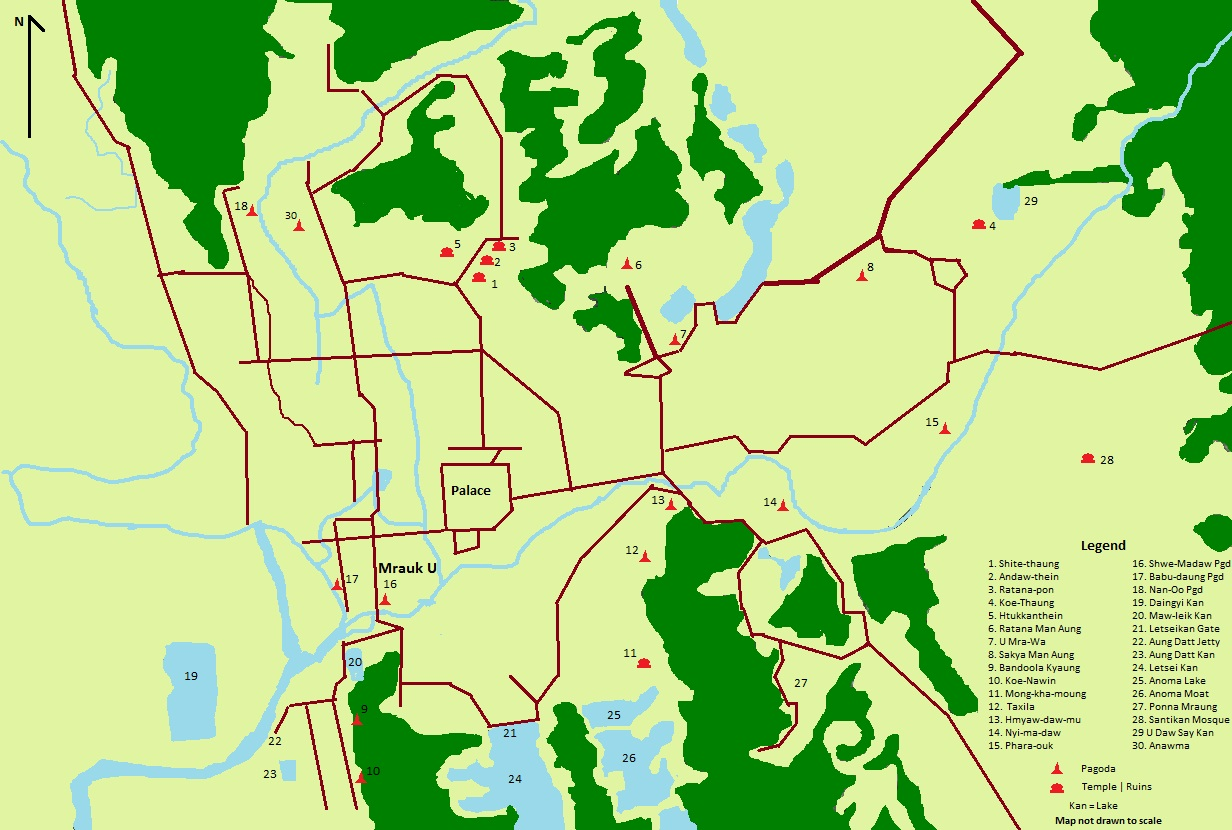
- Map of Mrauk U with main temples

- Location in Myanmar (Burma)
- Coordinates: 20°35′24″N 93°11′33″E
- Country: Myanmar
- Division: Rakhine State
- District: Mrauk-U District
- Township: Mrauk-U Township
- Control: Arakan Army
- Settled: 16 November 1430

Population (2014 census)
  - Total: 36,139
  - Ethnicities: Rakhine (majority)
  - Religions: Theravada Buddhism (majority); Muslim; Hinduism and Catholic minorities
- Time zone: UTC+6.30 (MMT)

Mrauk U (Note: Burmese: မြောက်‌ဦးမြို့, MLCTS: mrauk u: mrui., Burmese pronunciation: [mjaʊʔ ú mjo̰]; also spelled Mrauk-U or Mrauk Oo, and formerly Mrohaung or Myohuang) (/məˈraʊuː, ˈmraʊuː/ mə-ROW-oo, MROW-oo) is a town in northern Rakhine State, Myanmar. It is the capital of Mrauk-U Township, a subregion of the Mrauk-U District.

Mrauk U is culturally significant for the local Rakhine (Arakanese) people and is the location of many important archeological sites. From 1430 until 1785, it was the capital of the Mrauk U Kingdom, the largest and most powerful Rakhine kingdom in history.

== Etymology ==
Some Rakhine scholars state that the name Mrauk U means 'The First Accomplishment' in archaic Arakanese. This is based on the story of the Arakanese being able to crush an invasion by the Pyu in the mid 10th Century by a Mro prince, Pai Phru. The town is said to be located roughly near the region where the Pyu invaders were decimated. The prince went on to claim the throne of Waithali from his uncle who had murdered the prince's father due to a love scandal. The battle was seen as the first accomplishment of the prince, and thus, the name 'First Accomplishment' came to be associated with the place.

=== Mythology ===
A dismissed myth was that in the region where Mrauk U was to be constructed, lived a lonely female monkey. She met a peacock and the two later cohabited. The female monkey conceived with the peacock, and it laid an egg. A human son was born from the egg and he grew up to become a mighty prince. The prince later built a city near the jungle, and in respect of his birth story, the city was called Myauk-U meaning "Monkey's Egg".

== History ==
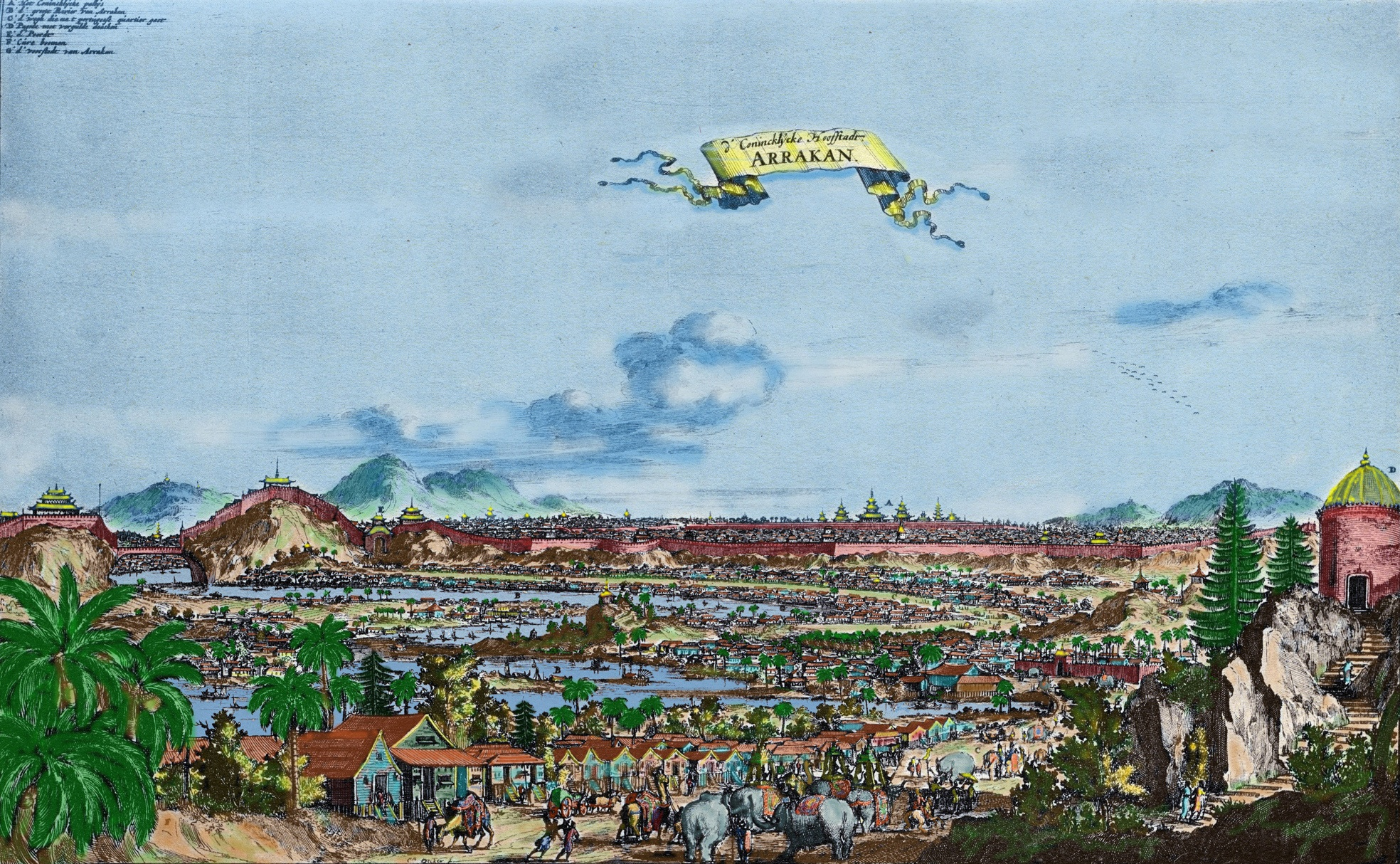
Mrauk-U, or Arrakan (city of Arrakan), in the first plan of the Portuguese settlement of Daingri-pet, from Wouter Schouten: Oost-Indische Voyagie, t.o. p. 148. 1676.

In 1430, King Min Saw Mon established Mrauk U as the capital of the last unified Arakanese Kingdom. The city eventually reached a size of 160,000 in the early seventeenth century. Mrauk U served as the capital of the Mrauk U kingdom and its 49 kings till the conquest of the kingdom by the Burmese Konbaung Dynasty in 1784.

Mrauk-U was divided into three periods: the earliest period (1430–1530), the middle period (1531–1638), and the last period (1638–1784). In Arakan antiquities at the Mrauk-U seem to provide rational evidence of where Buddhism settled. The golden days of Mrauk U city, those of the 16th and 17th centuries were contemporary to the days of Tudor kings, the Moghuls, the Ayutthaya kings and Ava (Inwa), Taungoo and Hanthawaddy kings of Myanmar. Mrauk U was cosmopolitan city, fortified by a 30-kilometer long fortification and an intricate net of moats and canals. At the centre of the city was the Royal Place, looming high over the surrounding area like an Asian Acropolis. Waterways formed by canals and creeks earned the fame of distinct resemblance to Venice.

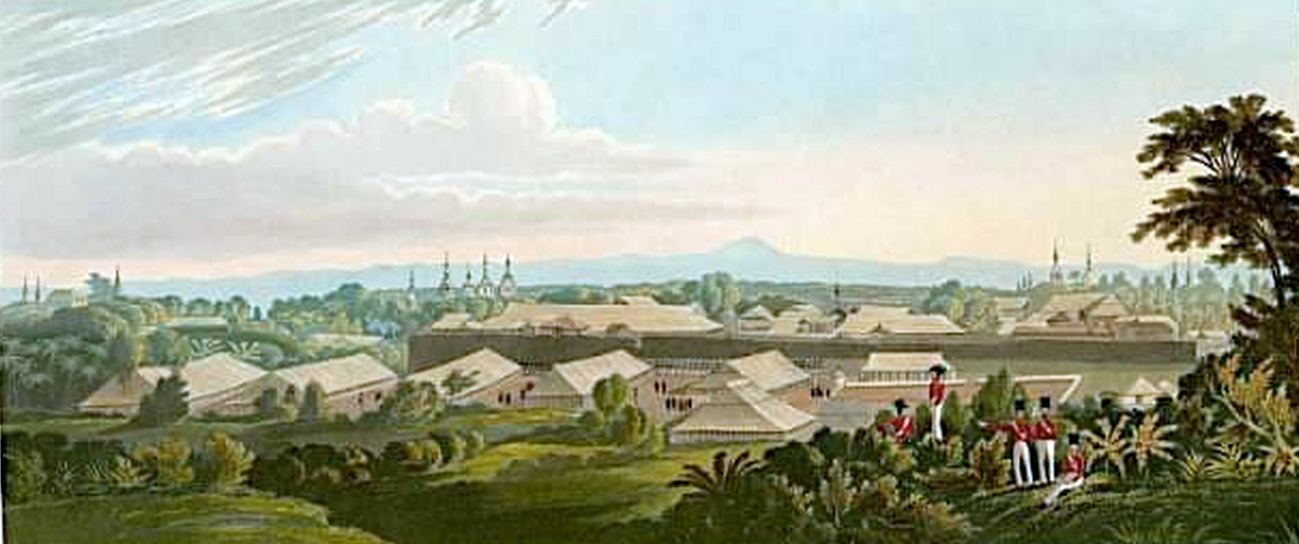
An illustration of Mrauk U under British occupation in 1834. We are looking from the east, where the Pioneers (an engineer group) were camped. The walled palace at this time was still occupied by buildings.

Mrauk U contains numerous archaeological remains, including stone inscriptions, Buddha images and representations of the Buddha's footprints. Many temples and pagodas survive in and around the town, and a number remain in active use as places of worship.

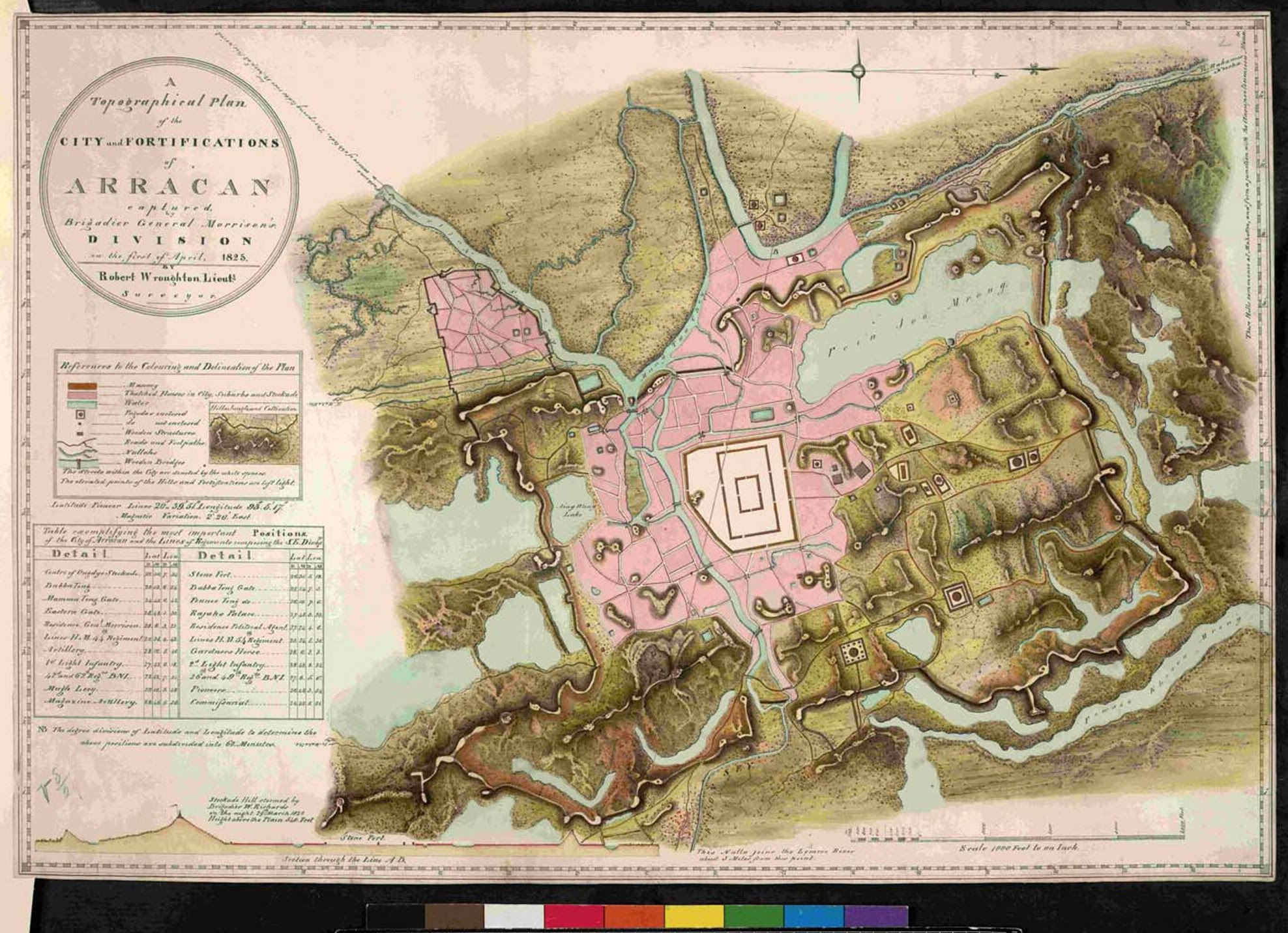
A Topographical Plan of the City and Fortifications of Arracan(Arakan) Mrauk-U by Brigade General Joseph Wanton Morrison, British Army in 1825

The area was a site of fighting during the Arakan Campaign, in the latter part of the Second World War.

On 8 February 2024 the Arakan Army captured the city from the Tatmadaw after overrunning Police Battalion 31 in the northeast of the city.

=== Incidents ===
On 16 January 2018, Rakhine protesters rioted near a government building in Mrauk U after a ban was issued by local authorities on an event that commemorated the anniversary of the Kingdom of Mrauk U's dissolution. In response to protesters attempting to seize the government building, police fired live ammunition into the crowd, killing seven and wounding twelve.

On 10 December 2025, a hospital in Mrauk-U was bombed by the Myanmar military junta, killing 33 people and injuring around 80 others.

== Geography ==
Mrauk U lies roughly 11 kilometres (6.8 mi) east of the Kaladan River on the banks of its minor tributaries. The town is located on a small outcrop of the Rakhine Yoma on the eastern side of the Kaladan's alluvial plain. Thus, the surrounding countryside is hilly yet also contains a great deal of marshes, mangroves and lakes.

=== Climate ===
Mrauk U, like all of Rakhine State, has an extreme tropical monsoon climate (Köppen Am). The town receives over 3,600 millimetres or 140 inches of rain a year from the southwest monsoon, making it one of the wettest parts of monsoon Asia. Despite this, Mrauk U is actually less wet than most of Rakhine State The wet season usually begins in late May and ends by mid-October.

Although located in a tropical region, Mrauk U enjoys lower temperatures during the arid northeastern monsoon. From mid-October to mid-March during the cool season, temperatures can drop to 13 °C or 55.4 °F. This season coincides with the tourist season for Myanmar.

The rainfall on 19 July 2011 was nearly 24 cm (9.4 in), the highest for 33 years. There was flooding because of continuous heavy rains in that month.

Climate data for Mrauk U (1981–2010)
Month	Jan	Feb	Mar	Apr	May	Jun	Jul	Aug	Sep	Oct	Nov	Dec	Year
Mean daily maximum °C (°F)	30.4 (86.7)	32.7 (90.9)	35.2 (95.4)	36.0 (96.8)	34.7 (94.5)	31.0 (87.8)	30.0 (86.0)	30.4 (86.7)	31.9 (89.4)	33.1 (91.6)	32.1 (89.8)	30.3 (86.5)	32.3 (90.1)
Mean daily minimum °C (°F)	12.1 (53.8)	13.9 (57.0)	18.3 (64.9)	22.8 (73.0)	24.0 (75.2)	24.2 (75.6)	23.9 (75.0)	23.8 (74.8)	24.2 (75.6)	23.2 (73.8)	19.8 (67.6)	14.9 (58.8)	20.4 (68.7)
Average rainfall mm (inches)	4.6 (0.18)	8.1 (0.32)	14.2 (0.56)	52.3 (2.06)	286.1 (11.26)	876.4 (34.50)	1,002.5 (39.47)	788.2 (31.03)	355.3 (13.99)	187.1 (7.37)	57.9 (2.28)	10.7 (0.42)	3,643.4 (143.44)
Source: Norwegian Meteorological Institute

== Trading ==
Due to its proximity to the Bay of Bengal, Mrauk U developed into an important regional trade hub, acting as both a back door to the Burmese hinterland and also as an important port along the eastern shore of the Bay of Bengal. It became a transit point for goods such as rice, ivory, elephants, tree sap and deer hide from Ava in Myanmar, and of cotton, slaves, horses, cowrie, spices and textiles from Bengal, India, Persia, Arabia, Dutches and Portuguese. Alongside Pegu and later Syriam, it was one of the most important ports in Myanmar up until the eighteenth century.

The city also traded with non-Asian powers such as Portugal and then the Dutch East India Company of the Netherlands. The Dutch East India Company (VOC) established trading relations with the Arakanese in 1608 after the Portuguese fell in favour due to the lack of loyalty of Portuguese mercenaries, such as Filipe de Brito e Nicote in the service of the Arakanese king. The VOC established a permanent factory in Mrauk U in 1635, and operated in Arakan till 1665.

At its zenith, Mrauk U was the centre of a kingdom which stretched from the shores of the Ganges river to the western reaches of the Ayeyarwady River. According to popular Arakanese legend, there were 12 'cities of the Ganges' which constitute roughly half of modern-day Bangladesh which were governed by Mrauk U, including Dhaka and Chittagong. During that period, its kings minted coins inscribed in Arakanese, Kufic and Bengali.

Much of Mrauk U's historical description is drawn from the writings of Friar Sebastian Manrique, a Portuguese Augustinian friar who resided in Mrauk U from 1630 to 1635.

== Rice production ==
The area around Mrauk U ranks second in the production of rice in Myanmar, after the Irrawaddy Delta.

== Religion ==
As Mrauk U and her kingdom prospered, the kings, ministers and peasants built many pagodas and temples around the town to reflect their devotion. Thus, Mrauk U houses a rich collection of temples and pagodas second only to the Central Burmese town of Bagan, in Myanmar. Most of Mrauk U's temples were constructed of hewn stone bricks, unlike the mud and clay bricks of Bagan.

The most notable temples in Mrauk U are the Shite-thaung Temple (Temple of 80,000 Images or Temple of Victory), Htukkanthein Temple (tukkan Ordination Hall), the Koe-thaung Temple (Temple of 90,000 Images) and the Five Man pagodas.

In 2017, an international commission urged Myanmar to nominate Mrauk U for UNESCO World Heritage Site status. The proposal is backed by Kofi Annan and archaeologists are now cataloguing and protecting the city's many sites in preparation for nomination.

=== Temples ===
The following are some of the famous and noteworthy religious buildings in and around the town.

- Shite-thaung Temple
- Htukkanthein Temple
- Koe-thaung Temple
- Andaw-thein Ordination Hall
- Le-myet-hna Temple
- Ratanabon Pagoda
- Laung Bwann Brauk Pagoda
- Five Man Pagodas
  - Mingala Man Aung Pagoda
  - Ratana Man Aung Pagoda
  - Sakya Man Aung Pagoda
  - Lawka Man Aung Pagoda
  - Zina Man Aung Pagoda
- Sanda Muni Temple
- Bandula Kyaung Monastery

Although Mrauk U is a primarily Buddhist site, there are several religious buildings of other faiths. The most notable would be the old Shindhikhan Mosque, built during Min Saw Mon's reign, in the southeast of the town. The mosque was destroyed during the 1980s and 1990s. Friar Manrique also mentions the presence of a Roman Catholic church and a small number of converts and foreign born Catholics (including ronin who were forced out of Japan due to persecution by the shogunate of Tokugawa Ieyasu). During this time, the Portuguese missionaries built churches and introduced Christian religious practices.

The Japanese ronins are also known to ventured in Southeast Asia, including the Mrauk U Kingdom, where they offered their military expertise. They served as elite guards and these Japanese warriors played active roles in the Arakanese royal court notably around the time of King Min Phalaung and Min Razagyi.

== Tourism ==
Prior to the current civil war in Myanmar, Mrauk U was a major archaeological and tourist destination. The main attractions are the temples and ruins around the town. The remains of the main palace roughly form the centre of the town. Tourists could travel to Mrauk U by a domestic flight from Yangon to Sittwe and then aboard a boat from Sittwe via the Kaladan River. Currently, because Mrauk-U is controlled by the Arakan Army, there is no tourism in the town.

== Infrastructure ==
Although a tourist destination, most of Mrauk U has very basic infrastructure. It has a Township hospital, a Basic Education High School and a market. Like much of Rakhine state and the whole of Myanmar, Mrauk U has 24-hour electricity.

== Gallery ==
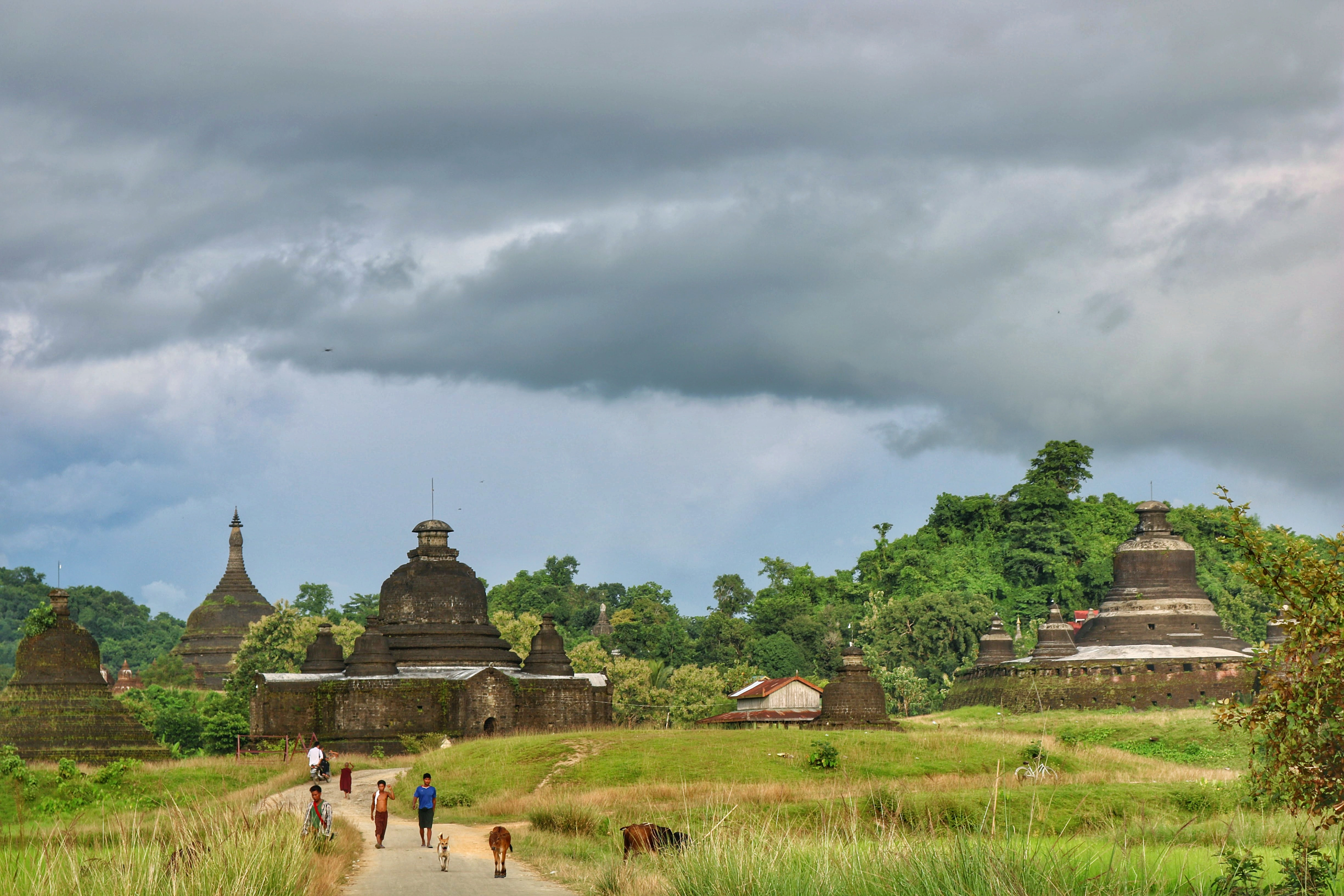
Mrauk U Landscape

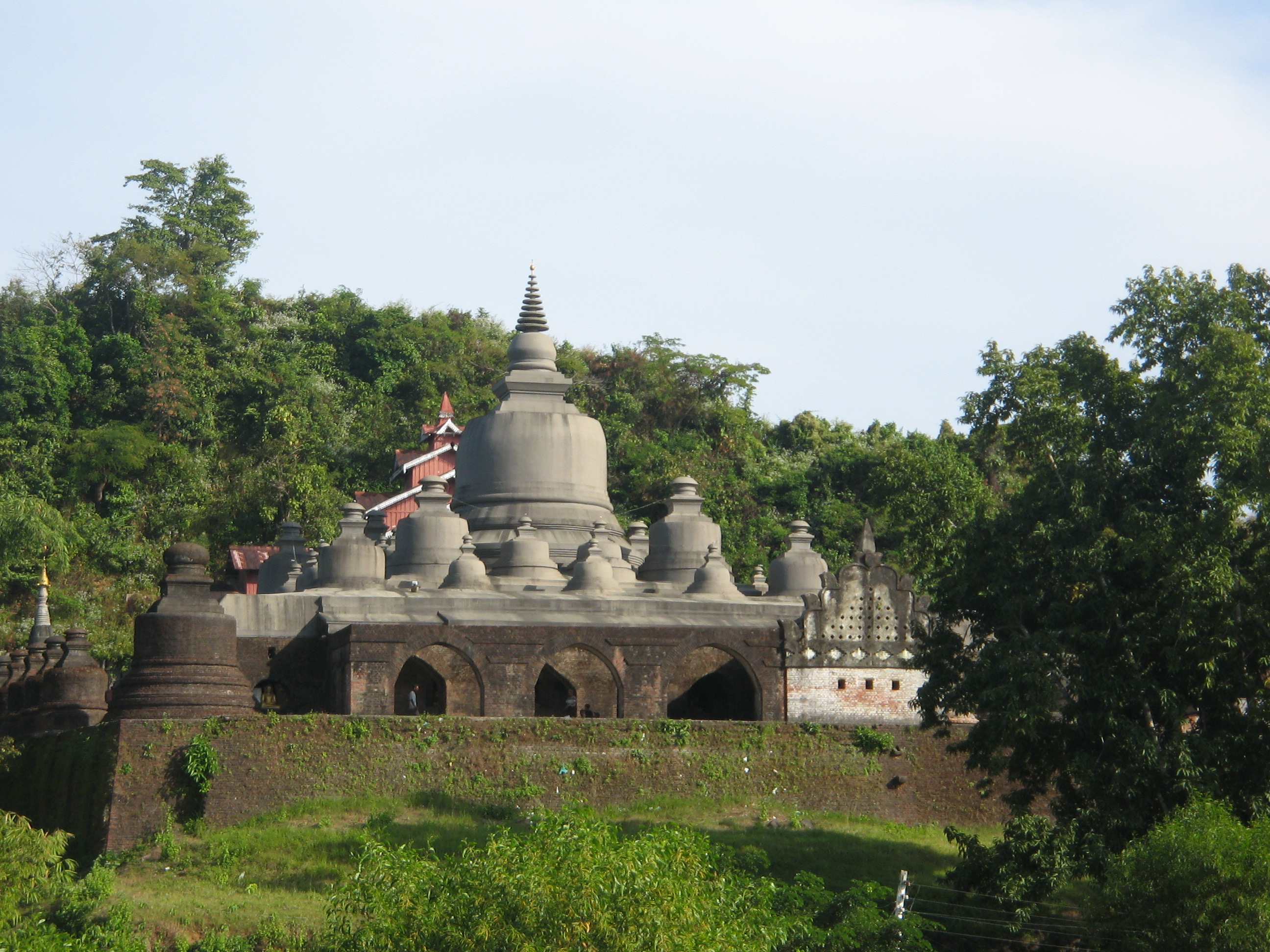
Shite-thaung Temple

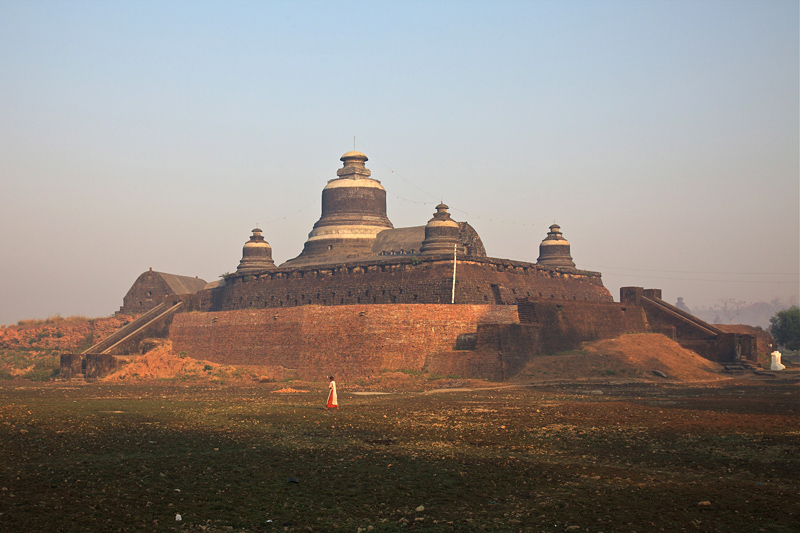
Htukkanthein Temple

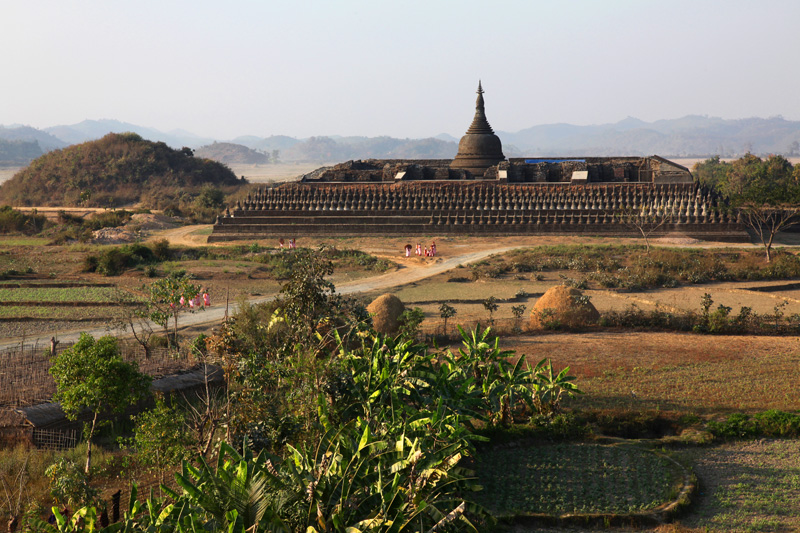
Koe-thaung Temple

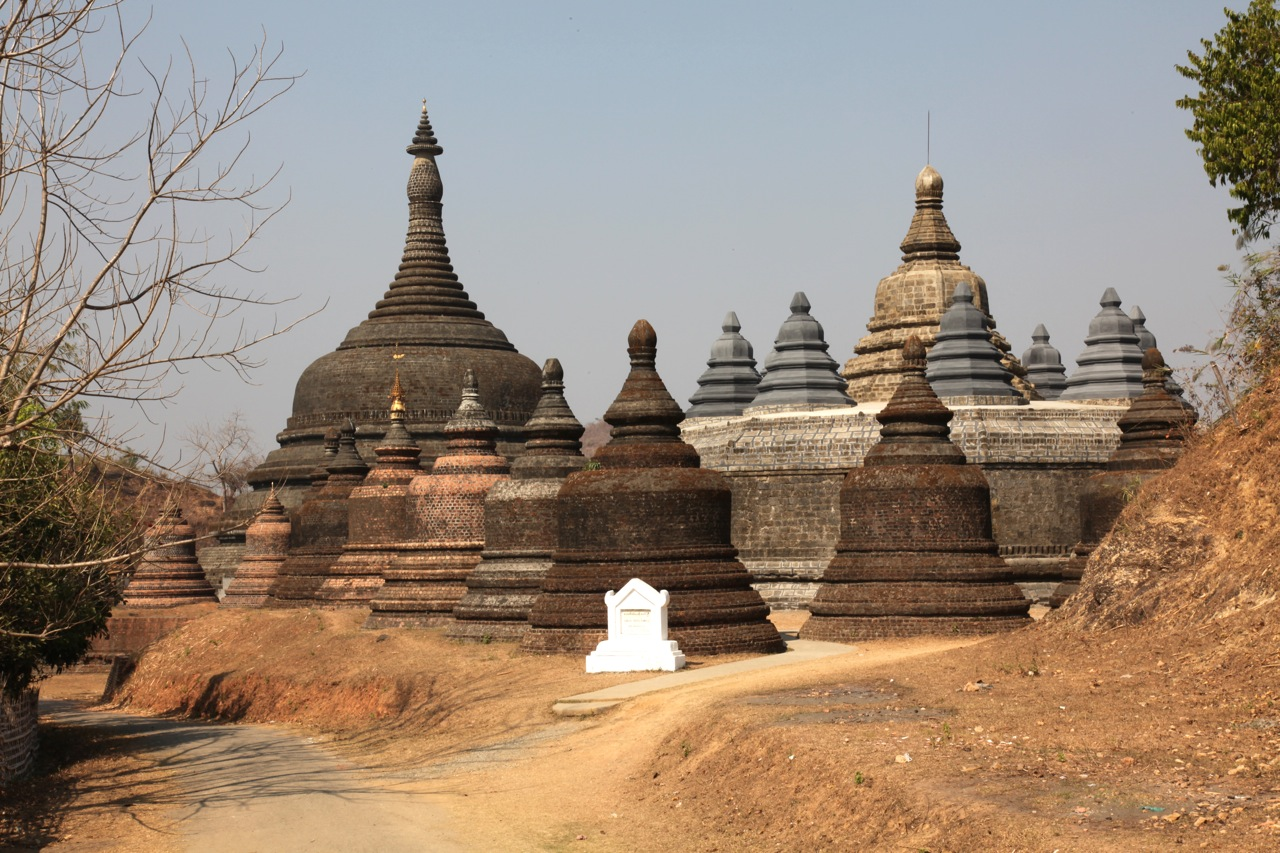
Andaw-thein Ordination Hall

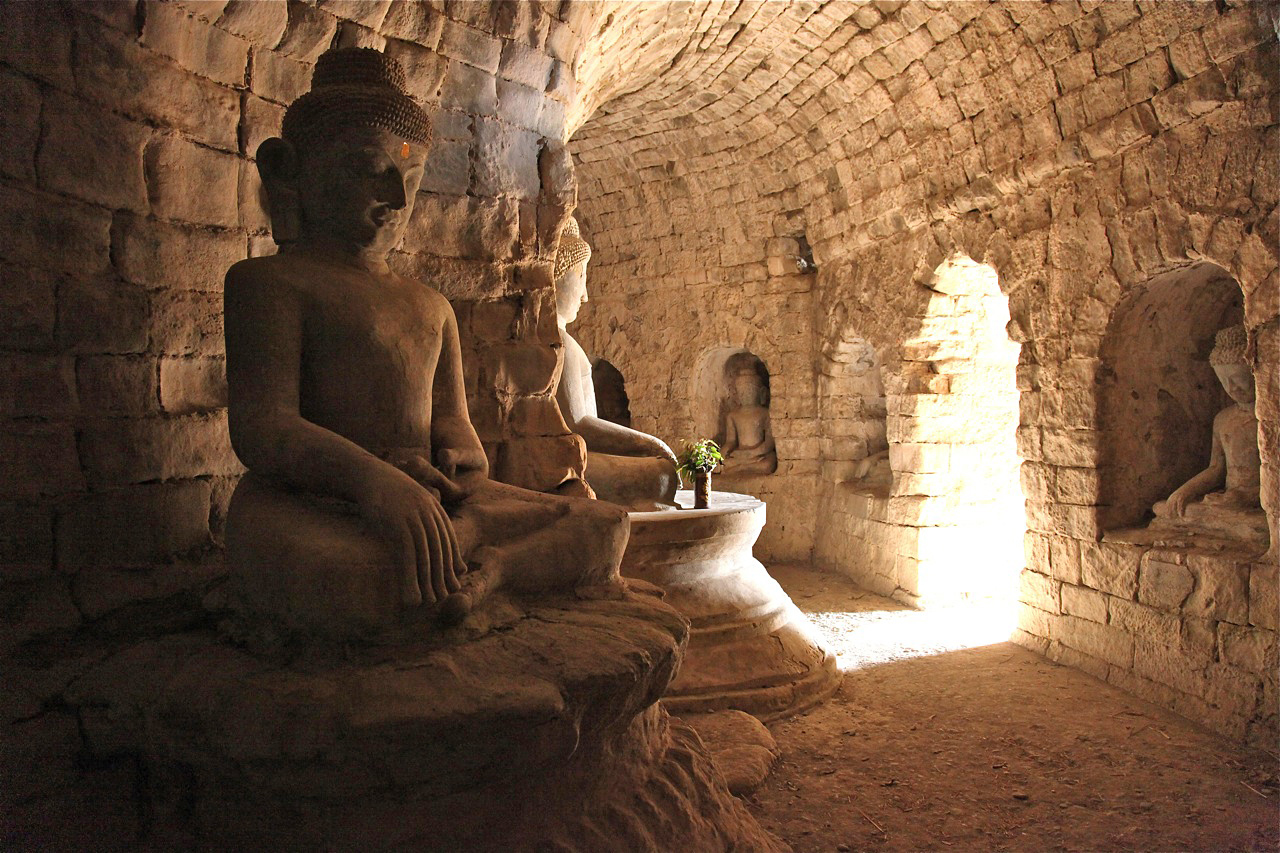
Le-myet-hna Temple

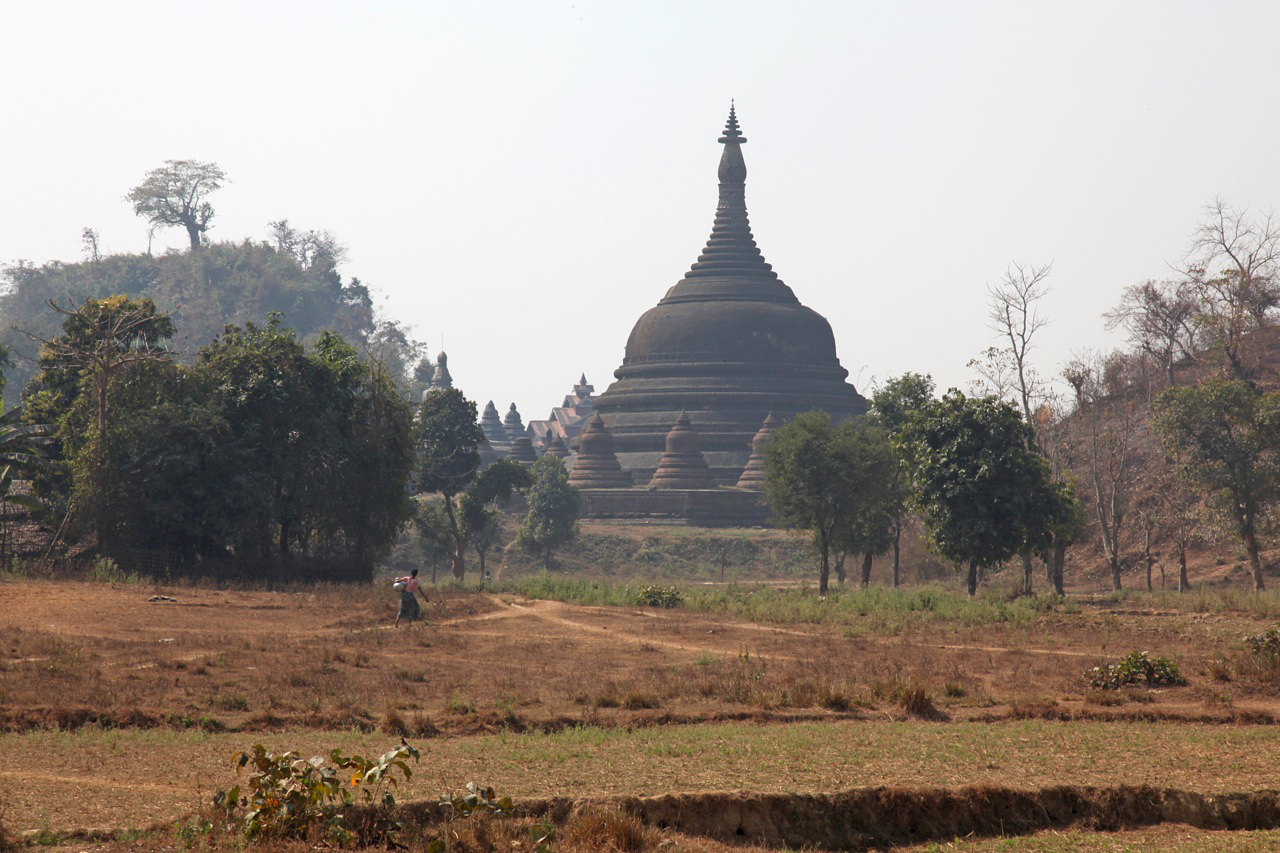
Ratana-pon

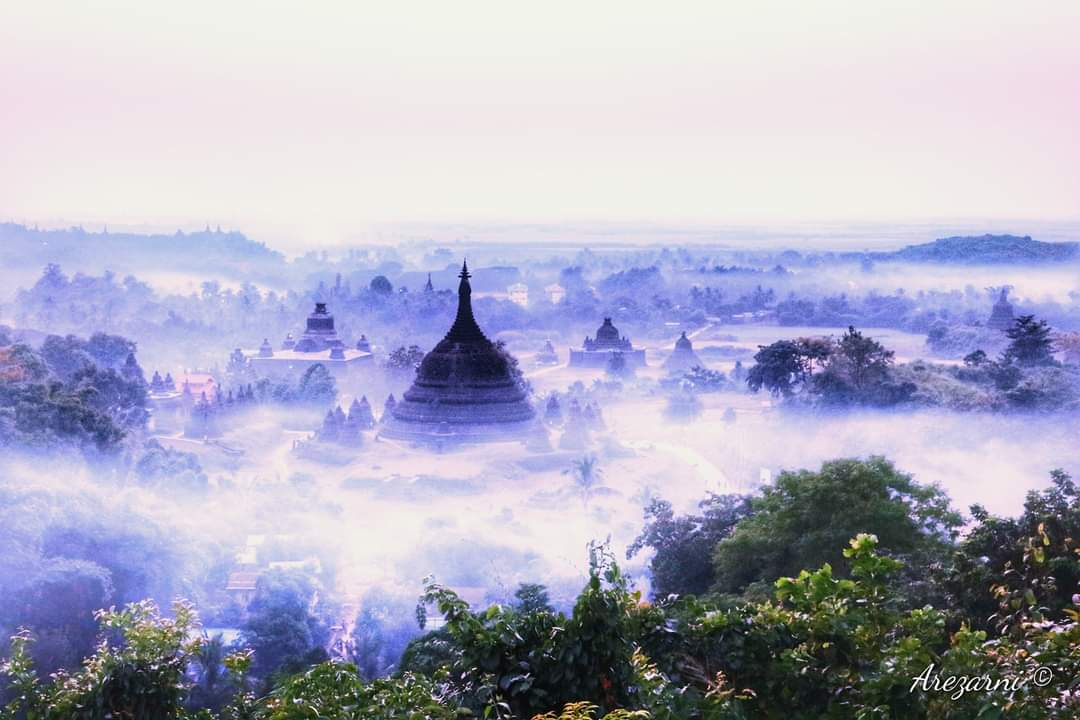
Misty evening scene around ancient Temples of Mrauk-U

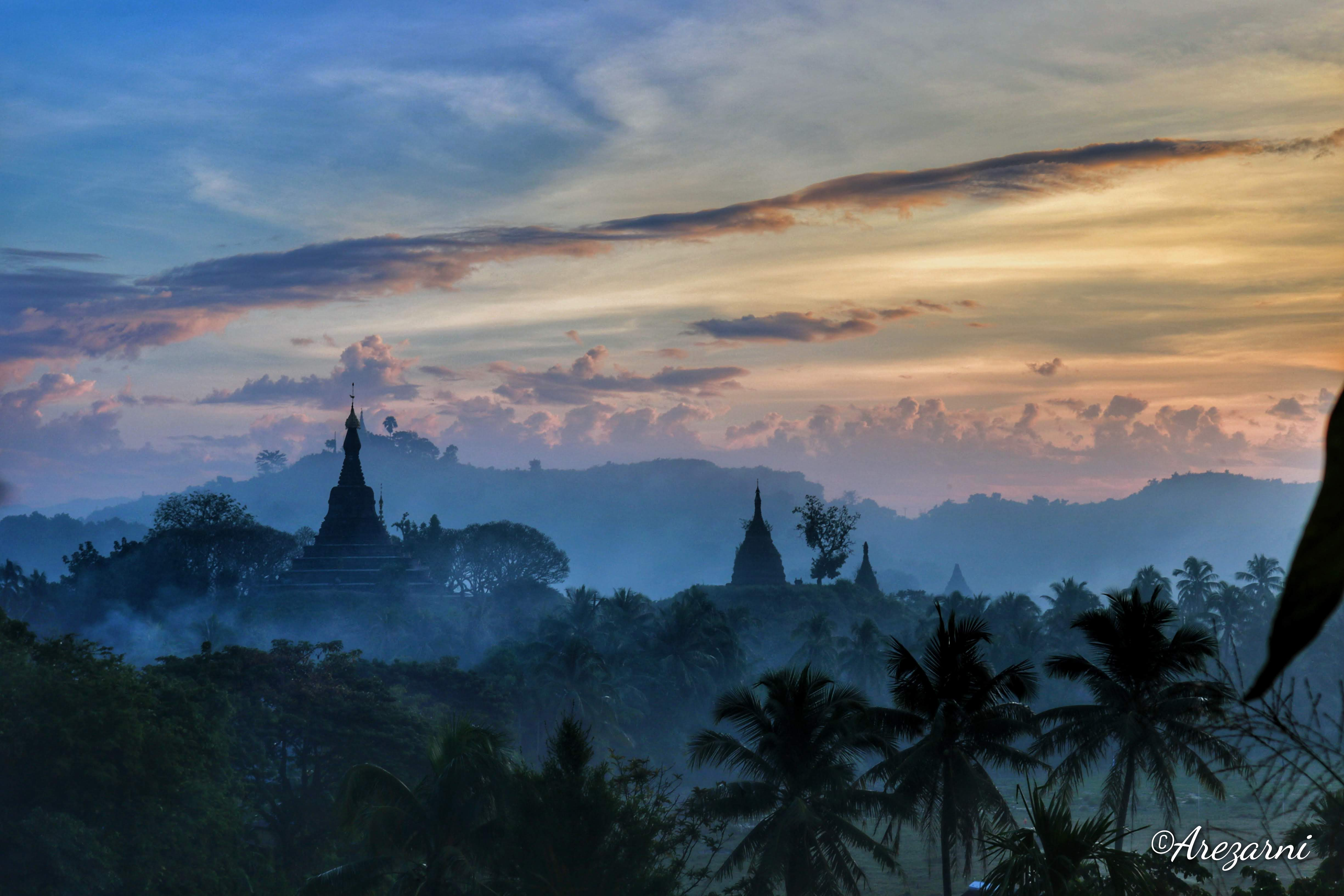
View of Zina ManAung Zedi and Panthi Taung Pagodas of Mrauk-U in early dawn

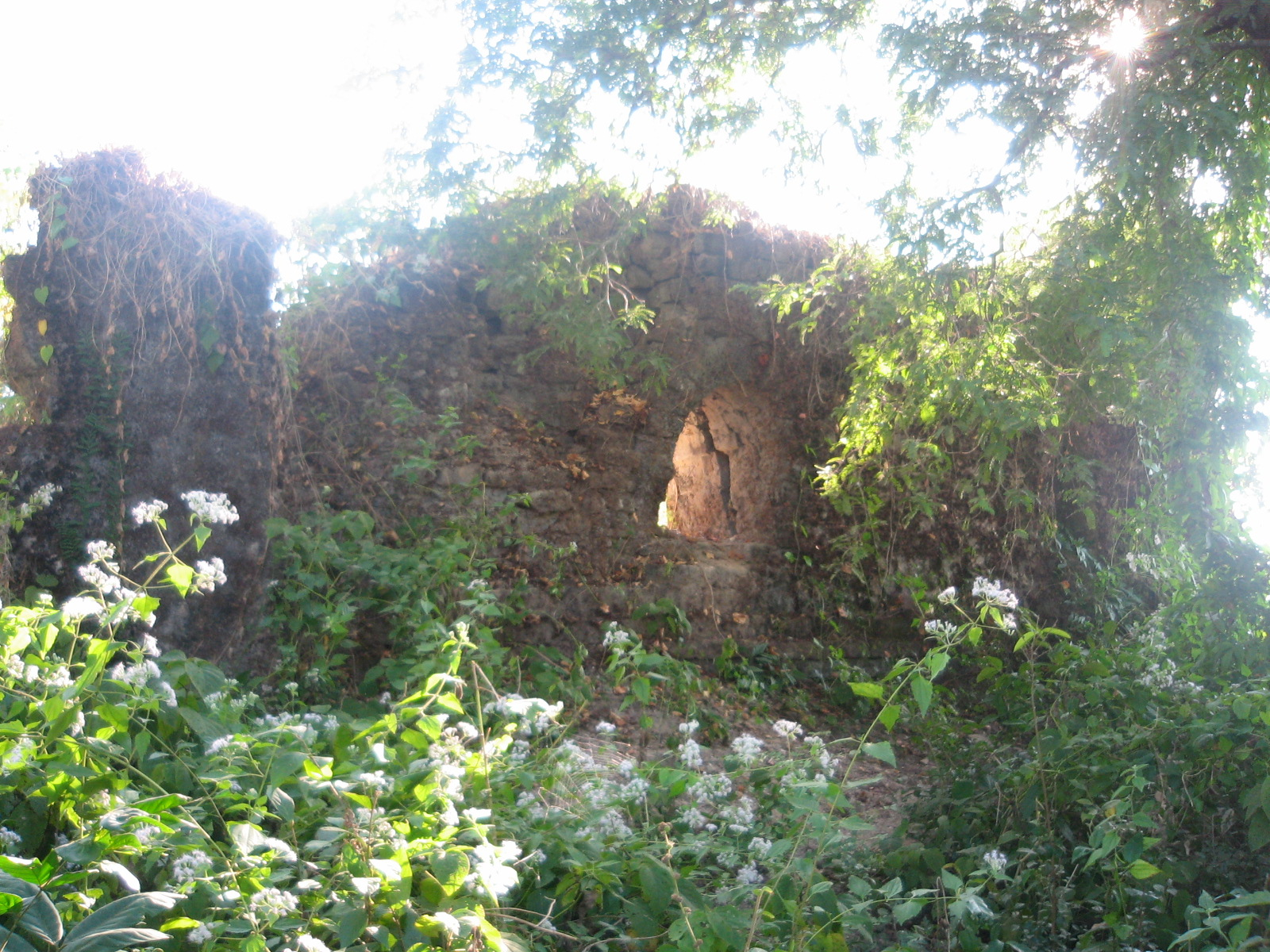
Ruins of Portuguese Trade Office

== See also ==
- Dhanyawadi
- Waithali
- Mrauk-U Archaeological Museum

== Bibliography ==
- The Land of the Great Image – Being Experiences of Friar Manrique in Arakan by Maurice Collis. ISBN 978-1406789867
- Pamela Gutman (2001) Burma's Lost Kingdoms: splendours of Arakan. Bangkok: Orchid Press, ISBN 978-0834804869

Mrauk U
Preceded by Launggyet	Capital of Mrauk-U Kingdom; 16 November 1430 – 2 January 1785	Succeeded by End of Mrauk U
