= Htukkanthein Temple =

Notable Buddhist temple in Mrauk U, Myanmar

Htukkanthein Temple Cross-Beam Ordination Hall
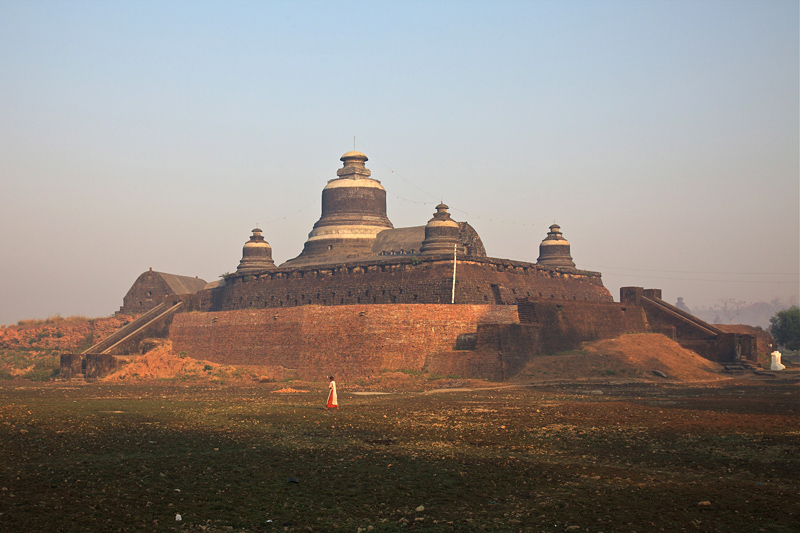
- Htukkanthein Temple

- Location within Burma

Religion
- Affiliation: Theravada Buddhism

Location
- Country: Myanmar
- Coordinates: 20°35′52″N 93°11′29″E

Architecture
- Founder: King Min Phalaung
- Completed: 1571; 455 years ago

Htukkanthein (Burmese: ထုက္ကန့်သိမ်; Burmese pronunciation: [tʰoʊʔka̰ɰ̃ θèɪɰ̃]) is one of the most famous Buddhist temples in the ancient Arakanese city of Mrauk U, in Rakhine State, Western Myanmar. The name means "Cross-Beam Ordination Hall".

Like most of Mrauk U's Buddhist temples, it is designed as a dual-purpose 'fortress-temple'. Although it is a 'thein' (ordination hall), it is one of the most militaristic buildings in Mrauk U, built on raised ground, with a single entrance and small windows. According to Emil Forchhammer, an archaeologist employed by the British Raj to study Mrauk U in the late 19th century, the temples might have been employed as a refuge for the Buddhist religious order in times of war.

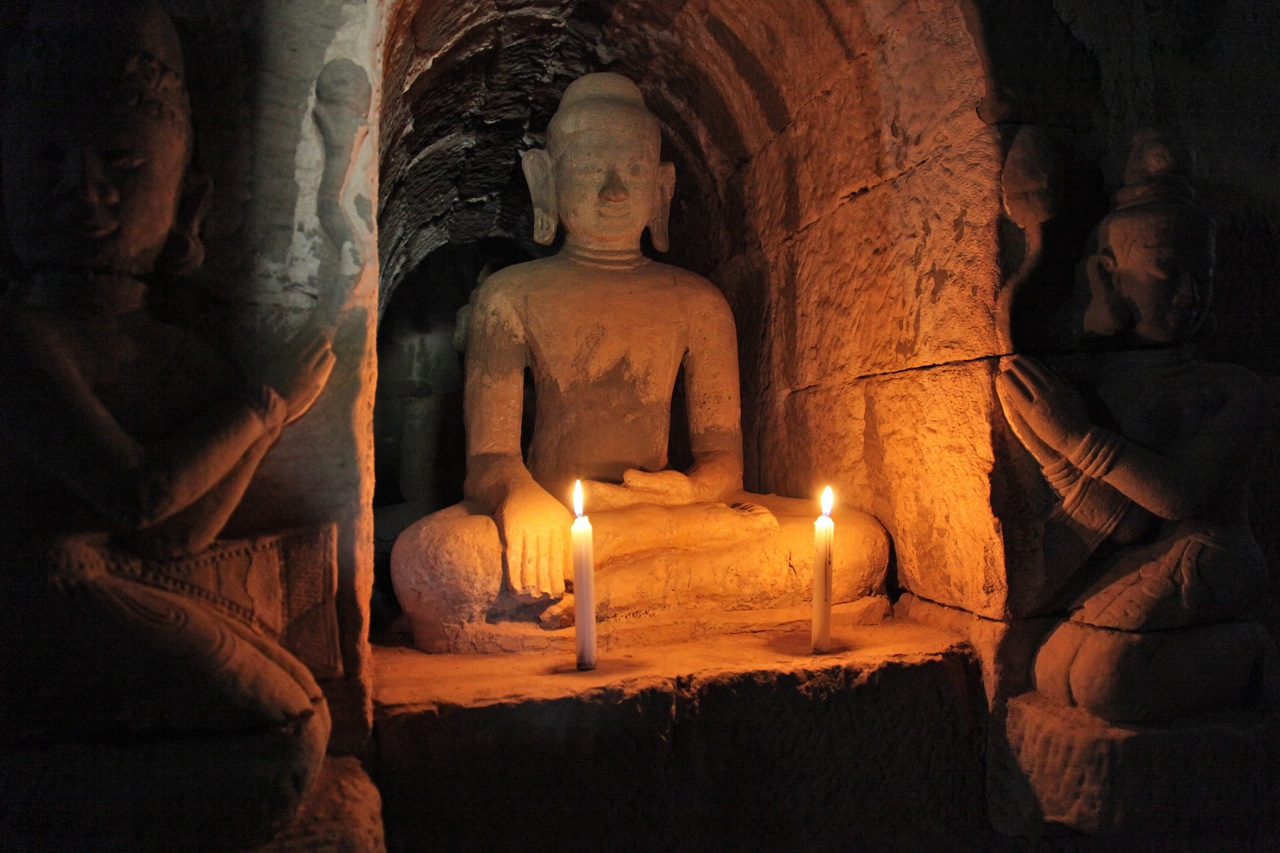
Buddha images flanked by donors sculpted in low relief

== History ==
The temple enshrining the statues of Buddha was built in 1571 by King Min Phalaung. It is located on a small hill a stone's throw away from the Shite-thaung Temple. At the centre of the temple is a dome topped with a mushroom shaped crown or hti, surrounded by four smaller stupas at the corners. At the facade base of the central dome is a square window designed in such a manner that, at dawn, the sun's rays shine directly onto the main Buddha image inside the central vault. At the west side of the temple is a small meditation chamber, accessible only via the main temple.

== Architecture ==
The temple is constructed of brick and stone.

The Htukkanthein has three chambers, rotating clockwise inwards. The entire temple has a total of 180 Buddha images in niches (179 smaller ones along the corridors, and 1 at the central vaulted chamber). On each side of the niches are sculpted male and a female figures said to represent the donors who made the construction of the temple possible.

== Inspiration ==
The temple has been claimed to be an inspiration of the ruins founded in Sanhok map of the mobile game PUBG.

== See also ==
- Shite-thaung Temple
- Andaw-thein Ordination Hall
- Koe-thaung Temple
- Le-myet-hna Temple
- Ratanabon Pagoda
