= Koe-thaung Temple =

Largest Buddhist temple in Mrauk U, Myanmar

Koe-Thaung ကိုးသောင်းဘုရား
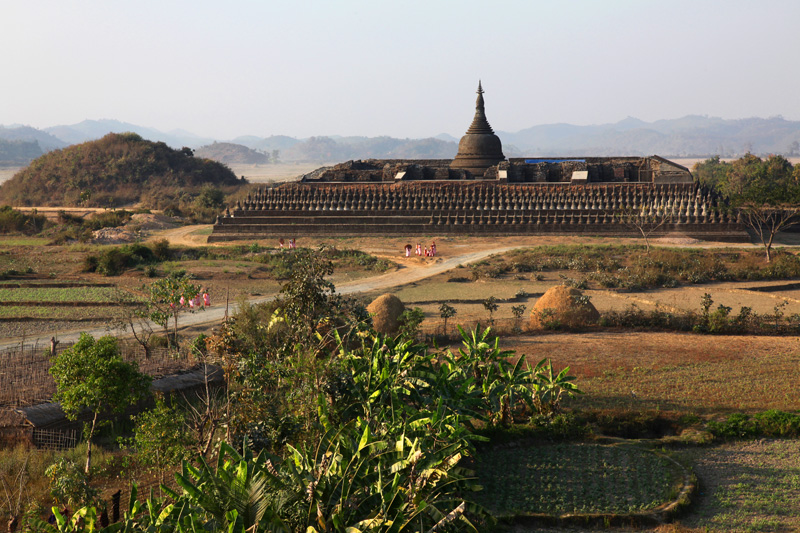
- The Koe-Thaung Temple

- Location within Burma

Religion
- Affiliation: Theravada

Location
- Country: Myanmar
- Coordinates: 20.59815°N 93.21097°E

Architecture
- Founder: Dikkha of Mrauk-U
- Completed: c. 1554–1556

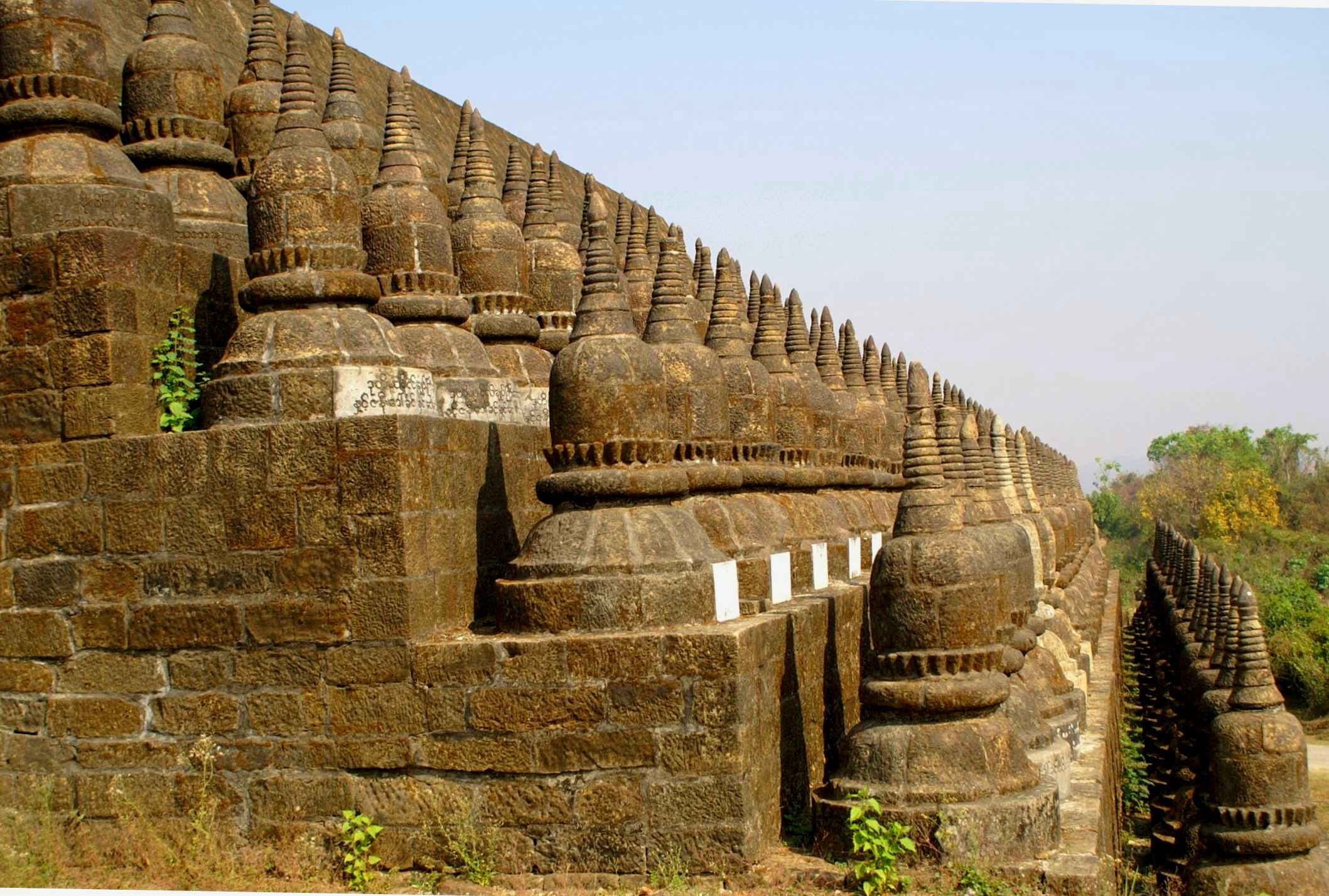
Closeup of the temple

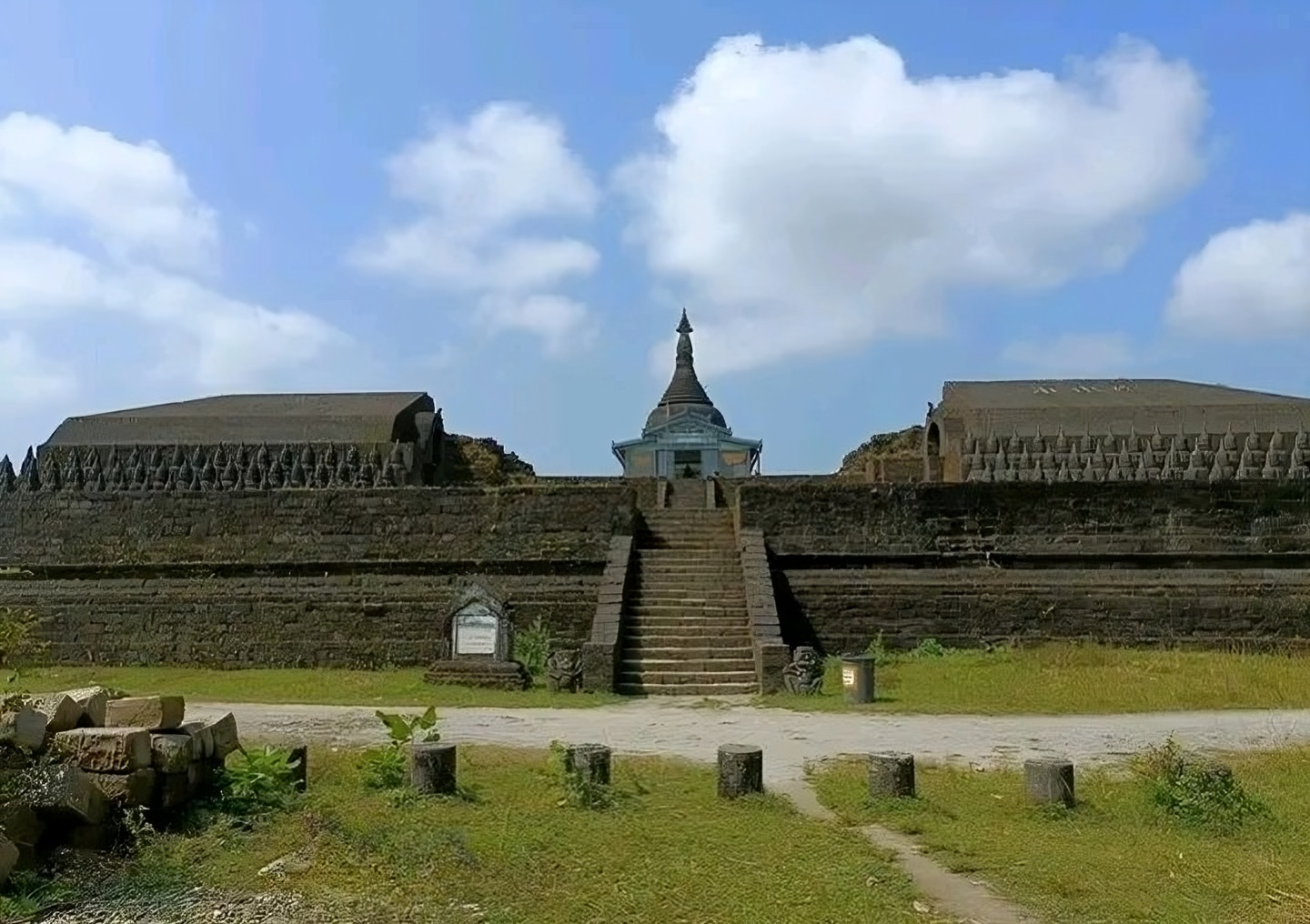
Entry view of the temple from far

Kouthaung (Burmese: ကိုးသောင်းဘုရား kui:saung:bhu.ra: [kóðáʊɰ̃ pʰəjá] Koùthaùñ hpăyà) is the largest Buddhist temple in Mrauk U, Myanmar. The name means "Temple of 90,000 Buddha Images". The temple was built between 1554 and 1556 by King Dikkha.

== History ==
Ko-Thoung Temple (the Temple of 90,000 Buddha Images) is the largest temple complex in the ancient capital of Mrauk-U, Rakhine. It is also sometimes referred to by some people as the "Rakhine Borobudur", Although Kouthaung is not as large as Indonesia's Borobudur temple in Java, which is the largest in the world, it is still significant in size.

Locals believe that hidden treasures remain buried beneath the ruins. According to legend, the temple was destroyed by a thunderbolt or lightning because the King built it with 90,000 Buddha images which surpassed his father's Shite Thaung Temple, which had 80,000.

A large number of bronzes and a magnificent sculpture of a seated Buddha from Ceylon (present day-Sri Lanka) suggest that there was a connection between the Kingdom of Arakan and the Sri Lankan Buddhist community in the 16th century.

== Architecture ==
Koe Thaung Temple in Mrauk-U has inner chambers filled with carved Buddha statues, each with unique facial details. The statues rest in niches partially covered in green lichen giving them an ancient look. Locals believe the temple once had nine terraces, but most collapsed over time, likely due to earthquakes. It was hidden under thick vegetation until its discovery in the 1980s, with the earthquakes following years later.

The temple has four entrances, one on each cardinal point. The main eastern entrance leads into a long vaulted passageway that spirals inward to a central chamber. Along this passage, large Buddha statues sit on tiered stone pedestals on both sides.

Koe Thaung's structure resembles a rock cave tunnel. Its main tower is octagonal. The temple's design features a maze-like passage leading to the central chamber, where a large bell-shaped stupa stands. The corridor walls are decorated with thousands of small bas-relief Buddha images, with larger seated Buddhas in the Bhūmisparśa mudrā pose.

Unlike the Shite Thaung Temple, which is made of pure sandstone, Koe Thaung is built with both sandstone and bricks, making it lower in quality.

== Photo gallery ==
Koe-thaung Temple - ကိုးသောင်းဘုရား

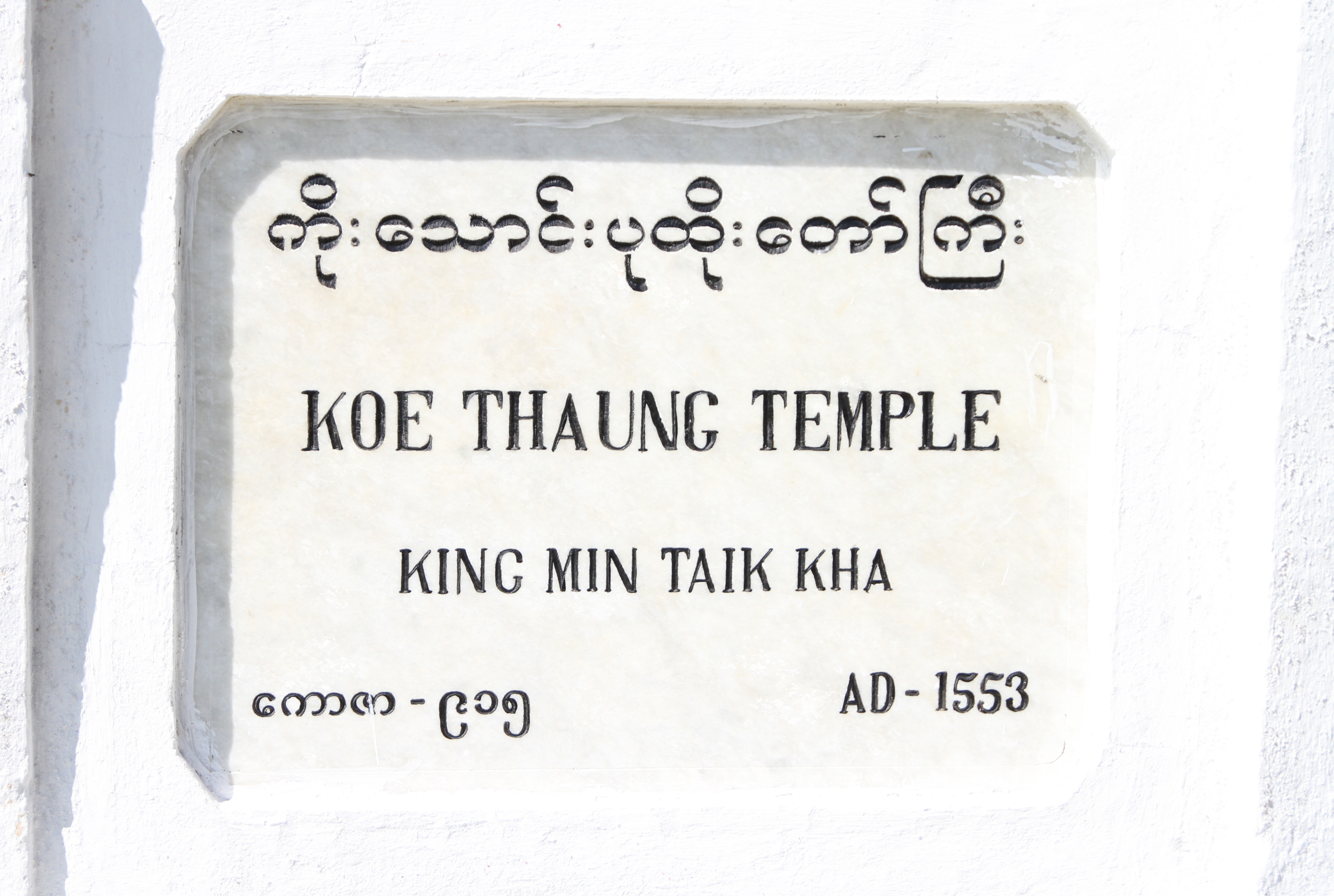

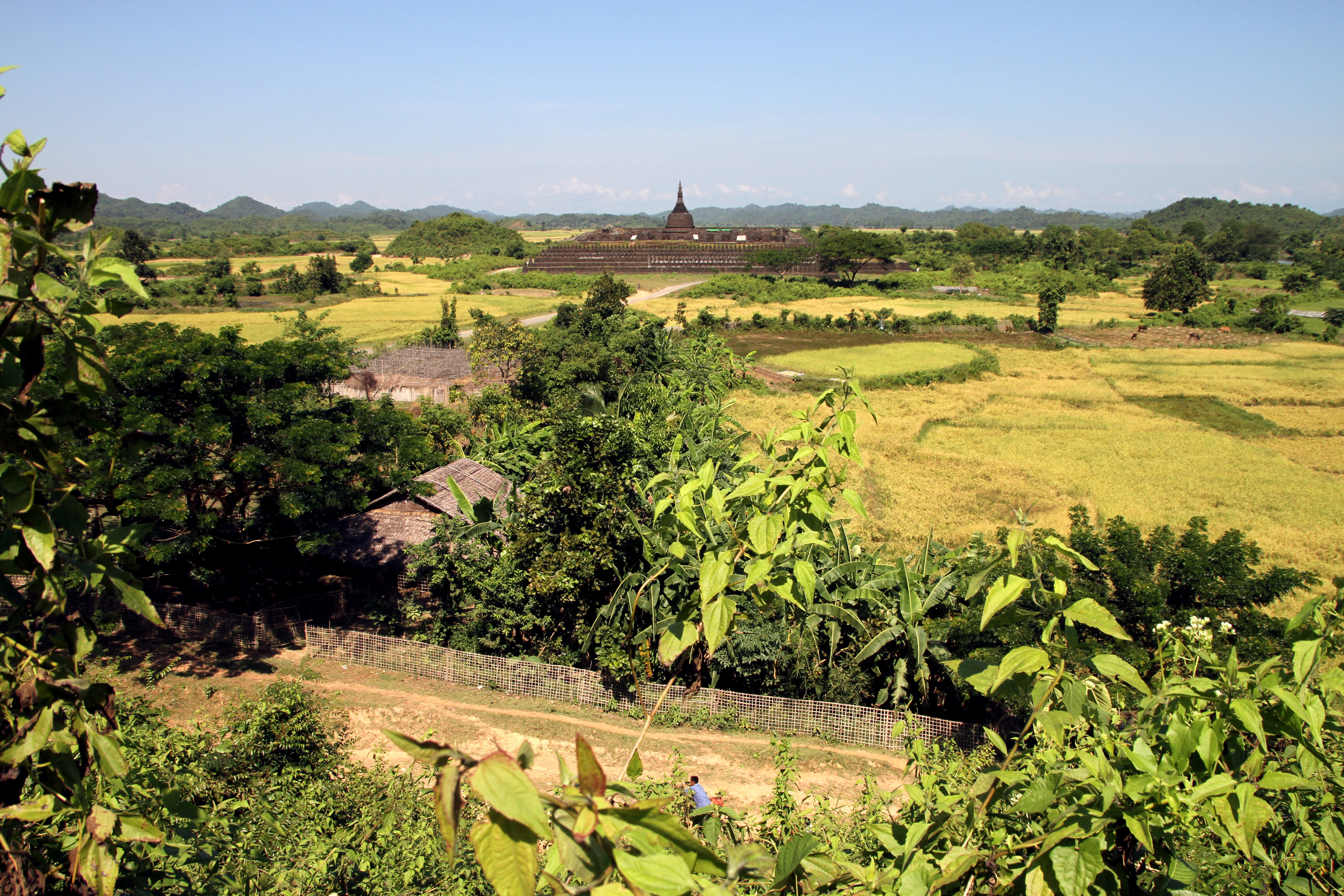

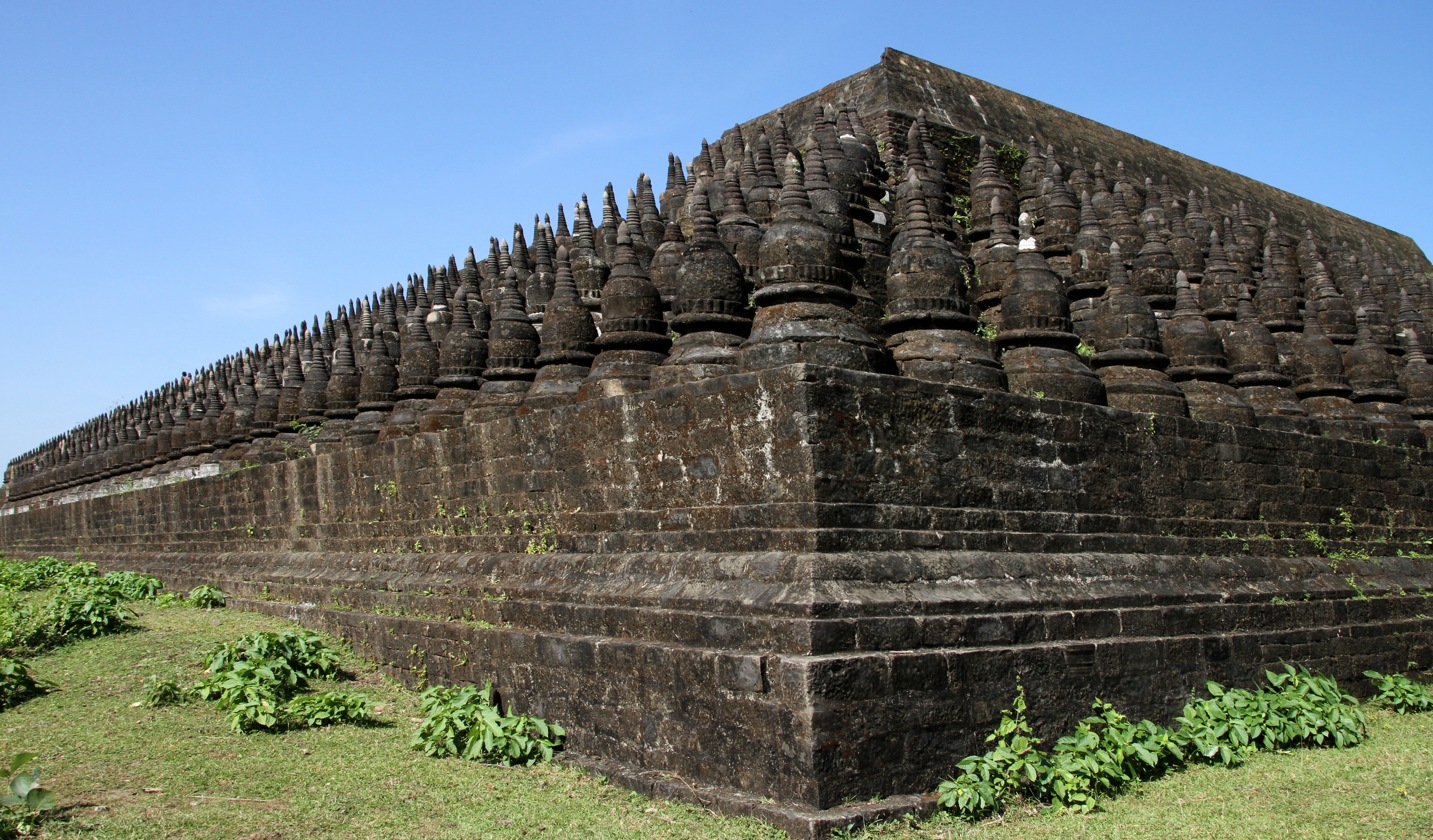

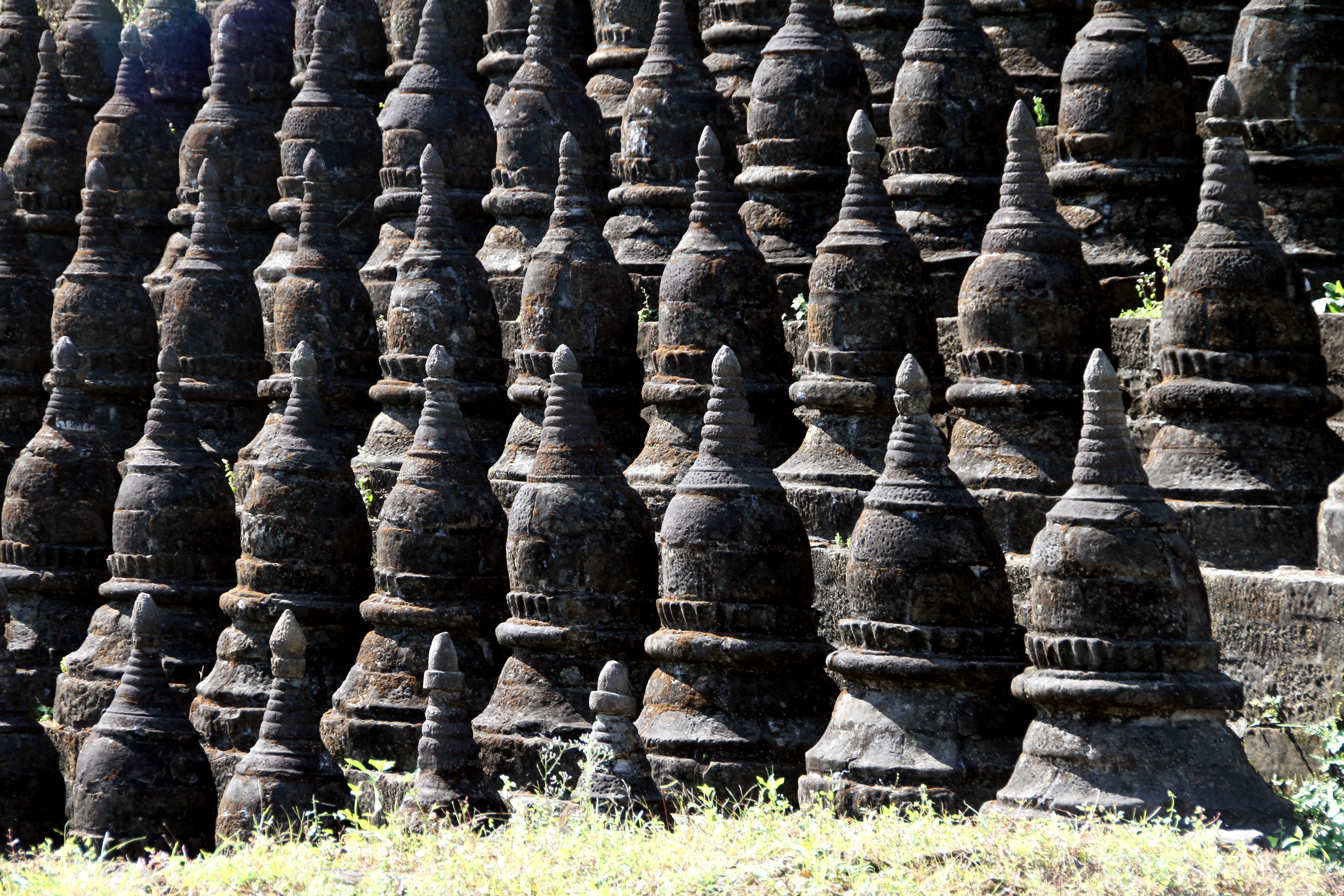

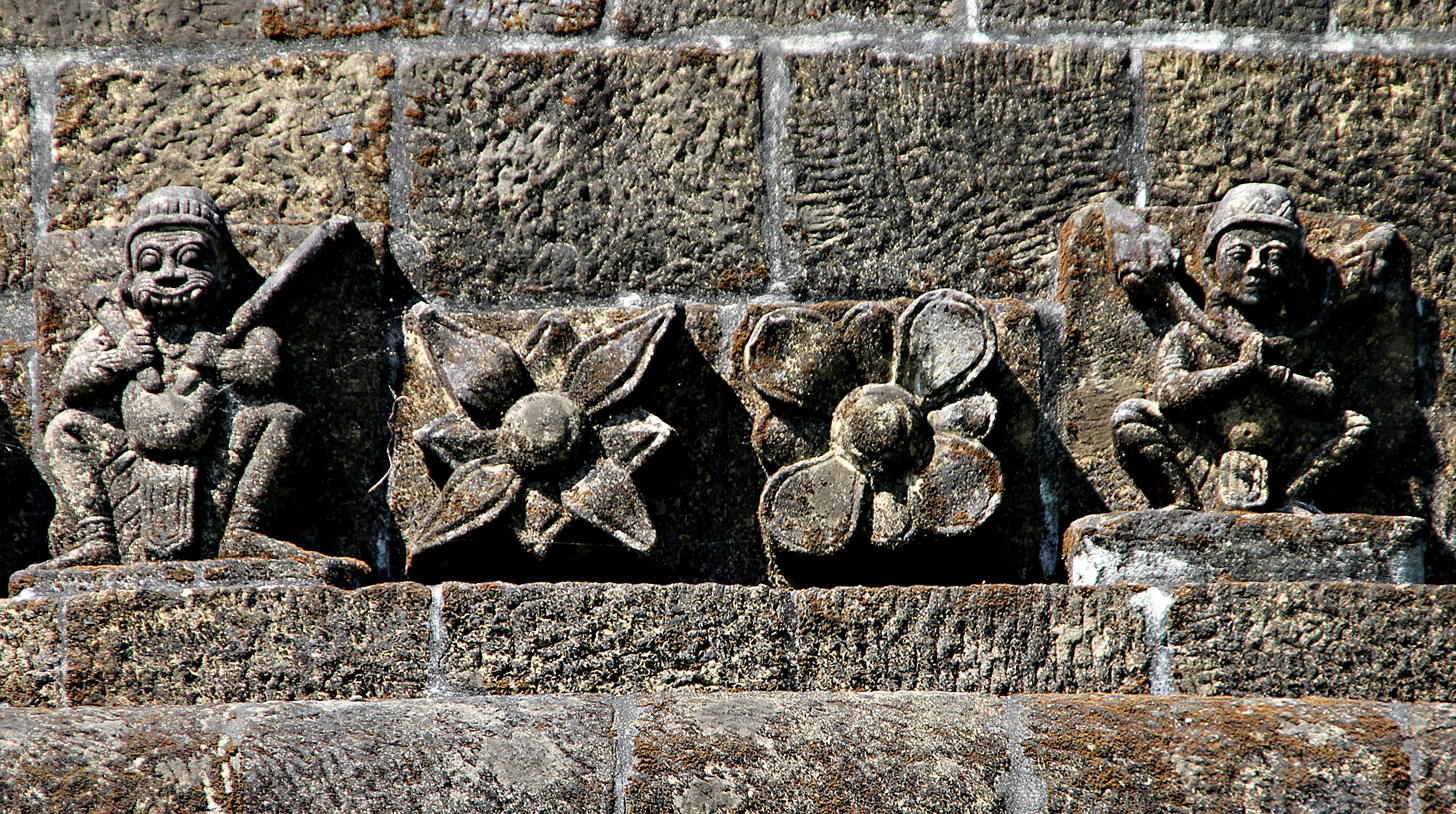

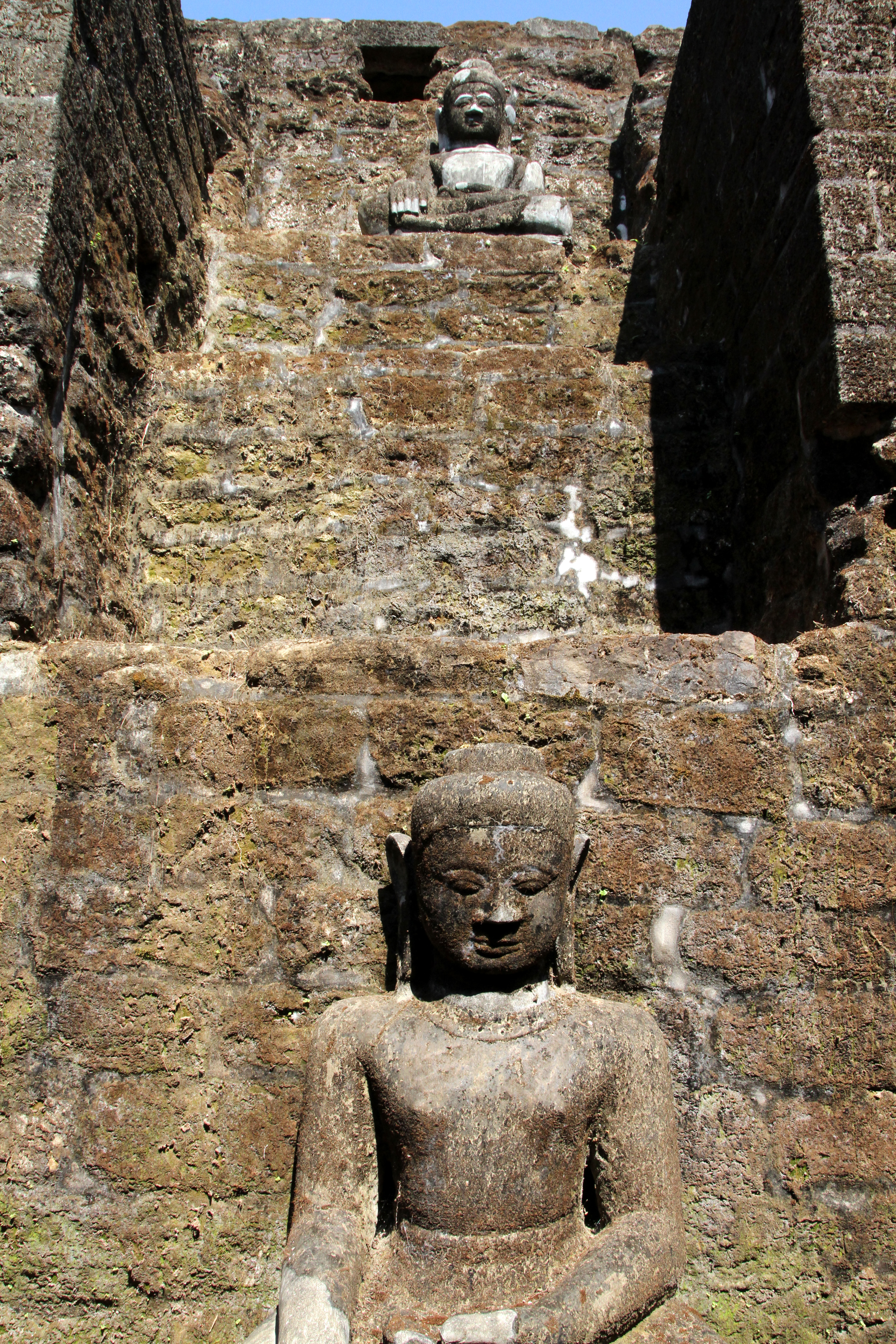

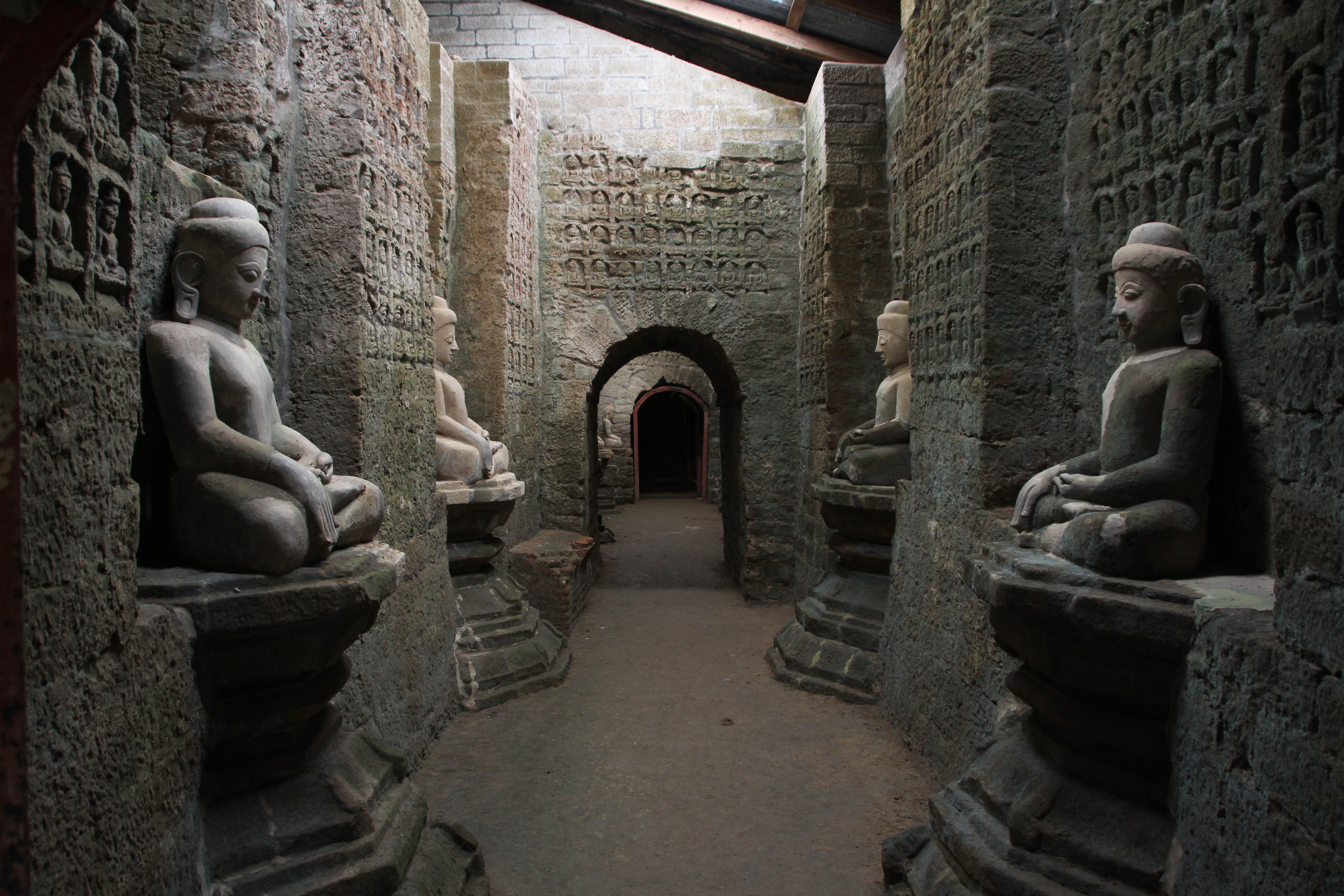

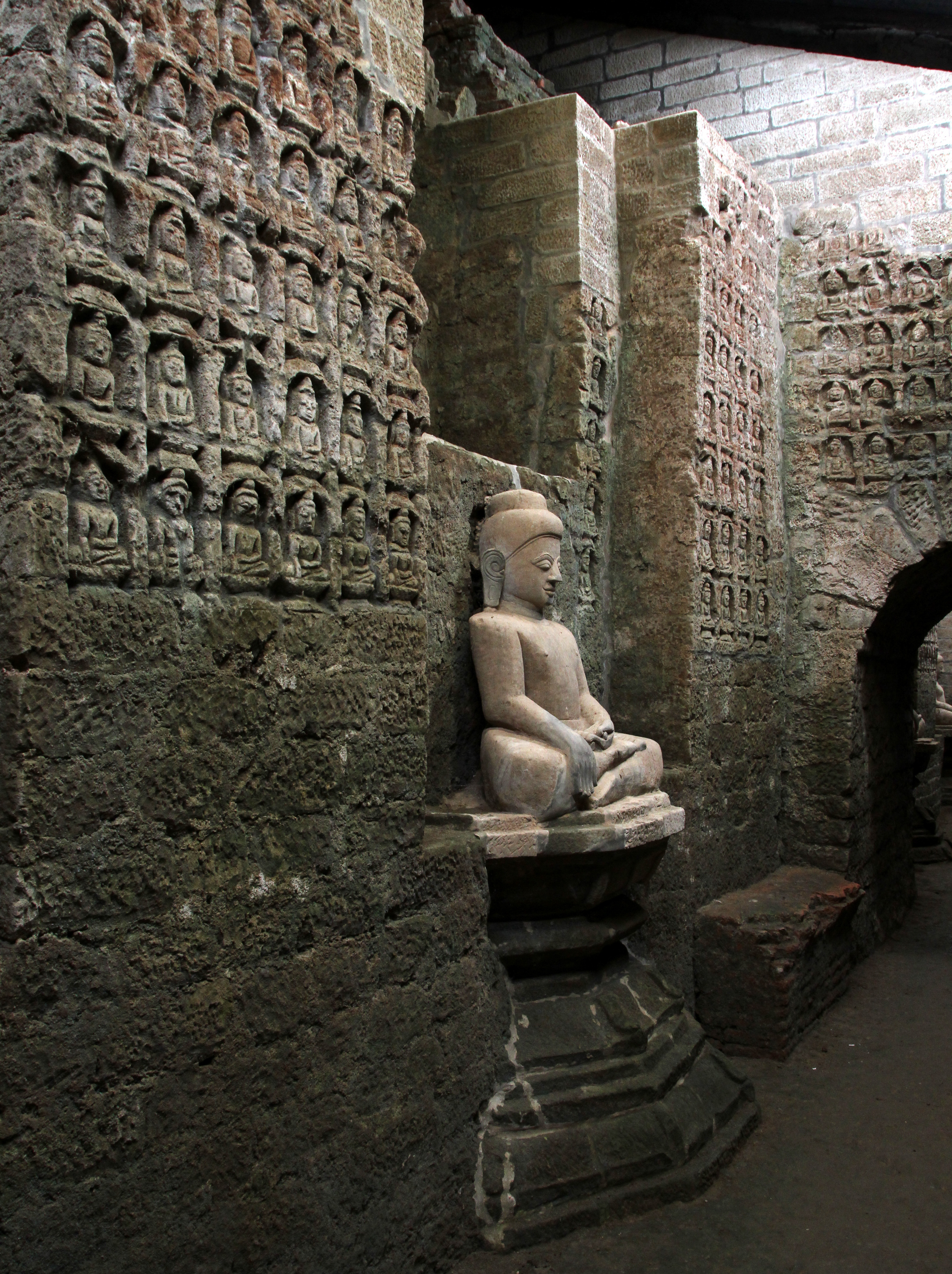

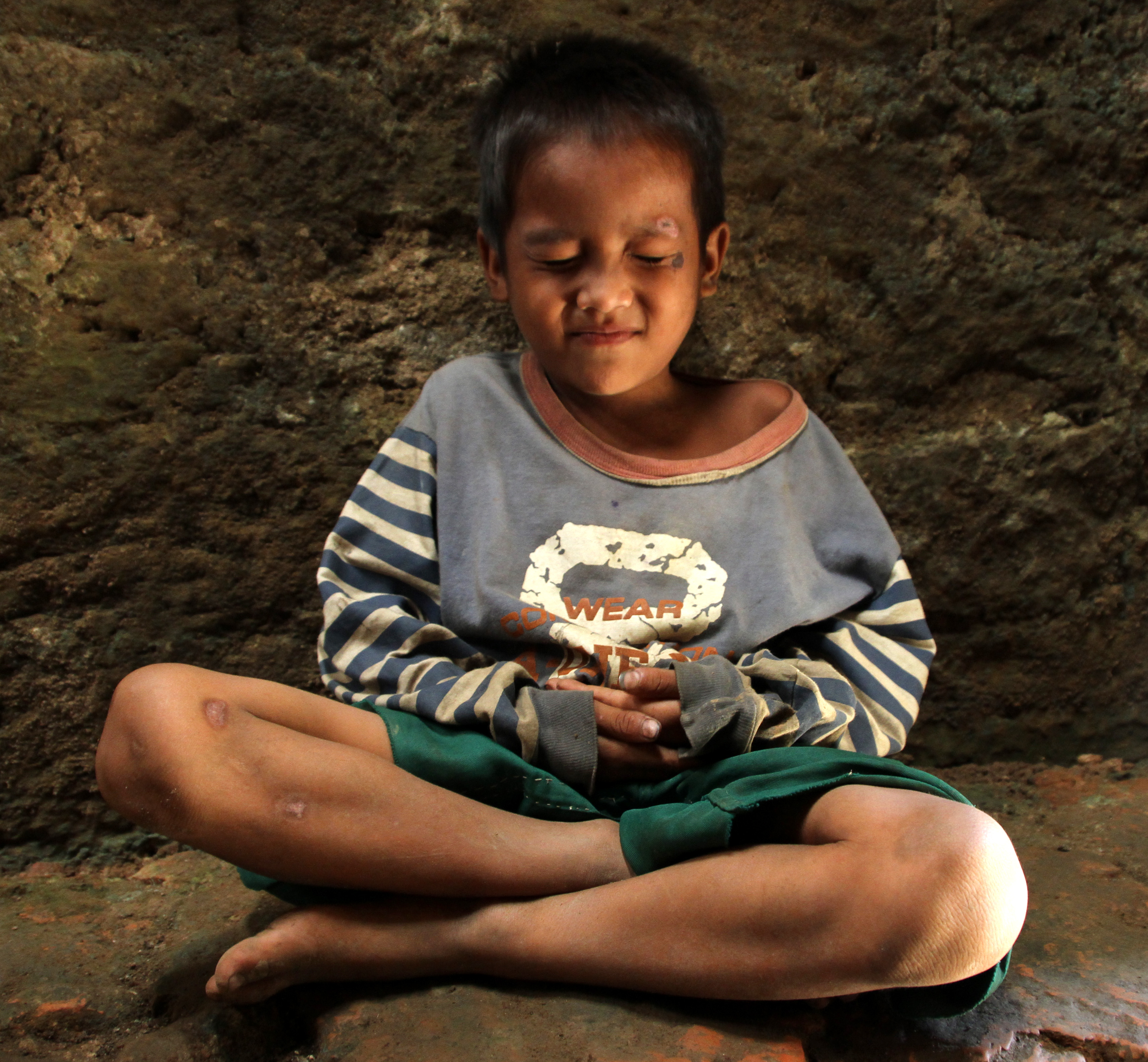

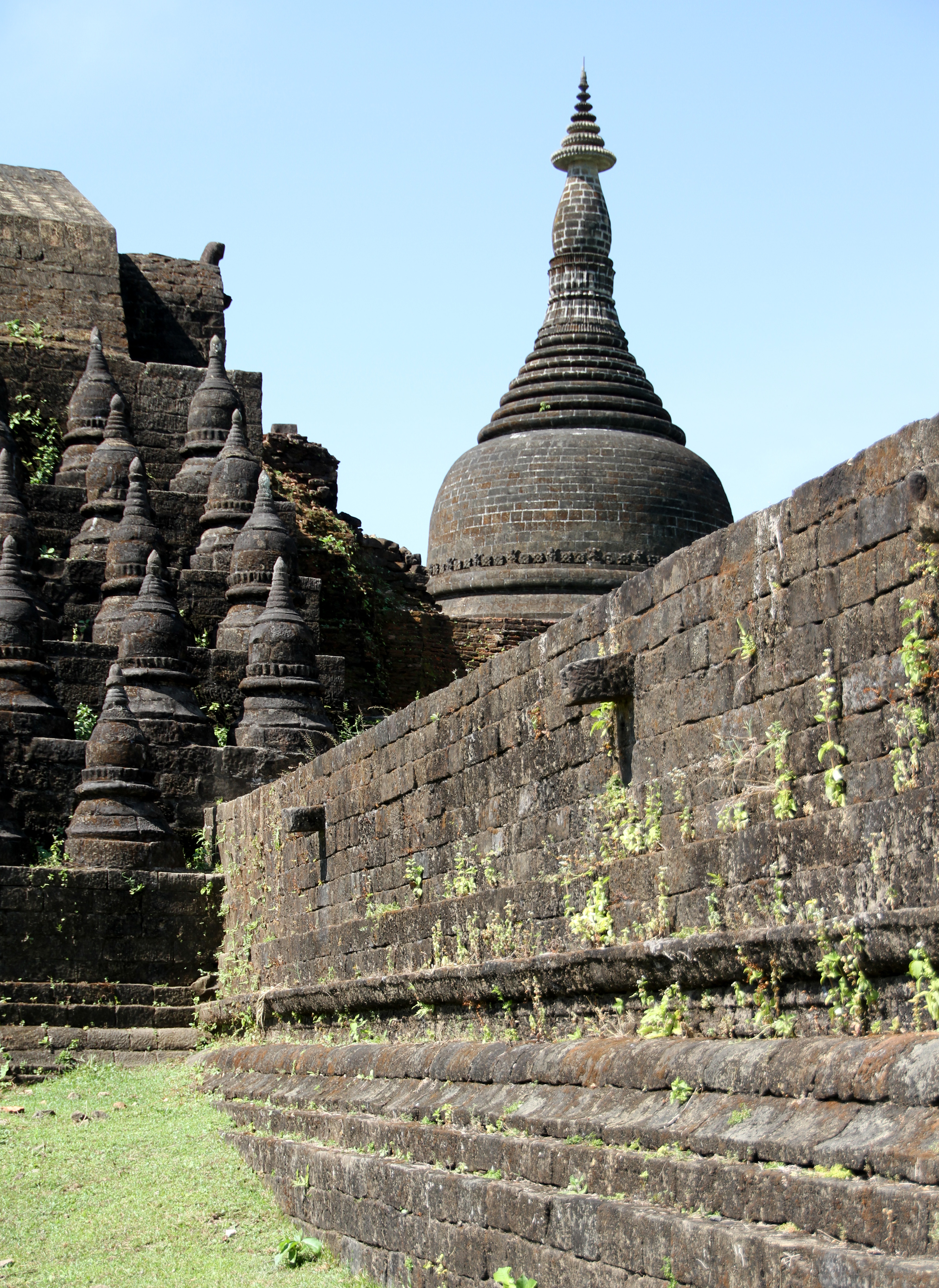

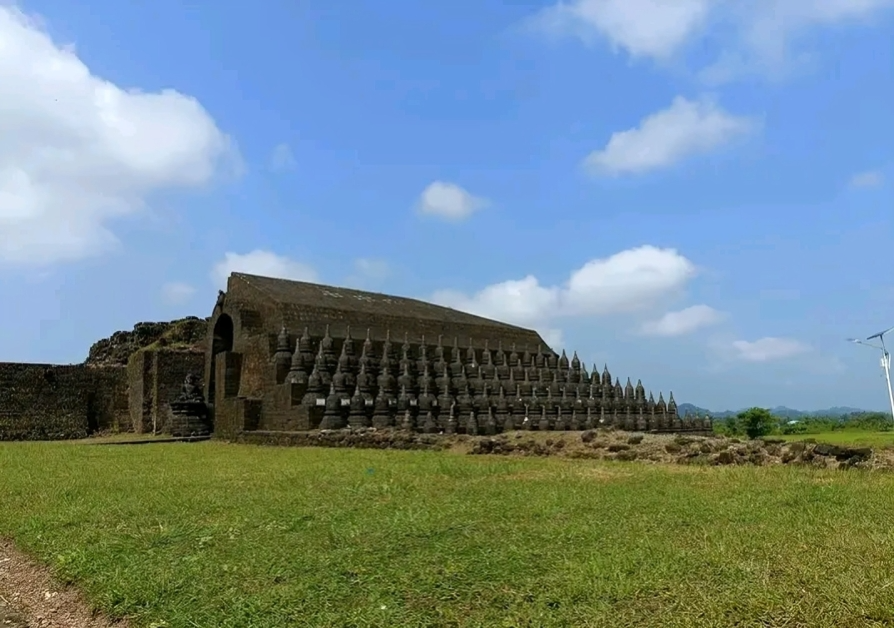

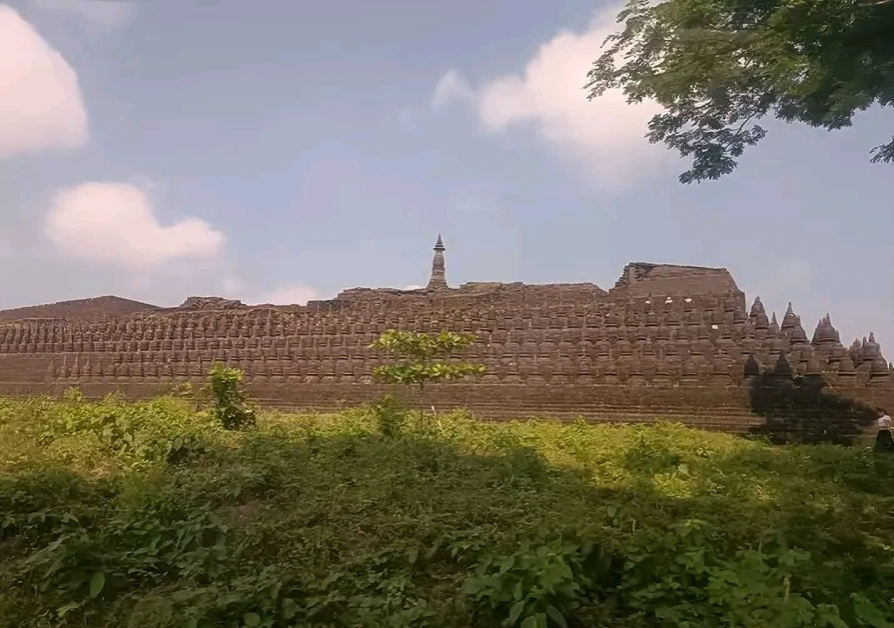

== See also ==
- Shite-thaung Temple
- Htukkanthein Temple
- Andaw-thein Ordination Hall
- Le-myet-hna Temple
- Ratanabon Pagoda
- List of Buddhist temples in Myanmar

== Bibliography ==
- Gutman, Pamela (2001). Burma's Lost Kingdoms: Splendours of Arakan. Bangkok: Orchid Press. ISBN 974-8304-98-1.
