= Ratanabon Pagoda =

Buddhist pagoda in Mrauk U, Myanmar

Ratanabon Temple
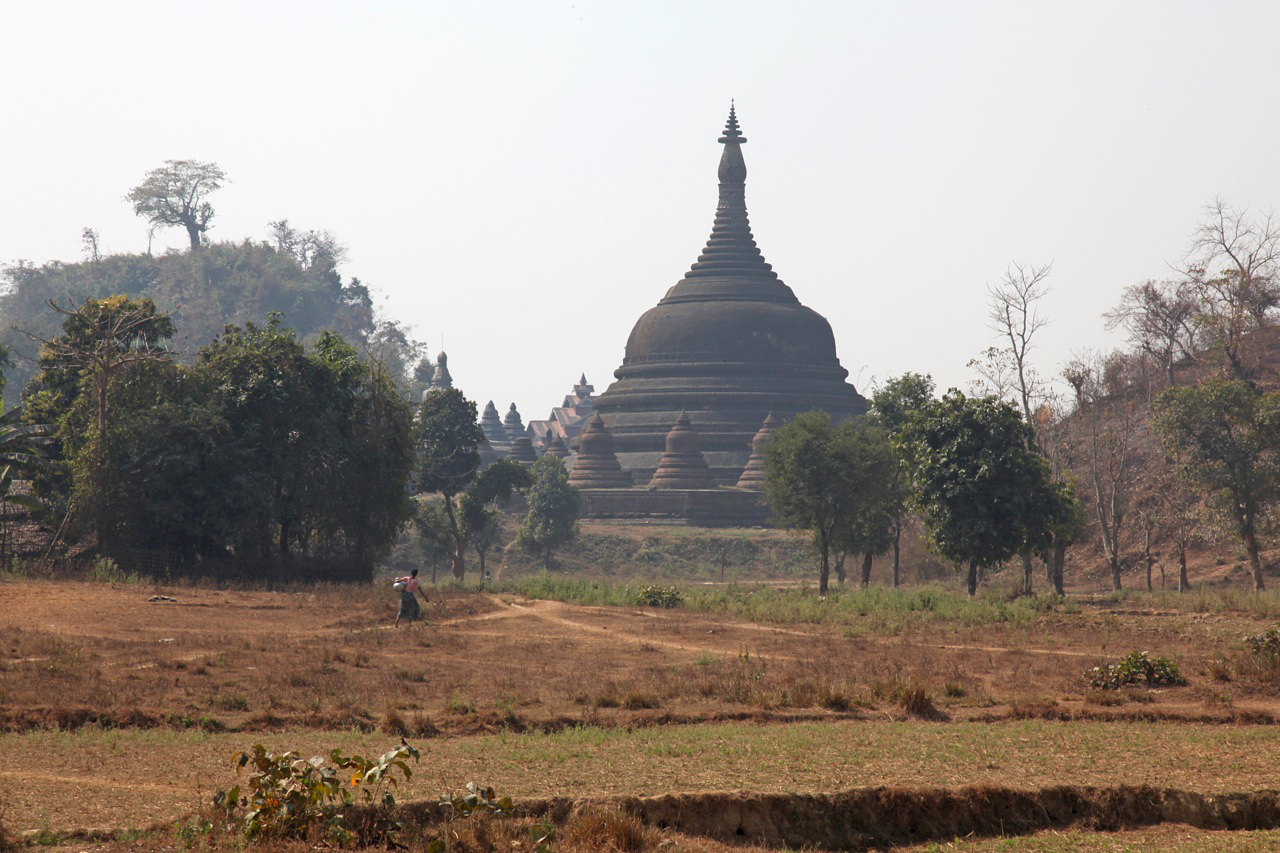

- Location within Myanmar

Religion
- Affiliation: Theravada Buddhism

Location
- Location: Mrauk U, Rakhine State
- Country: Myanmar
- Coordinates: 20.598833°N 93.193698°E

Architecture
- Founder: Min Khamaung
- Completed: 1612; 414 years ago

Ratanabon Temple (Burmese: ရတနာပုံဘုရား [jɛ̀dənàbòʊɰ̃ pʰəjá], lit. 'pile of jewels') is a solid Buddhist stupa in Mrauk U, Rakhine State, Western Myanmar. The pagoda is located at the northeast corner of the Shite-thaung Temple.

According to local legends, it has jewels and images enshrined in the central stupa, but none have ever been found.

It was built in 1612 by King Min Khamaung and his wife.

== Photo gallery ==
Ratanabon in Mrauk U

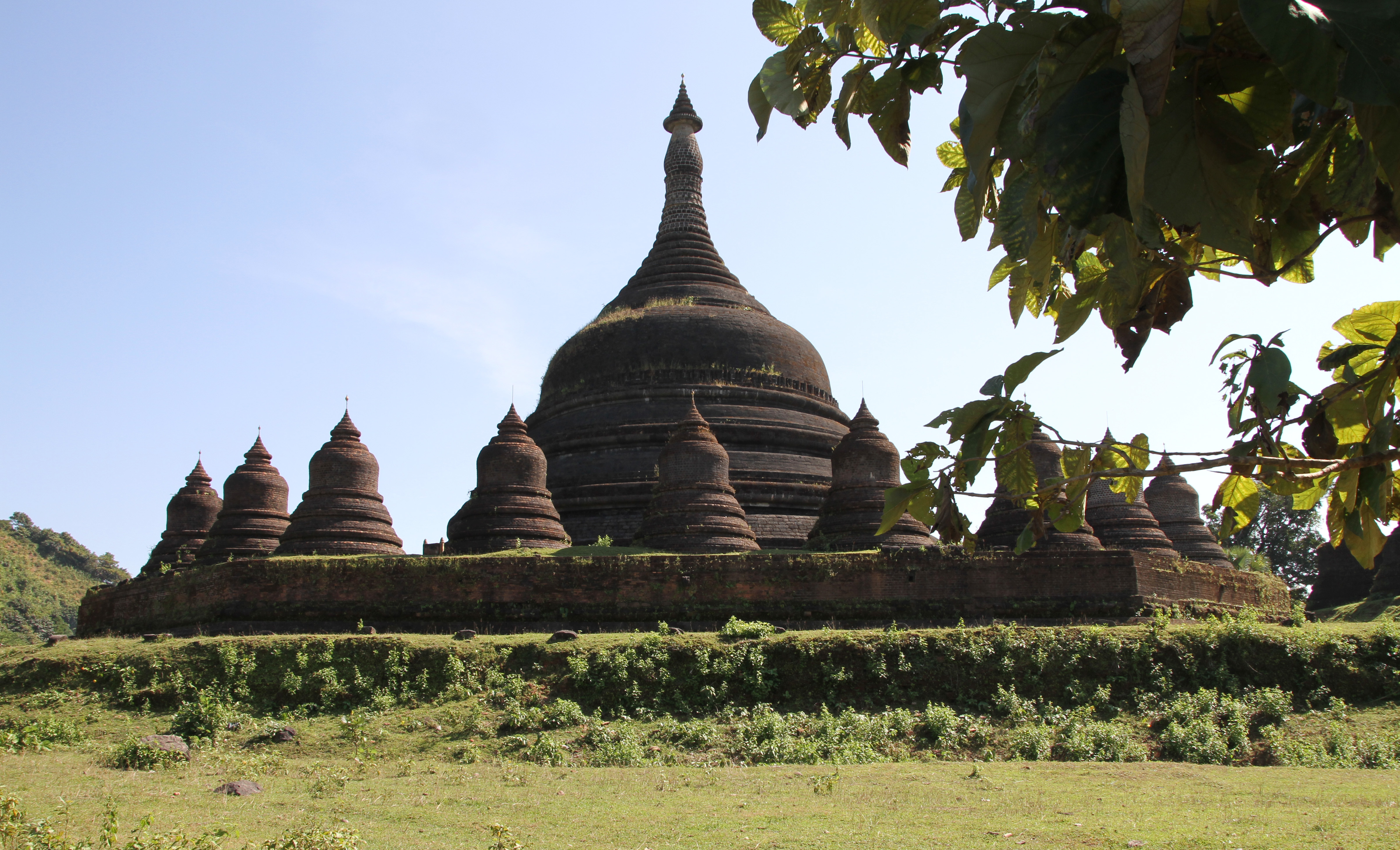

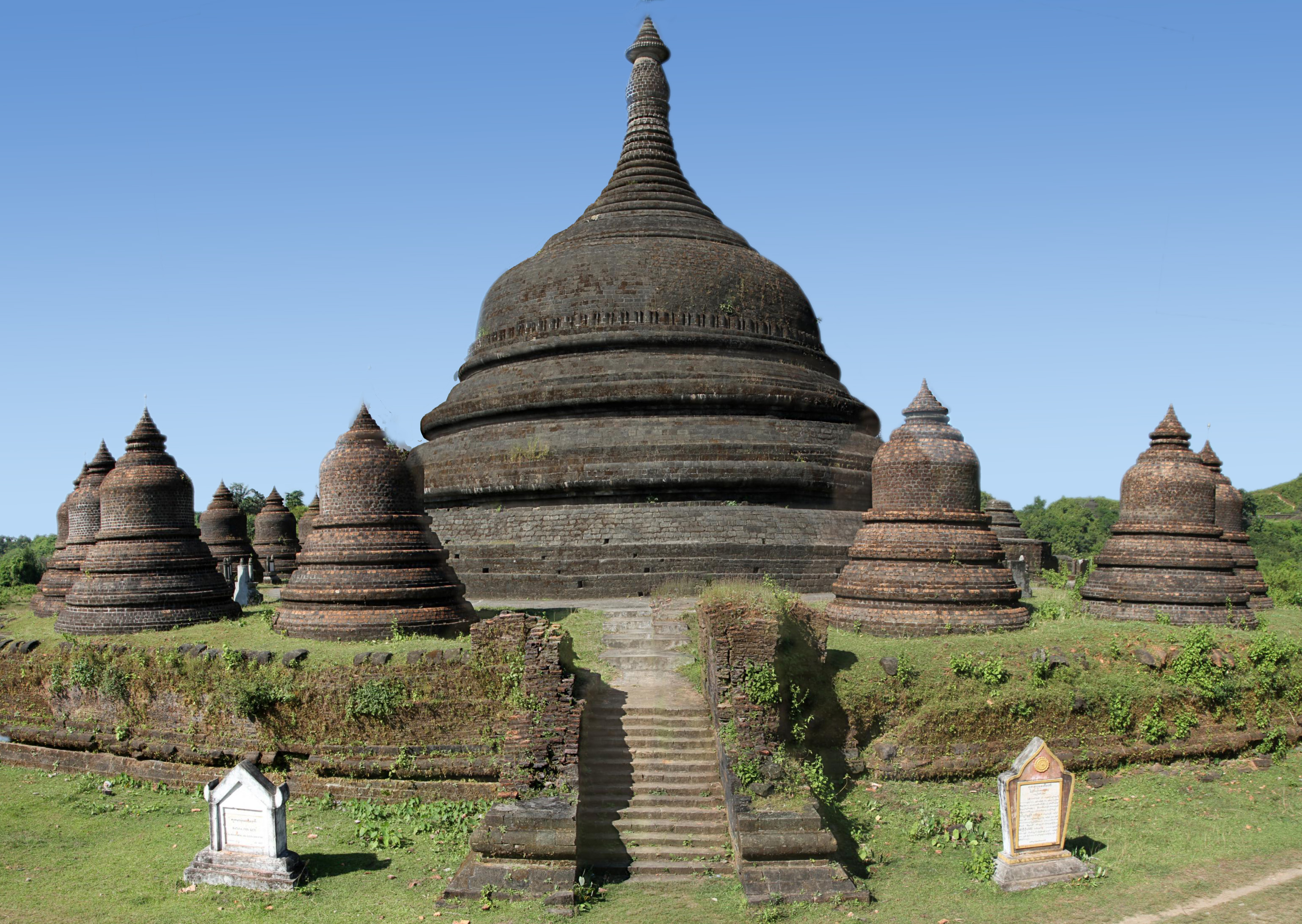

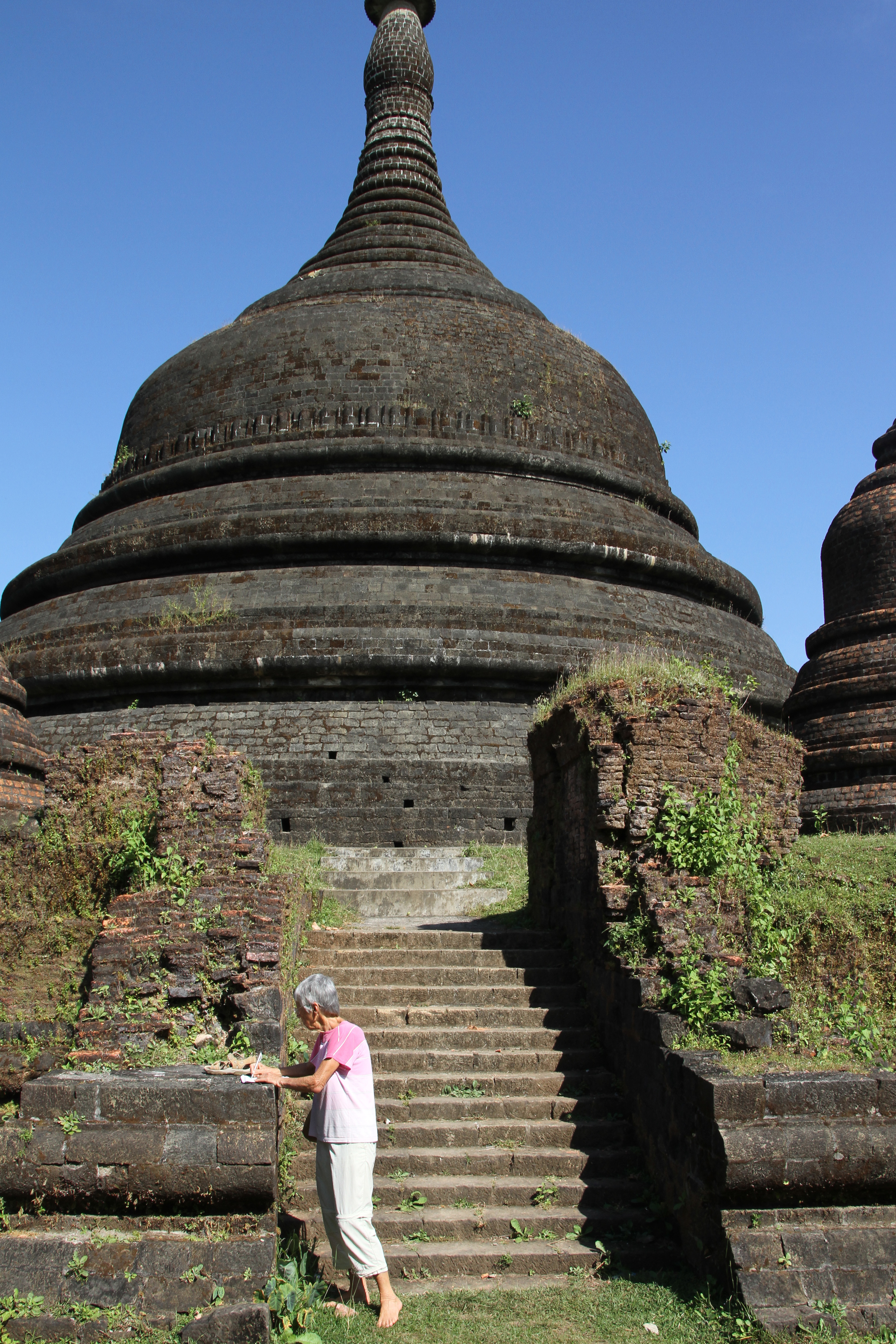

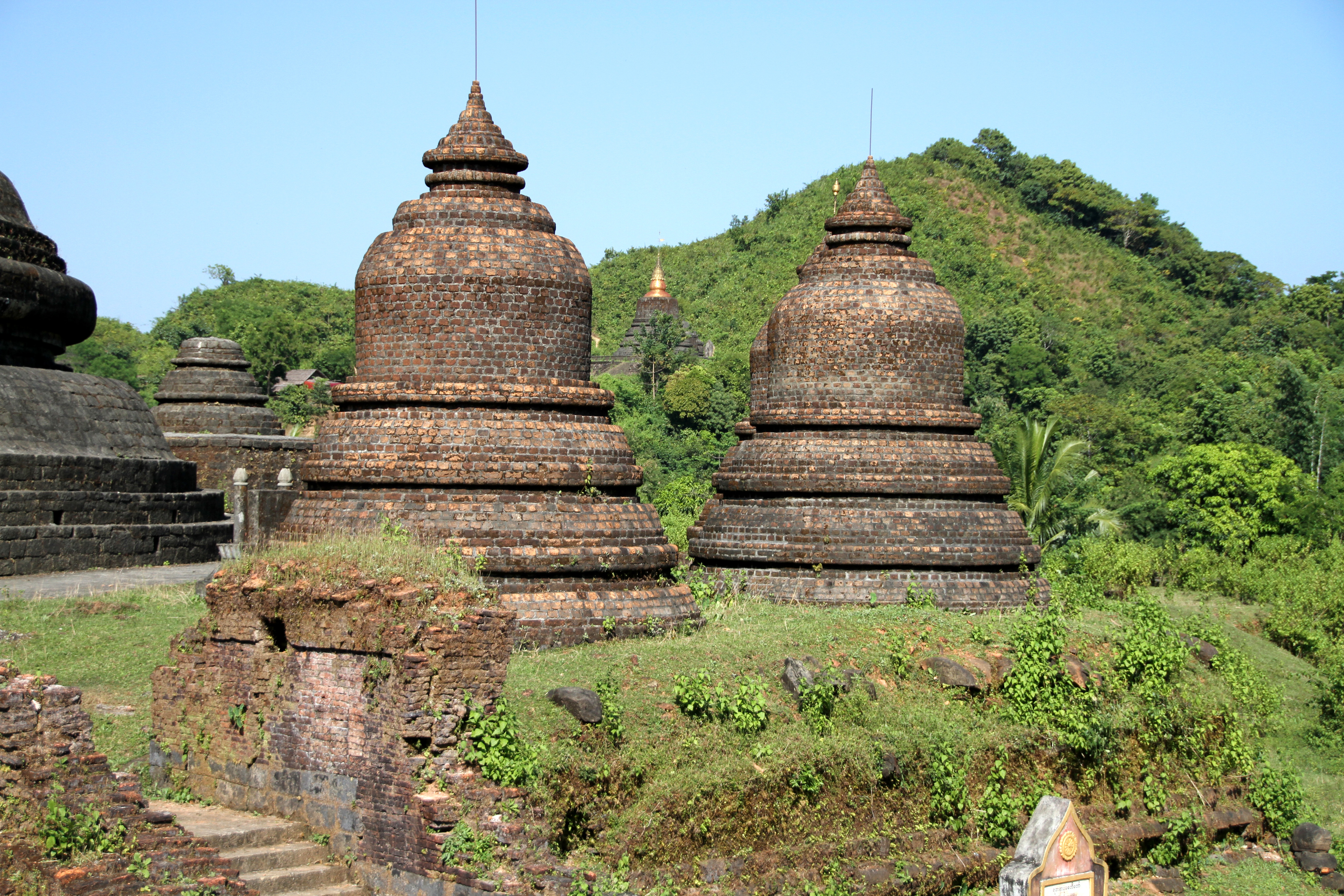

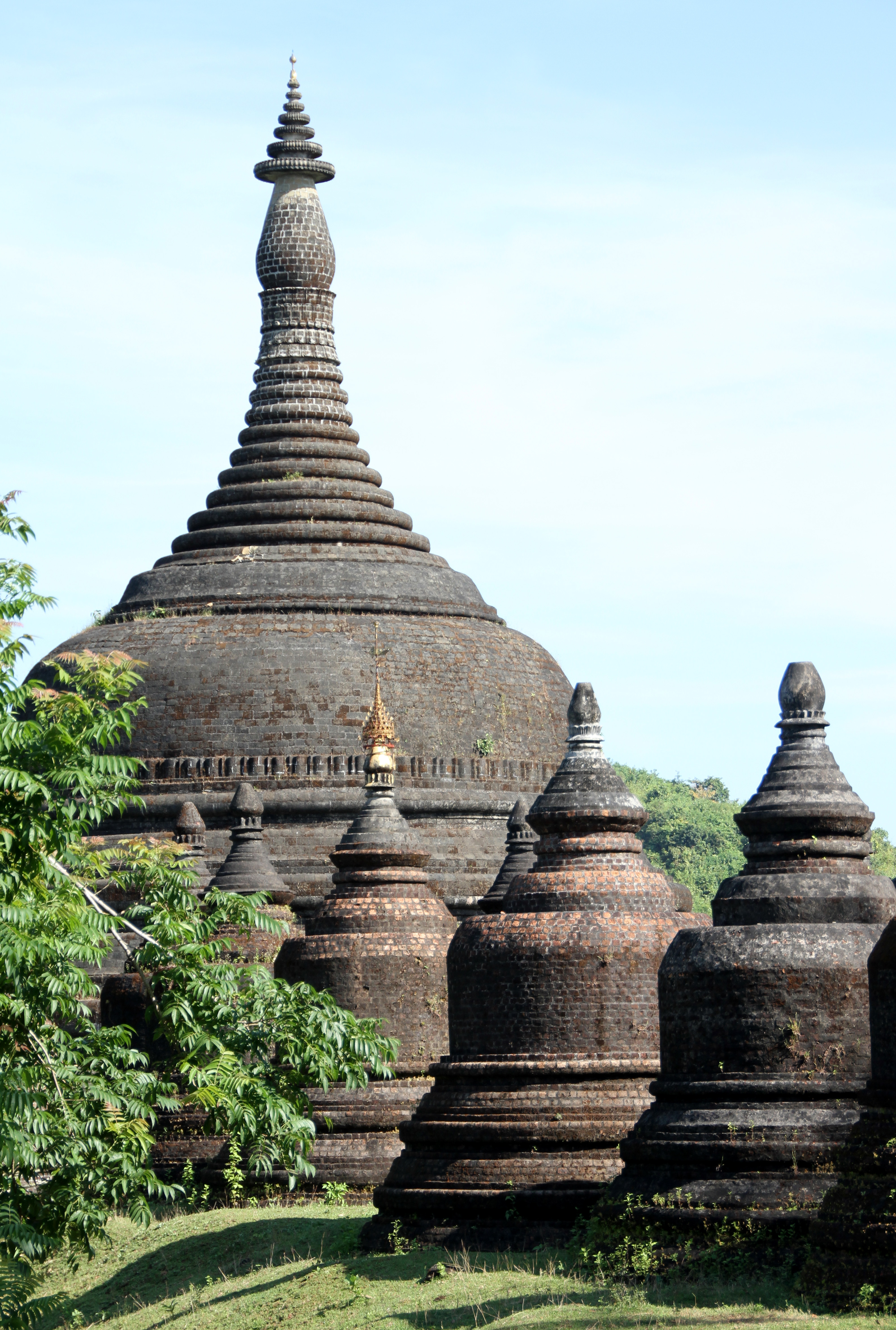
View from Andaw

== See also ==
- Shite-thaung Temple
- Htukkanthein Temple
- Koe-thaung Temple
- Andaw-thein Ordination Hall
- Le-myet-hna Temple
- Mrauk U
- List of Temples in Mrauk U
