= Mrauk-U Archaeological Museum =

Mrauk U Archaeological Museum
- Established: 1904/1930s
- Location: Mrauk U, Rakhine State, Myanmar
- Coordinates: 20.5898°N 93.1925°E
- Type: Archaeological museum

The Mrauk U Archaeological Museum (Burmese: မြောက်ဦးရှေးဟောင်းသုသေတနပြတိုက်) is a cultural museum located in the Nanyarkone ward of Mrauk U, Rakhine State, Myanmar. It was established originally in 1904 to preserve and display the artifacts from the historical Kingdom of Mrauk U (1430–1785). The museum is situated next to the House-of-Jewels site. It is more than 90 years old.

== History ==
According to historical records, the museum was first established around 1932–33 with about ten ancient Rakhine stone sculptures and inscriptions displayed in a ground-level building at its current site.

Later, with the efforts of a Rakhine scholar U Oo Tha Tun and a number of archaeological artifacts collected, the building was expanded in 1958 into a 20-by-60-foot structure roofed with corrugated iron and enclosed with iron bars. In 1967, the iron bars were replaced with brick walls, and in 1977–78 an office building connected to the museum was constructed. As more artifacts were discovered and collected, another building was added in 1981–82.

By September 2022, the interior decoration work at the museum reached 90% completion for a UNESCO field visit. The museum was upgraded and repaired in that month by the Department of Archaeology and National Museum of Myanmar with a budget of 10 million kyats.

In September 2023, it was announced to be relocated. In December 2023, the museum was damaged by artillery shells fired by the Junta military's 540th and 377th battalions during Arakan Army offensive.

== Features ==
The museum houses ancient stone inscriptions and cultural artifacts connected to successive Rakhine kingdoms from the Dhanyawadi, Waithali, Lemro, and Mrauk-U kingdoms. The Mrauk-U heritage site is also recognized under the UNESCO World Heritage Convention.

Inside the museum, there is a range of historical items, including ancient coins, pottery, sculptures, and artworks from the Mrauk U period. It also contains ancient stone inscriptions, manuscripts, including information about the culture and daily life of the people who once lived in Mrauk U.

== See also ==
- List of museums in Myanmar
  - List of museums in Yangon
- Rakhine State Cultural Museum
