= Bagan =

UNESCO historical city in Mandalay Region, Myanmar

Bagan ပုဂံ Pagan
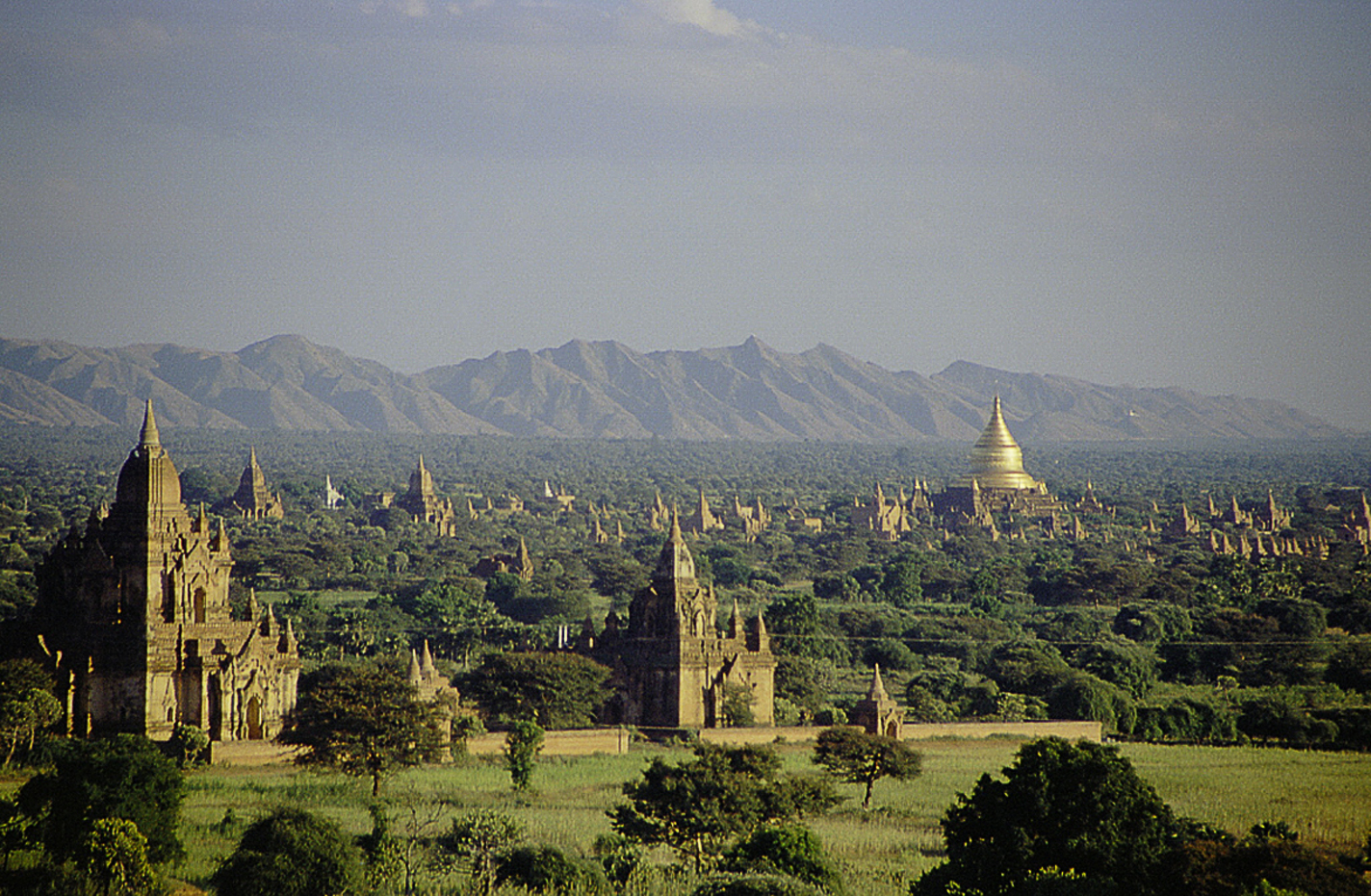
- Temples and pagodas in Bagan

- Location of Bagan, Myanmar
- Coordinates: 21°10′21″N 94°51′36″E
- Country: Myanmar
- Region: Mandalay Region
- Founded: mid-to-late 9th century

Area
  - Total: 104 km^{2} (40 sq mi)

Population
  - Ethnicities: Bamar people
  - Religions: Theravada Buddhism
- Time zone: UTC+6.30 (MST)
- Website

UNESCO World Heritage Site
- Official name: Bagan
- Location: Mandalay Region, Myanmar
- Criteria: Cultural: iii, iv, vi
- Reference: 1588
- Inscription: 2019 (43rd Session)
- Area: 5,005.49 ha (12,368.8 acres)
- Buffer zone: 18,146.83 ha (44,841.8 acres)

Bagan (/bəˈɡæn/ bə-GAN; Burmese: ပုဂံ Băgam [bəɡàɰ̃]; formerly Pagan) is a medieval city and a UNESCO World Heritage Site in the Mandalay Region of Myanmar. From the 9th to 13th centuries, the city was the capital of the Pagan Kingdom, the first kingdom that unified the regions that would later constitute Myanmar. During the kingdom's height between the 11th and 13th centuries, more than 10,000 Buddhist temples, pagodas and monasteries were constructed in the Bagan plains alone, of which the remains of over 2,300 temples and pagodas survive.

The Bagan Archaeological Zone is a main attraction for the country's nascent tourism industry.

== Etymology ==
Bagan is the present-day standard Burmese pronunciation of the Burmese word Pugan (ပုဂံ), derived from Old Burmese Pukam (ပုဂန်). Its classical Pali name is Arimaddanapura (အရိမဒ္ဒနာပူရ, lit. "the City that Tramples on Enemies"). Its other names in Pali are in reference to its extreme dry zone climate: Tattadesa (တတ္တဒေသ, "parched land") and Tampadīpa (တမ္ပဒီပ, "bronzed country"). The Burmese chronicles also report other classical names of Thiri Pyissaya (သီရိပစ္စယာ; Pali: Siripaccaya) and Tampawaddy (တမ္ပဝတီ; Pali: Tampavatī).

== History ==
=== 9th to 13th centuries ===
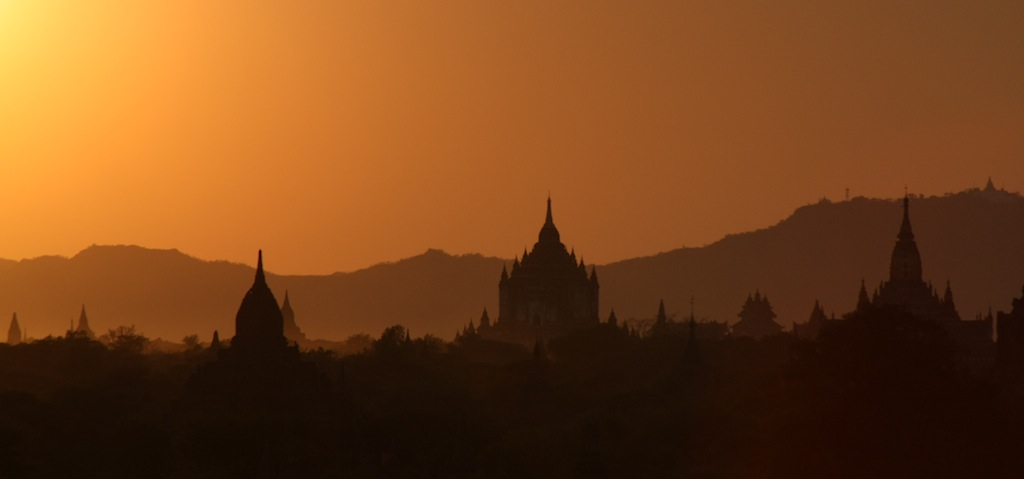
Bagan's prosperous economy built over 10,000 temples between the 11th and 13th centuries.

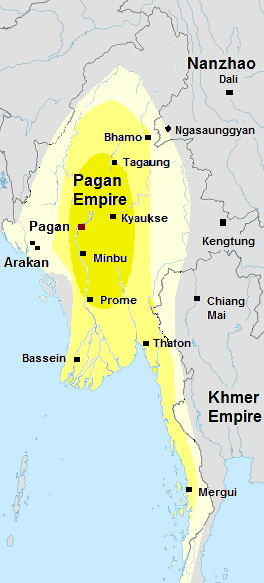
Pagan Empire c. 1210

According to the Burmese chronicles, Bagan was founded in the second century CE, and fortified in 849 by King Pyinbya, 34th successor of the founder of early Bagan. Western scholarship however holds that Bagan was founded in the mid-to-late 9th century by the Mranma (Burmans), who had recently entered the Irrawaddy valley from the Nanzhao Kingdom. It was among several competing Pyu city-states until the late 10th century when the Burman settlement grew in authority and grandeur.

From 1044 to 1287, Bagan was the capital as well as the political, economic and cultural nerve center of the Bagan Empire. Over the course of 250 years, Bagan's rulers and their wealthy subjects constructed over 10,000 religious monuments (approximately 1000 stupas, 10,000 small temples and 3000 monasteries) in an area of 104 km^{2} (40 sq mi) in the Bagan plains. The prosperous city grew in size and grandeur, and became a cosmopolitan center for religious and secular studies, specializing in Pali scholarship in grammar and philosophical-psychological (abhidhamma) studies as well as works in a variety of languages on prosody, phonology, grammar, astrology, alchemy, medicine, and legal studies. The city attracted monks and students from as far as India, Sri Lanka and the Khmer Empire.

The culture of Bagan was dominated by religion. The religion of Bagan was fluid, syncretic and by later standards, unorthodox. It was largely a continuation of religious trends in the Pyu era where Theravada Buddhism co-existed with Mahayana Buddhism, Tantric Buddhism, various Hindu (Saivite, and Vaishana) schools as well as native animist (nat) traditions. While the royal patronage of Theravada Buddhism since the mid-11th century had enabled the Buddhist school to gradually gain primacy, other traditions continued to thrive throughout the Pagan period to degrees later unseen.

Bagan's basic physical layout had already taken shape by the late 11th century, which was the first major period of monument building. A main strip extending for about 9 km along the east bank of the Irrawaddy emerged during this period, with the walled core (known as "Old Bagan") in the middle. 11th-century construction took place throughout this whole area and appears to have been relatively decentralized. The spread of monuments north and south of Old Bagan, according to Hudson, Nyein Lwin, and Win Maung, may reflect construction at the village level, which may have been encouraged by the main elite at Old Bagan.

The peak of monument building took place between about 1150 and 1200. Most of Bagan's largest buildings were built during this period. The overall amount of building material used also peaked during this phase. Construction clustered around Old Bagan, but also took place up and down the main strip, and there was also some expansion to the east, away from the Irrawaddy.

By the 13th century, the area around Old Bagan was already densely packed with monuments, and new major clusters began to emerge to the east. These new clusters, like the monastic area of Minnanthu, were roughly equally distant – and equally accessible – from any part of the original strip that had been defined in the 11th century. Construction during the 13th century featured a significant increase in the building of monasteries and associated smaller monuments. Michael Aung-Thwin has suggested that the smaller sizes may indicate "dwindling economic resources" and that the clustering around monasteries may reflect growing monastic influence. Bob Hudson, Nyein Lwin, and Win Maung also suggest that there was a broadening of donor activity during this period: "the religious merit that accrued from endowing an individual merit was more widely accessible", and more private individuals were endowing small monuments. As with before, this may have taken place at the village level.

Both Bagan itself and the surrounding countryside offered plenty of opportunities for employment in various sectors. The prolific temple building alone would have been a huge stimulus for professions involved in their construction, such as brickmaking and masonry; gold, silver, and bronze working; carpentry and woodcarving; and ceramics. Finished temples would still need maintenance work done, so they continued to boost demand for both artisans' services and unskilled labor well after their construction. Accountants, bankers, and scribes were also necessary to manage the temple properties. These workers, especially the artisans, were paid well, which attracted many people to move to Bagan. Contemporary inscriptions indicate that "people of many linguistic and cultural backgrounds lived and worked" in Bagan during this time period.

Bagan's ascendancy also coincided with a period of political and economic decline in several other nearby regions, like Dvaravati, Srivijaya, and the Chola Empire. As a result, immigrants from those places likely also ended up moving to Bagan, in addition to people moving there from within Myanmar.

The Pagan Empire collapsed in 1287 due to repeated Mongol invasions (1277–1301). Recent research shows that Mongol armies may not have reached Bagan itself, and that even if they did, the damage they inflicted was probably minimal. According to Michael Aung-Thwin, a more likely explanation is that the provincial governors tasked with defending against Mongol incursions were so successful that they became "the new power elite", and their capitals became the new political centers while Bagan itself became a backwater. In any case, something during this period caused Bagan to decline. The city, once home to some 50,000 to 200,000 people, had been reduced to a small town, never to regain its preeminence. The city formally ceased to be the capital of Burma in December 1297 when the Myinsaing Kingdom became the new power in Upper Burma.

=== 14th to 19th centuries ===
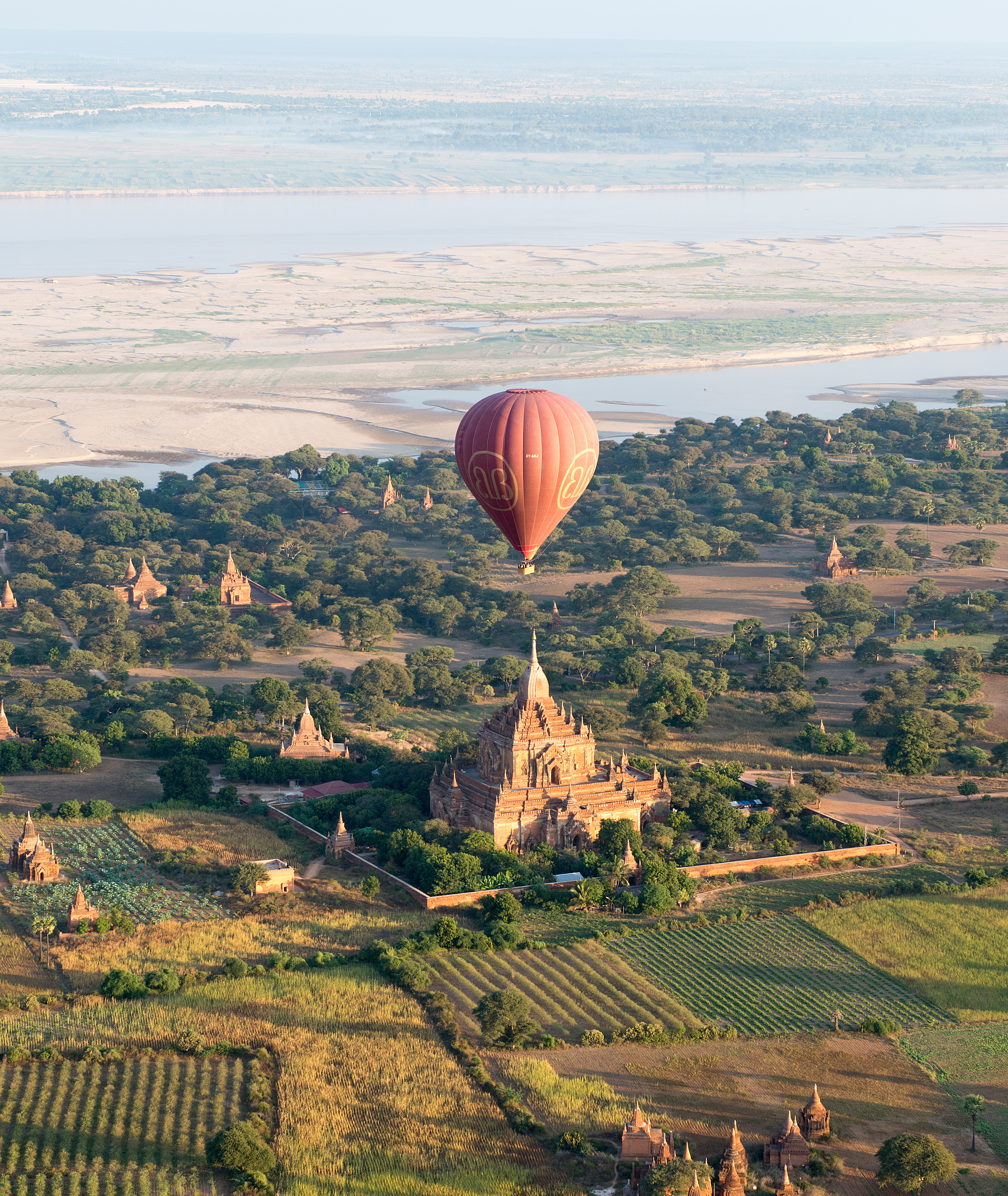
A hot-air balloon flying over a pagoda in Bagan

Bagan survived into the 15th century as a human settlement, and as a pilgrimage destination throughout the imperial period. A smaller number of "new and impressive" religious monuments still went up to the mid-15th century, but afterward, new temple constructions slowed to a trickle, with fewer than 200 temples built between the 15th and 20th centuries. The old capital remained a pilgrimage destination, but pilgrimage was focused only on "a score or so" most prominent temples out of the thousands, such as the Ananda, the Shwezigon, the Sulamani, the Htilominlo, the Dhammayazika, and a few other temples along an ancient road. The rest—thousands of less famous, out-of-the-way temples—fell into disrepair, and most did not survive the test of time.

For the few dozen temples that were regularly patronized, the continued patronage meant regular upkeep as well as architectural additions donated by the devotees. Many temples were repainted with new frescoes on top of their original Pagan era ones, or fitted with new Buddha statues. Then came a series of state-sponsored "systematic" renovations in the Konbaung period (1752–1885), which by and large were not true to the original designs—some finished with "a rude plastered surface, scratched without taste, art or result". The interiors of some temples were also whitewashed, such as the Thatbyinnyu and the Ananda. Many painted inscriptions and even murals were added in this period.

=== 20th century to present ===
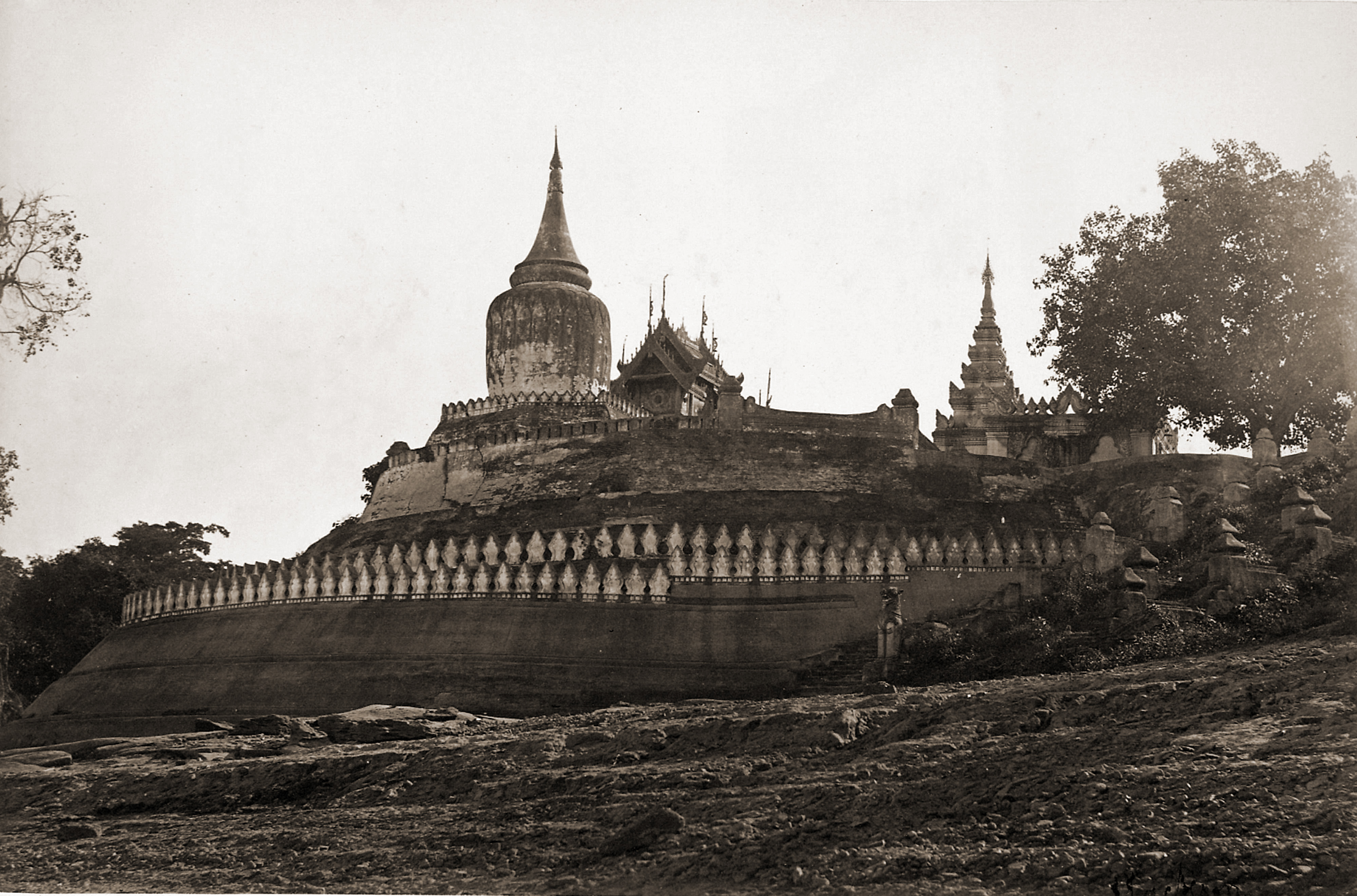
The original Bupaya seen here in 1868 was completely destroyed by the 1975 earthquake. A new gilded pagoda in the original shape has been rebuilt.

Bagan, located in an active earthquake zone, had suffered from many earthquakes over the ages, with over 400 recorded earthquakes between 1904 and 1975. A major earthquake occurred on 8 July 1975, reaching 8 MM in Bagan and Myinkaba, and 7 MM in Nyaung-U. The quake damaged many temples, in many cases, such as the Bupaya, severely and irreparably. Today, 2229 temples and pagodas remain.

Many of these damaged pagodas underwent restorations in the 1990s by the military government, which sought to make Bagan an international tourist destination. However, the restoration efforts instead drew widespread condemnation from art historians and preservationists worldwide. Critics were aghast that the restorations paid little attention to original architectural styles, and used modern materials, and that the government has also established a golf course, a paved highway, and built a 61 m (200 ft) watchtower. Although the government believed that the ancient capital's hundreds of (unrestored) temples and large corpus of stone inscriptions were more than sufficient to win the designation of UNESCO World Heritage Site, the city was not so designated until 2019, allegedly mainly on account of the restorations.

On 24 August 2016, a major earthquake hit Bagan, and caused major damage to nearly 400 temples. The Sulamani and Myauk Guni temples were severely damaged. The Bagan Archaeological Department began a survey and reconstruction effort with the help of the UNESCO. Visitors were prohibited from entering 33 much-damaged temples.

On 6 July 2019, Bagan was officially inscribed as a World Heritage Site by the UNESCO, 24 years after its first nomination, during the 43rd session of the World Heritage Committee. Bagan became the second World Heritage Site in Myanmar, after the Ancient Cities of Pyu. As part of the criteria for the inscription of Bagan, the government had pledged to relocate existing hotels in the archaeological zone to a dedicated hotel zone by 2020.

Bagan today is a main tourist destination in the country's nascent tourism industry.

In March 2025, Myanmar experienced a major earthquake near Bagan. Major stupas in Bagan, including Htilominlo Pagoda and Shwezigon Pagoda, did not incur structural damage.

Following decades of deterioration caused by earthquakes, climate conditions, and limited conservation resources, international organizations have supported efforts to preserve Bagan's temples and archaeological landscape.

== Geography ==
The Bagan Archaeological Zone, defined as the 13 km × 8 km (8.1 mi × 5.0 mi) area centred around Old Bagan, consisting of Nyaung U in the north and New Bagan in the south, lies in the vast expanse of plains in Upper Burma on the bend of the Irrawaddy river. It is located 290 km (180 mi) south-west of Mandalay and 700 km (430 mi) north of Yangon.

=== Climate ===
Bagan lies in the middle of the Dry Zone, the region roughly between Shwebo in the north and Pyay in the south. Unlike the coastal regions of the country, which receive annual monsoon rainfalls exceeding 2,500 mm (98 in), the dry zone gets little precipitation as it is sheltered from the rain by the Rakhine Yoma mountain range in the west.

Available online climate sources report Bagan climate quite differently.

Climate data for Bagan
Month	Jan	Feb	Mar	Apr	May	Jun	Jul	Aug	Sep	Oct	Nov	Dec	Year
Mean daily maximum °C (°F)	32 (90)	35 (95)	36 (97)	37 (99)	33 (91)	30 (86)	30 (86)	30 (86)	30 (86)	32 (90)	32 (90)	32 (90)	32 (91)
Mean daily minimum °C (°F)	18 (64)	19 (66)	22 (72)	24 (75)	25 (77)	25 (77)	24 (75)	24 (75)	24 (75)	24 (75)	22 (72)	19 (66)	23 (72)
Source: www.holidaycheck.com

Climate data for Bagan
Month	Jan	Feb	Mar	Apr	May	Jun	Jul	Aug	Sep	Oct	Nov	Dec	Year
Mean daily maximum °C (°F)	28 (82)	32 (90)	36 (97)	39 (102)	38 (100)	35 (95)	33 (91)	32 (90)	32 (90)	31 (88)	29 (84)	27 (81)	33 (91)
Mean daily minimum °C (°F)	16 (61)	19 (66)	24 (75)	28 (82)	29 (84)	27 (81)	26 (79)	25 (77)	25 (77)	24 (75)	20 (68)	17 (63)	23 (74)
Average rainfall mm (inches)	5 (0.2)	0.6 (0.02)	2.6 (0.10)	16.4 (0.65)	49.6 (1.95)	69.8 (2.75)	126.7 (4.99)	182 (7.2)	152.4 (6.00)	103.6 (4.08)	25.5 (1.00)	5.7 (0.22)	739.9 (29.16)
Average rainy days	2	1	2	9	14	21	26	28	24	20	6	2	155
Source: www.weatheronline.com

== Cityscape ==
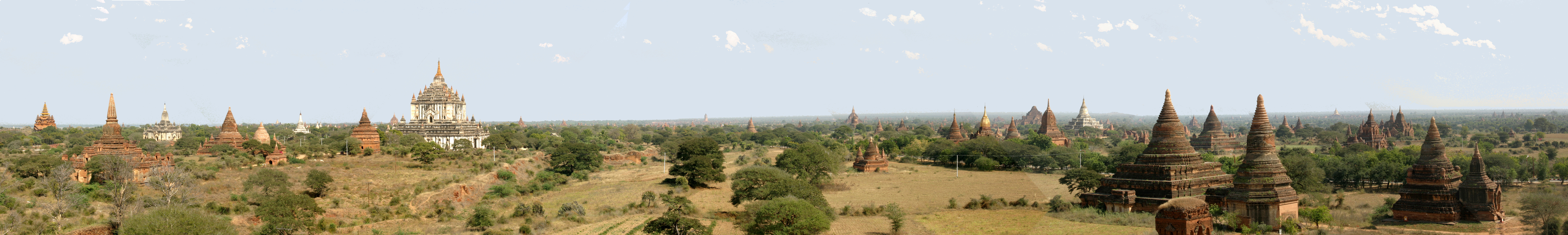
Panorama of Bagan as seen from the Minyeingon Temple: The Thatbyinnyu on the left and the Dhammayangyi in the distance on the right
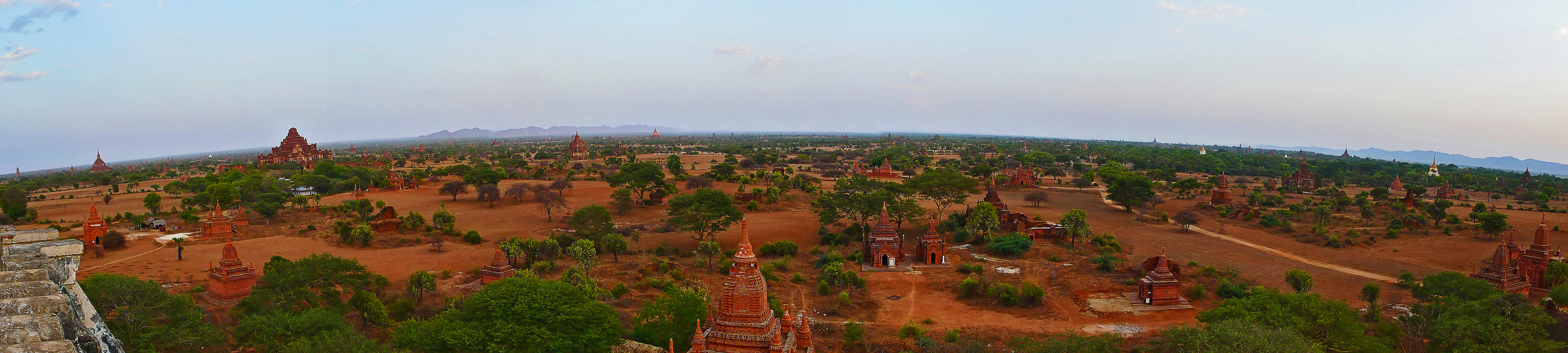
Bagan Plains with the Dhammayangyi on the left
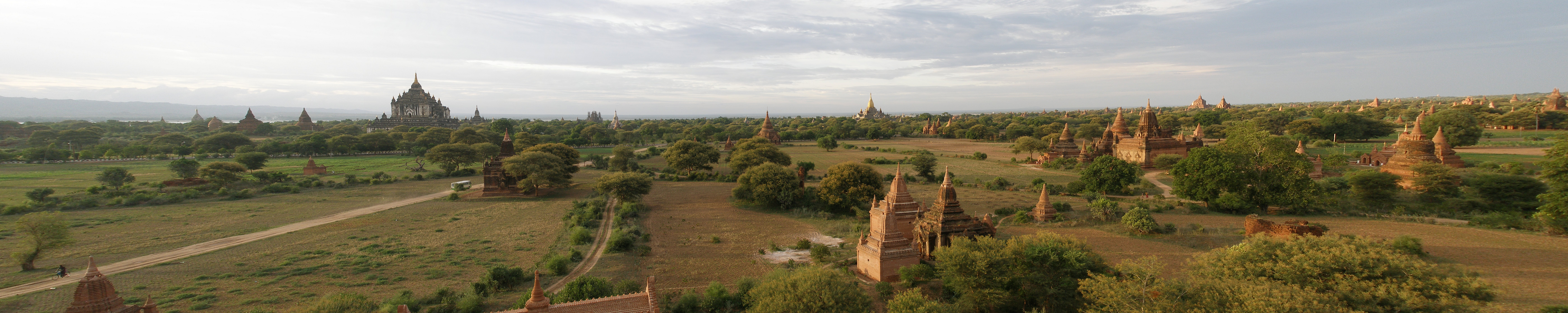
Bagan Plains with the Irrawaddy in the background
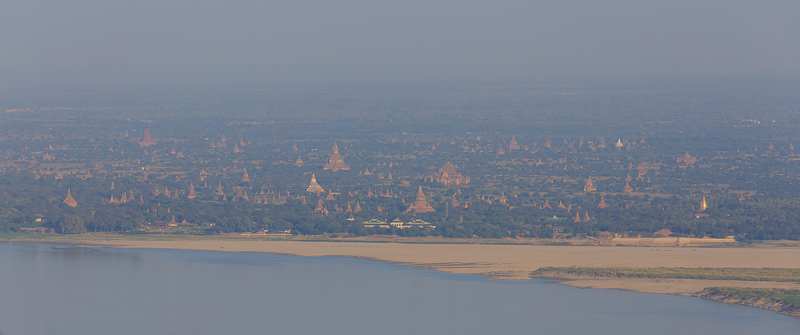
Bagan Plains, as seen from across the Irrawaddy river.

=== Architecture ===
Bagan stands out for not only the sheer number of religious edifices of Myanmar but also the magnificent architecture of the buildings, and their contribution to Burmese temple design. The artistry of the architecture of pagodas in Bagan proves the achievement of Myanmar craftsmen in handicrafts. The Bagan temple falls into one of two broad categories: the stupa-style solid temple and the gu-style (ဂူ) hollow temple.

==== Stupas ====
A stupa, also called a pagoda or chedi, is a massive structure, typically with a relic chamber inside. The Bagan stupas or pagodas evolved from earlier Pyu designs, which in turn were based on the stupa designs of the Andhra region, particularly Amaravati and Nagarjunakonda in present-day south-eastern India, and to a smaller extent to Ceylon. The Bagan-era stupas in turn were the prototypes for later Burmese stupas in terms of symbolism, form and design, building techniques and even materials.

Evolution of the Burmese stupa

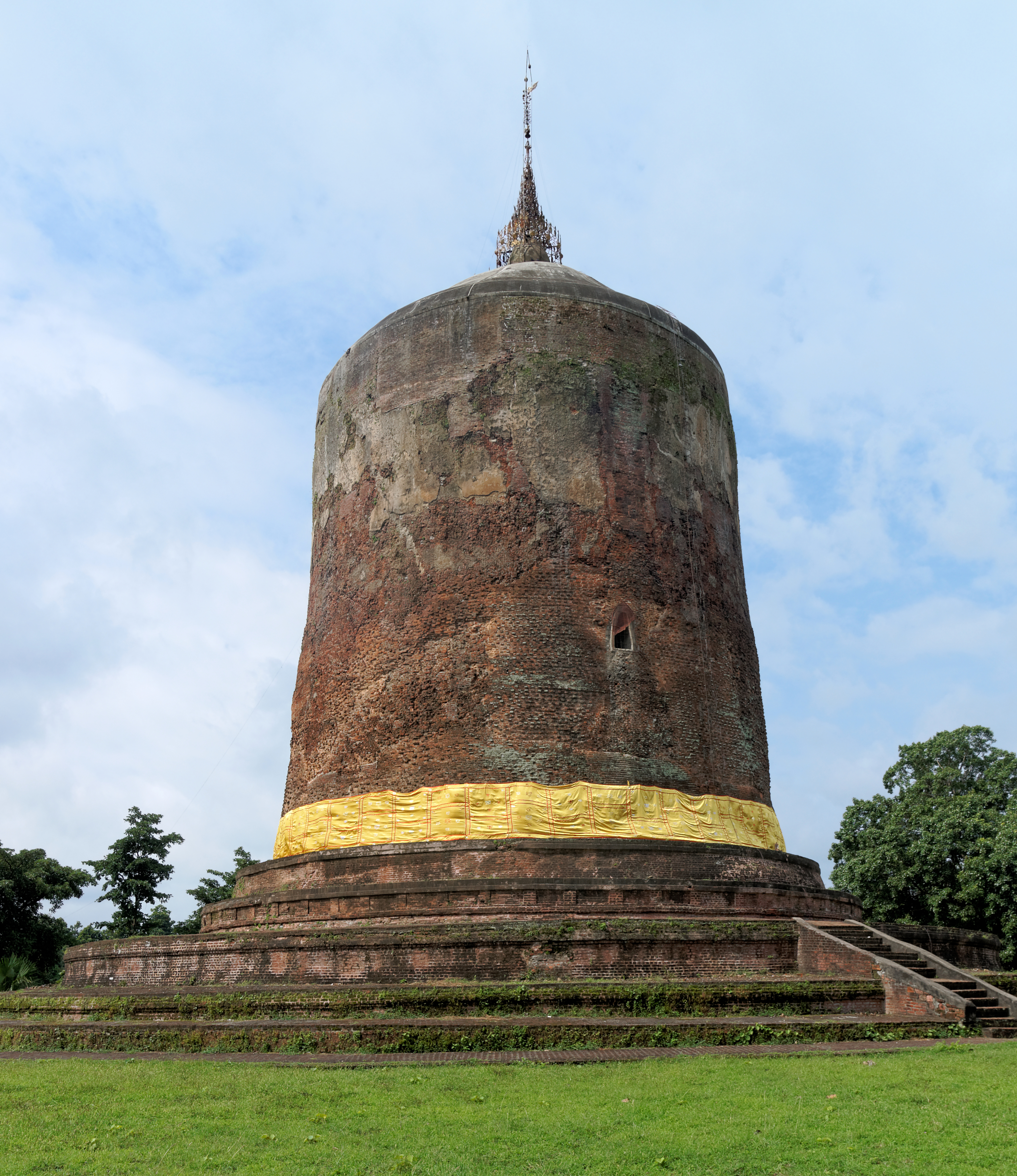
Bawbawgyi Pagoda (7th century Sri Ksetra)

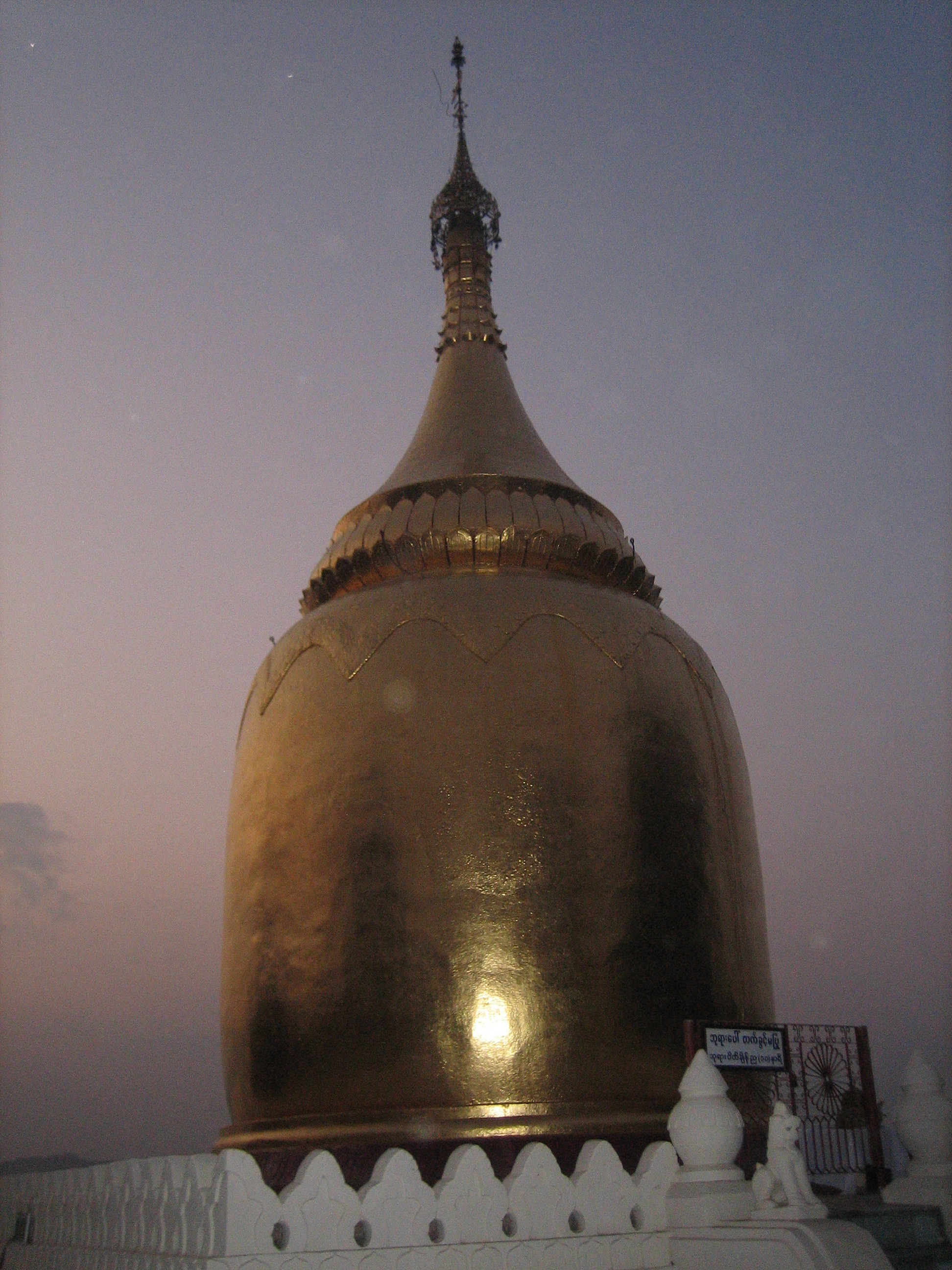
Bupaya (pre-11th century)

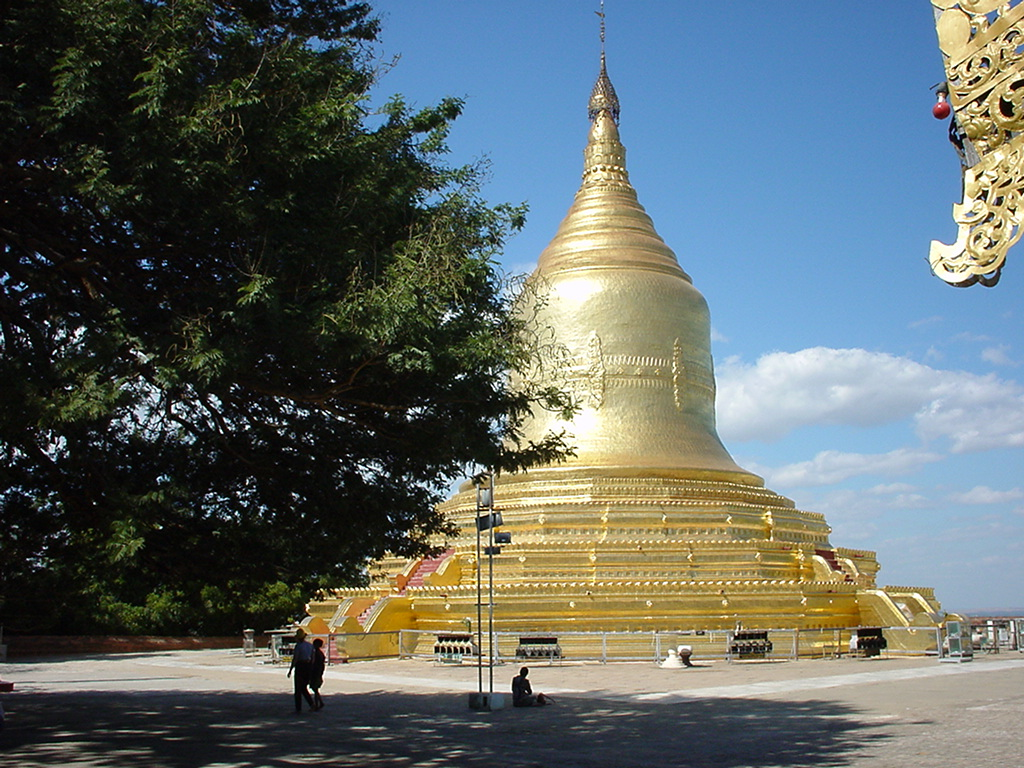
The Lawkananda (pre-11th century)

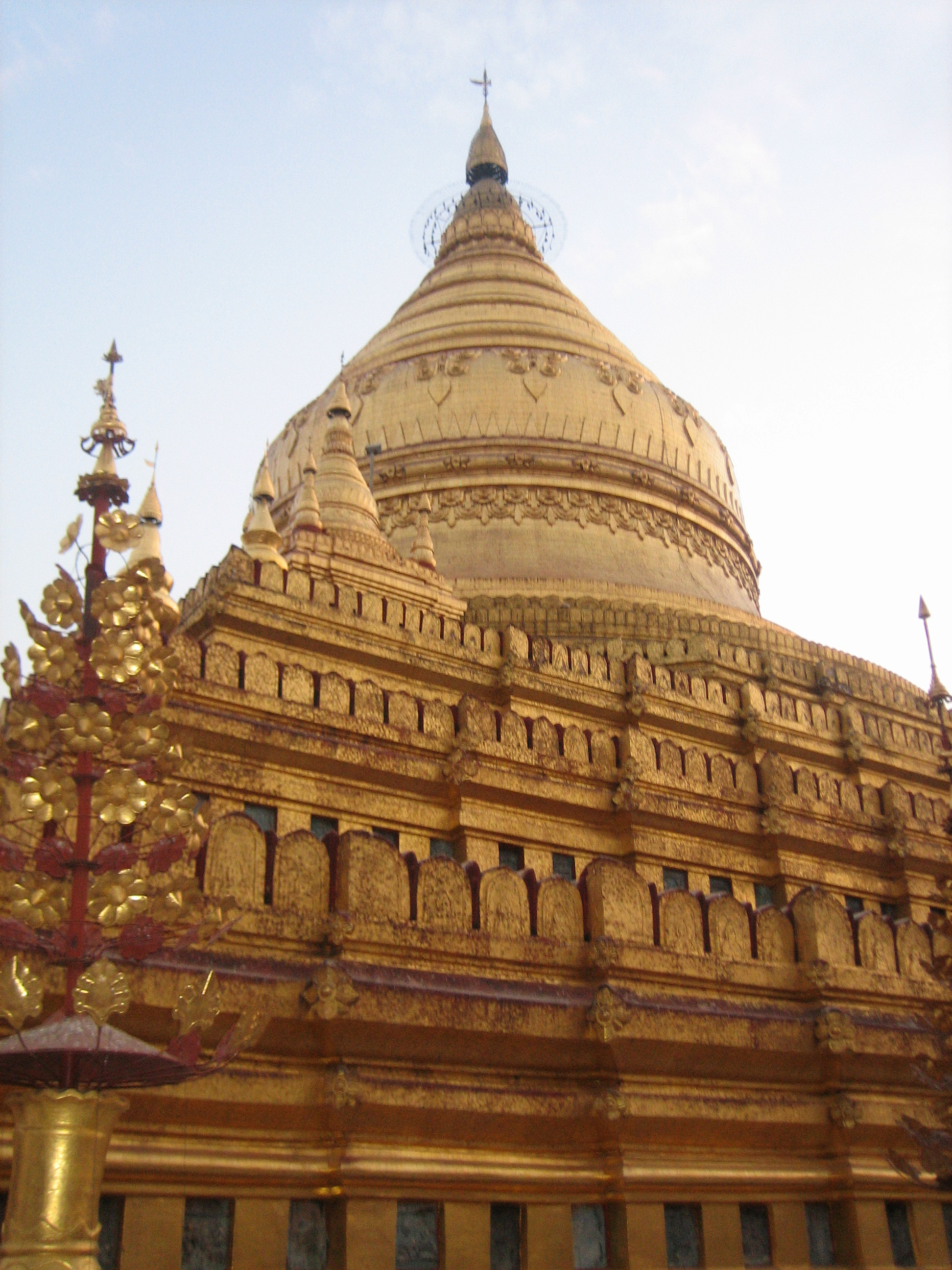
The Shwezigon (11th century)

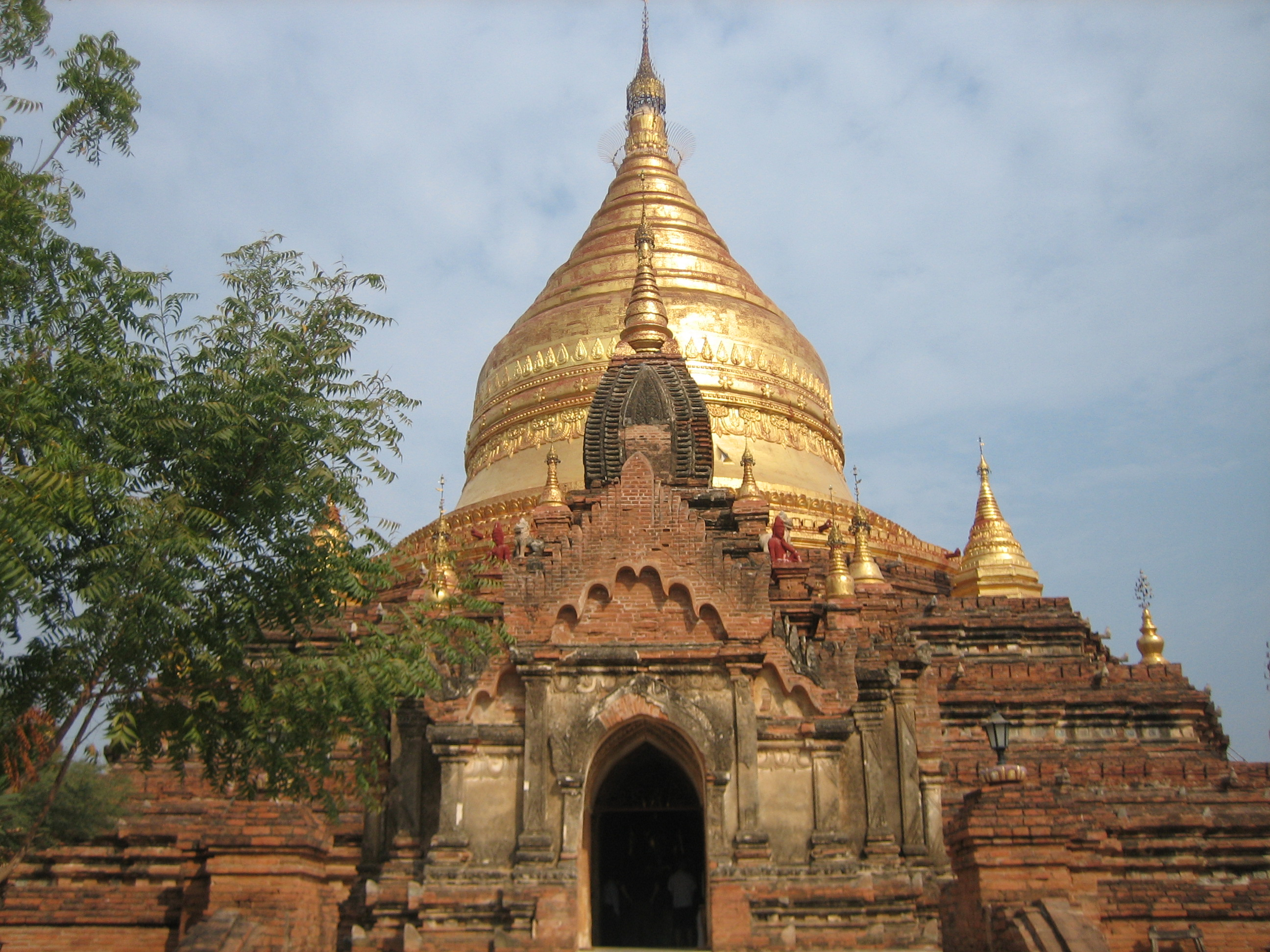
The Dhammayazika (12th century)

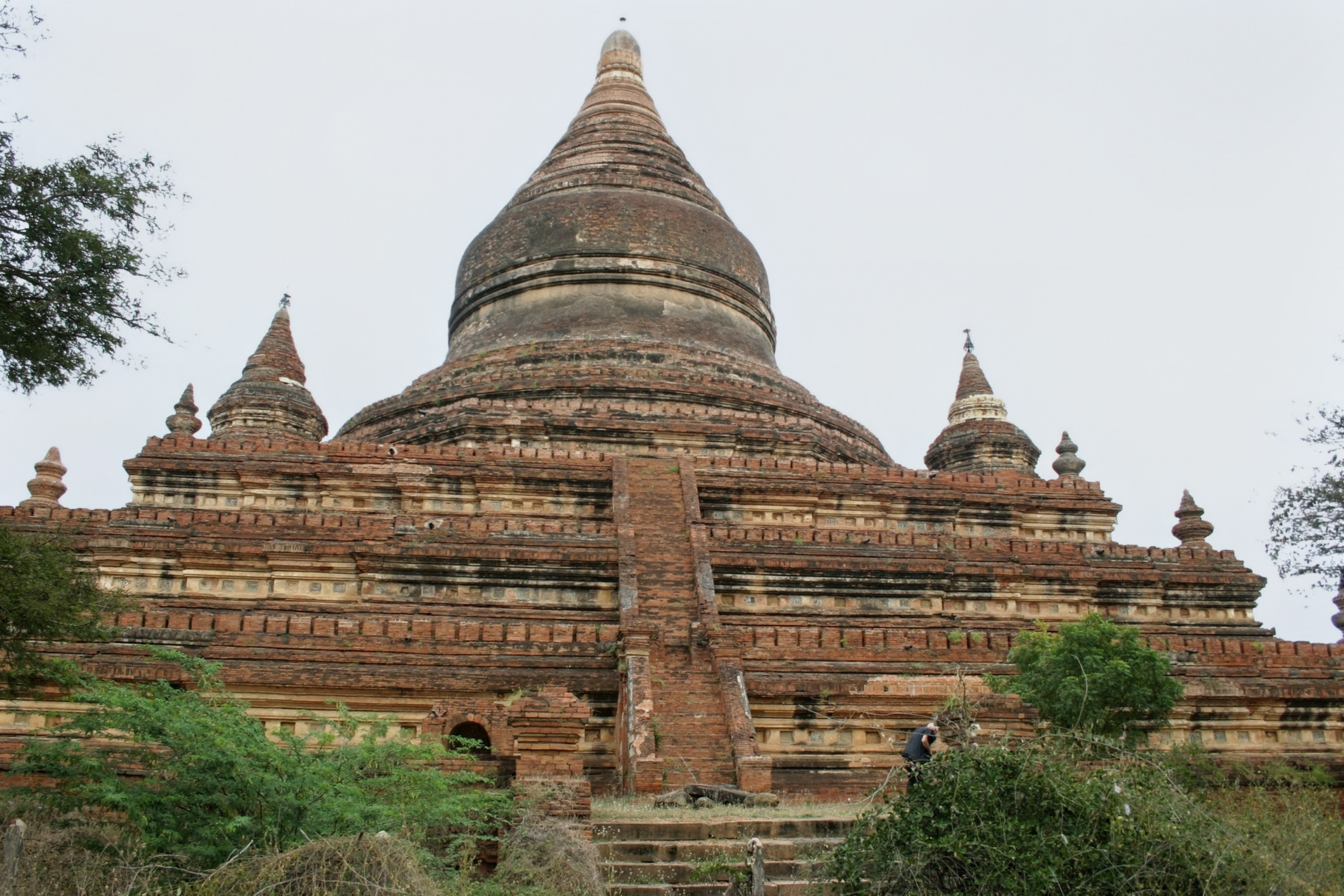
The Mingalazedi (13th century)

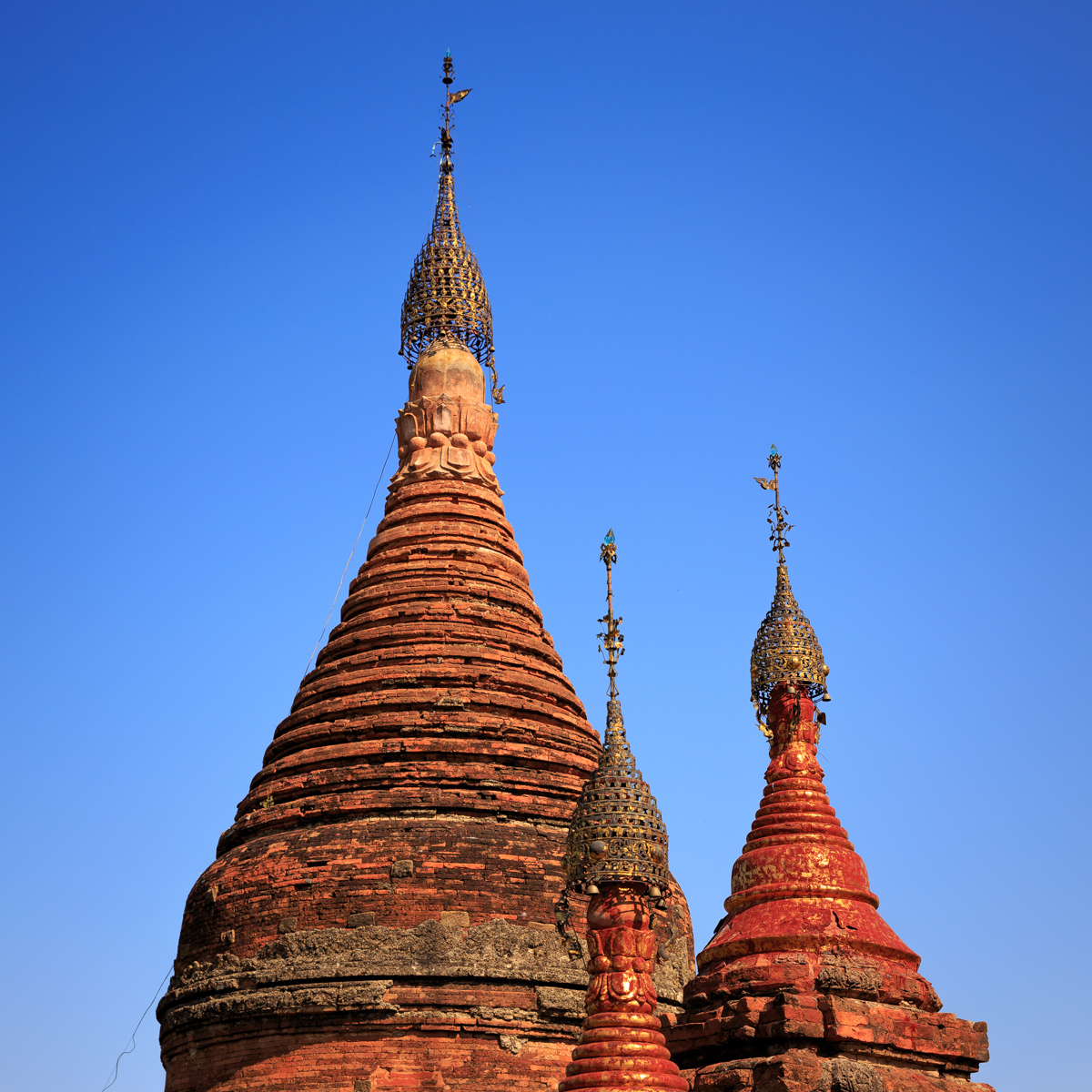
Ceremonial umbrellas at a Bagan temple

Originally, a Ceylonese stupa had a hemispheric body (Pali: anda "the egg"), on which a rectangular box surrounded by a stone balustrade (harmika) was set. Extending up from the top of the stupa was a shaft supporting several ceremonial umbrellas. The stupa Buddhist cosmos: its shape symbolizes Mount Meru while the umbrella mounted on the brickwork represents the world's axis. The brickwork pediment was often covered in stucco and decorated in relief. Pairs or series of ogres as guardian figures ('bilu') were a favourite theme in the Bagan period.

The original Indic design was gradually modified first by the Pyu, and then by Burmans at Bagan where the stupa gradually developed a longer, cylindrical form. The earliest Bagan stupas such as the Bupaya (c. 9th century) were the direct descendants of the Pyu style at Sri Ksetra. By the 11th century, the stupa had developed into a more bell-shaped form in which the parasols morphed into a series of increasingly smaller rings placed on top of one another, rising to a point. On top of the rings, the new design replaced the harmika with a lotus bud. The lotus bud design then evolved into the "banana bud", which forms the extended apex of most Burmese pagodas. Three or four rectangular terraces served as the base for a pagoda, often with a gallery of terra-cotta tiles depicting Buddhist jataka stories. The Shwezigon Pagoda and the Shwesandaw Pagoda are the earliest examples of this type. Examples of the trend toward a more bell-shaped design gradually gained primacy as seen in the Dhammayazika Pagoda (late 12th century) and the Mingalazedi Pagoda (late 13th century).

==== Hollow temples ====
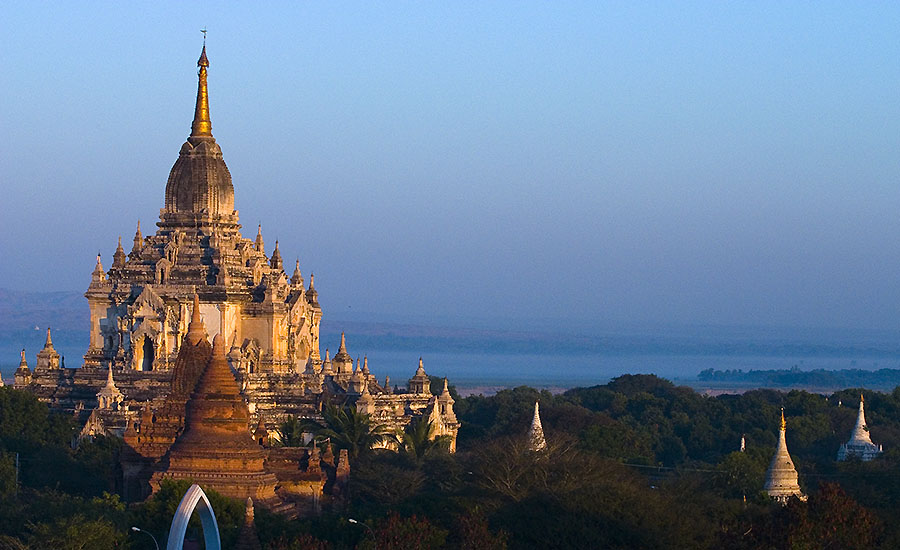
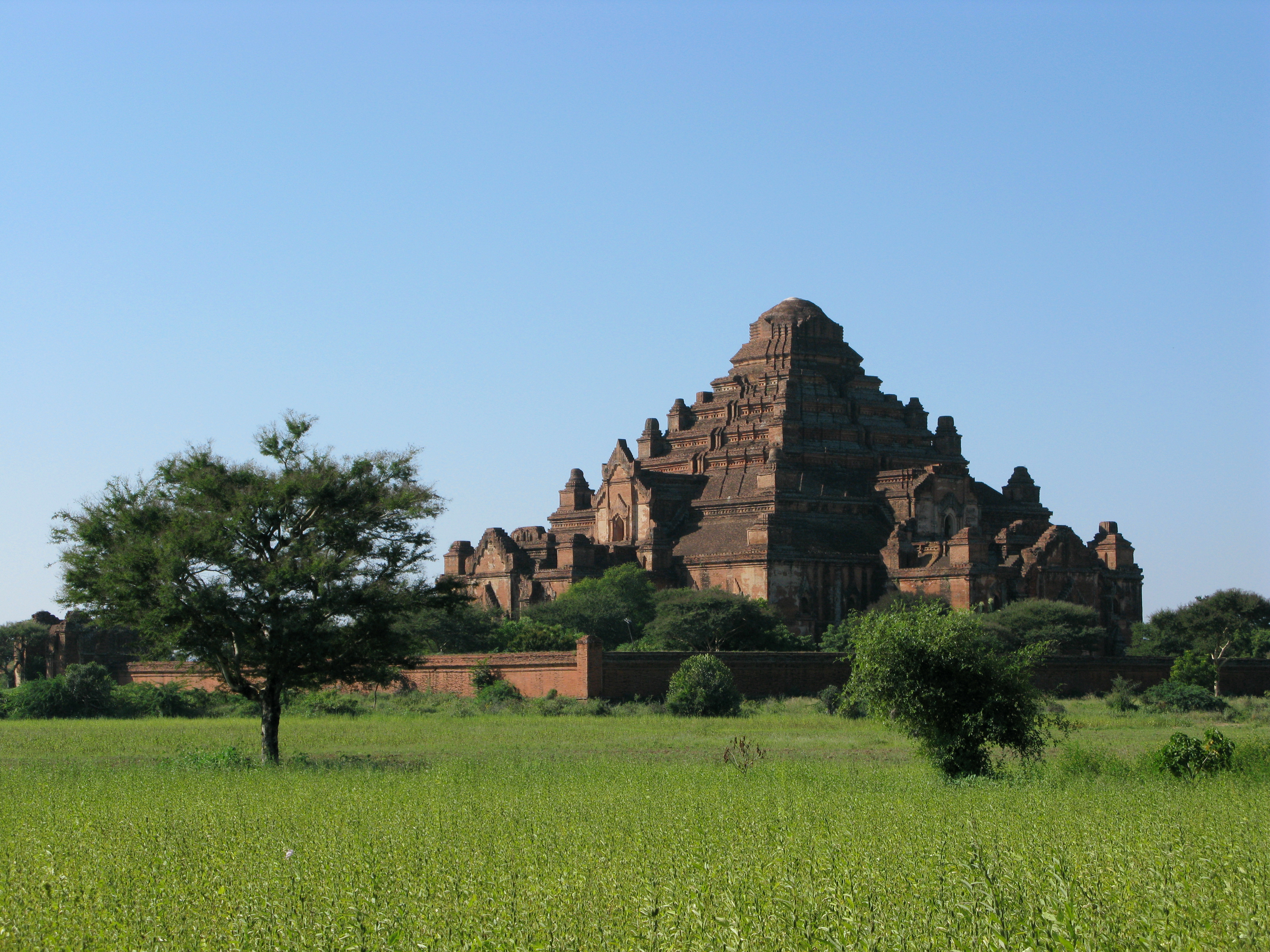
"One-face"-style Gawdawpalin Temple (left) and "four-face" Dhammayangyi Temple

In contrast to the stupas, the hollow gu-style temple is a structure used for meditation, devotional worship of the Buddha and other Buddhist rituals. The gu temples come in two basic styles: "one-face" design and "four-face" design—essentially one main entrance and four main entrances. Other styles, such as five-face and hybrids, also exist. The one-face style grew out of the 2nd century Beikthano, and the four-face out of the 7th century Sri Ksetra. The temples, whose main features were the pointed arches and the vaulted chamber, became larger and grander in the Bagan period.

==== Innovations ====
Although the Burmese temple designs evolved from Indic, Pyu (and possibly Mon) styles, the techniques of vaulting seem to have developed in Bagan itself. The earliest vaulted temples in Bagan date to the 11th century, while the vaulting did not become widespread in India until the late 12th century. The masonry of the buildings shows "an astonishing degree of perfection", where many of the immense structures survived the 1975 earthquake more or less intact. (Unfortunately, the vaulting techniques of the Bagan era were lost in the later periods. Only much smaller gu style temples were built after Bagan. In the 18th century, for example, King Bodawpaya attempted to build the Mingun Pagoda, in the form of spacious vaulted chambered temple but failed as craftsmen and masons of the later era had lost the knowledge of vaulting and keystone arching to reproduce the spacious interior space of the Bagan hollow temples.)

Another architectural innovation originated in Bagan is the Buddhist temple with a pentagonal floor plan. This design grew out of hybrid (between one-face and four-face designs) designs. The idea was to include the veneration of the Maitreya Buddha, the future and fifth Buddha of this era, in addition to the four who had already appeared. The Dhammayazika and the Ngamyethna Pagoda are examples of the pentagonal design.

=== Notable cultural sites ===
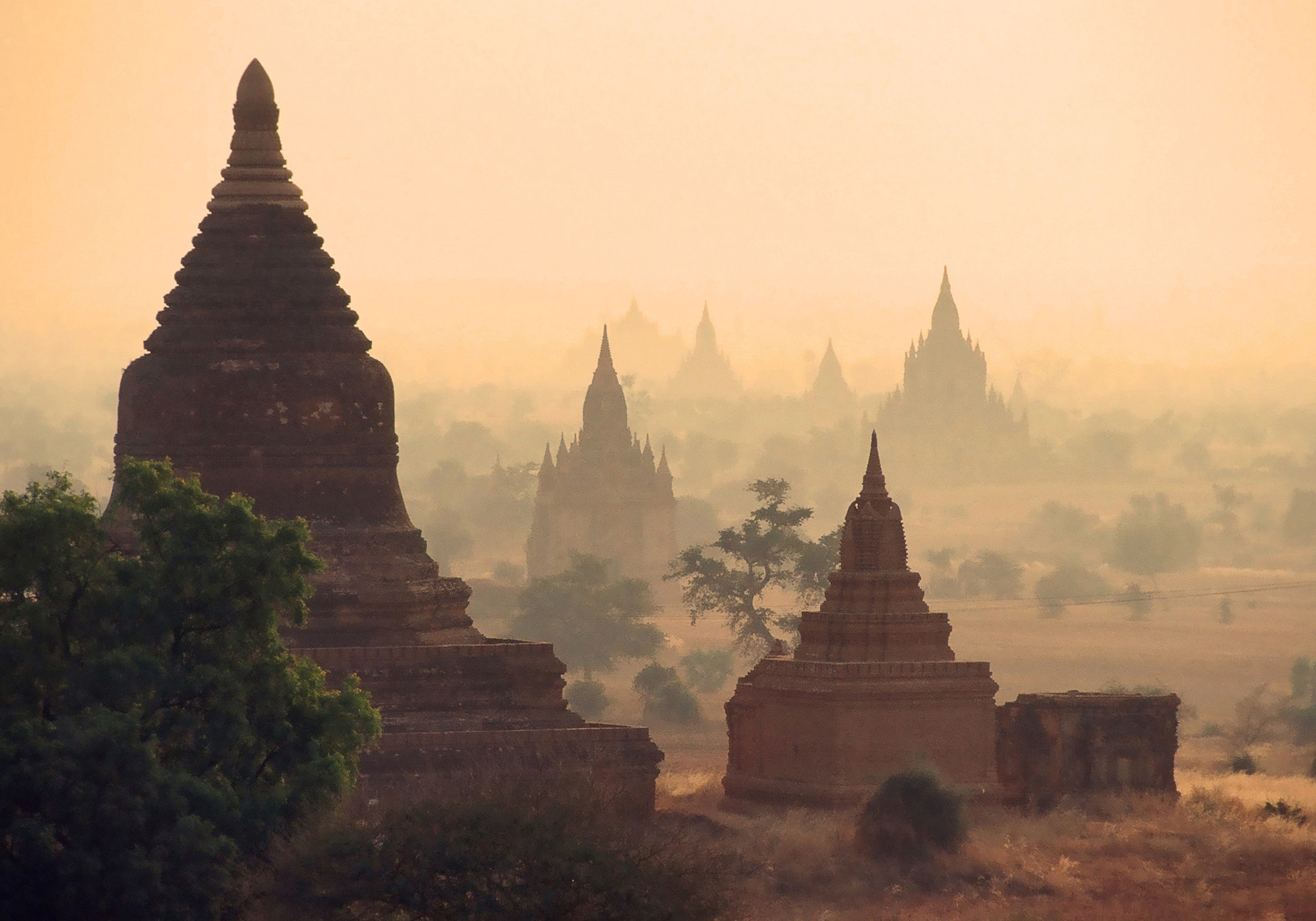
Bagan at dawn

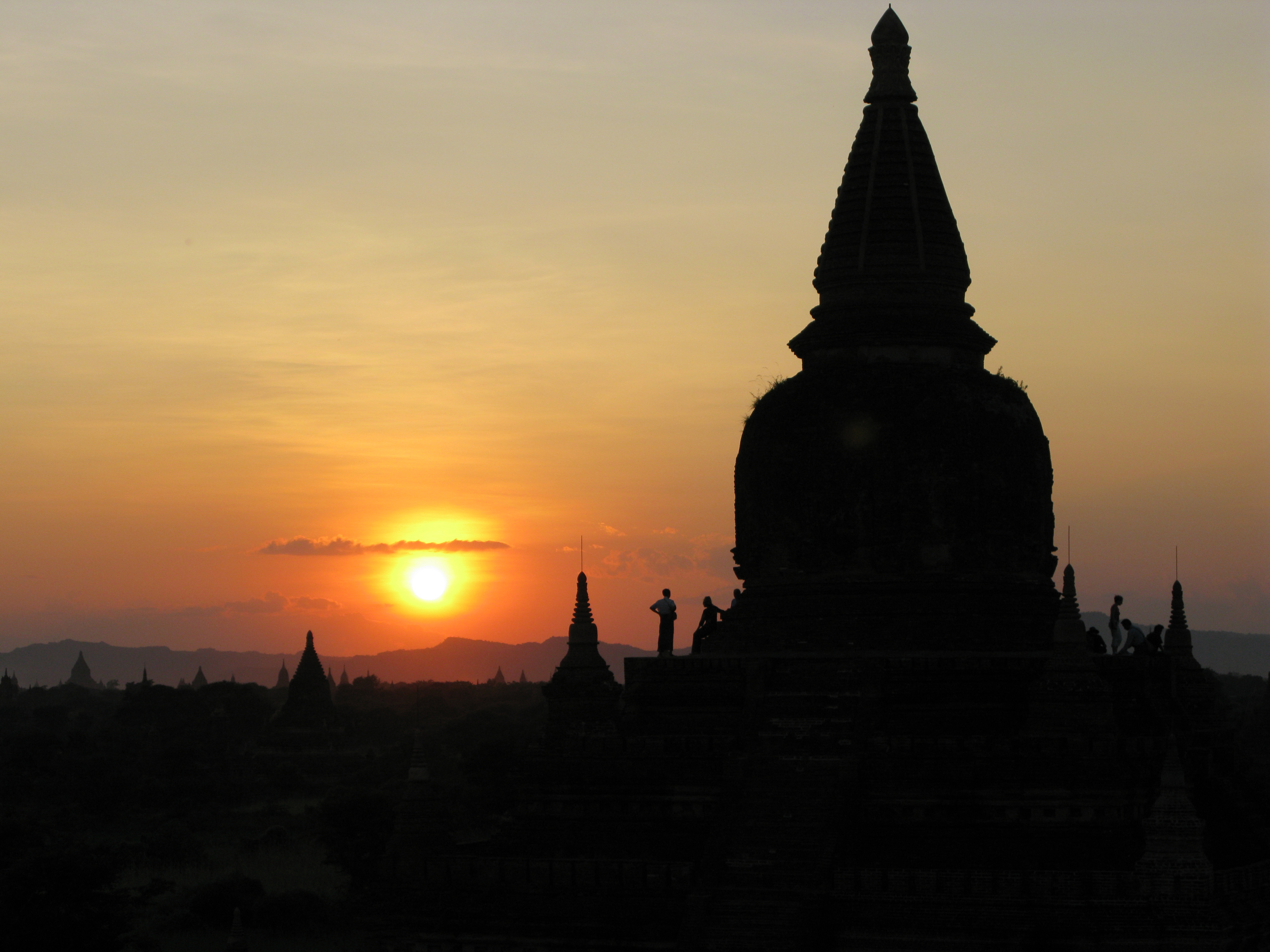
Old Bagan at sunset

Name	Picture	Built	Sponsor(s)	Notes
Ananda Temple		1105	King Kyansittha	One of the most famous temples in Bagan; 51 m (167 ft) tall
Bupaya Pagoda		c. 850	King Pyu Saw Hti	In Pyu style; original 9th century pagoda destroyed by the 1975 earthquake; completely rebuilt, now gilded
Dhammayangyi Temple		1167–1170	King Narathu	Largest of all temples in Bagan
Dhammayazika Pagoda		1196–1198	King Sithu II	
Gawdawpalin Temple		c. 1211–1235	King Sithu II and King Htilominlo	
Gubyaukgyi Temple (Wetkyi-in)		Early 13th Century	King Kyansittha	
Gubyaukgyi Temple (Myinkaba)		1113	Prince Yazakumar	
Htilominlo Temple		1218	King Htilominlo	46 m (151 ft), 3-story temple
Lawkananda Pagoda		c. 1044–1077	King Anawrahta	
Mahabodhi Temple		c. 1218	King Htilominlo	Smaller replica of the Mahabodhi Temple in Bodh Gaya
Manuha Temple		1067	King Manuha	
Mingalazedi Pagoda		1268–1274	King Narathihapate	
Minyeingon Temple				
Myazedi inscription		1112	Prince Yazakumar	"Rosetta Stone of Burma" with inscriptions in four languages: Pyu, Old Mon, Old Burmese and Pali
Nanpaya Temple		c. 1160–1170		Hindu temple in Mon style; believed to be either Manuha's old residence or built on the site
Nathlaung Kyaung Temple		c. 1044–1077		Hindu temple
Payathonzu Temple		c. 1200		in Mahayana and Tantric-styles
Seinnyet Nyima Pagoda and Seinnyet Ama Pagoda		11th century		
Shwegugyi Temple		1131	King Sithu I	Sithu I was assassinated here; known for its arched windows
Shwesandaw Pagoda		c. 1057	King Anawrahta	100 m (328 ft) tall without counting the hti spire; Tallest Pagoda in Bagan
Shwezigon Pagoda		1102	King Anawrahta and King Kyansittha	
Sulamani Temple		1183	King Sithu II	
Tharabha Gate		c. 1020	King Kunhsaw Kyaunghpyu and King Kyiso	The only remaining part of the old walls; radiocarbon dated to c. 1020
Thatbyinnyu Temple		1150/51	Sithu I	66 m (217 ft); Tallest temple in Bagan
Tuywindaung Pagoda			Anawrahta	

== The walled core of "Old Bagan" ==
The 140-hectare core on the riverbank is surrounded by three walls. A fourth wall, on the western side, may have once existed before being washed away by the river at some point. The Irrawaddy has certainly eroded at least some parts of the city, since there are "buildings collapsing into the river both upstream and downstream from the walled core".

The walled core called "Old Bagan" takes up only a tiny fraction of the 8,000-hectare area where monuments are found. It is also much smaller than the walled areas of major Pyu cities (the largest, Śrī Kṣetra or Thayekittaya, has a walled area of 1,400 hectares). Altogether, this suggests that "'Old Bagan' represents an elite core, not an urban boundary".

== Outlying sites ==
=== Otein Taung ===
An important outlying site is at Otein Taung, 2 km south of the Ananda temple in the walled city of Old Bagan. The name "Otein Taung" is a descriptive name meaning "pottery hill"; there is another Otein Taung on the north side of Beikthano. The site of Otein Taung at Bagan actually consists of two different mounds separated by 500 meters. Both are "covered with dense layers of fragmented pottery, and with scatters of potsherds visible around and between them". Local farm fields for crops like maize come right up to the edges of the mounds, and goats and cattle commonly graze on them.

Besides the mounds, there are also about 40 small monuments at Otein Taung, mostly dated to the 13th century. Several of these are clustered around a monastery on the south side of the western mound. There is also a group of monuments arranged in a straight line, which may represent a property boundary or road. Another cluster exists south of the eastern mound, and then there are also randomly scattered monuments in the area between the mounds. Finally, there is a large temple between the two mounds, which was probably built in the 12th century. This temple was restored in 1999.

Otein Taung was excavated by a team led by Bob Hudson and Nyein Lwin in 1999 and 2000. Excavation revealed layers of potash with a fine texture, suggesting that most of the fuel was provided by bamboo and other grasses. Also found were small charcoal fragments, preserved burnt bamboo filaments, and some animal bones and pigs' teeth. Based on radiocarbon dating, Otein Taung dates from at least the 9th century, which is well before recorded history at Bagan.

The sprinkler pot, or kendi, is a very characteristic type of pottery from medieval Myanmar, and over 50 spouts and necks belonging to them were found by archaeologists at Otein Taung. These were all straight, in contrast to the bent spouts found at Beikthano. Also found at Otein Taung are earthenware tubes, about 60 cm long and 40 cm in diameter. Similar pipes have been found at Old Bagan, and they are thought to have been part of toilets.

It is not clear whether Otein Taung represents a large-scale pottery production site or "a huge, and for Bagan unique, residential midden". Archaeologists did not find any "slumps characteristic of overfiring in a stoneware kiln, [or] any large brick or earth structures suggesting a pottery kiln", but several "earthenware anvils" were found at the site, as well as a 10-cm-long clay tube that may have been used as a stamp for decorating pots. The anvils are common potters' tools in South and Southeast Asia: they are held inside a pot while the outside is beaten with a paddle.

If Otein Taung was used as a pottery production site, then it would have had good access to natural clay resources: the Bagan area has clayey subsoil that is "still mined today for brickmaking". There are four tanks within 500 m of Otein Taung that may have originated as clay pits.

=== Museums ===
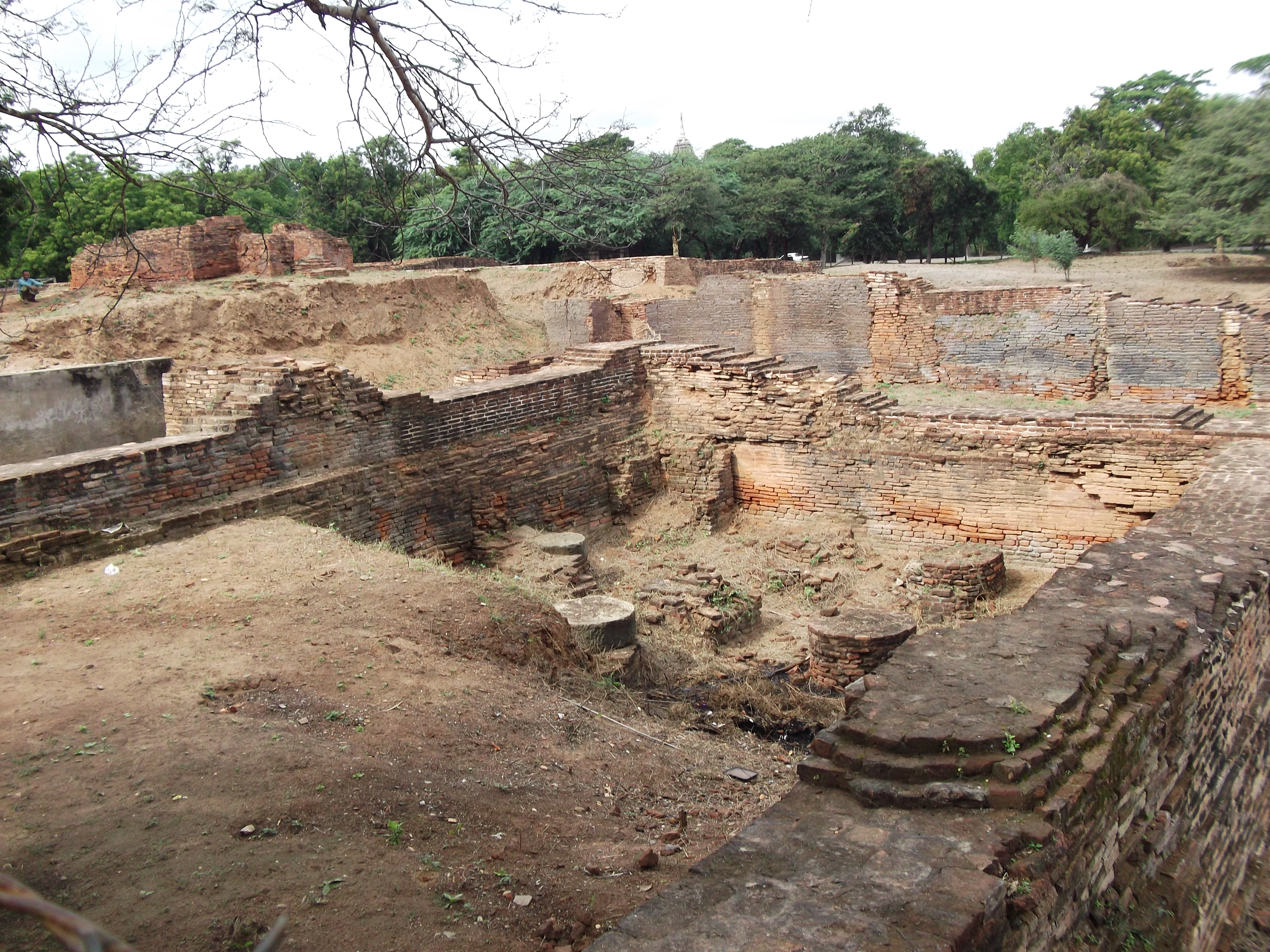
Old palace site in Old Bagan. A new completely conjectural palace has been reconstructed since 2003.

- The Bagan Archaeological Museum: The only museum in the Bagan Archaeological Zone. The three-story museum houses a number of rare Bagan period objects including the original Myazedi inscriptions, the Rosetta Stone of Burma.
- Anawrahta's Palace: It was rebuilt in 2003 based on the extant foundations at the old palace site. But the palace above the foundation is completely conjectural.

== 3D documentation with LiDAR ==
The Zamani Project from the University of Cape Town, South Africa, offered its services towards the spatial documentation of monuments in Bagan in response to the destruction of monuments by an earthquake in August 2016. After reconnaissance visit to Bagan and a subsequent meeting at the UNESCO offices in Bangkok in February 2017, the Zamani Project documented 12 monuments in Bagan using LiDAR, during three field campaigns between 2017 and 2018, including Kubyauk-gyi (Gubyaukgyi) (298); Kyauk-ku-umin (154); Tha-peik-hmauk-gu-hpaya (744); Sula-mani-gu-hpaya (Sulamani) (748) Monument 1053; Sein-nyet-ama (1085); Sein-nyet-nyima (1086); Naga-yon-hpaya (1192); Loka-ok-shaung (1467); Than-daw-kya (1592); Ananda Monastery; and the City Gate of old Bagan (Tharabha Gate).

== Transport ==
Bagan is accessible by air, rail, bus, car and river boat.

=== Air ===
Most international tourists fly to the city. The Nyaung U Airport is the gateway to the Bagan region. Several domestic airlines have regular flights to Yangon, which take about 80 minutes to cover the 600 kilometres. Flights to Mandalay take approximately 30 minutes and to Heho about 40 minutes. The airport is located on the outskirts of Nyaung U and it takes about 20 minutes by taxi to reach Bagan.

=== Rail ===
The city is on a spur from the Yangon–Mandalay Railway. Myanmar Railways operates a daily overnight train service each way between Yangon and Bagan (Train Nos 61 & 62), which takes at least 18 hours. The trains have a sleeper car and also 1st Class and Ordinary Class seating. Between Mandalay and Bagan there are two daily services each way (Train Nos 117,118,119 & 120) that take at least 8 hours. The trains have 1st Class and Ordinary Class seating.

=== Buses and cars ===
Overnight buses and cars also operate to and from Yangon and Mandalay taking approximately 9 and 6 hours respectively.

=== Boat ===
An 'express' ferry service runs between Bagan and Mandalay. Following the Irrawaddy River, the fastest ferry takes around 9 hours to travel the 170 kilometres. The service runs daily during peak periods and slower sailings, with overnight stops also available.

== Economy ==
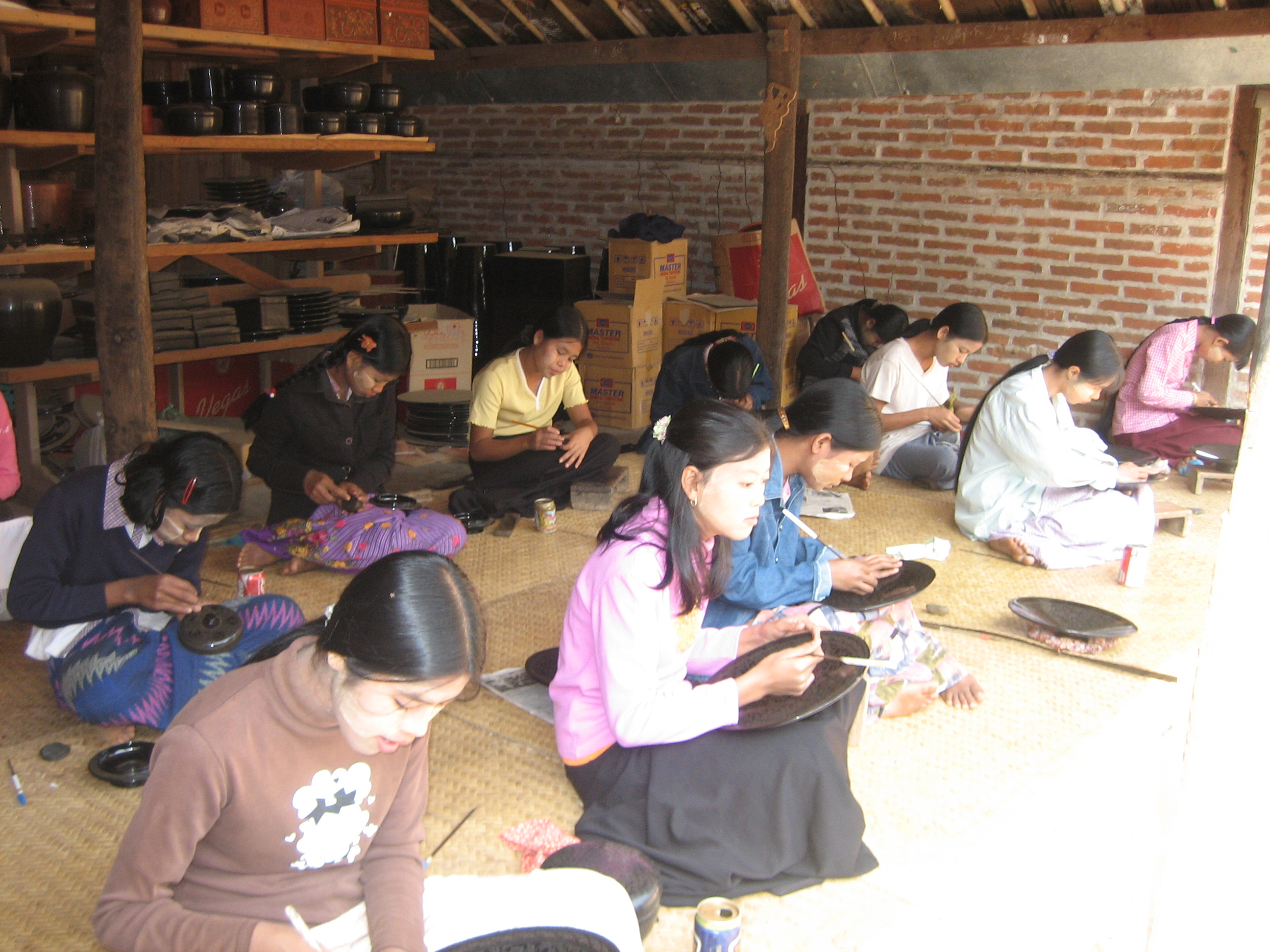
Workers at a lacquerware factory

Bagan's economy is based mainly on tourism. Because of boycotts against the previous military government, the Bagan region's tourism infrastructure is still quite modest by international standards. The city has a few international standard hotels and many family-run guesthouses. Bagan is also the center of Burmese lacquerware industry, which to a large degree depends on tourist demand. Much of the lacquerware is destined for souvenir shops in Yangon, and to the world markets. Moreover, the lacquerware-making process itself has become a tourist draw.

== Demographics ==
The population of Bagan in its heyday is estimated to be anywhere between 50,000 and 200,000 people. Until the advent of tourism industry in the 1990s, only a few villagers lived in Old Bagan. The rise of tourism has attracted a sizable population to the area. Because Old Bagan is now off limits to permanent dwellings, much of the population reside in either New Bagan, south of Old Bagan, or Nyaung-U, north of Old Bagan. The majority of native residents are Bamar.

== Administration ==
The Bagan archaeological zone is part of Nyaung-U District, Mandalay Region.

== Sister cities ==
- Luang Prabang, Laos
- Siem Reap, Cambodia

== Gallery ==
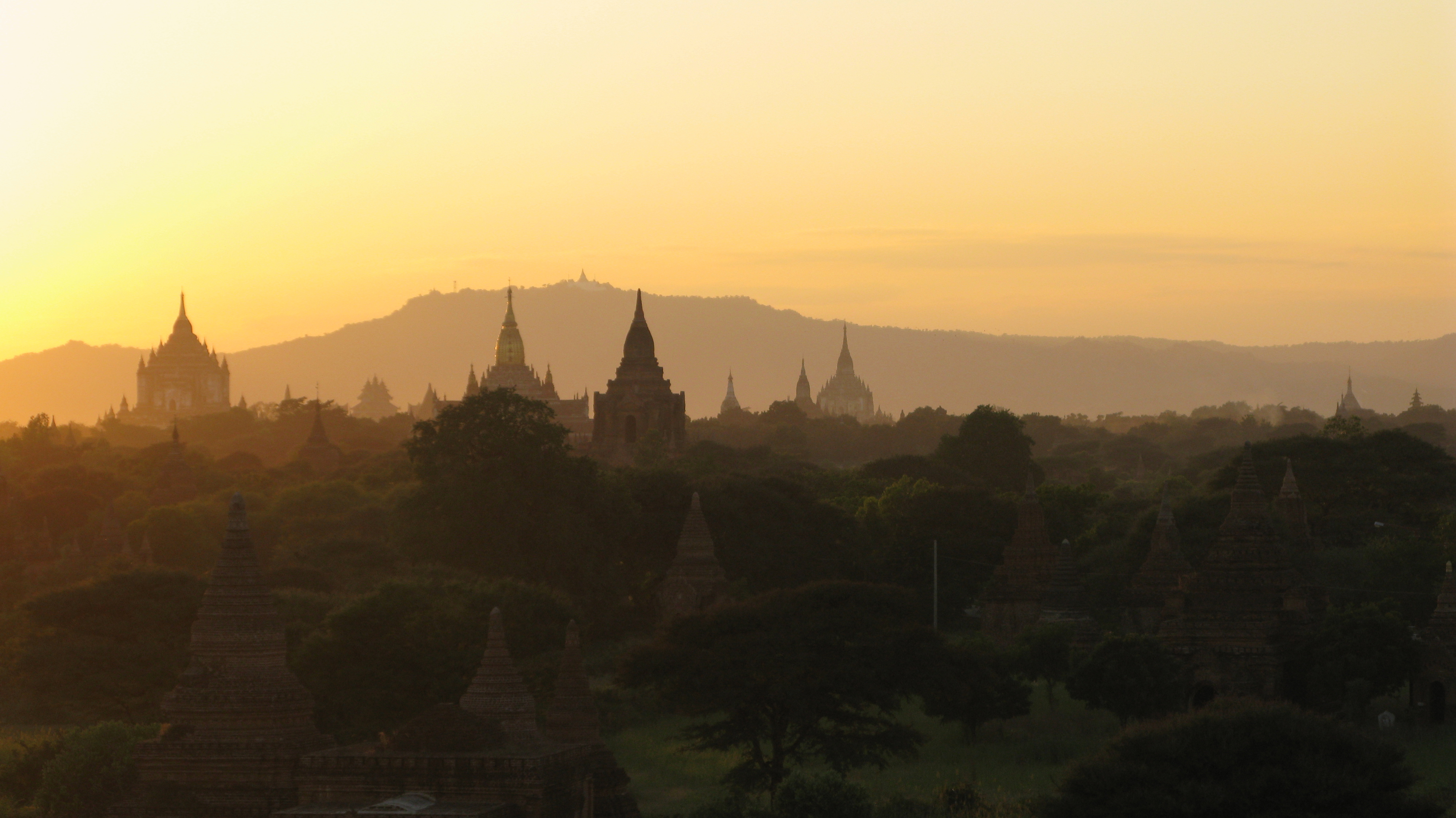
Bagan Plains

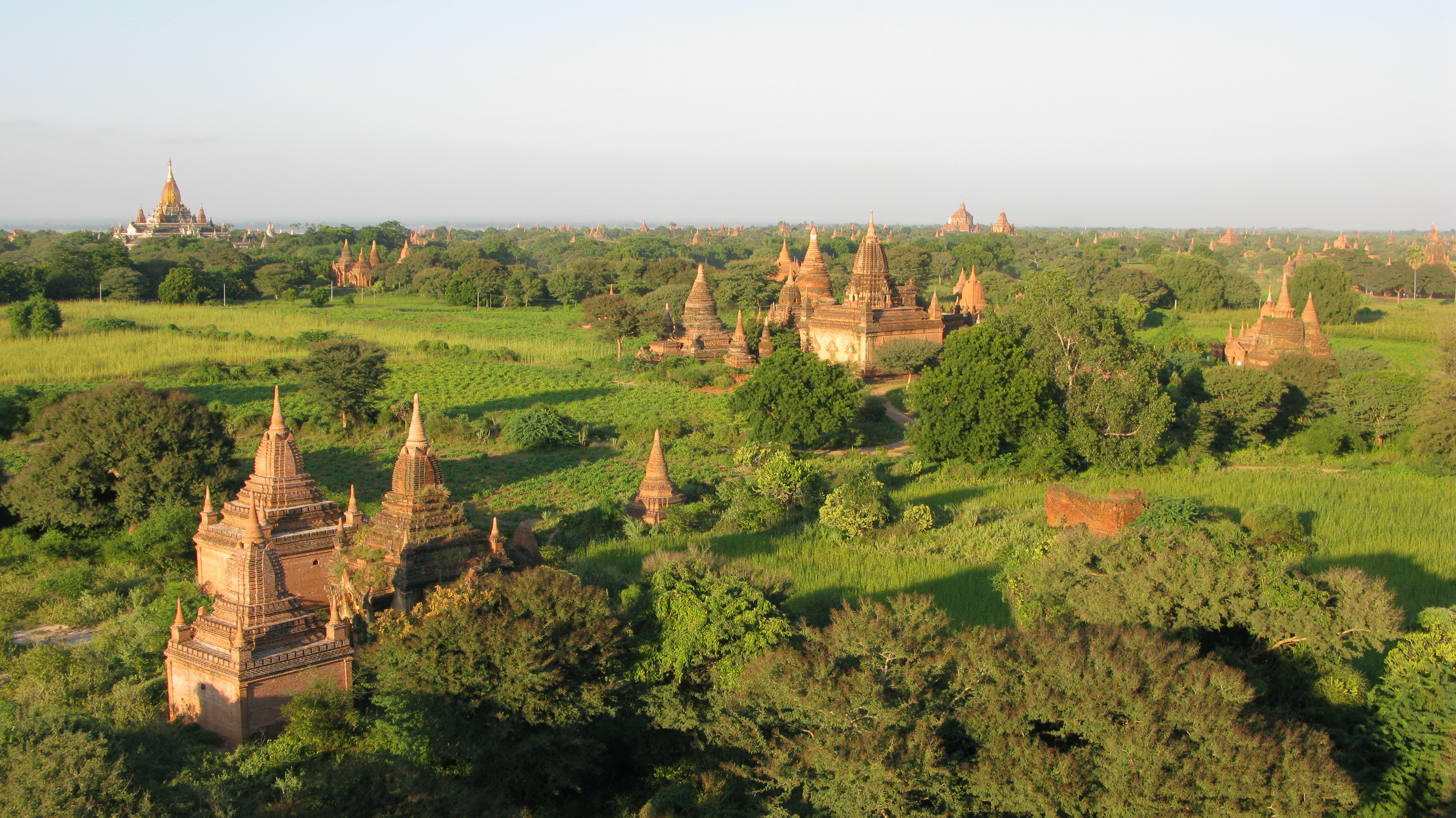
Bagan Plains

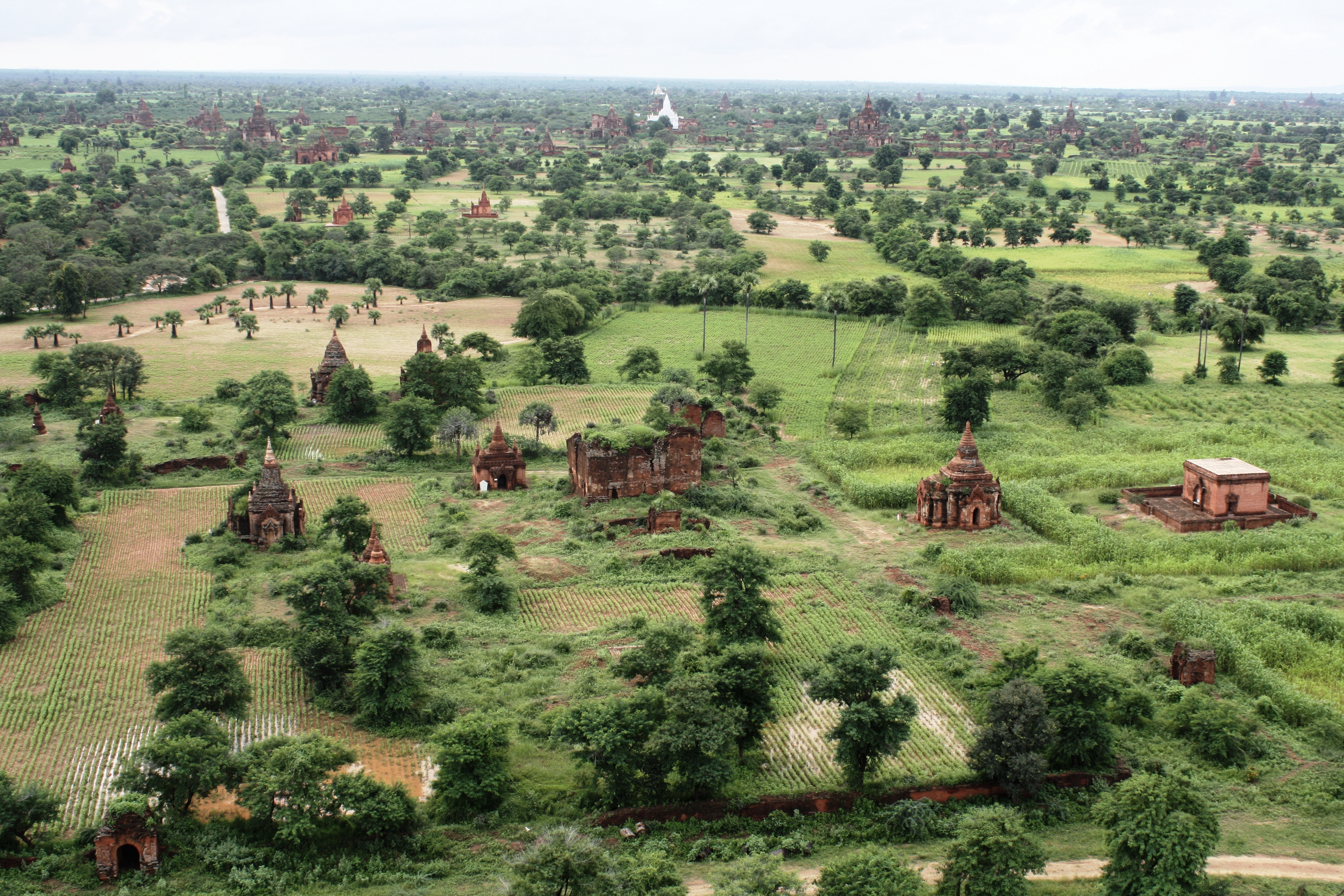
As seen from the Nanmyint Viewing Tower

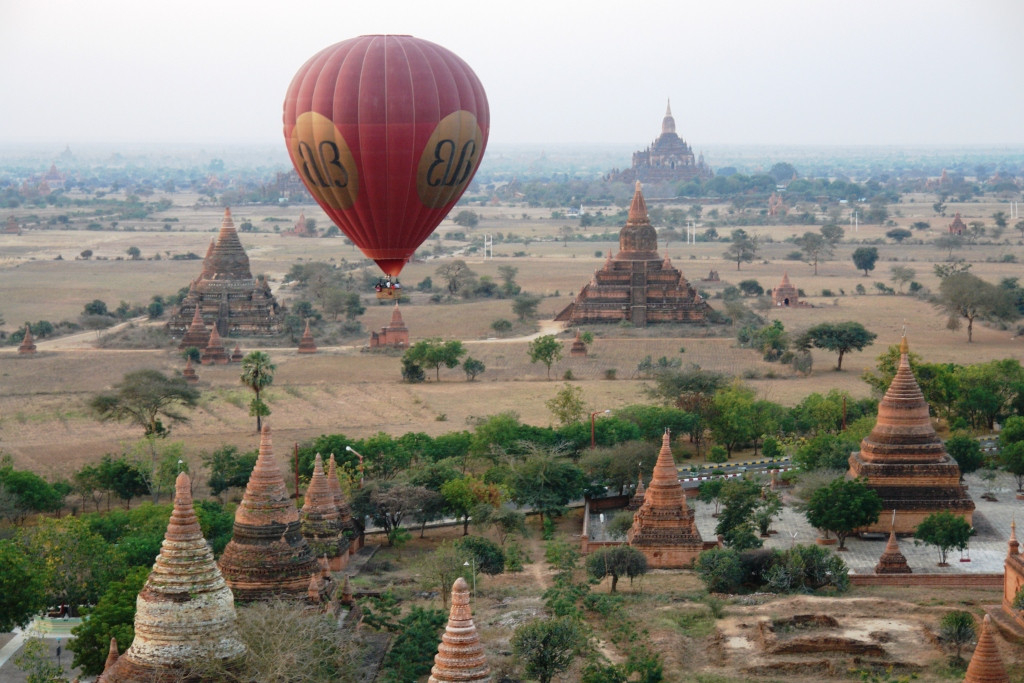
Aerial views from a hot air balloon

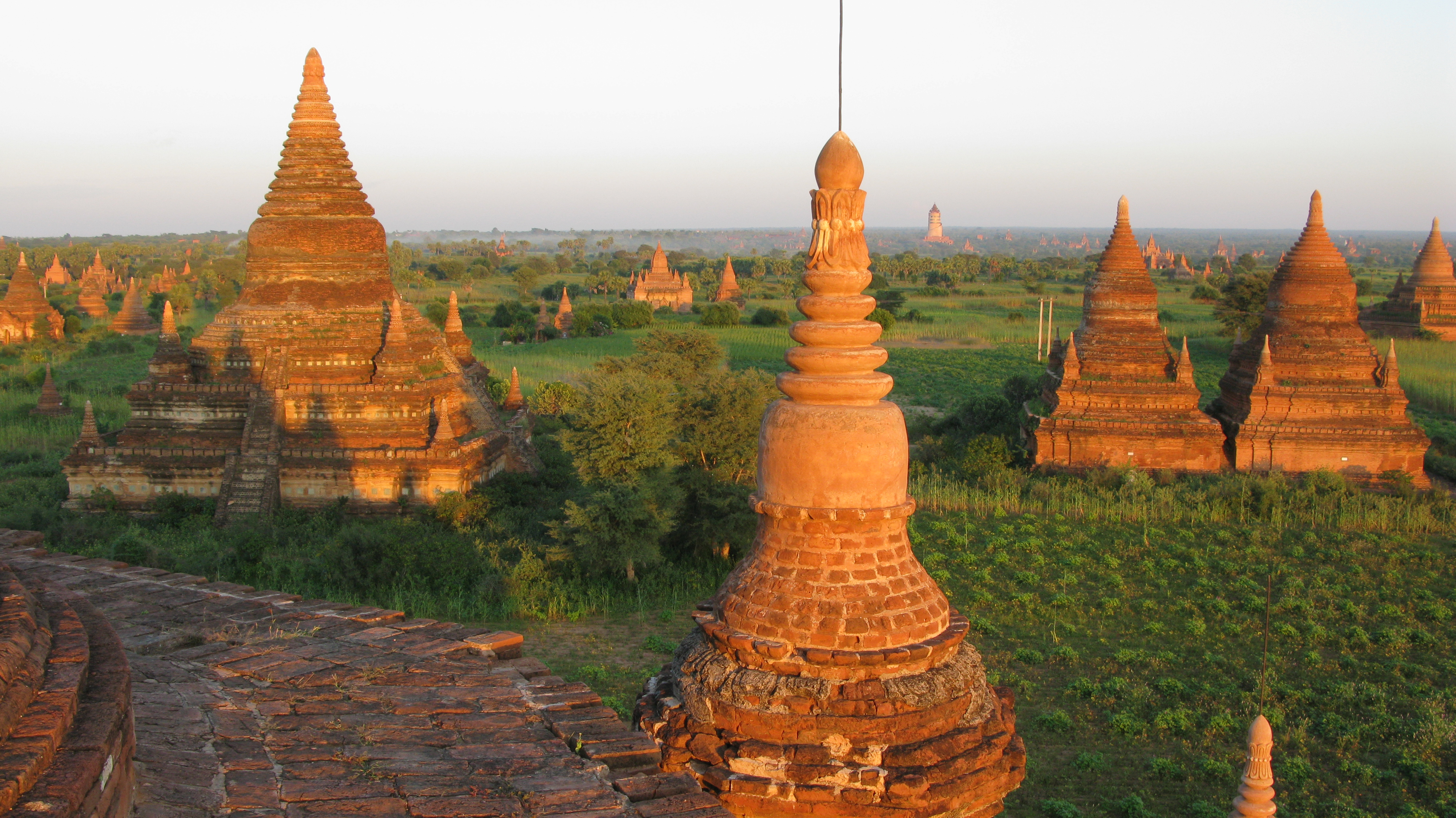
Bagan temples at sunset

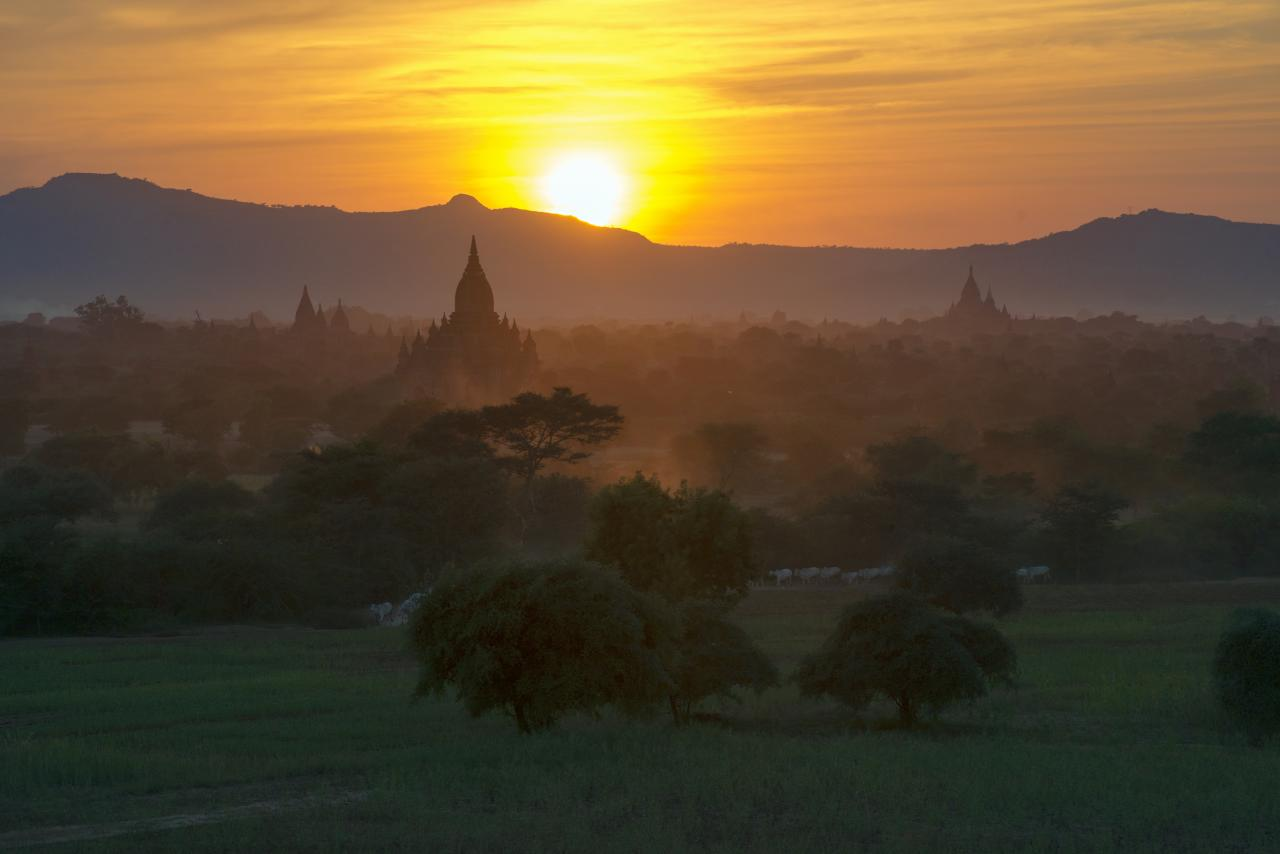
Bagan Plains at sunset

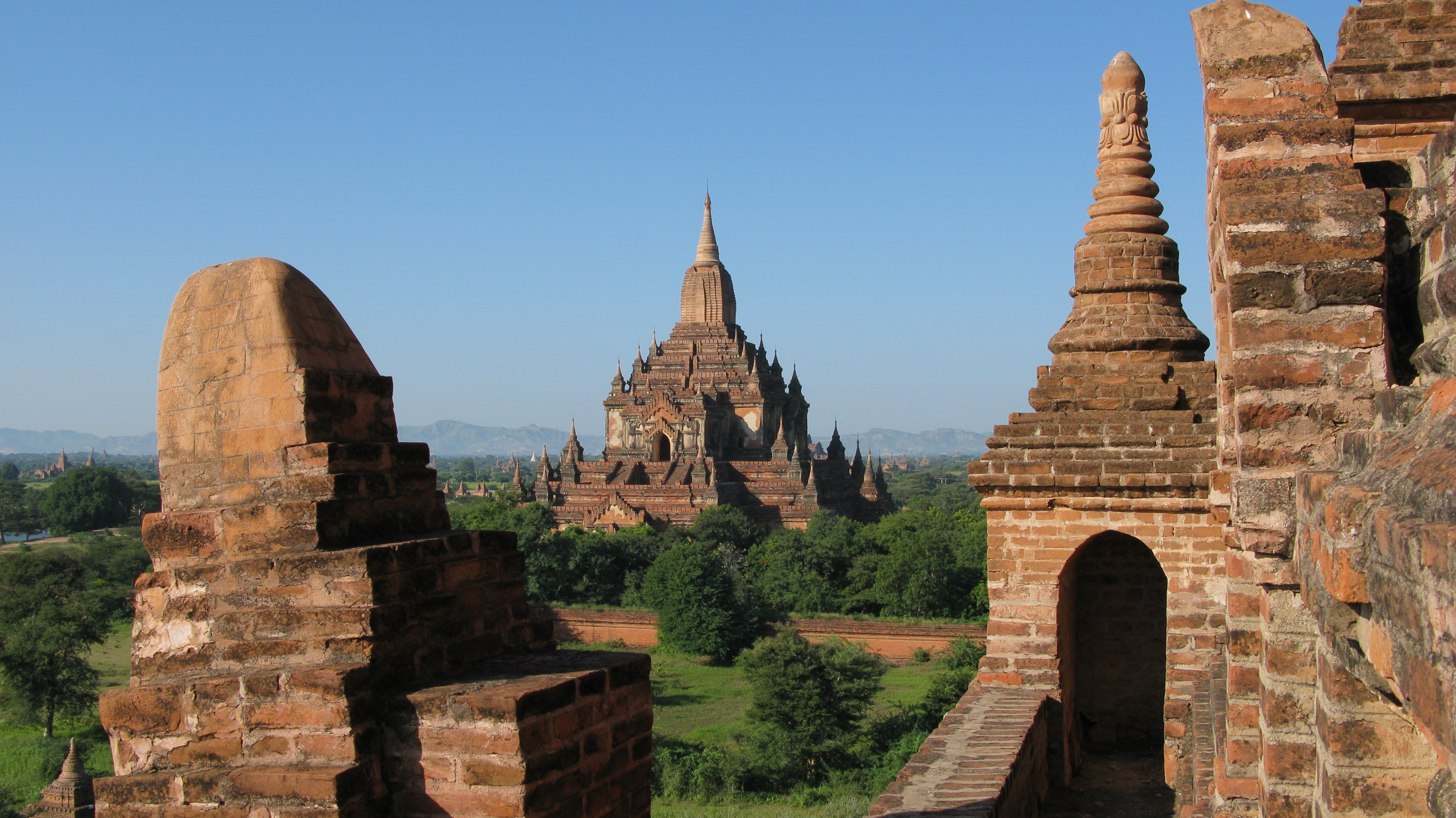
Htilominlo Temple and other temples

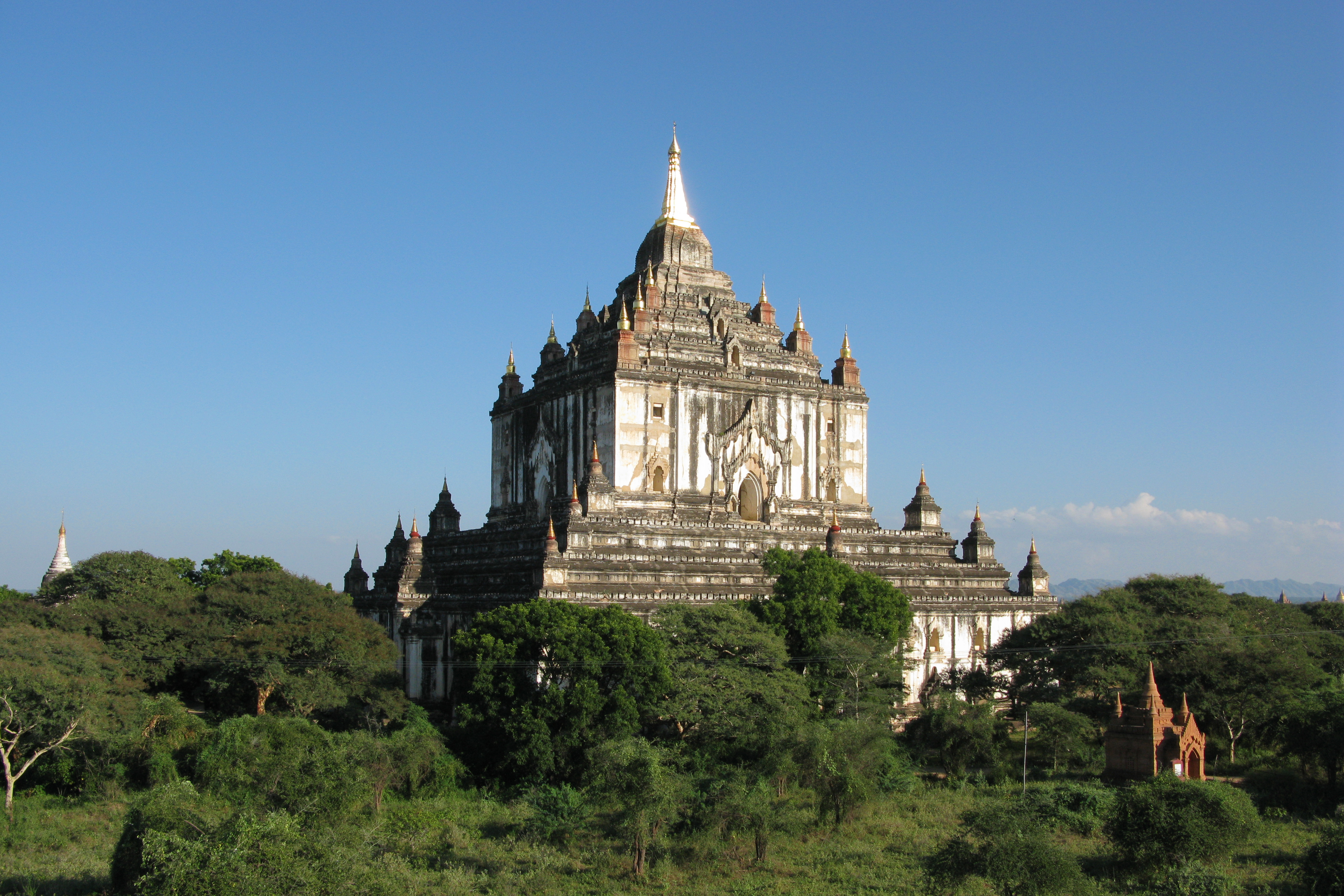
The Thatbyinnyu Temple

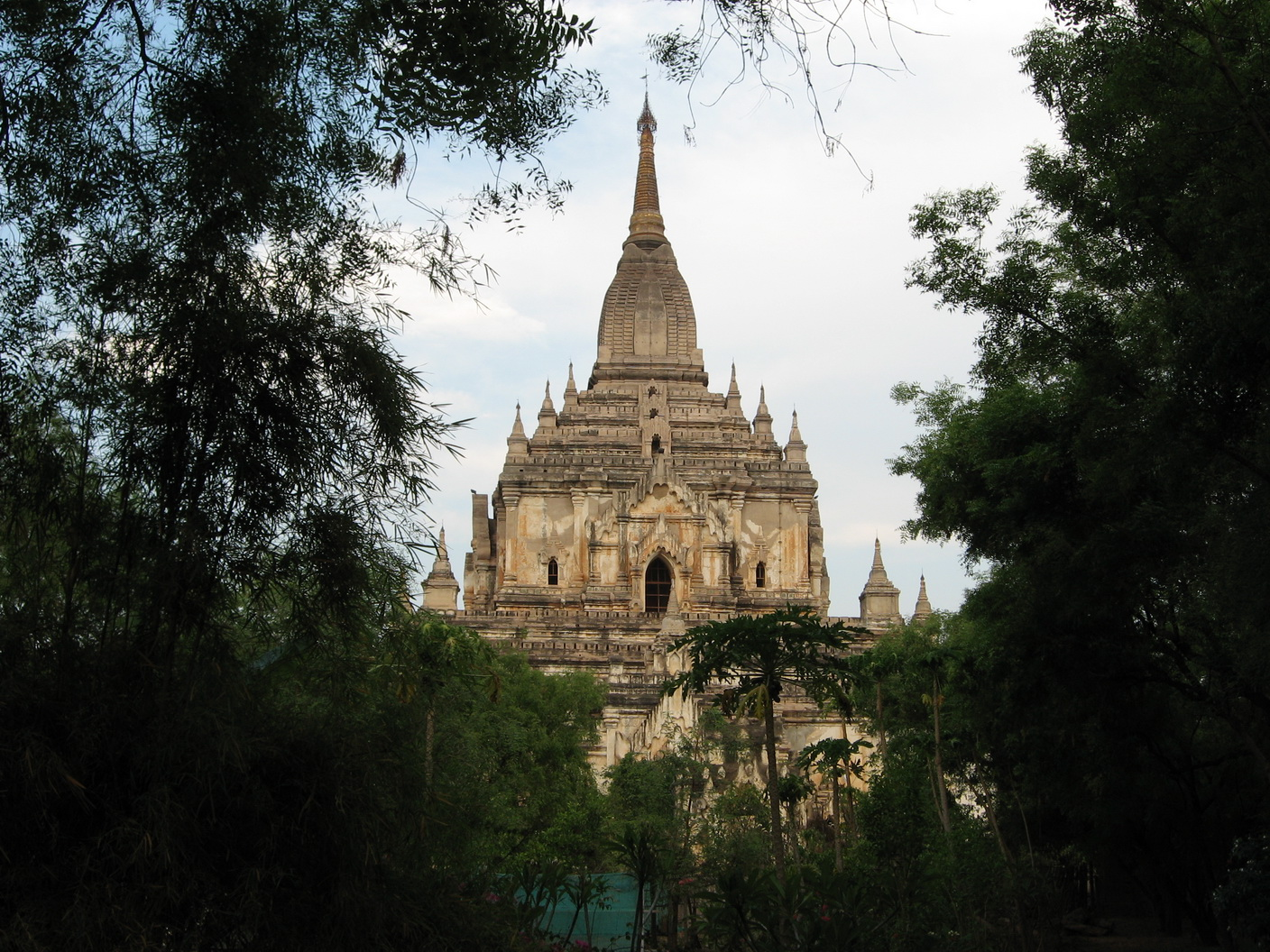
The Gawdawpalin

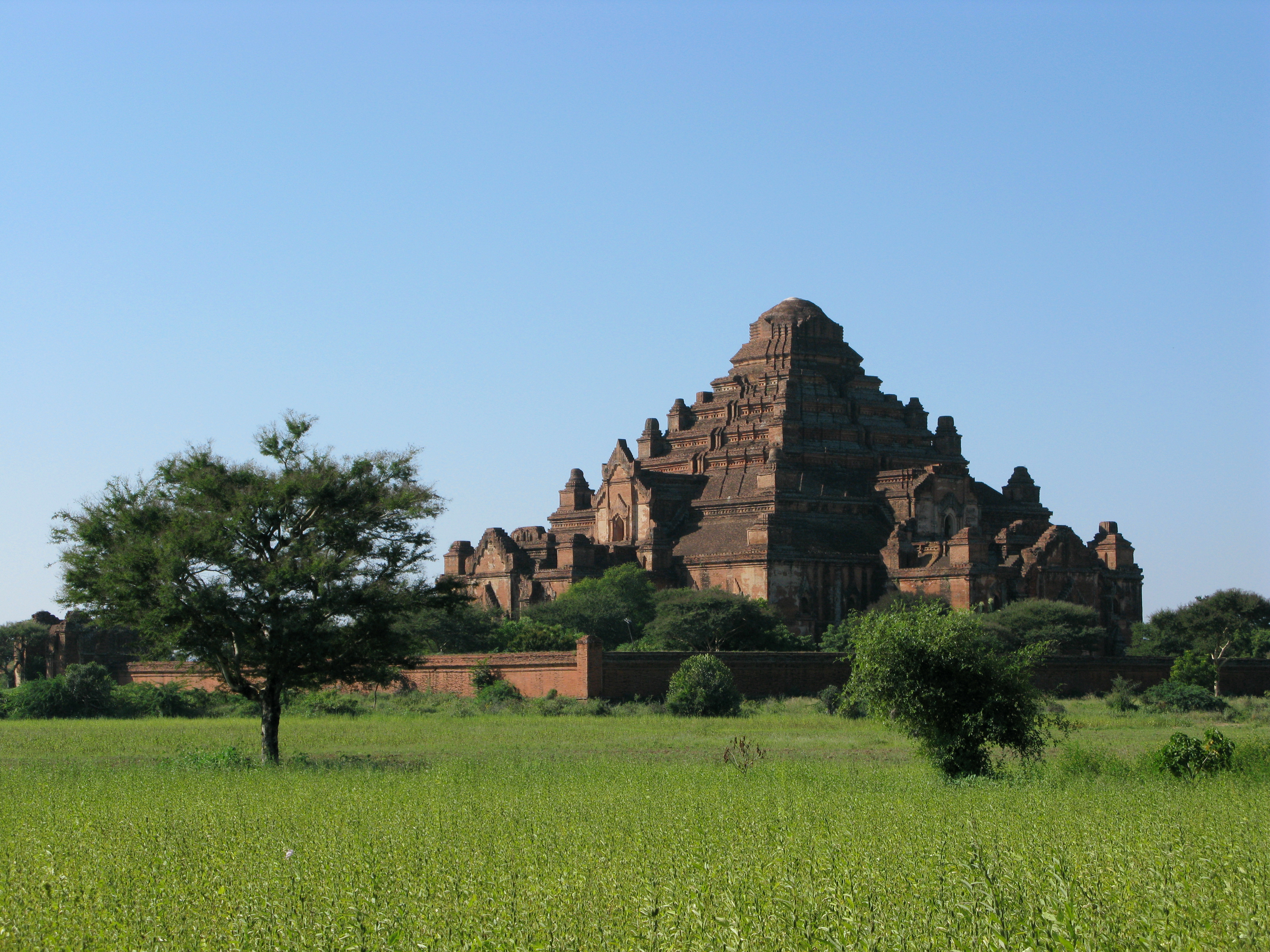
The Dhammayangyi

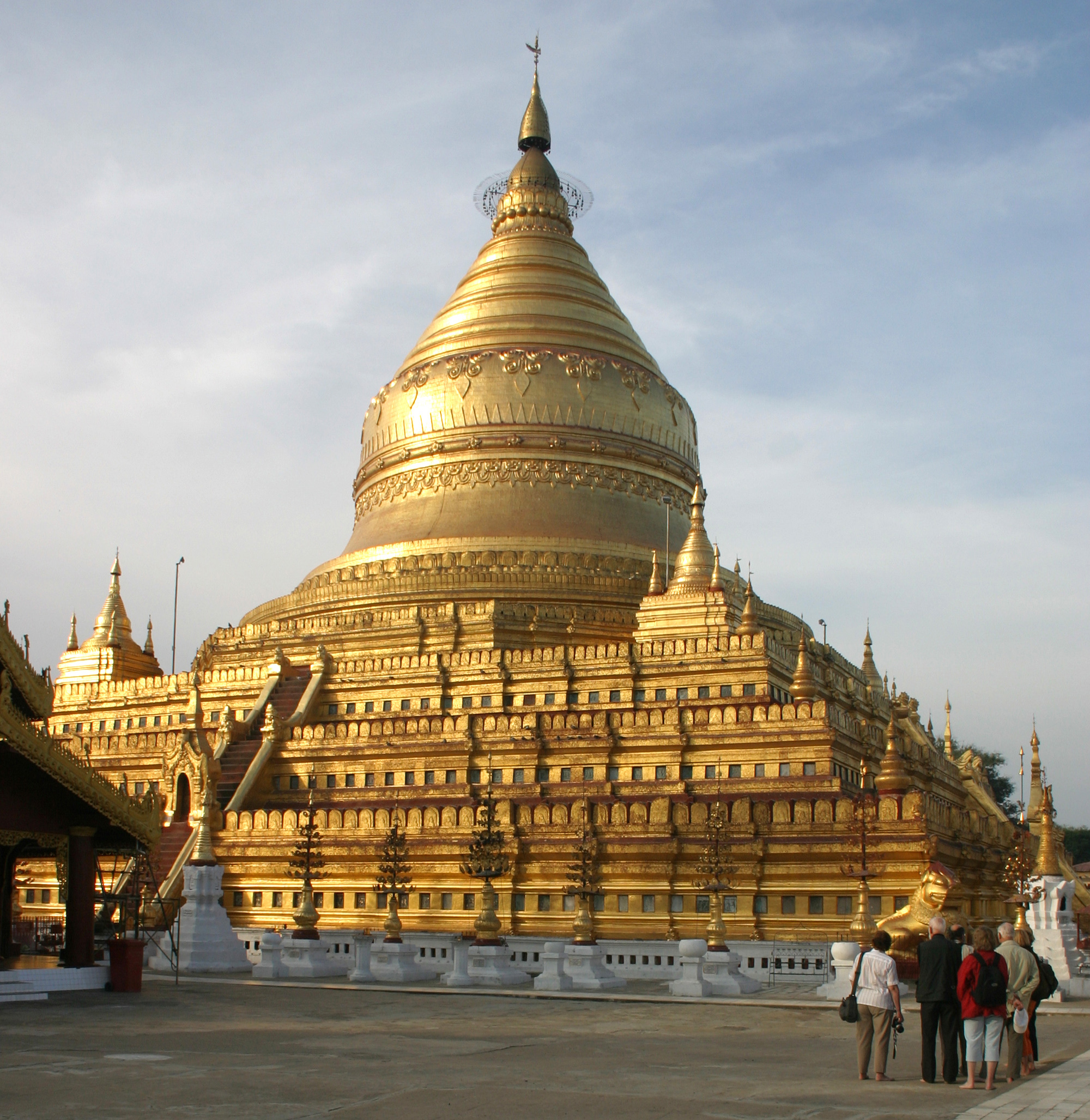
The Shwezigon

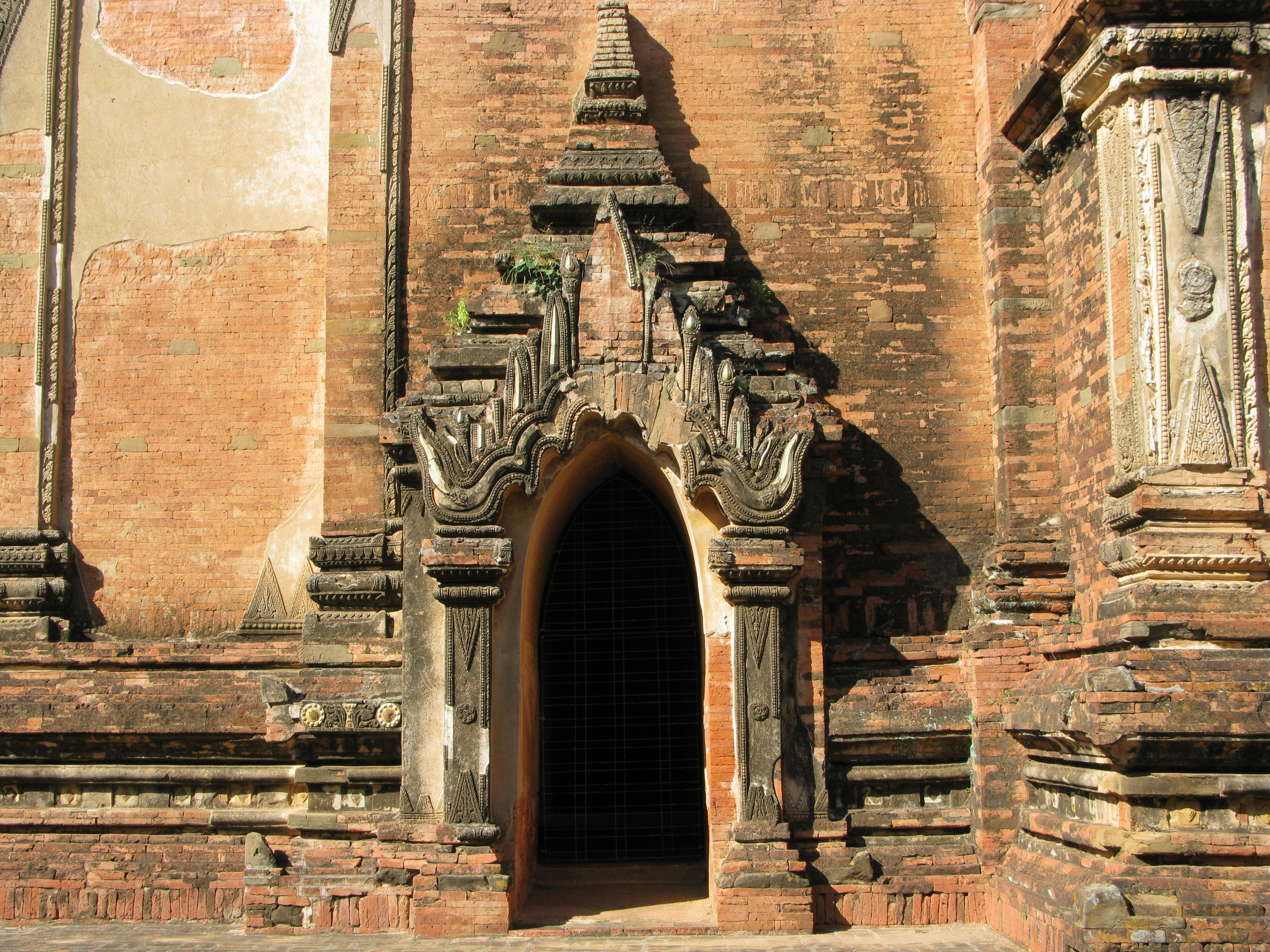
Doorway to a temple

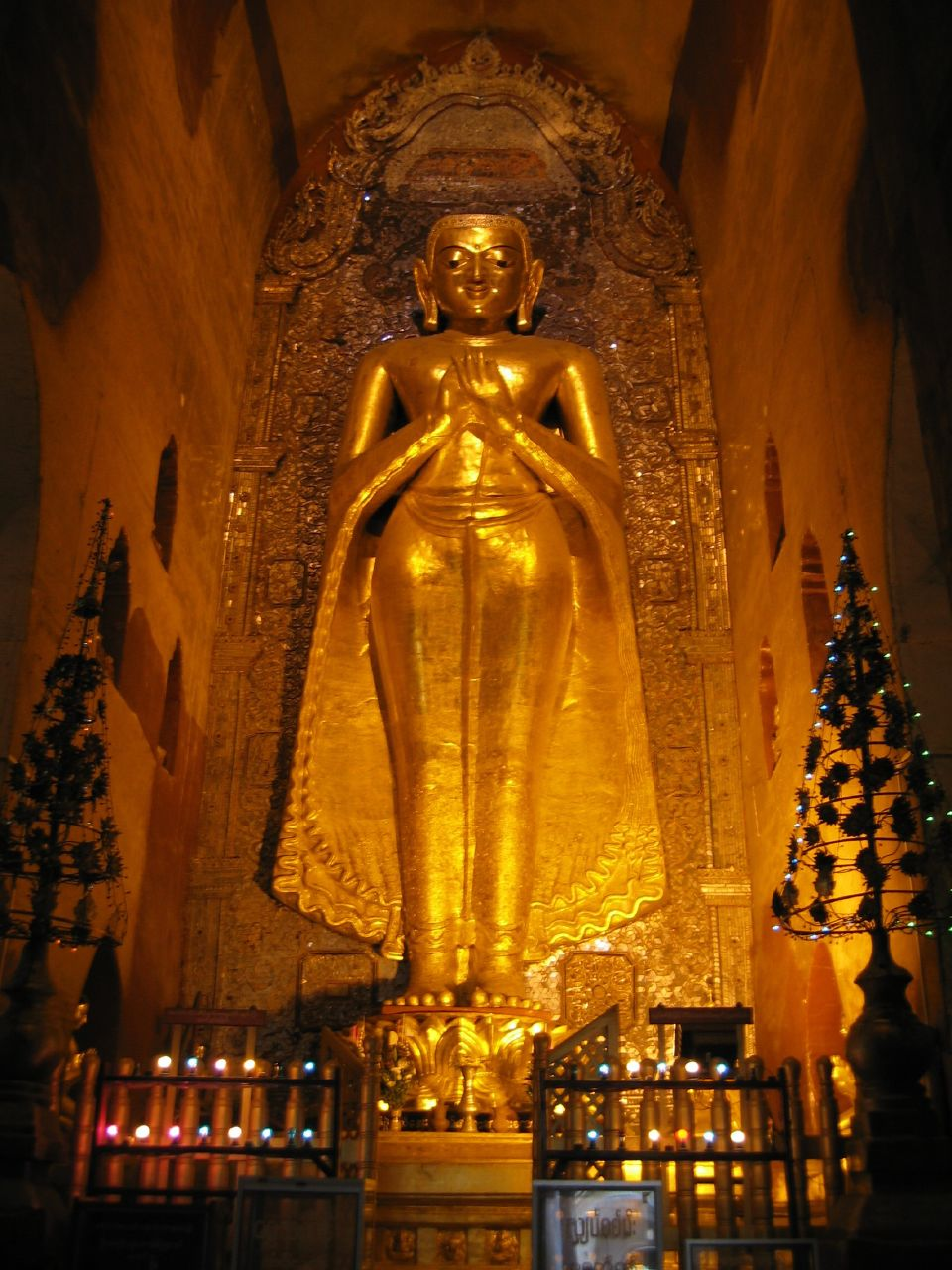
One of the main four Buddha statutes inside the Ananda

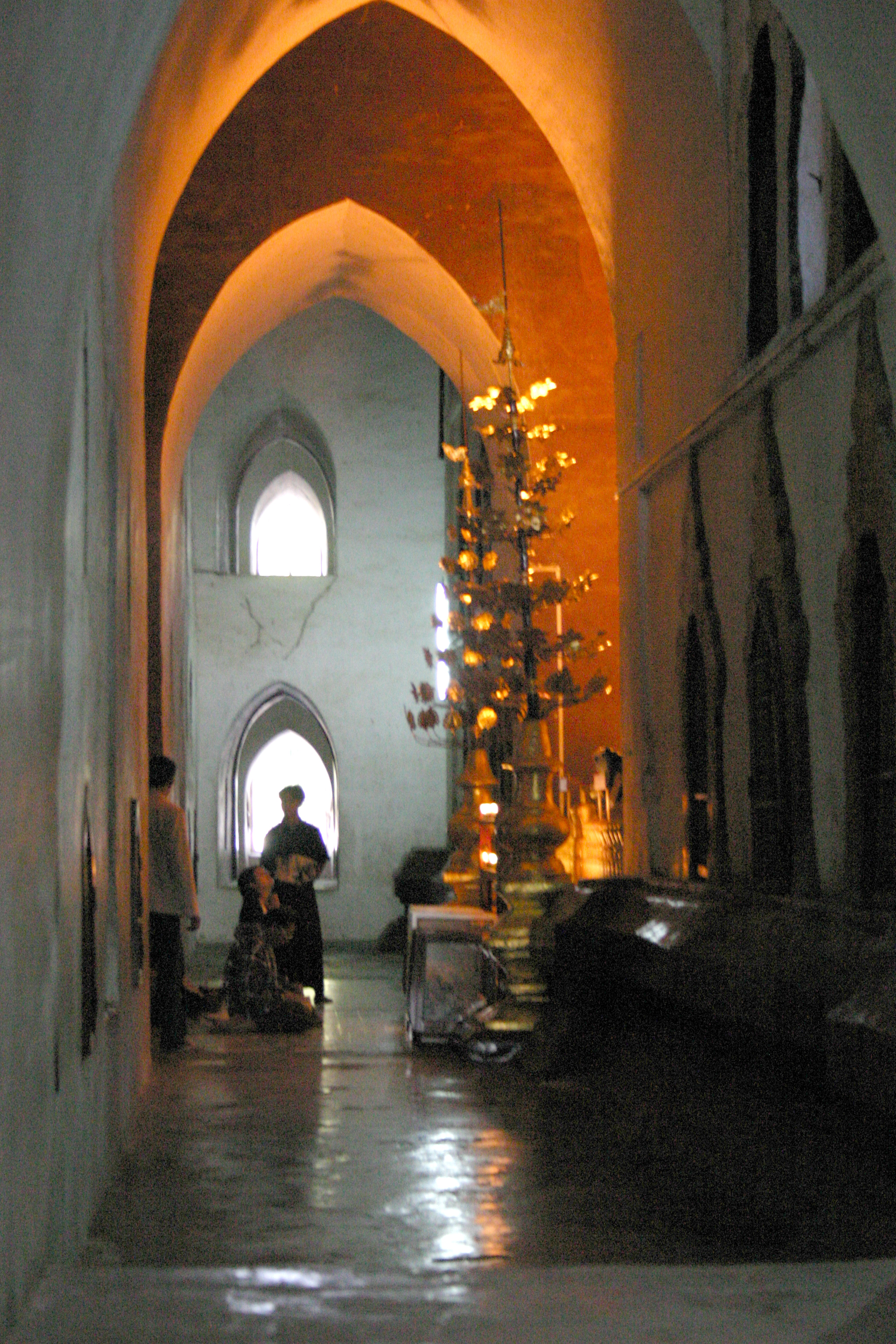
A hallway inside the Ananda

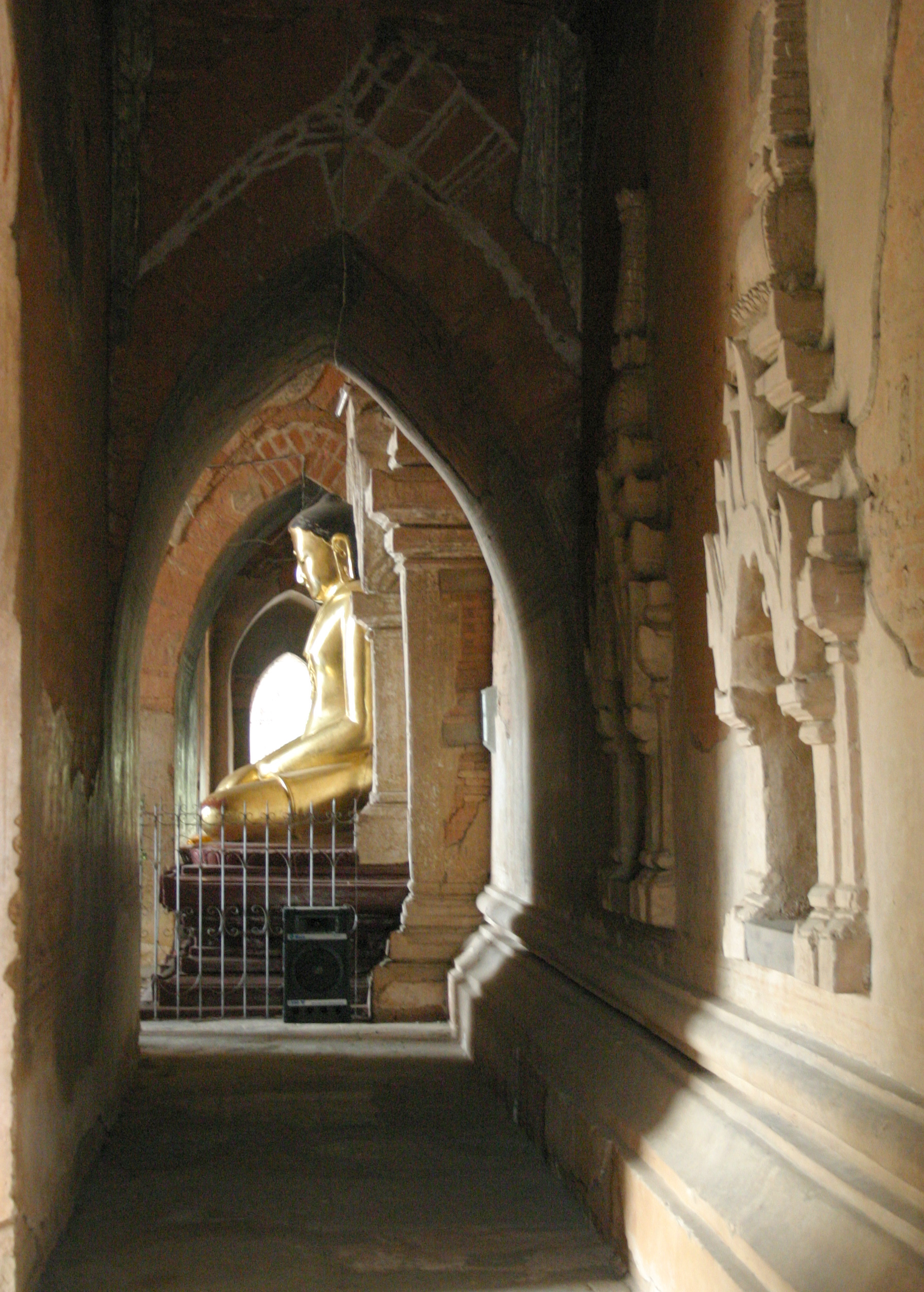
Inside the Htilominlo

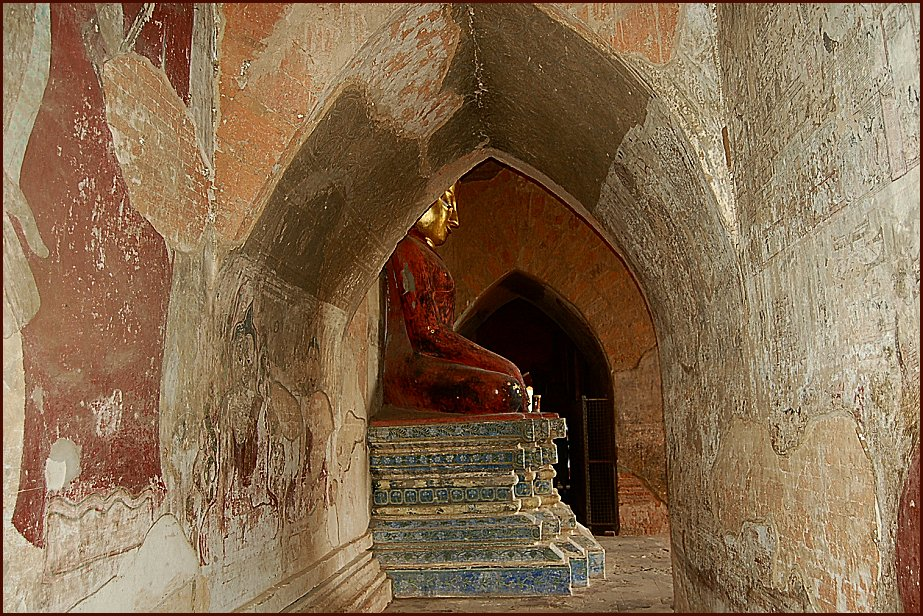
Frescoes inside a temple

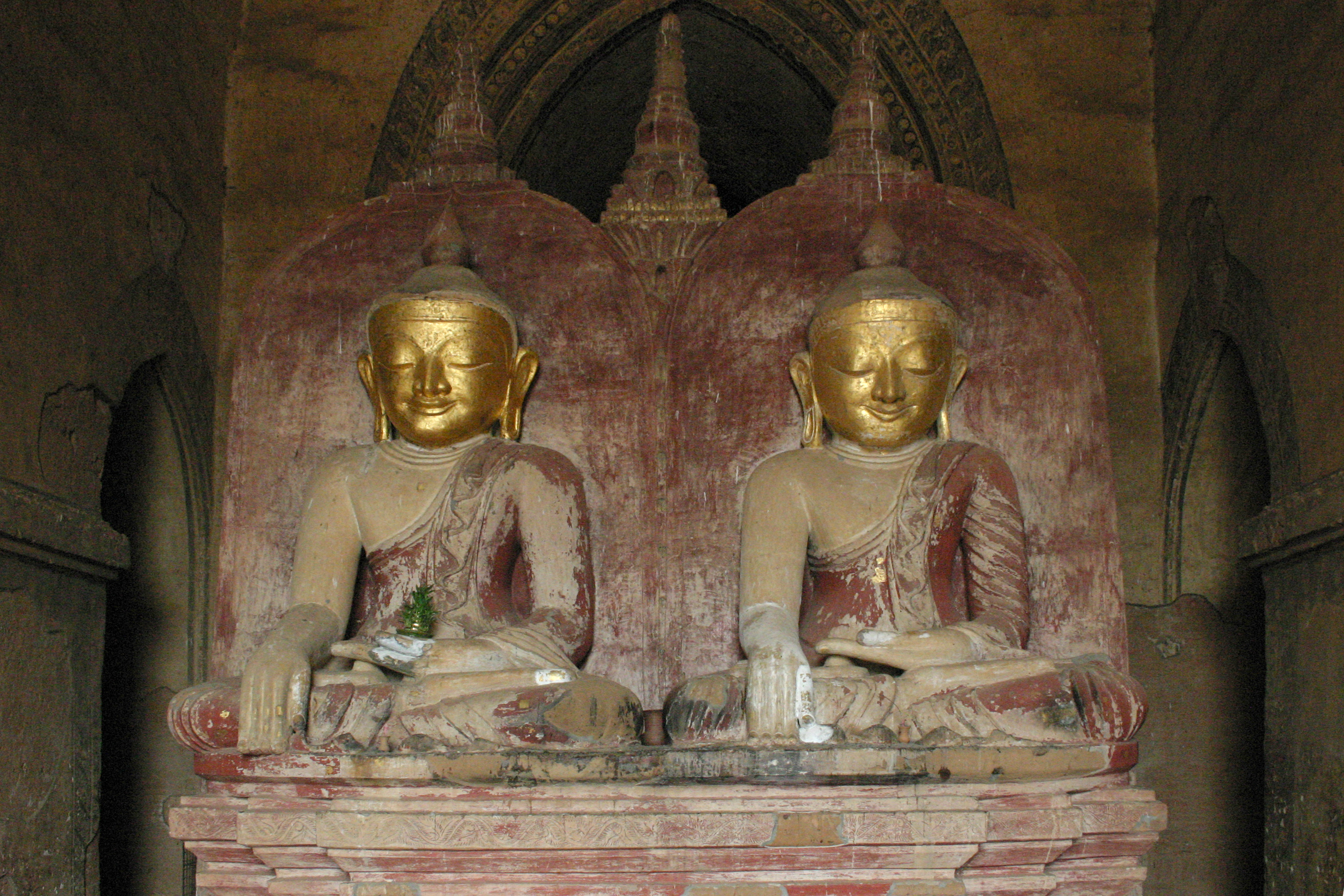
Buddha statutes inside the Dhammayangyi

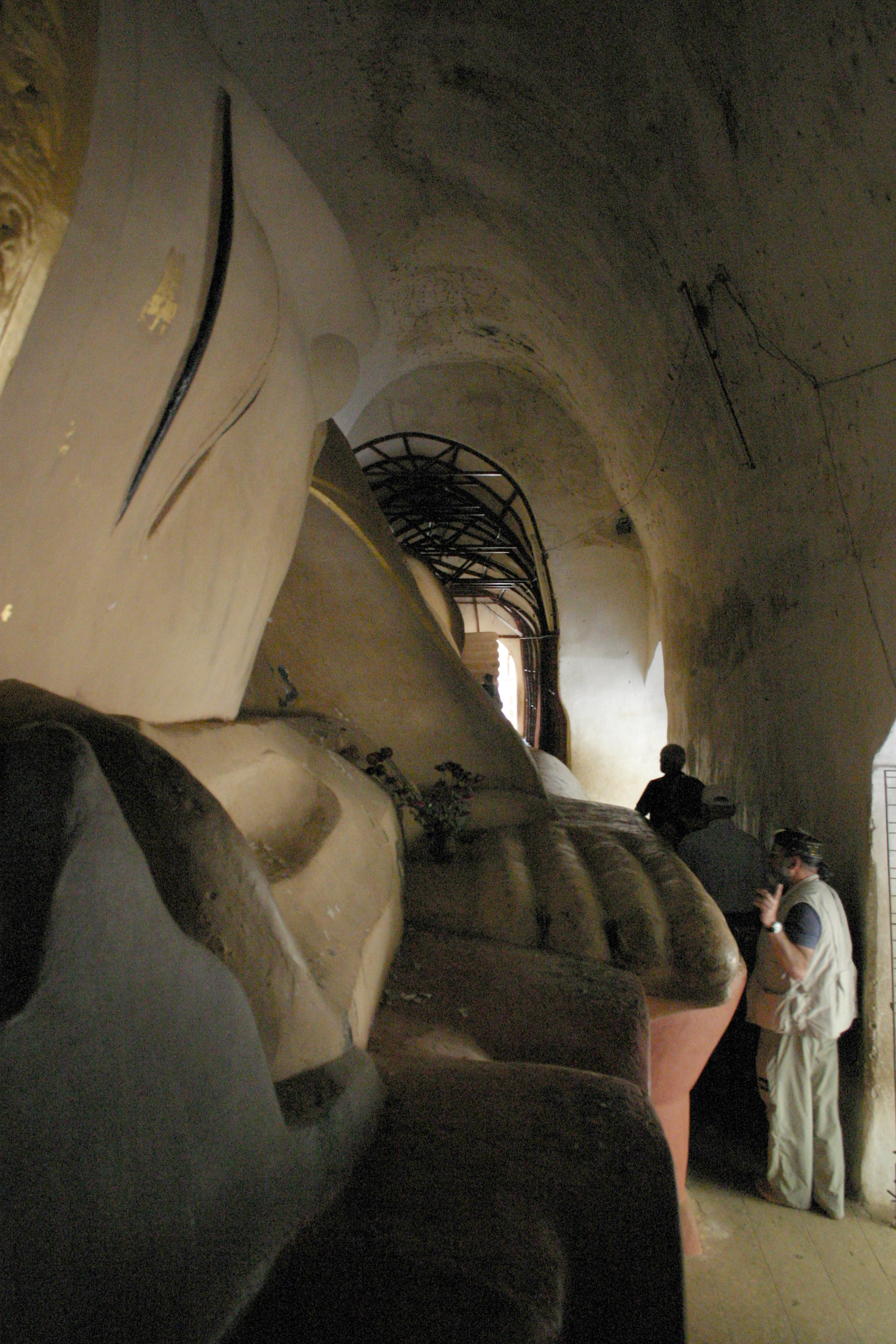
Inside the Manuha Temple

== See also ==
- Buddhism in Myanmar
- Burmese pagoda
- Pagoda festival
- Index of Buddhism-related articles
- List of Pagodas in Bagan

Bagan
Preceded by No national capital	Capital of Burma; 23 December 849 – 17 December 1297	Succeeded by Myinsaing, Mekkhaya, Pinle; Martaban; Launggyet
