= Myanmar architecture =

The architecture of Myanmar (formerly known as Burma), in Southeast Asia, includes architectural styles which reflect the influence of neighboring and Western nations and modernization. The country's most prominent buildings include Buddhist pagodas, stupas and temples, British colonial buildings, and modern renovations and structures. Myanmar's traditional architecture is primarily used for worship, pilgrimage, storage of Buddhist relics, political activism and tourism.

== History ==
=== Pyu period ===
Much of Myanmar's architecture is tied to ancient Indian architecture, and can be traced to the country's earliest known inhabitants. During the Pyu period, cylindrical stupas with four archways—often with a hti (umbrella) on top—were built. The Mon and Pyu people were the first two influential groups to migrate to Myanmar, and the first Indo-Chinese adherents of Theravada Buddhism. Beikthano, one of the first Pyu centers, contains urbanesque foundations which include a monastery and stupa-like structures. These Pyu stupas, the first Indian foundations in Myanmar, were built from 200 BC to 100 CE and were sometimes used for burial. Early stupas, temples and pagodas are topped with htis and finials or spires symbolizing Theravada Buddhist transcendence.

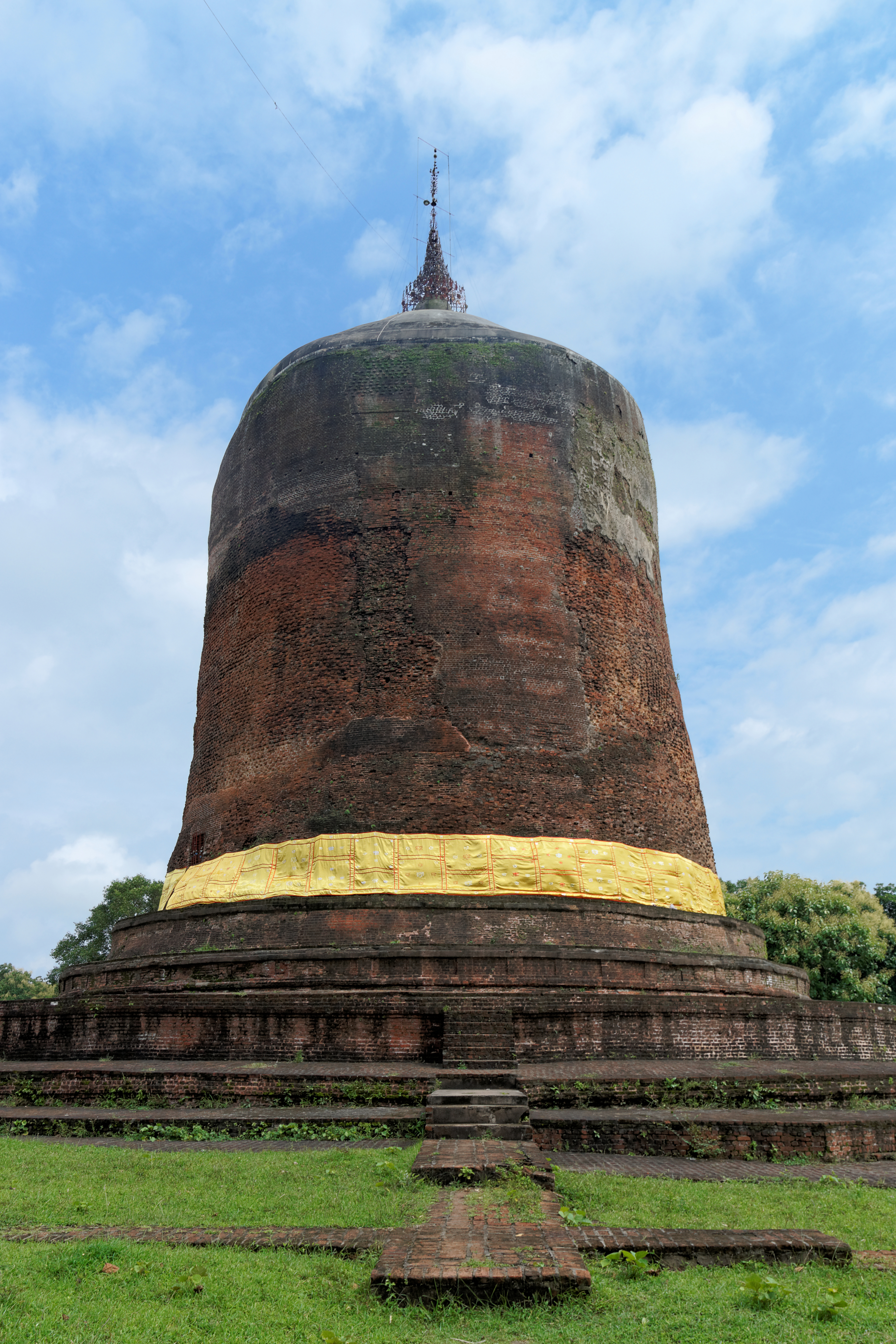
The Bawbawgyi Pagoda in Sri Ksetra

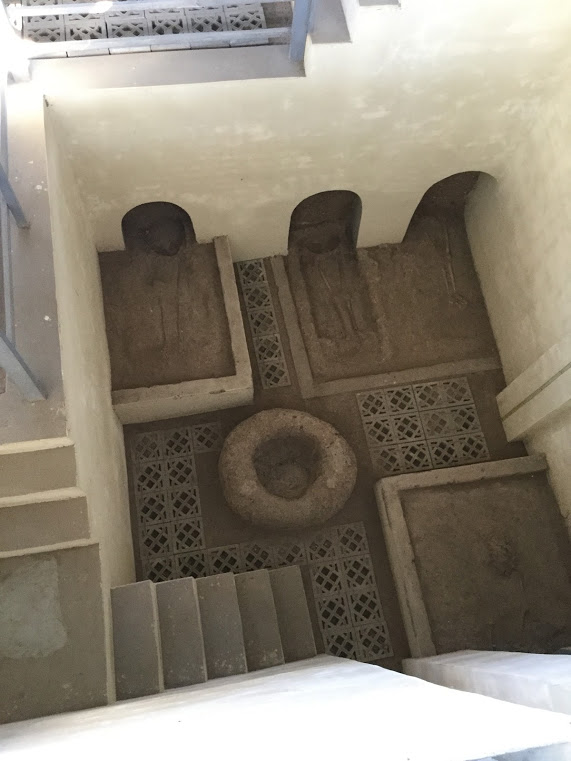
Excavated site in Hanlin

=== Bagan period ===
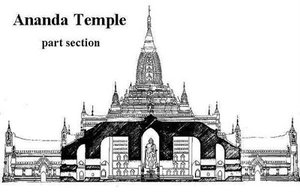

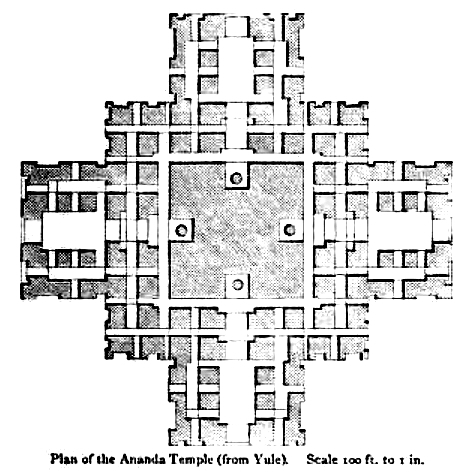
Plan of Ananda Temple

By the 9th century, the Bamar people had established a kingdom centered at Bagan. During the 11th century, King Anawrahta unified the Irrawaddy Valley region and founded the Pagan Empire. Bagan, with over 10,000 of Myanmar's red brick stupas and pagodas, had become a center of Buddhist architecture by the mid-12th century. During this period, the Pyu-style stupas were transformed into monuments reminiscent of alms bowls or gourd-shaped domes, unbaked brick, tapered and rising roofs, Buddha niches, polylobed arches and ornamental doorways influenced by India's Pala Empire and its monuments. Stucco was widely used in Bagan, especially by the Mon people. Stucco features of Bagan structures include garlands, flames or rays of the sun, peacock tail feathers and mythical creatures.

The Dhammayazika Pagoda has a plan similar to the Tantric Paharpur stupa in India. It does not have a square base like many Bagan stupas; instead, it has a pentagonal base with radial halls and low skirting.

The Ananda Temple (finished in 1090), one of the first temples erected in Bagan, was influenced by Indian architecture. The vaulted temple represents the Theravada branch of Buddhism, Bagan's official religion when it was built. Architectural features of the temple include brick vaulted halls, Buddha statues, tapered roofs and the absence of terraces. The temple has one of the first uses of the pyatthat, or tiered roof, which indicates the presence of a throne within. With both royal and religious symbolism, many of the temple's images depict the Buddha seated before an odd number of pyatthat tiers.

Many of Bagan's historical monuments are well-preserved, due to the dry climate. Bagan, with one of the largest concentrations of temples in the world, is one of Myanmar's most important pilgrimage sites. Many of the temples' paintings and murals are still visible. Notable architectural sites in Bagan include the Bupaya Pagoda, the Dhammayangyi, Gawdawpalin and Htilominlo Temples, the Inn-hpaya Stupa, the Mahabodhi Temple, the Mingalazedi Pagoda, the Minochantha stupa group, the Taung Kyaung monastery, the Nathlaung Kyaung Temple, the Nga-kywe-na-daung Stupa, the Pahto Thamya and Shwegugyi Temples, the Shwezigon Pagoda and the Sulamani and Thatbyinnyu Temple.

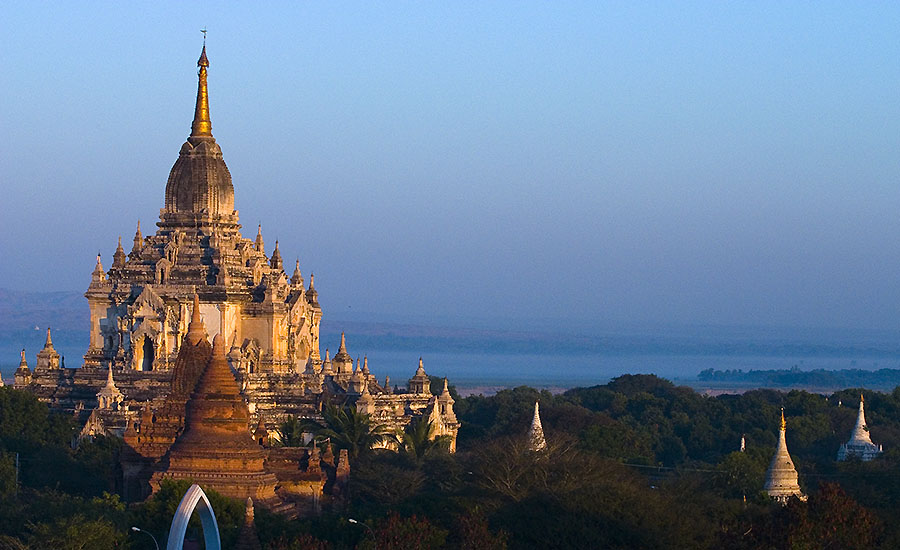
The Gawdawpalin Temple in Bagan was built during the 12th century

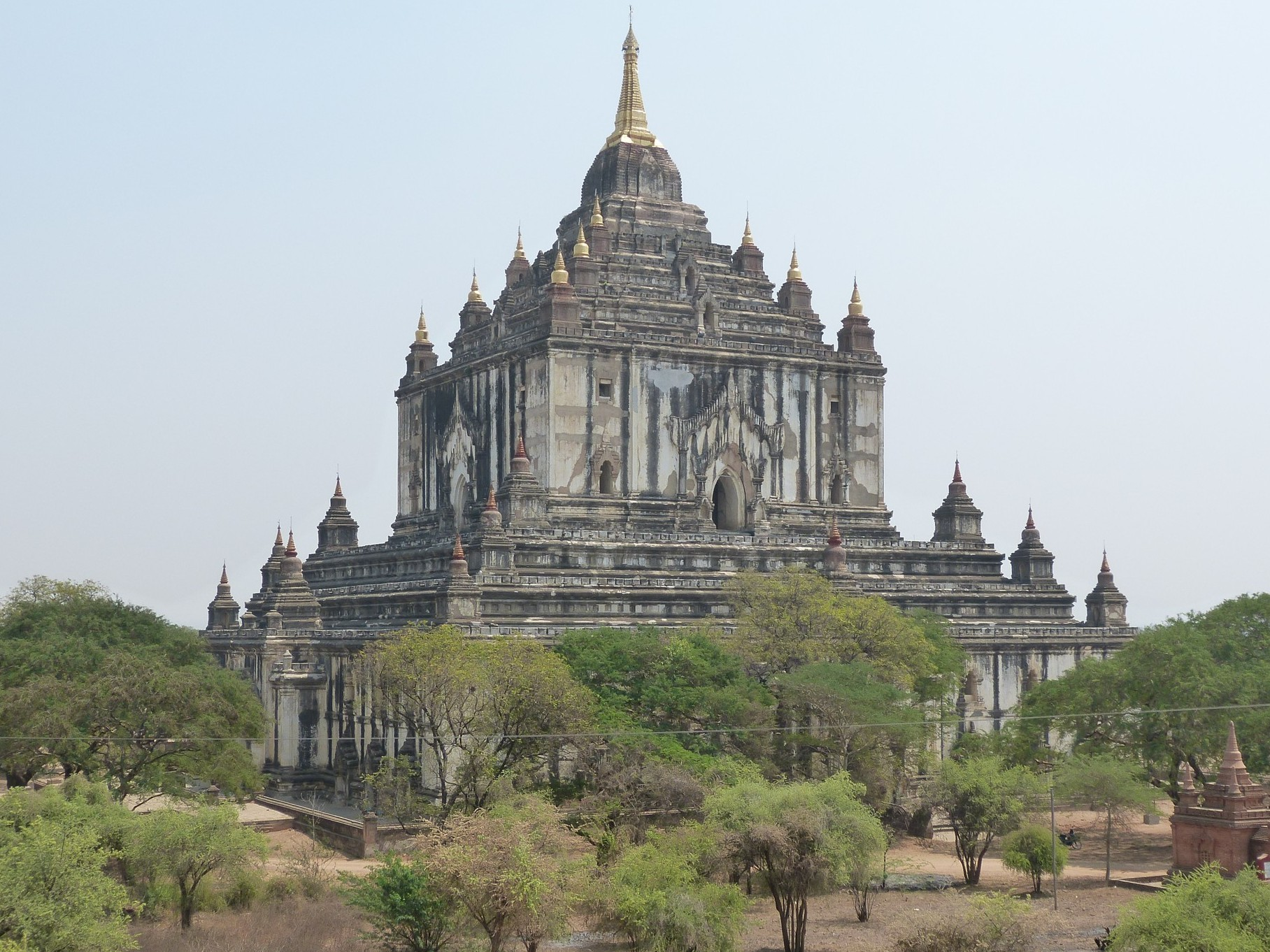
The Thatbyinnyu Temple in Bagan was built by King Alaungsithu in the mid-12th century.

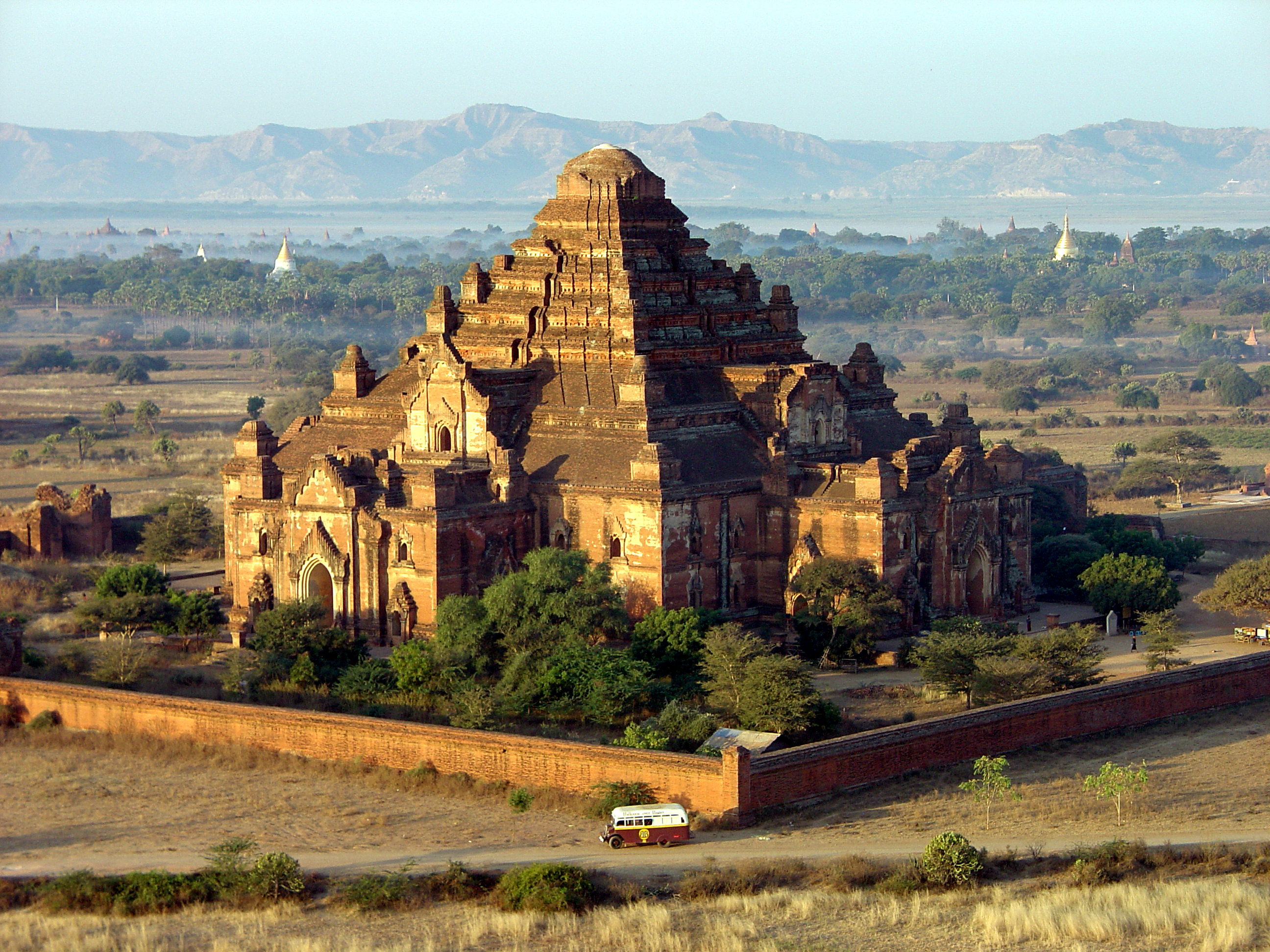
The Dhammayangyi Temple, Bagan's largest

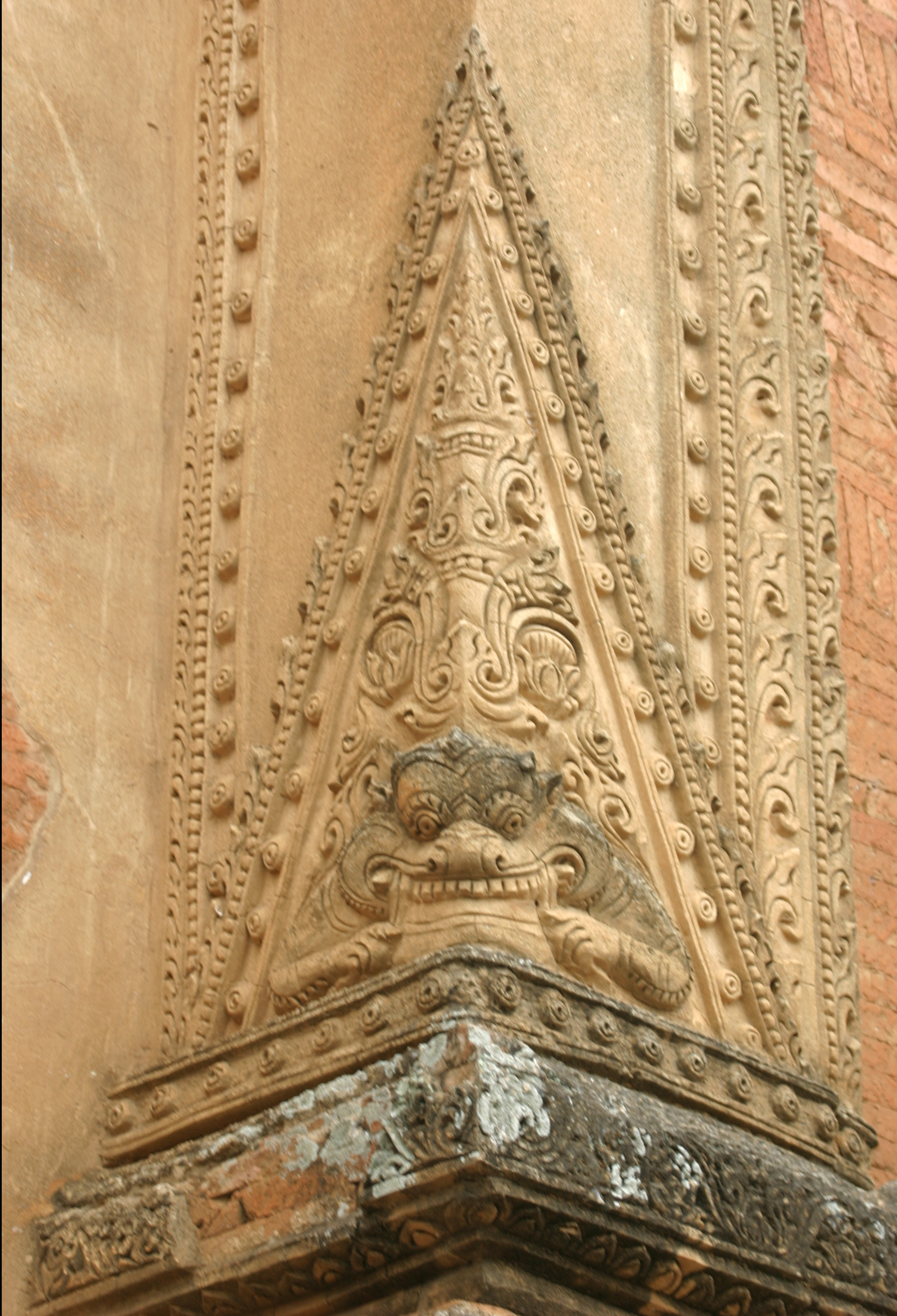
Htilominlo Temple's stucco ornamentation

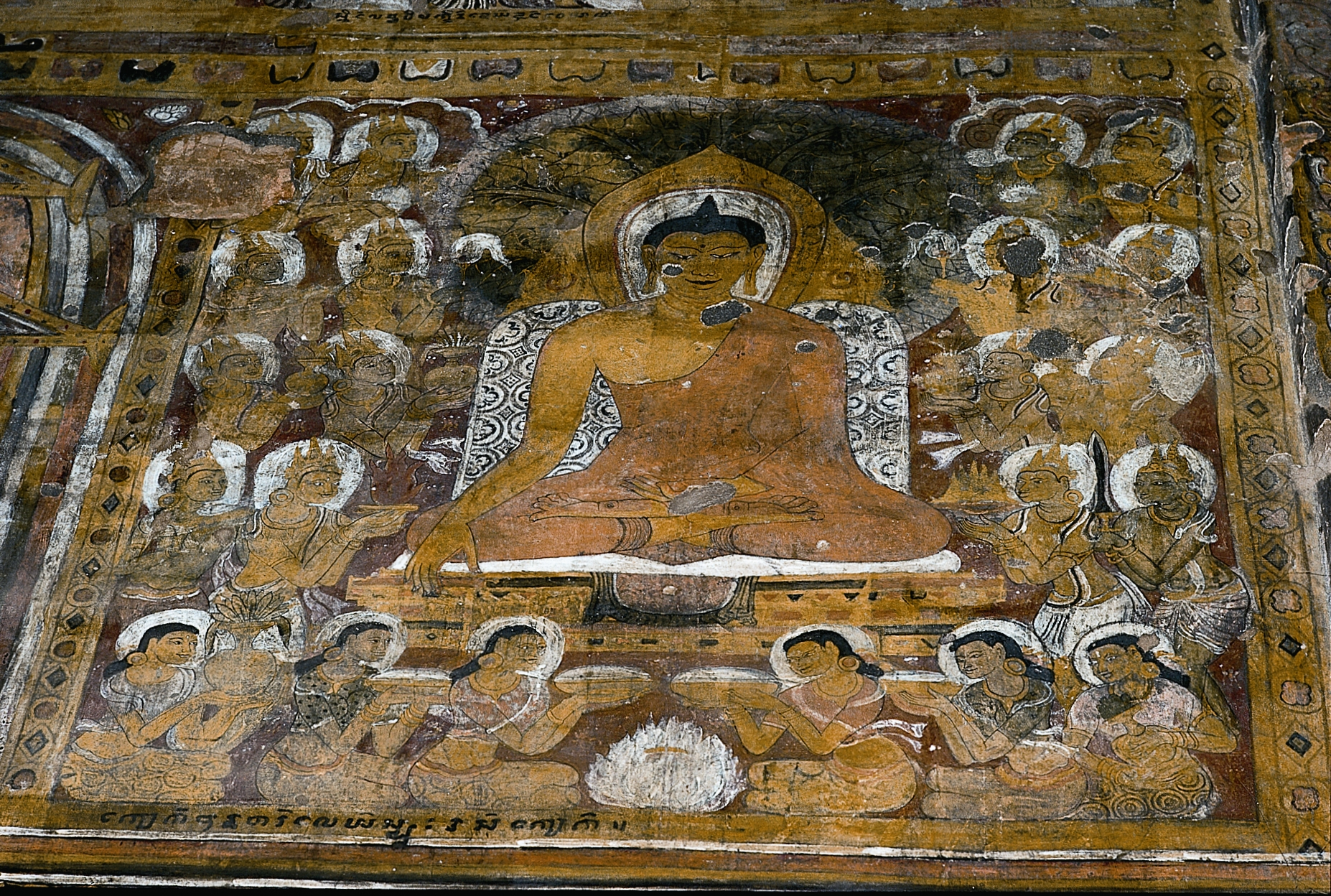
Frescoes in the Gubyaukgyi Temple (Myinkaba)

=== Konbaung period ===
Burmese dynasties had a long history of building regularly planned cities along the Irawaddy valley between the 14th to 19th century. Town planning in pre-modern Burma reached its climax during the Konbaung period with cities such as Amarapura and Mandalay. Alaungpaya directed many town planning initiatives, building fortified towns with major defences, including the city of Yangon, which was founded in 1755 as a fortress and sea harbor. The city had an irregular plan with stockades made of teak logs on a ground rampart. Rangoon had six city gates with each gate flanked by massive brick towers with typical merlons with cross-shaped embrasures. The city was established near the older Mon town of Dagon and preexisting stupas of Shwedagon, Sule and Botataung were located outside the city walls. The city had main roads paved with bricks and drains along the sides.

This period also saw a proliferation of stupas and temples with developments in stucco techniques. Wooden monasteries of this period intricately decorated with wood carvings of the Jataka Tales are one of the more prominent distinctive examples of traditional Burmese architecture that survive to the present day. One prominent example is Shweinbin Monastery, built in 1895 in the tradition of Burmese teak architecture. The monastery's construction strictly adheres to traditional rules of Burmese monastic architecture and includes all of the designated pyatthat-crowned pavilions.

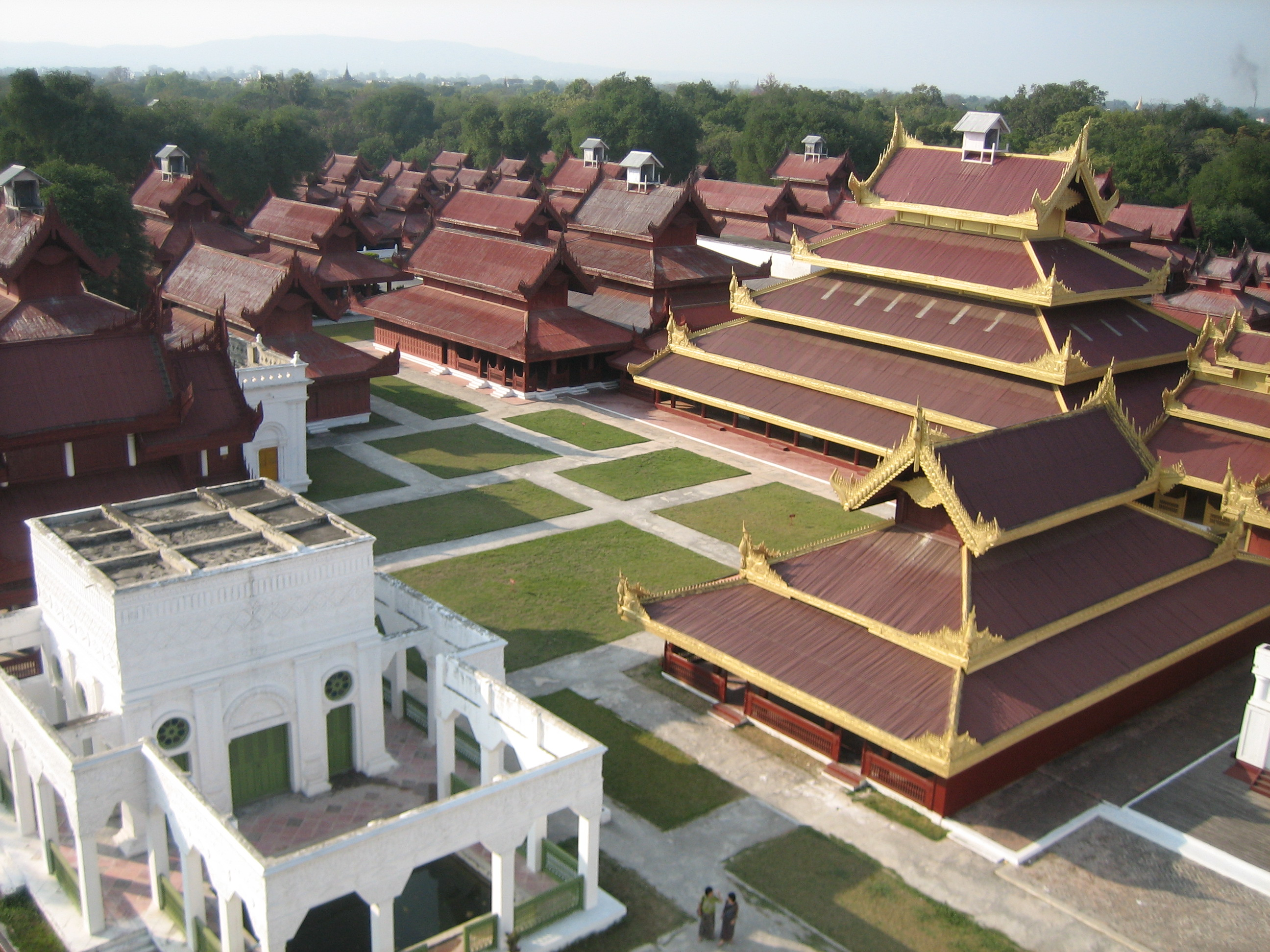
The royal palace of Mandalay

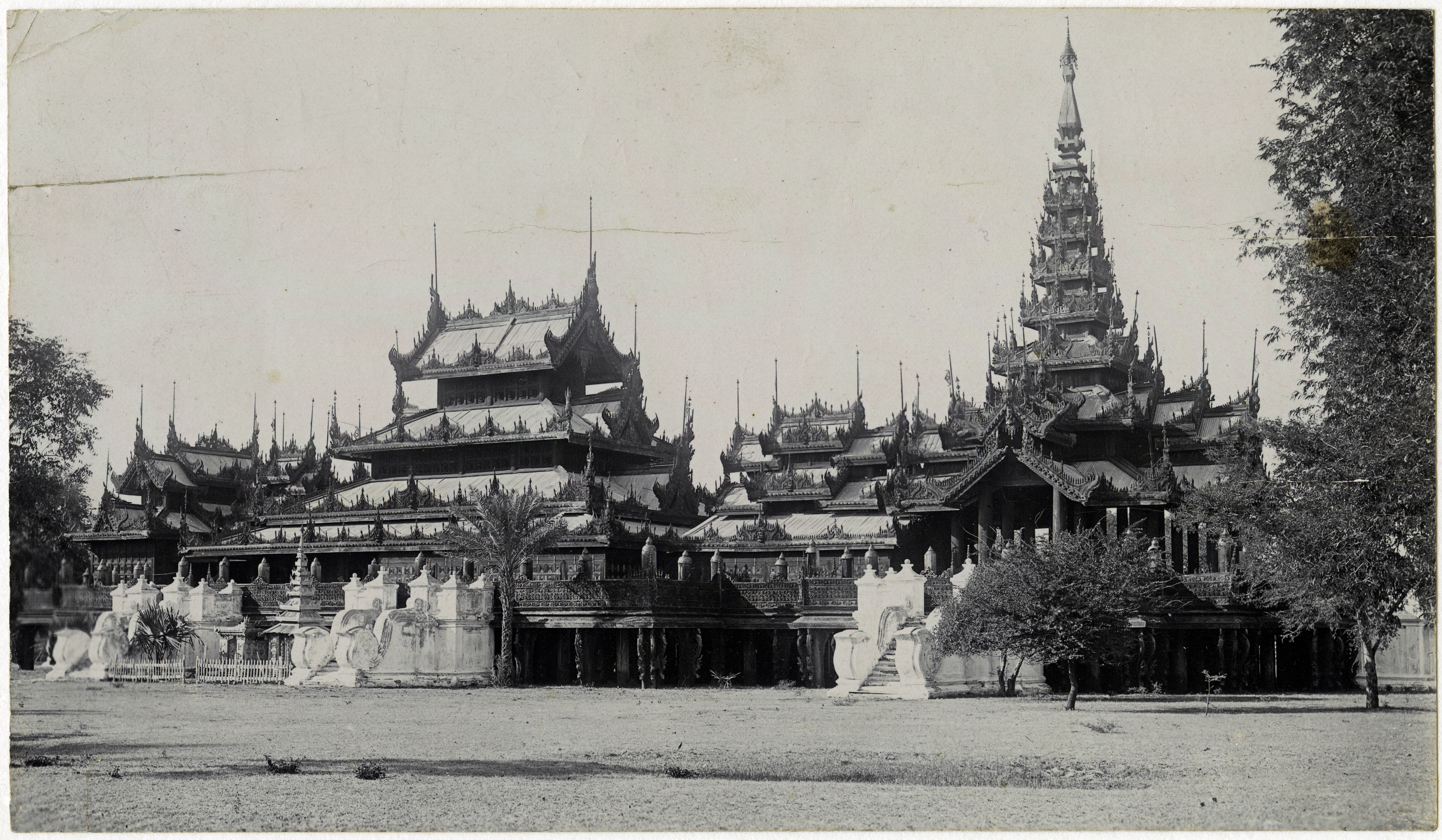
Shweinbin Monastery in about 1900

=== Colonial era ===
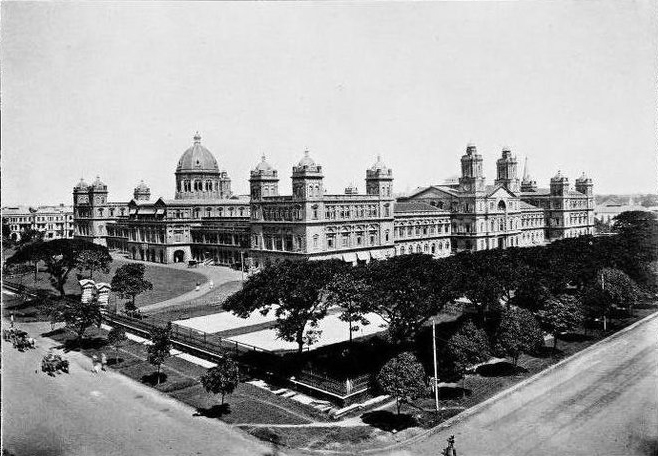
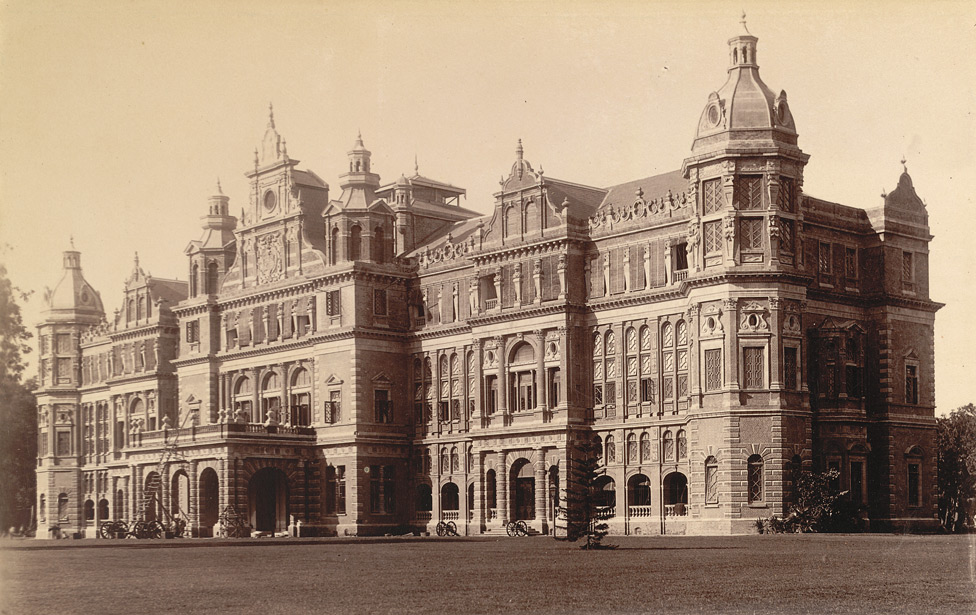
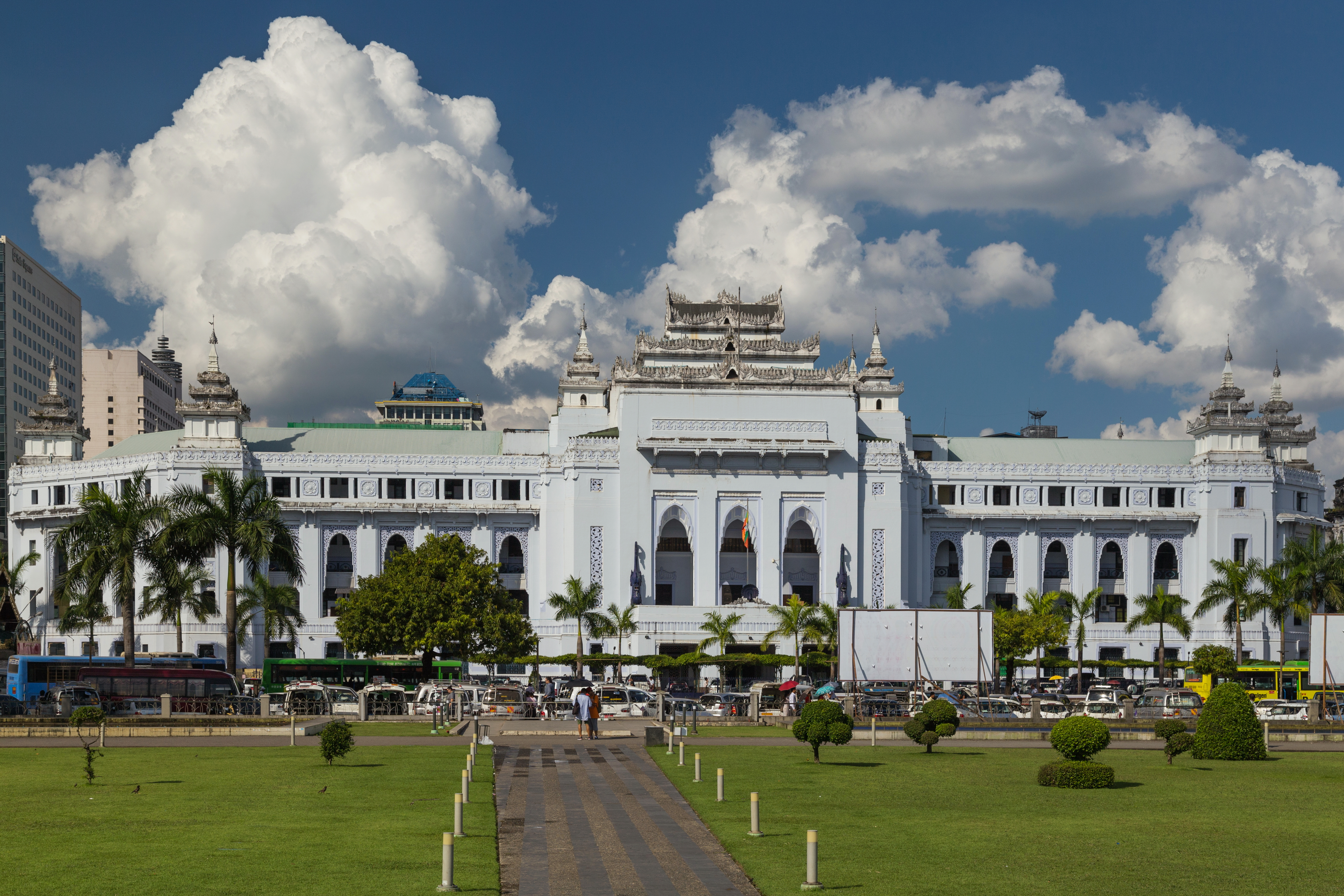
The Secretariat (Ministers' Building), Government House and Yangon City Hall (Ripton Hall) in Yangon are examples of colonial architecture in Myanmar.

Burma was part of the British Empire by the end of the 1880s, and this ushered in a period of colonial architecture. Rangoon, now known as Yangon, became a multi-ethnic capital. As large, colonial buildings were built throughout the city, social disruption in Burma spawned nationalist rallies and anti-colonial protests.

Yangon's central business district, along the Yangon River, contains many colonial-era buildings. One example is the Ministers' Building, built as the Secretariat Building in 1902 to house the British administration. Other downtown structures are the Bogyoke Market (formerly Scott Market) and the Strand Hotel, built in 1896 by Aviet and Tigran Sarkie. Prominent buildings include Yangon City Hall, built between 1926 and 1936; the Customs House; the High Court Building (built in 1914 and converted to the High Court head office in 1962); the 1920 Inland Water Transport Authority Building, and the former Myanmar Railways headquarters.

Towards the end of the colonial period, a more syncretic style developed. Yangon City Hall is one of the better known examples of this syncretic Burmese architecture. It features traditional tiered roofs called pyatthat, and was designed by Burmese architect U Tin, who also designed Central Railway Station.

=== Modernist era ===
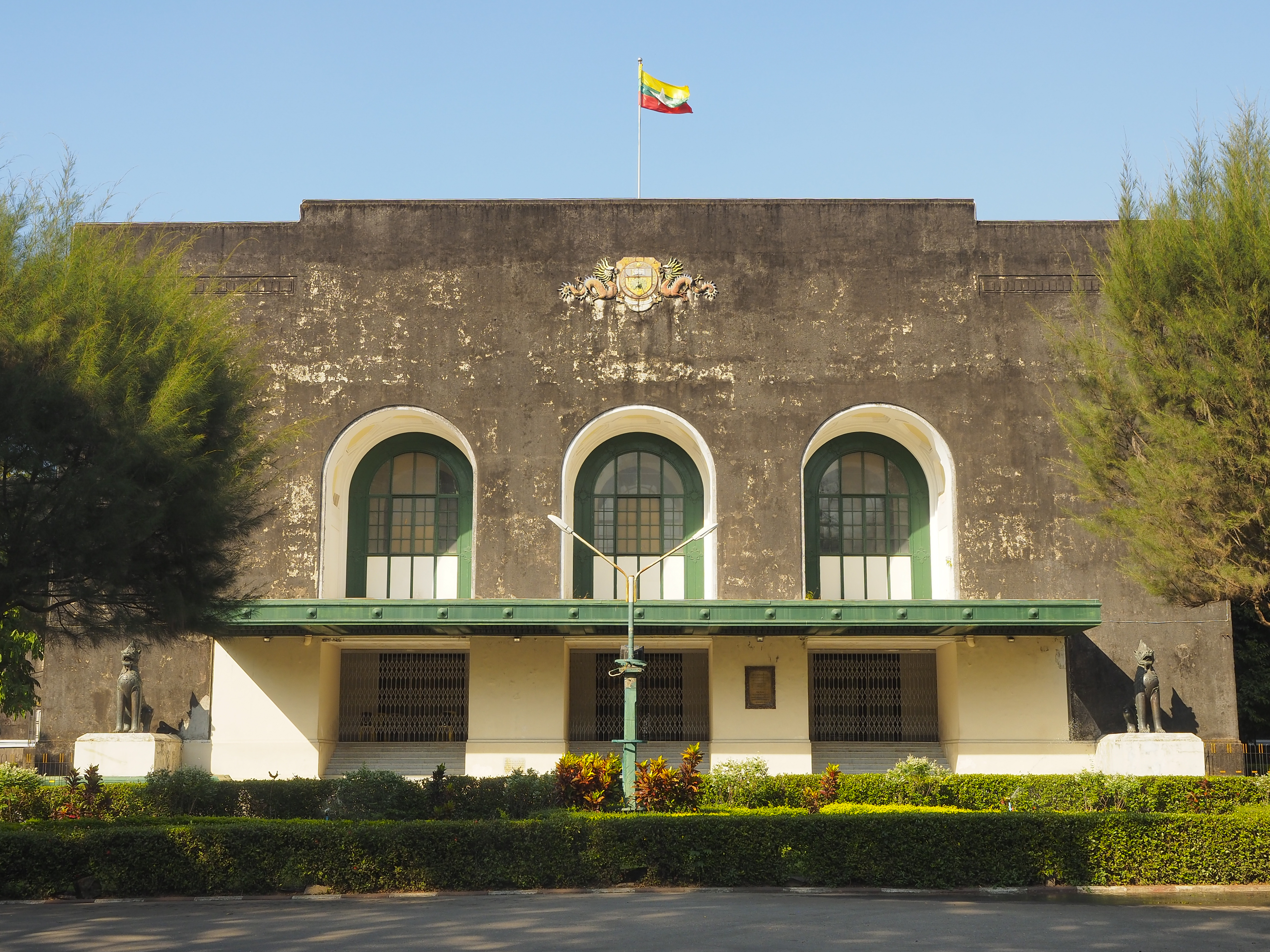
Convocation Hall, brutalist style in the University of Yangon

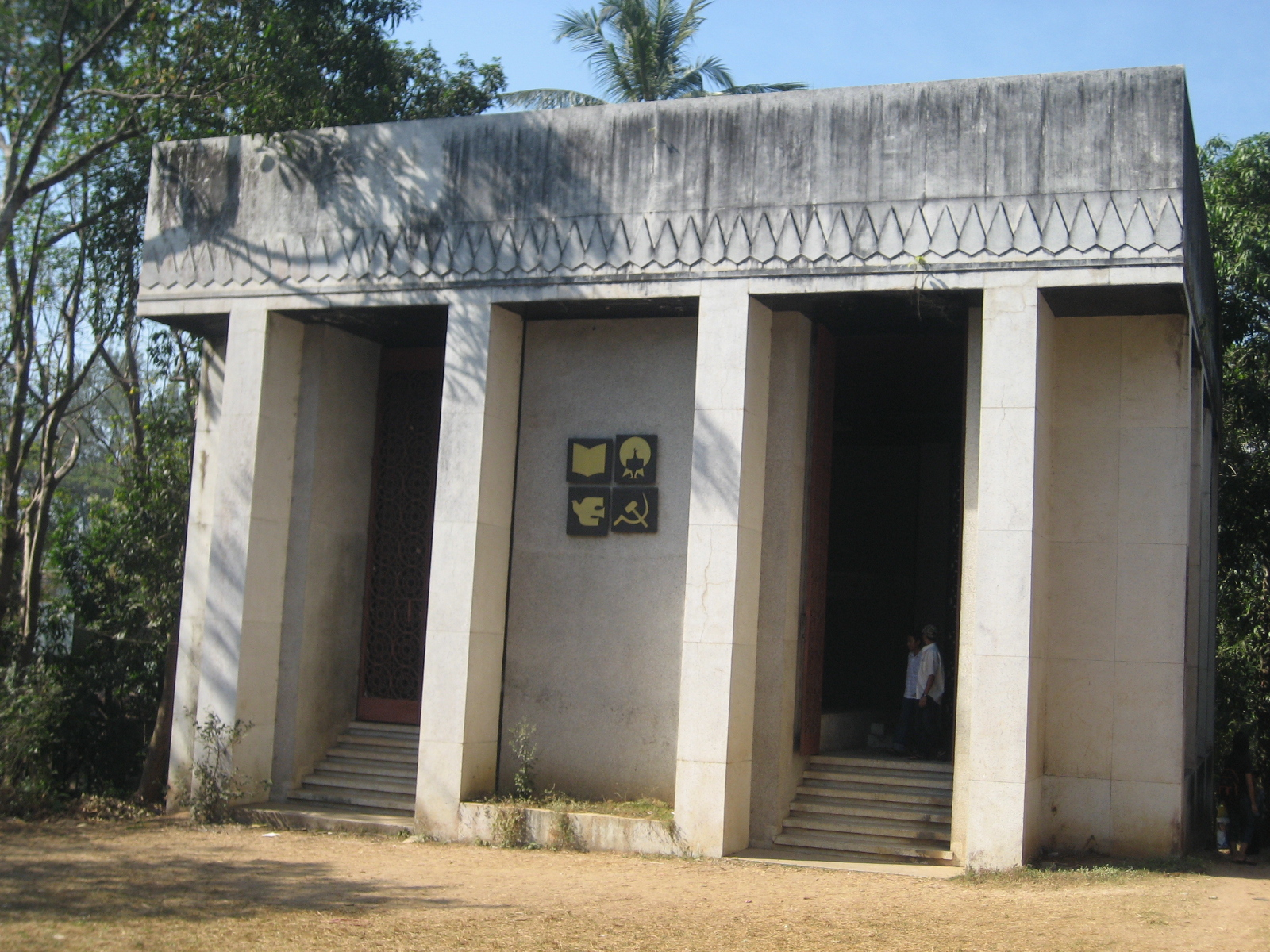
Mausoleum of Thakin Kodaw Hmaing, with art deco decorations

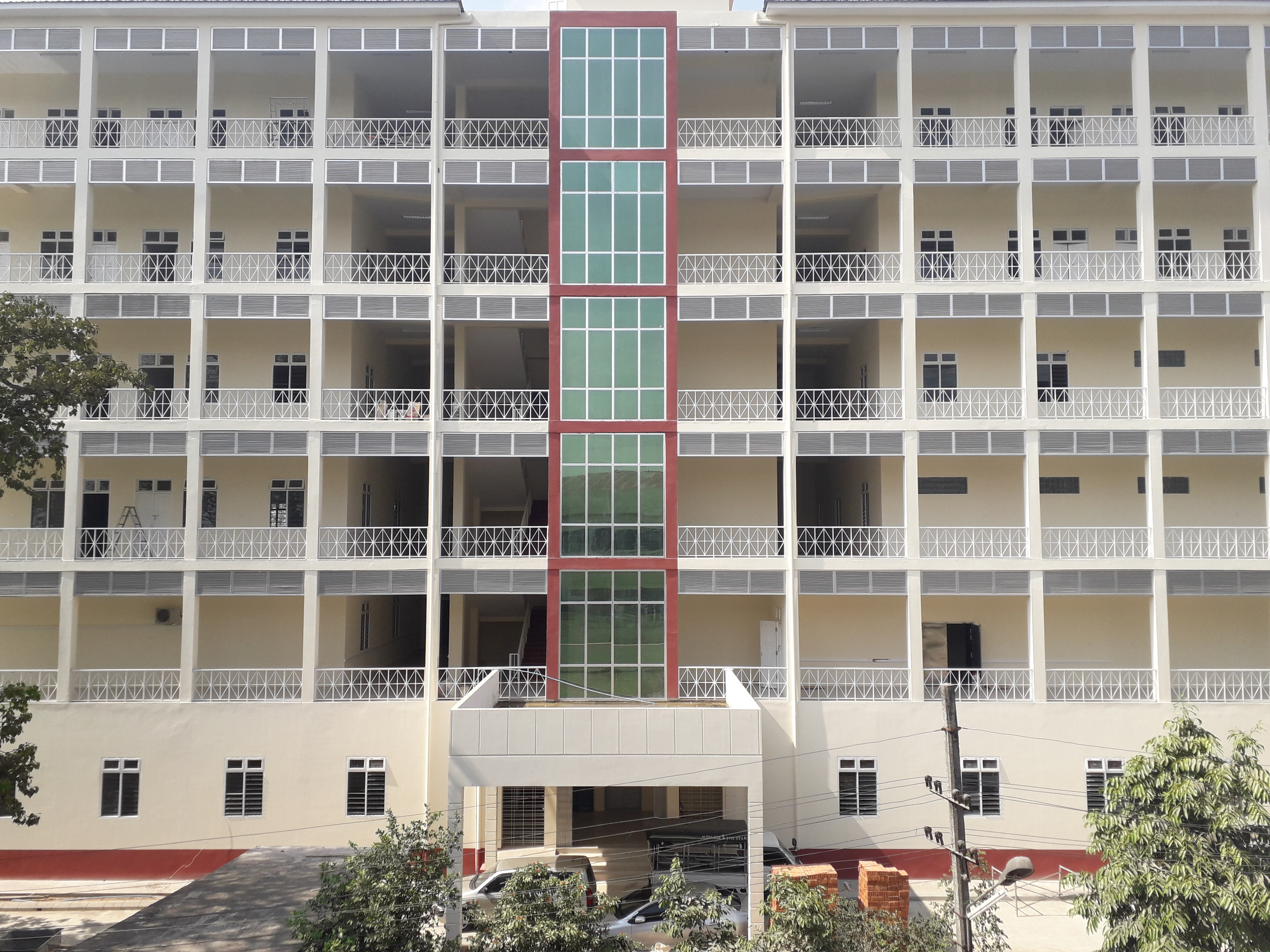
Insein General Hospital, current style completed in 1991

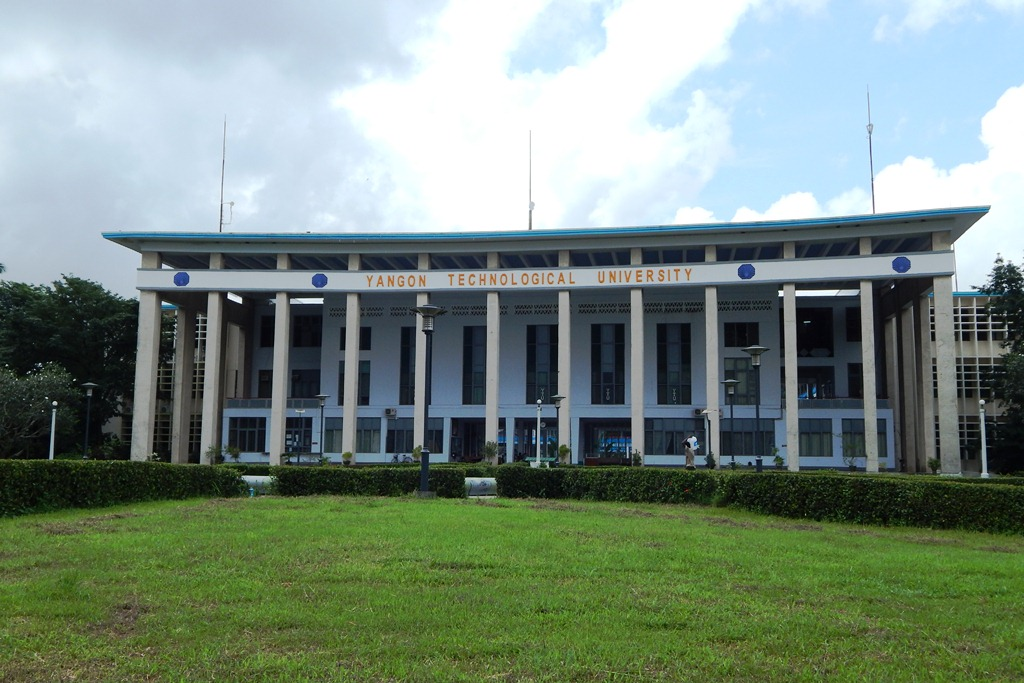
Yangon Technological University, completed in 1999

Following Burma's independence in 1948, various architects created a new style with the attitude of the modern and independent nation. In the 1950s, the American architect Benjamin Polk designed the Pitakataik (also known as the Buddhist Tripitaka Library) for the University of Yangon featuring the brutalist bare concrete style due to shortages of other construction materials. In the 1960s, the Burmese architect U Kyaw Min designed the mausoleum for independence hero and poet Thakin Kodaw Hmaing, featuring art deco decorations with the brutalist style. Soviet architects Kaleriya Kislova and Viktor Andreyev designed the Inya Lake Hotel in the Soviet style of rest and relaxation, using the shape of a submarine for the hotel. This more modernist style of repeating units was also used earlier in 1958 for the Yangon Children's Hospital by Burmese architect U Tun Than.

== Notable structures ==
=== Shwedagon Pagoda ===
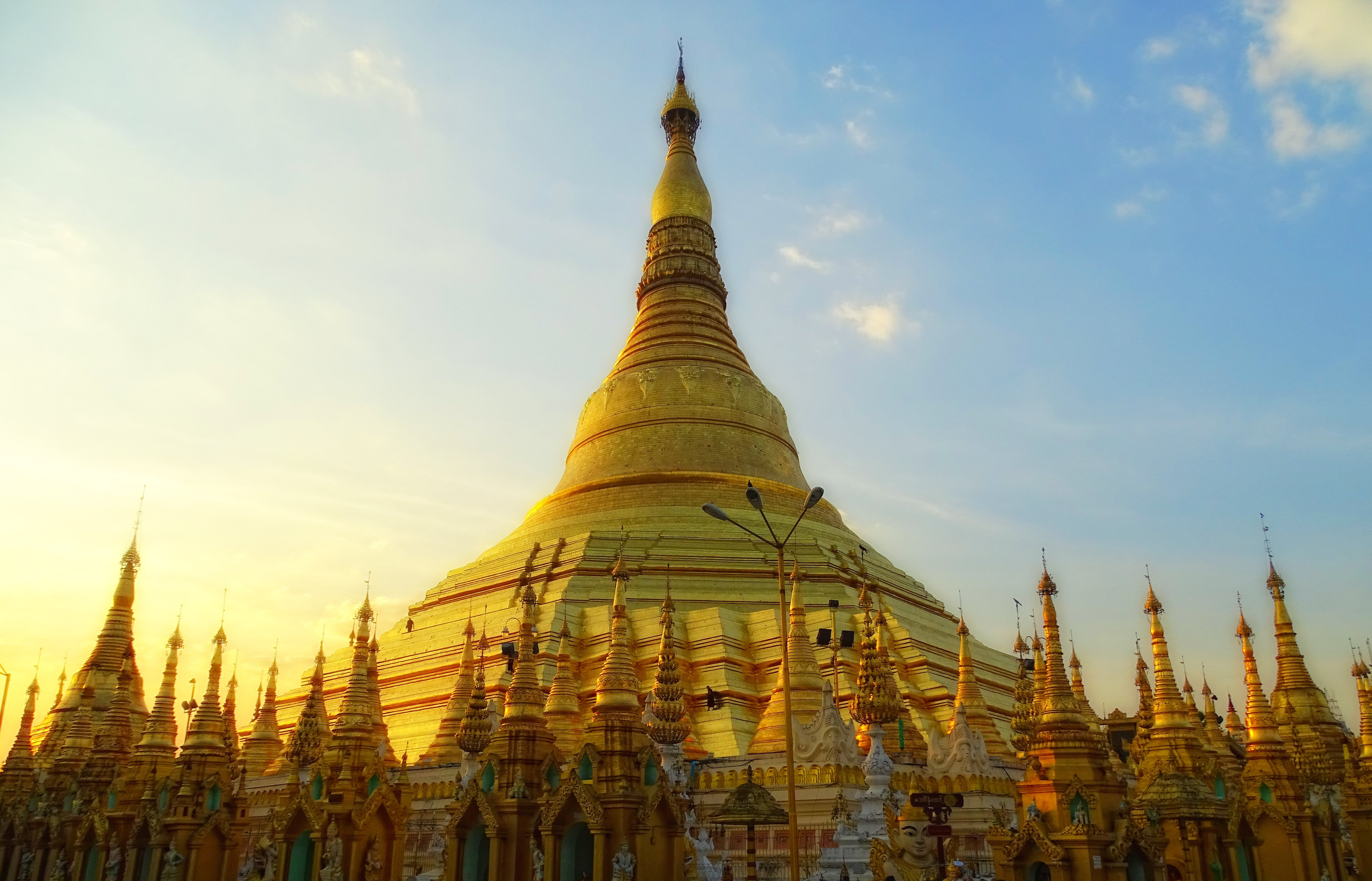
The Shwedagon Pagoda in Yangon

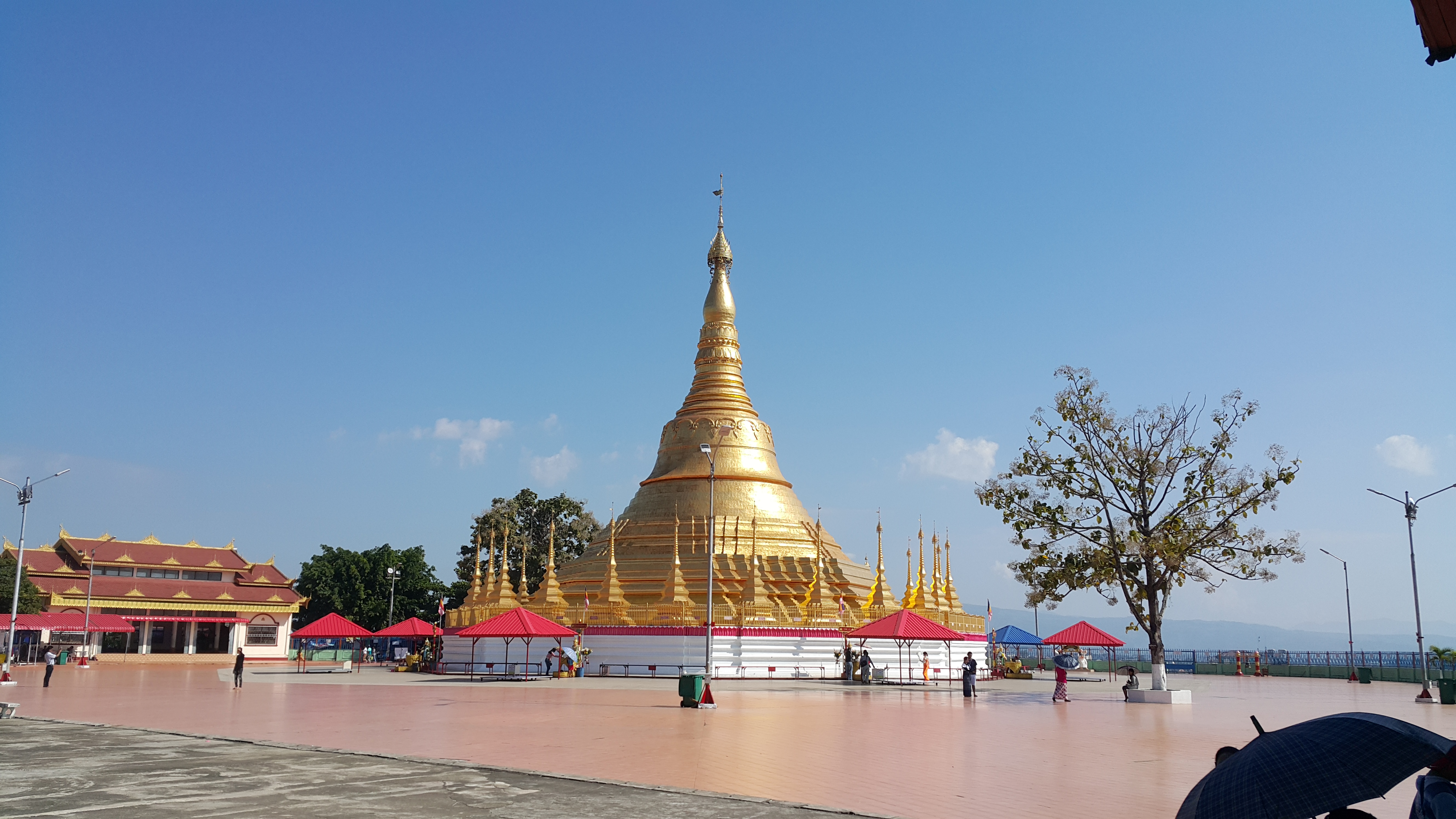
The replica of Shwedagon pagoda in Tachileik, Myanmar

The Shwedagon Pagoda in Yangon is a stupa and a focal point of Buddhism in Myanmar. At 99.4 metres (326 ft) high, the stupa is covered with gold leaf and plate. It is surrounded by smaller shrines, and is topped with a gem-encrusted seinbu (diamond bud) and a seven-tiered hti representing Burmese spirituality. Every four or five years, its gold is repaired or replaced. The stupa, built by a Theravada Buddhist society, is said to contain strands of the Buddha's hair.

Built to be walked around, visitors pass astrological representations of the eight days of a Burmese week. The platform includes devotional centres at the cardinal compass points and dozens of smaller stupas, including the Golden Elder. Bodhi trees, images of the Buddha and other spiritual figures, and the 16-ton Singu Min Bell (formerly known as the Maha Ganda Bell) decorate the exterior.

The pagoda has been a centre of Buddhist devotion and a forum for political activism. During the anti-colonial demonstrations of the nationalist Thakin Party in 1938 and 1939, "strike centres" were set up around the pagoda. In 1988, as the Burmese Socialist Programme Party was collapsing, Shwedagon was a platform for pro-democracy political demonstrations. On 26 August 1988, Aung San Suu Kyi spoke before a large audience about democracy at the pagoda's west gate.

=== Mandalay Palace ===
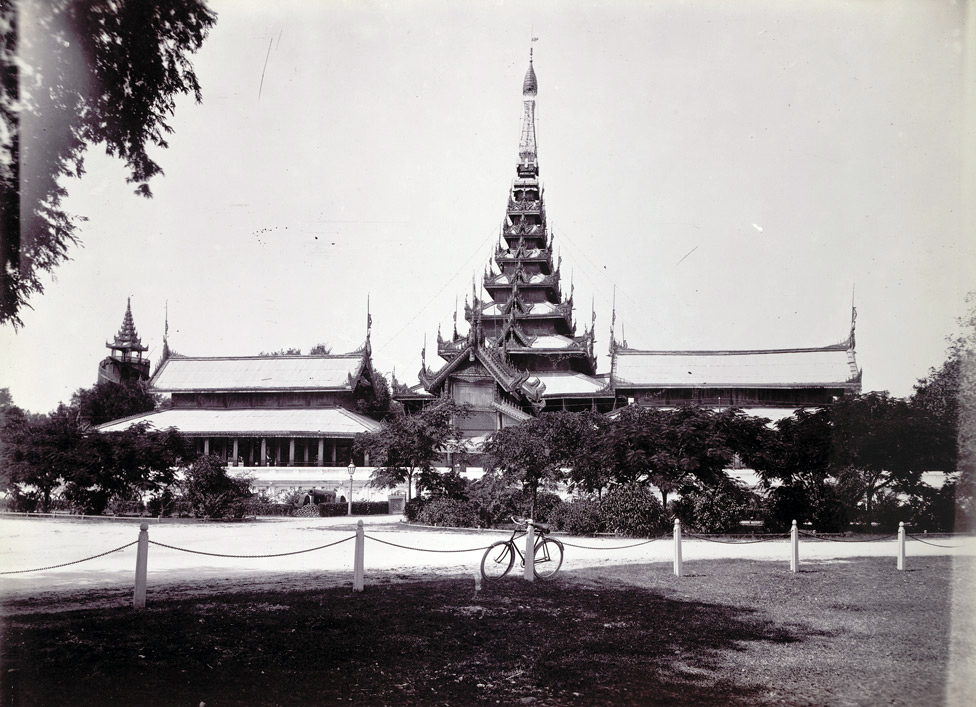
Great Audience Hall, Mandalay Palace, 1903

The Mandalay Palace is an example of wooden architecture in Myanmar, which emphasizes exterior aesthetics rather than interior space. The Mandalay Palace was constructed as part of Mindon Min's founding of Mandalay between 1857 and 1859. Large parts of the palace were reconstructed from the palace at Amarapura, which was relocated to the new city. The master plan called for a 144-square block grid patterned city, anchored by a 16 square block royal palace compound at the centre by Mandalay Hill. The 413-hectare royal palace compound was surrounded by four 2 km (6666 ft) long walls and a moat 64 m (210 ft) wide, 4.5 m (15 ft) deep. Along the wall were bastions with gold-tipped spires at intervals of 169 m (555 ft). The walls had three gates on each side, twelve in total, each presenting a zodiac sign. The citadel had five bridges to cross the moat. Some characteristics of the palace (such as cardinally placed gates and a central palace structure) can be traced back to the early Pyu period. The primary east–west axis was created from the palace buildings themselves. Illustrations from 11th century Pagan depict wooden buildings similar to those at the palace, and handiwork later found at Mandalay.

Only a section of the original palace remained after a 1945 fire, with examples of traditional stucco used in Burmese construction. The palace's Flower Distribution Centre contains several wooden, semicircular arches which may have been inspired by 19th-century European buildings. The stucco on these arches appears to represent rays of sunlight or lotus petals.

In addition to its wood carvings and stucco, tiered roofs (pyatthat) are a feature of the palace. Inside, covered hallways lead to a small throne room which is topped by a pyatthat. Many pyatthats on the palace, like those other Burmese structures, are parallel to monasteries and throne rooms. There is also a pyatthat over the Great Audience Hall. Due to the tropical climate, frequent renovations of the wood-and stucco palace have been necessary; some of its original teak has been reinforced with concrete.

== Features ==
=== Stucco and wood carving ===
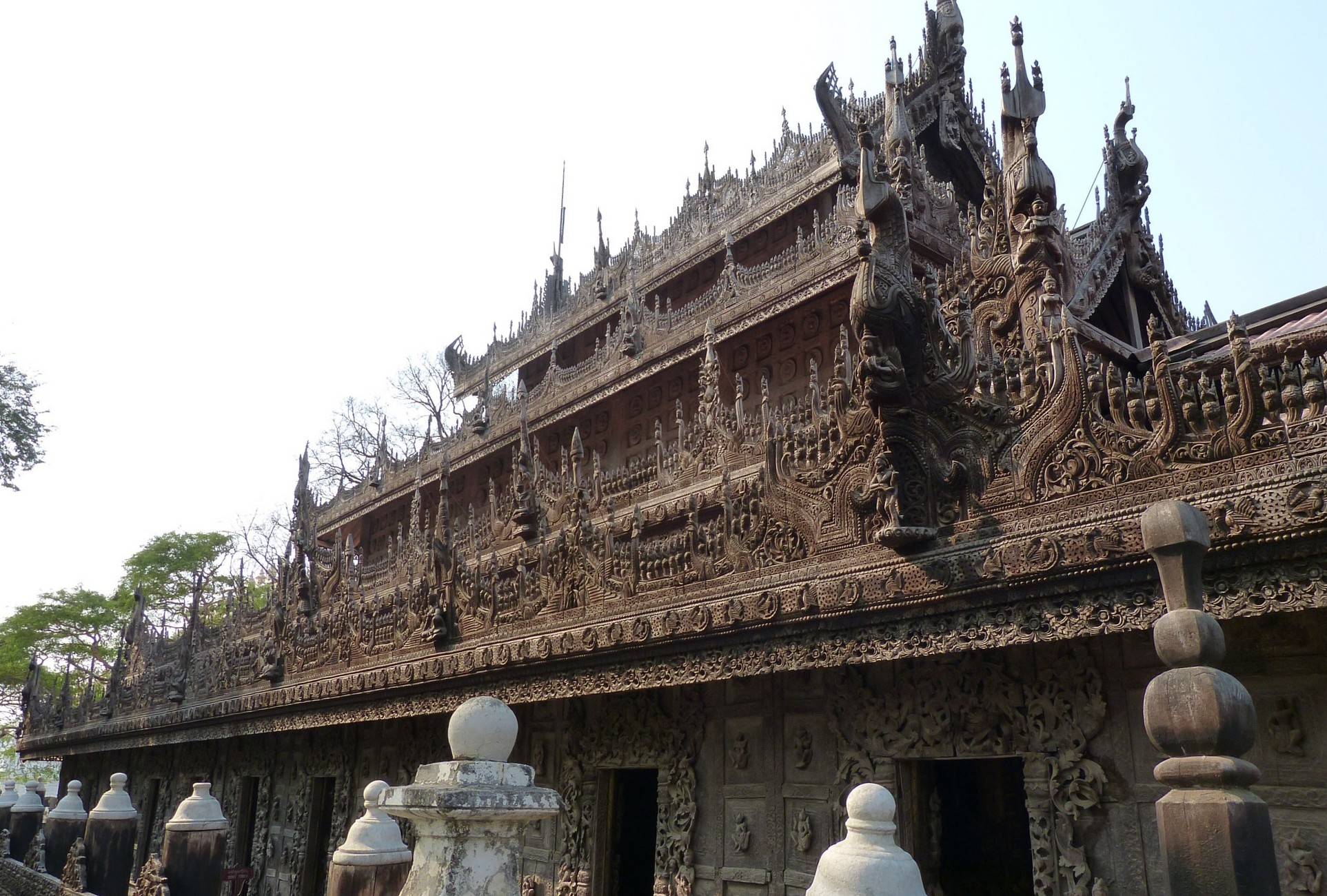
Teak carvings of the Shwenandaw Monastery

Stucco, introduced during the Bagan period, is strongly tied to Mon heritage. Wood carving in Myanmar is a traditional art which has survived for centuries. Due to its tropical climate (necessitating the reconstruction of many buildings), the craft has been passed down from generation to generation. Without these renovations, the art of wood carving would have been lost and it would have been impossible to reconstruct traditional features.

=== Use of gold ===
Gold cladding is a feature of traditional Burmese architecture, usually prominent in gilded or gold-plated exteriors. The Bupaya, Shwedagon, Shwezigon and Lawkananda Pagodas have gold features.

== Threats ==
During World War II, many historical structures were lost or damaged; much of the Mandalay Palace was destroyed in a fire near the end of the war. In 1962, on alleged orders from Ne Win, the Rangoon University Students' Union was demolished (although the main campus still contains lecture and residence halls from the colonial period). Since the late 1980s, many colonial structures (including a block of cinemas) have been razed for new construction.

== Preservation and reconstruction ==
Only a few colonial-era buildings and about 2,200 temples and pagodas remain in Myanmar. As a result of these losses, many groups have united to preserve the remaining structures.

The Yangon City Development Committee, established in 1990, has worked with the State Peace and Development Council to recondition many Buddhist monuments with plans for newer and more-challenging designs. Pagodas and temples have been renovated to promote "monumental Buddhism", the renewal of Buddhist architecture for a sense of authenticity. These newer Buddhist sites, a combination of modern and traditional Burmese style, are found throughout Myanmar and include monasteries, pagodas and the International Theravada Buddhist Missionary University. The crown umbrella atop the Shwedagon Pagoda, which was donated by King Mindon in 1871, was replaced in the spring of 1999.

The Yangon Heritage Trust, formed in 2012, is a non-governmental organization committed to preserving Yangon's historic architecture. The trust has had several preservation successes, due to its public-awareness campaigns. Agreements with government officials have saved the former Indian and U.S. Embassy buildings and Gandhi Hall.
