= List of Pagodas in Bagan =

Bagan (Burmese: ပုဂံ, MLCTS: pu.gam, IPA: [bəɡàɰ̃]; formerly Pagan) is an ancient city and a UNESCO World Heritage Site in Myanmar. During the 11th and 13th centuries, more than 10,000 Buddhist temples, pagodas and monasteries were constructed in Bagan, mainly lying in the Bagan Archaeological Zone. The following is a list of those pagodas and temples.

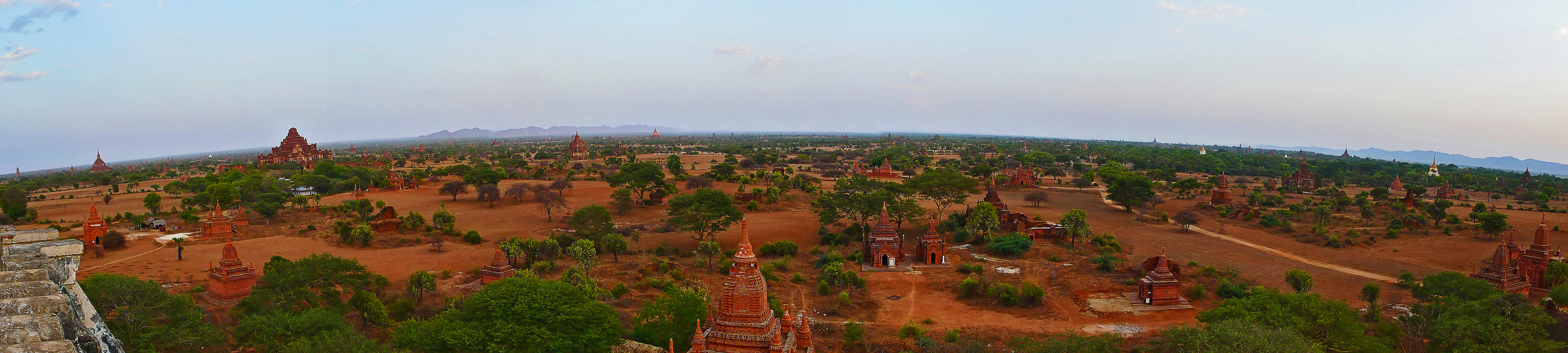
Bagan Plains with the Dhammayangyi on the left

== List ==
| Name | Photos | Year built | References |
|---|---|---|---|
| Ananda Temple (အာနန္ဒာစေတီ) | width | 1105 | |
| Dhammayangyi Temple | width | 1167-1170 | |
| Bupaya Pagoda | width | | |
| Lawkananda Pagoda (လောကနန္ဒာစေတီ) | width | | |
| Mi-nyein-gon Pagoda | | | |
| Shwezigon Pagoda | width | | |
| Alodawpyi Pagoda | width | | |
| Htilominlo Temple | width | | |
| Gadawpalin Temple | width | | |
| Shwesantaw Payar | width | | |
| Lokahteikpan Temple | width | | |
| Myazedi Pagoda | width | | |
| Manuha Temple | width | | |
| Nanpaya Temple | width | | |
| Pyathadagyi Pagoda | width | | |
| Thakyamuni | | | |
| Shinthalyung | width | | |
| Gubyaukgyi Temple (Myinkaba) | width | 1113 | |
| Sulamani Temple | width | | |
| Payathonzu Temple | width | | |
| Thanbula Payar | | | |
| Tayokpye Pagoda | | | |
| Abeyadana Temple | width | | |
| Dhammayazika Pagoda | width | 1196 | |
| Mahabodhi Temple | width | 1225 | |
| Gadawpalin Temple | width | 1227 | |
| Htilominlo Temple | width | 1211 | |
| Mingalazedi Pagoda | width | 1284 | |
| Nathlaung Kyaung Temple | width | | |
| Shwegugyi Temple | width | 1331 | |
| Shwesandaw Pagoda | | | |
| Shwezigon Pagoda | width | 1060 | |
| Sulamani Temple | width | 1183 | |
| Thatbyinnyu Temple | width | 1115 | |
| Tuywindaung Pagoda | width | | |
