= Nathlaung Kyaung Temple =

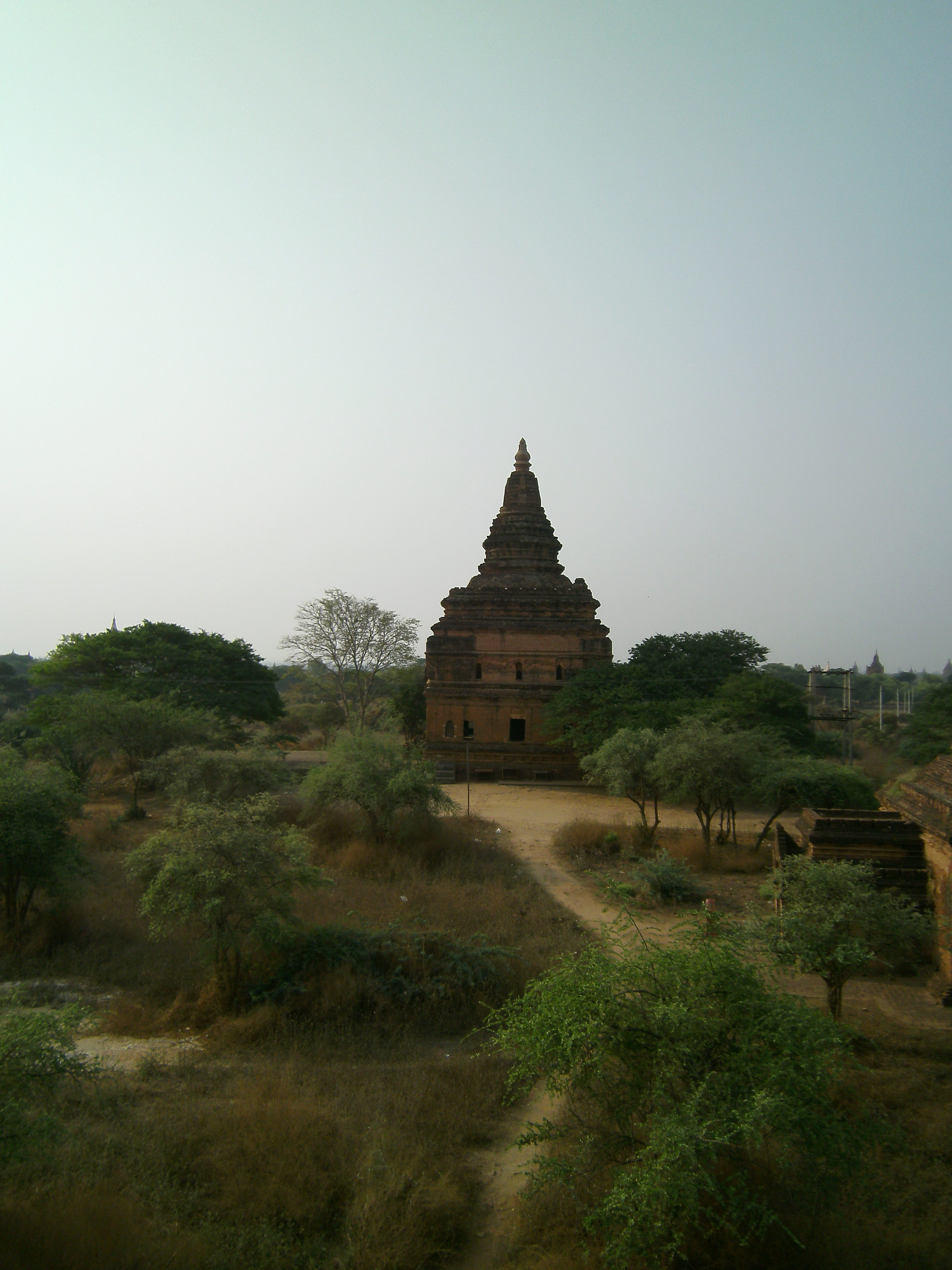
- Nathlaung Kyaung Hindu Temple. Archaeological evidence suggests the temple complex once had a much larger structure and galleries, but now only the core square temple remains.

- Location within Myanmar

Religion
- Affiliation: Hinduism
- Deity: Vishnu

Location
- Location: Bagan
- State: Mandalay Region
- Country: Burma
- Coordinates: 21.168965°N 94.862738°E

Architecture
- Established: 10th-11th century

Nathlaung Kyaung Temple (Burmese: နတ်လှောင်ကျောင်း [naʔl̥àʊɰ̃ tɕáʊɰ̃]); (lit. 'shrine confining the spirits') is a Hindu temple located within the ancient city walls of Bagan, Myanmar. It is dedicated to the Hindu god Vishnu and is the only remaining Hindu temple in the Bagan archaeological zone.

The temple is situated to the west of the Thatbyinnyu Temple, and is believed to have been built either during the reign of King Anawrahta in the 11th century or possibly in the 10th century, during the reign of King Nyaung-u Sawrahan (also known as Taungthugyi). The temple likely served the religious needs of Hindu merchants and Brahmins who had settled in Bagan and were in the service of the Burmese kings.

Another name associated with the temple is Natokya Kyaung, which lies west of Sabbanyu Longgu and east of Phutho Thana Cave Pagoda. Similar Brahmanical temples dedicated to Vishnu are said to have existed elsewhere in the region, including at Myekapa, where a Tamil inscription records the donation of a pavilion (mandapa), a door lamp, and 19 metal objects by a South Indian donor, believed to be a Malayan man from southern India. This inscription confirms the active presence of the Vishnu sect in Pagan-era Myanmar. The rituals associated with Vishnu worship, such as coronation rites involving offerings of sugarcane, feathers, sedges, peacock feathers, and lamps, were also adopted by the Buddhist kings of Bagan for royal ceremonies such as the Thingyan water festival and royal anointings.

== Architecture and Iconography ==
Nathlaung Kyaung Temple was built in a square layout with steep-rising terraces, a hallmark of early Bagan architecture. Its design is thought to have influenced later Buddhist structures in the region. Indian artisans were likely involved in its construction, contributing to its distinctly Hindu architectural elements.

Today, much of the structure has deteriorated due to age and earthquake damage. The outer mandapa and entrance are no longer extant. Only the central hall and upper superstructure remain. Statues depicting the incarnations of Vishnu can still be found in niches and porches, including:

- Matsya (fish)
- Kurma (tortoise)
- Varaha (boar)
- Narasimha (man-lion)

These depictions symbolize Vishnu's role in preserving cosmic order by taking various forms (human and animal) to save humanity in times of crisis.

Inside the inner sanctum is a corridor that leads to the central hall. Arched niches surrounding the hall contain:

- A seated statue of Shiva in Padmasana (lotus posture)
- Standing images of Vishnu holding a scythe (skull), conch shell (shankha), mace (gada), and other iconographic symbols
- A partially preserved sculpture of Vishnu riding the bird Garuda

One particularly significant but fragmentary sculpture depicts the cosmic creation myth: Vishnu reclining on the serpent Shesha, floating on the ocean of eternity. From Vishnu's navel emerges a lotus from which the god Brahma is born. Although only the serpent's curled tail remains, the sculpture hints at a once-elaborate representation of the Trimurti: Vishnu, Shiva, and Brahma.

== Cultural Significance ==
According to legend, the temple was built to contain all the local spirits (nat) so that Buddhism could be established and practiced peacefully in the Bagan Kingdom. This blending of indigenous nat worship with Brahmanical and Buddhist traditions reflects the syncretic religious atmosphere of Pagan-era Myanmar.

== Gallery ==
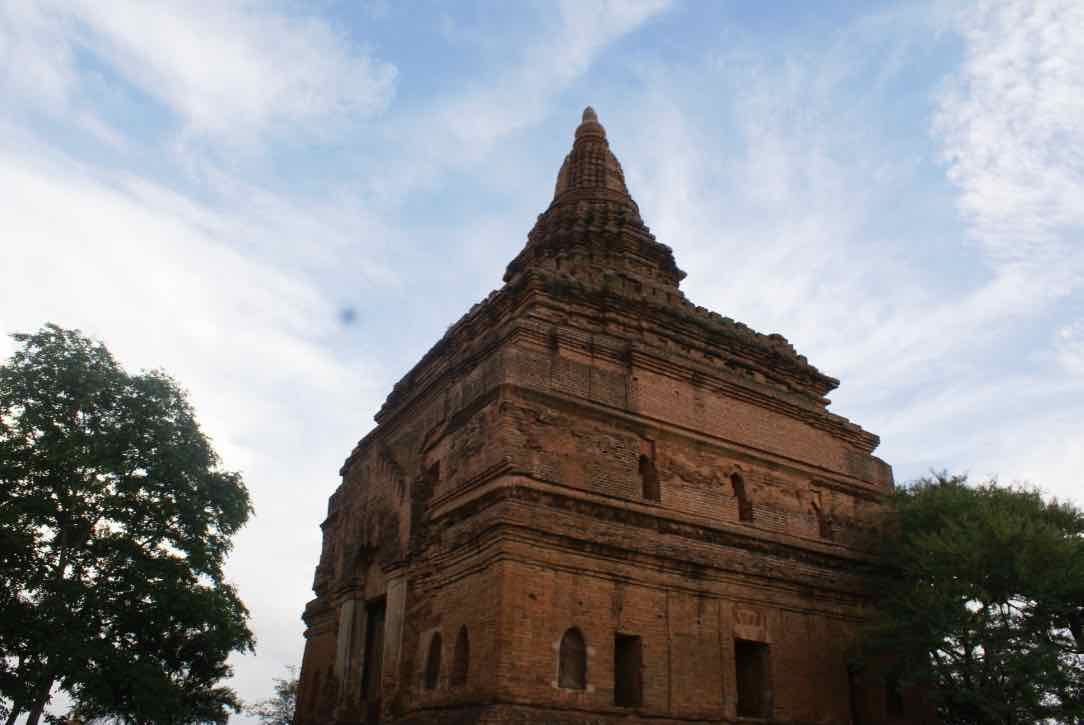
Nathlaung Kyaung Temple

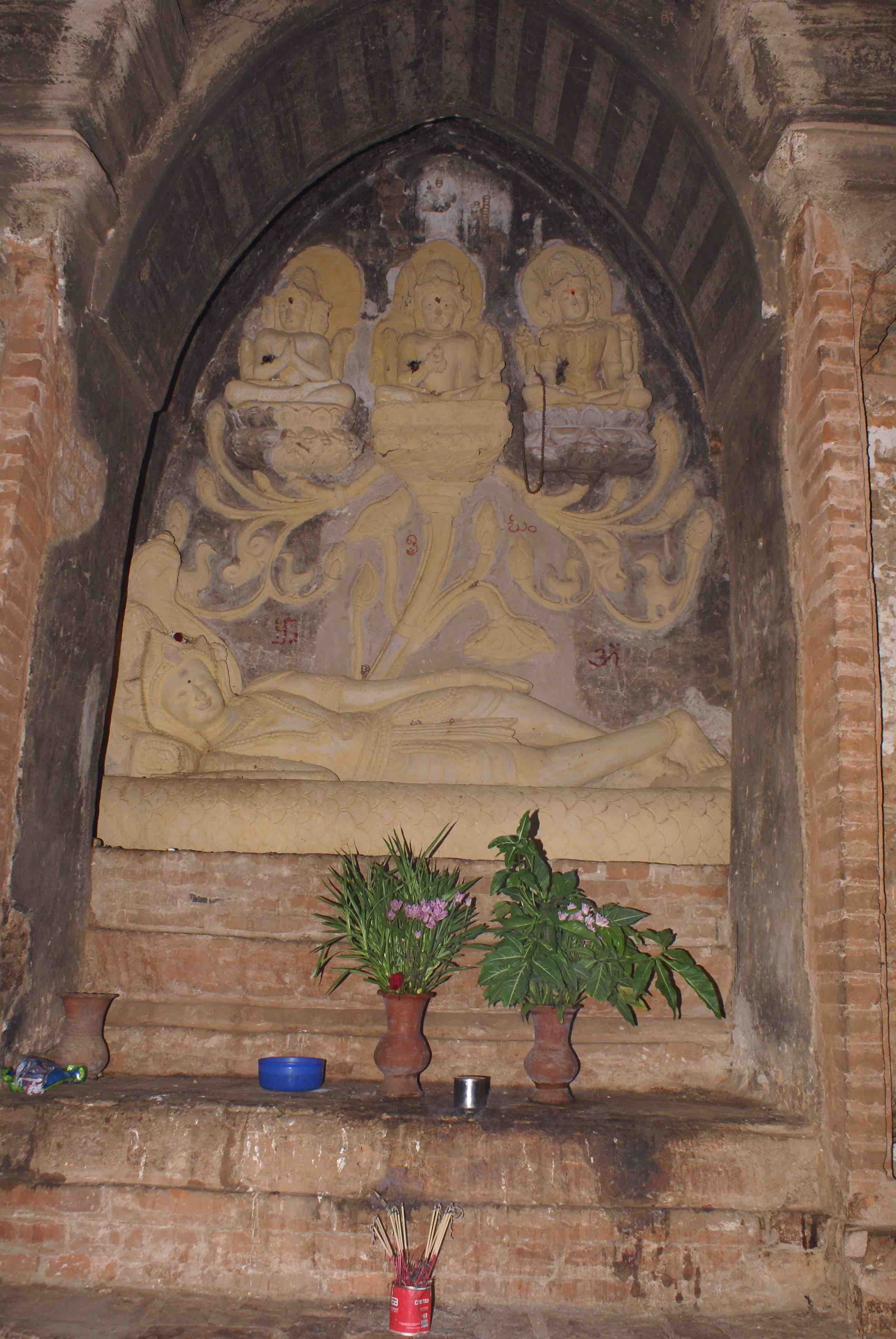
Images of Hindu Gods at the entrance

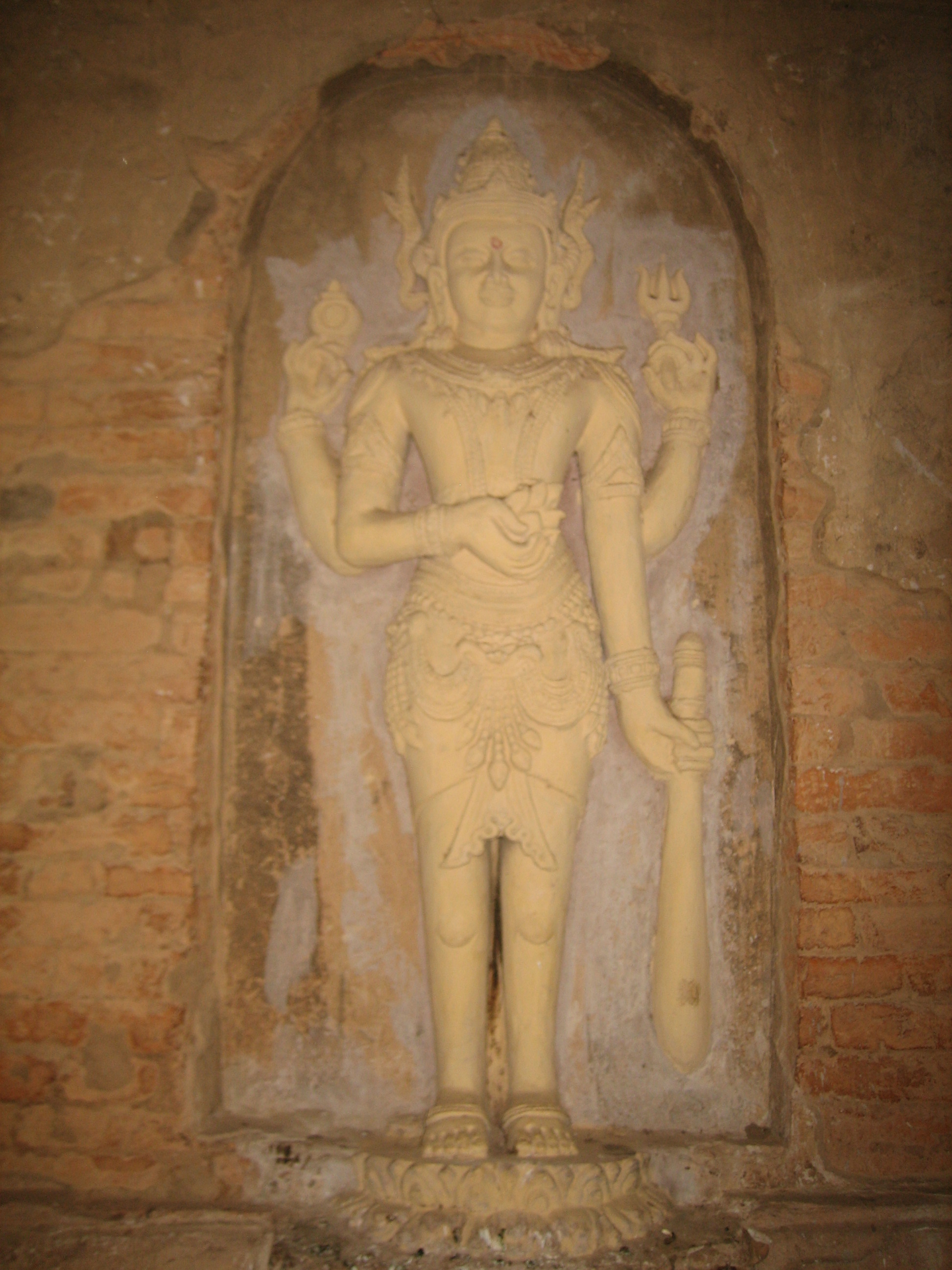
One of seven Vishnu statues in the Nat-Hlaung Kyaung temple, Bagan, Myanmar. Originally there were 10 idols dedicated to Vishnu; three were removed, one is in Berlin Dahlem Museum.

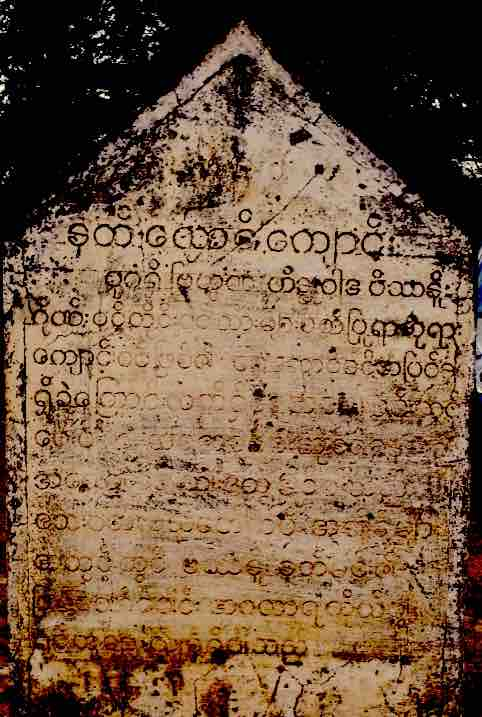
Stone Inscription at Nathlaung Kyaung Temple written in Burmese

== See also ==
- Thatbyinnyu Temple – east of Nathlaung Kyaung temple
- Ananda Temple – 0.4 miles from Nathlaung Kyaung temple
- Bupaya Pagoda – 0.6 miles from Nathlaung Kyaung temple
- Dhammayangyi Temple – 0.8 miles from Nathlaung Kyaung temple
- Hinduism in Southeast Asia
- Hindu temple
