= Gandhi Hall, Yangon =

Building in downtown Yangon, Myanmar

Coordinates: 16.7719°N 96.1640°E

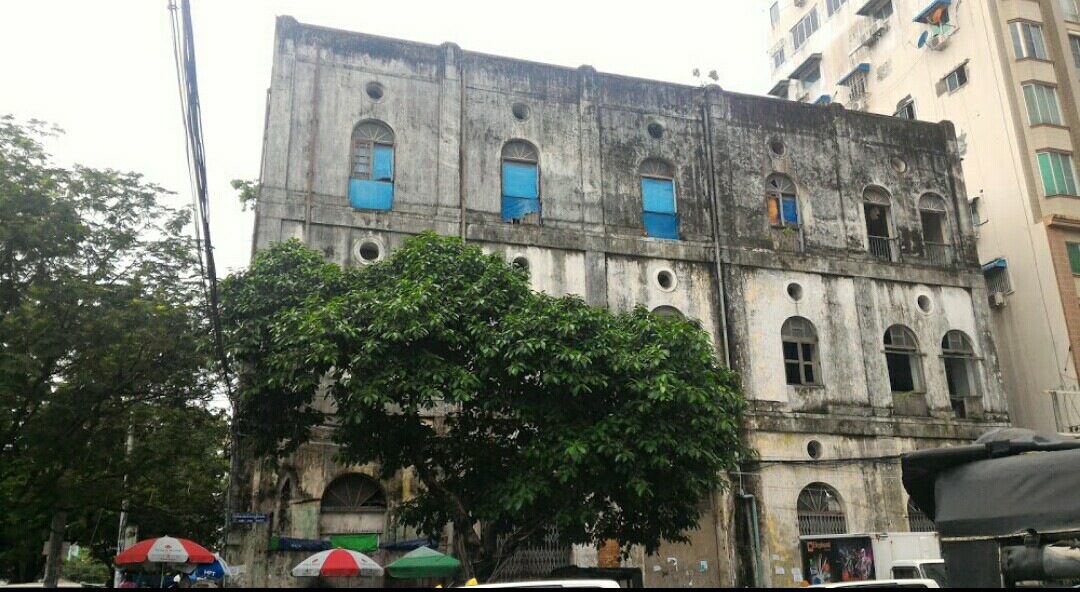
Gandhi Hall Yangon

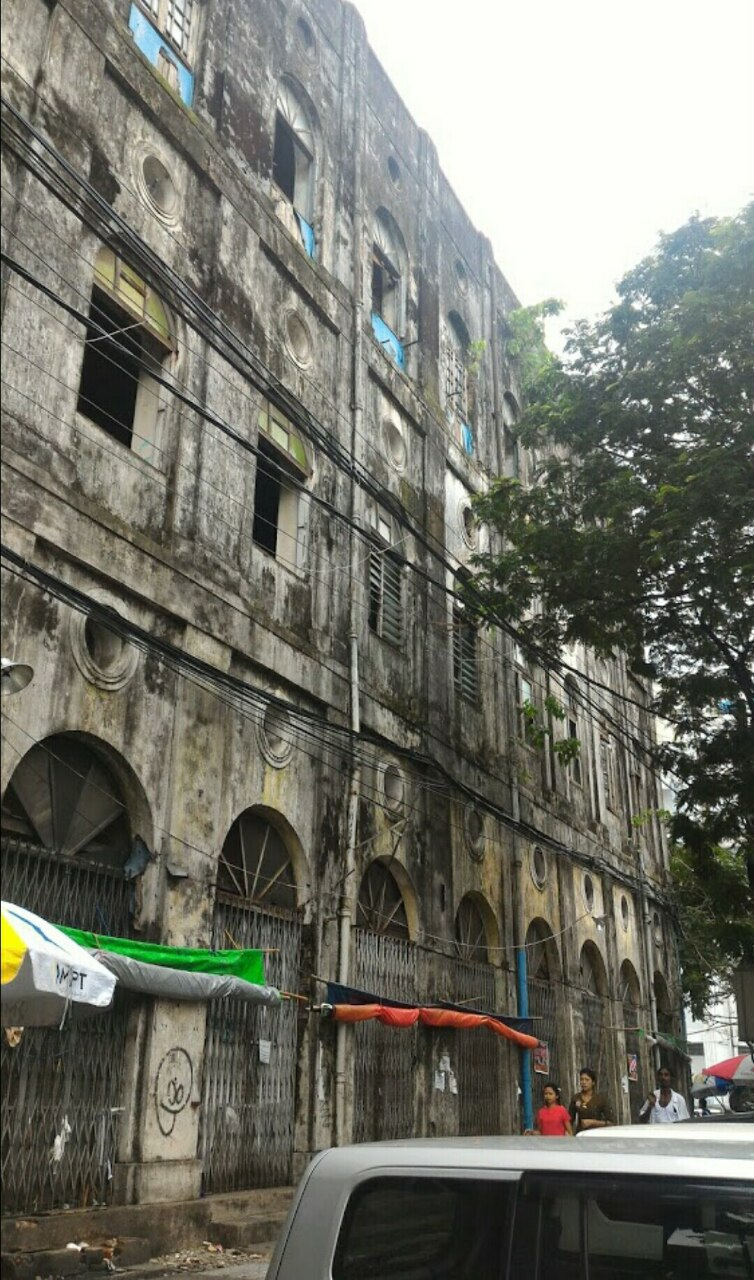
Gandhi Hall Yangon Side View

Gandhi Hall, also known as Mahatma Gandhi Memorial Trust, is a building in downtown Yangon, Myanmar, on the Merchant Street corner of Bo Aung Kyaw Road. It was first used as the office of The Rangoon Times, one of the English-language newspapers in British Burma. Later, in 1951, it was bought by Prime Minister U Nu and Indian ambassador M. A. Rauf for the Mahatma Gandhi Memorial Trust. The building is also part of the political history of Myanmar, as it was used for a gathering of elected representatives of the 1990 Myanmar election, who issued the Gandhi Hall Declaration in July 1990.
