= Lawkananda Pagoda =

Buddhist Pagoda in Bagan, Myanmar

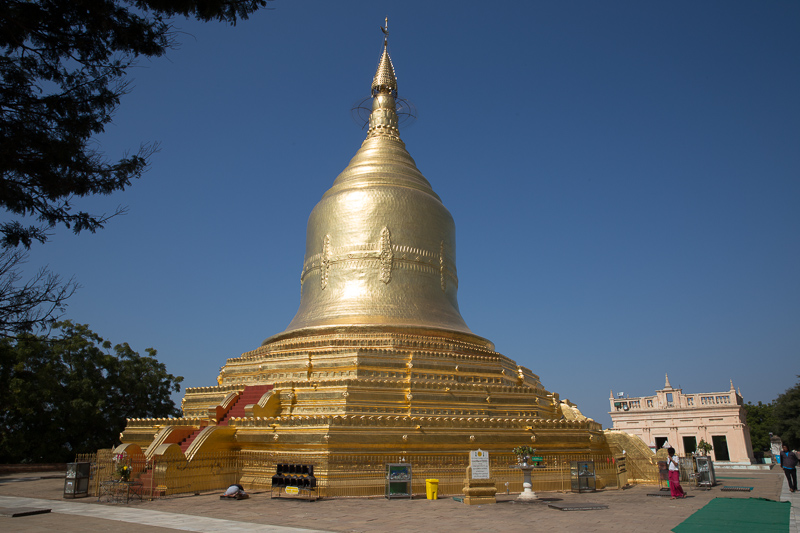

- Location within Myanmar

Religion
- Affiliation: Theravada Buddhism

Location
- Location: Bagan, Mandalay Region
- Country: Myanmar
- Coordinates: 21°7′38″N 94°51′2″E

Architecture
- Founder: King Anawrahta

Lawkananda Pagoda (Burmese: လောကနန္ဒာစေတီ; pronounced [lɔ́ka̰nàɰ̃da̰ zèdì]; also spelt Lokananda, literally "joy of the world") is a Buddhist stupa located in Bagan (formerly Pagan), Myanmar (Burma). It was erected on the bank of the Irrawaddy River during the reign of King Anawrahta. It contains a replica of a Buddha tooth relic. The Lawkananda Pagoda festival along with local food and handicrafts is celebrated in the month of July every year. Since it takes place in the rainy season, very few outside visitors are able to attend the festival. On 24 May 2003, a bejewelled umbrella (hti) was hoisted to the top of the pagoda.

== See also ==
- Cetiya
- Burmese pagoda
- Bupaya Pagoda
- Dhammayazika Pagoda
- Mingalazedi Pagoda
- Shwesandaw Pagoda (Bagan)
- Shwezigon Pagoda
- Relic of the tooth of the Buddha
