= Sulamani Temple =

Popular Buddhist temple in Bagan, Myanmar

Coordinates: 21°09′53″N 94°52′54″E

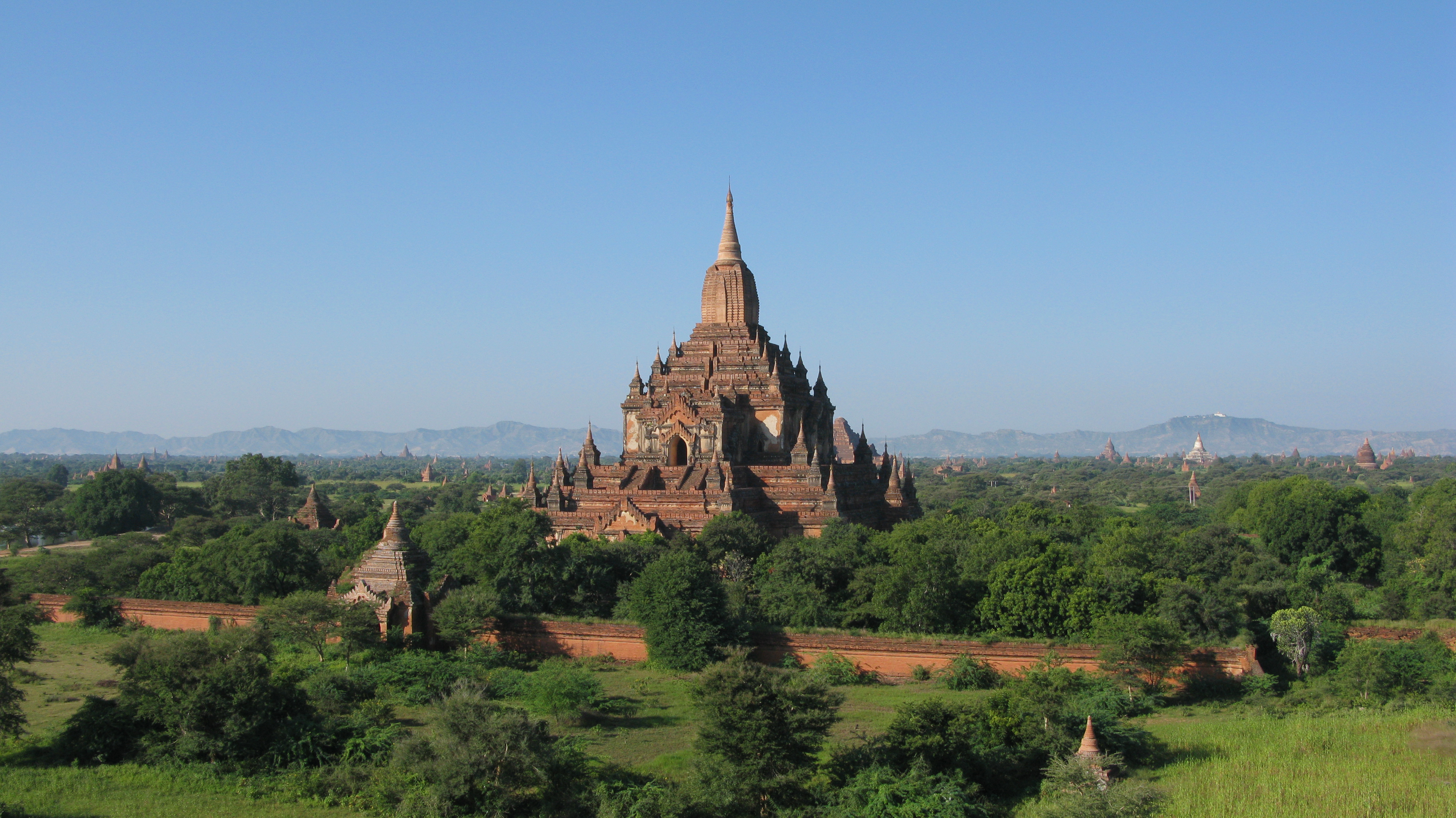
Sulamani Temple

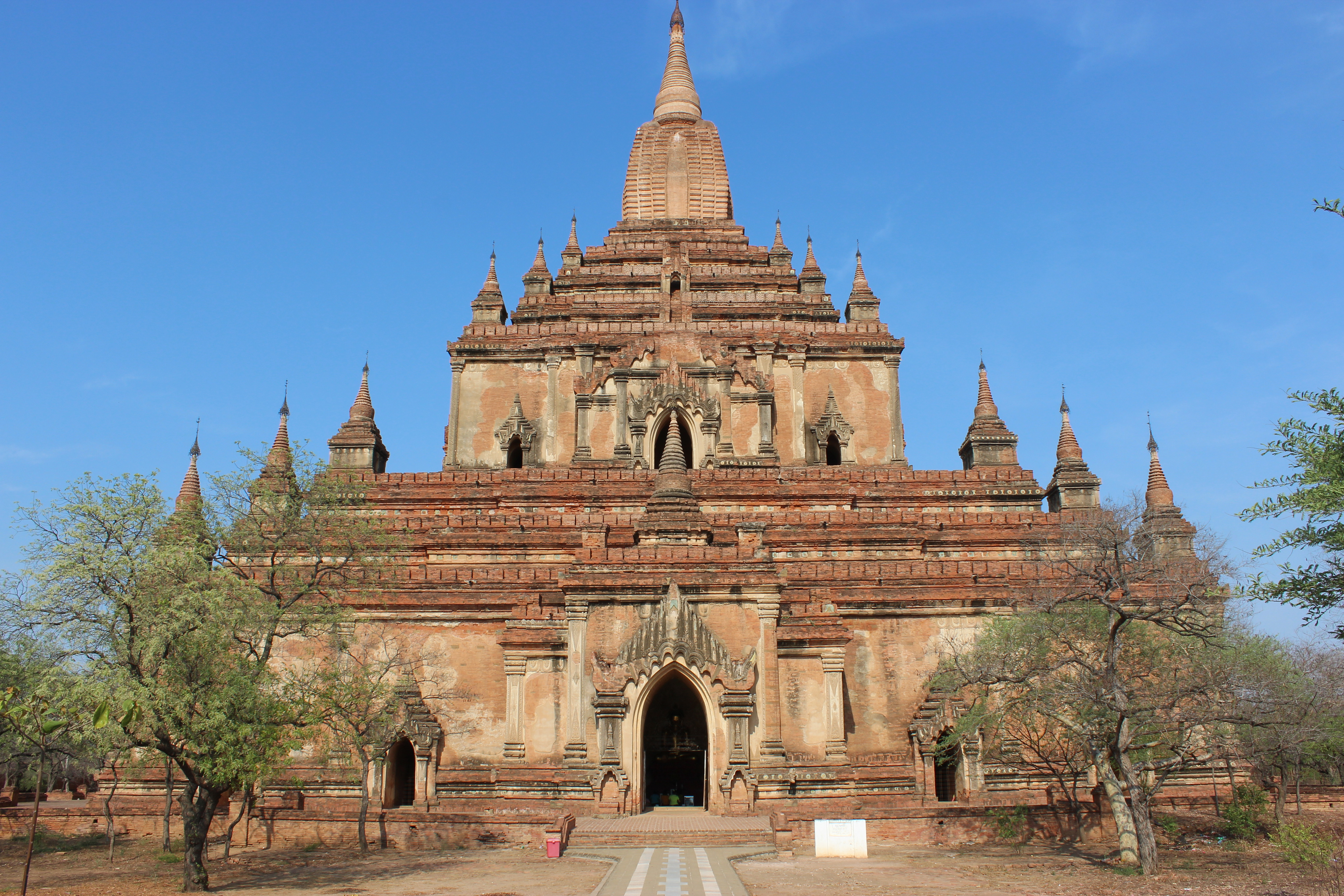
Sulamani Temple

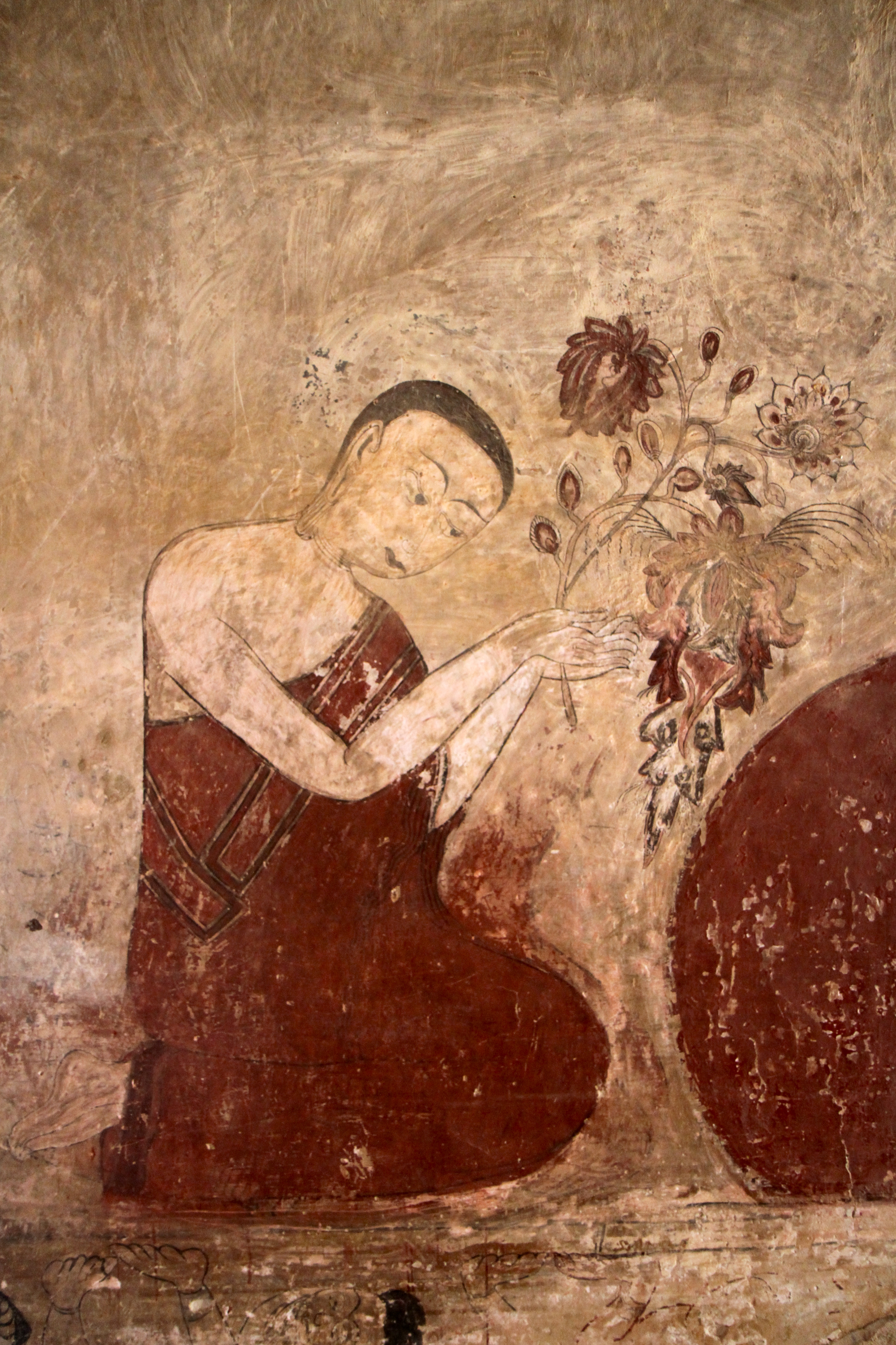
Sulamani Temple fresco detail

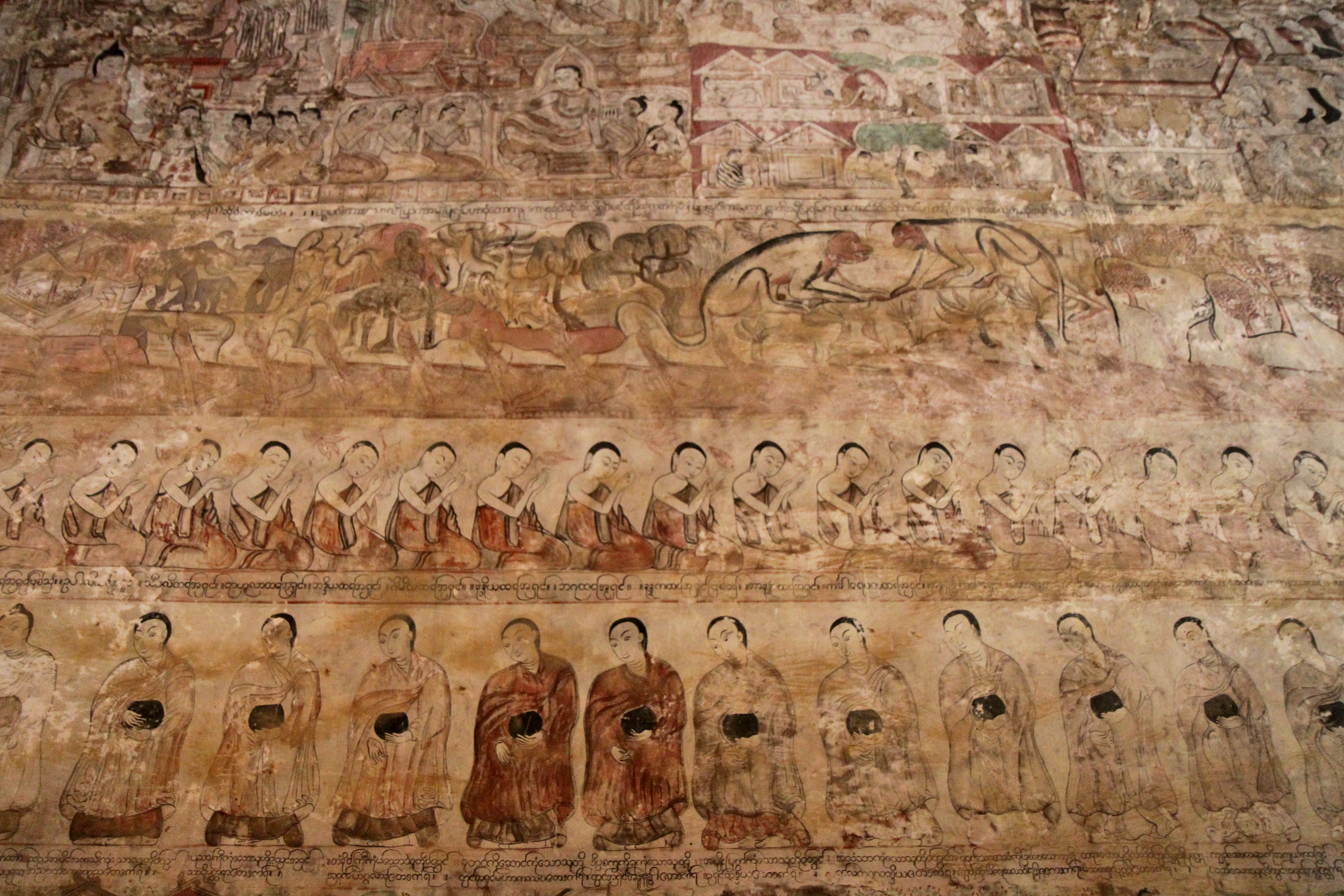
Sulamani Temple fresco

The Sulamani Temple (Burmese: စူဠာမဏိဘုရား, pronounced [sùlàmənḭ pʰəjá]) is a Buddhist temple located in the village of Minnanthu (southwest of Bagan) in Myanmar. The temple is one of the most-frequently visited in Bagan.

It was built in 1183 by King Narapatisithu, and is similar to the Thatbyinnyu Temple in design. The Sulamani Temple also shows influence from the Dhammayangyi Temple, and was the model for the Htilominlo Temple. Sulamani Temple was restored after the 1975 earthquake, and utilises brick and stone, with frescoes in the interior of the temple. It was rebuilt in 1994.

== 3D Documentation ==
The Zamani Project from the University of Cape Town, South Africa, offered its services towards the spatial documentation of monuments in Bagan in response to the destruction of monuments by an earthquake in August 2016. After reconnaissance visit to Bagan and a subsequent meeting at the UNESCO offices in Bangkok in February 2017, the Zamani Project documented the Sula-mani-gu-hpaya (Sulamani) Temple, during a field campaign in March 2017.

During two more field campaigns in 2017 and 2018, the Zamani Project spatially documented a further 11 monuments in Bagan, including Kyauk-ku-umin (154); Kubyauk-gyi (Gubyaukgyi) (298), Tha-peik-hmauk-gu-hpaya (744); Monument 1053; Sein-nyet-ama (1085); Sein-nyet-nyima (1086); Naga-yon-hpaya (1192); Loka-ok-shaung (1467); Than-daw-kya (1592); Ananda Monastery; and the City Gate of old Bagan (Tharabha Gate).

Textured 3D models, panorama tours, elevations, sections and plans of some of those structures are available on www.zamaniproject.org.
