= Bupaya Pagoda =

Buddhist Pagoda in Bagan, Myanmar

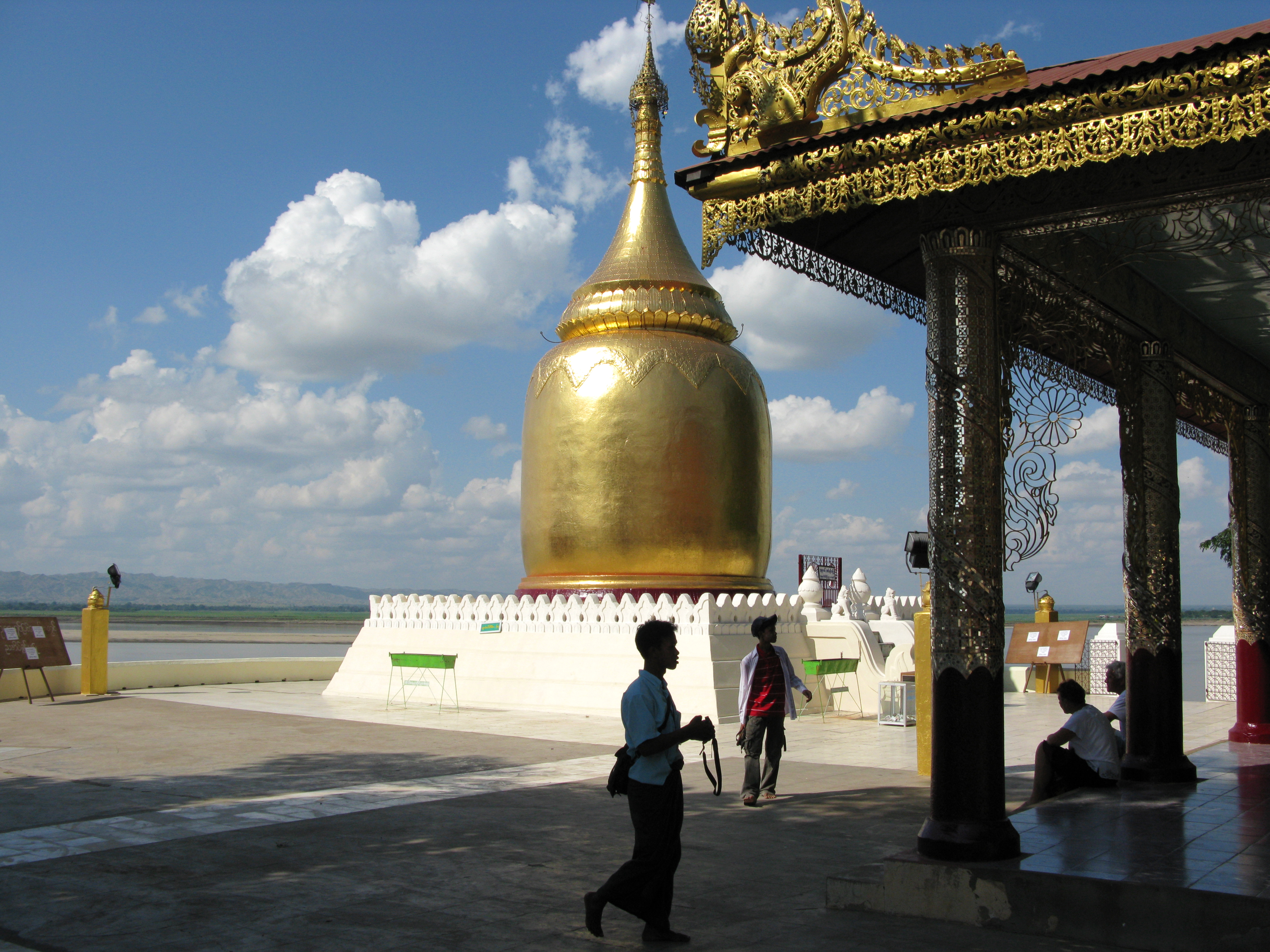
- Bupaya Pagoda
- Interactive map of the Bupaya Pagoda area

General information
- Type: Pilgrim and missionary of Buddhism
- Location: Bagan, Myanmar
- Coordinates: 21°10′35″N 94°51′29″E
- Completed: 2nd century or 11th century

Design and construction
- Architect: King Pyusawhti

Bupaya Pagoda (Burmese: ဗူးဘုရား,pronounced [bú pʰəjá]) is a notable Buddhist pagoda located in Bagan (formerly Pagan), in Mandalay Region, Myanmar, at a bend on the right bank of the Irrawaddy River. The small pagoda, which has a bulbous shaped dome, is widely believed to have been built by the third King of Pagan, Pyusawhti who ruled from 168 to 243 AD. It is one of the most notable shrines among the thousands of new or ruined Pagodas in Pagan, which is located about 90 miles (140 km) south of Mandalay.

The original pagoda was destroyed in the 1975 earthquake. As result of this earthquake, the bulbous pagoda broke into pieces and fell into the river. It was, however, fully reconstructed using modern materials, with lesser adherence to the original design. Subsequently, it was built as a gilded superstructure.

== Etymology ==
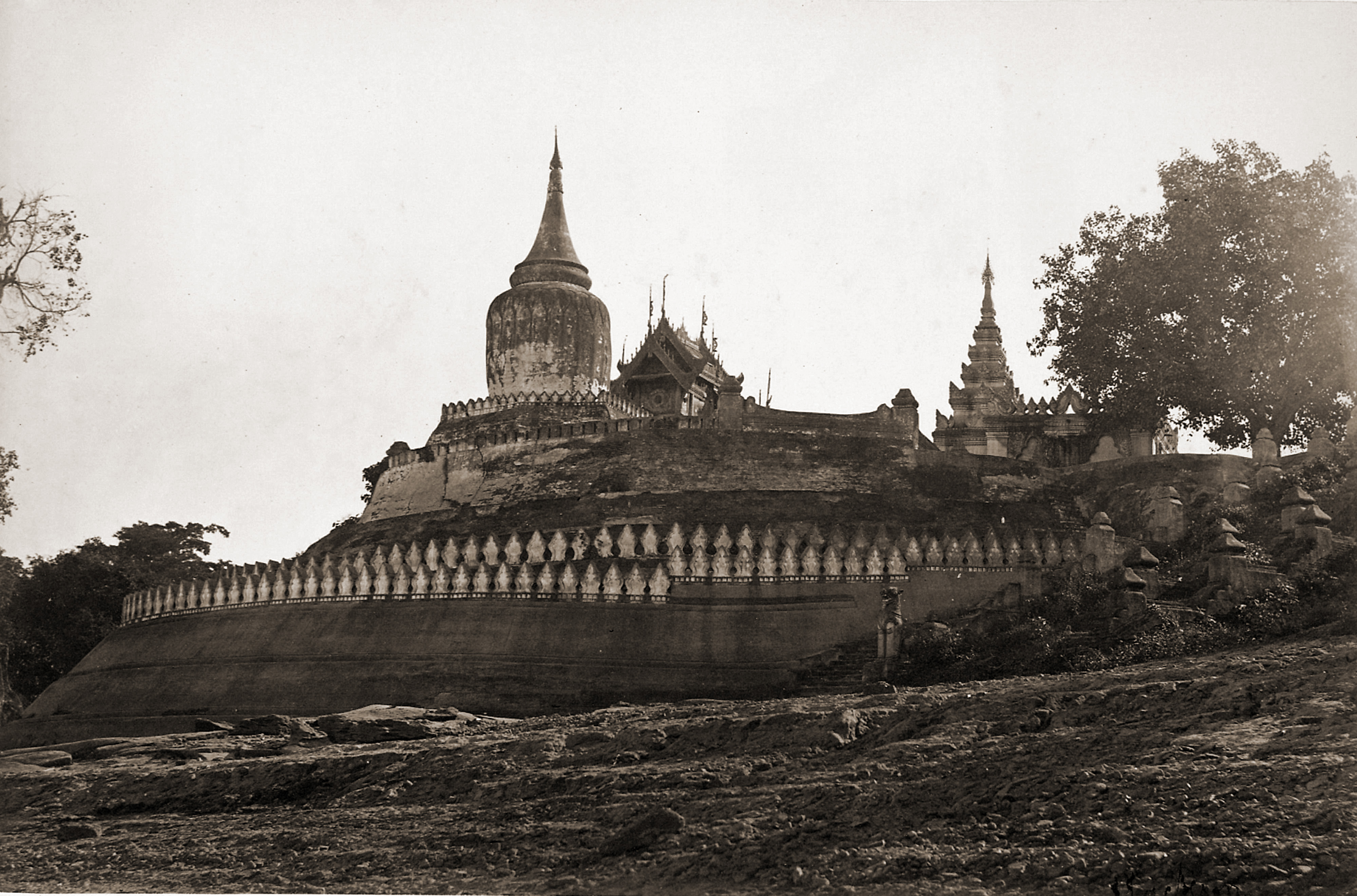
Original Pagoda as seen in 1868 destroyed in the 1975 earthquake.

The name 'Bupaya' is made up of two words 'bu' and 'paya' in the Burmese language. As the pagoda is bulbous and in the shape of gourd or pumpkin, the word 'Bu' in Burmese, which means "pumpkin" or "gourd" is the affixed to 'paya'. The word 'paya' means "pagoda". It is also said that King Pyusawhti, builder of the Pagoda, got the river bank deweeded as it was infested with gourd-like plant, considered a 'menace'.

== Legend ==
According to a legend, Pyusawti who built this pagoda, as a young man defeated "Five Great Menaces" that were detrimental to the interest of the city of Pagan. One of these five menaces was the extensive proliferation of the plant vines of gourd (at the location where the Bupaya Pagoda was built later). Subsequently, the then King pleased with the gallant act of Pyusawti gave him, as a reward, his daughter in marriage. Later, Pyusawti became the King of the region. During his reign, he built pagodas at each of the places where he had destroyed the 'Menaces'.

== Geography ==
The Pagoda is built on the edge of the Irrawaddy River (it is Myanmar's largest commercial waterway), within the walled city of Pagan (a large capital city of the Burmese Kingdom between the 11th and the 13th centuries), over a series of crenellated terraces. The river takes a bend at this location. It acted as a guide landmark to navigators. It was built amidst a huge bush.

== History ==
The dating of this pagoda has several versions. According to the earliest claimed historical records, the Bupaya Pagoda claimed as the oldest, was built in the 3rd century by the third king of Pagan, Pyusawdi, who ruled from 168 to 243 AD. However, it is also reported that the pagoda was commissioned in the 2nd century by King Pyusawti. On the basis of similar pagodas and city walls built in Pagan, it has been conjectured that Bupaya Pagoda was built in the 9th century or even 11th century.

However, the old pagoda getting destroyed completely and falling into the Irrawaddy River during the 1975 earthquake, has indelibly scotched any arguments on the subject of its dating.

== Structure ==
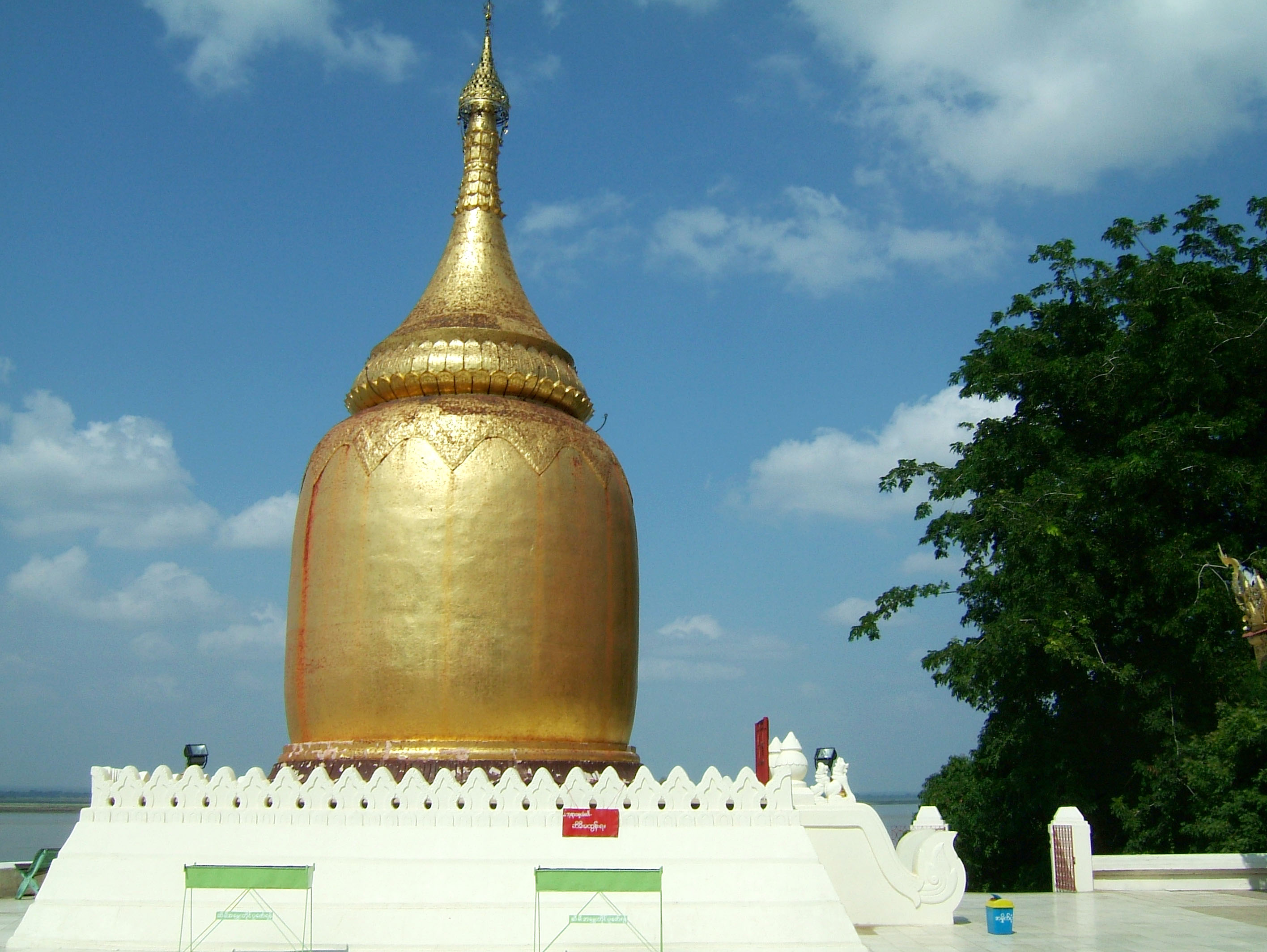
A new pagoda at the entrance to the main Bupaya Pagoda in Bagan.

In keeping with the tradition of building pagodas in Myanmar, the Bupaya Pagoda also conformed to the norms set for such structures. The pagoda had a massive gravity-type pyramidal profile. It was built with bricks and impressively decorated. It was a bell-shaped dome built over diminishing terraces. A finial crowned the dome. The pagoda enshrined Buddha's relics.

However, the new Bupaya Pagoda built at the same location in 1976–78, after the earthquake, is a hollow reinforced concrete structure (replacing the traditional brick structure of the past). It has been built on the traditional plan of a polygonal base. The pagoda rises up in "a series of crenellated semi-circular terraces overlooking the river". It is now fully gilded (pictured). The pagoda is now a very distinct landmark on the shores of the Irrawaddy River.
