= Dhammayangyi Temple =

Largest Buddhist temple in Bagan, Myanmar

Dhammayangyi Temple ဓမ္မရံကြီးဘုရား
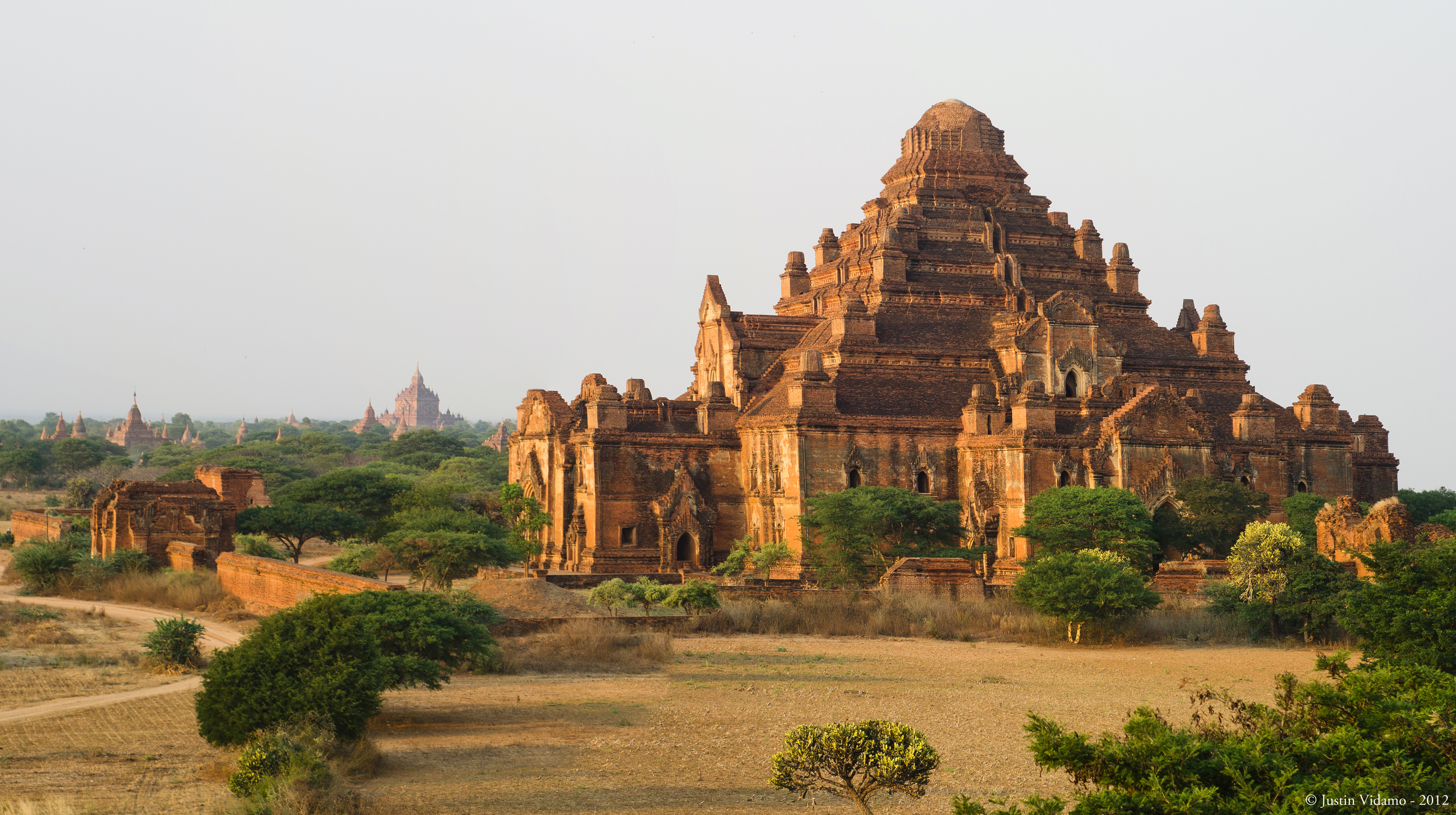
- Dhammayangyi Temple as seen from the northwest

- Location within Burma

Religion
- Affiliation: Theravada Buddhism

Location
- Country: Myanmar
- Coordinates: 21°09′43.11″N 94°52′22.51″E

Architecture
- Completed: 1167-1170; 856 years ago

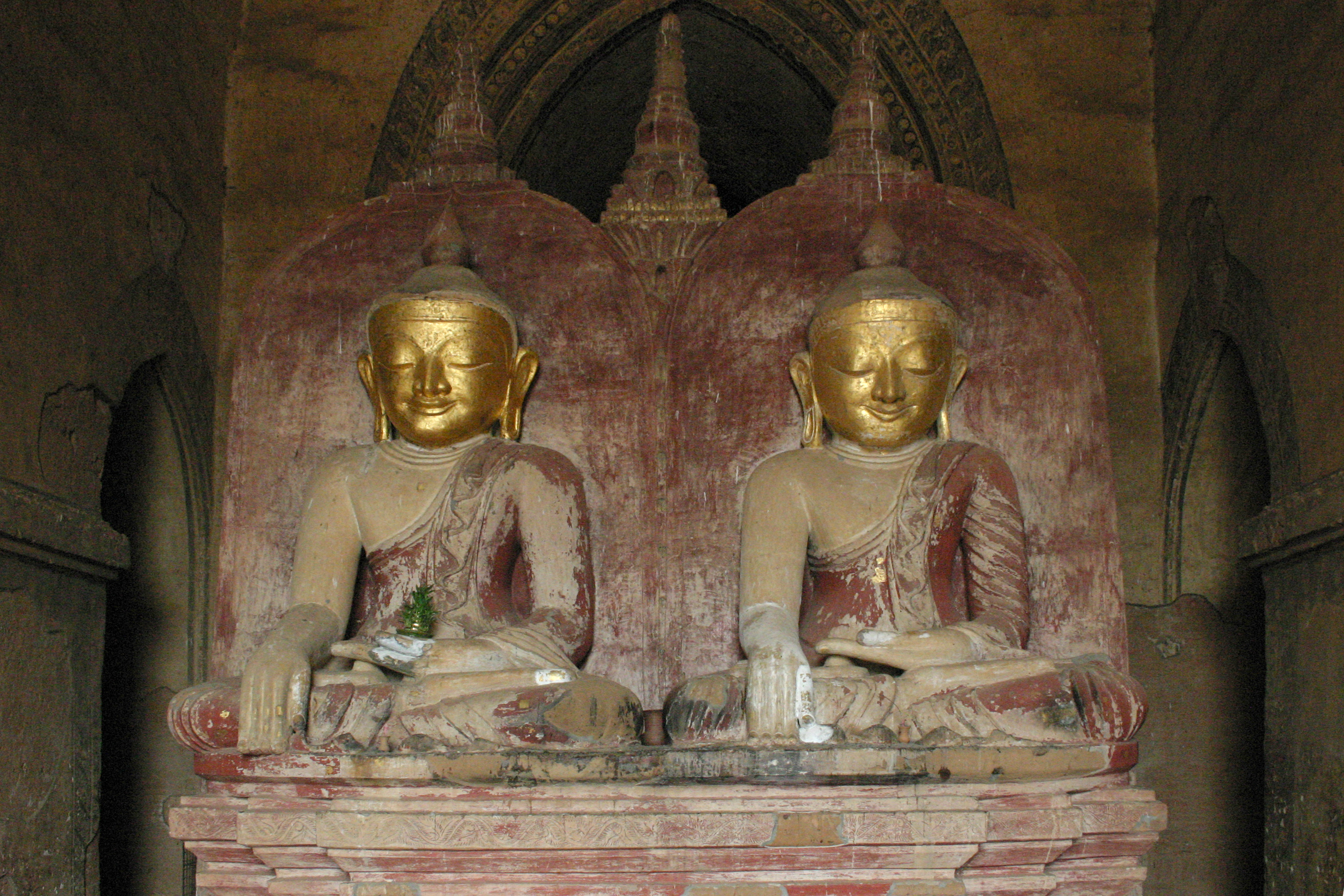
Buddha statues inside the Dhammayangyi Temple

Dhammayangyi Temple (Burmese: ဓမ္မရံကြီးဘုရား, pronounced [dəma̰jàɰ̃dʑí pʰəjá]; Pali: Dhammaraṃsi) is a Buddhist temple located in Bagan, Myanmar. Largest of all the temples in Bagan, the Dhammayan, as it is popularly known, was built during the reign of King Narathu (1167-1170). Narathu, who came to the throne by assassinating his father Alaungsithu and his elder brother, presumably built this largest temple to atone for his sins.

The Dhammayangyi is the widest temple in Bagan, and features a layout similar to that of Ananda Temple. Burmese chronicles state that while the construction of the temple was in the process, the king was assassinated by some Indians and thus the temple was not completed. Sinhalese sources however indicate that the king was killed by Sinhalese invaders.

The temple's interior is bricked up for unknown reasons, thus only the four porches and the outer corridors are accessible.

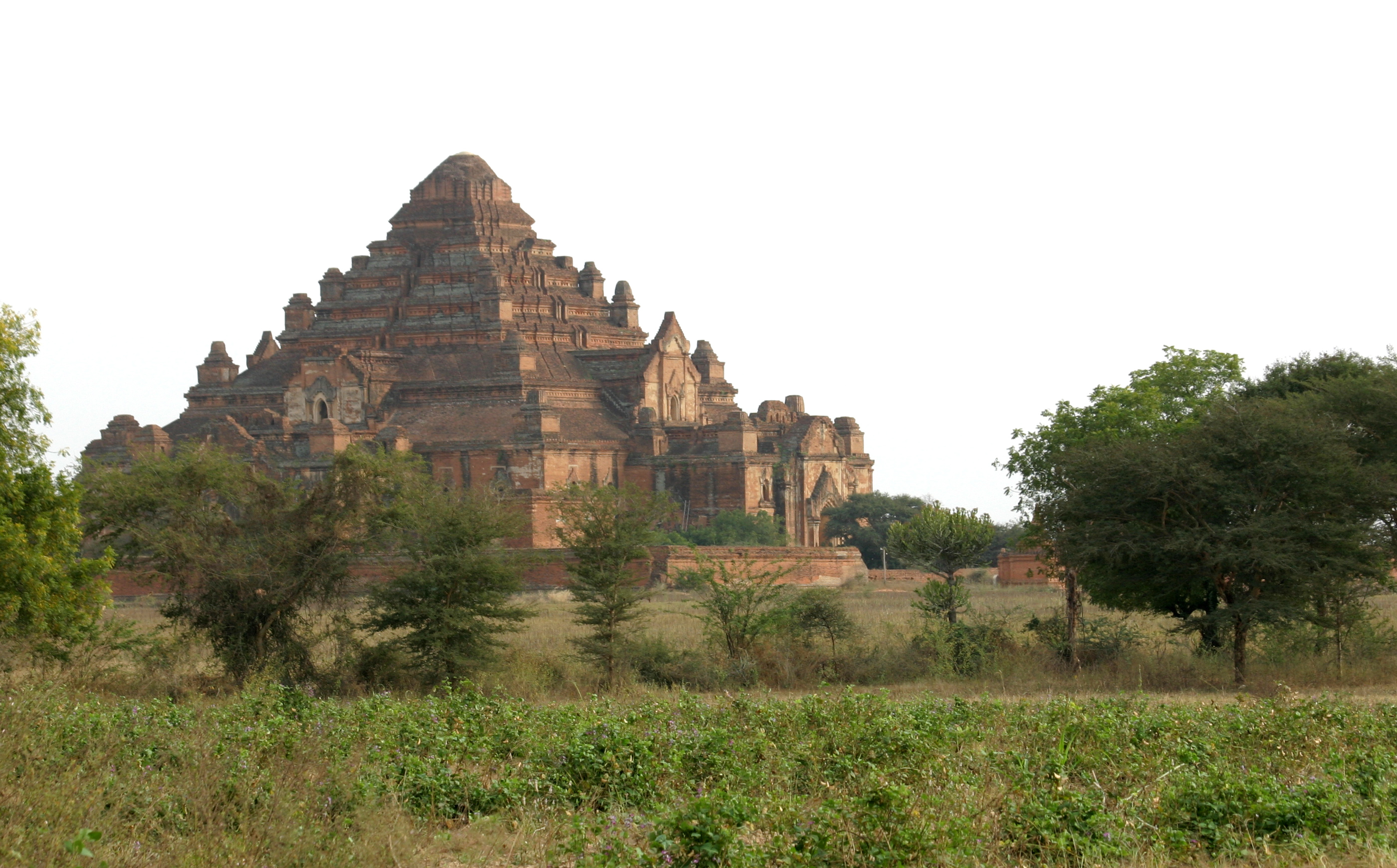
Another Angle of the Dhammayangyi Temple
