= Buddhist architecture =

Style of building

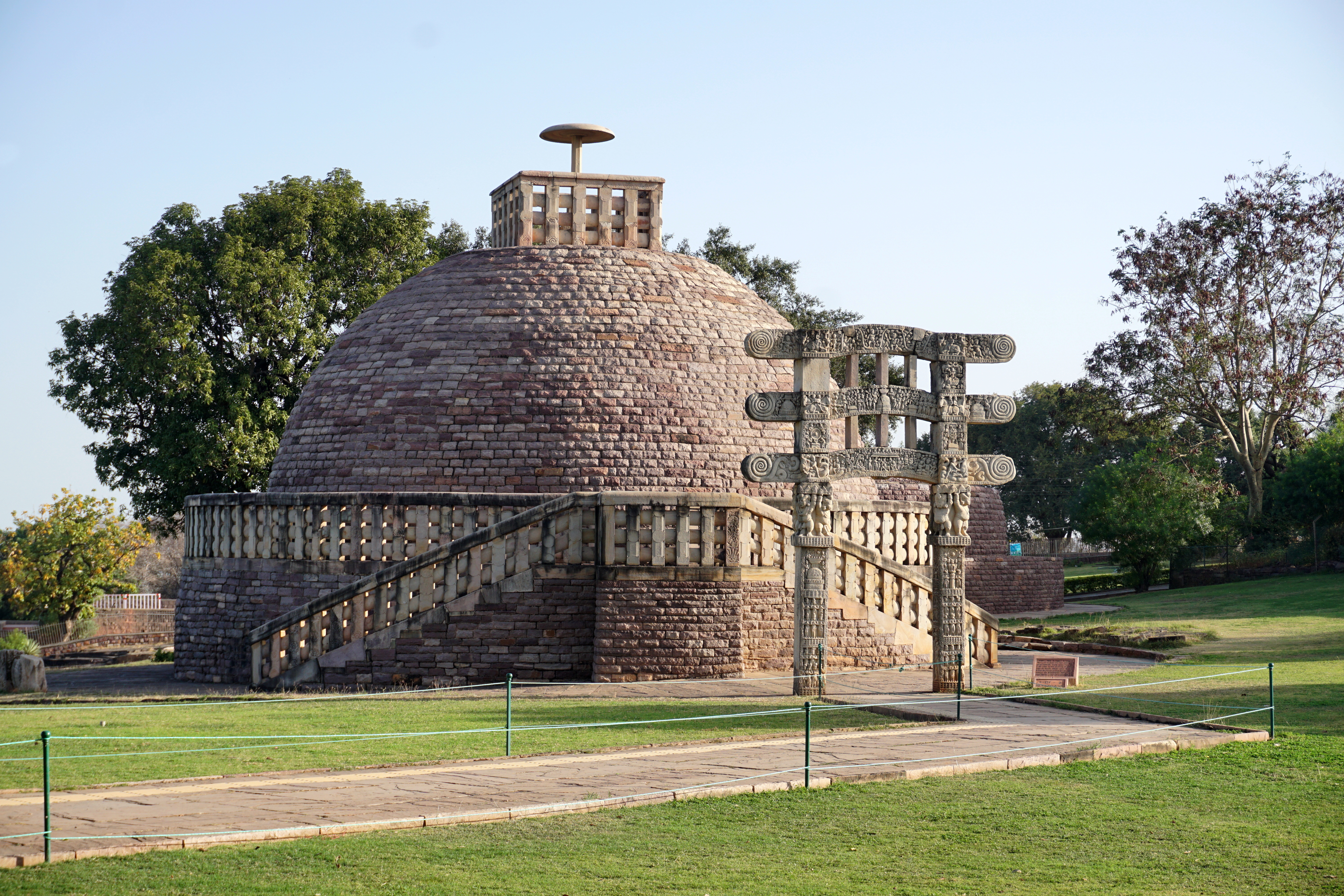
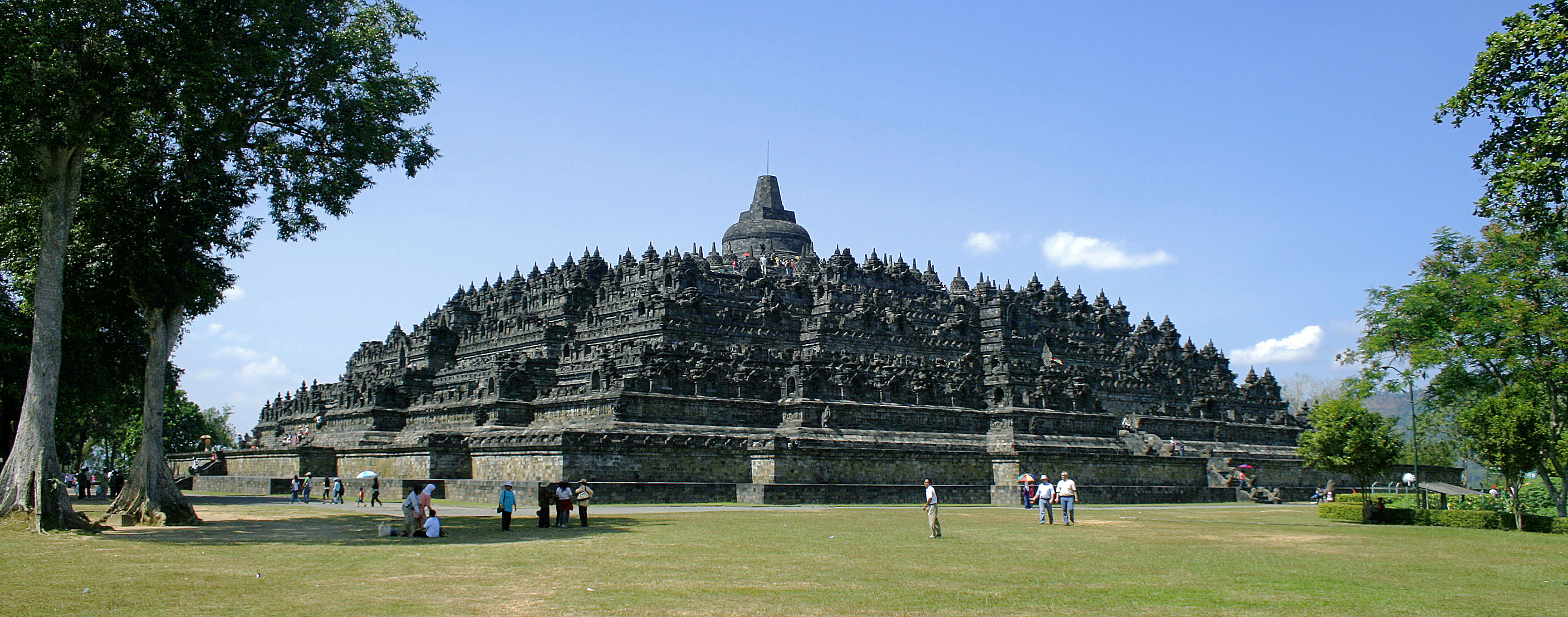
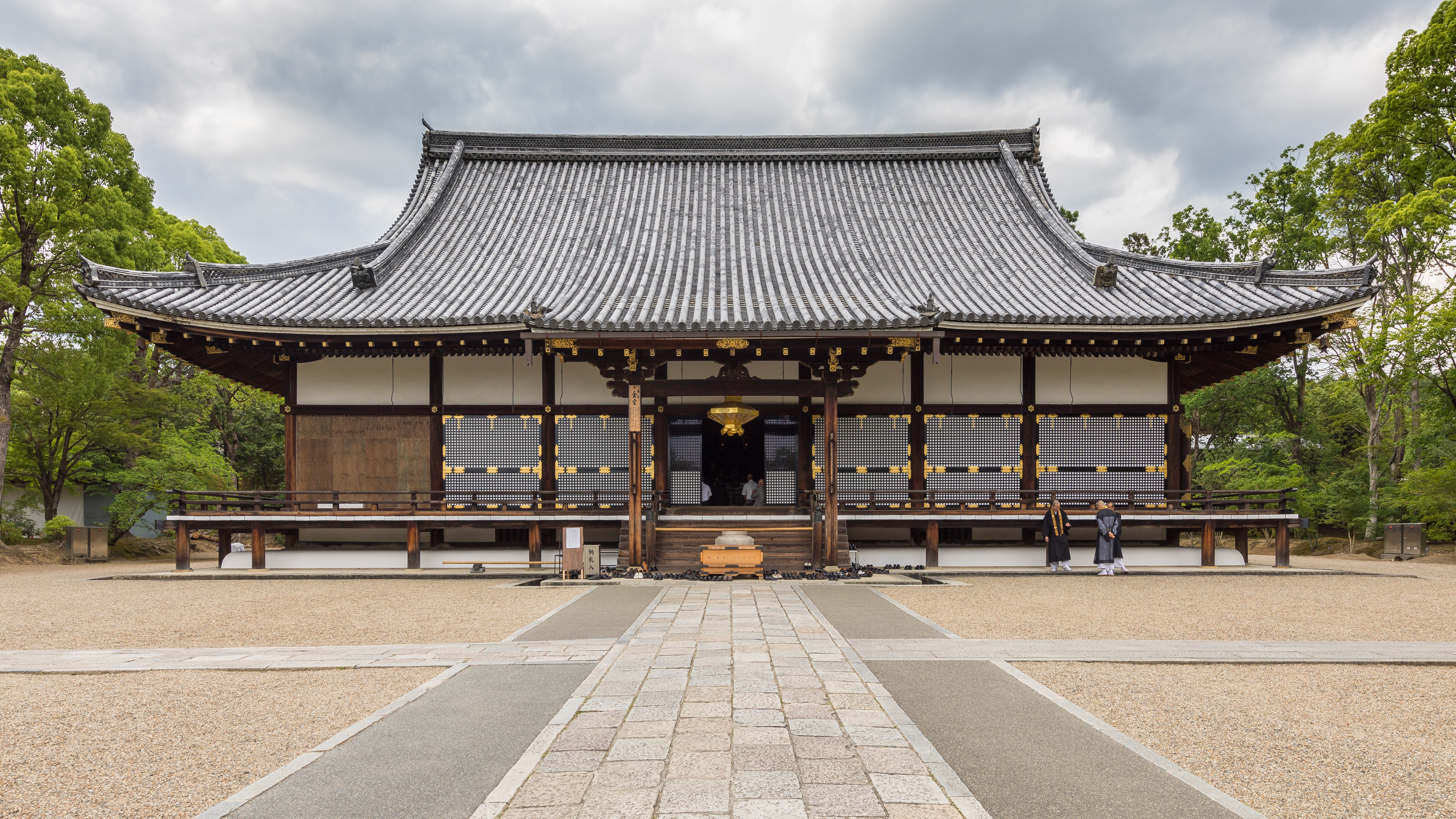
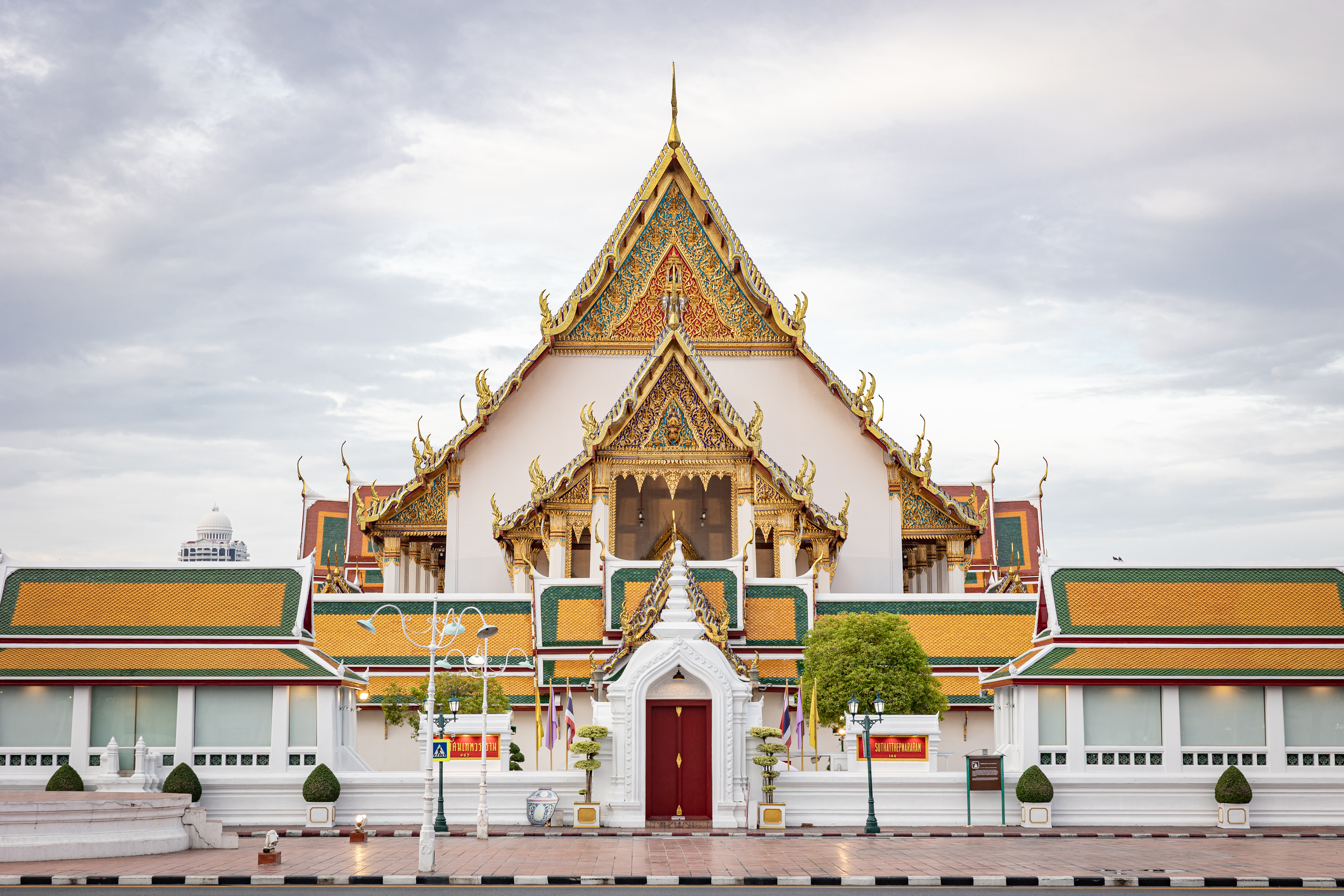
Stylistic differences of Buddhist temple architecture in Asia from left to right: Sanchi Stupa in Madhya Pradesh, India, Borobudur in Central Java Indonesia, Ninna-ji in Kyoto, Japan, and Wat Suthat in Bangkok, Thailand.

Buddhist architecture is the architectural style that adheres to the philosophy and religious practices of Buddhism. The origins of Buddhism date back to the 5th century BCE in the Indian subcontinent. Buddhist architectural forms were developed to serve monastic, ritual, and commemorative functions. Distinctive features such as stupas, vihāras (monasteries), and chaityas (prayer halls) are often seen in Buddhist temples.

As Buddhism spread throughout and beyond South Asia, its architectural traditions evolved and diversified, leading to a wide range of regional adaptations across Southeast Asia and East Asia. It has been argued that certain stylistic features of Buddhist architecture, particularly the stupa, may have been influenced by elements from Hindu temple architecture, such as the shikhara. Over time, these forms evolved into the pagoda, a prominent architectural feature seen throughout the Indosphere and East Asia

== Early development in India ==
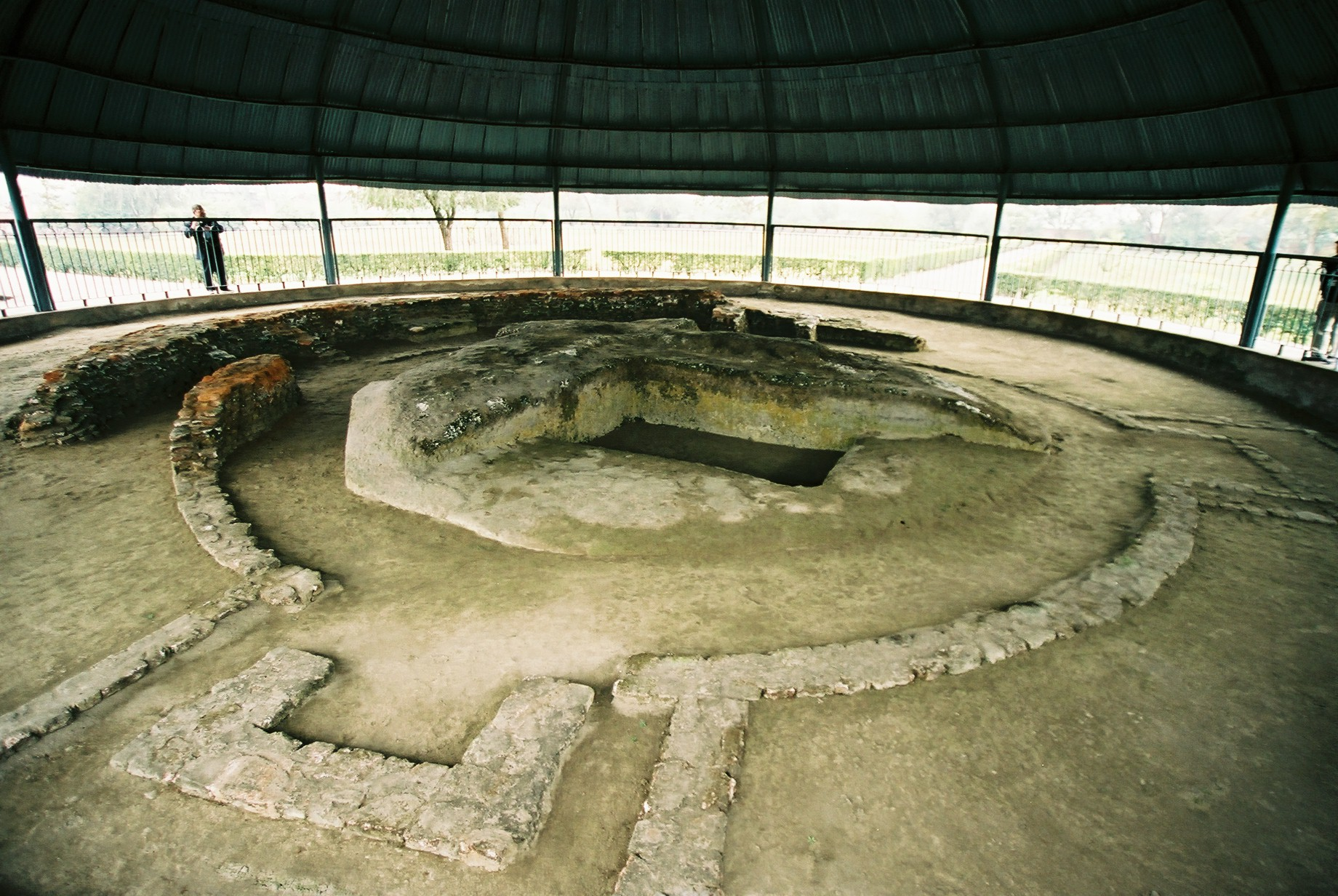
The Relic Stupa of Vaishali in Bihar, India which is likely the earliest archaeologically known stupa

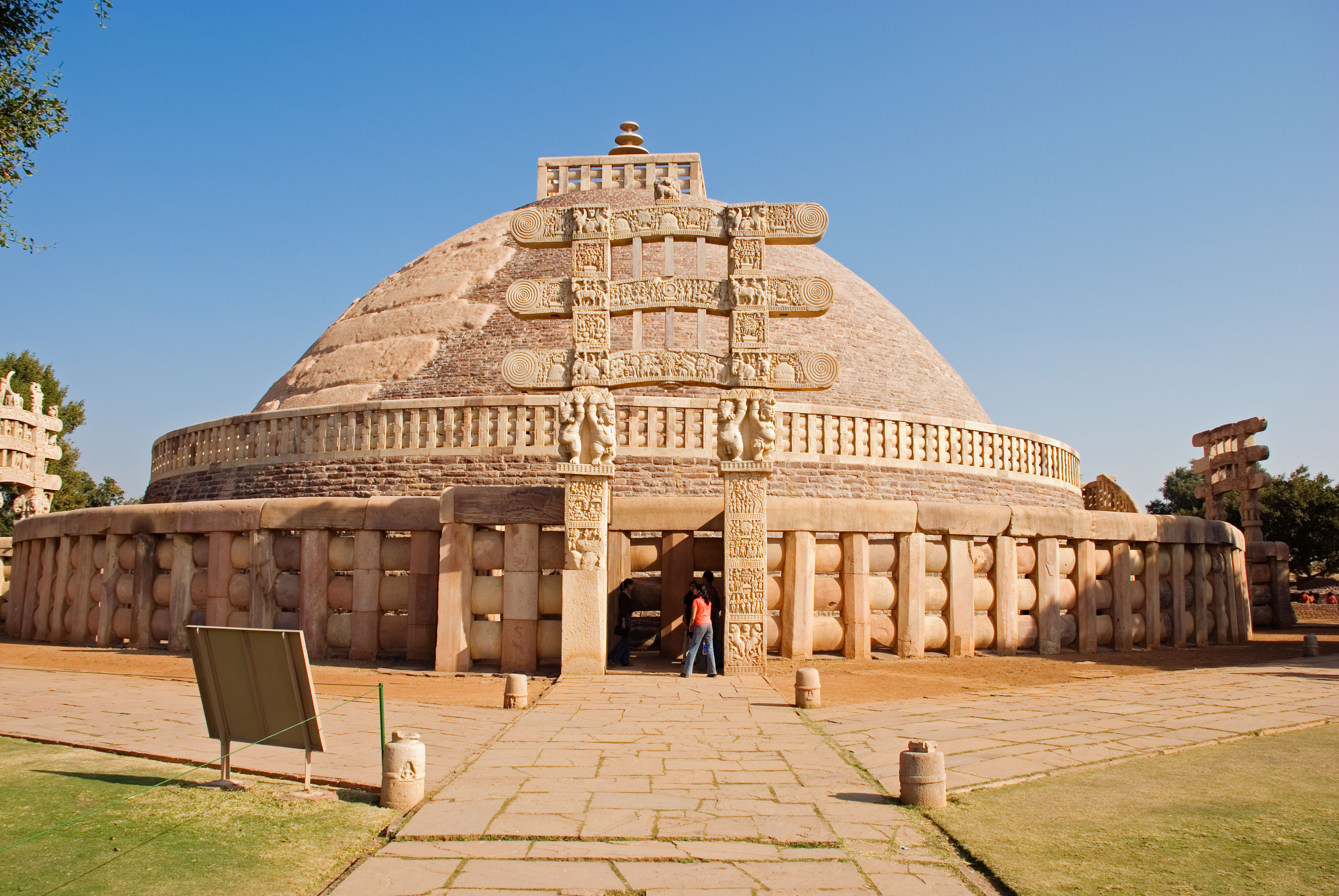
The Great Stupa in Sanchi

Three types of structures are associated with the architecture style of early Buddhism: monasteries (viharas), places to venerate relics (stupas), and shrines or prayer halls (chaityas, also called chaitya grihas), which later came to be called temples in some places.

A characteristic new development at Buddhist religious sites was the stupa. The initial function of a stupa was the veneration and safe-guarding of the relics of Gautama Buddha. The earliest archaeologically known example of a stupa is the Relic Stupa of Vaishali located in Bihar, India. In accordance with changes in religious practice, stupas were gradually incorporated into chaitya-grihas (prayer halls). These are exemplified by the complexes of the Ajanta Caves and the Ellora Caves. The Mahabodhi Temple at Bodh Gaya in Bihar, India is another well-known example.

One of the earliest Buddhist sites still in existence is at Sanchi, India, and this is centred on a stupa said to have been built by King Ashoka (273–236 BCE). The original simple structure is encased in a later, more decorative one, and over two centuries the whole site was elaborated upon. The four cardinal points are marked by elaborate stone gateways.

As with Buddhist art, architecture followed the spread of Buddhism throughout south and east Asia and it was the early Indian models that served as a first reference point, even though Buddhism virtually disappeared from India itself in the 10th century.

Decoration of Buddhist sites became steadily more elaborate through the last two centuries BCE, with the introduction of tablets and friezes, including human figures, particularly on stupas. However, the Buddha was not represented in human form until the 1st century CE. Instead, aniconic symbols were used. This is treated in more detail in Buddhist art, Aniconic phase. It influenced the development of temples, which eventually became a backdrop for Buddha images in most cases.

As Buddhism spread, Buddhist architecture diverged in style, reflecting the similar trends in Buddhist art. Building form was also influenced to some extent by the different forms of Buddhism in the northern countries, practising Mahayana Buddhism in the main and in the south where Theravada Buddhism prevailed.

== Regional Buddhist architecture ==
=== China ===
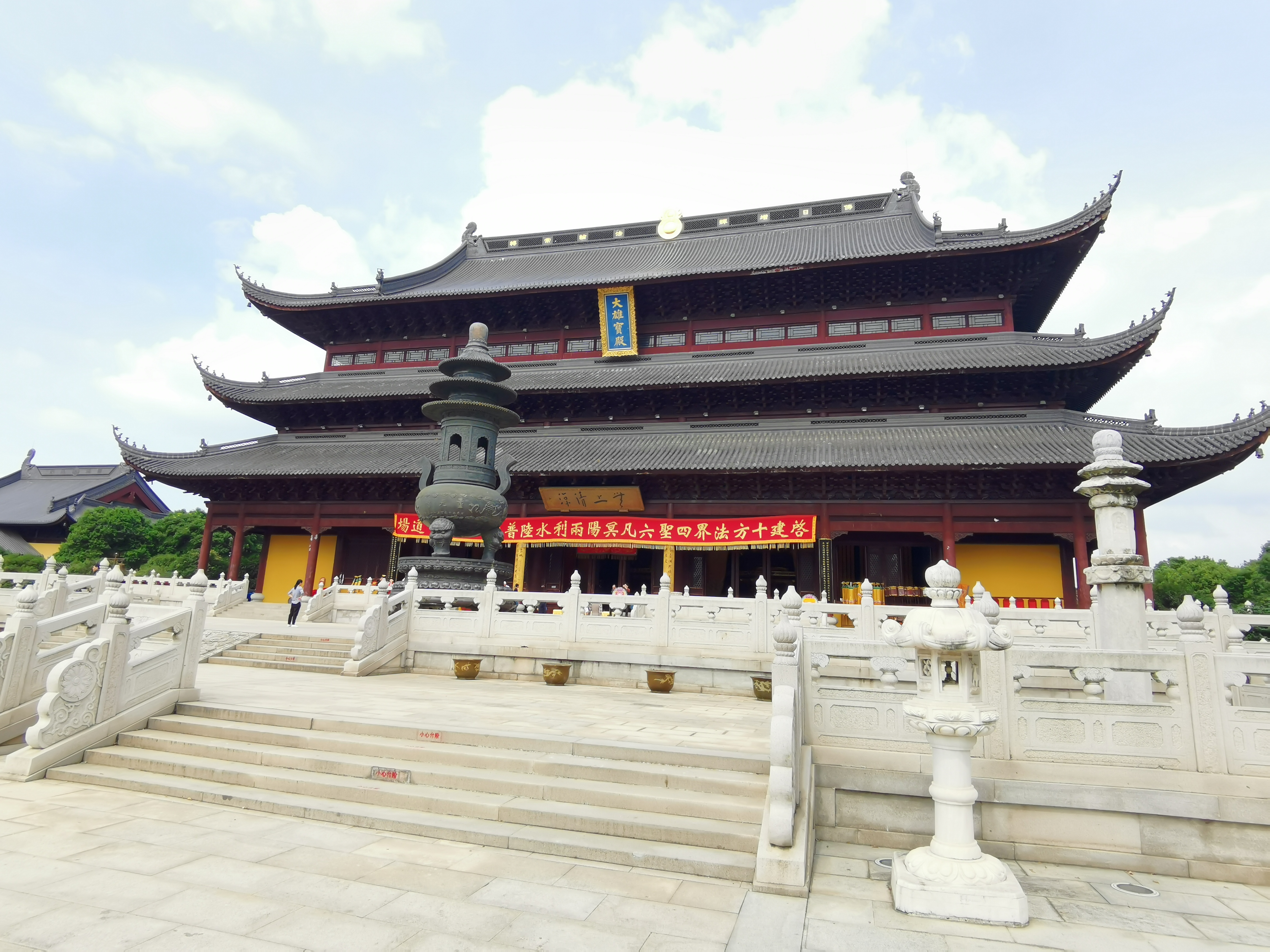
Mahavira Hall of Chongyuan Temple at Suzhou.

When Buddhism came to China, Buddhist architecture came along with it. There were many monasteries built, equaling about 45,000. These monasteries were filled with examples of Buddhist architecture, and because of this, they hold a very prominent place in Chinese architecture. One of the earliest surviving example is the brick pagoda at the Songyue Monastery in Dengfeng County.

=== Indonesia ===
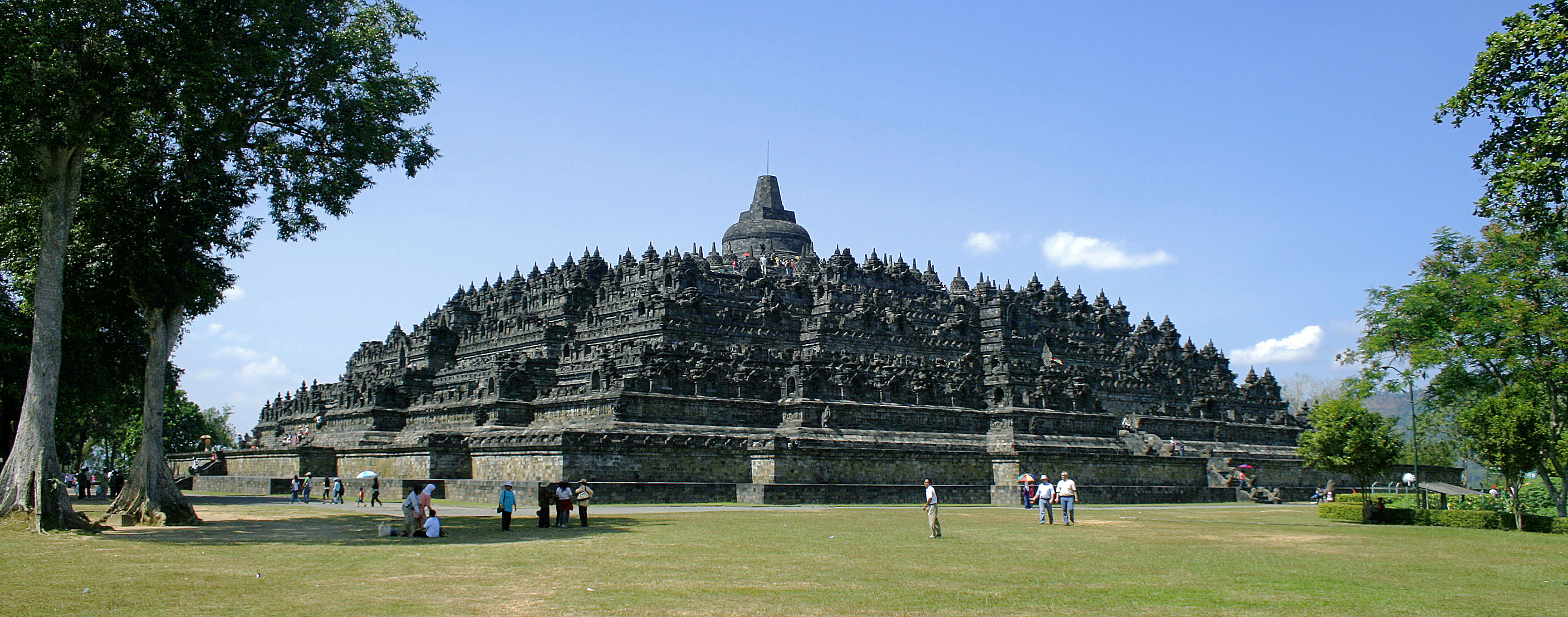
Borobudur, 9th-century Mahayana Buddhist temple in Magelang Regency, in Central Java, Indonesia. It is decorated with 2,672 relief panels and 504 Buddha statues.

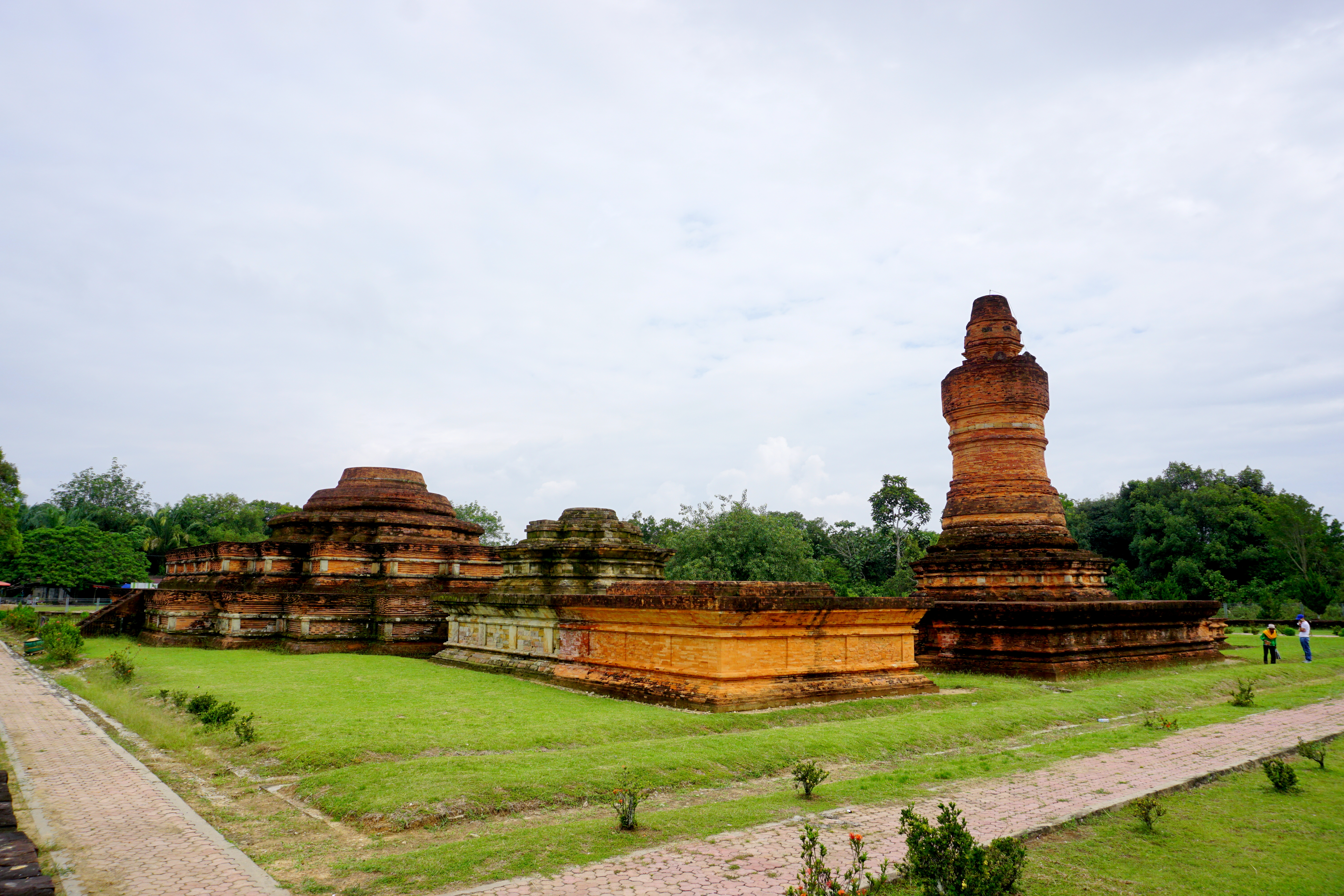
Muara Takus temple, an 11th-century Buddhist temple in Sumatra.

Buddhism and Hinduism reached the Indonesian archipelago in the early first millennia. The oldest surviving temple structure in Java is Batujaya temples in Karawang, West Java, dated as early as 5th century. The temple was a Buddhist sites, as evidence of the discovered Buddhist votive tablets, and the brick stupa structure.

The apogee of ancient Indonesian Buddhist art and architecture was the era of Javanese Shailendra dynasty that ruled the Mataram kingdom in Central Java circa 8th to 9th century CE. The most remarkable example is the 9th century Borobudur, a massive stupa that took form of an elaborate stepped pyramid that took plan of stone mandala. The walls and balustrades are decorated with exquisite bas reliefs, covering a total surface area of 2,500 square metres. Around the circular platforms are 72 openwork stupas, each containing a statue of the Buddha. Borobudur is recognised as the largest Buddhist temple in the world.

=== Thailand ===
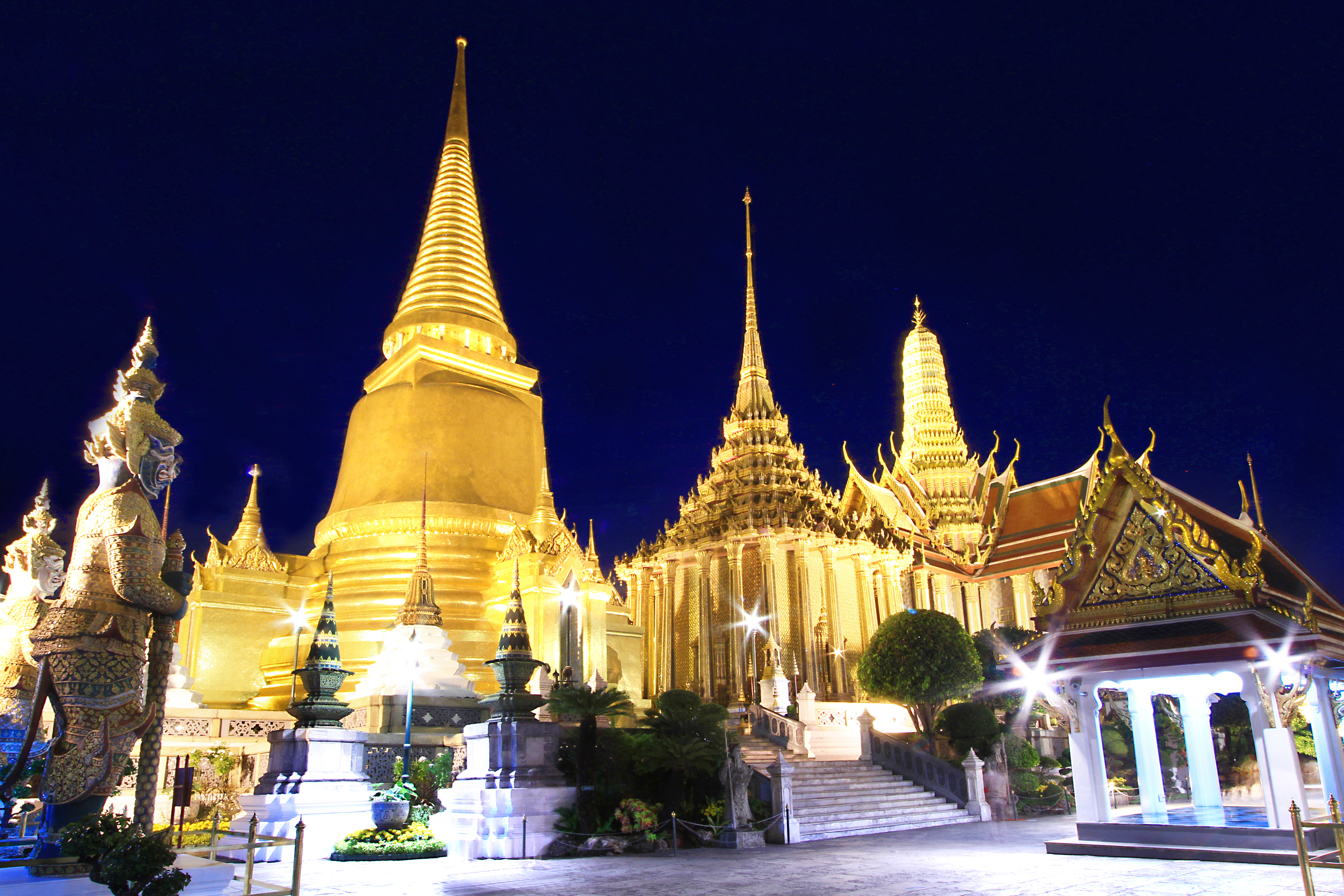
Wat Phra Kaew, Bangkok, Thailand

In Thailand, Buddhist temples are known as wats, from the Pāḷi vāṭa, meaning "enclosure." A wat usually consists of two parts: the Phutthawat (worship area dedicated to Buddha) and the Sangkhawat (monastery dedicated for Sangha).

Thai Buddhist temples usually contains golden chedi in the form of a bell-shaped stupa tower covered with gold leaf, containing a relic chamber. Another typical feature is Prang tower in the top center of the Buddhist temple structure. Thai Buddhist temples consists of several structures, including Ubosot (ordination hall), Wihan (vihara), Mondop (mandapa), Ho trai (library), and Sala (open pavilion), Ho rakhang (bell tower), and other supporting buildings.

All of those temple structures display multiple roof tiers. The use of ornamented tiers is reserved for roofs on temples, palaces and important buildings. Two or three tiers are most often used, but some royal temples have four.

=== Japan ===
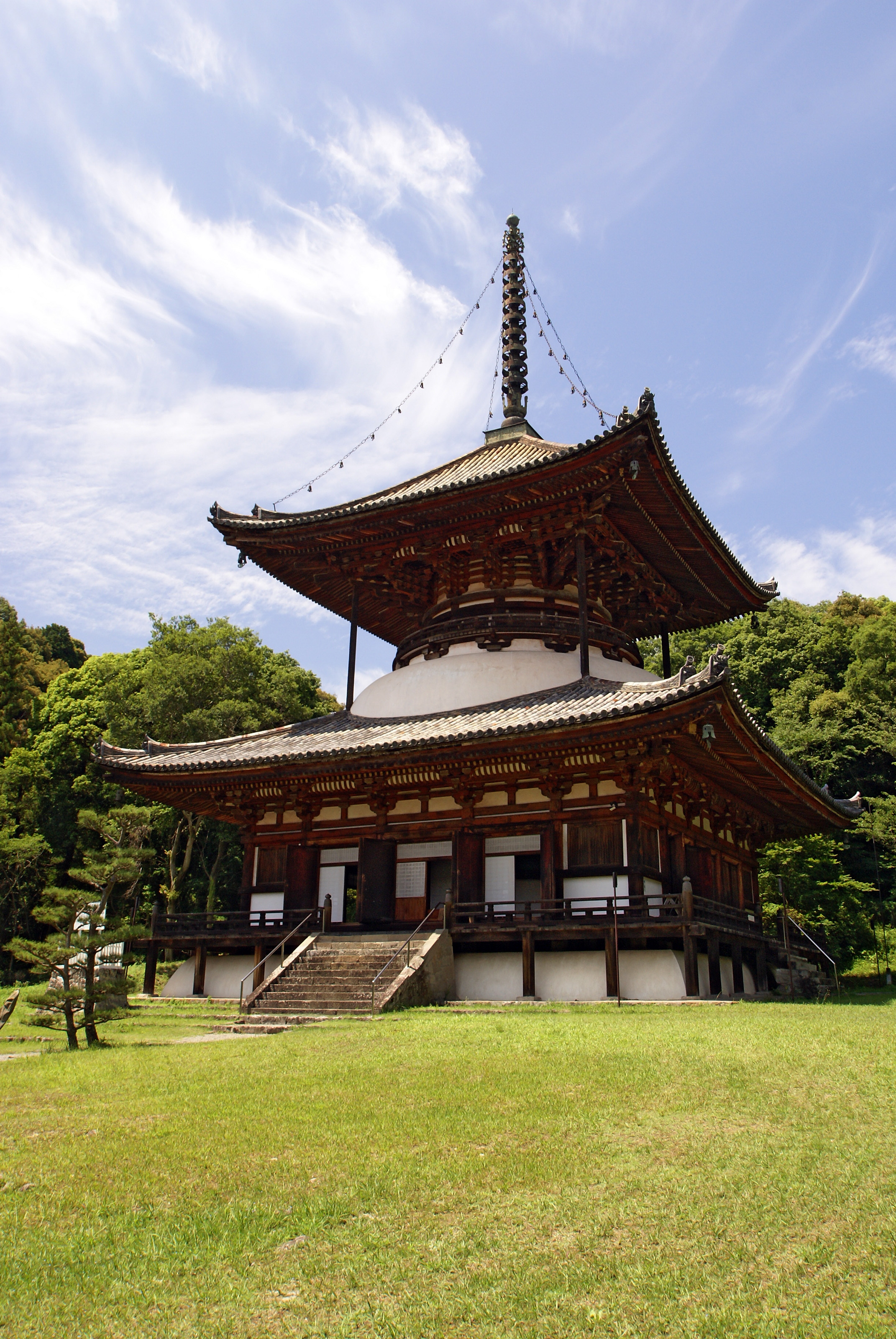
Negoro-ji in Iwade, Wakayama Prefecture, Japan.

After Buddhism arrived from the continent via the Three Kingdoms of Korea in the 6th century, an effort was initially made to reproduce the original buildings as faithfully as possible, but gradually local versions of continental styles were developed both to meet Japanese tastes and to solve problems posed by local weather, which is more rainy and humid than in China. The first Buddhist sects were Nara's six Nanto Rokushū (南都六宗, Nara six sects), (Note: The six sects were called Sanron-, Jōjitsu-, Hossō-, Kusha-, Ritsu-, and Kegon-shū.) followed during the Heian period by Kyoto's Shingon and Tendai. Later, during the Kamakura period, in Kamakura were born the Jōdo and the native Japanese sect Nichiren-shū. At roughly the same time, Zen Buddhism arrived from China, strongly influencing all other sects in many ways, including in architecture.

Stylistically, Buddhist temples and Shinto shrines share common characteristics under the Japanese philosophy of Shinbutsu-shūgō (神仏習合). However, during the Meiji Restoration, Emperor Meiji established Shinbutsu bunri (神仏分離) which was a separation of the native Japanese religion of Shinto from Buddhism. It was common for a Buddhist temple to be built inside or next to a shrine, or for a shrine to include Buddhist sub-temples. If a shrine housed a Buddhist temple, it was called a jingū-ji (神宮寺, lit. shrine temple). Analogously, temples all over Japan used to adopt tutelary kami (chinju (鎮守/鎮主) After the forcible separation of temples and shrines ordered by the new government, the connection between the two religions was officially severed, however is culturally unpopular with Shinbutsu-shūgō being in practice and is still visible today.

=== Hawaii ===
Many of the Buddhist temples in Hawaii have an architectural style which is specific to the islands. Japanese immigrants who migrated to Hawaii did not have access to the same materials they would have in Japan, and the land structure called for different building techniques. Because these Japanese immigrants had all the knowledge of Buddhism and were exceptional craftsmen, these temples ended up being a good personification of their religion.

There are 5 styles of architecture that can be found in the Buddhist temples of Hawaii. The styles vary because of the time periods they were used in.

==== Converted houses ====
This was the earliest form of Buddhist temples in Hawaii. They took a larger plantation house and converted them into places of worship by adding things like an altar or shrines. This style offered an inexpensive way to build temples, and using residential space made the worshipers feel more connected. This style dropped in popularity during the 20th century.

==== Traditional Japanese ====
This style originated when Japanese immigrants with the existing skill of building temples and shrines moved to Hawaii. These were made to be similar to the original Japanese temples, but certain aspects had to be changed because of lesser access to materials and tools. Characteristics of this style are beam and post structure, elevated floors, and hip-and-gable roofs. The interiors had the same structure as their original counterparts in Japan.

==== Simplified Japanese ====
This style originated with Japanese immigrants who did not have the greatest shrine and temple building skills. These immigrants still wanted the temples to have their original feel, but lacked the skill to do it, so the building techniques they used were simplified. Some characteristics of this style are straight hip-and-gable roofs, as opposed to the long, sloping ones, a separate social hall, and covered entryway. These temples doubled as community centers, and were similar in style to western churches.

==== Indian Western ====
This style is unique to Hawaii, originating from Pan-Asian Buddhism, which was a combination of Indian, Japanese, and Western Buddhism. When the first temple of this style was built, the architects that were hired had no previous experience in Buddhist architecture. The style was popular up until the 1960s. It was one of the most popular styles of Buddhist architecture in Hawaii; smaller temples that could not afford to hire architects to do this to their temple would take certain aspects of this style and apply it to their temple. The interiors of these temples are very similar to the original temples in Japan.

==== House of worship ====
This style is also very similar to western churches. It became popular in the 1960s. These temples are usually made of concrete, and the roof styles vary unlike the other styles of temples. The subcategories of this style are residential, warehouse, church, and Japanesque. Like the other styles, while the exterior is dramatically different, the interior mostly remained similar to the temples in Japan.

== Examples ==
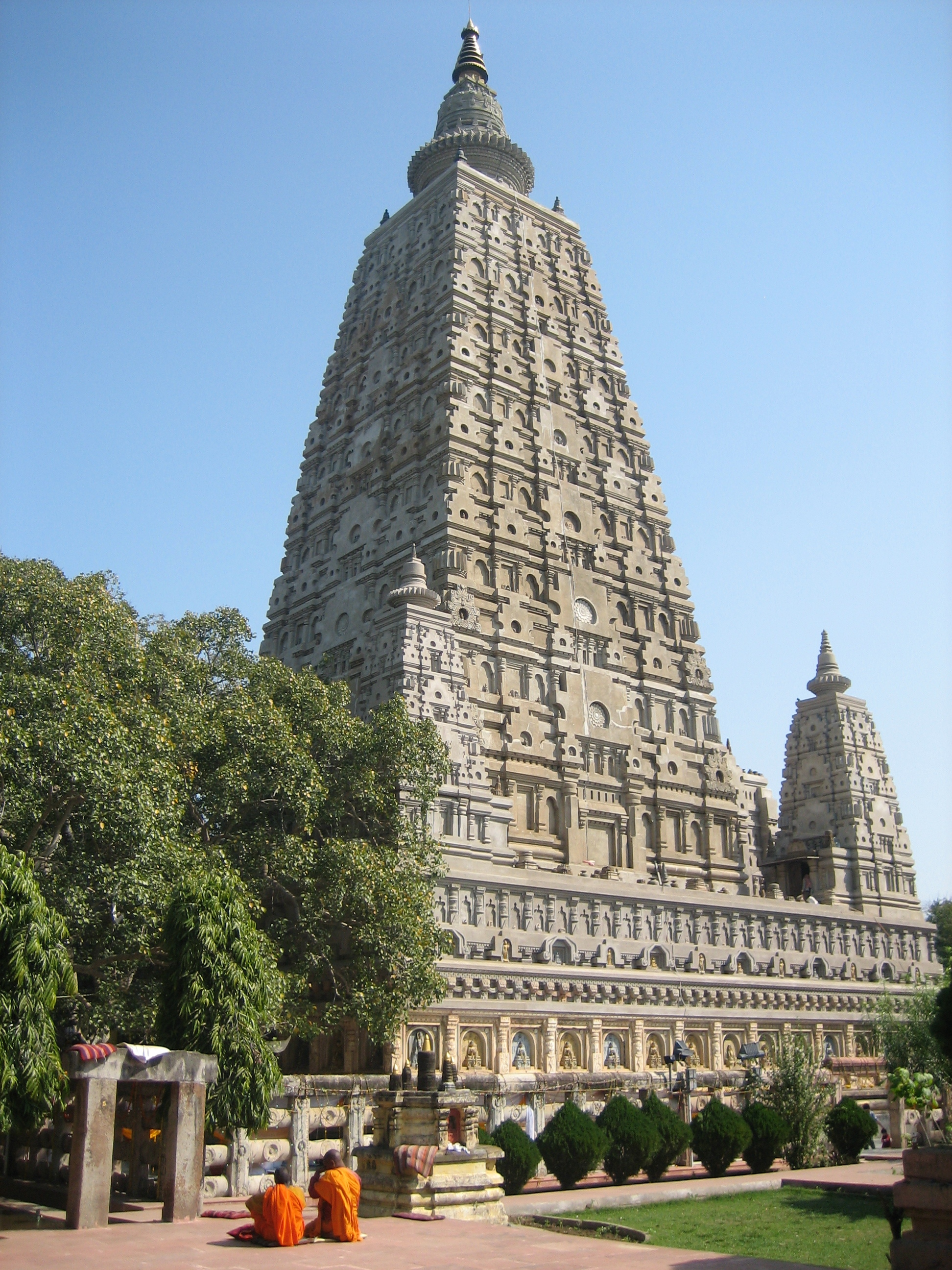
Mahabodhi temple, Gaya.

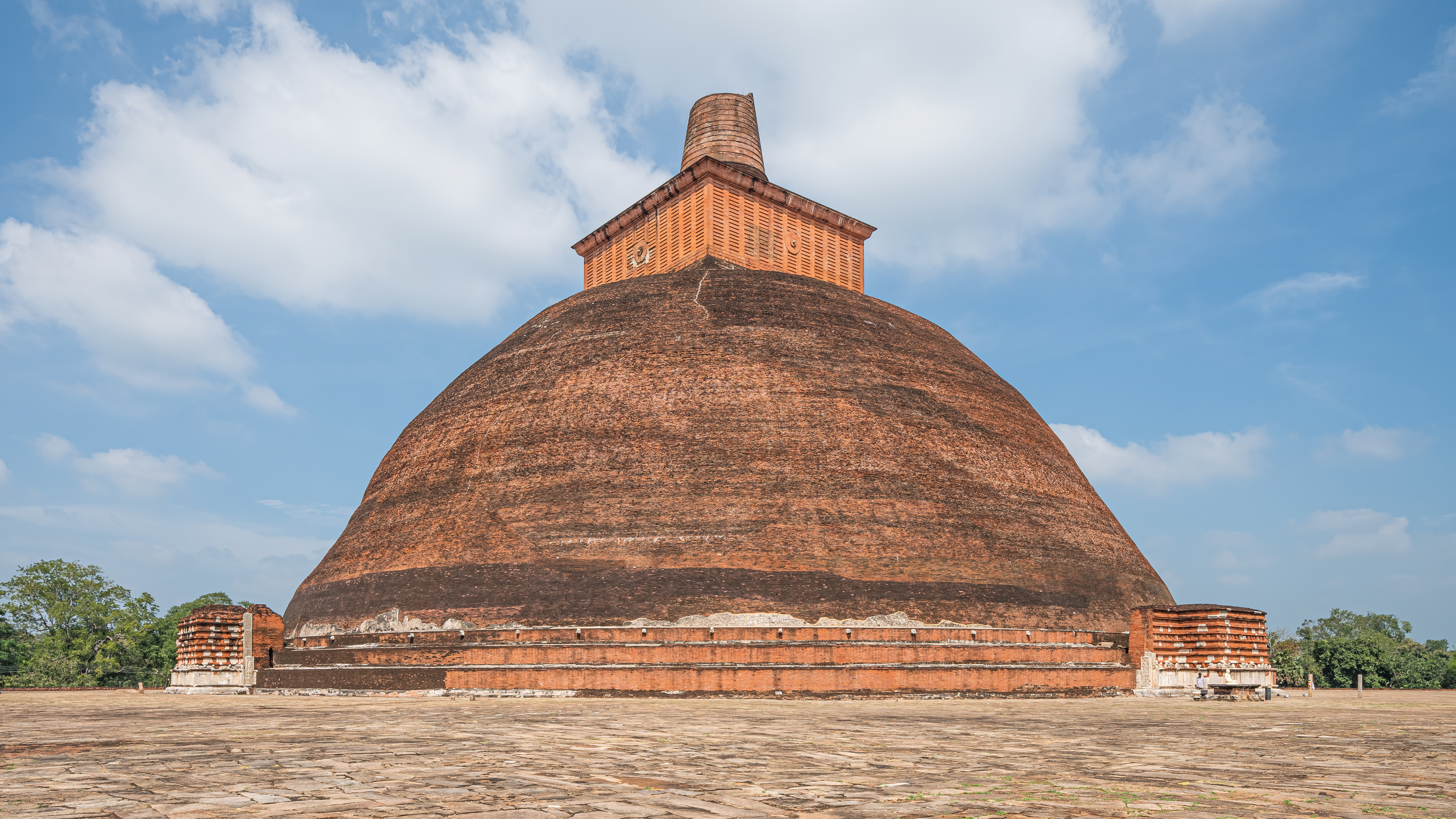
Jetavanaramaya stupa is an example of brick-clad Buddhist architecture in Sri Lanka.

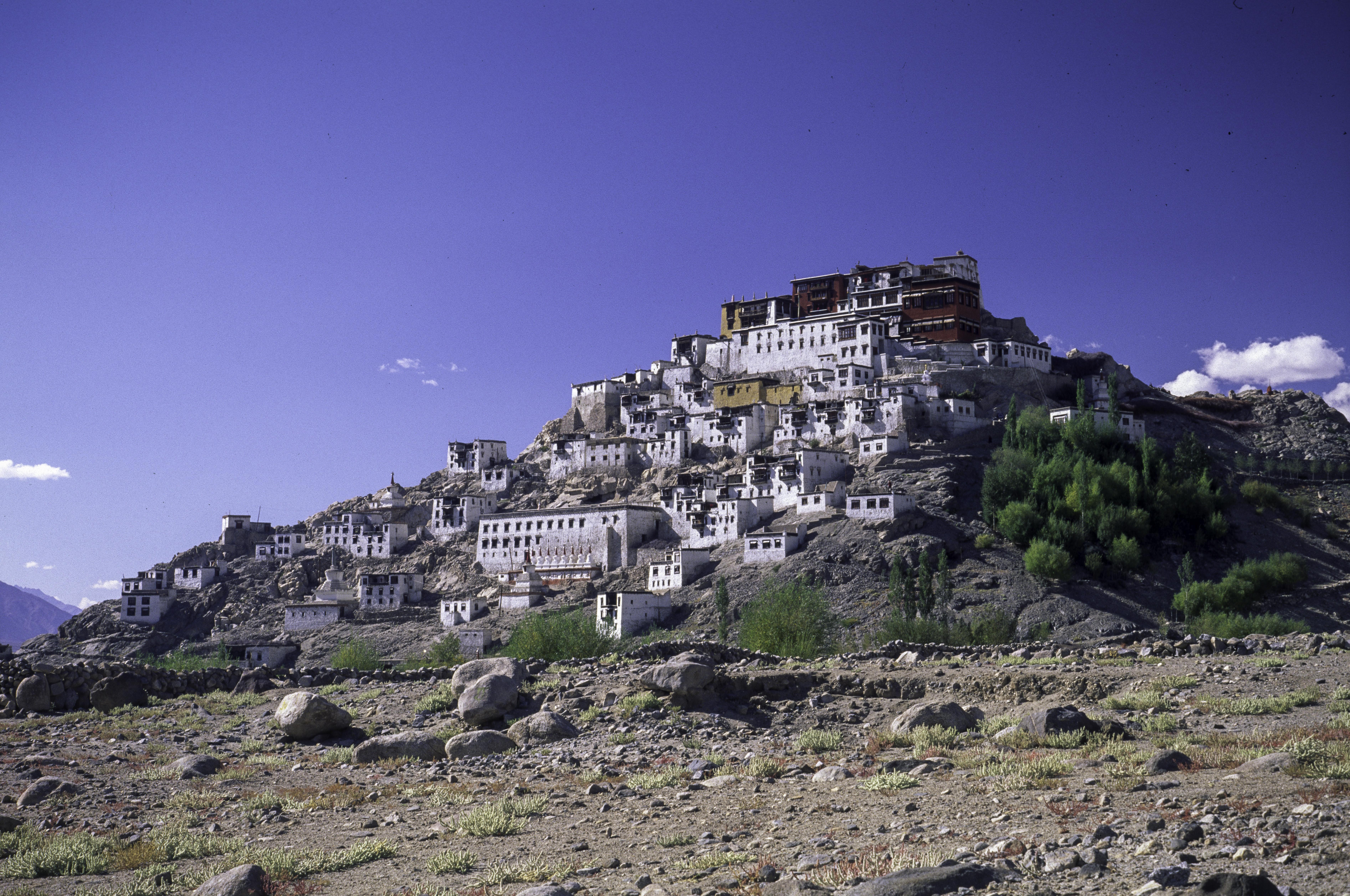
Thikse Monastery is the largest gompa in Ladakh, built in the 1500s.

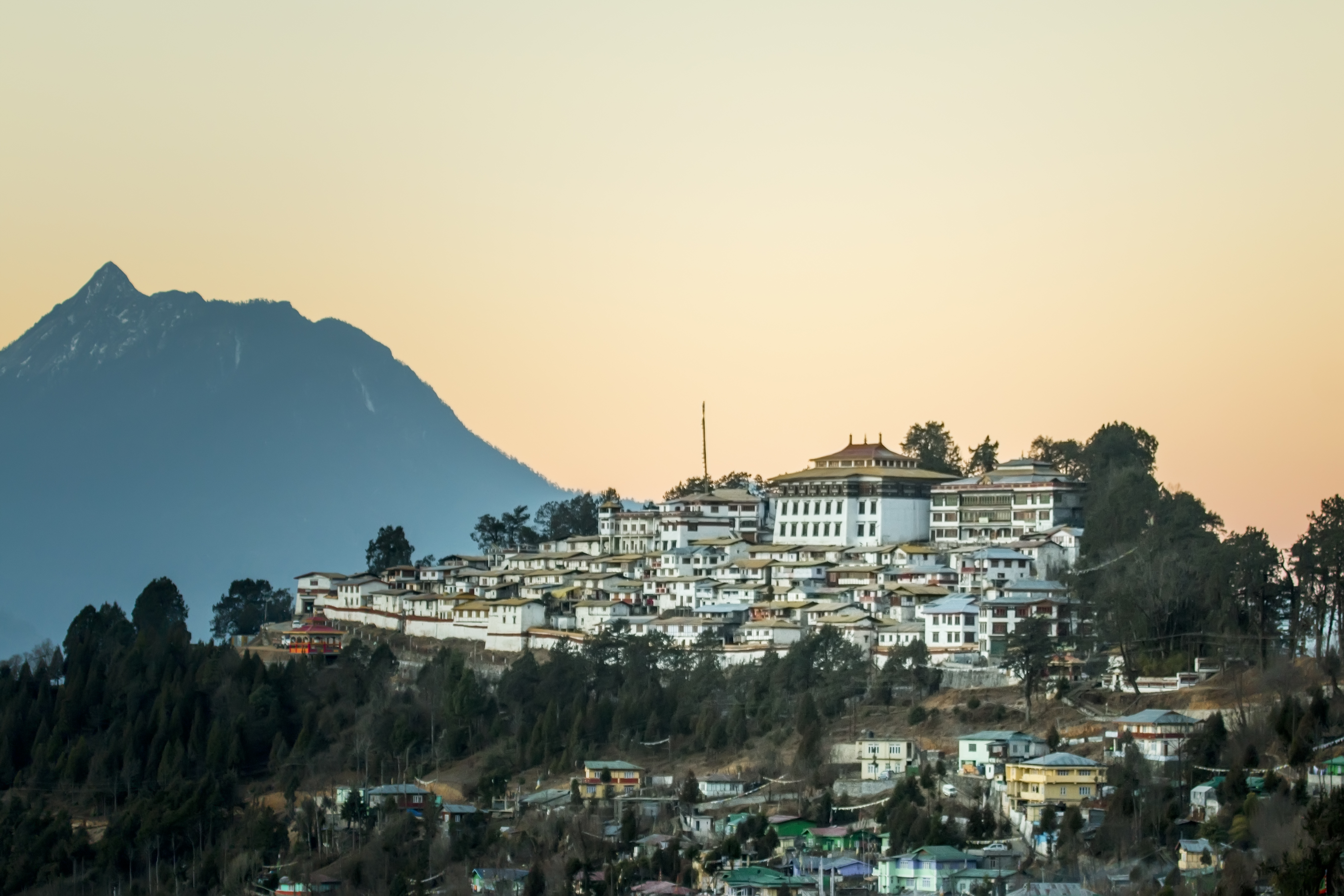
Tawang Monastery in Arunachal Pradesh, was built in the 1600s, is the largest monastery in India and second largest in the world after the Potala Palace in Lhasa, Tibet.

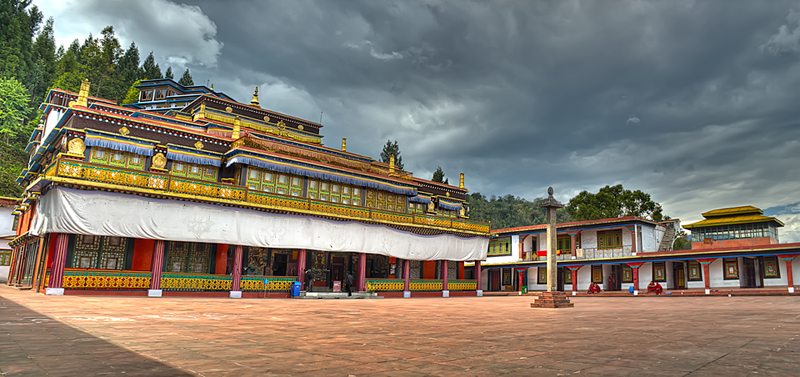
Rumtek Monastery in Sikkim was built under the direction of Changchub Dorje, 12th Karmapa Lama in the mid-1700s.

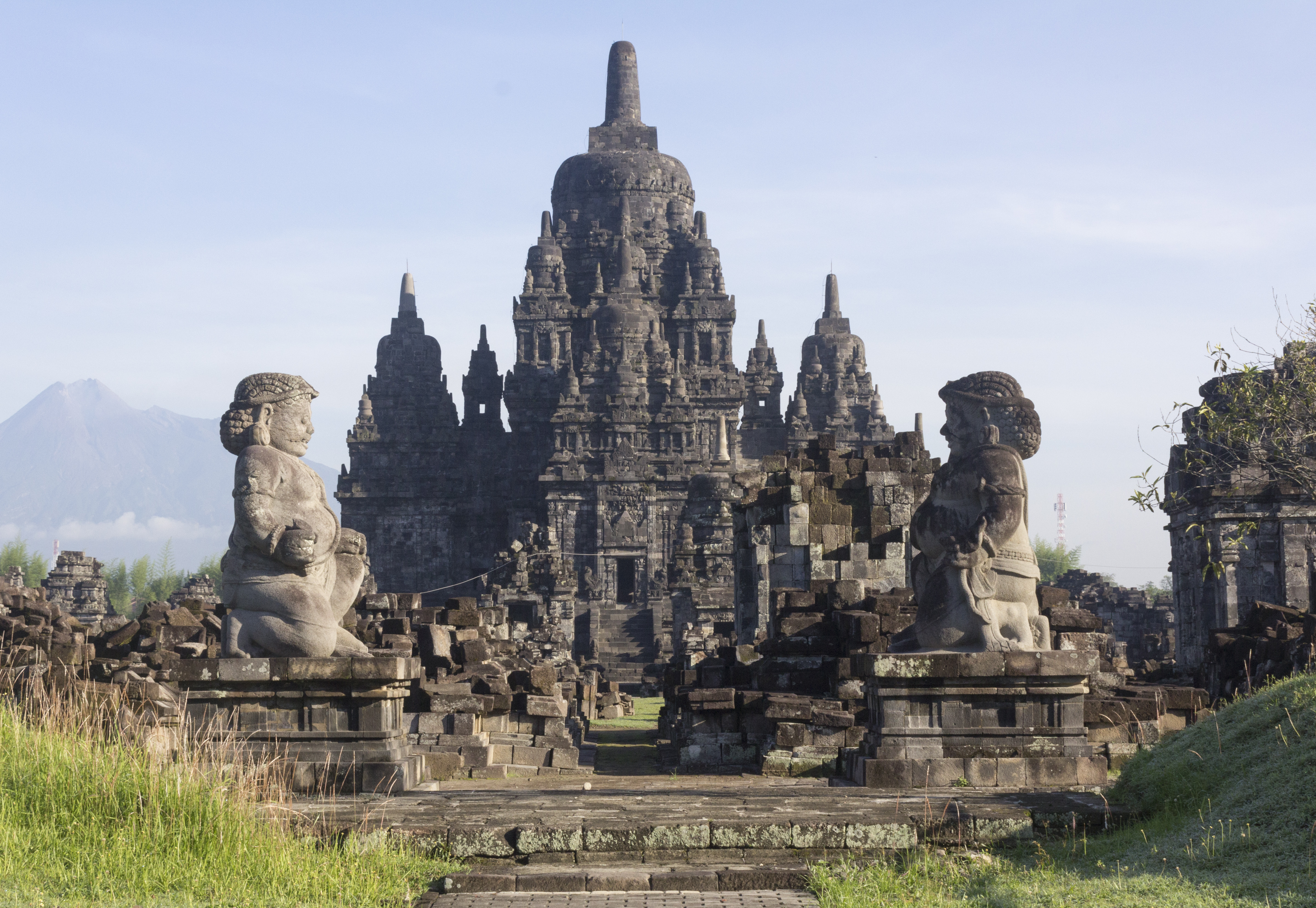
The Sewu temple compound, second largest Buddhist temple complex in Indonesia.

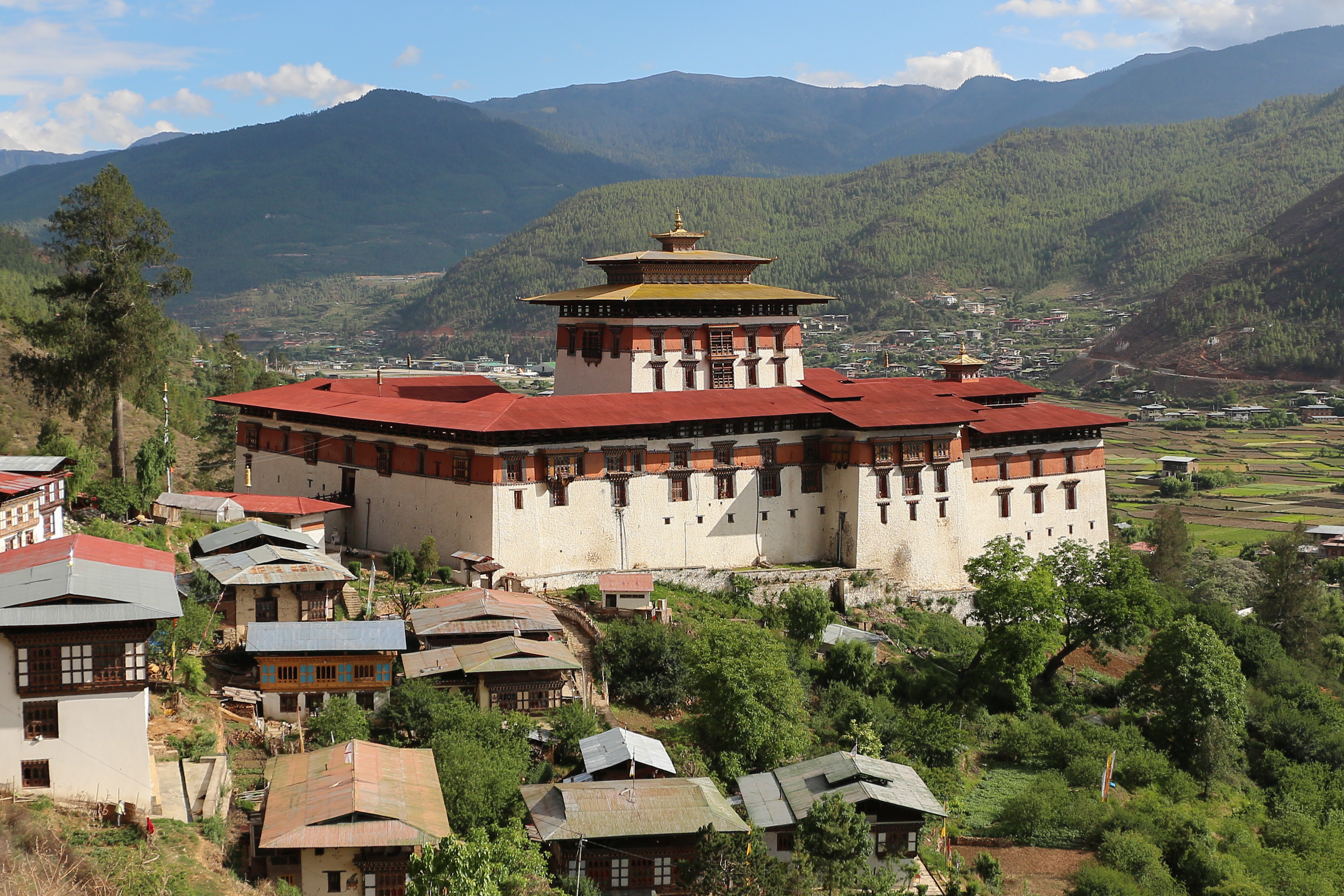
The Rinpung Dzong follows a distinctive type of fortress architecture found in the former and present Buddhist kingdoms of the Himalayas, most notably Bhutan.

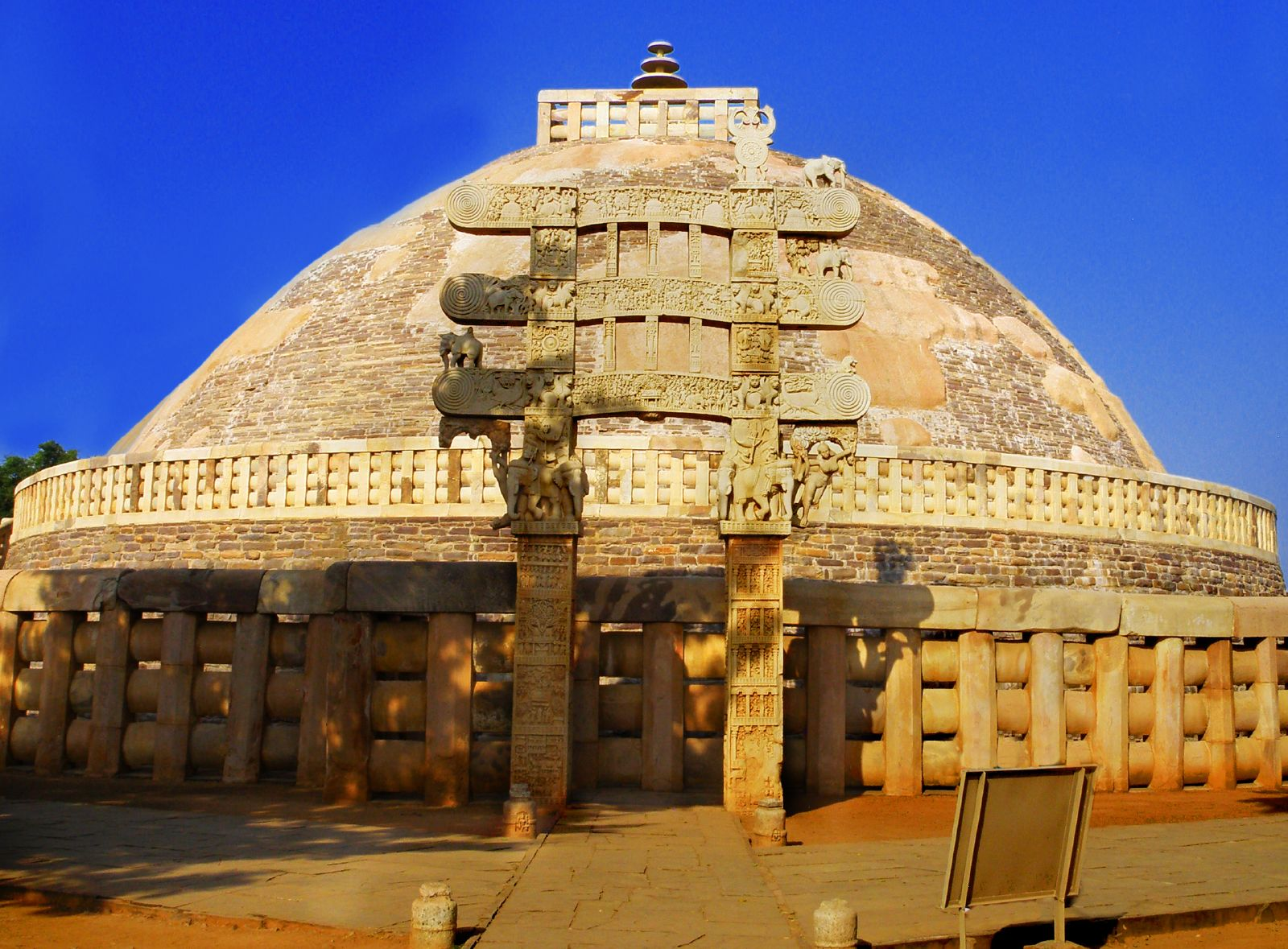
The Great Stupa in Sanchi, India is considered a cornerstone of Buddhist architecture.

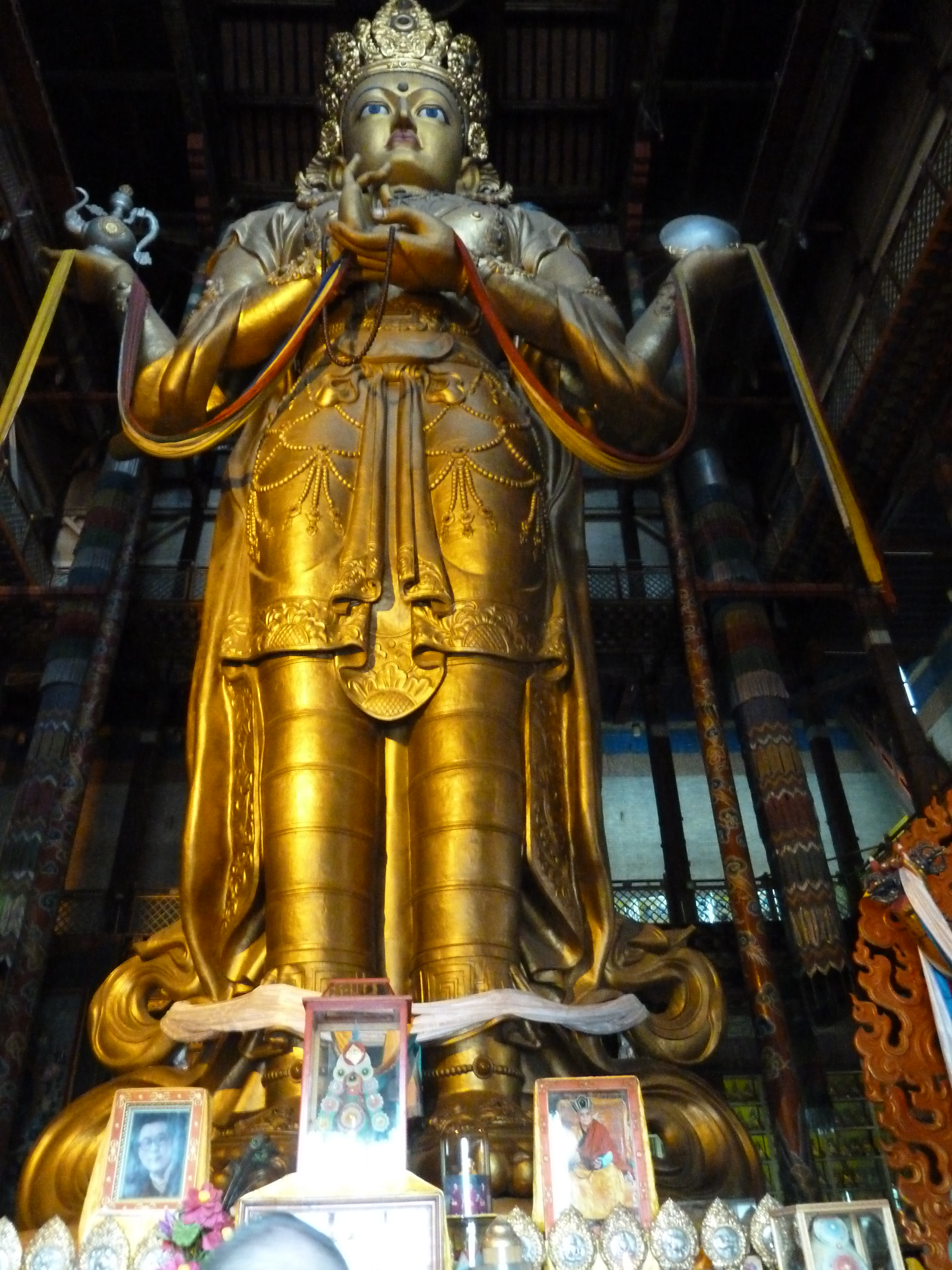
Mongolian statue of Avalokiteśvara (Mongolian name: Migjid Janraisig), Gandantegchinlen Monastery. Tallest indoor statue in the world, 26.5-meter-high, 1996 rebuilt, (1913)

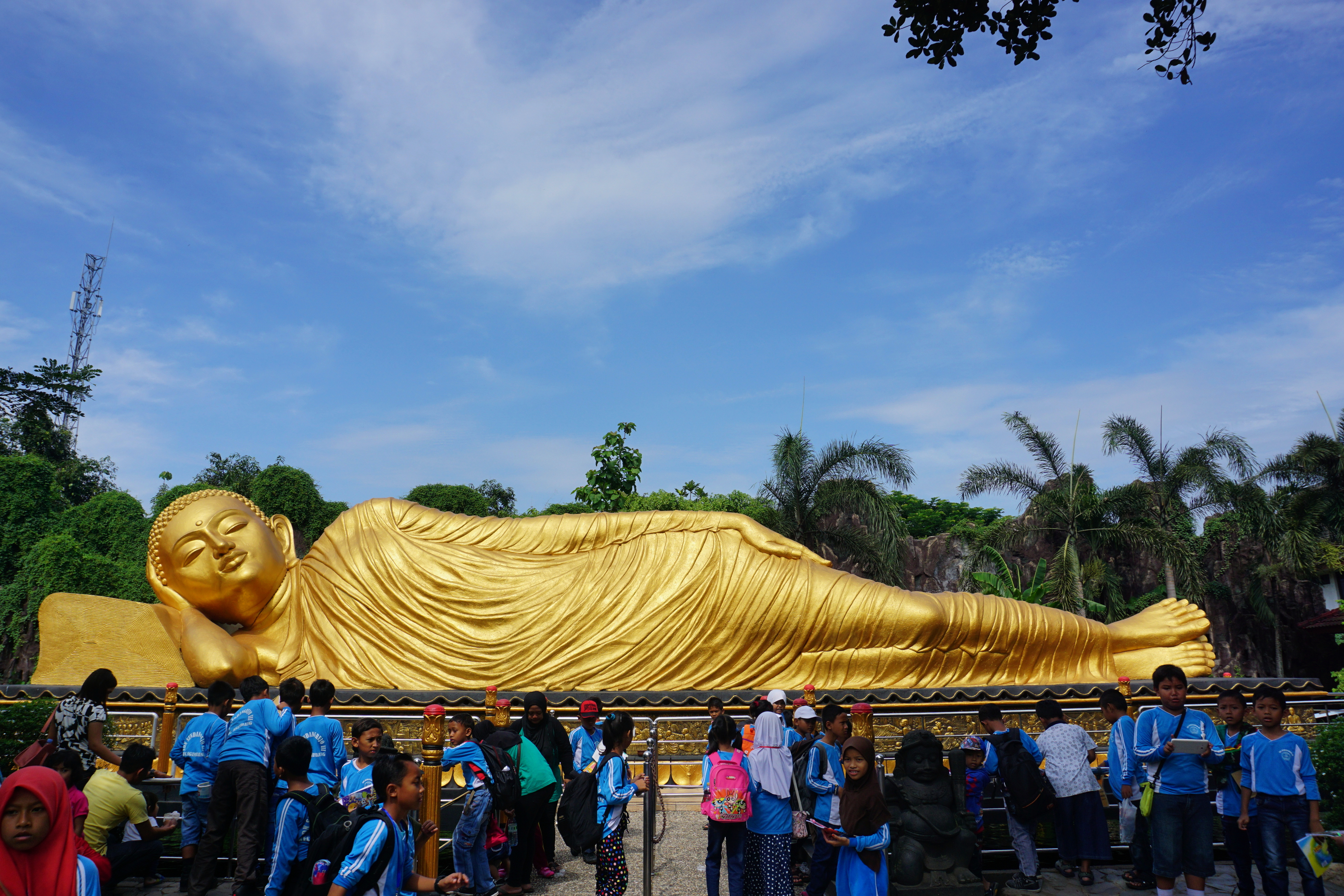
Reclining Buddha statue, this is the largest Buddha statue in Indonesia and Southeast Asia.

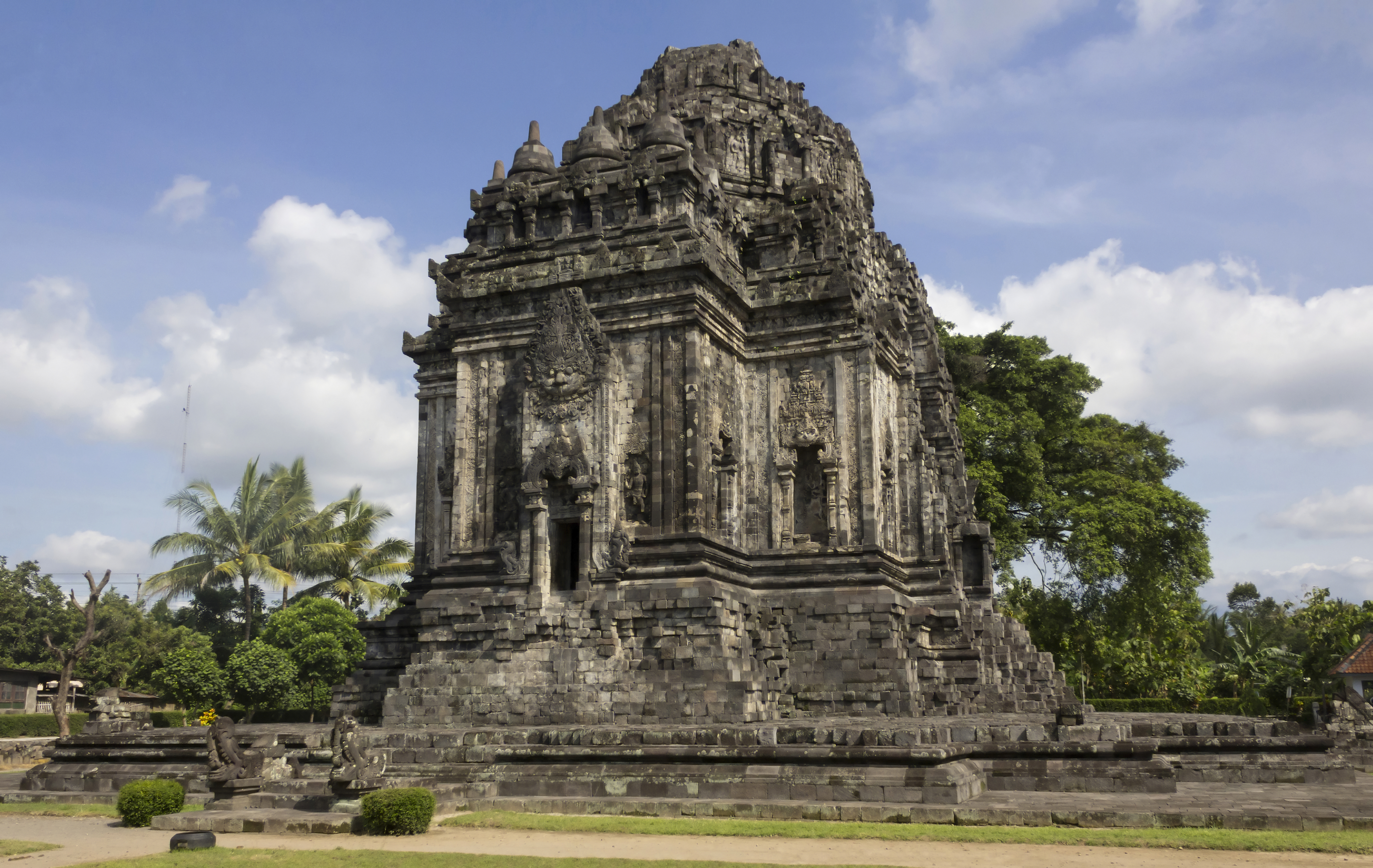
Kalasan, 8th-century Buddhist temple in Java island.

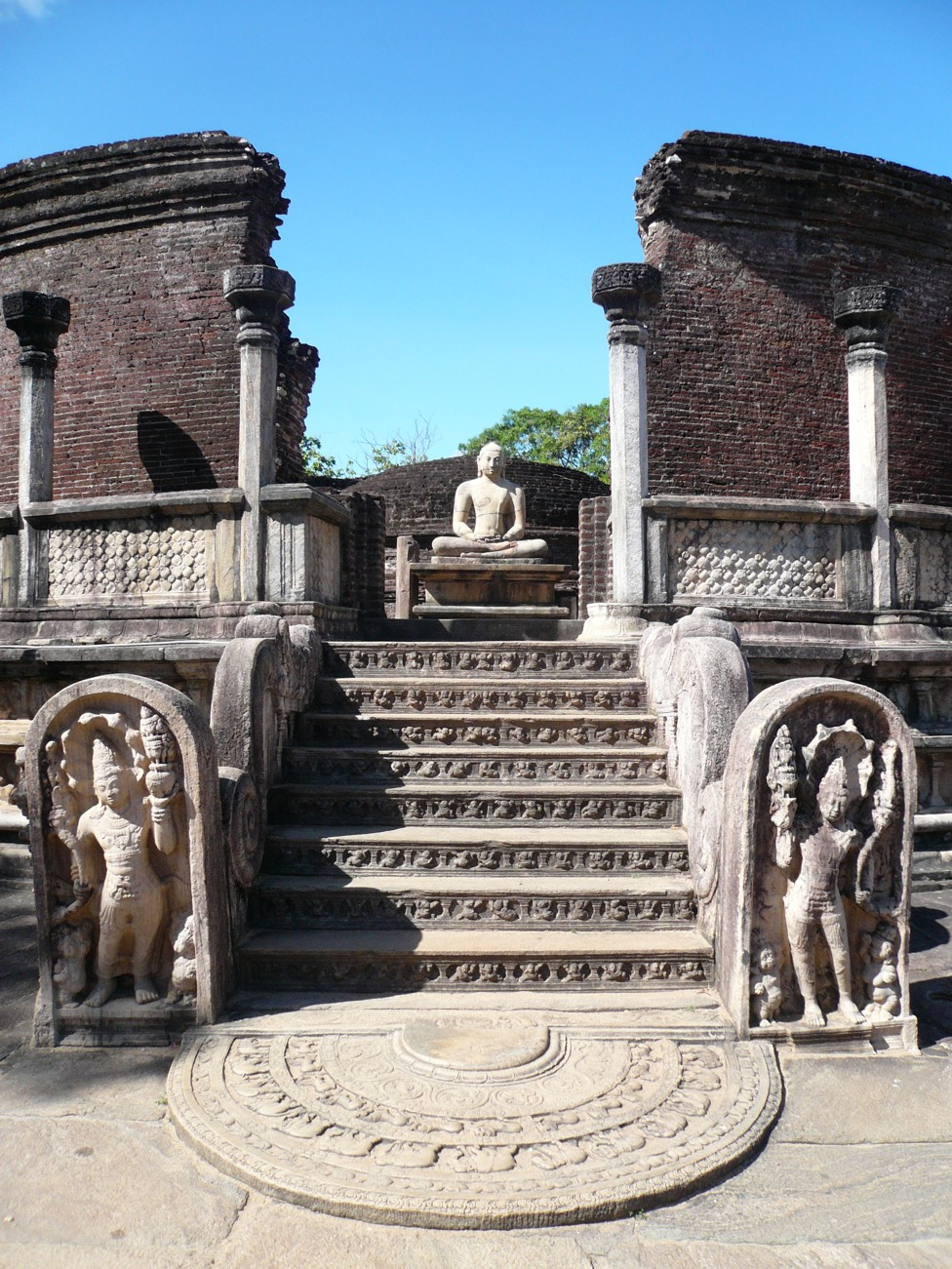
Vatadage Temple, in Polonnaruwa, is a uniquely Sri Lankan circular shrine enclosing a small dagoba. The vatadage has a three-tiered conical roof, spanning a height of 40–50 feet, without a center post, and supported by pillars of diminishing height.

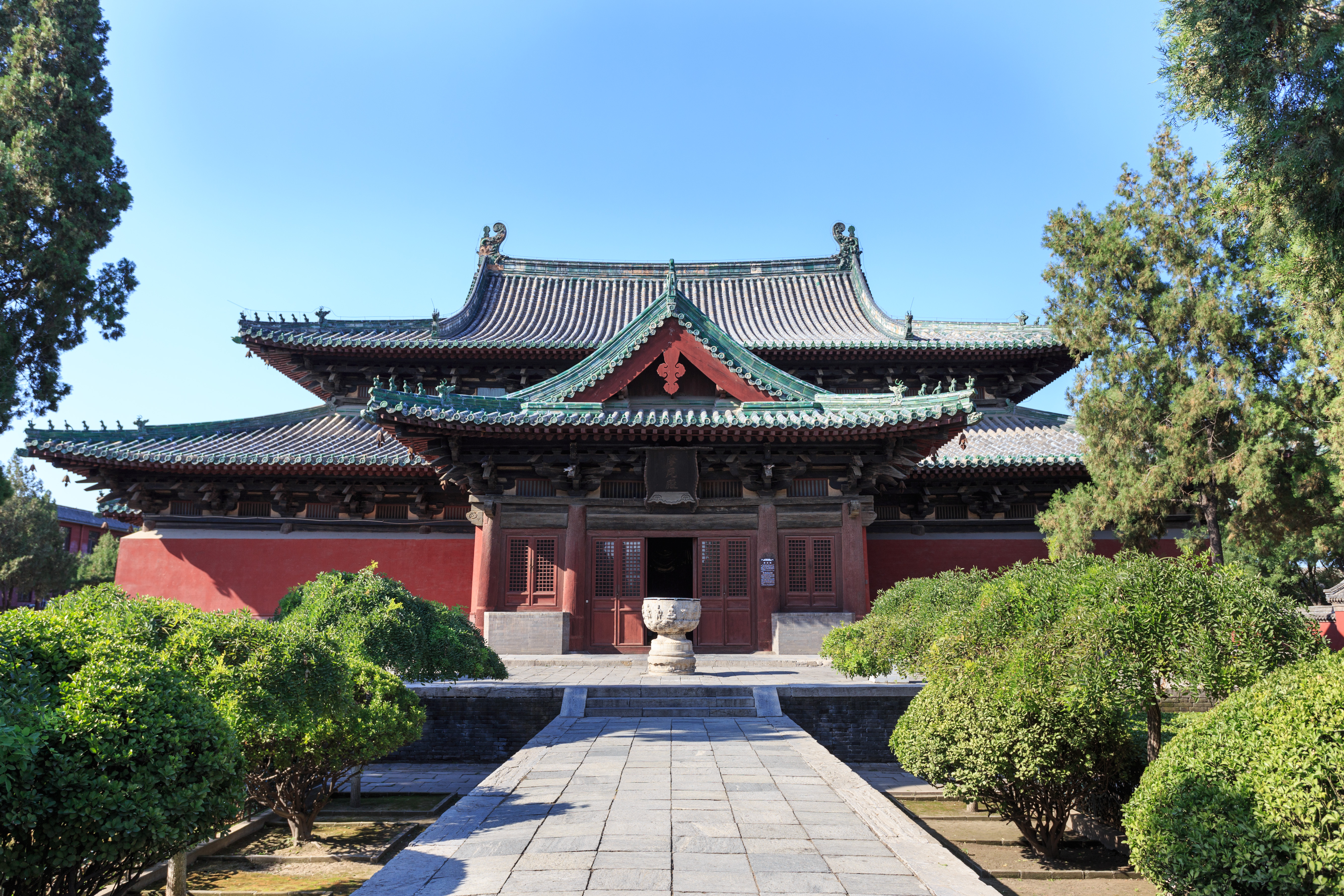
The Mani Hall of the Longxing Temple, Hebei, China.

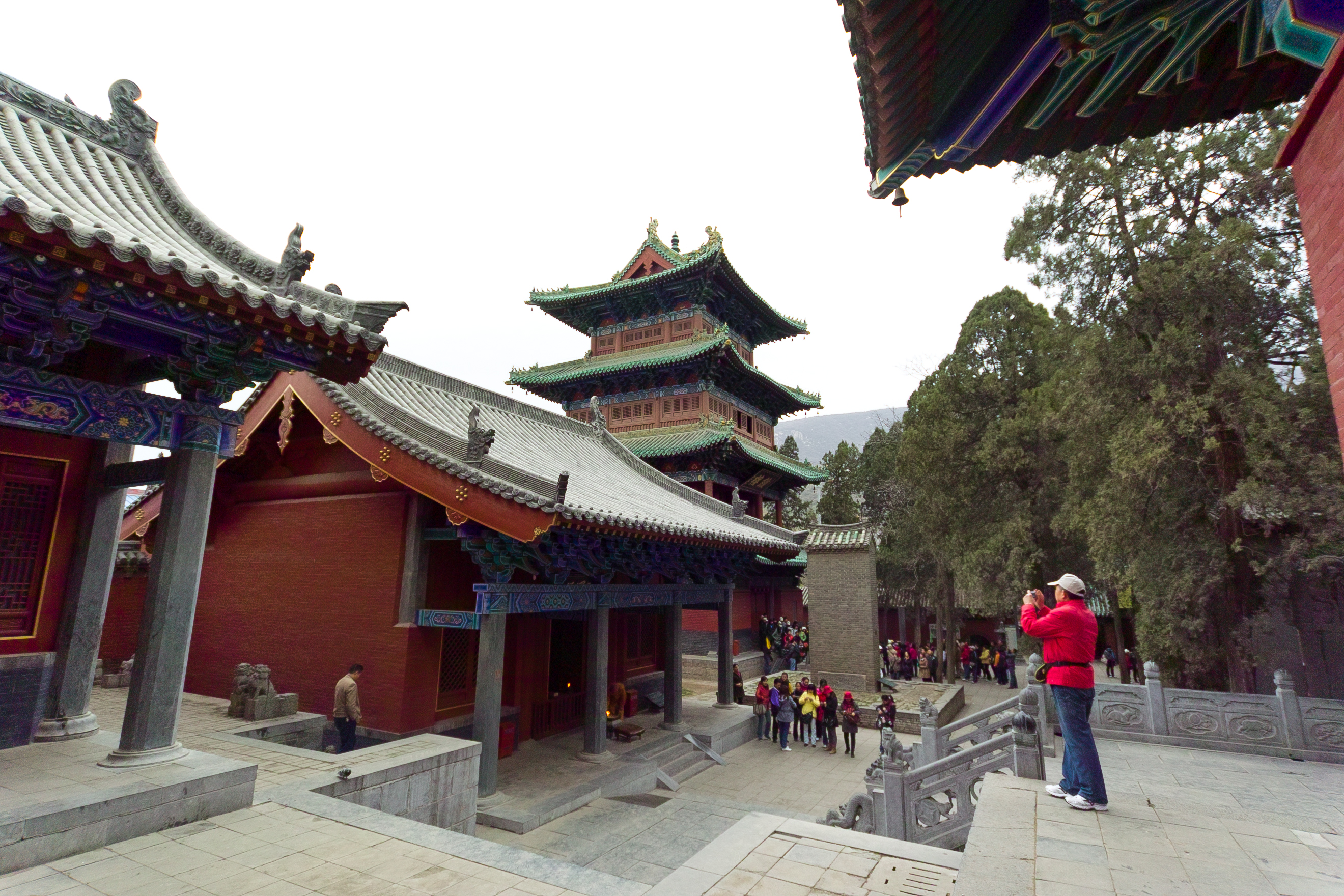
Shaolin Monastery complex and bell tower, Mount Song, Henan, China.

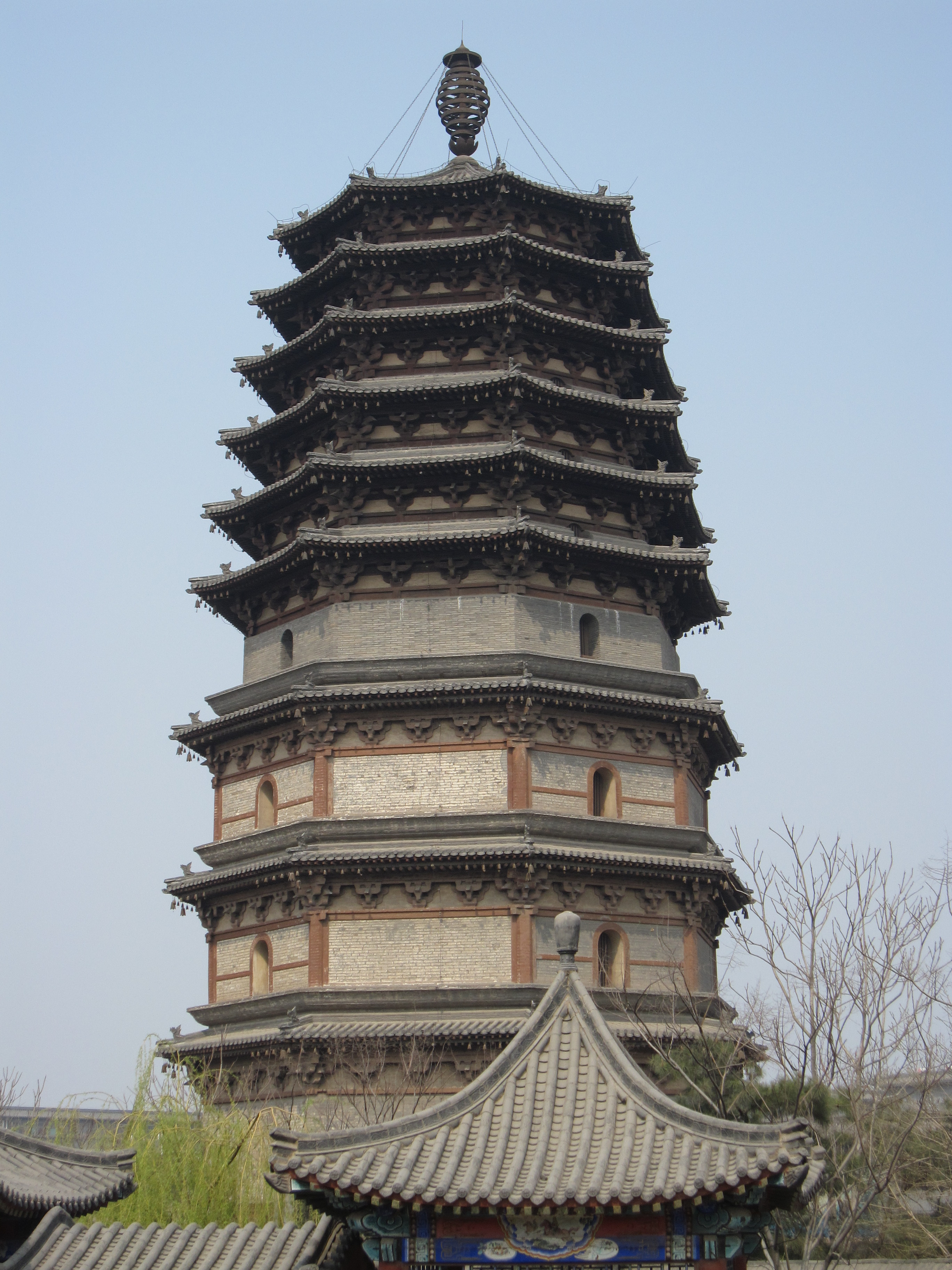
Lingxiao Pagoda in Zhengding, Hebei, China.

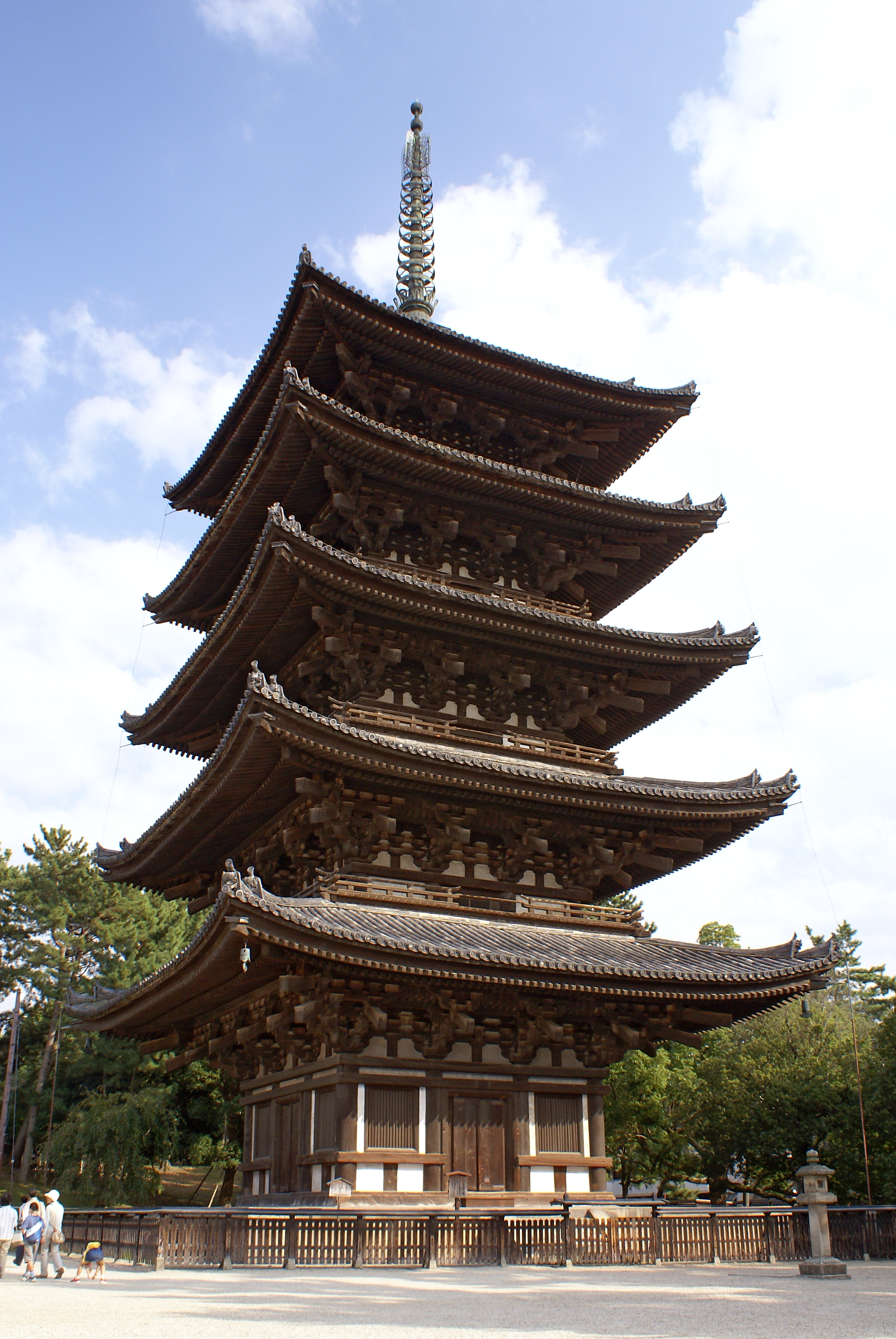
Pagoda of Kofukuji, Nara, Japan.

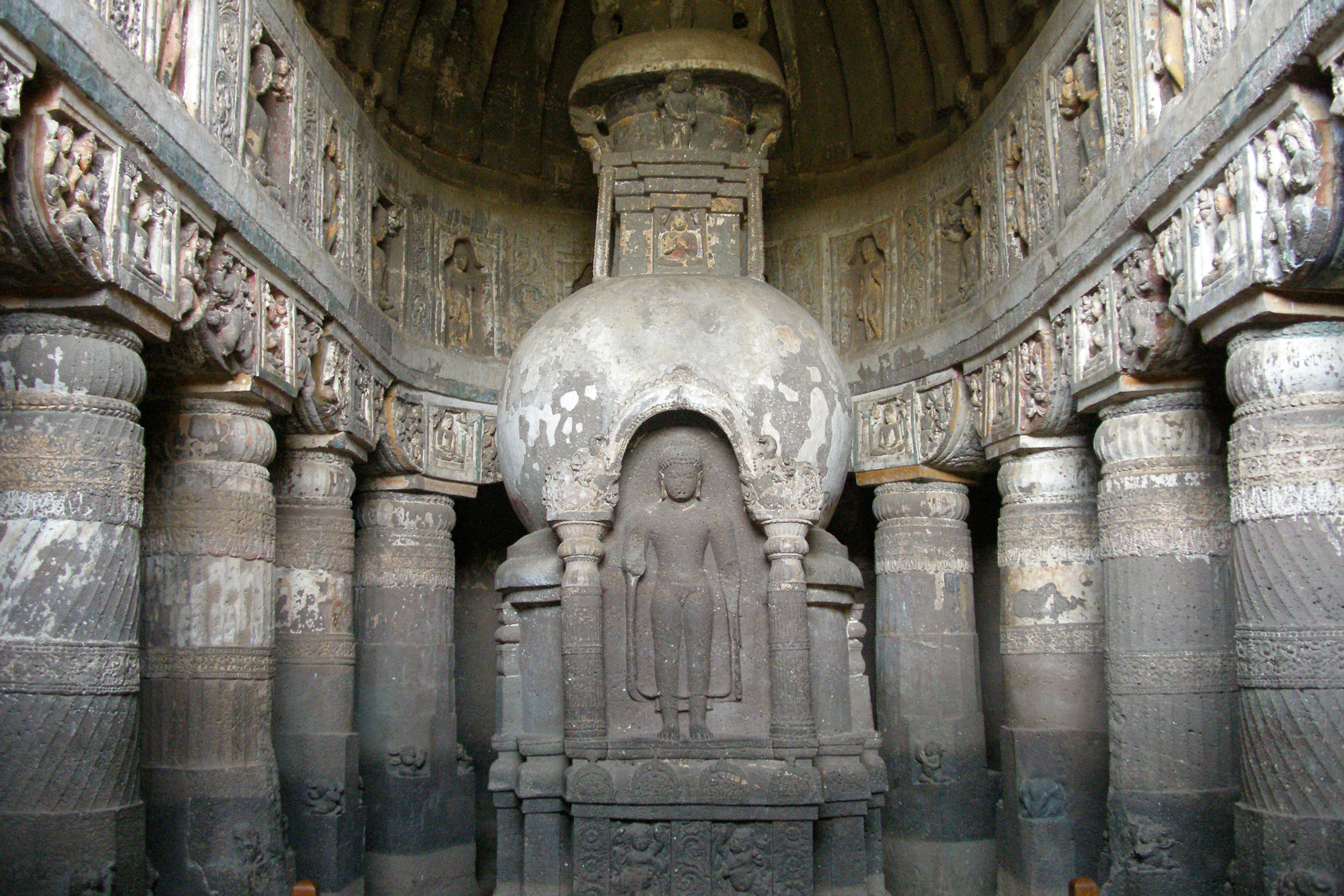
Ajanta Caves cave with chaitya, India.

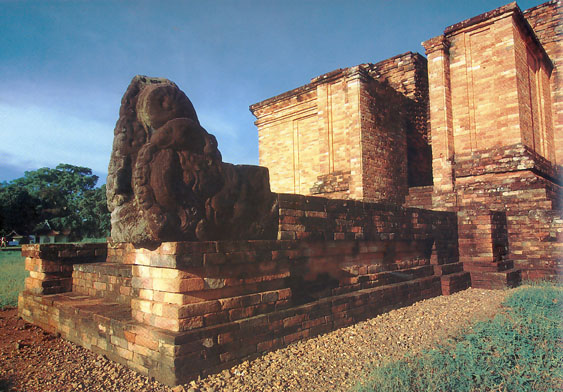
Candi Gumpung, a Buddhist temple at Muaro Jambi of Malayu Kingdom.

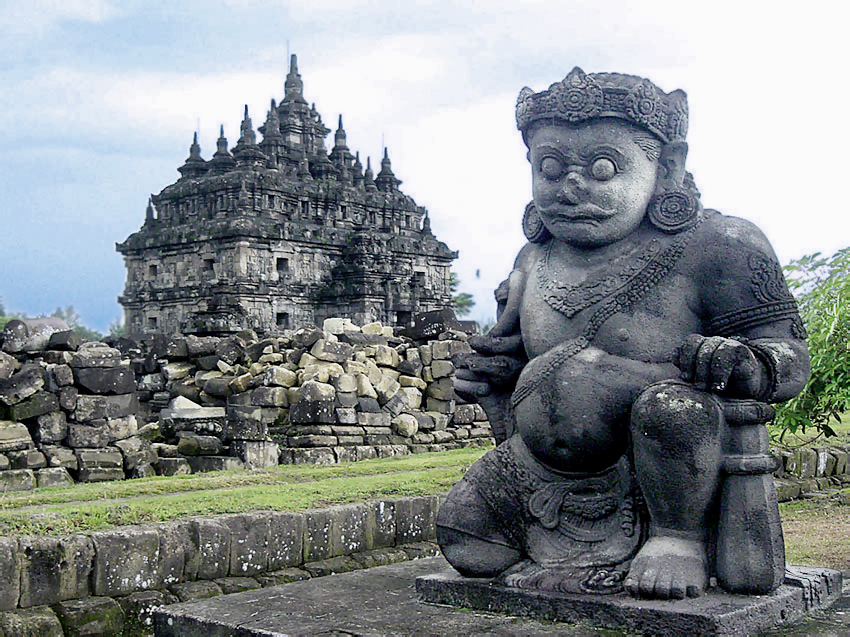
Plaosan temple

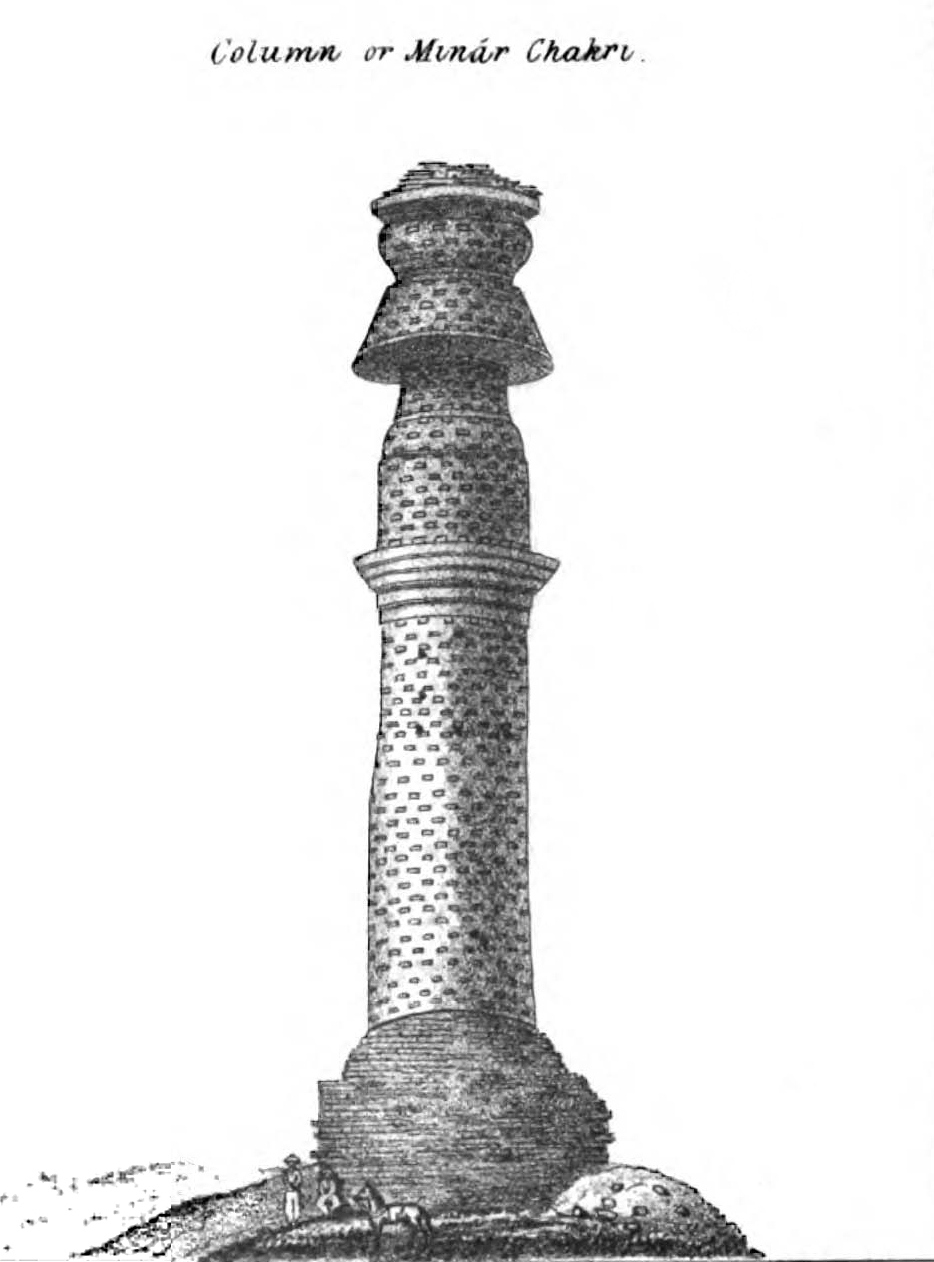
Minar-i Chakri in 1836, Afghanistan

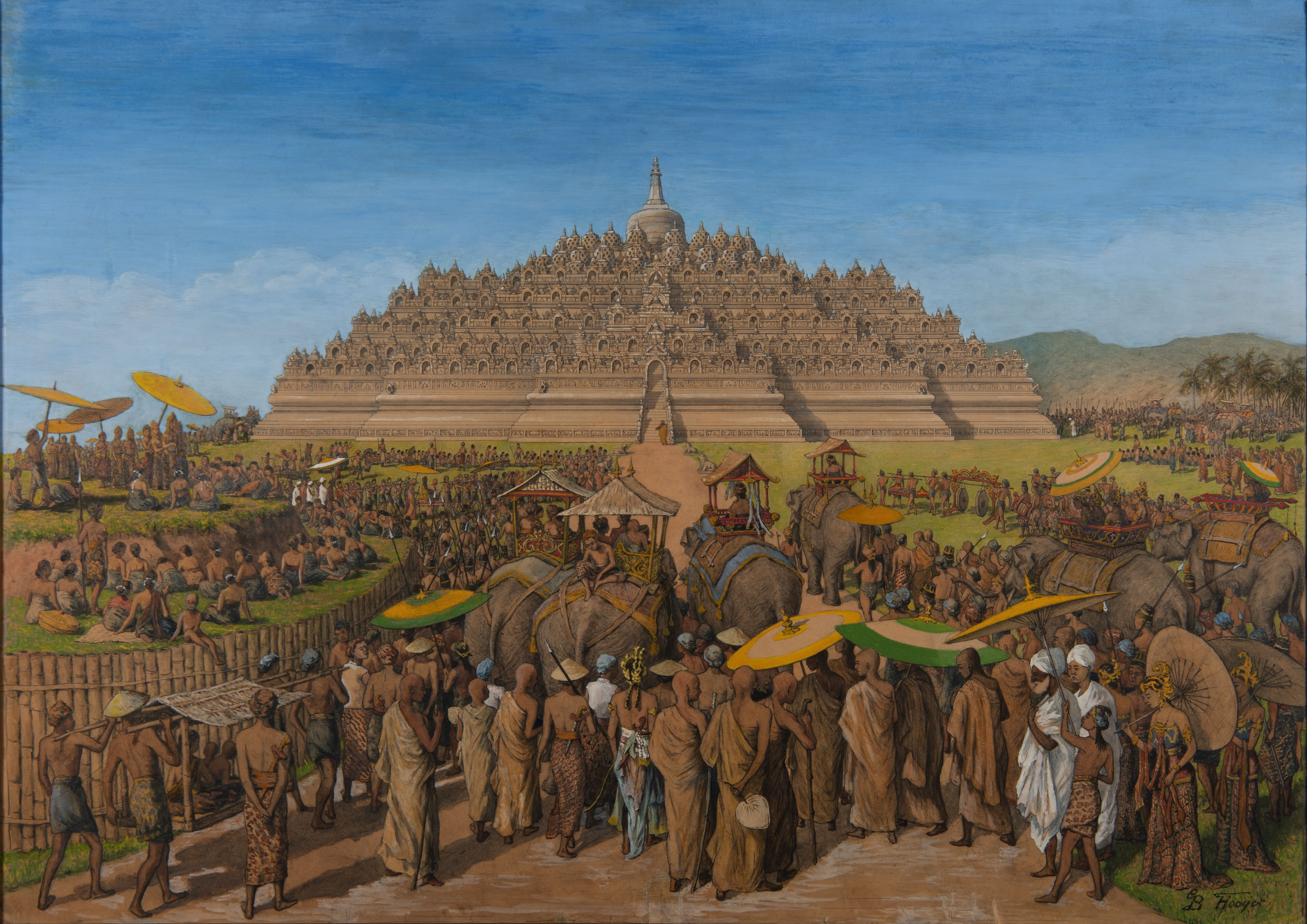
A painting by G.B. Hooijer (c. 1916–1919) reconstructing the scene of Borobudur during its heyday

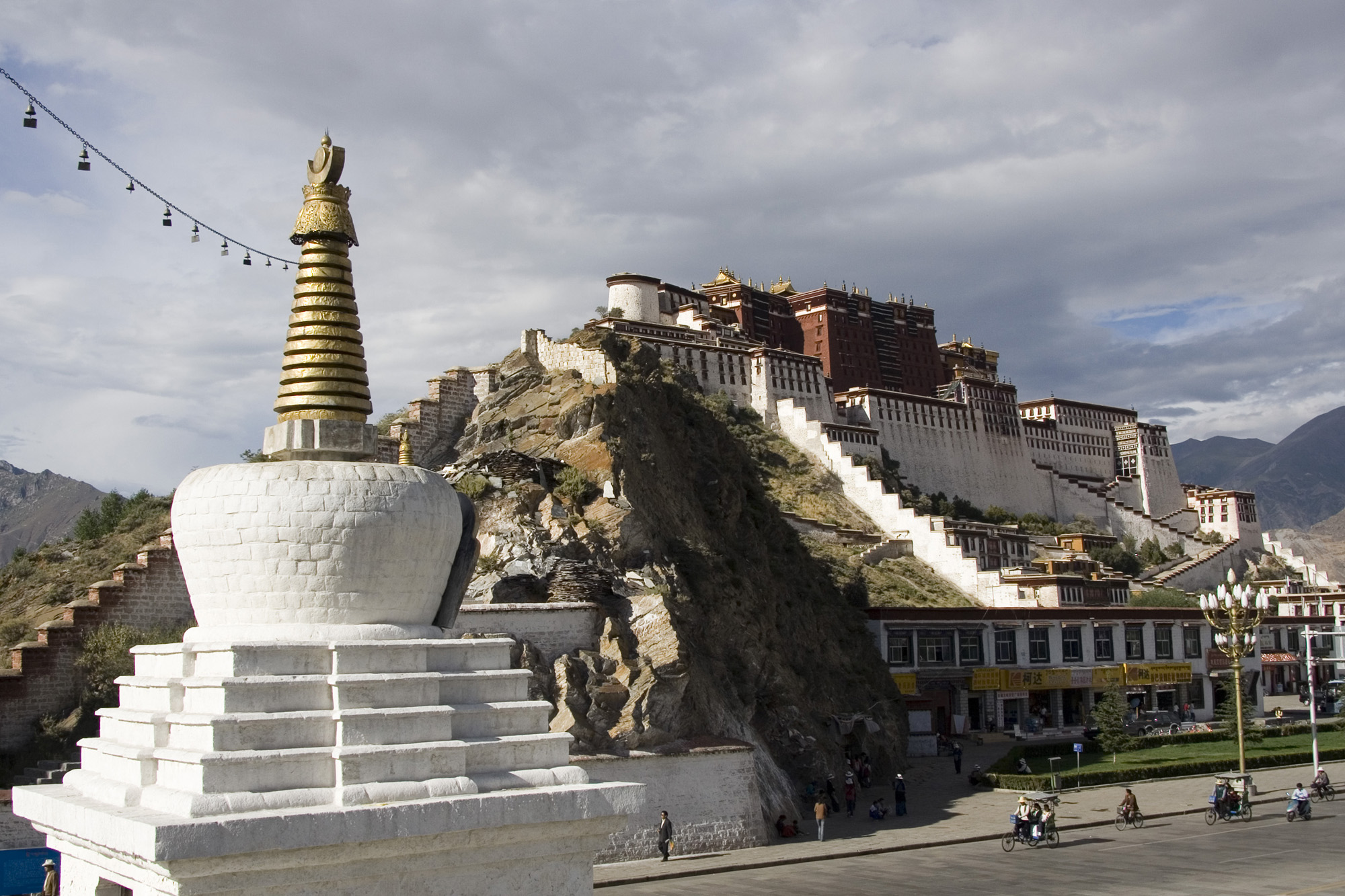
Stupa near Potala Palace, Lhasa, Tibet.

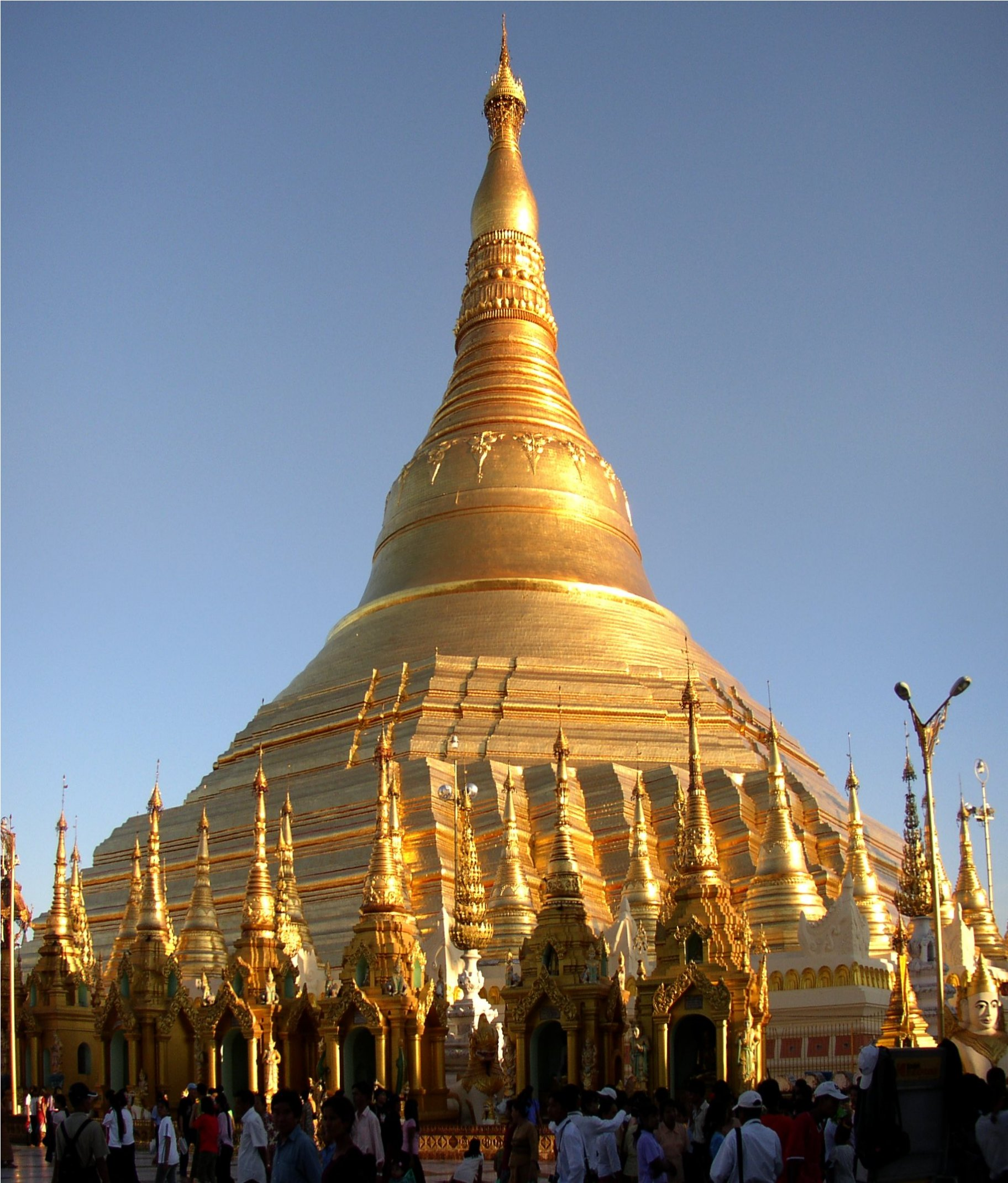
Shwedagon Pagoda, Myanmar

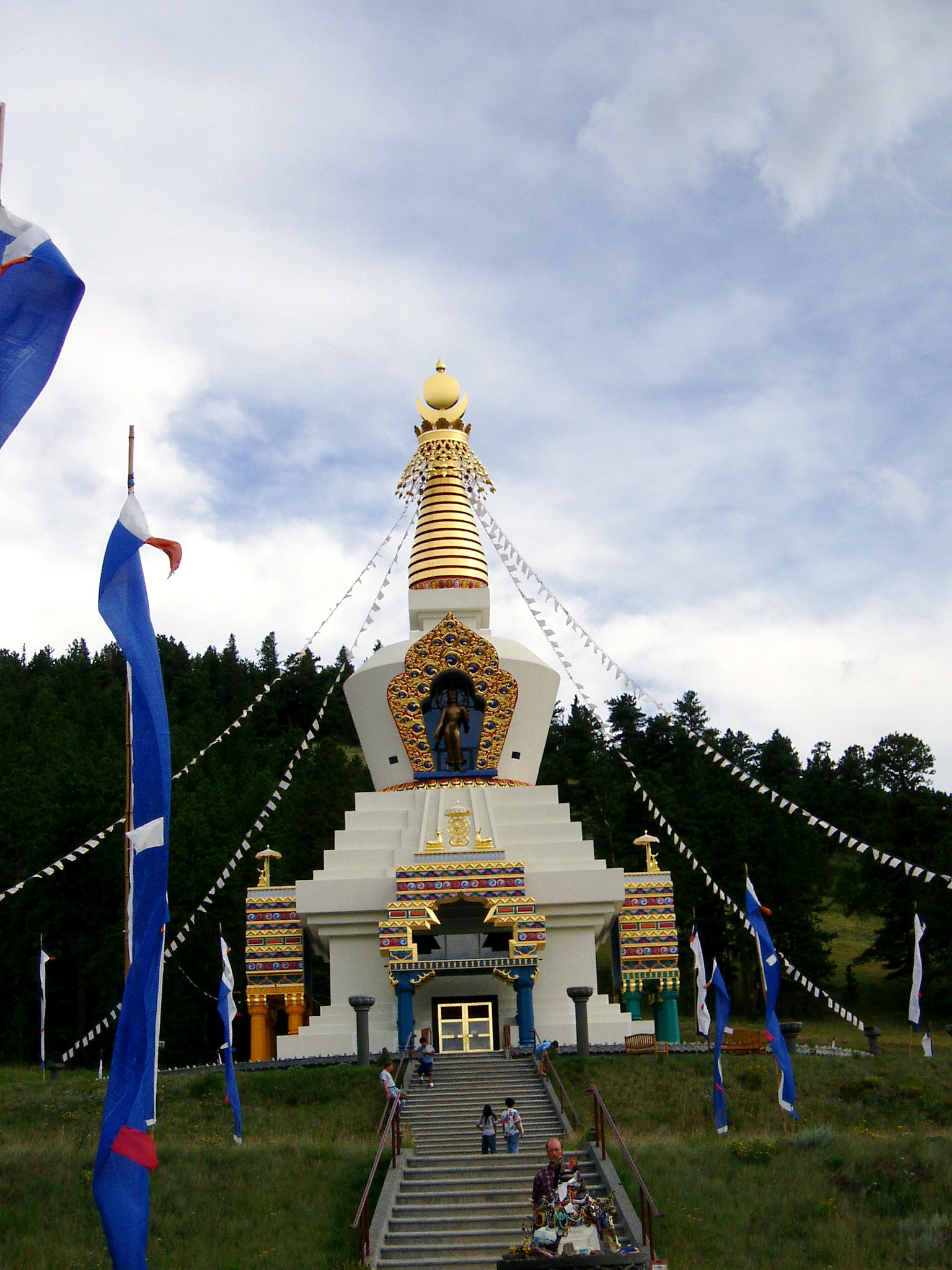
Great Stupa at Drala Mountain Center, United States

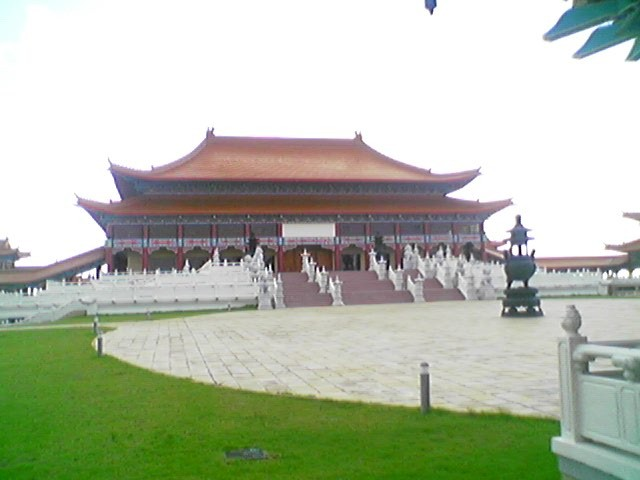
Nan Hua Main Temple, South Africa

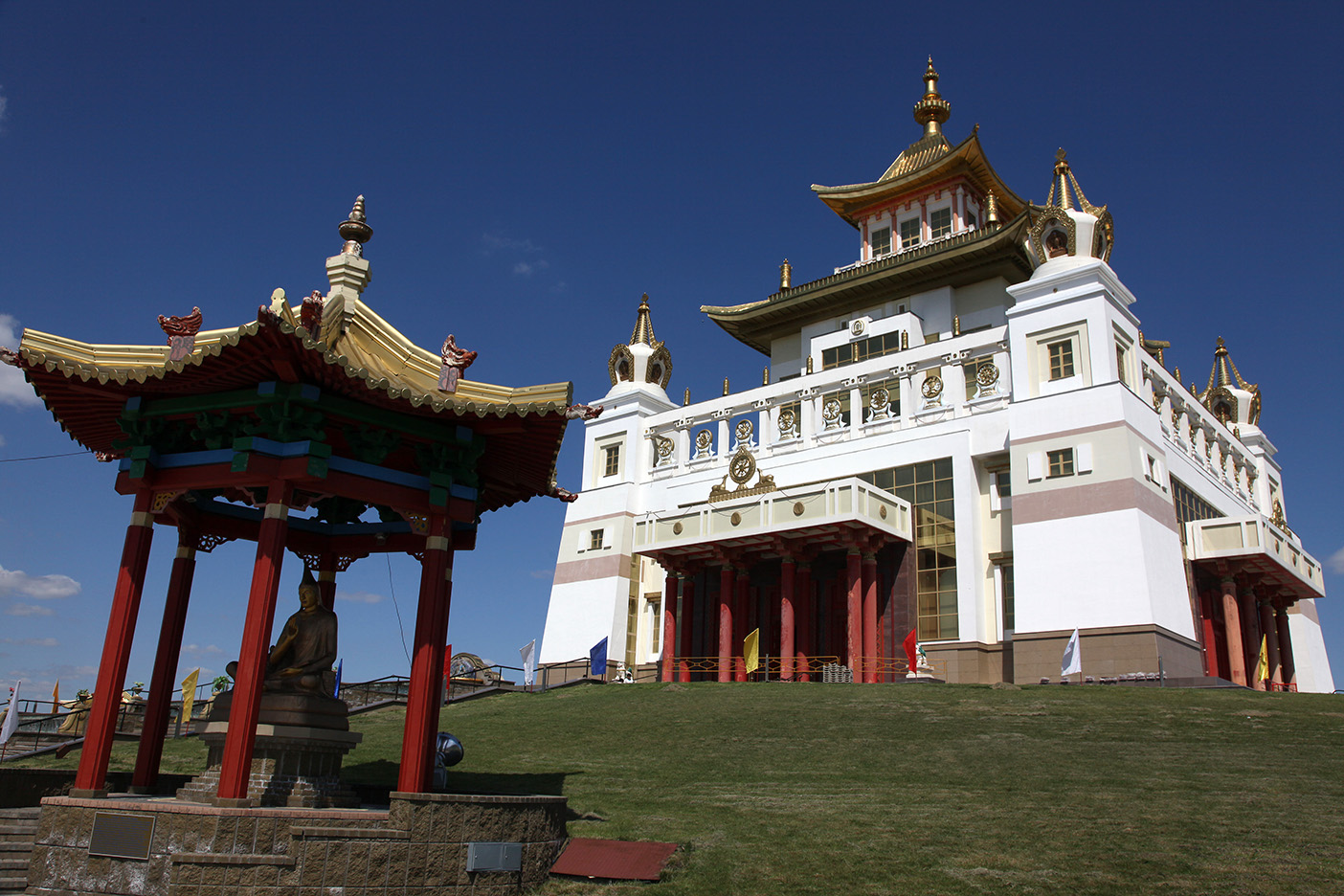
Golden Temple of Shakyamuni Buddha, Kalmykia, Russia

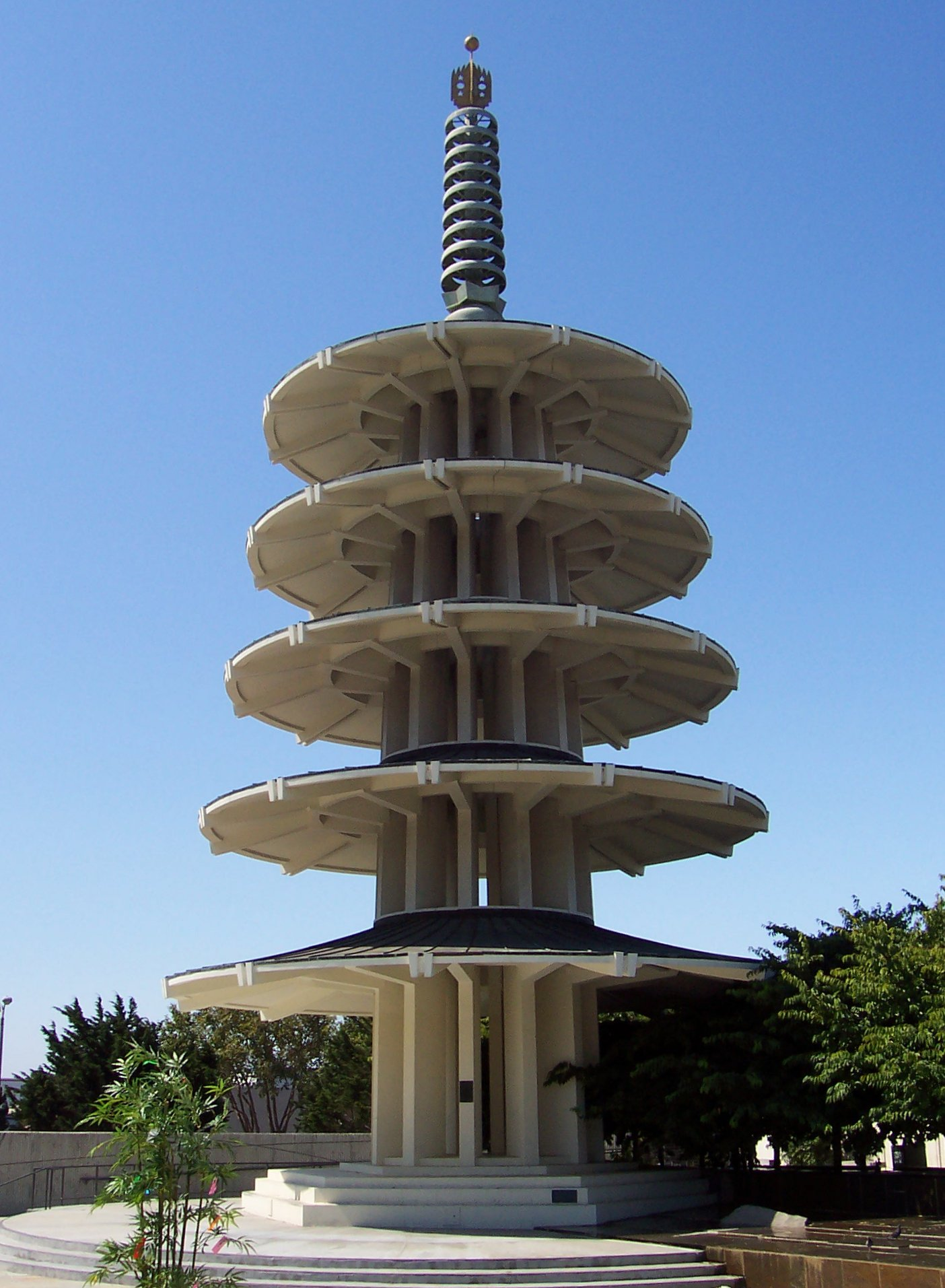
The five-tiered Peace Pagoda Japantown, San Francisco

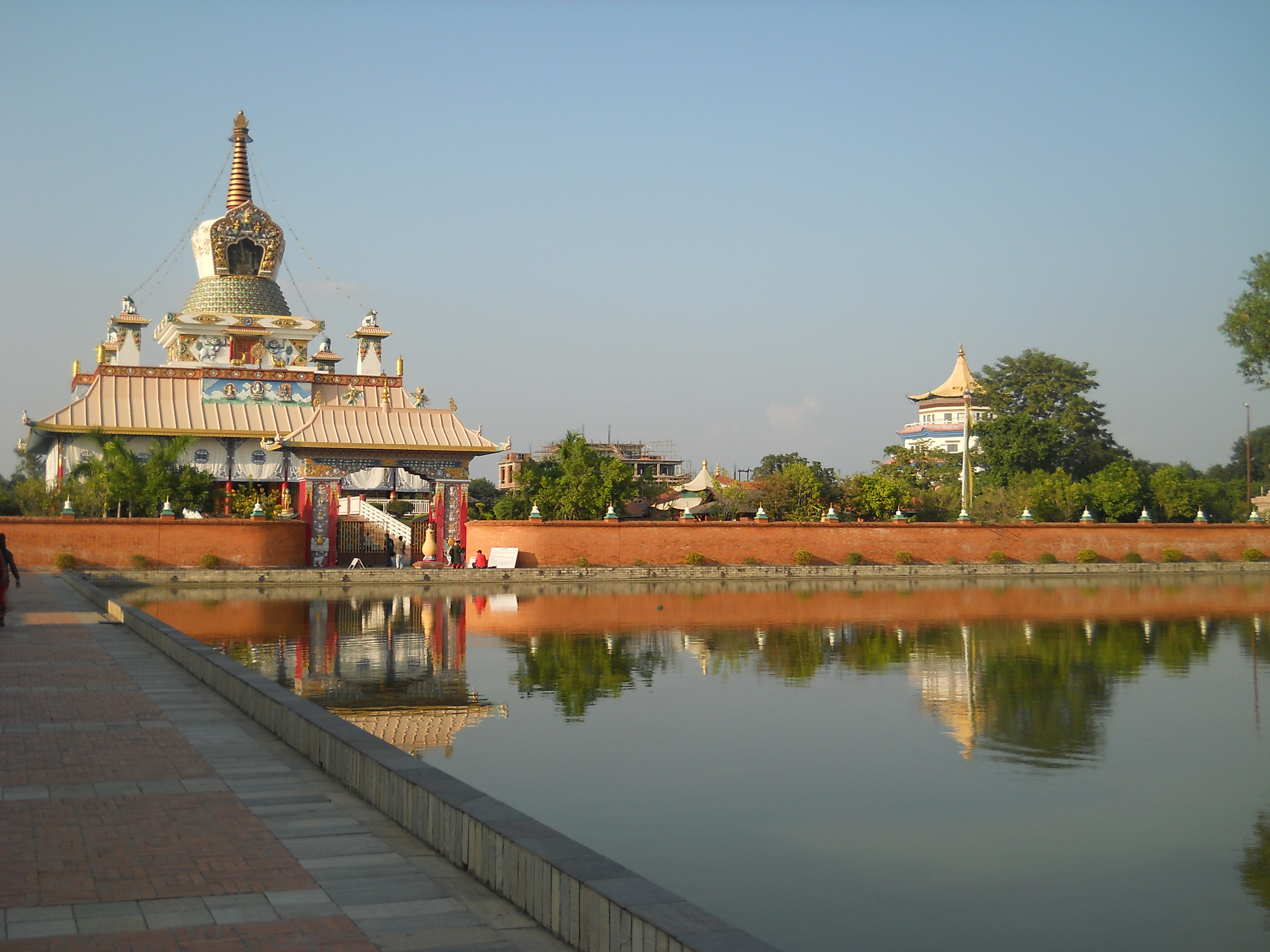
The Great Drigung Kagyud Lotus Stupa in Lumbini, Nepal

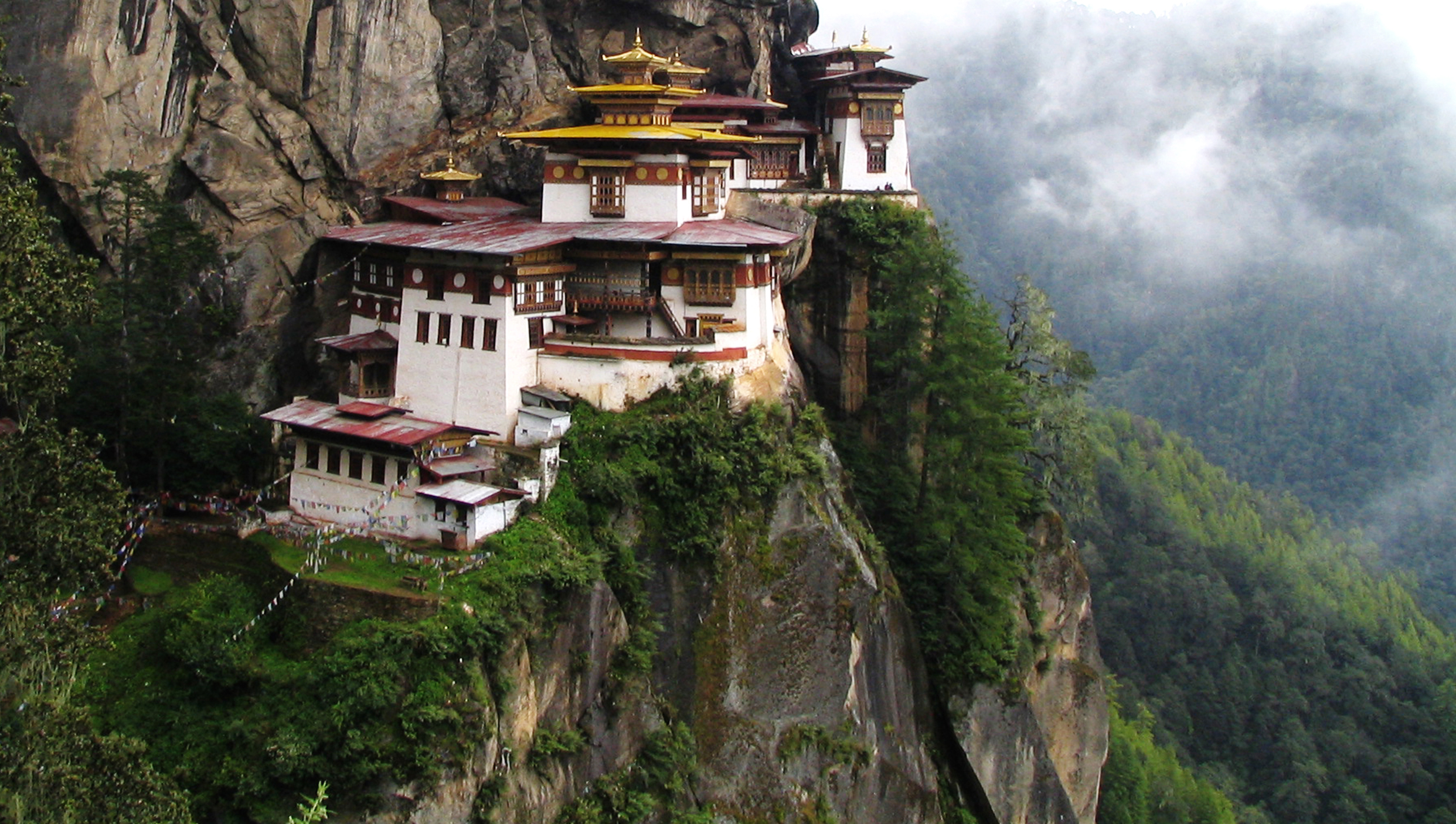
Paro Taktsang, Paro, Bhutan

== See also ==
- Burmese pagoda
- Candi of Indonesia
- Cetiya
- Chaitya
- Ho trai
- Kyaung
- List of Buddhist temples
- Ordination hall
- Pagoda festival
- Relics associated with Buddha
- Sala kan parian
- Stupa
- Thai temple art and architecture
- Vihāra
- Wat

== Sources ==
- Fletcher, Sir Banister; Cruickshank, Dan (1996) [1896]. Sir Banister Fletcher's a history of architecture (20th illustrated ed.). Architectural Press. ISBN 0-7506-2267-9.
- Fujita Masaya, Koga Shūsaku, ed. (April 10, 1990). Nihon Kenchiku-shi (in Japanese) (September 30, 2008 ed.). Shōwa-dō. ISBN 4-8122-9805-9.
