= Giriyak Stupa =

Gupta-era stupa in Bihar, India

Giriyak Stupa गिरियक स्तूप (in Hindi)
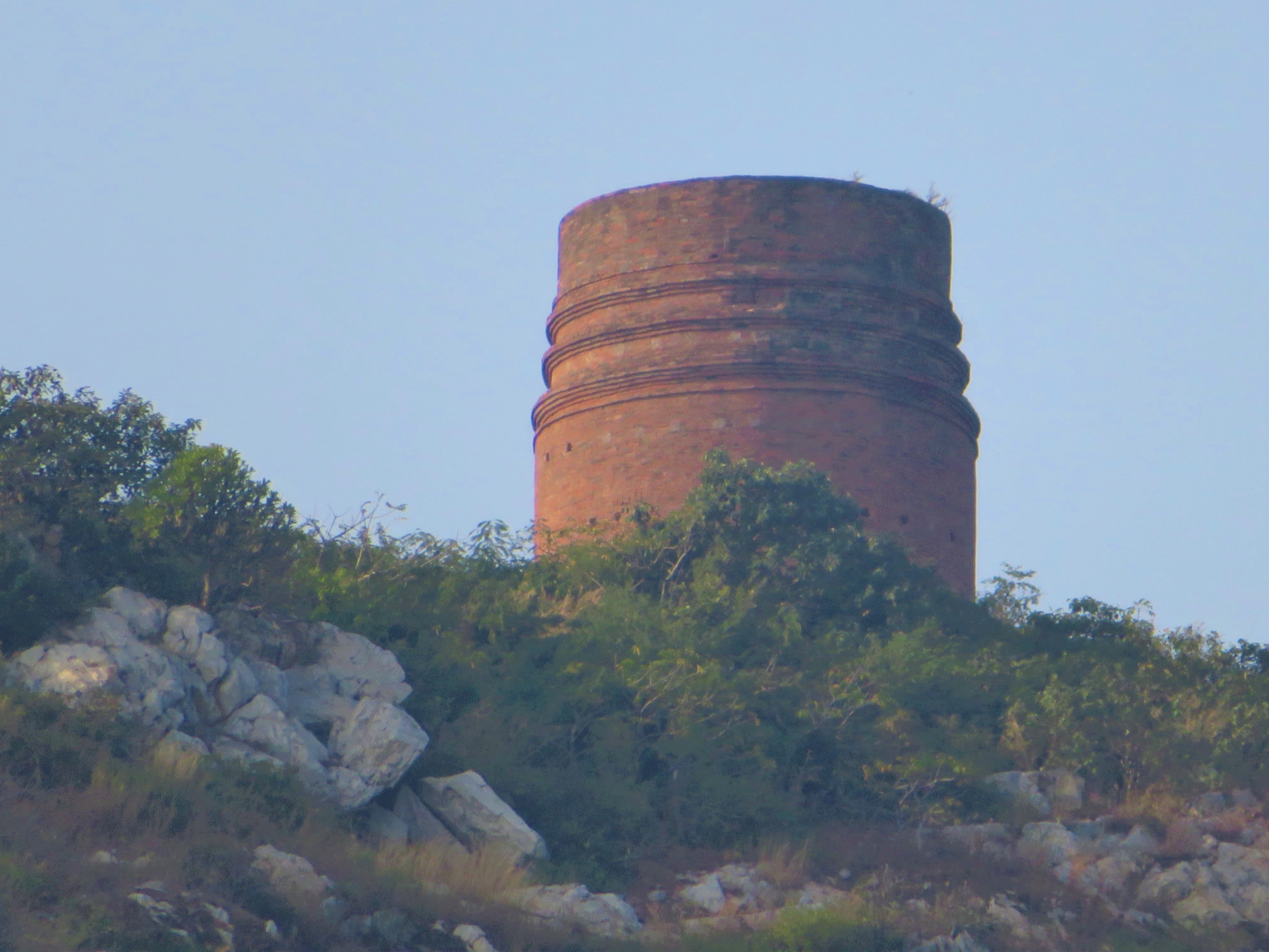
- The stupa in 2022, after extensive restoration by the Archaeological Survey of India

- Location in Bihar, India Giriyak Stupa (Bihar)

Religion
- Affiliation: Buddhism
- Sect: Theravada Buddhism
- Status: Preserved

Location
- Location: Giriyak, Nalanda, Bihar, India
- Interactive map of Giriyak Stupa गिरियक स्तूप (in Hindi)
- Administration: Archaeological Survey of India
- Coordinates: 25°01′30″N 85°30′47″E

Architecture
- Type: Stupa
- Style: Buddhist, Gupta
- Completed: c. 400 - 500 CE

Specifications
- Height (max): 9 metres (30 feet)
- Materials: brick

Giriyak Stupa, also known as Jarasandha-ka-baithak (Jarasandha's Throne), is an ancient cylindrical stupa located in the Nalanda district of Bihar, India.

== Location ==
Giriyak Stupa is located in the Rajgir Hills in Nalanda district of Bihar, India. It is situated on the western side of the Panchane River, opposite the village of Giriyak.

== Name ==
Giriyak Stupa is also known as Jarasandha-ka-baithak (Jarasandha's Throne). Jarasandha was a legendary king of Magadha. He was the son of a king named Brihadratha.

== Description ==
As it appears today, the stupa is a cylindrical tower, the wall of which is lined with a brickwork veneer. It is 8.5 metres (28 feet) in diameter and 6.5 metres (21 feet) in height, resting on a 4.4 metres (14 feet) high square foundation. When construction of the stupa was completed (about 1500 years ago), there was a solid brick dome atop the cylinder, which in turn was capped with a stone umbrella canopy. Its height at that time — from the bottom of the foundation to the top of the canopy — is estimated to have been at least 16.7 metres (55 feet). The style of ornamentation is of the Gupta period (4th - 6th century CE), similar to that of the Mahabodhi Temple in Bodh Gaya. The ruins of a Gupta-era brick Buddhist temple are located nearby. Other nearby structures are the Mauryan (4th - 2nd century BCE) and Pala (8th - 12th century CE) periods.

== History ==
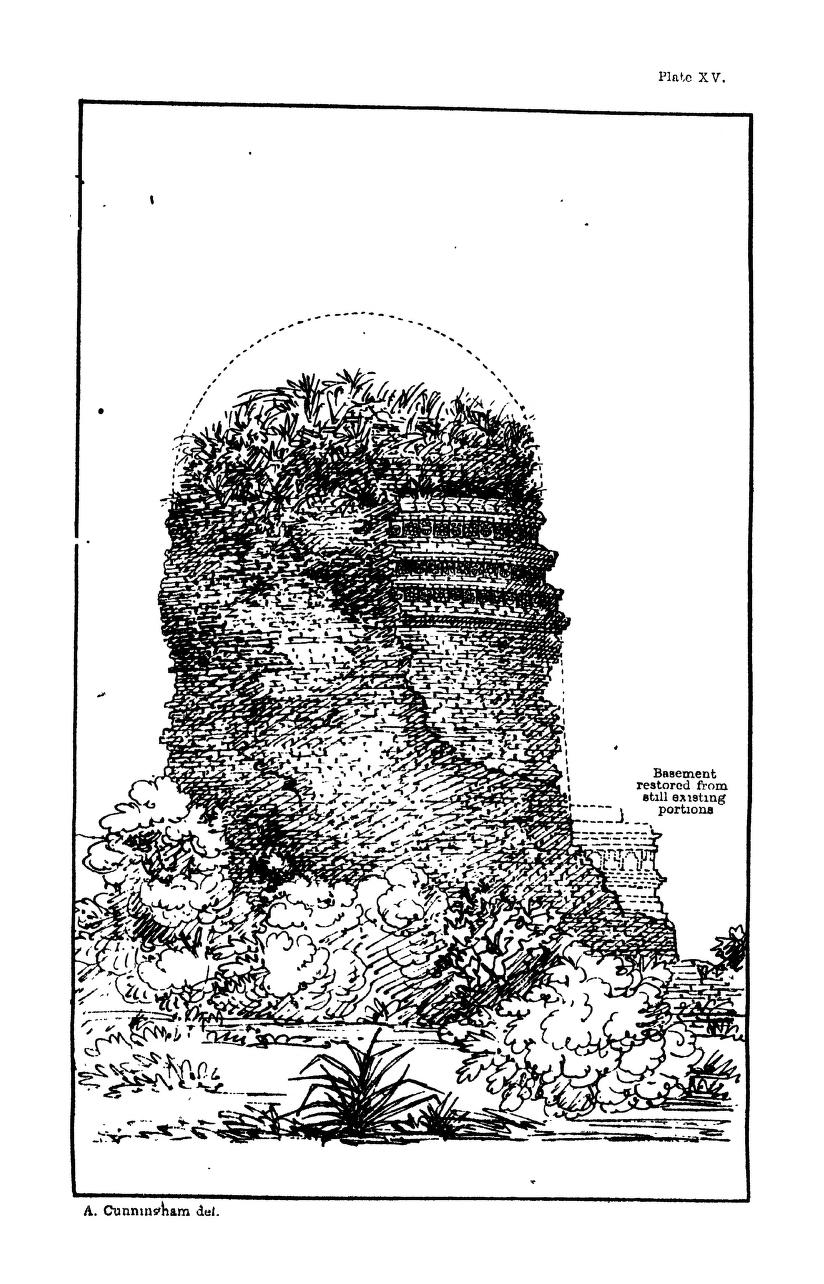
The stupa as it appeared to Alexander Cunningham in 1862

The hill on which these structures are found very closely matches the account of the "Hill of the Isolated Rock" related in 400 CE by the Chinese Buddhist monk Faxian, as well as the description by Xuanzang of the hill of Indra-sila-guha. Faxian made no mention of the stupa, but Xuanzang (c. 622 CE) did mention it. This led Alexander Cunningham (founder and first Director-General of the Archaeological Survey of India) to the conclusion that the stupa was probably constructed around 500 CE. According to an ancient legend, Buddhist monks built the stupa over the body of a dead goose. Cunningham found a broken sculpture with a carving of a goose on its pedestal, which supports his assertion that Giriyak Stupa is in fact the structure referred to in Xuanzang's account.

Francis Buchanan-Hamilton visited the area in 1811, as part of a survey of the areas within the jurisdiction of the British East India Company. He reported the presence of a tunnel or entrance at the base of the stupa, which he believed to have been created by a treasure hunter. In 1870, Alexander Cunningham excavated a 12.5 metres (41 feet) shaft from the top of the stupa all the way down to the stone foundation and then extended the earlier tunnel until it connected with the shaft. These excavations failed to reveal any information about the history of the structure.

== Restoration ==
The Archaeological Survey of India (ASI) conducted extensive restoration work on the cylindrical pillar of the stupa from 2011 until 2016. The badly decayed cylindrical wall of the stupa has been covered with a layer of bricks, and the tunnel at the base of the stupa has been filled.

== See also ==
- Chaukhandi Stupa
- Dhamek Stupa
- Indrasala Cave
- Sarnath
- List of Buddhist temples
