= Thatta Thattaha Maha Bawdi Pagoda =

Buddhist temple in Myanmar

- သတ္တသတ္တာဟ မဟာဗောဓိစေတီတော်
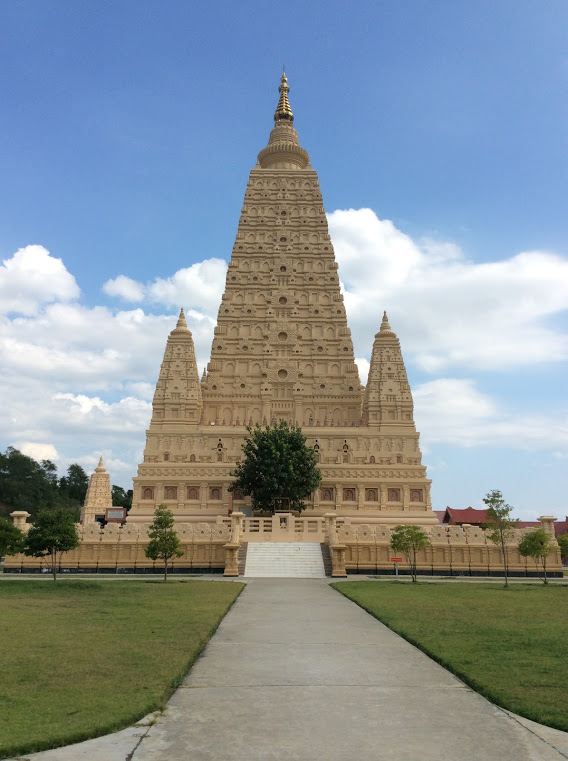

Religion
- Affiliation: Theravada Buddhism

Location
- Country: Pobbathiri Township, Naypyidaw, Burma
- Interactive map of Thatta Thattaha Maha Bawdi Pagoda
- Coordinates: 19.966611°N 96.150353°E

Architecture
- Founder: Naypyidaw Development Committee
- Completed: 2015; 11 years ago

Thatta Thattaha Maha Bawdi Pagoda (Burmese: သတ္တသတ္တာဟ မဟာဗောဓိစေတီတော်; Pali: Sattasattāhamahābodhi Cetiya) is a Buddhist temple on Udayaraṃsi hillock in Pobbathiri Township, Naypyidaw Union Territory, Myanmar (Burma). The pagoda is a replica of the Mahabodhi Temple in Bodh Gaya, Bihar, India. The replica is 162 feet (49 m) tall.

The buddhābhiṣeka ritual of the pagoda's main Buddha image was held on 13 May 2014.

The complex also houses replicas of key locations in Gautama Buddha's life (သံဝေဇနိယလေးဌာန), including his birth, his enlightenment, his preaching and his death, built for worshippers who have difficulties making a pilgrimage to Bodh Gaya.

== See also ==
- Buddhism in Myanmar
