= Indrasala Cave =

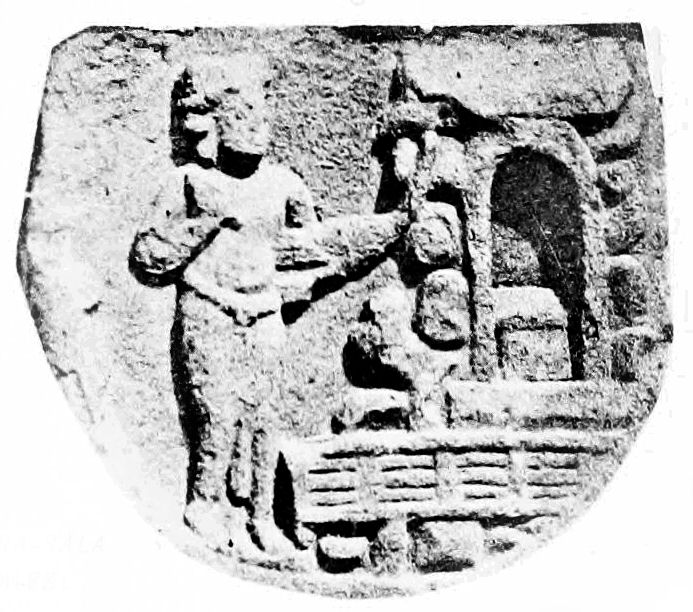
Visit of Indra to the Indrasala cave. The Buddha is symbolized by his throne in the cave (Mahabodhi Temple, Bodh Gaya, circa 150 BCE).

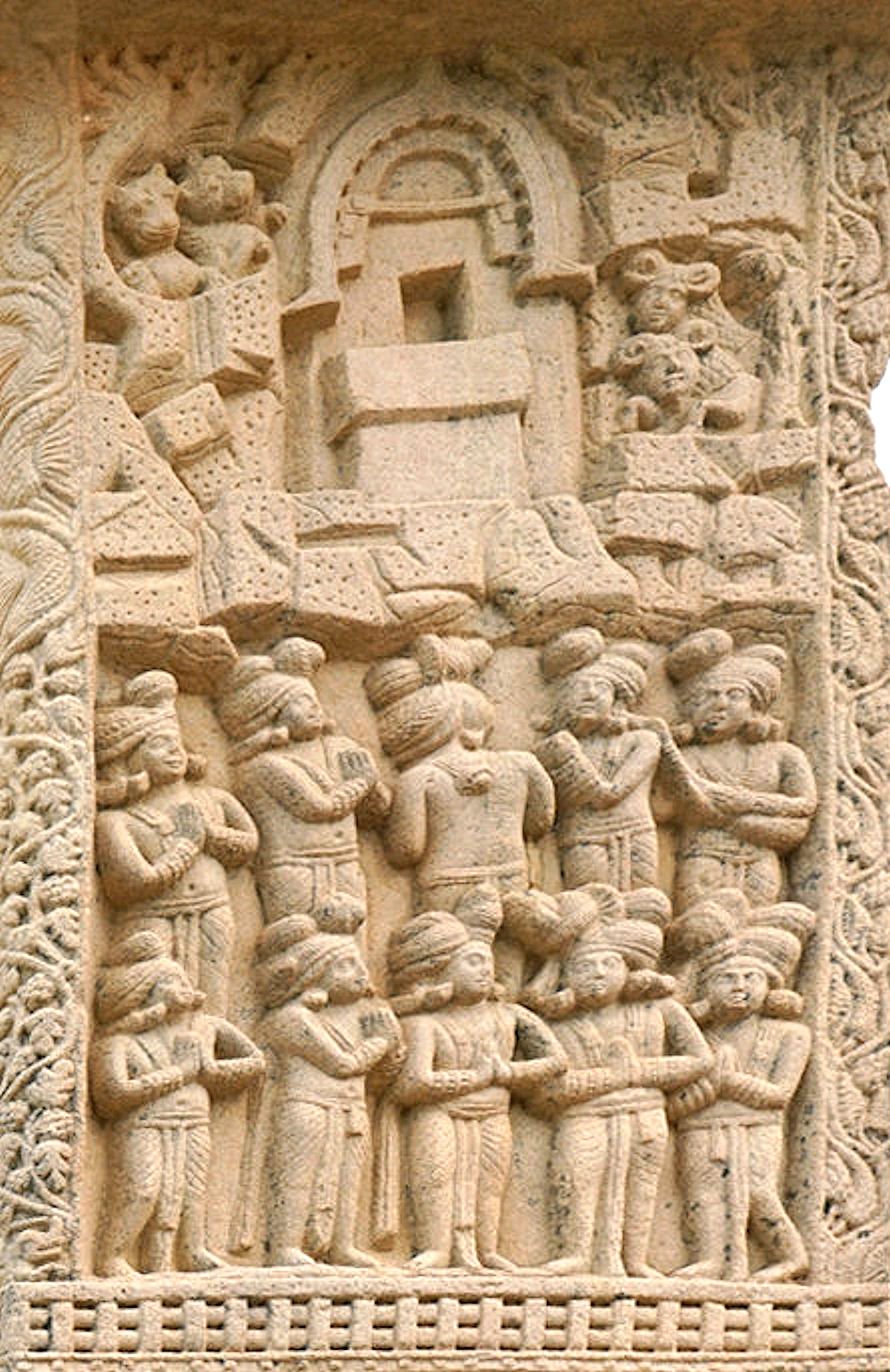
The Visit of Indra to the Buddha in the Indrasaila cave. The Buddha is symbolized by his throne. Wild animal are depicted around the cave (Stupa 1 Northern Gateway, Sanchi. 1st century BCE/CE).

The Indrasala Cave, also called Indrasila Guha or Indrasaila Cave, is a cave site mentioned in Buddhist texts. It is stated in Buddhist mythology to be the cave where Buddha lived for a while, and gave the sermon called the Sakkapañha Sutta to deity Indra. This Sutta is found as chapter II.21 of Dīgha Nikāya.

== Legend ==
In the Sakkapañha Sutta sermon, the Buddha addresses Sakra (also known as Indra) accompanied by Pancasikha (also known as Kubera). After some harp-playing by Pancasikha, Indra asks 42 questions to the Buddha, which he answers. The teachings in this Indrasala Cave Sutta is, in part, the basis for the Theravada tradition of punna (earning merit) and varam (favor).

== Location ==
Buddhist texts mention the Indrasala Cave to be in the Vediya or Vediyaka mountain, to the north of Ambasanda, near Rajagrha.

Since the 19th century, many scholars had attempted to identify this hill and the location of the Indrasala Cave where Buddha lived. Alexander Cunningham believed it to be in modern Giryak.

More recently, a cave on the solitary hill in Parbati village (also known as Parwati or Parwatipur) in Nawada has been proposed, which is situated north to the village of Apsarh (modern-day Ambasanda).

== Depictions ==
The visit is a scene in series showing the life of Buddha in art, though not one of the most common, especially after the first centuries of Buddhist art. Numerous depictions of the scene are known, the earliest being those of the Mahabodhi Temple at Bodh Gaya, circa 150 BCE. In a Gandhara artwork dated to 89 CE, the scene "Visit to the Indrasala Cave" is depicted with Indra identifiable with his elephant seated to the right, the Buddha is shown living in a cave by the wavy rocky landscape with wild animals above.

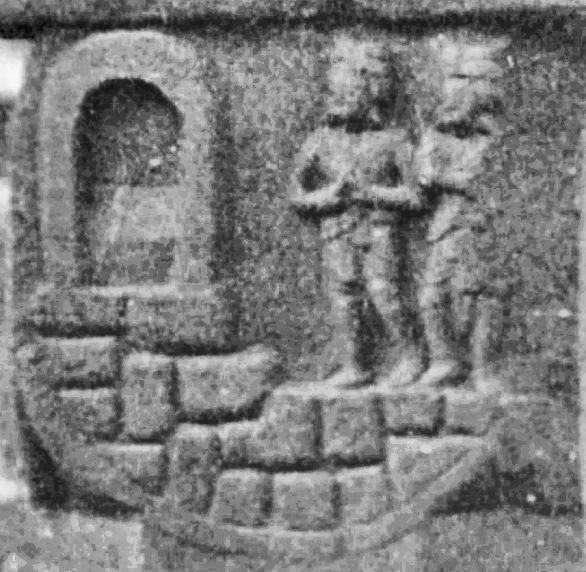
Visit of Indra to the Indrasala cave. The Buddha is symbolized by his throne in the cave (Mahabodhi Temple, Bodh Gaya, circa 150 BCE).

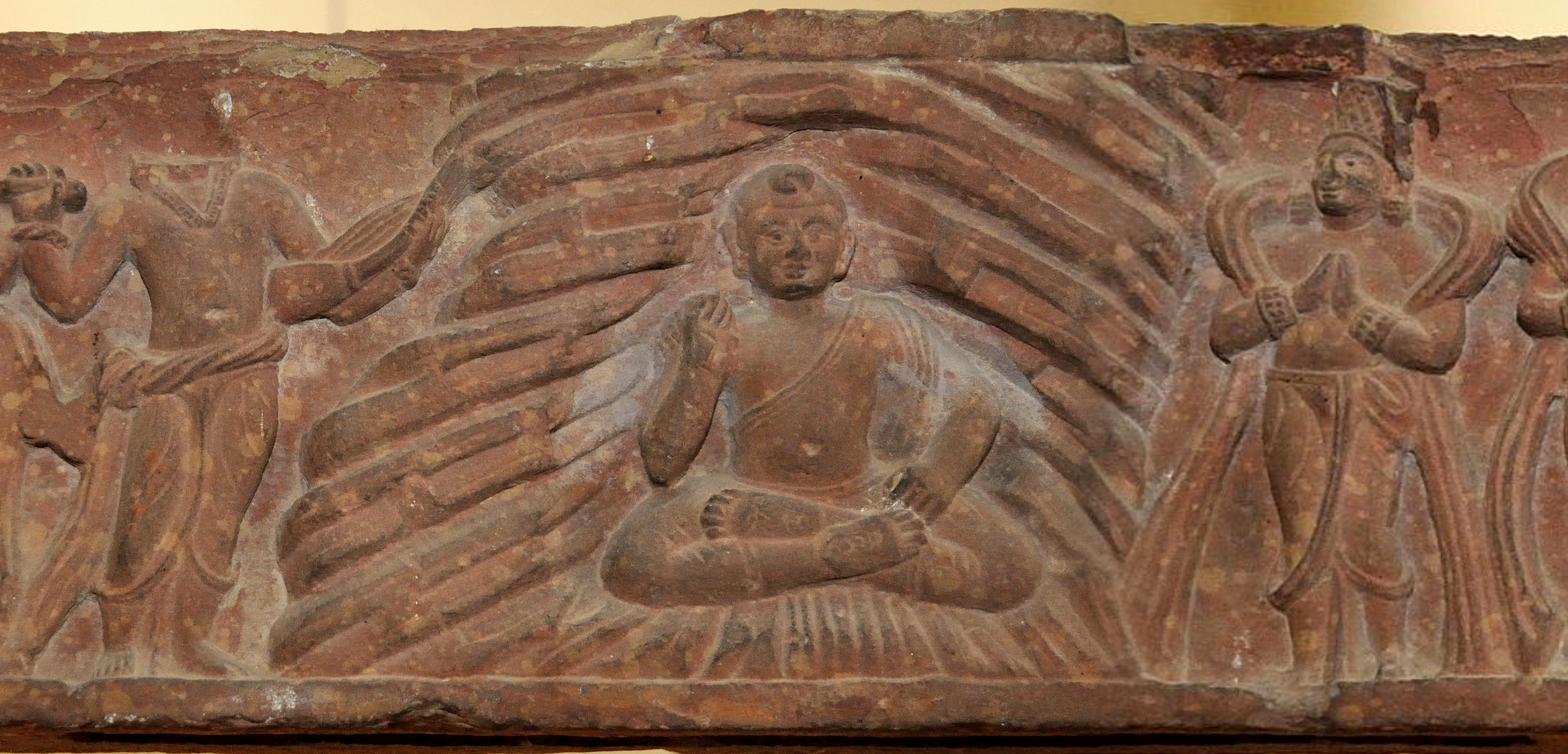
The same scene in a 50-100 CE relief, Mathura art

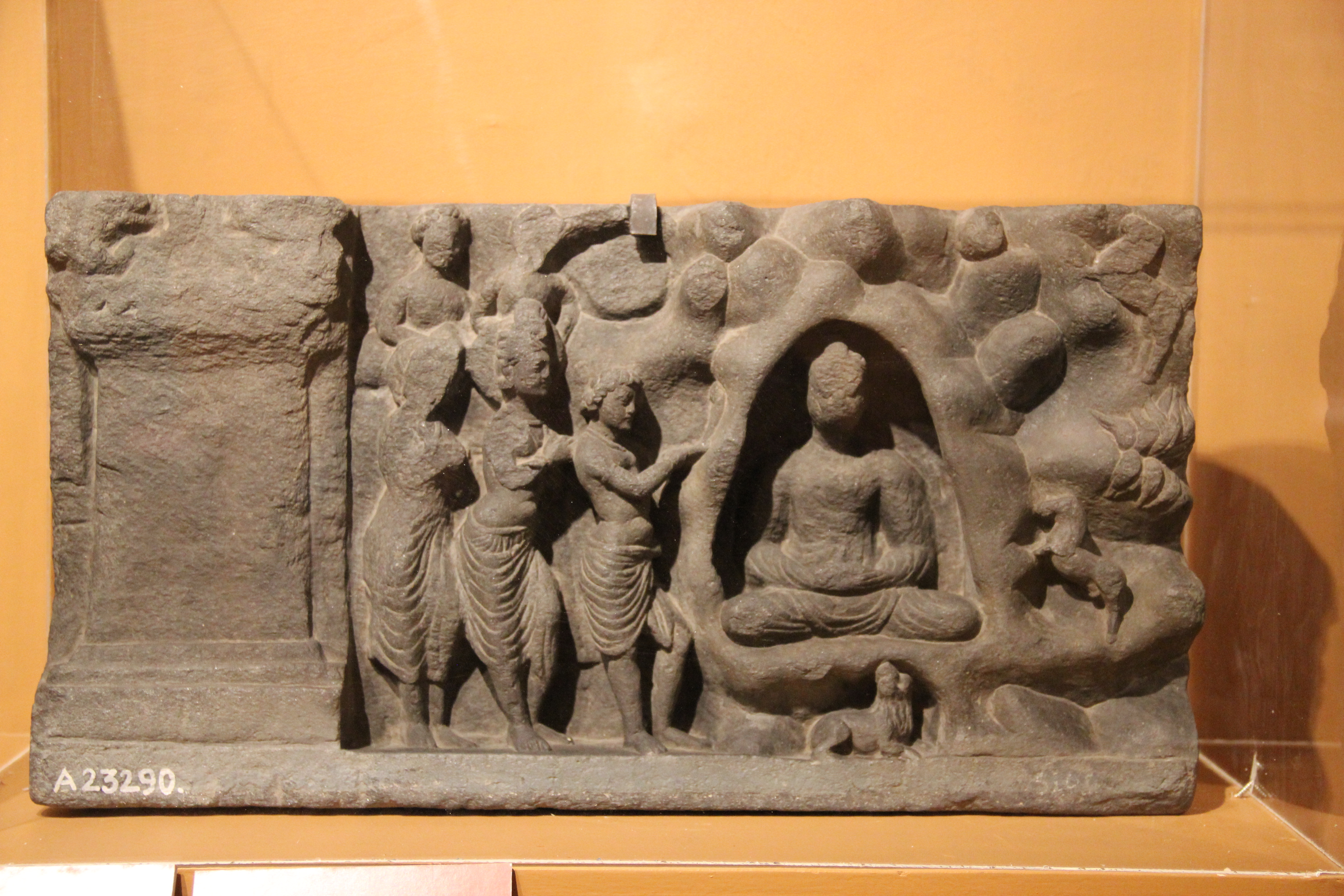
The same scene in a c. 2nd-century relief from Loriyan Tangai, Gandhara. The Buddha is shown in Indrasala cave.

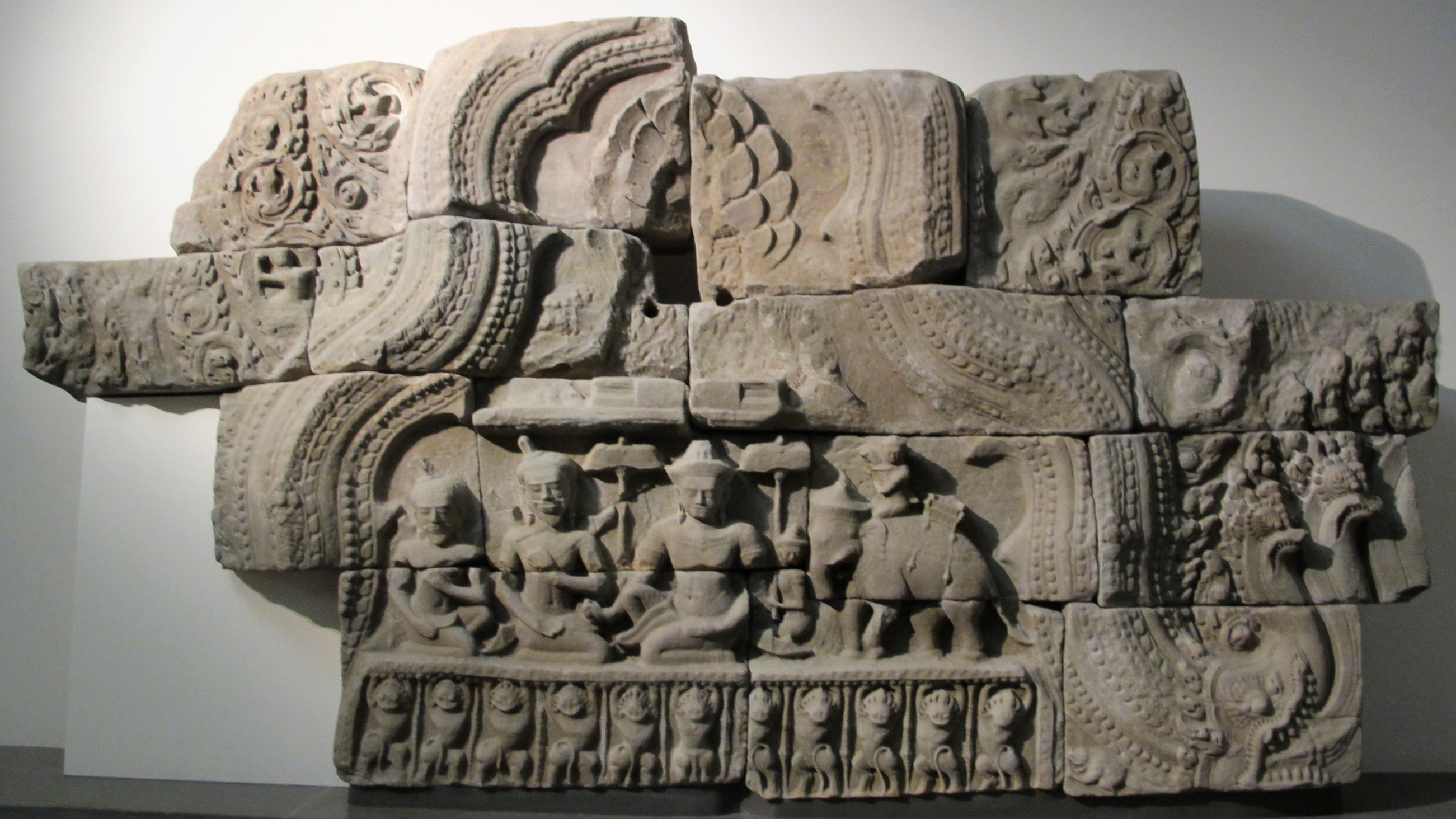
Indra visiting the Buddha in the Indrasala cave, Preah Khan, style of the Bayon, Cambodia, 1190-1210 CE.

== See also ==
- Vulture Peak
