= Mahabodhi Temple, Bagan =

Prominent Buddhist temple in Bagan, Myanmar

Mahabodhi Temple
- မဟာဗောဓိဘုရား
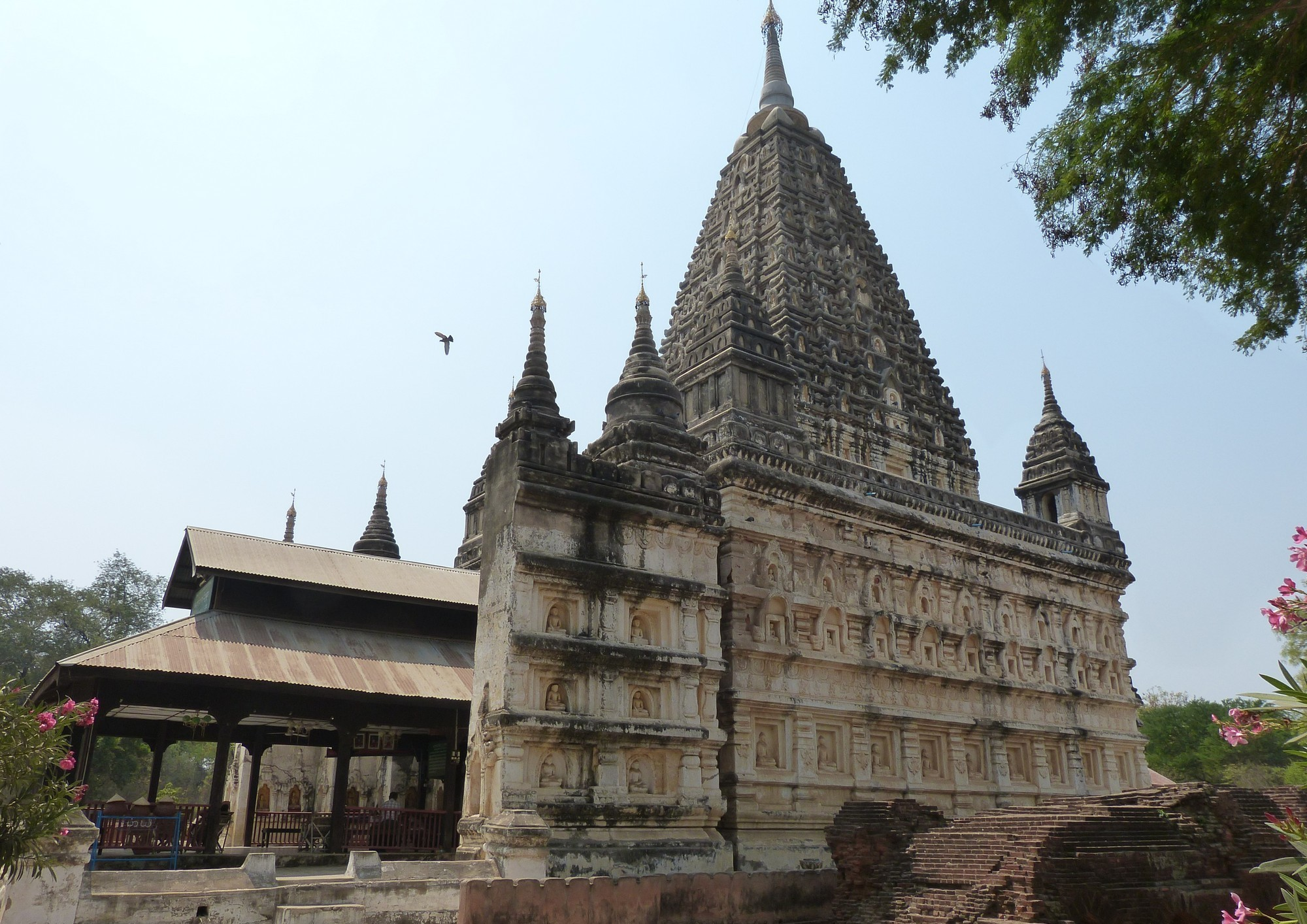

- Location within Myanmar

Religion
- Affiliation: Theravada Buddhism

Location
- Location: Bagan, Mandalay Region
- Country: Myanmar
- Coordinates: 21.173240°N 94.860481°E

Architecture
- Founder: King Htilominlo
- Completed: early 13th century

The Mahabodhi Temple (Burmese: မဟာဗောဓိဘုရား [məhà bɔ́dḭ tɕáʊɰ̃]) is a Buddhist temple located in Bagan, Myanmar.

== History ==
The Mahabodhi Temple was constructed during the reign of King Htilominlo (r. 1211–1235), and is modeled after the Mahabodhi Temple in Bihar, India. The temple is built in an architectural style typical of the Gupta period, and contains a large pyramidal tower with many niches containing over 450 images of the Buddha. The temple survived the 1975 Bagan earthquake, and underwent repairs in the subsequent years.
