= Mahabodhi Temple =

Buddhist temple in Bodh Gaya, India

- Mahābodhi Mahāvihāra
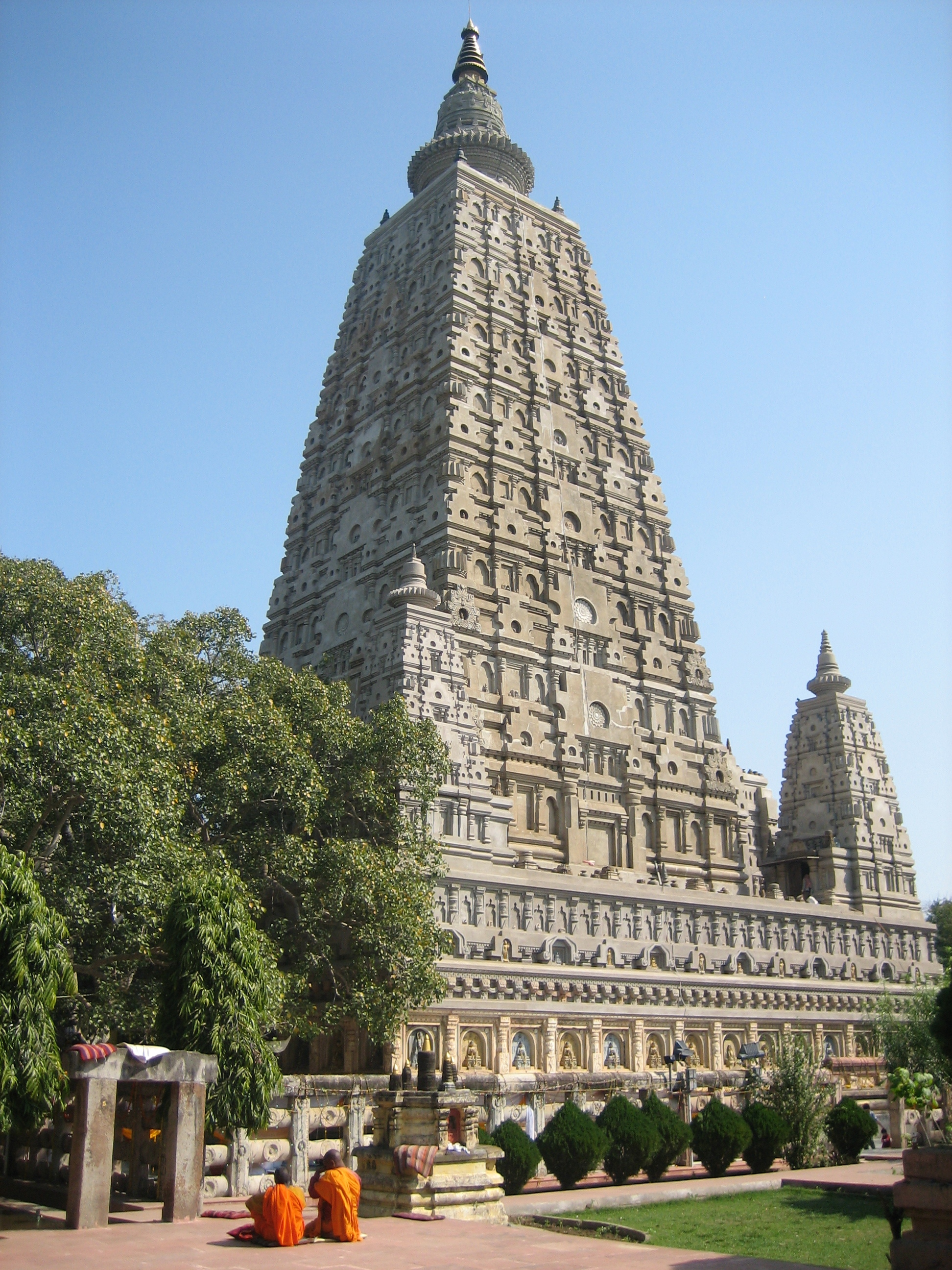
- Mahabodhi Temple
- Interactive map of Mahabodhi Temple
- 24°41′46″N 84°59′29″E
- Type: Buddhist temple
- Location: Bodh Gaya, Bihar, India
- Region: Magadha

History
- Built: Site of worship since c. 3rd century BCE; Current temple built c. 5/6th century CE
- Built by: Ashoka

Site notes
- Length: 240 m (800 ft)
- Width: 490 m (1,600 ft)
- Area: 12 ha (30 acres)
- Archaeologists: Alexander Cunningham
- Owner: Government of Bihar
- Public access: Yes

UNESCO World Heritage Site
- Official name: Mahabodhi Temple Complex at Bodh Gaya
- Criteria: Cultural: i, ii, iii, iv, vi
- Reference: 1056
- Inscription: 2002 (26th Session)
- Area: 4.86 ha (12.0 acres)

The Mahabodhi Temple (literally: "Great Awakening Temple") or the Mahābodhi Mahāvihāra, is a restored Buddhist temple in Bodh Gaya, Bihar, India, marking the location where the Buddha is said to have attained enlightenment, according to the Buddhist faith. A UNESCO World Heritage Site, the site contains a tree believed to be a descendant of the Bodhi Tree under which the Buddha gained enlightenment and which has been a major pilgrimage destination of Buddhists for over two thousand years. The Mahabodhi Temple at Bodh Gaya is the holiest and most revered pilgrimage site for Buddhists worldwide.

Some of the site's elements date to the period of Ashoka (died c. 232 BCE). What is now visible on the ground dates from the 6th century CE, or possibly earlier, as well as several major restorations since the 19th century. The structure, however, also potentially incorporates large parts of earlier work, possibly from the 2nd or 3rd century CE. Archaeological finds from the site indicate that the place was a site of veneration for Buddhists since at least the Mauryan period. In particular, the Vajrasana, which is located within the temple itself has been dated to the third century BCE.

Many of the oldest sculptural elements have been moved to the museum beside the temple, and some, such as the carved stone railing wall around the main structure, have been replaced by replicas. The main temple's survival is especially impressive, as it was mostly made of brick covered with stucco, materials that are much less durable than stone. However, it is understood that very little of the original sculptural decoration has survived.

The temple complex includes two large straight-sided shikhara towers, the largest being over 55 metres (180 feet) high. This is a stylistic feature that has continued in Jain and Hindu temples to the present day, and influenced Buddhist architecture in other countries, in forms like the pagoda.

== History ==
=== The Buddha ===
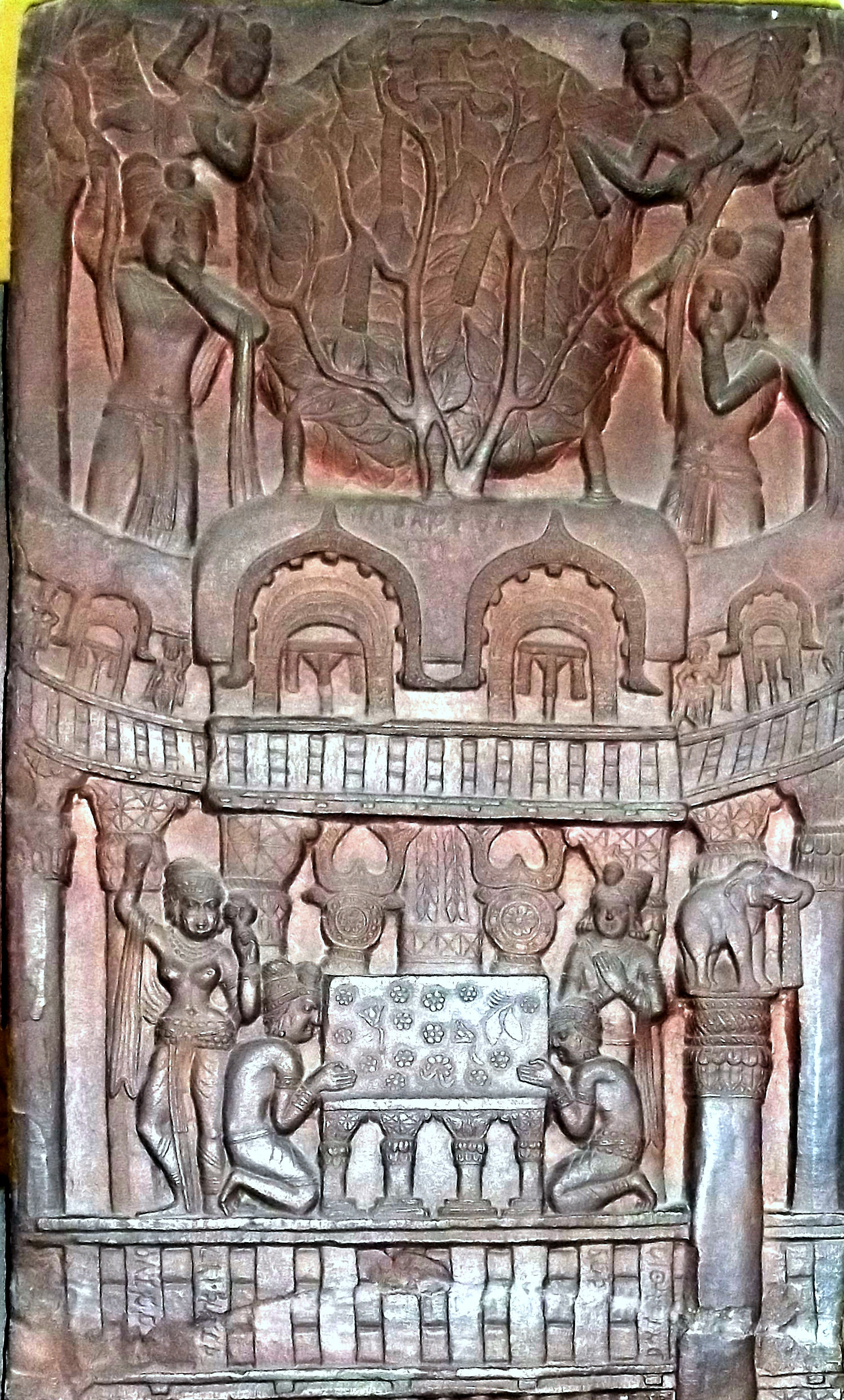
Ashoka's Mahabodhi Temple and Diamond throne in Bodh Gaya, built c. 250 BCE. The inscription between the Chaitya arches reads: "Bhagavato Sakamunino / bodho" i.e. "The building round the Bodhi tree of the Bhagavat (Holy) Sakamuni (Shakyamuni)". Also interesting to note is that the word Bhagavā is used for Buddha in these Buddhist texts. The elephant-crowned pillar of Ashoka (now lost) is visible. Bharhut frieze (c. 100 BCE).

Traditional accounts say that, around 589 BCE, Siddhartha Gautama, a young prince who saw the suffering of the world and wanted to end it, reached the forested banks of the Phalgu river, near the city of Gaya, India. There he sat in meditation under a peepul tree (Ficus religiosa or Sacred Fig) which later came to be known as the Bodhi Tree. According to Buddhist scriptures, after three days and three nights, Siddharta attained enlightenment and freedom from suffering. In that location, Mahabodhi Temple was built by Emperor Ashoka in around 260 BCE.

The Buddha then spent the succeeding seven weeks at seven different spots in the vicinity meditating and considering his experience. Several specific places at the current Mahabodhi Temple relate to the traditions surrounding these seven weeks:

- The first week was spent under the Bodhi tree.
- During the second week, the Buddha remained standing and stared, uninterrupted, at the Bodhi tree. This spot is marked by the Animeshlocha Stupa, that is, the unblinking stupa or shrine, to the northeast of the Mahabodhi Temple complex. There stands a statue of Buddha with his eyes fixed towards the Bodhi Tree.
- The Buddha is said to have walked back and forth between the location of the Animeshlocha Stupa and the Bodhi Tree. According to legend, lotus flowers sprung up along this route; it is now called Ratnachakrama or the jewel walk.
- He spent the fourth week near Ratnagar Chaitya, to the northeast side.
- He spend the fifth week at the abode of Mucilinda the Nāga king.
- He spent the sixth week next to the Lotus pond.
- He spent the seventh week under the Rajyatna tree.

==== Mahabodhi tree ====
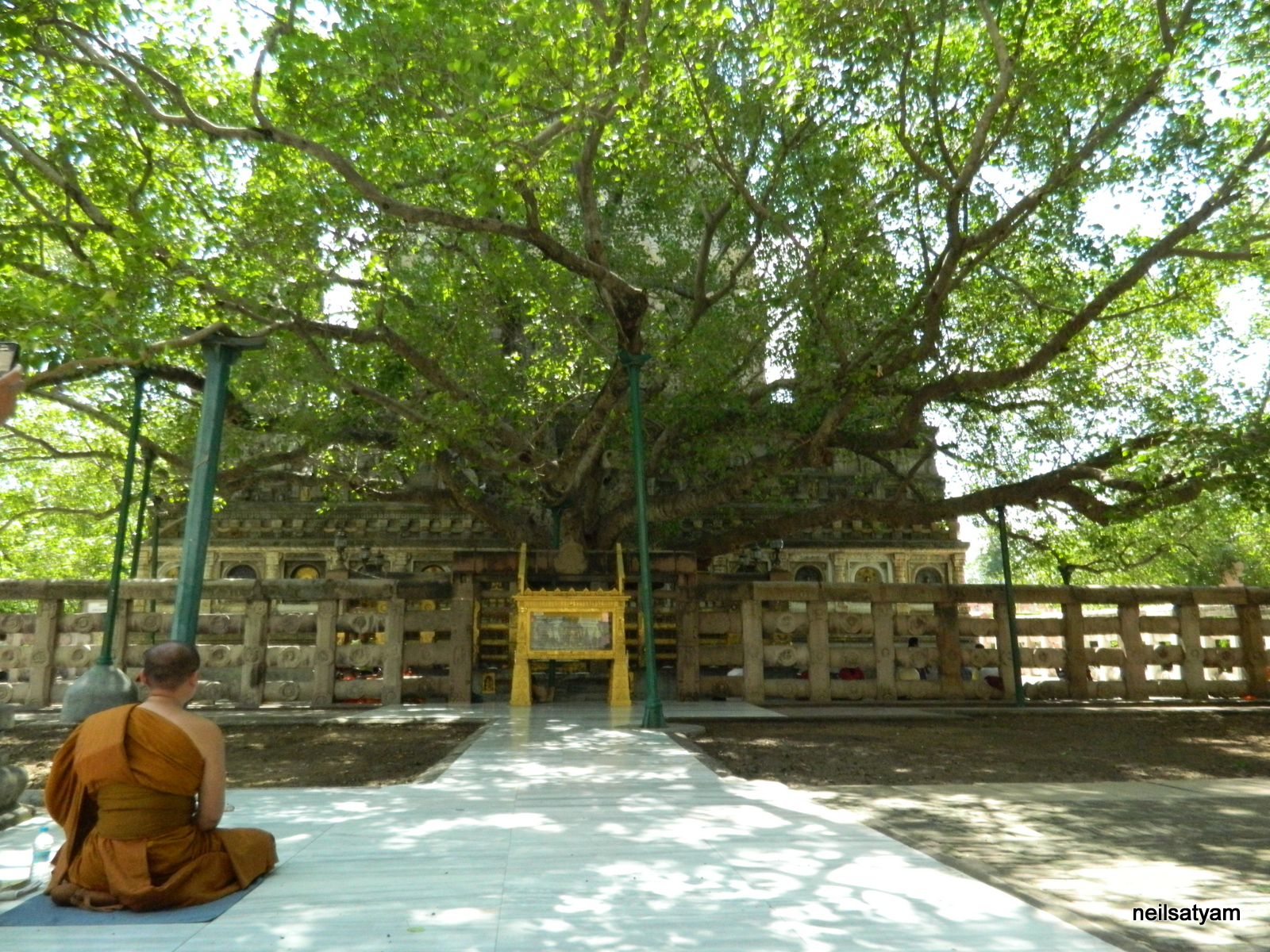
The current Bodhi tree at Bodh Gaya, said to be a descendant of the tree under which Gautama Buddha is believed to have obtained enlightenment

The Bodhi tree at Bodh Gaya is said to be a direct descendant of the original tree at Bodh Gaya that the historical Buddha, Siddhartha Gautama, meditated under when he attained enlightenment or omniscient wisdom. The temple was built directly to the east of the tree.

According to Buddhist mythology, if no Bodhi tree grows at the site, the ground around the Bodhi tree is devoid of all plants for a distance of one royal karīsa. Through the ground around the Bodhi tree no being, not even an elephant, can travel.

According to the Jatakas, the navel of the earth lies at this spot, and no other place can support the weight of the Buddha's attainment. Another Buddhist tradition claims that when the world is destroyed at the end of a kalpa, the Bodhimanda is the last spot to disappear, and will be the first to appear when the world emerges into existence again. Tradition also claims that a lotus will bloom there, and if a Buddha is born during the new kalpa, the lotus flowers bloom in accordance with the number of Buddhas expected to arise. According to legend, in the case of Gautama Buddha, a Bodhi tree sprang up on the day he was born.

=== Mauryan establishment ===
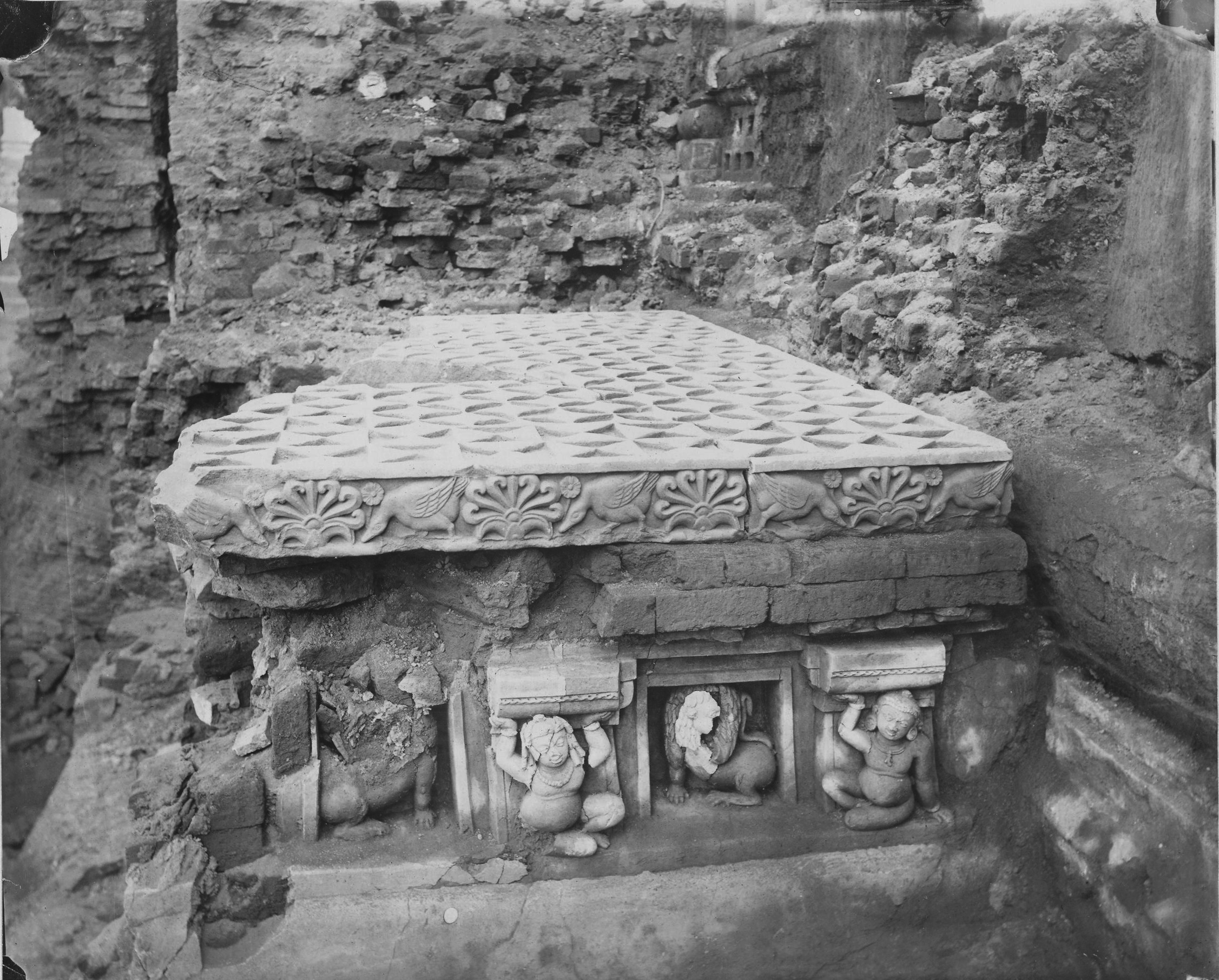
Discovery of the Diamond throne, built by Ashoka c. 250 BCE.

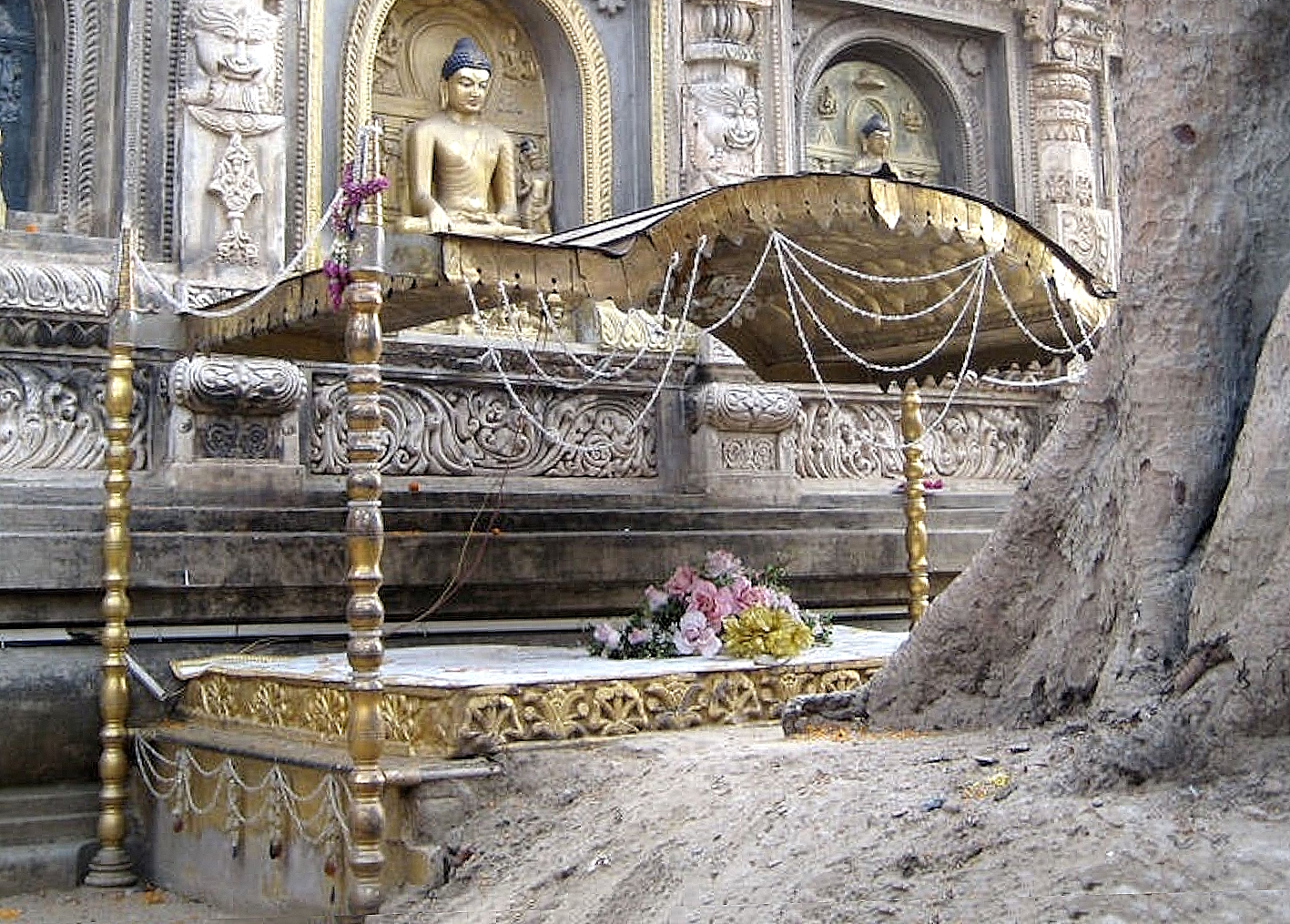
The Diamond Throne in its present form.

In approximately 250 BCE, about 200 years after the Buddha was said to have attained enlightenment, Emperor Ashoka of the Mauryan Empire visited Bodh Gaya in order to establish a monastery and shrine on the holy site, which has today disappeared.

There remains however the Diamond throne, which he had established at the foot of the Bodhi Tree. The Diamond throne, or Vajrasana, is thought to have been built by Emperor Ashoka of the Maurya Empire between 250 and 233 BCE, at the location where the Buddha reached enlightenment. It is worshipped today, and is the centre of many festivities at the temple.

Representations of the early temple structure meant to protect the Bodhi Tree are found at Sanchi, on the toraṇas of Stūpa I, dating from around 25 BCE, and on a relief carving from the stupa railing at Bhārhut, from the early Shunga period (c. 185 – c. 73 BCE).

=== Sunga structures ===
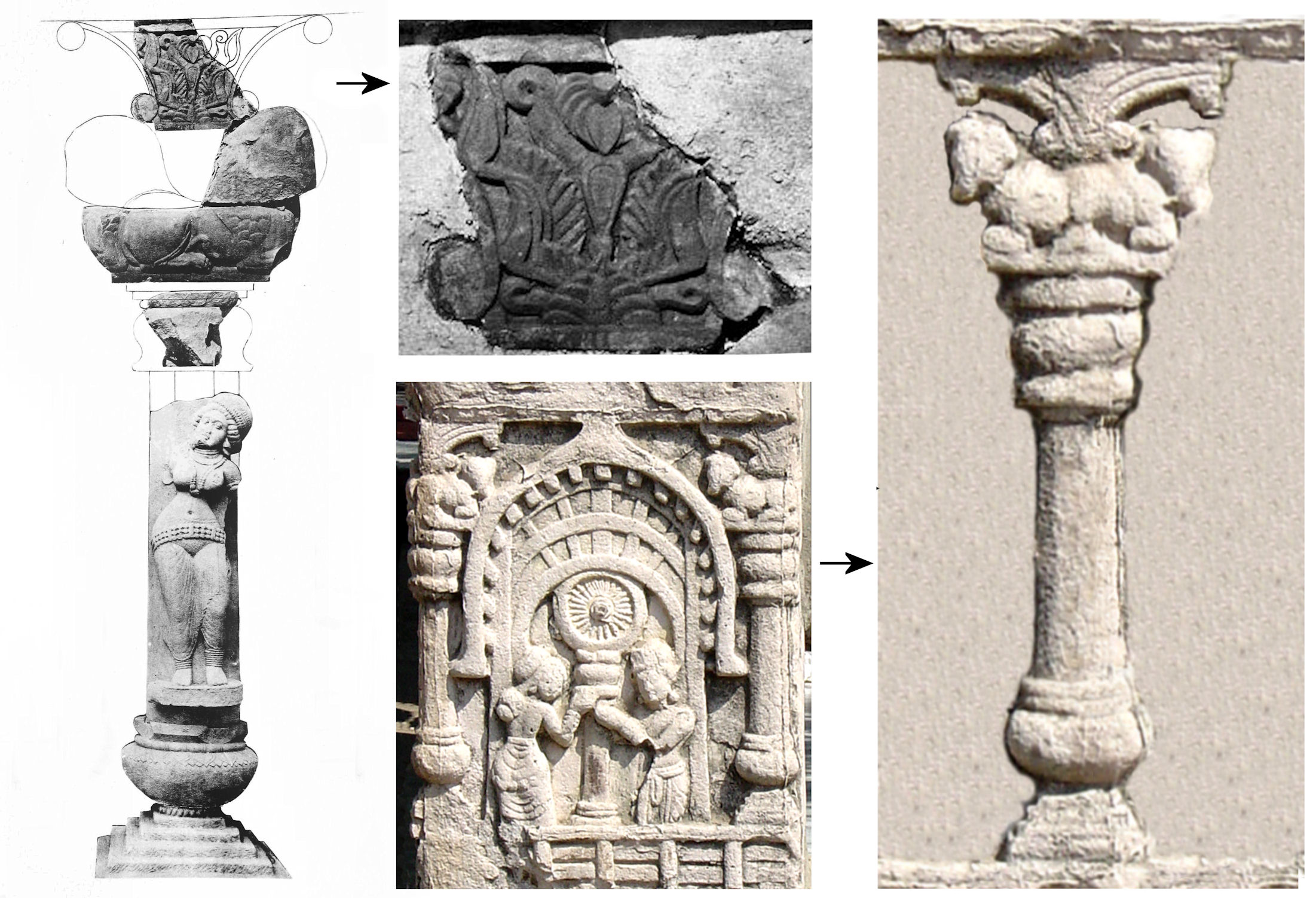
Reconstitution of the Sunga period pillars at Bodh Gaya, from archaeology (left) and from artistic relief (right). They are dated to the 1st century BCE. Reconstitution is done by Alexander Cunningham.

==== Columns with pot-shaped bases ====
Additional structures were brought in by the Sungas. In particular, columns with pot-shaped bases were found around the Diamond throne. These columns are thought to date to the 1st century BCE, towards the end of the Sungas. These columns, which were found through archaeological research at the Buddha's Walk in the Mahabodhi Temple, quite precisely match the columns described on the reliefs found on the gateway pillars.

==== Railings ====
The railings around the Mahabodhi Temple at Bodh Gaya are ancient. They are old sandstone posts dating about 150 BCE, during the Sunga period. There are carved panels as well as medallions, with many scenes similar to those of the contemporary Sunga railings at Bharhut (150 BCE) and Sanchi (115 BCE), although the reliefs at Sanchi Stupa No.2 are often considered the oldest of all. The railing was extended during the following century, down to the end of Gupta period (7th century), with coarse granite decorated with elaborate foliate ornaments and small figures as well as stupas. Many parts of the initial railing have been dismantled and are now in museums, such as the Indian Museum in Kolkata, and have been replaced by plaster copies.

Sunga railings at Bodh Gaya
Original railings
Early photographs of the railings (Henry Baily Wade Garrick, 1880)	Bodh Gaya Sunga pillar Bodh Gaya Sunga railing Bodh Gaya Sunga railing Bodh Gaya Sunga railing Bodh Gaya Sunga railing 1903 photograph
Remains of the railings in the Indian Museum, Calcutta	Bodh Gaya original railings, Indian Museum, Calcutta Bodh Gaya original railings, Indian Museum, Calcutta Railing post Another railing post
Devotion scenes
Bodhi Tree sculpture Bodhi Tree sculpture Dharmacakra Medallion Adoration of the Bodhi Tree
Animals
Elephant Centaur Horse Winged lion Cow nourishing her calf Bull
Stories
The Jetavana Garden at Sravasti. Padakusalamanava Jataka. Padakusalamanava Jataka Woman with child and goat Devotee and grottoe Amorous scene (drawing) Amorous scene Miraculous River crossing Miraculous river-crossing (drawing) Devotee and apsara Visit of Indra to the Indrasala Cave Kalpa drum Lakshmi lustrated by elephants Music scene Palace scene, Sibi Jataka Ploughing scene
Individual elements
Devotee Devotee Devotee Apsara Apsara (drawing) Vegetal medallion
The railings today at Bodh Gaya (mainly plaster duplicates)
Plaster copy and reconstruction of original Sunga railing Railing Post relief (plaster copy) Adoration of the wheel of the Law (plaster copy) Flower Design decorated with gold leaves Decorated railing

=== Gupta period ===
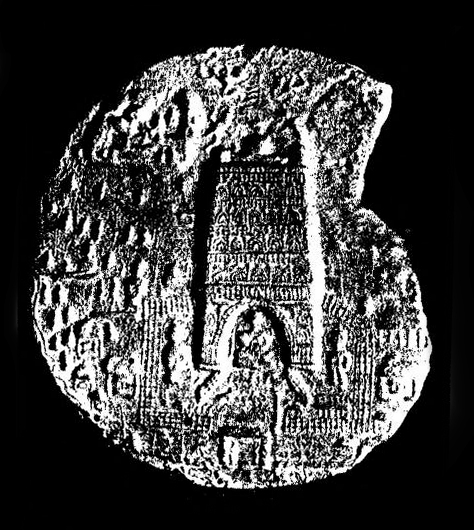
The Mahabodhi Temple in 150–200 CE. Recent images of the plaque

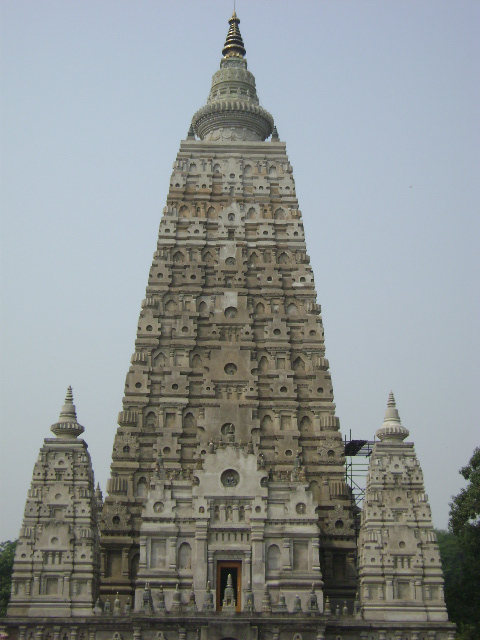
The Mahabodhi Temple: a stepped pyramid with a round stupa on top

While Asoka is considered the Mahabodhi Temple's founder, the current pyramidal structure dates from the Gupta Empire, in the 5th–6th century CE, and influenced later Hindu temple architecture in brick.

However, this may represent a restoration of earlier work of the 2nd or 3rd century: a plaque from Kumrahar dated 150–200 CE, based on its dated Kharoshthi inscriptions and combined finds of Huvishka coins, already shows the Mahabodhi Temple in its current shape with a stepped truncated pyramid and a small hemispherical stupa with finials on top. This is confirmed by archaeological excavations in Bodh Gaya.

It is thought that the temple in the shape of a truncated pyramid was derived from the design of the stepped stupas which had developed in Gandhara. The Mahabodhi Temple adapted the Gandharan design of a succession of steps with niches containing Buddha images, alternating with Greco-Roman pillars, and top by a stupa, as seen in the stupas of Jaulian. The structure is crowned by the shape of a hemispherical stupa topped by finials, forming a logical elongation of the stepped Gandharan stupas.

This truncated pyramid design also marked the evolution from the aniconic stupa dedicated to the cult of relics, to the iconic temple with multiple images of the Buddha and Bodhisattvas. This design was very influential in the development of later Hindu temples. The "shikhara" tower with an amalaka near the top is today considered more characteristic of Hindu temples.

=== Patronage ===
Throughout its history, the Mahabodhi Temple has been the site of patronage from various sources. Faxian in the 5th century, stated that there were three monasteries built around the temple complex with monks residing in them. These monks were supported by local people who provided them with food and other necessities. The patronage came from both within and outside of India. The vast number of votive stupas and sculptures that have been found within the Mahabodhi Temple complex are testament to this. A sixth-century donative record of a Sri Lankan monk named Mahānāman states that a temple was built at the Bodhimaṇḍa and attests to ties between the Mahabodhi Temple and Sri Lanka.

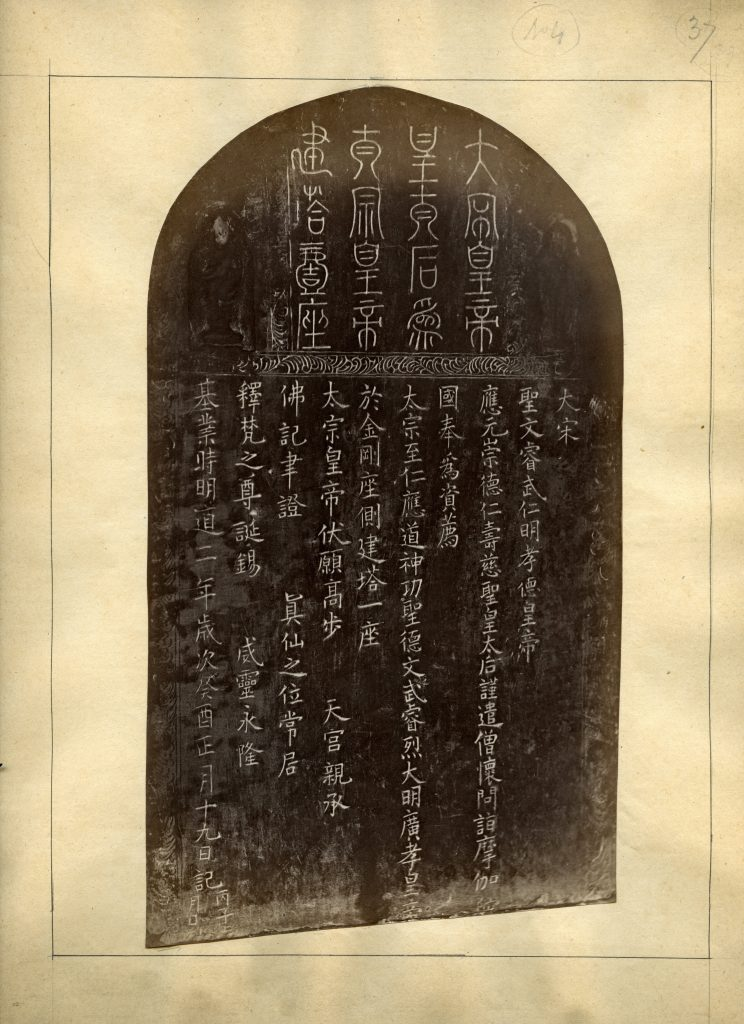
Bodhgaya Chinese inscription of Huaiwen dated 1033 CE who arrived on behald of Emperor Zhenzong of Song dynasty

From the eleventh-century onwards, patronage increased from countries like Tibet, China, Sri Lanka and Burma. King Kyansittha sent the first Burmese expedition to the Mahabodhi Temple during this period. Three additional missions also took place up to the fourteenth century. The purpose of these missions seems to have been to carry out repairs on the temple structure while also sending gifts among which were musical instruments. Donations also came from non-royal sources. So far, five Chinese inscriptions have been found at the temple complex which records gifts by Chinese monks in the eleventh century. One of these monks stated in their inscription that they were sent on behalf of the Song Emperor. Local polities like the Pithipatis of Magadha who were based in Bodh Gaya also played a role in patronising the temple.

=== Decline ===
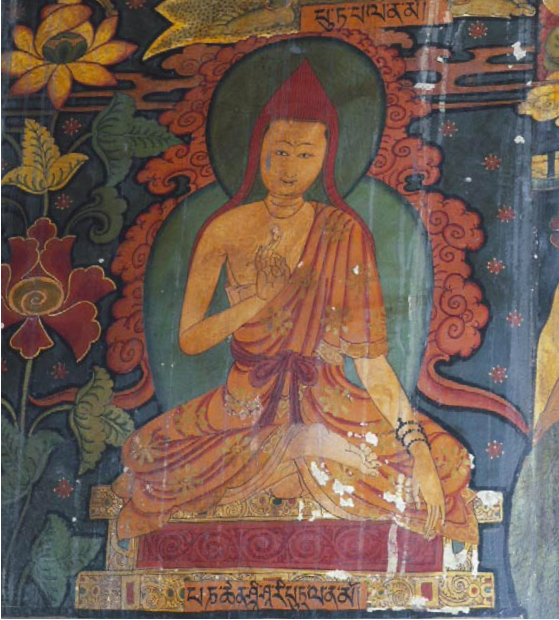
Mural of Śāriputra (1335–1426 CE), the last pre-modern abbot of the Mahabodhi Temple

Buddhism declined when the dynasties patronizing it declined, following Huna invasions and the early Arab Islamic invasions such as that of Muhammad bin Qasim. A strong revival occurred under the Pala Empire in the northeast of the subcontinent (where the temple is situated). Mahayana Buddhism flourished under the Palas between the 8th and the 12th century. However, after the fall of the Palas, Buddhism's position again began to erode and became nearly extinct in India. During the 12th century CE, Bodh Gaya and the nearby regions were invaded and destroyed by Muslim Turk armies, led by Delhi Sultanate's Qutb al-Din Aibak and Bakhtiyar Khilji. During this period, the Mahabodhi Temple fell into disrepair and was largely abandoned. The Tibetan monk, Dharmasvamin, came to Bodh Gaya in late 1234 and gives a detailed account of the condition of the temple stating that the images of the Buddha in the sanctum of the temple had to be blocked off by monks to protect them from "Turushkas". The Vajrasana throne and other objects however were left alone by the Turks and did not seem to interest them. Dharmasvamin also noted that there was considerable continued Sri Lankan influence at the site with only Sri Lankan monks being allowed to sleep in the courtyard and carry out worship.

In the 13th century, Burmese Buddhists built a temple with the same name and modelled on the original Mahabodhi Temple.

The last abbot of the Mahabodhi Temple was Śāriputra who took up the position in the late 14th century and carried out numerous repairs to the structure which had been destroyed by the Turks. This included the temples gandola which had been destroyed. Śāriputra eventually left India and travelled to Nepal in the 15th century.

=== Restoration ===
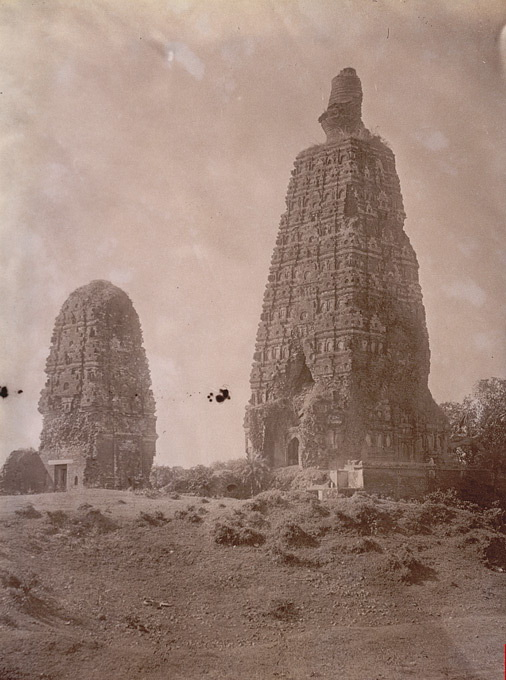
Temple before restoration

The stupa before modern restoration, 1897

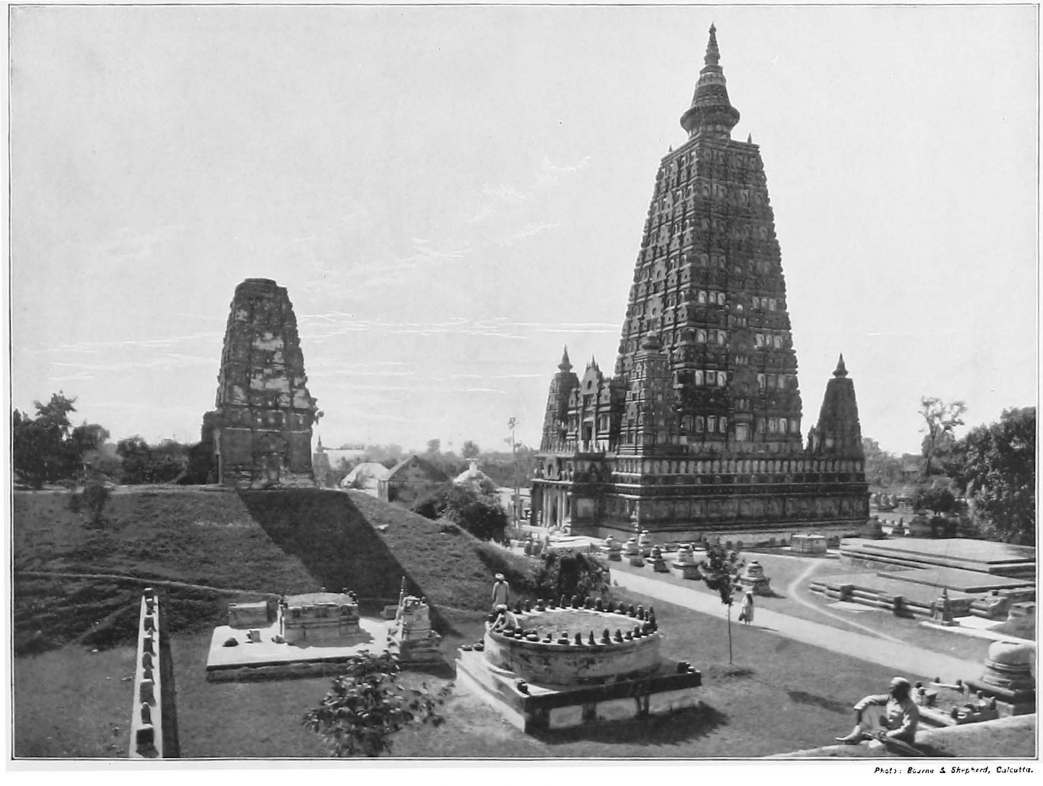
The temple as it appeared in 1899, shortly after its restoration in the 1880s

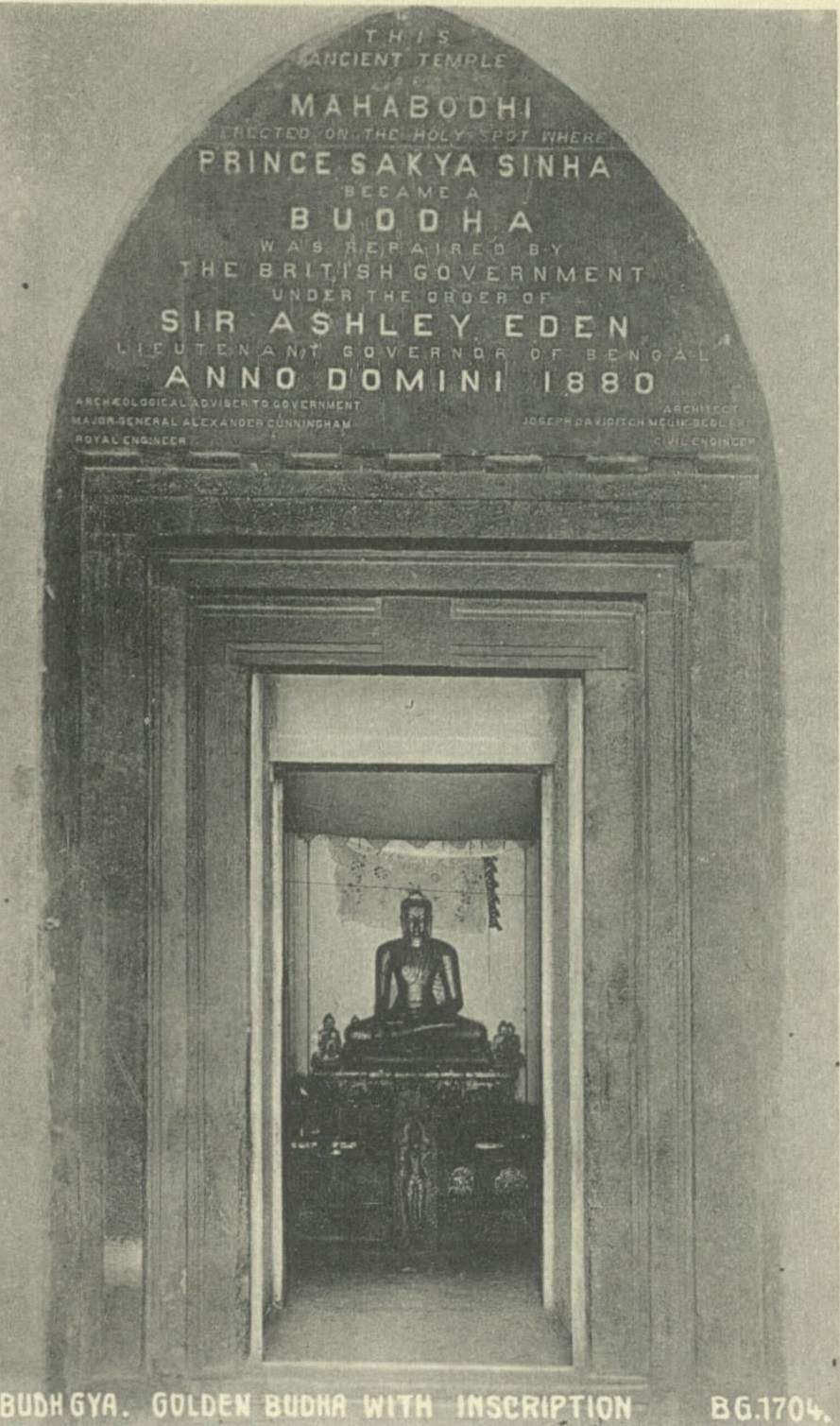
Interior of the temple after restoration

During the 13th century and again in the 19th century, Burmese rulers undertook restoration of the temple complex and surrounding wall. In the 1880s, the then-British colonial government of India began to restore Mahabodhi Temple under the direction of Sir Alexander Cunningham and Joseph David Beglar. In 1884, a large Buddha image of the Pāla period, likely removed at an earlier stage to the Mahant's residence from the temple sanctum, was reinstated. The plith of the image was reconstructed at the time and parts of the dedicatory inscription inserted in their current position. The inscription records the rededication of the image by Pīṭhīpati Jayasena in the 13th century. In 1886, Sir Edwin Arnold visited the site and under guidance from Ven. Weligama Sri Sumangala published several articles drawing the attention of the Buddhists to the deplorable conditions of Buddhagaya. The sculpture has since been repaired, painted and gilded and is under active worship in the sanctum.

== Architectural style ==
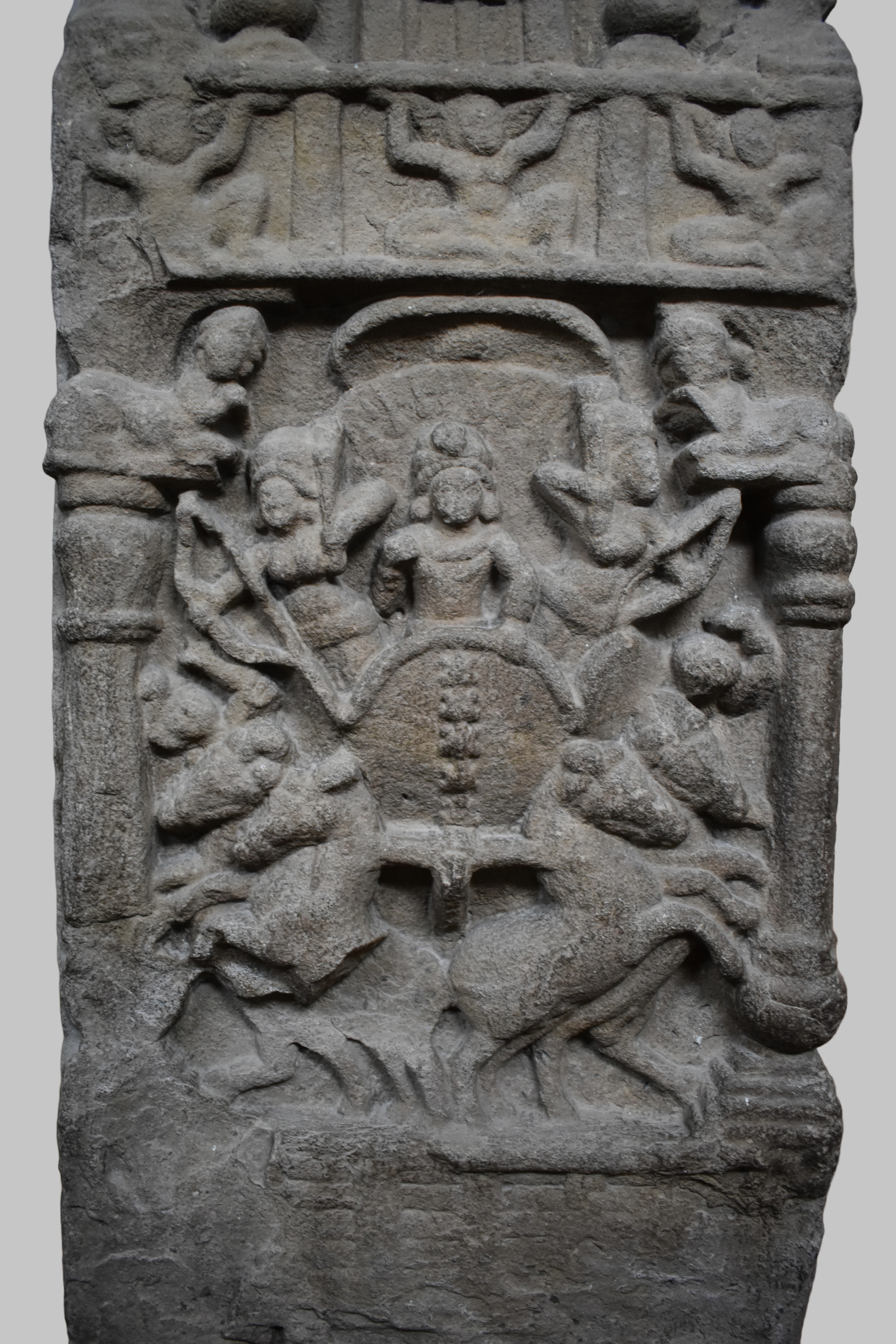
Bodh Gaya quadriga relief of the sun god Surya riding between pillars (detail of a railing post), 2nd–1st century BCE

Mahabodhi Temple is constructed of brick and is one of the oldest brick structures to have survived in eastern India. It is considered to be a fine example of Indian brickwork, and was highly influential in the development of later architectural traditions. According to UNESCO, "the present temple is one of the earliest and most imposing structures built entirely in brick from Gupta period" (300–600 CE). Mahabodhi Temple's central tower rises 55 metres (180 ft), and were heavily renovated in the 19th century. The central tower is surrounded by four smaller towers, constructed in the same style.

The Mahabodhi Temple is surrounded on all four sides by stone railings, about two metres high. The railings reveal two distinct types, both in style as well as the materials used. The older ones, made of sandstone, date to about 150 BCE, and the others, constructed from unpolished coarse granite, are believed to be of the Gupta period. The older railings have scenes such as Lakshmi, the Hindu/Buddhist goddess of wealth, being bathed by elephants; and Surya, the Hindu sun god, riding a chariot drawn by four horses. The newer railings have figures of stupas (reliquary shrines) and garudas (eagles). Images of lotus flowers also appear commonly.

Images of the site include Avalokiteśvara (Padmapani, Khasarpana), Vajrapani, Tara, Marichi, Yamantaka, Jambhala and Vajravārāhī.

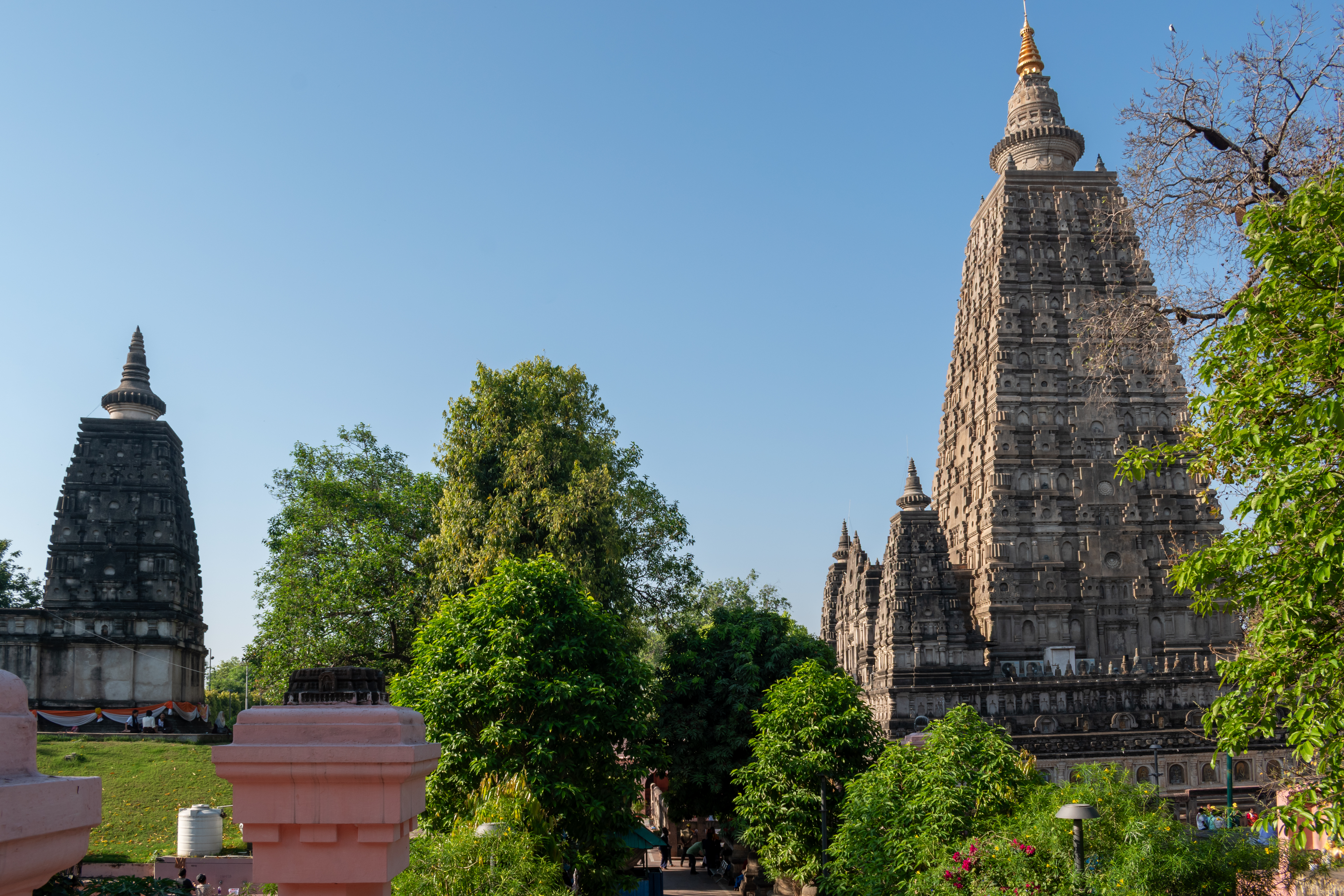

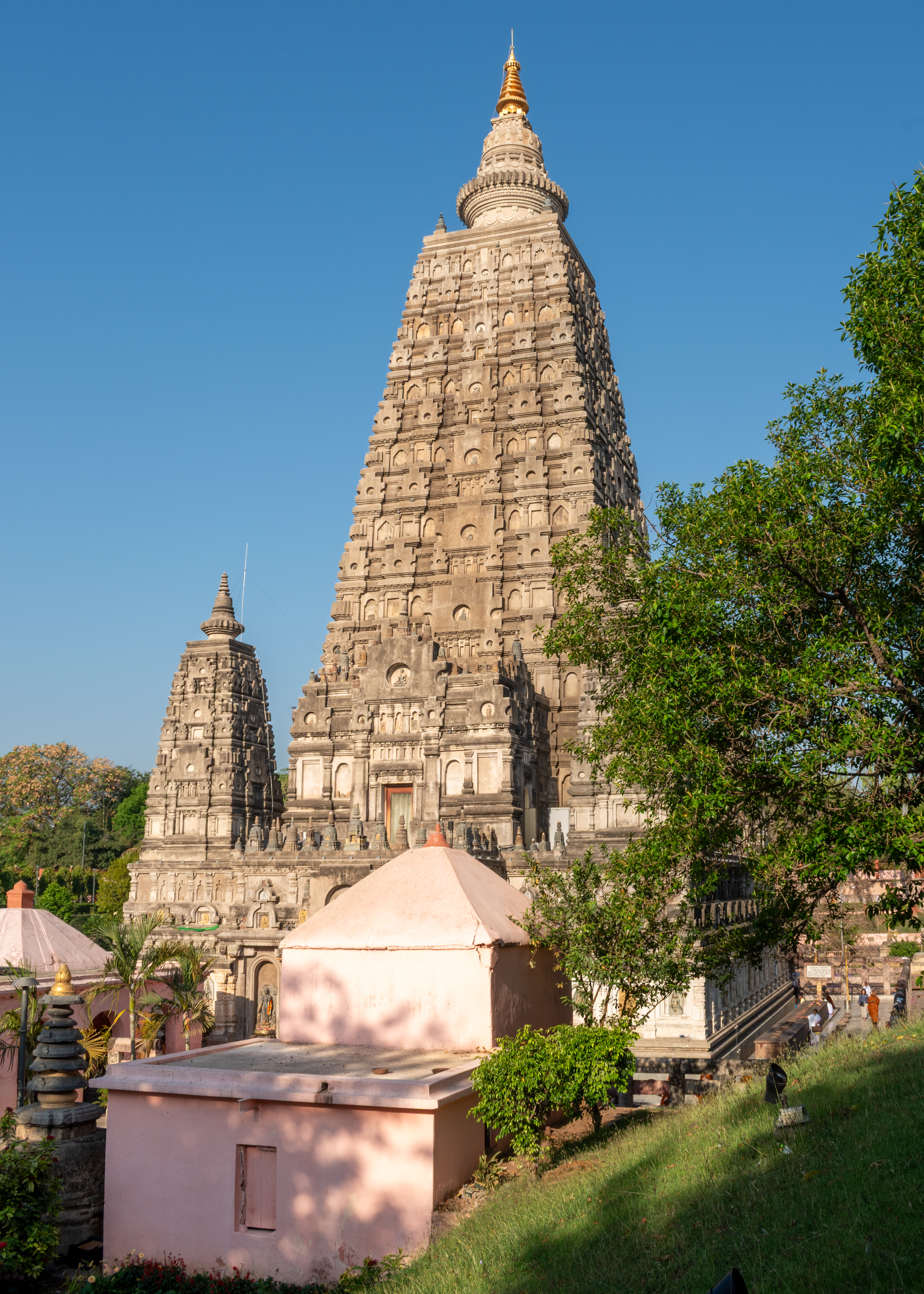

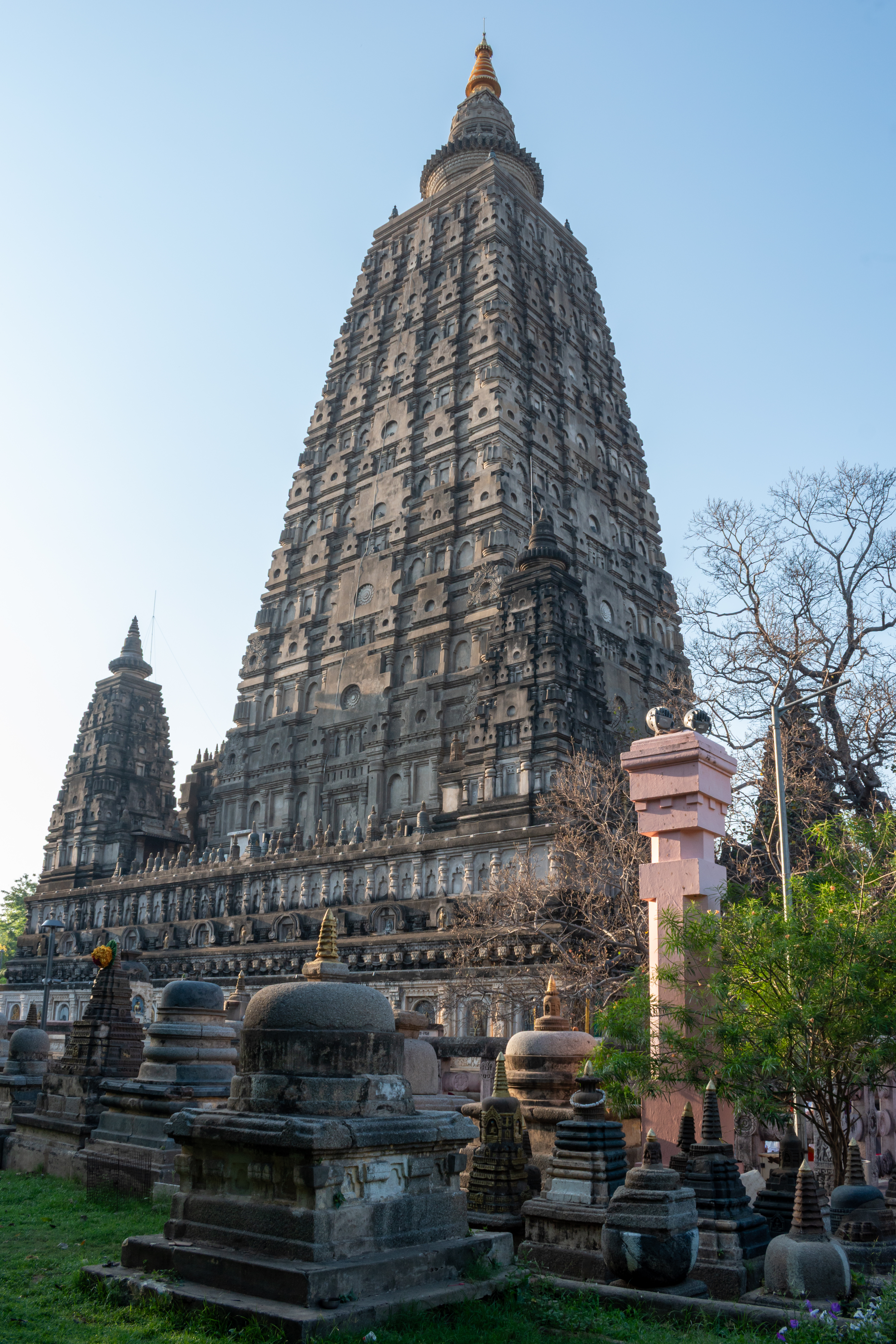

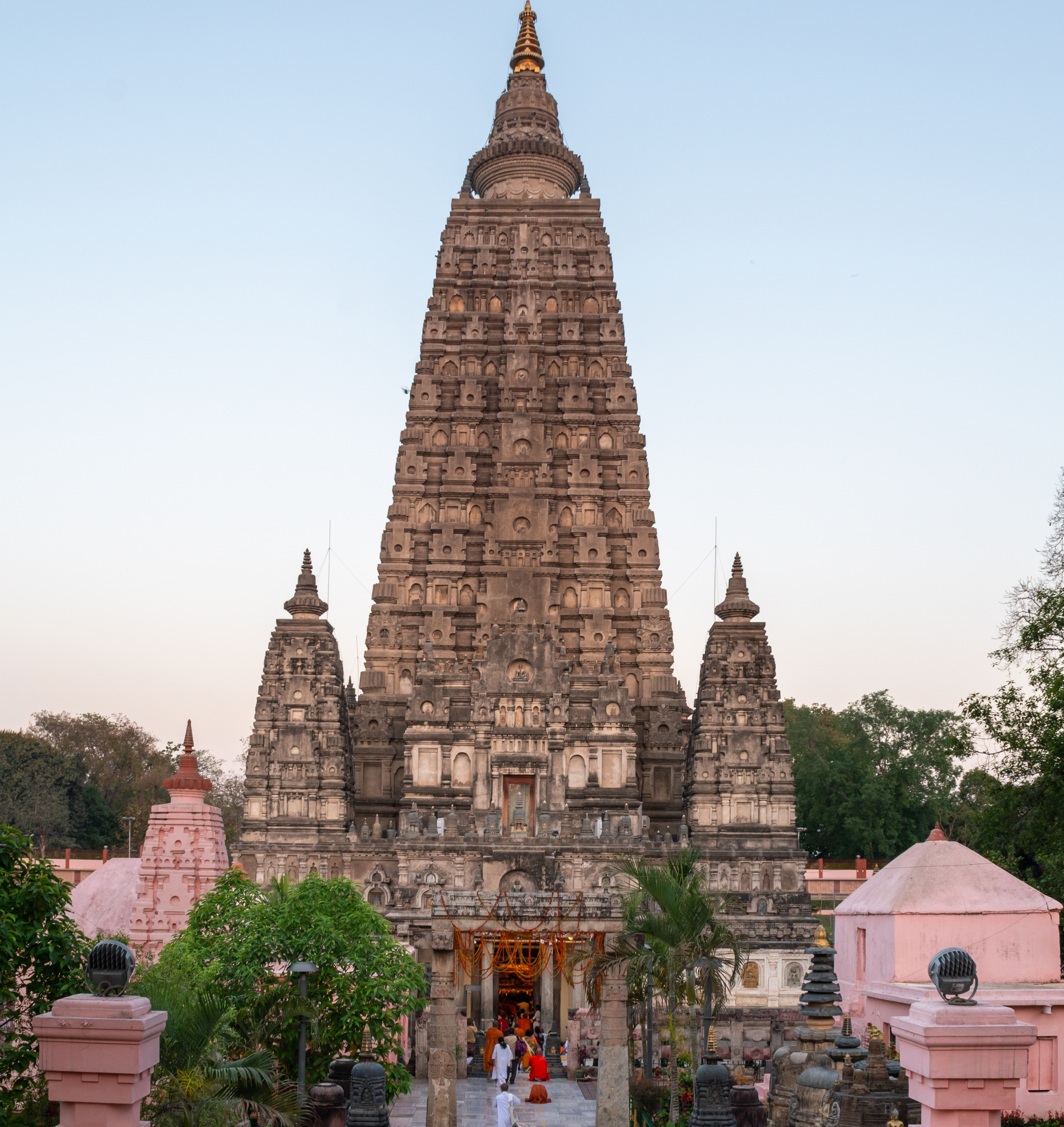

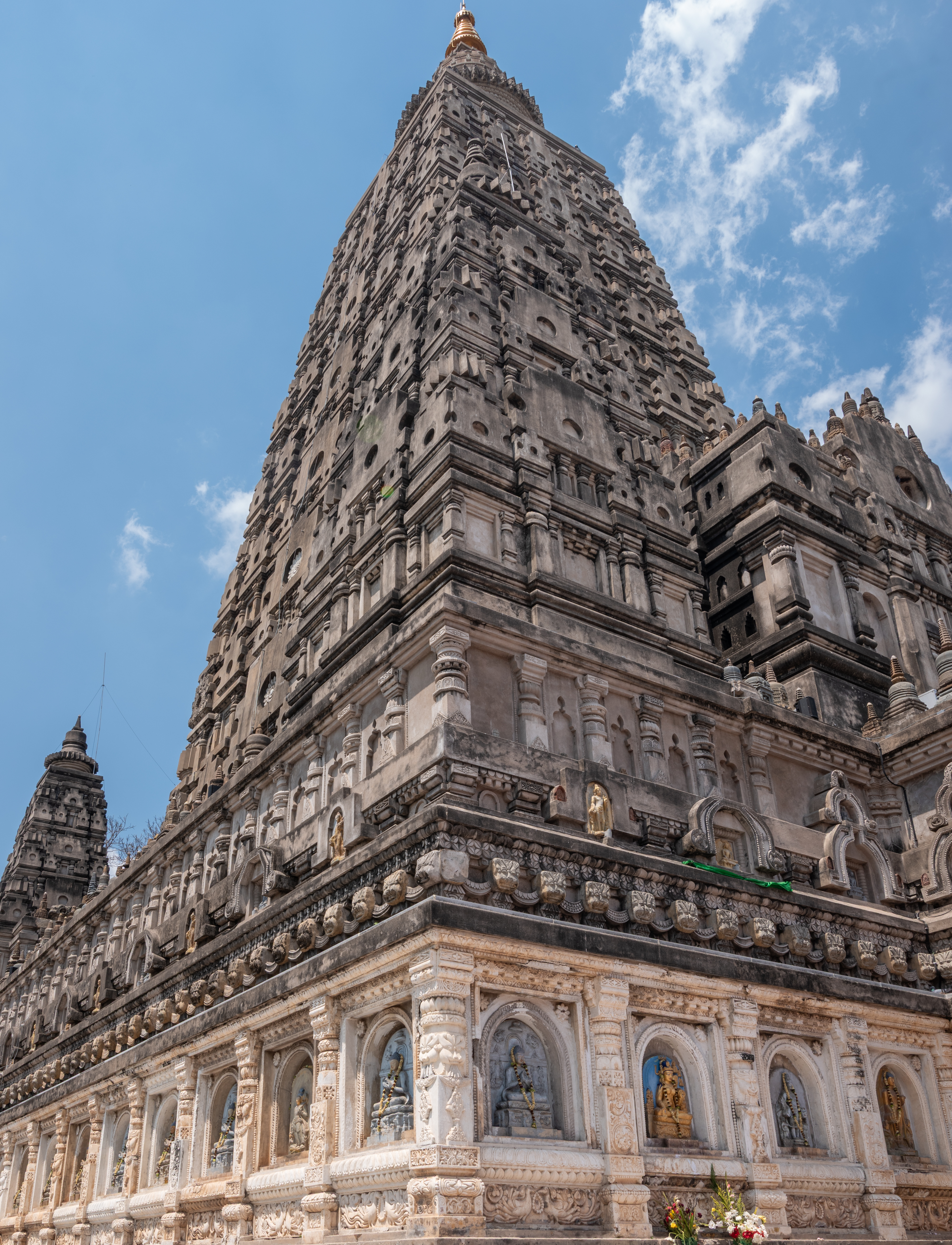

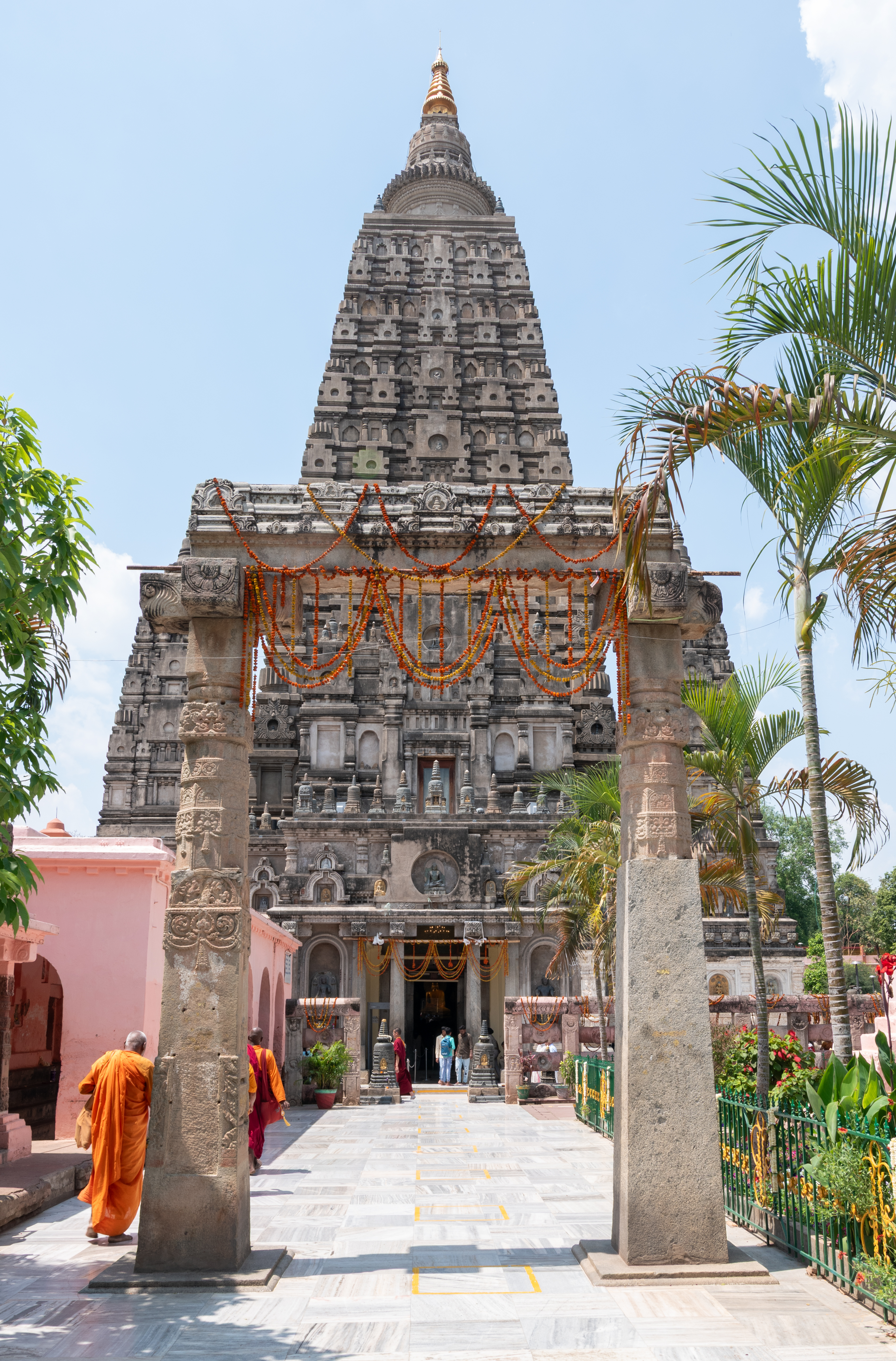

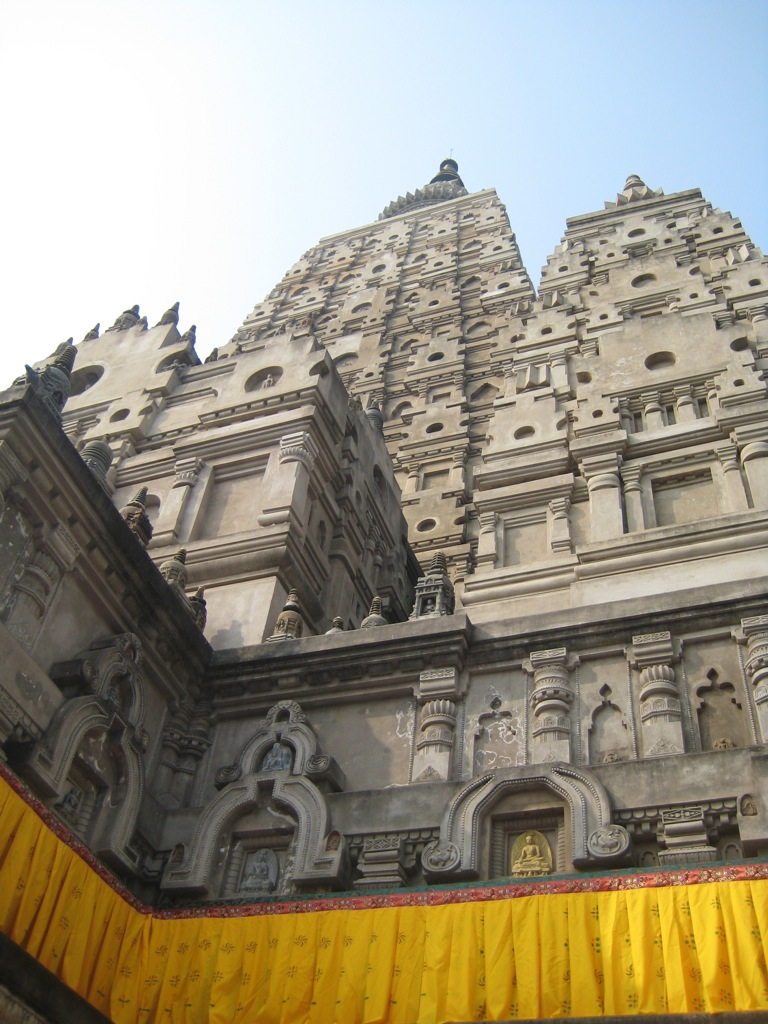

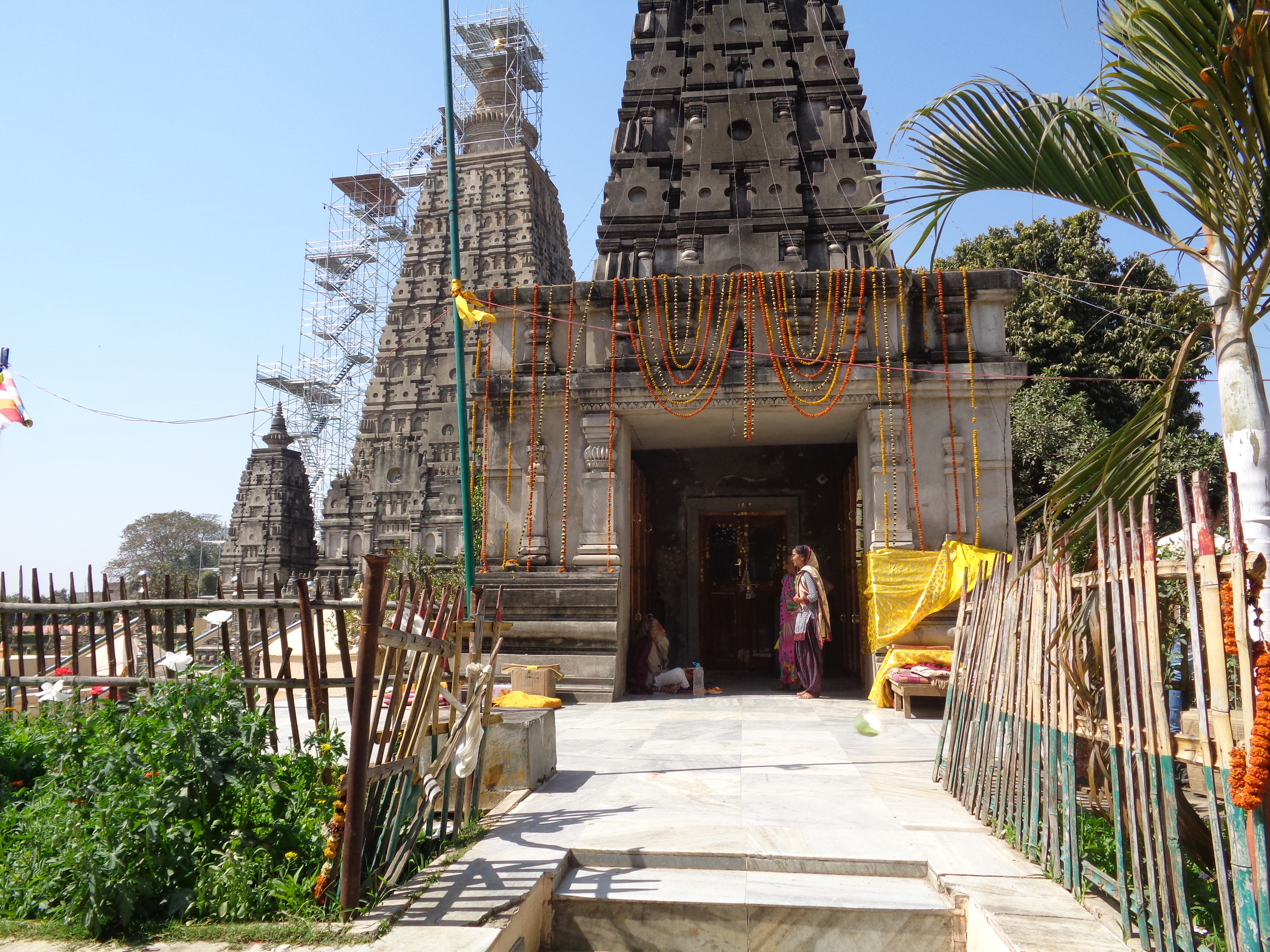

== Control of the site ==
For centuries before its re-"discovery" by Europeans, the temple was an active place of worship by Shaivas and Vaishnavas. In 1891, a campaign was initiated, seeking the return of control of the temple to Buddhists, over the objections of the Hindu mahant. Sir Edwin Arnold, author of The Light of Asia, started advocating for the renovation of the site and its return to Buddhist care. Arnold was directed towards this endeavour by Weligama Sri Sumangala Thera. In 1891, Anagarika Dharmapala was on a pilgrimage to the recently restored Mahabodhi Temple. Here he experienced a shock to find the temple in the hands of a Shaiva priest, the Buddha image transformed into a Hindu icon and Buddhists barred from worship. As a result, he began an agitation movement.

The Maha Bodhi Society at Colombo was founded in 1891 but its offices were soon moved to Calcutta the following year in 1892. One of its primary aims was the restoration to Buddhist control of the Mahabodhi Temple at Bodh Gaya, the chief of the four ancient Buddhist holy sites. To accomplish this, Dharmapala initiated a lawsuit against the Brahmin priests who had held control of the site for centuries. After a protracted struggle, this was successful only after Indian independence (1947) and sixteen years after Dharmapala's own death (1933), with the partial restoration of the site to the management of the Maha Bodhi Society in 1949. It was then the temple management of Bodh Gaya was entrusted to a committee composed of equal numbers of Hindus and Buddhists. The campaign was partially successful in 1949 when control passed from the Hindu mahant to the state government of Bihar, which established a Bodh Gaya Temple Management Committee (BTMC) under the Bodh Gaya Temple Act of 1949. The committee has nine members, a majority of whom, including the chairman, must by law be Hindus. Mahabodhi's first head monk under the management committee was Anagarika Munindra, a Bengali man who had been an active member of the Maha Bodhi Society.

In 2013, the Bihar government amended the Bodh Gaya Temple Act of 1949, allowing for a non-Hindu to head the temple committee. Also in 2013, one thousand Indian Buddhists protested at the Mahabodhi Temple site to demand that control over it be given to Buddhists. These Buddhists included such leaders as Bhante Anand (president of the Akhil Bharatiya Bhikkhu Mahasangh, an influential body of monks), as well as the president of the Bodh Gaya Mukti Andolan Samiti. Additionally, Japanese-born Surai Sasai emerged as an important Buddhist leader in India as both he and Bhante Anand became two of the most well-known leaders of this campaign to free the temple from Hindu control.

== Current status and management ==
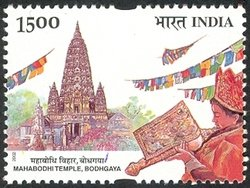
Bauddha Mahotsav - Mahbodhi Temple BodhgayaStamp of India - 2002

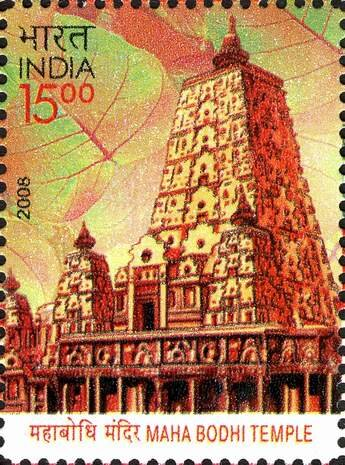
Maha Bodhi Temple 2008 stamp

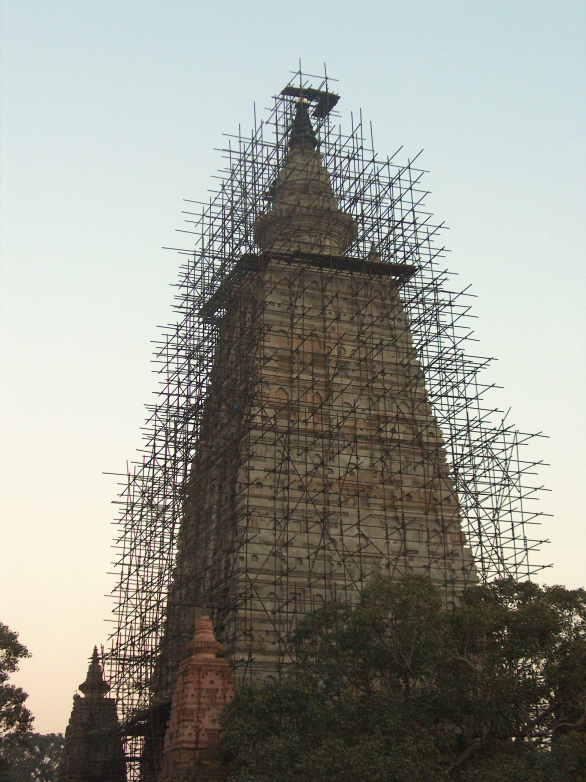
The temple undergoing repairs (from January, 2006)

The Bihar state government assumed responsibility for the protection, management, and monitoring of the temple and its properties when India gained its independence. Pursuant to the Bodh Gaya Temple Act of 1949, such responsibilities are shared with the Bodhgaya Temple Management Committee, and an advisory board. The committee, which serves for a three-year term, must by law consist of four Buddhist and four Hindu representatives, including the head of Sankaracharya Math monastery as an ex-officio Hindu member. A 2013 Amendment to the Bodhgaya Temple Management Act allows the Gaya District Magistrate to be the chairman of the committee, even if he is not Hindu. The advisory board consists of the governor of Bihar and twenty to twenty-five other members, half of them from foreign Buddhist countries.

In June 2002, the Mahabodhi Temple became a UNESCO World Heritage Site. All finds of religious artefacts in the area are legally protected under the Treasure Trove Act of 1878.

The temple's head monk, Bhikkhu Bodhipala, resigned in 2007 after he was charged with cutting the branches of Mahabodhi tree on a regular basis and selling them to foreigners for significant amounts of money. A newspaper alleged that wealthy Thai buyers bought a branch with the cooperation of senior members of the temple's management committee. While the temple's spokesman stated that botanists had pruned the tree, the Bihar home secretary ordered the tree examined. A criminal charge was filed against Bodhipala. If convicted, Bodhipala would be subject to at least 10 years' imprisonment.

Following the expiration of the committee's term in September 2007, Bihar's government delayed appointing a new Committee and the district magistrate administered the temple pending such appointment. Eventually, on May 16, 2008, the government announced the appointment of a new Temple Management Committee.

As of June 2017, the Temple's head monk was Bhikkhu Chalinda.

== Recent events ==
=== Gilding project ===
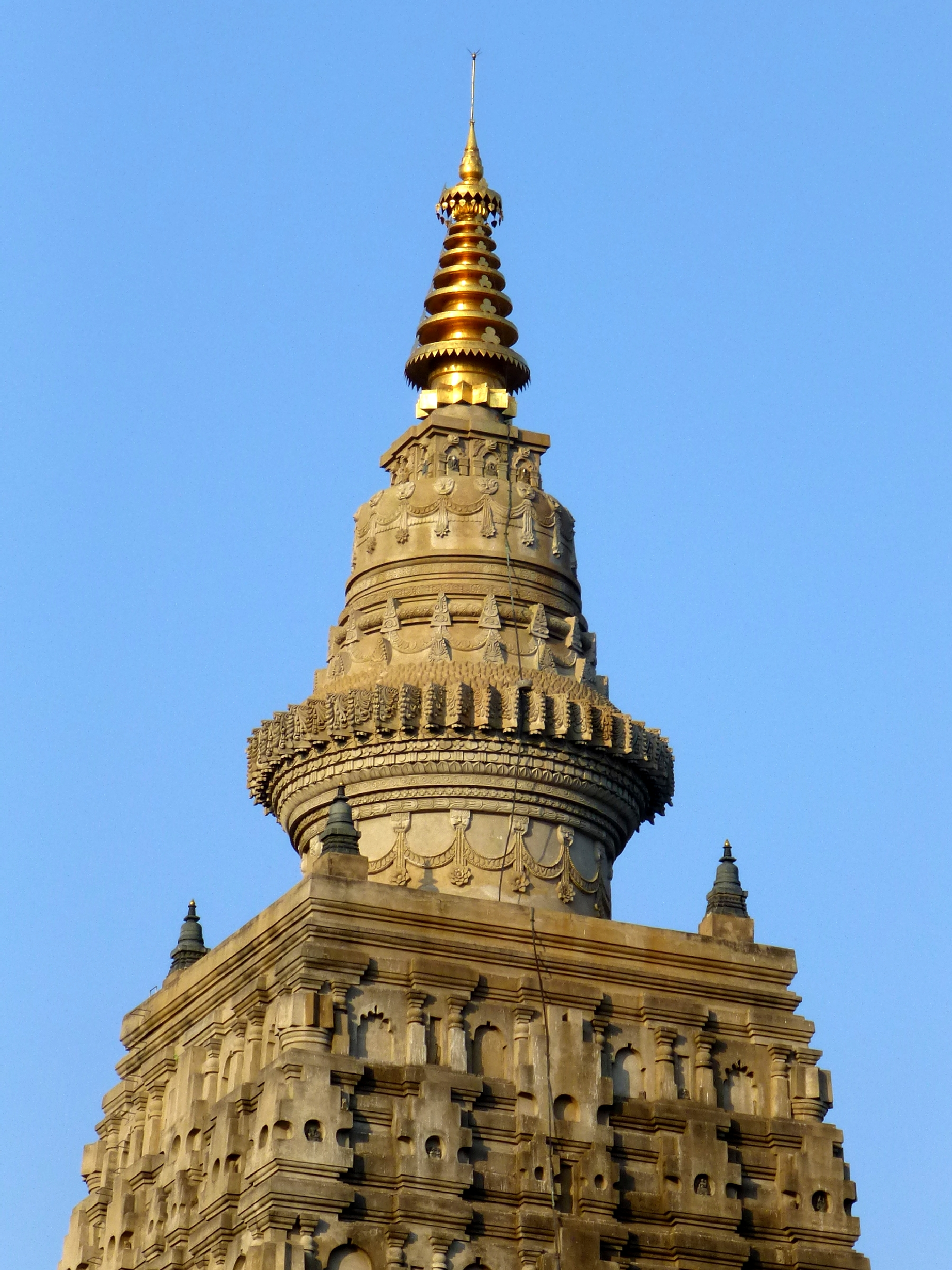
The gilded finial atop the stupa's pyramidal structure.

In early 2013, Thai organisers launched a fundraising and planning initiative to gild the temple's upper finial/spire with gold, noting that the work would require permissions from Indian authorities before it could proceed and estimating the project would require around 200 kg of gold.

In August 2013, Bihar chief minister Nitish Kumar said the Archaeological Survey of India (ASI) had accepted a proposal to decorate the Mahabodhi Temple's dome with gold, subject to terms and conditions. News reports later described the project as being carried out under ASI supervision using gold donations from Thailand, widely reported as 289 kg (often rounded in headlines to "nearly 300 kg"), including donations attributed to the Thai king and Thai devotees; one report put the amount at 280 kg. The Hindustan Times report said only the top 18 feet of the 180-foot-high structure would be covered with gold after preparatory chemical treatment.

=== 2013 attack ===
On 7 July 2013, ten low-intensity bombs exploded in the temple complex, injuring 5 people. One bomb was near the statue of Buddha and another was near the Mahabodhi tree. Three unexploded bombs were also found and defused. The blasts took place between 5.30 a.m. and 6.00 a.m. The main temple was undamaged. The Intelligence Bureau of India may have alerted state officials of possible threats around 15 days prior to the bombing. On 4 November 2013, the National Investigation Agency announced that the Islamic terrorist group Indian Mujahideen was responsible for the bombings.

== Replicas ==
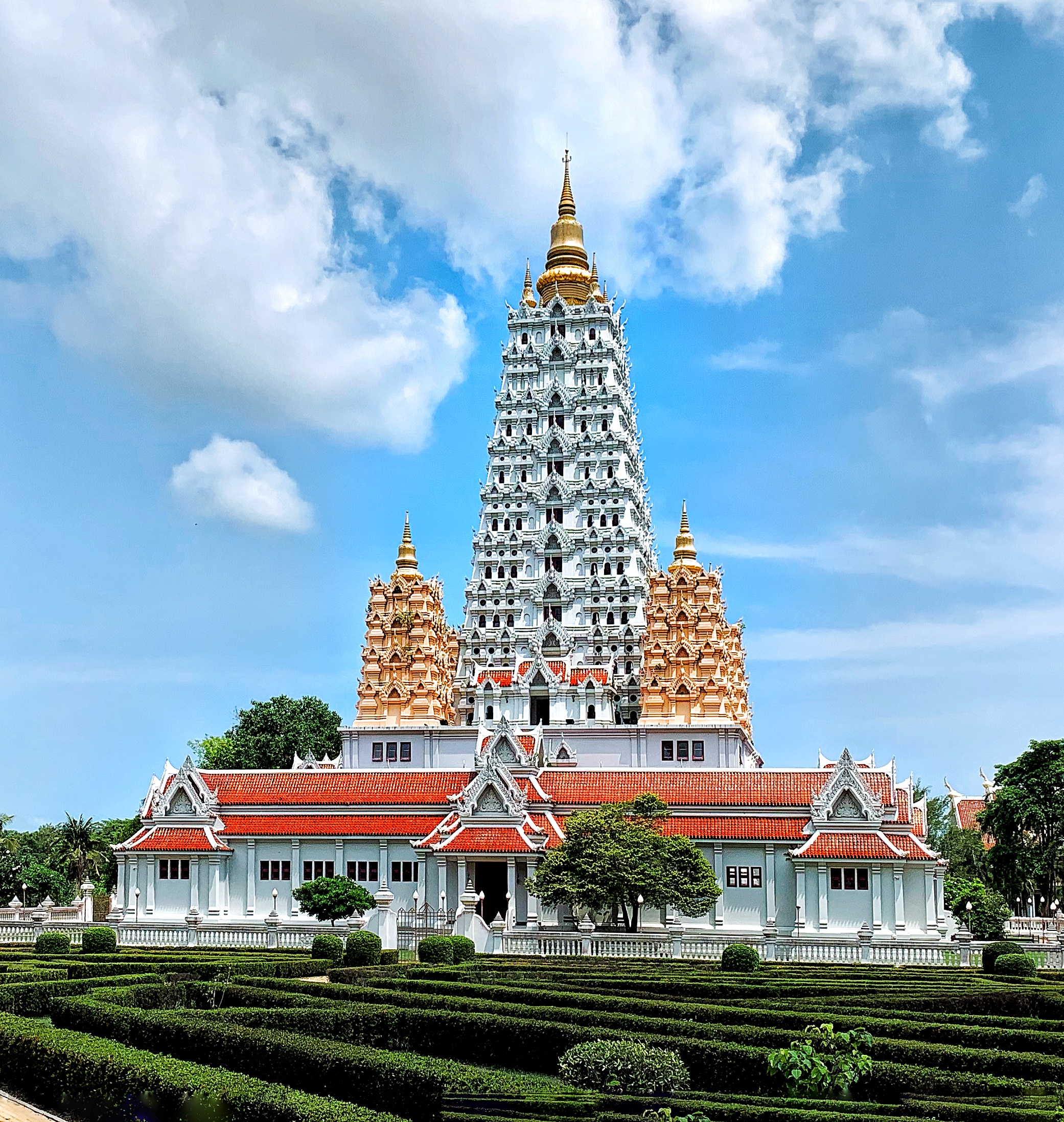
Bodh Gaya Chedi Replica at Wat Yansangwararam, Chonburi Province, Thailand

Mahabodhi Temple is one of the most replicated Buddhist structures, both as large buildings and miniatures.

- Zhenjue Temple, Beijing, China
- Mahabodhi Temple, Bagan, Myanmar
- Wat Chet Yot, Chiang Mai, Thailand
- Thatta Thattaha Maha Bawdi Pagoda, Myanmar
- Bodh Gaya Chedi Replica (Chedi Phutthakhaya Chamlong) in Wat Yansangwararam, Chonburi Province, Thailand

== See also ==
- List of tallest structures built before the 20th century
- Bodh Gaya Temple Act

== Sources ==
- Harle J.C., The Art and Architecture of the Indian Subcontinent, 1994, Yale University Press Pelican History of Art, ISBN 0300062176
- Michell, George, The Penguin Guide to the Monuments of India, Volume 1: Buddhist, Jain, Hindu, 1989, Penguin Books, ISBN 0140081445
- Sarao, KTS (2020). The History of Mahabodhi Temple at Bodh Gaya. Springer Nature. ISBN 9789811580673.
