= Giriyak =

- Town
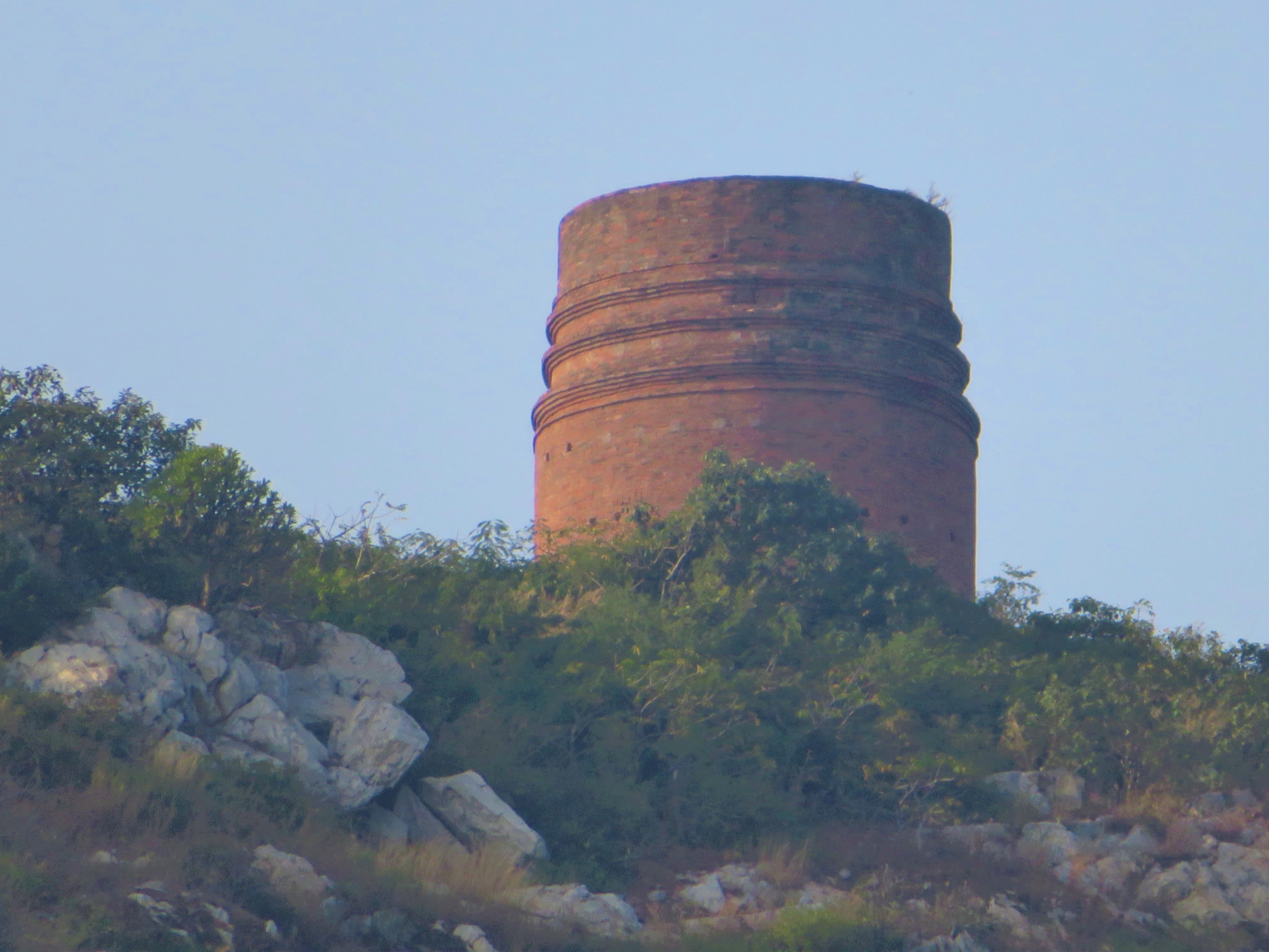
- Giriyak stupa is located in Giriyak community development block of Nalanda district, Patna division, Bihar, India

- Location in Bihar, India Giriyak (India)
- Coordinates: 25°01′40″N 85°31′42″E
- Country: India
- State: Bihar
- District: Nalanda

Languages
  - Official: Hindi
  - Unofficial: Magahi
- Time zone: UTC+5:30 (IST)
- PIN: 803109
- Rajgir: Nearest city

Giriyak is a village and community development block located on the bank of the Panchane River in Nalanda district of Bihar, India. It is located about 15 kilometres (9.3 miles) east of Rajgir, 26 kilometres (16 miles) south of Bihar Sharif, the district headquarters, and 95 kilometres (59 miles) southeast of Patna, the state capital.

Giriyak stupa — a Gupta-era Buddhist stupa — is located on the western side of the Panchane River, opposite the village of Giriyak.

== Demographics ==
At the time of the 2011 Census of India, the population Giriyak was 96,845, of which 50,124 are male and 46,721 are female.

== Transportation ==
NH 20 passes through the town connecting it with Pawapuri and Bihar Sharif. State Highway SH 71 connects it with Rajgir and Barbigha.
