= Pagan Kingdom =

Polity in Myanmar (846–1297)

Coordinates: 21°10′20″N 94°51′37″E

Pagan Kingdom ပုဂံပြည်
- 849–1297
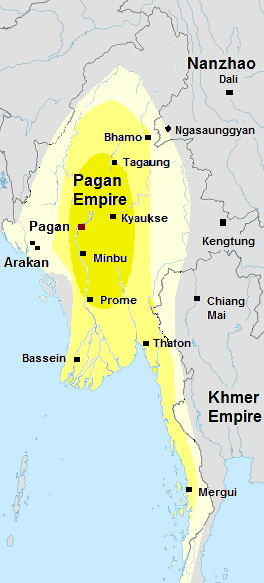
- Pagan empire, c. 1210. Pagan Kingdom during Sithu II's reign. Kengtung and Chiang Mai are also claimed to be part of the empire according to the Burmese chronicles. Pagan incorporated key ports of lower Burma into its core administration by the 13th century.
- Status: Kingdom, Empire
- Capital: Pagan (849–1287)
- Common languages: Old Burmese, Mon, Pyu
- Religion: Theravada Buddhism, Mahayana Buddhism, Hinduism, Animism
- Government: Monarchy
  - 1044–1077: Anawrahta
  - 1084–1112: Kyansittha
  - 1112–1167: Sithu I
  - 1174–1211: Sithu II
  - 1256–1287: Narathihapate
- Legislature: None
- Historical era: Middle Ages
  - Burmese calendar begins: 23 March 640
  - Founding of kingdom: 23 December 849
  - creation of Burmese alphabet: 984 and 1035
  - Pagan Kingdom's expansion: 1050s–60s
  - Peak: 1174–1250
  - First Mongol invasion: 1277–87
  - Myinsaing takeover: 17 December 1297
  - Second Mongol invasion: 1300–01

Population
  - c. 1210: 1.5 to 2 million
- Currency: Kyat
Preceded by
Pyu city-states
Mon city-states
Succeeded by
Yuan dynasty
Myinsaing kingdom
Hanthawaddy kingdom
Möng Mao
Shan States

The Pagan Kingdom (Burmese: ပုဂံပြည် Băgam pyi [bəɡàɰ̃ pji]; lit. 'Bagan state'), also called Bagan Empire (ပုဂံဧကရာဇ်နိုင်ငံတော်) or the First Burmese Empire, was the first Burmese kingdom to unify the regions that would later constitute modern-day Myanmar. Pagan's 250-year rule over the Irrawaddy valley and its periphery laid the foundation for the ascent of Burmese language and culture, the spread of Bamar ethnicity in Upper Myanmar, and the growth of Theravada Buddhism in Myanmar and in mainland Southeast Asia.

The kingdom grew out of a small 9th-century settlement at Pagan by the Mranma people, the predecessor to the modern Bamar ethnicity. Over the next two hundred years, the small principality gradually grew to absorb its surrounding regions until the 1050s and 1060s when King Anawrahta founded the Pagan Empire, presumably for the first time unifying under one polity the Irrawaddy valley and its periphery. By the late 12th century, Anawrahta's successors had extended their influence farther to the south into the upper Malay Peninsula, to the east at least to the Salween River, in the farther north to below the current China border, and to the west, in northern Arakan and the Chin Hills. In the 12th and 13th centuries, Pagan, alongside the Khmer Empire, was one of two main empires in mainland Southeast Asia.

The Burmese language and culture gradually became dominant in the upper Irrawaddy valley, eclipsing the Pyu, Mon and Pali norms by the late 12th century. Theravada Buddhism slowly began to spread to the village level although Vajrayana, Mahayana, Brahmanic, and animist practices remained heavily entrenched at all social strata. Pagan's rulers built over 10,000 Buddhist temples in the Bagan Archaeological Zone of which over 2,000 remain. The wealthy donated tax-free land to religious authorities.

The kingdom went into decline in the mid-13th century as the continuous growth of tax-free religious wealth by the 1280s had severely affected the crown's ability to retain the loyalty of courtiers and military servicemen. This ushered in a vicious circle of internal disorders and external challenges by the Arakanese, Mons, Mongols and Shans. Repeated Mongol invasions (1277–1301) toppled the four-century-old kingdom in 1287. The collapse was followed by 250 years of political fragmentation that lasted well into the 16th century.

== Names ==
The classical name for the kingdom in Pali was Arimaddanapura (meaning "Foe-Crushing City"). The Burmese name for the kingdom is ပုဂံ (translit. pugam), which is usually rendered as Pagan or Bagan in English. Arimaddana is attested in the Ceylon Pāli chronicles, identified as the city of Pagan in Burma (Rāmañña) (Bode: op. cit., 14). During the time of Parakkamabāhu I of Ceylon, the King of Arimaddana quarrelled with him, ill-treated his envoys, and seized by force a princess sent from Ceylon to Kamboja. Parakkama sent a punitive expedition under the Damilādhikāri ādicca, who reduced the country to subjection (Cv. lxxvi. 10-75).

Later Vijayabāhu II of Ceylon entered into friendly negotiations with the ruler of Arimaddana, and wrote him a letter in the Māgadha language composed by himself. As a result, a friendly treaty was made between them which also resulted in closer contact between the monks of the two countries (Cv. lxxx. 6-8).

According to some authorities, quoted by Minayeff (Recherches sur Bouddhisme, p. 70), the city was full of learned women．The Gandhavamsa (p. 67) mentions a list of twenty-three teachers who wrote their works in Arimaddana. From this context it appears that Arimaddana was known also as Pukkāma (Pukkāmasankhāte Arimaddananagare)．This is supported by evidence from elsewhere (Forchhammer: Jardine Prize Essay, pp. 29, 32. Ind. Ant. 1893, p. 17). It was a minister in Arimaddana who wrote the Nyāsappadīpatīkā (Svd. v. 1240). Arimaddana was also the city of birth of the Thera Chapata (Svd. v. 1247).

== History ==
=== Origins ===
The origins of the Pagan Kingdom have been reconstructed using archaeological evidence as well as the Burmese chronicle tradition. Considerable differences exist between the views of modern scholarship and various chronicle narratives.

==== Chronicle tradition ====
The local myths and chronicles written down in the 18th century trace its origins to 167 AD, when Pyusawhti founded the dynasty at Pagan (Bagan). But the 19th-century Glass Palace Chronicle (Hmannan Yazawin) connects the dynasty's origins to the clan of the Buddha and the first Buddhist king Maha Sammata (မဟာ သမ္မတ).

The Glass Palace Chronicle traces the origins of the Pagan Kingdom to India during the 9th century BC, more than three centuries before the Buddha was born. Abhiraja (အဘိရာဇာ)of the Sakya clan (သကျ သာကီဝင် မင်းမျိုး) – the clan of the Buddha – left his homeland with followers in 850 BC after military defeat by the neighbouring kingdom of Panchala (ပဉ္စာလရာဇ်). They settled at Tagaung in present-day northern Myanmar and founded a kingdom. The chronicle does not claim that he had arrived in an empty land, only that he was the first king.

Abhiraja had two sons. The elder son Kanyaza Gyi (ကံရာဇာကြီး) ventured south, and in 825 BC founded his own kingdom in what is today Arakan. The younger son Kanyaza Nge (ကံရာဇာငယ်) succeeded his father, and was followed by a dynasty of 31 kings, and then another dynasty of 17 kings. Some three and a half centuries later, in 483 BC, scions of Tagaung founded yet another kingdom much farther down the Irrawaddy at Sri Ksetra, near modern Pyay (Prome). Sri Ksetra lasted nearly six centuries, and was succeeded in turn by the kingdom of Pagan. The Glass Palace Chronicle goes on to relate that around 107 AD, Thamoddarit (သမုဒ္ဒရာဇ်), nephew of the last king of Sri Ksetra, founded the city of Pagan (formally, Arimaddana-pura (အရိမဒ္ဒနာပူရ), lit. "the City that Tramples on Enemies"). The site reportedly was visited by the Buddha himself during his lifetime, and it was where he allegedly pronounced that a great kingdom would arise at this very location 651 years after his death. Thamoddarit was followed by a caretaker, and then Pyusawhti in 167 AD.

The chronicle narratives then merge, and agree that a dynasty of kings followed Pyusawhti. King Pyinbya (ပျဉ်ပြား) fortified the city in 849 AD.

==== Scholarly reconstruction ====
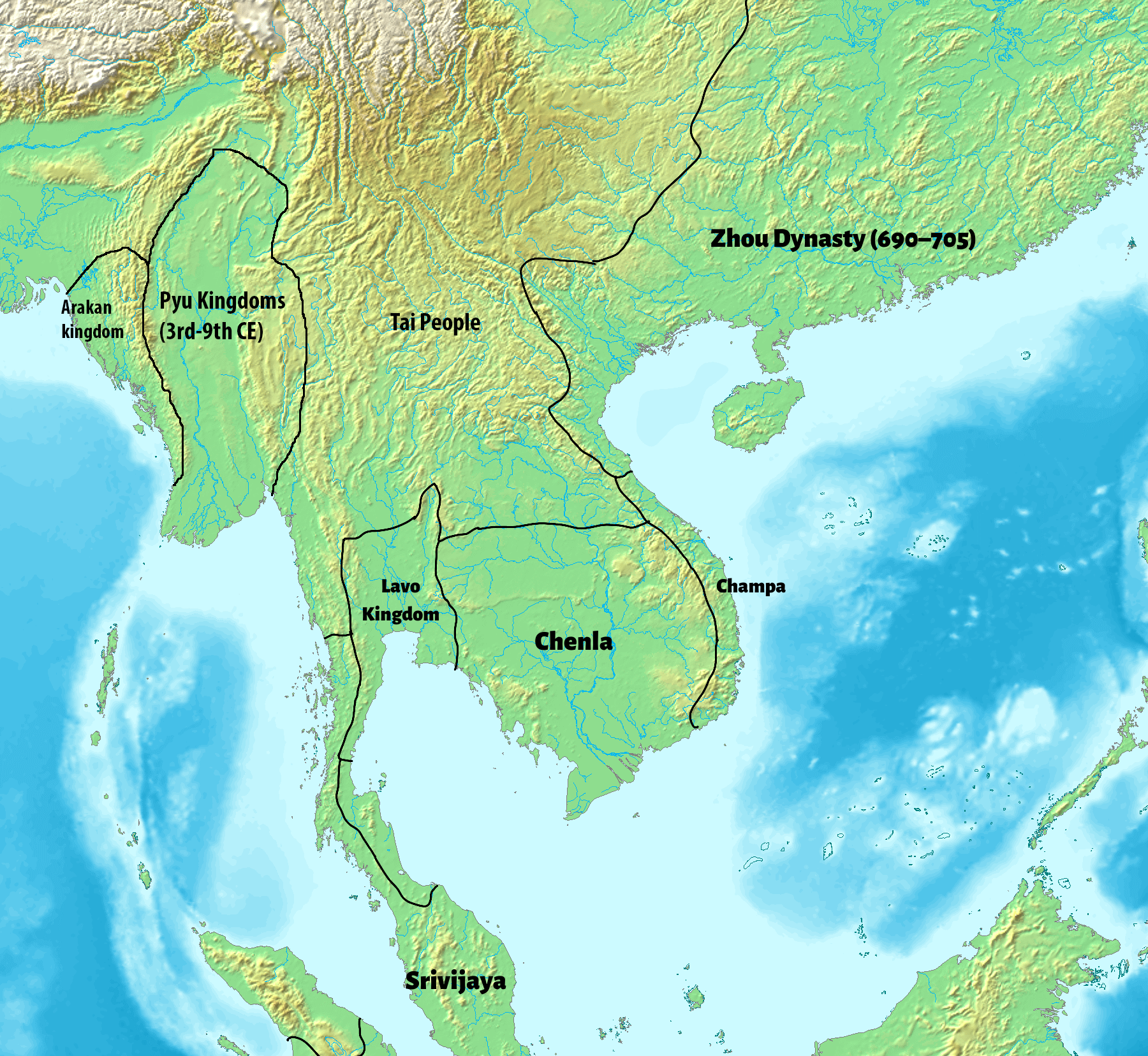
Southeast Asia around 700 CE

Modern scholarship holds that the Pagan dynasty was founded by the Mranma of the Nanzhao kingdom in the mid-to-late 9th century AD; that the earlier parts of the chronicle are the histories and legends of Pyu people, the earliest inhabitants of Myanmar of whom records are extant; and that Pagan kings had adopted the Pyu histories and legends as their own. Indeed, the Mranma and Pyu people became mixed after years of immigration and settlement.

The earliest archaeological evidence of civilisation dates to 11,000 BC. Archaeological evidence shows that as early as the 2nd century BC the Pyu had built water-management systems along secondary streams in central and northern parts of the Irrawaddy basin and had founded one of Southeast Asia's earliest urban centres. By the early centuries AD, several walled cities and towns, including Tagaung, the birthplace of the first Burman kingdom according to the chronicles, had emerged. The architectural and artistic evidence indicates the Pyu realm's contact with Indian culture by the 4th century AD. The city-states boasted kings and palaces, moats and massive wooden gates, and always 12 gates for each of the signs of the zodiac, one of the many enduring patterns that would continue until the British occupation. Sri Ksetra emerged as the premier Pyu city-state in the 7th century AD. Although the size of the city-states and the scale of political organisation grew during the 7th to early 9th centuries, no sizeable kingdom had yet emerged by the 9th century.

According to a reconstruction by G.H. Luce, the millennium-old Pyu realm came crashing down under repeated attacks by the Nanzhao kingdom of Yunnan between the 750s and 830s AD. Like that of the Pyu, the original home of the Burmans prior to Yunnan is believed to be in present-day Qinghai and Gansu provinces. After the Nanzhao attacks had greatly weakened the Pyu city-states, large numbers of Burman warriors and their families first entered the Pyu realm in the 830s and 840s, and settled at the confluence of the Irrawaddy and Chindwin rivers, perhaps to help the Nanzhao pacify the surrounding countryside. Indeed, the naming system of the early Pagan kings—Pyusawhti and his descendants for six generations—was identical to that of the Nanzhao kings where the last name of the father became the first name of the son. The chronicles date these early kings to between the 2nd and 5th centuries AD, scholars to between the 8th and 10th centuries CE. (A minority view led by Htin Aung contends that the arrival of Burmans may have been a few centuries earlier, perhaps the early 7th century. The earliest human settlement at Bagan is radiocarbon dated to c. 650 AD. But evidence is inconclusive to prove that it was specifically a Burman (and not just another Pyu) settlement.)

Thant Myint-U summarises that "the Nanzhao Empire had washed up on the banks of the Irrawaddy, and would find a new life, fused with an existing and ancient culture, to produce one of the most impressive little kingdoms of the medieval world. From this fusion would result the Burmese people, and the foundations of modern Burmese culture."

=== Early Pagan ===
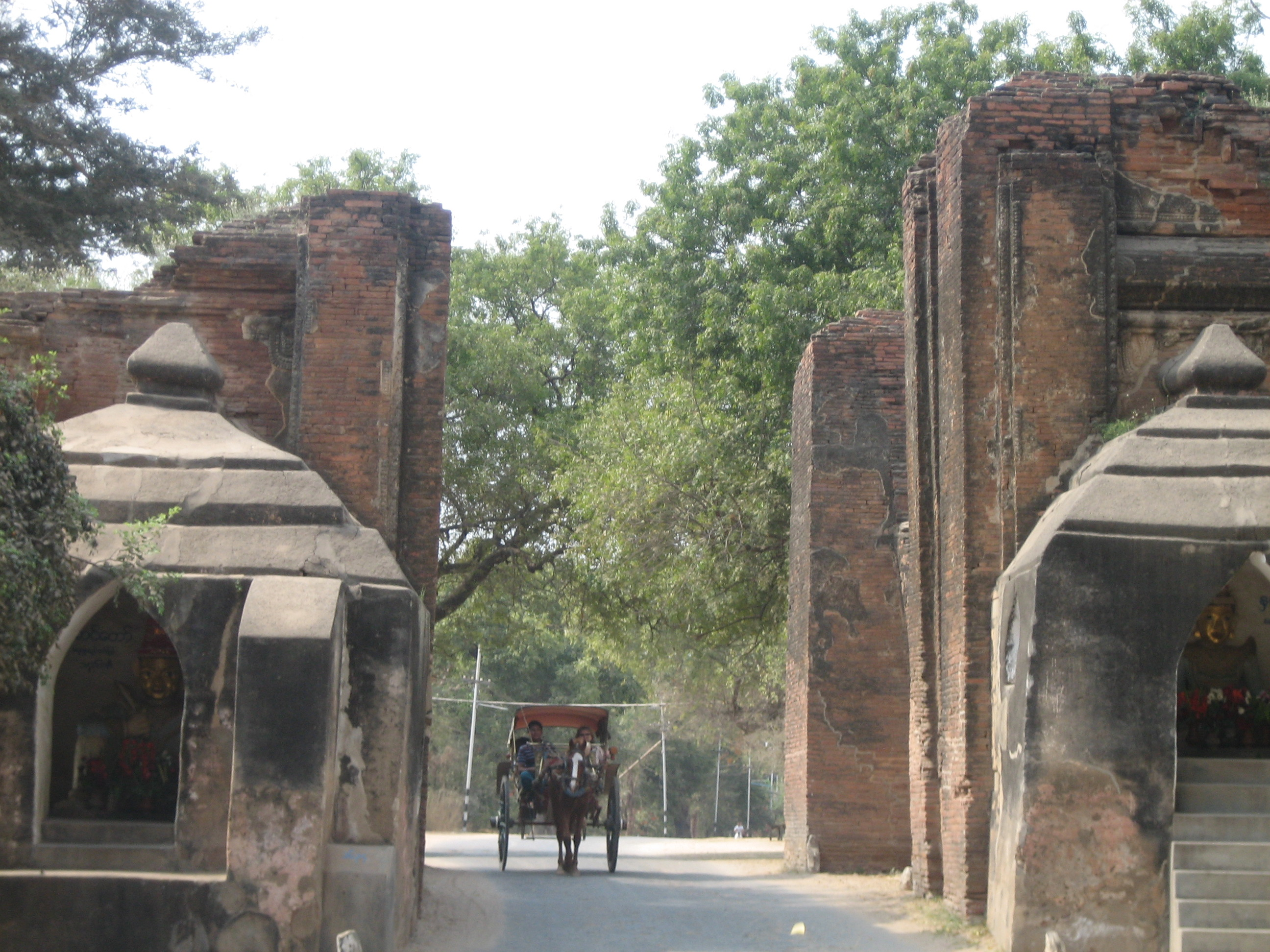
The Tharabha Gate at Bagan (Pagan), the only remaining section of the old walls. The main walls are dated to c. 1020 and the earliest pieces of the walls to c. 980.

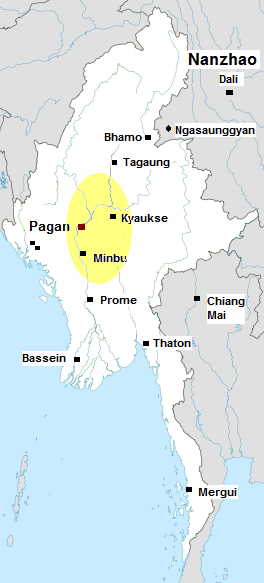
Pagan realm at Anawrahta's accession in 1044

Evidence shows that the actual pace of Burman migration into the Pyu realm was gradual. Indeed, no firm indications have been found at Sri Ksetra or at any other Pyu site to suggest a violent overthrow. Radiocarbon dating shows that human activity existed until c. 870 at Halin, the Pyu city reportedly destroyed by an 832 Nanzhao raid. The region of Pagan received waves of Burman settlements in the mid-to-late 9th century, and perhaps well into the 10th century. Though Hmannan states that Pagan was fortified in 849—or more accurately, 876 after the Hmannan dates are adjusted to King Anawrahta's inscriptionally verified accession date of 1044—the chronicle reported date is likely the date of foundation, not fortification. Radiocarbon dating of Pagan's walls points to c. 980 at the earliest. (If an earlier fortification did exist, it must have been constructed using less durable materials such as mud.) Likewise, inscriptional evidence of the earliest Pagan kings points to 956. The earliest mention of Pagan in external sources occurs in Song Chinese records, which report that envoys from Pagan visited the Song capital Bianjing in 1004. Mon inscriptions first mentioned Pagan in 1093, respectively.

Below is a partial list of early Pagan kings as reported by Hmannan, shown in comparison with Hmannan dates adjusted to 1044 and the list of Zatadawbon Yazawin (the Royal Horoscopes Chronicle). Prior to Anawrahta, inscriptional evidence exists thus far only for Nyaung-u Sawrahan and Kunhsaw Kyaunghpyu. The list starts from Pyinbya, the fortifier of Pagan according to Hmannan.

Monarch	Reign per Hmannan Yazawin / (adjusted)	per Zatadawbon Yazawin	Relationship
Pyinbya	846–878 / 874–906	846–876	
Tannet	878–906 / 906–934	876–904	Son
Sale Ngahkwe	906–915 / 934–943	904–934	Usurper
Theinhko	915–931 / 943–959	934–956	Son
Nyaung-u Sawrahan	931–964 / 959–992	956–1001	Usurper
Kunhsaw Kyaunghpyu	964–986 / 992–1014	1001–1021	Son of Tannet
Kyiso	986–992 / 1014–1020	1021–1038	Son of Nyaung-u Sawrahan
Sokkate	992–1017 / 1020–1044	1038–1044	Brother
Anawrahta	1017–1059 / 1044–1086	1044–1077	Son of Kunhsaw Kyaunghpyu

By the mid-10th century, Burmans at Pagan had expanded irrigation-based cultivation while borrowing extensively from the Pyus' predominantly Buddhist culture. Pagan's early iconography, architecture and scripts suggest little difference between early Burman and Pyu cultural forms. Moreover, no sharp ethnic distinction between Burmans and linguistically linked Pyus seems to have existed. The city was one of several competing city-states until the late 10th century when it grew in authority and grandeur. By Anawrahta's accession in 1044, Pagan had grown into a small principality—about 320 kilometres (200 mi) north to south and about 130 kilometres (81 mi) from east to west, comprising roughly the present districts of Mandalay, Meiktila, Myingyan, Kyaukse, Yamethin, Magwe, Sagaing, and the riverine portions of Minbu and Pakkoku. To the north lay the Nanzhao Kingdom, and to the east still largely uninhabited Shan Hills, to the south and the west Pyus, and farther south still, Mons. The size of the principality is about 6% of that of modern Burma/Myanmar.

=== Pagan Empire ===
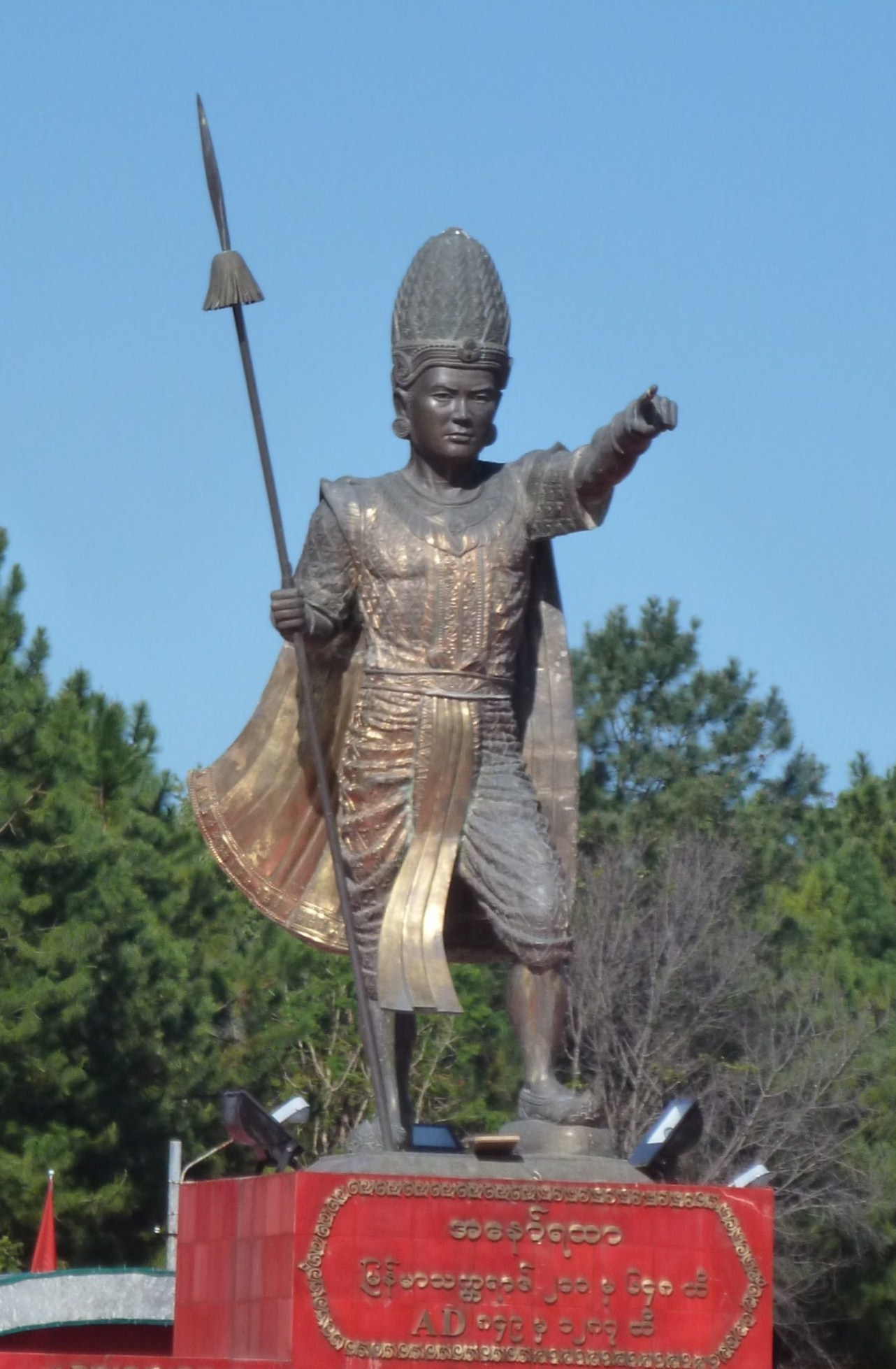
Statue of King Anawrahta in front of the DSA

In December 1044, a Pagan prince named Anawrahta came to power. Over the next three decades, he turned this small principality into the First Burmese Empire—the "charter polity" that formed the basis of modern-day Burma/Myanmar. Historically verifiable Burmese history begins with his accession.

==== Formation ====
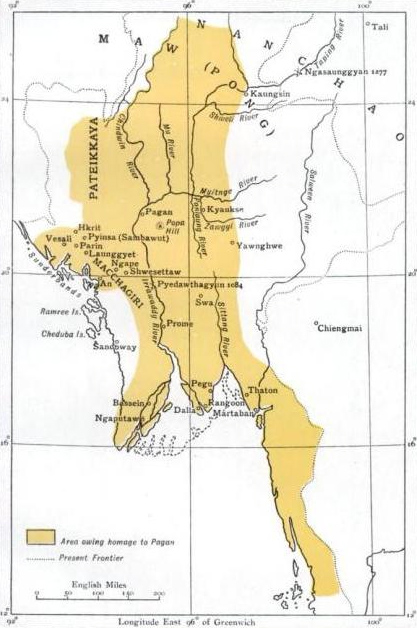
Pagan Empire under Anawrahta; Minimal, if any, control over Arakan; Pagan's suzerainty over Arakan confirmed four decades after his death.

Anawrahta proved an energetic king. His acts as king were to strengthen his kingdom's economic base. In the first decade of his reign, he invested much effort into turning the arid parched lands of central Myanmar into a rice granary, successfully building/enlarging weirs and canals, mainly around the Kyaukse district, east of Pagan. The newly irrigated regions attracted people, giving him an increased manpower base. He graded every town and village according to the levy it could raise. The region, known as Ledwin (လယ်တွင်း, lit. "rice country"), became the granary, the economic key of the north country. History shows that one who gained control of Kyaukse became kingmaker in Upper Myanmar.

By the mid-1050s, Anawrahta's reforms had turned Pagan into a regional power, and he looked to expand. Over the next ten years, he founded the Pagan Empire, the Irrawaddy valley at the core, surrounded by tributary states. Anawrahta began his campaigns in the nearer Shan Hills, and extended conquests to Lower Myanmar down to the Tenasserim coast to Phuket and North Arakan. Estimates of the extent of his empire vary greatly. The Burmese and Siamese chronicles report an empire which covered the present-day Myanmar and northern Thailand. The Siamese chronicles assert that Anawrahta conquered the entire Menam valley, and received tribute from the Khmer king. One Siamese chronicle states that Anawrahta's armies invaded the Khmer kingdom and sacked the city of Angkor, and another one goes so far as to say that Anawrahta even visited Java to receive his tribute.

Archaeological evidence however confirms only a smaller empire of the Irrawaddy valley and nearer periphery. Anawrahta's victory terracotta votive tablets emblazoned with his name in Sanskrit have been found along the Tenasserim coastline in the south, Katha in the north, Thazi in the east and Minbu in the west. In the northeast, a series of 43 forts Anawrahta established along the eastern foothills, of which 33 still exist as villages, reveal the effective extent of his authority. Moreover, most scholars attribute Pagan's control of peripheral regions (Arakan, Shan Hills) to later kings—Arakan to Alaungsithu, and cis-Salween Shan Hills to Narapatisithu. (Even those latter-day kings may not have had more than nominal control over the farther peripheral regions. For example, some scholars such as Victor Lieberman argue that Pagan did not have any "effective authority" over Arakan.)

At any rate, all scholars accept that during the 11th century, Pagan consolidated its hold of Upper Burma, and established its authority over Lower Burma. The emergence of Pagan Empire would have a lasting impact on Burmese history as well as the history of mainland Southeast Asia. The conquest of Lower Burma checked the Khmer Empire's encroachment into the Tenasserim coast, secured control of the peninsular ports, which were transit points between the Indian Ocean and China, and facilitated growing cultural exchange with the external world: Mons of Lower Burma, India and Ceylon. Equally important was Anawrahta's conversion to Theravada Buddhism from his native Ari Buddhism. The Burmese king provided the Buddhist school, which had been in retreat elsewhere in South Asia and Southeast Asia, a much needed reprieve and a safe shelter. By the 1070s, Pagan had emerged as the main Theravada stronghold. In 1071, it helped to restart the Theravada Buddhism in Ceylon whose Buddhist clergy had been wiped out by the Cholas. Another key development according to traditional scholarship was the creation of the Burmese alphabet from the Mon script in 1058, one year after the conquest of Thaton.

==== Cultural synthesis and economic growth ====
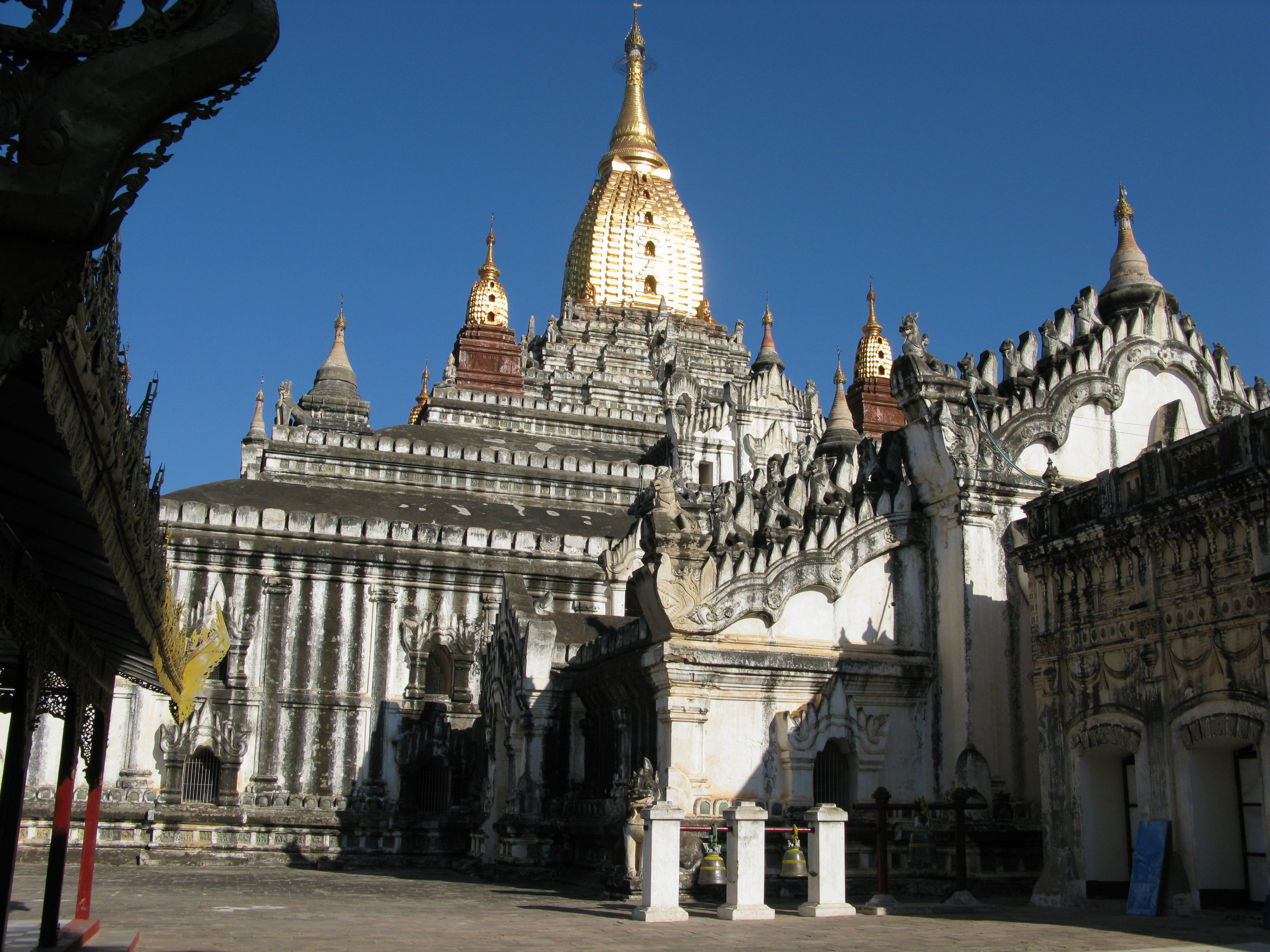
The Ananda Temple

Anawrahta was followed by a line of able kings who cemented Pagan's place in history. Pagan entered a golden age that would last for the next two centuries. Aside from a few occasional rebellions, the kingdom was largely peaceful during the period. King Kyansittha (r. 1084–1112) successfully melded the diverse cultural influences introduced into Pagan by Anawrahta's conquests. He patronised Mon scholars and artisans who emerged as the intellectual elite. He appeased the Pyus by linking his genealogy to the real and mythical ancestors of Sri Ksetra, the symbol of the Pyu golden past, and by calling the kingdom Pyu, even though it had been ruled by a Burman ruling class. He supported and favoured Theravada Buddhism while tolerating other religious groups. To be sure, he pursued these policies all the while maintaining the Burman military rule. By the end of his 28-year reign, Pagan had emerged a major power alongside the Khmer Empire in Southeast Asia, recognised as a sovereign kingdom by the Chinese Song dynasty, and the Indian Chola dynasty. Several diverse elements—art, architecture, religion, language, literature, ethnic plurality—had begun to synthesize.

Pagan's rise continued under Alaungsithu (r. 1112–1167), who focused on standardising administrative and economic systems. The king, also known as Sithu I, actively expanded frontier colonies and built new irrigation systems throughout the kingdom. He also introduced standardised weights and measures throughout the country to assist administration as well as trade. The standardisation provided an impetus for the monetisation of Pagan's economy, the full impact of which however would not be felt until later in the 12th century. The kingdom prospered from increased agricultural output as well as from inland and maritime trading networks. Much of the wealth was devoted to temple building. Temple building projects, which began in earnest during Kyansittha's reign, became increasingly grandiose, and began to transition into a distinctively Burman architectural style from earlier Pyu and Mon norms. By the end of Sithu I's reign, Pagan enjoyed a more synthesised culture, an efficient government and a prosperous economy. However a corresponding growth in population also put pressure on "the fixed relationship between productive land and population", forcing the later kings to expand.

==== Zenith ====
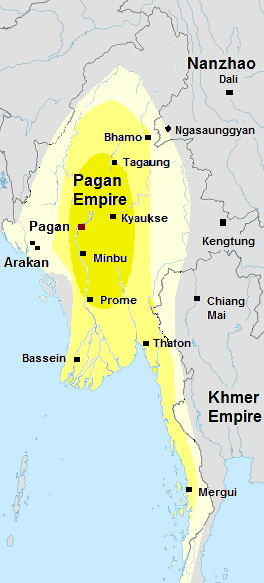
Pagan Empire during Sithu II's reign. Burmese chronicles also claim Kengtung and Chiang Mai. Core areas shown in darker yellow. Peripheral areas in light yellow. Pagan incorporated key ports of Lower Myanmar into its core administration by the 13th century

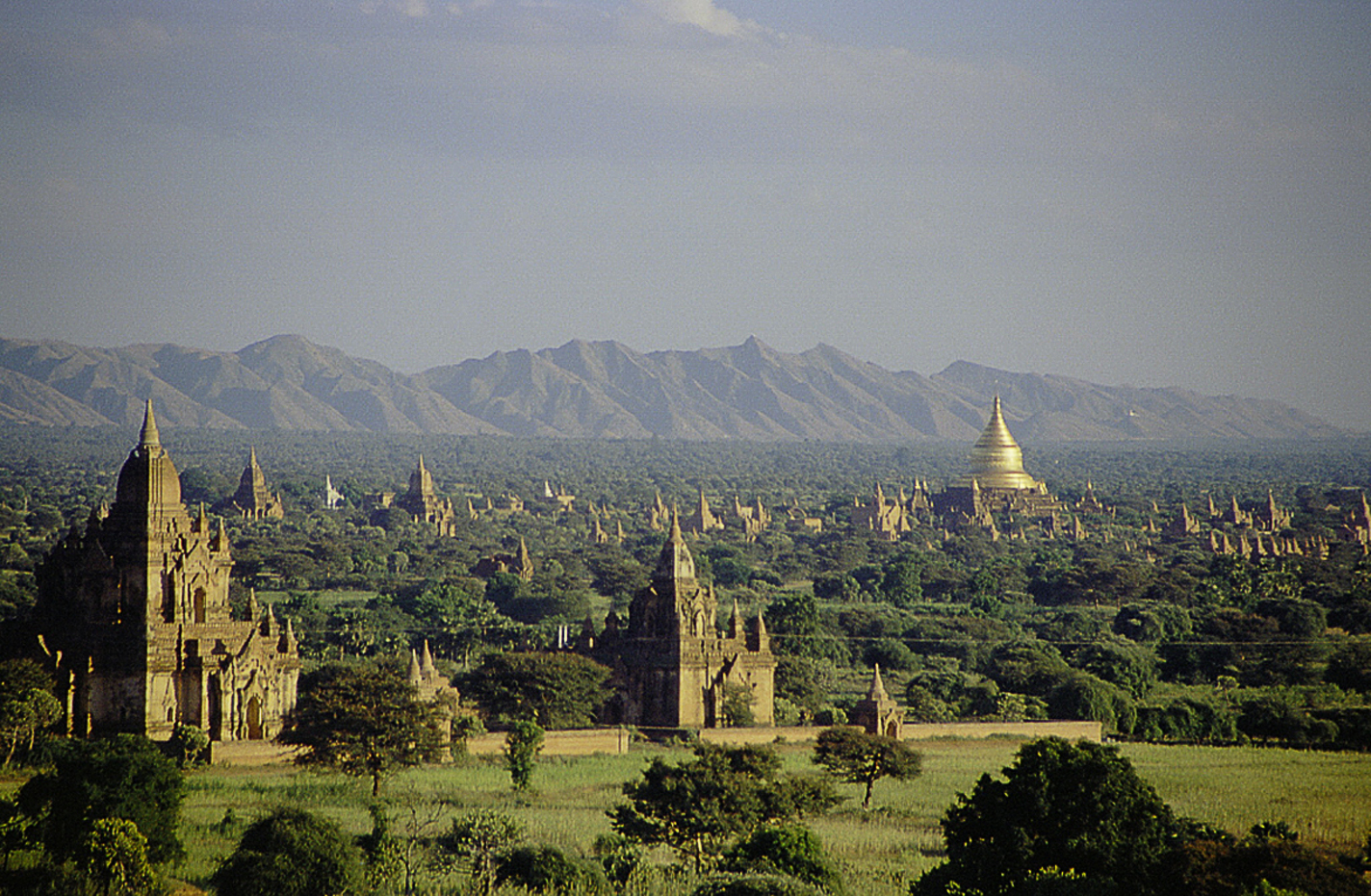
Pagan plains today

Pagan reached the height of political and administrative development during the reigns of Narapatisithu (Sithu II; r. 1174–1211) and Htilominlo (r. 1211–1235). The Sulamani Temple, Gawdawpalin Temple, Mahabodhi Temple, and Htilominlo Temple were built during their reigns. The kingdom's borders expanded to its greatest extent. Military organisation and success reached their zenith. Monumental architecture achieved a qualitative and quantitative standard that subsequent dynasties tried to emulate but never succeeded in doing. The court finally developed a complex organisation that became the model for later dynasties. The agricultural economy reached its potential in Upper Myanmar. The Buddhist clergy, the sangha, enjoyed one of its most wealthy periods. Civil and criminal laws were codified in the vernacular, Burmese, to become the basic jurisprudence for subsequent ages.

Sithu II formally founded the Palace Guards in 1174, the first extant record of a standing army, and pursued an expansionist policy. Over his 27-year reign, Pagan's influence reached further south to the Strait of Malacca, at least to the Salween river in the east and below the current China border in the farther north. (Burmese chronicles also claim trans-Salween Shan states, including Kengtung and Chiang Mai.) Continuing his grandfather Sithu I's policies, Sithu II expanded the agricultural base of the kingdom with new manpower from the conquered areas, ensuring the needed wealth for a growing royalty and officialdom. Pagan dispatched governors to supervise more closely ports in Lower Myanmar and the peninsula. In the early 13th century, Pagan, alongside the Khmer Empire, was one of two main empires in mainland Southeast Asia.

His reign also saw the rise of Burmese culture which finally emerged from the shadows of Mon and Pyu cultures. With the Burman leadership of the kingdom now unquestioned, the term Mranma (Burmans) was openly used in Burmese language inscriptions. Burmese became the primary written language of the kingdom, replacing Pyu and Mon. His reign also saw the realignment of Burmese Buddhism with Ceylon's Mahavihara school. The Pyus receded into the background, and by the early 13th century, had largely assumed the Burman ethnicity.

==== Decline ====
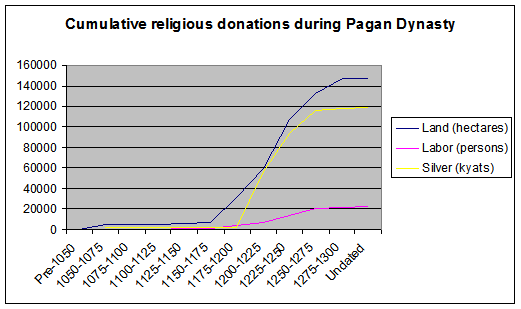
Cumulative donations to the Sangha in 25-year periods

Sithu II's success in state building created stability and prosperity throughout the kingdom. His immediate successors Htilominlo and Kyaswa (r. 1235–1249) were able to live off the stable and bountiful conditions he passed on with little state-building on their part. Htilomino hardly did any governing. A devout Buddhist and scholar, the king gave up the command of the army, and left administration to a privy council of ministers, the forebear of the Hluttaw. But the seeds of Pagan's decline were sowed during this seemingly idyllic period. The state had stopped expanding, but the practice of donating tax-free land to religion had not. The continuous growth of tax-free religious wealth greatly reduced the tax base of the kingdom. Indeed, Htilominlo was the last of the temple builders although most of his temples were in remote lands not in the Pagan region, reflecting the deteriorating state of royal treasury.

By the mid-13th century, the problem had worsened considerably. The Upper Myanmar heartland over which Pagan exercised most political control had run out of easily reclaimed irrigable tracts. Yet their fervent desire to accumulate religious merit for better reincarnations made it impossible for Pagan kings to halt entirely their own or other courtiers' donations. The crown did try to reclaim some of these lands by periodically purging the clergy in the name of Buddhist purification, and seizing previously donated lands. Although some of the reclamation efforts were successful, powerful Buddhist clergy by and large successfully resisted such attempts. Ultimately, the rate of reclamation fell behind the rate at which such lands were dedicated to the sangha. (The problem was exacerbated to a smaller degree by powerful ministers, who exploited succession disputes and accumulated their own lands at the expense of the crown.) By 1280, between one and two-thirds of Upper Myanmar's cultivatable land had been donated to religion. Thus the throne lost resources needed to retain the loyalty of courtiers and military servicemen, inviting a vicious circle of internal disorders and external challenges by Mons, Mongols and Shans.

=== Fall ===
==== Mongol invasions ====
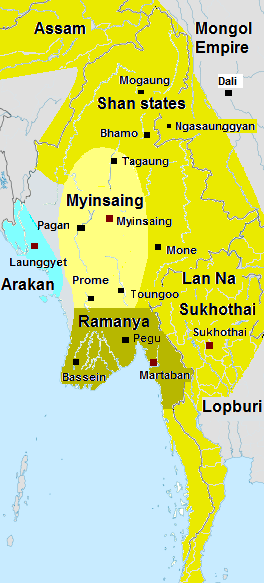
Rise of small kingdoms after the fall of Pagan Empire c. 1310. Tai-Shan Realm of Shan states, Lan Na, Sukhothai, and Ramanya in Lower Myanmar were Mongol vassals. Myinsaing was the only non-Mongol vassal state in the region.

The first signs of disorder appeared soon after Narathihapate's accession in 1256. The inexperienced king faced revolts in Arakanese state of Macchagiri (present-day Kyaukpyu District) (Note: (Harvey 1925: 326–327): The location of Macchagiri is likely to the west of Thayet on the western side of the Arakan Yoma; Harvey's map of Pagan Empire on p. 21 shows present-day Kyaukpru District (specifically, Ann) as Macchagiri.) in the west, and Martaban (Mottama) in the south. The Martaban rebellion was easily put down but Macchagiri required a second expedition before it too was put down. The calm did not last long. Martaban again revolted in 1285. This time, Pagan could not do anything to retake Martaban because it was facing an existential threat from the north. The Mongols of the Yuan dynasty demanded tribute in 1271 and again in 1273. When Narathihapate refused both times, the Mongols under Kublai Khan systematically invaded the country. The first invasion in 1277 defeated the Burmese at the Battle of Ngasaunggyan, and secured their hold of Kanngai (modern-day Yingjiang, Yunnan, 112 kilometres (70 mi) north of Bhamo). In 1283–85, their forces moved south and occupied the land down to Hanlin. Instead of defending the country, the king fled Pagan for Lower Myanmar, where he was assassinated by one of his sons in 1287.

The Mongols invaded again in 1287. Recent research indicates that Mongol armies may not have reached Pagan itself, and that even if they did, the damage they inflicted was probably minimal. But the damage was already done. All the vassal states of Pagan revolted right after the king's death, and went their own way. In the south, Wareru, the man who had seized the governorship of Martaban in 1285, consolidated Mon-speaking regions of Lower Myanmar, and declared Ramannadesa (Land of the Mon) independent on 30 January 1287. (Note: (Yazawin Thit Vol. 1 2012: 148, footnote 8): Thursday, Full moon of Tabodwe 648 ME = 30 January 1287) In the west too, Arakan stopped paying tribute. The chronicles report that the eastern territories including trans-Salween states of Keng Hung, Kengtung and Chiang Mai stopped paying tribute although most scholars attribute Pagan's limits to the Salween. At any rate, the 250-year-old Pagan Empire had ceased to exist.

==== Disintegration and fall ====
After their 1287 invasion, the Mongols continued to control down to Tagaung but refused to fill the power vacuum they had created farther south. Indeed, Emperor Kublai Khan never sanctioned an actual occupation of Pagan. His real aim appeared to have been "to keep the entire region of Southeast Asia broken and fragmented." At Pagan, one of Narathihapate's sons Kyawswa emerged as king of Pagan in May 1289. But the new "king" controlled just a small area around the capital, and had no real army. The real power in Upper Myanmar now rested with three brothers, who were former Pagan commanders, of nearby Myinsaing. When the Hanthawaddy kingdom of Lower Myanmar became a vassal of Sukhothai in 1293/94, it was the brothers, not Kyawswa, that sent a force to reclaim the former Pagan territory in 1295–96. Though the army was driven back, it left no doubt as to who held the real power in central Myanmar. In the following years, the brothers, especially the youngest, Thihathu, increasingly acted like sovereigns.

To check the increasing power of the three brothers, Kyawswa submitted to the Mongols in January 1297, and was recognised by the Mongol emperor Temür Khan as viceroy of Pagan on 20 March 1297. The brothers resented the new arrangement as a Mongol vassalage, as it directly reduced their power. On 17 December 1297, the three brothers overthrew Kyawswa and founded the Myinsaing Kingdom. The Mongols did not know about the dethronement until June–July 1298. In response, the Mongols launched another invasion, reaching Myinsaing on 25 January 1301, but could not break through. The besiegers took the bribes of the three brothers and withdrew on 6 April 1301. The Mongol government at Yunnan executed their commanders but sent no more invasions. They withdrew entirely from Upper Myanmar starting on 4 April 1303.

By then, the city of Pagan, once home to 200,000 people, had been reduced to a small town, never to regain its preeminence. (It survived into the 15th century as a settlement.) The brothers placed one of Kyawswa's sons as the governor of Pagan. Anawrahta's line continued to rule Pagan as governors under Myinsaing, Pinya and Ava Kingdoms until 1368/69. The male side of Pagan ended there although the female side passed into Pinya and Ava royalty. But the Pagan line continued to be claimed by successive Burmese dynasties down to the last Burmese dynasty Konbaung.

== Government ==
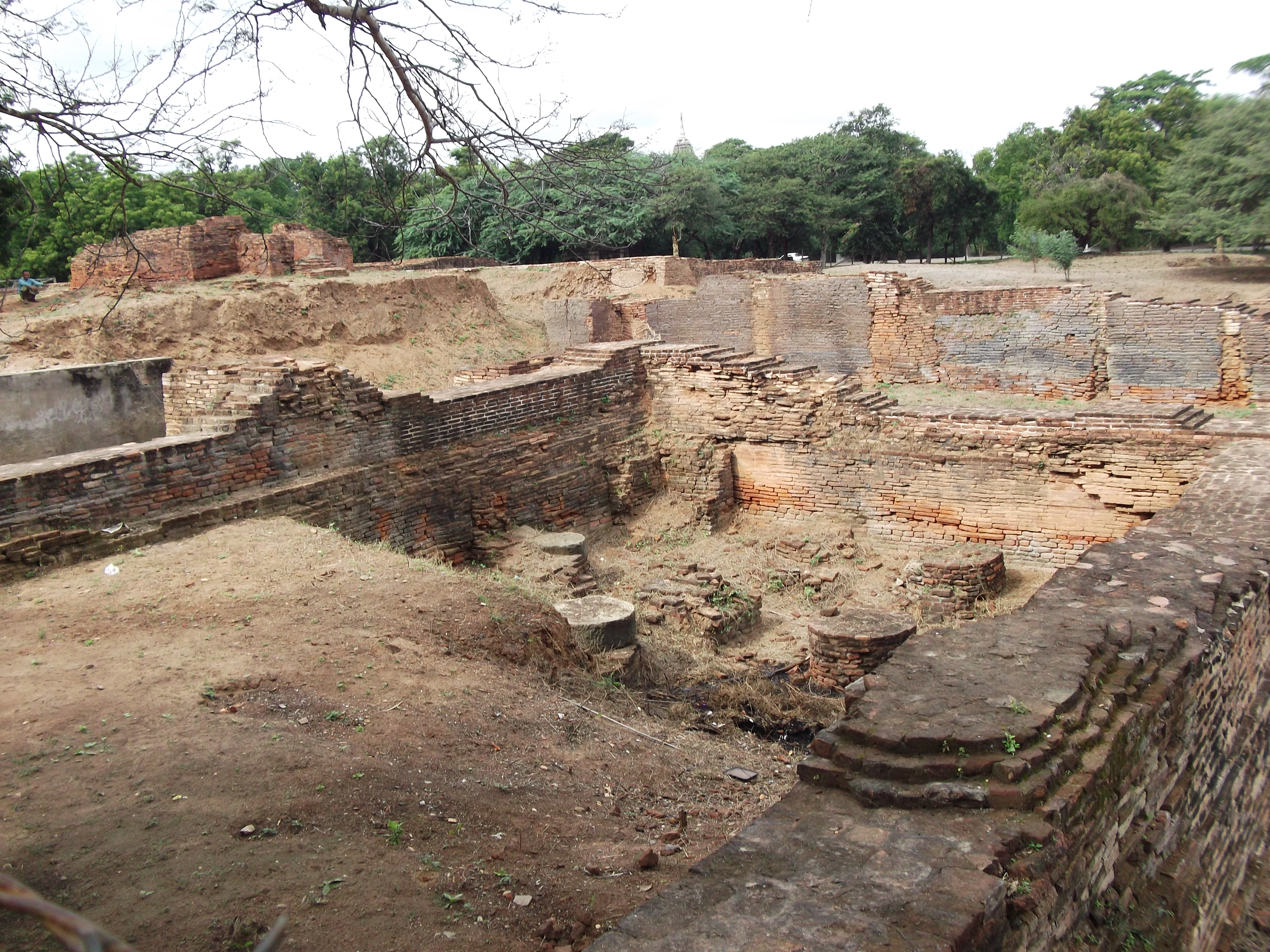
Ruins of the old Pagan palace

Pagan's government can be generally described by the mandala system in which the sovereign exercised direct political authority in the core region (pyi, lit. "country", ပြည်, [pjì]), and administered farther surrounding regions as tributary vassal states (naingngans, lit. "conquered lands", နိုင်ငံ, [nàiɴŋàɴ]). In general, the crown's authority diffused away with the increasing distance from the capital. Each state was administered at three general levels: taing (တိုင်း, province), myo (မြို့, town), and ywa (ရွာ, village), with the high king's court at the centre. The kingdom consisted of at least 14 taings.

=== Core region ===
The core region was the present-day Dry Zone of Upper Myanmar, measuring approximately 150 to 250 kilometres (93 to 155 mi) in radius from the capital. The region consisted of the capital and the key irrigated hubs (khayaings, ခရိုင်, [kʰəjàiɴ]) of Kyaukse and Minbu. Because of the irrigated hubs, the region supported the largest population in the kingdom, which translated into the largest concentration of royal servicemen who could be called into military service. The king directly ruled the capital and its immediate environs while he appointed most trusted members of the royal family to rule Kyaukse and Minbu. Newly settled dry zone taik (တိုက်, [taiʔ]) areas on the west bank of the Irrawaddy were entrusted to the men of lesser rank, as well as those from powerful local families known as taik leaders (taik-thugyis, တိုက်သူကြီး, [taiʔ ðədʑí]). The governors and taik-leaders lived off apanage grants and local taxes. But unlike their frontier counterparts, the core zone governors did not have much autonomy because of the close proximity to the capital.

=== Peripheral regions ===
Surrounding the core region were the naingngans or tributary states, governed by local hereditary rulers as well as Pagan appointed governors, drawn from princely or ministerial families. Because of their farther distances from the capital, the regions' rulers/governors had greater autonomy. They were required to send tributes to the crown but they generally had a free hand in the rest of the administration. They were chief justices, commanders-in-chief, and tax collectors. They made local officer appointments. In fact, no evidence of royal censuses or direct contact between the Pagan court and headmen beneath the governors has been found.

Over the course of 250 years, the throne slowly tried to integrate the most strategically and economically important regions—i.e. Lower Myanmar, Tenasserim, northernmost Irrawaddy valley—into the core by appointing its governors in place of hereditary rulers. In the 12th and 13th centuries, for example, Pagan made a point of appointing its governors in the Tenasserim coast to closely supervise the ports and revenues. By the second half of the 13th century, several key ports in Lower Myanmar (Prome, Bassein, Dala) were all ruled by senior princes of the royal family. However, the escape of Lower Myanmar from Upper Myanmar's orbit in the late 13th century proves that the region was far from fully integrated. History shows that the region would not be fully integrated into the core until the late 18th century.

The royal authority attenuated further in farther naingngans: Arakan, Chin Hills, Kachin Hills, and Shan Hills. These were tributary lands over which the crown only had a "largely ritual" or nominal sovereignty. In general, the king of Pagan received a periodic nominal tribute but had "no substantive authority", for example, on such matters as the selection of deputies, successors, or levels of taxation. Pagan largely stayed out of the affairs of these outlying states, only interfering when there were outright revolts, such as Arakan and Martaban in the late 1250s or northern Kachin Hills in 1277.

=== Court ===
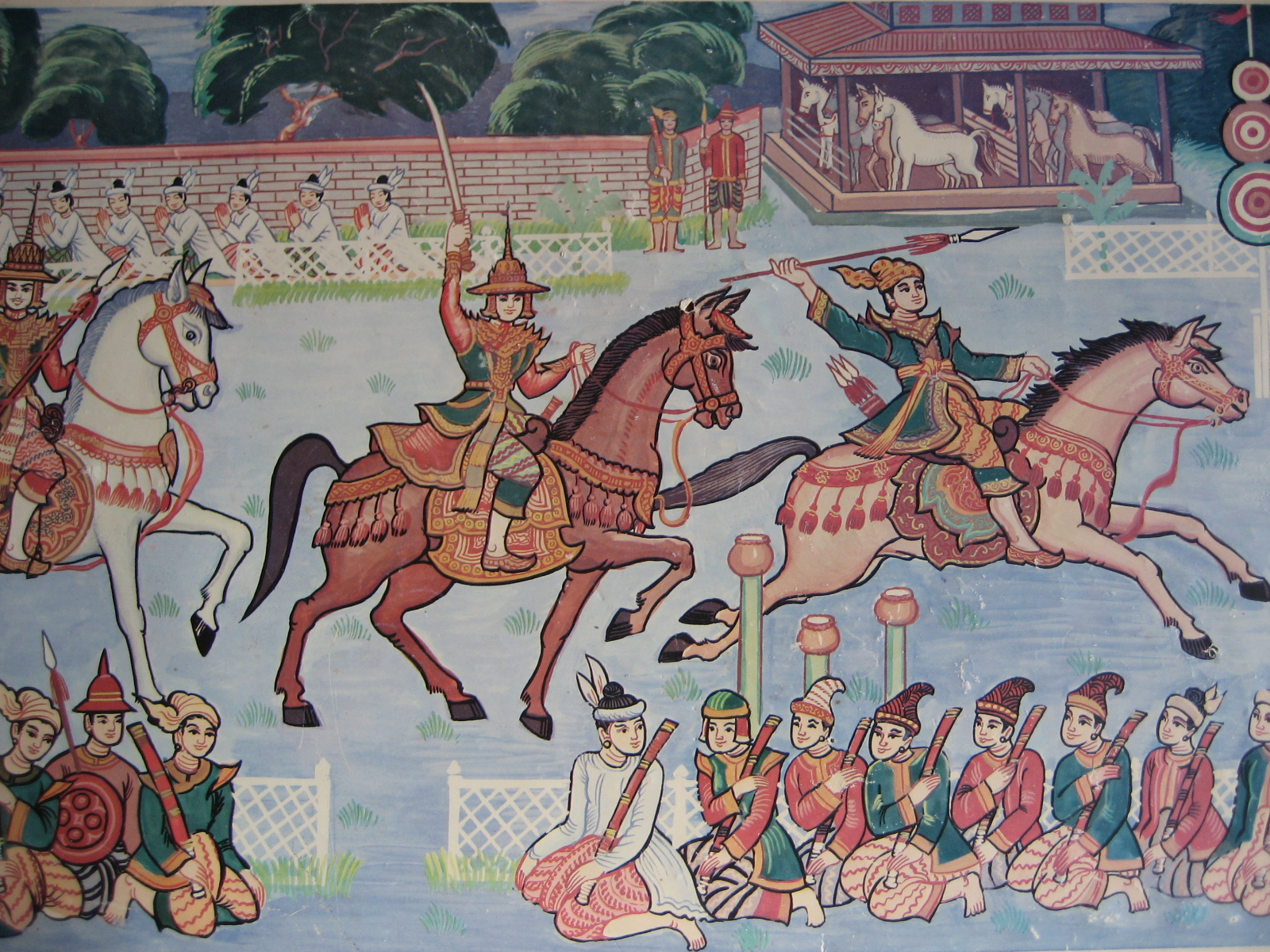
Burmese nobles partaking in equestrian sports

The court was the centre of administration, representing at once executive, legislative and judicial branches of the government. The members of the court can be divided into three general categories: royalty, ministers, and subordinate officials. At the top were the high king, princes, princesses, queens and concubines. The ministers were usually drawn from more distant branches of the royal family. Their subordinates were not royal but usually hailed from top official families. Titles, ranks, insignia, fiefs and other such rewards helped maintain the loyalty-patronage structure of the court.

The king, as the absolute monarch, was the chief executive, legislator and justice of the land. However, as the kingdom grew, the king gradually handed over responsibilities to the court, which became more extensive and complex, adding more administrative layers and officials. In the early 13th century, c. 1211, part of the court evolved into the king's privy council or Hluttaw. The role and power of the Hluttaw grew greatly in the following decades. It came to manage not only day-to-day affairs but also the military affairs of the kingdom. (No Pagan king after Sithu II ever took command of the army again.) The powerful ministers also became kingmakers. Their support was an important factor in the accession of the last kings of Pagan from Htilominlo (r. 1211–1235) to Kyawswa (r. 1289–1297).

The court was also the chief justice of the land. Sithu I (r. 1112–1167) was the first Pagan king to issue an official collection of judgments, later known as the Alaungsithu hpyat-hton, to be followed as precedents by all courts of justice. A follow-up collection of judgments was compiled during the reign of Sithu II (r. 1174–1211) by a Mon monk named Dhammavilasa. As another sign of delegation of power, Sithu II also appointed a chief justice and a chief minister.

=== Military ===
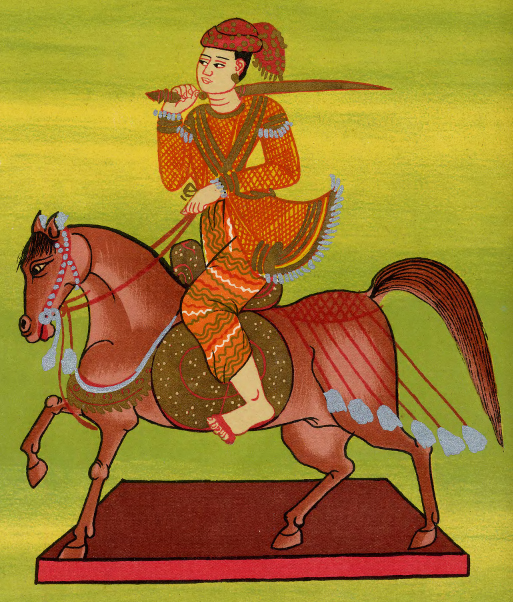
Pagan commander Aung Zwa in the service of Sithu II

Pagan's military was the origin of the Royal Burmese Army. The army was organised into a small standing army of a few thousand, which defended the capital and the palace, and a much larger conscript-based wartime army. Conscription was based on the kyundaw system (called the ahmudan system by later dynasties), which required local chiefs to supply their predetermined quota of men from their jurisdiction on the basis of population in times of war. This basic system of military organisation was largely unchanged down to the precolonial period, although later dynasties, especially the Toungoo dynasty, did introduce standardisation and other modifications.

The early Pagan army consisted mainly of conscripts raised just before or during the times of war. Although historians believe that earlier kings like Anawrahta must have had permanent troops on duty in the palace, the first specific mention of a standing military structure in the Burmese chronicles is 1174, when Sithu II founded the palace guards—"two companies inner and outer, and they kept watch in ranks one behind the other". The palace guards became the nucleus round which the mass levy assembled in war time. Most of the field levy served in the infantry but the men for the elephantry, cavalry, and naval corps were drawn from specific hereditary villages that specialised in respective military skills. In an era of limited military specialisation, when the number of conscripted cultivators offered the best single indication of military success, Upper Myanmar with a greater population was the natural centre of political gravity.

Various sources and estimates put Pagan's military strength anywhere between 30,000 and 60,000 men. One inscription by Sithu II, who expanded the empire to its greatest extent, describes him as the lord of 17,645 soldiers while another notes 30,000 soldiers and cavalry under his command. A Chinese account mentions a Burmese army of 40,000 to 60,000 (including 800 elephants and 10,000 horses) at the battle of Ngasaunggyan in 1277. However, some argue that the Chinese figures, which came from eye estimates of a single battle, are greatly exaggerated. As Harvey puts it: the Mongols "erred on the side of generosity as they did not wish to diminish the glory in defeating superior numbers". But assuming that the precolonial population of Myanmar was relatively constant, the estimates of 40,000 to 60,000 of the entire military are not improbable, and are in line with figures given for the Burmese military between the 16th and 19th centuries in a variety of sources.

== Economy ==
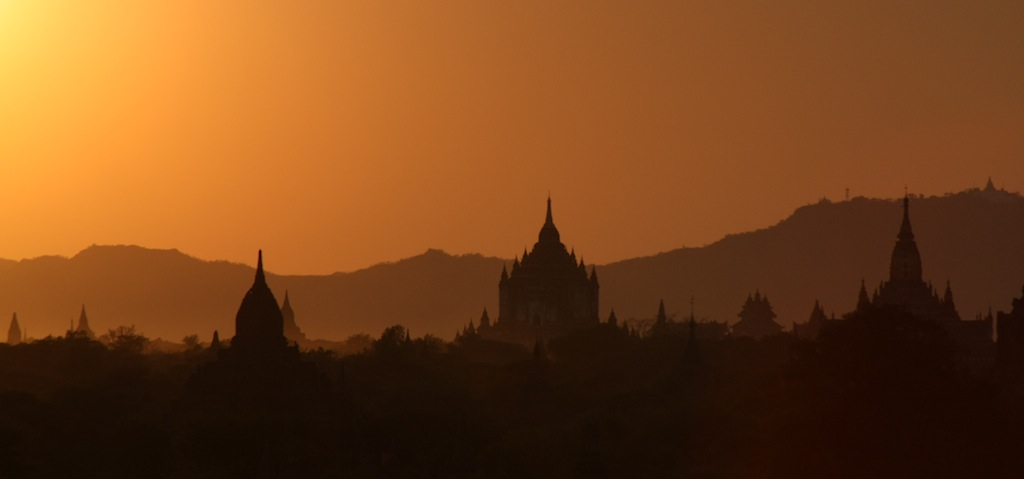
Pagan's prosperous economy built over 10,000 temples.

The economy of Pagan was based primarily on agriculture, and to a much smaller degree, on trade. The growth of the Pagan Empire and subsequent development of irrigated lands in new lands sustained a growth in the number of population centres and a growing prosperous economy. The economy also benefited from the general absence of warfare that would stunt the economies of later dynasties. According to Victor Lieberman, the prosperous economy supported "a rich Buddhist civilization whose most spectacular feature was a dense forest of pagodas, monasteries, and temples, totaling perhaps 10,000 brick structures, of which the remains of over 2000 survive."

=== Agriculture ===
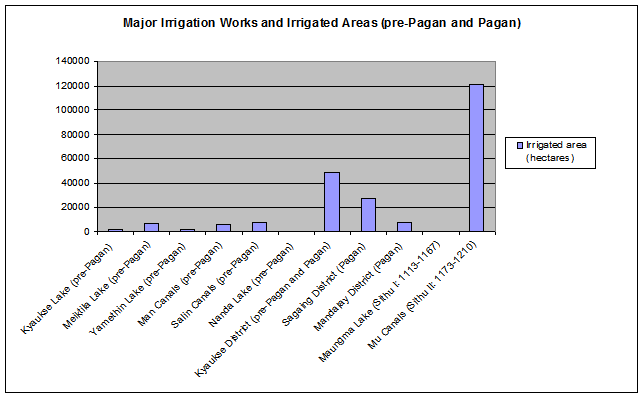
Development of irrigated lands

Agriculture was the primary engine of the kingdom from its beginnings in the 9th century. Burman immigrants are believed to have either introduced new water management techniques or greatly enhanced existing Pyu system of weirs, dams, sluices, and diversionary barricades. At any rate, the Kyaukse agricultural basin's development in the 10th and 11th centuries enabled the kingdom of Pagan to expand beyond the dry zone of Upper Myanmar, and to dominate its periphery, including the maritime Lower Myanmar.

As reconstructed by Michael Aung-Thwin, G.H. Luce and Than Tun, the main driver for this agriculture-based economic expansion was the practice of donating tax-free lands to the Buddhist clergy. For some two hundred years between 1050 and 1250, wealthy and powerful segments of the Pagan society—members of the royalty, senior court officials, and wealthy laymen—donated to the clergy enormous acreages of agricultural land, along with hereditary tied cultivators to attain religious merit. (Both religious lands and cultivators were permanently tax exempt.) Although it ultimately became a major burden on the economy, the practice initially helped expand the economy for some two centuries. First, the monastery-temple complexes, typically located some distances away from the capital, helped anchor new population centres for the throne. Such institutions in turn stimulated associated artisan, commercial, and agricultural activities critical to the general economy.

Secondly, the need to accumulate land for endowments, as well as for awards for soldiers and servicemen, drove the active development of new lands. The earliest irrigation projects focused on Kyaukse where Burmans built a large number of new weirs and diversionary canals, and Minbu a similarly well-watered district south of Pagan. After these hubs had been developed, in the mid-to-late 12th century, Pagan moved into as yet undeveloped frontier areas west of the Irrawaddy and south of Minbu. These new lands included both irrigable wet-rice areas and non-irrigable areas suitable for rain-fed rice, pulses, sesame, and millet. Agricultural expansion and temple construction in turn sustained a market in land and certain types of labour and materials. Land reclamation, religious donations, and building projects expanded slowly before 1050, increased to 1100, accelerated sharply with the opening of new lands between c. 1140 and c. 1210 and continued at a lower level from 1220 to 1300.

By the second half of the 13th century, Pagan had developed an enormous amount of cultivated lands. Estimates based on surviving inscriptions alone range from 200,000 to 250,000 hectares. (In comparison, Pagan's contemporary Angkor relied on its main rice basin of over 13,000 hectares.) But donations to the sangha over the 250 years of the empire accumulated to over 150,000 hectares (over 60%) of the total cultivated land. Ultimately, the practice proved unsustainable when the empire had stopped growing physically, and a major factor in the empire's downfall.

=== Trade ===
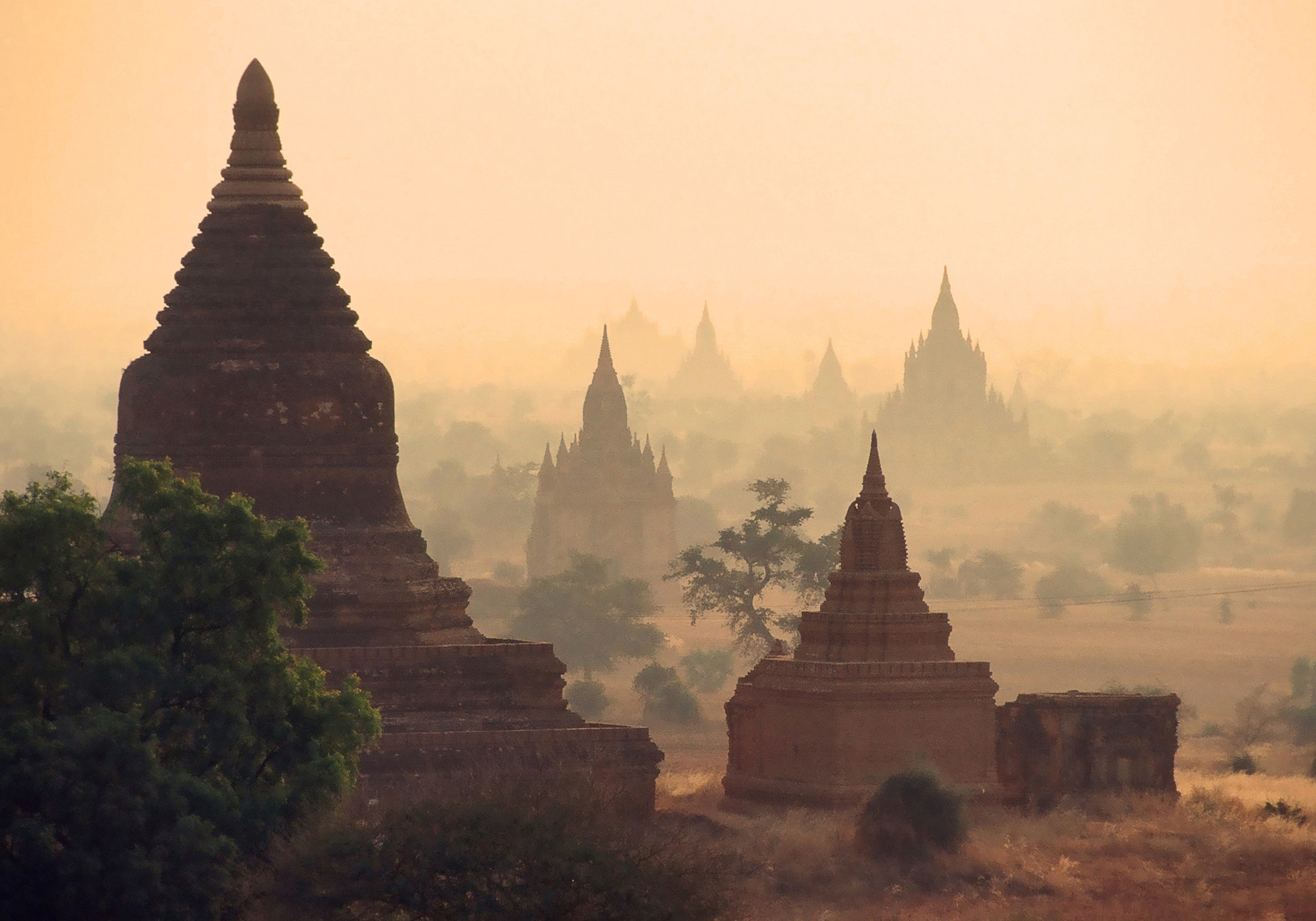
Ruins of Pagan

Internal and external trade played an important but minor role in Pagan's economy. Trade was not the main engine of economic growth for much of the Pagan period although its share of the economy probably increased in the 13th century when the agricultural sector stopped growing. That is not to say that Pagan did not have any interest in trade. On the contrary, Pagan closely administered its peninsular ports, which were transit points between the Indian Ocean and China. Maritime trade provided the court with revenues and prestige goods (coral, pearls, textiles). Evidence shows that Pagan imported silver from Yunnan, and that traded upland forest products, gems and perhaps metals with the coast. Still, no archaeological, textual or inscriptional evidence to indicate that such exports supported large numbers of producers or middlemen in Upper Myanmar itself, or that trade constituted a large part of the economy.

=== Currency ===
For all the innovations that the Pagan dynasty introduced, one area that it regressed was the use of coinage. The Pyu practice of issuing gold and silver coinage was not retained. The common medium of exchange was lump silver "coinage", followed by gold and copper lump coinage. Silver came from domestic mines as well as Yunnan. The base unit of currency of the silver kyat (unit) (ကျပ်), which was not a unit of value but rather a unit of weight at approximately 16.3293 grams. Other weight-based units in relation to the kyat were also in use.

Unit	in kyats
1 mat (မတ်)	0.25
1 bo (ဗိုဟ်)	5
1 viss (ပိဿာ)	100

A kyat, unless specified, always meant a silver kyat. Other metals were also in use. The value of other metal currencies vis-a-vis the silver kyat are shown below.

Metal type	in silver kyats
1 kyat of gold	10
1 kyat of copper	2
1 kyat of mercury	1.50

The lack of standardised coinage certainly complicated commerce. For instance, many types of silver kyats with varying degrees of purity were in use. Records show that people also used a system of barter to conduct commerce.

=== Prices ===
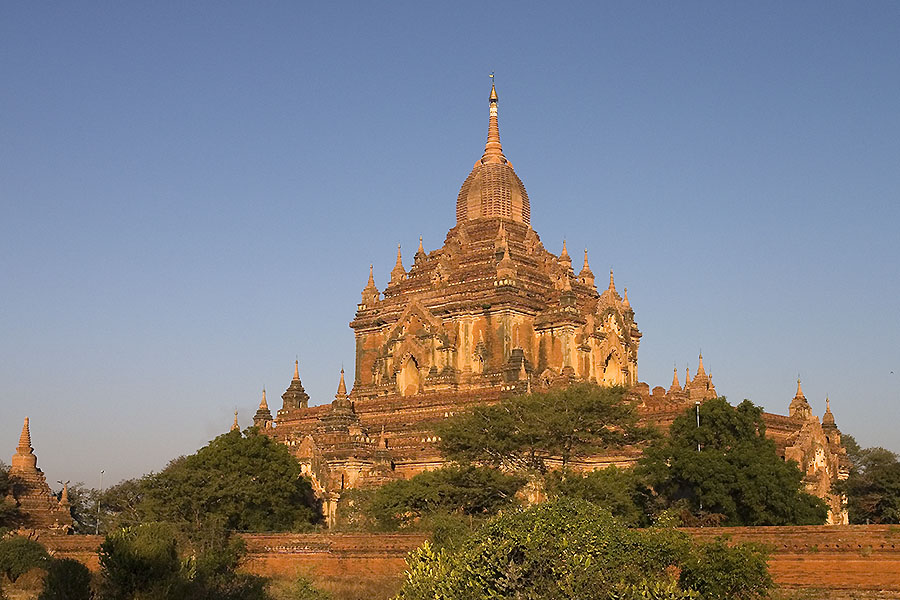
The Htilominlo Temple

Surviving records provide a glimpse of the kingdom's economic life. A pe (ပယ်, 0.71 hectare) of fertile land near Pagan cost 20 silver kyats but only 1 to 10 kyats away from the capital. Construction of a large temple in the reign of Sithu II cost 44,027 kyats while a large "Indian style" monastery cost 30,600 kyats. Manuscripts were rare and extremely costly. In 1273, a complete set of the Tripiṭaka cost 3000 kyats.

Good	in silver kyats
1 basket of paddy	0.5
1 viss of cow's milk	0.1
1 viss of honey	1.25
1000 betal nuts	0.75

== Culture and society ==
=== Demography ===
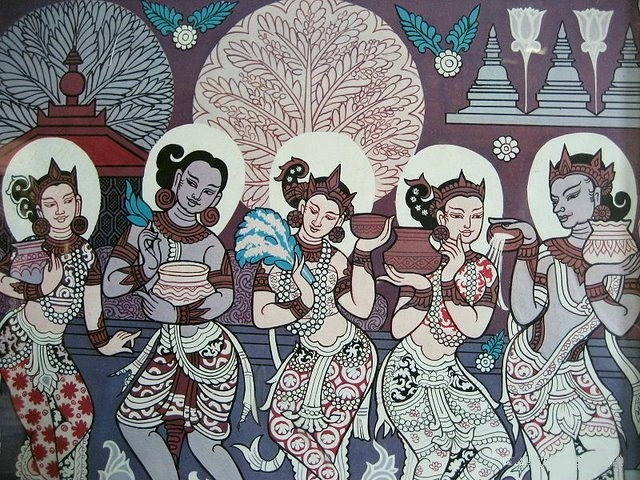
Thingyan New Year's festivities

==== Size of population ====
Various estimates put the population of Pagan Empire as anywhere between one and two and a half million but most estimates put it between one and a half and two million at its height. The number would be closer to the upper end, assuming that the population of pre-colonial Burma remained fairly constant. (The size of population in medieval times tended to stay flat over the course of many centuries. England's population between the 11th and 16th centuries remained at around 2.25 million, and China's population until the 17th century remained between 60 and 100 million for 13 centuries.) Pagan was the most populous city with an estimated population of 200,000 prior to the Mongol invasions.

==== Ethnic groups ====
The kingdom was an "ethnic mosaic". In the late 11th century, ethnic Burmans were still "a privileged but numerically limited population", heavily concentrated in the interior dry zone of Upper Burma. They co-existed with Pyus, who dominated the dry zone, until the latter came to identify themselves as Burmans by the early 13th century. Inscriptions also mention a variety of ethnic groups in and around Upper Burma: Mons, Thets, Kadus, Sgaws, Kanyans, Palaungs, Was and Shans. The peoples who lived in the highland perimeter were collectively classified as "hill peoples" (taungthus, တောင်သူ) although Shan migrants were changing the ethnic makeup of the hill region. In the south, Mons were dominant in Lower Burma by the 13th century, if not earlier. In the west, an Arakanese ruling class who spoke Burmese emerged.

To be sure, the notion of ethnicity in pre-colonial Burma was highly fluid, heavily influenced by language, culture, class, locale, and indeed political power. People changed their in-group identification, depending on the social context. The success and longevity of the Pagan Empire sustained the spread of Burman ethnicity and culture in Upper Burma in a process that came to be called Burmanization, which Lieberman describes as "assimilation by bi-lingual peoples, eager to identify with the imperial elite". According to Lieberman, Pagan's imperial power enabled the "construction of Burman cultural hegemony", evidenced by "the growth of Burmese writing, the concomitant decline in Pyu (and perhaps Mon) culture, new trends in art and architecture, and the expansion of Burmese-speaking cultivators into new lands".

Nonetheless, by the end of the Pagan period, the process of Burmanization, which would continue into the 19th century and eventually blanket the entire lowlands, was still in an early stage. The first extant Burmese language reference to "Burmans" appeared only in 1190, and the first reference to Upper Burma as "the land of the Burmans" (Myanma pyay) in 1235. The notion of ethnicity continued to be highly fluid and closely tied to political power. While the rise of Ava ensured the continued spread of Burman ethnicity in post-Pagan Upper Burma, the similar emergence of non-Burmese speaking kingdoms elsewhere helped develop ethnic consciousness closely tied to respective ruling classes in Lower Burma, Shan states and Arakan. For example, according to Lieberman and Aung-Thwin, "the very notion of Mons as a coherent ethnicity may have emerged only in the 14th and 15th centuries after the collapse of Upper Burman hegemony".

==== Social classes ====
Pagan's society was highly stratified among different social classes. At the top of the pyramid were the royalty (immediate royal family), followed by the upper officialdom (the extended royal family and the court), lower officialdom, artisans and crown service groups, and the commoners. The Buddhist clergy was not a class in the secular society but nonetheless represented an important social class.

The majority of the people belonged to one of four broad groups of commoners. First, royal servicemen were bondsmen (kyundaw, ကျွန်တော်) of the king, and were often assigned to individual headmen and officials who acted as the king's representatives. They received land grants from the crown, and were exempt from most personal taxes in exchange for regular or military service. Second, Athi (အသည်) commoners lived not on royal land but on communally-held land, and owed no regular royal service but paid substantial head taxes. Private bondsmen (kyun, ကျွန်) owed labour only to their individual patron, and lay outside the system of royal obligation. Finally, religious bondsmen (hpaya-kyun, ဘုရားကျွန်) were also private bondsmen who owed labour only to monasteries and temples but not to the crown.

Of the three bonded (non-athi) classes, royal bondsmen and religious bondsmen were hereditary while private bondsmen were not. A private bondsman's servitude to his patron stood until his debt was fully repaid. A bondman's obligations ceased with death, and could not be perpetuated down to his descendants. On the other hand, royal servicemen (kyundaw) were hereditary, and were exempt from personal taxes in exchange for royal service. Similarly, religious servicemen (hpaya-kyun) were hereditary, and were exempt from personal taxes and royal service in exchange for maintaining the affairs of monasteries and temples. Unlike royal servicemen or even athi commoners, the religious bondsmen could not be conscripted into military service.

=== Language and literature ===
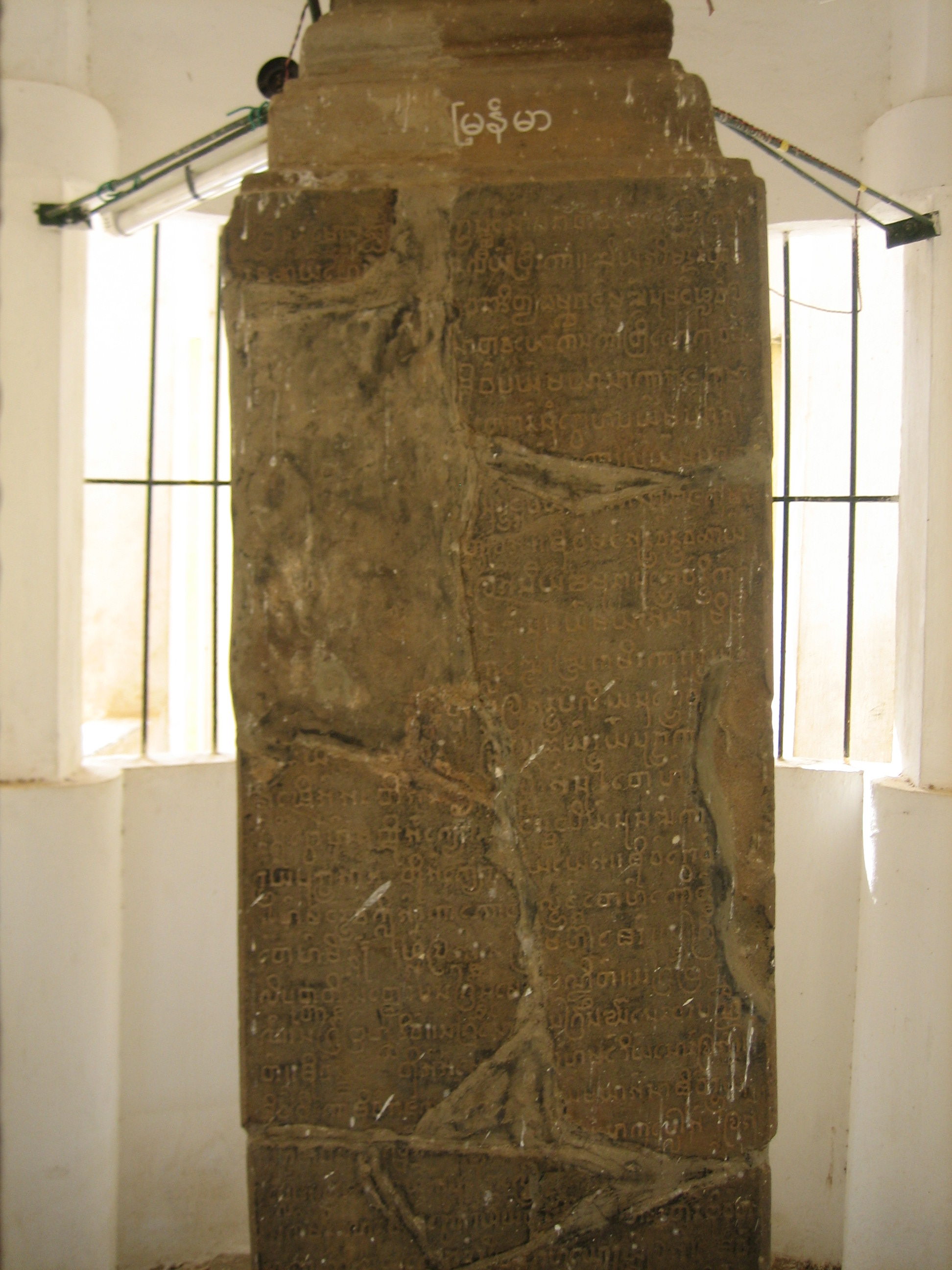
Myazedi inscription in the Burmese alphabet

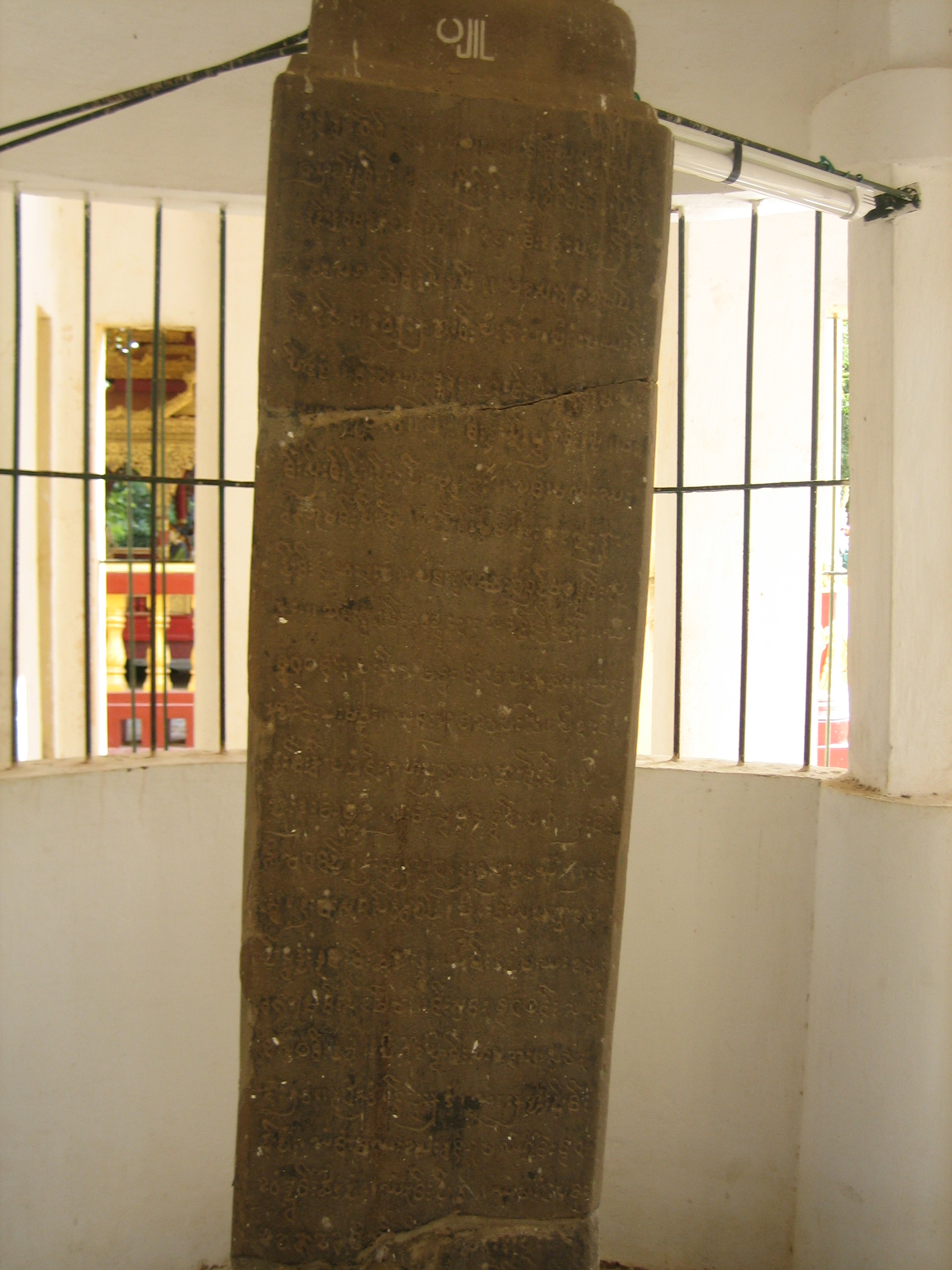
in Pyu

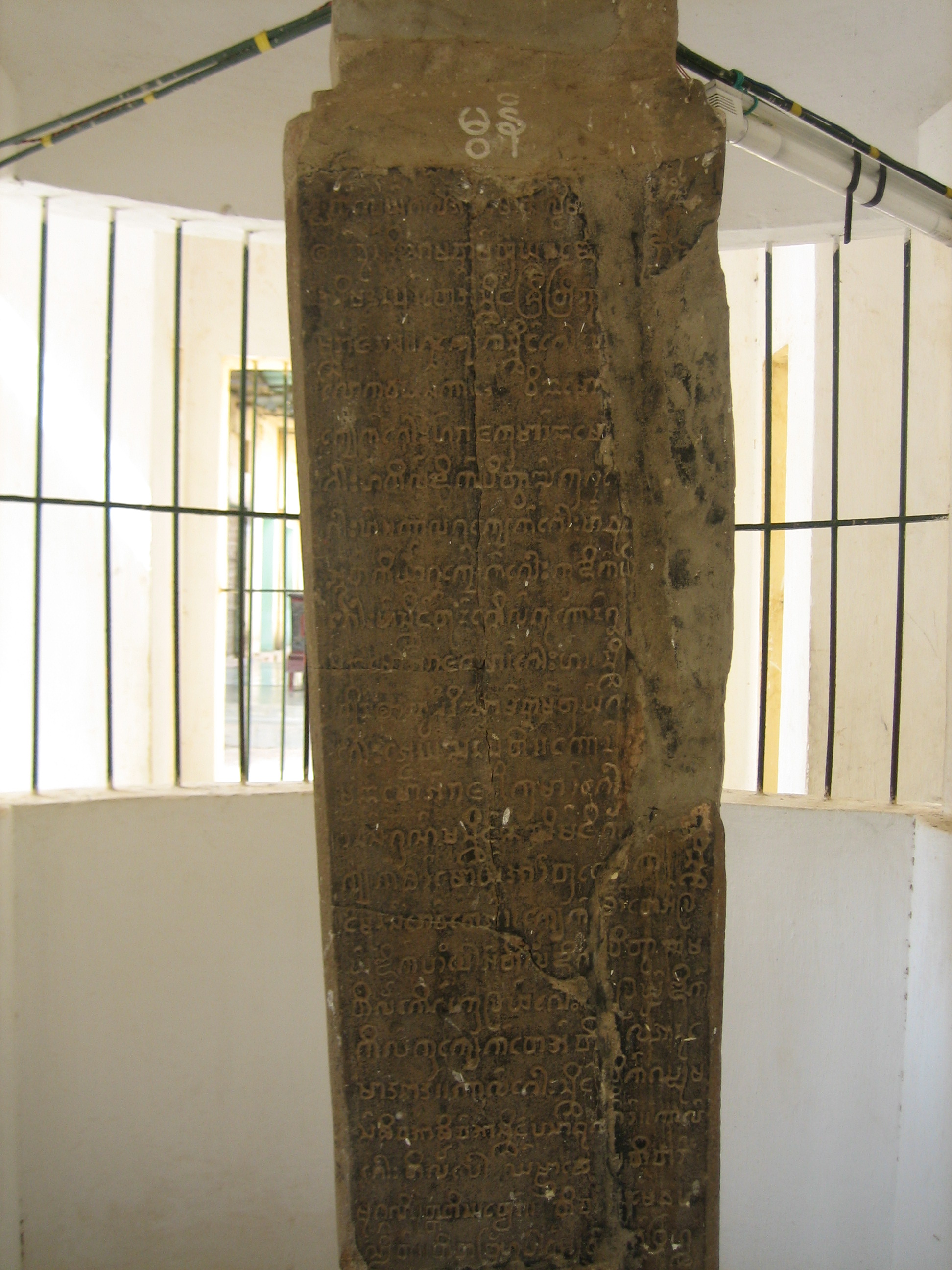
in Mon

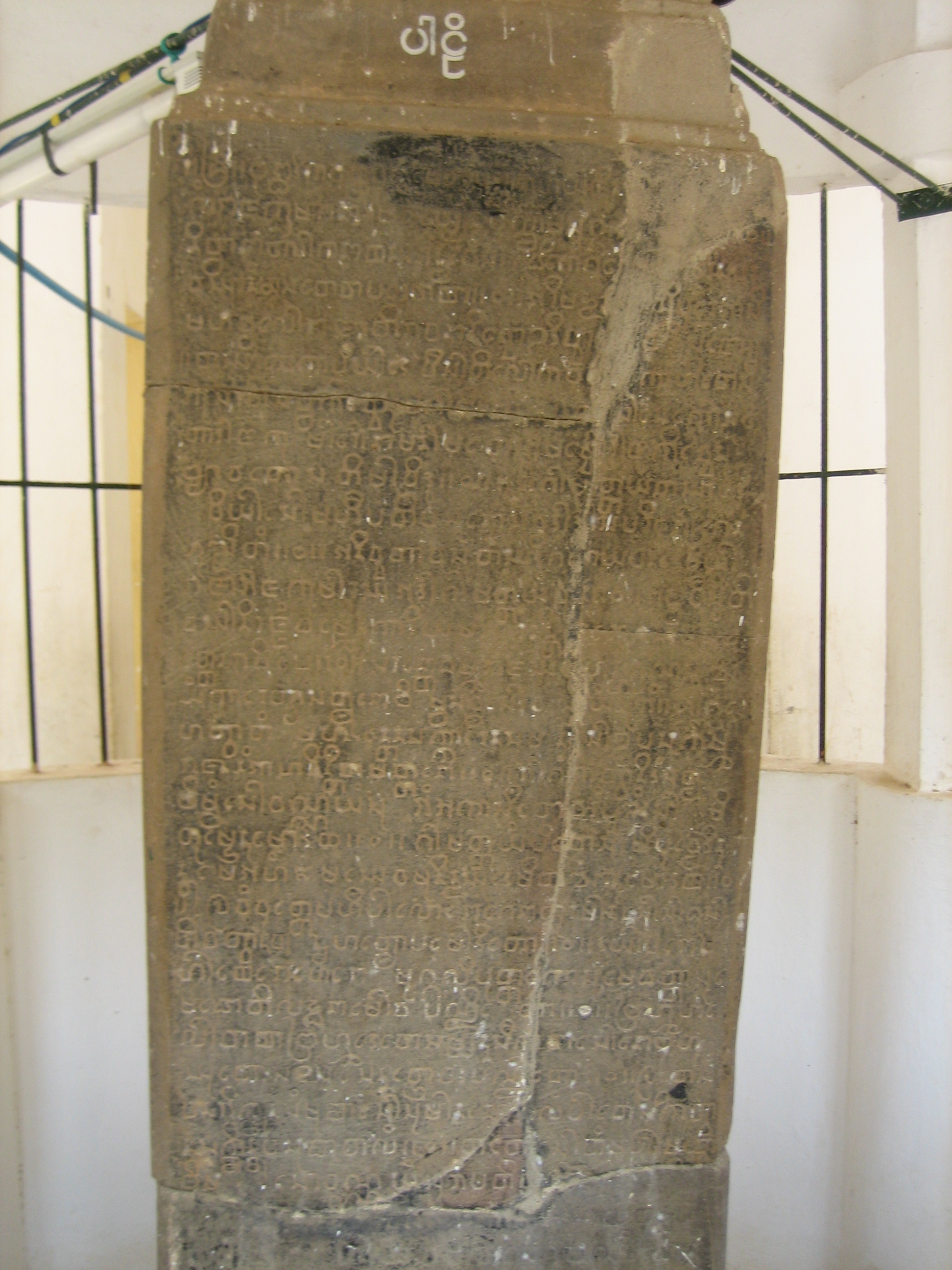
in Pali

==== Languages ====
The primary language of the ruling class of Pagan was Burmese, a Tibeto-Burman language related to both the Pyu language and the language of the ruling class of Nanzhao. But the spread of the language to the masses lagged behind the founding of the Pagan Empire by 75 to 150 years. In the early Pagan era, both Pyu and Mon were lingua francas of the Irrawaddy valley. Pyu was the dominant language of Upper Myanmar while Mon was sufficiently prestigious for Pagan rulers to employ the language frequently for inscriptions and perhaps court usages. Inscriptional evidence indicates that Burmese became the lingua franca of the kingdom only in the early 12th century, and perhaps the late 12th century when the use of Pyu and Mon in official usage declined. Mon continued to flourish in Lower Myanmar but Pyu as a language had died out by the early 13th century.

Another important development in Burmese history and Burmese language was the rise of Pali, the liturgical language of Theravada Buddhism. The use of Sanskrit, which had been prevalent in the Pyu realm and in the early Pagan era, declined after Anawrahta's conversion to Theravada Buddhism.

==== Scripts ====
Modern Burmese alphabet. The old Burmese style of writing did not have cursive features, which are hallmarks of the modern script.

The spread of Burmese language was accompanied by that of the Burmese alphabet. Mainstream scholarship holds that the Burmese alphabet was developed from the Mon script in 1058, a year after Anawrahta's conquest of the Thaton Kingdom. Burmese script may have instead been derived from the Pyu script in the 10th century based on whether the Mon script found in Myanmar was sufficiently different from the older Mon script found in the Mon homelands of Dvaravati and on whether a recast 18th century copy of an original stone inscription is permissible as evidence.

==== Literature ====
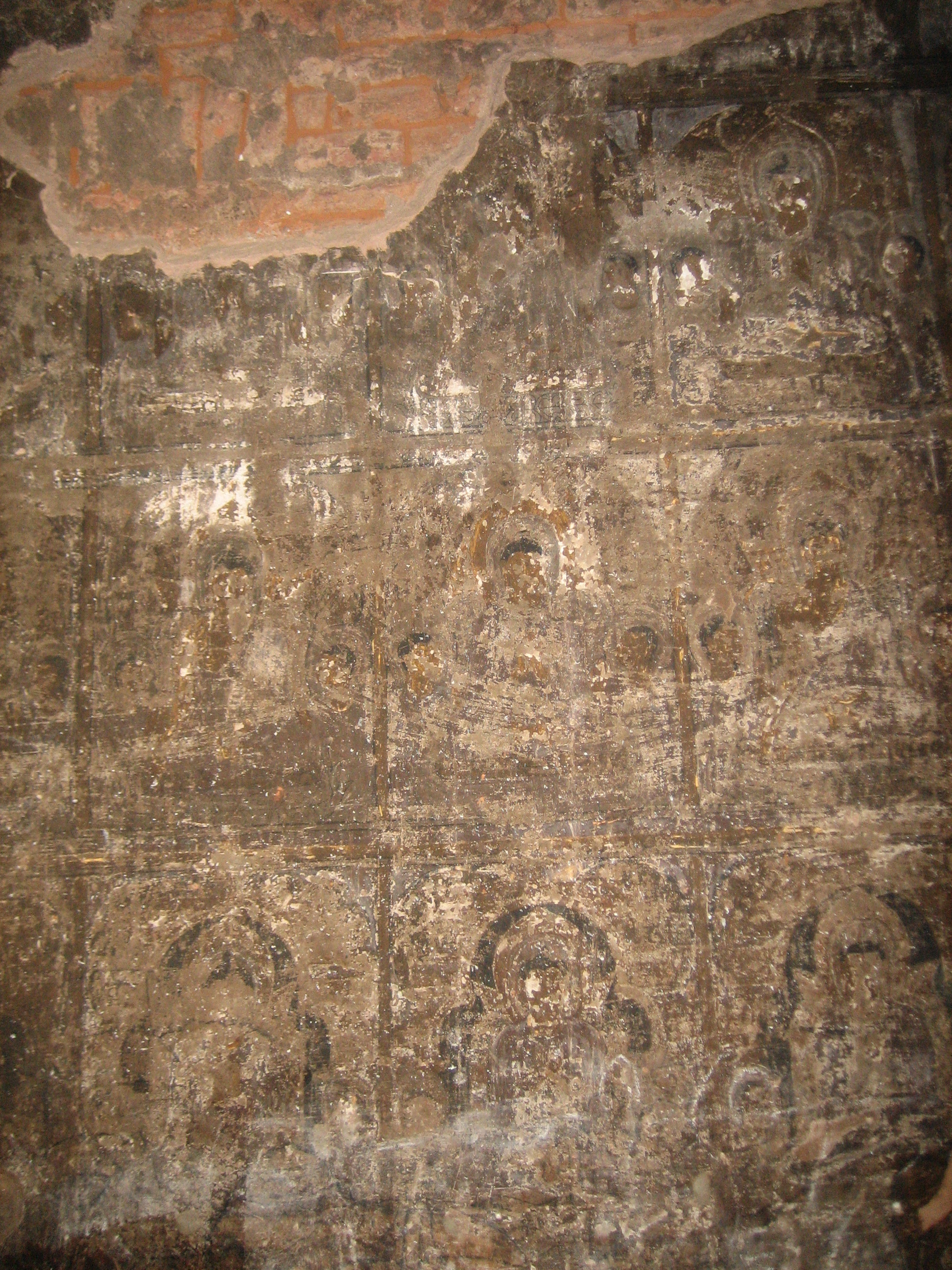
Frescoes of Buddhist Jataka stories at a Pagan temple

Whatever the origin of the Burmese alphabet may be, writing in Burmese was still a novelty in the 11th century. A written Burmese language became dominant in court only in the 12th century. For much of the Pagan period, written materials needed to produce large numbers of literate monks and students in the villages simply did not exist. According to Than Tun, even in the 13th century, "the art of writing was then still in its infancy with the Burmans". Manuscripts were rare and extremely costly. As late as 1273, a complete set of the Tripiṭaka cost 3000 kyats of silver, which could buy over 2000 hectares of paddy fields. Literacy in Burmese, not to mention Pali, was the effective monopoly of the aristocracy and their monastic peers.

At Pagan and at main provincial centres, Buddhist temples supported an increasingly sophisticated Pali scholarship, which specialised in grammar and philosophical-psychological (abhidhamma) studies, and which reportedly won the admiration of Sinhalese experts. Besides religious texts, Pagan's monks read works in a variety of languages on prosody, phonology, grammar, astrology, alchemy, and medicine, and developed an independent school of legal studies. Most students, and probably the leading monks and nuns, came from aristocratic families. At any rate, local illiteracy probably prevented the sort of detailed village censuses and legal rulings that became a hallmark of post-1550 Toungoo administration.

=== Religion ===
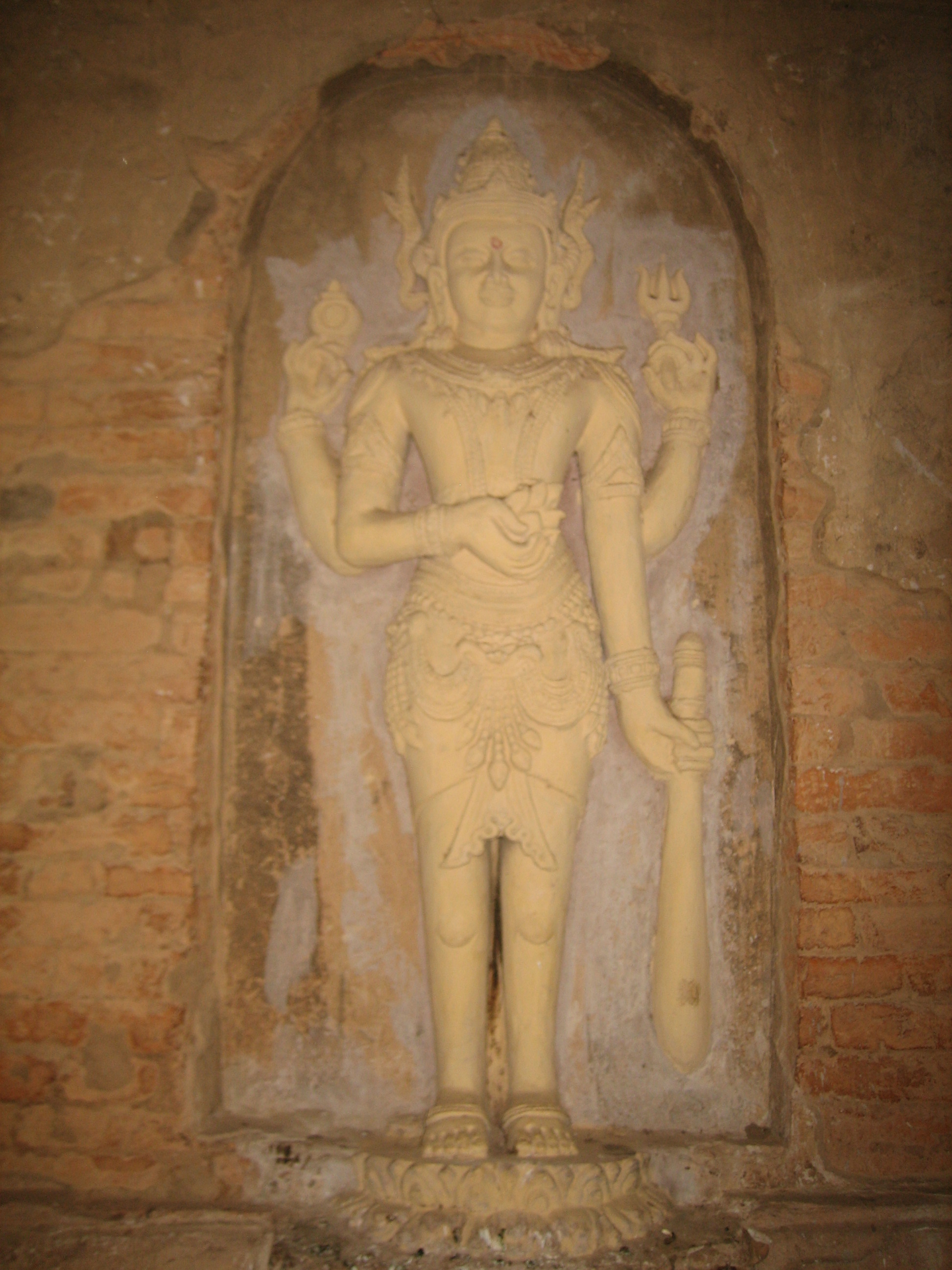
Statute of Vishnu at the Nat-Hlaung Kyaung Temple

The religion of Pagan was fluid, syncretic and by later standards, unorthodox—largely a continuation of religious trends in the Pyu era where Theravada Buddhism co-existed with Mahayana Buddhism, Tantric Buddhism, various Hindu (Saivite, and Vaishnava) schools as well as native animist (nat) traditions. While the royal patronage of Theravada Buddhism since the mid-11th century had enabled the Buddhist school to gradually gain primacy, and produce over 10,000 temples in Pagan alone in its honour, other traditions continued to thrive throughout the Pagan period to degrees later unseen. While several Mahayana, Tantric, Hindu and animist elements have remained in Burmese Buddhism to the present day, in the Pagan era, however, Tantric, Saivite, and Vaishnava elements had greater influence in the elite social strata than in later periods. According to historian Victorian Lieberman, this reflected "both the immaturity of Burmese literary culture and its indiscriminate receptivity to non-Burman traditions". In this period, "heretical" did not mean non-Buddhist, merely unfaithful to one's own scriptures, whether Brahmanic, Buddhist or whatever.

==== Theravada Buddhism ====
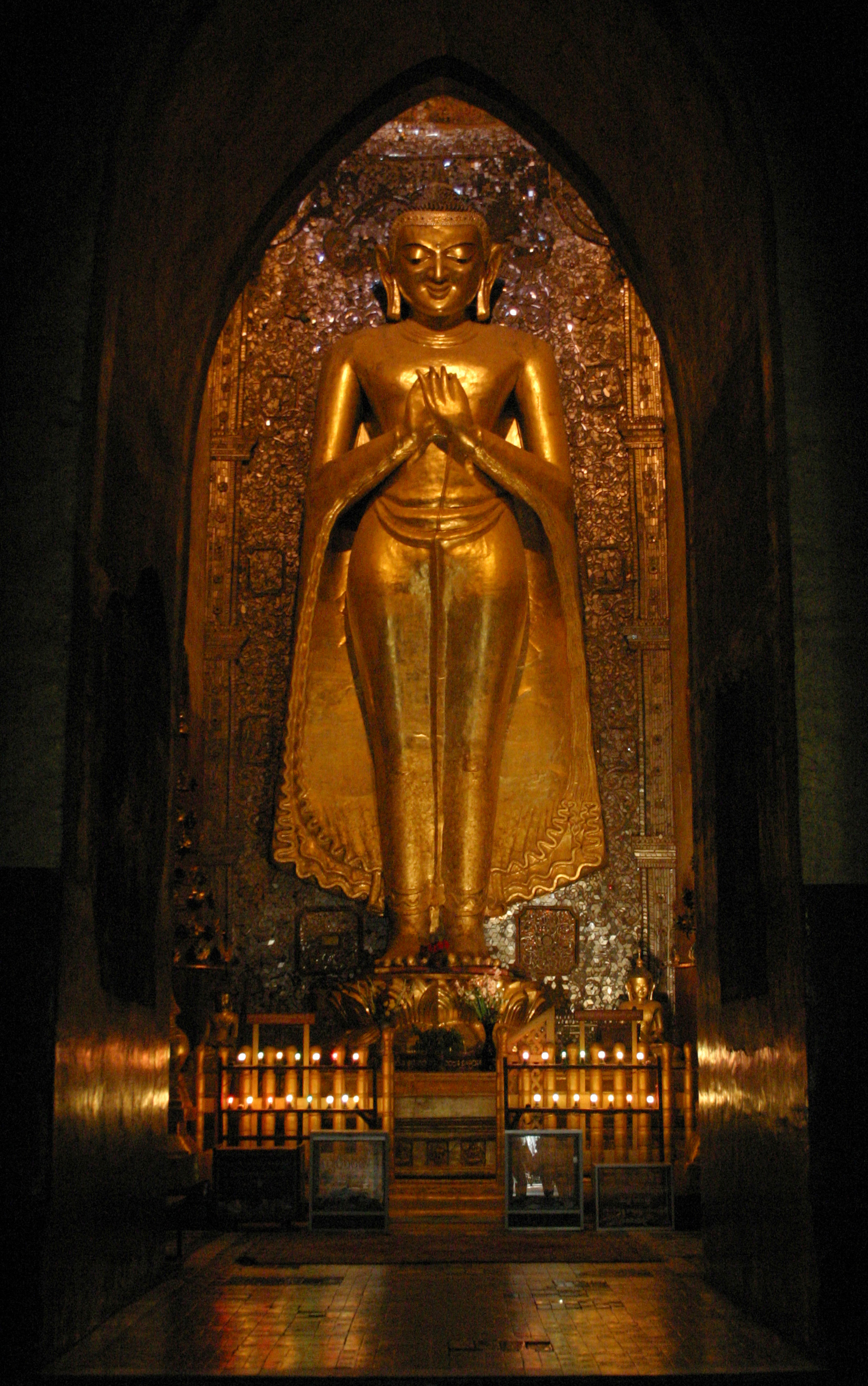
Ananda Temple's Kassapa Buddha – South facing

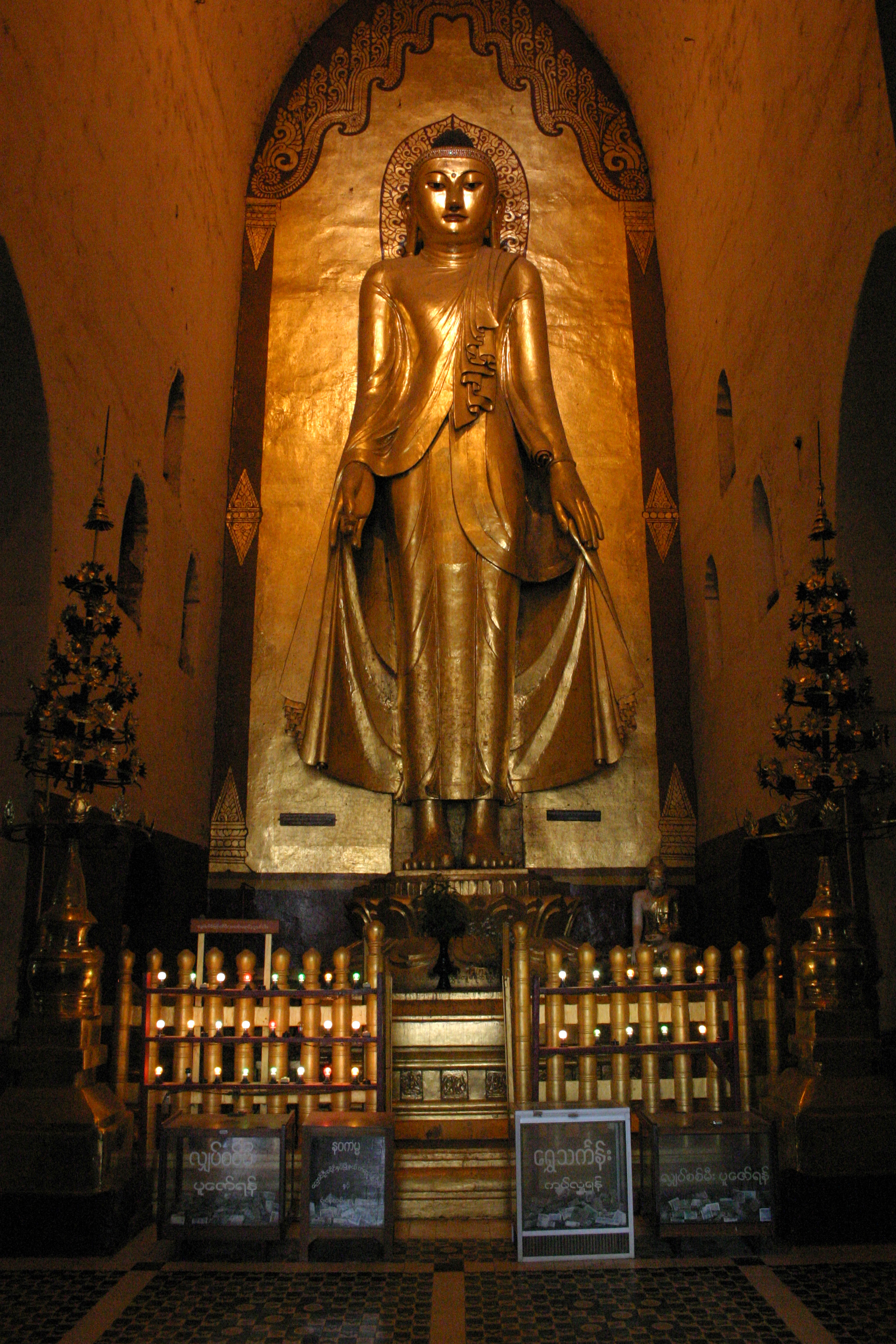
Kakusandha Buddha – North facing

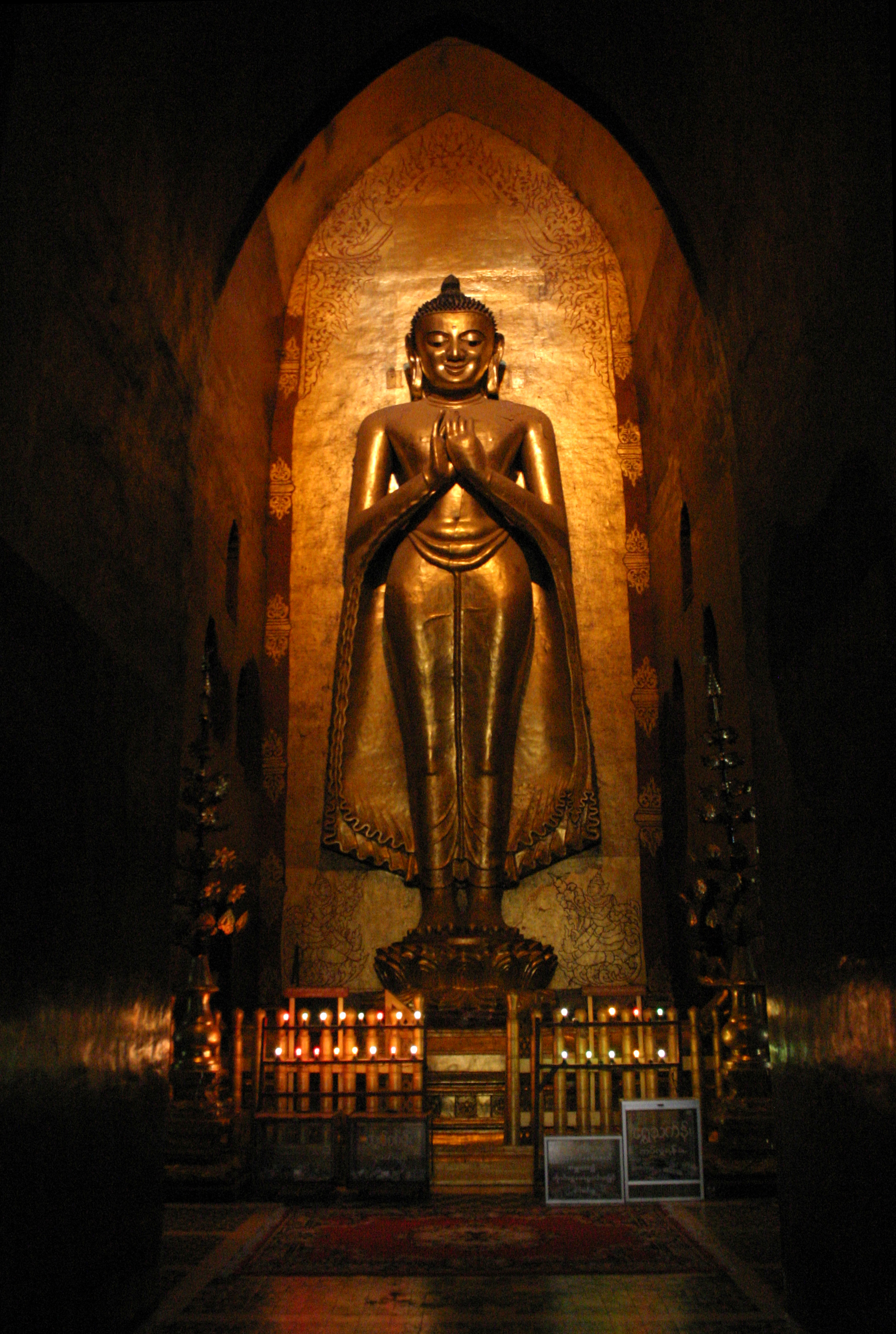
Koṇāgamana Buddha – East facing

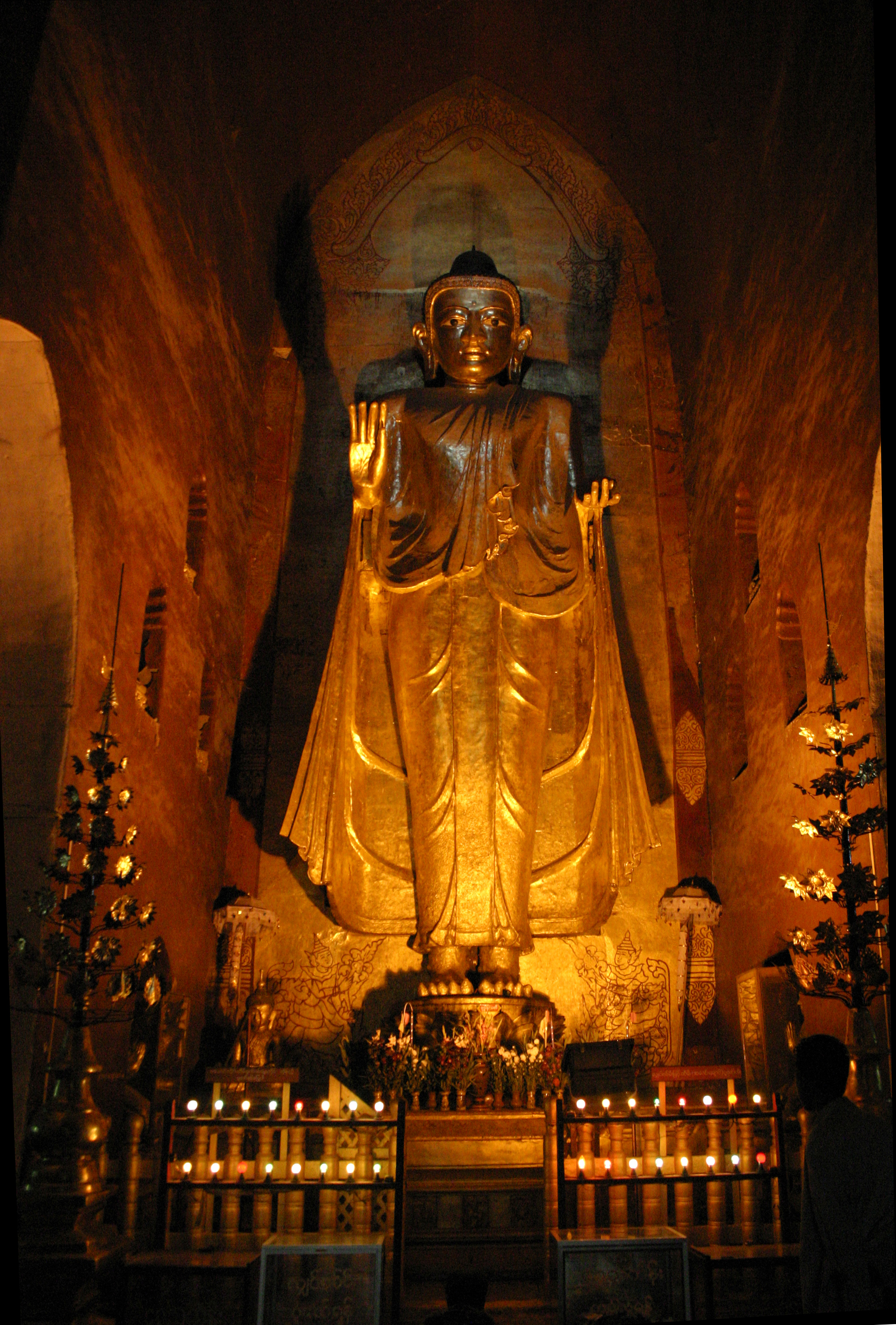
Gautama Buddha – West facing

One of the most enduring developments in Burmese history was the gradual emergence of Theravada Buddhism as the primary faith of the Pagan Empire. A key turning point came c. 1056 when the Buddhist school won the royal patronage of an ascendant empire with Anawrahta's conversion from his native Tantric Buddhism. According to mainstream scholarship, Anawrahta proceeded to revitalise Theravada Buddhism in Upper Myanmar with help from the conquered kingdom of Thaton in 1057 in Lower Myanmar. More recently, however, Aung-Thwin has argued forcefully that Anawrahta's conquest of Thaton is a post-Pagan legend without contemporary evidence, that Lower Myanmar in fact lacked a substantial independent polity prior to Pagan's expansion, and that the Mon influence on the interior is greatly exaggerated. Instead, he argues that it is more likely that Burmans borrowed Theravada Buddhism from their neighbour Pyus, or directly from India. The Theravada school prevalent in the early and mid Pagan periods, like in the Pyu realm, was probably derived from the Andhra region in southeast India, associated with the famous Theravada Buddhist scholar, Buddhaghosa. It was the predominant Theravada school in Myanmar until the late 12th century when Shin Uttarajiva led the realignment with Ceylon's Mahavihara school.

To be sure, the Theravada Buddhist scene of the Pagan era had little semblance to those of Toungoo and Konbaung periods. Much of the institutional mechanisms prevalent in later centuries simply did not yet exist. For instance, in the 19th century, a network of Theravada monasteries in every village used Burmese-language manuscripts to provide youths from diverse backgrounds with basic Buddhist literacy. This was a reciprocal exchange: monks relied on villagers for their daily food, while villagers depended on monks for schooling, sermons, and an opportunity to gain merit by giving alms and inducting their young men into the community of monks, the sangha. Such arrangements produced a male literacy rates of over 50 percent, and remarkable levels of textual Buddhist knowledge on the village level. But in the Pagan era, key 19th century elements were not yet in place. No village-level network of monasteries or meaningful interdependence between the monks and villagers existed. The monks relied on the royal donations, and those from major sects, which had vast landed holdings, did not have to rely on daily alms, inhibiting close interaction with villagers. The low levels of interaction in turn retarded literacy in Burmese, and limited most commoners' understanding of Buddhism to non-textual means: paintings at the great temples, pageants, folkloric versions of the Jataka stories of the Buddha's life, etc. Most commoners retained the worship of nat spirits and other beliefs.

==== Other traditions ====
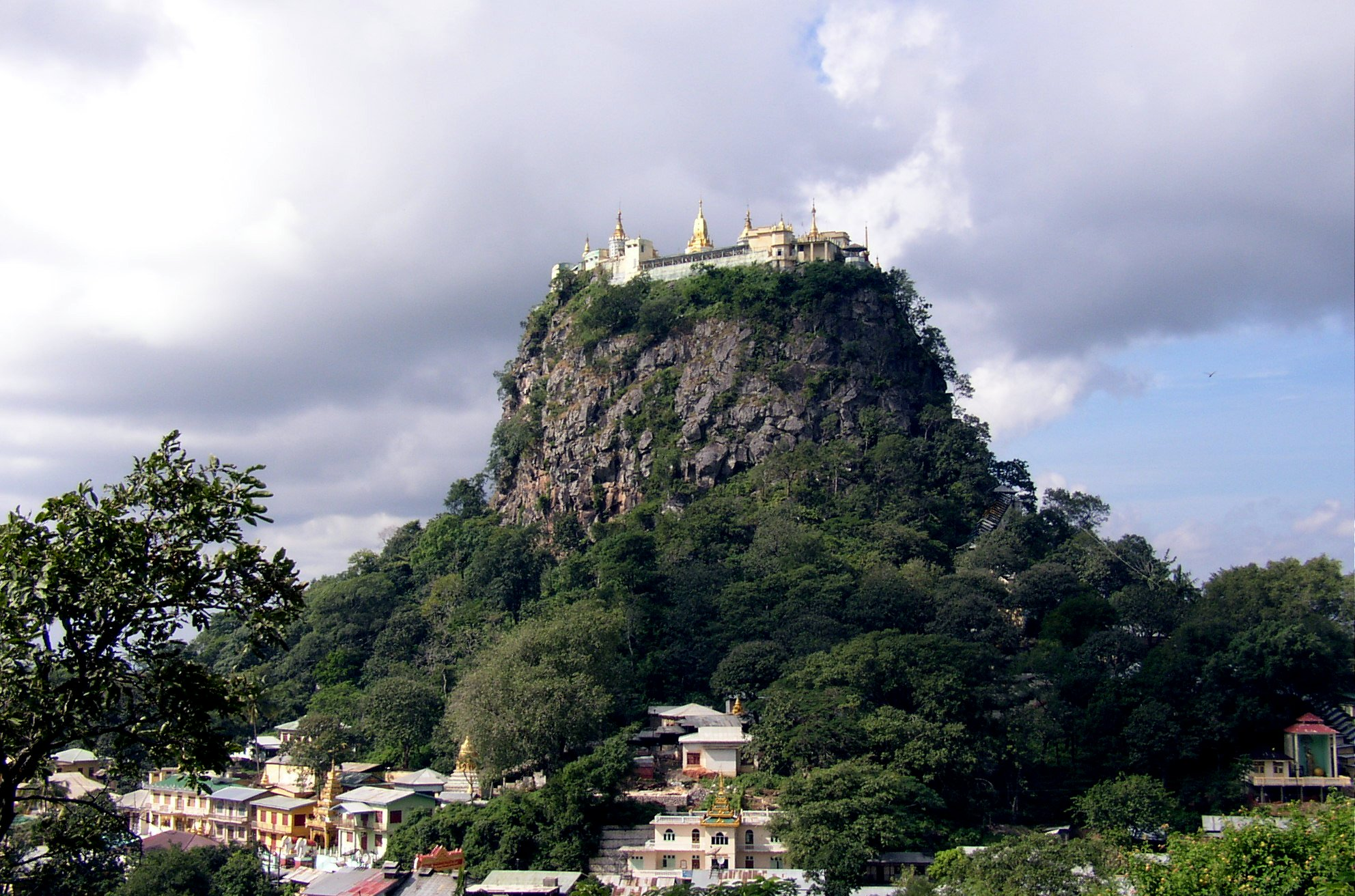
Mt. Popa, home of the pantheon of nats

Other traditions also continued to thrive not only at the village level but also at the nominally Theravadin court. One powerful group was the Forest Dweller or Ari monks, who enjoyed wide influence at the Pagan court. Contemporary inscriptions show that the Aris ate evening meals, and presided over public ceremonies where they drank liquor and where cattle and other animals were sacrificed—activities considered scandalous by Burmese Buddhist norms of the 18th and 19th centuries. Aris reportedly also enjoyed a form of ius primae noctis, at least prior to Anawrahta. (Though Anawrahta is said to have driven out the Aris from his court, they were certainly back at the court by the late Pagan period, and continued to be a presence at the later Burmese courts down to the Ava period.) Ari Buddhism itself was a mix of Tantric Buddhism and local traditions. For example, ceremonial animal slaughter and alcohol consumption long antedated the Burmans' arrival, and continued in remote parts of mainland and maritime Southeast Asia until recent times.

The state also accommodated the powerful animist traditions, as shown in the official spirit (nat) propitiation ceremonies, and in the court's sponsorship of an elaborate nat pantheon that sought to assimilate local deities and persons of prowess to a more unified cultus. The Burmans may have derived the concept of an official pantheon from Mon tradition. Likewise, the early Pagan court worshiped snakes (nagas) venerated in pre-Buddhist times. To judge by 14th-century patterns, sacrifices to nat spirits mediated by shamans, were still a central village ritual. As elsewhere in Southeast Asia, homosexuals or transvestites (who already inhabited two "incompatible" realms) as well as women with appropriate powers provided a shamanic bridge from the human world to that of the spirits.

=== Architecture ===
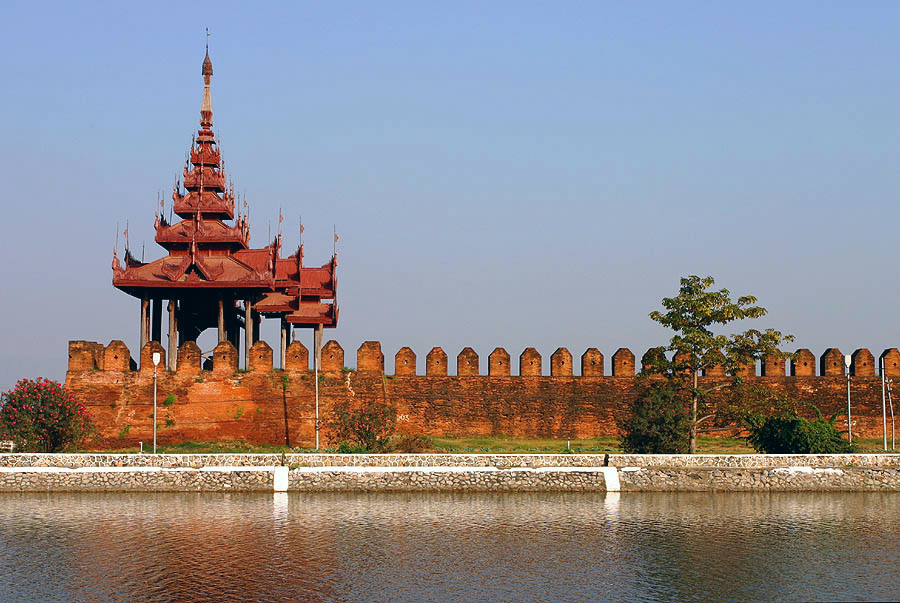
Design of 19th century Mandalay Palace followed its Pagan era predecessors

Bagan is well known today for its architecture, and over 2000 remaining temples that dot the modern-day Pagan (Bagan) plains today. Other, non-religious aspects of Pagan architecture were equally important to later Burmese states.

==== Irrigation and city planning ====
Burman immigrants are believed to have either introduced new water management techniques or greatly enhanced existing Pyu system of weirs, dams, sluices, and diversionary barricades. The techniques of building dams, canals and weirs found in pre-colonial Upper Myanmar trace their origins to the Pyu era and the Pagan era. Pagan's several water management projects in the dry zone provided Upper Myanmar with an enduring economic base to dominate the rest of the country.

In the areas of city planning and temple design, Pagan architecture borrowed heavily from existing Pyu architectural practices, which in turn were based on various Indian styles. Pagan-era city planning largely followed Pyu patterns, the most notable being the use of 12 gates, for each of the signs of the zodiac.

==== Stupas ====
Pagan stands out not only for the sheer number of religious edifices but also for the magnificent architecture of the buildings, and their contribution to Burmese temple design. Pagan temples fall into one of two broad categories: the stupa-style solid temple and the gu-style (ဂူ) hollow temple.

Evolution of the Burmese stupa

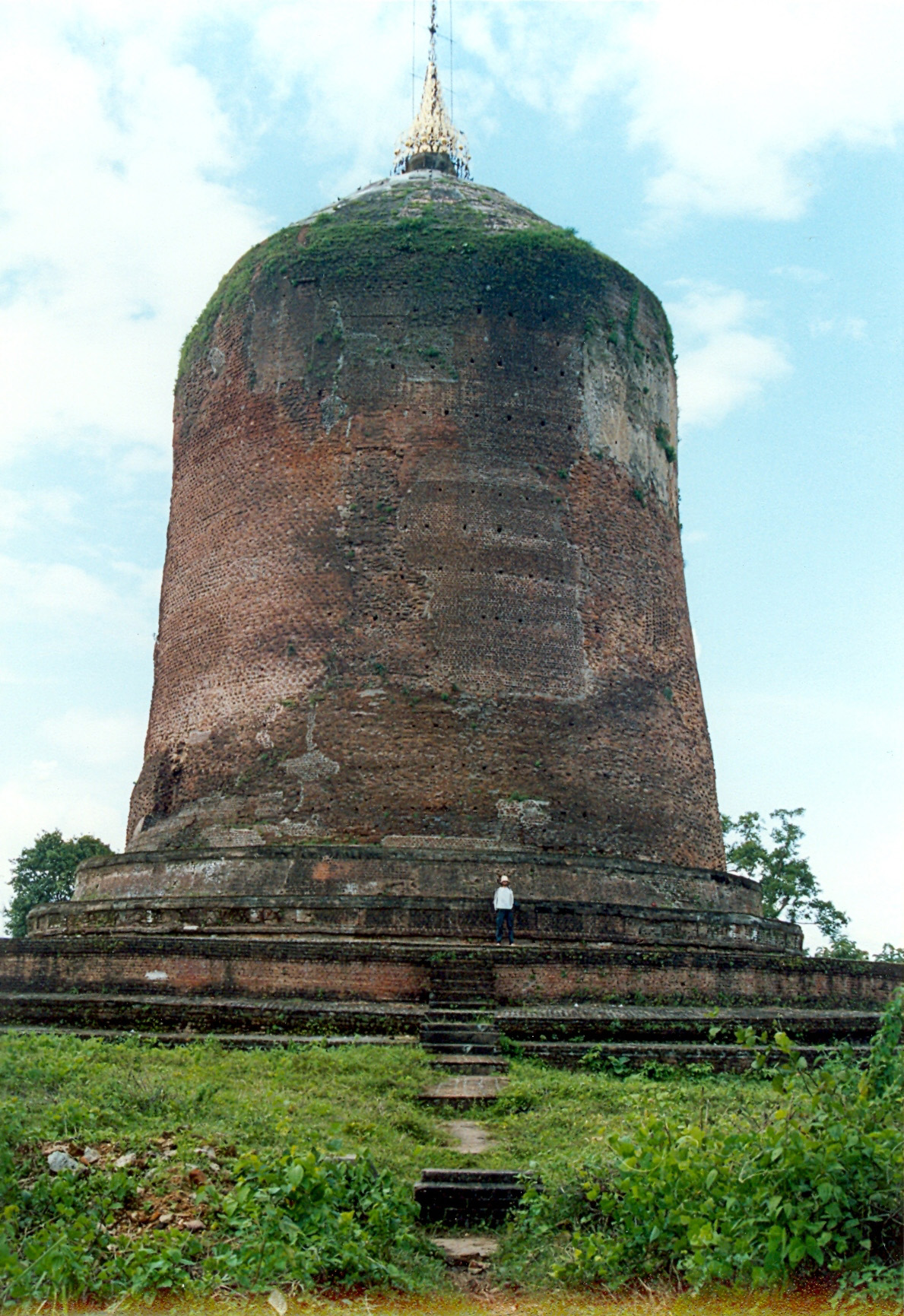
Bawbawgyi Pagoda (7th century Sri Ksetra)

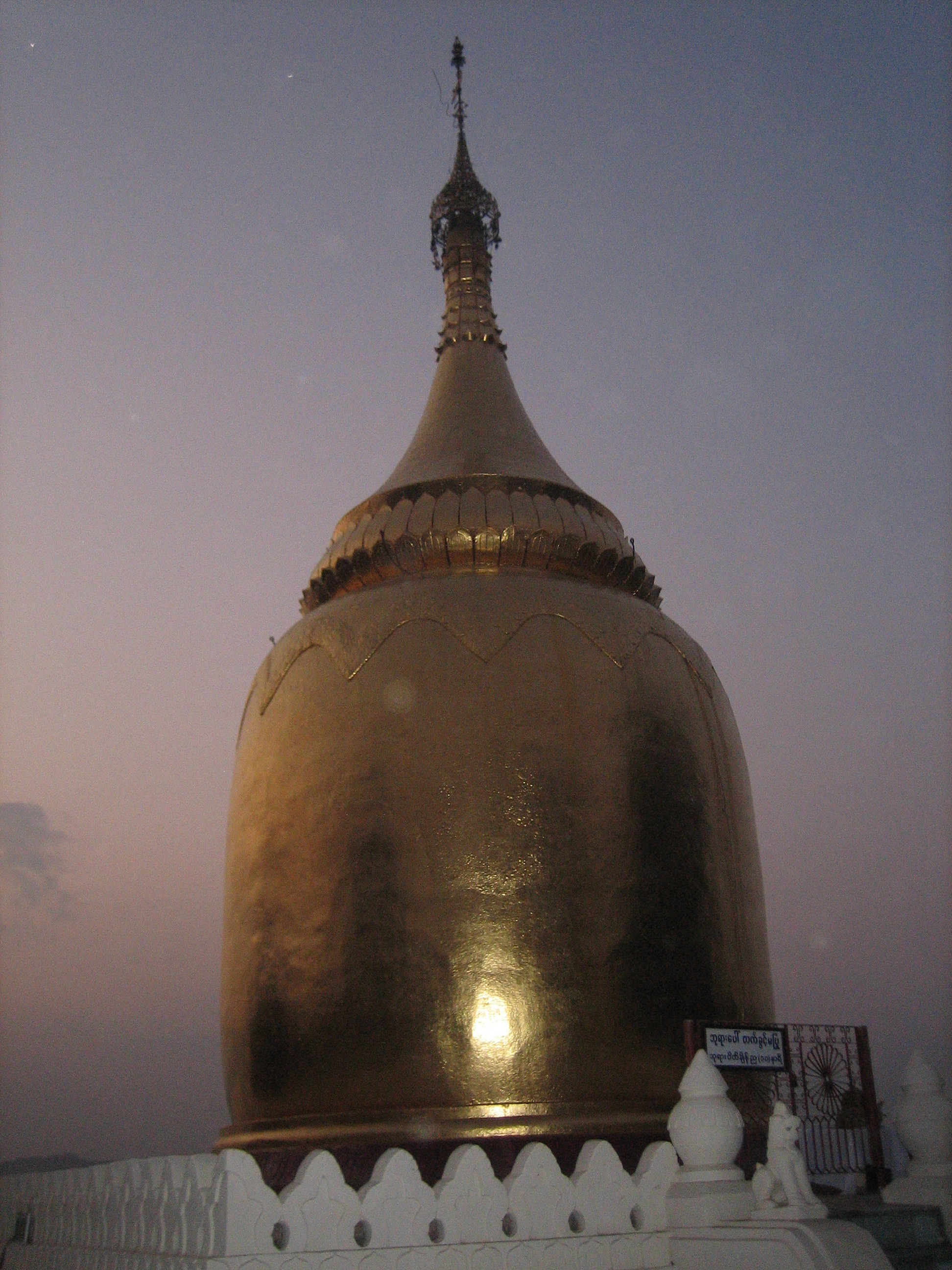
Bupaya (pre-11th century)

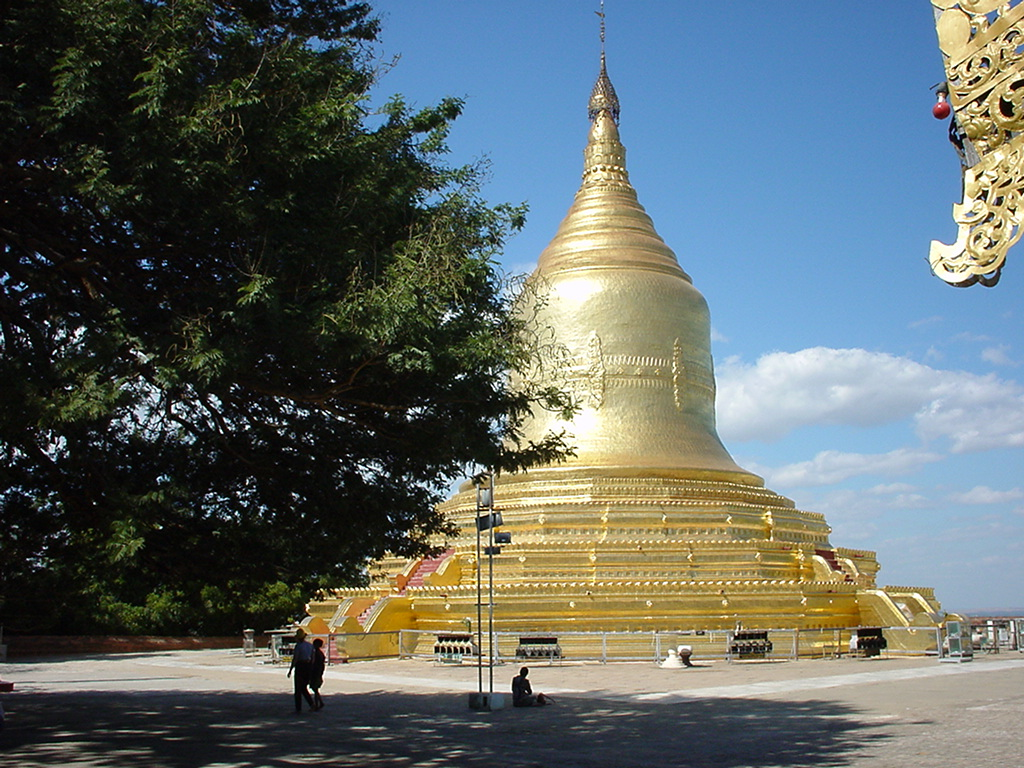
The Lawkananda (pre-11th century)

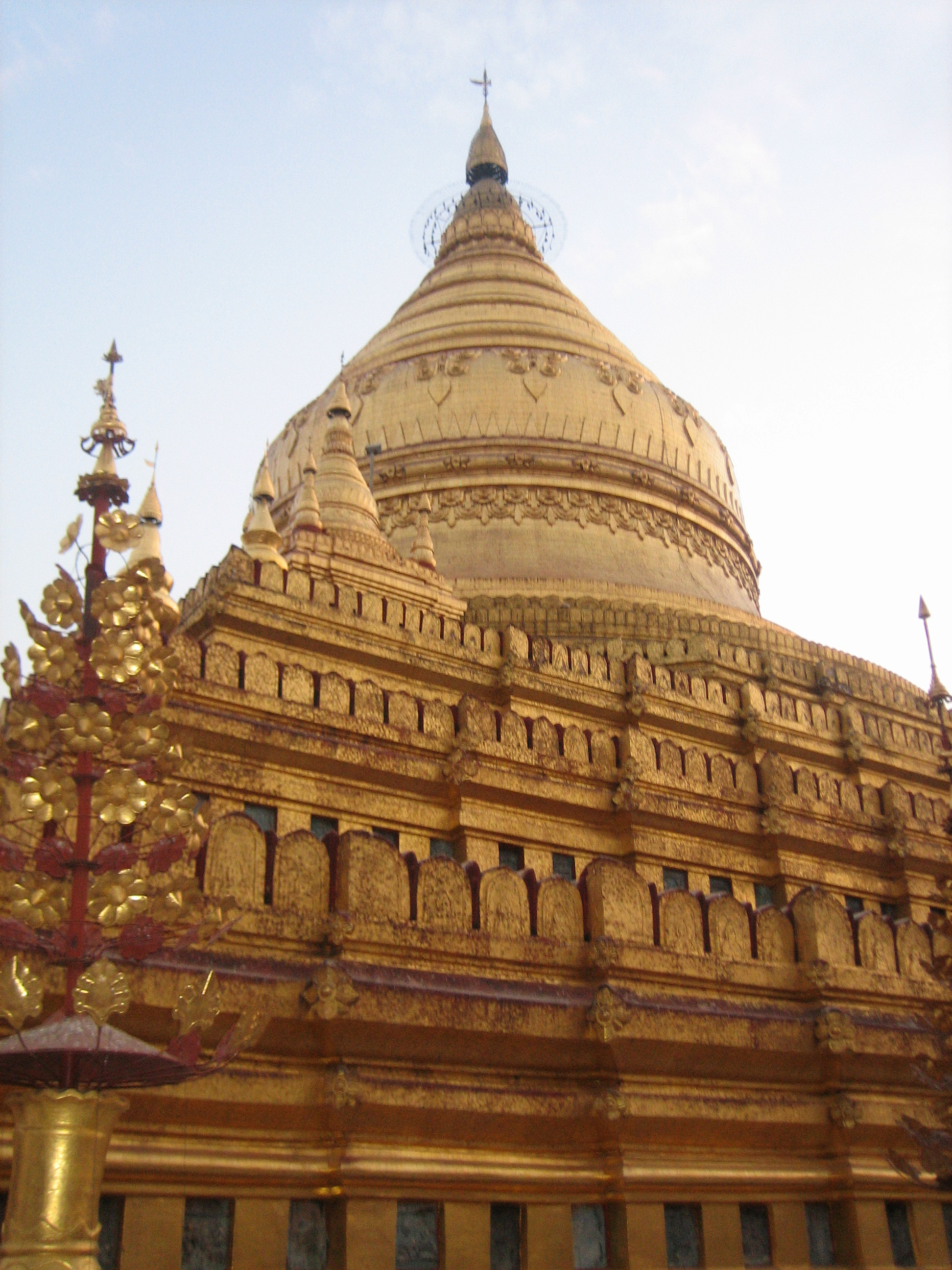
The Shwezigon (11th century)

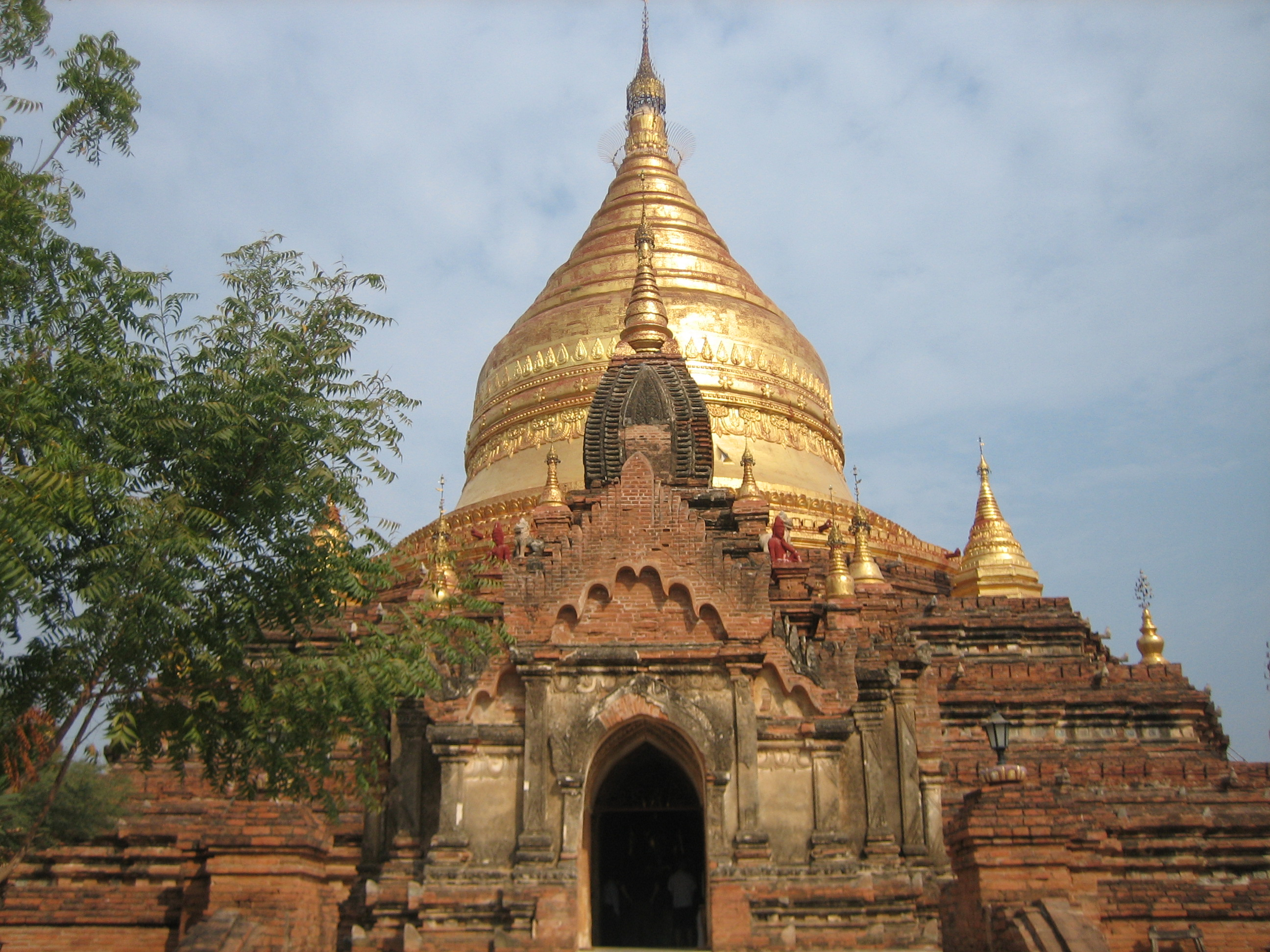
The Dhammayazika (12th century)

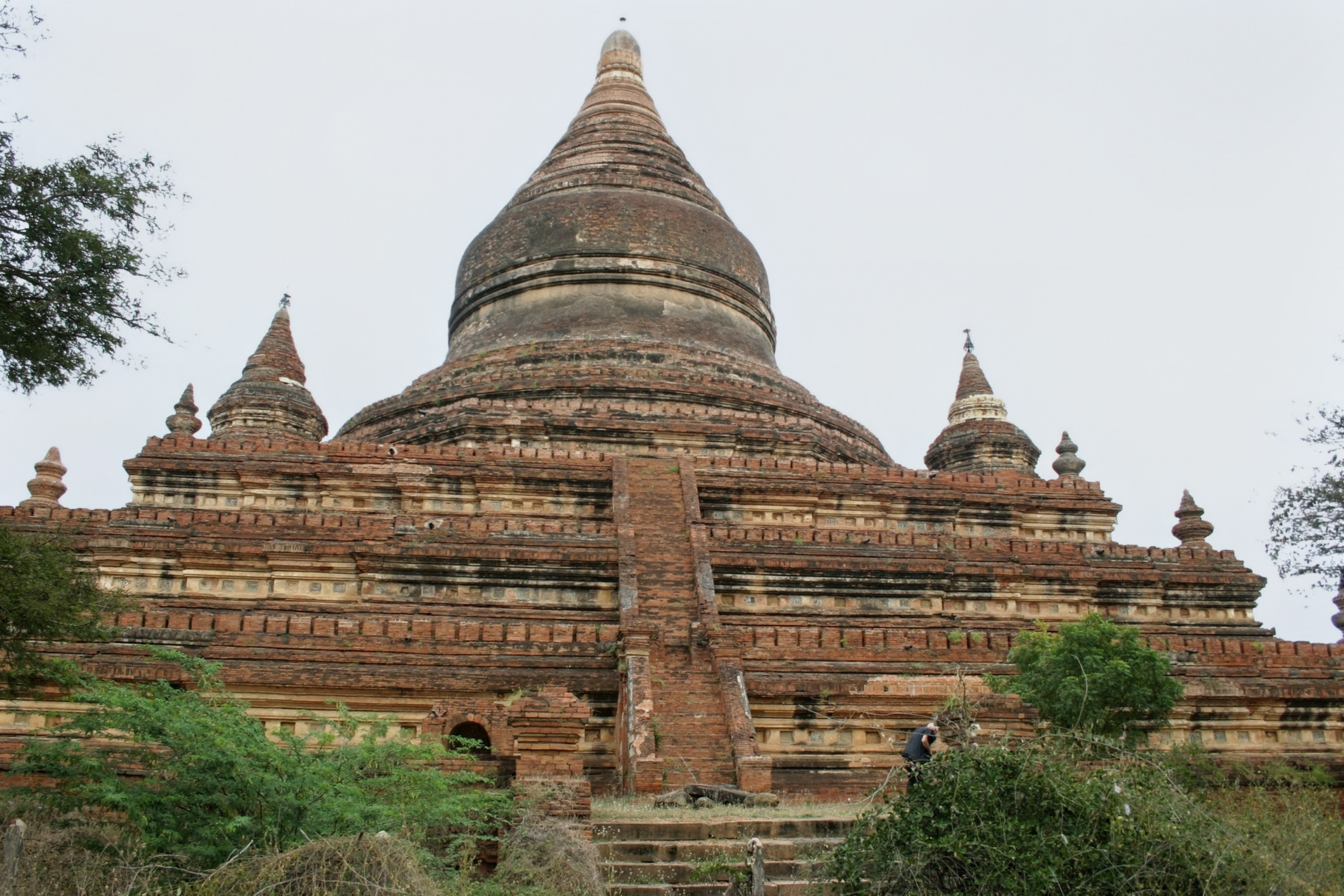
The Mingalazedi (13th century)

A stupa, also called a pagoda, is a massive structure, typically with a relic chamber inside. The Pagan stupas or pagodas evolved from earlier Pyu designs, which in turn were based on the stupa designs of the Andhra region, particularly Amaravati Stupa and Nagarjunakonda in present-day southeastern India, and to a smaller extent to Ceylon. The Pagan-era stupas in turn were the prototypes for later Burmese stupas in terms of symbolism, form and design, building techniques and even materials.

Originally, an Indian/Ceylonese stupa had a hemispheric body (Pali: anda, "the egg") on which a rectangular box surrounded by a stone balustrade (harmika) was set. Extending up from the top of the stupa was a shaft supporting several ceremonial umbrellas. The stupa is a representation of the Buddhist cosmos: its shape symbolises Mount Meru while the umbrella mounted on the brickwork represents the world's axis.

The original Indic design was gradually modified first by the Pyu, and then by Burmans at Pagan where the stupa gradually developed a longer, cylindrical form. The earliest Pagan stupas such as the Bupaya (c. 9th century) were the direct descendants of the Pyu style at Sri Ksetra. By the 11th century, the stupa had developed into a more bell-shaped form in which the parasols morphed into a series of increasingly smaller rings placed on one top of the other, rising to a point. On top the rings, the new design replaced the harmika with a lotus bud. The lotus bud design then evolved into the "banana bud", which forms the extended apex of most Burmese pagodas. Three or four rectangular terraces served as the base for a pagoda, often with a gallery of terra-cotta tiles depicting Buddhist jataka stories. The Shwezigon Pagoda and the Shwesandaw Pagoda are the earliest examples of this type. Examples of the trend toward a more bell-shaped design gradually gained primacy as seen in the Dhammayazika Pagoda (late 12th century) and the Mingalazedi Pagoda (late 13th century).

==== Hollow temples ====
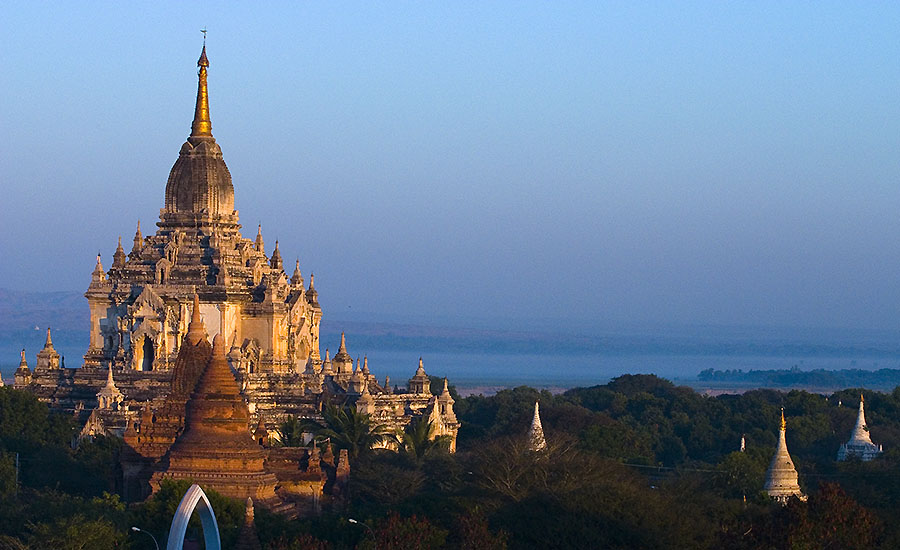
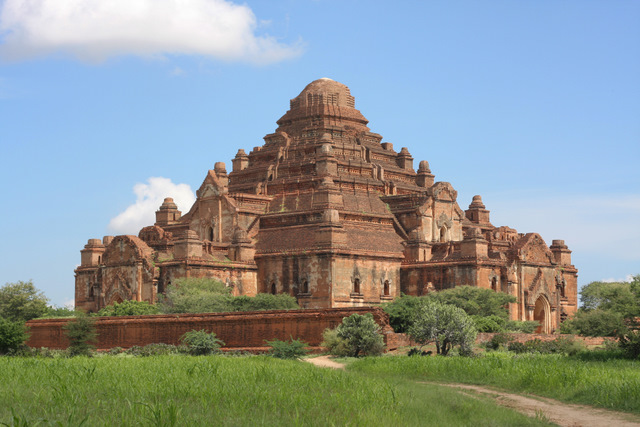
"One-face"-style Gawdawpalin Temple (left) and "four-face" Dhammayangyi Temple

In contrast to the stupas, the hollow gu-style temple is a structure used for meditation, devotional worship of the Buddha and other Buddhist rituals. The gu temples come in two basic styles: "one-face" design and "four-face" design—essentially one main entrance and four main entrances. Other styles such as five-face and hybrids also exist. The one-face style grew out of 2nd century Beikthano, and the four-face out of 7th-century Sri Ksetra. The temples, whose main features were the pointed arches and the vaulted chamber, became larger and grander in the Pagan period.

==== Innovations ====
Although the Burmese temple designs evolved from Indic, Pyu (and possibly Mon) styles, the techniques of vaulting seem to have developed in Pagan itself. The earliest vaulted temples in Pagan date to the 11th century while the vaulting did not become widespread in India until the late 12th century. The masonry of the buildings shows "an astonishing degree of perfection", where many of the immense structures survived the 1975 earthquake more or less intact. (Unfortunately, the vaulting techniques of the Pagan era were lost in the later periods. Only much smaller gu style temples were built after Pagan. In the 18th century, for example, King Bodawpaya attempted to build the Mingun Pagoda, in the form of spacious vaulted chambered temple but failed as craftsmen and masons of the later era had lost the knowledge of vaulting and keystone arching to reproduce the spacious interior space of the Pagan hollow temples.)

Another architectural innovation originated in Pagan is the Buddhist temple with a pentagonal floor plan. This design grew out of hybrid (between one-face and four-face designs) designs. The idea was to include the veneration of the Maitreya Buddha, the future and fifth Buddha of this era, in addition to the four who had already appeared. The Dhammayazika and the Ngamyethna Pagoda are examples of the pentagonal design.

== Legacy ==
The kingdom of Pagan, the "charter polity" of Myanmar, had a lasting impact on Burmese history and the history of mainland Southeast Asia. The success and longevity of Pagan's dominance over the Irrawaddy valley enabled the ascent of Burmese language and culture, and the spread of Bamar ethnicity in Upper Myanmar and laid the foundation for their continued spread elsewhere in later centuries. The 250-year rule left a proven system of administrative and cultural norms that would be adopted and extended by successor kingdoms—not only by the Burmese-speaking Ava Kingdom but also by the Mon-speaking Hanthawaddy Kingdom and Shan-speaking Shan states.

Continued cultural integration in an otherwise politically fragmented post-Pagan Myanmar set the stage for a resurgence of a unified Burmese state in the 16th century. An apt comparison can be made with the Khmer Empire, the other Southeast Asian Empire that Mongol invasions toppled. Various Tai-Shan peoples, who came down with the Mongols, came to dominate the political landscapes of the two former empires. Whereas Myanmar would see a resurgence, the post-Mongol Khmer state was reduced to a mere shadow of her former self, never to regain her preeminence. Only in the former Khmer Empire, did the Thai/Lao ethnicity and Thai/Lao languages spread permanently at the expense of the Mon-Khmer speaking peoples, not unlike the Burman takeover of the Pyu realm four centuries earlier. In Myanmar, the result was the opposite: the Shan leadership, as well as lowland Shan immigrants of Myinsaing, Pinya, Sagaing and Ava Kingdoms came to adopt Burmese cultural norms, the Burmese language, and the Bamar ethnicity. The convergence of cultural norms around existing Pagan-centered norms, at least in the Irrawaddy valley core, in turn facilitated the latter-day political reunification drives of Toungoo and Konbaung dynasties.

The Pagan Empire also changed the history of mainland Southeast Asia. Geopolitically, Pagan checked the Khmer Empire's encroachment into the Tenasserim coast and upper Menam valley. Culturally, the emergence of Pagan as a Theravada stronghold in the face of an expanding Hindu Khmer Empire from the 11th to 13th centuries provided the Buddhist school, which had been in retreat elsewhere in South Asia and Southeast Asia, a much needed reprieve and a safe shelter. Not only did Pagan help restart Theravada Buddhism in Ceylon but the over two centuries of patronage by a powerful empire made Theravada Buddhism's later growth in Lan Na (northern Thailand), Siam (central Thailand), Lan Xang (Laos), and Khmer Empire (Cambodia) in the 13th and 14th centuries possible. (Note: (Ricklefs et al 2010: 45–48): The spread of Theravada Buddhism in Siam, Lan Xang and Cambodia was also aided by the interaction with Ceylon. However, the Ceylonese interaction was possible only because the Theravada monk order was restarted in 1071–1072 by the monks from Pagan per (Harvey 1925: 32–33) and (Htin Aung 1967: 35).)

== See also ==
- Burmese monarchs' family tree
- List of Burmese monarchs
- Mrauk-U Kingdom
- Shan states

== Bibliography ==
- Aung-Thwin, Michael (1985). Pagan: The Origins of Modern Burma. Honolulu: University of Hawai'i Press. ISBN 0-8248-0960-2.
- Aung-Thwin, Michael (2005). The mists of Rāmañña: The Legend that was Lower Burma (illustrated ed.). Honolulu: University of Hawai'i Press. ISBN 9780824828868.
- Charney, Michael W. (2006). Powerful Learning: Buddhist Literati and the Throne in Burma's Last Dynasty, 1752–1885. Ann Arbor: University of Michigan.ISBN 978-0-89148-093-8
- Coedès, George (1968). Walter F. Vella (ed.). The Indianized States of Southeast Asia. trans.Susan Brown Cowing. University of Hawaii Press. ISBN 978-0-8248-0368-1.
- Cooler, Richard M. (2002). "The Art and Culture of Burma". Northern Illinois University. Archived from the original on 26 December 2016.
- Dijk, Wil O. (2006). Seventeenth-century Burma and the Dutch East India Company, 1634–1680 (illustrated ed.). Singapore: NUS Press. ISBN 9789971693046.
- Hall, D.G.E. (1960). Burma (3rd ed.). Hutchinson University Library. ISBN 978-1-4067-3503-1.
- Harvey, G. E. (1925). History of Burma: From the Earliest Times to 10 March 1824. London: Frank Cass & Co. Ltd.
- Htin Aung, Maung (1967). A History of Burma. New York and London: Cambridge University Press.
- Kala, U (1720). Maha Yazawin Gyi (in Burmese). Vol. 1–3 (2006, 4th printing ed.). Yangon: Ya-Pyei Publishing.
- Köllner, Helmut; Axel Bruns (1998). Myanmar (Burma) (illustrated ed.). Hunter Publishing. p. 255. ISBN 9783886184156.
- Kyaw Thet (1962). History of Burma (in Burmese). Yangon: Yangon University Press.
- Lieberman, Victor B. (2003). Strange Parallels: Southeast Asia in Global Context, c. 800–1830, volume 1, Integration on the Mainland. Cambridge University Press. ISBN 978-0-521-80496-7.
- Moore, Elizabeth H. (2007). Early Landscapes of Myanmar. Bangkok: River Books. ISBN 978-974-9863-31-2.
- Myint-U, Thant (2006). The River of Lost Footsteps – Histories of Burma. Farrar, Straus and Giroux. ISBN 978-0-374-16342-6.
- Pan Hla, Nai (1968). Razadarit Ayedawbon (in Burmese) (8th printing, 2004 ed.). Yangon: Armanthit Sarpay.
- Ricklefs, M.C.; Bruce McFarland Lockhart; Albert Lau; Portia Reyes; Maitrii Aung-Thwin; Bruce Lockhart (2010). A New History of Southeast Asia. Palgrave Macmillan. p. 544. ISBN 978-0230212145.
- Royal Historical Commission of Burma (1829–1832). Hmannan Yazawin (in Burmese). Vol. 1–3 (2003 ed.). Yangon: Ministry of Information, Myanmar.
- Than Tun (December 1959). "History of Burma: A.D. 1300–1400". Journal of Burma Research Society. XLII (II).
- Than Tun (1964). Studies in Burmese History (in Burmese). Vol. 1. Yangon: Maha Dagon.
- Wicks, Robert S. (1992). Money, markets, and trade in early Southeast Asia: the development of indigenous monetary systems to AD 1400. SEAP Publications. ISBN 9780877277101.
