= Ale Pyinthe (Saw Rahan II) =

Ale Pyinthe အလယ်ပြင်သည်

Queen of the Central Palace of Pagan
- Tenure: ? – 1021
- Predecessor: ?
- Successor: vacant
- Born: Pagan (Bagan)
- Spouse: Saw Rahan II (?–1001); Kunhsaw Kyaunghpyu (1001–1021)
- Issue: Sokkate
- House: Pagan
- Religion: Theravada Buddhism

Ale Pyinthe (Burmese: အလယ်ပြင်သည်, pronounced [ʔəlɛ̀ bjìɴ ðɛ̀]; lit. "Queen of the Central Palace") was a queen consort of kings Saw Rahan II and Kunhsaw Kyaunghpyu of the Pagan Dynasty of Myanmar. She was also the mother of King Sokkate.

When Kunhsaw assassinated Nyuang-u and became king, he married Nyuang-u's three chief queens, two of whom, including Ale Pyinthe, were pregnant and subsequently gave birth to Kyiso and Sokkate.

According to the royal chronicles, she was of royal descent and had an elder sister and a younger sister. She and her two sisters were married off to King Saw Rahan. Her two sisters became known as Taung Pyinthe ("Queen of Southern Palace") and Myauk Pyinthe ("Queen of the Northern Palace") while she received the title, Ale Pyinthe ("Queen of the Central Palace").

== Bibliography ==
- Maha Sithu (1798). Myint Swe; Kyaw Win; Thein Hlaing (eds.). Yazawin Thit (in Burmese). Vol. 1–3 (2012, 2nd printing ed.). Yangon: Ya-Pyei Publishing.
- Royal Historical Commission of Burma (1832). Hmannan Yazawin (in Burmese). Vol. 1–3 (2003 ed.). Yangon: Ministry of Information, Myanmar.

Ale Pyinthe (Saw Rahan II) Pagan Kingdom
Royal titles
Preceded by	Queen of the Central Palace of Pagan ? – 1014?	Vacant
