= Myauk Pyinthe (Kunhsaw) =

Myauk Pyinthe မြောက်ပြင်သည်

Chief Queen Consort of Pagan
- Tenure: 1038 – 1044
- Successor: Pyinsa Kalayani

Queen Mother of Pagan
- Tenure: c. 1044–c. 1048
- Born: c. 990; Pagan (Bagan)
- Died: Unknown; Pagan
- Spouse: Saw Rahan II; Kunhsaw Kyaunghpyu; Sokkate
- Issue: Anawrahta
- House: Pagan
- Religion: Theravada Buddhism

Myauk Pyinthe (Burmese: မြောက်ပြင်သည်, pronounced [mjauʔ pjìɴ ðɛ̀] or [mjauʔ bjìɴ ðɛ̀]; was a queen consort of three kings of Pagan;Saw Rahan II, Kunhsaw Kyaunghpyu and Sokkate, and queen mother of King Anawrahta, the founder of the Pagan Empire.

== Brief ==
According to the royal chronicles, she was of royal descent and the youngest of three sisters. She and her two elder sisters were married off to King Saw Rahan (c. 1000). Her two elder sisters became known as Taung Pyinthe ("Queen of the Southern Palace") and Ale Pyinthe ("Queen of the Central Palace"), while she received the title Myauk Pyinthe ("Queen of the Northern Palace"). In 1001, they became queens consort of Kunhsaw, who seized the throne by assassinating Saw Rahan. On 11 May 1014, Myauk Pyinthe gave birth to a child, Min Saw (later known as Anawrahta). She later became Queen of the Southern Palace, or the chief queen.

In 1021, Kunhsaw was overthrown and forced to become a monk by his adopted sons Kyiso and Sokkate. Myauk Pyinthe and Min Saw also moved next to the monastery where the deposed king lived on as a monk. The arrangement lasted until 1044, when Sokkate, who had become king since 1044, forcibly raised Myauk Pyinthe, his maternal aunt, as his queen. It angered Min Saw, who promptly revolted against his cousin. Min Saw slayed Sokkate on 11 August 1044 in single combat on horseback and seized the throne. (Note: Per Zata's horoscope section (Zata 1960: 83) as translated by the editors of (Yazawin Thit Vol. 1 2012: 95, footnote #1).) Chronicles say that the queen dedicated two temples named Pottalin and Yin-Wut-Kyut, after hearing the news of her son's victory over Sokkate.

Anawrahta also dignified his mother as a queen mother.

== Bibliography ==
- Maha Sithu (2012) [1798]. Kyaw Win; Thein Hlaing (eds.). Yazawin Thit (in Burmese). Vol. 1–3 (2nd printing ed.). Yangon: Ya-Pyei Publishing.
- Royal Historians of Burma (c. 1680). U Hla Tin (Hla Thamein) (ed.). Zatadawbon Yazawin (1960 ed.). Historical Research Directorate of the Union of Burma.
- Royal Historical Commission of Burma (1832). Hmannan Yazawin (in Burmese). Vol. 1–3 (2003 ed.). Yangon: Ministry of Information, Myanmar.

Myauk Pyinthe (Kunhsaw) Pagan Kingdom Born: c. 990
Royal titles
| Preceded by Taung Pyinthe | Chief Queen Consort of Pagan; 1014–1021 | Succeeded by Pyinsa Kalayani |
| Preceded by | Queen Mother of Pagan; 1044–1048 | Succeeded by |
