= Taung Pyinthe (Saw Rahan II) =

Taung Pyinthe တောင်ပြင်သည်

Chief queen consort of Pagan
- Tenure: ? – 1021
- Predecessor: ?
- Successor: Myauk Pyinthe
- Born: Pagan (Bagan)
- Spouse: Saw Rahan II (?–1001); Kunhsaw Kyaunghpyu (1001–1021)
- Issue: Kyiso
- House: Pagan
- Religion: Theravada Buddhism

Taung Pyinthe (Burmese: တောင်ပြင်သည်, pronounced [tàʊɴ bjìɴ ðɛ̀]; lit. "Queen of the Southern Palace") was the Chief queen consort of kings Sawrahan II and Kunhsaw Kyaunghpyu of the Pagan Dynasty of Myanmar. She was also the mother of King Kyiso Sawrahan, a son of Sawrahan.

According to the royal chronicles, she was of royal descent and the eldest of three sisters. She and her two sisters were married off to King Sawrahan. Her two younger sisters became known as Myauk Pyinthe ("Queen of the Northern Palace") and Ale Pyinthe ("Queen of the Central Palace") while she received the title, Taung Pyinthe ("Queen of the Southern Palace").

== Bibliography ==
- Maha Sithu (2012) [1798]. Kyaw Win; Thein Hlaing (eds.). Yazawin Thit (in Burmese). Vol. 1–3 (2nd ed.). Yangon: Ya-Pyei Publishing.
- Royal Historical Commission of Burma (1832). Hmannan Yazawin (in Burmese). Vol. 1–3 (2003 ed.). Yangon: Ministry of Information, Myanmar.

Taung Pyinthe (Saw Rahan II) Pagan Kingdom
Royal titles
Preceded by	Chief queen consort of Pagan ? – 1014	Succeeded by Myauk Pyinthe
