= Tannet of Pagan =

Tannet တန်နက်

King of Pagan
- Reign: 876–904
- Predecessor: Pyinbya
- Successor: Sale Ngahkwe
- Born: 859; Friday born Pagan
- Died: 904; Pagan
- Issue: Kunhsaw Kyaunghpyu? (oral tradition)
- House: Pagan
- Father: Pyinbya
- Religion: Theravada Buddhism

Tannet (Burmese: တန်နက်, pronounced [tàɰ̃ nɛʔ]; 859–904) was a king of the Pagan dynasty of Burma (Myanmar) from c. 876 to c. 904. A son of King Pyinbya, the founder of Pagan (Bagan), Tannet was the paternal grandfather of King Anawrahta, the founder of Pagan Empire. The king loved horses and was a master of horsemanship. He was assassinated by Sale Ngahkwe, his stable groom, who succeeded him as king.

Various Burmese chronicles do not agree on the dates regarding his life and reign. The oldest chronicle Zatadawbon Yazawin is considered to be the most accurate for the Pagan period. (Note: (Maha Yazawin 2006: 346–349): Among the four major chronicles, only Zatadawbon Yazawin's dates line up with Anawrahta's inscriptionally verified accession date of 1044 CE. (Aung-Thwin 2005: 121–123): In general, Zata is considered "the most accurate of all Burmese chronicles, particularly with regard to the best-known Pagan and Ava kings, many of whose dates have been corroborated by epigraphy.") The table below lists the dates given by four main chronicles, as well as Hmannan's dates when anchored by the Anawrahta's inscriptionally verified accession date of 1044.

Chronicles	Birth–Death	Age	Reign	Length of reign
Zatadawbon Yazawin	859–904	45	876–904	28
Maha Yazawin	841–876	35	858–876	18
Yazawin Thit and Hmannan Yazawin	851–906	55	878–906	28
Hmannan adjusted	879–934	55	906–934	28

== Bibliography ==
- Aung-Thwin, Michael A. (2005). The Mists of Rāmañña: The Legend that was Lower Burma (illustrated ed.). Honolulu: University of Hawai'i Press. ISBN 9780824828868.
- Kala, U (1724). Maha Yazawin (in Burmese). Vol. 1–3 (2006, 4th printing ed.). Yangon: Ya-Pyei Publishing.
- Royal Historical Commission of Burma (1832). Hmannan Yazawin (in Burmese). Vol. 1–3 (2003 ed.). Yangon: Ministry of Information, Myanmar.

Tannet of Pagan Pagan Dynasty Born: c. 859 Died: c. 904
Regnal titles
Preceded by Pyinbya	King of Pagan c. 876 – 904	Succeeded by Sale Ngahkwe
