= Pyinbya =

Pyinbya ပျဉ်ပြား

King of Pagan
- Reign: 846–876
- Predecessor: Khelu
- Successor: Tannet
- Born: 817; Monday born
- Died: 876 (aged 59); Pagan
- Issue: Tannet
- House: Pagan
- Father: Saw Khin Hnit
- Religion: Theravada Buddhism

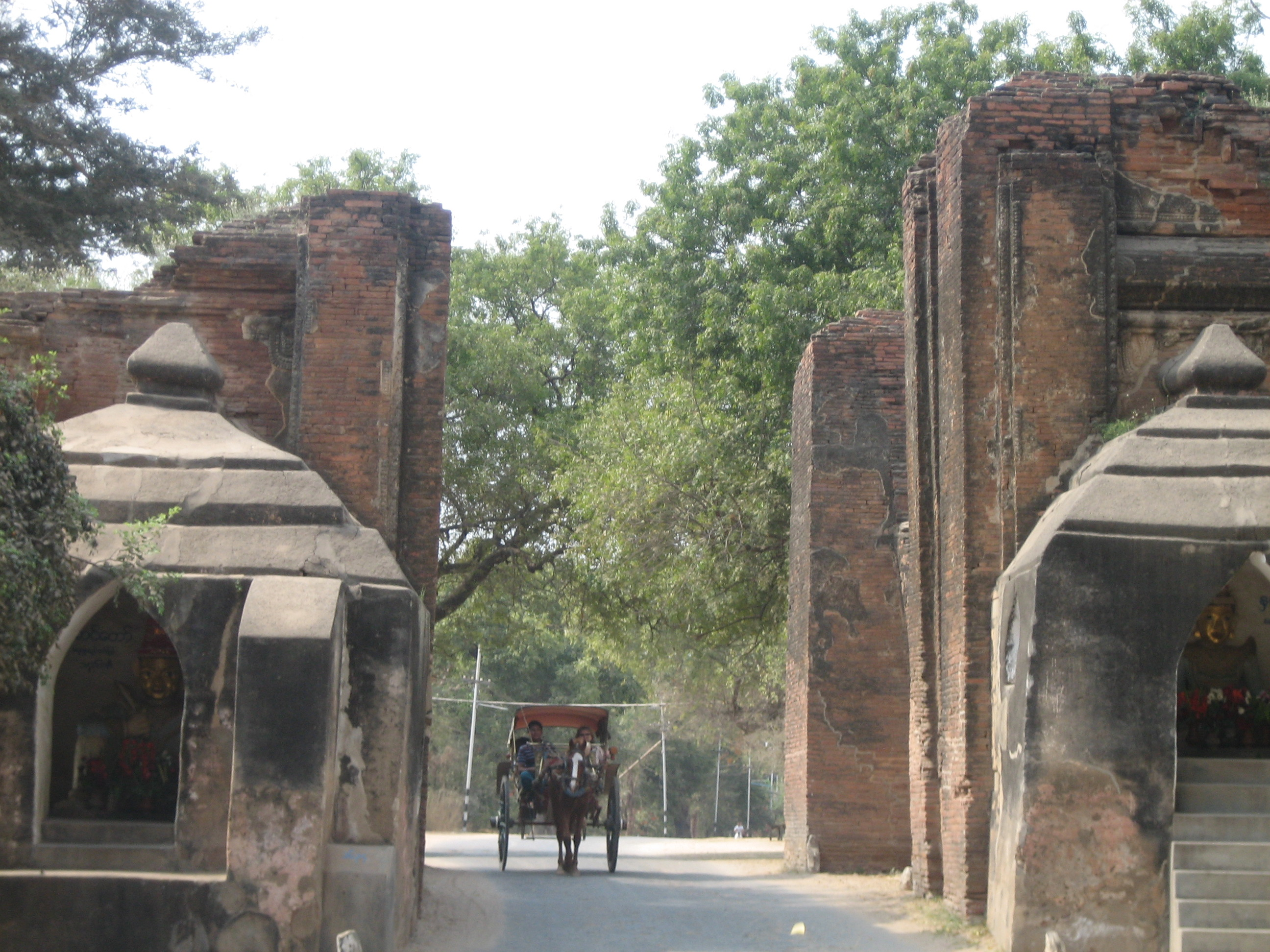
Tharaba Gate.JPG

Pyinbya (Burmese: ပျဉ်ပြား, pronounced [pjɪ̀ɰ̃bjá]; 817–876) was the king of the Pagan Dynasty of Burma (Myanmar) who founded the city of Pagan (Bagan) in 849 CE. Though the Burmese chronicles describe him as the 33rd king of the dynasty founded in early 2nd century CE, modern historians consider Pyinbya one of the first kings of Pagan, which would gradually take over present-day central Burma in the next two hundred years. He was the paternal great-grandfather of King Anawrahta, the founder of the Pagan Empire.

== Chronicle tradition ==
According to the Burmese chronicles, the future king was born to King Saw Khin Hnit of Pagan. He was born in either 817 CE (or 802 CE). He was lord of Pyinbya village of Pagan prior to his accession, and known as Pyinbya Mintha. He succeeded his brother King Khelu as king in 846 CE. He founded the city of Pagan on 23 December 849 (6th waxing of Pyatho 211 ME). He also founded a settlement of Taungdwin in 857, perhaps the southernmost limit of his nascent kingdom. He died in 876 CE at age 59 (in his 60th year). (Note that main Burmese chronicles do not agree on his regnal years or birth and death years. The oldest chronicle Zatadawbon Yazawin is considered to be the most accurate for the Pagan period.) (Note: (Maha Yazawin 2006: 346–349): Among the four major chronicles, only Zatadawbon Yazawin's dates line up with Anawrahta's inscriptionally verified accession date of 1044 CE. (Aung-Thwin 2005: 121–123): In general, Zata is considered "the most accurate of all Burmese chronicles, particularly with regard to the best-known Pagan and Ava kings, many of whose dates have been corroborated by epigraphy.") The table below lists the dates given by four main chronicles, as well as Hmannan's dates when anchored by the Anawrahta's inscriptionally verified accession date of 1044.

Chronicles	Birth–Death	Age	Reign	Length of reign
Zatadawbon Yazawin	817–876	59	846–876	30
Maha Yazawin	817–858	41	846–858	12
Yazawin Thit and Hmannan Yazawin	802–878	76	846–878	32
Hmannan adjusted	830–906	76	874–906	32

Pyinbya was succeeded by his son Tannet.

== Scholarship views ==
According to mainstream scholarship, Pyinbya is one of the earliest kings of Pagan, founded by the Mranma (Bamar / Burmans) of the Nanzhao Kingdom. Pagan is the first known Burman settlement in the Irrawaddy valley, following the devastating raids into upper Irrawaddy valley by Nanzhao that lasted from the 750s to the 830s. After the attacks, which left the Pyu states severely weakened, large numbers of Mranma warriors of Nanzhao and their families remained in the upper Irrawaddy valley. Pagan was founded as a fortified settlement along a bend in the Irrawaddy river. The new settlement may have been designed to help the Nanzhao pacify the surrounding countryside. It was a certainly a strategic spot, close to the Chindwin river and just to the west of a richly irrigated rice plain.

Pagan was one of several competing city-states until the late 10th century when it grew in authority and grandeur. Two hundred years after Pyinbya founded Pagan, his great-grandson Anawrahta went on to create the Pagan Empire, the first ever unification of the Irrawaddy valley and its periphery.

== Bibliography ==
- Aung-Thwin, Michael A. (2005). The Mists of Rāmañña: The Legend that was Lower Burma (illustrated ed.). Honolulu: University of Hawai'i Press. ISBN 9780824828868.
- Kala, U (1724). Maha Yazawin (in Burmese). Vol. 1–3 (2006, 4th printing ed.). Yangon: Ya-Pyei Publishing.
- Lieberman, Victor B. (2003). Strange Parallels: Southeast Asia in Global Context, c. 800–1830, volume 1, Integration on the Mainland. Cambridge University Press. ISBN 978-0-521-80496-7.
- Myint-U, Thant (2006). The River of Lost Footsteps—Histories of Burma. Farrar, Straus and Giroux. ISBN 978-0-374-16342-6.
- Royal Historical Commission of Burma (1832). Hmannan Yazawin (in Burmese). Vol. 1–3 (2003 ed.). Yangon: Ministry of Information, Myanmar.

Pyinbya Pagan Dynasty Born: c. 817 Died: c. 876
Regnal titles
Preceded by Khelu	King of Pagan c. 846 – 876	Succeeded by Tannet
