= Theinhko =

Theinhko သိန်းခို

King of Pagan
- Reign: c. 934–956
- Predecessor: Sale Ngahkwe
- Successor: Nyaung-u Sawrahan
- Born: c. 919 (Saturday born); Pagan
- Died: c. 956; Pagan
- House: Pagan
- Father: Sale Ngahkwe
- Religion: Theravada Buddhism

Theinhko (Burmese: သိန်းခို; also Theinkho, pronounced [θéɪ̯ɰ̃kʰò]; c. 919 – 956) was king of the Pagan dynasty of Burma (Myanmar) from c. 934 to c. 956. According to the Burmese chronicles, Theinhko was a son of the previous king, Sale Ngahkwe. Theinhko was killed by a farmer, Nyaung-u Sawrahan, from whose farm he took a cucumber. The king had been on a hunting trip and separated from his retinue, exhausted and thirsty. The farmer was accepted as king by the queen to prevent unrest in the kingdom and became known as the "Cucumber King", "farmer king" or "Taungthugyi Min".

The story is likely a fairy tale. There are at least three other versions—an exact parallel in the Burmese fairy tale "Princess Thudhammasari" and two variants in Cambodian history, one in the eighth and another in the 14th century. Kings of Cambodia claim descent from the gardener.

Various chronicles do not agree on the dates regarding his life and reign. The oldest chronicle Zatadawbon Yazawin is considered to be the most accurate for the Pagan period. (Note: (Maha Yazawin 2006: 346–349): Among the four major chronicles, only Zatadawbon Yazawin's dates line up with Anawrahta's inscriptionally verified accession date of 1044 CE. (Aung-Thwin 2005: 121–123): In general, Zata is considered "the most accurate of all Burmese chronicles, particularly with regard to the best-known Pagan and Ava kings, many of whose dates have been corroborated by epigraphy.") The table below lists the dates given by four main chronicles, as well as Hmannan's dates when anchored by the Anawrahta's inscriptionally verified accession date of 1044.

Chronicles	Birth–Death	Age	Reign	Length of reign
Zatadawbon Yazawin	919–956	37	934–956	26
Maha Yazawin	880–917	37	901–917	16
Yazawin Thit and Hmannan Yazawin	891–931	40	915–931	16
Hmannan adjusted	919–959	40	943–959	16

== Bibliography ==
- Aung-Thwin, Michael A. (2005). The Mists of Rāmañña: The Legend that was Lower Burma (illustrated ed.). Honolulu: University of Hawai'i Press. ISBN 9780824828868.
- Harvey, G. E. (1925). History of Burma: From the Earliest Times to 10 March 1824. London: Frank Cass & Co. Ltd.
- Kala, U (1724). Maha Yazawin (in Burmese). Vol. 1–3 (2006, 4th printing ed.). Yangon: Ya-Pyei Publishing.
- Royal Historical Commission of Burma (1832). Hmannan Yazawin (in Burmese). Vol. 1–3 (2003 ed.). Yangon: Ministry of Information, Myanmar.

Theinhko Pagan Dynasty Born: c. 919 Died: c. 956
Regnal titles
Preceded by Sale Ngahkwe	King of Pagan c. 934–956	Succeeded by Nyaung-u Sawrahan
