= Kunhsaw Kyaunghpyu =

Kunhsaw Kyaunghpyu ကွမ်းဆော် ကြောင်းဖြူ
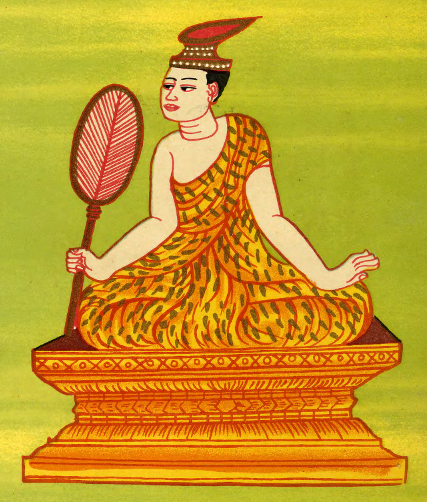
- Kunhsaw Kyaunghpyu depicted as Htibyuhsaung nat (spirit)

King of Pagan
- Reign: 1001–1021
- Predecessor: Nyaung-u Sawrahan
- Successor: Kyiso
- Born: 955/56; Sunday, 317 ME; Pagan
- Died: 1048; Pagan
- Consort: Taung Pyinthe; Myauk Pyinthe; Ale Pyinthe
- Issue: Anawrahta
- House: Pagan
- Father: Tannet of Pagan
- Mother: Htibyuhsaung Medaw
- Religion: Theravada Buddhism

Kunhsaw Kyaunghpyu (Burmese: ကွမ်းဆော် ကြောင်းဖြူ [kʊ́ɰ̃ sʰɔ̀ tɕáʊɰ̃ bjù]; c. 955–1048) was king of the Pagan Dynasty of Burma (Myanmar) from 1001 to 1021. He was the father of Anawrahta, the founder of Pagan Empire. The principality of Pagan continued to gain strength during his reign. Pagan's surviving walls were most likely constructed during his reign.

Kunhsaw is part of the pantheon of Burmese nats (spirits) as Htihpyusaung Nat.

== Brief ==
According to the Burmese chronicles, Kunhsaw Kyaunghpyu was a son of an early Pagan king Tannet, who was assassinated when his queen was pregnant with Kunhsaw. However Tannet died in the early 10th century. It is more likely that he was a descendant of Tannet. He took over the Pagan throne from King Nyaung-u Sawrahan, and married three of Nyaung-u's chief queens, two of whom were pregnant and subsequently gave birth to Kyiso and Sokkate. Kunhsaw raised Sokkate and Kyiso as his own sons. When the two sons reached manhood, they forced Kunhsaw to abdicate the throne and become a monk. Kyiso took over as king.

He lost the throne in 1021 although various chronicles do not agree on the dates regarding his life and reign. The oldest chronicle Zatadawbon Yazawin is considered to be the most accurate for the Pagan period. (Note: (Maha Yazawin 2006: 346–349): Among the four major chronicles, only Zatadawbon Yazawin's dates line up with Anawrahta's inscriptionally verified accession date of 1044 CE. (Aung-Thwin 2005: 121–123): In general, Zata is considered "the most accurate of all Burmese chronicles, particularly with regard to the best-known Pagan and Ava kings, many of whose dates have been corroborated by epigraphy.") The table below lists the dates given by four main chronicles, as well as Hmannan's dates when anchored by the Anawrahta's inscriptionally verified accession date of 1044.

Chronicles	Birth–Death	Age	Reign	Length of reign
Zatadawbon Yazawin	955–1048	93	1001–1021	20
Maha Yazawin	876–1001	125	950–971	21
Yazawin Thit and Hmannan Yazawin	907–1021	114	964–986	22
Hmannan adjusted	934–1048	114	992–1014	22

The deposed king remained a monk for over two decades. Then in 1044, Kyiso' successor Sokkate married one of Kunhsaw's queens, mother of Anawrahta, greatly angering Anawrahta. Anawrahta challenged and killed Sokkate in single combat. Anwarahta offered the throne to Kunhsaw. But the former king refused, allowing Anawrahta to ascend the throne. Kunhsaw died four years after his son Anawrahta ascended the throne c. 1048.

== Htibyuhsaung ==
Htibyuhsaung (Burmese: ထီးဖြူဆောင်း [tʰí bjù sʰáʊɰ̃]; lit. 'Lord of the White Umbrella') is one of 37 nats in the official Burmese pantheon of nats. He was King Kunhsaw Kyaunghpyu, father of Anawrahta. He was deposed and forced to become a monk by his stepsons, and died later.

== Bibliography ==
- Aung-Thwin, Michael A. (2005). The Mists of Rāmañña: The Legend that was Lower Burma (illustrated ed.). Honolulu: University of Hawai'i Press. ISBN 9780824828868.
- Harvey, G. E. (1925). History of Burma: From the Earliest Times to 10 March 1824. London: Frank Cass & Co. Ltd.
- Htin Aung, Maung (1967). A History of Burma. New York and London: Cambridge University Press.
- Kala, U (1724). Maha Yazawin (in Burmese). Vol. 1–3 (2006, 4th printing ed.). Yangon: Ya-Pyei Publishing.
- Lieberman, Victor B. (2003). Strange Parallels: Southeast Asia in Global Context, c. 800–1830, volume 1, Integration on the Mainland. Cambridge University Press. ISBN 978-0-521-80496-7.
- Royal Historical Commission of Burma (1832). Hmannan Yazawin (in Burmese). Vol. 1–3 (2003 ed.). Yangon: Ministry of Information, Myanmar.

Kunhsaw Kyaunghpyu Pagan Dynasty Born: c. 955 Died: c. 1048
Regnal titles
Preceded by Nyaung-u Sawrahan	King of Pagan c. 1001–1021	Succeeded by Kyiso
