= Sale Ngahkwe =

KING of PAGAN

Sale Ngahkwe စလေငခွေး

King of Pagan
- Reign: 904–934
- Predecessor: Tannet
- Successor: Theinhko
- Born: 875 (Saturday born); Sale
- Died: 934; Pagan
- Issue: Theinhko
- House: Pagan
- Religion: Theravada Buddhism

Sale Ngahkwe (Burmese: စလေငခွေး, pronounced [sàlè ŋəkʰwé]; c. 875–934) was king of Pagan dynasty of Burma (Myanmar) from c. 904 to c. 934. According to the Burmese chronicles, Ngahkwe, a descendant of King Thingayaza of Pagan but brought up in obscurity at Sale in central Burma, came to work in the service of King Tannet as a stable groom. Ngahkwe then assassinated the king and seized the throne.

Various Burmese chronicles do not agree on the dates regarding his life and reign. The oldest chronicle Zatadawbon Yazawin is considered to be the most accurate for the Pagan period. (Note: (Maha Yazawin 2006: 346–349): Among the four major chronicles, only Zatadawbon Yazawin's dates line up with Anawrahta's inscriptionally verified accession date of 1044 CE. (Aung-Thwin 2005: 121–123): In general, Zata is considered "the most accurate of all Burmese chronicles, particularly with regard to the best-known Pagan and Ava kings, many of whose dates have been corroborated by epigraphy.") The table below lists the dates given by four main chronicles, as well as Hmannan's dates when anchored by the Anawrahta's inscriptionally verified accession date of 1044.

| Chronicles | Birth–Death | Age | Reign | Length of reign |
|---|---|---|---|---|
| Zatadawbon Yazawin | 875–934 | 59 | 904–934 | 30 |
| Maha Yazawin | 847–901 | 54 | 876–901 | 25 |
| Yazawin Thit and Hmannan Yazawin | 857–915 | 58 | 906–915 | 9 |
| Hmannan adjusted | 885–943 | 58 | 934–943 | 9 |

== Bibliography ==
- Aung-Thwin, Michael A. (2005). The Mists of Rāmañña: The Legend that was Lower Burma (illustrated ed.). Honolulu: University of Hawai'i Press. ISBN 9780824828868.
- Kala, U (1724). Maha Yazawin (in Burmese). Vol. 1–3 (2006, 4th printing ed.). Yangon: Ya-Pyei Publishing.
- Royal Historical Commission of Burma (1832). Hmannan Yazawin (in Burmese). Vol. 1–3 (2003 ed.). Yangon: Ministry of Information, Myanmar.

Sale Ngahkwe Pagan Dynasty Born: c. 875 Died: c. 934
Regnal titles
| Preceded by Tannet | King of Pagan c. 904 – 934 | Succeeded by Theinhko |
