= Sokkate =

Sokkate; စုက္ကတေး

King of Pagan
- Reign: c. 1 April 1038 – 11 August 1044
- Predecessor: Kyiso
- Successor: Anawrahta
- Born: 29 March 1001; Saturday, 3rd waxing of Kason 363 ME (Note: According to Zatadawbon Yazawin's horoscope section, he was born on Saturday, 3rd waxing of Kason 353 ME (18 April 991) per (Yazawin Thit 2012: 93), which in turn cites (Tin Naing Toe 2006: 157). But 353 ME is in contradiction with Zata's own reporting in the regnal list (Zata 1960: 39), which states that King Kunhsaw Kyaunghpyu came to power in 363 ME, after which his brother Kyiso and he were born. The year should be 363 ME.); Pagan
- Died: 11 August 1044 (aged 43); Saturday, Full moon of Wagaung 406 ME (Note: (Hmannan Vol. 1 2003: 230) says Sokkate was overthrown on Monday, 8th waning of Pyatho, 379 ME (13 January 1018). But the Myazedi inscription and Zatadawbon Yazawin (regnal list section) both say Anawrahta came to power in 406 ME (1044/1045 CE). Assuming that 8th waning of Pyatho is correct, Anawrahta ascended the throne on 16 December 1044 (8th waning of Pyatho 406 ME). But Zata's horoscope section (Zata 1960: 83) gives 11 August 1044 according to Tin Naing Toe (as cited in (Yazawin Thit 2012: 95)).); Myinkaba
- Consort: Myauk Pyinthe
- House: Pagan
- Father: Saw Rahan II
- Mother: Ale Pyinthe
- Religion: Ari Buddhism

Sokkate (Burmese: စုက္ကတေး, pronounced [soʊʔ kə té]; 29 March 1001 – 11 August 1044) was king of Pagan dynasty of Burma (Myanmar) from 1038 to 1044. The king lost his life in a one-on-one combat with Anawrahta, who succeeded him and went on to found the Pagan Empire.

According to the chronicles, Sokkate was a son of King Nyaung-u Sawrahan whose reign was usurped by King Kunhsaw Kyaunghpyu. Kunhsaw married Nyuang-u's three chief queens, two of whom were pregnant and subsequently gave birth to Kyiso and Sokkate. Sokkate and Kyiso were raised by Kunhsaw as his own sons. When the two sons reached manhood, they forced Kunhsaw to abdicate the throne and become a monk. When Sokkate became king after Kyiso's death in a hunting accident, he took one of Kunhsaw's queens who had given birth to Anawrahta. When Anawrahta came of age, he challenged Sokkate to single combat, and killed the king.

== Dates ==
Various chronicles do not agree on the dates regarding his life and reign. The oldest chronicle Zatadawbon Yazawin is considered to be the most accurate for the Pagan period. (Note: (Maha Yazawin 2006: 346–349): Among the four major chronicles, only Zatadawbon Yazawin's dates line up with Anawrahta's inscriptionally verified accession date of 1044 CE. (Aung-Thwin 2005: 121–123): In general, Zata is considered "the most accurate of all Burmese chronicles, particularly with regard to the best-known Pagan and Ava kings, many of whose dates have been corroborated by epigraphy.") However, Zata itself is contradictory in its reporting of Sokkate's birth date: its regnal list and horoscope sections report different birth dates. The table below lists the dates given by four main chronicles, as well as Hmannan's dates when anchored by the Anawrahta's inscriptionally verified accession date of 1044. The length of reign is given as 6 years by Zata but according to the other chronicles, it was Kyiso, the predecessor, who ruled for six years. Moreover, according to Hmannan, Sokkate was three months younger than his half-brother Kyiso.

Chronicles	Birth–Death	Age	Reign	Length of reign
Zatadawbon Yazawin (List of Pagan monarchs section)	1000–1044	44	1038–1044	6
Zatadawbon Yazawin (Horoscope section)	18 April 991–11 August 1044	53	1038–11 August 1044	6
Maha Yazawin	951–1002	51	977–1002	25
Yazawin Thit and Hmannan Yazawin	965–11 January 1018	52	992–11 January 1018	25

== Accession ==
Sokkate succeeded his brother Kyiso at age 36 c. 1 April 1038. (Note: Based on Zata's reporting per (Zata 1960: 63), he came to power at age 36 in year 400 ME. It means he came to power between the new year's day of 400 ME (25 March 1038) and the day before his 37th birthday, 8 April 1038 (2nd waxing of Kason 400 ME).)

== Bibliography ==
- Aung-Thwin, Michael A. (2005). The Mists of Rāmañña: The Legend that was Lower Burma (illustrated ed.). Honolulu: University of Hawai'i Press. ISBN 9780824828868.
- Coedès, George (1968). Walter F. Vella (ed.). The Indianized States of Southeast Asia. trans.Susan Brown Cowing. University of Hawaii Press. ISBN 978-0-8248-0368-1.
- Htin Aung, Maung (1967). A History of Burma. New York and London: Cambridge University Press.
- Kala, U (1724). Maha Yazawin (in Burmese). Vol. 1–3 (2006, 4th printing ed.). Yangon: Ya-Pyei Publishing.
- Maha Sithu (2012) [1798]. Kyaw Win; Thein Hlaing (eds.). Yazawin Thit (in Burmese). Vol. 1–3 (2nd ed.). Yangon: Ya-Pyei Publishing.
- Royal Historians of Burma (c. 1680). U Hla Tin (Hla Thamein) (ed.). Zatadawbon Yazawin (1960 ed.). Historical Research Directorate of the Union of Burma.
- Royal Historical Commission of Burma (1832). Hmannan Yazawin (in Burmese). Vol. 1–3 (2003 ed.). Yangon: Ministry of Information, Myanmar.

Sokkate Pagan Dynasty Born: 29 March 1001 Died: 10 August 1044
Regnal titles
Preceded by Kyiso	King of Pagan c. 1 April 1038 – 11 August 1044	Succeeded by Anawrahta
