= Pyinsa Kalayani =

Pyinsa Kalayani ပဉ္စကလျာဏီ

Queen Mother of Pagan
- Reign: c. 1084–c. 1100s

Chief queen consort of Burma
- Reign: 1044–1048
- Predecessor: Myauk Pyinthe
- Successor: Agga Mahethi of Pagan
- Born: c. 1014; Waithali
- Spouse: Anawrahta
- Issue: Kyansittha
- House: Wethali
- Father: King of Wethali
- Religion: Theravada Buddhism

Pyinsa Kalayani (Burmese: ပဉ္စကလျာဏီ [pjɪ̀ɰ̃sa̰ kəljənì]; Pali: Pañcakalyāṇī) was the first wife and chief queen consort of King Anawratha and queen mother of King Kyansittha of Pagan Dynasty of Burma (Myanmar).

The Burmese chronicles give many inconsistent stories about her, her son and her brief husband Anawrahta. Most are regarded as legends:

She was a princess of Wethali Kingdom, who was sent to marry Anawrahta by her father the ruler of Wethali. (Wethali is believed to be in the present-day Rakhine State or in Bengal. Based on Kyansittha's features observed in his statute in the Ananda Temple, Pyinsa Kalayani was likely Indian or partly Indo-Aryan) On her way to Pagan, she allegedly had some sort of relationship with Yazataman (lit. Royal Ambassador), the Pagan official charged with guarding her. Fearing a deadly scandal, he official dispersed her retinue of 80. At Pagan, she was married to Anawrahta. Soon after the marriage, Yazataman reportedly pointed out to Anawrahta that she could not be a true royal princess because she lacked a retinue. Anawrahta then banished Pyinsa Kalayni, who was then pregnant, an area near Sagaing. There, she gave birth to Kyansittha and raised him by herself.

(The chronicle stories here are filled with many inconsistencies. The chronicles claim that Anawrahta was already king when Pyinsa Kalayni was sent. But Anawrahta did not become king until 1044. Kyansittha was born in 1030. Moreover, it was unlikely that the ruler of Wethali would have sent his daughter to Anawrahta, who until 1044 was a prince but not to Sokkate, the king himself. The chronicles also claim that Anawrahta tried to kill off all babies in the year that Kyansittha was born because his astrologers predicted that a newborn would be king. Again, Anawrahta was not the king.)

History shows that Anawrahta did not seem to know (or care) about her alleged affair with Yazataman, and believed that Kyansittha was his legitimate son. He recalled Kyansittha to Pagan in the mid-1050s and appointed the 15-year-old Kyansittha a senior commander in his army. Only the royalty could become a senior commander at a young age.

== Bibliography ==
- Harvey, G.E. (1925). History of Burma. London: Frank Cass & Co. Ltd.

Pyinsa Kalayani Pagan Dynasty
Royal titles
Preceded by	Queen Mother of Pagan c. 1084–c. 1100s	Succeeded by
Preceded by Myauk Pyinthe	Chief queen consort of Burma; 1044–1048	Succeeded by Agga Mahethi of Pagan
