= Four Paladins =

Elite knights of Anawrahta's court

Knights of Bagan
- Formation: early 11th century
- Headquarters: Bagan
- Supreme Commander: Kyansittha

The Four Paladins or Heroes (Burmese: သူရဲကောင်းလေးဦး) are the four legendary generals in the fellowship of King Anawrahta during the Bagan Dynasty. They are one of the most famous national heroes of Burma and played significant roles in the early tales of the Bagan Empire's expansion. In Burmese legends, each of them is said to be equivalent to the combined might of a legion.

== Members ==
1. Kyansittha (ကျန်စစ်သား) — Paragon of both physical and mental strength
2. Nga Htwe Yu (ငထွေရူး) — Paragon of agility
3. Nga Lon Letpe (ငလုံးလက်ဖယ်) — Paragon of might
4. Nyaung-U Hpi (ညောင်ဦးဖီး) — Paragon of stamina

== Mission to Pegu ==
The mission to Pegu is the most famous episode in the military career of the paladins. In the early 1070s, the king of Pegu made a distress call to Bagan when his kingdom is invaded by the Yuan-Khmer raiders called 'Joom' (ဂျွမ်း) from northern Thailand. King Anawrahta promised that he would send a relief cavalry of four legions to defend Lower Burma. The Peguan king waited hopefully for the mighty Bagan Imperial army, but disappointed with the arrival of only the Four Paladins and a few platoons. However, in front of all the people of Pegu, the warriors of Bagan easily repelled the invaders in just one day. They also took the four Joom generals( Aukbraran, Aukbrare, Aukbrabon, and Aukbrapike) captive, and presented them to the king of Pegu. The Peguan ruler, pleased by the legendary valor of the paladins, sent his young daughter Khin U, jewels and holy hair relics as tributes and gifts for Anawrahta.

However, unbeknownst to them, the return journey to Bagan would eventually lead to the dissolution of their friendships and the squad of the Paladins.
