= Zatadawbon Yazawin =

Earliest extant chronicle of Burma

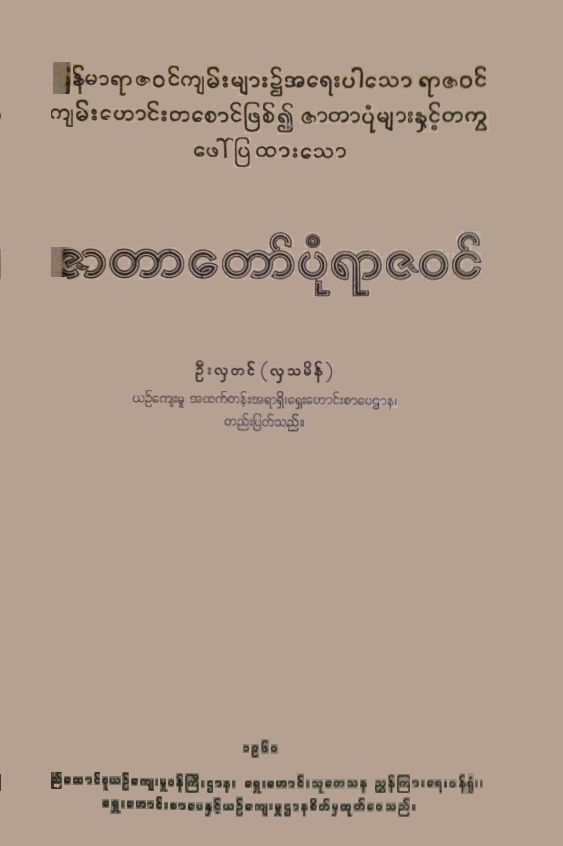
- Author: Court historians
- Original title: ဇာတာတော်ပုံ ရာဇဝင်
- Language: Burmese
- Series: Burmese chronicles
- Genre: Chronicle, History
- Publication date: 13th to 19th centuries

Zatadawbon Yazawin (Burmese: ဇာတာတော်ပုံ ရာဇဝင်, pronounced [zàdàdɔ̀bòʊɰ̃ jàzəwɪ̀ɰ̃]; also spelled Zatatawpon; lit. 'Chronicle of Royal Horoscopes') is the earliest extant chronicle of Burma. The chronicle mainly covers the regnal dates of kings as well as horoscopes of select kings from Pagan to Konbaung periods. In terms of regnal years, the chronicle is considered "the most accurate of all Burmese chronicles, particularly with regard to the best-known Pagan and Ava kings, many of whose dates have been corroborated by epigraphy."

== History ==
The chronicle was continuously updated and handed down by court historians from generation to generation. Given its inscriptionally verified regnal dates of 11th century Pagan kings, the list keeping of regnal dates probably had begun at least since the 11th century, if not earlier. The earliest portions of the chronicle appear to have written sometime in the late 13th century or the early 14th century. The original author is unknown but based on the internal text, he was a contemporary of Shin Ditha Pamauk, the diplomat and monk who led the Pagan delegation to the Mongol court in 1286–87. Furthermore, internal evidence indicates the original author first wrote the chronicle in the late Pagan or Myinsaing or Pinya periods (late 13th to early 14th centuries). The original author apparently had access to earlier records now lost to history, which he noted as yazawin mhat-chet akyin ("summary and notes of chronicles").

Over the following centuries, however, the original, simple chronicle of regnal lists came to be layered upon (and bookended) by religious history (and mythology). By King Minye Kyawhtin's reign (1673–98), much of the current form of the chronicle had come into existence, although later historians continued to update the regnal dates of following kings down to the last Burmese monarch Thibaw.

== Organization ==
Zatadawbon is only one of two extant Burmese chronicles (along with Yazawin Thit) to organize itself by dynasties and periods whereas all others had been organized strictly along with the linear order of kings. Its criterion for "periodization" is the rise and fall of dynasties, and its criterion for their labeling is the capital city. Thus the Tagaung, Sri Ksetra, Pagan, Pinya, Sagaing and Ava dynasties are named after the capital cities of the dynasties.

The chronicle consists of five general sections.

1. The beginning of the world system according to Buddhist mythology, its era, and the many dispensations of the Buddha
2. From the first king of the world Maha Sammata, Prince Siddhattha, who becomes the historical Buddha, to King Asoka's reign right before the beginning of Burmese history. History of Sri Lankan kings is also included. The first two sections came from the standard Theravada Buddhist texts such as the Mahavamsa, the Dipavamsa and the Buddhavamsa.
3. Legendary and historical origins of Burma (Myanmar), beginning with the Tagaung Kingdom, and the regnal lists of successive dynasties. The regnal list includes all the kings of Sri Ksetra, Pagan, Myinsaing, Pinya, Sagaing, Ava kingdoms, as well as Toungoo Dynasty, ending with King Narawara in 1671.
4. This section covers the horoscopes, like diagrams and numerals, of 36 select kings of Pagan, Sagaing, and Ava kingdoms. Some of the kings in the list of 36 are minor/less well-known kings such as Sokkate. Konbaung historians later added the horoscopes of Konbaung kings down to the last Burmese monarch Thibaw to the original list of 36. The section also includes the astrological calculations of the founding of major cities, palaces, exemplary temples and important events such as the first time the Mongols sent an embassy to Pagan (Bagan).
5. Section five has various statistical charts and data such as "the great Buddhist cities of Jambudipa", "the 16 great countries", "the 19 great capitals". It also includes a list of cities in Burma (probably in the Ava Kingdom (1364–1555)) that were required to supply fighting men and cavalrymen, lists of governors of major cities, the taxation levels of various regions, etc.

== Significance ==
In terms of regnal years, the chronicle is considered "the most accurate of all Burmese chronicles, particularly with regard to the best-known Pagan and Ava kings, many of whose dates have been corroborated by epigraphy." This can be seen in the following comparison of the regnal dates of the early Pagan kings (from Pyinbya, the fortifier of Pagan, according to the chronicles) as reported in the three chronicles. (Note that although Zata had been available to later chroniclers, including those of the two standard chronicles, Maha Yazawin (1724) and Hmannan Yazawin (1832), the later chroniclers did not follow Zata's dates. Maha Yazawin's dates are off by at least a decade for the most part, and Hmannan's are also similarly off until at the end of Sithu I's reign (1167) at which the chroniclers of Hmannan tried to synchronize with Zata's. The Myazedi inscription, inscribed in 1112 and rediscovered in 1887, has corroborated the accuracy of Zata and disproves the dates reported in Maha Yazawin and Hmannan for kings Anawrahta to Kyansittha.)

Name	Reign per Zatadawbon Yazawin	Reign per Maha Yazawin	Reign per Yazawin Thit	Reign per Hmannan Yazawin	Reign per scholarship
Pyinbya	846/47–876/77	846/47–858/59	846/47–878/79	846/47–878/79	
Tannet	876/77–904/05	858/59–876/77	878/79–906/07	878/79–906/07	
Sale Ngahkwe	904/05–934/35	876/77–901/02	906/07–915/16	906/07–915/16	
Theinhko	934/35–956/57	901/02–917/18	915/16–931/32	915/16–931/32	
Nyaung-u Sawrahan	956/57–1001/02	917/18–950/51	931/32–964/65	931/32–964/65	
Kunhsaw Kyaunghpyu	1001/02–1021/22	950/51–971/72	964/65–986/87	964/65–986/87	
Kyiso	1021/22–1038/39	971/72–977/78	986/87–992/93	986/87–992/93	
Sokkate	1038/39–1044/45	977/78–1002/03	992/93–1017/18	992/93–1017/18	
Anawrahta	1044–1077	1002–1035	1017–1059	1017–1059	1044–1077
Saw Lu	1077–1084	1035–1061	1059–1064	1059–1064	1077–1084
Kyansittha	1084–1111	1063–1088 (Note: (Maha Yazawin Vol. 1 184–185): Saw Lu died in 423 ME (1061–1062 CE), and his death was followed by two years interregnum. Kyansittha succeeded the throne only in 425 ME (1063–1064 CE).)	1064–1093	1064–1092	1084–1112/1113
Sithu I	1111–1167	1088–1158	1093–1168	1092–1167	1112/1113–1167
Narathu	1167–1170	1158–1161	1168–1171	1167–1171	1167–1170
Naratheinkha	1170–1173	1161–1164	1171–1174	1171–1174	1170–1174
Sithu II	1173–1210	1164–1197	1174–1211	1174–1211	1174–1211
Htilominlo	1210–1234	1197–1219	1211–1234	1211–1234	1211–1235
Kyaswa	1234–1249	1219–1234	1234–1250	1234–1250	1235–1249
Uzana	1249–1254	1234–1240	1250–1255	1250–1255	1249–1256
Narathihapate	1254–1287	1240–1284	1255–1286	1255–1286	1256–1287
Kyawswa; Vassal of Mongols (1297)	1287–1300	1286–1300 (Note: (Maha Yazawin Vol. 1 2006: 252): Kyawswa came to power after two years of interregnum.)	1286–1298	1286–1298	1289–1297
Saw Hnit; Vassal of Myingsaing/Pinya	1300–1331	1300–1322	1298–1330	1298–1325	?
Uzana II; Vassal of Pinya and Ava	1331–1368	1322–1365	1330–1368	1325–1368	?

== Bibliography ==
- Aung-Thwin, Michael A.; Maitrii Aung-Thwin (2012). A History of Myanmar Since Ancient Times (illustrated ed.). Honolulu: University of Hawai'i Press. ISBN 978-1-86189-901-9.
- Charney, Michael W. (2006). Powerful Learning: Buddhist Literati and the Throne in Burma's Last Dynasty, 1752–1885. Ann Arbor: University of Michigan.
- Htin Aung, Maung (1970). Burmese History before 1287: A Defence of the Chronicles. Oxford: The Asoka Society.
- Kala, U (1724). Maha Yazawin Gyi (in Burmese). Vol. 1–3 (2006, 4th printing ed.). Yangon: Ya-Pyei Publishing.
- Royal Historians of Burma (c. 1680). U Hla Tin (Hla Thamein) (ed.). Zatadawbon Yazawin (1960 ed.). Historical Research Directorate of the Union of Burma.
