= Nyaung-u Sawrahan =

Nyaung-u Sawrahan ညောင်ဦး စောရဟန်း

King of Pagan
- Reign: c. 956 – 1001
- Predecessor: Theinhko
- Successor: Kunhsaw Kyaunghpyu
- Born: 924 (Wednesday born); Nyaung-U
- Died: 1001; Pagan
- Consort: Taung Pyinthe; Ale Pyinthe; Myauk Pyinthe
- Issue: Kyiso; Sokkate
- House: Pagan
- Religion: Theravada Buddhism

Nyaung-u Sawrahan (Burmese: ညောင်ဦး စောရဟန်း, pronounced [ɲàʊɰ̃ ʔú sɔ́jəháɰ̃]; also Taungthugyi Min c. 924–1001) was king of the Pagan dynasty of Burma (Myanmar) from c. 956 to 1001. Although he is remembered as the Cucumber King in the Burmese chronicles based on a legend, Sawrahan is the earliest king of Pagan whose existence has been verified by inscriptional evidence. According to scholarship, it was during Sawrahan's reign that Pagan, then one of several competing city-states in Upper Burma, "grew in authority and grandeur". The creation of Burmese alphabet as well as the fortification of Pagan may have begun in his reign. (Note: (Aung-Thwin 2005: 38): The earliest radiocarbon date of the Pagan walls (c. 980 CE) points to his reign although the more probable date is c. 1020 CE. (Aung-Thwin 2005: 167–178, 197–200): The earliest evidence of Burmese script (984 CE) points to his reign if a recast 18th century copy of an original stone inscription is permissible as evidence. The earliest evidence of original Burmese script (the copper-gilt umbrella inscription of the Mahabodhi Temple) is dated to 1035.)

== Chronicle tradition ==
Despite the historical importance, the king's reign is recorded in the chronicles with what has been identified as a legend by scholarship. According to the legend, Sawrahan usurped the throne from King Theinhko. Once a farmer, Nyaung-u killed Theinhko when he stole a cucumber from his field. Nyaung-u Sawrahan was accepted as king by the queen to prevent unrest in the kingdom and became known as Taungthugyi Min (Cucumber King or Farmer King; တောင်သူကြီးမင်း). The story is likely a fairy tale. There are at least three other versions—an exact parallel in the Burmese fairy tale "Princess Thudhammasari" and two variants in Cambodian history, one in the eighth and another in the 14th century. King Norodom Sihanouk used to claim descent from the gardener to show proximity to his people.

Nyaung-u Sawrahan was overthrown by Kunhsaw Kyaunghpyu, who in turn was overthrown by Nyaung-u's sons Kyiso and Sokkate.

== Dates ==
Various chronicles do not agree on the dates regarding his life and reign. The oldest chronicle Zatadawbon Yazawin is considered to be the most accurate for the Pagan period. (Note: (Maha Yazawin 2006: 346–349): Among the four major chronicles, only Zatadawbon Yazawin's dates line up with Anawrahta's inscriptionally verified accession date of 1044 CE. (Aung-Thwin 2005: 121–123): In general, Zata is considered "the most accurate of all Burmese chronicles, particularly with regard to the best-known Pagan and Ava kings, many of whose dates have been corroborated by epigraphy.") The table below lists the dates given by four main chronicles, as well as Hmannan's dates when anchored by the Anawrahta's inscriptionally verified accession date of 1044.

Chronicles	Birth–Death	Age	Reign	Length of reign
Zatadawbon Yazawin	924–1001	77	956–1001	45
Maha Yazawin	873–950	77	917–950	33
Yazawin Thit and Hmannan Yazawin	887–964	77	931–964	33
Hmannan adjusted	915–992	77	959–992	33

== Bibliography ==
- Aung-Thwin, Michael (1985). Pagan: The Origins of Modern Burma. Honolulu: University of Hawai'i Press. ISBN 0-8248-0960-2.
- Aung-Thwin, Michael A. (2005). The Mists of Rāmañña: The Legend that was Lower Burma (illustrated ed.). Honolulu: University of Hawai'i Press. ISBN 9780824828868.
- Harvey, G. E. (1925). History of Burma: From the Earliest Times to 10 March 1824. London: Frank Cass & Co. Ltd.
- Kala, U (1724). Maha Yazawin (in Burmese). Vol. 1–3 (2006, 4th printing ed.). Yangon: Ya-Pyei Publishing.
- Lieberman, Victor B. (2003). Strange Parallels: Southeast Asia in Global Context, c. 800–1830, volume 1, Integration on the Mainland. Cambridge University Press. ISBN 978-0-521-80496-7.
- Royal Historical Commission of Burma (1832). Hmannan Yazawin (in Burmese). Vol. 1–3 (2003 ed.). Yangon: Ministry of Information, Myanmar.

Nyaung-u Sawrahan Pagan Dynasty Born: c. 924 Died: c. 1001
Regnal titles
Preceded by Theinhko	King of Pagan c. 956–1001	Succeeded by Kunhsaw Kyaunghpyu
