= Nga Htwe Yu =

Paladin during the Bagan dynasty

- ငထွေရူး
- Born: Myinmu, Kingdom of Bagan
- Military career
- Allegiance: Bagan Dynasty
- Branch: Royal Burmese Army
- Service years: 1050s–1060s
- Conflicts: Founding Campaigns of Pagan Empire

Gen. Nga Htwe Yu (Burmese: ငထွေရူး, pronounced [ŋə tʰwè jú]) was one of the Four Paladins of King Anawrahta during the Bagan dynasty in modern-day Myanmar. He was formerly a palm tree climber from Myinmu and said to be capable of dealing with a thousand palm trees in one morning. He was later knighted by Anawrahta and served as a leading general of the Royal Army.
