= Nga Lon Letpe =

Nga Lon Letpe ငလုံးလက်ဖယ်
- Born: Mount Popa, Pagan Kingdom
- Military career
- Allegiance: Pagan Dynasty
- Branch: Royal Burmese Army
- Service years: 1050s–1060s
- Conflicts: Founding of Pagan Empire

Gen. Nga Lon Letpe (Burmese: ငလုံးလက်ဖယ်, pronounced [ŋə lóʊɴ lə pʰɛ̀]; Ngaloun Lekphay) was one of the Four Paladins of King Anawrahta during the Pagan Dynasty. He was formerly a simple farmer from Popa region, and could plough a large-scale farm by driving 60 oxen single-handedly in one morning. He was later knighted by Anawrahta and served as a leading general of the Royal Army.

He, along with his iconic horse "Le-mo-thae-khaung" (Burmese: လေမိုးသည်းခေါင်) is remembered as the epitome of physical might and farming in popular culture today.
