= Khelu =

Pagan Dynasty king

Khelu ခဲလူး

King of Pagan
- Reign: 829-846
- Predecessor: Saw Khin Hnit
- Successor: Pyinbya
- Born: c. 794
- Died: 846 (aged 52); Pagan
- House: Pagan
- Father: Saw Khin Hnit
- Religion: Theravada Buddhism

Khelu (Burmese: ခဲလူး; c. 794–846) was the 32nd king of Pagan Dynasty of Burma and the last king of Tampavati period of Bagan. He was the eldest son of Saw Khin Hnit and older brother of Pyinbya. He reigned over Bagan for 17 years. After his death, he was succeeded by his brother, Pyinbya.

Khelu Pagan Dynasty Born: c. 794 Died: c. 846
Regnal titles
Preceded by Saw Khin Hnit	King of Pagan; 829-846	Succeeded by Pyinbya
