= Anawrahta =

Emperor of the Bagan Dynasty, Myanmar

Anawrahta; အနော်ရထာ
- King of Pagan
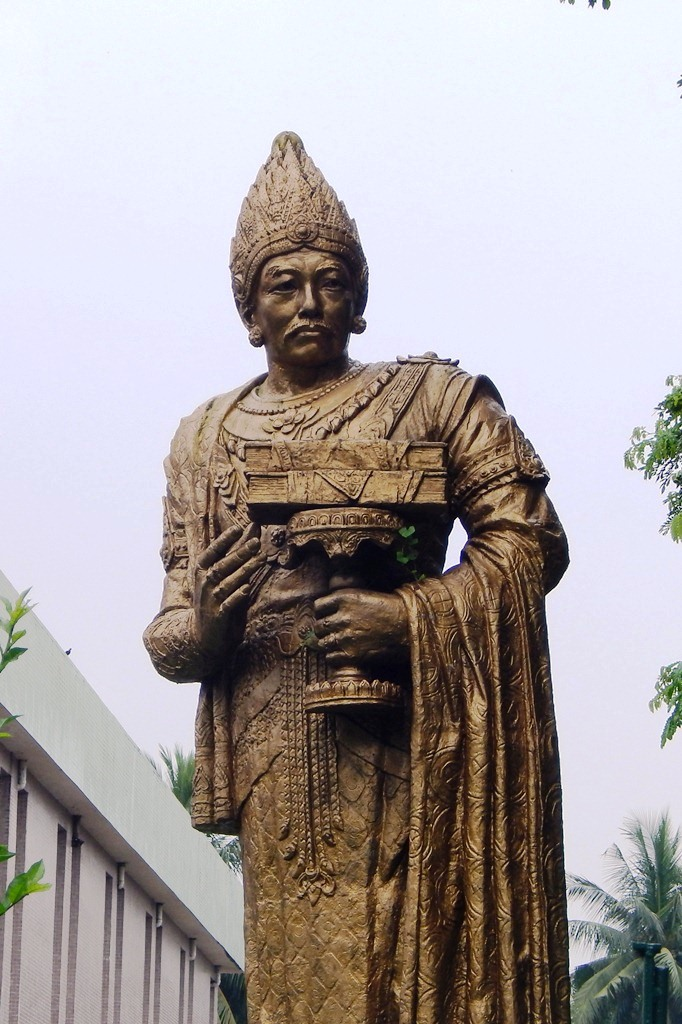
- Statue of Anawrahta

King of Burma
- Reign: 11 August 1044 – 11 April 1077
- Coronation: 16 December 1044
- Predecessor: Sokkate
- Successor: Saw Lu
- Born: 11 May 1014; Tuesday, 11th waxing of Nayon 376 ME; Pagan (Bagan)
- Died: 11 April 1077 (aged 62); Tuesday, 3rd waning of Kason 439 ME; Pagan
- Consort: Pyinsa Kalayani; Agga Mahethi; Saw Mon Hla; Manisanda
- Issue: Kyansittha; Saw Lu
Names
- Min Saw; Mahārājā Sīri Aniruddha Deva
- House: Pagan
- Father: Kunhsaw Kyaunghpyu
- Mother: Myauk Pyinthe
- Religion: Theravada Buddhism converted from Ari Buddhism

Anawrahta Minsaw (Burmese: အနော်ရထာ မင်းစော, pronounced [ʔənɔ̀jətʰà mɪ́ɰ̃ sɔ́]; 11 May 1014 – 11 April 1077) was the founder of the Pagan Empire. Considered the father of the Burmese nation, Anawrahta turned a small principality in the dry zone of Upper Burma into the first Burmese Empire that formed the basis of modern-day Burma (Myanmar). Historically verifiable Burmese history begins with his accession to the Pagan throne in 1044.

Anawrahta unified the entire Irrawaddy valley for the first time in history, and placed peripheral regions such as the Shan States and Arakan (Rakhine) under Pagan's suzerainty. He successfully stopped the advance of the Khmer Empire into the Tenasserim coastline and into the Upper Menam valley, making Pagan one of the two great kingdoms in mainland Southeast Asia.

A strict disciplinarian, Anawrahta implemented a series of key social, religious and economic reforms that would have a lasting impact in Burmese history. His social and religious reforms later developed into the modern-day Burmese culture. By building a series of weirs, he turned parched, arid regions around Pagan into the main rice granaries of Upper Burma, giving Upper Burma an enduring economic base from which to dominate the Irrawaddy valley and its periphery in the following centuries. He bequeathed a strong administrative system that all later Pagan kings followed until the dynasty's fall in 1287. The success and longevity of Pagan's dominance over the Irrawaddy valley laid the foundation for the ascent of Burmese language and culture, the spread of Burman ethnicity in Upper Burma.

Anawrahta's legacy went far beyond the borders of modern Burma. His embrace of Theravada Buddhism and his success in stopping the advance of Khmer Empire, a Mahayana state, provided the Buddhist school, which had been in retreat elsewhere in South and Southeast Asia, a much needed reprieve and a safe shelter. The success of Pagan dynasty made Theravada Buddhism's later growth in Lan Na (northern Thailand), Siam (central Thailand), Lan Xang (Laos), and Khmer Empire (Cambodia) in the 13th and 14th centuries possible.

Anawrahta is one of the most famous kings in Burmese history. His life stories (legends) are a staple of Burmese folklore and retold in popular literature and theater.

== Early life ==
Prior to Anawrahta, of all the early Pagan kings, only Nyaung-u Sawrahan's reign can be verified independently by stone inscriptions. Anawrahta is the first historical king in that the events during his reign can be verified by stone inscriptions. However, Anawrahta's youth, like much of early Pagan history, is still shrouded in legend, and should be treated as such.

Anawrahta was born Min Saw (မင်းစော, IPA: [mɪ́ɰ̃ sɔ́]) to King Kunhsaw Kyaunghpyu and Queen Myauk Pyinthe on 11 May 1044. (Note: (Yazawin Thit 2012: 95, footnote #2) which cites (Bo Lay 1990: 25–28) states that Anawrahta was born on 11 May 1014.) The Burmese chronicles do not agree on the dates regarding his life and reign. The table below lists the dates given by the four main chronicles. Among the chronicles, scholarship usually accepts Zata's dates, which are considered to be the most accurate for the Pagan period. (Note: (Maha Yazawin 2006: 346–349): Among the four major chronicles, only Zatadawbon Yazawin's dates line up with Anawrahta's inscriptionally verified accession date of 1044 CE. (Aung-Thwin 2005: 121–123): In general, Zata is considered "the most accurate of all Burmese chronicles, particularly with regard to the best-known Pagan and Ava kings, many of whose dates have been corroborated by epigraphy.") Scholarship's dates for Anawrahta's birth, death and reign dates are closest to Zata's dates.

Chronicles	Birth–Death	Age	Reign	Length of reign
Zatadawbon Yazawin	1014/15–1077/78 (Note: The Burmese calendar straddles the Western calendar year. In Anawrahta's time, each Burmese year began and ended in late March of the Julian calendar. For example, the Burmese year 376 spanned from 25 March 1014 to 25 March 1015. Scholarship usually simplifies by reporting just the leading year, e.g., 376 ME as 1014.)	62	1044/45–1077/78	33
Maha Yazawin	970/71–1035/36	65	1002/03–1035/36	33
Yazawin Thit and Hmannan Yazawin	985/86–March 1060	74	13 January 1018 – March 1060 (Note: (Hmannan Vol. 1 2003: 230) on Monday, 8th waning of Pyatho, 379 ME (13 January 1018). (Hmannan Vol. 1 2003: 274) says Anawrahta died in 421 ME (1059–1060 CE) right before the Burmese new year (March 1060).)	42
Scholarship	11 May 1014 – 11 April 1077	62	11 August 1044 – 11 April 1077	32

In 1021, when Min Saw was about six years old, his father was deposed by his step-sons Kyiso and Sokkate. (Note: (Maha Yazawin Vol. 1 2006: 347): The overthrow of Kunhsaw took place in 1021 per Zata, 971 per Maha Yazawin and 986 per Hmannan and Yazawin Thit.) His father had been a usurper of the Pagan throne, who overthrew King Nyaung-u Sawrahan two decades earlier. (Note: (Maha Yazawin Vol. 1 2006: 347): The overthrow of Nyaung-u Sawrahan took place in 1001 per Zata, 950 per Maha Yazawin and 964 per Hmannan and Yazawin Thit.) Kunhsaw then married three of Nyaung-u's chief queens, two of whom were pregnant at the time, and subsequently gave birth to Kyiso and Sokkate. Kunhsaw had raised Sokkate and Kyiso as his own sons. After the putsch, Kyiso became king and Sokkate became heir-apparent. They forced their step-father to a local monastery, where Kunhsaw would live as a monk for the remainder of his life.

Min Saw grew up in the shadow of his two step-brothers, who viewed Min Saw as their youngest brother and allowed him to retain his princely status at the court. Min Saw and his mother attended Kunhsaw, and lived nearby the monastery. In 1038, Kyiso died, and was succeeded by Sokkate. (Note: (Maha Yazawin Vol. 1 2006: 347): Kyiso died in 1038 per Zata, 977 per Maha Yazawin and 992 per Hmannan and Yazawin Thit.) Min Saw was loyal to the new king. He took a wife, Pyinsa Kalayani, and had at least one son, Kyansittha, by the early 1030s.

== Accession ==
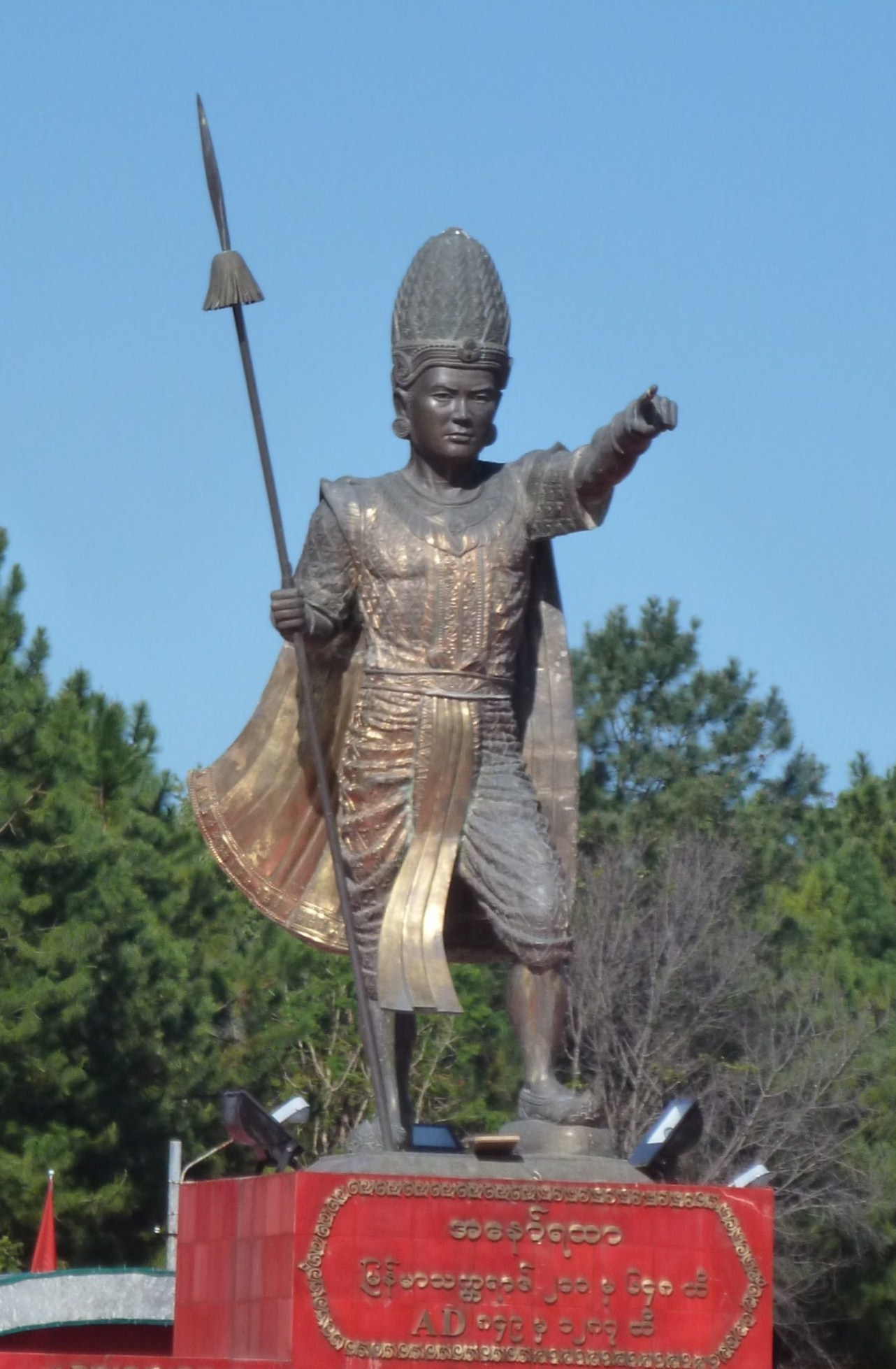
Statue of Anawrahta in front of the DSA

In 1044 however, Min Saw raised a rebellion at nearby Mount Popa, and challenged Sokkate to single combat. According to the chronicles, the reason for his uprising was that Sokkate had just raised Min Saw's mother as queen. Sokkate is said to have addressed Min Saw as brother-son, which the latter took great offense. Sokkate accepted the challenge to single combat on horseback. On 11 August 1044, Min Saw slew Sokkate at Myinkaba, near Pagan. (Note: Per Zata's horoscope section (Zata 1960: 83) as translated by the editors of (Yazawin Thit 2012: 95, footnote #1).) The king and his horse both fell into the river nearby.

Min Saw first offered the throne to his father. The former king, who had long been a monk, refused. On 16 December 1044, Min Saw ascended the throne with the title of Anawrahta, a Burmanized form of Sanskrit name Aniruddha (अनिरुद्ध). (Note: (Hmannan Vol. 1 2003: 230) says he came to power on Monday, 8th waning of Pyatho, 379 ME (13 January 1018). But the Myazedi inscription and Zatadawbon Yazawin both say Anawrahta came to power in 406 ME (1044/1045 CE). Assuming that 8th waning of Pyatho is correct, he ascended the throne on 16 December 1044 (8th waning of Pyatho 406 ME).) His full royal style was Maha Yaza Thiri Aniruddha Dewa (မဟာ ရာဇာ သီရိ အနိရုဒ္ဓ ဒေဝ; Sanskrit: Mahā Rājā Śrī Aniruddha Devá). Burmese history now begins to be less conjectural.

== Early reign: Consolidation of Central Burma ==
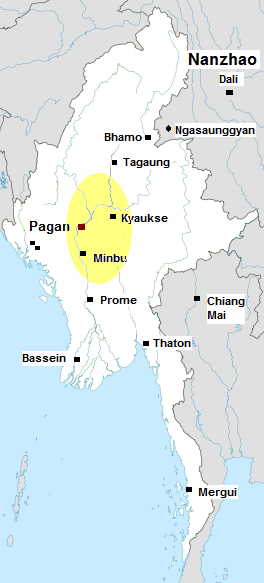
Principality of Pagan at Anawrahta's accession in 1044

In the beginning, Anawrahta's principality was a small area—barely 200 miles north to south and about 80 miles from east to west, comprising roughly the present districts of Mandalay, Meiktila, Myingyan, Kyaukse, Yamethin, Magwe, Sagaing and Katha east of the Irrawaddy, and the riverine portions of Minbu and Pakkoku. To the north lay Nanzhao Kingdom, and to the east still largely uninhibited Shan Hills, to the south and the west the Pyus, and farther south still, the Mons.

=== Economic reforms ===
Anawrahta's first acts as king were to organize his kingdom. He graded every town and village according to the levy it could raise. He made great efforts to turn the arid parched lands of central Burma into a rice granary. He constructed the irrigation system, which is still used in Upper Burma today. He repaired the Meiktila Lake, and successfully built four weirs and canals (Kinda, Nga Laingzin, Pyaungbya, Kume) on the Panlaung river, and three weirs (Nwadet, Kunhse, Nga Pyaung) on the Zawgyi. (He also tried to control the Myitnge river but failed despite all his efforts. The work lasted three years and there were many casualties from fever.) He peopled the newly developed areas with villages, which under royal officers served the canals. The region, known as Ledwin (lit. the rice country) became the granary, the economic key of the north country. History shows that one who gained control of Kyaukse became kingmaker in Upper Burma.

=== Military organization ===
Anawrahta organized Pagan's military. His key men—known as the Four Great Paladins in Burmese history—were:

- Kyansittha, his son and lead general
- Nyaung-U Hpi, known as the great swimmer from Nyaung-U
- Nga Htwe Yu, former toddy tree climber from Myinmu (near Sagaing)
- Nga Lon Letpe, former farmer from near Mount Popa

Also at his service were Byatta (ဗျတ္တ), a Muslim (likely an Arab seaman) shipwrecked at Thaton, and his sons Shwe Hpyin Gyi and Shwe Hpyin Nge, (who later entered the pantheon of Burmese folk deities as Shwe Hpyin Brothers ရွှေဖျဉ်းညီနောင်).

== Founding of Pagan Empire ==
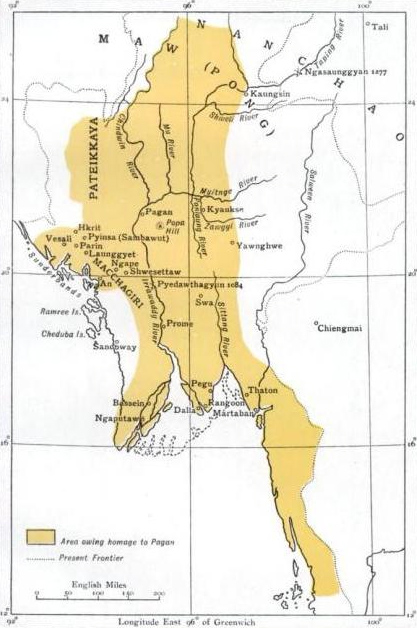
Pagan Empire, estimated by GE Harvey

By the mid-1050s, Anawrahta's reforms had turned Pagan into a regional power, and he looked to expand. Over the next ten years, he founded the Pagan Empire, the Irrawaddy valley at the core, surrounded by tributary kingdoms.

Estimates of the extent of his empire vary greatly. The Burmese and Thai chronicles report an empire which covered present-day Myanmar and northern Thailand. The Thai chronicles assert that Anawrahta conquered the entire Menam valley, and received tribute from the Khmer king. One states that Anawrahta's armies invaded the Khmer kingdom and sacked the city of Angkor, and another one goes so far as to say that Anawrahta even visited Java to receive his tribute. However, Western historians (Harvey, Hall, et al) present a much smaller empire, consisted of the Irrawaddy valley and nearer periphery. His victory terracotta votive tablets (emblazoned with his name in Sanskrit) have been found along the Tenasserim coastline in the south, Katha in the north, Thazi in the east and Minbu in the west.

=== Shan Hills ===
His first efforts were in then lightly inhabited Shan Hills in the east and the north. He acquired allegiance of Shan Hills in two waves. In the early to mid-1050s, Anawrahta first visited the nearer Shan Hills in the east, and received tribute. He founded the Bawrithat Pagoda in Nyaungshwe. The second wave came in the late 1050s and early 1060s after his march to Dali Kingdom (Successor to Nanzhao). After his return from Nanzhao expedition, Shan chiefs along the route presented Anawrahta with tributes. Still, their allegiance was nominal and he had to establish 43 forts along the eastern foothills of which the following 33 still exist as villages.

Bhamo	Katha	Kyaukse	Meiktila	Mogok	Mandalay	Toungoo	Yamethin
Kaungton; Kaungsin; Shwegu	Yinkhe; Moda; Katha; Htigyaing	Mekkhaya; Ta On; Myinsaing; Myittha	Hlaingdet; Thagaya; Nyaungyan	Myadaung; Tagaung; Hinthamaw; Kyanhnyat; Sampanago	Singu; Konthaya; Magwe Taya; Yenantha; Sonmyo; Madaya; Thakegyin; Wayindok; Taungbyon; Myodin	Myohla; Kelin; Swa	Shwemyo

The 43 forts were established per the royal order issued 7 February 1061 (12th waxing of Tabaung 422 ME).

=== Lower Burma ===
After his first Shan campaign, Anawrahta turned to the Mon-speaking kingdoms in the south, which like Pagan were merely large city-states in reality. He first received submission of the ruler of Pegu (Bago). But the Thaton Kingdom refused to submit. Anawrahta's armies, led by the "Four Paladins", invaded the southern kingdom in early 1057. After a 3-months' siege of the city of Thaton, on 17 May 1057, (11th waxing of Nayon, 419 ME), the Pagan forces conquered the city.

According to Burmese and Mon traditions, Anawrahta's main reason for the invasion was Thaton king Manuha's refusal to give him a copy of the Theravada Buddhist Canon. (Anawrahta had been converted to Theravada Buddhism from his native Ari Buddhism by Shin Arahan, a monk originally from Thaton.) In reality, it was merely a demand for submission couched in diplomatic language, and the real aim of his conquest of Thaton was to check the Khmer Empire's conquests in the Chao Phraya basin and encroachment into the Tenasserim coast.

The conquest of Thaton is seen as the turning point in Burmese history. Still according to traditional reconstruction, Anawrahta brought back over 30,000 people, many of them artisans and craftsmen to Pagan. These captives formed a community that later helped build thousands of monuments at Pagan, the remains of which today rival the splendors of Angkor Wat.

More recent research by historian Michael Aung-Thwin has argued forcefully that Thaton's contributions to the cultural transformation of Upper Burma are a post-Pagan legend without contemporary evidence, that Lower Burma in fact lacked a substantial independent polity prior to Pagan's expansion, and that Mon influence on the interior is greatly exaggerated. Possibly in this period, the delta sedimentation—which now extends the coastline by three miles a century—remained insufficient, and the sea still reached too far inland, to support a population even as large as the modest population of the late precolonial era.

At any rate, during the 11th century, Pagan established its Lower Burma and this conquest facilitated growing cultural exchange, if not with local Mons, then with India and with Theravada stronghold Ceylon (Sri Lanka).

=== Arakan ===
Anawrahta's next conquest was north Arakan (Rakhine). He marched over the pass from Ngape near Minbu to An in Kyaukphyu, and then laid siege to Pyinsa, then the capital of Arakan. He reportedly tried to bring home the giant Mahamuni Buddha but could not. He did take away the gold and silver vessels of the shrine.

There is no single unified Arakanese account to corroborate the event. Surviving Arakanese chronicles (from the 18th and 19th centuries) mention at least two separate raids from the east, as well as "visits" by Anawrahta and Kyansittha. According to the Arakanese accounts, the attacks from the east ousted kings Pe Byu and Nga Ton in succession. However, the dates are off by centuries with the ousted kings having reigned in the late 8th to early 9th centuries, 10th to 11th, or 11th to 12th centuries. (Note: (Sandamala Linkara 1931: 148–151): King Pe Byu was ousted by the "king of Pyus" in 976 CE per Saya Mi's Razawin, 1076 per Razawin Haung, or 776 per Razawin Thit. Razawin Linka also mentions the raid. Rakhine Razawin Thit, the last Arakanese chronicle written in 1931, rejects the Anawrahta's "visit", and says the raid that ousted Pe Byu took place in 776 CE, three centuries before Anawrahta. The second raid occurred in 828, 1018 or 1103, either overthrowing King Nga Ton or installing King Letya Minnan.)

At any rate, as was the case with the Shan Hills, Anawrahta's suzerainty over north Arakan (separated by the Arakan Yoma range) was nominal. The "conquest" may have been more of a raid to prevent Arakanese raids into Burma, and some historians (Lieberman, Charney) do not believe he (or any other Pagan kings) had any "effective authority" over Arakan. If Pagan never established an administrative system to govern Arakan, it continued to foster a vassal relationship for the remainder of Pagan dynasty, occasionally placing its nominees to the Arakanese throne. Moreover, the Burmese language and script came to dominate the Arakan littoral over the next centuries. With Burmese influence came ties to Ceylon (Sri Lanka) and the gradual prominence of Theravada Buddhism.

=== Pateikkaya ===
Anawrahta also received tribute from the Buddhist kingdom of Pateikkaya (ပဋိက္ခယား, IPA: [bədeiʔ kʰəjá]). The location of the small kingdom remains in dispute. The Burmese chronicles report the location as northwest of Arakan and its kings Indian. But British historian GE Harvey reckoned that it was more likely nearer to the eastern Chin Hills. The Tripura State was described as "Patikara" in Maharajoang, an ancient historical book of Bramhadesh. The predecessor of the Twipra Kingdom was a dynasty who called their kingdom Paṭṭikera. Coins of the older Chandra dynasty show the name which signifies a shift in power in modern-day Comilla to the new Devas of Harikāla.

== External relations ==
As his kingdom expanded, Anawrahta came into contact with the Dali Kingdom (the erstwhile home of the Burmans) in the northeast, and in the southeast, the Khmer Empire, the main power of mainland Southeast Asia at the time. He assisted fellow Theravada Buddhist Ceylon in its war against Hindu Chola invaders.

=== Khmer Empire ===
Pagan's conquest of Thaton shook the Mon world. Anawrahta also demanded tribute from other neighboring Mon Kingdoms, Haripunjaya and Dvaravati (in present-day northern and central Thailand). Haripunjaya reportedly sent in tribute but Dvaravati's overlord Khmer Empire instead invaded Tenasserim. Anawrahta sent his armies, again led by the four paladins, who repulsed the invaders. The Burmese chronicles referred to the Kingdom of Cambodia as the southeastern limit of the Pagan Empire.

=== Dali Kingdom ===
After the Khmer advance was checked, Anawrahta turned his attention toward Dali. Anawrahta led a campaign against the kingdom in the northeast. (According to a mid-17th century source, he began the march on 16 December 1057.) (Note: (Maha Yazawin Vol. 1 2006: 166 footnote #2): The date was given by the monk Taunghpila Sayadaw as part of his answers to a set questions posed by King Pindale (r. 1648–1661).) He advanced to Dali, the capital of Dali Kingdom, ostensibly to seek a Buddha's tooth relic. As in the case of the request for the scriptures from Thaton, it was really a demand for tribute. The ruler of Dali shut the gates, and would not give up the relic. After a long pause, two kings exchanged presents and conversed amicably. The Dali ruler gave Anawrahta a jade image which had come into contact with the tooth.

=== Ceylon ===
In 1069, Vijayabahu I of Ceylon asked Anawrahta for aid against the Chola invaders from Tamil country. Anawrahta sent ships of supplies in aid of Buddhist Ceylon. In 1071, Vijayabahu who had defeated the Cholas asked Anawrahta for Buddhist scriptures and Buddhist monks. The Chola invasions had left the original home of Theravada Buddhism with so few monks that it was hard to convene a chapter and make valid ordinations. Anawrahta sent the monks and scriptures, and a white elephant as a present for Vijayabahu. The Burmese monks ordained or re-ordained the entire clergy of the island. In return, the Ceylonese king gave a replica of the Buddha Tooth of which Ceylon was the proud possessor. The replica was then enshrined in the Lawkananda Pagoda in Pagan.

== Administration ==
=== Nation-building ===
The greatest achievement of Anawrahta was his consolidation of various ethnic groups into a single nation. He was careful that his own people, the Burmans, not flaunt themselves before other peoples. He continued to show regard for the Pyus, who had recently fallen from greatness. He retained the name Pyu for his kingdom although it was under the leadership of the Burmans. He showed regard for the Mons, and encouraged his people to learn from the Mons.

Anawrahta replaced the kings of Lower Burma (Pegu and Thaton) with governors. At Pegu, he allowed the king of Pegu to remain as a vassal king in appreciation of the latter's help in Anawrahta's conquest of Thaton. But after the vassal king's death, he appointed a governor. Due to geographical distances, other tributary areas such as Arakan and Shan Hills were allowed to retain hereditary chieftainships.

=== Religious reforms ===
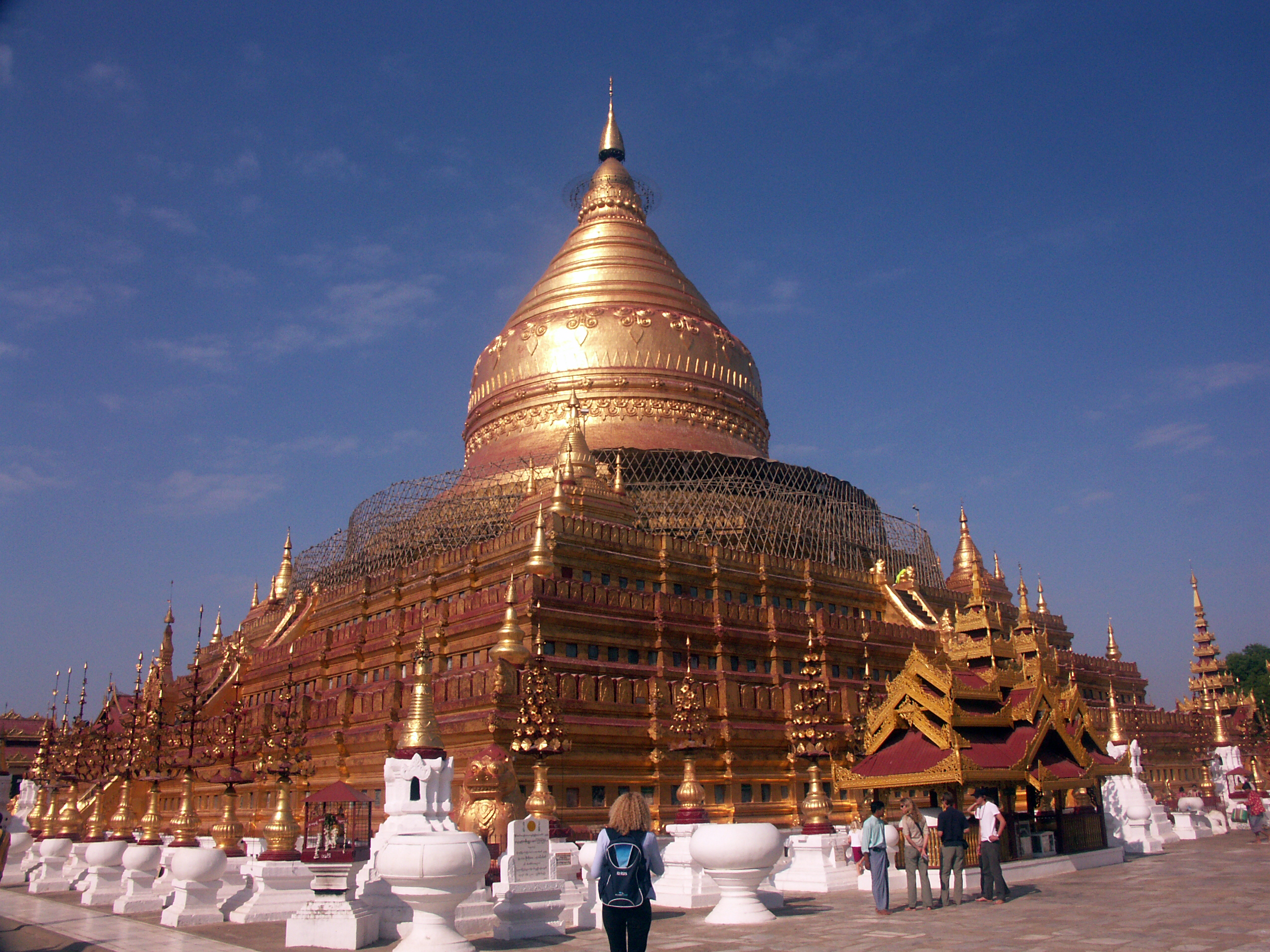
Shwezigon Pagoda in Nyaung-U

In 1056, a Mon Theravada Buddhist monk named Shin Arahan made a fateful visit to Pagan, and converted its king Anawrahta to Theravada Buddhism from his native Ari Buddhism. The king had been dissatisfied with the enormous power of Ari monks over the people, and considered the monks, who ate evening meals, drank liquor, presided over animal sacrifices, and enjoyed a form of ius primae noctis, depraved. In Theravada Buddhism he found a substitute to break the power of the clergy.

From 1056 onwards, Anawrahta implemented a series of religious reforms throughout his kingdom. His reforms gained steam after his conquest of Thaton, which brought much needed scriptures and clergy from the vanquished kingdom. He broke the power of the Ari monks first by declaring that his court would no longer heed if people ceased to yield their children to the priests. Those who were in bondage of the priests gained freedom. Some of the monks simply disrobed or followed the new way. However, the majority of the monks who had wielded power for so long would not go away easily.

Anawrahta banished them in numbers; many of them fled to Popa Hill and the Shan Hills. He used traditional nat spirits to attract people to his new religion. Asked why he allowed the nats to be placed in Buddhist temples and pagodas, Anawrahta answered "Men will not come for the sake of new faith. Let them come for their old gods, and gradually they will be won over."

Urged on by Shin Arahan, Anawrahta tried to reform the very Theravada Buddhism he received from Thaton, which by most accounts, was in a state of decay, and increasingly influenced by Hinduism. (The Mon chronicles hint that Manuha was reprehensible for making a compromise with Hinduism. Shin Arahan left Thaton because he was unhappy with the decaying of Buddhism there.) He made Pagan a center of Theravada learning by inviting scholars from the Mon lands, Ceylon as well as from India where a dying Buddhism was being given a coup de grace by Hindu Forces. The scholarship helped revitalize a more orthodox form of Theravada Buddhism.

To be sure, his reforms could not and did not achieve everything overnight. The spread of Theravada Buddhism in Upper Burma was gradual; it took over three centuries. Its monastic system did not achieve widespread village level penetration in more remote areas until as late as the 19th century. Nor did the Aris die out. Their descendants, known as forest dwelling monks, remained a powerful force patronized by the royalty down to the Ava period in the 16th century. Likewise, the nat worship continued (down to the present day). Even the Theravada Buddhism of Anawrahta, Kyansittha and Manuha was one still strongly influenced by Hinduism when compared to later more orthodox (18th and 19th century) standards. Tantric, Saivite, and Vaishnava elements enjoyed greater elite influence than they would later do, reflecting both the relative immaturity of early Burmese literacy culture and its indiscriminate receptivity to non-Burman traditions. Indeed, even today's Burmese Buddhism contains many animist, Mahayana Buddhist and Hindu elements.

He was the first of the "Temple Builders" of Pagan. His chief monument was the Shwezigon Pagoda. The work began in 1059 but was still unfinished at his death 18 years later. He also built the Shwesandaw Pagoda south of Pagan to house the hair relics presented by Pegu. Farther afield, he built other pagodas such as Shweyinhmyaw, Shwegu and Shwezigon near Meiktila.

=== Invention of Burmese alphabet ===
Scholarship believed until recently that Anawrahta commissioned the invention of the Burmese alphabet based on the Mon script, c. 1058, a year after the Thaton conquest. However, recent research finds that the Burmese alphabet had been in use at least since 1035, and if an 18th-century recast inscription is permissible as evidence, since 984 CE.

=== Governing style ===
Anawrahta implemented significant political, socioeconomic and cultural changes. According to historian Htin Aung, his subjects admired and feared him but did not love him.[36]

Historian Htin Aung writes:

Anawrahta was ruthless and stern not to any particular ethnic group but to all his subjects, for he felt that harsh measures were needed in building up a new nation. He never accepted the cult of the god-king, and he was impatient even with gods that his people worshipped; men came to say that he beat up gods with the flat of his lance. He achieved his aims but only at the price of his own popularity. His subjects admired and feared him, but did not love him. His execution of two young heroes for a trifling breach of discipline after the conclusion of his Nanzhao campaign angered people, and to appease them he declared that the two dead heroes were now gods who could be worshipped. His forcing of Kyansittha to become fugitive increased his popularity although this action at least was justified for the great paladin, like the Lancelot of the Round Table, was in love with one of his queens.

(The queen in love with Kyansittha was Manisanda Khin U. The two young heroes executed were Shwe Hpyin Gyi and Shwe Hpyin Nge, who later entered the pantheon of Burmese nat spirits).

== Death ==
Anawrahta died on 11 April 1077 in the outskirts of Pagan. (Note: According to Dr. Bo Lay per (Bo Lay 1990: 24–28) as cited in (Yazawin Thit 2012: 108, footnote #1). Chronicles say he died right before the Burmese new year, which means March 1078. According to Maha Yazawin (Maha Yazawin Vol. 1 2006: 180) and Hmannan (Hmannan Vol. 1 2003: 274), he died right before the Burmese new year's day, on the day of a particular astrological event called "Dein-Net" that occurs five to six times a year. In the footnotes of (Maha Yazawin Vol. 1 2006: 180), the editors note that the Dein-Net event occurred on the Thingyan Akya day that year. Since the Burmese New Year's Day fell on 26 March 1078 per (Eade 1989: 81), he died on 23 March 1078.) The chronicles hint that his enemies ambushed and killed him and then disposed of the body in such a way that it was never found. The chronicles state that a nat (spirit) appeared in the guise of wild buffalo and gored him to death, and then demons took away his body.

== Legacy ==
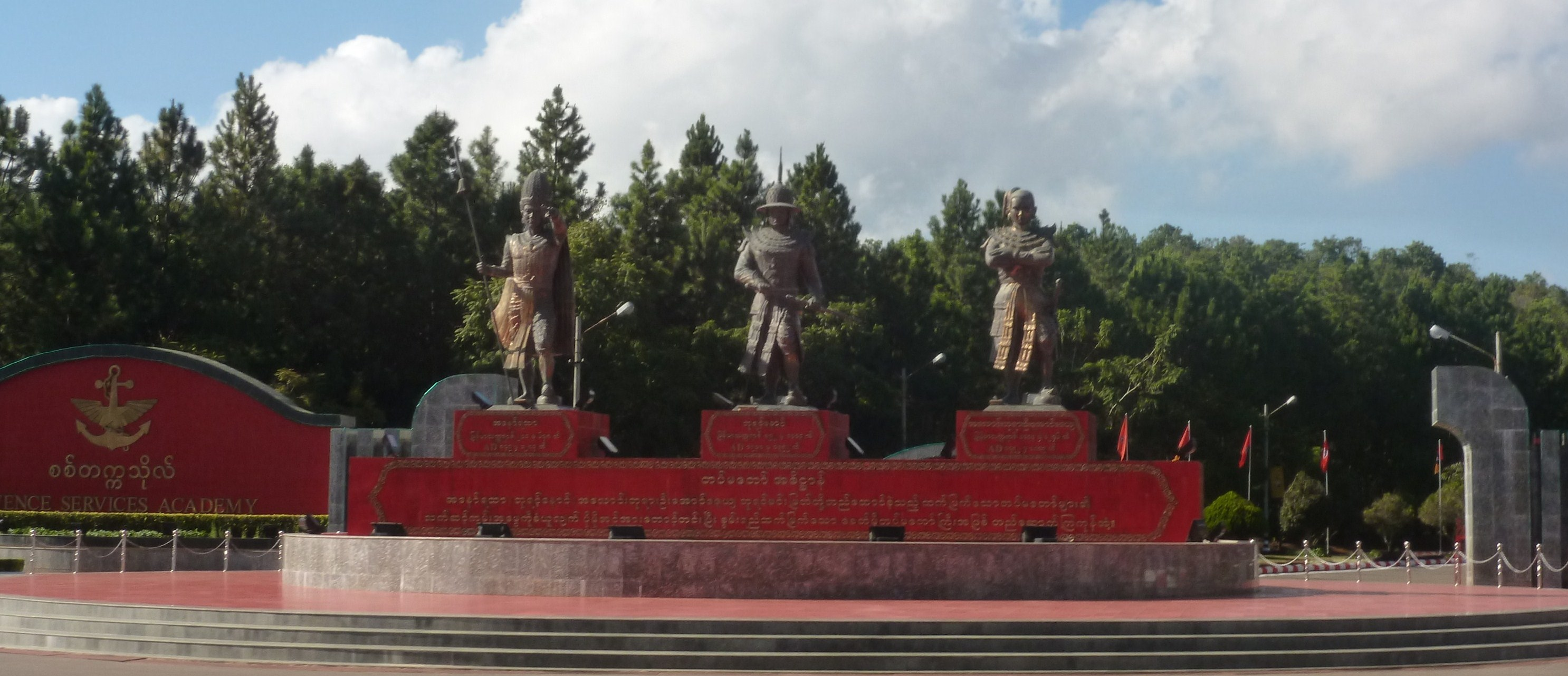
Statue of Anawrahta (far left) along with the statues of Bayinnaung and Alaungpaya in front of the DSA.

Anawrahta is considered one of the greatest, if not the greatest, king of Burmese history for he founded first "charter polity" of what would later become modern Burma. Not only did he greatly expand the Pagan Kingdom but he also implemented a series of political and administrative reforms that enabled his empire to dominate the Irrawaddy valley and its periphery for another 250 years.

Anawrahta's legacy went far beyond the borders of modern Burma. The success and longevity of Pagan's dominance over the Irrawaddy valley laid the foundation for the ascent of Burmese language and culture, the spread of Burman ethnicity in Upper Burma. His embrace of Theravada Buddhism and his success in stopping the advance of Khmer Empire, a Hindu kingdom, provided the Buddhist school, which had been in retreat elsewhere in South and Southeast Asia, a much-needed reprieve and a safe shelter. He helped restart Theravada Buddhism in Ceylon, the Buddhist school's original home. The success of Pagan dynasty made Theravada Buddhism's later growth in Lan Na, Siam, Lan Xang, and Cambodia, also due in a large part to Ceylon's interactions with those lands, in the 13th and 14th centuries possible. (Note: (Ricklefs et al 2010: 45–48): The spread of Theravada Buddhism in Siam, Lan Xang, and Cambodia was also aided by the interaction with Ceylon. However, the Ceylonese interaction was possible only because the Theravada monk order was restarted in 1071–1072 by the monks from Pagan per (Harvey 1925: 32–33) and (Htin Aung 1967: 35).)

== In popular culture ==
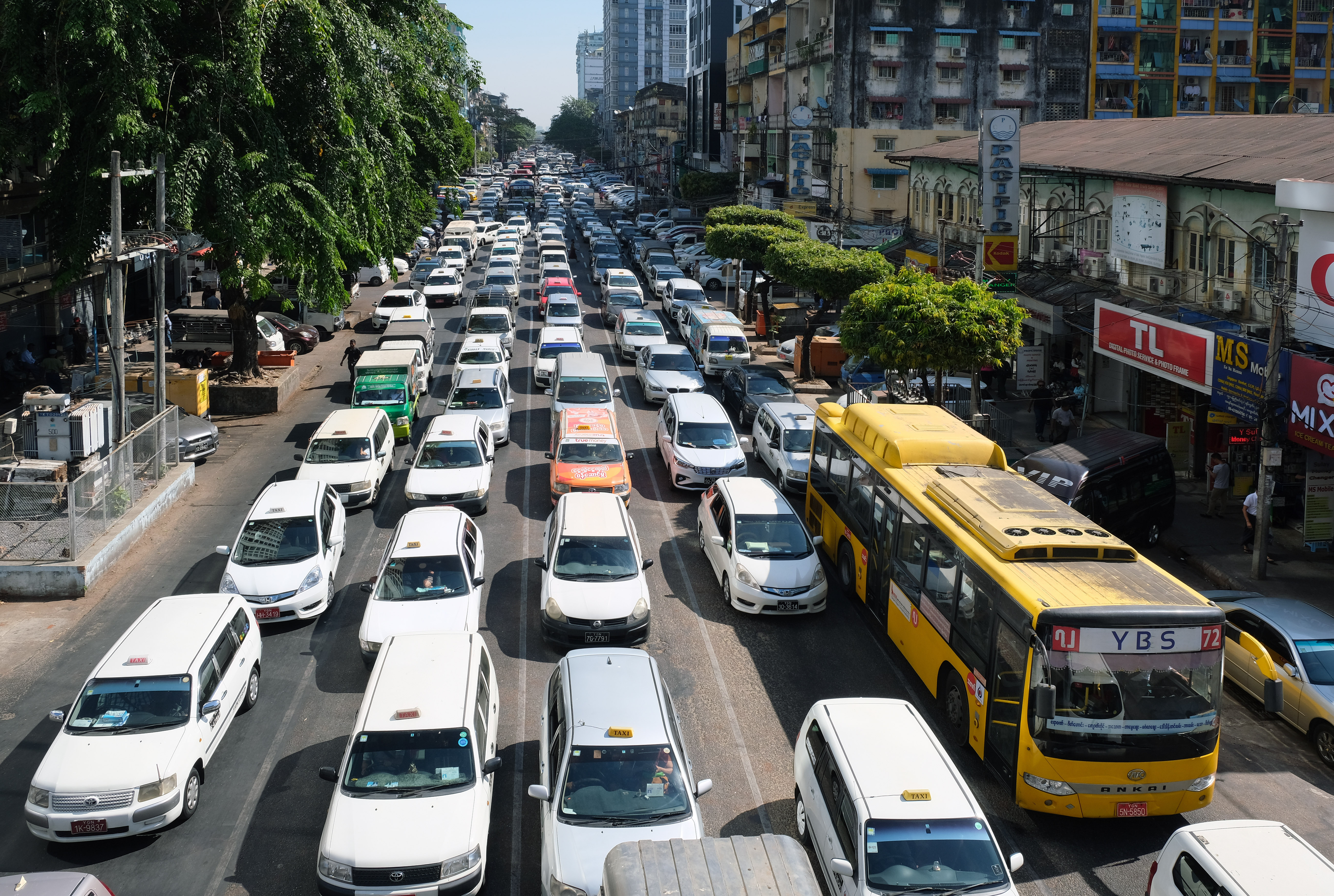
Anawrahta Road, Yangon.

Anawrahta's life stories and legends remain a popular subject of Burmese folklore. The love triangle involving Anawrahta, Kyansittha and Manisanda as well as the sad story of Saw Mon Hla, one of his queens, are a staple of Burmese theater. Due to his reputation as a stern father figure, he is not the central character in these stories where the main protagonist invariably is the romantic soldier-king Kyansittha. (Note: For Anawrahta's life as portrayed in popular fiction in English, see (Khin Myo Chit 1970). The work has also been translated into Burmese by Thawda Swe, and reprinted several times; see (Thawda Swe 2001, 4th printing). Subdued versions of chronicle stories about Anawrahta, Kyansittha, Manisanda and Saw Mon Hla can also be seen in scholarly works such as (Harvey 1925: 30–32) and (Htin Aung 1967: 32, 37–38).)

== Commemorations ==
- Anawrahta Road, a main avenue in Yangon
- UMS Anawrahta, Myanmar Navy Corvette
- Team Anawrahta, one of the five student teams in Burmese schools

== Bibliography ==
- Aung-Thwin, Michael (1985). Pagan: The Origins of Modern Burma. Honolulu: University of Hawai'i Press. ISBN 0-8248-0960-2.
- Aung-Thwin, Michael A. (2005). The Mists of Rāmañña: The Legend that was Lower Burma (illustrated ed.). Honolulu: University of Hawai'i Press. ISBN 978-0-8248-2886-8.
- Bo Lay, Dr. Meitthalat Lettwei Thutethana Kyan (in Burmese). Yangon: Su Paung.
- Coedès, George (1968). Walter F. Vella (ed.). The Indianized States of Southeast Asia. trans.Susan Brown Cowing. University of Hawaii Press. ISBN 978-0-8248-0368-1.
- Eade, J.C. (1989). Southeast Asian Ephemeris: Solar and Planetary Positions, A.D. 638–2000. Cornell University Press. ISBN 0-87727-704-4.
- Hall, D.G.E. (1960). Burma (3rd ed.). Hutchinson University Library. ISBN 978-1-4067-3503-1.
- Harvey, G. E. (1925). History of Burma: From the Earliest Times to 10 March 1824. London: Frank Cass & Co. Ltd.
- Htin Aung, Maung (1967). A History of Burma. New York and London: Cambridge University Press.
- Kala, U (1724). Maha Yazawin (in Burmese). Vol. 1–3 (2006, 4th printing ed.). Yangon: Ya-Pyei Publishing.
- Khin Myo Chit (1970). Anawrahta of Burma (1 ed.). Yangon: Sarpay Beikman.
- Khin Myo Chit (2001). Bagan Thuyegaung Mya (in Burmese). Translated by Thawda Swe (4 ed.). Yangon: Win Myint Aung Sarpay.
- Kyaw Thet (1962). History of Burma (in Burmese). Yangon: Yangon University Press.
- Lieberman, Victor B. (2003). Strange Parallels: Southeast Asia in Global Context, c. 800–1830, volume 1, Integration on the Mainland. Cambridge University Press. ISBN 978-0-521-80496-7.
- Maha Sithu (1798). Myint Swe (; Kyaw Win; Thein Hlaing (eds.). Yazawin Thit (in Burmese). Vol. 1–3 (2012, 2nd printing ed.). Yangon: Ya-Pyei Publishing.
- Myint-U, Thant (2006). The River of Lost Footsteps—Histories of Burma. Farrar, Straus and Giroux. ISBN 978-0-374-16342-6.
- Pe Maung Tin; G.H. Luce (1923). The Glass Palace Chronicle of the Kings of Burma (1960 ed.). Rangoon University Press.
- Phayre, Lt. Gen. Sir Arthur P. (1883). History of Burma (1967 ed.). London: Susil Gupta.
- Ricklefs, M.C.; Bruce McFarland Lockhart; Albert Lau; Portia Reyes; Maitrii Aung-Thwin; Bruce Lockhart (2010). A New History of Southeast Asia. Palgrave Macmillan. ISBN 978-0230212145.
- Royal Historians of Burma (c. 1680). U Hla Tin (ed.). Zatadawbon Yazawin (1960 ed.). Historical Research Directorate of the Union of Burma.
- Royal Historical Commission of Burma (1832). Hmannan Yazawin (in Burmese). Vol. 1–3 (2003 ed.). Yangon: Ministry of Information, Myanmar.
- Sandamala Linkara, Ashin (1931). Rakhine Yazawinthit Kyan (in Burmese). Vol. 1–2 (1997 ed.). Yangon: Tetlan Sarpay.
- >Sarma, Ramanimohan (1986). Political History of Tripura (PDF). Calcutta: Puthipatra.
- South, Ashley (2003). Mon nationalism and civil war in Burma: the golden sheldrake. Routledge. ISBN 978-0-7007-1609-8.
- Tarling, Nicholas (1999). The Cambridge History of Southeast Asia: Early Times to c. 1500. ISBN 978-0-521-66369-4.

Anawrahta Pagan Dynasty Born: 11 May 1014 Died: 11 April 1077
Regnal titles
Preceded by Sokkate	King of Burma; 1044–1077	Succeeded by Saw Lu
