= Ari Buddhism =

Historical religious practice in Burma

Ari Buddhism or the Ari Gaing (Burmese: အရည်းဂိုဏ်း, IPA: [əjí ɡáiɰ̃]) is the name given to the religious practice common in Burma prior to Anawrahta's rise and the subsequent conversion of Bagan to Theravada Buddhism in the eleventh century. It was introduced in the 7th century, possibly through trade contact from India or Tibet.

== History ==
Ari practices have largely been categorized as a tantric form of Buddhism, combining elements of Buddhism, nat worship, indigenous nāga worship and Hinduism. Some scholars claim that it is related to the tradition known as Azhali Buddhism of Nanzhao and the subsequent Dali Kingdom in modern-day Yunnan, China. Other historians like Than Tun contend that the Aris were forest-dwelling monks who simply differed in monastic practice from Theravadin bhikkhus, especially with regard to adherence to the Vinaya, as they were much less orthodox, allowed to consume alcohol, engage in sexual relations, and eat after midday. Despite his conversion to Theravada Buddhism due to the efforts of a Mon bhikkhu named Shin Arahan, Anawrahta still supported Mahayana cultic practices and printed coins in Sanskrit rather than Pali.

They are likely to have had influence on the development of the weizza tradition of Southern Esoteric Buddhism

== Bibliography ==
- Bhattacharya, Swapna (1994). Uta Gärtner, Jens Lorenz (ed.). Tradition and modernity in Myanmar. LIT Verlag Münster. pp. 251–268. ISBN 978-3-8258-2186-9.
- Chan, Maung (March 2005) Theravada Buddhism and Shan/Thai/Dai/Laos Regions.
