= Maha Yazawin Kyaw =

National chronicle of Myanmar

- Author: Monywe Zetawun Sayadaw
- Original title: ရာဇိန္ဒ ရာဇဝရ မဏ္ဍနီ Yazeinda Yazawara Mandani
- Language: Burmese
- Series: Burmese chronicles
- Genre: Chronicle, History
- Publication date: 1831–1832
- Publication place: Kingdom of Burma
- Media type: Parabaik paper

Yazeinda Yazawara Mandani (Rājinda Rājavara Maṇḍanī), or more commonly known as Maha Yazawin Kyaw (Burmese: မဟာ ရာဇဝင်ကျော်, pronounced [məhà jàzəwɪ̀ɰ̃ tɕɔ̀]; lit. 'Great Celebrated Chronicle'), is a Konbaung period national chronicle of Burma (Myanmar). The chronicle is very similar to Hmannan Yazawin, the official chronicle of Konbaung Dynasty, except for its more sympathetic treatment of the last Toungoo kings.

== Brief ==
The chronicle had already been in the works in May 1829 when its author Monywe Zetawun Sayadaw, a Buddhist monk and one of the "most learned scholars" of the day was tapped by King Bagyidaw to head the Royal Historical Commission of Burma. The commission was asked to write a new official chronicle. The Sayadaw had already written an abridged chronicle in 1810, and Maha Yazawin Kyaw was intended to be a comprehensive national chronicle. For the next three years and four months, the monk and the commission worked on compiling the new chronicle.

While working on Hmannan, the monk however disagreed with other members of the commission on their portrayal of the last Toungoo kings. He felt that the existing assessments of the Toungoo kings by the Konbaung historians were too harsh and unwarranted. Though he was the head of the commission, his views did not prevail. The monk continued to work with the commission to the completion of the chronicle but also completed his own version c. 1831–1832 before Hmannan was officially completed. Aside from its more sympathetic narrative of the late Toungoo period, Maha Yazawin Kyaw does not differ much from the rest of Hmannan.

== See also ==
- Burmese chronicles
