= Kyiso =

Kyiso ကျဉ်စိုး
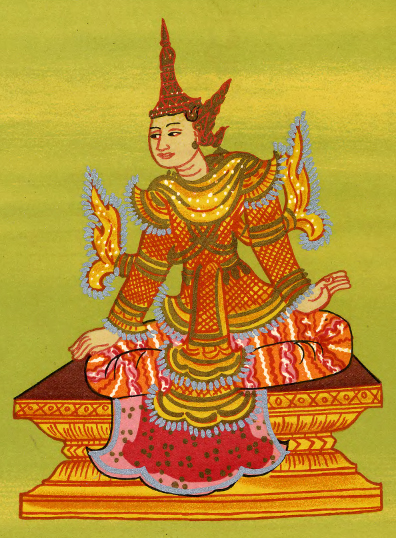
- Represented as Shin Mingaung nat (spirit)

King of Pagan
- Reign: 1021–1038
- Predecessor: Kunhsaw Kyaunghpyu
- Successor: Sokkate
- Born: c. December 1000 c. Pyatho 362 ME (Tuesday born) (Note: (Hmannan Vol. 1 2003: 227): Kyiso was born 3 months earlier than his half-brother Sokkate. (Zata 1960: 63): Sokkate was born in Kason 363 ME. It means Kyiso was born c. Pyatho/Tabodwe of 362 ME (29 November 1000 to 26 January 1001). Since he was born on a Tuesday, he was born between 3 Dec 1000 to 21 January 1001.); Pagan
- Died: c. April 1038 (aged 37); Monywa
- House: Pagan
- Father: Nyaung-u Sawrahan
- Mother: Taung Pyinthe
- Religion: Buddhism

Kyiso (Burmese: ကျဉ်စိုး, pronounced [tɕɪ̀ɰ̃só]; c. 1000–1038) was a king of the Pagan dynasty from 1021 to 1038. According to the Burmese chronicles, Kyiso was a son of King Nyaung-u Sawrahan but raised by King Kunhsaw Kyaunghpyu. After overthrowing Nyuang-u, Kunhsaw married Nyuang-u's three chief queens, two of whom were pregnant and subsequently gave birth to Kyiso and Sokkate. Kunhsaw raised Sokkate and Kyiso as his own sons. When the two sons reached manhood, they forced Kunhsaw to abdicate the throne and become a monk.

Kyiso was an avid hunter, and was killed in a hunting accident near Monywa. He became Pareinma Shin Mingaung (Burmese: ပရိမ္မ ရှင်မင်းခေါင် [pəɹèɪɰ̃ma̰ ʃɪ̀ɰ̃ mɪ́ɰ̃ɡàʊɰ̃], "Usurper Mingaung of Pareinma") or Yoma Shin Mingaung nat or a spirit in Burmese folk religion.

== Dates ==
Various chronicles disagree on the dates regarding his life and reign. The oldest chronicle Zatadawbon Yazawin is considered to be the most accurate for the Pagan period. (Note: (Maha Yazawin 2006: 346–349): Among the four major chronicles, only Zatadawbon Yazawin's dates line up with Anawrahta's inscriptionally verified accession date of 1044 CE. (Aung-Thwin 2005: 121–123): In general, Zata is considered "the most accurate of all Burmese chronicles, particularly with regard to the best-known Pagan and Ava kings, many of whose dates have been corroborated by epigraphy.") The table below lists the dates given by four main chronicles, as well as Hmannan's dates when anchored by the Anawrahta's inscriptionally verified accession date of 1044. The length of reign for Kyiso is given as 17 years by Zata but as six years by the others. According to Zata, it was Sokkate, the successor and brother of Kyiso, who ruled for six years.

Chronicles	Birth–Death	Age	Reign	Length of reign
Zatadawbon Yazawin	1000–1038	38	1021–1038	17
Maha Yazawin	950–977	26	971–977	6
Yazawin Thit and Hmannan Yazawin	964–992	27	986–992	6
Hmannan adjusted	992–1020	27	1014–1020	6

== Bibliography ==
- Aung-Thwin, Michael A. (2005). The Mists of Rāmañña: The Legend that was Lower Burma (illustrated ed.). Honolulu: University of Hawai'i Press. ISBN 9780824828868.
- Harvey, G. E. (1925). History of Burma: From the Earliest Times to 10 March 1824. London: Frank Cass & Co. Ltd.
- Kala, U (1724). Maha Yazawin Gyi (in Burmese). Vol. 1–3 (2006, 4th printing ed.). Yangon: Ya-Pyei Publishing.
- Royal Historians of Burma (c. 1680). U Hla Tin (Hla Thamein) (ed.). Zatadawbon Yazawin (1960 ed.). Historical Research Directorate of the Union of Burma.
- Royal Historical Commission of Burma (1832). Hmannan Yazawin (in Burmese). Vol. 1–3 (2003 ed.). Yangon: Ministry of Information, Myanmar.

Kyiso Pagan Dynasty Born: c. December 1000 Died: c. April 1038
Regnal titles
Preceded by Kunhsaw Kyaunghpyu	King of Pagan; 1021–1038	Succeeded by Sokkate
