= Yazawin Thit =

National chronicle of Burma

Maha Yazawin Thit
- Author: Twinthin Taikwun Maha Sithu
- Original title: မဟာ ရာဇဝင် သစ်
- Language: Burmese
- Series: Burmese chronicles
- Genre: Chronicle, History
- Publication date: 1798
- Publication place: Kingdom of Burma
- Preceded by: Maha Yazawin
- Followed by: Hmannan Yazawin

Maha Yazawin Thit (Burmese: မဟာ ရာဇဝင် သစ်, pronounced [məhà jàzəwɪ̀ɰ̃ ðɪʔ]; lit. 'New Great Chronicle'; also known as Myanmar Yazawin Thit or Yazawin Thit) is a national chronicle of Burma (Myanmar). Completed in 1798, the chronicle was the first attempt by the Konbaung court to update and check the accuracy of Maha Yazawin, the standard chronicle of the previous Toungoo Dynasty. Its author Twinthin Taikwun Maha Sithu consulted several existing written sources, and over 600 stone inscriptions collected from around the kingdom between 1783 and 1793. It is the first historical document in Southeast Asia compiled in consultation with epigraphic evidence.

The chronicle updates the events up to 1785, and contains several corrections and critiques of earlier chronicles. However, the chronicle was not well received, and ultimately rejected by the king and the court who found the critiques of earlier chronicles excessively harsh. It became known as A-pe-gan Yazawin (အပယ်ခံ ရာဇဝင်, the "Discarded Chronicle").

Nonetheless, when Hmannan Yazawin, the first officially accepted chronicle of Konbaung Dynasty, appeared in 1832, it had incorporated many of Yazawin Thit's corrections, in particular regnal dates of Pagan period kings. Modern scholarship notes the chronicle's innovative use of epigraphy but does not find the chronicle's criticisms harsh. Rather, scholarship maintains that for its criticisms and corrections, the chronicle largely retains traditional narratives, and "was —as elsewhere in the world —written with didactic intentions".

It remains one of the lesser known chronicles today.

== The name ==
The chronicle is sometimes reported as Myanma Yazawin Thit, lit. the "New Chronicle of Myanmar". However, Thaw Kaung, the former Chief Librarian of the Universities Central Library in Yangon, writes that the original name found in the two extant original manuscripts stored at the Central Library is Maha Yazawin Thit, and that the name "Myanmar" was inserted in the title in 1968 by the publisher of that edition. Thaw Kaung adds that the 1968 copy was picked up by international scholars who subsequently reported the chronicle under the name of Myanma Yazawin Thit. (Note: (Thaw Kaung 2010: 45, 56) states Victor Lieberman, a foremost historian of Burma, was the first one who reported it as "Twin-thin-taik-wun, whose 1798 chronicle may have been the first to put Burma ("Myan-ma") in its title". However, Thaw Kaung does not cite the publication of the quote in the text or in the end notes.) The name Myanma Yazawin Thit continues to be used in English language works. (Note: (Aung-Thwin 2005: 142–144) and (Woolf 2011: 416) both call it Myanma Yazawin Thit. Scholarship uses "Myanma" instead of "Myanmar" without the non-rhotic "r".)

== Background ==
The chronicle has its beginnings in a seemingly unrelated royal project. On 24 July 1783, King Bodawpaya issued a royal decree to: (1) collect stone inscriptions from all important monasteries and pagodas around the kingdom, (2) study them to demarcate religious glebe lands from taxable lands, and (3) recast the inscriptions if necessary. He put Twinthin Taikwun Maha Sithu, his former tutor and chief interior minister, and Thetpan Atwinwun Yaza Bala Kyawhtin, another senior minister, in charge of the effort. The two ministers moved hundreds of inscriptions to then capital Amarapura, and began to study them.

Though the purpose of the project was to verify claims to tax-free religious property, Twinthin, a "learned polymath", quickly noticed several discrepancies between the dates given in Maha Yazawin, the standard chronicle of the monarchy, and the dates given in the contemporary inscriptions he was examining. (Twinthin had already written a biographic chronicle of King Alaungpaya in 1770.) He reported his early findings to the king. The king, who was interested in reading history and had wanted to update Maha Yazawin, commissioned "a new chronicle of the realm which would be more in accord with the stone inscriptions". He appointed Twinthin to write the new chronicle.

== Organization and content ==
Twinthin, who may have been writing a chronicle as early as 1782, predating the inscription collection project, began writing the chronicle in earnest after the collection was completed in 1793. He referenced several existing chronicles, inscriptions as well as eigyin and mawgun poems. He completed the new chronicle in 1798 in 15 volumes (fascicles of parabaik paper). He had updated the events to 1785.

Yazawin Thit is noted for its novel organization and for its criticisms of earlier chronicles. It is organized by dynasties and periods whereas all the other Burmese chronicles (except Zatadawbon Yazawin) are organized strictly along the linear order of kings. (However, Zata is mainly a list of regnal dates and horoscopes, not a full-fledged national chronicle like Yazawin Thit). Twinthin's choice of organizing along dynastic lines was a notable departure from then prevailing practice. All historians of Theravada Buddhist tradition, (Burmese, Sinhalese and Thai), had treated their kings as cakkavatti universal monarchs, rather than kings who were leaders of national groups.

Though organized differently, the chronicle's content closely followed the narratives of the earlier chronicles. The chronicle however does contain several corrections (most notably, regnal dates of earliest kings) and critiques of the earlier chronicles, especially Maha Yazawin. Twinthin highlighted several inconsistencies and mistakes of the earlier chroniclers, and made no apologies for correcting earlier writers' work.

== Rejection ==
Twinthin's critiques were taken by the court as a criticism of one's elders/ancestors, a behavior highly frowned upon in Burmese culture. Although the king himself had commissioned the chronicle, he did not accept the chronicle when his former tutor presented it to him. The chronicle came to be viewed as the "antithesis" to Maha Yazawin's "thesis", and became known as A-pe-gan Yazawin (အပယ်ခံ ရာဇဝင်, the "Discarded Chronicle").

Twinthin's views are not viewed as harsh by modern academics. Pe Maung Tin notes that Yazawin Thit "with all its criticisms, on the whole follows the Great Chronicle" (Maha Yazawin). The author, for all his academic zeal, still "shared the purpose of early writers to legitimize the dynasty", and "had similar priorities in terms of content" with early chroniclers.

== Significance ==
The chronicle is the first known historical document in Southeast Asia to use epigraphic sources. According to (Woolf 2011), it shows that historians in Southeast Asia were using epigraphy for sourcing and verification around the same time as the practice was first used in Europe, even if Twinthin's methods may not have "evolved into a formal method". Woolf continues that "We should not overstate the 'scientific' character of these works since much Burmese historiography was — as elsewhere in the world — written with didactic intentions."

Using epigraphy, Twinthin updated the regnal dates of earliest Burmese kingdoms. Hmannan, the official chronicle of Konbaung court, would retain nearly all of Twinthin's corrections. The table below shows a comparison of the regnal dates of Pagan Dynasty. Hmannan's dates largely follow Yazawin Thit's.

Name	Reign per Zatadawbon Yazawin	Reign per Maha Yazawin	Reign per Yazawin Thit	Reign per Hmannan Yazawin	Reign per scholarship
Pyinbya	846–876	846–858	846–878	846–878	
Tannet	876–904	858–876	878–906	878–906	
Sale Ngahkwe	904–934	876–901	906–915	906–915	
Theinhko	934–956	901–917	915–931	915–931	
Nyaung-u Sawrahan	956–1001	917–950	931–964	931–964	
Kunhsaw Kyaunghpyu	1001–1021	950–971	964–986	964–986	
Kyiso	1021–1038	971–977	986–992	986–992	
Sokkate	1038–1044	977–1002	992–1017	992–1017	
Anawrahta	1044–1077	1002–1035	1017–1059	1017–1059	1044–1077
Saw Lu	1077–1084	1035–1061	1059–1066	1059–1066	1077–1084
Kyansittha	1084–1111	1063–1088 (Note: (Maha Yazawin Vol. 1 184–185): Saw Lu died in 423 ME (1061–1062 CE), and his death was followed by two years interregnum. Kyansittha succeeded the throne only in 425 ME (1063–1064 CE).)	1064–1093	1064–1092	1084–1112/1113
Sithu I	1111–1167	1088–1158	1093–1168	1092–1167	1112/1113–1167
Narathu	1167–1170	1158–1161	1168–1171	1167–1171	1167–1170
Naratheinkha	1170–1173	1161–1164	1171–1174	1171–1174	1170–1174
Sithu II	1173–1210	1164–1197	1174–1211	1174–1211	1174–1211
Htilominlo	1210–1234	1197–1219	1211–1234	1211–1234	1211–1235
Kyaswa	1234–1249	1219–1234	1234–1250	1234–1250	1235–1249
Uzana	1249–1254	1234–1240	1250–1255	1250–1255	1249–1256
Narathihapate	1254–1287	1240–1284	1255–1286	1255–1286	1256–1287
Kyawswa; Vassal of Mongols (1297)	1287–1300	1286–1300 (Note: (Maha Yazawin Vol. 1 2006: 252): Kyawswa came to power after two years of interregnum.)	1286–1298	1286–1298	1289–1297
Saw Hnit; Vassal of Myingsaing and Pinya	1300–1331	1300–1322	1298–1330	1298–1325	?
Uzana II; Vassal of Pinya and Ava	1331–1368	1322–1365	1330–1368	1325–1368	?

== Current status ==
For all its groundbreaking introductions, the chronicle remains one of the "lesser known" chronicles today. Moreover, only the first 13 of the total 15 volumes have been found and published. (The Universities Central Library of Myanmar has portions of two original manuscripts of the chronicle. Of the original 15 volumes, only the first 13 volumes, which cover up to 1754, have survived. The 14th volume is believed to be the same as Twinthin's 1770 work, Alaungpaya Ayedawbon, the biographic chronicle of King Alaungpaya, covering up to 1760. It means the last volume, which covers from 1760 to 1785, has not been recovered. The last volume did exist as it was referenced by later Konbaung writers.)

== Bibliography ==
- Aung-Thwin, Michael A. (2005). The Mists of Rāmañña: The Legend that was Lower Burma (illustrated ed.). Honolulu: University of Hawai'i Press. ISBN 9780824828868.
- Charney, Michael W. (2006). Powerful Learning: Buddhist Literati and the Throne in Burma's Last Dynasty, 1752–1885. Ann Arbor: University of Michigan.
- Hall, D.G.E. (1961). Historians of South East Asia. London: Oxford University Press.
- Kala, U (1720). Maha Yazawin Gyi (in Burmese). Vol. 1–3 (2006, 4th printing ed.). Yangon: Ya-Pyei Publishing.
- Royal Historical Commission of Burma (1829–1832). Hmannan Yazawin (in Burmese). Vol. 1–3 (2003 ed.). Yangon: Ministry of Information, Myanmar.
- Thaw Kaung, U (2010). Aspects of Myanmar History and Culture. Yangon: Gangaw Myaing.
- Woolf, Daniel (2011). A Global History of History (reissue, illustrated ed.). Cambridge, UK: Cambridge University Press. ISBN 978-0-521-69908-2.
