= Hmannan Yazawin =

Chronicle of Burma

- Author: Royal Historical Commission
- Original title: မှန်နန်း မဟာ ရာဇဝင်တော်ကြီး Hmannan Maha Yazawindawgyi
- Language: Burmese
- Series: Burmese chronicles
- Genre: Chronicle, History
- Publication date: September 1832
- Publication place: Kingdom of Burma
- English publication date: 1923 (to Pagan Dynasty)
- Media type: Print
- Preceded by: Yazawin Thit
- Followed by: Dutiya Yazawin

Hmannan Maha Yazawindawgyi (Burmese: မှန်နန်း မဟာ ရာဇဝင်တော်ကြီး, pronounced [m̥àɰ̃náɰ̃ məhà jàzəwɪ̀ɰ̃dɔ̀dʑí]; commonly, Hmannan Yazawin; known in English as the Glass Palace Chronicle) is the first official chronicle of Konbaung Dynasty of Burma (Myanmar). It was compiled by the Royal Historical Commission between 1829 and 1832. The compilation was based on several existing chronicles and local histories, and the inscriptions collected on the orders of King Bodawpaya, as well as several types of poetry describing epics of kings. Although the compilers disputed some of the earlier accounts, they by and large retained the accounts given Maha Yazawin, the standard chronicle of Toungoo Dynasty.

The chronicle, which covers events right up to 1821, right before the First Anglo-Burmese War (1824–1826), was not written purely from a secular history perspective but rather to provide "legitimation according to religious criteria" of the monarchy. The "most important development" in Hmannan was the replacement of the hitherto prevalent pre-Buddhist origin story of Burmese monarchy with one that links the origins of the monarchy to the clan of the Buddha and the first king of Buddhist mythology, Maha Sammata.

Hmannan was the main chronicle referenced by early European scholars to write the earliest versions of Burmese history, and it still is the main standard chronicle in the study of Burmese history.

== Etymology ==
The name of the chronicle comes from Hmannan or the Palace of Mirrors, the building of the Inwa Palace complex where the chronicle was compiled, and yazawin (ရာဇဝင်) from Pali rājavaṃsa meaning "chronicle of kings". It is conventionally translated as the "Glass Palace Chronicle" although a more accurate translation should be the "Chronicle of the Palace of Mirrors".

== Background ==
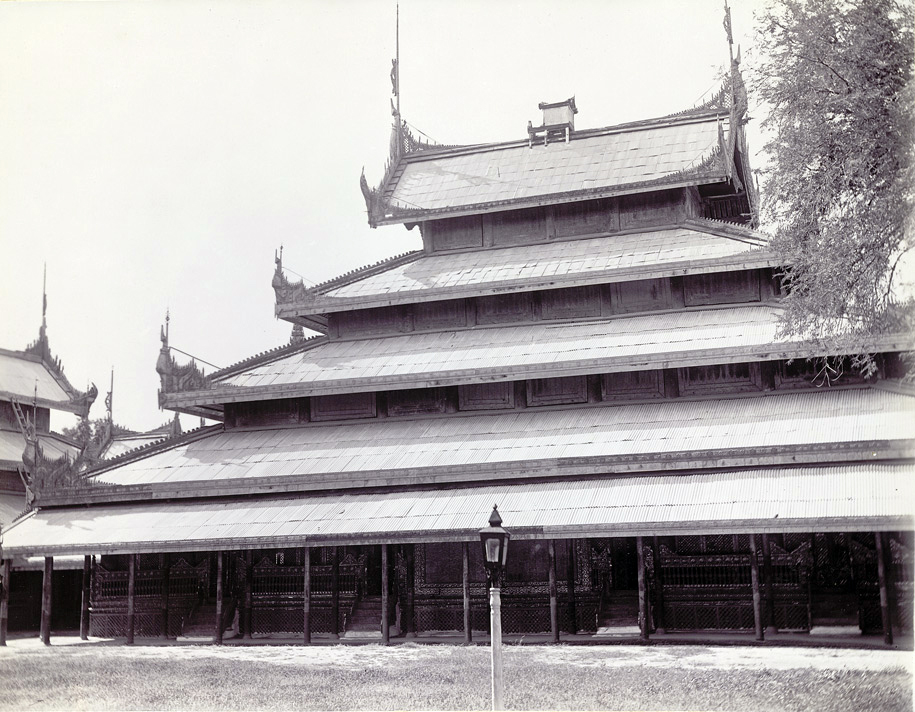
The old Glass Palace at Mandalay Palace, similar to the one from the Inwa Palace

In early 1829, King Bagyidaw ordered the Royal Historical Commission to update the royal chronicles. The kingdom had just come off the disastrous First Anglo-Burmese War (1824–1826) after which Konbaung Burma was forced to cede all of its western empire (Arakan, Manipur and Assam) plus the entire Tenasserim coast south of the Salween River. Moreover, the royal treasury was severely being depleted to pay the British one million pounds sterling (about $2 billion in 2006 US dollars) as war reparations in four installations. (Note: (Htin Aung 1967: 220): Bagyidaw would later deliver the balance of the indemnity at great sacrifice in November 1832.) Updating the chronicles was perhaps a fitting task "when the future seemed unclear, the present had become so painful, and the lessons of the past needed a more proper accounting."

The standard official chronicle at the time was Maha Yazawin (The Great Chronicle), the standard chronicle of Toungoo Dynasty that covers up to 1711. Konbaung Dynasty's first chronicle Yazawin Thit (The New Chronicle of Myanmar), commissioned by Bagyidaw's predecessor and grandfather Bodawpaya and covers up to 1785, had not been accepted as an official chronicle because the new chronicle contained severely harsh criticisms of earlier chronicles. Although it was Bodawpaya himself who ordered the author of Yazawin Thit to verify the accuracy of Maha Yazawin by consulting a variety of sources including hundreds of inscriptions, the king did not accept the new chronicle when it was presented to him.

== Compilation ==
The 13-member Royal Historical Commission consisted of learned monks, court historians and court Brahmins. When the commission convened the first time on 11 May 1829 (1st waxing of Nayon 1191 ME), they had ready access to a number of historical sources: over 600 inscriptions (some originals and some recast copies of the originals) collected between 1783 and 1793, several prior Burmese chronicles (yazawins and ayedawbons), local pagoda histories (thamaings), Pali religious chronicles and Burmese poetical literature (eigyins, mawguns and yazawin thanbauks).

The commission was led by Monywe Zetawun Sayadaw, one of the "most learned monks" of the day. The monk had already compiled an abridged chronicle in 1810, and had been writing a more comprehensive chronicle when he was appointed to write the next official chronicle. He was assisted by another learned monk, Thawkabin Sayadaw. The two monks were given the task of scrutinizing the earlier chronicles in prose, especially the two main ones: Maha Yazawin and Yazawin Thit. Moreover, they also acted as "consulting editors". The two monks were assisted by an ex-monk and a senior minister at the court, Maha Dhamma Thingyan, who also checked the two main chronicles for historical sources, and decided what to accept and what to reject. U Yauk and U Chein scrutinized twelve volumes of old eigyin poems, and nine minor chronicles (yazawins) and five biographic chronicles (ayedawbons). The other officials were scribes like U Hpyaw and court Brahmins who checked Indian sources for records of court ceremonies like royal coronations, ceremonies for building new palaces, etc.

It took three years and four months for the commission to complete the new chronicle. The commission had organized the chronicle was into two parts: The first part covers from time immemorial to the last dynasty (to 1752); the second part (also called Konbaung-Zet Yazawin) covers then ruling Konbaung Dynasty to 1821. Not all of the authors agreed with the conclusions reached in the new chronicle. The head of the commission, Monywe Sayadaw, felt the portrayal of the last Toungoo kings in earlier Konbaung accounts was too harsh, and decided to publish his own chronicle called Maha Yazawin Kyaw ("Great Celebrated Chronicle") in 1831.

== Analysis ==
Though the main tasks of the commission ostensibly were to verify the accuracy of the prior chronicles, and update the history to their day (1829–1832), the chroniclers had at least another equally important task, which was to provide "legitimation according to religious criteria" of the Burmese monarchy. The new chronicle did bring up Burmese history to 1821, right before the First Anglo-Burmese War. However, despite having consulted the inscriptions and a variety of sources, the commission left much of the accounts of Maha Yazawin largely unchanged.

The authors did try to verify Maha Yazawin's dates which did not agree with those given in Zatadawbon Yazawin. Maha Yazawin's dates for Pagan Dynasty were off by as much as 42 years from Zata (for the accession date of Anawrahta). Earlier historians had already tried to reconcile the glaring differences between the two prior chronicles. In 1798, Yazawin Thit tried to bridge the gap; its dates are about 15 more years closer to Zata's dates but still 27 years off. (Note: (Hmannan Vol. 1 2003: 230) gives Anawrahta's accession date as 1017 versus (Maha Yazawin 2006: 154)'s 1002. Compare the dates to the actual date of 1044.) (Zata's dates later turned out to be the most accurate based on inscriptional evidence.) The authors of Hmannan chose to stay with Yazawin Thit's dates for the most part with just a few minor tweaks as seen in the table below. It shows a comparison of the regnal dates of the early Pagan kings (from Pyinbya, the fortifier of Pagan, according to the chronicles) as reported in the three chronicles.

| Name | Reign per Zatadawbon Yazawin | Reign per Maha Yazawin | Reign per Yazawin Thit | Reign per Hmannan Yazawin | Reign per scholarship |
|---|---|---|---|---|---|
| Pyinbya | 846–876 | 846–858 | 846–878 | 846–878 | |
| Tannet | 876–904 | 858–876 | 878–906 | 878–906 | |
| Sale Ngahkwe | 904–934 | 876–901 | 906–915 | 906–915 | |
| Theinhko | 934–956 | 901–917 | 915–931 | 915–931 | |
| Nyaung-u Sawrahan | 956–1001 | 917–950 | 931–964 | 931–964 | |
| Kunhsaw Kyaunghpyu | 1001–1021 | 950–971 | 964–986 | 964–986 | |
| Kyiso | 1021–1038 | 971–977 | 986–992 | 986–992 | |
| Sokkate | 1038–1044 | 977–1002 | 992–1017 | 992–1017 | |
| Anawrahta | 1044–1077 | 1002–1035 | 1017–1059 | 1017–1059 | 1044–1077 |
| Saw Lu | 1077–1084 | 1035–1061 | 1059–1066 | 1059–1066 | 1077–1084 |
| Kyansittha | 1084–1111 | 1063–1088 (Note: (Maha Yazawin Vol. 1 184–185): Saw Lu died in 423 ME (1061–1062 CE), and his death was followed by two years interregnum. Kyansittha succeeded the throne only in 425 ME (1063–1064 CE).) | 1064–1093 | 1064–1092 | 1084–1112/1113 |
| Sithu I | 1111–1167 | 1088–1158 | 1093–1168 | 1092–1167 | 1112/1113–1167 |
| Narathu | 1167–1170 | 1158–1161 | 1168–1171 | 1167–1171 | 1167–1170 |
| Naratheinkha | 1170–1173 | 1161–1164 | 1171–1174 | 1171–1174 | 1170–1174 |
| Sithu II | 1173–1210 | 1164–1197 | 1174–1211 | 1174–1211 | 1174–1211 |
| Htilominlo | 1210–1234 | 1197–1219 | 1211–1234 | 1211–1234 | 1211–1235 |
| Kyaswa | 1234–1249 | 1219–1234 | 1234–1250 | 1234–1250 | 1235–1249 |
| Uzana | 1249–1254 | 1234–1240 | 1250–1255 | 1250–1255 | 1249–1256 |
| Narathihapate | 1254–1287 | 1240–1284 | 1255–1286 | 1255–1286 | 1256–1287 |
| Kyawswa; Vassal of Mongols (1297) | 1287–1300 | 1286–1300 (Note: (Maha Yazawin Vol. 1 2006: 252): Kyawswa came to power after two years of interregnum.) | 1286–1298 | 1286–1298 | 1289–1297 |
| Saw Hnit; Vassal of Myingsaing/Pinya | 1300–1331 | 1300–1322 | 1298–1330 | 1298–1325 | ? |
| Uzana II; Vassal of Pinya and Ava | 1331–1368 | 1322–1365 | 1330–1368 | 1325–1368 | ? |

The authors of Hmannan also inserted a number of commentaries at several points of Maha Yazawin's text. Still, even when the commission disputed earlier accounts, their commentaries are mostly of an "extremely esoteric nature", and contain "little substantive critical analysis" from a secular history perspective. The few changes the commission brought in are strictly from a religious standpoint. (Note: (Aung-Thwin 2005: 144–145): The authors also preserved Shin Arahan's birth at Thaton, an assertion first made in Yazawin Thit.) Of those, the most important development was Hmannan's assertion that the Burmese monarchy had descended from the Sakya clan of the Buddha. The new narrative superseded the hitherto prevalent pre-Buddhist origin story of the monarchy which until then was supposed to have descended from one Pyusawhti, son of a solar spirit and a dragon princess. The authors asserted that Pyusawhti was actually a scion of the Sakyian Tagaung royalty, founded by Abhiyaza of the Sakya clan from Kapilavastu, the very region the Buddha was born. Pyusawhti's parents were now human beings—Thado Adeissa Yaza (lit. the "Sun King" in Pali) of Tagaung royalty, and his wife who had wished for a son at a local shrine honoring the dragon princess. This claim was to have a devastating impact on the reputation of the chronicle as a whole in the eyes of British colonial era scholars who dismissed much of the early history reported in the chronicles as "copies of Indian legends taken from Sanskrit or Pali originals". It was the prevalent mainstream scholarship view at least to the 1960s although prominent Burma historians of Burmese origin disagreed with the outright dismissal of the chronicles' early history. (Note: (Than Tun 1964: ix–x): the Abhiyaza story has given ammunition to the heavily biased accounts of colonial era scholarship. (Htin Aung 1970: 4–7): Hmannan's sudden linkage to the Buddha itself does not warrant the dismissal of the rest of the early history, for example, that the Tagaung Kingdom did not exist.) Latest research does show that when stripped of the legendary elements, which are now viewed as allegories, the chronicle narratives largely conform to the evidence. Archaeological evidence shows that many of the places mentioned in the royal records have been inhabited continuously for over three millennia, and the chronicle narratives of the pre-11th century history are considered "social memory" of the times.

Hmannan becomes increasingly more factual where "after the 11th century, the chronology of Burmese chronicles is reliable." One major reason is that Burmese chroniclers could read the inscriptions of the previous eras. Likewise, a 1986 study of Maha Yazawin, which Hmannan closely follows, finds much of the history for the 16th century, which was also witnessed by many Europeans, largely factual.

== Importance ==
Hmannan Yazawin is the standard Burmese chronicle, and the primary historical source material of Burmese history to the early 19th century. Almost all books on Burmese history down to the imperial period in English are chiefly based on Hmannan. It was also used by Thai historians to correct the pre-1767 chronology of the reconstructed post-1767 Siamese chronicles, which was off by a few decades.

== Translations ==
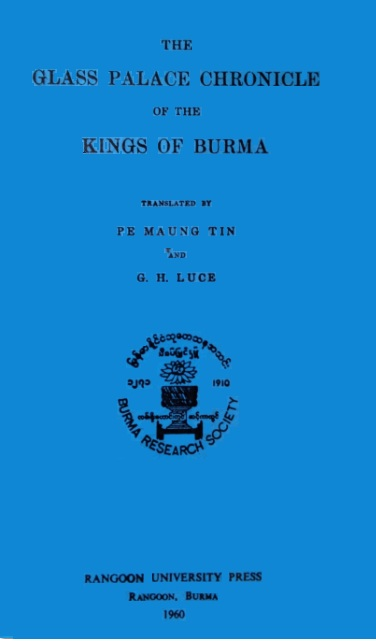
1960 2nd edition of GPC

Although all major Burmese history books are based on Hmannan, the entire chronicle has not yet been translated into a Western language. To date, only a portion—up to the end of Pagan Dynasty—has been translated into English as the Glass Palace Chronicle by Pe Maung Tin and Gordon Luce. In 1987, the Glass Palace Chronicle was translated into French as Pagan, l'univers bouddhique: Chronique du Palais de Cristal by P. H. Cerre and F. Thomas. The chronicle was, however, translated into Chinese in three volumes by the Commercial Press.
