= Maha Yazawin =

National chronicle of Burma

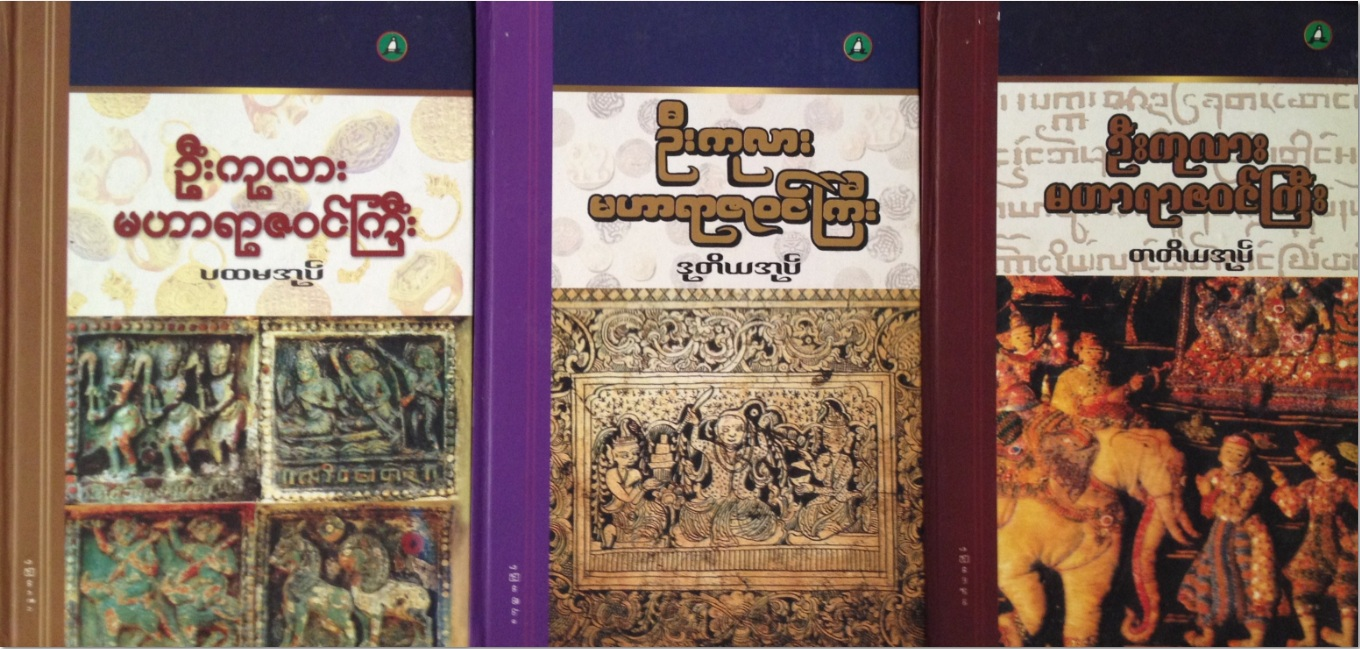
- Cover of 2006 three volume reprint
- Author: U Kala
- Original title: မဟာ ရာဇဝင်တော်ကြီး
- Language: Burmese
- Series: Burmese chronicles
- Genre: Chronicle, History
- Publication date: 1724
- Publication place: Toungoo Burma
- Media type: Parabaik
- Pages: 21 volumes (Full version); 10 volumes (Medium version); 1 volume (Abridged version)
- Followed by: Yazawin Thit

The Maha Yazawin, fully the Maha Yazawindawgyi (Burmese: မဟာ ရာဇဝင်တော်ကြီး, pronounced [məhà jàzəwɪ̀ɰ̃dɔ̀dʑí], Pali : Mahārājavaṃsa) and formerly romanized as the Maha-Radza Weng, is the first national chronicle of Burma/Myanmar. Completed in 1724 by U Kala, a historian at the Toungoo court, it was the first chronicle to synthesize all the ancient, regional, foreign and biographic histories related to Burmese history. Prior to the chronicle, the only known Burmese histories were biographies and comparatively brief local chronicles. The chronicle has formed the basis for all subsequent histories of the country, including the earliest English language histories of Burma written in the late 19th century.

The chronicle starts with the beginning of the current world cycle according to Buddhist tradition and the Buddhist version of ancient Indian history, and proceeds "with ever increasing detail to narrate the political story of the Irrawaddy basin from quasi-legendary dynasties to events witnessed by the author himself in 1711." Since it was written in the late Toungoo period, the chronicle provides its most specific information on dates and descriptions of various events Toungoo kings partook. The chronicle's portrayal of the 16th century Toungoo Burma, which was also witnessed by many Europeans, has been found by scholars to be largely factual.

However, its narrative of the earlier periods is less detailed, showing that the author did not have the full versions of earlier chronicles. Moreover, he did not check any inscriptions, which would have yielded more specific dates and double-checked the events. Nonetheless, the pre-1712 portions of later national Burmese chronicles — including Yazawin Thit, Maha Yazawin Kyaw, and Hmannan Yazawin — are essentially verbatim reproductions of this chronicle, though the later chronicles did correct many of Maha Yazawin's Pagan Dynasty and pre-Pagan dates based on epigraphic evidence.

== Background ==
Before this chronicle, hitherto Burmese histories were biographic chronicles and comparatively brief local chronicles. The compilation of the chronicle began c. 1712–1720, early in the reign of King Taninganway. The task was undertaken by U Kala, a wealthy descendant of court and regional administrative officers from both sides of his family. (His father was a "rich man" who descended from regional administrative officers (myosas) of the crown, and his mother was of mixed Shan and Burman noble descent.) He had the education, connections and wealth to devote his time to chronicle writing. With his pedigree, he apparently had access to court documents that went back to the reign of Bayinnaung (r. 1550–1581). Perhaps because of his wealth, Kala was able to devote his time being a "full-time chronicler".

== Composition ==
Kala prefaced his chronicle with an apology for its writing, noting that Buddhist scriptures considered the writing of history to be inimical to religious development. He justified his work by explaining that the study of past events would help to demonstrate the impermanence of all things, including political authority, and that meditation on this theme would actually promote religious insight.

When Kala completed the chronicle in 1724, he had compiled the chronicle in three versions by length: Maha Yazawin Gyi [The Great Chronicle in Twenty-One Volumes], Yazawin Lat [The Shorter Chronicle in Ten Volumes], Yazawin Gyok [The Brief Chronicle in One Volume]. The chronicle is said to have referenced court documents from the 16th century, and in all, over 70 regional and foreign texts. The notable list includes the "Thaton Chronicle," the "Mon Chronicle," the "Ayutthaya Chronicle," and the "Chiang Mai Chronicle" as well as the Mahavamsa for the early religious history. Though he used a variety of local chronicles, Kala did not include the history of Tagaung Kingdom, which would be claimed as the beginning of the Burmese monarchy a century later by Hmannan Yazawin.

The work is divided into three parts, the first two detailing the origin of the universe and Buddhist kings of ancient India. The third part relates the founding of Threhkittara and Pagan and proceeds to provide accounts of the Pinya, Sagaing, Ava and Toungoo dynasties, and takes the history down to his own time to 1711. A "salient characteristic" of the chronicle is "its composite character: the chronicle is a pastiche of legends, local histories, biographies, and detailed court records."

== Accuracy ==
Since it was written in the late Toungoo period, Maha Yazawin provides its most specific information on dates and descriptions of various events Toungoo kings partook. It traces the life of each king chronologically, wherever possible, from his birth to the grave or his dethronement. However, its narrative of the earlier periods is far more sketchy, offering only the year, not the specific date, in most cases. It shows that Kala did not have the full versions of earlier chronicles, and that he did not check any inscriptions, which would have yielded more specific dates and double-checked the events. Indeed, the later chronicles corrected many of Maha Yazawin's Pagan Dynasty and pre-Pagan dates based on epigraphic evidence.

Moreover, the chronicle also introduces for the first time that the Thaton Kingdom of Lower Burma was conquered by King Anawrahta of Pagan in 1057, and Anawrahta's religious reformation with the help of Shin Arahan, the primate of Pagan. (Maha Yazawin does not say that Shin Arahan was from Thaton. That he was born in Thaton was inserted in Yazawin Thit, written in 1798.) Later British colonial period scholars further asserted that Pagan received religious reforms and civilization from Thaton. Recently, the historian Michael Aung-Thwin has argued that the Thaton conquest story cannot be found in any prior extant texts or inscriptions.

However, the chronicle's portrayal of the 16th century Toungoo Burma, which was also witnessed by many Europeans, has been found by scholars to be largely factual.

== Significance ==
The chronicle has formed the basis for all subsequent histories of the country, including the earliest English language histories of Burma written in the late 19th century. The historian Victor Lieberman writes that "rarely has a national historiographic tradition depended so heavily on a single author as the Burmese tradition has on U Kala."

The chronicle's existence was especially made important because many of the original sources on which he relied were destroyed by a fire at Ava (Inwa) some twenty years later. In addition to this loss, U Kala's prose style was seen as a model in the eyes of all subsequent historians. The general tone of the chronicle is described as "not bombastic", "relatively subdued", and "matter-of-fact". The pre-1712 portions of later national Burmese chronicles — including Yazawin Thit (1798), Maha Yazawin Kyaw (1831), and the famous Hmannan Yazawin (the Glass Palace Chronicle) — are more or less verbatim reproductions of Maha Yazawin, "with some interpolations of quasi-legendary material and with limited digressions on points of scholarly dispute".

== Publications ==
As of 2022, the full chronicle had been published only in Burmese, and not translated in full into English or any other language. However, the last sections of the chronicle from 1597 to 1711 have been published in an English language translation by historian Tun Aung Chain. An unpublished partial translation by "U Ko Ko, formerly of the University of Mandalay" is cited and used by the author John Strong in "Relics of the Buddha."
