= Kyan Sit Min =

Kyansit Min
- Theatrical Release Poster
- Directed by: Lu Min
- Written by: Thein Hlaing (B.A.)
- Produced by: Everest Film Production
- Starring: Lu Min; Nyunt Win; Aung Khaing; Nyi Nanda; Htet Htet Moe Oo; May Than Nu; Pan Phyu; Soe Myat Nandar; Hlaing Phyu Phyu Htut; Wah Wah Win Shwe
- Cinematography: Myint U Oo Myint and Mya Myint Moe
- Edited by: Richard Ye Win
- Music by: Tan Yan Wei
- Distributed by: Everest Film Production
- Release date: May 27, 2005
- Running time: 142 minutes
- Country: Myanmar
- Language: Burmese

Kyansit Min (Burmese: ကျန်စစ်မင်း) or King Kyan Sit is a 2005 Burmese history drama film directed by Lu Min.

== Plot ==
The film follows a story of King Kyansittha of Bagan Dynasty.

== Cast ==
- Lu Min as Kyansittha
- Nyunt Win as Anawrahta
- Aung Khaing as Yamankan
- Nyi Nanda as Saw Lu
- Htet Htet Moe Oo as Queen Manisanda
- May Than Nu as Apeyadana
- Pan Phyu as Thanbula
- Soe Myat Nandar as Khin Tan
- Hlaing Phyu Phyu Htut as Princess Shwe Einthi
- Wah Wah Win Shwe
