= Gubyaukgyi Temple (Myinkaba) =

Prominent Buddhist temple in Bagan, Myanmar

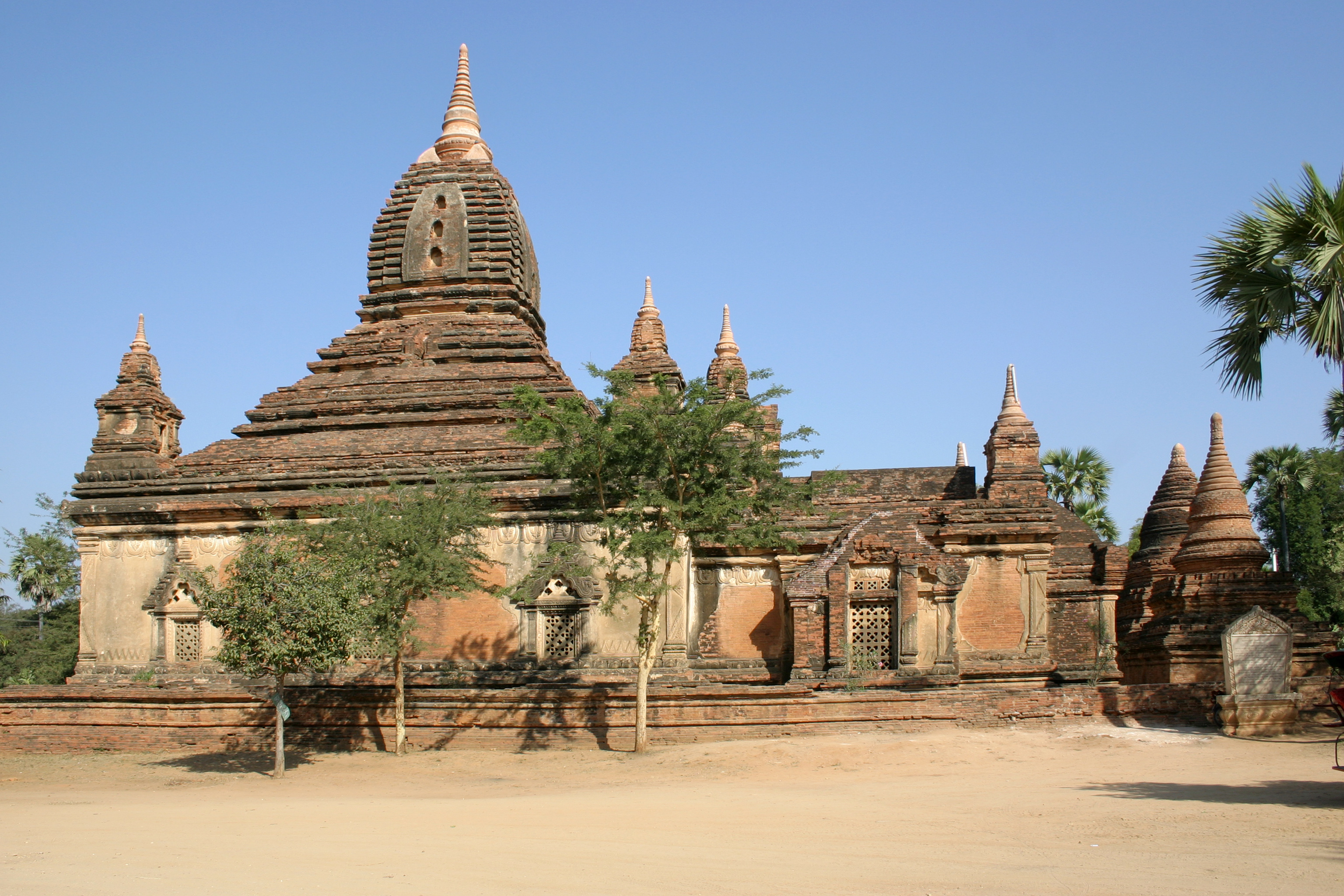
- Gubyaukgyi Temple

- Location within Myanmar

Religion
- Affiliation: Theravada Buddhism

Location
- Country: Myanmar
- Coordinates: 21°09′26″N 94°51′39″E

Architecture
- Founder: Prince Yazakumar
- Completed: 1113; 913 years ago

The Gubyaukgyi (alt. Kubyauk-gyi) temple, located just south of Bagan, Myanmar, in Myinkaba Village, is a Buddhist temple built in 1113 AD by Prince Yazakumar, shortly after the death of his father, King Kyansittha of the Pagan Dynasty. The temple is notable for two reasons. First, it contains a large array of well-preserved frescoes on its interior walls, the oldest original paintings to be found in Bagan. All of the frescoes are accompanied by ink captions written in Old Mon, providing one of the earliest examples of the language's use in Myanmar. Second, the temple is located just to the west of the Myazedi Pagoda, at which were found two stone pillars with inscriptions written in four, ancient Southeast Asian languages: Pali, Old Mon, Old Burmese, and Pyu. The inscription on the pillar displayed by the Myazedi Pagoda has been called the Burmese Rosetta Stone, given its significance both historically and linguistically, as a key to cracking the Pyu language.

== Physical Description ==
The style of the temple includes both Mon and Indian elements. In the case of the latter, the temple's towers are built in the Indian Shikhara style. The temple has a square base, shaped like a Kalatha pot, with a curvilinear roof. The interior of the temple contains a large, perimeter vestibule that connects to a small shrine room, a temple entrance leading to the vestibule, and an interior hallway leading to the shrine room. Both the shrine room and the entrance to the temple are on the east side of the building.

The temple has 11 large, perforated, Pyu-style windows, which let in very little light. Nine of the windows are in the outer walls, and two are interior windows. The windows' perforations are shaped in a variety of ways, including as Banyan leaves and swastikas.

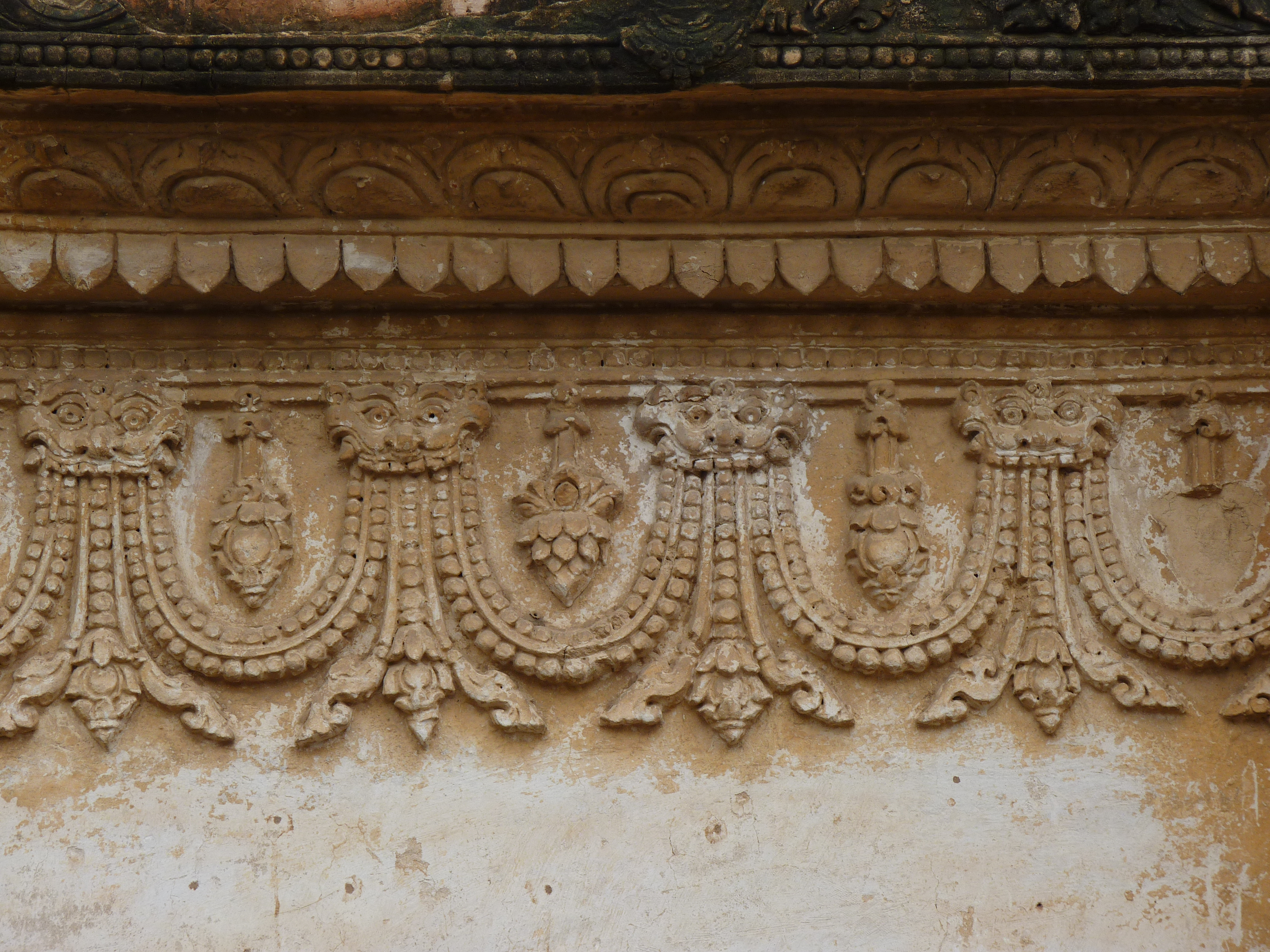
Stucco Ornamentation

In the interior above these windows are terraces with small Buddha figures, backed by intricate, ornamental stucco carvings with floral designs. Other stucco designs that can be seen in Gubyaukgyi include concentric rings and ogre figurines. There are also, in the walls, 34 recesses, each of which used to contain a statue of Buddha. Due to vandalism, however, only 19 of these statues remain.

== History ==
=== Construction ===
A popular retelling of the temple's construction goes as follows. Several decades before the construction of Gubyaukgyi, the wife of King Kyansittha, Queen Thanbula, became pregnant. At the time, the king had no son, and as such no direct heir to the throne. When the king learned of the queen's pregnancy, he asked her to leave the royal court. Upon leaving the court, he gave her a valuable ring. He told the queen that, if the baby were a boy, she would be welcomed back to the court, and would return the ring. If the baby were a girl, she was told she could sell the ring and should not return to the court.

The baby was a boy, Prince Yazakumar. However, by the time the queen returned to the king with their son, he had already promised his daughter's son, Alaungsithu, that he would be the heir to the kingdom. To compensate Yazakumar for losing his chance to inherit the throne, the king gave him a large amount of land. Yazakumar sold much of this land, and with the proceeds built Gubyaukgyi, out of appreciation for his father. To build the temple, Yazakumar employed three villages of slaves.

=== Background Behind Mon Style of Temple ===
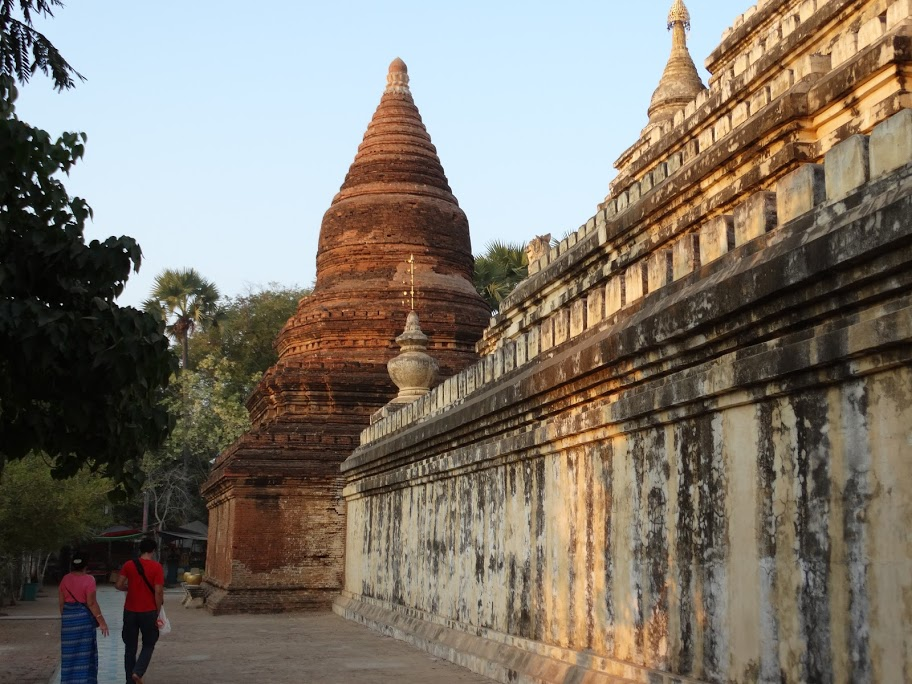
Gubyaukgyi temple

Around 1054 AD, the Burmese monarch and founder of the Pagan Empire, Anawrahta conquered the Mon capital of Thaton. He then brought back to Bagan the Mon king Makuta, several copies of the Tipitaka written in Mon, as well as numerous Mon monks and artists. Shortly thereafter, Makuta, while still a captive in Bagan, constructed the Mon-style Nanpaya Temple in Myinkaba Village, a mile south of the city. This prompted the construction of numerous other Mon-style temples in Bagan during the next century, from 1060 to 1160 AD, including Gubyaukgyi. Almost all Mon-style temples in Bagan were built during this century, and likewise, almost all of these temples have Mon language inscriptions.

=== Damage and Restoration ===
A 1982 UNESCO report concerning the conservation of 16 Bagan temples and monuments revealed a number of issues relating to the physical condition of Gubyaukgyi. On the exterior, the original cornice was lost, and in its place black algae and lichens had developed. A blue green lichen was further found lower on the exterior. Meanwhile, multiple areas of stucco were in danger of detachment. Interiorly, the entrance hallway had undergone extensive damage from earthquakes. The researchers also discovered insect damage and areas where the consolidant polyvinyl acetate had been applied to stabilize flaking paint.

Due to these issues, a 1984 joint UNESCO/UNDP project was launched to look into preserving several Bagan temples and monuments. The project came to fruition, and by 1991, a restoration of Gubyaukgyi was complete. The temple's interior frescoes were extensively cleaned, panels and stucco at risk of detachment were fortified, and anti-insect chemicals were applied. At the same time, electrical equipment, including lights, were installed in the temple.

== 3D Documentation ==
The Zamani Project from the University of Cape Town, South Africa, offered its services towards the spatial documentation of monuments in Bagan in response to the destruction of monuments by an earthquake in August 2016. After reconnaissance visit to Bagan and a subsequent meeting at the UNESCO offices in Bangkok in February 2017, the Zamani Project documented 12 monuments in Bagan, during 3 field campaigns between 2017 and 2018, including the Gubyaukgyi (Kubyauk-gyi) Temple (298).

The other 11 monuments documented by the Zamani Project are; Kyauk-ku-umin (154); Tha-peik-hmauk-gu-hpaya (744); Sula-mani-gu-hpaya (Sulamani)(748) Monument 1053; Sein-nyet-ama (1085); Sein-nyet-nyima (1086); Naga-yon-hpaya (1192); Loka-ok-shaung (1467); Than-daw-kya (1592); Ananda Monastery; and the City Gate of old Bagan (Tharabha Gate).

Textured 3D models, panorama tours, elevations, sections and plans of some of those structures are available on www.zamaniproject.org.

A video of the textured 3D model of the Kubyaub-gyi Temple was also created.

== Murals ==
=== Jātakas ===
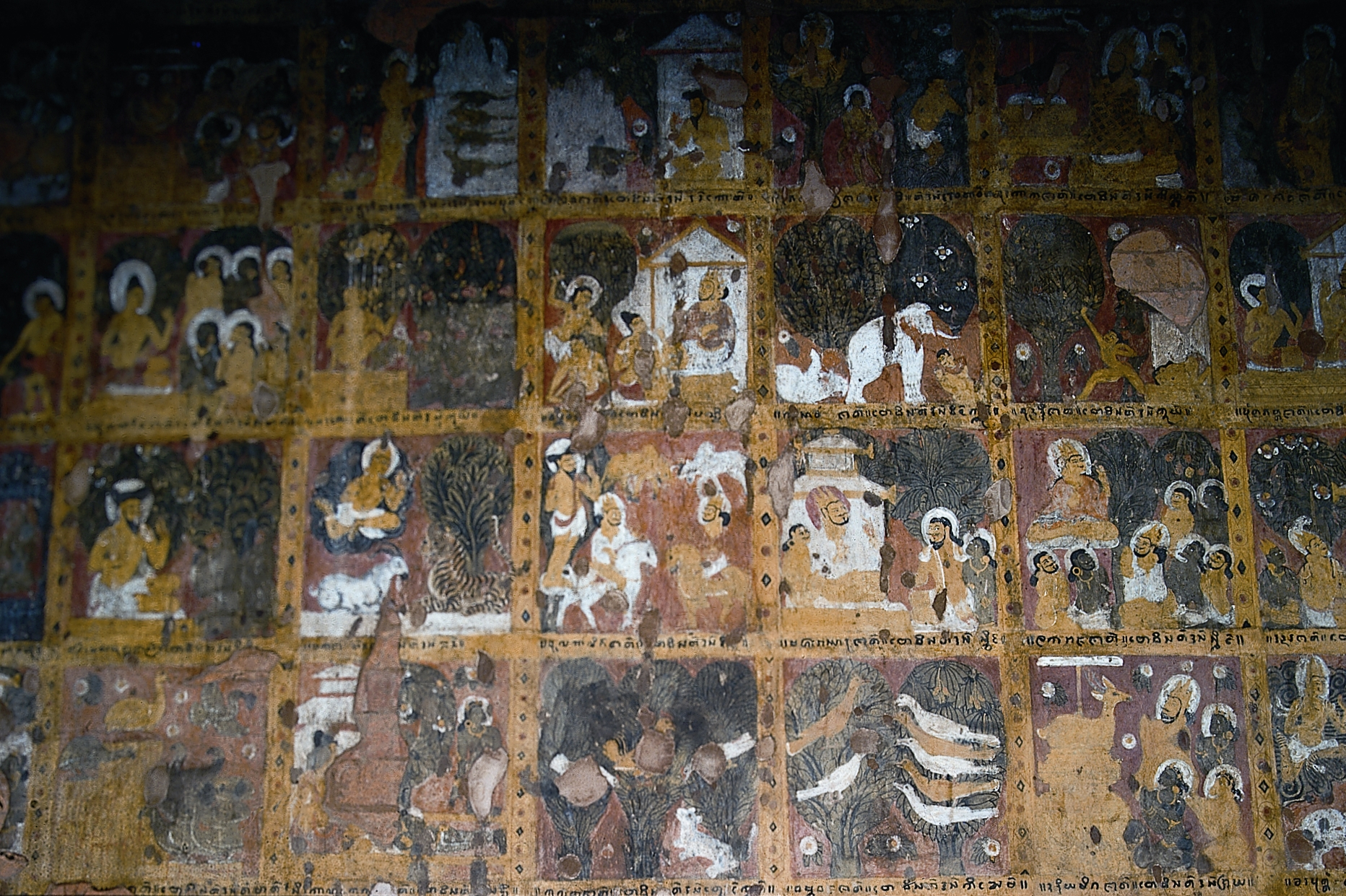
Jātaka Murals

The Gubyaukgyi temple has 547 well-preserved paintings depicting various Jātakas originated entirely from Sri Lanka depicting the island's historical chronicles - Mahavensa. Temple built in 1113 by Prince Rajakumar, son of King Kyansittha who painted a large number of episodes from the Mahavamsa on the Gubyaukgyi temple walls. These include panels depicting Arahant Mahinda, and King Devanmpiyatissa, the national hero Dutugamunu and his elephant Kandula as well as Prince Gamini sending women's attire to his father for refusing to fight for the freedom of the country. The invader Elara is depicted in true Mahavamsa style as a just and fair king. His bell of justice is shown together with the calf that wore it - a story known to every child in contemporary Sri Lanka. Sri Lanka's historical events depicted on the walls end with the great Sri Lankan King Vijayabahu - the contemporary of Rajakumar. Among them the stories of Buddha's previous lives as seen by Sri Lankans at that time. Each of these paintings has an ink caption written in Old Mon; in fact, Gubyaukgyi's murals with their accompanying captions are the most complete collection of Jātakas in Old Mon in the world. Each panel in the mural measures 1' 5" by 1' 5". The Jātaka panels begin on the third row of paintings on the eastern, outer wall of the vestibule, to one's immediate left as one enters the temple's entrance (the left as one enters). They then wrap around (south to west to north to east) seven times, ending on the ninth row of paintings on the outer wall. Unlike Jātaka paintings seen in other Bagan temples, such as the Ananda Temple, Gubyaukgyi's are unnumbered; the paintings' good condition and detailed captions have made identification simple, however.

=== Bengali Influence on Textiles in Temple Paintings ===
One of King Kyansittha's wives, Abeyadana, is believed to have originated from Pattikera, a region in the Comilla district of southeast Bengal. As such it is likely that the king developed diplomatic relations with the region around the end of the 11th and the beginning of the 12th centuries. A further sign that there was a cultural exchange between the Pagan Empire and east India/Bengal at the time is that most late 11th and early 12th century temples in Bagan have Bihar or Bengal style painting. One way that stylistic motifs entered Bagan was through textile imports. These textiles were used not just for garments, but also were used for Buddhist shrines.

The patterns seen on the textiles depicted in Gubyaukgyi's murals show Bengali influence. Textiles can be found in the temple's paintings in multiple contexts: on cushions Buddha is leaning on, in the form of fabrics spread below Buddha's throne, in pavilions under which Buddha is seated, and as garments worn by disciplines of Buddha.

Scholar Claudine Bautze-Picron has found three primary similarities between the stylistic motifs on textiles in Gubyaukgyi's paintings and those popular in contemporaneous Bengal. First is prominent use of repeated patterns of geometric shapes, such as circles, squares, diamonds, and hexagons, which can be seen in the garb of some of Buddha's royal disciples. The second similarity is striped patterns, especially around deities' legs. Finally, textiles seen in the temple's murals use the motif of scrolls extended like arabesques into repeated circles.
