= Areindama =

Spear in Burmese legend

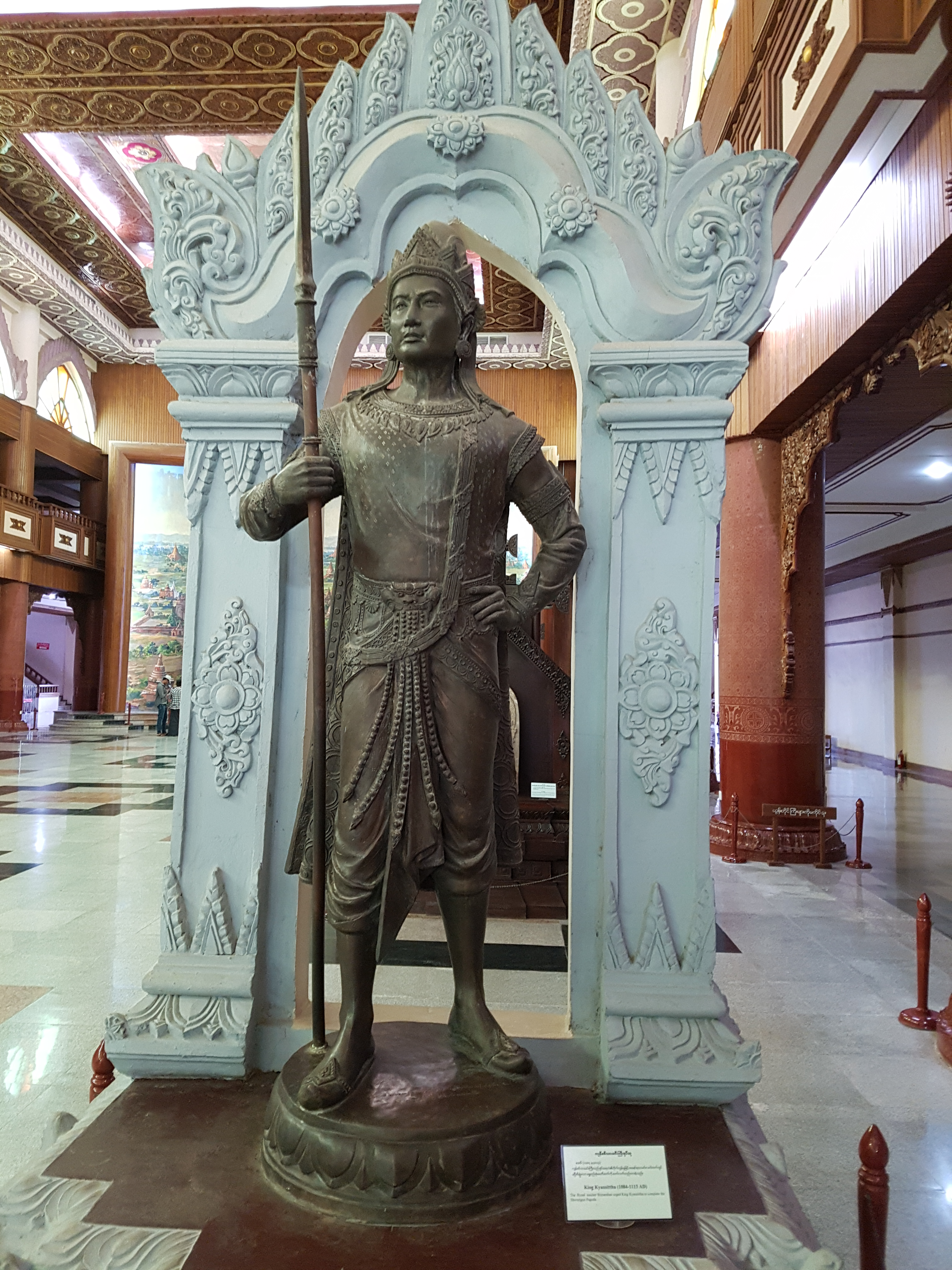
Statue of King Kyansittha holding the Areindama spear.

Areindama (Burmese: အရိန္ဒမာ, also spelt Arindama) is a legendary spear associated with several powerful Burmese kings. While statues and surviving narratives suggest that the spear may have had a historical basis, its exact nature remains shrouded in legend. It is often described in Burmese legends as a weapon of divine origin, imbued with supernatural powers.

== Legends and historical records ==
=== Origin ===
According to legend, the Areindama spear is said to have originally belonged to King Vandatusetkya (ဗန္ဓာတုစကြမင်း), an ancient monarch who ruled the region of Kambawasa, which is now part of central-southern India. It was a divine iron four-edged dagger, regarded as a sacred royal treasure. The divine dagger was broken into two parts and discarded by the god Pansathikha. One of the broken parts sank into the Pondokambala stone throne of Thagyamin, the king of the gods. Later, Thagyamin retrieved the fragment and attached it to a black teak wood handle, fashioning it into a spear.

=== Sri Ksetra era ===
Thagyamin first bestowed the spear upon Duttabaung, the great king who founded the kingdom of Sri Ksetra. It was he who had been granted the throne by Thagyamin. King Duttabaung used the Areindama spear as an instrument of royal authority in the collection of taxes from villages that delayed their payments. Royal decrees were reportedly attached to the spear and sent out as a symbol of enforcement. The spear's symbolic power was said to be so great that even the Naga Kingdom was compelled to pay tribute when it was dispatched. The Areindama spear is believed to have significantly contributed to Duttabaung's spiritual prestige and political influence. After King Duttabaung died, the minister Ngaye Kyar (lit. "Hell Tiger") took the Areindama spear and departed for the Tagaung Kingdom.

The Areindama spear disappeared for six generations following the reign of King Duttabaung, with no known record of it being held by subsequent monarchs. It was eventually recovered during the reign of King Sirisena, who launched a military campaign to Tagaung with the aid of a hunter who helped retrieve the sacred weapon. After King Sirisena's death, the spear was inherited by his son, Siriyit. However, it later came into the possession of Ngataba Min, a powerful general who, despite not being of royal blood, was adopted into the royal family and ascended the throne. Upon Ngatapa Min's death, his son Papiyan succeeded him and inherited the spear. During Papiyan's reign, the royal palace was destroyed by fire, and the Areindama spear was once again lost.

=== Pagan era ===
The spear is said to have reemerged during the Early Pagan period when Thagyamin descended to Earth to witness the selection of a new monarch. According to the royal chronicle Maha Yazawin by U Kala, Thagyamin encountered Kunhsaw Kyaunghpyu, who had also arrived to observe the event, and bestowed upon him a divine horse and a spear. This act was believed to fulfill an ancient prophecy that foretold Kunhsaw Kyaunghpyu would one day become the rightful king. In accordance with the prophecy, he eventually ascended to the throne. The spear was passed down to his son, Anawrahta, who used its power to unite the surrounding small kingdoms and establish what is now recognized as the first Burmese Kingdom.

During one of Anawrahta's conquests, his son Kyansittha was assigned to escort the tribute princess Manisanda to the palace. However, the two fell in love along the way, angering the king. In a trial, Anawrahta hurled his unerring spear at the bound prince, but it struck only the ropes, setting him free.

The Burmese chronicles report his exile with a touch of literary flourish. Kyansittha was brought bound into the presence, and Anawrahta taunted him for a time until with his anger rising, he hurled his fairy spear Areindama. But Kyansittha's hour had not yet come. The spear missed, grazing his skin and severing the ropes that bound him. He picked up the famous spear and fled never to return. His flight over hill and dale still forms a favorite subject of Burmese theater.

Kyansittha fled with the spear and lived in exile, returning only after Anawrahta's death to rescue his captured half-brother, Sawlu. He ultimately ascended the throne in 1084 CE. His reign ushered in the golden age of Pagan, and the spear became an enduring symbol of his legacy, with traditional depictions often portraying him wielding it.

The fate of the spear following Kyansittha's death is uncertain. Some traditions hold that it was passed down to his successors, beginning with his grandson Alaungsithu. Other legends claim that Thagyamin reclaimed the divine weapon upon Kyansittha's death. Yet another account suggests that Kyansittha enshrined the spear as a sacred relic in the Shwesayan Pagoda.

=== Konbaung era ===
The Areindama spear faded into obscurity before reemerging during the Konbaung dynasty. The spear is believed to have belonged to King Alaungpaya, founder of the dynasty, as some royal decrees reference acquiring a weapon called the "Areindama Golden Spiked Spear" (အရိန္ဒမာစကြာရွှေလှံ). In a historically significant proclamation dated 9 April 1756, King Alaungpaya issued a royal decree framed as a letter from Sakka (Thagyamin), the king of the gods. The document contains a remarkable passage:

(In Burmese): "ငါ့ကိုလည်း ဘုရားသခင် ပရိနိဗ္ဗာန် ယူတော်မူခါနီး၌ သာသနာတော်မြတ်ကို စောင်မရမည် အမိန့်တော်ရှိ၍ ကုန်းဘောင်ပြည်မင်းကို ငါ စောင်မရသည်။ ဆင်ဖြူလည်း ၅ စီး ငါပေးပြီ။ အရိန္ဒမာလှံလည်း ငါ အပ်ပြီ"

(Translation): "As the Buddha entrusted me with the duty of protecting the sacred Dhamma before his parinirvana, so now must I safeguard the King of Konbaung. I have bestowed five white elephants, and I now confer upon him the Areindama spear as well."

— A letter from Sakka

However, historical records do not detail how Alaungpaya utilized this legendary spear in his military campaigns.

The Areindama spear resurfaced during the reign of King Thibaw. According to the royal chronicle Maha Yazawin, the spear was discovered during excavations at the Kuthodaw Pwar pond in Hanlin and was ceremoniously presented to the king on 27 February 1879. However, modern historians regard this account as a fabrication. The story originated from a monk named U Pho, who claimed to know the spear's location, prompting a royal search. When no spear was found, U Pho allegedly buried a broken spear fragment to avoid suspicion. Most scholars now agree that the "Areindama spear" reportedly discovered during King Thibaw's reign was in fact a planted fragment, rather than the legendary weapon itself.

== Description and power ==
Despite its legendary status, no reliable historical records provide concrete descriptions of the spear's physical form. Details such as its size, weight, materials, or exact design remain undocumented. This lack of verifiable evidence has led some scholars to question whether the Areindama spear was a real weapon representing divine favor and royal legitimacy. Some propose that it functioned more as a literary motif or embellishment in royal chronicles and legends than as a historical weapon.

According to legend, Kyansittha wielded the power of the Areindama spear to leap effortlessly across wide rivers and streams. On one occasion, frustrated by his inability to plant the spear into the ground, he hurled it into a nearby ravine—unwittingly striking and killing assassins who had been lying in wait.

The spear is said to have the power to make sour limes taste sweet when struck with it. One account relates that when the fugitive prince Kyansittha reached Parinma (a village in Myaung on the banks of the Chindwin River that still exists today), he sought refuge in a monastery. Exhausted from fleeing execution, he noticed a lime tree in the monastery courtyard, heavy with ripe fruit. The sight of the limes was irresistible to the weary prince, and he asked the abbot for permission to eat them. The abbot warned him, "These limes are far too sour—no one can eat them." But Kyansittha, undeterred, pleaded until the monk finally relented.

Using his spear, Kyansittha knocked down the limes and devoured them eagerly. The abbot watched in disbelief—he knew these limes were famously bitter, yet Kyansittha ate them with relish. Then Kyansittha offered some to the abbot, who at first refused. But after much insistence, the monk took a small bite—and to his shock, the lime was sweet. From that moment, the abbot couldn't resist and kept saying, "Maung Kyan, just one more!" (မောင်ကျန်တစ်တို့). This phrase became a popular Burmese proverb, still used today when someone enjoys something so much they keep asking for more. The tale has been passed down through generations and remains widely told to this day.

== Areindama Cane ==
There was also a divine treasure known as the Areindama Cane, which was bestowed by Thagyamin upon King Duttabaung, along with the Areindama Spear and other celestial weapons. According to traditional beliefs, the Areindama Cane was said to physically strike and subdue supernatural beings and nats, making it a feared and revered object. King Anawrahta wielded this cane not only as a weapon but also as a symbol of authority—commanding even powerful spirits to bow before its holder.

According to royal chronicles, when Anawrahta arrived in the Shan state of Maw, the Sawbwa of the nine provinces of Maw, welcomed him with a ceremonial display of five golden mats as a gesture of respect. However, rather than accepting the tribute, Anawrahta struck the mats with Areindama Cane. As a result, the mats reportedly stacked themselves into a single pile.

The Areindama Cane is associated with the death of King Anawrahta. The chronicles state that while Anawrahta was marching toward China, the spirit of a Leinpin tree (Terminalia pyrifolia) manifested in the tree and refused to descend before the king. Offended by this act of defiance, Anawrahta ordered Kyansittha to strike the spirit with the Areindama Cane. Unable to withstand the cane's supernatural power, the spirit leapt down in fear and fled. Humiliated, it later plotted revenge. Disguised as a buffalo—or, in some versions, an ox—the spirit ambushed Anawrahta, ultimately leading to the king's untimely death.
