= Abeyadana Temple =

Buddhist temple in Mandalay Region, Myanmar

Abeyadana temple
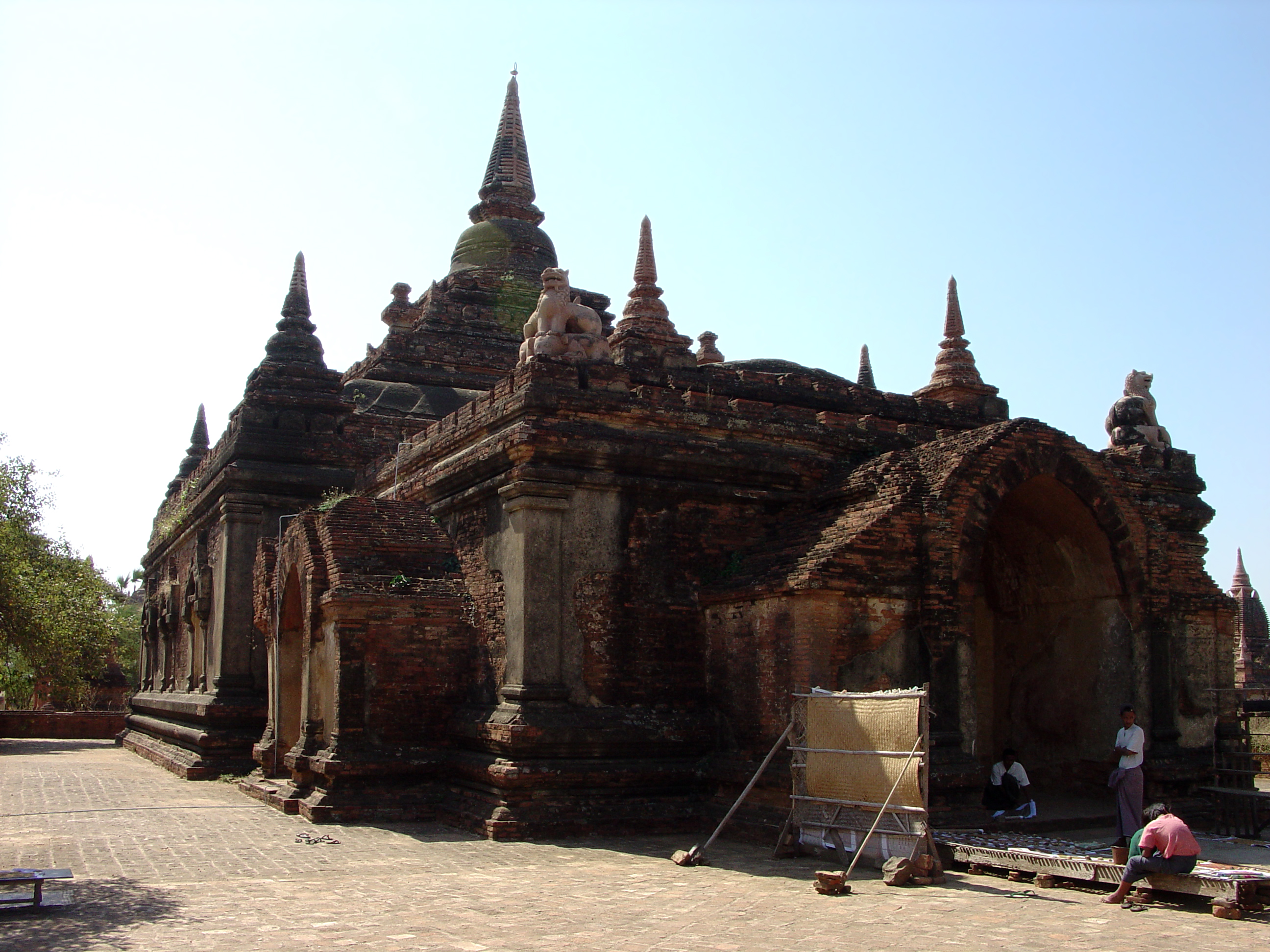
- Abeyadana temple in 2014

- Location in Burma

Religion
- Affiliation: Buddhism
- Deity: Gautama Buddha
- Patron: Abeyadana

Location
- Location: Bagan
- Country: Myanmar
- Coordinates: 21.148934°N 94.857674°E

Architecture
- Established: c. 1094 CE

Abeyadana temple is a 12th century CE Buddhist temple in Bagan, Myanmar. The temple complex has a large central temple, which has a rectangular plan.

== History ==
The temple was built around 1090 CE, during the reign of king Kyanzittha. A later ink inscription on the temple walls attributes its construction to Kyanzittha's queen Abeyadana.

A local legend states that the temple was built at the place where Abeyadana waited for Kyanzittha. According to G.H. Luce and Ba Shin, Abeyadana came from the Pattikera kingdom located in the eastern part of the Indian subcontinent (around present-day Comilla District in Bangladesh). The murals in the temple are of east Indian (Pala) style, and were probably created by artists from eastern India.

== Paintings ==
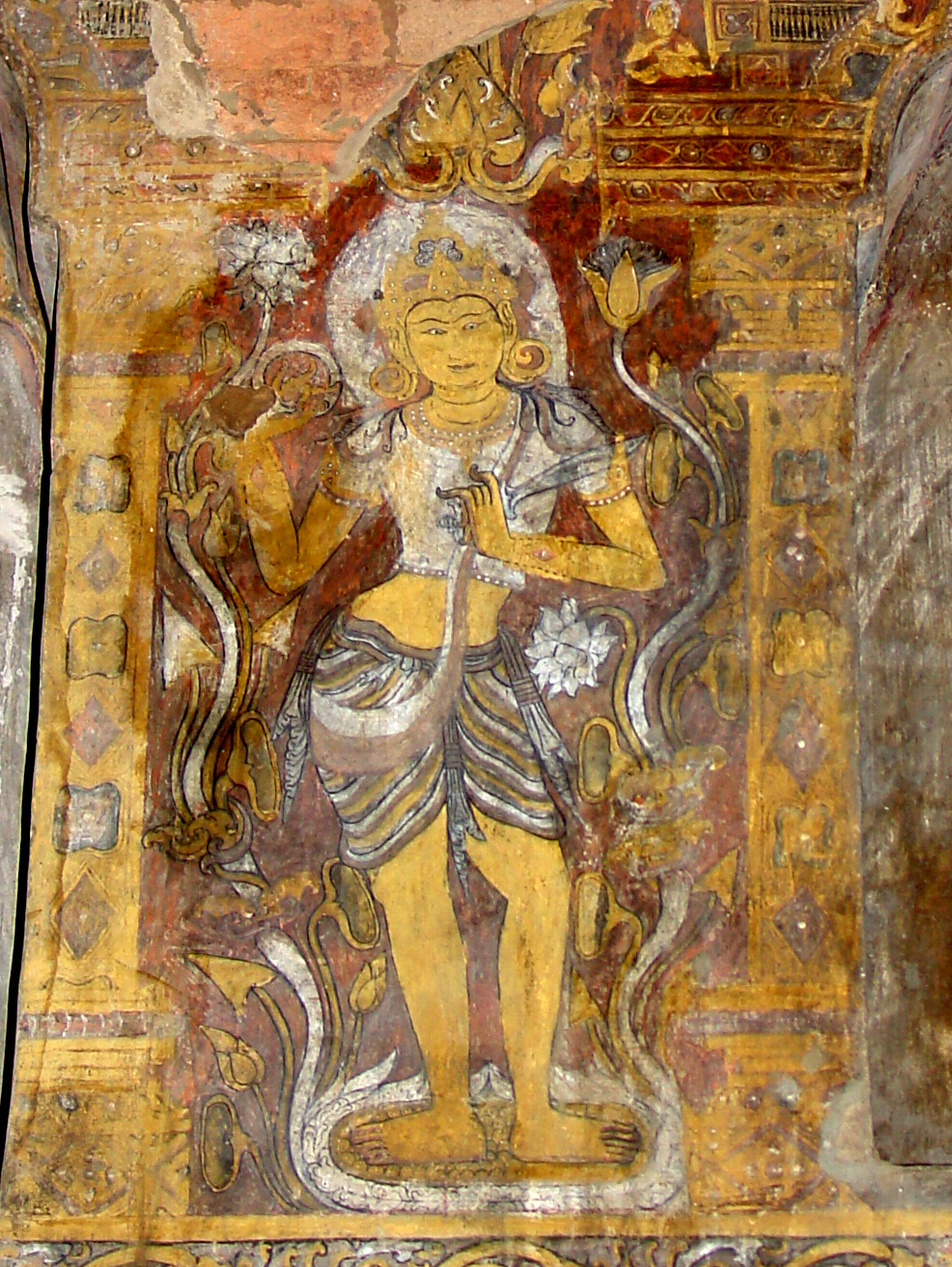
Bodhisattva painting in Abeyadana temple

The main idol of the temple is a brick image of Gautama Buddha. On the west side of the Buddha image, a portrait-figure shows Abeydana praying to him. The north side of the entrance hall features eight rows of Jataka frescos, with titles in Pali language and descriptions in Mon language (and often, the number of the Jataka tale). A subsidiary panel shows the Buddha delivering his first sermon (the Dhammacakkappavattana Sutta). He is sitting cross-legged on a lotus throne, with his hands in Dharmachakra mudra pose. He is surrounded by people paying obeisance to him: two celestial beings showering lotus flowers at the top, and two kings at the bottom. There is also an image of the goddess Tara, who is shown with a curvy body, dressed in royal attire. There is a padma lotus to her left, and a blue lotus to her right. These flowers are said to signify her purity.

Besides the orthodox Buddhist frescos, the temple walls also feature Tantric and Brahmanic elements. The inner walls of the temple feature frescos of Hindu gods such as Brahma, Vishnu, Shiva and Indra. In addition, there are paintings of deities specific to Burmese Buddhism, such as that of a cross-legged goddess.
