= Ngataba Min =

King of Sri Ksetra Kingdom from 110 to 59 BCE

- King of Sri Ksetra Kingdom
- Reign: 110 BCE – 59 BCE
- Predecessor: Sriyit
- Successor: Papiyan
- Born: c. 125 BCE; Sri Ksetra Kingdom
- Died: 59 BCE
- Spouse: Daughter of King Sriyit
- Issue: Papiyan
- Religion: Buddhism

Ngataba Min (Burmese: ငတပါးမင်း) was the 12th king of the first Sri Ksetra Kingdom. According to the royal chronicles, he ascended the throne in 110 BCE and, though not of royal lineage, was said to have gained kingship after consuming the head of a divine rooster.

== Reign ==
Several Burmese royal chronicles record the reign of Ngataba Min, including U Kala's Yazawin Choke (Compendium of Royal Chronicles) and Thakin Kodaw Hmaing's New Hmannan Yazawin. Among these, the New Hmannan Yazawin provides a more detailed account of his life and reign. The future king was born around 125 BCE, and the son of a commoner from the Sri Ksetra Kingdom. At a young age, his father entrusted him to a monk, and he became a novice. The monk taught him the Tripitaka and astrology until he was proficient. The novice, in turn, served and attended to his teacher, the monk with great devotion.

One day, the rooster raised by the monk began to crow, "Eat my head and you shall become a great king." The monk, realizing that this animal was crowing about such a matter, called the young novice and said, "Young novice, because this rooster crows about unusual and strange things, cook this rooster and offer it to me." The young novice cooked the rooster, and when he was taking it out of the pot, the rooster's head fell onto the ground. The novice did not offer it to the monk; instead, he washed the rooster's head and ate it himself. When the monk asked why the rooster's head was missing, the novice explained that it had fallen to the ground and, being unclean, he had eaten it himself. The monk, wishing to see whether the rooster's crowing had been a true omen, taught the young novice various religious doctrines and Dhammathats (legal treatises) before allowing him to leave the monkhood. He then entrusted the boy to a general, who adopted him as his son and took him along wherever he went.

Upon being presented at the royal palace, King Sriyit observed that the young man's conduct was impeccable and that he was endowed with the qualities of a ruler. The king was greatly pleased, and as he had no son of his own, he asked the general for the young man and adopted him. Subsequently, the young man demonstrated exceptional wisdom and skill in matters of royal protocol and state administration. He served his adoptive father, the king, with great humility and respect. As a result, he became beloved by the king, and the officials. Recognizing his capabilities, the king appointed the young man as Crown Prince and heir to the throne.

At the age of 15, following the death of his father, the young man ascended the throne in 110 BCE. Because he was not a descendant of the ruling Duttabaung dynasty, historians refer to him as Ngataba Min (meaning "King from Another Lineage" or "Outsider King"). He married a daughter of the former king, and they had a son named Prince Papiyan.

In 85 BCE, King Ngataba expanded his kingdom and founded a city in the region of Mahavana. As he succeeded in establishing the city where none before him had been able to do so, it was named Malun. Although not of the bloodline of King Duttabaung, he was nevertheless a righteous ruler who was able to wield the divine spear Arindama.

King Ngataba was a devout Buddhist and commissioned the construction of several pagodas, including the Kyatgaungser Pagoda (lit. 'Rooster Head-Eating Pagoda') and the Yadana Puhtogyi Pagoda. It is said that when the Yadana Puhtogyi Pagoda was completed, and the king performed the water-libation ceremony to share the merit, the earth trembled. During his reign, five hundred arahants arrived from Laṅkādvīpa to promote and spread the teachings of the Buddha. The king welcomed them with great devotion and recognized the five hundred Arahants as his royal teachers.

King Ngataba was renowned for upholding the ten duties of a king and was remembered by chroniclers as a righteous and virtuous ruler. He reigned for 51 years and died at the age of 66, in 59 BCE. According to legend, when the king died, two suns rose in the sky, and the roosters across the land crowed together until the sun reached its zenith. After his passing, his son, Prince Papiyan, succeeded him on the throne.

== Legacy ==
A king who is not descended from a royal lineage but rises to the throne is often referred to by historians as a "Ngataba Min". In Burmese history, such as Kyansittha, Razadarit, Binnya Dala, and Alaungpaya are cited as prominent examples of "Ngataba Mins".
