= Kho Nan Shin =

Buddhist temple in Mandalay, Myanmar

Kho Nan Shin (ခိုနန်းရှင်) is a Buddhist cave temple located in Magyee In Village, Patheingyi Township, Mandalay, Myanmar. Situated on the eastern bank of the Dokhtawaddy River, located inside a large mountain, it is a naturally formed cave temple. Inside this cave, many pagodas can be found, including those from the Pagan era. It is said that these pagodas were built by Crown Prince Min Shin Saw of Pagan, who also used the cave for religious activities. Stone inscriptions found within some of the pagodas indicate that they were established by Saopha Sao Kya Ohn, the grandfather of Saw Mon Hla, the principal queen of King Anawrahta of Pagan. According to legend, the pagoda is guarded by the Thaik nan shin, the spirits assigned to protect the treasures of the future Buddha. These spirits dislike the number nine and forbid entry to the cave by groups of nine people.
