= Sawlumin inscription =

Burmese stone inscription

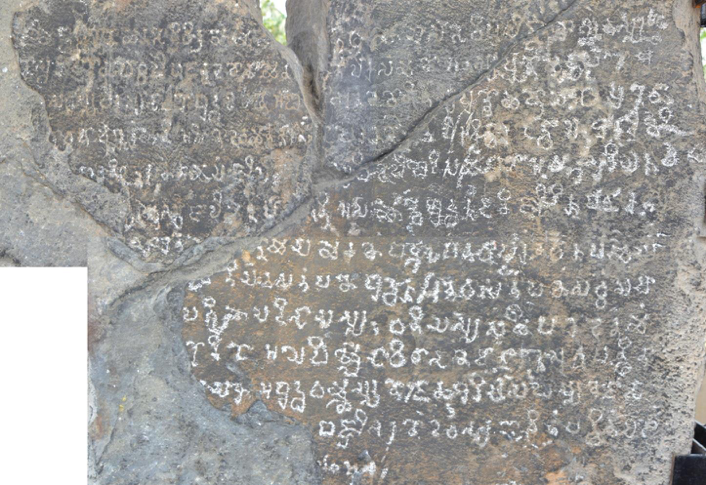
- Material: Stone
- Size: 1.75 metres (5.7 ft) x 1.06 metres (3.5 ft)
- Writing: Mon-Burmese script
- Created: November/December 1079; Pyatho 441 ME
- Discovered: 17 November 2013 (first 3 fragments); 27 November 2013 (4th fragment)
- Present location: Myittha, Myanmar

The Sawlumin inscription (Burmese: စောလူးမင်း ကျောက်စာ [sɔ́lúmɪ́ɴ tɕaʊʔ sà]) is one of the oldest surviving stone inscriptions in Myanmar. The slabs were mainly inscribed in Burmese, Pyu, Mon and Pali, and a few lines in Sanskrit. According to an early analysis, the stele was founded in 1079 by King Saw Lu of Pagan (Bagan).

== Discovery ==
Three broken slabs of the inscription were discovered in Myittha Township, Mandalay Region on 17 November 2013 and a fourth piece was found on 27 November 2013. A fifth piece is still missing. The found four pieces were rejoined and currently stands in Petaw monastery. The slab size is 1.75 metres (5.7 ft) in height, and 1.06 metres (3.5 ft) in breadth.

== Initial analyses ==
The initial readings of the slabs threatened to upend the current understanding of Pagan-era dates. The initial reports claimed that King Saw Lu founded the inscription. They contained the year 415 ME (1053/54 CE), presumably as its inscription date. Moreover, the initial reports conjectured that the fifth script might be Tai-Yuan, Gon (Khun or Kengtung) Shan, over two centuries earlier than the earliest known evidence of a Tai-Shan script.

However, at least one subsequent analysis does not agree with some of the initial readings. According to Bee Htaw Monzel, the slabs were indeed founded by Saw Lu and mainly inscribed in Mon, Pyu and Pali, and a few lines of Sanskrit. His analysis finds that the Mon and Pyu versions state 441 as the year of inscription, and that the Pyu version also gives the 10th month and the 3rd day.

Bee Htaw Monzel's translation of the extant inscriptions can be summarized as:

- King Saw Lu reconstructed the recently ravaged pagoda in Myittha, which was originally built by his grandfather;
- The king dedicated the reconstructed pagoda on Wednesday, full moon of Pyatho 441 ME (unexplained translation of year 441, 10th month, 3rd day); (Note: It is unclear how Bee Htaw Monzel (Bee Htaw Monzel 2014: 21) came up with Wednesday, full moon of Pyatho 441 ME from his own reading of year 441, 10th month, 3rd day. His analysis does not explain where he got the full moon day or how the 3rd day could be translated as Wednesday. At any rate, the full moon of Pyatho 441 ME would have been Monday, 9 December 1079. If the 3rd day were read as the 3rd day of the month, the date would be the 3rd waxing of Pyatho 441 ME (Wednesday, 27 November 1079).)
- The king donated a statue of the Buddha in the size of the king's own body along with 10 persons, oxen and paddy fields to care for the pagoda

== Significance ==
Whether the inscription was inscribed in 1079 CE (or 1052 as initially reported), if the readings are confirmed, the inscription appears to be the earliest evidence of the Mon-Burmese script. (The currently accepted date of the earliest Burmese-Mon is 1093 CE.)

Furthermore, the initial reading of 415 ME (25 March 1053 to 25 March 1054 CE) as the date of the inscription's foundation would have upended the current understanding of the early Pagan period.

- If 1053/54 proves to be the inscription date, it would be:

1. One of the earliest extant inscriptions of the Burmese alphabet. Its inscription date would be 60 years earlier than the Myazedi inscription (c. 1112/1113), one of the oldest known stone inscriptions in Burma (Myanmar). (The earliest known inscription of Burmese—the copper-gilt umbrella inscription of the Mahabodhi Temple in India—is dated to 1035 CE. According to a recast stone inscription from the late 18th century, the Burmese alphabet was already in use by 984 CE.)
2. The earliest instance of the Burma Mon script. The earliest evidence of the predecessor script to the modern Mon script is dated to 1093 CE. (The Mon script of Dvaravati or Haripunjaya (both in present-day Thailand) is presumably earlier than the 11th century but so far there is no evidence to prove any linkage between the two Mon scripts.)

- If 1053/54 proves to be the inscription date, and if it was inscribed during Saw Lu's reign as king, it would mean that:

1. King Saw Lu was already reigning in 1053/1054 as opposed to the currently accepted reign date of 1077/78–1084.
2. The Myazedi inscription and most of the Burmese chronicles are incorrect about the chronology of early Pagan kings. Only the Maha Yazawin chronicle, which says Saw Lu reigned between 1035 and 1061, would be correct with respect to Saw Lu's reign. Currently, mainstream scholarship accepts Zatadawbon Yazawin's dates, which agree with Myazedi's dates, as the most authoritative chronicle for the early Pagan period chronology. (Note: (Maha Yazawin 2006: 346–349): Among the four major chronicles, only Zatadawbon Yazawin's dates line up with Anawrahta's inscriptionally verified accession date of 1044 CE. (Aung-Thwin 2005: 121–123): In general, Zata is considered "the most accurate of all Burmese chronicles, particularly with regard to the best-known Pagan and Ava kings, many of whose dates have been corroborated by epigraphy.")

- If the fifth script, currently speculated as the Tai-Yuan, Gon (Khun or Kengtung) Shan or an early Nāgarī script, is confirmed to be an early form of Tai-Shan script,

1. it would be the oldest, Tai/Shan script, predating the Thai script, believed to be derived from Khmer in 1293, by over 240 years. Moreover, it would mean the Tai-Yuan or the Gon/Khun script existed 240 years prior to the founding of the Lan Na kingdom in 1292. Most of the Shan scripts came into existence in the late 16th century only.
2. the Tai/Shan speakers were sufficiently prominent in the early Pagan period that their script was used in a royal inscription. This contradicts the current understanding that Shan speakers moved in en masse to Kachin and Shan hills only in the mid-to-late 13th century.
3. Burmese and northern Thai chronicles' claim that Anawrahta's realm encompassed Kengtung and Chiang Mai regions could be reconsidered. (Both Chiang Mai and Chaing Saen chronicles say their rulers paid tribute to Anawrahta, the father of Saw Lu. But the claims of the chronicles, which were written centuries after Anawrahta's time, are not accepted by mainstream scholarship.)

== Current status ==
As of April 2014, about 60 percent of the tablets had been deciphered. They have deciphered all of the Mon and Pali text and about 10 percent of Pyu. A copy of text in the Nagari writing system used in northern India and Nepal has been sent to the Archaeological Survey of India for deciphering. The Indian department replies that the inscription is not preserved in better condition. Some letters are peeled off and some are worn out. Only few letters in lines 6 and 7 are well preserved. The Indian department reveals that the inscription is engraved in early Nagari characters, retaining some of the features of Siddhamatrika or Kutila scripts.

What has been translated so far describes the donation of a monastery, Maha Anuruda Deva Rama, by King Saw Lu and his wife Manicanda.

== Bibliography ==
- Aung-Thwin, Michael (2005). The mists of Rāmañña: The Legend that was Lower Burma (illustrated ed.). Honolulu: University of Hawai'i Press. ISBN 9780824828868.
- Lieberman, Victor B. (2003). Strange Parallels: Southeast Asia in Global Context, c. 800–1830, volume 1, Integration on the Mainland. Cambridge University Press. ISBN 978-0-521-80496-7.
- Oriental Institute; East India Association (1900). The Imperial and Asiatic Quarterly Review and Oriental and Colonial Record. London and Working, England: Oriental Institute.
- Bee Htaw Monzel, Nai (2014). "Myittha Slab Inscription of King Sawlu (Bajrâbhara ṇadeva)".
