= Saw Yun of Pagan =

Saw Yun of Pagan စောယွန်း

King Father of Pagan
- Reign: c.1112
- Born: c. 1070; Pagan
- Died: Pagan
- Consort: Shwe Einthi
- Issue: Sithu I
- House: Pagan
- Father: Saw Lu
- Mother: Usaukpan
- Religion: Theravada Buddhism

Saw Yun (Burmese: စောယွန်း, pronounced [sɔ́ jʊ́ɴ]) was the only son of King Saw Lu of Pagan, and the father of King Sithu I. He was married to Princess Shwe Einthi, daughter of King Kyansittha.

== Bibliography ==
- Harvey, G. E. (1925). History of Burma: From the Earliest Times to 10 March 1824. London: Frank Cass & Co. Ltd.
