= Yazakumar =

Yazakumar ရာဇကုမာရ်
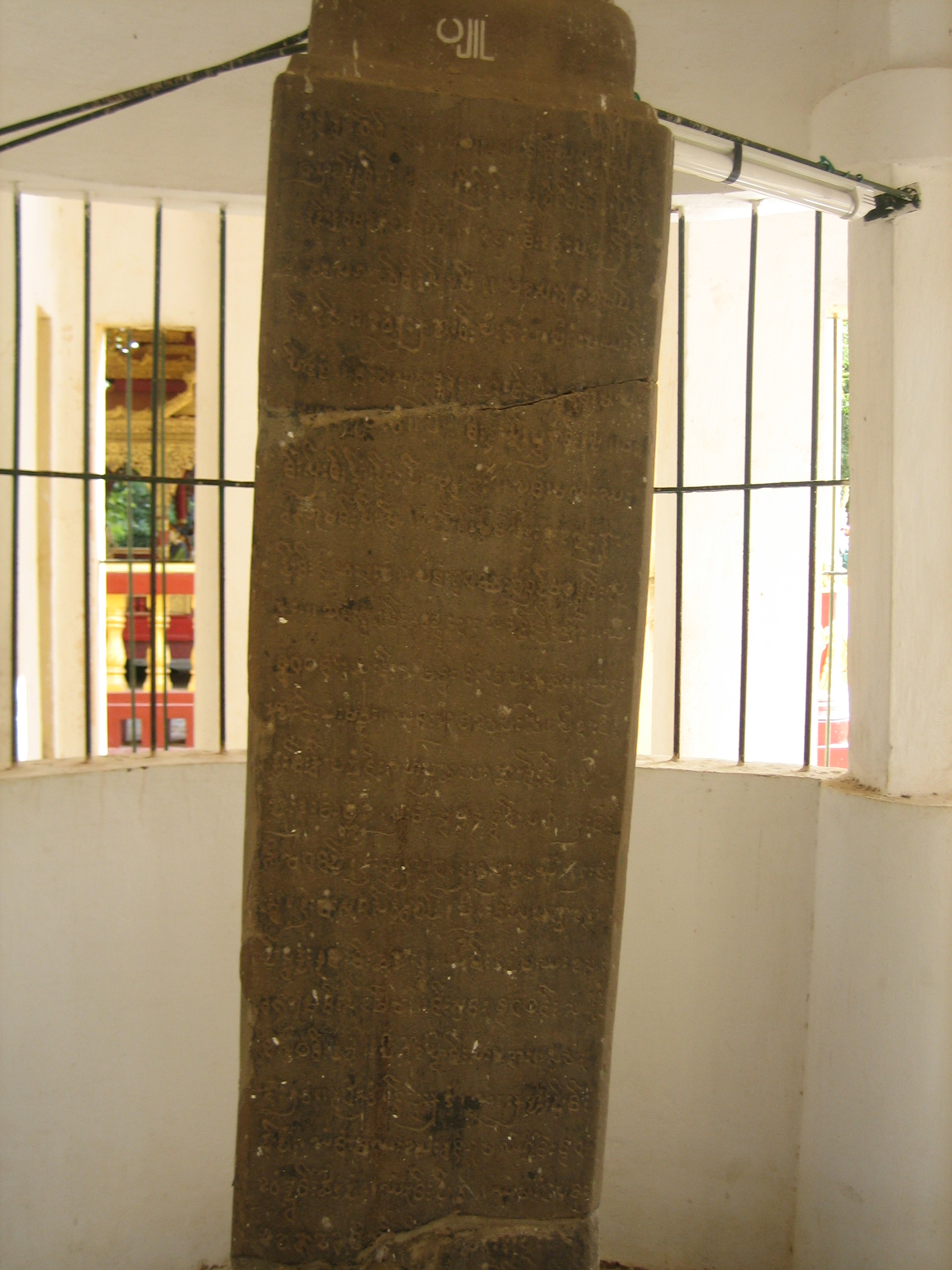
- The Myazedi Inscription (Pyu facet)

Titular Governor of Dhanyawadi
- Reign: c. 1091–1113
- Born: 1078; Kyaungbyu (Sagaing Region)
- Died: Unknown; Pagan
- House: Pagan
- Father: Kyansittha
- Mother: Thanbula
- Religion: Theravada Buddhism

Yazakumar (Burmese: ရာဇကုမာရ် [jàza̰ kòʊɰ̃mà]; Pali: Rājakumāra; 1078–11??) was the titular governor of north Arakan during the reign of his father King Kyansittha of the Pagan Dynasty of Myanmar (Burma). He is best known for the Myazedi inscription of 1113, which he donated in his father's honor. The stone inscription has scholarly significance because it allowed the deciphering of the Pyu language.

== Biography ==
=== Early life ===
Yazakumar was born to Thanbula and Kyansittha circa 1078 at Kyaungbyu. Kyansittha was a former general of the Pagan army who had been sent to exile by his father King Anawrahta for his affair with Anawrahta's young queen Manisanda. In 1077, Anawrahta died, and Kyansittha was recalled to the capital by Saw Lu to run the kingdom. Thanbula was pregnant with Yazakumar remained at Kyaungbyu. At Pagan, Kyansittha was sent into exile again—this time to Dala (modern Yangon) for renewing his affair with Manisanda.

In 1084, Kyansittha ascended to the Pagan throne but had forgotten about his wife and child at Kyaungbyu. When Thanbula found out that Kyansittha was king, she brought their son to Pagan, along with the ring that Kyansittha had given her as proof. The king was surprised to see them. Kyansittha had already word that his grandson Alaungsithu would be king because he thought he had no son. A remorseful Kyansittha made Yazakumar the titular head of north Arakan and seven hill districts.

=== Myazedi inscription ===
Though passed over for the throne, Yazakumar never showed any disappointment. He spent his life with donating his inheritance for his mother's merit. He donated many temples in honor of his parents. He commissioned the Myazedi inscription as his father lay dying in bed. The inscription dated 1113 was written in four languages: Pyu, Burmese, Mon, and Pali, which all tell the story of Yazakumar and his father Kyansittha. The primary importance of the Myazedi inscription is that it allowed for the deciphering of the written Pyu.
