= Agga Mahethi of Pagan =

Agga Mahethi of Pagan အဂ္ဂ မဟေသီ

Chief queen consort of Burma
- Tenure: 1048–1077
- Predecessor: Pyinsa Kalayani
- Successor: Usaukpan
- Born: c. 1020
- Died: c. 1077
- Spouse: Anawrahta
- Issue: Saw Lu
- House: Pagan
- Religion: Theravada Buddhism

Agga Mahethi (Burmese: အဂ္ဂ မဟေသီ, pronounced [ʔɛʔga̰ məhèθì]; Pali: Aggamahesī) was the empress consort and legal wife of King Anawrahta of Pagan (Bagan). She was also known as the Queen of Southern Palace ("Taung Pyinthe"). Her only child, Saw Lu, succeeded the Pagan throne after him.

== Bibliography ==
- Maha Sithu (2012) [1798]. Myint Swe; Kyaw Win; Thein Hlaing (eds.). Yazawin Thit (in Burmese). Vol. 1–3 (2nd printing ed.). Yangon: Ya-Pyei Publishing.

Agga Mahethi of Pagan Pagan Kingdom Born: c. 1015 Died: c. 1080s
Royal titles
Preceded by Pyinsa Kalayani	Chief queen consort of Burma; 1048–1077	Succeeded by Usaukpan
