= Shwe Einthi =

Shwe Einthi ရွှေအိမ်သည်

Queen Mother of Pagan
- Reign: c.1112
- Born: Early 1070s Pagan (Bagan)
- Died: Unknown; Pagan
- Spouse: Saw Yun of Pagan
- Issue: Soe Saing; Alaungsithu
- House: Pagan
- Father: Kyansittha
- Mother: Apeyadana
- Religion: Theravada Buddhism

Shwe Einthi (Burmese: ရွှေအိမ်သည်, pronounced [ʃwè ʔèiɰ̃ðɛ̀]; also Shwe Einsi, [ʃwè ʔèiɰ̃zì]) was a princess of Pagan Dynasty of Burma (Myanmar). She was the only daughter of King Kyansittha (r. 1084–1113), and queen mother of King Alaungsithu.

The princess is best remembered in Burmese history for her failed love affair with the prince of Paṭṭikera, a kingdom, believed to be in East Bengal or in eastern Chin Hills. Soon after her father became king in 1084, she fell in love with the prince who was visiting Bagan/Pagan. But her father forbade her to marry a foreigner, and instead married her off to Prince Saw Yun, the son of the late King Saw Lu. The primate of Pagan Shin Arahan broke the news to the prince, who subsequently committed suicide.

The princess had two children with Saw Yun: Soe Saing and Alaung Sotho, who succeeded Kyansittha.
