= Usaukpan (Sawlu) =

Usaukpan ဦးဆောက်ပန်း

Chief queen consort of Burma
- Tenure: 1077 - 1084
- Predecessor: Agga Mahethi
- Successor: Apeyadana
- Born: c. 1050s Pagan (Bagan)
- Died: 1084; Pagan
- Spouse: Saw Lu
- Issue: Saw Yun
- House: Pagan
- Religion: Theravada Buddhism

Usaukpan (Burmese: ဦးဆောက်ပန်း, pronounced [ʔú sʰauʔ páɴ]) was the chief queen consort of King Saw Lu of Pagan (Bagan). She was the paternal grandmother of King Sithu I.

== Bibliography ==
- Maha Sithu (2012) [1798]. Kyaw Win; Thein Hlaing (eds.). Yazawin Thit (in Burmese). Vol. 1–3 (2nd ed.). Yangon: Ya-Pyei Publishing.

Usaukpan (Sawlu) Pagan Kingdom Born: c. 1050s Died: 1077/78
Royal titles
Preceded by Agga Mahethi	Chief queen consort of Burma; 1077/78	Succeeded by Manisanda
