= Shwesayan Pagoda =

Buddhist temple in Myanmar

- Location within Myanmar

Religion
- Affiliation: Theravada Buddhism

Location
- Location: Patheingyi Township, Mandalay Region
- Country: Myanmar
- Coordinates: 21°50′24″N 96°12′50″E

Architecture
- Founder: Saw Mon Hla
- Groundbreaking: 11th century

Shwesayan Pagoda (Burmese: ရွှေစာရံ ဘုရား) is a Buddhist temple located in Patheingyi Township, 14 miles from Mandalay, Myanmar. Situated near the Dokhtawaddy River, it was built by Saw Mon Hla, one of the principal queens of King Anawrahta of Pagan.

The temple was significantly damaged on 28 March 2025 by the 2025 Myanmar earthquake.

== Legend ==
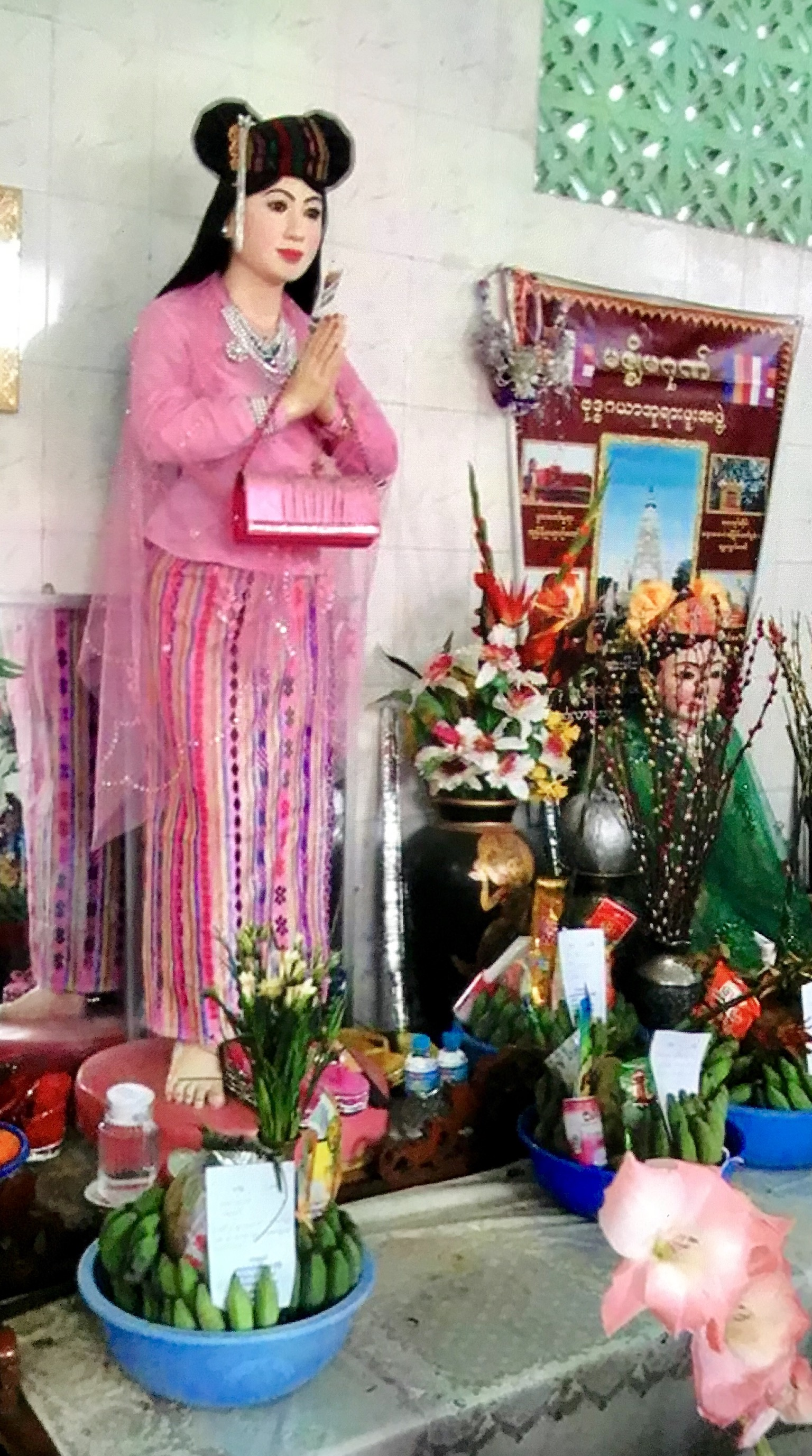
Saw Mon Hla statue in the pagoda

According to Burmese chronicles, Saw Mon Hla was driven out by her rival queens, who were jealous of her status as Anawrahta's favorite. Her rivals accused her of witchcraft, forcing Saw Mon Hla to leave Anawrahta and return to her homeland, Maw.

On her return to Sae Lant village, her birthplace in northern Maw Shan State, one of her earrings, which contained a relic of the Buddha, dropped into a stream. As it fell, dozens of golden sparrows appeared, circling the spot where the earring landed. The stream was later named "Na Daung Kya", meaning "the earring fell into". Saw Mon Hla built a pagoda near the riverbank (located in present-day Patheingyi Township, Mandalay), enshrining her earrings and the Buddha relic. The pagoda's façade faced east, toward her birthplace in Shan State. When King Anawrahta learned of this, he ordered his soldiers to kill her if the pagoda faced east, and to spare her life if it faced west, where Pagan was located.

Upon hearing the news, Saw Mon Hla made a solemn wish and used her emerald shawl to turn the pagoda so that it faced directly between east and west, in an attempt to save herself. According to legend, the soldiers set her free when they saw that the pagoda was not facing Shan State. The pagoda was named Shwesayan, meaning "surrounded by golden sparrows". Saw Mon Hla and her brother died at their home near Hsipaw and are believed to have become nats (spirits) who protect the Shwesayan Pagoda to this day. A small memorial palace near the pagoda features a statue of Saw Mon Hla and her brother. King Anawrahta, deeply regretful after banishing his queen and hearing of her death, donated the surrounding land to the pagoda near the end of his reign.

King Alaungsithu continued to donate fifty households, along with the village of Shwesayan, to care for the pagoda and perform both major and minor religious duties.

== Festival ==
The Shwesayan Pagoda Festival is held annually from the full moon day of Tabaung to the 10th waning moon (from 5 to 14 March). The Shwesayan Pagoda Festival gained widespread recognition in Myanmar, thanks to Sein Tin Han, who composed the festival's traditional song called "Htanywet Pahtee" (ထန်းရွက်ပုတီး, 'Palm Leaf Beads'), which was performed by Nyo Nyo San, an eminent Burmese classical singer. During the festival, records indicate that giant catfish and other large fish come to honor the pagoda. Visitors to the pagoda feed these fish as they swim in the nearby river and commonly decorate their heads with gold leaf.

== See also ==
- List of structures and infrastructure affected by the 2025 Myanmar earthquake
