= Paṭṭikera =

Early medieval Kingdom in Tripura

Kingdom of Paṭṭikera
- c. 1000–c. 1300
- Status: historical kingdom
- Capital: Comilla
- Religion: Buddhism
- Government: Hereditary monarchy
- History
  - Fall of Chandra dynasty: c. 1000
  - Dissolution into Deva Dynasty: c. 1300
Succeeded by
Twipra Kingdom
- Today part of: India; Bangladesh; Myanmar

Kingdom of Tripura
- Part of History of Tripura
Kings of Tripura
Maha Manikya	c. 1400–1431
Dharma Manikya I	1431–1462
Ratna Manikya I	1462–1487
Pratap Manikya	1487
Vijaya Manikya I	1488
Mukut Manikya	1489
Dhanya Manikya	1490–1515
Dhwaja Manikya	1515–1520
Deva Manikya	1520–1530
Indra Manikya I	1530–1532
Vijaya Manikya II	1532–1563
Ananta Manikya	1563–1567
Udai Manikya I	1567–1573
Joy Manikya I	1573–1577
Amar Manikya	1577–1585
Rajdhar Manikya I	1586–1600
Ishwar Manikya	1600
Yashodhar Manikya	1600–1623
Interregnum	1623–1626
Kalyan Manikya	1626–1660
Govinda Manikya	1660–1661
Chhatra Manikya	1661–1667
Govinda Manikya	1661–1673
Rama Manikya	1673–1685
Ratna Manikya II	1685–1693
Narendra Manikya	1693–1695
Ratna Manikya II	1695–1712
Mahendra Manikya	1712–1714
Dharma Manikya II	1714–1725
Jagat Manikya	1725–1729
Dharma Manikya II	1729
Mukunda Manikya	1729–1739
Joy Manikya II	1739–1744
Indra Manikya II	1744–1746
Udai Manikya II	1744
Joy Manikya II	1746
Vijaya Manikya III	1746–1748
Lakshman Manikya	1740s/1750s
Interregnum	1750s–1760
Krishna Manikya	1760–1783
Rajdhar Manikya II	1785–1806
Rama Ganga Manikya	1806–1809
Durga Manikya	1809–1813
Rama Ganga Manikya	1813–1826
Kashi Chandra Manikya	1826–1829
Krishna Kishore Manikya	1829–1849
Ishan Chandra Manikya	1849–1862
Bir Chandra Manikya	1862–1896
Radha Kishore Manikya	1896–1909
Birendra Kishore Manikya	1909–1923
Bir Bikram Kishore Manikya	1923–1947
Kirit Bikram Kishore Manikya	1947–1949; 1949–1978 (titular)
Kirit Pradyot Manikya	1978–present (titular)

Tripura monarchy data
- Manikya dynasty (Royal family)
- Agartala (Capital of the kingdom)
- Ujjayanta Palace (Royal residence)
- Pushbanta Palace (Royal residence)
- Neermahal (Royal residence)
- Rajmala (Royal chronicle)
- Tripura Buranji (Chronicle)
- Chaturdasa Devata (Family deities)

Paṭṭikera was a kingdom in the region of Tripura and Bengal from the 11th to 13th century. It was also mentioned in Burmese chronicles of the Pagan Kingdom's history.

== History ==
After the decline of the Chandra dynasty in the Tripura region, the region of Comilla of the former Chandra Kingdom was in a power vacuum. The region thus soon came under the occupation of the predecessors of the Ranavaṅkamalla Harikāla-Deva, whose kingdom was named Paṭṭtikera. The name Paṭṭikera was used on various Chandra coins which has been argued to show a shift in power between the dynasties over time. The copper plate of Śaka 1141 in the Maināmati Hills also supports this dynastic transformation in the region. It records that in the 17th year of his reign, he allotted land to a Buddhist monastery in the city of Paṭṭikera in Śaka 1141 (1219 AD).

The earliest textual reference to Paṭṭikera is in the Ashṭasāsṛikā-Pajñā-Pāramitā, now in the Cambridge University Collection. Other textual references are Burmese chronicles. The Glass Palace Chronicles claims that King Anawrahta's kingdom of Pagan extended westward towards the Kala country of Pateikkara.

Another historical account dsicusses how King Kyansittha's daughter Shwe Einthi fell in love with a prince from Paṭṭikera after they met in secret. However, Kyansittha forbade their marriage as he feared the Pagan Kingdom coming under Indian control and domination, and the princess was married off to another suitor named Saw Yun. Burmese accounts however diverge at this point and say the prince died upon hearing of the marriage, either out of starvation or falling from the sky. His bones were claimed to have been kept at the place called "Wa" by Shin Arahan. The chronicle again mentions Paṭṭikera but as the southwestward "kala" (Indian) country to the Pagan Kingdom. Later upon the death of Shin Arahan, Prince Alaungsithu became King and tested the claim of the Paṭṭikera prince's bones having been kept by Shin Arahan. He was rumoured to be the flesh of the former prince. He declared that if the bones were "his" then they should float upon the water, which they did, and thus Alungsithu took the bones and treasured them in the Shwegu Pagoda. The next mention is made during a battle between Pagan and Arakan at a location known as Pateikkara Taungnyo (Mountains of Paṭṭtikera.

Alaungsithu later married the daughter of the Paṭṭikera king, who was given the name Pabhavati by him. When his three sons came to him, Alaungsithu was sitting with the queen and she did not rise in their presence. Minshinaw insulted the queen called her a "Kala wench" who didn't abide customs in front of ministers and councillors and left. Later, Alaungsithu in his old age was moved from his palace by his son Narathu, who killed him via suffocation of clothes and garments. Alaungsithu's former wife, Pabhavati maintained as Narathu's minister. However, when she rebuffed his advances because he didn't wash water during ablutions, Narathu became insulted. As a result, he killed her with his sword. When the Paṭṭikera king heard of this incident, he arranged a squad of assassins to dress as Brahmins and infiltrate the palace and kill him. He granted benefits to the assassins and their families and gave them Brahmin robes, a conch and a sword at their waist. They arrived at Pagan and met with the king as audience. Under a false reason of giving him the conch, they surrounded him and proclaimed that Paṭṭikera's "son" and "daughter" both perished because of Pagan and thus cut him and pierced him to death. When the royal guard arrived, the assassins pierced themselves with their swords and died. Narathu became known as the Kalagya King (King killed by Indians).

The king recorded during this period of the kingdom's history is known as Raṇavaṅkamalla who scholar believe were independent despite the Pala and Sena realms of Bengal. However, Raṇavaṅkamalla's association with the Burmese Chronicles is difficult to verify if it was him or an older family of the kingdom. The fate of Paṭṭikera is believed to be incorporated into other kingdoms such as those with names ending in "Deva". Following some more short lived dynasties and polities, the Kingdom of Twipra is formed with Chhengthung Fā.

== Sources ==
- Luce, Gordon (1921). The Glass Palace Chronicles (PDF). London: Oxford University Press.
- Sarma, Ramanimohan (1986). Political History of Tripura (PDF). Calcutta: Puthipatra.
