= Apeyadana =

Apeyadana အပယ် ရတနာ

Chief queen consort of Burma
- Tenure: 1084 – c. 1100s (decade)
- Predecessor: Usaukpan
- Successor: Thanbula
- Born: c. 1040s (decade)
- Died: c. 1100s (decade); Pagan (Bagan)
- Spouse: Kyansittha
- Issue: Shwe Einthi
- House: Pagan
- Religion: Theravada Buddhism

Apeyadana (Burmese: အပယ် ရတနာ, pronounced [ʔəpɛ̀ jədənà]; also spelled Abeyadana) was the chief queen consort of King Kyansittha of the Pagan Dynasty of Burma (Myanmar) and maternal grandmother of King Sithu I of Pagan. She married Kyansittha when he was just a young officer in the army, before his coronation. She was succeeded as the chief queen by Thanbula.

The Apeyadana Temple in Bagan (Pagan) is named after her.

== Popular culture ==
- Portrayed by May Than Nu in Kyan Sit Min (2005) film.

== Bibliography ==
- Harvey, G. E. (1925). History of Burma: From the Earliest Times to 10 March 1824. London: Frank Cass & Co. Ltd.
- Royal Historical Commission of Burma (1832). Hmannan Yazawin (in Burmese). Vol. 1–3 (2003 ed.). Yangon: Ministry of Information, Myanmar.

Apeyadana Pagan Dynasty Born: c. 1040s Died: c. 1100s
Royal titles
Preceded by Manisanda	Chief queen consort of Burma; 1084–c. 1100s	Succeeded by Thanbula
