= Saw Mon Hla =

Saw Mon Hla စောမွန်လှ
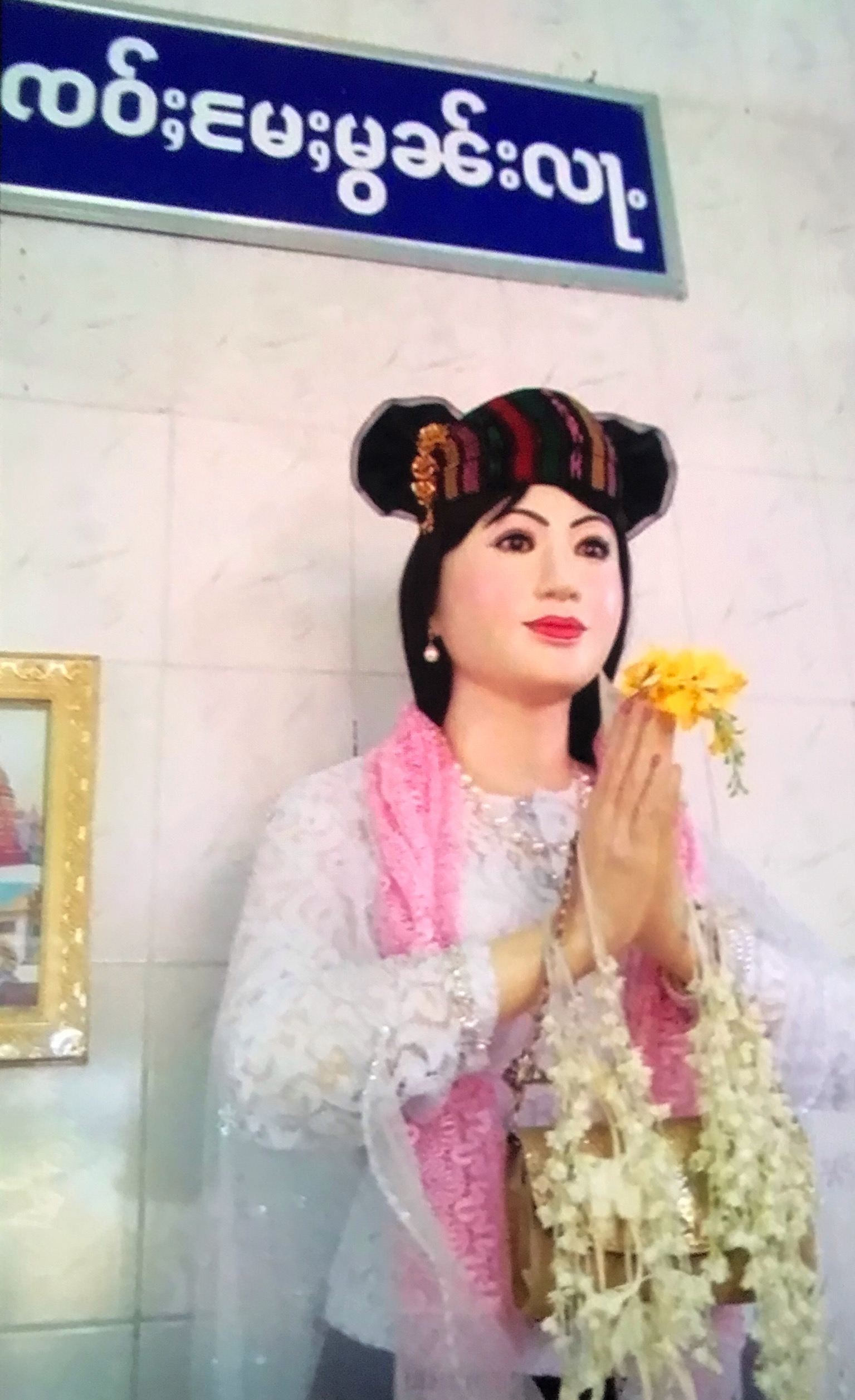
- Statue of Saw Mon Hla

Princess of Mong Mao
- Tenure: c. 1040s–1058

Queen of the Northern Palace of Pagan
- Tenure: c. 1058–1070
- Predecessor: Myauk Pyinthe
- Successor: Manisanda
- Born: 1040s Sae Lant village, Northern Maw Shan State
- Died: Hsipaw
- Spouse: Anawrahta
- House: Maw
- Father: Chao-Tai-pha
- Religion: Theravada Buddhism

Saw Mon Hla (Burmese: စောမွန်လှ [sɔ́ mʊ̀ɰ̃ l̥a̰]) was a principal queen of King Anawrahta of Pagan. She is known in Burmese history for her beauty and her eventual exile instigated by rival queen Agga Mahae Thi Her story is still part of popular Burmese theater, and she is portrayed as a tragic romantic figure.

The queen was daughter of the saopha (chief) Chao-Tai-pha of Mong Mao, located between Pagan and Dali Kingdom (present day Yunnan). The native stories of Hsipaw (Thibaw) and Hsenwi (Theinni) claim Saw Mon Hla as their princess.

In c. 1058, Anawrahta led an expedition to Dali. After his return from the Dali expedition, the king was presented with Saw Mon Hla by her brother (or, in some telling, her father Saw Naung, the chief of Mon). At Pagan, Saw Mon Hla quickly became the king's favorite queen.

== Legend of Shwesayan Pagoda ==
According to Burmese chronicles, Saw Mon Hla was exiled by rival queen Agga Mahae Thi who was envious of her position as Anawrahta's favorite, accusing her of practicing witchcraft. Therefore, Saw Mon Hla was forced by Anawrahta to return to her homeland, Maw.

On her return to Sae Lant village in Northern Maw Shan State, one of Saw Mon Hla's earrings, which enshrined a relic of the Buddha, fell into a stream. As it did, dozens of golden sparrows appeared, encircling the spot where the earring had dropped. The stream was thereafter named "Na Daung Kya," meaning "the earring fell into." Near the riverbank, in present-day Patheingyi, Mandalay, she built a pagoda to enshrine her earring and the Buddha relic. The pagoda's façade faced east, toward her birthplace in Shan State. When King Anawrahta learned of this, he sent soldiers with orders: if the pagoda faced east, she was to be killed; if it faced west, toward Pagan, she was to be spared.

Saw Mon Hla, upon hearing the news, made a solemn wish to save herself and used her emerald shawl to turn the pagoda so that it faced directly between east and west. According to legend, when the soldiers arrived, they saw that the pagoda wasn’t facing Shan State, and thus, she was spared. The pagoda was named Shwesayan, meaning "encircled by golden sparrows". Saw Mon Hla and her brother died at their home near Hsipaw and are believed to have become nats (spirits) who protect the Shwesayan Pagoda to this day. A small memorial palace near the pagoda features a statue of Saw Mon Hla and her brother. King Anawrahta, deeply regretful after banishing his queen and hearing of her death, donated the surrounding land to the pagoda near the end of his reign.

== Spiritual life ==
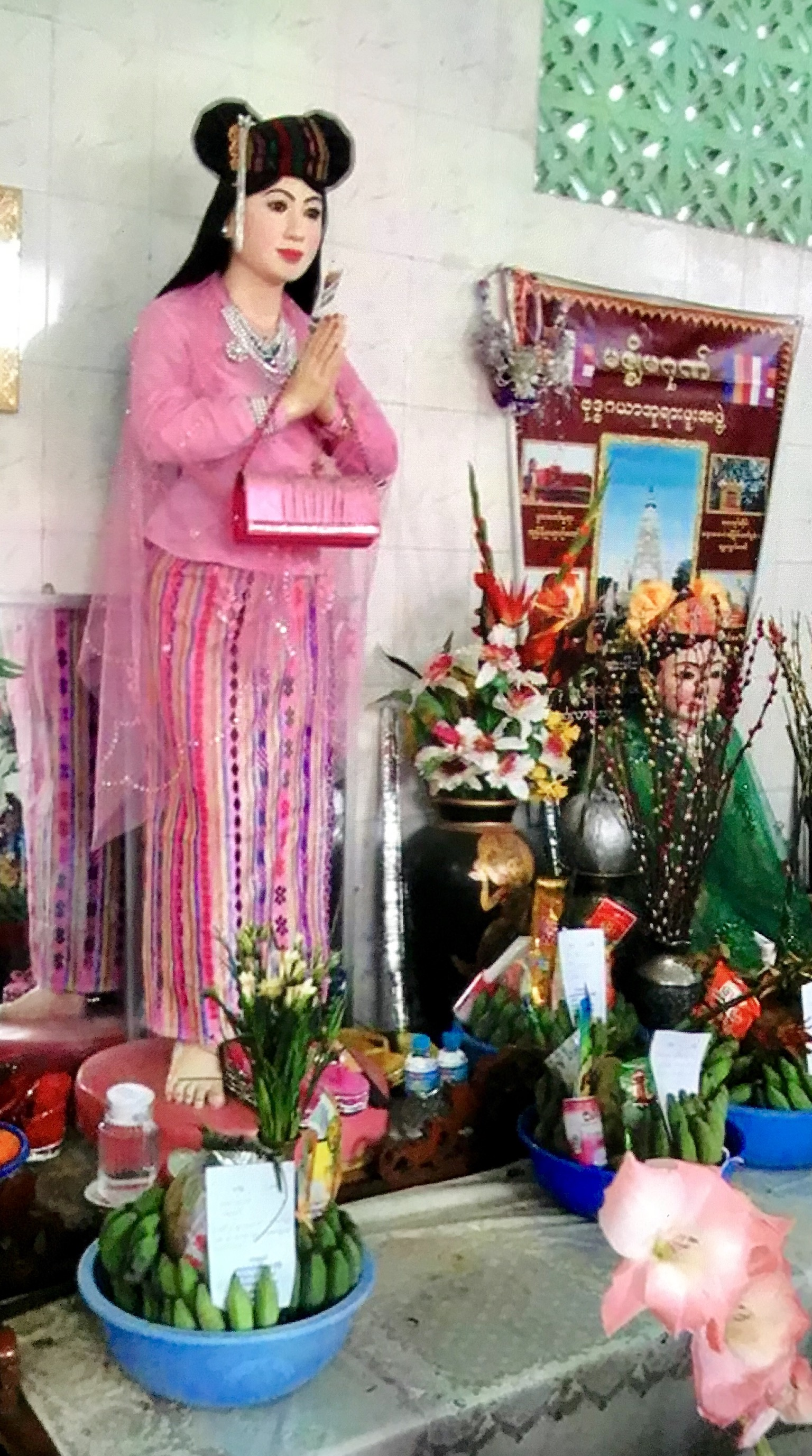
Saw Mon Hla statue in the shrine

Some people believe Sao Mon Hla, who died at her home near Hsipaw, along with her brother Saw Naung, became guardian spirits who protects the pagoda to this day. There is a Nat shrine near the Shwesayan Pagoda, which has a statue of Sao Mon Hla and her brother. Some people believe it is a shrine for the spirits and that if they make offerings, the spirits will bless them. Paying respect to the spirits of Sao Mon Hla and her brother at Shwe Sar Yan Pagoda has drawn more visitors than other pagoda festivals.

Saw Mon Hla Pagan Dynasty
Royal titles
Preceded by Myauk Pyinthe	Queen of the Northern Palace c. 1058–c. 1070	Succeeded by Manisanda
