= Thanbula =

Thanbula သမ္ဘူလ

Chief queen consort of Burma
- Tenure: c. 1100s–1112
- Predecessor: Apeyadana
- Successor: Yadanabon
- Born: c. 1060s Kyaungbyu
- Died: Unknown; Pagan (Bagan)
- Spouse: Kyansittha
- Issue: Yazakumar
Names
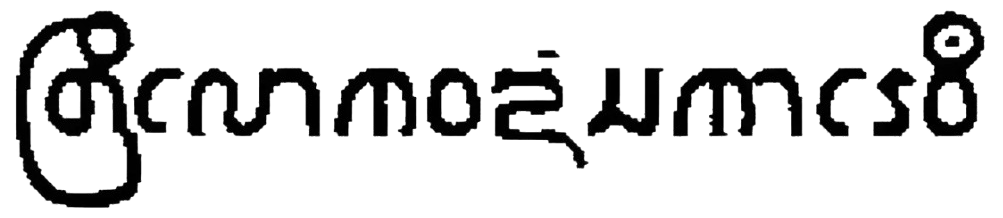
- Tri Lo Ka Wa Ṭaṁ Sa Kā De Wĭ
- House: Pagan
- Religion: Theravada Buddhism

Thanbula (Burmese: သမ္ဘူလ, pronounced [θàɰ̃bùla̰]; Trilokavatamsika, U Sauk Pan, or Sambhula, also spelled Thambula) was a chief queen consort of King Kyansittha of the Pagan Dynasty of Burma (Myanmar). She met Kyansittha while he was in exile at Kyaungbyu, and later gave birth to Yazakumar. Kyansittha went back to Bagan (Pagan), and later became king. She found out about it only years later and showed up at the palace gate with their son. By then, Kyansittha, thinking he did not have a male heir, had already anointed his grandson Alaungsithu the heir apparent. Kyansittha made her his chief queen with the title Usaukpan and Yazakumar the titular lord of North Arakan and Seven Hill Tracts.

== Bibliography ==
- Harvey, G. E. (1925). History of Burma: From the Earliest Times to 10 March 1824. London: Frank Cass & Co. Ltd.
- Royal Historical Commission of Burma (1832). Hmannan Yazawin (in Burmese). Vol. 1–3 (2003 ed.). Yangon: Ministry of Information, Myanmar.

Thanbula Pagan Dynasty Born: c. 1060s
Royal titles
Preceded by Apeyadana	Chief queen consort of Burma c. 1100s–1112	Succeeded by Yadanabon
