= Yamankan =

Yamankan ရမန်ကန်း

Governor of Pegu
- Reign: 1077–1084
- Born: c. 1039; Pagan (Bagan)?
- Died: 1084; Ywatha (near Myingyan)
- Religion: Theravada Buddhism

Nga Yamankan (Burmese: ငရမန်ကန်း, pronounced [ŋə jəmàɰ̃ɡáɰ̃]; c. 1039–1084) was Governor of Pegu (Bago) from 1077 to 1084, who raised an unsuccessful rebellion against Saw Lu of Pagan Dynasty. He nearly succeeded. He captured and killed Lu. But he was driven out of Upper Burma by Lu's half-brother, Kyansittha and was killed while in retreat.

== Early life ==
Yamankan, an ethnic Mon, was raised in Pagan at the court of King Anawrahta. His mother, who was of noble birth, was Anawrahta's son Lu's wet nurse. his posthumous name Yamankan. (Note: (Htin Aung 1967: 38–39): The name Yamankan literally means "Karma" (Yaman or Raman means Mon, and Kan means Karma.) It was an insulting name given by the Burmese chronicles for his rebellion. His real personal name is lost to history.))

He and Lu grew up together at the Pagan court, and became close friends. When Lu became in king in 1077, he appointed his childhood friend governor of Pegu. Lu proved an ineffective ruler, and over time, Yamankan became convinced that he could successfully break away. He wanted independence for his Mon homeland, which was conquered by Anawrahta only in 1057.

In 1084, Yamankan had a fallout with Lu, and raised a rebellion. He sailed up the Irrawaddy river with his army, and took a position on an island a few miles below Pagan. Lu recalled Kyansittha from exile, and gave him the command of Pagan army. They marched south and halted near Myingun (near Magwe). Yamankan's army was stationed at Thayet. Lu was impatient and against Kyansittha's warning, attacked. But Yamankan had expected such an attack and prepared his positions well. Lu's army was routed and the king was taken prisoner.

Yamankan executed Lu after Kyansittha tried to rescue Lu. (Ironically, the rescue attempt was foiled by Lu who alerted the guards that he was being rescued. The captive king trusted his childhood friend and captor Yamankan more than his brother Kyansittha.) Yamankan himself was ambushed by the sniper bow-shot of Nga Sin the hunter and died.

== Governorship ==
Although the royal chronicles say he was governor of Pegu, the earliest evidence of Pegu as a place dates only to 1266, about two centuries later than when Yamankan was supposed to have been governor. Furthermore, at least one 18th century Mon language chronicle says the first governor of Pegu in the Pagan period was appointed only in 1273/74. (Note: (Phayre 1873: 41) and (Schmidt 1906: 113): The chronicle Slapat Rajawan says that Pegu was in desolate wilderness for many centuries, and that the king of Pagan appointed a governor Akhamaman, who later proclaimed himself king in 635 ME (28 March 1273 to 28 March 1274). However, Phayre cautioned that the dates in the chronicle "are not to be depended upon". (Pan Hla 2005: 28–29) says that Akhamaman became king of Pegu in 647 ME (28 March 1285 to 28 March 1286). The 1273/74 date may have been Akhamaman's appointment as governor.)

== Bibliography ==
- Aung-Thwin, Michael A. (2005). The Mists of Rāmañña: The Legend that was Lower Burma (illustrated ed.). Honolulu: University of Hawai'i Press. ISBN 9780824828868.
- Harvey, G. E. (1925). History of Burma: From the Earliest Times to 10 March 1824. London: Frank Cass & Co. Ltd.
- Htin Aung, Maung (1967). A History of Burma. New York and London: Cambridge University Press.
- Pan Hla, Nai (1968). Razadarit Ayedawbon (in Burmese) (8th printing, 2005 ed.). Yangon: Armanthit Sarpay.
- Phayre, Major-General Sir Arthur P. (1873). "The History of Pegu". Journal of the Asiatic Society of Bengal. 42. Calcutta: 23–57, 120–159.
- Schmidt, P.W. (1906). "Slapat des Ragawan der Königsgeschichte". Die äthiopischen Handschriften der K.K. Hofbibliothek zu Wien (in German). 151. Vienna: Alfred Hölder.

Yamankan Pagan Dynasty Born: c. 1039 Died: 1084
Royal titles
Preceded by	Governor of Pegu c. 1077–1084	Succeeded by
