= Manisanda =

Manisanda Khin U မဏိစန္ဒာ ခင်ဦး

Queen of the Northern Palace
- Tenure: 1084–1112
- Predecessor: herself
- Successor: Yadanabon I (as the Chief Queen)
- King: Kyansittha

Queen of the Northern Palace
- Tenure: 1077–1084
- Predecessor: herself
- Successor: herself
- King: Saw Lu

Queen of the Northern Palace
- Tenure: 1070s–1077
- Predecessor: Saw Mon Hla
- Successor: herself
- King: Anawrahta; Saw Lu
- Born: Pegu (Bago)
- Died: Pagan (Bagan)
- Spouse: Anawrahta (1070s–77); Saw Lu (1077–84); Kyansittha (1084–1112)
- House: Pegu
- Father: Ruler of Pegu
- Religion: Theravada Buddhism

Manisanda Khin U (Burmese: မဏိစန္ဒာ ခင်ဦး [mənḭsàɰ̃dà kʰɪ̀ɰ̃ ʔú]; Pali: Maṇicandā, "Jewel-Moon") was queen to three consecutive kings of Pagan dynasty of Burma (Myanmar). The ethnic Mon queen is famous in Burmese history for her love triangle with Gen. Kyansittha and King Anawrahta. Their story has been compared to the legend of King Arthur, Lancelot and Guinevere.

Manisanda was a daughter of the ruler of Pegu (Bago), which was subject to Pagan. Circa early 1070s, her father gave the princess to Anawrahta in gratitude for Pagan's help in repelling attacks on Pegu by foreign invaders from the direction of Chiang Mai. Kyansittha, who led the Pagan army that drove out the invaders, rode alongside the lady Manisanda, who was borne in a curtained litter. During the long journey, they fell in love with each other so deeply that the matter had to be reported to Anawrahta. The king nearly killed Kyansittha and banished his adopted son and best general for the rest of his reign. The princess, who was probably still in her early to mid teens, became one of his queens.

After Anawrahta's death, Saw Lu became king and married her. Uninterested in running the kingdom, Lu brought Kyansittha back from banishment. But Kyansittha and Manisanda resumed their love affair, and Lu too had to banish Kyansittha. Her father, the ruler of Pegu, had died by then, and Lu appointed his childhood friend Yamankan as governor of Pegu. In 1084, Lu was killed by Yamankan, who had raised a rebellion against Pagan rule.

Kyansittha defeated the rebellion and became king of Pagan. He married his love Manisanda, for whom he had twice endured exile, and made her his queen. She became queen to the third monarch in succession.

== Bibliography ==
- Harvey, G.E. (1925). History of Burma. London: Frank Cass & Co. Ltd.
- Maung Htin Aung, Maung (1967). A History of Burma. New York and London: Cambridge University Press.
- Maha Sithu (2012) [1798]. Myint Swe; Kyaw Win; Thein Hlaing (eds.). Yazawin Thit (in Burmese). Vol. 1–3. Yangon: Ya-Pyei Publishing.

Manisanda Pagan Dynasty
Royal titles
Preceded by Usaukpan	Chief queen consort of Burma; 1077–1084	Succeeded by Apeyadana
Preceded by herself	Queen of the Northern Palace; 1084–1112	Succeeded by Yadanabon I as Chief queen consort
Preceded by Saw Mon Hla	Queen of the Northern Palace; 1070s–1077	Succeeded by herself
