= Saw Lu =

Saw Lu စောလူး
- King of Pagan

King of Burma
- Reign: 11 April 1077 – April 1084
- Predecessor: Anawrahta
- Successor: Kyansittha
- Born: 19 April 1049; Wednesday, 1st waning of Kason 411 ME (Note: Per (Yazawin Thit 2012: 108, footnote 2) which cites (Tin Naing Toe 2006: 71–76)'s conversion of Zatadawbon Yazawin's horoscope of Saw Lu.); Pagan
- Died: before 21 April 1084 before Sunday, Full moon of Kason 446 ME; Pyidawtha Island, near Magwe
- Consort: Usaukpan; Manisanda
- Issue: Saw Yun
Regnal name
- Śrīvájrabharaṇatribupati
- House: Pagan
- Father: Anawrahta
- Mother: Agga Mahethi
- Religion: Theravada Buddhism

Saw Lu (Burmese: စောလူး [sɔ́ lú]; also spelled Sawlu; also known as Min Lulin (မင်းလုလင် [mɪ́ɰ̃ lṵlɪ̀ɰ̃]), lit. 'Boy King'; 19 April 1049 – c. 21 April 1084) was king of Pagan dynasty of Burma (Myanmar) from 1077 to 1084. He inherited from his father Anawrahta the Pagan Empire, the first ever unified kingdom of Burma (Myanmar) but proved an inexperienced ruler. In 1082, he faced a rebellion in Lower Burma, and was captured c. April 1083. He was killed in captivity about a year later.

== Early life ==
Saw Lu was born to King Anawrahta and Queen Agga Mahethi, Queen of the Southern Palace. The Burmese chronicles do not agree on the dates regarding his life and reign. The table below lists the dates given by the four main chronicles, and scholarship.

| Source | Birth–Death | Age | Reign | Length of reign |
|---|---|---|---|---|
| Zatadawbon Yazawin (List of Monarchs Section) | 1050–1084 | 34 | 1077–1084 | 7 |
| Zatadawbon Yazawin (Royal Horoscopes Section) | 1049–1084 | 34 | 1077–1084 | 7 |
| Maha Yazawin | 1006–1061 | 55 | 1035–1061 (Note: (Maha Yazawin Vol. 1 184–185): Saw Lu died in 423 ME (1061–1062 CE), and his death was followed by two years interregnum. Kyansittha succeeded the throne only in 425 ME (1063–1064 CE).) | 26 |
| Yazawin Thit | 1010–1065 | 54 | February 1060 – 1065 | 5 |
| Hmannan Yazawin | 1020–1065 | 45 | 1060–1065 | 5 |
| Scholarship | 19 April 1049–before 21 April 1084 | 34 | 11 April 1077–before 21 April 1084 | 7 |

Moreover, the chronicles do not agree whether or not Saw Lu was older than Kyansittha, Anawrahta's other son. According to early chronicles, Kyansittha was older (20 years per Zata) and (two years per Maha Yazawin). However, later chronicles Yazawin Thit and Hmannan say Saw Lu was older by about one and two years, respectively.

At any rate, Anawrahta made Saw Lu the heir presumptive even though Anawrahta already had a son, Kyansittha by a minor queen whom he had discarded. Saw Lu was brought up by a Mon lady of noble birth. He grew up with the wet nurse's son Yamankan, who became a close friend of his. Saw Lu was not interested in running the kingdom, and never participated in any of his father's military campaigns. He viewed Kyansittha, his half-brother and general in the Pagan army who was extremely popular with the people, with suspicion.

== Reign ==
Saw Lu ascended to the Pagan throne on 11 April 1077 after his father Anawrahta had died under mysterious circumstances. When he became king, he married his father's Mon queen Manisanda (Khin U) and made her the chief queen. His regnal title was Śrīvájrabharaṇatribupati (ၐြီဝဇြာဗရဏ တြိဘုပတိ).

To run the Mon-speaking territories in the south, he appointed his trusted childhood friend Yamankan, an ethnic Mon. To administer the upcountry, Saw Lu, at the urging of Primate Shin Arahan, reluctantly brought back Kyansittha, who had been sent to exile by Anawrahta for his affair with Manisanda. However, Saw Lu soon had to banish Kyansittha again (this time to Dala near Yangon) because the latter renewed his affair with Manisanda.

=== Mon rebellion ===
As governor of Pegu, Yamankan continued to visit Saw Lu at Pagan. (Note: (Htin Aung 1967: 38): the name Yamankan (literally, Blind Mon) was not the governor's true name. It was an insulting posthumous name given by the chroniclers. His true name is lost to history.) Knowing the inexperience of his childhood friend well, Yamankan decided to rebel. The chronicles describe the final breach between Saw Lu and Yamankan in a dramatic way. The two were playing a game of dice, and Yamankan won. As Yamankan romped about in joy at his victory, Saw Lu taunted him, "If you are so clever, why don't you rebel against me?"

Yamankan went back to Pegu, and revolted. In late 1082, he sailed up the Irrawaddy river with his army, and took a position on an island a few miles below Pagan. Saw Lu recalled Kyansittha from exile, and gave him the command of Pagan army. They marched south and halted near Myingun (near Magwe). Yamankan's army was stationed at Thayet. Saw Lu was impatient and against Kyansittha's warning, attacked. But Yamankan had expected such an attack and prepared his positions well. Saw Lu's army was routed and the king was taken prisoner. According to the chronicle Zatadawbon Yazawin, the battle between Saw Lu and Yamankan took place in November 1082. (Note: (Zata 1960: 83): 9th month (Natdaw) of 444 ME = 23 October 1082 to 20 November 1082.)

== Death ==
Kyansittha tried to rescue but Saw Lu refused to be rescued. His last fatal miscalculation that Kyansittha would kill him to get the throne but his friend Yamankan would not. He was killed by Yamankan to prevent the further rescue attempts. According to scholarship, he likely died c. April 1084 before 21 April 1084. Yamankan himself was ambushed by the sniper bow-shot of Nga Sin the hunter and died. Later Kyansittha became the third king of the Pagan Empire.

According to Zatadawbon Yazawin, Kyansittha and Yamankan fought a battle c. April 1083 (Kason of 445 ME). (Note: (Zata 1960: 84): The battle took place in Kason 445 ME ( 21 March 1083 to 19 April 1083). But since the new year's day of 445 ME fell on 26 March 1083 (6th waxing of Kason 445), Kason 445 only began on 6th waxing of Kason. Thus, the battle took place between 26 March and 19 April 1083.) The battle may not be the final battle in which Yamankan was slain since Zata says Saw Lu died in 1084 after having reigned seven years. However, other chronicles (Hmannan and Yazawin Thit) say he reigned only for five years, followed by an interregnum that lasted till 1084—implying that the king died in 1083.

Saw Lu was so incompetent that it says much for the genius of the father that his kingdom survived the test.

== See also ==
- Sawlumin inscription

== Bibliography ==
- Aung-Thwin, Michael A. (2005). The Mists of Rāmañña: The Legend that was Lower Burma (illustrated ed.). Honolulu: University of Hawai'i Press. ISBN 9780824828868.
- Coedès, George (1968). Walter F. Vella (ed.). The Indianized States of Southeast Asia. trans.Susan Brown Cowing. University of Hawaii Press. ISBN 978-0-8248-0368-1.
- Hall, D.G.E. (1960). Burma (3rd ed.). Hutchinson University Library. ISBN 978-1-4067-3503-1.
- Harvey, G. E. (1925). History of Burma: From the Earliest Times to 10 March 1824. London: Frank Cass & Co. Ltd.
- Htin Aung, Maung (1967). A History of Burma. New York and London: Cambridge University Press.
- Kala, U (1724). Maha Yazawin (in Burmese). Vol. 1–3 (2006, 4th printing ed.). Yangon: Ya-Pyei Publishing.
- Maha Sithu (2012) [1798]. Kyaw Win; Thein Hlaing (eds.). Yazawin Thit (in Burmese). Vol. 1–3 (2nd ed.). Yangon: Ya-Pyei Publishing.
- Royal Historians of Burma (c. 1680). U Hla Tin (Hla Thamein) (ed.). Zatadawbon Yazawin (1960 ed.). Historical Research Directorate of the Union of Burma.
- Royal Historical Commission of Burma (1832). Hmannan Yazawin (in Burmese). Vol. 1–3 (2003 ed.). Yangon: Ministry of Information, Myanmar.

Saw Lu Pagan Dynasty Born: 19 April 1049 Died: c. 21 April 1084
Regnal titles
| Preceded by Anawrahta | King of Burma; 1077–1084 | Succeeded by Kyansittha |
Royal titles
| Preceded by Sokkate | Heir to the Burmese Throne; 1049–1077 | Succeeded by Sithu I |
