= Kyansittha =

Emperor of the Pagan dynasty of Myanmar

Kyansittha ကျန်စစ်သား
- King of Pagan
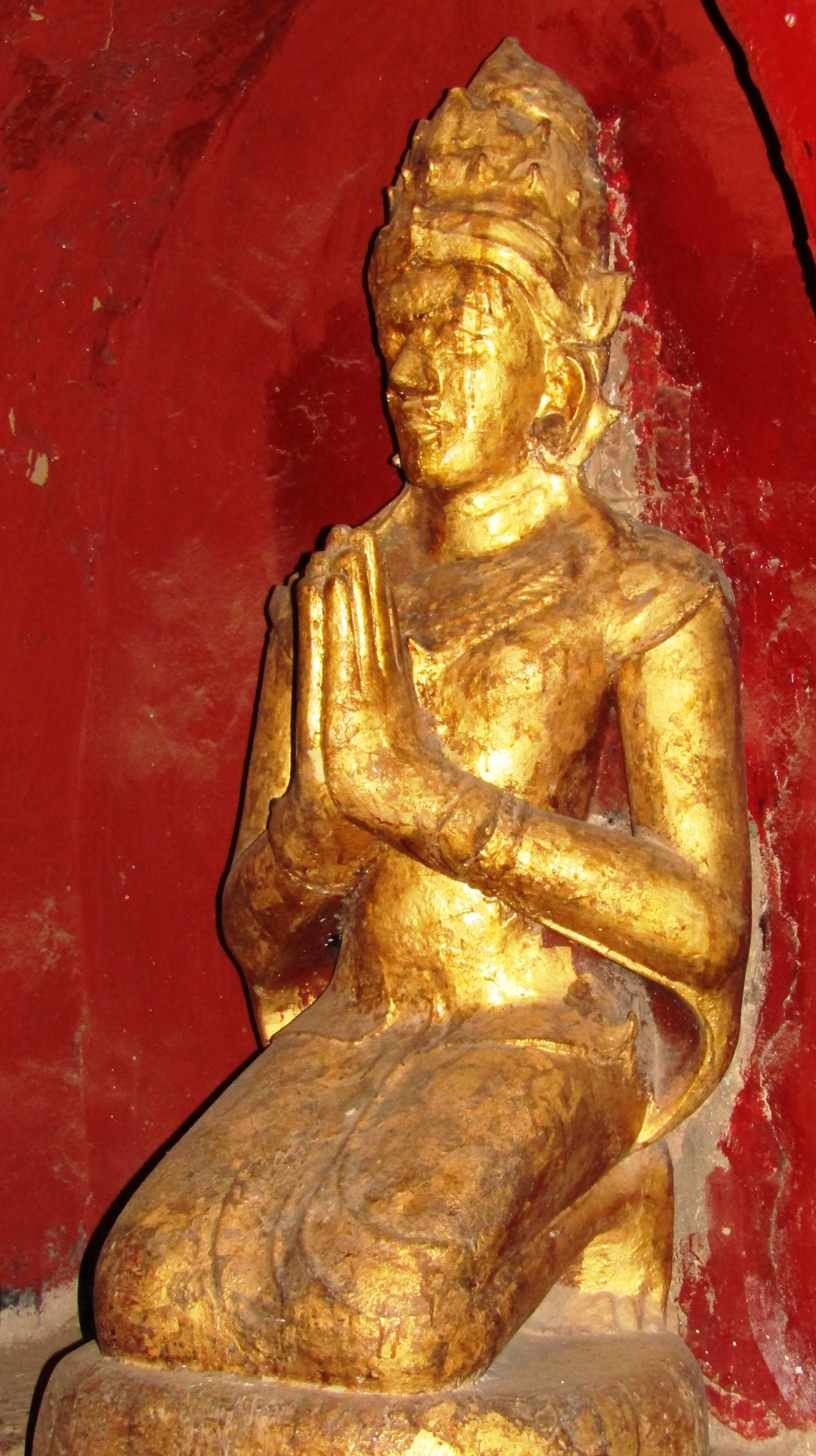
- Statue of Kyansittha at the Ananda Temple

King of Burma
- Reign: 21 April 1084 – 1112/13
- Predecessor: Saw Lu
- Successor: Alaungsithu
- Born: 21 July 1030; Tuesday, 5th waning of Wagaung 392 ME; Pareimma, Sagaing
- Died: 1112/13 (aged 82-83); 474 ME; Pagan
- Consort: Apeyadana; Thanbula; Khin Tan; Manisanda
- Issue: Shwe Einthi; Yazakumar
Regnal name
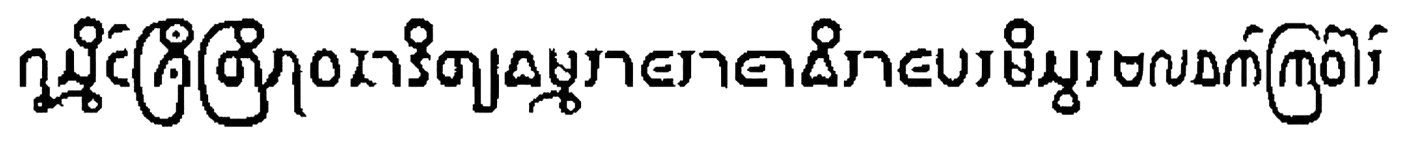
- Śri Tri Bhūvanāditya Dhammarājādhirāja Paramisvara bala cakkravār
- House: Pagan
- Father: Anawrahta
- Mother: Pyinsa Kalayani
- Religion: Theravada Buddhism

Kyansittha (Burmese: ကျန်စစ်သား, pronounced [tɕàɰ̃sɪʔθá]; also spelt as Kyanzittha or Hti-Hlaing Min (ထီးလှိုင်မင်း); 21 July 1030 – 1112/13) was king of the Pagan dynasty of Burma (Myanmar) from 1084 to 1112/13, and is considered one of the greatest Burmese monarchs. He continued the social, economic and cultural reforms begun by his father, King Anawrahta. Pagan became an internationally recognized power during his 28-year reign. The Burmese language and culture continued to gain ground.

In his early life, Kyansittha was a popular and successful general who led Anawrahta's major military campaigns that founded the Pagan Empire. He was exiled twice in the 1070s and 1080s for his affair with Queen Manisanda. Kyansittha ascended to the Pagan throne in 1084 after suppressing a major Mon rebellion that killed King Saw Lu.

His reign was largely peaceful. A great admirer of Mon culture, he pursued a conciliatory policy towards the Mon of the south, and continued the patronage of Mon language and culture at his court. It was in his reign that the synthesis of Burman, Mon, Pyu and Buddhist practices into a Burmese cultural tradition began to reach a level of maturity. The Burmese script began to be used alongside Pyu, Mon, and Pali. A peaceful Pagan grew wealthy from agriculture and trade, and large scale temple building began in earnest. Kyansittha completed Anawrahta's Shwezigon Pagoda and built his crowning achievement, the Ananda Temple. Pagan became a major center of Buddhist learning. Theravada Buddhism continued to gain ground although many Ari, Mahayana and Brahminical practices continued to pervade. Pagan emerged a major power alongside the Khmer Empire in Southeast Asia, recognized as a sovereign kingdom by the Chinese Song dynasty, and Indian Chola dynasty.

Kyansittha is one of the most famous monarchs in Burmese history. His life stories and exploits are still retold in Burmese literature, theater, and cinema.

== Early life ==
Much of Kyansittha's early life, like much of early Pagan history, is shrouded in legend. Many of the stories given in the Burmese chronicles attributed to Kyansittha are legends, with a heavy touch of literary flourish.

=== Parentage ===
According to the chronicles, Kyansittha was born to Princess Pyinsa Kalayani of Wethali and Anawrahta, then a senior prince at the court of King Sokkate. He grew up away from Anawrahta's court after Anawrahta banished his mother who was pregnant with him to the countryside because Anawrahta was led to believe that she was not of royal blood. The chronicles also speculate that Kyansittha's real father might not be Anawrahta but Yazataman, the Pagan official who guarded Pyinsa Kalayani during her journey to Pagan. Nonetheless, the chronicles accept that he was a legal son of Anawrahta per Burmese customary law, which says a child born in wedlock is presumed to have been begotten by the husband. At any rate, a stone inscription at the Hledauk Pagoda in Taungbyon says that it was donated by Kyansittha, son of Anawrahta.

=== Birth date ===
The chronicles do not agree on the dates regarding his life and reign. The table below lists the dates given by the four main chronicles.

Chronicles	Birth–Death	Age	Reign	Length of reign
Zatadawbon Yazawin	1030–1111	80	1084–1111	27
Maha Yazawin	1004–1088	84	1063 (Note: (Maha Yazawin Vol. 1 184–185): Saw Lu died in 423 ME (1061–1062 CE), and his death was followed by two years interregnum. Kyansittha succeeded the throne only in 425 ME (1063–1064 CE).)–1088	25
Yazawin Thit	1032–1093	61	1064–1093	29
Hmannan Yazawin	1021–1092	71	1064–1092	28

Moreover, according to Zata, considered the most accurate chronicle for the dates of the best-known Pagan and Ava kings, Kyansittha was born on 21 July 1030, and was about 19 years older than Saw Lu. Maha Yazawin says Kyansittha was about four years older but the two later chronicles Yazawin Thit and Hmannan say Kyansittha was about a year younger than Lu. If Hmannan is correct about Kyansittha's age at death, Kyansittha was born in 1041. (Note: (Hmannan Vol. 1 2003: 286) says he came to power at age 43 (in his 44th year). Since Kyansittha came to power in 446 ME (1084/1085 CE) per Myazedi Inscription and Zata, it means he was born in 403 ME (1041/1042 CE).)

=== Inconsistent chronicle narratives ===
Furthermore, the chronicle narratives are filled with many inconsistencies. The chronicles claim that Anawrahta was already king when Pyinsa Kalayani was sent. But Anawrahta did not become king until 1044. Kyansittha had been born at least since 1030. Moreover, it was unlikely that the ruler of Wethali would have sent his daughter to Anawrahta who until 1044 was a prince but not to Sokkate, the king himself. The chronicles also claim that King Anawrahta tried to kill off all babies in the year that Kyansittha was born because his astrologers predicted that a new born would be king. Again, Anawrahta was not the king.

=== The meaning of the name Kyansittha ===
Kyansittha's birth name is lost to history. According to the Shwezigon Pagoda inscriptions dedicated by Kyansittha himself, the name Kyansittha is a title given by Anawrahta. According to legend, the king gave him the title Kyansittha which means "the remaining/last standing soldier" because of the latter's knack for surviving in the battlefield. But according to historian George Coedes, it is a corruption of the Old Burmese word, kalan cacsaH (ကလန်စစ်သား), meaning "soldier-official".

== Military career (1057–1070s) ==
Kyansittha grew up in relative obscurity until Anawrahta recalled his son at a later point (likely by his early teens). At Anawrahta's court, he was a minor prince under the shadow of his elder half-brother Saw Lu, and served as a royal cadet in the Pagan army. Anawrahta soon recognized the ability of his son. According to tradition, in early 1057, the king made his teenage son one of four lead commanders in his invasion of Thaton Kingdom. (Anawrahta's appointment of Kyansittha as commander at such an early age indicates that Anawrahta considered Kyansittha his offspring. During the Burmese imperial era, only the royalty were allowed to assume a senior position in the army at an early age. Commoners, who had to earn that privilege over years of service, were never that young.) Pagan's forces captured Thaton after a 3-months' siege in May 1057. Kyansittha became famous as one of the Four Paladins.

More recent research by historian Michael Aung-Thwin accepts Anawrahta's conquest of Lower Burma but argues that the chronicle narrative of the conquest of Thaton is a post-Pagan legend.

Anawrahta went on found the Pagan Empire (also known as the First Burmese Empire) expanding his authority in all directions: northern Arakan in the west, Shan Hills in the north and east, and Tenasserim in the south. Kyansittha partook in all of Anawrahta's expeditions including one to the Nanzhao Kingdom, and in some cases (such as the Tenasserim campaign against the Khmer Empire) led them. Soon after the Thaton conquest, Kyansittha along with his three other "Paladins" were sent to take control of Tenasserim. The Four Paladins defeated the Khmer army, and Tenasserim became part of Pagan Empire from then on.

In the early 1070s, Kyansittha was called into service to defend Pegu (Bago) against the raiders from the direction of Chiang Mai. The Pagan army easily drove out the raiders. The ruler of Pegu, whom Anawrahta had allowed to remain as viceroy for his cooperation in the 1057 conquest of Thaton, sent his young daughter, the lady Khin U, jewels and hair relics as presents for Anawrahta. On the journey to Pagan, Khin U was borne in a curtained litter, and Kyansittha rode at her side. During the long journey, they fell in love with each other so violently that the matter had to be reported to Anawrahta. It was the end of Kyansittha's career. He was sent into exile by the king.

The Burmese chronicles report his exile with a touch of literary flourish. Kyansittha was brought bound into the presence, and Anawrahta taunted him for a time until with his anger rising, he hurled his fairy spear Areindama. But Kyansittha's hour had not yet come. The spear missed, grazing his skin and severing the ropes that bound him. He picked up the famous spear and fled never to return. His flight over hill and dale still forms a favorite subject of Burmese theater.

== Exile years (1070s–1082) ==
Kyansittha fled west, and at a time, he earned a living by tending horses. He finally settled at Kaungbyu (likely in the Sagaing District), and married Thanbula, niece of the head abbot of the local monastery. He was in his early 30s. He lived there for the remainder of Anawrahta's reign until 1077.

In April 1077, Anawrahta died, and his son Lu succeeded. Lu, who had always viewed Kyansittha as a rival, reluctantly recalled Kyansittha to Pagan, at the urging of Shin Arahan, primate of Pagan, to help administer the kingdom. Kyansittha left a pregnant Thanbula at Kaungbyu. At Pagan, he soon renewed his affair with Khin U (now with the title of Manisanda), who was now a queen of Lu. Kyansittha was promptly exiled again, this time much farther away to Dala (modern-day Yangon).

== Pegu rebellion (1082–1084) ==
In 1082, Saw Lu faced a serious rebellion by his childhood friend Yamankan, whom he had appointed governor of Pegu. The king recalled Kyansittha to put down the rebellion. At a battle near Magwe, Lu was captured in November 1082 (Natdaw 444 ME). Ministers offered Kyansittha the crown. But he refused. Instead he personally tried to rescue Lu by breaking into the enemy camp at night. Seated on Kyansittha's shoulders and well on the way to safety, Lu thought Kyansittha was kidnapping him to kill him. After all, he had never treated Kyansittha well, and could not believe that Kyansittha would risk his life to rescue someone who had treated him badly. Yamankan on the other hand was his childhood friend, and son of his wet nurse.

Lu had yelled out, "Kyansittha is stealing me!"

Kyansittha exclaiming, "Then die, thou fool; die the death of a dog at the hands of these scum", flung him down, and ran for his life. He swam across the Irrawaddy, and eventually made back to safety.

Yamankan promptly executed Lu, and marched to Pagan. Unable to blockade the fortified walls of Pagan, his army drifted north to near the present-day Ava (Inwa).

Kyansittha went to the Kyaukse region, the breadbasket of Pagan, to raise an army. He received allegiance from the chief of Htihlaing, who helped him raise men. With his army, Kyansittha drove Yamankan out. Yamankan's army fled south while Yamankan fled on a barge full of gold and gems he had looted down the Irrawaddy. Kyansittha and his army pursued the retreating Peguan forces. Midway to the Pegu country, Kyansittha's advance forces caught up with Yamankan near Myingyan. Yamankan, who was blind in one eye, was killed by an arrow through his remaining good eye.

According to the chronicle Zatadawbon Yazawin, Kyansittha and Yamankan fought a battle c. April 1083 (Kason of 445 ME). (Note: (Zata 1960: 84): The battle took place in Kason 445 ME ( 21 March 1083 to 19 April 1083). But since the new year's day of 445 ME fell on 26 March 1083 (6th waxing of Kason 445), Kason 445 only began on 6th waxing of Kason. Thus, the battle took place between 26 March and 19 April 1083.) The battle may not be the final battle in which Yamankan was slain since Zatadawbon says Saw Lu died in 1084 after having reigned seven years. However, other chronicles (Hmannan and Yazawin Thit) say he reigned only for five years, followed by an interregnum that lasted till 1084—implying that Saw Lu died in late 1082 or early 1083. At any rate, Kyansittha came to power in 1084, per the Myazedi inscription.

== Accession ==
At Pagan, Kyansittha was once proclaimed king on 21 April 1084. The coronation ceremony may have been two years later, in 1086. He ascended to the throne with the title Śrī Tribhuvanāditya Dhammarāja (ဂြီတြိဘုဝနာဒိတျဓမ္မရာဇ). The title's meaning is "Fortunate Buddhist King, Sun of the Three Worlds". He was joined by his three queens:

- Apeyadana, his first wife, with whom he had a daughter Shwe Einsi
- Khin Tan, daughter of chief of Htihlaing
- Manisanda, the lady Khin U for whom he had endured exile twice

His wife from his first exile Thanbula was not present. She would later come and see him with their son Yazakumar later.

== Reign ==
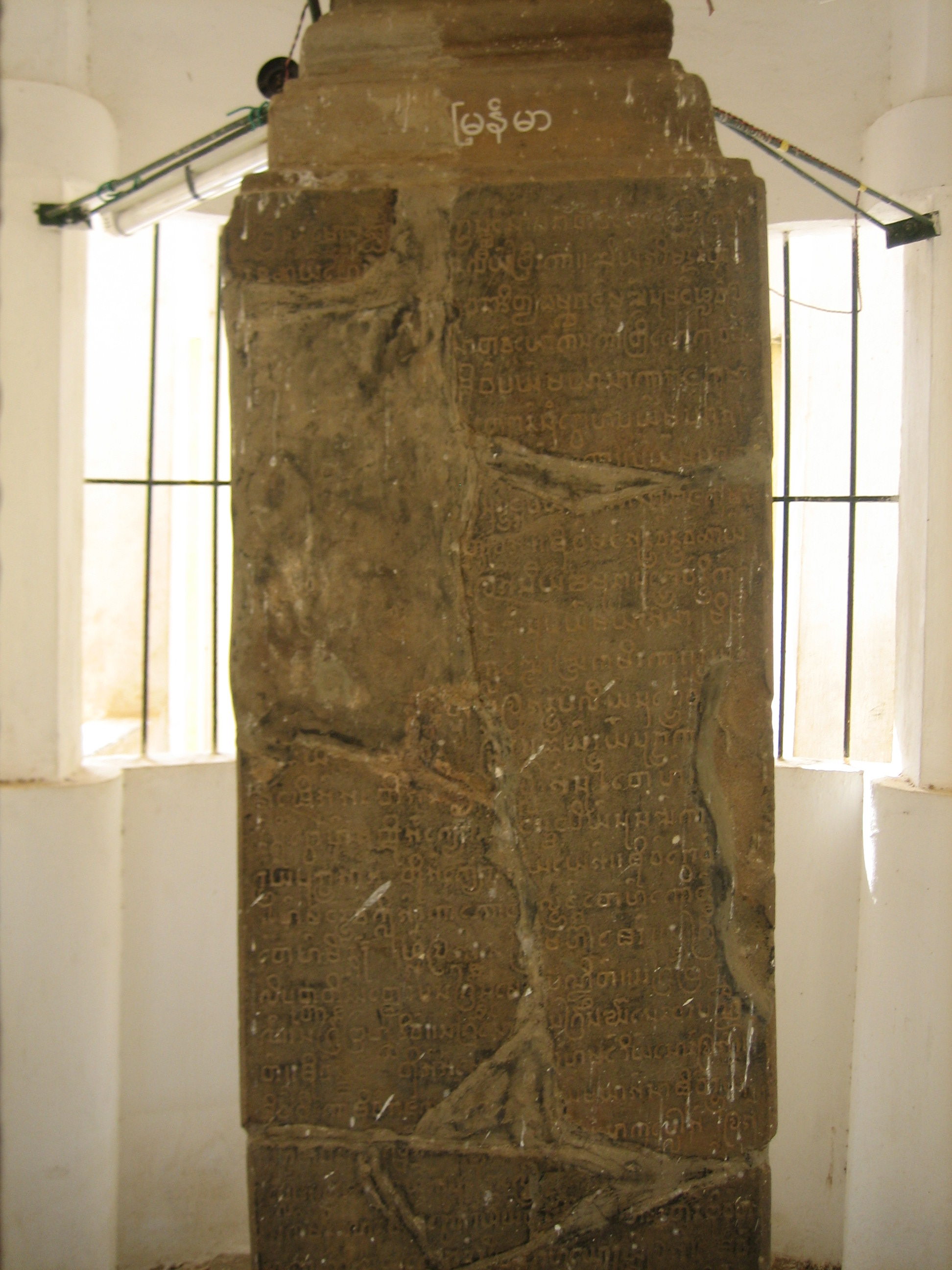
Myazedi inscription, earliest surviving stone inscription in Burmese

=== Rule of Pagan Empire ===
Kyansittha strengthened the foundations of Pagan Empire which Anawrahta had built. Although he suppressed the Mon rebellion, he pursued a conciliatory policy towards the Mon. Having spent seven years in the Mon country in exile, the king had a genuine respect for the Mon culture, and kept Mon scholars at his court. The language of most of his epigraphs is Mon (likely because the Burmese script was still coming into its own). The Mon language was widely used among the ruling elite, and the Pyu language continued to be a cultural force as well.

His policy proved effective. The rest of his reign saw no more rebellions in the south. Elsewhere too was largely peaceful. (He did send an expedition to northern Arakan because the tributary kingdom in the west had come under attack by the lord of southern Arakan. His troops repelled the attack but could not catch the lord.)

Pagan's power did not go unnoticed. The Khmer Empire, the other Southeast Asian power, stopped raiding southern Pagan territory. When Pagan sent an embassy to the Chinese Song court in 1106, the Chinese met the Burmese envoys with the full rites accorded only sovereign kingdoms.

=== Gradual growth of Burmese language ===
The use of Burmese vernacular continued to gain strength among the populace although it was still junior to more established languages of Pyu and Mon. (Pali had already replaced Sanskrit as the liturgical language since 1057.) The earliest evidence of a more settled Burmese script was the Myazedi inscription, dedicated to him in 1112 when the king was on his deathbed. The use of Pyu began to decline.

The first ever mention of the word "Myanmar" (the literary name of the Burmans (Bamar)) appeared in the epigraph of his new palace, built between December 1101 and April 1102.

=== Religious affairs ===
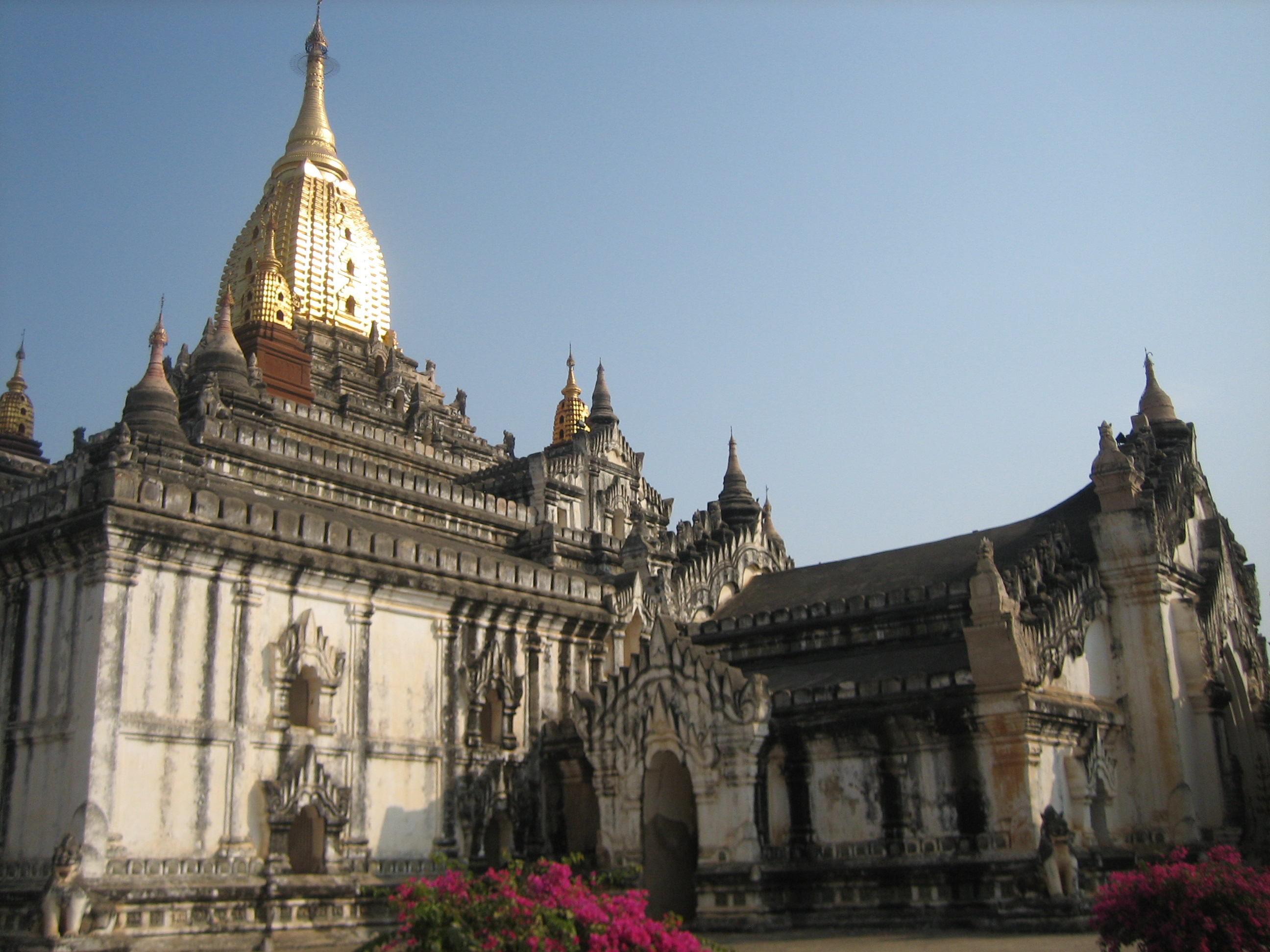
The Ananda Temple, Pagan (Bagan)

Kyansittha guided by Shin Arahan continued Anawrahta's policies to reform the Buddhism of Pagan, which was a mix of Ari Buddhism, Mahayana Buddhism, Theravada Buddhism and Hinduism. He gave sanctuary to Buddhists fleeing India (which had just come under Muslim rule). The king entertained eight learned Indian monks for three months, listening to their stories. Enthralled by the description of their great cave temple of Ananta in the Udayagiri hills of Orissa, the king commissioned the Ananda Temple in imitation. He also completed the Shwezigon Pagoda which Anawrahta began.

Nonetheless, historians contend that even the reformed religion of Shin Arahan, Anawrahta, Kyansittha and other Pagan kings was one still strongly influenced by Hinduism when compared to later more orthodox (18th and 19th century) standards. Indeed, with the approval of primate Shin Arahan, Kyansittha believed Vishnu was his patron.

=== Succession ===
Kyansittha appointed his grandson Sithu (later Alaungsithu) as heir apparent because he thought he did not have a son. It turned out that he had forgotten the pregnant wife he left in Kaungbyu when he first recalled to Pagan in 1078. Thanbula gave birth to a boy, and did not learn of Kyansittha's ascent to the throne right away. When she finally came to the Pagan to meet Kyansittha with their son, the king did not want to go back on his word. Instead he appointed the boy the titular lord of Arakan with the title of Yazakumar (Pali: Rajakumar, lit. King's son). Alaungsithu succeeded him.

== Death ==
Kyansittha died in either 1112 or 1113 after a long illness. (Note: Although Zatadawbon Yazawin says he died in 473 ME (March 1111 to March 1112 CE), the Myazedi Inscription, inscribed in 474 ME (March 1112 to March 1113), confirms that the king was in his deathbed but still alive at the time of inscription. (Htin Aung 1970: 41): According to Gordon Luce, a "less reliable Early Ava inscription" says Kyansittha's successor Sithu I had been on the throne for 37 years in 1151 CE, meaning Sithu I came to power in 1114 CE. Luce takes the middle of 1112 and 1114, gives the year of death as 1113. Htin Aung is highly skeptical of the assessment since Luce has given weight to a non-contemporary inscription, which by Luce's own admission, is "less reliable" [Luce's quotes].) He was either 82 or 83.

== Legacy ==
Kyansittha is regarded as one of the greatest Burmese monarchs for saving the nascent Pagan Empire and making it stronger. His continuation of Anawrahta's social, economic and religious policies transformed the kingdom to a major regional power. His reign is generally understood as the time when the assimilation of various cultural traditions (Mon, Pyu and Burman) began to meld into a common Burmese cultural tradition that would come to dominate the Irrawaddy valley.

=== In popular culture ===
Kyansittha is remembered as a romantic warrior king. He was popular throughout his reign and after. His life stories and exploits are still retold in Burmese literature, theater, and cinema.

- In Mobile Legends: Bang Bang, MOBA from Moonton, the character Minsitthar is based on Kyansittha.

=== Commemorations ===
- Team Kyansittha is one of four student teams into which all students in every Burmese primary and secondary school are organized. The other three teams are named after the greatest Burmese heroes: Bayinnaung, Alaungpaya and Bandula.
- UMS Kyan Sittha, Myanmar Navy Frigate

== Bibliography ==
- Cœdès, George (1966). The making of South East Asia. University of California Press.
- Coedès, George (1968). Walter F. Vella (ed.). The Indianized States of Southeast Asia. trans.Susan Brown Cowing. University of Hawaii Press. ISBN 978-0-8248-0368-1.
- Harvey, G. E. (1925). History of Burma: From the Earliest Times to 10 March 1824. London: Frank Cass & Co. Ltd.
- Htin Aung, Maung (1967). A History of Burma. New York and London: Cambridge University Press.
- Htin Aung, Maung (1970). Burmese History before 1287: A Defence of the Chronicles. Oxford: The Asoka Society.
- Kala, U (1724). Maha Yazawin (in Burmese). Vol. 1–3 (2006, 4th printing ed.). Yangon: Ya-Pyei Publishing.
- Lieberman, Victor B. (2003). Strange Parallels: Southeast Asia in Global Context, c. 800–1830, volume 1, Integration on the Mainland. Cambridge University Press. ISBN 978-0-521-80496-7.
- Maha Sithu (1798). Myint Swe; Kyaw Win; Thein Hlaing (eds.). Yazawin Thit (in Burmese). Vol. 1–3 (2012, 2nd printing ed.). Yangon: Ya-Pyei Publishing.
- Royal Historians of Burma (c. 1680). U Hla Tin (Hla Thamein) (ed.). Zatadawbon Yazawin (1960 ed.). Historical Research Directorate of the Union of Burma.
- Royal Historical Commission of Burma (1832). Hmannan Yazawin (in Burmese). Vol. 1–3 (2003 ed.). Yangon: Ministry of Information, Myanmar.
- Tarling, Nicholas (1999). The Cambridge History of Southeast Asia: Early Times to c. 1500. ISBN 9780521663694.
- Taw, Sein Ko; Blagden, C.O. (1911). "Royal Asiatic Society of Great Britain and Ireland". The Journal of the Royal Asiatic Society of Great Britain and Ireland. Royal Asiatic Society of Great Britain and Ireland: 209–216. JSTOR 25189843.
- Than Tun (1964). Studies in Burmese History (in Burmese). Vol. 1. Yangon: Maha Dagon.

Kyansittha Pagan dynasty Born: 21 July 1030 Died: 1112/13
Regnal titles
Preceded by Saw Lu	King of Burma; 1084–1112/13	Succeeded by Sithu I
