= Emanuel Forchhammer =

Swiss Archaeologist and Pali scholar

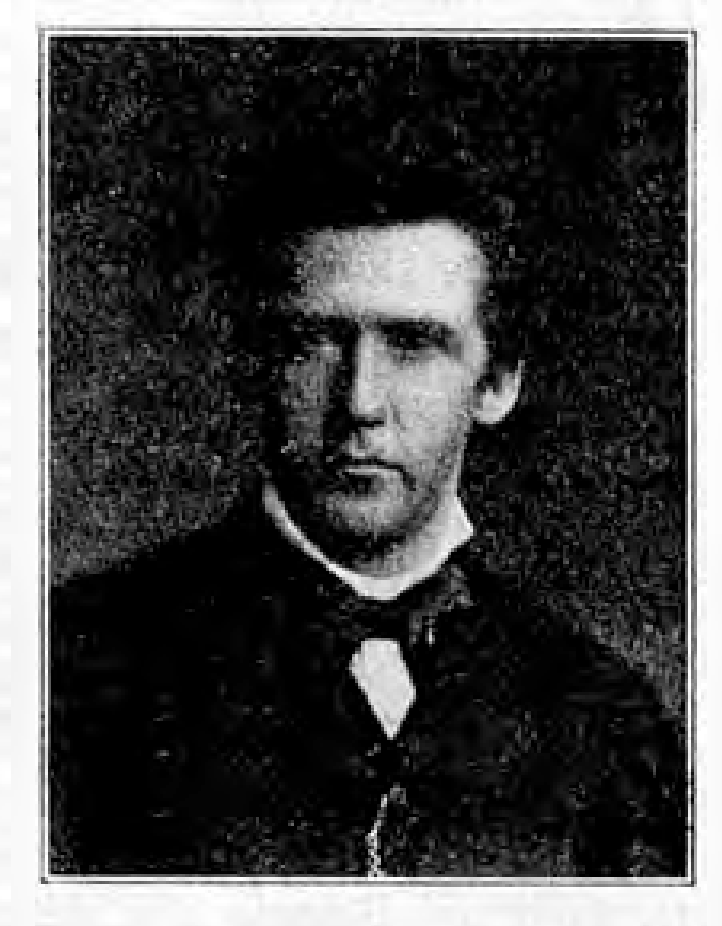
- Emanuel Forchhammer
- Born: March 12, 1851; St. Antönien Ascharina, Switzerland
- Died: February 26, 1890; Myingyan, Burma
- Occupations: Linguist, Teacher, Writer

Emanuel Forchhammer (12 March 1851 - April 26, 1890) was a Swiss indologist, Pāli specialist, orientalist and the first professor of Pali in Rangoon College. He was a pioneer in Burmese Archaeology.

== Early life ==
Forchhammer was born on 12 March 1851 in the town of St. Antönien Ascharina, Switzerland. He was the youngest son of Christian Gottlieb F. (1814–1859), a Lutheran minister, and Elisabeth Schlegel (1824–1891). After his father's death — when Emanuel was 8 — the family moved to nearby Chur. He had a brother, Theophil F., who would become a well-regarded organist in Magdeburg, and a sister, Emilie, who was a successful painter.

== Studies in the Americas and Europe ==
Forchhammer studied medicine in New York, where he also obtained a doctorate and became an assistant at a hospital in New Orleans. He then joined an expedition to collect information on the languages of Native Americans in Louisiana and Arkansas. He learned to speak the Choctaw language alongside Adrien Rouquette. In 1875, he returned to Europe, where he learned Armenian in the Armenian monastery of San Lazzaro near Venice and until 1878, studied oriental philology in Leipzig.

== Teaching and Research in Burma ==
In 1878, he was offered two academic positions. He rejected the offer of the Emperor of Brazil to survey Indian languages but he accepted the chair of Pāli at Rangoon College, becoming the country's first professor in Pali. He scoured the libraries of Buddhist monasteries with tireless zeal to collect manuscripts. In 1882, he became an Archaeological Inspector for British Burma, engaging in excavations and the decipherment of ancient inscriptions in Pāli, Mon, and Burmese.

Forchhammer studied various languages of Burma including Shan and Karen and carried out excavations and archaeological investigations particularly in the ancient temple cities of Arakan and Pagan.

Among his collaborators were Taw Sein Ko, described as the first archaeologist in Burma. Taw spoke highly of Dr. Forchhammer, recalling his academic idealism in a speech to the Old Rangoon Collegians’ Annual Dinner:

Dr. Forchhammer used to say that the worship of Minerva was infinitely better than the worship of Mammon and to keep alight the lamp of learning in our age of materialism was an act of high altruism.

Taw would later edit and publish many of Forchhammer's unpublished transcriptions of inscriptions in Pagan, Pinya, and Ava.

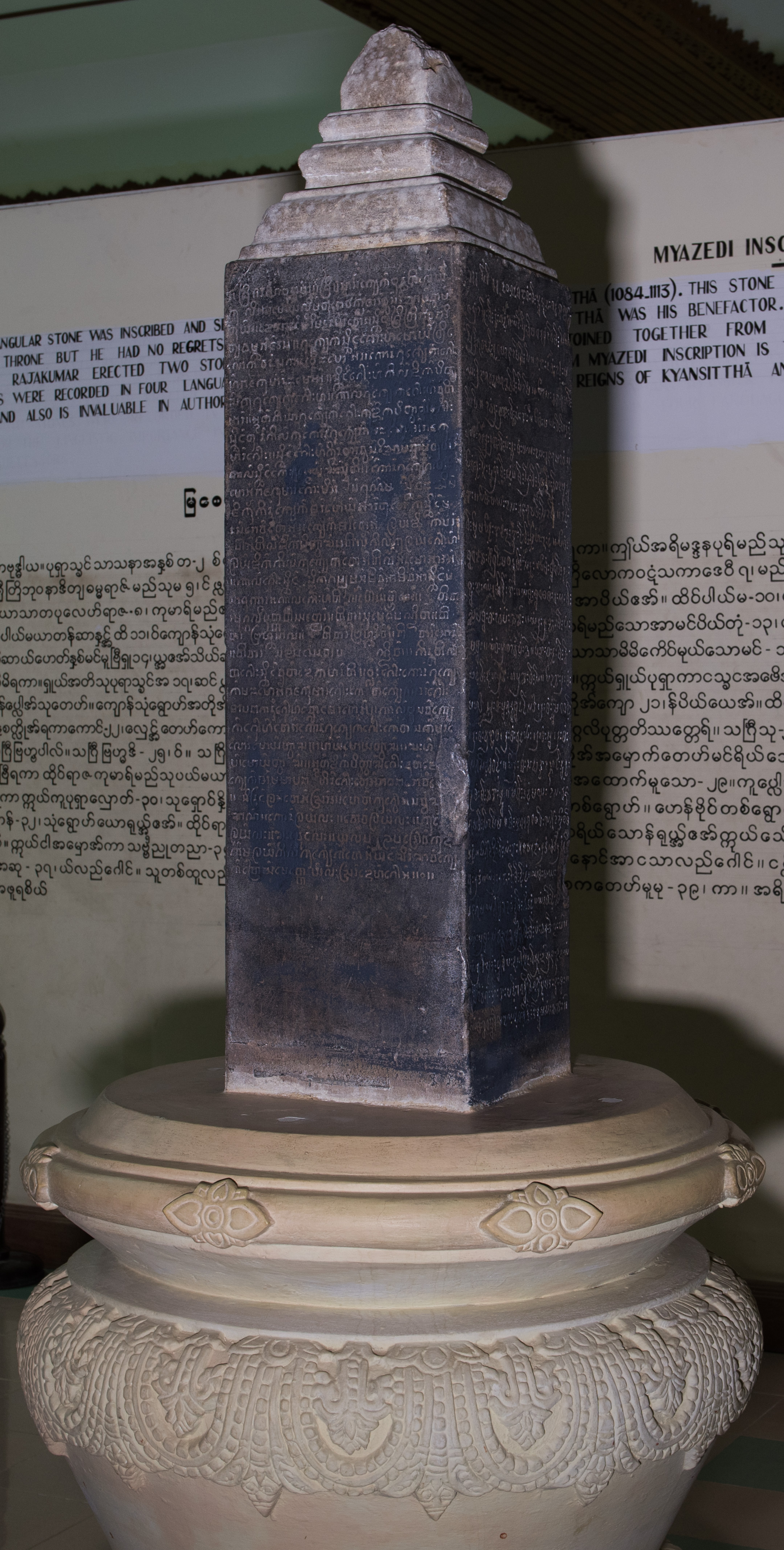
Myazedi pillar A

Forchhammer discovered two important quadrilingual stone pillars, originally subscribed in 1113C.E., in 1886-87 and 1904. Now known as the Myazedi inscriptions (A and B), exists on the platform of the Myazedi Pagoda, in the village of Myinkaba (south of Bagan), in Mandalay Division. The other was discovered by Forchhammer in 1886–1887 and is currently on display at the Bagan Archaeological Museum. The Myazedi inscription is recognised as Memory of the World Register by UNESCO.

Forchhammer discovered two important quadrilingual stone pillars, originally inscribed in 1113 C.E., during his work in Burma. One, now known as the Myazedi inscription A, stands on the platform of the Myazedi Pagoda in the village of Myinkaba (just south of Bagan, in today's Mandalay Region). The other, often called Myazedi inscription B, was unearthed by Forchhammer in 1886–1887 and is now housed in the Bagan Archaeological Museum. Together they are referred to as the Myazedi inscriptions and are listed on the Memory of the World Register by UNESCO. The inscriptions are important as the contain the earliest known inscription in the Burmese language, and also served as a Rosetta Stone for deciphering the Pyu script, which enabled historical writings in the Pyu language to be read.

== Works ==
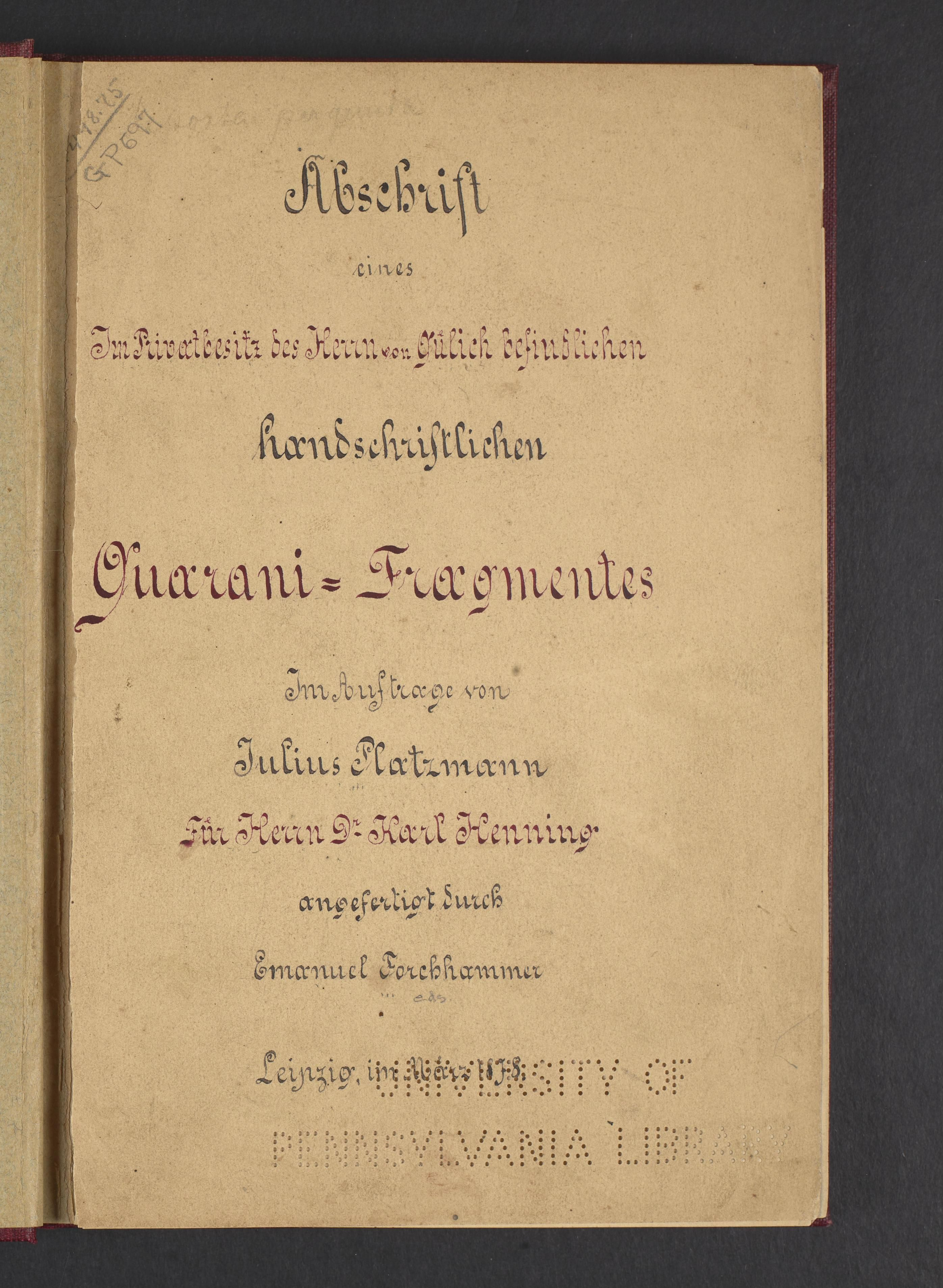
Title page of a manuscript in the Guaraní that was hand-copied by Forchhammer for Karl Henning, the personal tutor of Pedro II of Brazil.

Forchhammer collaborated with various scholars of American languages, including Julius Platzmann and Karl Henning, the latter being the personal tutor and secretary of Pedro II of Brazil.

He published an account of the ancient manuscripts collected by him in Burma (1882), Notes on the Early History, the Geography, the Languages & Dialects, the Brahmans & Sanskrit Literature, of British Burma (1883–84), Sources and Development of Burmese Law (1885), a contribution to Jardine's Notes on Buddhist Law (1882–83), and treatises on the Burmese languages in the "Indian Antiquary". He left behind much that remains unpublished.

- Emanuel Forchhammer (1883). Notes on the Early History, the Geography, the Languages & Dialects, the Brahmans & Sanskrit Literature, of British Burma by Em. Fochhammer, Ph.D. 1883-85. Rangoon : Govt. Press.
- Forchhammer, Emanuel (1885). The Jardine Prize Essay: On the Sources and Development of Burmese Law. Rangoon: Printed at the Government press.
- Forchhammer, Emanuel (1892). Report on the Antiquities of Arakan (PDF). Rangoon: Superintendent of Government Printing.
- Forchhammer, Emanuel (1892). The Inscriptions of Pagan, Pinya and Ava: Translation with Notes. Rangoon: Government Press.
- Forchhammer, Emanuel (1892). The Manu Kyay Dhammathat, or Wareru Dhammathat. Rangoon: Government Press.
