= A History of the Pyu Alphabet =

Alphabets of the language of pyu

A History of Pyu Alphabet
- Second edition cover
- Author: Tha Myat
- Cover artist: Thaung Hla (first edition), Thaw Thein Gar (second edition)
- Language: Burmese, Pyu
- Genre: linguistic
- Publisher: National Publishing Works
- Publication date: 1963
- Publication place: Burma (Myanmar)
- Media type: Print (paperback)
- Pages: 89 (second edition)

A History of the Pyu Alphabet (Burmese: ပျူအက္ခရာသမိုင်း) is a book on the Pyu language first published in 1963 by Tha Myat.

== Research ==
The author Tha Myat studied Indian and Southeast Asian stone inscriptions before writing the book. It took about ten years for him to understand the Pyu writing and to reveal the denotations of Pyu alphabets.

== Publications ==
=== First edition ===
The book was first published in 1963. (Note: It was published 9 years before the publication of The Biography of Myanmar Alphabets.) It was published by National Publishing Works. Tha Myat presented his interpretations of the Pyu portions of the Myazedi Inscription, as well as of other Pyu inscriptions. However, because his translations lacked precision, the Burma historian G.H. Luce called them "tentative".

=== Second printing ===
The second printing of 500 copies was published in December 2011 by Gangaw Wutyee Publishing House.

== Content ==
The book covers the Pyu alphabet and numerals, and includes Romanized transcriptions of sample ancient Pyu stone inscriptions. The book also includes Kamawa (Burmese Buddhist scriptures) and the Mangala Sutta in Pyu.

=== Table of contents ===
1. Combination of vowels with consonants
2. Various Forms of Alphabets
3. Conjunct Consonants
4. Halin Pyu
5. Sri Ksetra Pyu
6. Gupta Pyu
7. Pyu in Roman Characters
8. Hmawza Payagyigon Pyu manuscripts
9. The Myazedi inscription Page(A)
10. The Myazedi inscription Page(B)
11. Shwesandaw Pagoda, Bagan- Pyu Manuscript
12. Appendix

=== Language ===
The book's Pyu inscriptions were transcribed in modern Burmese, and at times also in the Latin alphabet. Their meaning was given in both Burmese and English.

== Reception ==
Historian Than Tun wrote in 1963:

I was surprised by Thandwe Pyu, the newest discovery of Pyu manuscript.
