= Tha Myat =

- သာမြတ်
- Born: 29 April 1899; Padigon, Pyay, Bago, British Burma
- Died: 24 November 1977 (aged 78); Yangon, Myanmar
- Education: University of Rangoon (M.A.); University of Bombay at Pune (B.Ag.)
- Known for: Pyu Reader
- Spouse: Daw Yee
- Awards: Thiri Pyanchi Gold Medal (1954)
- Scientific career
- Fields: Agriculture; Linguistics
- Workplaces: University of Yangon; University of Mandalay

Tha Myat (Burmese: သာမြတ်, pronounced [θà mjaʔ]; 29 April 1899 – 24 November 1977) was a linguist, known for his works on writing systems of Burma (Myanmar), notably on the Pyu language.

== Early life ==
Tha Myat was born on 29 April 1899 to a merchant family of Ngwe Thin (ငွေသင်) and Po Mya (ဘိုးမြ) in Padigon. He studied at his local monastery until 12 before leaving for Gyobingauk to continue schooling at R.C.M. St. Michael's School. There, during summer holidays, he studied Hindi reading and writing from an Indian man.

After completing 7th Standard, he then went on to study at Prome High School in Pyay. He passed the university matriculation examination with honors in English, Burmese and Pali. Then, he studied at Government College. In 1921, he finished intermediate college with honors, and received a scholarship to further study at Pune Agricultural College, then an affiliate college of the University of Bombay. He married Me Yee, daughter of Lu and Se, before leaving for India. He read agricultural economics and intensive farming, graduating with a bachelor's degree in agriculture in 1924. He received F.R.H.S. and M.R.Ag.S. degrees from the Royal Horticultural Society, London.

== Career ==
Upon his return from India in 1924, he joined the Department of Agriculture. He served as Agricultural Deputy Commissioner of Magway Division for 14 years. It was there that he began to take interest in the Burmese language, and began researching on the language. In 1954, he retired as Director of Dekkhina Circle, and became the Director of Cultural Institute, Rangoon. In that same year, he was awarded the Thiri Pyanchi Gold Medal by the government.

On 23 December 1957, he received an honorary degree from Rangoon University. Throughout the 1950s, Tha Myat represented the country at a number of state missions to several countries, including India, Pakistan, the Soviet Union, Poland, Czechoslovakia, Romania, East Germany, West Germany, Britain, France, Yugoslavia, Italy and Egypt.

== Associations ==
Tha Myat was a member of Thukhamein team of the Burma Translation Society. In 1953, he was vice president of the Burma Science Association. In 1958, he became president of the Burma-India Culture Association and a member of the council of University for Adult Education. He took part in that council for 11 years and served as president from 1961 to 1964. In 1968, he was elected president of the Burma Research Society. He also served as vice president, and later as president of the Tharay Khittaya Association.

== Works ==
Tha Myat published several works mostly in Burmese, under the name of ဦးသာမြတ်, which is typically anglicized as "U Tha Myat". In academic records, his name is typically Romanized as Ūʺ Sā Mrat' (according to the Library of Congress ALA-LC transcription system for Burmese).

=== Published books ===
| No | Name of the book | Genre | Language | Publication date |
|---|---|---|---|---|
| 1 | Burmese Writing System | | Burmese | 1948 |
| 2 | History of Mon and Burmese Alphabets | Linguistics | | 1956 |
| 3 | Pyu Hpat-Sa (Pyu Reader) | Linguistics | English, Myanmar | 8, 11, 1963 |
| 4 | The Myazeidi Pyu Inscription | Linguistics | English, Burmese | |
| 5 | Myazeidi Yazakumah Inscription | Linguistics | Pali, Pyu, English, Burmese | |
| 6 | Pali Myazeidi Inscription | Linguistics | English, Burmese | 1958 |
| 7 | Myanmar Ekkhaya Hnint Ganan Thincha Htuppat (On the Burmese Alphabet and Mathematics) | Linguistics | | 1972 |
| 8 | Myanmar Ekkhaya Hnint Ganan Thincha Htuppat | Linguistics | Burmese | 1974 |
| 9 | Myanma Pwe-Taw La Mya | | | |
| 10 | The Twelve Festivals of Burma | | | 1973 |
| 11 | Niti Kyan Kyaw Dway Hna Phaw (Hsanakya Niti and Lawka Niti) | | | 1954, 1962 |
| 12 | Mingala Sutta | | Pali, Hindi, English, Burmese | |
| 13 | Planting vegetables | Agriculture | | |
| 14 | Planting Fruit Trees | Agriculture | | |
| 15 | Planting vegetables and fruit trees | Agriculture | | |
| 16 | Growing a Kitchen Garden | Agriculture | | |
| 17 | Pawrana Zaga Dictionary | | | 1961 |
| 18 | The Ancient Pyu | | | |
| 19 | Sanskrit Language | | Burmese | 7, 6, 1960 |
| 20 | Foundation of Mandalay, the Royal Capital | History | Burmese | 1959 |
| 21 | Myanma Salon Paung Letswe | | | 1961 |
| 22, …… | Agriculture handouts for Standard 5, 6, 7 | | | |

=== Unpublished works ===
- Burmese Etymology

==== Lectures ====
| No | Name of the Lecture | Language | Status |
| 1 | Mingala Sutta | Pali, Hindi, Burmese, English | Published |
| 2 | Burmese Embroidery | | Published |
| 3 | Gold Leaf Industry | | Published |
| 4 | Work in Brass, Copper and Marble | | Published |
| 5 | Indian and Southeast Asian Inscriptions | | Unpublished |

=== As coauthor, editor ===
| Writers | Name of the book | Genre | Language | Publication date |
|---|---|---|---|---|
| U San Khin and U Tha Myat | A dictionary of Medicinal Plants in 11 Languages | | Burmese, English, Hindi, Pali, Kachin, Karen, Chin, Mon, Shan, Sanskrit, Russian | 1972 |
| U San Khin (edited by U Tha Myat) | Some Medicinal and Useful Plants, Both Indigenous and Exotic, of Burma: (botanical, English and Burmese Names and Family. Medicinal Plants are Marked with Asterisks) | Botany, Medical | | 1970 |

| Voice Actor | Name of Research Paper | Researchers |
| 1 | Lecture Notes on Burmese Handicraft and Burmese Manuscript Books, Southern and Northern Scripts of India | U Tha Myat and Min Thu Wun |
| 2 | The alphabets of Burma | U Tha Myat and John Sydenham Furnivall |

== Death ==
Tha Myat died on 24 November 1977 in Yangon.

== See also ==
- List of Burmese writers
- List of linguists
