= Marc Miyake =

American linguist (born 1971)

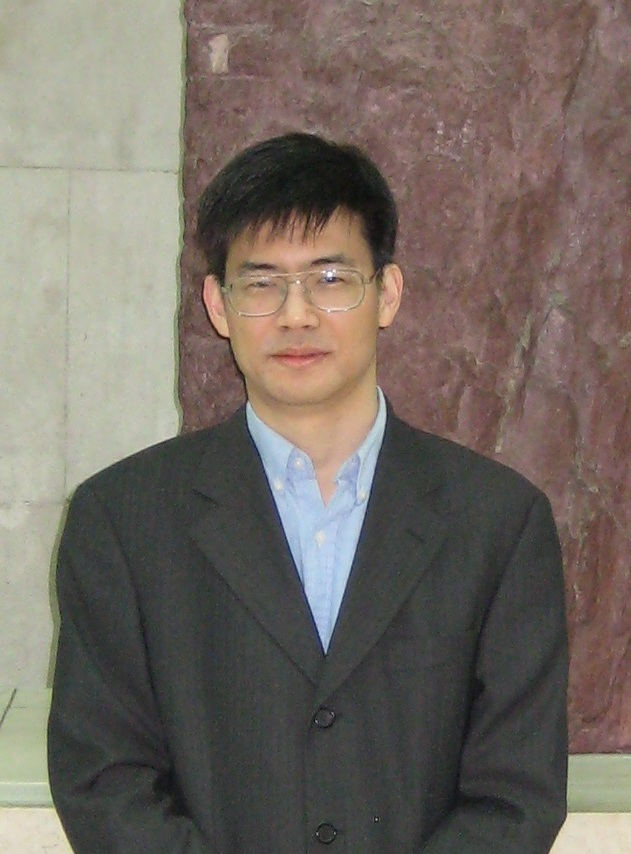
- Miyake at the British Museum in 2015
- Born: July 28, 1971 (age 55) ʻAiea, Hawaii, U.S.

Academic background
- Education: University of California, Berkeley (B.A.); University of Hawaii at Manoa (M.A., Ph.D.)
- Thesis: The Phonology of Eighth-Century Japanese Revisited: Another Reconstruction Based upon Written Records (1999)
- Doctoral advisor: Alexander Vovin

Academic work
- Discipline: Linguist
- Institutions: British Museum; SOAS
- Main interests: Old Japanese; Tangut; Pyu
- Website: www.amritas.com

Marc Hideo Miyake (三宅 英雄, Miyake Hideo; born July 28, 1971) is an American linguist who specializes in historical linguistics, particularly the study of Old Japanese and Tangut.

== Biography ==
Miyake was born in ʻAiea, Hawaii, in 1971, and attended Punahou School in Honolulu, graduating in 1989. He studied Japanese language and literature at University of California, Berkeley, and then studied linguistics at the University of Hawaii at Manoa, earning his doctorate in 1999 under Alexander Vovin, with a dissertation entitled The Phonology of Eighth-Century Japanese Revisited: Another Reconstruction Based upon Written Records. He is best known for his work on the phonetic reconstruction of Old Japanese, but is also known for his work on the extinct Tangut language.

Between 2015 and 2019, Miyake was a research assistant at the British Museum, working on the decipherment of Pyu inscriptions. At the same time he was also a research associate in the Department of Linguistics at the School of Oriental and African Studies.

== Works ==
- Miyake, Marc Hideo (2003). Old Japanese: A Phonetic Reconstruction. London and New York: RoutledgeCurzon. ISBN 0-415-30575-6.
- Miyake, Marc Hideo (2003). "Philological evidence for *e and *o in Pre-Old Japanese". Diachronica. 20 (1): 83–137. doi:10.1075/dia.20.1.06miy.
- Miyake, Marc Hideo (2006). "Kana's Korean origins". In Françoise Bottéro & Redouane Djamouri (eds.), Ecriture chinoise: données, usages et représentations, pp. 185–205. Paris: CRLAO. ISBN 2-910216-08-X.
- Miyake, Marc Hideo (2012). "Complexity from Compression: a Sketch of Pre-Tangut". In Irina Fedorovna Popova (ed.), Тангуты в Центральной Азии: сборник статей в честь 80-летия проф. Е.И.Кычанова [Tanguts in Central Asia: a collection of articles marking the 80th anniversary of Prof. E. I. Kychanov], pp. 244–261. Moscow: Oriental Literature. ISBN 978-5-02-036505-6.
- Miyake, Marc (2017). "Loanwords, Pre-Qín", in: Encyclopedia of Chinese Language and Linguistics, Vol 2, Rint Sybesma et al., eds., pp. 650-653. Leiden: Brill.
- Miyake, Marc (2017). "Loanwords, Post-Qín, Premodern", in: Encyclopedia of Chinese Language and Linguistics, Vol 2, Rint Sybesma et al., eds., pp. 647-650. Leiden: Brill.
- Griffiths, Arlo; Hudson, Bob; Miyake, Marc; Wheatley, Julian K. (2017). "Studies in Pyu Epigraphy, I: State of the Field, Edition and Analysis of the Kan Wet Khaung Mound Inscription, and Inventory of the Corpus". Bulletin de l'École française d'Extrême-Orient. 103: 43–205. doi:10.3406/befeo.2017.6247.
- Miyake, Marc (2018). "Studies in Pyu Phonology, ii: Rhymes" (PDF). Bulletin of Chinese Linguistics. 11 (1–2): 37–76. doi:10.1163/2405478X-01101008.
- Miyake, Marc (2019). "A first look at Pyu grammar". Linguistics of the Tibeto-Burman Area. 42 (2): 150–221. doi:10.1075/ltba.18013.miy. S2CID 213553247.
