= Mon language =

Austroasiatic language

Mon
- ဘာသာမန်
- Pronunciation: [pʰɛ̤ːsaː mɔ̤ːn]
- Native to: Myanmar: Mon State; Kayin State; Tanintharyi Region
- Region: Lower Myanmar
- Ethnicity: Mon
- Native speakers: (1.1 million cited 2000–2014)
- Language family: Austroasiatic: Monic; Mon
- Writing system: Mon–Burmese (Mon alphabet)

Official status
- Recognised minority language in: Myanmar; Thailand

Language codes
- ISO 639-3: Either: mnw – Modern Mon omx – Old Mon=
- Glottolog: monn1252 Modern Mon oldm1242 Old Mon
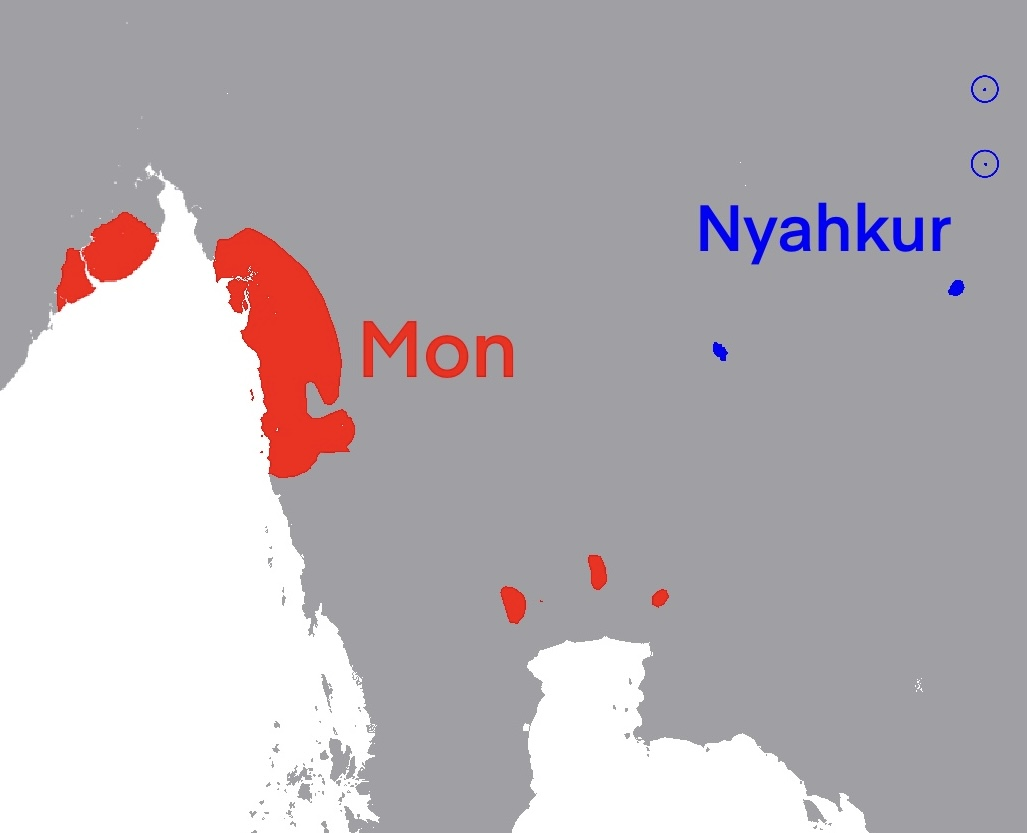
- Distribution of Monic languages in Thailand and Myanmar, where Mon is denoted in red.

The Mon language, (Note: Mon: ဘာသာမန် [pʰɛ̤ːsaː mɔ̤ːn]; Burmese: မွန်ဘာသာစကား; Thai: ภาษามอญ) formerly known as Peguan and Talaing, is an Austroasiatic language spoken by the Mon people. Mon, like the related Khmer language, but unlike most languages in mainland Southeast Asia, is not tonal. The Mon language is a recognised indigenous language in Myanmar as well as an indigenous language of Thailand.

Mon was classified as a "vulnerable" language in UNESCO's 2010 Atlas of the World’s Languages in Danger. The Mon language has faced assimilative pressures in both Myanmar and Thailand, where many individuals of Mon descent are now monolingual in Burmese or Thai respectively. In 2007, Mon speakers were estimated to number between 1,800,000 and 2 million. In Myanmar, the majority of Mon speakers live in Southern Myanmar, especially Mon State, followed by Tanintharyi Region and Kayin State.

== History ==
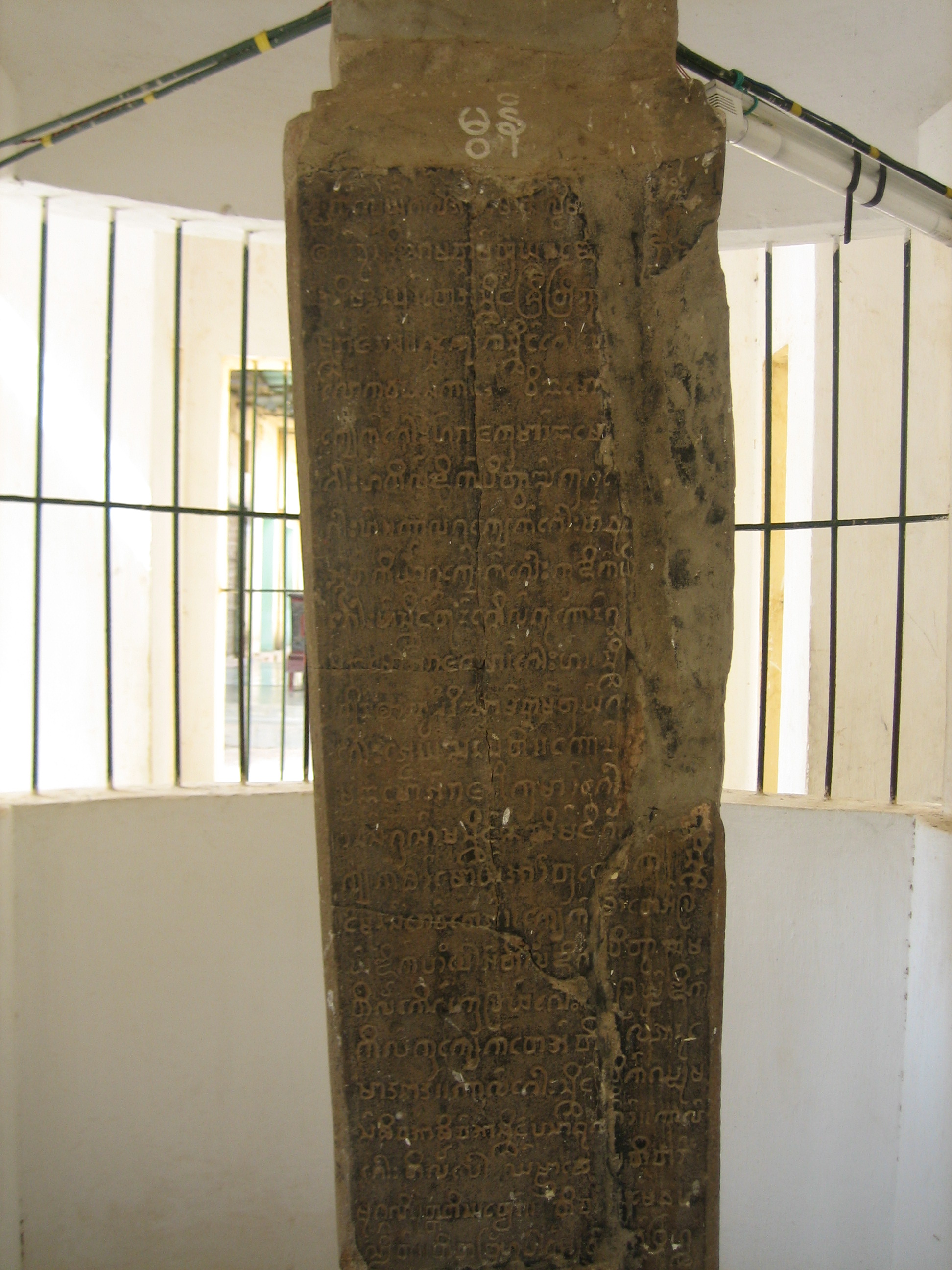
The Mon Myazedi Inscription (AD 1113) is Myanmar's oldest surviving stone inscription.

Mon is an important language in Burmese history. Until the 12th century, it was the lingua franca of the Irrawaddy valley—not only in the Mon kingdoms of the lower Irrawaddy but also of the upriver Pagan Kingdom of the Bamar people. Mon, especially written Mon, continued to be a prestige language even after the fall of the Mon kingdom of Thaton to Pagan in 1057. King Kyansittha of Pagan (r. 1084–1113) admired Mon culture and the Mon language was patronized.

Kyansittha left many inscriptions in Mon. During this period, the Myazedi inscription, which contains identical inscriptions of a story in Pali, Pyu, Mon and Burmese on the four sides, was carved. However, after Kyansittha's death, usage of the Mon language declined among the Bamar and the Burmese language began to replace Mon and Pyu as a lingua franca.

Mon inscriptions from Dvaravati's ruins also litter Thailand. However it is not clear if the inhabitants were Mon, a mix of Mon and Malay or Khmer. Later inscriptions and kingdoms like Lavo were subservient to the Khmer Empire.

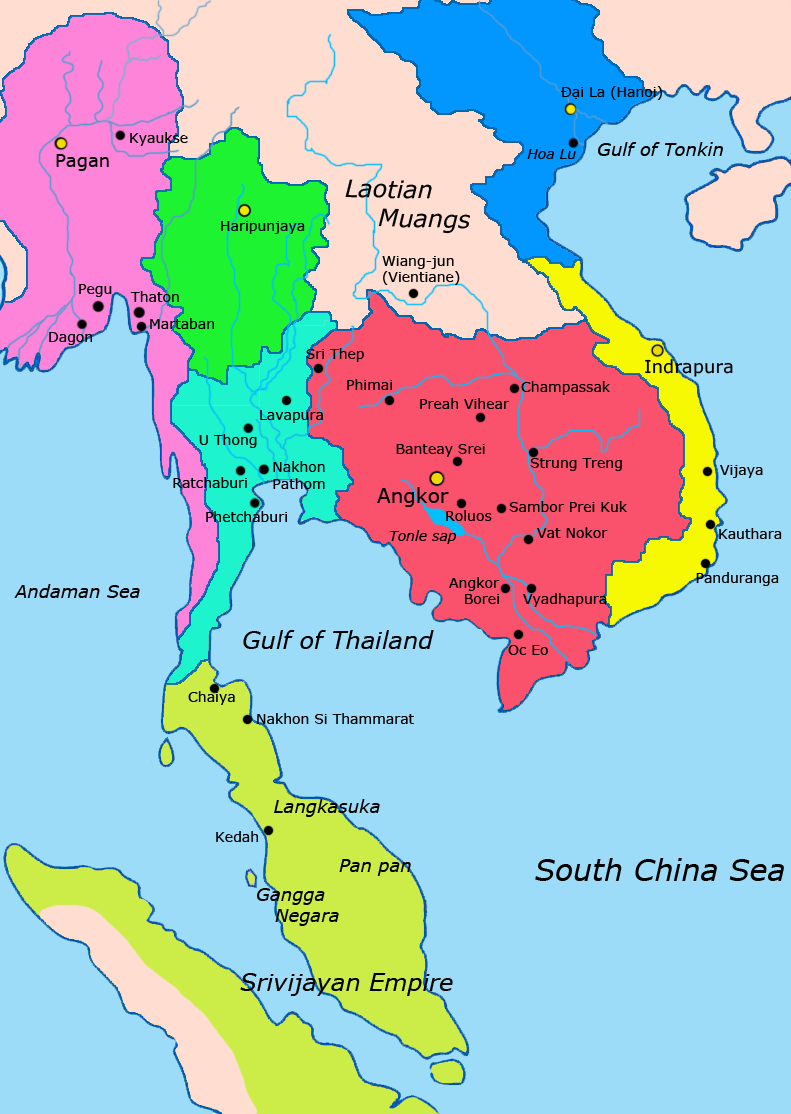
Map of mainland Southeast Asia c. 1000–1100 CE, showing the Mon kingdoms of Haripuñjaya (green) and Lavo (light blue), where Old Mon language was spoken.

After the fall of Pagan, Mon again became the lingua franca of the Hanthawaddy kingdom (1287–1539) in present-day Lower Myanmar, which remained a predominantly Mon-speaking region until the 1800s, by which point, the Burmese language had expanded its reach from its traditional heartland in Upper Burma into Lower Burma.

The region's language shift from Mon to Burmese has been ascribed to a combination of population displacement, intermarriage, and voluntary changes in self-identification among increasingly Mon–Burmese bilingual populations in throughout Lower Burma. The shift was certainly accelerated by the fall of the Mon-speaking Restored Hanthawaddy Kingdom in 1757. Following the fall of Pegu (now Bago), many Mon-speaking refugees fled and resettled in what is now modern-day Thailand. By 1830, an estimated 90% of the population in the Lower Burma self-identified as Burmese-speaking Bamars; huge swaths of former Mon-speaking areas, from the Irrawaddy Delta upriver, spanning Bassein (now Pathein) and Rangoon (now Yangon) to Tharrawaddy, Toungoo, Prome (now Pyay) and Henzada (now Hinthada), were now Burmese-speaking. Great Britain's gradual annexation of Burma throughout the 19th century, in addition to concomitant economic and political instability in Upper Burma (e.g., increased tax burdens to the Burmese crown, British rice production incentives, etc.) also accelerated the migration of Burmese speakers from Upper Burma into Lower Burma.

The Mon language has influenced subtle grammatical differences between the varieties of Burmese spoken in Lower and Upper Burma. In Lower Burmese varieties, the verb ပေး ("to give") is colloquially used as a permissive causative marker, like in other Southeast Asian languages, but unlike in other Tibeto-Burman languages. This usage is hardly employed in Upper Burmese varieties, and is considered a sub-standard construct.

In 1972, the New Mon State Party (NMSP) established a Mon national school system, which uses Mon as a medium of instruction, in rebel-controlled areas. The system was expanded throughout Mon State following a ceasefire with the central government in 1995. Mon State now operates a multi-track education system, with schools either using Mon as the primary medium of instruction (called Mon national schools) offering modules on the Mon language in addition to the government curriculum (called "mixed schools"). In 2015, Mon language courses were launched state-wide at the elementary level. This system has been recognized as a model for mother-tongue education in the Burmese national education system, because it enables children taught in the Mon language to integrate into the mainstream Burmese education system at higher education levels.

In 2013, it was announced that the Mawlamyine-based Thanlwin Times would begin to carry news in the Mon language, becoming Myanmar's first Mon language publication since 1962.

== Geographic distribution ==
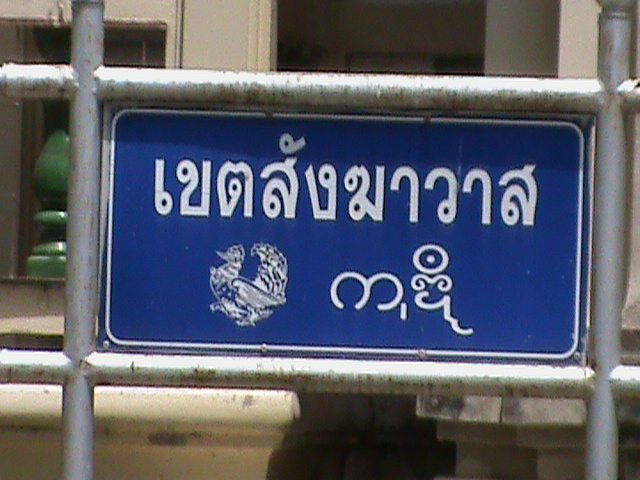
Mon scripts on a sign in Wat Muang, Thailand.

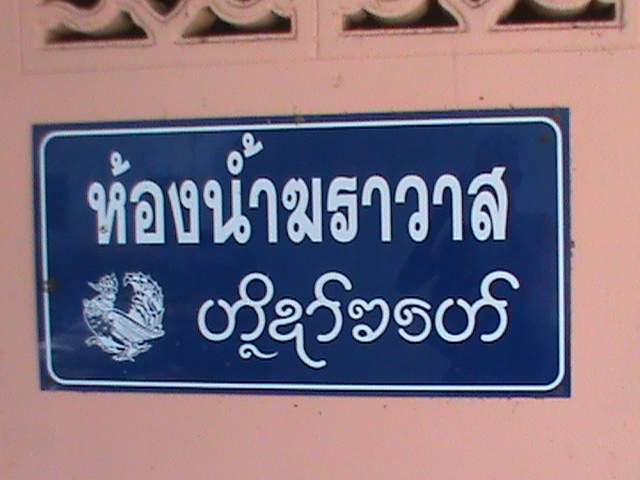
Mon scripts on a sign in Wat Muang, Thailand.

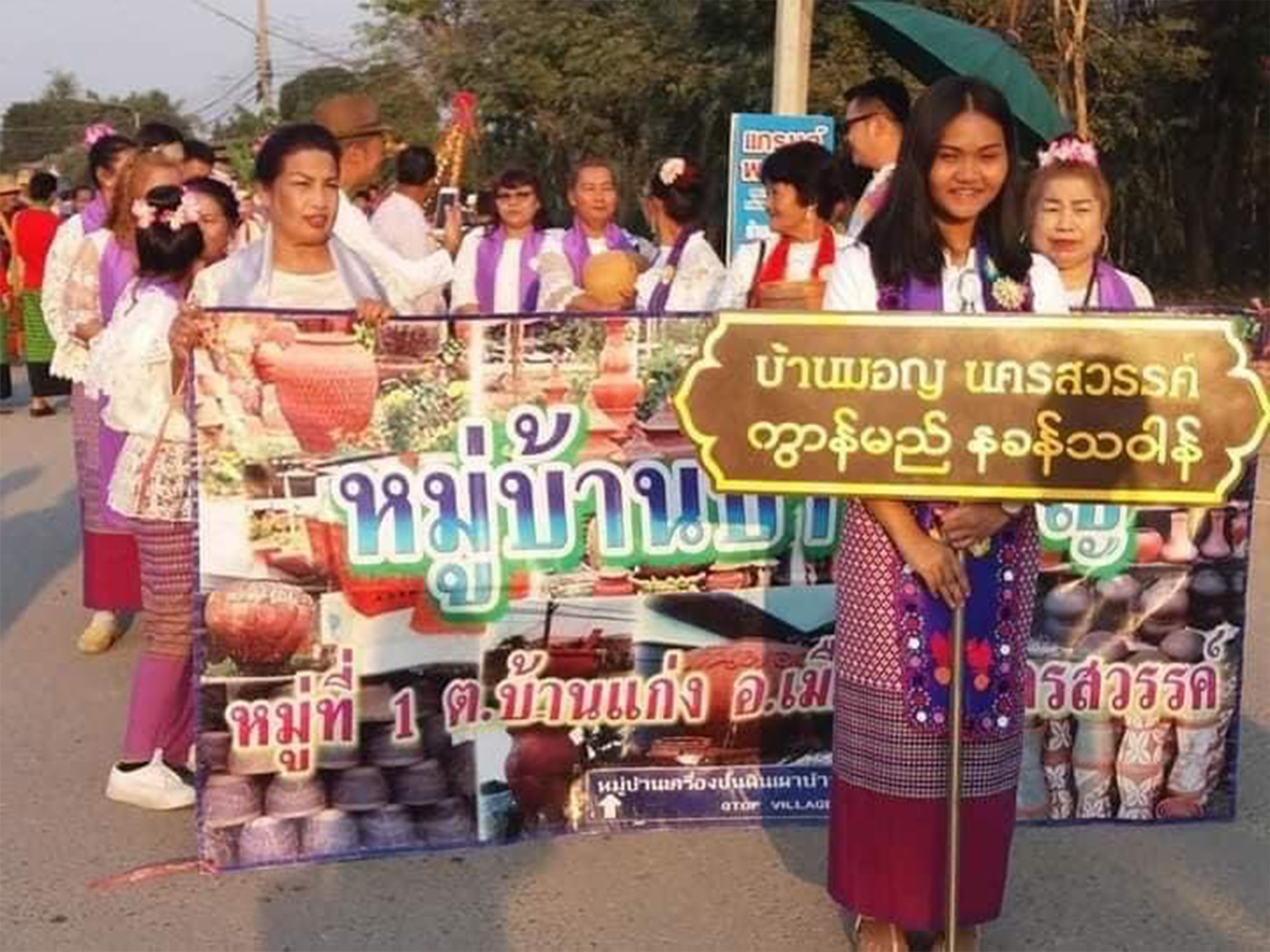
Mon language in Thailand.

Mon language in Burma.

Southern Myanmar (comprising Mon State, Kayin State, and Tanintharyi Region), from the Sittaung River in the north to Myeik (Mergui) and Kawthaung in the south, remains a traditional stronghold of the Mon language. However, in this region, Burmese is favored in urban areas, such as Mawlamyine, the capital of Mon State. In recent years, usage of Mon has declined in Myanmar, especially among the younger generation.

While Thailand is home to a sizable Mon population due to historical waves of migration, only a small proportion (estimated to range between 60,000 and 80,000) speak Mon, due to Thaification and the assimilation of Mons into mainstream Thai society. Mon speakers in Thailand are largely concentrated in Ko Kret. The remaining contingent of Thai Mon speakers are located in the provinces of Samut Sakhon, Samut Songkhram, Nakhon Pathom, as well the western provinces bordering Myanmar (Kanchanaburi, Phetchaburi, Prachuap Khiri Khan, and Ratchaburi). A small ethnic group in Thailand speak a language closely related to Mon, called Nyah Kur. They are descendants of the Mon-speaking Dvaravati kingdom.

== Dialects ==
Mon has three primary dialects in Burma, coming from the various regions the Mon inhabit. They are the Central (areas surrounding Mottama and Mawlamyine), Bago, and Ye dialects. All are mutually intelligible. Ethnologue lists Mon dialects as Martaban-Moulmein (Central Mon, Mon Te), Pegu (Mon Tang, Northern Mon), and Ye (Mon Nya, Southern Mon), with high mutual intelligibility among them.

Thai Mon has some differences from the Burmese dialects of Mon, but they are mutually intelligible. The Thai varieties of Mon are considered "severely endangered."

== Phonology ==
Explanation on the Mon alphabet

Explanation of the Mon-Thai or Thai-Raman alphabet

=== Consonants ===
		Bilabial	Dental	Palatal	Velar	Glottal
Nasal		m	n	ɲ	ŋ	
Stop	unaspirated	p	t	c	k	ʔ
Stop	aspirated	pʰ	tʰ	cʰ	kʰ	
Stop	implosive	ɓ~b^{2}	ɗ~d^{2}			
Fricative			s	ç^{1}		h
Sonorant		w	r	j		
Lateral			l			

1. /ç/ is only found in Burmese loans.
2. Implosives are lost in many dialects and become explosives instead.

=== Vowels ===
	Front	Central	Back
Close	i		u
Close-mid	e	ə	o
Open-mid	ɛ	ɐ	ɔ
Open	æ	a	

=== Vocalic register ===
Unlike the surrounding Burmese and Thai languages, Mon is not a tonal language. As in many Mon–Khmer languages, Mon uses a vowel-phonation or vowel-register system in which the quality of voice in pronouncing the vowel is phonemic. There are two registers in Mon:

1. Clear (modal) voice, analyzed by various linguists as ranging from ordinary to creaky
2. Breathy voice, vowels have a distinct breathy quality

One study involving speakers of a Mon dialect in Thailand found that in some syllabic environments, words with a breathy voice vowel are significantly lower in pitch than similar words with a clear vowel counterpart. While difference in pitch in certain environments was found to be significant, there are no minimal pairs that are distinguished solely by pitch. The contrastive mechanism is the vowel phonation.

In the examples below, breathy voice is marked with under-diaeresis.

== Syntax ==
=== Pronouns ===
Mon	Translate
အဲ	I
ဒဒက်တဴကဵုအဲ	my, mine
ဟိုန်အဲ	me
မိန်အဲ	by me
ကုအဲ	from me
ပိုဲ	we
ဟိုန်ပိုဲ	us
ဒဒက်တဴကဵုပိုဲ	our, ours, of us
ကုပိုဲ	to us
မိန်ပိုဲညးဂမၠိုၚ်	by us
နူပိုဲညးဂမၠိုၚ်	from us
တၠအဲ၊ ဗှေ်	you; thou
ဒဒက်တဴကဵုတၠအဲ	you, yours; thy, thine
ဟိုန်တၠအဲ	you; thee
မိန်တၠအဲ	by you (Sin); by thee
နူတၠအဲ	from you
ကုတၠအဲ	to you
ၚ်မၞးတံညးဂမၠိုၚ်	you
ဟိုန်မၞးတံ	you (object)
ဒဒက်တဴကဵုမၞးတံ	your, yours
ကုမၞးတံ	to you
မိန်မၞးတံ	by you
နူမၞးတံ	from you
ၚ်ညးဂှ်	he
ဒဒက်တဴကဵုညးဂှ်	his
ဟိုန်ညးဂှ်	him
ကုညးဂှ်	to him
နူညးဂှ်	from him
ၚ်ညးတံဂှ်	they
ဟိုန်ညးတံဂှ်	them
ဒဒက်တဴကဵုညးတံဂှ်	their, theirs
ကုညးတံဂှ်	to them
မိန်ညးတံဂှ်	by them
နူညးတံဂှ်	from them
ၚ်ညးဗြဴဂှ်	she
ကုညးဗြဴဂှ်	her, hers
မိန်ညးဗြဴဂှဲ၊ပ္ဍဲ	by her; in her
နူညးဗြဴဂှ်	from her
ၚ်ဗြဴတံဂှ်	they (feminine)
ဟိုန်ညးဗြဴတံဂှ်	their, theirs
ကုညးဗြဴတံဂှ်	to them
နူညးဗြဴတံဂှ်	from them
ပ္ဍဲညးဗြဴတံဂှ်	in them

=== Verbs and verb phrases ===
Mon verbs do not inflect for person. Tense is shown through particles.

Some verbs have a morphological causative, which is most frequently a /pə-/ prefix (Pan Hla 1989:29):

Underived verb	Gloss	Causative verb	Gloss
ချိုတ် [kʰjɒt]	to die	ဂစိုတ် [həcɒt]	to kill
လီု [lɤ̤m]	to be ruined	ပလီု [pəlɒm]	to destroy
ခိုင် [kʰaɨŋ]	to be firm	ပခိုၚ် [pəkhaɨŋ]	to make firm
တီ [tɛm]	to know	ပတီ [pətɛm]	to inform

=== Nouns and noun phrases ===
==== Singular and plural ====
Mon nouns do not inflect for number. That is, they do not have separate forms for singular and plural:

{sɔt pakaw} mo̤a me̤a
apple one CL
'one apple'

{sɔt pakaw} ba me̤a
apple two CL
'two apples'

==== Adjectives ====
Adjectives follow the noun (Pan Hla p. 24):

prɛ̤a ce
woman beautiful
'beautiful woman'

==== Demonstratives ====
Demonstratives follow the noun:

ŋoa nɔʔ
day this
this day

==== Classifiers ====
Like many other Southeast Asian languages, Mon has classifiers which are used when a noun appears with a numeral. The choice of classifier depends on the semantics of the noun involved.

kaneh mo̤a tanəng
pen one CL
'one pen'

chup mo̤a tanɒm
tree one CL
'one tree'

=== Prepositions and prepositional phrases ===
Mon is a prepositional language.

doa əma
in lake
'in the lake'

=== Sentences ===
The ordinary word order for sentences in Mon is subject–verb–object, as in the following examples

အဲ ရာန် သ္ၚု တုဲ ယျ
ʔoa ran hau toa ya.
I buy rice COMPL AFF
'I bought rice.'

ညး တံ ဗ္တောန် ကဵု အဲ ဘာသာ အၚ်္ဂလိက်
Nyeh tɔʔ paton kɒ ʔua pʰɛ̤asa ʔengloit
3 PL teach to 1 language English
'They taught me English.'

=== Questions ===
Yes–no questions are shown with a final particle ha

ဗှ်ေ စ ပုင် တုဲ ယျ ဟာ
be̤ shea pəng toa ya ha?
you eat rice COMPL AFF Q
‘Have you eaten rice?’

အပါ အာ ဟာ
əpa a ha?
father go Q
‘Will father go?’ (Pan Hla, p. 42)

Wh-questions show a different final particle, rau. The interrogative word does not undergo wh-movement. That is, it does not necessarily move to the front of the sentence:

တၠ နာဲ ကြာတ်ကြဴမံင် မူ ရော
{Tala oa} kratkraw mu raw?
You wash what WH.Q
'What did you wash?'
