= Bagan Archaeological Museum =

- ရှေးဟောင်းသုတေသနပြတိုက် (ပုဂံ)
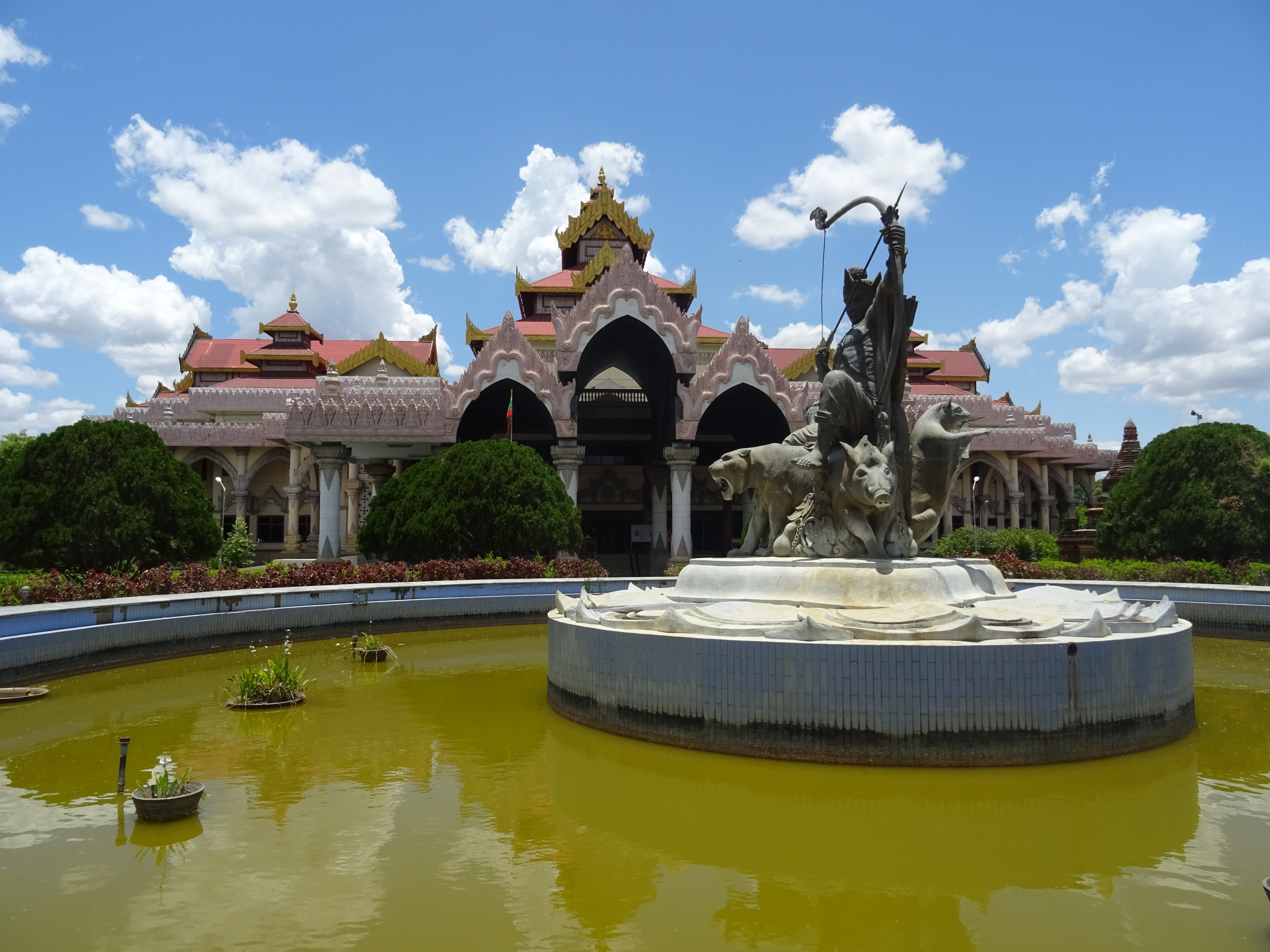
- Established: 1903; 123 years ago
- Location: Bagan, Myanmar
- Coordinates: 21°10′04″N 94°51′22″E
- Type: Archaeology museum
- Visitors: 295,284 (2019)

Bagan Archaeological Museum is located in Bagan, Myanmar. It was established in 1904, near the Ananda Temple and was reconstructed in 1938. The present-day three-story museum houses a number of rare Bagan period objects including the original Myazedi inscriptions, the Rosetta Stone of Burma.

== History ==
In 1901, the Governor General of India arrived in the Bagan region to prevent the destruction of ancient art works and ancient religious buildings. Emanuel Forchhammer, a professor of Pali at Rangoon College, was entrusted with the task of preserving it. In 1902, Taw Sein Ko, head of the Department of Inscriptions and Stones (now the Department of Archaeology), collected ancient stone inscriptions and artifacts from around Bagan. A small museum was built in 1903 to the north of the Ananda Temple, where ancient stone inscriptions were displayed. The museum was reconstructed in 1937-38.

During World War II, the museum's artifacts were buried underground to prevent them from being damaged. When Myanmar became independent, the Ministry of Culture started managing the museum. In 1952, the Ministry of Culture was established, which led efforts to unearth the artifacts. The new museum was opened in 1954.

A new octagonal-shaped museum building was constructed in 1979. In 1995, the present-day four-storey building was established. The museum opened on 17 April 1998. At the time of the construction of the building, the previous octagonal museum was kept, and the office of the Department of Archeology next to it was dismantled. According to State media report, a total of 295,284 local and foreign travellers visited the Bagan Archaeological Museum in the 2018-2019 fiscal year.

== Featured galleries ==
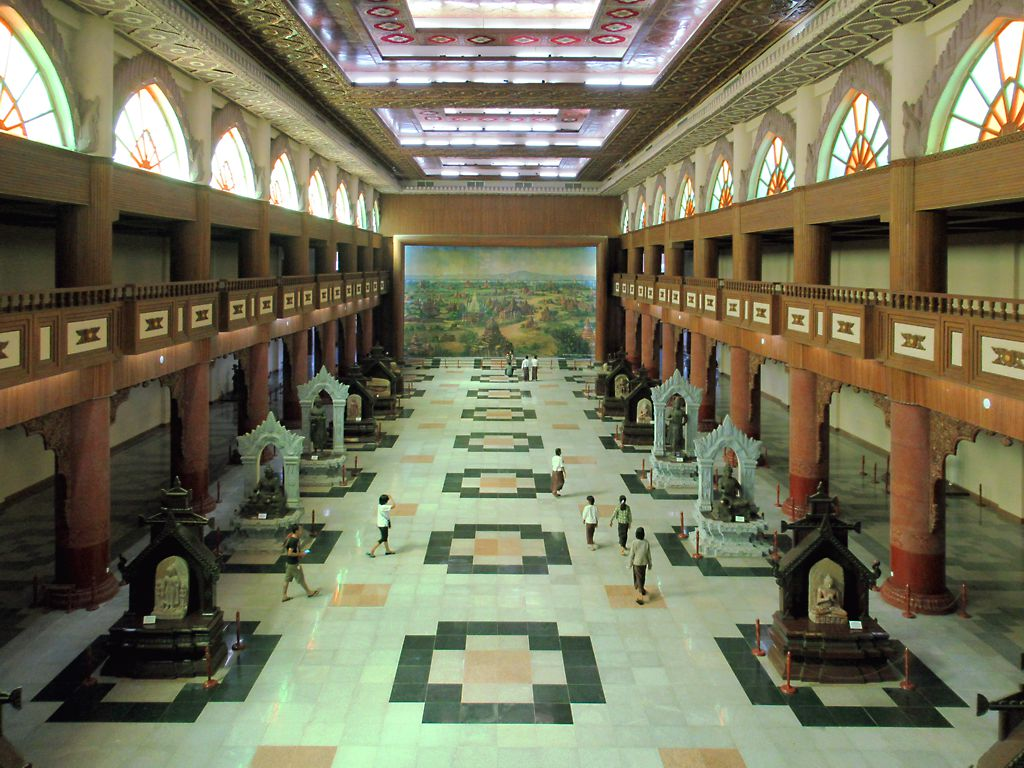
Inside of the museum

The galleries on display at the Bagan Archaeological Museum are:

- Special gallery
- Pagan Art Gallery
- Pagan period architecture gallery
- Pagan life gallery
- Pagan period literature gallery
- Pagan period Buddha statues
- Pagan period mural art gallery
