= Myazedi inscription =

Multilingual inscription

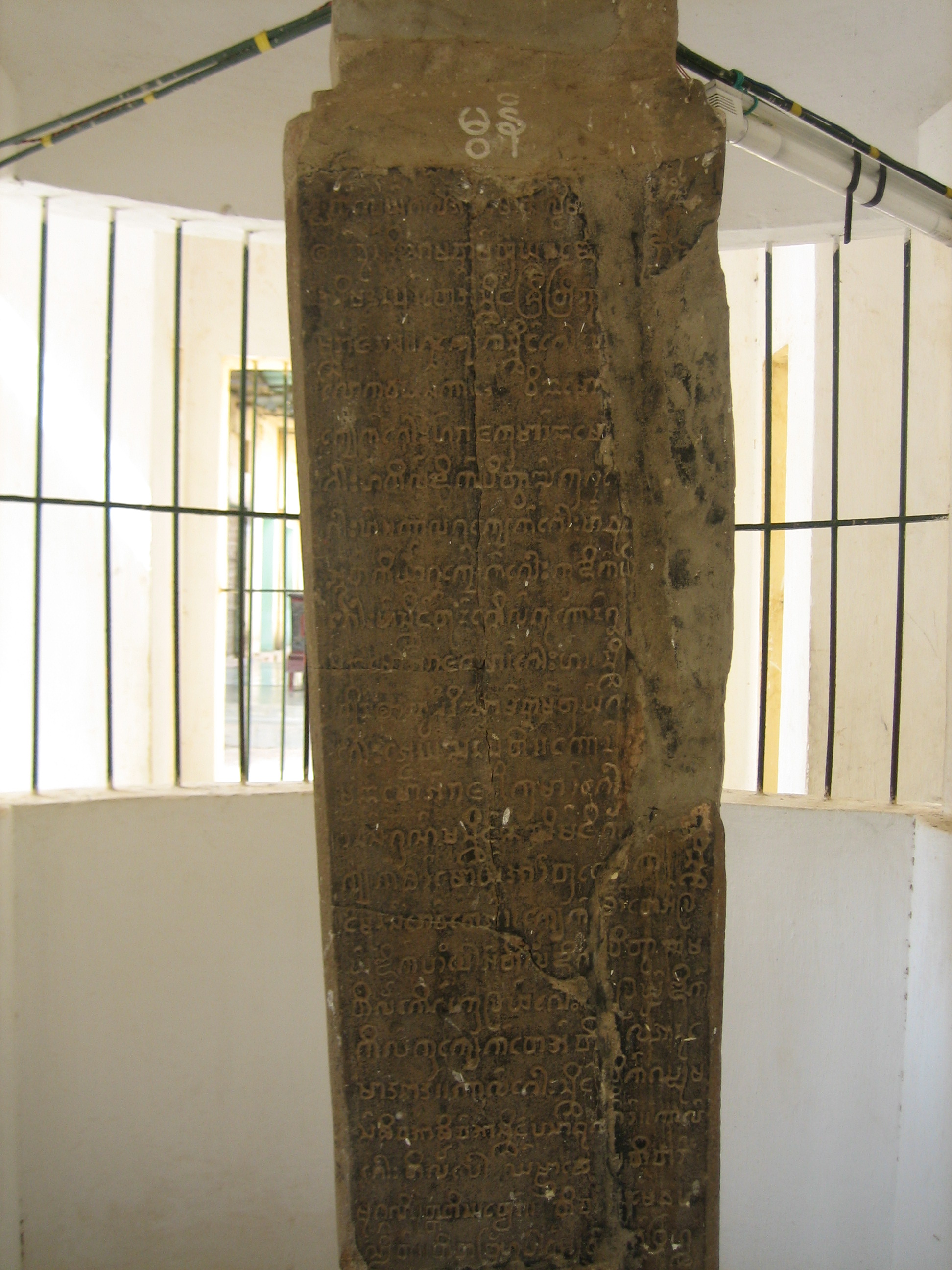
- Mon face of pillar B
- Material: stone
- Writing: Mon-Burmese script, Pyu script
- Created: 1113
- Discovered: 1886–1887
- Discovered by: Emanuel Forchhammer
- Present location: Bagan, Myanmar
- Language: Old Burmese, Pali, Old Mon and Pyu

The Myazedi inscription (Burmese: မြစေတီ ကျောက်စာ [mja̰ zèdì tɕaʊʔ sà]; also Yazakumar Inscription or the Gubyaukgyi Inscription), inscribed in 1113, is an inscription of the same proclamation in four languages: Old Burmese, Pali, Old Mon and Pyu. The four texts are found in nearly identical form on two stone pillars (A and B). They all tell the story of Prince Yazakumar and King Kyansittha. The Myazedi inscription has been a vital key to deciphering the Pyu language and script, and is also an important early example of the Burmese language. It is recognised in the Memory of the World Register by UNESCO.

== Stone pillars ==
The inscription is found in almost-identical copies on two stone pillars, both of which were discovered by Swiss Pali scholar Emanuel Forchhammer in 1886–1887 near the Myazedi pagoda, Myinkaba, Bagan. "Myazedi" means 'emerald stupa' (zedi being akin to the Pali cetiya and Thai chedi 'stupa').

- Pillar A stands 142 cm (56 in) tall, with a square cross-section 36 cm (14 in) wide. It is currently on display in the Bagan Archaeological Museum. On the sides are 39 lines of Old Burmese, 41 lines of Pali, 33 lines of Old Mon and 26 lines of Pyu.
- Pillar B stands 215 cm (85 in) tall, with a cross-section of 34 by 56 cm (13 by 22 in). It was found in pieces near the Gubyaukgyi Temple and in the Myazedi pagoda. The re-assembled pillar is now housed in a shelter on the grounds of the Myazedi pagoda. On the sides are 34 lines of Old Burmese, 40 lines of Pali, 46 lines of Old Mon and 29 lines of Pyu.

The Old Burmese, Pali and Old Mon inscriptions are written in the 12th-century Mon–Burmese script. The Pyu inscription is written in the Pyu script, but lacks final consonants except on lines 2 and 3 of pillar B.

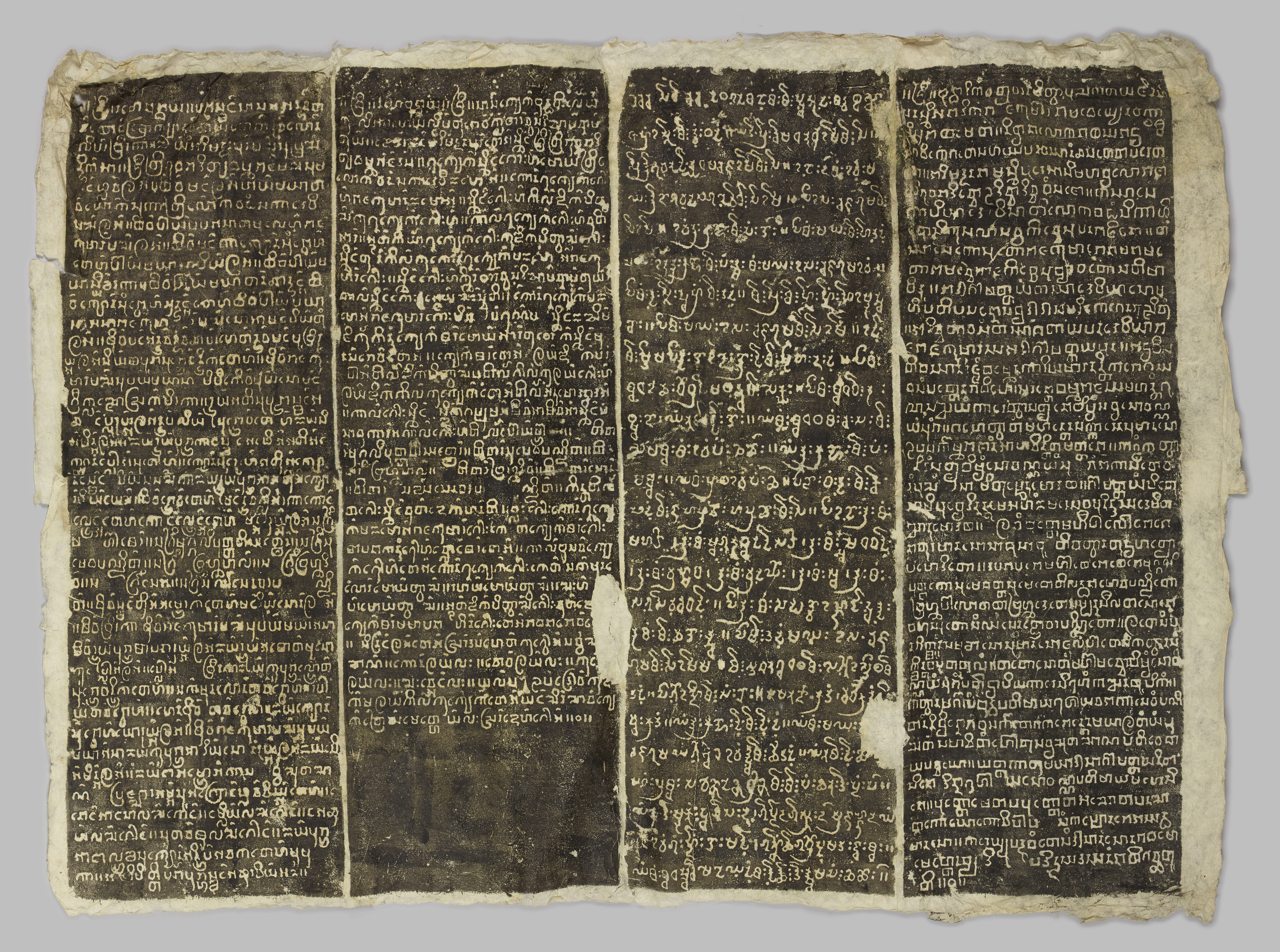
Rubbing of pillar A, with languages (from left to right): Old Burmese, Old Mon, Pyu and Pali

== Translation ==
The inscription can be generally divided into three categories, donation, wish and curse. The nearest translation is as follows:

Sīri [May everything happen successfully], Namobuddhāya [I say my prayers to Lord Buddha]. It had been over 1628 Sāsanā years. In this Arimaddamapura Empire [Bagan empire], there was a king named Śrī Tribhuvanāditya Dhammarāja [Kyansittha]. His beloved wife was Trilokavaṭansakā devi Thanbula. Her son was named Yazakumar. The king gave three servant villages to his beloved wife. After the wife died, the king gave her possessions and the three villages to her son, Yazakumar. As the king was becoming ill after reigning for 28 years, Yazakumar, acknowledging the love for the king, made a golden Buddha statue and gave to the king. Then he said: "This golden statue is dedicated to my king. As he gave the three servant villages, I, in return, give this golden statue. After the donation, the king has died. Sādu, Sādu. "In front of the monks, Mahahtae, Mogaliputtatithahtae, Tan, Tiɲgha tanavarapaṇṭai, he poured water. After that he built a place to put his golden statue. He then gave away the pagoda. He reigned over three villages, Tinmunalun (သင်မုနလွန်), Yapal (ရပါယ်) and Hanvho (ဟန်ဗိုဝ်). After pouring water over his pagoda, he said "For those deeds, may I obtain the Sabbañuta Ñan(သဗ္ဗညုတဥာဏ်). If my son, my grandson, my relative or others abuse the servants I donated for my pagoda, they shall not be able to see Maitreya Buddha.

== Analysis ==
Typical Bagan handwriting was either rectangular or circular in shape, but in this inscription, the handwriting resembles Tamarind seeds. Being the beginning of Myanmar Literature, some words were not written systematically, that is, the consonants and vowels were separated (e.g.,"သာသနာအနှစ် တစ်ထောင်ခြောက်ရာ" was written as "သာသနာ အနှစ်တ" on a line, and "စ်ထောင်ခြောက်ရာ" was written on the next line).

There were only words for the first person. "I" and "my". Instead of "he", Yazakumar referred to himself as "The son of the beloved wife" (ထိုပယ်မယားသား) and "it" was "this" (ဤ/ထို). Some words had archaic meanings (e.g.,ပယ်, which has modern meaning of "abandon", meant "Lovely, or beloved" and နှပ်, meaning "relax" or "mix thoroughly", meant "donate").

Yazakumar referred to his father as Śrī Tribhuvanāditya Dhammarāja, meaning "The king who can enlighten all three worlds like the sun", his mother as Trilokavaṭansakā devi (The queen who could lead all three worlds) and the Pagan Empire as Arimaddanāpura Empire (Meaning: The place where they can successfully outnumber enemies), respectively.

The purpose of the donation category is to let people appreciate their deeds. The wishing category is part of the tradition of Buddhism. The main intention of writing curse to preserve the donations and to prevent donated structures from being damaged.

From this inscription, the reign periods of Kyansittha, Anawrahta, Saw Lu, and Alaungsithu can be calculated, old Pyu Language can be learnt, and Yazakumar's respect and love for his father can be observed.

== Gallery ==
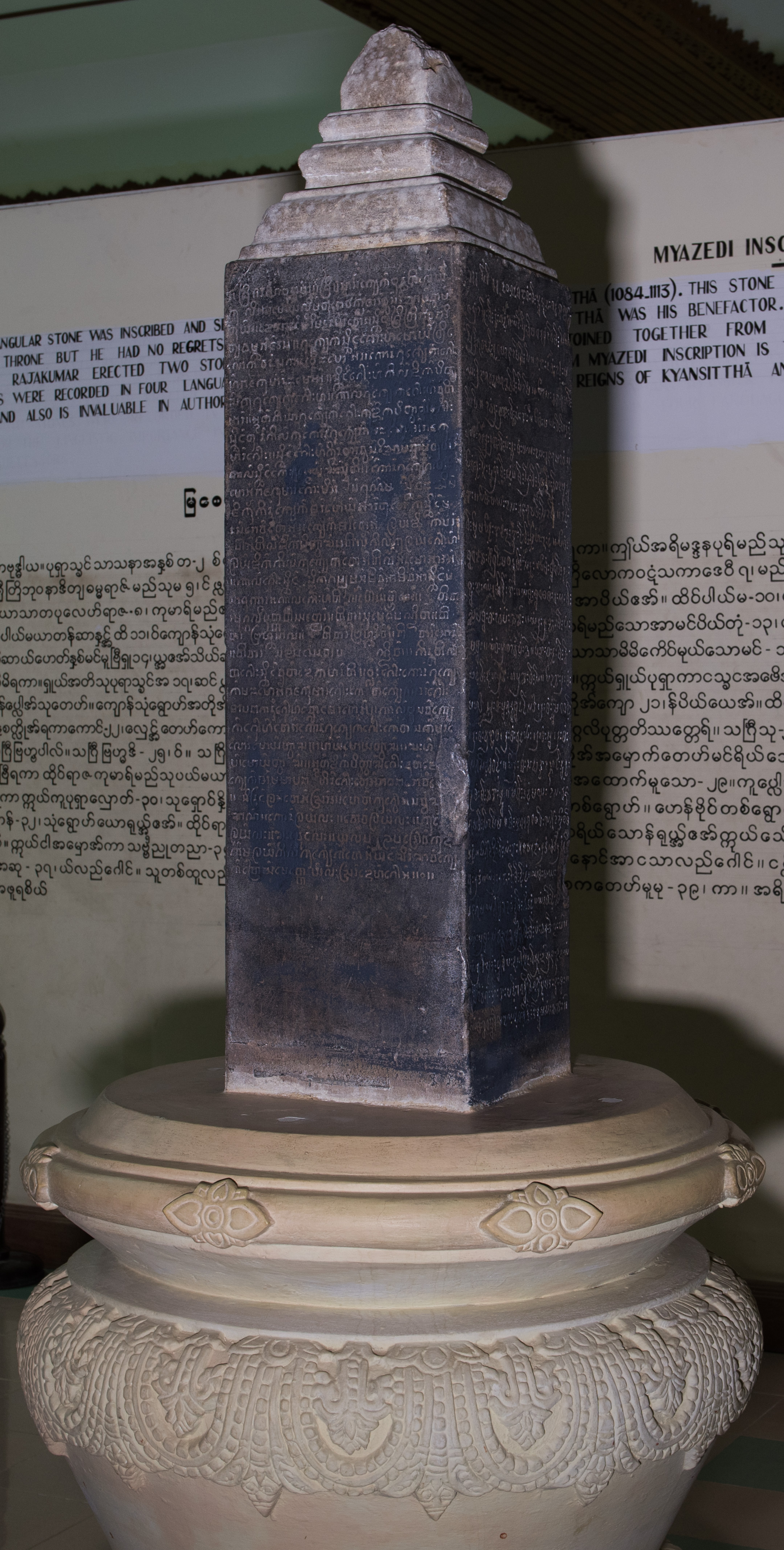
Pillar A

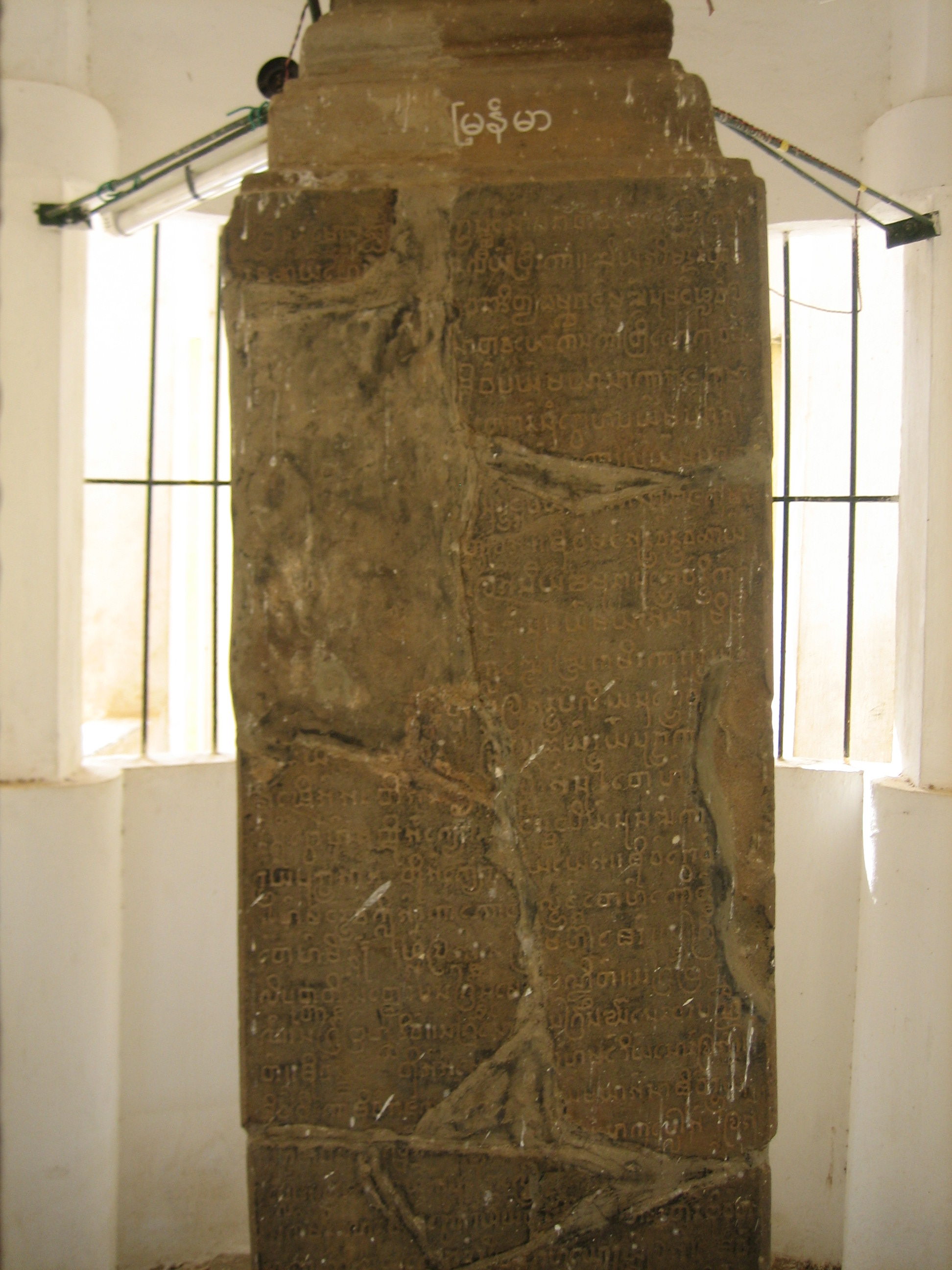
Old Burmese face of pillar B

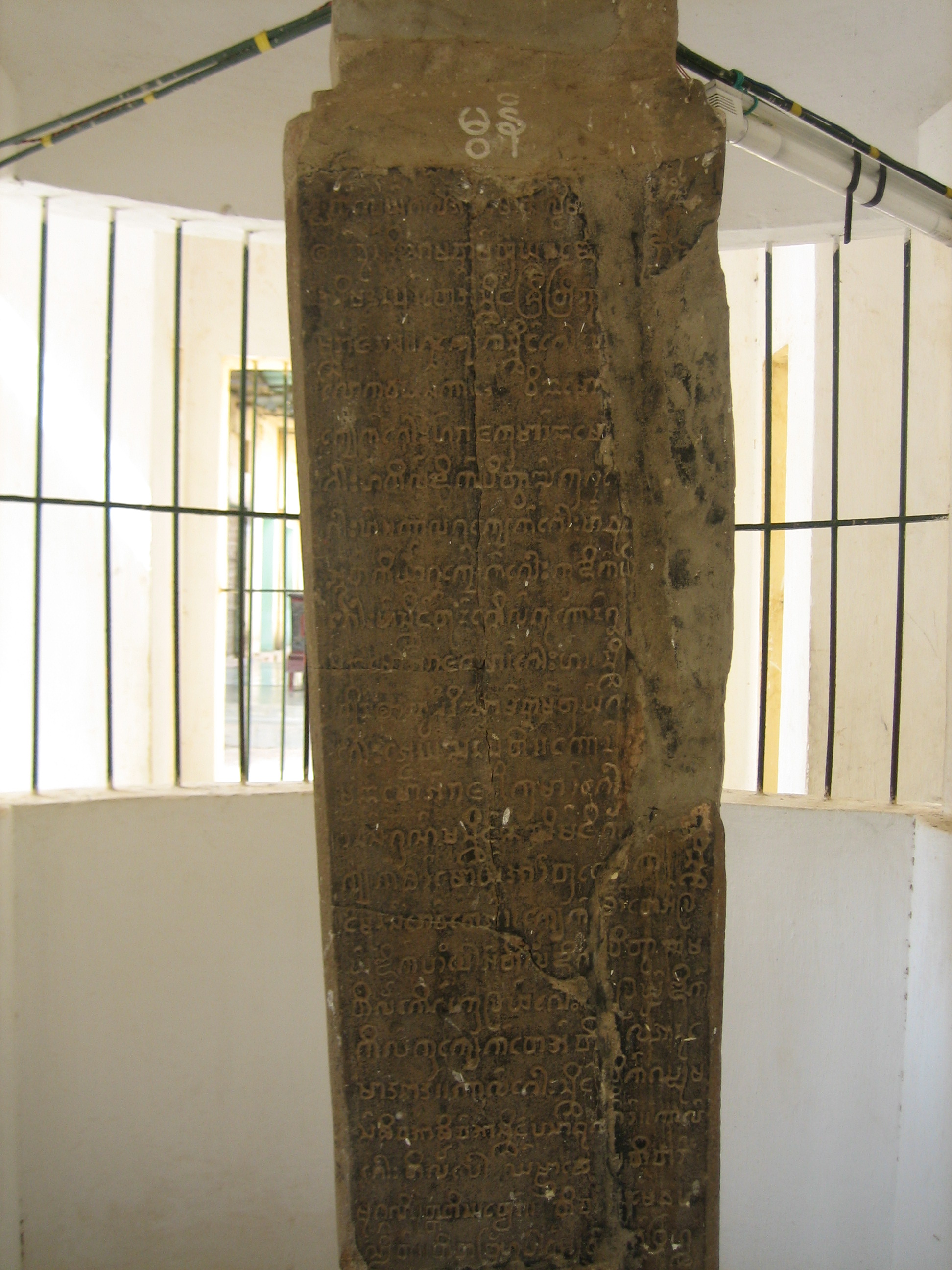
Old Mon face of pillar B

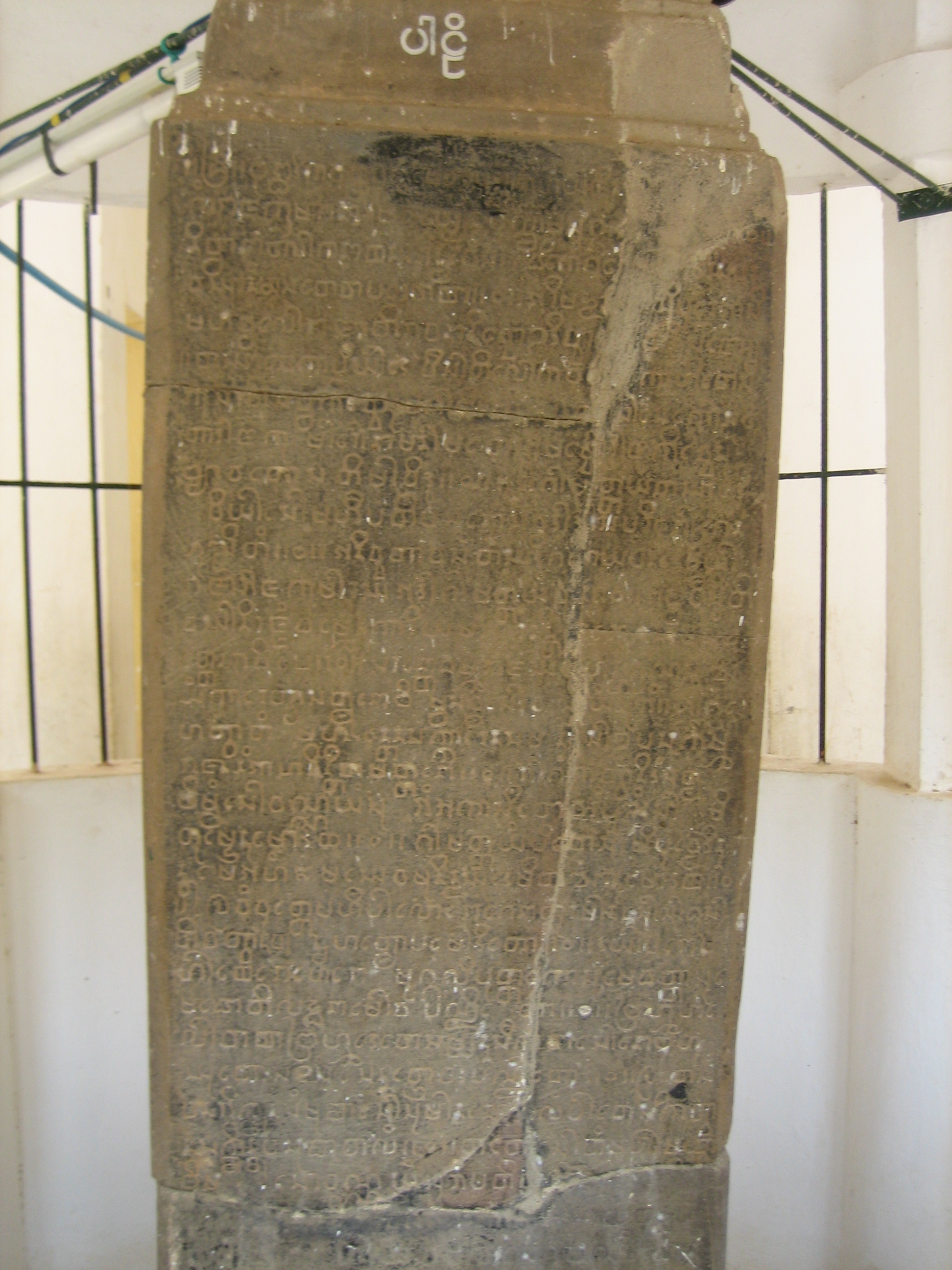
Pali face of pillar B

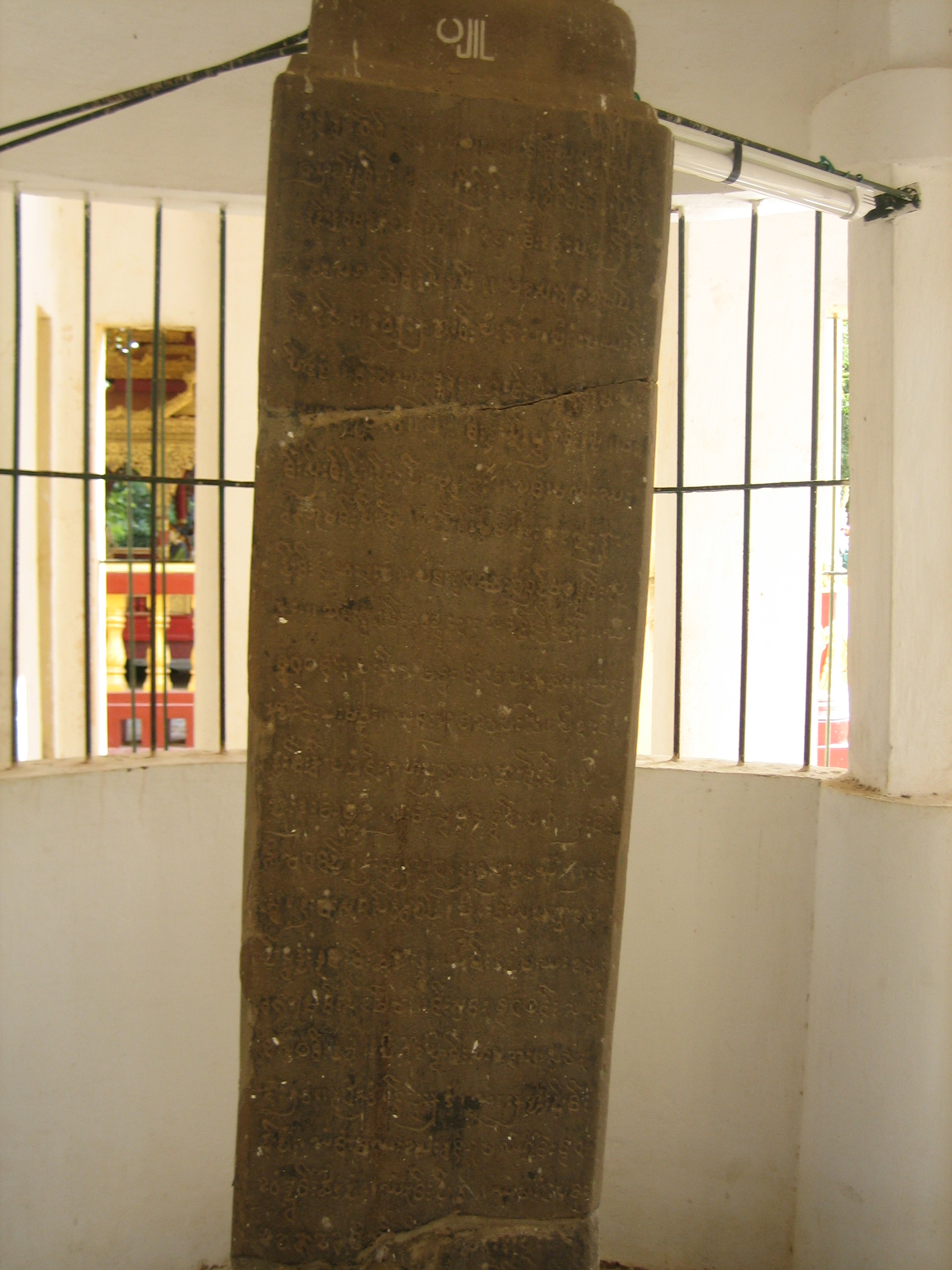
Pyu face of pillar B
