= Pyu script =

Historic Brahmic script used in Burma

Pyu
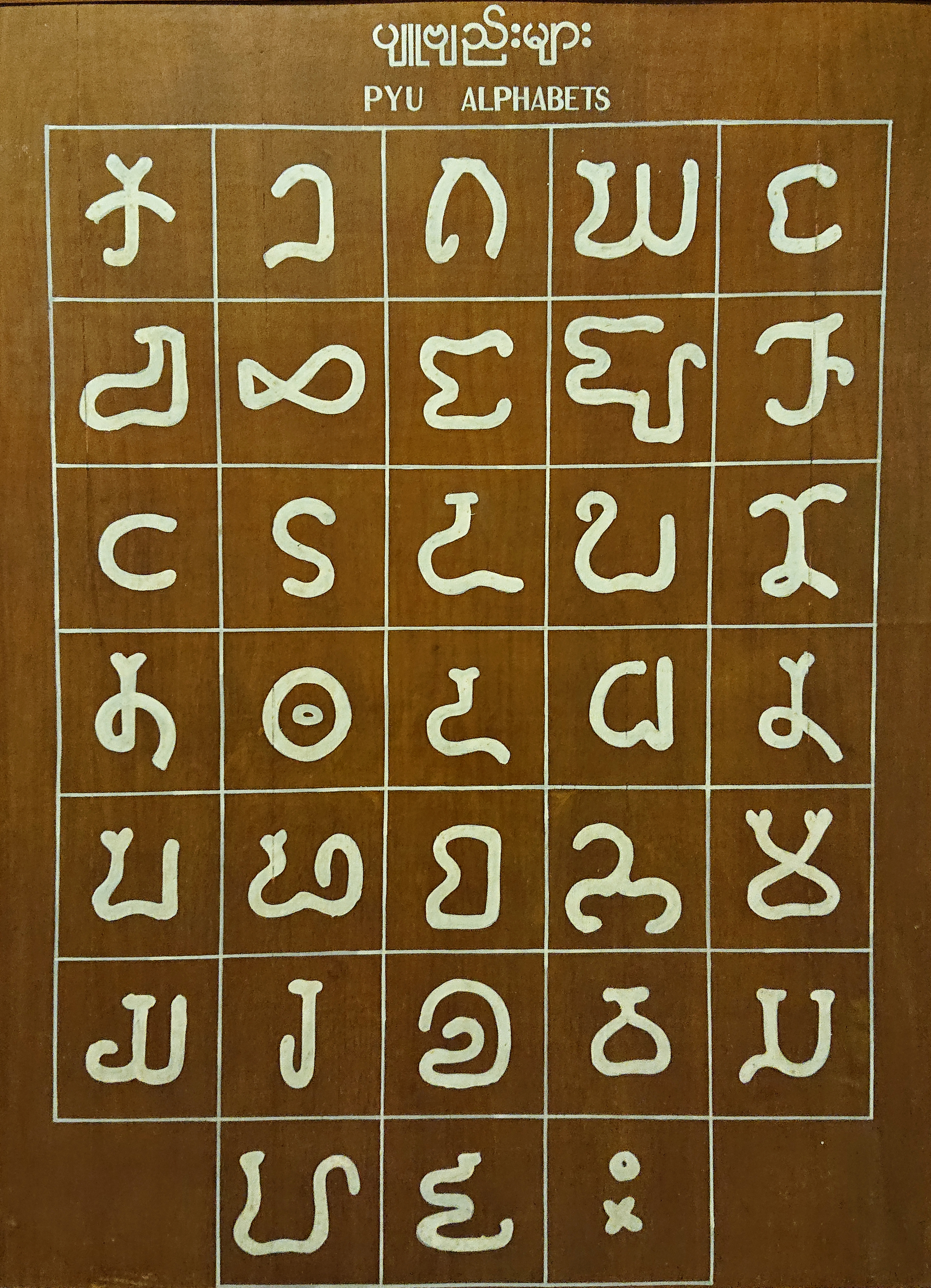
- Script type: Abugida
- Period: 350 CE - 1200 CE
- Direction: Left-to-right
- Languages: Pyu language

Related scripts
- Parent systems: Proto-Sinaitic script: Phoenician alphabet; Aramaic alphabet; Brāhmī; Kadamba; Pyu

Unicode
- Unicode range: Not in Unicode

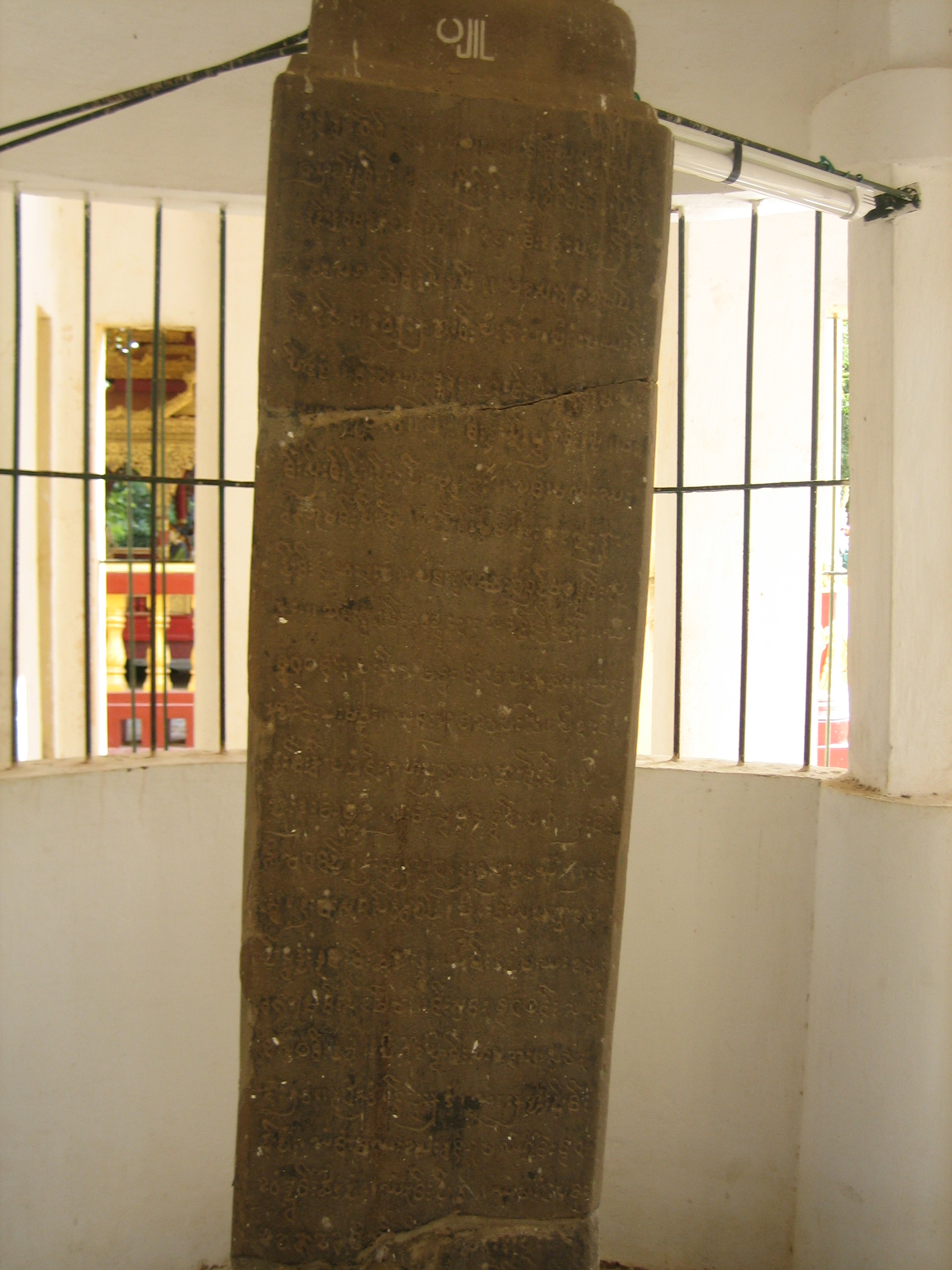
The Myazedi inscription c. 1112–1113 in Pyu

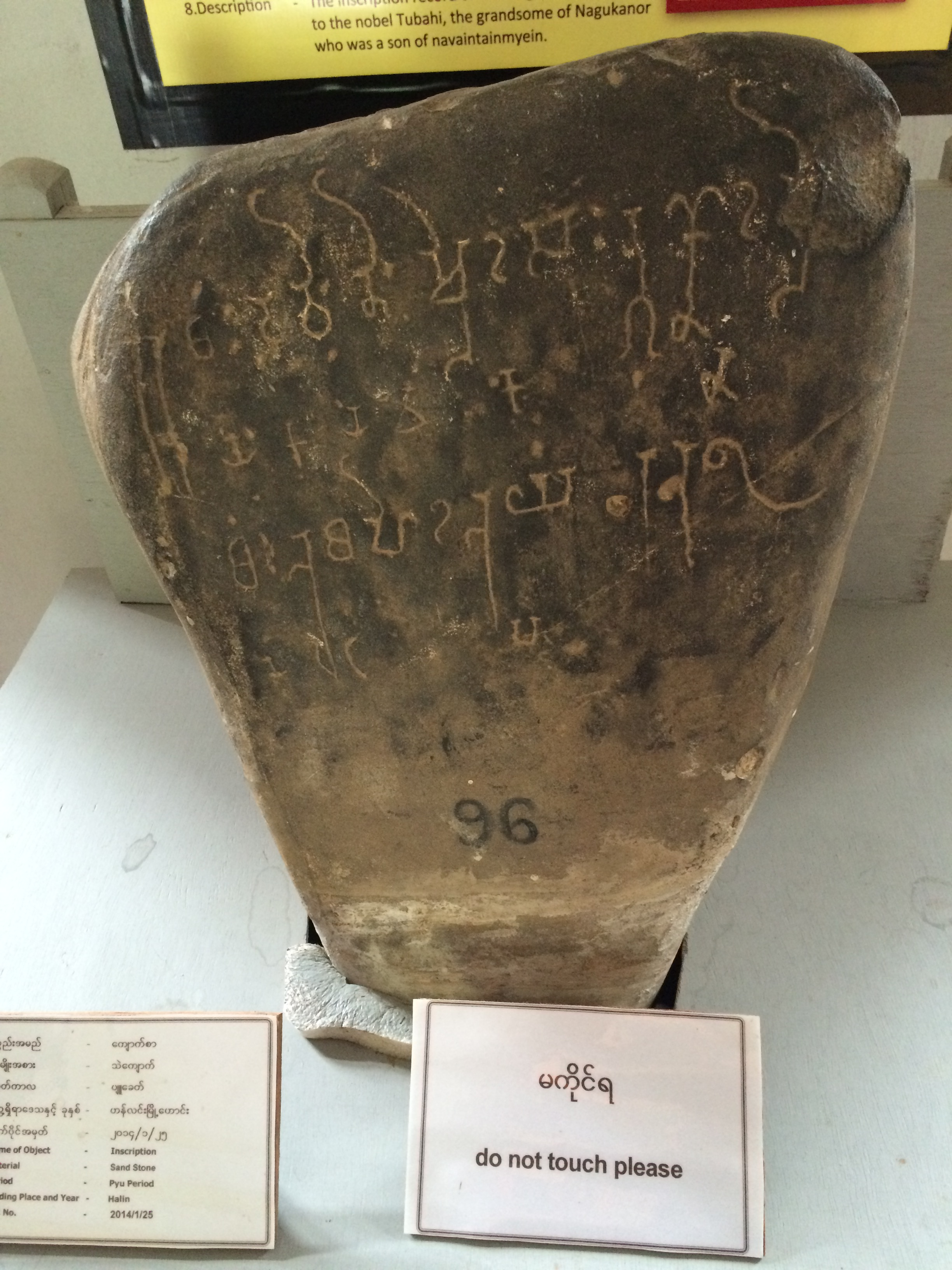
A Pyu inscription from Hanlin Archeological Museum, Burma

The Pyu script is a writing system used to write the Pyu language, an extinct Sino-Tibetan language that was mainly spoken in present-day central Burma. It was based on the Brahmi-based scripts of both north and south India. The best available evidence suggests that the Pyu script gradually developed between the 2nd and 6th centuries CE. The Pyu script's immediate precursor appears to be the Kadamba script of southwest India. The early period Pyu inscriptions always included interlinear Brahmi scripts. It was not until the 7th and 8th centuries that Sri Ksetra's inscriptions appeared all in the Pyu script, without any interlinear Brahmi.

Many of the important inscriptions were written in Sanskrit and Pali, alongside the Pyu script. The Pyu sites have yielded a wide variety of Indian scripts ranging from Ashokan Brahmi script and Tamil Brahmi script, both dated to the 3rd and 2nd centuries BCE, to the Gupta script and Kadamba script dated to the 4th to 6th centuries CE.

The Pyu script is presently not in Unicode. Its inclusion was proposed in 2010, and has tentative placement in the Unicode Consortium's roadmap.
