= Pyu language (Sino-Tibetan) =

Language of ancient Myanmar

Pyu
- Tircul
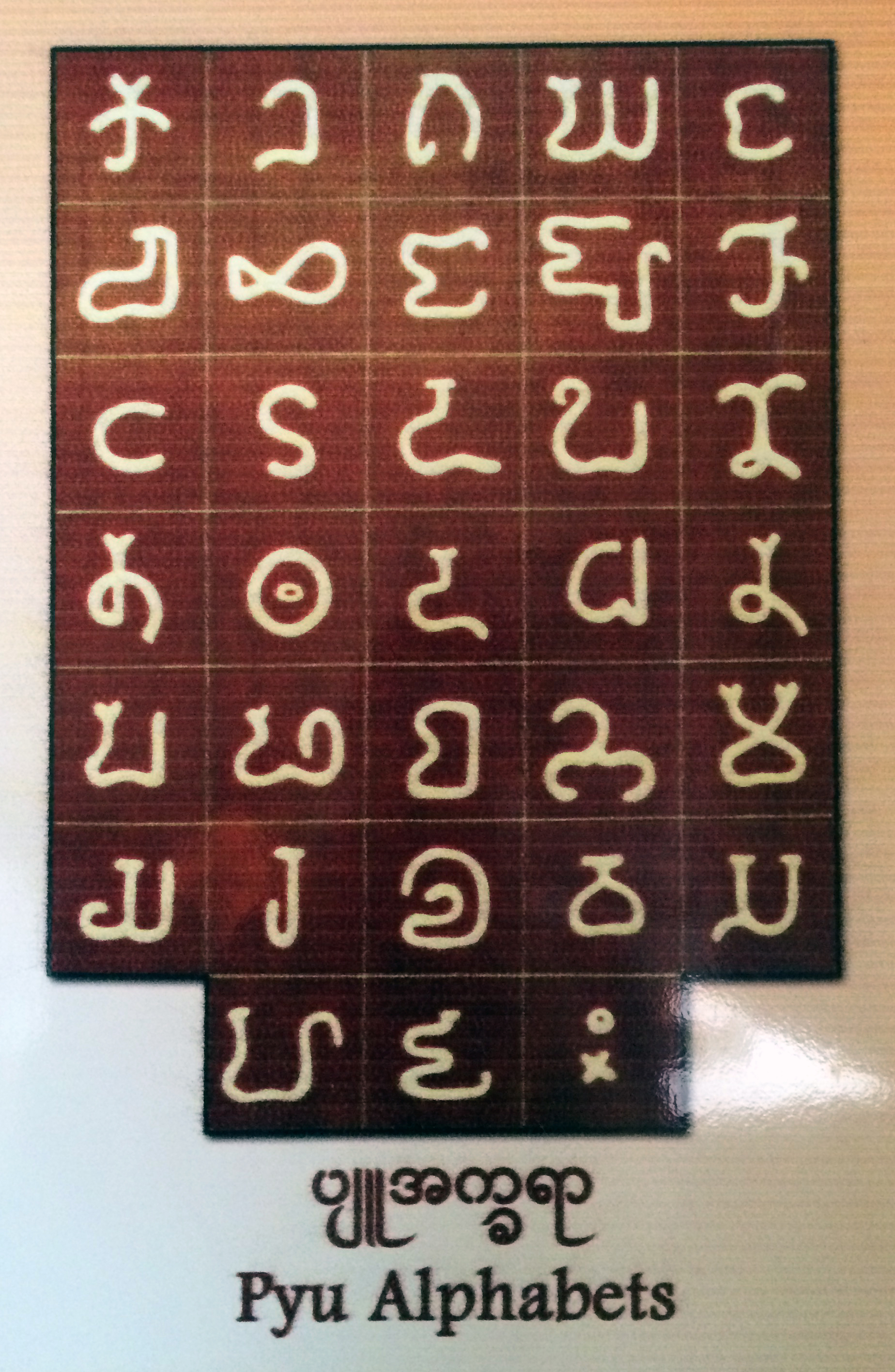
- Pyu alphabet
- Region: Pyu city-states, Pagan Kingdom
- Extinct: 13th century
- Language family: Sino-Tibetan: Pyu
- Writing system: Pyu script

Language codes
- ISO 639-3: pyx
- Glottolog: burm1262

The Pyu language (Pyu:; Burmese: ပျူ ဘာသာ, IPA: [pjù bàðà]; also Tircul) is an extinct Sino-Tibetan language that was mainly spoken in what is now Myanmar in the first millennium CE. It was the vernacular of the Pyu city-states, which thrived between the second century BCE and the ninth century CE. Its usage declined starting in the late ninth century when the Bamar people of Nanzhao began to overtake the Pyu city-states. The language was still in use, at least in royal inscriptions of the Pagan Kingdom if not in popular vernacular, until the late twelfth century. It became extinct in the thirteenth century, completing the rise of the Burmese language, the language of the Pagan Kingdom, in Upper Burma, the former Pyu realm.

== History ==
=== Documentation ===
The language is principally known from inscriptions on four stone urns (7th and 8th centuries) found near the Payagyi pagoda (in the modern Bago Township) and the multi-lingual Myazedi inscription (early 12th century). These were first deciphered by Charles Otto Blagden in the early 1910s.

==== List of Pyu inscriptions ====
Location	Inventory number
Halin	01
Śrī Kṣetra	04
Pagan	07
Pagan	08
Śrī Kṣetra	10
Pagan	11
Śrī Kṣetra	12
Śrī Kṣetra	22
Śrī Kṣetra	25
Śrī Kṣetra	28
Śrī Kṣetra	29
Myittha	32
Myittha	39
Śrī Kṣetra	42
Śrī Kṣetra	55
Śrī Kṣetra	56
Śrī Kṣetra	57
Halin	60
Halin	61
???	63
Śrī Kṣetra	105
Śrī Kṣetra	160
???	163
Śrī Kṣetra	164
Śrī Kṣetra	167

=== Usage ===
The language was the vernacular of the Pyu states. However, Sanskrit and Pali appear to have co-existed alongside Pyu as the court language. The Chinese records state that the 35 musicians who accompanied the Pyu embassy to the Tang court in 800–802 played music and sang in the Fàn (梵 "Sanskrit") language.

== Classification ==
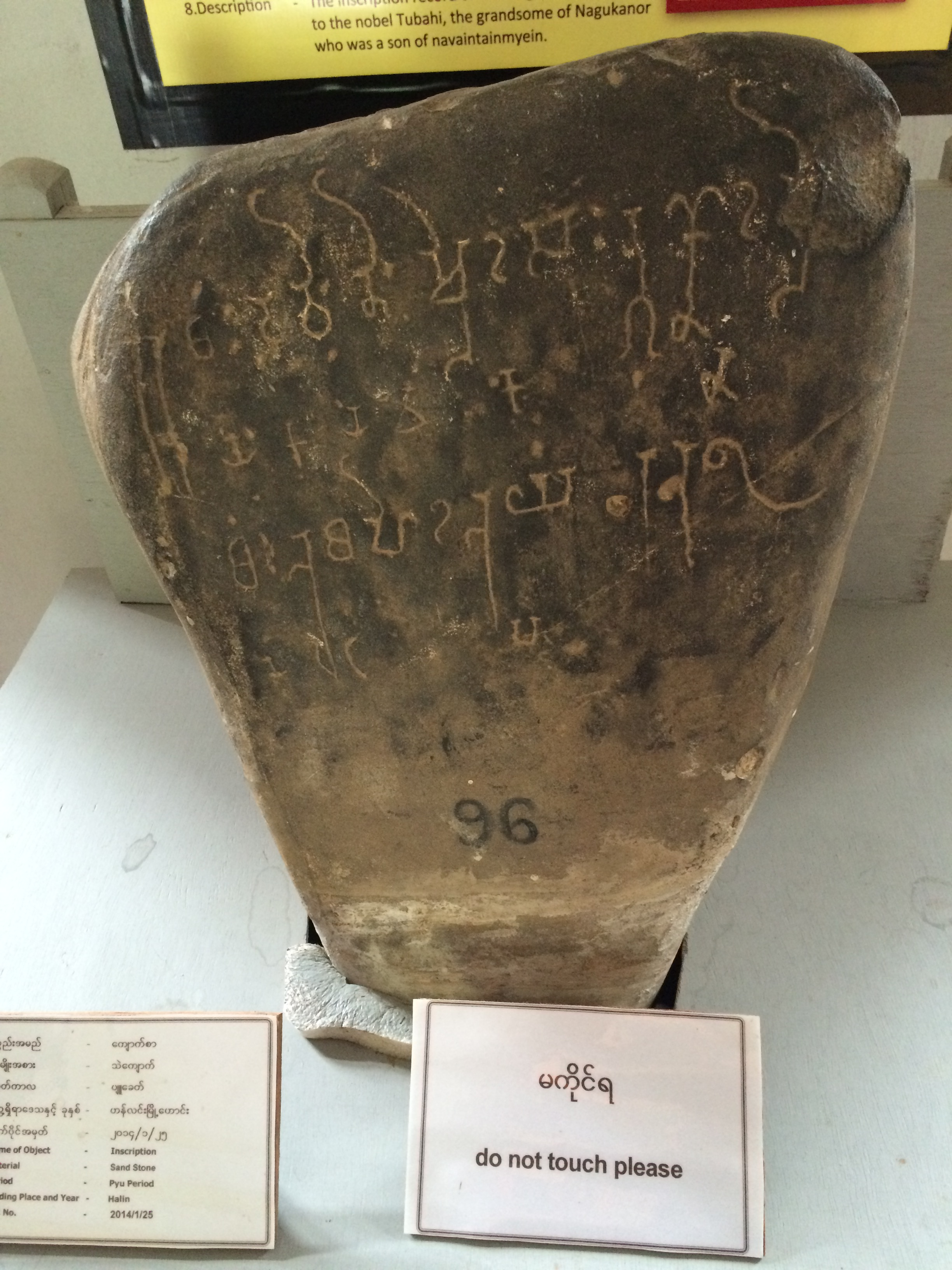
Pyu Inscription from Hanlin

Pyu city-states in the Irrawaddy valley, c. 8th century

Blagden (1911: 382) was the first scholar to recognize Pyu as an independent branch of Sino-Tibetan. Miyake (2021, 2022) argues that Pyu forms a branch of its own within the Sino-Tibetan language phylum due to its divergent phonological and lexical characteristics. Pyu is not a particularly conservative Sino-Tibetan language, as it displays many phonological and lexical innovations and has lost much of the original Proto-Sino-Tibetan morphology. Miyake (2022) suggests that this may be due to a possible creoloid origin of Pyu.

Pyu was tentatively classified within the Lolo-Burmese languages by Matisoff and thought to most likely be Luish by Bradley, although Miyake later showed that neither of these hypotheses are plausible. Van Driem also tentatively classified Pyu as an independent branch of Sino-Tibetan.

=== Sound changes ===
Pyu displays the following sound changes from Proto-Tibeto-Burman.

- sibilant chain shift: *c > *s > /h/
- denasalization: *m > /ɓ/ and possibly *ŋ > /g/
- *e-lowering: *e > /ä/
- *sC-cluster compression: *sk, *st, *sp > /kʰ, tʰ, pʰ/

== Phonology ==
Marc Miyake reconstructs the syllable structure of Pyu as:

(C.)CV(C)(H)
(preinitial) + syllable

7 vowels are reconstructed.

	front	mid	back
high	i		u
mid	e	ə	o
low	æ		a

Miyake reconstructs 43-44 onsets, depending on whether or not the initial glottal stop is included. Innovative onsets are:

- fricatives: /h ɣ ç ʝ ð v/
- liquids: /R̥ R L̥ L/
- implosive: /ɓ/

10 codas are reconstructed, which are -k, -t, -p, -m, -n, -ŋ, -j, -r, -l, -w. Pyu is apparently isolating, with no inflection morphology observed.

== Writing system ==
The Pyu script was a Brahmic script. Recent scholarship suggests the Pyu script may have been the source of the Burmese script.

== Vocabulary ==
Below are selected Pyu basic vocabulary items from Gordon Luce and Marc Miyake.

Gloss	Luce (1985)	Miyake (2016)	Miyake (2021)
one	tå	ta(k·)ṁ	/tæk/
two	hni°	kni	
three	ho:, hau:	hoḥ	/n.homH/ < *n.sumH < *məsumH
four	pḷå	plaṁ	
five	pi°ŋa	(piṁ/miṁ) ṅa	/pəŋa/
six	tru	tru(k·?)	
seven	kni	hni(t·?)ṁ	
eight	hrå	hra(t·)ṁ	
nine	tko	tko	/t.ko/
ten	sū, sau	su	
twenty	tpū		
bone, relic	ru		
water	tdu̱-		/t.du/
gold	tha		
day	phru̱		
month	de [ḷe ?]		
year	sni:		
village	o		
good; well	ha		
to be in pain, ill	hni°:		
nearness	mtu		
name	mi		/r.miŋ/
I	ga°:		
my	gi		
wife	maya:		
consort, wife	[u] vo̱:		
child, son	sa:		/saH/
grandchild	pli, pli°		
give			/pæH/

== Sample texts ==
Myazedi inscription	Myazedi inscription translation
	Prosperity! One thousand six hundred and twenty-eight years after Lord Buddha had attained Nibbana, this city was named Arimaddanapur. The King was named Sri Tribhuvanditya Dhammaraja. The King's queen consort was called Trilokavatamsakadevi. Her son was named Rajakumer. The King gave her three villages of slaves. When the Queen had died the King gave the Queen's goods and the three villages of slaves, to the noble Queen's son Rajakumar. After the noble King had enjoyed royal splendour for twenty-eight years, he was sick nigh unto death. That noble Queen's son was called Rajakumar. The Queen's son being mindful of the King's beneficence in bringing him up, caused a golden statue to be made in the likeness of the Lord Buddha and, giving the golden Buddha, to the King, said thus: "On behalf on my lord (father) I consecrate this golden Buddha. I now give the three villages of slaves to my lord. May my lord give them to the noble golden Buddha. "There upon the King smiled and said, "Well done! Well done!" Then, in the presence of the noble disciples Maha-thera, Moggliputatissa-thera, Sumedha the Leamed, Brahma-pala, Brahmadiv, Sona, Sanghadena the very Learned, the noble King poured water (onto the ground in dedication). Thereafter, Rajakumar the Queen's son, had the golden Buddha enshrined in a cave for which a golden spire was made. In consecrating the cave-pagoda, the villages from the three villages namely Sakmunalun, one village; Rabai, one village, were assembled and assigned to the pagoda. The Queen's son Rajakumar, in pouring the (libation) water said thus: "May this my deed, help me to attain Ommiscience and wisdom (like a Buddha). If any harm be done to any of these slaves, or to anything that I now dedicate to this pagoda, or if any violence done against them be not deterred, be it, my own son, be it my grandson, be it my own kinsman be it any stranger, let him never see the noble Arimettaya Buddha."

Pyu Pali	Burmese Pali	Translation
(Pyu alphabet AD 500 to 600 Writings)	ဣတိပိ သော ဘဂဝါ အရဟံ သမ္မာသမ္ဗုဒ္ဓော ဝိဇ္ဇာစရဏသမ္ပန္နော	Thus, indeed is that Gracious One: The Worthy One, fully enlightened, endowed with clear vision and virtuous conduct,
	သုဂတော လောကဝိဒူ အနုတ္တရော ပုရိသဒမ္မ သာရထိ သတ္ထာ ဒေဝမနုသာနံ ဗုဒ္ဓေါ ဘဂဝါ(တိ)	sublime, the Knower of the worlds, the unsurpassed guide of those who need taming, the Teacher of gods and men, the Buddha and the Gracious One.
