= Family tree of Burmese monarchs =

== Pagan (849–1297) ==
Saw Khin; Hnit of Pagan
Sale Ngahkwe ≈875–934 r. ≈904–934	Pyinbya; 817–876 r. 846–876
Theinhko ≈919–956 r. ≈934–956	Tannet; 859–904 r. ≈876–904	?
Kunhsaw; Kyaunghpyu ≈955–1048 r. ≈1001–1021	Myauk; Pyinthe; Chief queen	Ale Pyinthe	Saw Rahan II ≈924–1001 r. ≈956–1001	Taung; Pyinthe; Chief queen
Agga Mahethi; Chief queen	Anawrahta; 1014–1077 r. 1044–1077	Pyinsa; Kalayani	Sokkate ≈1001–1044 r. ≈1038–1044	Kyiso ≈1000–1038 r. ≈1021–1038
Usaukpan; Chief queen	Saw Lu; 1049–1084 r. 1077–1084	Manisanda; Chief queen	Kyansittha; 1030–1112/13 r. 1084–1112/13	Apeyadana; Chief queen	Thanbula; Chief queen
Saw Yun ≈1070–?	Shwe Einthi	Yazakumar; 1078–?
Yadanabon I Chief queen	Sithu I 1090–1167 r. 1112/13–1167	Ti Lawka; Sanda Dewi; Chief queen
Myauk; Pyinthe	Narathu; 1118–1171 r. 1167–1171	Taung; Pyinthe; Chief queen	Min Shin; Saw; 1117?–1167
Weluwaddy; Chief queen	Naratheinkha; 1141–1174 r. 1171–1174	Min Aung Myat; Chief queen	Sithu II; 1138–1211 r. 1174-1211	Saw; Mya Kan	Taung; Pyinthe II; Chief queen
Eindawthe ≈1170s–1198	Htilominlo; 1175–1235 r. 1211–1235	Pwadawgyi of Pagan; Chief queen
Yaza Dewi of Pagan; Chief queen	Kyaswa; 1198–1251 r. 1235–1251	Saw Min; Waing ≈1193–aft.1273	Naratheinga; Uzana; 1190s–1235	Shin Saw of Pagan
Saw Khin; Htut	Thonlula; Chief queen	Uzana; 1213–1256 r. 1251–1256	Su Le Htone	Pwa Saw; Chief queen
Thihathu; 1230s–1256	Yadanabon II of Pagan; Chief queen	Sithu IV; 1238–1287 r. 1256–1287
Theinkha Bo	Saw Htut of Pinya; Chief queen	Sithu; 1280s–1344	Uzana of Bassein ?–1287	Yazathu ≈1260–1291
Atula Dewi; 1266–?	Thihathu of Prome ?–1288	Yadanabon	Thihathu; 1265–1325 r. 1313–1325	Mi Saw U Chief queen	Kyawswa; 1260–1299 r. 1289–1297	Pwa Saw of Thitmahti; Chief queen
Theingapati; 1270s–1299	Kumara; Kassapa ≈1280–? r.1301
Shin; Myat Hla of Prome	Min Shin Saw; Gov. of Thayet; 1280s–1350s? r. ≈1300–1334	Tarabya I King of Sagaing; 1297–1339 r. 1327–1335/36	Saw Hnaung of Sagaing	Saw Yun; King of Sagaing; 1299–1327 r. 1315–1327	Kyawswa I King of Pinya; 1299–1350 r. 1344–1350	Mway Medaw of Pinya; 1297–?	Uzana I King of Pinya; 1298–1356/57; 1325–1340	Saw Min Ya	Saw Hnit; Viceroy of Pagan; 1283–1325; 1297–1325
Kings of Ava	Kings of Sagaing	Kings of Pinya

== Small kingdoms ==
=== Myinsaing (1297–1313) and Pinya (1313–1364) ===
Uzana; King of Pagan; 1213–1256 r. 1251–1256
Theinkha Bo	? Thihathu; 1230s–1256	Sithu IV; King of Pagan; 1238–1287 r. 1256–1287
Yazathingyan of Myinsaing; 1263–1312/13 r. 1297–1312/13	Athinkhaya of Myinsaing; 1261–1310 r. 1297–1310	Saw U Chief queen	Yadanabon	Thihathu; King of Pinya; 1265–1325 r. 1313–1325	Mi Saw U	Kyawswa; King of Pagan; 1260–1299 r. 1289–1297	Sithu; 1280s–1344	Saw Htut of Pinya; Chief queen
Tarabya I King of Sagaing; 1297–1339 r. 1327–1335/36	Thihapate I Gov. of Taungdwin	Saw Pale of Pinya	Saw Yun; King of Sagaing; 1299–1327 r. 1315–1327	Saw Hnaung of Sagaing	Saw Hnit; V. of Pagan; 1283–1325; 1297–1325	Uzana I King of Pinya; 1298–1356/57; 1325–1340	Saw Min Ya
Kings of Sagaing	Nawrahta; Gov. of Kanni r. 1349–1364?	Kyawswa I King of Pinya; 1299–1350 r. 1344–1350	Atula; Sanda Dewi of Pinya; Chief queen	Saw Pa Oh of Sagaing	Sithu	Thihapate; Gov. of Yamethin r. 1330s–1351
Shwe; Einthe of Paukmyaing	Kyawswa II; King of Pinya; 1328–1359 r. 1350–1359	Narathu; King of Pinya; 1333–1364 r. 1359–1364	Uzana II; King of Pinya; 1324/25–1364 r. 1364

=== Sagaing (1315–1364) ===
Yadanabon	Thihathu; King of Pinya; 1265–1325 r. 1313–1325	Kyawswa; King of Pagan; 1260–1299 r. 1289–1297
Tarabya I King of Sagaing; 1297–1339 r. 1327–1335/36	Saw Hnaung of Sagaing; Chief queen	Saw Yun; King of Sagaing; 1299–1327 r. 1315–1327	Min Shin Saw; Gov. of Thayet; 1280s–1350s? r.≈1300–1334
Anawrahta I King of Sagaing; 1313–1339 r. 1335/36–1339	Kyaswa; King of Sagaing; 1323–1349 r. 1339–1349	Saw Pa Oh of Sagaing	Thihapate; King of Sagaing; 1305–1364 r. 1352–1364	Soe Min; Kodawgyi	Thado; Hsinhtein; Vic. of Tagaung ≈1320–1351	Tarabya II; King of Sagaing; 1327–1352 r. 1349–1352	Anawrahta II; King of Sagaing; 1326–1349 r. 1349
Saw Sala of Sagaing	Uzana II; King of Pinya; 1324/25–1364 r. 1364	Swa Saw Ke; King of Ava; 1330–1400 r. 1367–1400	Saw Taw Oo of Sagaing	Thado; Minbya; King of Ava ≈1345–1367 r. 1365–1367
Kings of Ava

=== Ava (1364–1555) and Prome (1482–1542) ===
- Kings of Ava; - Kings of Prome

Thihathu; King of Pinya; 1265–1325 r. 1313–1325	Mi Saw U Chief queen	Kyawswa; King of Pagan; 1260–1299 r. 1289–1297	Saw Soe of Pagan
Saw Yun; K. of Sagaing; 1299–1327 r. 1315–1327
Saw Hnit; V. of Pagan; 1283–1325; 1297–1325	Soe Min; Chief queen	Min Shin Saw; Gov. of Thayet; 1280s–1350s? r. ≈1300–1334	Shin; Myat Hla of Prome
Kyawswa I King of Pinya; 1299–1350 r. 1344–1350	Atula; Sanda Dewi of Pinya; Chief queen	Thado; Minbya; King of Ava ≈1345–1367 r. 1365–1367	Saw Taw; Oo of Sagaing	Shin Saw; Gyi ≈1347– aft.1401 Chief queen	Swa Saw; Ke; King of Ava; 1330–1400 r. 1367–1400	Saw Beza	Khame Mi ≈1330s- 1390s Chief queen
Shwe; Einthe of Paukmyaing	Min; Hla Myat	Tarabya; 1368–1400 r. 1400	Shin Saw	Mingaung I 1373–1421 r. 1400–1421	Shin; Mi-Nauk; 1374–?	Razadarit; King of Hanthawaddy; 1368–1421 r. 1384–1421	Thupaba; Dewi	Theiddat; 1375/76 –1408
Saw Diga of Mye-Ne	Min Nyo of Kale; 1385–1426 r. 1425–1426	Minye; Kyawswa ≈1391–1415	Min; Hla Htut; Duchess of Prome; 1388/89–?	Shin Sawbu; Queen of Hanthawaddy; 1394–1471 r. 1454–1471	Saw Pyei; Chantha; Chief queen
Mohnyin; Thado; 1379–1439 r. 1426–1439	Shin Myat; Hla of Ava	Saw; Min Hla; Chief queen	Thihathu; 1394–1425 r. 1421–1425	Shin Bo-Me; Chief queen
Minye; Kyawswa I 1410–1442 r. 1439–1442	Min Hla; Nyet	Shin Hla Myat of Pakhan	Narapati I 1413–1468 r. 1442–1468	Atula; Thiri Maha; Yaza Dewi	Min Hla; 1417–1425 r. 1425
Min Mya Hnit of Twinthin	Shwe; Einthi of Twinthin	Ameitta; Thiri Maha; Dhamma; Dewi	Thihathura; 1431–1480 r. 1468–1480	Mingyi Swa; Viceroy of Prome r. 1446–1482	Saw Myat Lay	Myat Hpone Pyo of Tharrawaddy	Thado; Minsaw; King of Prome; 1440s–1526 r. 1482–1526	Saw Myat Lay of Prome
Minkhaung II; 1446–1501 r. 1480–1501	Atula; Thiri; Dhamma; Dewi	Thado; Dhamma; Yaza of Salin	Minye; Kyawswa of Yamethin	Thado; Dhamma; Yaza of Salin	Shwe; Zin Gon	Bayin Htwe ?–1533 r. 1526–1532	Chit Mi of Prome
Thihathura II; 1474–1501 r. 1485–1501	Narapati II; 1476–1527 r. 1501–1527	Dhamma; Dewi	Narapati ?–1539 r. 1532–1539	Narapati IV; 1495–1570s? r. 1551–1555	Salin; Mibaya; 1533–?	Yaza II; V. of Prome; 1520s–1588 r. 1551–1588
Nawrahta of Yamethin	Mingyi Nyo	Mingyi Htwe	Sanda Dewi; 1517/18–1580s? Chief queen	Minkhaung ?–1553; 1539–1542	Mingyi Swe; Viceroy of Toungoo; ~1490s–1549 r.1540–1549	Laygyun; Mibaya; Chief queen	Tabinshwehti; King of Toungoo; 1516–1550 r. 1530–1550
Sawlon of Mohnyin; 1486–1533 r. 1500s–1533	Hkonmaing; 1497–1545 r. 1542–1545	Bayinnaung; King of Toungoo; 1516–1581 r. 1550–1581	Minkhaung II; Viceroy of Toungoo; 1520s–1584
Thohanbwa; 1505–1542 r. 1527–1542	Narapati III; 1516–? r. 1545–1551	Kings of Toungoo

=== Hanthawaddy (1287–1539, 1550–1552) ===
□
May Hnin; Thwe-Da; ~1250s-?	Wareru; 1253–1307 r. 1287–1307	Hkun Law; 1254–1311 r. 1307–1311	Hnin U Yaing ≈1260s–1310s	Min Bala d. 1310s
Binnya; E Law; 1308–1348 r. 1330–1348	Sanda Min; Hla ?–≈1363; Chief queen	Saw Zein; 1303–1330 r. 1323–1330	May Hnin; Htapi; Chief queen	Saw O 1283–1323 r. 1311–1323
Maha Dewi ≈1322–1392 r. 1383–1384; Regent	Mi; Ma-Hsan	Byattaba of Martaban	Min Linka ≈1327–≈1353; Gov. of Pegu (r. 1348–≈1353)	Saw E 1303–1330 r. 1330
Mwei It; Chief queen	Mwei Kaw; Chief queen	Binnya U 1323–1384 r. 1348–1384	Mwei Zeik	Mwei Daw ≈1330s–1368
Tala Mi Daw ≈1368–1390	Razadarit; 1368–1421 r. 1384–1421	Mwei Thin	Piya Yaza; Dewi; 1360s–1392 Chief queen	Mwei; Ohn-Naung; Chief queen
Bawlawkyantaw; 1383–1390	Binnya; Dhammaraza ≈1392–1424 r. 1421–1424	Binnya Kyan; Gov. of Martaban
Binnya Kyan; 1420–1453 r. 1451–1453	Soe Min; Wimala; Dewi	Binnya; Ran I 1393–1446 r. 1424–1446	Thihathu; King of Ava; 1394–1425 r. 1421–1425	Shin; Sawbu; 1394–1471 r. 1454–1471	Binnya Bye
Leik Munhtaw; 1432–1454 r. 1453–1454	Yaza; Dewi II; Chief queen	Dhammazedi; 1409–1492 r. 1471–1492	Wihara; Dewi; Chief queen	Mi; Pakahtaw	Binnya Waru r. 1418–1451 r. 1446–1451
Binnya; Ran II; 1469–1526 r. 1492–1526
Takayutpi; 1511–1539 r. 1526–1539	Smim Htaw ?–1553 r. 1550–1552

=== Mrauk-U (1429–1785) ===
Saw Nyet; Htwa	Razathu II; King of Launggyet d.1401 r. 1394–1395/ 1397–1401
Saw Sit II; Chief queen	Min Saw Mon; 1380–1433 r. 1429–1433	Min Khayi; 1392–1459 r. 1433–1459	Saw Pa-Ba; Chief queen
Min Kyaw	Min Mandat	Min Mon Thin	Saw San-Me	Min Swe of Launggyet
Saw; Htwe Me; Chief queen	Ba Saw Nyo; 1435–1494 r. 1492–1494	Saw Nandi chief queen	Ba Saw Phyu; 1430–1482 r. 1459–1482	Saw Htin
□
Taung-Nan; Mibara	Min Saw O 1456–1515 r. 1515	Salingathu; 1455–1502 r. 1494–1502	Saw Shin; Saw	Saw; Pan-Phya	Min Dawlya; 1456–1492 r. 1482–1492	Saw Ru; Saw	Gamani	Narapati; Sekkya
Saw Nandi	Min Raza; 1480–1514 r. 1502–1513	Saw Manaw	Min Ran Aung; 1485–1494 r. 1494	Thazata; 1464–1521 r. 1515–1521	Saw; Nan-Hset	Minkhaung; 1477–1531 r. 1521–1531
Saw Thuza	Gazapati; 1497–1515 r. 1513–1515	Saw Min Hla	Min Bin; 1493–1554 r. 1531–1554	Saw Kauk Ma	Saw Shin
□	Saw Kauk Ma	Min Dikkha; 1515–1556 r. 1554–1556	Saw Mi; Latt	Saw Thanda; Chief queen	Min Phalaung; 1535–1593 r. 1572–1593
□	Dhamma; Dewi I	Min Sekkya; 1536–1572 r. 1564–1572	Min Saw Hla; 1532–1564 r. 1556–1564	Min Razagyi; 1557–1612 r. 1593–1612	Thado; Minsaw
Narapati r. 1638–1645	Min Khamaung r. 1612–1622
Thado r. 1645–1652	Thiri; Thudhamma r. 1622–1638
□	Sanda; Thudhamma ?–1684 r. 1652–1674	Min Sanay r. 1638
Sanda; Wimala I r. 1700–1707	Muni; Thudhammaraza r. 1692–1694	Oaggar Bala r. 1674–1685	Wara; Dhammaraza r. 1685–1692	Sanda; Thuriya I r. 1694–1696	□
Naradipati I r. 1698–1700	Nawrahta r. 1696	Sanda; Thuriya II r. 1707–1710

== Toungoo (1510–1752) ==
Mingyi Swe; V. of Toungoo; ~1490s–1549 r.1540–1549	Yaza Dewi; ~1500-? Queen	Mingyi Nyo; 1459–1530 r. 1510–1530	Yadana Dewi; 1490s-? Central Palace; Queen	Soe Min; Hteik-Tin; ~1460s-~1530s Chief queen
Dhamma Dewi; ~1514/15-1580s Chief queen	Tabinshwehti; 1516–1550 r. 1530–1550	Khay Ma Naw; Chief queen	Atula Thiri; ~1518–1568; Chief queen	Bayinnaung; 1516–1581 r. 1550–1581	Khin Pyezon; ~1530s-? Queen	Shin; Htwe Myat	Sanda Dewi; 1517/18–1580s? Chief queen
Hanthawaddy; Mibaya; ~1536–1606; Chief queen	Nanda; 1535–1600 r. 1581–1599	Nyaungyan; 1555–1605 r. 1599–1605	Khin Hpone; Myint; ~1560-1610s Chief queen
Atula; Sanda Dewi; Chief queen	Anaukpetlun; 1578–1628 r. 1605–1628	Khin; Myo Myat
Min Lat	Mingala Dewi	Thalun; 1584–1648 r. 1629–1648	Khin Myo Sit	Khin; Myat Hset	Minye; Deibba; 1608–1629 r. 1628–1629	Khin; Hnin Paw of Kengtung; Chief queen
Ne Myo; Ye Kyaw	Khin Ma; Min Sit	Atula Sanda; Dewi; Chief queen	Pindale; 1608–1661 r. 1648–1661	Min Phyu; Chief queen	Pye; 1619–1672 r. 1661–1672	Khin Ma Lat
Atula; Thiri; Chief queen	Minye; Kyawhtin; 1651–1698 r. 1673–1698	Sanda Dewi	Narawara; 1650–1673 r. 1672–1673
Sanay; 1673–1714 r. 1698–1714	Maha Dewi; Chief queen
Taninganway; 1689–1733 r. 1714–1733	Mingala Dewi; Chief queen
Maha Dhamma; Yaza; 1714–1754 r. 1733–1752	Nanda; Dipadi; Chief queen

== Konbaung (1752–1885) ==
1
Alaungpaya (1752–1760)	Yun San
3	6	2
Me Hla	Hsinbyushin (1763–1776)	Bodawpaya (1782–1819)	Naungdawgyi (1760–1763)	Shin Hpo U
4	5
Singu Min (1776–1781)	Thado Minsaw	Phaungka (1782)
7	8
Bagyidaw (1819–1837)	Tharrawaddy (1837–1846)
9	10
Pagan (Note: Half brother of Mindon, son of Princess Me Myat Shwe.) (1846–1853)	Mindon (Note: Half brother of Pagan.) (1853–1878)	Laungshe Mibaya
11
Thibaw (1878–1885)
