= Theingapati =

13th-century Burmese crown prince

Theingapati သိင်္ဃပတိ

Heir-apparent of Pagan
- Reign: 30 May 1289 – 17 December 1297
- Predecessor: Uzana of Bassein
- Successor: Uzana II of Pagan
- Born: c. late 1270s Dala
- Died: 10 May 1299; Sunday, 10th waxing of Nayon 661 ME; Myinsaing
- House: Pagan
- Father: Kyawswa
- Mother: Pwa Saw of Thitmahti
- Religion: Theravada Buddhism

Theingapati (Burmese: သိင်္ဃပတိ, pronounced [θèiɴga̰pədḭ]; ultimately derived from Sanskrit Siṃhapati; c. late 1270s – 10 May 1299) was heir-apparent of the Pagan Dynasty of Burma (Myanmar) from 1289 to 1297. The crown prince is known for his mission to Beijing in which he sought and received the Mongol Empire's recognition of his father, Kyawswa, as King of Pagan in March 1297. The prince was arrested after his father was overthrown in December 1297 by the three brothers of Myinsaing. The brothers branded the father-son duo as traitors and executed them in May 1299.

== Background ==
Theingapati (Singhapati) was born to Princess Saw of Thitmahti and Prince Kyawswa, Viceroy of Dala (modern Twante), during the last days of the Pagan Empire. According to contemporary inscriptions, he had one younger full-brother named Kumara Kassapa. (Note: (Ba Shin 1982: 47) includes a genealogy chart that shows Min Lulin (Saw Hnit) as a son of Kyawswa and Pwa Saw of Thitmathi. But it is most probably a mistake. A few pages earlier, (Ba Shin 1982: 42) says Saw Hnit made Pwa Saw of Thitmathi the chief queen, which means he was not Saw of Thitmathi's son. (Than Tun 1959: 120) and (Than Tun 1964: 137) suggest Saw Hnit was a half brother of his.) He grew up in the south but in 1289, two years after the fall of the Pagan Empire, he moved to the capital Pagan (Bagan). His father had been hand-picked by the dowager queen Pwa Saw to succeed his grandfather King Narathihapate, who had been assassinated two years earlier. During the two-year interregnum (1287–89), his father had successfully fended off his half-uncle Thihathu, Viceroy of Prome.

== Heir-apparent ==
Theingapati became heir-apparent of a greatly shrunken kingdom. The Pagan Empire was no more. Kyawswa was king in name only: he barely controlled outside the capital, and may have at most controlled the Minbu granary. The kingdom's most important Kyaukse granary region was controlled by the three brothers of Myinsaing who led the defense of central Irrawaddy valley against the Mongol invaders in 1283–87. The Mongols were still stationed in Tagaung in northern Burma. In the following years, Kyawswa became concerned by the brothers' increasingly open consolidation of power in the central Irrawaddy valley. In 1295 and 1296, the youngest brother, Thihathu, the most ambitious and least diplomatic, proclaimed himself hsinbyushin (ဆင်ဖြူရှင်, "Lord of the White Elephant", white elephants being the symbol of sovereigns) and mingyi (မင်းကြီး, "Great Lord"), respectively.

Kyawswa decided to seek protection from the Mongols. He reckoned that the Mongol Emperor's imprimatur would give him the necessary power to reestablish his rule at least in central Burma. In January 1297, he sent Theingapati to Tagaung. Unlike King Narathihapate in the ceasefire negotiations of 1285–86, Kyawswa did not ask the Mongol troops to withdraw from the upcountry this time; indeed, he was counting on the Mongols to stay around to give him protection. The Mongol commanders at Tagaung sent Theingapati to Beijing. On 20 March 1297, Emperor Temür Khan recognized Kyawswa and Theingapati as king and heir-apparent of Pagan, respectively. The emperor also gave Yuan titles to the three brothers of Myinsaing as subordinates of Kyawswa.

== Fall from power and death ==
Kyawswa's reign as vassal king was short. The brothers of Myinsaing ultimately decided to risk a Mongol intervention and overthrow Kyawswa. With the help of the dowager queen Pwa Saw, the brothers lured Kyawswa to attend a monastery dedication ceremony in Myinsaing. On 17 December 1297, Kyawswa was forced to become a monk at the monastery he had just dedicated. Theingapati, too, was arrested later (though it is not clear if he was arrested on the same day alongside his father in Myinsaing, or in Pagan). The usurping brothers marched to Pagan and put Saw Hnit on the throne as their puppet king.

Unfortunately for Kyawswa and Theingapati, the Mongols did not come to their rescue. The Mongols found out about the dethronement only in June/July 1298, as the brothers tried to conceal the news of the dethronement as much as possible. It turned out that the Mongol command at Yunnan did not have enough manpower to undertake an expedition, and did not take any action. When they did not see a Mongol invasion in the following dry season of 1298–99, the brothers were emboldened and became convinced that the Mongols were unlikely to intervene. They allowed Saw Hnit to hold an audience for the first time on 8 May 1299. Two days later, they executed both Kyawswa and Theingapati as traitors.

== Aftermath ==
The execution of the Mongol-appointed king and heir did not result in any immediate Mongol reprisals. The Yunnan government, which did not have enough spare troops, initially ignored the pleas of Kumara Kassapa, who had somehow escaped the arrest, to intervene. It was only after the brothers seized lightly-manned Mongol garrisons at Singu and Male in January 1300 that the Mongols took notice. They organized a small expedition to central Burma in the following dry season, but it failed.

== Bibliography ==
- Ba Shin, Bo-Hmu (1966). "The Pwa Saws of Bagan" (PDF). Burma Historical Research Department Silver Jublice Publication (in Burmese) (1982 ed.). Yangon: Historical Research Department. Archived from the original (PDF) on 2016-03-04.
- Coedès, George (1968). Walter F. Vella (ed.). The Indianized States of Southeast Asia. trans.Susan Brown Cowing. University of Hawaii Press. ISBN 978-0-8248-0368-1.
- Htin Aung, Maung (1967). A History of Burma. New York and London: Cambridge University Press.
- Royal Historical Commission of Burma (2003) [1832]. Hmannan Yazawin (in Burmese). Vol. 1–3. Yangon: Ministry of Information, Myanmar.
- Than Tun (December 1959). "History of Burma: A.D. 1300–1400". Journal of Burma Research Society. XLII (II).
- Than Tun (1964). Studies in Burmese History (in Burmese). Vol. 1. Yangon: Maha Dagon.
- Wade, Geoff (2009). Eugene Perry Link (ed.). The Scholar's Mind: Essays in Honor of Frederick W. Mote. Chinese University Press. ISBN 9789629964030.

Theingapati Pagan Dynasty Born: c. 1270s Died: 10 May 1299
Royal titles
| Preceded by Uzana of Bassein | Heir-apparent of Pagan; 1289–1297 | Succeeded by Uzana II of Pagan |
