= Kumara Kassapa =

Kumara Kassapa ကုမာရ ကဿပ

King of Pagan
- Reign: c. 25 January 1301 – 6 April 1301
- Predecessor: Saw Hnit
- Successor: Saw Hnit
- Born: c. 1280; Dala (Twante)
- Died: Yunnan?
- House: Pagan
- Father: Kyawswa
- Mother: Pwa Saw of Thitmahti
- Religion: Theravada Buddhism

Kumara Kassapa or Kumara Kathapa (Burmese: ကုမာရ ကဿပ, pronounced [kṵməɹa̰ kaʔθəpa̰]) was the Yuan dynasty-installed King of Pagan, who reigned for ten weeks in 1301. The second son of King Kyawswa of Pagan sought Mongol intervention after his father was overthrown by the Myinsaing brothers in 1297. Declared the rightful king of Burma by Emperor Temür Khan in 1300, Kumara Kassapa returned to Pagan (Bagan) with a Mongol invasion force in 1301, only to retreat after the Mongol general staff accepted a bribe.

== Background ==
Kumara Kassapa was born to Princess Saw of Thitmahti and Prince Kyawswa, Viceroy of Dala (modern Twante), during the last days of the Pagan Empire. According to contemporary inscriptions, he had one full elder brother Theingapati. (Note: (Ba Shin 1982: 47) includes a genealogy chart that shows Min Lulin (Saw Hnit) as a son of Kyawswa and Pwa Saw of Thitmathi. But it is most probably a mistake. A few pages earlier, (Ba Shin 1982: 42) says Saw Hnit made Pwa Saw of Thitmathi the chief queen, which means he was not Saw of Thitmathi's son. (Than Tun 1959: 120) and (Than Tun 1964: 137) suggest Saw Hnit was a half brother of his.) He grew up in the south but in 1289, two years after the fall of the Pagan Empire, he moved to the capital Pagan (Bagan). His father had been handpicked by the dowager queen Pwa Saw to succeed his grandfather King Narathihapate, who was assassinated two years earlier.

At Pagan, his father presided over a greatly shrunken kingdom; his control barely extended outside the capital. In the following years, his authority was increasingly challenged by the three brothers of Myinsaing who led the defense of the Irrawaddy valley against the Mongol invaders in 1283–87. Kyawswa sought Mongol vassalage with the hope of getting their protection, and officially became a Mongol vassal on 20 March 1297. Kyawswa was subsequently removed from power nine months later by the Myinsaing brothers. About a year and a half later, on 10 May 1299, the Myinsaing brothers executed Kyawswa and Theingapati.

== Mongol vassal king ==
Kumara Kassapa somehow escaped the execution. He managed to travel to Yunnan, reaching there in September 1299. The Mongol provincial government, which did not have enough spare troops, initially ignored his pleas to intervene. They changed their mind only after the Myinsaing brothers seized two southernmost Mongol garrisons in northern Burma in January 1300. They finally sent him to Beijing where on 22 June 1300 the prince was declared the rightful king of Burma by Emperor Temür Khan. The vassal king accompanied a 12,000-strong invasion force in the following dry season. He entered Pagan without difficulty as the main invasion army reached nearby Myinsaing on 25 January 1301. (His half-brother Saw Hnit, the Myinsaing-installed King of Pagan, had evacuated the city, and was in Myinsaing.)

Kumara Kassapa's reign was short-lived. A month into the siege, the Mongols launched a major assault on Myinsaing on 28 February 1301. But Myinsaing defenses held, and by 12 March 1301, ceasefire negotiations began. The two sides came to an agreement that called for a Mongol withdrawal in exchange for a bribe of 800 taels (30 kg) of gold and 2200 taels (83 kg) of silver. Kumara Kassapa returned with the Mongol withdrawal that lasted from 6–8 April 1301.

It was the last known event involving the prince. The Mongols did not have much use with him afterwards as they pursued a policy of retrenchment from the peripheral regions. As such, they sent no more expeditions although they were unhappy with the withdrawal. (Note: (Harvey 1925: 78): The Yunnan government executed the top two commanders of the invasion army for the failure.) The Mongols completely evacuated northern Burma two years later on 4 April 1303. He certainly was not well regarded by the Myinsaing brothers. A stone inscription, inscribed a year after the war in 1302, calls him Taruk Pyi La Thaw Tet-Taw-Mu Mingyi ("The King who Came from the Land of the Taruk [China]").

== Bibliography ==
- Ba Shin, Bo-Hmu (1982) [1966]. "The Pwa Saws of Bagan" (PDF). Burma Historical Research Department Silver Jublice Publication (in Burmese). Yangon: Historical Research Department. Archived from the original (PDF) on 2016-03-04.
- Harvey, G. E. (1925). History of Burma: From the Earliest Times to 10 March 1824. London: Frank Cass & Co. Ltd.
- Htin Aung, Maung (1967). A History of Burma. New York and London: Cambridge University Press.
- Royal Historical Commission of Burma (2003) [1832]. Hmannan Yazawin (in Burmese). Vol. 1–3. Yangon: Ministry of Information, Myanmar.
- Than Tun (December 1959). "History of Burma: A.D. 1300–1400". Journal of Burma Research Society. XLII (II).
- Than Tun (1964). Studies in Burmese History (in Burmese). Vol. 1. Yangon: Maha Dagon.
- Wade, Geoff (2009). Eugene Perry Link (ed.). The Scholar's Mind: Essays in Honor of Frederick W. Mote. Chinese University Press. ISBN 9789629964030.

Kumara Kassapa Pagan Dynasty Born: c. 1280
Royal titles
Preceded by Saw Hnit	King of Pagan; 25 January 1301 – 6 April 1301	Succeeded by Saw Hnit
