= Pwa Saw (disambiguation) =

Pwa Saw, also known as Saw Hla Wun, (c. 1240 – c. 1295/96 or 1310s) was a chief queen consort of King Narathihapate of the Pagan Dynasty of Burma.

Pwa Saw, a Burmese royal epithet for queens dowager, may also refer to:

- Saw Min Waing (c. 1193 – c. 1273), a consort of Prince Naratheinga Uzana of Pagan
- Pwa Saw of Thitmahti (c. 1250s – c. 1334), chief queen consort of King Kyawswa, and of King Saw Hnit of the Pagan Dynasty of Burma
- Mi Saw U (r. 1313–1325), consort of Kyawswa of Pagan and Thihathu of Pinya.

== See also ==
- Shin Saw of Pagan (r. c. 1231–35)
