= Saw Min Waing =

Saw Min Waing စောမင်းဝိုင်း

Queen of the Northern Palace
- Tenure: 1231 – 1235
- Predecessor: Myauk Pyinthe (Htilominlo)
- Successor: Pwa Saw
- Born: c. 1193; Pagan (Bagan)
- Died: after 9 February 1273; Pagan
- Spouse: Naratheinga Uzana
- Issue: Uzana of Pagan
- House: Pagan
- Religion: Theravada Buddhism

Saw Min Waing (Burmese: စောမင်းဝိုင်း, pronounced [sɔ́ mɪ́ɴ wáiɴ]; also known as Pwa Saw) was one of the two consorts of Prince Naratheinga Uzana of Pagan. Naratheinga is regarded by some historians such as G.H. Luce and Than Tun as a king that ruled Pagan although none of the Burmese chronicles mentions him as king. Some historians such as Htin Aung and Michael Aung-Thwin do not recognize Naratheinga as king.

According to inscriptional evidence, she was probably already married to Naratheinga by 1212, and was probably about 18 to 20 years old. Although she was not the first wife (or chief queen) of Naratheinga, she seemed to have been more powerful as her son Uzana became king ahead of the two sons by the chief queen. Her two elder brothers were senior officials at the court. Her second elder brother Manu Yaza (also known as Maha Thaman) rose to be a chief minister of kings Kyaswa and Uzana.

The queen lived to an old age; she was still alive on 9 February 1273 (Note: Thursday, 8th waning of Tabaung 634 ME translates to Thursday, 9 February 1273 if the year 634 is treated as a regular (non-leap) year. The calendar used by Myanmar's Universities Historical Research Center treats the year as a great leap year, and gives Sunday, 12 March 1273.) per an inscription dedicated by her at the Min Waing monastery. She was likely dead by October 1277, according to another inscription.

She was the first of the three famous queens with the nickname Pwa Saw (lit. "Queen Grandmother"). The other two were: Saw Hla Wun, the chief queen of kings Uzana and Narathihapate, and Saw Thitmahti, queen of King Kyawswa.

== Bibliography ==
- Aung-Thwin, Michael A.; Maitrii Aung-Thwin (2012). A History of Myanmar Since Ancient Times (illustrated ed.). Honolulu: University of Hawai'i Press. ISBN 978-1-86189-901-9.
- Ba Shin, Bo-Hmu (Col.) (1982) [1966]. "The Pwa Saws of Bagan" (PDF). Burma Historical Research Department Silver Jubilee Publication (in Burmese). Yangon: Historical Research Department. Archived from the original (PDF) on 2016-03-04.
- Htin Aung, Maung (1970). Burmese History before 1287: A Defence of the Chronicles. Oxford: The Asoka Society.
- Kala, U (2006) [1724]. Maha Yazawin (in Burmese). Vol. 1–3 (4th printing ed.). Yangon: Ya-Pyei Publishing.
- Taw, Sein Ko; Emanuel Forchhammer (1899). Inscriptions of Pagan, Pinya and Ava: Translation, with Notes. Rangoon: Archaeological Survey of India.
- Than Tun (1964). Studies in Burmese History (in Burmese). Vol. 1. Yangon: Maha Dagon.

Saw Min Waing Pagan Kingdom Born: c. 1193 Died: 1270s
Royal titles
Preceded by Myauk Pyinthe (Htilominlo)	Queen of the Northern Palace; 1231–1235	Succeeded by Pwa Saw
