= Shin Saw of Pagan =

Shin Saw ရှင်စော

Chief queen consort of Burma
- Tenure: 1231? – 1235
- Predecessor: Pwadawgyi
- Successor: Yaza Dewi
- Born: 1190s Pagan (Bagan)
- Died: after 24 April 1241; Pagan
- Spouse: Naratheinga Uzana
- Issue: Theingapati; Tarabya
- House: Pagan
- Religion: Theravada Buddhism

Shin Saw (Burmese: ရှင်စော, pronounced [ʃɪ̀ɴ sɔ́]; also known as Asaw (အစော, [ʔəsɔ́])) was the chief wife of Prince Naratheinga Uzana of Pagan. Naratheinga is regarded by some historians such as G.H. Luce and Than Tun as a king that ruled Pagan although none of the Burmese chronicles mentions him as king. Some historians such as Htin Aung and Michael Aung-Thwin do not recognize Naratheinga as king.

Her husband apparently had died on 19 July 1235 when her brother-in-law Kyaswa became king. She was still alive on 24 April 1241, according to a surviving stone inscription at a temple she donated. (Note: See the inscription at (Taw, Forchhammer 1899: 71). Taw and Forchhammer incorrectly identify her as Queen Pwa Saw, queen of Uzana and Narathihapate. They are wrong because: (1) the inscription clearly identifies her as the mother of Theingapati and Tarabya (Tarmun); and (2) Pwa Saw was born c. 1240. Per (Maha Yazawin Vol. 1 2006: 234, footnote #1), Naratheinga Uzana did have another wife, who later became known as Pwa Saw; she was the second wife Saw Min Waing.)

== Bibliography ==
- Aung-Thwin, Michael A.; Maitrii Aung-Thwin (2012). A History of Myanmar Since Ancient Times (illustrated ed.). Honolulu: University of Hawai'i Press. ISBN 978-1-86189-901-9.
- Htin Aung, Maung (1970). Burmese History before 1287: A Defence of the Chronicles. Oxford: The Asoka Society.
- Kala, U (1724). Maha Yazawin (in Burmese). Vol. 1–3 (2006, 4th printing ed.). Yangon: Ya-Pyei Publishing.
- Than Tun (1964). Studies in Burmese History (in Burmese). Vol. 1. Yangon: Maha Dagon.

Shin Saw of Pagan Pagan Kingdom Born: 1190s Died: after 24 April 1241
Royal titles
Preceded by Pwadawgyi	Chief queen consort of Burma; 1231?–1235	Succeeded by Yaza Dewi
