= Pwa Saw =

Saw Hla Wun စောလှဝန်း

Chief queen consort of Burma
- Tenure: 1262–1287
- Predecessor: Yadanabon
- Successor: Pwa Saw of Thitmahti (as Chief Queen of Pagan)

Queen of the Northern Palace
- Tenure: 1256–1262
- Predecessor: Saw Min Waing
- Successor: Saw Soe
- Born: c. 1240–44; Hseit-htein Kanbyu; Pagan Empire
- Died: in or after 1313 (or 1295–96); Pagan (Bagan); Pinya Kingdom
- Spouse: Uzana (c. 1253–56); Narathihapate (1256–87)
- Issue: Yazathu
- House: Pagan
- Father: Thray
- Mother: Min Mi
- Religion: Theravada Buddhism

Pwa Saw (Burmese: ဖွားစော [pʰwá sɔ́]; also known as Saw Hla Wun (စောလှဝန်း, [sɔ́ l̥a̰ wʊ́ɴ]); c. 1240–c. 1295/96 or 1310s) was a chief queen consort of King Narathihapate of the Pagan Dynasty of Burma (Myanmar). She is remembered as witty, wise, and beautiful, and as someone who exercised political influence for four decades during one of the most difficult periods in the country's history. Historians are divided as to whether the chronicle narratives contain more myth than fact.

Hla Wun was the most well known of the three historical Pagan period queens known by the epithet Pwa Saw (lit. 'Queen Grandmother', or 'queen dowager'). The queen was the benevolent power behind the throne, shielding the public and the court from the erratic pronouncements of Narathihapate, whom chronicles describe as arrogant, gluttonous, quick-tempered, paranoid and ruthless. By using her wit, she skillfully stayed out of the king's paranoid suspicions. Although she was not always successful, the queen often managed to talk the king into changing his numerous rash decisions and making wise state decisions.

Hla Wun continued to wield influence even after Narathihapate's death in 1287. As the leader of the court, the dowager queen put Kyawswa on the throne in 1289. But she was disappointed by Kyawswa's inability to restore the fallen Pagan Empire. Chronicles say that she organized a coup against Kyawswa in 1297, and remained an éminence grise well into the 1310s. She is said to have given her blessing to King Thihathu's claim as the rightful successor of the Pagan kings in 1313. However, one analysis of the contemporary inscriptions, though not universally accepted, finds that she may have died as early as 1295/96, and that the Pwa Saw who lived in the early 14th century was Saw Thitmahti.

== Background ==
Much of her life known in Burmese popular culture is from the Burmese chronicles from the 18th and 19th centuries. Inscriptional evidence tells a far different story. Modern historians are divided on whether the chronicle narratives contain more myth than fact.

According to the chronicles, Saw Hla Wun was born to a wealthy farming family in a small village named Hseit-htein Kanbyu (ဆိတ်ထိန်းကမ်းဖြူ) (Note: Spelling per (Hmannan Vol 1 2003: 335, 338). Maha Yazawin (Maha Yazawin Vol. 1 2006: 236) spells it as ဆိတ်တိန်းကမ်းဖြူ, Hseit-tein Kanbyu.) in the Mount Popa region c. 1240–44. (Note: She was 11 when she became a junior wife of Uzana in the month of Nadaw (~November/December) in an unspecified year. Since Uzana reigned from c. May 1251 to May 1256, she was born sometime between 1240 and 1244. Furthermore, (Lockard 2009: 43) says she was born c. 1237. He seems to have simply subtracted her chronicle reported age of 12 from the Hmannan Yazawin chronicle reported accession date of Uzana, 1249. This has three issues: (1) the age of 12 in the Burmese chronicles is equal to 11 in Western age reckoning; (2) Zatadawbon Yazawin, considered to be the most accurate chronicle for the Pagan period, says Uzana came to power in 1251; and (3) chronicles do not say that Uzana met her in the first year of his reign as Lockard has assumed.) Apparently, a precocious child, Hla Wun became well known in the region for her intellect and supposed clairvoyance at a young age. One November, King Uzana, who was en route to Mount Popa to pay respects to the Mahagiri spirit there, heard the news about her, and had her brought before him. The king is said to have been greatly impressed by her intelligence, and made her a junior queen of his. (Note: (Pe, Luce 1960: 157): "less than a queen, more than a concubine".)

However, a contemporary inscription dedicated by the queen herself states that she was a granddaughter of King Kyaswa and Queen Saw Mon Hla. She was the second child of seven; she had an elder sister Yadanabon, three younger brothers and two younger sisters. Her mother was an elder sister of Queen Thonlula, the chief queen of Uzana. It means that Hla Wun was a niece of Thonlula, as well as a first cousin, once removed of Uzana.

== Reign ==
=== Uzana years ===
Her initial years at Pagan (Bagan) were uneventful. She remained a junior queen of Uzana who spent much of his time hunting elephants around the country. She soon became a widow in May 1256 when the king suddenly died from a hunting accident near Dala (modern Yangon). The young queen had no children with the late king.

=== Chief queen ===
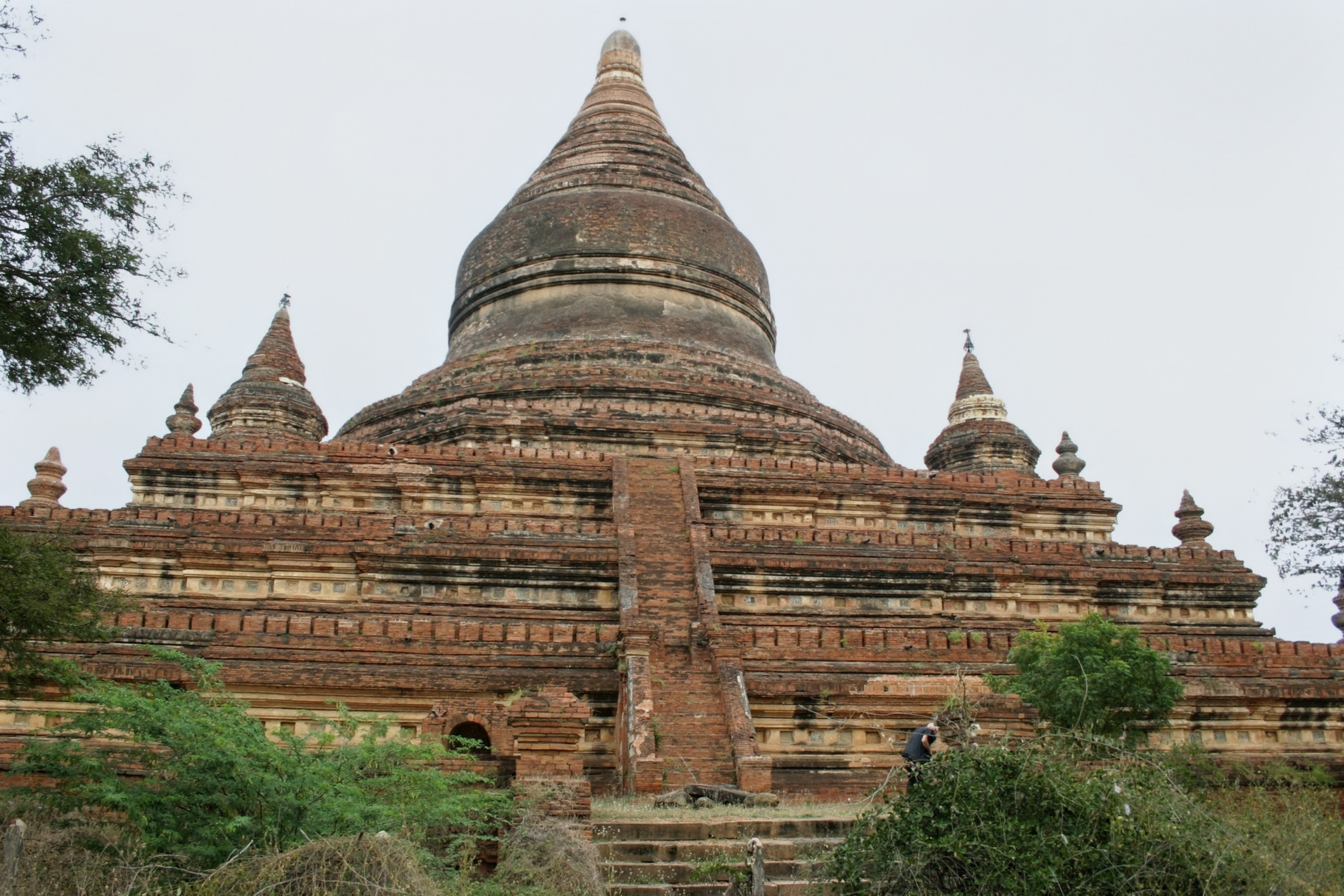
The Mingalazedi Pagoda built by Narathihapate

Her days as dowager queen were short. According to the chronicles, she became the chief queen of her step-son Narathihapate, who was put on the throne by the powerful court. But inscriptional evidence shows that Narathihapate's first chief queen was her elder sister Yadanabon, and Hla Wun became the chief queen only in 1262 after her sister's death.

Even if she was not the chief queen, Hla Wun quickly became the king's most trusted confidant and adviser. Chronicles recount several instances when she advised the king (even if he did not always take her advice). Her first key advice was to recall Yazathingyan to put down the rebellions. The king, who had just exiled the old minister, grudgingly agreed to her advice in 1258. Yazathingyan went on to put down the rebellions.

Most of the time, however, her job appeared to have been to control the wild, destructive excesses of the king, whom the chronicles describe as "an ogre", who was "great in wrath, haughtiness and envy, exceeding covetous and ambitious." Using her wit, she could often, though not always, overrule his impulsive, careless, paranoid decisions and talk him into making wiser decisions. Some were comparatively mundane: she once talked the king into rescinding a death sentence of a lady-in-waiting, whose only crime was to sneeze loudly in the king's audience. Some were of far more consequence: she, with the help of the Primate, got the king to issue a decree stating that his death sentences be suspended for a fortnight to allow his anger to cool. (The decree came too late to save Queen Saw Lon, whose death sentence prompted the king's remorse afterwards.)

Her success in controlling the widely despised king won her the support of the court and the public. But she had to keep her wits about her to avoid the wrath of an increasingly paranoid king who executed any perceived enemies. At any rate, she was the only one he trusted. The paranoid king put her in charge of managing his daily meals, which, according to the chronicles must total 300 dishes. (He also made all his queens and children eat the same meals at the same time with him.)

=== In exile ===
Hla Wun remained loyal to the end but she had long lost respect for the king. In 1285, she accompanied the king who had decided to flee to Lower Burma from the latest Mongol invasion rather than fight. There, she reportedly had to console her immature, gluttonous husband who dejectedly sobbed after learning that he would have to make do with just 150-dish dinners. In 1287, the king officially became a Mongol vassal in exchange for a Mongol withdrawal from northern Burma, and planned to return to Pagan. The queen advised him not to return to the upcountry without having first raised a substantial army, for much of the country was in revolt, and to avoid the Prome route, for she believed Thihathu, the viceroy of Prome, was not trustworthy. The king discarded her advice on both counts. He replied that he would raise an army at Prome with the help of his son Thihathu. The royal family sailed up the Irrawaddy with a small group of guards.

At Prome, as she predicted, Thihathu's men seized the royal flotilla, and Thihathu asked his father to choose between taking the poisoned food and dying by sword. The king asked his chief queen one last time for advice. On her advice, he bestowed his royal ring to her, prayed that "may no male-child be ever born to him again in all his future existences before attaining the nirvana", and consumed his last meal. Thihathu did spare her life.

== Kingmaker ==
Narathihapate's death officially marked the end of the two-and-a-half-century-old Pagan Empire. The country was in chaos, with each region claiming a king. Now, the dowager queen, Hla Wun managed to return to Pagan, hoping to restore the kingdom. At Pagan, she became the leader of the remaining old court. A year and a half after her husband's death, on 30 May 1289, she put one of Narathihapate's sons, Kyawswa, on the throne. For some reason, she did not choose her only son (and child) Yazathu as king. (Note: The son may have been unwell. Per (Ba Shin 1982: 39), Yazathu died on 10 May 1291 (Thursday, 11th waxing of Nayon 653 ME). The inscription at a temple she dedicated right after the son's death shows that she was devastated by the death.)

Though it is not universally accepted, one assessment of the inscriptional evidence finds that she may have died c. 1295/1296. The standard Burmese chronicles Maha Yazawin and Hmannan Yazawin say she lived longer, anointing at least one more king of Pagan. Hmannan says she lived to at least 1313 when she gave her official blessing to the coronation of Thihathu of Myinsaing (not the patricide Thihathu of Prome).

According to the chronicles, she was hugely disappointed by the ineffectual Kyawswa whose real authority did not extend beyond a small region around Pagan. The real power in central Burma now belonged to the three former Pagan commanders and brothers from the nearby Myinsaing. She felt betrayed when Kyawswa, who wanted to counter the rising power of the brothers, decided to become a vassal of the Mongols in 1297. Though she did not care much for the three brothers, whom she viewed as usurpers, she plotted with them to remove Kyawswa. In December 1297, she persuaded Kyawswa to visit Myinsaing, ostensibly to lead a dedication ceremony of a monastery. Kyawswa felt secure and went to Myinsaing. But as soon as the ceremony was over, he was arrested, dethroned, and forced to become a monk in the very monastery he had just dedicated.

The queen now placed Saw Hnit, a 14-year-old son of Kyawswa, on the throne. Though he was still styled as king, the inexperienced Saw Hnit was for all intents and purposes, a puppet of the three brothers, his regents. (Note: (Maha Yazawin Vol. 1 2006: 259): The charade ended on 20 October 1309 when the youngest Thihathu officially proclaimed himself king. Saw Hnit did not protest but the eldest brother Athinhkaya apparently did. Athinhkaya was assassinated by Thihathu on 13 April 1310 per (Maha Yazawin Vol. 1 2006: 254).) She had to accept the arrangement although she never fully acknowledged the presence of a new dynasty in Upper Burma. Nevertheless, she remained the symbol of the old dynasty, and her imprimatur was still much sought after. According to Hmannan, Thihathu asked her to anoint him as the rightful successor of Pagan at his coronation ceremony at Pinya. The queen flat out refused; in fact, she was quite insulting in her reply. It was only after Thihathu sent another humble letter that she relented. On 7 February 1313, at Thihathu's coronation ceremony, the dowager queen presented to Thihathu a golden belt and a golden tray, which had been handed down in the royal family since the time of King Anawrahta.

== Historicity ==
The historical Queen Pwa Saw did exist. In fact, a 1966 analysis of the contemporary inscriptions by Ba Shin finds that there were at least three Pwa Saws: Saw Min Waing, Saw Hla Wun and Saw Thitmahti. (There was also a fourth Pwa Saw in the Pinya period; she was Mi Saw U.) All three queens left a number of stone inscriptions at the temples and monasteries they donated. For example, a 1301 stone inscription found within the walls of the Hsutaungbyei Pagoda states that on 20 July 1301 (Note: Thursday, the full moon of Wagaung 663 ME (Thursday, 20 July 1301)) one Queen Pwa Saw dedicated 3000 palm trees during an illness of the king, presumably the puppet king Saw Hnit.

Some of the points in Ba Shin's analysis are: (Note: See (Ba Shin 1982) for the full paper.)

1. The personal name of Narapathihapate's chief queen Pwa Saw was Saw Hla Wun. The chronicles do not mention her personal name.
2. Saw Hla Wun was of royal descent. The chronicles' account that she was a commoner country girl is incorrect.
3. Hla Wun became the chief queen only in 1262, not at the coronation of Narathihapate [in November 1256].
4. Hla Wun was also a queen of King Kyawswa.
5. She was likely dead by 1295/96.
6. After her death, her younger sister, Saw Thitmahti, became the chief queen of Kyawswa, (as well as that of Saw Hnit), and became known as Pwa Saw herself. The paper cites a 1302 inscription by Thitmathi, (Note: The 1302 inscription found near the Thimahti Pagoda states that "on Friday, the 12th waxing of Waso 664 ME (Thursday, 7 June 1302; if it was on a Friday, the date would be 8 June 1302), Queen Thitmahti dedicated a brick monastery on the land granted to her by the king, after the death of her sister...") which mentions that her elder sister the queen had died before Kyawswa's dethronement [in 1297].

It is unclear if the paper has been peer-reviewed. (Note: The paper is in Burmese. It is unclear if there is an English translation or if non-Burmese reading international Burma scholars have reviewed it. At any rate, the paper seems to be held in high regard as it was reprinted in 1982 by the Burma Historical Research Department in its Silver Jubilee publication.) Not all of the points seem to be accepted by scholarship. (Note: Per (Maha Yazawin Vol. 1 2006: 234, footnote 1), the editors of the 2006 edition of Maha Yazawin from the Universities Historical Research Department agree that there were three Pwa Saws in the late Pagan period. But they do not say that Hla Wun was Kyawswa's queen, or that Hla Wun and Thamahti were sisters. Since Ba Shin's date of her death depends on the two queens being sisters, the editors seem to be staying with the chronicle narrative that Hla Wun lived beyond 1296.)

== In popular culture ==
Queen Pwa Saw is remembered as witty, wise, and beautiful, exercising political influence for 40 years during one of the most difficult periods in Burmese history.

- She Was a Queen, a fiction by Maurice Collis
- A song about her by Dora Than E
- Moe-hnaung Thandin A-Kha (မိုးနှောင်းသံထင်အခါ), a 2022 novel by Khin Mya Zin

== Bibliography ==
- Ba Shin, Bo-Hmu (1982) [1966]. "The Pwa Saws of Bagan" (PDF). Burma Historical Research Department Silver Jubilee Publication (in Burmese). Yangon: Historical Research Department. Archived from the original (PDF) on 2016-03-04.
- Harvey, G.E. (1925). History of Burma: From the Earliest Times to 10 March 1824. London: Frank Cass & Co. Ltd.
- Htin Aung, Maung (1967). A History of Burma. New York and London: Cambridge University Press.
- Kala, U (2006) [1724]. Maha Yazawin (in Burmese). Vol. 1–3 (4th printing ed.). Yangon: Ya-Pyei Publishing.
- Lockard, Craig (2009). Southeast Asia in World History (illustrated ed.). Oxford University Press. ISBN 9780195160758.
- Pe, Maung Tin; Luce, G.H. The Glass Palace Chronicle of the Kings of Burma (1960 ed.). Rangoon University Press.
- Royal Historical Commission of Burma (2003) [1832]. Hmannan Yazawin (in Burmese). Vol. 1–3. Yangon: Ministry of Information, Myanmar.
- Taw, Sein Ko; Emanuel Forchhammer; Tun Nyein (1899). Inscriptions of Pagan, Pinya and Ava: Translation, with Notes. Rangoon: Archaeological Survey of India.
- Than Tun (December 1959). "History of Burma: A.D. 1300–1400". Journal of Burma Research Society. XLII (II).
- Than Tun (1964). Studies in Burmese History (in Burmese). Vol. 1. Yangon: Maha Dagon.

Pwa Saw Pagan Dynasty Born: c. 1240 Died: c. 1310s (or 1295/96)
Royal titles
Preceded by Yadanabon II	Chief queen consort of Burma; 1262–1287	Succeeded by Pwa Saw of Thitmahti as Chief Queen of Pagan
Preceded by Saw Min Waing	Queen of the Northern Palace; 1256–1262	Succeeded by Saw Soe
