= Uzana =

Uzana may refer to:

- Uzana of Pagan (1213–1256), King of Pagan
- Uzana of Bassein (died 1287), governor of Pathein, eldest son and heir-presumptive of the last Pagan king
- Uzana II of Pagan (1311–1368), viceroy of Pagan
- Uzana I of Pinya (1298–1356/1357), King of Pinya
- Uzana II of Pinya (1324/25–1364), briefly and nominally King of Pinya

== See also ==
- Htilominlo (1175–1235), also known as Zeya Theinkha Uzana, King of Pagan
- Usana (disambiguation)
