= Saw U of Myinsaing =

Saw U စောဦး

Chief queen consort of Myinsaing
- Tenure: 17 December 1297 – 13 April 1310
- Predecessor: new office
- Successor: Saw Htut of Pinya as Vicereine of Myinsaing
- Born: c. 1250s Pagan (Bagan)
- Died: ?
- Spouse: Athinkhaya
- Issue: ?
- House: Pagan
- Father: Thihathu of Pagan?
- Mother: ?
- Religion: Theravada Buddhism

Saw U (Burmese: စောဦး, pronounced [sɔ́ ʔú]) was the chief queen consort of King Athinkhaya of Myinsaing from 1297 to 1310. According to a contemporary inscription, she was a granddaughter of King Uzana of Pagan and Queen Thonlula. (Note: Her father may have been Thihathu of Pagan, the only offspring of Uzana and Thonlula mentioned in the royal chronicles (although chronicles do not explicitly say that Thihathu was the only child of the royal couple.) If Thihathu was her father, who was executed probably between May and November 1256 per (Than Tun 1964: 134–135), she must have been born in or before 1257 at the latest.)

== Bibliography ==
- Royal Historical Commission of Burma (1832). Hmannan Yazawin (in Burmese). Vol. 1–3 (2003 ed.). Yangon: Ministry of Information, Myanmar.
- Than Tun (1964). Studies in Burmese History (in Burmese). Vol. 1. Yangon: Maha Dagon.

Saw U of Myinsaing Myinsaing Kingdom
Royal titles
New title	Chief queen consort of Myinsaing; 17 December 1297 – 13 April 1310	Succeeded by Saw Htut as Vicereine
