= Saw Hnit =

Saw Hnit စောနှစ်

Viceroy of Pagan
- Reign: 1299–1325
- Coronation: 8 May 1299
- Predecessor: Kyawswa
- Successor: Uzana II
- Born: 1283 (Saturday born); Pagan (Bagan)
- Died: 1325 (aged 42); Pagan
- Consort: Saw Thitmahti
- Issue: Uzana II; Atula Sanda Dewi; Yazathura of Pinle (Note: (Hmannan Vol. 2 2003: 82): Yazathura was the younger brother of Atula Sanda. His children were Min Letya of Nyaungyan and Yandathu I of Lanbu.)
- House: Pagan
- Father: Kyawswa
- Mother: Saw Soe
- Religion: Theravada Buddhism

Saw Hnit (Burmese: စောနှစ်, pronounced [sɔ́ n̥ɪʔ]; also spelled စောနစ်, [sɔ́ nɪʔ], Saw Nit or Min Lulin; 1283–1325) was a viceroy of Pagan (Bagan) from 1297 to 1325 under the suzerain of Myinsaing Kingdom in central Burma (Myanmar). He was a son of the Mongol vassal king Kyawswa, and a grandson of Narathihapate, the last sovereign king of Pagan dynasty. Saw Hnit succeeded as "king" after his father was forced to abdicate the throne by the three brothers of Myinsaing in December 1297.

The brothers put him on the throne, officially styled as the king of Pagan, but essentially their viceroy. His authority amounted to the region around the Pagan city. The viceroy gave his first audience on 8 May 1299. He raised his father's chief queen Saw Thitmahti as his own chief queen. Two days later, the three brothers executed his brother Theingapati and his father Kyawswa.

King Swa Saw Ke of Ava (r. 1367–1400) was a grandnephew of Saw Hnit.

== Dates ==
Saw Hnit was a son of King Kyawswa. The table below lists the dates given by the four main chronicles.

Chronicles	Birth–Death	Age	Reign	Length of reign
Zatadawbon Yazawin	1285/86–1331/32	46	1300/01–1331/32	31
Maha Yazawin	1285/86–1322/23	37	1300/01–1322/23	22
Yazawin Thit	1279/80–1330/31	51	1298/99–1330/31	32
Hmannan Yazawin	1283/84–1325/26	42	1298/99–1325/26	27

== Ancestry ==
The following is the ancestry of Saw Hnit as reported by the Hmannan Yazawin chronicle (Hmannan Vol. 1 2003: 360, 402–403). He was descended from Pagan kings from both sides. His parents were second cousins, once removed.

Ancestry of Saw Hnit

8. Uzana of Pagan
4. Narathihapate
9. Su Le Htone of Pagan
2. Kyawswa of Pagan
10. unnamed
5. Shin Hpa of Pagan
11. unnamed
1. Saw Hnit
12. unnamed
6. Yazathingyan of Pagan
13. unnamed
3. Saw Soe of Pagan
14. Kyaswa of Pagan
7. Saw Khin Htut of Pagan
15. Yaza Dewi of Pagan

== Bibliography ==
- Coedès, George (1968). Walter F. Vella (ed.). The Indianized States of Southeast Asia. trans.Susan Brown Cowing. University of Hawaii Press. ISBN 978-0-8248-0368-1.
- Harvey, G. E. (1925). History of Burma: From the Earliest Times to 10 March 1824. London: Frank Cass & Co. Ltd.
- Htin Aung, Maung (1967). A History of Burma. New York and London: Cambridge University Press.
- Kala, U (2006) [1724]. Maha Yazawin (in Burmese). Vol. 1–3 (4th printing ed.). Yangon: Ya-Pyei Publishing.
- Royal Historical Commission of Burma (2003) [1832]. Hmannan Yazawin (in Burmese). Vol. 1–3. Yangon: Ministry of Information, Myanmar.
- Than Tun (December 1959). "History of Burma: A.D. 1300–1400". Journal of Burma Research Society. XLII (II).

Saw Hnit Pagan Dynasty Born: 1283 Died: 1325
Royal titles
Preceded by Kyawswa as Mongol vassal (1297)	Viceroy of Pagan; 1299–1325	Succeeded by Uzana II
