= Yazathu of Pagan =

Yazathu ရာဇသူ

Prince of Pagan
- Reign: c. 1260–1291
- Born: c. 1260; Pagan (Bagan)
- Died: 10 May 1291; Thursday, 11th waxing of Nayon 653 ME; Pagan
- House: Pagan
- Father: Narathihapate
- Mother: Saw Hla Wun
- Religion: Theravada Buddhism

Yazathu (Burmese: ရာဇသူ, pronounced [jàza̰θù]; c. 1260 – 10 May 1291) was the only son of King Narathihapate and his chief queen Saw Hla Wun. By birth, Yazathu should have been the heir-presumptive although the chronicles do not specifically mention any heirs apparent during Narathihapate's reign. After the king's death in 1287, Yazathu did not become king. His powerful mother instead placed Kyawswa, a son of Narathihapate by a junior queen, on the throne in 1289. A surviving inscription from 1290 states that the prince and his mother donated a monastery. The prince died in 1291.

== Bibliography ==
- Ba Shin, Bo-Hmu (1966). "The Pwa Saws of Bagan" (PDF). Burma Historical Research Department Silver Jublice Publication (in Burmese) (1982 ed.). Yangon: Historical Research Department. Archived from the original (PDF) on 2016-03-04.

Yazathu of Pagan Pagan Dynasty Born: c. 1260 Died: 10 May 1291
Royal titles
Preceded by	Prince of Pagan c. 1260 – 1291	Succeeded by
