= Pwadawgyi of Pagan =

Pwadawgyi ဖွားတော်ကြီး

Chief Queen Consort of Burma
- Tenure: 1211 – 1231 or 1235
- Predecessor: Taung Pyinthe II (Sithu II)
- Successor: Shin Saw or Yaza Dewi
- Born: Pagan (Bagan)
- Died: Pagan
- Spouse: Htilominlo
- Issue: Theinpatei; Taya Mun
- House: Pagan
- Father: Ottathu
- Religion: Theravada Buddhism

Pwadawgyi (Burmese: ဖွားတော်ကြီး, pronounced [pʰwá dɔ̀ dʑí]) was the chief queen consort of King Htilominlo of the Pagan Dynasty of Myanmar (Burma). Her personal name is lost to history. Pwadawgyi simply means "Royal Grandmother". She was a great granddaughter of King Sithu I. She and Htilominlo had two children named Theinpatei and Taya Mun. Taya Mun died young.

== Bibliography ==
- Kala, U (1724). Maha Yazawin (in Burmese). Vol. 1–3 (2006, 4th printing ed.). Yangon: Ya-Pyei Publishing.
- Maha Sithu (2012) [1798]. Kyaw Win; Thein Hlaing (eds.). Yazawin Thit (in Burmese). Vol. 1–3 (2nd ed.). Yangon: Ya-Pyei Publishing.
- Royal Historical Commission of Burma (1832). Hmannan Yazawin (in Burmese). Vol. 1–3 (2003 ed.). Yangon: Ministry of Information, Myanmar.
- Than Tun (1964). Studies in Burmese History (in Burmese). Vol. 1. Yangon: Maha Dagon.

Pwadawgyi of Pagan Pagan Kingdom
Royal titles
Preceded by Taung Pyinthe II (Sithu II)	Chief Queen Consort of Burma; 18 August 1211 – 1231 or 19 July 1235	Succeeded by Shin Saw or Yaza Dewi
