= Uzana of Bassein =

Uzana of Bassein ဥဇနာ

Heir-presumptive of Burma
- Reign: 12?? – 1287
- Predecessor: Thihathu of Pagan
- Successor: Theingapati
- Born: 1250s? Pagan (Bagan)
- Died: 1287; Bassein (Pathein)
- Spouse: Saw San
- House: Pagan
- Father: Narathihapate
- Mother: Saw Nan
- Religion: Theravada Buddhism

Uzana of Bassein (Burmese: ဥဇနာ, pronounced [ʔṵzənà]; d. 1287) was the eldest son of King Narathihapate, the last sovereign king of the Pagan Empire, and the heir-presumptive of the Pagan throne. Uzana, son of Queen Saw Nan and a grandnephew of powerful Queen Shin Saw, was granted Bassein (Pathein) in fief. Uzana was one of Narathihapate's sons ruling the southern parts of the kingdom. Uzana ruled the Irrawaddy delta from Bassein while his half-brothers Thihathu and Kyawswa ruled Prome and Dala (modern Twante) respectively.

In 1285, Narathihapate fled Pagan (Bagan) to Lower Burma in panic as the Mongol invasion advanced. In 1287, Thihathu, Viceroy of Prome (Pyay), arrested his father and forced the king to take poison. To refuse would have meant death by the sword, and with a prayer on his lips that in all his future existences "may no male-child be ever born to him again", the king swallowed the poison and died.

Having killed the king, Thihathu next tried to kill off his two rival half-brothers, Uzana and Kyawswa as they were also potential claimants to the throne. Thihathu first went to Bassein, entered Uzana's chambers, and hacked Uzana, who laid sick in his chamber, to pieces. He then sailed to Dala to kill Kyawswa. At the Dala harbor, as he tried to shoot one of the guards with his crossbow, he accidentally killed himself by his own arrow.

== Bibliography ==
- Htin Aung, Maung (1967). A History of Burma. New York and London: Cambridge University Press.
- Pe Maung Tin; Luce, G.H. (1960) [1923]. The Glass Palace Chronicle of the Kings of Burma. Rangoon University Press.
- Royal Historical Commission of Burma (2003) [1832]. Hmannan Yazawin (in Burmese). Vol. 1–3. Yangon: Ministry of Information, Myanmar.

Uzana of Bassein Pagan Dynasty Born: c. 1250s Died: 1287
Royal titles
Preceded by Thihathu of Pagan	Heir to the Burmese Throne ? – 1287	Succeeded by Theingapati
Preceded by	Governor of Bassein; 12?? – 1287	Succeeded by
