= Saw Soe of Pagan =

Saw Soe စောစိုး

Queen of the Northern Palace
- Tenure: 30 May 1289 – 17 December 1297
- Predecessor: Pwa Saw
- Successor: Yadanabon of Pinya
- Born: 1250s Pagan (Bagan)
- Died: in or after 1334; Pagan
- Spouse: Kyawswa of Pagan
- Issue: Saw Hnit; Min Shin Saw of Thayet; Saw Min Ya of Pinya; Saw Hnaung of Sagaing; Mway Medaw of Pinya
- House: Pagan
- Father: Yazathingyan of Pagan
- Mother: Saw Khin Htut of Pagan
- Religion: Theravada Buddhism

Saw Soe (Burmese: စောစိုး, pronounced [sɔ́ só]) was a principal queen consort of King Kyawswa of the Pagan Dynasty of Burma (Myanmar). The royal chronicles identify her as the chief queen of Kyawswa but historians identify Saw Thitmahti as the chief queen.

The queen was the mother of Viceroy of Pagan Saw Hnit, Governor of Thayet Min Shin Saw, Queen Saw Min Ya of Pinya, Queen Saw Hnaung of Sagaing and Queen Mway Medaw of Pinya. She was also the paternal grandmother of King Swa Saw Ke of Ava.

== Ancestry ==
The following is her ancestry as reported by the Hmannan Yazawin chronicle. She was a descendant of Gen. Nyaung-U Hpi from her father's side and a granddaughter of King Kyaswa from her mother's side.

Ancestry of Queen Saw Soe

8. unnamed
4. unnamed
9. unnamed
2. Yazathingyan of Pagan
10. unnamed
5. unnamed
11. unnamed
1. Saw Soe
12. Htilominlo
6. Kyaswa of Pagan
13. Eindawthe
3. Saw Khin Htut of Pagan
14. unnamed
7. Yaza Dewi of Pagan
15. unnamed

== Bibliography ==
- Ba Shin, Bo-Hmu (1966). "The Pwa Saws of Bagan" (PDF). Burma Historical Research Department Silver Jublice Publication (in Burmese) (1982 ed.). Yangon: Historical Research Department. Archived from the original (PDF) on 2016-03-04.
- Royal Historical Commission of Burma (1832). Hmannan Yazawin (in Burmese). Vol. 1–3 (2003 ed.). Yangon: Ministry of Information, Myanmar.

Saw Soe of Pagan Pagan Dynasty Born: c. 1250s Died: in/after 1334
Royal titles
Preceded by Pwa Saw	Queen of the Northern Palace; 1289–1297	Succeeded by Yadanabon of Pinya as North Queen of Myinsaing–Pinya
