= Saw U (disambiguation) =

Saw U may mean:

== Musical instruments ==
- Saw u, Thai musical instrument

== Name of Burmese royals ==
- Saw U of Myinsaing, Chief queen consort of Myinsaing
- Mi Saw U, Chief queen consort of Pinya
- Saw U of Mrauk-U, Queen of the Northern Palace of Mrauk-U
