= Seiktein =

Seiktein Seiktain, Seikhtain
- Town
- Location in Burma
- Coordinates: 21°03′N 95°15′E
- Country: Burma
- Region: Mandalay Region
- District: Myingyan
- Township: Kyaukpadaung
- Time zone: UTC+6.30 (GMT+6:30)

Seiktein is a town in Mandalay Region in Central Myanmar. It lies just north of Mount Popa, on the Kyaukpadaung–Taungtha road. The town is in two parts, Seiktein North and Seiktein South along the road.

== Notable citizens ==
- Asaw, Queen of Uzana and mother of Narathihapate and Tayabya.
