= Saw Nan of Pagan =

Saw Nan စောနန်း

Queen consort of Burma
- Tenure: c. 1258 – 1287
- Spouse: Narathihapate
- Issue: Uzana of Bassein; Pwa Saw Shin
- House: Pagan
- Religion: Theravada Buddhism

Saw Nan (Burmese: စောနန်း, pronounced [sɔ́ náɴ]) was a queen consort of King Narathihapate of the Pagan Dynasty of Burma (Myanmar). She was also a niece of the chief queen Saw Hla Wun. Her son Uzana later became viceroy of Bassein.

== Bibliography ==
- Royal Historical Commission of Burma (1832). Hmannan Yazawin (in Burmese). Vol. 1–3 (2003 ed.). Yangon: Ministry of Information, Myanmar.
