= Saw Htut of Pinya =

Saw Htut စောထွတ်

Chief queen consort of Pinya
- Tenure: 1 September 1340 – 29 March 1344
- Predecessor: Atula Maha Dhamma Dewi
- Successor: Atula Sanda Dewi

Vicereine of Myinsaing
- Tenure: after 13 April 1310 – 1 September 1340
- Predecessor: Saw U of Myinsaing
- Spouse: Sithu of Pinya
- Issue: Saw Gyi; Saw Einthe
- House: Pinya
- Religion: Theravada Buddhism

Saw Htut (Burmese: စောထွတ်, pronounced [sɔ́ tʰʊʔ]) was the chief consort of Sithu of Pinya from 1340 to 1344. Her husband is not mentioned in any of the royal chronicles. He only appears in a Pinya era inscription as "King" Myinsaing Sithu. Sithu, who according to the inscription succeeded Uzana I, may have been a regent for his nephew and son-in-law Kyawswa I of Pinya. Their elder daughter Saw Gyi was married to Kyawswa I.

== Bibliography ==
- Than Tun (December 1959). "History of Burma: A.D. 1300–1400". Journal of Burma Research Society. XLII (II).

Saw Htut of Pinya Myinsaing Dynasty
Royal titles
Preceded by Atula Maha Dhamma Dewi	Chief queen consort of Pinya; 1340–1344	Succeeded by Atula Sanda Dewi
Preceded by Saw U of Myinsaing as Chief queen consort	Vicereine of Myinsaing; 1310–1340	Succeeded by
