= Usana =

Usana may refer to:

- Usana (planthopper), a genus of insects
- USANA Health Sciences, an American company
- Ushana, a king in Indian mythology
- Ushanas or Shukra, a Hindu deity associated with Venus
  - Usanas or Kavyamata, mother of the deity
- Ushnas, an Indian poet of Gujarati
  - Ushnas Prize, a price for Gujarati literature, named after the poet

== See also ==
- Uzana (disambiguation)
- USANA Amphitheatre, in Utah, US
