= Saw Lon of Pagan =

Saw Lon စောလုံ

Queen consort of Burma
- Tenure: c. 1260s – 1270s
- Died: Pagan (Bagan)
- Spouse: Narathihapate
- Issue: none
- House: Pagan
- Religion: Theravada Buddhism

Saw Lon (Burmese: စောလုံ, pronounced [sɔ́ lòʊɴ]) was a queen consort of King Narathihapate of the Pagan Dynasty of Burma (Myanmar). She was a favorite of the king but later executed for trying to poison the king.

== Brief ==
According to the royal chronicles, during one new year's water festival, the king asked a young female attendant to drench Queen Saw Lon with water in front of everyone. The queen was all wet from head to toe, and held a grudge against the king. One day, she put poison in the king's food, and asked a fellow queen Shin Mauk to present it to the king. Chronicles continue that the king was about to eat, the dog below the table sneezed, and the king decided to give the food to the dog. The dog ate it, and died soon after. Saw Lon was arrested. As Saw Lon approached the king, he inquired about the reason behind her poisoning attempt. She retorted, "Hay, grandson of turner! Have you conveniently erased the memory of your public humiliation towards me at water festival?" (ဟယ် ပန်းပွတ်သည်မြေး နင် ငါ့ကို ဧရာဝတီမြစ်ထဲ လူပုံအလယ်မှာ အရှက်ခွဲခဲ့တာ မေ့နေပြီလား). Saw Lon fearlessly brought to light the ancestral lineage of the king, revealing that King Narathihapate's mother originated from Myittha village, as the daughter of a turner. When she admitted to plotting, the king angrily ordered her burned alive inside an iron cage. She was able to delay the execution by a week by heavily bribing her executioners to delay the construction of the cage. She spent her last days in religion, meditating and reviewing her understanding of the Abhidhamma. She was burned alive on the seventh day.

Subsequently, King Narathihapate experienced deep regret as he came to terms with the execution of his cherished Queen Saw Lon, carried out under his own commands. He grappled with intense remorse, often grieving, and murmuring, "Saw Lon... just wait for me" (စောလုံ စောင့်ပါ ခလှည့်). The king build a stupa known as the Mingalazedi Pagoda, serving as a replica of the Shwezigon Pagoda, in memory of his queen. This stupa was situated to the north of the Myinkaba Village. During the construction of this pagoda, King Narathihapate instructed the masonry workers to replicate the design of the Shwezegon Pagoda. He warned that any deviation from the Shwezegon Pagoda's appearance would lead to dire consequences for the lives of the masons involved. In Burmese history, that event eventually gave rise to the enduring proverb "အကျီစားသန်က ရန်များ၏" (Excessive mockery can lead a person into the midst of adversaries).

== Bibliography ==
- Harvey, G. E. (1925). History of Burma: From the Earliest Times to 10 March 1824. London: Frank Cass & Co. Ltd.
- Royal Historical Commission of Burma (1832). Hmannan Yazawin (in Burmese). Vol. 1–3 (2003 ed.). Yangon: Ministry of Information, Myanmar.
