= Yadanabon II of Pagan =

Yadanabon II ရတနာပုံ

Chief queen consort of Burma
- Tenure: 1256–1262
- Coronation: November 1256
- Predecessor: Thonlula
- Successor: Saw Hla Wun
- Born: 1230s
- Died: 1262; Pagan (Bagan)
- Spouse: Narathihapate
- House: Pagan
- Father: Thray
- Mother: Min Mi
- Religion: Theravada Buddhism

Yadanabon (Burmese: ရတနာပုံ, pronounced [jədənàbòʊɴ]) was the first chief queen consort of King Narathihapate of Pagan Dynasty of Burma (Myanmar). She was a granddaughter of King Kyaswa and Queen Saw Mon Hla, and a niece of Queen Thonlula. Note that the royal chronicles do not mention her as a queen at all; instead, they mention her sister Saw Hla Wun, who later became famous as Pwa Saw, as the only chief queen. But inscriptional evidence shows that Yadanabon was the first chief queen, and that Hla Wun became the chief queen only in 1262, following Yadanabon's death.

== Bibliography ==
- Ba Shin, Bo-Hmu (1966). "The Pwa Saws of Bagan" (PDF). Burma Historical Research Department Silver Jubilee Publication (in Burmese) (1982 ed.). Yangon: Historical Research Department. Archived from the original (PDF) on 2016-03-04.
- Royal Historical Commission of Burma (1832). Hmannan Yazawin (in Burmese). Vol. 1–3 (2003 ed.). Yangon: Ministry of Information, Myanmar.

Yadanabon II of Pagan Pagan Kingdom Born: c. 1230s Died: 1262
Royal titles
Preceded by Thonlula	Chief queen consort of Burma; 1256–1262	Succeeded by Saw Hla Wun
