= Thonlula =

Thonlula သုံးလူလ Ti Lawka Sanda II

Chief queen consort of Burma
- Tenure: c. May 1251 – May 1256
- Predecessor: Yaza Dewi
- Successor: Yadanabon II
- Born: c. 1220s Pagan (Bagan)
- Died: Unknown; Pagan
- Spouse: Uzana of Pagan
- Issue: Thihathu of Pagan
- House: Pagan
- Father: Kyaswa
- Mother: Yaza Dewi
- Religion: Theravada Buddhism

Ti Lawka Sanda Thonlula (Note: Thonlula is the direct translation of Ti Lawka Sanda, which is the Burmese transcription of Pali Ti-Loka Canda (Sanskrit: Tri-Loka Chandra).) (Burmese: တိလောက စန္ဒာ သုံးလူလ, pronounced [tḭlɔ́ka̰ sàɴdà θóʊɴ lù la̰]) was the chief queen consort of King Uzana of Pagan. Chronicles say that she was succeeded as chief queen by Saw Hla Wun but inscriptional evidence indicates that it was Yadanabon who succeeded.

== Bibliography ==
- Ba Shin, Bo-Hmu (1982) [1966]. "The Pwa Saws of Bagan" (PDF). Burma Historical Research Department Silver Jubilee Publication (in Burmese). Yangon: Historical Research Department.
- Kala, U (2006) [1724]. Maha Yazawin (in Burmese). Vol. 1–3 (4th printing ed.). Yangon: Ya-Pyei Publishing.
- Than Tun (1964). Studies in Burmese History (in Burmese). Vol. 1. Yangon: Maha Dagon.

Thonlula Pagan Kingdom Born: c. 1220s Died: ?
Royal titles
Preceded by Yaza Dewi of Pagan	Chief queen consort of Burma; 1251–1256	Succeeded by Yadanabon II
