= Thihathu of Pagan =

Thihathu သီဟသူ

Heir Apparent of Burma
- Reign: c. May 1251 – May 1256
- Predecessor: Uzana of Pagan
- Successor: Uzana of Bassein
- Born: 1230s Pagan (Bagan)
- Died: 1256; Pagan?
- House: Pagan
- Father: Uzana of Pagan
- Mother: Thonlula
- Religion: Theravada Buddhism

Thihathu (Burmese: သီဟသူ, pronounced [θìha̰θù]; also known as Min Yin; 1230s–1256) was the crown prince of the Pagan dynasty of Burma (Myanmar) from 1251 to 1256. The prince was the senior of the two sons of King Uzana. He was seen as an arrogant, rude prince by the court led by the Chief Minister Yazathingyan. Chronicles say that the prince once spat on Yazathingyan, someone three decades his senior. When Uzana died from a hunting accident in May 1256, Yazathingyan persuaded the court to give the throne to Narathihapate, the fallen king's only other son by a concubine. The court arrested Thihathu, and presumably put him to death.

== Bibliography ==
- Royal Historical Commission of Burma (2003) [1832]. Hmannan Yazawin (in Burmese). Vol. 1–3. Yangon: Ministry of Information, Myanmar.
- Than Tun (1964). Studies in Burmese History (in Burmese). Vol. 1. Yangon: Maha Dagon.

Thihathu of Pagan Pagan Dynasty Born: 1230s Died: 1256
Royal titles
Preceded by Uzana of Pagan	Heir Apparent of Burma; 1251 – 1256	Succeeded by Uzana of Bassein
