= Uzana II of Pagan =

Uzana II of Pagan ဥဇနာ

Viceroy of Pagan
- Reign: 1325/26–1368/69
- Predecessor: Saw Hnit
- Successor: Sithu (as governor)
- Born: 1311/12; Monday, c. 673 ME; Pagan; Myinsaing Kingdom
- Died: 1368/69 (aged 57); 730 ME; Pagan; Ava Kingdom
- Consort: Shwe Zaga
- Issue: Shwe Sitthin
- House: Pagan
- Father: Saw Hnit
- Religion: Theravada Buddhism

Uzana II of Pagan (Burmese: ဥဇနာ, pronounced [ʔṵzənà]; also Saw Mun Nit (စောမွန်နစ်); 1311–1368) was viceroy of Pagan (Bagan) from 1325 to 1364 under the suzerain of Pinya Kingdom, and from 1365 to 1368/69 under the Ava Kingdom. He was also the last of the Pagan dynasty which dated back at least to the mid-9th century. Though still styled as King of Pagan, Uzana's effective rule, like his father's and grandfather's, amounted to just the area around Pagan city. King Swa Saw Ke of Ava (r. 1367–1400) was a nephew of Uzana II.

== Historiography ==
Uzana was a son of Saw Hnit, the vassal king of Pagan. Various royal chronicles report slightly different dates with respect to his reign, as seen in the table below. (Note: See a summary table of all the Burmese kings in the first volume of the 2006 edition of the Maha Yazawin.) A contemporary inscription shows that he was in charge of Pagan by 1 September 1334. (Note: According to an inscription at the Thissawaddy Temple (in Pagan (Bagan)), Saw Mun Nit dedicated a group of bondsmen (kyun) to the temple on Thursday, the 3rd waxing of Thadingyut 696 ME, (Wednesday, 31 August 1334). If it indeed fell on a Thursday, the date should be Thursday, 1 September 1334.)

Chronicles	Birth–Death	Age at accession	Reign	Length of reign	Age at death	References
Zatadawbon Yazawin	c. 1317–1368/69; Monday born	14 (15th year)	1331/32–1368/69	37	51 (52nd year)	
Maha Yazawin and Hmannan Yazawin	c. 1311–1368/69; Monday born	14 (15th year)	1325/26–1368/69	43	57 (58th year)	
Yazawin Thit	c. 1310–1368/69; Monday born	20 (21st year)	1330/31–1368/69	38	58 (59th year)	

== Bibliography ==
- Htin Aung, Maung (1967). A History of Burma. New York and London: Cambridge University Press.
- Kala, U (2006) [1724]. Maha Yazawin (in Burmese). Vol. 1–3 (4th printing ed.). Yangon: Ya-Pyei Publishing.
- Maha Sithu (2012) [1798]. Kyaw Win; Thein Hlaing (eds.). Yazawin Thit (in Burmese). Vol. 1–3 (2nd ed.). Yangon: Ya-Pyei Publishing.
- Royal Historians of Burma (1960) [c. 1680]. U Hla Tin (Hla Thamein) (ed.). Zatadawbon Yazawin (in Burmese). Historical Research Directorate of the Union of Burma.
- Royal Historical Commission of Burma (2003) [1832]. Hmannan Yazawin (in Burmese). Vol. 1–3. Yangon: Ministry of Information, Myanmar.
- Taw, Sein Ko; Emanuel Forchhammer; Tun Nyein (1899). Inscriptions of Pagan, Pinya and Ava: Translation, with Notes. Rangoon: Archaeological Survey of India.

Uzana II of Pagan Pagan Dynasty Born: c. 1311 Died: 1368/69
Royal titles
Preceded by Saw Hnit	Viceroy of Pagan; 1325/26–1368/69	Succeeded by Sithu as governor
