= Tayoke =

Burmese term for Chinese people

Tayoke or Tayote (Burmese: တရုတ်, pronounced [təjoʊʔ]), formerly spelt tarup (တရုပ်) or taruk (တရုက်), is an exonym in the Burmese language used to refer to China and Chinese people. The reference of this term has not remained static throughout history; rather, it has sequentially referred to two or three different ethnic groups. It does not merely relate to a bounded territory with an unchanging population, but rather to an imagined space. Initially, Burmese used this term to refer to an entity located to the north of Myanmar, and also the peoples living beyond northern Myanmar. It broadened to refer to a large category, became a designation for China and the Chinese around the 19th and 20th centuries.

== Etymology ==
Currently, academic views on the origin of the word "Tayoke" mainly include theories such as "Turkic", "Darughachi", and "Dali".

Scholars such as Arthur Purves Phayre, Gordon Luce, Sao Saimong, and He Ping believe that the word "Tayoke" originates from "Turkic", as Turkic peoples were the primary components of the Mongol army during the Mongol invasion of Burma. Chen Yi-sein suggested that "Tayoke" evolved from "Drog", which is the Tibetan word for "Turk". In 1285, Kublai Khan ordered the Qocho royal, Sösök tigin, to lead troops into Tagaung, accompanied by Tibetan monks from 70 monasteries. In Tibetan language, Turks are called Drug (Droog) or Drugu (Droogoo). The Burmese learned from the Tibetan monks that the Mongol army was called Drug. However, as the Burmese language of the Bagan period lacked voiced D/G sounds, Drug was transliterated as Truk/Taruk.

In 1955, the Burmese Chinese newspaper The New Rangoon (新仰光報) proposed that "Tayoke" is a phonetic transcription of "Darughachi". This theory has been endorsed by scholars such as Chen Yan (陈炎) and Hu Axiang.

The Sinologist Paul Pelliot suggested that the etymology of "Tayoke" might originate from "Dali Kingdom".

Additionally, Goh Geok Yian suggested that besides the aforementioned theories, the etymology of "Tayoke" might also be related to the "Dayue" (Kushan Empire) or the "Tangut" (Western Xia), where Buddhism once flourished.

== History ==
Influenced by India, the Burmese language initially referred to China and Chinese people as "Chin" (စိန့်) or "Cinna" (စိန）, with variants such as "Cinnadeda" (စိနဒေသ), "CinnaRattha" (စိနရဌ), "SaintTine" (စိန့်တိုင်း), and "SaintPyi" (စိန့်ပြည်). After the Mongol invasion of Burma, Burmese began using "Tayoke" to refer to the Mongol / Yuan Dynasty. The Burmese were able to distinguish the differences in language, clothing, and lifestyle between the Mongol army and the Chinese people, and thus did not use the terms "Chin" or "Cinna" for the invaders from the northeast. The fact of the Mongol invasion remained in the minds of the Burmese for a long time. By the time of the Sino-Burmese War in 16th century, the Burmese no longer called the Chinese people "Chin" or "Cinna," but instead called them "Tayoke". During the later period of the Toungoo Dynasty, when China entered the Qing Dynasty, the Burmese used "Tayat" (တရက်) to refer to the Manchu people, but this gradually merged with "Tayoke", and no distinction was soon made.

During the Mongol invasion of Burma of 1285, King Narathihapate fled in fear of battle, thus earning the title Tarukpyèmeng (also transcripted as "Tarokpyemin"), meaning "the King who fled from the Tayoke." At the end of 1286, Narathihapate dispatched the senior monk Shin Dissapramok to lead a peace delegation to the Yuan capital (Dadu), where they were received by Kublai Khan. Upon his return, the Shin Dissapramok Inscription was erected in Bagan to record the details of the mission. The inscription used "Taruk King" to refer to Kublai Khan, serving as the earliest record of the term. Yazawin Kyaw, which was completed in 1520, used the term "Taruppye Min" to refer to Narathihapate, becaming the earliest Burmese chronicle which mentioned "Tayoke".

The Hmannan Yazawin, completed in 1832, used "Taruk" and "Taret" when recording the Tagaung Kingdom's invaders who "coming from a country to the east called Gandalarit, in the land of Tsin or Sin". Burmese chroniclers mistakenly grafted later terms onto early history. Goh Geok Yian pointed out that when the Hmannan Yazawin was compiled, China was under the highly centralized rule of the Qing Dynasty. Influenced by this, Burmese chroniclers project the concept of "Tayoke" as an all-encompassing category that referred to the Chinese in the past, and also make Tayoke/China as a single political unit.

== See also ==
- Chinese people in Myanmar
- Names of China
