= Pwa Saw of Thitmahti =

Pwa Saw of Thitmahti သစ်မထီး ဖွားစော

Chief queen consort of Pagan
- Reign: 1289 – 1325
- Predecessor: Pwa Saw as Queen of Burma
- Successor: unknown
- Born: c. 1250s Pagan (Bagan)
- Died: in or after 1334 (Note: (Ba Shin 1982: 42): G.H. Luce takes the inscription at the Thissawaddy Pagoda dated to 1334 as evidence as she was alive then. Ba Shin (Ba Shin 1982: 45) points out that the inscription, which was donated by one her servants, does not explicitly say that the dowager queen was still alive. He nonetheless agrees with Luce that she was probably still alive.); Pagan; Pinya Kingdom
- Spouse: Kyawswa; Saw Hnit
- Issue: Theingapati; Kumara Kassapa
- House: Pagan
- Religion: Theravada Buddhism

Pwa Saw of Thitmahti (Burmese: သစ်မထီး ဖွားစော, [θɪʔmətʰí pʰwá sɔ́] or [θəmətʰí pʰwá sɔ́]) was the chief queen consort of King Kyawswa, and of King Saw Hnit of the Pagan Dynasty of Burma (Myanmar). The royal chronicles identify Saw Soe as the chief queen of Kyawswa but historians identify her as the chief queen. She was the mother of Crown Prince Theingapati and Kumara Kassapa.

Thitmahti was one of the three historical Pagan period queens known by the epithet of Pwa Saw (lit. "Queen Grandmother", or queen dowager). According to an analysis of the contemporary stone inscriptions by Ba Shin, she was a younger sister of Queen Saw Hla Wun, and she may have succeeded her sister as the chief queen only in 1295/96. (A 1302 stone inscription found near the Thitmahti pagoda states that "on Friday, the 12th waxing of Waso 664 ME [Thursday, 7 June 1302], Queen Pwa Saw's sister dedicated a brick monastery on the land granted to her by the king, after she was raised to the throne after the death of her sister..."). The inscription also states that her aunt was a queen consort of King Kyaswa.

But not everyone accepts that Hla Wun was a queen of Kyawswa, two decades her junior, or that Thitmahti was a sister of Hla Wun. (Note: (Maha Yazawin Vol. 1 2006: 234, footnote 1): The editors of the 2006 edition of Maha Yazawin from the Universities Historical Research Department agree that there were three Pwa Saws in the late Pagan period. But they do not say that Hla Wun was Kyawswa's queen, or that Saw Hla Wun and Saw Thamathi were sisters. Since Ba Shin's date of her death depends on the two queens being sisters, the editors seem to be staying with the chronicle narrative that Hla Wun lived beyond 1296.)

== Bibliography ==
- Ba Shin, Bo-Hmu (1982) [1966]. "The Pwa Saws of Bagan" (PDF). Burma Historical Research Department Silver Jublice Publication (in Burmese). Yangon: Historical Research Department. Archived from the original (PDF) on 2016-03-04.
- Kala, U (2006) [1724]. Maha Yazawin (in Burmese). Vol. 1–3 (4th printing ed.). Yangon: Ya-Pyei Publishing.
- Royal Historical Commission of Burma (2003) [1832]. Hmannan Yazawin (in Burmese). Vol. 1–3. Yangon: Ministry of Information, Myanmar.
- Taw, Sein Ko; Emanuel Forchhammer (1899). Inscriptions of Pagan, Pinya and Ava: Translation, with Notes. Rangoon: Archaeological Survey of India.

Pwa Saw of Thitmahti Pagan Dynasty Born: c. 1250s Died: in/after 1334
Royal titles
Preceded by Saw Hla Wun	Chief queen consort of Pagan; 1289 – 1325	Unknown
