= Mingalazedi Pagoda =

Buddhist Pagoda in Bagan, Myanmar

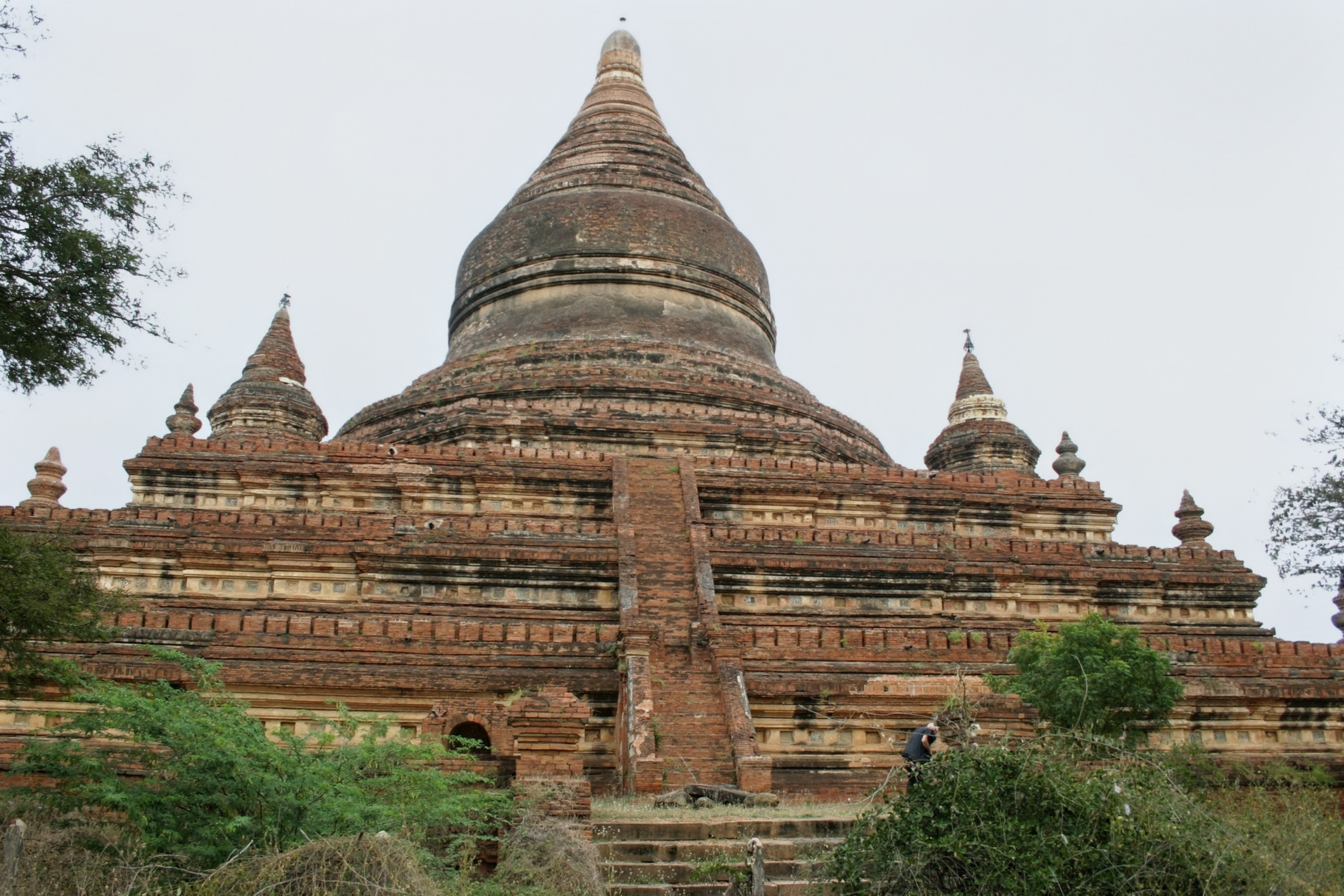
- Mingalazedi Pagoda

- Location within Myanmar

Religion
- Affiliation: Theravada Buddhism

Location
- Location: Bagan, Mandalay Region
- Country: Myanmar
- Coordinates: 21.161368°N 94.857729°E

Architecture
- Founder: King Narathihapate
- Completed: 1284; 742 years ago

Mingalazedi Pagoda (Burmese: မင်္ဂလာစေတီ, pronounced [mɪ̀ɰ̃ɡəlà zèdì]; also spelt Mingalar Zedi Pagoda) is a Buddhist stupa located in Bagan, in the Mandalay Region of Myanmar. Construction started in 1274 during the reign of King Narathihapate. The pagoda is one of the few temples in Bagan with a full set of glazed terra-cotta tiles depicting the Jataka. The pagoda was built in brick and contains several terraces leading to large pot-shaped stupa at its centre, topped by a bejewelled umbrella (hti). Mingalazedi Pagoda was built a few years before the First Burmese Empire (Bagan Kingdom) was pillaged by the Mongols.
