= Yaza Dewi of Pagan =

Yaza Dewi ရာဇဒေဝီ

Chief queen consort of Burma
- Tenure: 19 July 1235 – c. May 1251
- Predecessor: Shin Saw
- Successor: Thonlula
- Born: c. 1200s Pagan (Bagan)
- Died: Unknown; Pagan
- Spouse: Kyaswa
- Issue: Saw Khin Htut; Thonlula
- House: Pagan
- Religion: Theravada Buddhism

Yaza Dewi (Burmese: ရာဇဒေဝီ, pronounced [jàza̰ dèwì]) was the chief queen consort of King Kyaswa of Pagan. Her personal name was Shin Pwa Oo (ရှင်ဘွားဦး).

== Bibliography ==
- Kala, U (2006) [1724]. Maha Yazawin (in Burmese). Vol. 1–3 (4th printing ed.). Yangon: Ya-Pyei Publishing.
- Royal Historical Commission of Burma (2003) [1832]. Hmannan Yazawin (in Burmese). Vol. 1–3. Yangon: Ministry of Information, Myanmar.
- Than Tun (1964). Studies in Burmese History (in Burmese). Vol. 1. Yangon: Maha Dagon.

Yaza Dewi of Pagan Pagan Kingdom
Royal titles
Preceded by Shin Saw	Chief queen consort of Burma; 1235–1251	Succeeded by Thonlula
