= Kyawswa of Pagan =

King of Pagan (r. 1289 to 1297)

Kyawswa ကျော်စွာ

King of Pagan
- Reign: 30 May 1289 – 17 December 1297
- Predecessor: Narathihapate
- Successor: Saw Hnit
- Born: 2 August 1260; Monday, 10th waning of Wagaung 622 ME; Pagan
- Died: 10 May 1299 (aged 38); Sunday, 10th waxing of Nayon 661 ME; Myinsaing
- Consort: Saw Thitmahti; Saw Soe; Mi Saw U
- Issue: Theingapati; Kumara Kassapa; Saw Hnit; Min Shin Saw; Saw Min Ya; Saw Hnaung; Mway Medaw; Uzana I of Pinya
- House: Pagan
- Father: Narathihapate
- Mother: Shin Hpa
- Religion: Theravada Buddhism

Kyawswa (Burmese: ကျော်စွာ, pronounced [tɕɔ̀zwà]; 2 August 1260 – 10 May 1299) was king of the Pagan dynasty of Burma (Myanmar) from 1289 to 1297. Son of the last sovereign king of Pagan Narathihapate, Kyawswa was one of many "kings" that emerged after the collapse of the Pagan Empire in 1287. Though still styled as King of Pagan, Kyawswa's effective rule amounted to just the area around Pagan city. Felt threatened by the three brothers of Myinsaing, who were nominally his viceroys, Kyawswa decided to become a vassal of the Yuan dynasty, and received such recognition from the Yuan in March 1297. He was ousted by the brothers in December 1297 and killed, along with his son, Theingapati, on 10 May 1299.

== Early life ==
Kyawswa was a son of King Narathihapate and Queen Shin Hpa. He was born on 2 August 1260. The table below lists the dates given by the four main chronicles.

Chronicles	Birth–Death	Age	Reign	Length of reign
Zatadawbon Yazawin	1261–1300	39	1287–1300	13
Maha Yazawin	1254–1301	47	1286–1300	14
Yazawin Thit and Hmannan Yazawin	1259–1298	39	1286–1298	12

== Reign ==
Kyawswa was the governor of Dala (modern Twante) in 1285 when his father King Narathihapate fled to Lower Burma from an impending Mongol invasion. But in 1287, the king was assassinated by his second son Thihathu, Viceroy of Prome. Thihathu also killed his eldest brother before he himself was accidentally killed.

=== Ruler of Pagan (1289–1297) ===
After the death of Narathihapate, the Pagan Empire collapsed, and a period of interregnum ensued. Kyawswa, who hitherto had been governor of Dala, a key port now part of modern Yangon, won the approval of the powerful dowager queen Pwa Saw. He was anointed king on 30 May 1289. However, the new "king" had little power beyond a few miles outside Pagan. Indeed, the Pagan Empire had ceased to exist and every region of the former kingdom had its own king or pretenders. The Mongols could not hold the searing Irrawaddy valley but stayed up north in Tagaung. In central Burma, Pagan's natural power base, the real power rested with the three brothers who held the main granary of Kyaukse district from their fortified base of Myinsaing. Kyawswa had no choice but to recognize the brothers as lords of Kyaukse district. On 19 February 1293 (12th waxing of Tabaung 654 ME), the nominal king appointed the eldest brother Athinkhaya as viceroy of Myinsaing, the second brother Yazathingyan as viceroy of Mekkara, and the youngest brother Thihathu as viceroy of Pinle. Although the territories were very small, it was the title viceroy that attracted the brothers.

=== Mongol vassal (1297) ===
With the three brothers increasingly acting as sovereign kings, Kyawswa sent his son Theingapati to the Mongols in Tagaung and asked for recognition as their vassal king in January 1297. He received the official recognition and a Chinese title on 20 March 1297. In December, the brothers invited the now puppet king to Myinsaing, their stronghold, to take part in the dedication ceremony of a monastery built by them. The king, with the backing of the Mongols, felt secure and went to Myinsaing. But as soon as the ceremony was over, he was arrested, dethroned, and forced to become a monk in the very monastery he had just dedicated.

== Aftermath ==
After deposing Kyawswa, the brothers went on to found the Kingdom of Myinsaing which covered central Burma along the upper Irrawaddy valley. Saw Hnit, a son of Kyawswa, was elected king by the dowager queen Pwa Saw but soon became a governor under the authority of Myinsaing. The Mongols discovered Kyawswa's dethronement only six months later in June/July 1298. The brothers executed Kyawswa on 10 May 1299. Another of Kyawswa's sons, Kumara Kassapa, escaped to China to seek help in September 1299. The Mongol Emperor declared Kumara Kassapa king of Burma on 22 June 1300, and sent in an army. A Mongol army of 12,000 invaded central Burma in January 1301, reaching the Male fort, north of modern Mandalay on 15 January 1301 and reaching Myinsaing on 25 January 1301. Myinsaing's defenses held. The attacking army was persuaded to retreat with bribes, and the retreat began on 6 April 1301. On 4 April 1303, the Mongols abolished the province of Chiang-Mien based in Tagaung, and withdrew entirely from northern Burma.

== Notes ==
Kyawswa of Pagan Pagan Dynasty Born: 2 August 1260 Died: 10 May 1299
Regnal titles
Preceded by Narathihapate	King of Pagan; 30 May 1289 – 17 December 1297	Succeeded by Saw Hnit
Royal titles
Preceded by	Governor of Dala (Twante) c. 1280–1287	Succeeded by
