= Uzana of Pagan =

Uzana ဥဇနာ
- King Sithu III of Pagan

King of Burma
- Reign: c. May 1251– May 1256
- Predecessor: Kyaswa
- Successor: Narathihapate
- Chief Minister: Yazathingyan
- Born: 23 February 1213; Saturday, 3rd waxing of Late Tagu 574 ME; Pagan (Bagan)
- Died: before 6 May 1256 (aged 43) before Saturday, 12th waxing of Nayon 618 ME; Dala
- Burial: Pagan
- Consort: Thonlula
- Issue: Thihathu; Narathihapate
Regnal name
- Śrī Tribhuvanāditya Dhammarājajayasūra
- House: Pagan
- Father: Kyaswa (or Naratheinga Uzana) (Note: Chronicles (Hmannan Vol. 1 2003: 334) say that he was a son of Kyaswa. But (Than Tun 1964: 134) citing inscriptional evidence says that Uzana was a son of Naratheinga Uzana, by his second wife Hpwa Saw. Naratheinga was an elder brother of Kyaswa.)
- Mother: Saw Min Waing
- Religion: Theravada Buddhism

Uzana (Burmese: ဥဇနာ, pronounced [ʔṵzənà]; also known as Sithu III; 1213–1256) was king of Pagan dynasty of Burma (Myanmar) from 1251 to 1256. He assumed the regnal name "Śrī Tribhuvanāditya Dhammarājajayasūra" (ၐြီတြိဘုဝနာဒိတျဓမ္မရာဇဇယသူရ).

Although his actual reign lasted only five years, Uzana was essentially the power behind the throne during his predecessor Kyaswa's reign, 1235–1251. Kyaswa, a devout Buddhist and scholar, had given Uzana full royal authority to govern the kingdom to the business of governing the country. However Uzana reportedly cared more about chasing elephants, and drinking liquor than governing during his father's or his reign. As king, he left the task of governing to his chief minister Yazathingyan. The king was accidentally killed at Dala (modern Twante) in May 1256 while hunting elephants.

His death was followed by a brief power struggle for the throne. His eldest son, Thihathu, claimed the throne but was pushed aside by the court led by Yazathingyan, who placed the other son by a concubine, Narathihapate, on the throne by November 1256.

== Dates ==
The table below lists the dates given by the four main chronicles.

Chronicles	Birth–Death	Age	Reign	Length of reign
Zatadawbon Yazawin (List of monarchs section)	1214–1254	40	1249–1254	5
Zatadawbon Yazawin (Royal horoscopes section)	23 February 1213 – 1254	41	1251–1254	3
Maha Yazawin	1216–1240	38	1234–1240	6
Yazawin Thit and Hmannan Yazawin	1218–1255	37	1250–1255	5

According to inscriptional evidence, he died a few days before 6 May 1256 when the Pagan selected his younger son by a concubine Narathihapate as the next king. (Note: It would have taken at least a couple of days for the news of the king's death in Dala (modern Yangon) to reach Pagan (515 km north).)

== Bibliography ==
- Coedès, George (1968). Walter F. Vella (ed.). The Indianized States of Southeast Asia. trans.Susan Brown Cowing. University of Hawaii Press. ISBN 978-0-8248-0368-1.
- Harvey, G. E. (1925). History of Burma: From the Earliest Times to 10 March 1824. London: Frank Cass & Co. Ltd.
- Htin Aung, Maung (1967). A History of Burma. New York and London: Cambridge University Press.
- Kala, U (2006) [1724]. Maha Yazawin (in Burmese). Vol. 1–3 (4th printing ed.). Yangon: Ya-Pyei Publishing.
- Maha Sithu (2012) [1798]. Kyaw Win; Thein Hlaing (eds.). Yazawin Thit (in Burmese). Vol. 1–3 (2nd ed.). Yangon: Ya-Pyei Publishing.
- Pe Maung Tin; Luce, G.H. (1923). The Glass Palace Chronicle of the Kings of Burma (1960 ed.). Rangoon University Press.
- Royal Historians of Burma (1960) [c. 1680]. U Hla Tin (Hla Thamein) (ed.). Zatadawbon Yazawin (in Burmese). Historical Research Directorate of the Union of Burma.
- Royal Historical Commission of Burma (2003) [1832]. Hmannan Yazawin (in Burmese). Vol. 1–3. Yangon: Ministry of Information, Myanmar.
- Than Tun (1964). Studies in Burmese History (in Burmese). Vol. 1. Yangon: Maha Dagon.

Uzana of Pagan Pagan Dynasty Born: 23 February 1213 Died: c. 6 May 1256
Regnal titles
Preceded by Kyaswa	King of Burma; 1251–1256	Succeeded by Narathihapate
Royal titles
Preceded by Kyaswa	Heir to the Burmese Throne; 1235–1251	Succeeded by Thihathu
