= Narathihapate =

Narathihapate နရသီဟပတေ့
- King Sithu IV of Pagan

King of Burma
- Reign: 6 May 1256 – 1 July 1287
- Coronation: November 1256
- Predecessor: Uzana
- Successor: Kyawswa (as Viceroy)
- Chief Minister: Yazathingyan (1256–57, 1258–60); Ananda Pyissi (c. 1271–87)
- Born: 23 April 1238; Friday, 9th waxing of Kason 600 ME; Pagan (Bagan)
- Died: 1 July 1287 (aged 49); Tuesday, 5th waning of Waso 649 ME; Prome (Pyay)
- Consort: Yadanabon (1256–62); Saw Hla Wun; Saw Nan; Shin Hpa; Shin Mauk; Shin Shwe; Saw Lon
- Issue: Yazathu; Uzana; Pwa Saw Shin; Thihathu; Kyawswa; Mi Saw U Sithu
Regnal name
- Śrī Tribhuvanādityapavara Dhammarāja
- House: Pagan
- Father: Uzana
- Mother: Su Le Htone
- Religion: Theravada Buddhism

Narathihapate (Burmese: နရသီဟပတေ့, pronounced [nəɹa̰ θìha̰pətḛ]; also Sithu IV of Pagan; 23 April 1238 – 1 July 1287) was the last king of the Pagan Empire who reigned from 1256 to 1287. The king is known in Burmese history as the "Taruk-Pyay Min" ("the King who fled from the Taruk") for his flight from Pagan (Bagan) to Lower Myanmar in 1285 during the first Mongol invasion (1277–87) of the kingdom. He eventually submitted to Kublai Khan, founder of the Yuan dynasty in January 1287 in exchange for a Mongol withdrawal from northern Myanmar. But when the king was assassinated six months later by his son Thihathu, the Viceroy of Prome, the 250-year-old Pagan Empire broke apart into multiple petty states. The political fragmentation of the Irrawaddy valley and its periphery would last for another 250 years until the mid-16th century.

The king is unkindly remembered in the royal chronicles, which in addition to calling a cowardly king who fled from the invaders, also call him "an ogre" and "glutton" who was "great in wrath, haughtiness and envy, exceeding covetous and ambitious." According to scholarship, he was certainly an ineffective ruler but unfairly scapegoated by the chronicles for the fall of the empire, whose decline predated his reign, and in fact had been "more prolonged and agonized".

== Early life ==
The future king was born to Crown Prince Uzana and a commoner concubine from Myittha on 23 April 1238. For much of his early years, he was known at the palace as Min Khwe-Chi (lit. "Prince Dog's Dung") as a harmless royal. Even when his father became king in 1251, Khwe-Chi was not in line for the throne; the position belonged to his half-brother Thihathu, the eldest son of the chief queen Thonlula.

== Reign ==
=== Rise to power ===
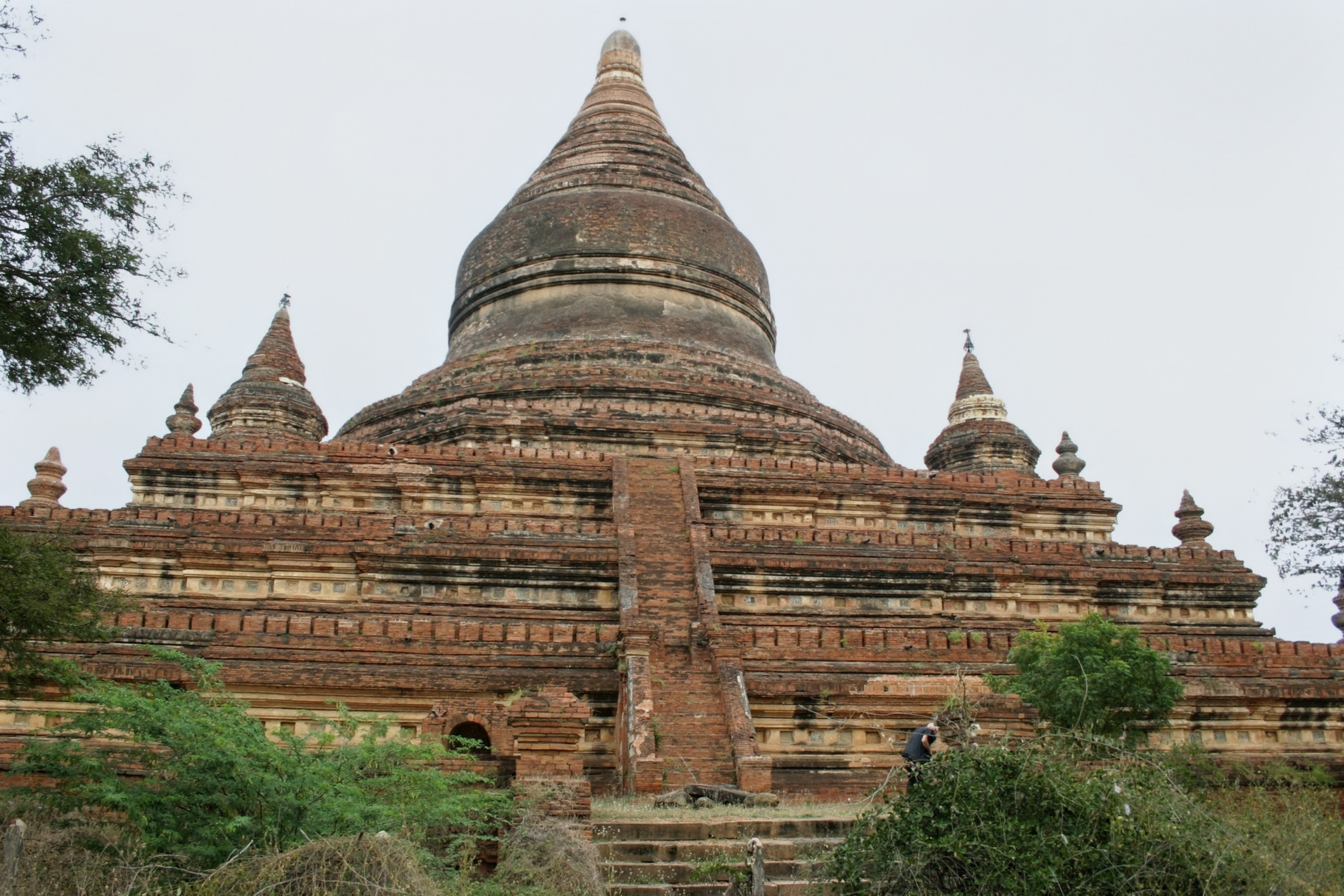
The Mingalazedi Pagoda built by Narathihapate

But fate came calling. In early May 1256, Uzana died from a hunting accident, and Thihathu claimed the throne. The court led by the powerful chief minister Yazathingyan did not accept a head-strong Thihathu, and placed their preferred candidate, Khwe Chi, whom they believed they could control, on the throne on 6 May 1256. Thihathu was arrested and executed. Narathihapate held the coronation ceremony in November 1256. He assumed the regnal name "Śrī Tribhuvanādityapavara Dhammarāja" (ၐြီတြိဘုဝနာဒိတျပဝရဓမ္မရာဇ).

=== Governing style ===
The young king turned out be quick-tempered, arrogant, and ruthless. Soon after his accession, he sent Yazathingyan, the man who put him on the throne, into exile. But he soon had to recall Yazathingyan to quell the rebellions in Martaban (Mottama) (1258–1259) and Arakan (1258–1260). (Note: The Maha Yazawin chronicle (Kala Vol. 1 2006: 238–240) says the king, having reigned for two years, sent two armies to both fronts on Thursday, 6th waxing of Pyatho 604 ME, which translates to Monday, 29 December 1242. But since the king actually came to power only in 1256, the date should be Thursday, 9th waxing of Pyatho 620 ME, which translates to Thursday, 5 December 1258. The chronicle continues that he had to send another expedition the following year on Thursday, 10th waxing of Natdaw 605 ME (Wednesday, 23 November 1243), which should be Thursday, 10th waxing of Natdaw 621 ME (Thursday, 25 December 1259).) Yazathingyan put down the rebellions but died on the return journey. With the old minister's death removed the only person that could have controlled the ruthless, inexperienced king.

Narathihapate was incompetent in both domestic and foreign affairs. Like his father and grandfather before him, he too failed to fix the depleted royal treasury, which had been deteriorating for years because the continued growth of tax-free religious landholdings. But unlike his grandfather Kyaswa, who would rather build a small temple than to resort to forced labor, Narathihapate built a lavish temple, the Mingalazedi Pagoda with forced labor. The people, sinking under his rule, whispered: "When the pagoda is finished, the king shall die".

== Mongol invasions ==
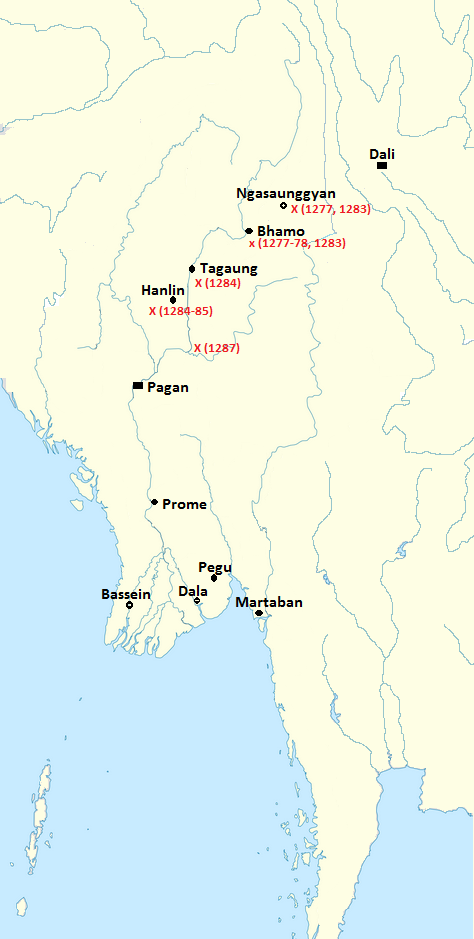
Mongol invasions 1277–87

=== Border war (1277–78) ===
The existential threat to the Burmese kingdom came from the north. The Mongols, who conquered the Dali Kingdom (later renamed as Yunnan in 1274) in 1253–57, first demanded tribute from Pagan in 1271–72. When the Burmese king refused, Emperor Kublai Khan himself sent a mission in 1273 to demand tribute once again. The king refused again. The Mongol army of the Yuan dynasty in 1275–76 consolidated the Pagan–Yunnan borderlands as part of their drive to close off escape routes of the Song refugees, and in the process went on to occupy a Burmese vassal state in present-day Dehong Prefecture). Narathihapate sent the army to reclaim the region but the army was driven back in April 1277 at the battle of Ngasaunggyan (modern Yingjiang). The Mongol troops reached as far south as Kaungsin, which guarded the Bhamo Pass, the gateway into the Irrawaddy, before retreating in 1278 due to excessive heat. Later in 1278, the army reestablished its forts at Kaungsin and Ngasaunggyan.

=== Invasion (1283–85) ===
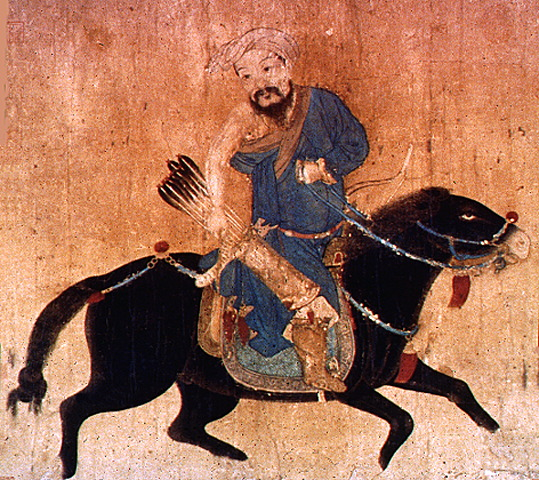
Mongol mounted archers overcame Burmese elephant corps

Narathihapate's troubles were not over. In 1281, the Mongol emperor again demanded tribute. When the king refused, the emperor ordered an invasion of northern Burma. In September 1283, the Mongol forces again attacked the Burmese fort at Ngasaunggyan, which fell on 3 December 1283. Kaungsin fell six days later, and the Mongols took Tagaung on 5 February 1284. But the Mongols found the heat excessive and retreated from Tagaung. The Burmese forces retook Tagaung on 10 May 1284. The Mongol resumed their drive southward in the following dry season (1284–85), and reached as far south as Hanlin by February 1285. Although the Mongols did not have the order to attack Pagan, the king nonetheless fled south to Lower Burma.

=== Exile in Lower Burma (1285–87) ===
At Lower Burma, Narathihapate found himself isolated. Although his three sons controlled three key ports (Bassein (Pathein), Dala and Prome (Pyay)) there, he could not gain their support. He did not trust them in any case, and settled at Hlegya, west of Prome, at the border between Central Burma and Lower Burma. The presence of the king and his small army impressed no one. Pegu (Bago) revolted soon after, and drove back the king's small army twice. With Martaban (Mottama) also in rebellion, the breakaway of Pegu meant the entire eastern half of Lower Burma was now in revolt. His three sons remained in control of the western half of Lower Burma but he could not count on them for their support. At Hlegya, the king was literally at the periphery of Lower Burma.

=== Mongol vassal (1287) ===
He decided to return to central Burma even if it meant making peace with the Mongols. In December 1285, he sent the chief minister and general Ananda Pyissi and Gen. Maha Bo to negotiate a ceasefire. The Mongol commanders at Hanlin, who had organized northern Burma as a protectorate named Zhengmian (Chinese: 征緬; Wade–Giles: Cheng-Mien) agreed to a ceasefire but insisted on a full submission. They repeated their 1281 demand that the Burmese king send a formal delegation to the emperor. A tentative agreement was reached among the negotiators on 3 March 1286; Central Burma would now be organized as a sub-province of Mianzhong (Chinese: 緬中; Wade–Giles: Mien-Chung), and the Burmese king would send a formal embassy to the emperor. After a long deliberation, in June 1286, the Burmese king decided to agree to the terms, and sent an embassy led by Shin Ditha Pamauk, the chief primate, to the emperor's court.

In January 1287, the embassy arrived at Beijing, and was received by the emperor. The Burmese delegation formally acknowledged Mongol suzerainty of their kingdom, and agreed to pay annual tribute tied to the agricultural output of the country. Northern Burma would continue to be organized as Zhengmian (Cheng-Mien) while central Burma would be organized as Mianzhong (Mien-Chung). In exchange, the emperor agreed to withdraw his troops. The Burmese embassy arrived back at Hlegya in May 1287, and reported the terms to the king.

== Death ==
About a month later, the king and his small retinue left Hlegya for Pagan. But he was captured en route by his son Thihathu, the Viceroy of Prome. On 1 July 1287, the king was forced to take poison. To refuse would have meant death by the sword, and with a prayer on his lips that in all his future existences "may no male-child be ever born to him again", the king swallowed the poison and died.

== Aftermath ==
Narathihapate's death was promptly followed by the breakup of the kingdom. Nearly 250 years of Pagan's rule over the Irrawaddy basin and its periphery was over. In Lower Burma, the Hanthawaddy kingdom of the Mons emerged in 1287. (Note: Per scholarship (Yazawin Thit Vol. 1 2012: 148, footnote 8): Thursday, Full moon of Tabodwe 648 ME = 30 January 1287) In the west, Arakan was now de jure independent. In the north, the Shans who came down with the Mongols came to dominate Kachin hills and Shan hills, and went on dominate much of western and central mainland Southeast Asia.

The Mongols deemed the treaty void and invaded south toward Pagan. But the invaders suffered heavy casualties, and retreated back to Tagaung. It would be nearly two years until 30 May 1289 when one of his sons Kyawswa emerged as the king of Pagan. By then, the Pagan Empire had ceased to exist. The Mongols had occupied down to Tagaung, and the occupation would last until April 1303. Even in central Burma, Kyawswa controlled only around the capital. The real power now rested with the three brothers from Myinsaing who would later found the Myinsaing Kingdom in 1297, replacing over four centuries of Pagan Kingdom.

== Legacy ==
The king is unkindly remembered in Burmese history as the "Taruk-Pyay Min" ("the King who Fled from the Taruk [Chinese]") for his flight to the south, instead of defending the country. The royal chronicles paint an especially harsh description of the king, portraying him as "an ogre" and "glutton" who was "great in wrath, haughtiness and envy, exceeding covetous and ambitious." According to scholarship, he was certainly an ineffective ruler but unfairly scapegoated by the chronicles for the fall of the empire, whose descent predated his reign and in fact had been "more prolonged and agonized." As per historical records, it is documented that King Narathihapate was about to take a meal, he satisfied only when there were three hundred dishes. This characteristic earned him a reputation as a notorious king among the rulers of Pagan.

== Historiography ==
Various royal chronicles report different dates about his life.

Birth, death and regnal dates reported in the main royal chronicles and by scholarship
Source	Birth–Death	Age	Reign	Length of reign
Zatadawbon Yazawin (List of monarchs section)	c. 1239–1287/88	48 (49th year)	1254/55–1287/88	33
Zatadawbon Yazawin (Royal horoscopes section)	3 May 1238 – 1286/87 (Note: (Zata 1960: 68): Monday, 17th nekkhat (19th day) of the second month (Kason) of 600 ME = Monday, 3 May 1238)	48 (49th year)	1254/55–1286/87 [sic]	33 [sic]
Maha Yazawin	c. 1225–1284/85	59 (60th year)	1240/41–1284/85	44
Yazawin Thit	c. 1240–1286/87	46 (47th year)	1255/56–1286/87	31
Hmannan Yazawin	c. 1240–December 1286/January 1287	50 (51st year) [sic]	1255/56–December 1286/January 1287	35 [sic] (Note: Hmannan's reporting of the king's birth and death dates is inconsistent. (Hmannan Vol. 1 2003: 338, 358) says he came to power in 617 ME (28 March 1255 to 26 March 1256 CE) at age 15 (16th year). It means he was born in 602 ME (27 March 1240 to 26 March 1241), two years later than the actual inscription given birth date of 23 April 1238. However, (Hmannan Vol. 1 2003: 358) says he died at age 50 (51st year), having reigned for 35 years, meaning he was born in 602 ME and died in 652 ME (28 March 1290 to 27 March 1291). Yet in the next page (Hmannan Vol. 1 2003: 359), Kyawswa ascended the throne in 648 ME (28 March 1286 to 27 March 1287), which was the same date reported by Maha Yazawin (Maha Yazawin Vol. 1 2006: 252). This shows that the chroniclers of Hmannan, who hitherto had followed Yazawin Thit's dates, suddenly switched to Maha Yazawin's dating but failed reconcile Yazawin Thit's dates with Maha Yazawin's. Hmannan should have updated Kyawswa's accession year to 652 ME as well but instead left it at 648 ME.)
Scholarship	23 April 1238 – 1 July 1287	49 (50th year)	6 May 1256 – 1 July 1287	31

== Bibliography ==
- Aung-Thwin, Michael (1985). Pagan: The Origins of Modern Burma. Honolulu: University of Hawai'i Press. ISBN 0-8248-0960-2.
- Aung-Thwin, Michael Arthur; Hall, Kenneth R. (2011). New Perspectives on the History and Historiography of Southeast Asia. Routledge. ISBN 9781136819643.
- Coedès, George (1968). Walter F. Vella (ed.). The Indianized States of Southeast Asia. trans. Susan Brown Cowing. University of Hawaii Press. ISBN 978-0-8248-0368-1.
- Harvey, G. E. (1925). History of Burma: From the Earliest Times to 10 March 1824. London: Frank Cass & Co. Ltd.
- Htin Aung, Maung (1967). A History of Burma. New York and London: Cambridge University Press.
- Kala, U (1724). Maha Yazawin (in Burmese). Vol. 1–3 (2006, 4th printing ed.). Yangon: Ya-Pyei Publishing.
- Lieberman, Victor B. (2003). Strange Parallels: Southeast Asia in Global Context, c. 800–1830, volume 1, Integration on the Mainland. Cambridge University Press. ISBN 978-0-521-80496-7.
- Maha Sithu (2012) [1798]. Kyaw Win; Thein Hlaing (eds.). Yazawin Thit (in Burmese). Vol. 1–3 (2nd ed.). Yangon: Ya-Pyei Publishing.
- Pan Hla, Nai (1968). Razadarit Ayedawbon (in Burmese) (8th printing, 2004 ed.). Yangon: Armanthit Sarpay.
- Pe, Maung Tin; Luce, G.H. The Glass Palace Chronicle of the Kings of Burma (1960 ed.). Rangoon University Press.
- Royal Historical Commission of Burma (1832). Hmannan Yazawin (in Burmese). Vol. 1–3 (2003 ed.). Yangon: Ministry of Information, Myanmar.
- Sarpay Beikman, ed. (1961). Myanma Swezon Kyan (in Burmese). Vol. 5 (1 ed.). Heartford, Heartfordshire: Stephen Austin & Sons, Ltd.
- Stuart-Fox, Martin (2001). "Review of "Myth and History in the Historiography of Early Burma" by Michael A. Aung-Thwin". Journal of the Economic and Social History of the Orient. 44 (1). Brill: 88–90. JSTOR 3632565.
- Than Tun (1964). Studies in Burmese History (in Burmese). Vol. 1. Yangon: Maha Dagon.
- Wade, Geoff (2009). Eugene Perry Link (ed.). The Scholar's Mind: Essays in Honor of Frederick W. Mote. Chinese University Press. ISBN 9789629964030.

== External sources ==
1. Pagan Period (Part One)
2. Pagan Period (Part Two)

Narathihapate Pagan Dynasty Born: 23 April 1238 Died: 1 July 1287
Regnal titles
Preceded by Uzana	King of Burma; 6 May 1256 – 1 July 1287	Succeeded by Kyawswa as King of Pagan
