= Nayon =

Third month of the Burmese calendar

Nayon (Burmese: နယုန်; Mon: ဇှ်ေ) is the third month of the traditional Burmese calendar.

== Festivals and observances ==
- Tipitaka Festival (စာပြန်ပွဲတော်) – national Pariyatti Sasana examinations for Buddhist monks
- Mahasamaya Day (မဟာသမယနေ့) – full moon of Nayon

== Nayon symbols ==
- Flower: Jasmine

== See also ==
- Festivals of Burma
