= Ba Shin =

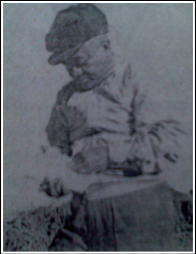
BaShin

U Ba Shin (born in 1914 in Ywarkauk, Pyinmana) is a colonel and noted historian and was a member of The Myanmar History Commission and Islamic Religious Affairs Council.

== Family ==
Ba Shin's parents were Principal U Hein and Daw Saw Yin. His wife Daw Khin May Gyi is a Lecturer at the Zoology Department (now retired), Yangon University. He received the Bachelor of Arts (Honours) class degree, specializing in Inscription and Oriental History from Yangon University.

== Career ==
=== Education ===
From 1935-40, he worked under Professor Gordon H Luce at the Rangoon University Eastern and Burmese History Division. He carried out research in China – Myanmar relations of the Middle period and the history of Chinese – Myanmar inscriptions. He was promoted to an Assistant Lecturer in that department in 1940.

=== Military ===
During the Japanese occupation, Ba Shin was the Academic Officer in the Asian Youth Organization. He also worked as the Education Officer of the Burma Defense Army. Later, he became a Lt. Col. in the Military Division (4) of the Burma Army. He published "Tine 4" (Fourth Military Division) newspaper and wrote a book for the soldiers called European Economic History, explaining the emergence of Capitalism.

He wrote a Burmese history book for the Army that was published on 4 January 1948, Burma's Independence day. The Education Ministry prescribed that book as a high school textbook. While serving in military, he wrote military, cultural and history articles in Sit Nha Lone (Military Heart) journal and Myawaddy journals. He also wrote articles for children in Kha Lae (Children) journal and Light of Myanmar newspapers. He wrote military articles in Military Education journal. He worked in the Myanmar Army until 1956.

=== Post WW2 ===
After the war, he worked in the War Office as commanding officer of Records Office, Burma Army. He was later appointed the Burmese Military Attaché to London, UK where he also met with international researchers and historians.

== Research works ==
In 1957, Ba Shin joined the Burma Historical Commission as a Compiler. He wrote many English and Myanmar research papers in Bulletin of the Burma Historical Commission and many articles about racial and ethnic groups of Myanmar were written for the Myanmar Encyclopaedia. He wrote Lawkatheikpan in English and Myanmar before Anawrahta. One of his duties was to do detailed studies and research about Burmese history from AD 1300-1752.

He worked with Professor Luce for quite a long time in Bagan at Myin Kabar Gu-pyauk Pagoda, built by Raja Kumar (Yazakumar, son of Kyansittha) in AD 1113. Their research paper was published in Burmese History Commission Journal volume 2 in 1961 from page 227-416. Not only the background history of the pagoda, but the architecture, Buddhist scriptures and all the stone inscriptions with the translations were included in the article. A complete comparison of the various Buddhist scriptures found in ancient Bagan was included. Studies of ancient Mon and Austro Asian languages and Mon grammar and spellings were mentioned.

He was an important person in the team, which had done comparative studies of Sanskrit, Pali and ancient Mon. Professor Luce praised Major Ba Shin for his contribution of invaluable edits to his thirty years of research. Luce even commented that Ba Shin had even corrected his overlooked mistakes.

In an article written to honour Ba Shin in relation to the Wetkyi Inn and Gu-pyauk Pagodas in Bagan, Professor Luce wrote, "He is one of the best researchers, expert in History and Stone Inscription."

One of Ba Shin’s best efforts was seen in the article about Bagan Pagoda Lawka Hteit Pan (Rangoon, 1962) which indicated the ancient Burmese civilization. Nai Min Nai had written an article together with A.B. Grisworld about the comments and review in Artibus Asiae volume 33, page 228-233.

He was the editor of the article “Essays offered to G.H.Luce by his colleagues and friends in Honour of his Seventy-Fifth Birthday“ in two volumes, Artibus Asiae supplementum XXIII, Ascona, Switzerland, 1956. He wrote the "Buddha Images of Tai Yuan Types Found in Burma" in that publication.

He wrote about the Ink duplicate copies of ancient Bagan stone inscriptions in the Bagan Ink duplicate copy research journey report book. Both were published by the Burmese History Commission.

He was an active member of the Myanmar Orthography (Spelling) Commission. He helped and acted as advisor to final year history students and History Master students’ research papers.

== Journalist ==
Since he was in the university, he was active in journalism. He was the Yudathan (Judson) College reporter of Myanmar Alin (Light of Myanmar) and Thuraya (The Sun) newspapers.

He wrote a book, Khit Thit Marga (Modern Tha Gyar Min or Sakya) in 1937 about the rebuilding of rural villages.

He wrote in the Yudathan (Judson) College magazine and was the Burmese section editor. He was the editor of the Mosquito hand written magazine.

In 1939, he wrote an article about the modernization of Burmese rural villages together with Dr Thar Saing and Dr Andrab.

His pennames were (1) San Aung, (2) Thutethi, (3) Bohmu Nyanna, (4) Taing Lay Yebawhaung, (5) Lt. Colonel Ba Shin, (6) U Ba Shin, (7) Wari San, (8) Maung Pinti, (9) Scott Boy and, (10) Bo Mhu.

He wrote articles in the Pyannya Padethar journal published by the Directorate of University Education. He also wrote research papers and articles in the magazines published by Rangoon Arts and Science University, University Burmese literature magazine, Zoology magazine, Burmese Muslim University Students’ magazines, Ngwe Taryi magazine, Pyinyar Tazaung magazine, Working peoples’ daily (English and Burmese).

Early Myanmar History was the last article he was still writing for the Myanmar History Commission. The last article he finished was Myanmar before Anawrattha, published in sections, in the Pyannar Tazaung magazine from June to November 1968. However, he could not finish the second part of that book, Bagan era Myanmar book.

As a Muslim, he served as the Secretary General in the Myanmar Islamic Religious Affairs Council until his death on 7 January 1970, at 5.50 p.m. of heart disease.

== Religion and languages ==
Ba Shin was a Burmese Muslim. He could speak all the languages of Myanmar ethnic minorities. He could also speak Mon Khmar, Tibet Bama, Thai, Chinese and many dialects of Indian language. He could even understand the ancient Burmese and ancient Mon languages. Although he was a Muslim, he was fluent in Pali language and especially Buddhist literatures written in Pali.

== Publications ==
U Ba Shin (1962). The Lokahteikpan. Rangoon: Burma Historical Commission, Ministry of Union Culture, Revolutionary Govt., Union of Burma.

== See also ==
- Famous Burmese Muslims
- Islam in Myanmar
- Rohingya People
- Burmese Chinese
- Panthay
- Burmese Indians
