= Htin Aung =

Dr. Sithu Htin Aung
- ထင်အောင်
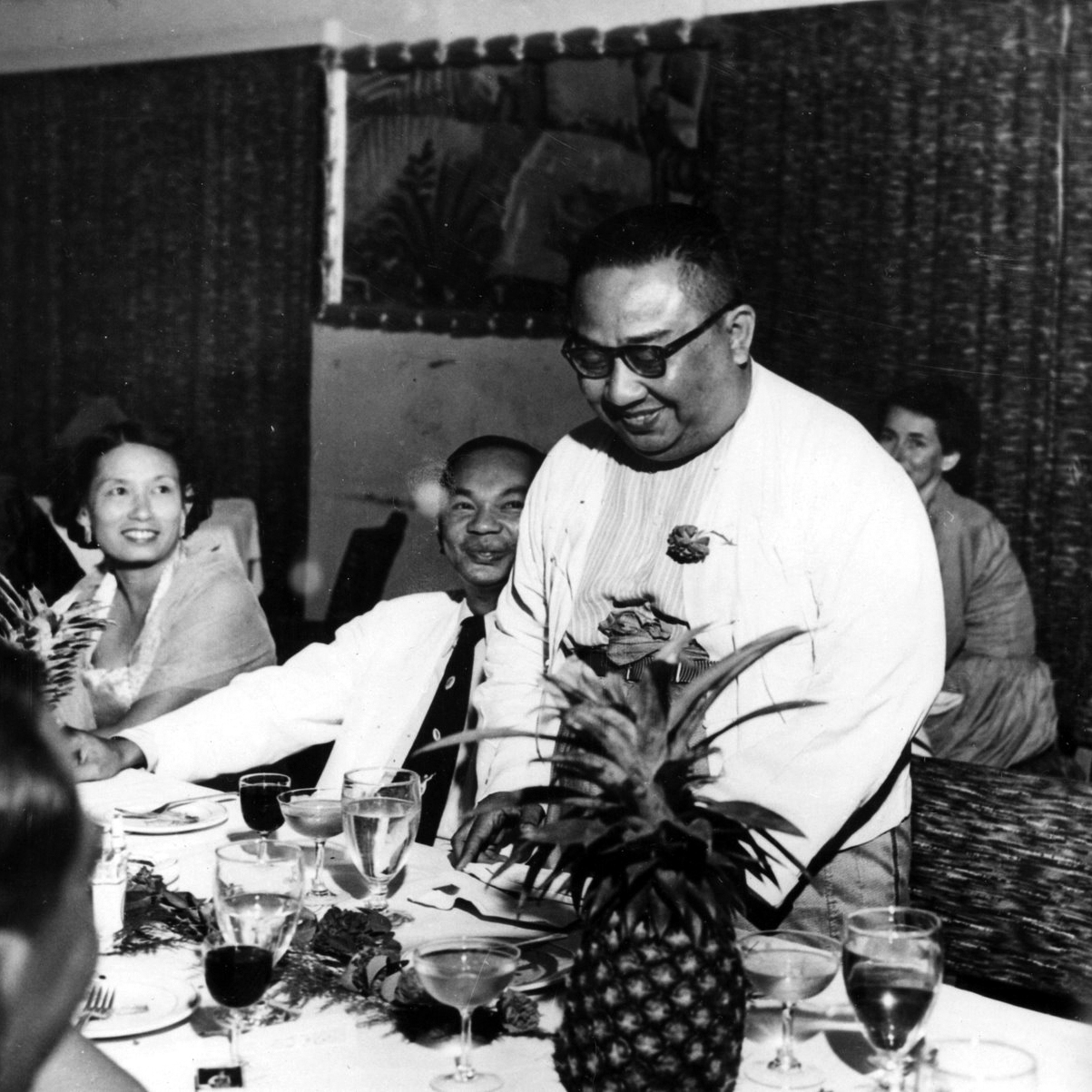
- Htin Aung

Burmese Ambassador to Sri Lanka
- In office 1959–1962
- President: Win Maung
- Prime Minister: Ne Win (1959–1960); U Nu (1960–1962)

Vice-Chancellor of University of Rangoon
- In office 1959–1959

Rector of University of Rangoon
- In office 1946–1958
- Preceded by: office created
- Succeeded by: Hla Myint

Personal details
- Born: 18 May 1909 Rangoon, British Burma
- Died: 10 May 1978 (aged 68) Rangoon, Burma (Myanmar)
- Citizenship: Burmese
- Relations: Tin Tut, Myint Thein and Kyaw Myint
- Parents: U Hpein (father); Daw Mi Mi (mother)
- Education: University of Cambridge; University of Oxford; University of London; University of Dublin
- Degrees: MA, LL.B., PhD, LLD, D.Litt. Barrister-at-law
- Fields: Burmese history and culture

Htin Aung (Burmese: ထင်အောင် [tʰɪ̀ɰ̃ àʊɰ̃]; also Maung Htin Aung; 18 May 1909 – 10 May 1978) was a writer and scholar of Burmese culture and history. Educated at Oxford and Cambridge, Htin Aung wrote several books on Burmese history and culture in both Burmese and English. His English-language works brought a much-needed Burmese perspective to the international study of Burmese history, previously written by British historians of the colonial era. His important works include A History of Burma, Folk Elements in Burmese Buddhism, Selections from Burmese Folk Tales, Thirty Burmese Tales and Burmese Drama.

Htin Aung, as the rector of the University of Rangoon from 1946 to 1958, was the highest ranking academic in the Burmese education system, at the time. He was one of the founding fathers of the Association of Southeast Asian Institutions of Higher Learning (ASAIHL).

== Early life and education ==
Htin Aung was born to a Burmese aristocratic family on 18 May 1909. His parents were U Hpein and Daw Mi Mi. He was a great-great-grandson of Maha Minhla Mindin Raza, a military officer in the Konbaung court, who fought in the First Anglo-Burmese War. He had six other siblings. He was the youngest of four brothers, including Tin Tut, Myint Thein and Kyaw Myint.

Htin Aung graduated from Yangon's elite St. Paul's English High School. After leaving the University of Rangoon with an Honours BA Degree with the distinction of the University Gold medal, he went on to receive a Bachelor of Laws from Cambridge University, a Bachelor in Civil Law from Oxford University, a Master of Laws from the University of London, and doctorates in Anthropology and Literature from Trinity College, Dublin. He was also called to the English bar by Lincoln's Inn, London.

== Career ==
Htin Aung was the Rector of Rangoon University (Yangon University) from 1946 to 1958 and Vice-Chancellor in 1959. He was appointed Ambassador to Sri Lanka from 1959 to 1962. He later became a visiting professor at Columbia University and then at Wake Forest University.

== List of works ==
Htin Aung authored many important books on Myanmar, under the pen name of Maung Htin Aung. His books are widely used in the study of the comparatively under-documented history and culture of Myanmar.

1. Burmese Drama (Oxford University Press, 1937)
2. Burmese Folk-Tales (Oxford University Press, 1948)
3. Burmese Drama: A study, with translations, of Burmese plays (Oxford University Press, 1956)
4. Burmese Law Tales (Oxford University Press, 1962)
5. Folk Elements in Burmese Buddhism (Oxford University Press, 1962).
6. The Stricken Peacock: An Account of Anglo-Burmese Relations 1752–1948 (Martinus Nijhoff, 1965)
7. Burmese Monk's Tales (Columbia University Press, 1966)
8. Epistles Written on Eve of Anglo-Burmese War (Martinus Nijhoff, 1967)
9. A History of Burma (Columbia University Press, 1967)
10. Lord Randolph Churchill and the dancing peacock : British conquest of Burma 1885
11. Burmese history before 1287: A Defence of the Chronicles (1970).
12. Folk Tales of Burma (Sterling Publishers, 1976)

== Bibliography ==
- Htin Aung, Maung (1967). A History of Burma. New York and London: Cambridge University Press.
- Htin Aung, Maung (1970). Burmese History before 1287: A Defence of the Chronicles. Oxford: The Asoka Society.
- International Who's Who: 1964 (28 ed.). Europa Publications Limited. 1964.
- Maung Maung (2008). Robert H. Taylor (ed.). Dr. Maung Maung: Gentleman, Scholar, Patriot. Singapore: Institute of Southeast Asian Studies. ISBN 9789812304094.
- "Rotarian Honors". The Rotarian. 87 (5). Rotary International: 68. November 1955. ISSN 0035-838X.
