= Than Tun =

Burmese historian

- သန်းထွန်း
- Born: 6 April 1923; Daunggyi Village; Irrawaddy Division, British Burma
- Died: 30 November 2005 (aged 82); Mandalay, Burma (Myanmar)
- Spouse: Khin Yi
- Awards: Fukuoka Prize (2000)

Academic background
- Education: University of Rangoon; University of London
- Thesis: History of Buddhism in Burma A.D. 1000–1300 (1956)
- Influences: G.H. Luce

Academic work
- Discipline: Burmese history
- Institutions: University of Mandalay

Than Tun (Burmese: သန်းထွန်း, pronounced [θáɰ̃ tʰʊ́ɰ̃]; 6 April 1923 – 30 November 2005) was an influential Burmese historian as well as an outspoken critic of the military junta of Burma. For his lifelong contributions to the development of worldwide study of Burmese history and culture, Professor Than Tun was awarded the Fukuoka Asian Culture Prize in 2000.

== Early life and education ==
Than Tun was born in Daunggyi village, Ngathaingchaung Subtownship, Irrawaddy Division to Bo Htwe and Daw Tin and completed his high school in 1938 in Ngathaingchaung. Than Tun entered Rangoon University in 1939, and received bachelor's degrees in history and law in 1946 and 1948, respectively and an MA in history in 1950. During the Second World War's Japanese invasion of Burma, he studied astrology in Ngathainchaung and became the chairman of Ngathaingchaung's Anti-Fascist People's Freedom League and got involved with student union organisations. He also got married in 1948 to Khin Yi, also a native of Ngataingchaung Subtownship. In 1956, he received his PhD in history with a paper named "Buddhist Church in Pagan Period" from University of London, School of Oriental and African Studies (SOAS).

== Academic career ==
Dr. Than Tun became a lecturer in University of Rangoon’s Department of History and Political Science in 1948. In 1965, he was promoted to the Professor and Head of Department in History at University of Mandalay. Professor Than Tun left Mandalay in 1982 for University of Kyoto’s Center for South East Asian Studies where he was a Research Fellow and Visiting Professor from 1982 to 1987. Later, he was a visiting professor in Northern Illinois University where he was awarded an Honorary Doctorate of Literature in 1988. From 1989 to 1990, he was a visiting scholar at the University of Michigan. In 1990 he came back to Burma and worked as a Member of the Myanmar (Burmese) Historical Commission and Emeritus Professor in University of Yangon in the Departments of History and Archeology.

In 2000 Fukuoka Asian Culture prize Committee awarded Professor Than Tun the highest worldwide academic award, a Literate of the 11th Fukuoka Asian Culture Prizes in the Academic Prize Category.

Professor Than Tun was a leading figure in the field of history and as the most prominent scholar of pre-modern history. Among his many significant publications, the most celebrated both at home and abroad are "History of Buddhism in Burma" and "The Medieval Myanmar History", both of which richly employ the epigraphs of the Pagan dynasty from the 11th to the 13th centuries. These books are the fruit of hard work into which the professor put his heart and soul.

Another of his publications, The Royal Orders of Burma, comprises ten volumes and took him eight years to complete. In this study, he compared the existing copies of royal orders from the dynasty period and subjected them to rigorous analysis. This work of 7,600 pages includes an abridged English translation, commentaries, and index, and is the most reliable collection of original historical documents.

== Critic of the military junta ==
Professor Than Tun was also known as a fearlessly outspoken critic of successive military juntas of Burma, and, for not toeing to the official line when it comes to the history of Burma. Than Tun often criticized the generals for attempting to rewrite the history of Burma according to the requirements of their propagandas, and his well-researched books on Burma, had often been banned by the authorities or sidelined by publishers for fear of punishments from the paranoid generals.

Professor Than Tun was very critical of the military junta’s defacing of the ancient Burmese capital the Old Bagan with unnecessary, garish and over-the-top ‘re-innovations’ of its ancient temples, the construction of a motorway among the ruins and the erection of an observation tower for the benefits of dollar yielding tourists. Often irreverent towards the country’s military leadership, he once commented in an interview with The Irrawaddy in 2003 on the generals’ obsession with white elephants as bringers of good fortune that "they are animals, whether they are white or black."

== Death ==
On 30 November 2005, Than Tun died unexpectedly while traveling to a 90th birthday celebration in Mandalay for celebrated Burmese literary figure Ludu Daw Amar. The professor was buried in a cemetery on the outskirts of Amarapura, south of Mandalay, where some 300 people, many of them former students, gathered to mourn his death. He was survived by his wife Khin Yi, and daughter, Mizu Than Tun.

== Legacy ==
The Ludu Library in Mandalay houses a complete collection of Than Tun's works.

== Publications ==
- Than Tun (1985). The Royal Orders of Burma, A.D. 1598–1885. Vol. 2. Kyoto University. hdl:2433/173789.
- Than Tun (2006) [1993]. ပျူတွေဘယ်ပျောက်သွားသလဲ [Where did the Pyu disappear to?]. Yangon: Thiri Swaysar Publishing.
- Than Tun (1964). Studies in Burmese History (in Burmese). Vol. 1. Yangon: Maha Dagon.
- ငါပြောချင်သမျှ ငါ့အကြောင်း ၂၀၀၁ မေ။
- မြန်မာသမိုင်း နိဒါန်း ၂၀၁၀။
- မြန်မာ ထီးမူနန်းယာ ၂၀၀၃ ဇူလိုင်။
