= Yazathingyan of Pagan =

Yazathingyan ရာဇသင်္ကြန်

Chief Minister-General
- In office 1240s–1260
- Monarchs: Kyaswa; Uzana; Narathihapate
- Preceded by: Ananda Thura

Personal details
- Born: 1198/1199 Pagan (Bagan)
- Died: 1260 (aged 61) Dala
- Spouse: Saw Khin Htut
- Children: Ananda Pyissi; Yanda Pyissi; Saw San; Saw Soe

Military service
- Allegiance: Pagan Kingdom
- Branch/service: Royal Burmese Army
- Years of service: 1230s–1260
- Rank: Commander-in-chief
- Battles/wars: Martaban (1258–1259); Missagiri (1259–1260)

Yazathingyan (Burmese: ရာဇသင်္ကြန်, pronounced [jàza̰ θɪ́ɴdʑàɴ]; also spelled Yaza Thingyan or Yazathinkyan; 1198/1199–1260) was the chief minister of kings Kyaswa, Uzana, and Narathihapate of the Pagan dynasty of Burma (Myanmar). He was also the commander-in-chief of the Royal Burmese Army from 1258 until his death in 1260. Ava kings from Swa Saw Ke to Narapati II and all Konbaung kings were descended from him.

== Background ==
He was a descendant of the 11th-century general Nyaung-U Hpi. That he was married to a daughter of King Kyaswa and that he became the chief minister show that he hailed from a (distant) branch of the royal family. (Note: (Hmannan Vol. 1 2003: 360): He was married to Saw Khin Htut, daughter of King Kyaswa by queen Yaza Dewi. Per (Aung-Thwin 1985: 130–131), ministers of the court were usually drawn from more distant branches of the royal family. Their subordinates were not royal but usually hailed from top official families.) He was born c. 1198/99. (Note: Based on his date of death in early 1260 at age 61 (or 62nd year in Burmese age reckoning) per (Hmannan Vol. 1 2003: 344–345).)

== Career ==
=== Reigns of Kyaswa and Uzana ===
He first entered the royal service of King Htilominlo and became a judge before graduating to the royal court as a junior minister. He rose to the rank of chief minister with the title of Yazathingyan by 1248 at King Kyaswa's court. (Note: (Taw, Forchhammer 1899: 114–115): The stone inscription dated Tuesday, 10th waxing of Tazaungmon 610 ME (27 October 1248) at a temple near the Izzagawna monastery lists Kyaswa's ministers, of which the name Yazathingyan comes first.) By then the court ran the country. King Kyaswa, a devout Buddhist and scholar, was interested only in religion and gave up all administrative duties to his heir-apparent Uzana. But Uzana was not interested in governing either; he was reportedly interested only in chasing elephants and drinking liquor. Uzana in turn handed over the administration to the court.

When Kyawswa died and Uzana became king in 1251, nothing changed from the court's perspective. They still ran the country. However, the court, in particular Yazathingyan, came into conflict with Uzana's headstrong son and heir-presumptive Thihathu. Yazathingyan felt slighted by what he considered the young prince's rude and disrespectful behavior toward him—someone several decades older. (According to the chronicles, Yazathingyan was once spat on by the young prince. Chronicles do not say how old Thihathu was but given that Yazathingyan was about 15 years older than Uzana, he was at least three decades older than Thihathu.)

=== Putsch of Thihathu ===
The old minister nursed a grudge against the young prince. His opportunity to repay him came in May 1256 when Uzana died during one of his many elephant hunting trips in the south. Thihathu, the only son of Uzana by a queen, claimed the throne, but the powerful court disagreed. Yazathingyan persuaded the court to back Uzana's only other son by a concubine. The junior prince, known by the nickname of Min Khway-Chi (lit. "Prince Dog Dung"), was seen as harmless, and someone that they could control. The court prevailed in the ensuing power struggle. Thihathu was arrested, and, though the chronicles do not explicitly state it, he was most likely executed. According to inscriptional evidence, Prince Dog Dung was crowned king with the title of Narathihapate in November 1256.

=== Exile in Dala ===
Yazathingyan had badly miscalculated; the 18-year-old new king was not harmless after all. He quickly consolidated power and pushed aside Yazathingyan by exiling him to Dala (modern Yangon). In shock, Yazathingyan asked the king why. The young king famously replied that when the construction of a temple is complete, the scaffold must be removed, and that Yazathingyan was the scaffold which must be removed now that his rise to power was complete.

=== Martaban campaign (1258–59) ===
The king had acted in haste; the vassal rulers did not respect the inexperienced king. The vassal rulers of Martaban (Mottama) and Missagiri (Note: (Harvey 1925: 326–327): Also spelled Macchagiri. Area west of Thayet. An inscription dated 1096 shows that Missagiri was in Arakan. But Harvey believes that it may not have stretched as far west to the Arakan coastline.) both revolted. On the advice of his queen Saw Hla Wun, the king recalled Yazathingyan to Pagan (Bagan). In 1258, he returned to Pagan and organized two expeditions. In December 1258, (Note: Maha Yazawin (Maha Yazawin Vol. 1 2006: 238) says the campaign began two years after the king's accession on Thursday, 6th waxing of Pyatho 604 ME, which translates to Sunday, 28 December 1242. Since Narathihapate came to power in 1256, the more probable date is 6th waxing of Pyatho 620 ME (1 December 1258).) Yazathingyan led an army of 2000 men, 200 horses, and 20 elephants to start the Martaban campaign, while Thray Pyissapate, captain of the Household Guards, led another army to Missagiri. Yazathingyan's army faced little resistance and took the city after a siege of 8 days. The minister appointed Aleimma as the new governor and brought back the rebellious governor Nga Shwe and prisoners of war.

=== Missagiri (1259–60) ===
Meanwhile, the Missagiri campaign had gone badly. The army had been badly defeated there and retreated in disarray. The king sent Yanda Pyissi, the younger son of Yazathingyan, to the front with an order to execute the commander, Thray Pyissapate. Yazathingyan was on his way back to Pagan, intercepted his son en route near Salin, and stopped him from carrying out the order. At Pagan, he presented the king with the rebel lord of Martaban and prisoners of war. When the king was in a better mood, he persuaded the king to rescind the execution order of Pyissapate.

In return, the king asked Yazathingyan to lead the next dry-season campaign to Missagiri. Yazathingyan agreed. In November 1259, (Note: (Maha Yazawin Vol. 1 2006: 240) says the campaign began on Thursday, 10th waxing of Nadaw 605 ME (10 November 1244). Since the king came to power only in 1256, the date should be 10th waxing of Nadaw 621 ME (25 November 1259).) Yazathingyan led an army of 40,000 men to Missagiri. His two sons also joined him. The Pagan armies laid siege to the city until starvation forced them to surrender. Yazathingyan however fell ill on the return trip through the Irrawaddy delta. He was either travelling by sea from Missagiri or settling some delta revolt. He died in Dala. He was 61. The king is said to have been greatly saddened by the news.

== Legacy ==
Yazathingyan had at least four children. Two of the children became generals in the Pagan army with the titles of Ananda Pyissi and Yanda Pyissi. Both brothers had competed to succeed their father's title, Yazathingyan. (Note: Maha Yazawin (Maha Yazawin Vol. 1 2006: 241) says both brothers fought to succeed the title Yazathingyan, and Ananda Pyissi eventually received it. Hmannan Yazawin (Hmannan Vol. 1 2003: 345) only says both brothers fought to succeed the title but omits Ananda Pyissi winning it. The title was eventually given to the man who later became King Yazathingyan of Myinsaing.) The chronicles do not mention the mother of Ananda Pyissi and Yanda Pyissi. He also had at least two younger children named Saw San and Saw Soe by Princess Saw Khin Htut, daughter of King Kyaswa and Queen Yaza Dewi.

His descendants became famous people in Burmese history. His two sons led the Burmese army against the first two Mongol invasions (1277, 1283–84). Saw Soe became a principal queen of King Kyawswa, the successor of Narathihapate. Through Saw Soe, Ava kings from Swa Saw Ke to Thihathu were his descendants. Through Yanda Pyissi, Ava kings from Mohnyin Thado to Narapati II were his descendants. Through Mohnyin Thado, all the king of the Konbaung dynasty were his descendants.

== Bibliography ==
- Aung-Thwin, Michael (1985). Pagan: The Origins of Modern Burma. Honolulu: University of Hawai'i Press. ISBN 0-8248-0960-2.
- Harvey, G. E. (1925). History of Burma: From the Earliest Times to 10 March 1824. London: Frank Cass & Co. Ltd.
- Htin Aung, Maung (1967). A History of Burma. New York and London: Cambridge University Press.
- Kala, U (2006) [1724]. Maha Yazawin (in Burmese). Vol. 1–3 (4th printing ed.). Yangon: Ya-Pyei Publishing.
- Letwe Nawrahta and Twinthin Taikwun (1961) [c. 1770]. Hla Thamein (ed.). Alaungpaya Ayedawbon (in Burmese). Ministry of Culture, Union of Burma.
- Royal Historical Commission of Burma (2003) [1832]. Hmannan Yazawin (in Burmese). Vol. 1–3. Yangon: Ministry of Information, Myanmar.
- Than Tun (1964). Studies in Burmese History (in Burmese). Vol. 1. Yangon: Maha Dagon.
