= Shin Ditha Pamauk =

Burmese diplomat and monk

Shin Ditha Pamauk ရှင်ဒိသာပါမောက်

Personal life
- Born: Thitseingyi
- Died: Pagan (Bagan)?
- Occupation: Buddhist monk

Religious life
- Religion: Buddhism
- School: Theravada
- Dharma name: Disāpāmuk

Senior posting
- Based in: Pagan (Bagan)

The Venerable Shin Ditha Pamauk (Burmese: ရှင်ဒိသာပါမောက်, (Note: (Luce in MSK 1961: 262–263): The modern spelling "Ditha Pamauk" (ဒိသာပါမောက်) is an abbreviated form of "Ditha Pamaukkha" (ဒိသာပါမောက္ခ, [dḭθà pàmauʔkʰa̰]), derived from Pali Disāpāmukkha. However, the Old Burmese spelling given in the contemporary inscriptions was "သျှင်ဒိသာပြမုက်" ([ʃɪ̀ɴ dḭθà pɹàmoʊʔ]), which suggests it was derived from Sanskrit Disāprāmukha. The name means "Presiding Teacher of All Regions".) pronounced [ʃɪ̀ɴ dḭθà pàmauʔ]; also spelled Disapramok) was the Chief Primate of the Pagan Empire during the reign of King Narathihapate (1256–87). The monk led the peace negotiations with the Mongols in 1285–87, culminating in the meeting with Emperor Kublai Khan in 1287.

== Background ==
Little is known about the monk's background except that he was from Thitseingyi (သစ်ဆိမ့်ကြီး) in present-day Shwebo Township. According to one tradition, his personal name was Kyi-Bwei (ကျည်ပွေ့, [tɕì bwḛ]), and he wrote the first known commentary on Burmese grammar and spelling called Pubbaganhta Diga (ပုဗ္ဗဂန္ထဋီကာ, Pali: Pubbaganthaṭīkā), commonly known in Burmese as Thinbongyi Diga (သင်ပုန်းကြီးဋီကာ), for which he was conferred the title "Ditha Pamaukkha" by King Kyaswa (r. 1235–51). Of the main royal chronicles, only Zatadawbon Yazawin mentions Ditha Pamauk by name, saying that the monk was Narathihapate's teacher. It is unclear if he was the same monk who wrote the grammar book, or another monk who succeeded the title. (Note: According to tradition per (Kyi Pe in MSK 1973: 227), Kyi-Bwei had already turned 60 and was illiterate before becoming a monk, and eventually learned enough to write the grammar book. Given that the teacher of Narathihapate undertook an arduous journey to Beijing in 1286–87, he could not have been over 60 years old in the 1240s. To be sure, the tradition's learning after 60 years of age may not be accurate.)

The earliest archaeological evidence about him was a 1278/79 inscription, which refers to him as Yaza Guru (ရာဇဂုရု; IAST: rājaguru; "Royal Teacher"), and states that he had spent two years since 1276/77 in the Minbu region in present-day central Myanmar to ask for land donations there.

== Peace negotiations ==
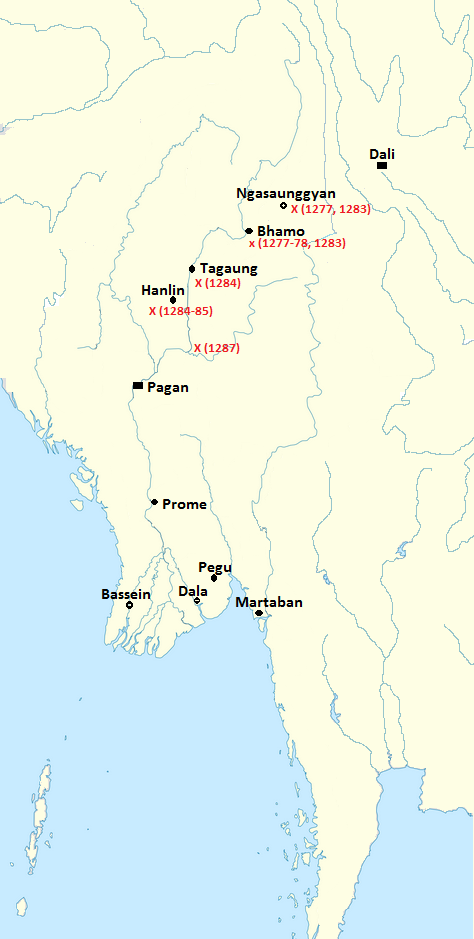
Mongol invasions 1277–87

The monk led the peace negotiations with the Mongol Empire in 1285–87. The Mongols had occupied northern Burma to Tagaung and Hanlin, following their successful dry-season campaigns in 1283–85. The king had fled to Lower Burma, and decided to sue for peace by November 1285.

=== Ceasefire talks at Tagaung ===
The ceasefire negotiations began in November/December 1285 at Tagaung. The initial Burmese delegation was led by senior ministers and generals Ananda Pyissi and Maha Bo. The Mongol commanders agreed to a ceasefire but demanded a full submission. Ditha Pamauk later joined the negotiations, carrying a gold-leaf memorial for the emperor. The Mongol commanders rejected it because the memorial did not explicitly say that the Burmese king had sent it to the emperor as tribute. The Mongols impressed upon the Burmese delegation that they had 20,000 troops ready to invade further south. A tentative agreement had been reached between the commanders by 3 March 1286. The Burmese agreed to the suzerainty of the Mongol Empire over the Pagan Empire, as well as northern and central parts of the country to be organized as Mongol provinces of Zhengmian (Chinese: 征緬; Wade–Giles: Cheng-Mien) and Mianzhong (Chinese: 緬中; Wade–Giles: Mien-Chung), as well as to send a formal delegation to the emperor's court. (Note: (Wade 2009: 45): Susu Tegin was appointed as the Mianzhong Regional Secretariat on 3 March 1286.)

=== Mission to Beijing ===
At Hlegya, west of Prome (Pyay), the Burmese king deliberated the terms for about three months. He was resigned to submit to the emperor but wanted the occupation forces out of northern Burma. In return, he was willing to pay annual taxes tied to the agricultural output of the country. The task of convincing the emperor would now fall to Ditha Pamauk. In June 1286, he sent an embassy led by the monk and Ananda Pyissi to Beijing. As demanded, the king also sent a gold-leaf memorial stating his allegiance to the emperor. The delegation traveled by Thitseingyi, Hanlin, Momeit, Tagaung to Yunnan. They spent the rest of the Buddhist Lent in Yachan (considered to be on the shores of the Dian Lake). The embassy, without Ananda Pyissi who for some reason remained in Yunnan, resumed the journey after Lent, and arrived at Dadu (modern Beijing) in December/January 1287. (Note: (Luce in MSK 1961: 263): Pyatho 648 ME = 17 December 1286 to 15 January 1287)

Emperor Kublai Khan received the delegation in January 1287. The monk presented the Burmese king's gold-leaf memorial of allegiance addressed to the emperor. The monk then proceeded to persuade the emperor to withdraw his troops from the Pagan territory. He argued that the presence of occupation troops would retard resumption of agriculture in northern Burma, and that the Burmese king would pay annual taxes tied to the agricultural output of the country if the troops were to leave. The monk also appealed to the emperor's religious leanings, saying that not only would a prosperous Pagan feed his troops in Yunnan but also restore the health of Buddhism. The emperor agreed to withdraw the troops. To be sure, it is not clear whether the emperor agreed to withdraw the troops solely due to the monk's appeals. The "concession" may just have been a negotiation ploy. The emperor's actions elsewhere in Southeast Asia suggest that he did not want to deploy his troops for long occupations, and preferred vassal rulers instead. (Note: See (Coedès 1968: 189–217) for Mongol invasions of Pagan, Champa, Cambodia, and Dai Viet.)

The delegation arrived back at Hlegya in May 1287. Pleased with the terms, the king donated 568 hectares in the Mu valley, then under Mongol occupation, along with livestock and serfs, to the monk. (Note: (Luce in MSK 1961: 264): Narathihapate donated 400 pe (ပယ်) in Hanlin and another 400 pe in Kyantu along with livestock and serfs to service the land.) (The king died a few weeks later. On what was to be his return trip to Pagan, he was assassinated en route at Prome on 1 July 1287 by Thihathu, one of his sons.)

== Later years ==
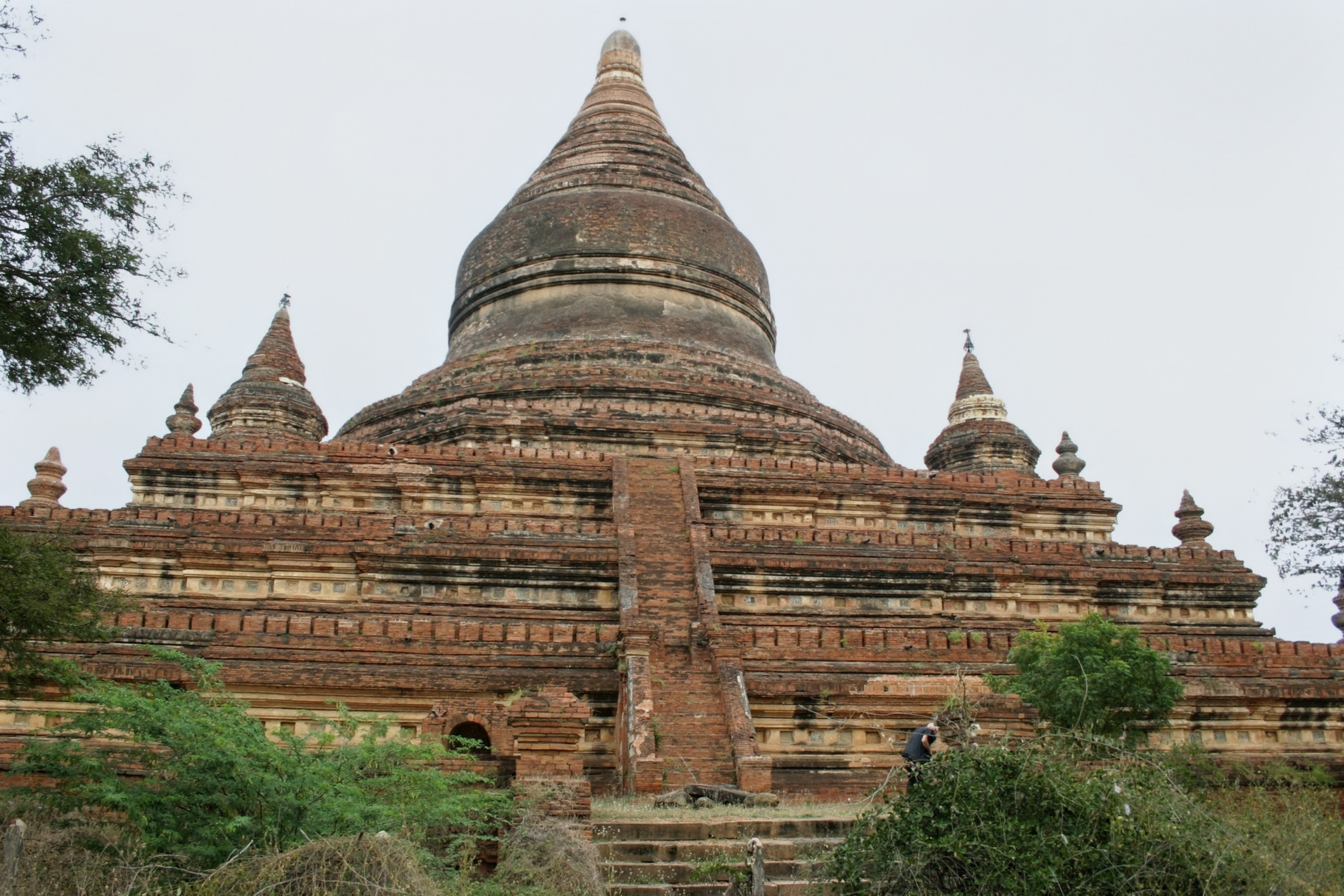
Mingalazedi Pagoda

The monk made it back to Pagan. He left an inscription at a monastery near the Mingalazedi Pagoda in Pagan. The inscription, now at the Bagan Archaeological Museum and known as the Disapramok Inscription, provides a detailed account of the peace negotiations at Tagaung, and at Beijing. It also states the land donations made by the late king, and mentions the completion of the ordination hall, partially donated by the dowager queen Pwa Saw, as well as an impending construction of a school, both near the Mingalazedi Pagoda. It is not clear if the monk remained as the Primate when the next king, Kyawswa, came to power in 1289.

== Commemorations ==
- Shin Ditha Pamauk Hall, at the office of the Ministry of Foreign Affairs in Yangon

== Bibliography ==
- Coedès, George (1968). The Indianized States of South-East Asia. University of Hawaii Press. ISBN 9780824803681.
- Harvey, G. E. (1925). History of Burma: From the Earliest Times to 10 March 1824. London: Frank Cass & Co. Ltd.
- Kyi Pe, U (1973). "Thinbongyi". Myanma Swezon Kyan (in Burmese). Vol. 13 (1 ed.). Yangon: Sarpay Beikman.
- Luce, G.H. (1961). "Shin Ditha Pramok". Myanma Swezon Kyan (in Burmese). Vol. 5 (1 ed.). Heartford, Heartfordshire: Sarpay Beikman.
- Maha Sithu (2012) [1798]. Kyaw Win; Thein Hlaing (eds.). Yazawin Thit (in Burmese). Vol. 1–3 (2nd ed.). Yangon: Ya-Pyei Publishing.
- Nishi, Yoshio (1997). "The Orthographic Standardization of Burmese: Linguistic and Sociolinguistic Speculations" (PDF). University of Kobe.
- Pe Maung Tin (1936). "Disapramok Inscription". JBRS. XXVI (I). Yangon: Burma Research Society.
- Royal Historians of Burma (1960) [c. 1680]. U Hla Tin (ed.). Zatadawbon Yazawin. Historical Research Directorate of the Union of Burma.
- Than Tun (1964). Studies in Burmese History (in Burmese). Vol. 1. Yangon: Maha Dagon.
- Wade, Geoff (2009). Eugene Perry Link (ed.). The Scholar's Mind: Essays in Honor of Frederick W. Mote. Chinese University Press. ISBN 9789629964030.

Buddhist titles
Preceded by	Primate of Pagan Kingdom; 1256–87	Succeeded by
