= Names of Myanmar =

The country known in English as Burma, or Myanmar, has undergone changes in both its official and popular names worldwide. The choice of names stems from the existence of two different names for the country in Burmese, which are used in different contexts.

The official English name Burma (Burmese: မြန်မာ) was changed by the country's national government from the "Union of Burma" to the "Republic of the Union of Myanmar" in 1989. Since then, those name changes have been the subject of controversies and mixed incidences of adoption.

== Burmese names ==
In the Burmese language, Burma is known as Myanmar Pyi (Burmese: မြန်မာပြည်). Myanmar Pyi is the written, literary name of the country, while Bama is the spoken name of the country. Burmese, like Javanese and other languages of Southeast Asia, has different linguistic registers, with sharp differences between literary and colloquial registers. Both names derive ultimately from the endonym of the largest ethnic group in Burma, the Burmans, also known as Bama or Mranma in the spoken and literary registers, respectively. As such, some groups—particularly non-Burmans minorities—consider these names to be exclusionary.

=== "Bama" ===
The colloquial name Bama is supposed to have originated from the name Myanma by shortening of the first syllable, from loss of nasal final "an" (/-àɴ/), reduced to non-nasal "a" (/-à/), and loss of "y" (/-j-/) glide), and then by transformation of "m" into "b". This sound change from "m" to "b" is frequent in colloquial Burmese and occurs in many other words. Although Bama may be a later transformation of the name Myanma, both names have been in use alongside each other for centuries. In 1930s, Ba Thaung, founder of the Dobama Asiayone (We Burmans Association), referred to the country as Bama Pyi (ဗမာပြည်). He felt that the pronunciation of Mranma is "weak" and that of Bama is "strong". He also added that Bama refers to, not only the Mranma ethnic group, but all ethnic groups present in the country.

=== "Mranma" ===
The etymology of Mranma remains unclear. The "Burmans" who entered the central Irrawaddy river valley in the 9th century founded the Pagan Kingdom in 849, and called themselves Mranma. The earliest record discovered of the word was in a Mon inscription dated 1102, inside which the name was spelled Mirma. The first record of the name in a Burmese inscription is dated 1190, in which inscription the name was spelled Myanma.

Ma Thanegi records that the first use of the name 'Mranma' for the country is to be found on a 3 feet (91 cm) high stone inscription dated 597 ME (Traditional Burmese calendar) or 1235 CE. The stone is from the reign of Kyaswa, (1234-1250) son of King Htilominlo (Nadaungmya), Bagan. It is written in early Burmese script. Although the middle of the front side of this stone is damaged, the first line of the better-protected reverse side clearly shows မြန်မာပြည် ("Mranma kingdom"). The inscription is known as the 'Yadana Kon Htan Inscription'. At present it is in Bagan recorded as stone number 43 in the Archaeological Department's collection.

Today in Burmese the name is still spelled Mranma, but over time the "r" sound disappeared in most dialects of the Burmese language and was replaced by a "y" glide, so although the name is spelled "Mranma", it is actually pronounced Myanma today.

In the decades preceding independence, independence parties were in search of a name for the new country to be born, which would be made up not only of Burmese-speaking people, but also of many minorities. In the 1920s, some favoured the name Mranma, which had been the name applied to the old Burmese kingdom conquered by the British Empire in the 19th century. In the 1930s, the left-wing independence parties favoured the name Bama, as they thought this name was more inclusive of minorities than Mranma.

The Burmese puppet state set up by the Japanese occupation forces during the Second World War was officially called Bama. When the Japanese used their own syllabary, they transliterated the three consonants of the Dutch name "Birma" and ended up with the name Biruma (ビルマ). At the time of independence in 1948, the "Union of Burma" was the name that was chosen for the new country, being further amended as the "Socialist Republic of the Union of Burma" in 1974, following a 1962 military coup.

While both the names Bama and Mranma historically referred only to the Burmans and not other ethnic minorities, Burmese governments in the post-independence period have instituted a differentiation of meaning between Mranma and Bama in the official Burmese language usage. The name Myanma/Myanmar was expanded to include all citizens of the country while the name Bama was kept to its original meaning. In Burmese, Bama and Myanma are used interchangeably, to refer to the country, depending on the context. Ironically, because of the official renaming of the country, the dominant ethnic group is now known by its colloquial name, Bama, rather than by its literary name, Mranma in official Burmese usage.

== English names ==
=== History ===
In English, the official name chosen for the country at the time of independence was "Burma". This was already the name that the British called their colony before 1948. This name most likely comes from Portuguese Birmânia and was adopted by English in the 18th century. The Portuguese name itself, a Latinate back-formation (cp. Germânia vs. Alemanha), came from the Indian name Barma which was borrowed by the Portuguese from any of the Indian languages in the 16th or 17th century. This Indian name Barma may derive from colloquial Burmese Bama, but it may also derive from the Indian name Brahma-desh.

Early usage of the English term Burma varies:

- Bermah (Earliest European maps as old as the 18th century spelled Burma with an 'e'.)
- Birmah (Charles Thomson map of 1827)
- Brama (Thomas Kitchin's map of 1787)
- Burmah (Samuel Dunn's map 1787)
- Burma (Keith Johnson's map 1803)
- Burmah (Eugene William's map, 1883)
- Burma (Common stable spelling used in The Times newspaper.)

In 1989, the military regime of Burma set up a commission in charge of reviewing the place names of Burma in the English language. The aim of the commission was to correct the spelling of the place names of Burma in English, to discard spellings chosen by British colonial authorities in the 19th century, and adopt spellings closer to the actual Burmese pronunciation (compare with what happened in India with Calcutta/Kolkata and Calicut/Kozhikode). These renamings took the form of the "Adaptation of Expressions Law", passed on 18 June 1989. Thus, for instance, Rangoon was changed to Yangon to reflect the fact that the "r" sound is no longer used in Standard Burmese and merged with a "y" glide.

As for the country's name, the commission replaced the English name "Burma" with "Myanmar" for three reasons. First, Myanma is the official name of the country in the Burmese language, and the aim of the commission was to have English place names aligned with Burmese place names and pronunciation. Second, the commission thought that the name Myanma was more inclusive of minorities than the name Bama, and wanted the English name of the country to reflect this. Finally, the military regime has long been suspicious of the colloquial Burmese language, which it perceives as subversive; the English name "Burma" mirrors the colloquial Burmese name Bama.

The final "r" in the English "Myanmar" is absent in Burmese Myanma (much as the medial "r" in "Burma" is absent in standard Burmese Bama). The commission added a final "r" in English to represent the low tone of Burmese, in which the word Myanma is pronounced. In the low tone, the final vowel "a" is lengthened. The commission was influenced by Received Pronunciation and other non-rhotic English English dialects, in which "ar" (without a following vowel) is also pronounced as long "a" (often given as "ah" in American English). However, in variants of English in which final "r" is pronounced, such as standard American English, adding this final "r" leads to a pronunciation very different from the Burmese pronunciation.

=== Controversies ===
In the Burmese language, there have been controversies about the name of the country since the 1930s, and the decision of the regime in 1989 carried the controversy into the English language. The regime believes that Myanmar is more inclusive of minorities than Bama, while opponents point out that historically, Myanmar is only a more literary version of Bama.

Quite the opposite of being more inclusive, opposition parties and human rights groups contend that the new English name "Myanmar" is actually disrespectful of the minorities of Burma. Minorities, many of whom do not speak Burmese, had become accustomed to the English name "Burma" over the years, and they perceive the new name "Myanmar" as a purely Burmese name reflecting the policy of domination of the ethnic Burman majority over the minorities.

The regime changed the name of the country when using English; it did not change the official name of the country in Burmese. Former opposition leader Aung San Suu Kyi at first opposed the new name "Myanmar", pointing out the hypocritical justification of inclusivity put forward by the regime. Opposition parties, although they oppose the English name "Myanmar", do not oppose the official Burmese name Mranma, and no opposition party is proposing to use the colloquial name Bama as the official name of the country. Culturally, when speaking, locals refer to the country as Burma, but in literature, it is named "Myanmar".

Finally, a lot of criticism also focused on the lack of linguistic soundness of the reform. Only four language scholars sat in the 1989 commission, while the majority of the commission was made up of military officials and civil servants with no particular knowledge of linguistics. The new names adopted often lacked serious linguistic credibility, and some appear questionable (the final "r" at the end of the name Myanmar makes sense only for a speaker of a non-rhotic dialect of English).

==== Adoption ====
Since the Burmese government's 1989 decision to use "Myanmar" rather than "Burma" when using English, adoption of the new name in the English-speaking world has been mixed. Use of "Burma", along with many other name changes within Myanmar has remained widespread, largely based on the question of whether the regime has the legitimacy to change the country's name, particularly without a referendum.

The United Nations, of which Myanmar is a member, endorsed the name change five days after its announcement. However, the United States still refers to the country as "Burma". The United States government attributes its choice to support for the party deemed to have won the 1990 election but been denied power by the junta. That party opposes the new name.

Following the 2011–2012 democratic reforms in Burma, politicians started using "Myanmar" more frequently. The British government also cites the elected party's preference in its statement on its choice of name. A spokesman for the Department of Foreign Affairs in Canada said that his government's choice was "in support of the struggle for democracy". Others, including the Association of Southeast Asian Nations and the governments of China, India, Japan, Germany, Australia, Canada and Russia recognize "Myanmar" as the official name.

During the 2005 ASEAN summit in Thailand, the Foreign Minister Nyan Win complained about the US insistence of calling his country "Burma" instead of "Myanmar" as it was renamed more than a decade ago. In January 2011, during the Universal Periodic Review (UPR) of the country at the United Nations, the delegate of Myanmar interrupted the delegate of the United States, who had begun her comments on human rights in Myanmar by "welcom[ing] the Burmese delegation to the UPR working group". Myanmar's delegate insisted that the American delegation should use the name "Myanmar", and appealed to the session's president to enforce that rule. The latter commented that "we're here to discuss human rights in Myanmar, we're not here to discuss the name of the country", and asked the American delegation to use Myanmar's official, UN-recognised name. The American delegate continued her comments on human rights violations in Myanmar, without using either name for the country. On 19 November 2012, US President Barack Obama, accompanied by Secretary of State Hillary Clinton on her second visit to the country, referred to the nation as both Myanmar and Burma.

Media usage is also mixed. In spite of the usage by the US government, American news outlets including The New York Times, The Wall Street Journal, The International Herald Tribune and CNN, and US-based international news agencies the Associated Press and Reuters have adopted the name "Myanmar". Others have continued to use "Burma", some of whom have switched to using "Myanmar" years after the name change, such as the Financial Times, citing increasing international acceptance of the new name. The BBC changed to using "Myanmar" in 2014.

Some other sources, including NPR in the US use terms such as "Myanmar, also known as Burma".

Another approach taken by some historians is to continue to use the name "Burma" for describing the history of the country prior to the 1988 military coup and "Myanmar" from there on. This also contravenes the intentions of the government, whose naming reform in 1989 was to apply to the entire history of the country. Those using this approach argue that it is the most politically neutral option.

In June 2014, the Australian government, led by Prime Minister Tony Abbott, continued a long-running discussion on the manner in which Australian officials would refer to the Southeast Asian nation. While Burma was the formal title used by the Australian government, the Labor government revised the national name to the Union of Myanmar in 2012. However, the matter has resurfaced, as the Department of Foreign Affairs and Trade (DFAT) reverted to the former title under Abbott's leadership in late 2013. A reason for the change has not appeared in the media, but, as of June 2014, the Abbott government's policy advises officials to switch between Burma and Myanmar, in accordance with the circumstances at hand. DFAT secretary Peter Varghese explained to the media: "Our ambassador to Myanmar would be our ambassador to Myanmar, because the country to which she is accredited is Myanmar, in the eyes of the government of Myanmar."

In April 2016, soon after taking office, Aung San Suu Kyi clarified that foreigners are free to use either name, "because there is nothing in the constitution of our country that says that you must use any term in particular."

=== Adjectival forms and demonyms ===
Correspondence of terms before and after the 1989 renaming
Existing term	Replaced by	Type
Burma	Myanmar	noun
Burmese	Myanma/Myanmar	adjective
Burman	Bamar	noun
Burman	Bamar	adjective

In Burmese, the word Myanma, when used as a noun, is pronounced in the low tone (long "a", Okell: Myañma/Myăma), whereas when used as an adjective, it is pronounced in the creaky tone (short "a") as if it were spelt "မြန်မာ့" (MLCTS: mranma., Okell: Myañmá/Myămá). To reflect this, in the 1989 government renaming the adjectival form of the country's name "Myanmar" is formed by dropping the final "r" to get "Myanma" (since the final "r" indicates lengthening in non-rhotic English). But currently, the government seems to favour the unchanged term "Myanmar" again, as in various texts issued lately, especially from the Ministry of Education, has stated "Myanmar" as the correct adjective of the country.

Most people, even in Burma, are unaware of these subtleties, as it occurs only in spoken Burmese. Some English speakers have even coined the adjective "Myanmarese" or "Myanmese", to follow English rather than Burmese grammatical rules. These adjectives are not recommended as most natives of Myanmar preferred to be called either the old way of "Burmese", "Myanmar", or "Myanma" representing the many diverse races in the country.

According to the replacement, the name of the dominant ethnicity of Burma, whose people speak the Burmese language, is "Bamar" (again, final "r" only added to denote a long "a" in Burmese). Thus, Myanmar is a country inhabited by the Bamars plus many minorities; and the Bamars and minorities are collectively known as Myanma people.

While the use of the name "Myanmar" is widespread and rivals the use of "Burma", adoption of adjectival forms has been far more limited; in general, terms in use before 1989 have persisted. Citizens of Burma, regardless of their ethnicity, are known as "Burmese", while the dominant ethnicity is called "Burman". The language of the Burmans, however, is known as the Burmese language, not as the Burman language, although confusingly enough the "Burmese" language is considered one of the Tibeto-"Burman" languages.

== Other languages ==
In Assamese the country is known as মান দেশ Man Dex ("Maan country") since the time when the 1st Ahom king Sukapha crossed Patkai hills to come to Assam valley from Myanmar. The period of Burmese invasions to Assam are known as মানৰ দিন Manor Din ("Days of Maan").

In Bengali the name is ব্রহ্মদেশ or 'Brahmadesh'. It is the same in case of Sanskrit and Sanskrit-based languages in other parts of India. This name predates the Portuguese or British names but it is not clear whether this name has roots connected to the 'Mrnma' people or it predates them also.

In Chinese, the name appeared for the first time in 1273 and was recorded as 緬 (pronounced miɛn^{X} in the Middle Chinese of the period, and Miǎn in Modern Standard Mandarin). The present name in the Chinese is 緬甸 (pronounced Miǎndiàn). The Vietnamese Miến Điện is derived from the same term.

In Japan, although the Japanese government's basic position is to use Myanmā (ミャンマー), often media organisations indicate Biruma (ビルマ) in parentheses afterwards. Biruma may be used more often in the spoken language, while Myanmā is more common in written language. Popular Japanese fictional works such as The Burmese Harp (Biruma no tategoto) mean that the name Biruma may have more of an emotional resonance to readers. Historically Japan used the Chinese characters of "Menden" (緬甸) to refer to Burma. This form remains in contemporary usage in abbreviations; for example, the World War II-era Burma-Thailand Railway is still referred to almost exclusively as the Tai-Men Tetsudō (泰緬鉄道).

In Neo-Latin languages, Myanmar is known by a name derived from Burma as opposed to Myanmar in Spanish, Italian, Romanian, and Greek – Birmania being the local version of Burma in both Italian and Spanish, Birmânia in Portuguese, and Birmanie in French. As in the past, French-language media today consistently use Birmanie.

In Tamil, although not used as much anymore, Myanmar was referred to as "Putpagam" (புட்பகம்). It is most likely derived from the name of the Pagan Kingdom. The most iconic reference using this name occurs in Subramania Bharati's "Senthamizh Nadenum" song which also lists other Tamilized place names.

In Thailand, Myanmar is known by Thais as Phm̀ā (Thai: พม่า).

By ISO 639-3 code
Enter an ISO code to find the corresponding language article.
