= Yanda Pyissi =

Burmese army general

Yanda Pyissi ရန္တ ပစ္စည်း

Minister
- In office 1270s–1284
- Monarch: Narathihapate

Personal details
- Born: Ot-Hla Nge c. 1240s Pagan (Bagan)
- Died: c. 5 February 1284 Tagaung
- Children: Khin Hpone

Military service
- Allegiance: Pagan Kingdom
- Branch/service: Royal Burmese Army
- Years of service: 1259–1284
- Rank: General
- Battles/wars: Missagiri (1259–1260); Mongol invasions (1277, 1283–1284)

Yanda Pyissi (Burmese: ရန္တ ပစ္စည်း, pronounced [ʔjàɴda̰ pjɪʔsí]; also spelled Rantapyissi; c. 1240s – 1284) was a minister in the service of King Narathihapate of the Pagan Dynasty of Burma (Myanmar). He was also a general in the Royal Burmese Army under the command of his elder brother Ananda Pyissi. Together they unsuccessfully fought against the first two Mongol invasions (1277–85). Ava kings from Mohnyin Thado to Narapati II, and all Konbaung kings were descended from him.

== Early life ==
He was born Ot-Hla Nge (အုတ်လှငယ်) c. early 1240s to a senior official family in Pagan (Bagan). His father was Yazathingyan, then a minister (အမတ်) at the Pagan court, and his mother may have been Saw Khin Htut, a daughter of King Kyaswa of Pagan. (Note: Chronicles (Hmannan Vol. 1 2003: 360) say that Yazathingyan was married to Saw Khin Htut, and identify her as the mother of Yazathingyan's two daughters.) He had an elder brother Ot-Hla Gyi, and two younger sisters Saw San and Saw Soe. The family grew up in Pagan where his father eventually rose to be the chief minister by 1248. (Note: (Taw, Forchhammer 1899: 114–115): The stone inscription dated Tuesday, 10th waxing of Tazaungmon 610 ME (27 October 1248) at a temple near the Izzagawna monastery lists Kyaswa's senior ministers, of which the name Yazathingyan comes first.)

== Career ==
He and his elder brother both followed his father's footsteps, and by the late 1250s had entered the royal service. The first mention of Ot-Hla Nge in the Burmese chronicles came in 1258 when he was sent by the young king Narathihapate to the front to Missagiri (in present-day Rakhine State) where the army had been trying to put down a rebellion, with an order to execute Thray Pyissapate, the commander of the operation, for his failure to defeat the rebellion. Fortunately for Thray Pyissapate, Ot-Hla Nge was intercepted midway by his father, who was on his way back from Martaban (Mottama), having put down a rebellion there.

In 1259–60, both brothers accompanied their father, then commander-in-chief, on the second Missagiri campaign (in present-day Rakhine State). The campaign ended Missagiri's two-year-old rebellion, and Yazathingyan sent Ot-Hla Nge to Pagan to inform the king of the news of victory. He rushed back to Pagan but he was promptly arrested by the capital guards on the order of the king. The impetuous young king, who had been anxiously waiting for news from the front, initially believed Ot-Hla Nge had fled the battlefield, and returned with the bad news. But Ot-Hla Nge carried the news of the victory, and his life was spared. But their father died on the return trip. Both brothers both vied to succeed their father's title Yazathingyan. The king refused but allowed them to serve at his court with the titles of Ananda Pyissi and Yanda Pyissi, (Note: from Ananta Paccaya and Ranta Paccaya in Pali) respectively.

Now known as Yanda Pyissi, he did not seem escape his brother's shadow. Ananda Pyissi rose to be a minister, by perhaps as early as 1261, (Note: The Maha Yazawin chronicle (Maha Yazawin Vol. 1 2006: 241) suggests that he was made a minister with his father's title Yazathingyan a year after the second Missagiri campaign but Yazawin Thit (Yazawin Thit Vol. 1 2012: 143) and Hmannan Yazawin (Hmannan Vol. 1 2003: 345) both omit that.) and eventually the chief minister by 1271. By the 1270s, Yanda Pyissi had joined as one of the ministers of the Pagan court, which was headed by Ananda Pyissi. Starting from 1271, the court faced repeated demands of the Mongol Empire to submit, which the Burmese king rejected. In 1275, the Yunnan government recommended war to the emperor, who agreed to the recommendation by 1277.

Yanda Pyissi twice went to the front in northern Pagan territories (present-day Dehong Dai and Jingpo Autonomous Prefecture in Yunnan, and Kachin State) in 1277 and 1283–84. In both campaigns, he was the deputy of his brother, the commander-in-chief of the Royal Burmese armed forces. Both campaigns ended in failure. By 1285, the Mongol forces had occupied as far south as Tagaung.

The 1283–84 campaign was the last known record of Yanda Pyissi. Chronicles say that Ananda Pyissi died in action in early 1284 at Tagaung, which is incorrect according to a 1285 stone inscription, which states that Burmese generals Ananda Pyissi and Maha Bo negotiated for peace with the victorious Mongol forces in 1285. It appears that Maha Bo had become Ananda Pyissi's deputy in place of Yanda Pyissi, who may have died in action. If it was Yanda Pyissi that died in the battle of Tagaung, then Yanda Pyissi died in early February 1284 (Tagaung fell on 5 February 1284).

== Family ==
According to the Alaungpaya Ayedawbon chronicle, Yanda Pyissi through his daughter Khin Hpone was an ancestor of Ava kings from Mohnyin Thado to Narapati II and all Konbaung kings.

== Bibliography ==
- Kala, U (1724). Maha Yazawin (in Burmese). Vol. 1–3 (2006, 4th printing ed.). Yangon: Ya-Pyei Publishing.
- Letwe Nawrahta & Twinthin Taikwun (c. 1770). Hla Thamein (ed.). Alaungpaya Ayedawbon (in Burmese) (1961 ed.). Ministry of Culture, Union of Burma.
- Luce, G.H. (1961). Shin Ditha Pramok (in Burmese). Vol. 5 (1 ed.). Heartford, Heartfordshire: Sarpay Beikman.
- Maha Sithu (2012) [1798]. Kyaw Win; Thein Hlaing (eds.). Yazawin Thit (in Burmese). Vol. 1–3 (2nd ed.). Yangon: Ya-Pyei Publishing.
- Royal Historical Commission of Burma (1832). Hmannan Yazawin (in Burmese). Vol. 1–3 (2003 ed.). Yangon: Ministry of Information, Myanmar.
- Taw, Sein Ko; Emanuel Forchhammer (1899). Inscriptions of Pagan, Pinya and Ava: Translation, with Notes. Archaeological Survey of India.
- Than Tun (1964). Studies in Burmese History (in Burmese). Vol. 1. Yangon: Maha Dagon.
