= Eindawthe (Htilominlo) =

Eindawthe အိမ်တော်သည်
- Born: c. 1170s
- Died: 11 May 1198; Pagan (Bagan)?
- Spouse: Htilominlo
- Issue: Naratheinga Uzana; Kyaswa
- House: Pagan
- Father: Theinkhathu
- Religion: Theravada Buddhism

Eindawthe (Burmese: အိမ်တော်သည်, pronounced [ʔèiɴ dɔ̀ ðɛ̀]]) was a wife of Prince Zeya Theinkha (later King Htilominlo). She was the mother of Regent Naratheinga Uzana (r. c. 1231–35) and King Kyaswa (r. 1235–51). She was a great granddaughter of King Sithu I.

She died a week after giving birth to Kyaswa. Since Kyaswa was born on 4 May 1198, she died on 11 May 1198.

== Bibliography ==
- Kala, U (2006) [1724]. Maha Yazawin (in Burmese). Vol. 1–3 (4th ed.). Yangon: Ya-Pyei Publishing.
- Maha Sithu (2012) [1798]. Kyaw Win; Thein Hlaing (eds.). Yazawin Thit (in Burmese). Vol. 1–3 (2nd ed.). Yangon: Ya-Pyei Publishing.
- Royal Historical Commission of Burma (1832). Hmannan Yazawin (in Burmese). Vol. 1–3 (2003 ed.). Yangon: Ministry of Information, Myanmar.
- Than Tun (1964). Studies in Burmese History (in Burmese). Vol. 1. Yangon: Maha Dagon.
