= Htilominlo Temple =

Buddhist temple in Bagan, Myanmar

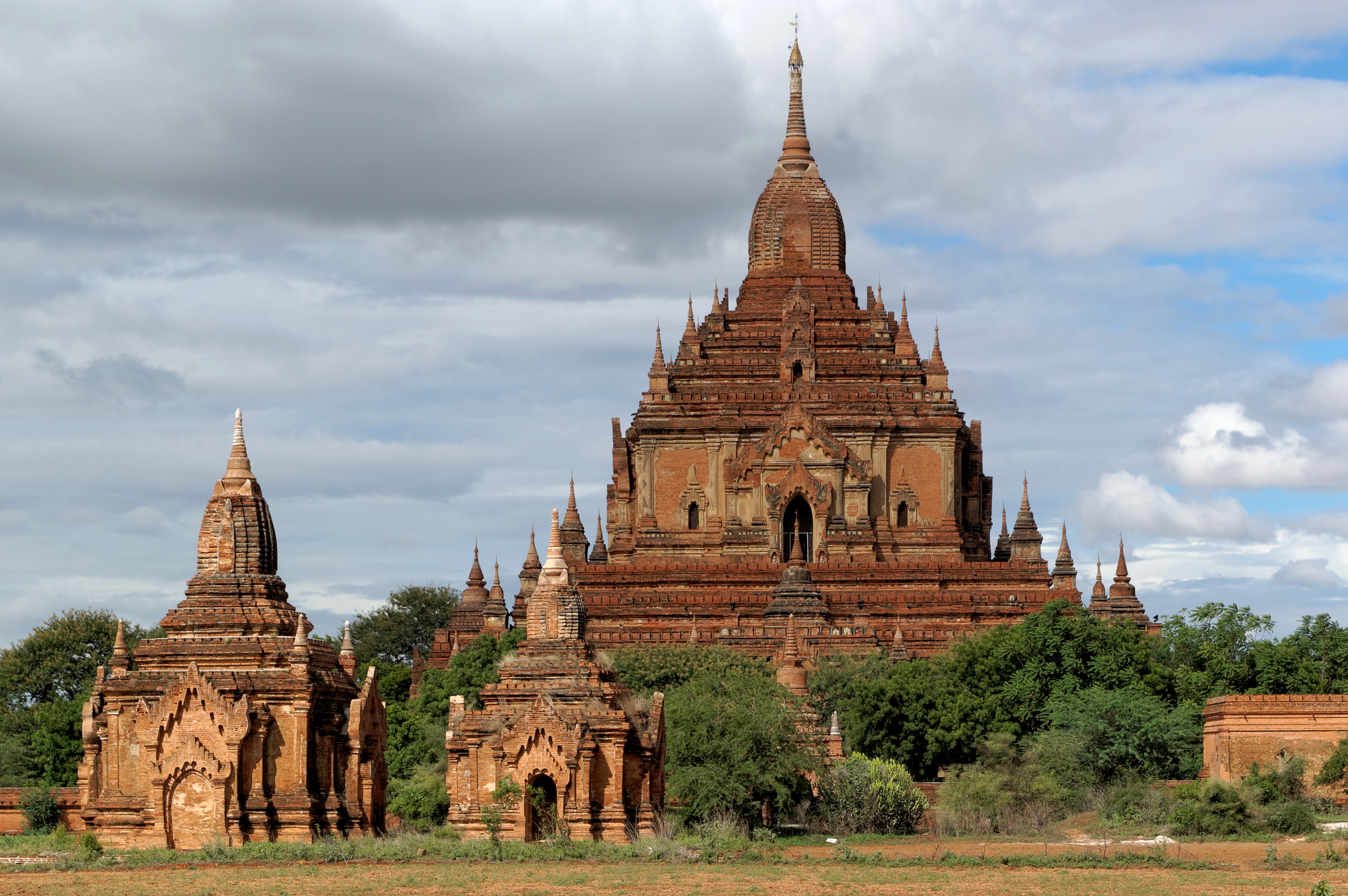
- The Htilominlo Temple at the Bagan Archaeological Site

- Location within Myanmar

Religion
- Affiliation: Theravada Buddhism

Location
- Location: Bagan, Mandalay Region
- Country: Myanmar
- Interactive map of Htilominlo Temple
- Coordinates: 21.178531°N 94.879398°E

Architecture
- Founder: King Htilominlo
- Completed: 1211; 815 years ago

Htilominlo Temple (Burmese: ထီးလိုမင်းလိုဘုရား, pronounced [tʰílòmɪ́ɰ̃lò pʰəjá]) is a Buddhist temple located in Bagan (formerly Pagan), in Burma/Myanmar, built during the reign of King Htilominlo (also known as Nandaungmya), 1211–1231. The temple is three stories tall, with a height of 46 metres (151 ft), and built with red brick. It is also known for its elaborate plaster moldings. On the first floor of the temple, there are four Buddha statues that face each direction. The temple was damaged in the 1975 earthquake and subsequently repaired.

Htilominlo Temple

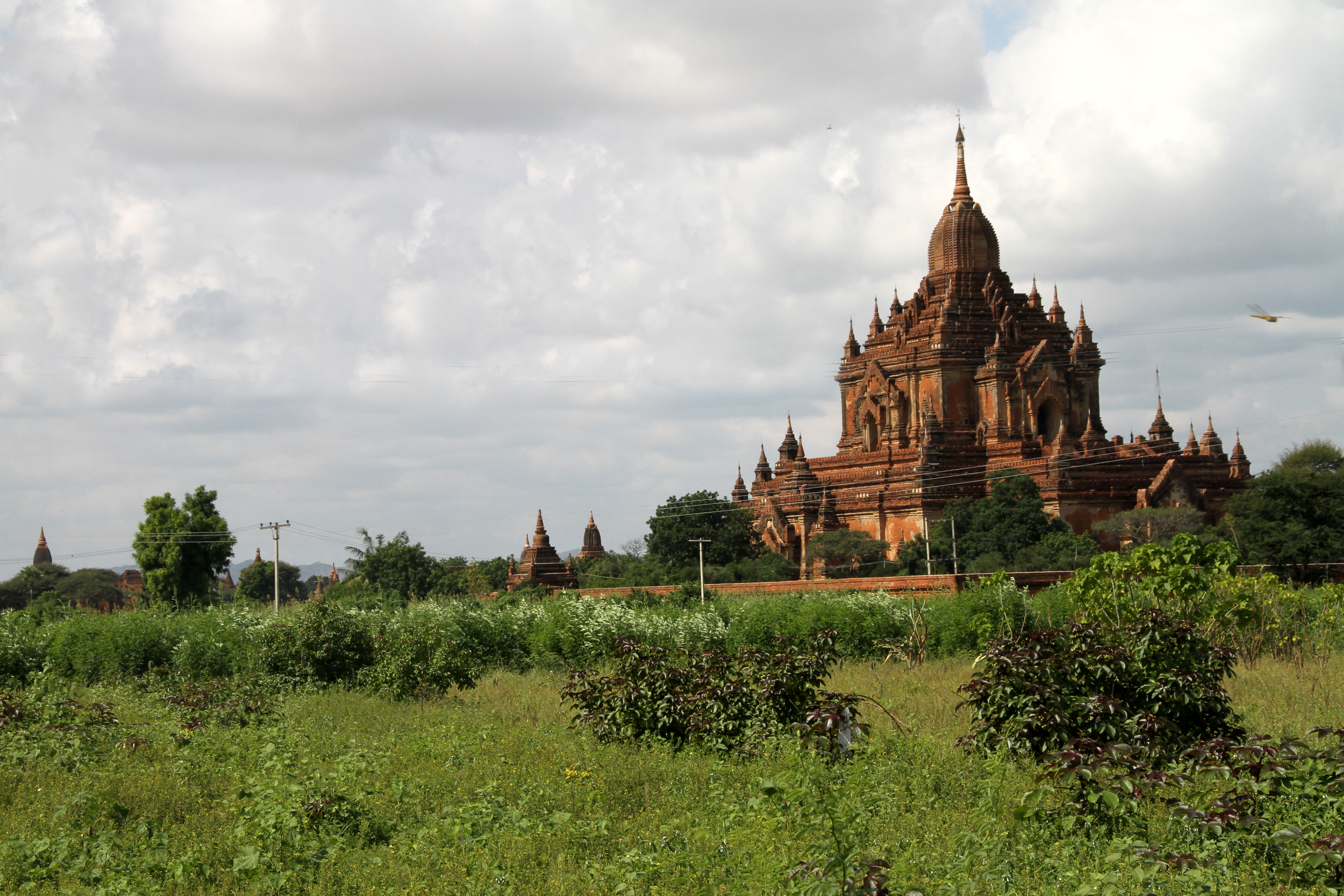

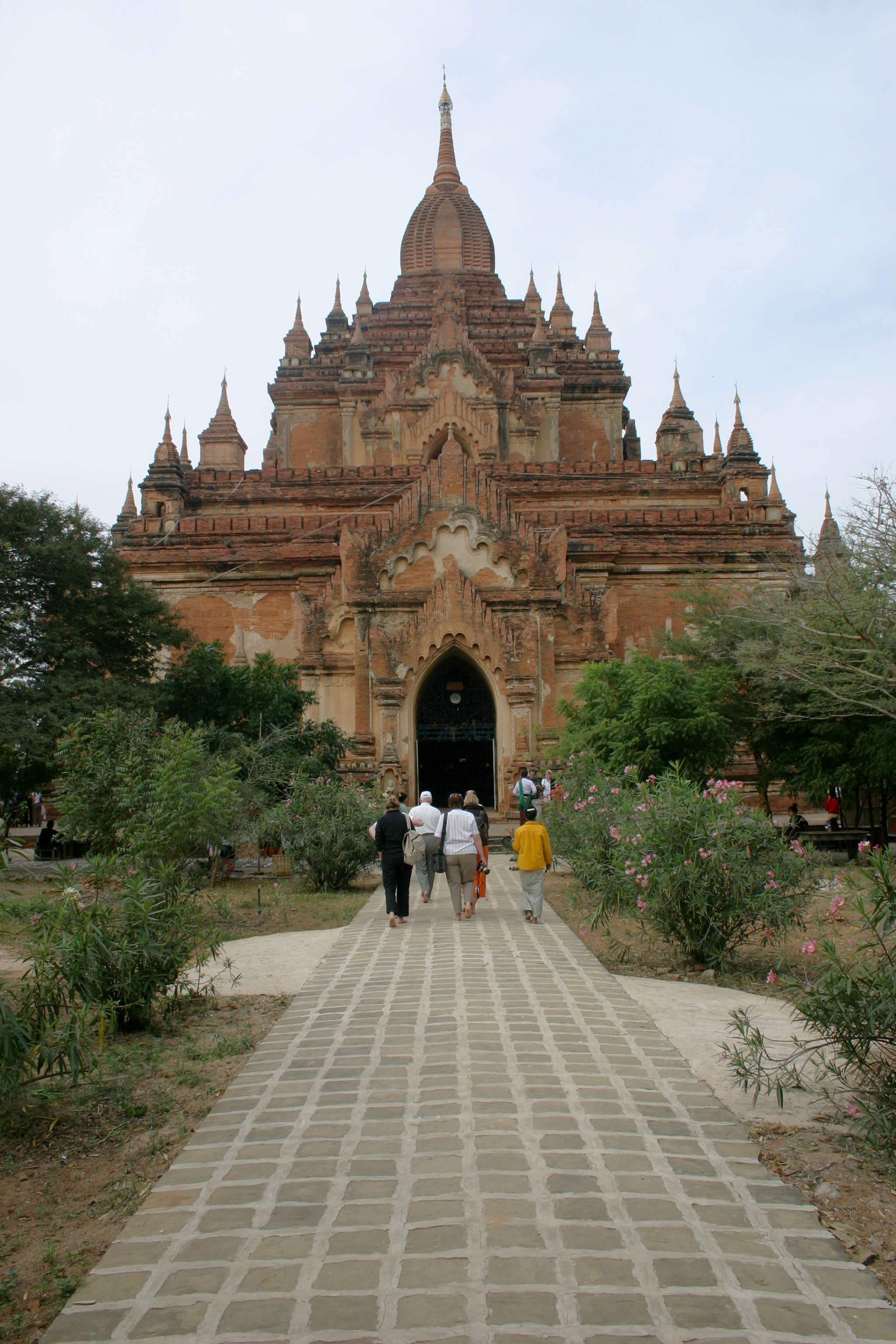

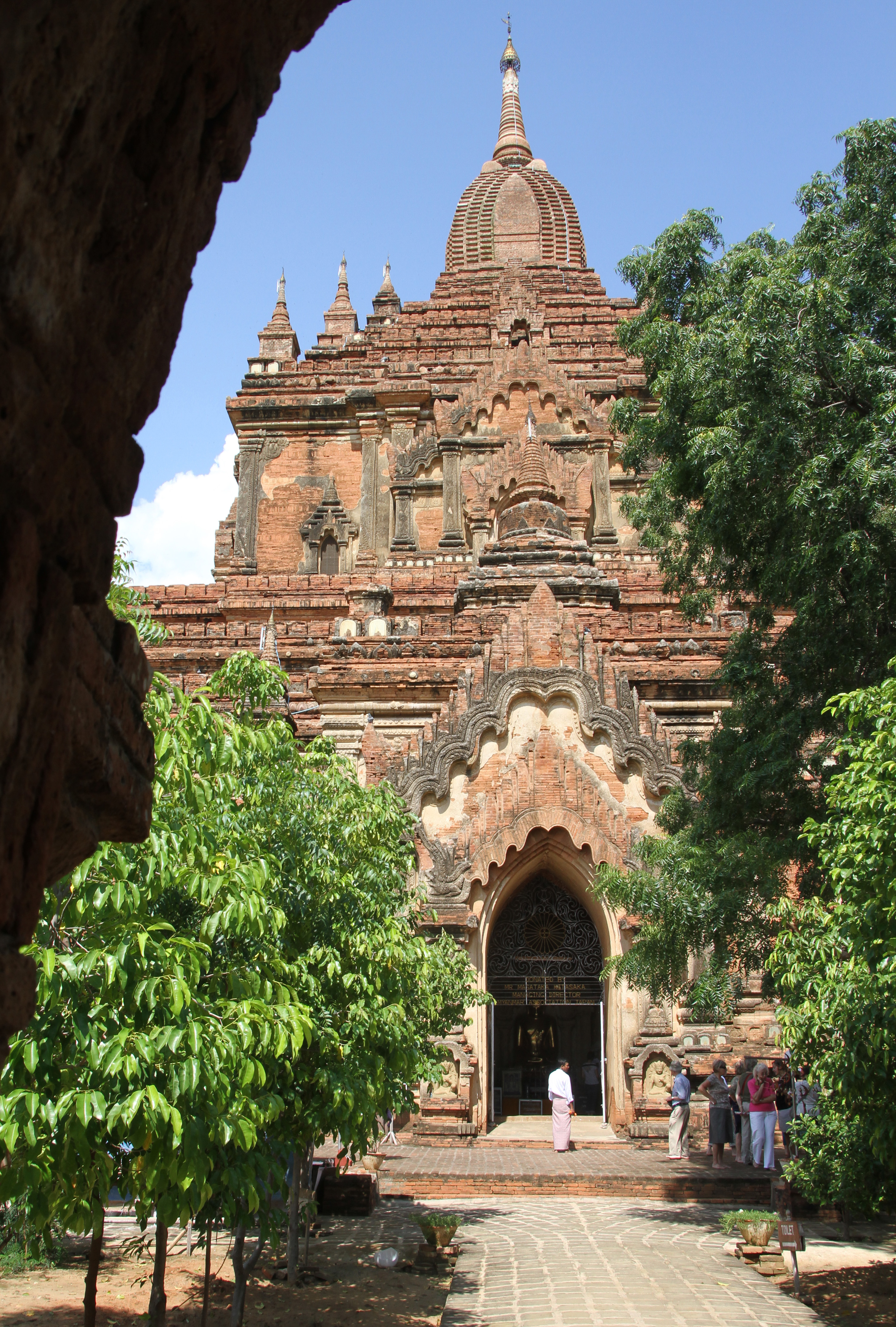

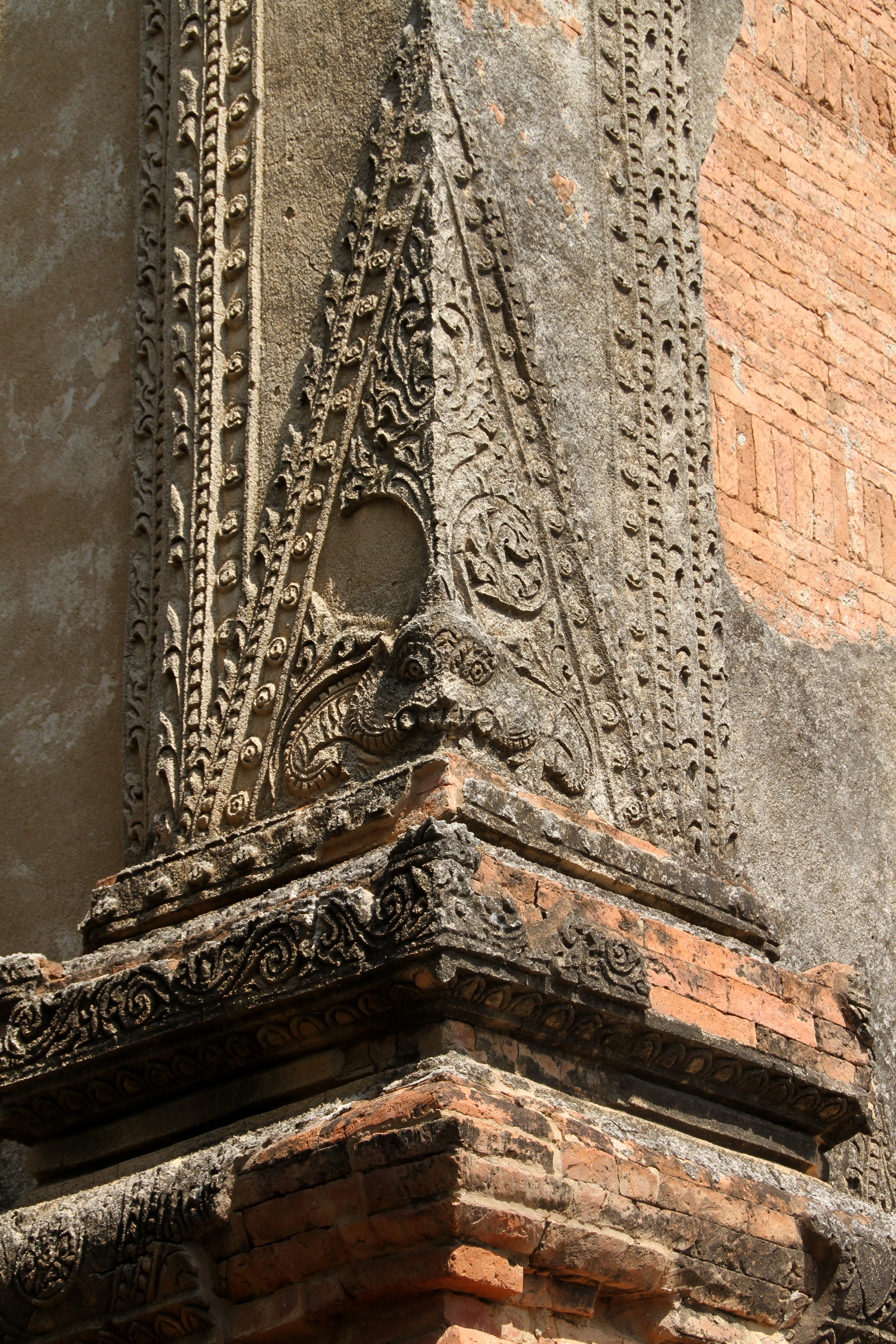

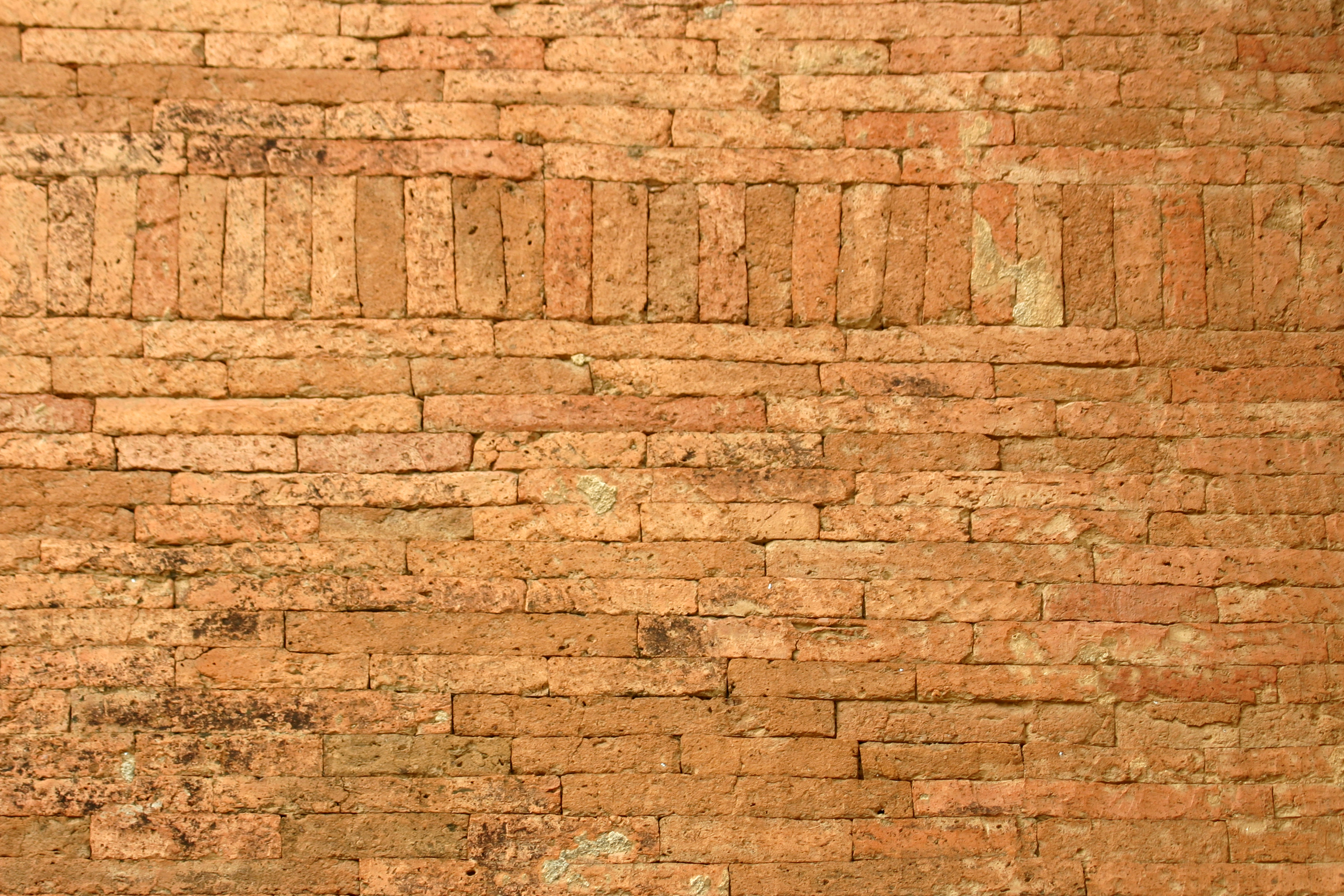

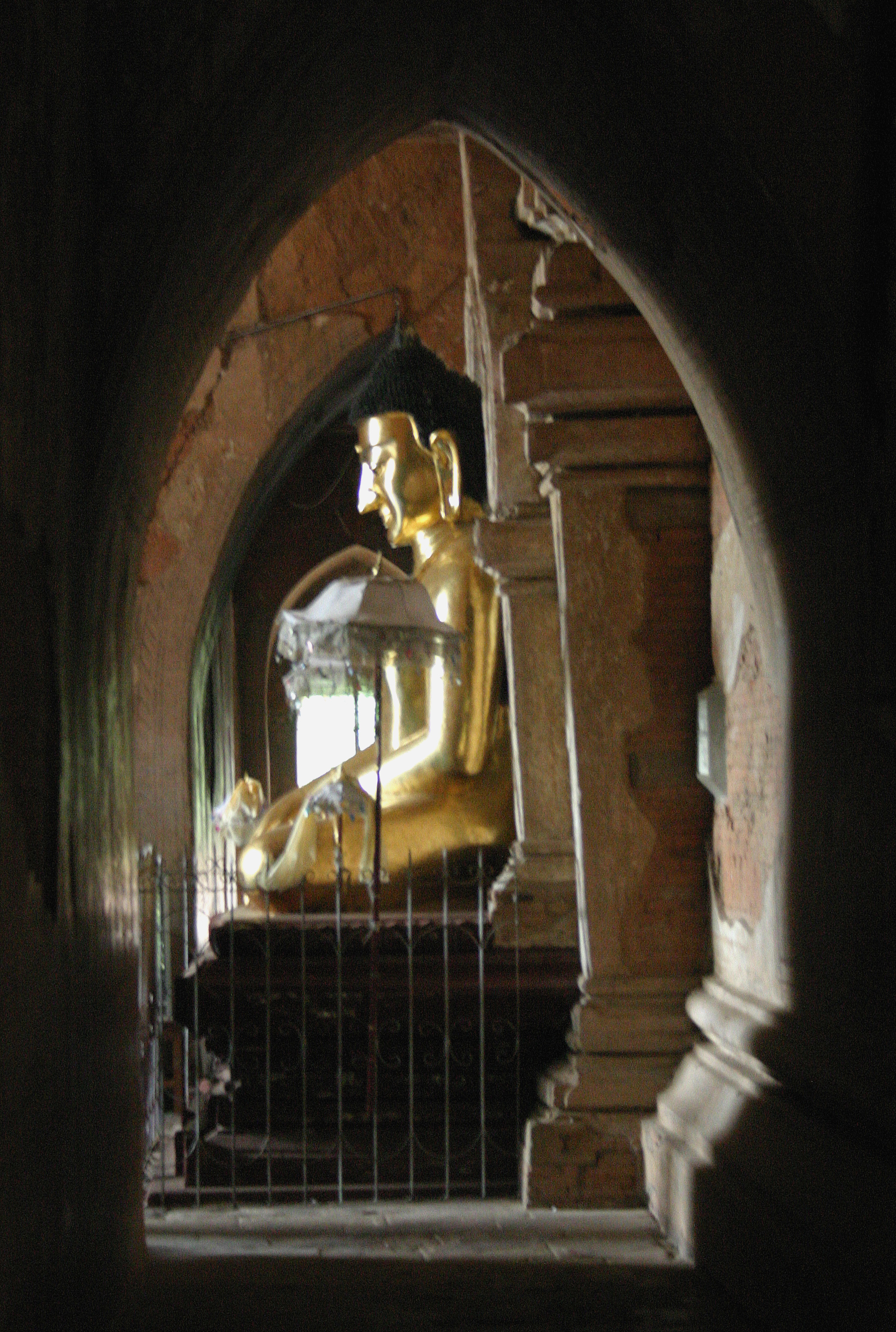
