= Saw Khin Htut of Pagan =

Member of the Burmese royal family

Saw Khin Htut စောခင်ထွတ်
- Born: c. 1220; Pagan (Bagan)
- Spouse: Yazathingyan
- Issue: Ananda Pyissi; Yanda Pyissi; Saw San; Saw Soe
- House: Pagan
- Father: Kyaswa
- Mother: Yaza Dewi
- Religion: Theravada Buddhism

Saw Khin Htut (Burmese: စောခင်ထွတ်, pronounced [sɔ́ kʰɪ̀ɴ tʰʊʔ]) was a princess of the Pagan Dynasty of Burma (Myanmar). She was a daughter of King Kyaswa, and the mother of Queen Saw Soe. Her husband was Yazathingyan who served as the chief minister of her father, and his two successors. She had at least two children Saw San and Saw Soe with Yazathingyan. She may also be the mother of Yazathingyan's two other children Ananda Pyissi and Yanda Pyissi, who were generals in the Pagan army, although chronicles do not explicitly identify her as the mother.

== Bibliography ==
- Royal Historical Commission of Burma (1832). Hmannan Yazawin (in Burmese). Vol. 1–3 (2003 ed.). Yangon: Ministry of Information, Myanmar.
