= Ananda Pyissi =

Ananda Pyissi အနန္တ ပစ္စည်း

Chief Minister-General
- In office in or before 1271–1287
- Monarch: Narathihapate

Personal details
- Born: Ot-Hla c. 1240 Pagan (Bagan)
- Died: 1 July 1287 Prome (Pyay)

Military service
- Allegiance: Pagan Kingdom
- Branch/service: Royal Burmese Army
- Years of service: 1259–1287
- Rank: Commander-in-chief
- Battles/wars: Missagiri (1259–1260); Mongol invasions (1277, 1283–1285)

Ananda Pyissi (Burmese: အနန္တ ပစ္စည်း, pronounced [ʔənàɴda̰ pjɪʔsí]; also spelled Anantapyissi; c. 1240 – 1 July 1287) was a chief minister in the service of King Narathihapate of the Pagan Dynasty of Burma (Myanmar). He was also the commander-in-chief of the Royal Burmese Army, and fought unsuccessfully against the first two Mongol invasions of Burma (1277–85). He led the initial ceasefire negotiations with the Mongols (1285–86). He reportedly was killed alongside the king in 1287 by Thihathu of Prome.

== Early life ==
He was born c. 1240 to a senior official family in Pagan (Bagan). His father was Yazathingyan, then a minister (အမတ်) at the Pagan court, and his mother may have been Saw Khin Htut, a daughter of King Kyaswa of Pagan. (Note: Chronicles (Hmannan Vol. 1 2003: 360) say that Yazathingyan was married to Saw Khin Htut, and identify her as the mother of Yazathingyan's two daughters.) He was the eldest son, and had three siblings: Yanda Pyissi, Saw San and Saw Soe. His personal name was originally Ot-Hla (အုတ်လှ); he later became known as Ot-Hla-Gyi (အုတ်လှကြီး) after his younger brother Ot-Hla-Nge (အုတ်လှငယ်) was born. The family grew up in Pagan where his father eventually rose to be the chief minister by 1248. (Note: (Taw, Forchhammer 1899: 114–115): The stone inscription dated Tuesday, 10th waxing of Tazaungmon 610 ME (27 October 1248) at a temple near the Izzagawna monastery lists Kyaswa's senior ministers, of which the name Yazathingyan comes first.)

== Career ==
=== Early royal service ===
He and his younger brother both followed his father's footsteps, and by the late 1250s had entered the royal service. In 1259–60, both brothers accompanied their father, then commander-in-chief, on the second Missagiri campaign (in present-day Rakhine State). The campaign ended Missagiri's two-year-old rebellion but their father died on the return trip. Both brothers both vied to succeed their father's title Yazathingyan. The king refused but allowed them to serve at his court with the titles of Ananda Pyissi and Yanda Pyissi, respectively. (Note: from Ananta Paccaya and Ranta Paccaya in Pali)

=== Chief minister ===
Ananda Pyissi rose to be a minister, by perhaps as early as 1261, (Note: The Maha Yazawin chronicle (Maha Yazawin Vol. 1 2006: 241) suggests that he was made a minister with his father's title Yazathingyan a year after the second Missagiri campaign but Yazawin Thit (Yazawin Thit Vol. 1 2012: 143) and Hmannan Yazawin (Hmannan Vol. 1 2003: 345) both omit that.) and eventually the chief minister by 1271. In the late Pagan period, the chief minister was the first among four or five ministers of the court, and had the responsibility to command the armed forces as well. (Note: Some of his responsibilities were to administer land surveys for taxation (and of glebe lands). (Taw and Forchhammer 1899: 131): According to a 1281 inscription at the Min Waing monastery campus, Ananda Pyissi ordered a land survey of a glebe land on Sunday, 6th waning of Tazaungmon 643 ME (2 November 1281).) As chief minister, Ananda Pyissi spent much of the 1270s trying to keep his kingdom out of the advancing grasp of the Mongol Empire. In 1271, the Mongols, who first captured the neighboring state to the northeast of Pagan in 1253, demanded nominal tribute. Aware of the gravity of the situation, Ananda Pyissi advised the king to use diplomacy, and avoid war. But there was little room to maneuver. Not only did the king refuse to submit, but he sent an army to reconquer the Wa and Palaung regions at the border that had gone over to the Mongols. The Yunnan government sent another embassy on 3 March 1273 to Pagan, again demanding tribute. Ananda Pyissi's court tried to stall the Mongol embassy. But the king again refused, and according to the chronicles, he ordered the diplomats executed over the objections of Ananda Pyissi. (Note: See (Hmannan Vol. 1 2003: 351–352) for the chronicle narrative. But Than Tun (Than Tun 1964: 136) doubts that narrative, saying that a contemporary inscription (at the Mahazedi Pagoda) states how diplomats were to be treated, and never to be harmed.) At any rate, in 1275, the Yunnan government recommended war to the emperor. The emperor agreed.

=== Commander-in-chief ===
By then, the Burmese government too had expected war. In early 1277, Ananda Pyissi and Yanda Pyissi led the Royal Burmese Army, and marched to the border. In April, they met the Mongol invasion force—which consisted mostly of Turkic-speaking battalions—at the border, in present-day Yunnan. In the ensuing battle of Ngasaunggyan, the larger Burmese army was defeated by the smaller, more mobile Mongol army. The battle was witnessed and reported by Marco Polo, and a 1278 inscription at Pagan corroborates the army's defeat at Ngasaunggyan.

Despite the military success, the Yunnan government could not establish its rule of the borderlands in the following years, and Pagan did not give up its claim on them. In September 1283, the Mongol government decided to impose tighter control by establishing a province, made up of the borderlands and northern Burma (present-day southwestern Yunnan and Kachin State). The Mongols sent in another army. Ananda Pyissi and Yanda Pyissi again led the Burmese army. The two armies again met at Ngasaunggyan on 3 December 1283. The Burmese were again defeated. The Mongols chased the retreating Burmese armies and defeated them at Kaungsin on 9 December 1283. Ananda Pyissi and the army fell back to Tagaung but could not defend it. Tagaung fell in January 1284. The Mongols pressed on down to the Irrawaddy valley, and perhaps threatened as far south as Pagan by January 1285. (Note: According to the chronicle Zatadawbon Yazawin (Yazawin Thit Vol. 1 2012: 148, footnote 7), the Mongols attacked Pagan itself on 26 January 1285 (5th waning of Tabodwe 646 ME). But Chinese records do not mention it. And recent research per Aung-Thwin 2012: 105 and Lieberman 2003: 119 indicates that Mongol forces never reached Pagan.) After the dust settled, the Mongols had gained up to Tagaung, and established a Mongol province with a garrison at Tagaung. The Burmese king finally sent Ananda Pyissi and Maha Bo to negotiate. The initial ceasefire negotiations were successful insofar as maintaining the line of control as well as setting the stage for further negotiations for a permanent agreement, which were to take place in Beijing. (Note: (Yazawin Thit Vol. 1 2012: 148, fn 10): The Pagan embassy led by Shin Dithapamauk, a monk, met Emperor Kublai Khan in January 1287, and persuaded the emperor to return northern Burma in exchange for annual tribute.)

The 1285 peace negotiations, recorded in a contemporary inscription, were the last known Burmese record of Ananda Pyissi. Chronicles incorrectly say that he was killed in action during the second Mongol invasion in early 1284 (Note: (Hmannan Vol. 1 2003: 354): Before the calendar turned to 646 ME.) by an arrow shot. According to Chinese records, the Yunnan prince re-appointed someone by the name of Ananda as the Burmese king's senior official (presumably as chief minister), and that Ananda was killed alongside the king when the king was assassinated.

== Bibliography ==
- Aung-Thwin, Michael A.; Maitrii Aung-Thwin (2012). A History of Myanmar Since Ancient Times (illustrated ed.). Honolulu: University of Hawai'i Press. ISBN 978-1-86189-901-9.
- Harvey, G. E. (1925). History of Burma: From the Earliest Times to 10 March 1824. London: Frank Cass & Co. Ltd.
- Kala, U (1724). Maha Yazawin (in Burmese). Vol. 1–3 (2006, 4th printing ed.). Yangon: Ya-Pyei Publishing.
- Lieberman, Victor B. (2003). Strange Parallels: Southeast Asia in Global Context, c. 800–1830, volume 1, Integration on the Mainland. Cambridge University Press. ISBN 978-0-521-80496-7.
- Maha Sithu (1798). Myint Swe; Kyaw Win; Thein Hlaing (eds.). Yazawin Thit (in Burmese). Vol. 1–3 (2012, 2nd printing ed.). Yangon: Ya-Pyei Publishing.
- Myint-U, Thant (2006). The River of Lost Footsteps—Histories of Burma. Farrar, Straus and Giroux. ISBN 978-0-374-16342-6.
- Royal Historical Commission of Burma (1832). Hmannan Yazawin (in Burmese). Vol. 1–3 (2003 ed.). Yangon: Ministry of Information, Myanmar.
- Taw, Sein Ko; Emanuel Forchhammer (1899). Inscriptions of Pagan, Pinya and Ava: Translation, with Notes. Archaeological Survey of India.
- Than Tun (1964). Studies in Burmese History (in Burmese). Vol. 1. Yangon: Maha Dagon.
- Wade, Geoff (2009). Eugene Perry Link (ed.). The Scholar's Mind: Essays in Honor of Frederick W. Mote. Chinese University Press. ISBN 9789629964030.
