= Naratheinga Uzana =

Naratheinga Uzana နရသိင်္ဃ ဥဇနာ
- King of Pagan (disputed)

King of Burma (disputed)
- Reign: 1231? – 1235
- Predecessor: Htilominlo
- Successor: Kyaswa
- Born: in or before 1197; Pagan (Bagan)
- Died: July 1235; Pagan
- Consort: Shin Saw; Saw Min Waing
- Issue: Uzana
- House: Pagan
- Father: Htilominlo
- Mother: Eindawthe
- Religion: Theravada Buddhism

Naratheinga Uzana (Burmese: နရသိင်္ဃ ဥဇနာ, pronounced [nəɹa̰ θéiɴga̰]; also known as Naratheinkha Uzana; 1190s–1235) was the king of Pagan from c. 1231 to 1235. He is regarded by G.H. Luce and Than Tun as king between 1231 and 1235 but other historians such as Htin Aung and Michael Aung-Thwin do not accept him as king.

One contemporary stone inscription identifies him as the crown prince, and another identifies him as the king. Neither inscription provides any regnal dates but they were conjecturally dated c. 1230 or c. 1231 by Luce. Luce and Than Tun accept that he was king. It is not universally accepted. Htin Aung does not accept Luce's proposed regnal dates; he argues that the fact that none of the chronicles identifies him as king shows that "his succession was disputed or officially unrecognized." According to Htin Aung, he may have been a pretender to the throne for a few months. Aung-Thwin does not identify Naratheinga as king either. (Note: See (Aung-Thwin and Aung-Thwin 2012: 99) and (Aung-Thwin 1985: 22).)

== Bibliography ==
- Aung-Thwin, Michael (1985). Pagan: The Origins of Modern Burma. Honolulu: University of Hawai'i Press. ISBN 0-8248-0960-2.
- Aung-Thwin, Michael A.; Maitrii Aung-Thwin (2012). A History of Myanmar Since Ancient Times (illustrated ed.). Honolulu: University of Hawai'i Press. ISBN 978-1-86189-901-9.
- Htin Aung, Maung (1970). Burmese History before 1287: A Defence of the Chronicles. Oxford: The Asoka Society.
- Than Tun (1964). Studies in Burmese History (in Burmese). Vol. 1. Yangon: Maha Dagon.

Naratheinga Uzana Pagan Kingdom Born: 1190s Died: 1235
Regnal titles
Preceded by Htilominlo	Regent of Burma; 1231?–1235	Succeeded by Kyaswa
Royal titles
Preceded by Htilominlo	Heir to the Burmese Throne ? – 1231?	Succeeded by Kyaswa
