= First Mongol invasion of Burma =

1277–1287 Yuan conquest of the Pagan kingdom

- Part of the Mongol invasions and Kublai Khan's campaigns
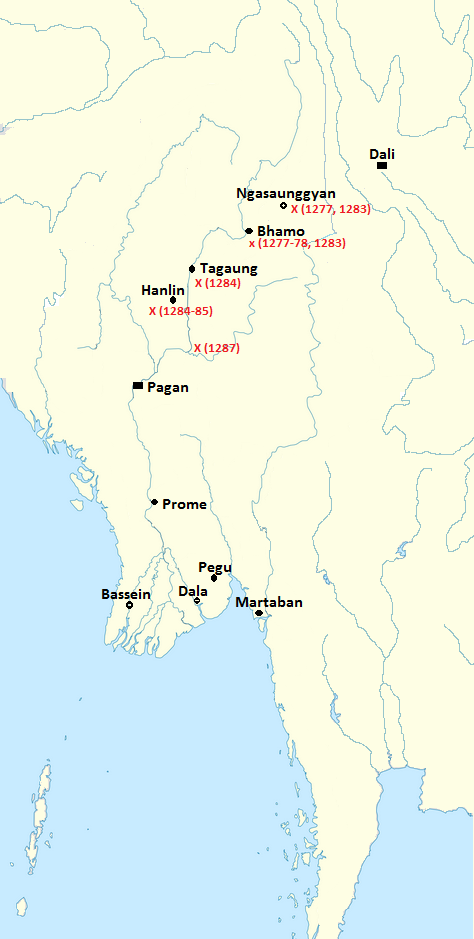
- Sites of battles (1277–1287); Pagan might have also seen a battle in 1287
Date	1277–1278, 1283–1285 and 1287
Location	Upper Burma, Dehong and Baoshan, Yunnan
Result	Mongol victory; Collapse of the Pagan Empire; Rise of Shan states
Territorial changes	Northern Burma to Tagaung added to the Yuan dynasty

Belligerents
Yuan dynasty	Pagan Empire

Commanders and leaders
Kublai Khan; Huthukh (1277); Nasr al-Din (1277–1278); Sangudar (1283–1285); Ye-sin Timour (1287)	Narathihapate; Ananda Pyissi (1277–1285); Yanda Pyissi † (1277–1284?); Maha Bo (1283–1285); Athinkhaya (1287); Yazathingyan (1287); Thihathu (1287)

Units involved
Imperial Mongol Army; Turkic regiments; Central Asian regiments; Persian regiments; Mongol regiments	Royal Burmese Army

Strength
1277–1278: 12,000 1283–1285: 24,000+ (Note: (Wade 2009: 36–37): The exact strength of the 1283 invasion force is not known. The Yunnan command initially requested 10,000 men from the high command, which determined that the invasion required 60,000 men. The high command sent troops from Sichaun, Helazhang, Sizhou, Bozhou and Xuzhou. It is not clear if the number of troops totaled 60,000.): 10,000 Sichuan troops; 14,000 Persian troops; Other regiments; 1287: 20,000+	1277–1278: Unknown 1283–1285: 10,000+ 1287: Unknown

Casualties and losses
1277–1278: Unknown 1283–1285: Unknown 1287: 7,000	1277–1278: Unknown 1283–1285: 10,000+ 1287: Unknown

The first Mongol invasion of Burma (Burmese: မွန်ဂို–မြန်မာ စစ် (၁၂၇၇–၁၂၈၇); Chinese: 元緬戰爭) was a series of military conflicts between Kublai Khan's Yuan dynasty, a division of the Mongol Empire, and the Pagan Empire that took place between 1277 and 1287. The invasions toppled the 250-year-old Pagan Empire, and the Mongol army seized Pagan territories in present-day Dehong, Yunnan and northern Burma to Tagaung. The invasions ushered in 250 years of political fragmentation in Burma and the rise of ethnic Tai-Shan states throughout mainland Southeast Asia.

The Mongols first demanded tribute from Pagan in 1271–1272, as part of their drive to encircle the Song dynasty of China. When King Narathihapate refused, Emperor Kublai Khan himself sent another mission in 1273, again demanding tribute. It too was rejected. In 1275, the emperor ordered the Yunnan government to secure the borderlands in order to block an escape path for the Song, and permitted a limited border war if Pagan contested. Pagan did contest but its army was driven back at the frontier by the Mongol army in 1277–1278. After a brief lull, Kublai Khan in 1281 again turned his attention to Southeast Asia, demanding tribute from Pagan, the Khmer Empire, Đại Việt and Champa. When the Burmese king again refused, the emperor ordered an invasion of northern Burma. Two dry season campaigns (1283–1285) later, the Mongols had occupied territories down to Tagaung and Hanlin, forcing the Burmese king to flee to Lower Burma. The Mongols organized northern Burma as the province of Zhengmian.

Truce negotiations began in 1285, and ended with Narathihapate finally agreeing to submit in June 1286. The Burmese embassy, received by the emperor in Beijing in January 1287, agreed to a treaty that acknowledged the suzerainty of the Mongol Empire over the Pagan Empire and annual payments in taxes to the Yunnan government in exchange for the evacuation of Mongol troops from northern Burma, but the treaty never really took effect as Narathihapate was assassinated in July 1287, and no authority who could honor the treaty emerged. The Mongol command at Yunnan now deemed the imperial order to withdraw void, and ordered an invasion of central Burma. They may not have reached Pagan, and even if they did, after having suffered heavy casualties, they returned to Tagaung.

The Pagan Empire disintegrated and anarchy ensued. The Mongols, who probably preferred the situation, did nothing to restore order in the next ten years. In March 1297, they accepted the voluntary submission of King Kyawswa of Pagan although he controlled little beyond the capital city of Pagan (Bagan). But Kyawswa was overthrown nine months later, and the Mongols were forced to intervene, leading to their second invasion in 1300–1301.

Marco Polo reported the first invasions (1277–1287) in his travelogue, Il Milione. The Burmese referred to the invaders as the Taruk (after the central Asian Turkic troops that largely made up the Mongol invasion army); today, the term Taruk (တရုတ်) refers to the Han Chinese instead. King Narathihapate is unkindly remembered in Burmese history as Taruk-Pye Min, ("the King who Fled from the Taruk").

== Background ==
=== Pagan and Dali ===
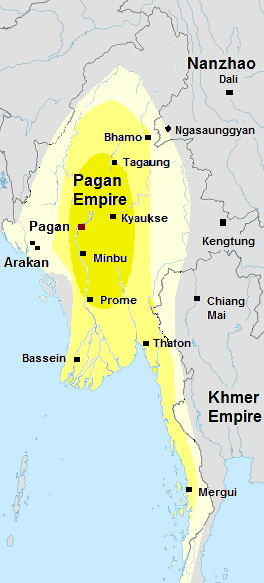
Pagan Empire during Sithu II's reign. Burmese chronicles also claim Kengtung and Chiang Mai. Core areas shown in darker yellow. Peripheral areas in light yellow.

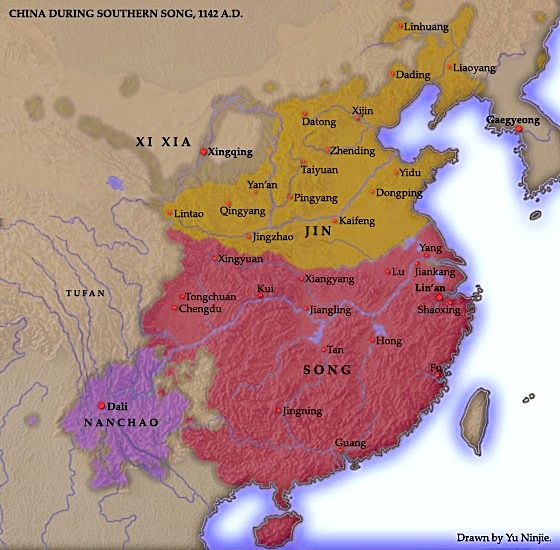
Dali Kingdom c. mid-12th century

In the 13th century, the Pagan Empire, along with the Khmer Empire, was one of the two main empires in mainland Southeast Asia. For much of its history, Pagan's neighbor to the northeast was not China but the independent Dali Kingdom and its predecessor Nanzhao, both with Dali as their capital city. Dali-based kingdoms were a power in their own right, at times allying themselves with the Tibetan Empire to their west and at other times with China's Tang and Song dynasties. Indeed, Nanzhao's mounted armies ventured deep into what is today Burma and may have been behind the founding of the medieval city of Pagan and the Pagan dynasty itself.

Between the newly conquered Mongol territory and Pagan were a wide swath of borderlands stretching from present-day Dehong, Baoshan and Lincang prefectures in Yunnan as well as the Wa and Palaung regions (presumably in present-day northern Shan State), (Note: Burmese sources per (Than Tun 1964: 136) simply refer to Wa and Palaung regions. It is unclear if the regions in the 13th century were located in the same Wa and Palaung regions of the present day. According to Marco Polo (Yule 1874: 81) (Haw 2006: 104), Pagan attacked Zardandan or the Gold Teeth state in 1272; if it is true, the Wa and Palaung regions may have been the same as the Gold Teeth region in present-day Dehong and Baoshan prefectures.) which Pagan and Dali had both claimed and exercised overlapping spheres of influence. Then as now, the borderlands mostly consist of forbidding terrains of high mountain ranges.

=== Mongol conquest of Dali ===
The Mongol Empire first arrived at the doorstep of the Pagan Empire in 1252 by invading the Dali Kingdom in its attempt to outflank Song China. The Mongol armies captured the capital, Dali, on 7 January 1253, and went on to pacify much of the kingdom by 1257.

The arrival of the Mongols did not initially upset the existing order at the borderlands as the Mongols were intent on finishing off the Song. For the next dozen years, they consolidated their hold over the newly conquered land, which not only provided them with a base from which to attack the Song from the rear but also was strategically located on the trade routes from China to Burma and India. The Mongols set up military garrisons, manned mostly by Turkic-speaking Muslims from Central Asia, in 37 circuits of the former Dali Kingdom.

=== Decline of Pagan ===
By then, the Pagan Empire, despite outward appearances of calmness, had been in long and slow decline since the early 13th century. The continuous growth of tax-free religious wealth had greatly reduced the tax base of the kingdom. The crown had lost resources needed to retain the loyalty of courtiers and military servicemen, inviting a vicious circle of internal disorders and external challenges. Although it was able to put down the first batch of serious rebellions in 1258–1260 in South Arakan and Martaban (Mottama), the decline continued. On the eve of the Mongol invasions, between one and two-thirds of Upper Burma's cultivable land had been donated to religion. The crown's ability to mobilize defenses was in serious jeopardy.

== Prelude to war ==
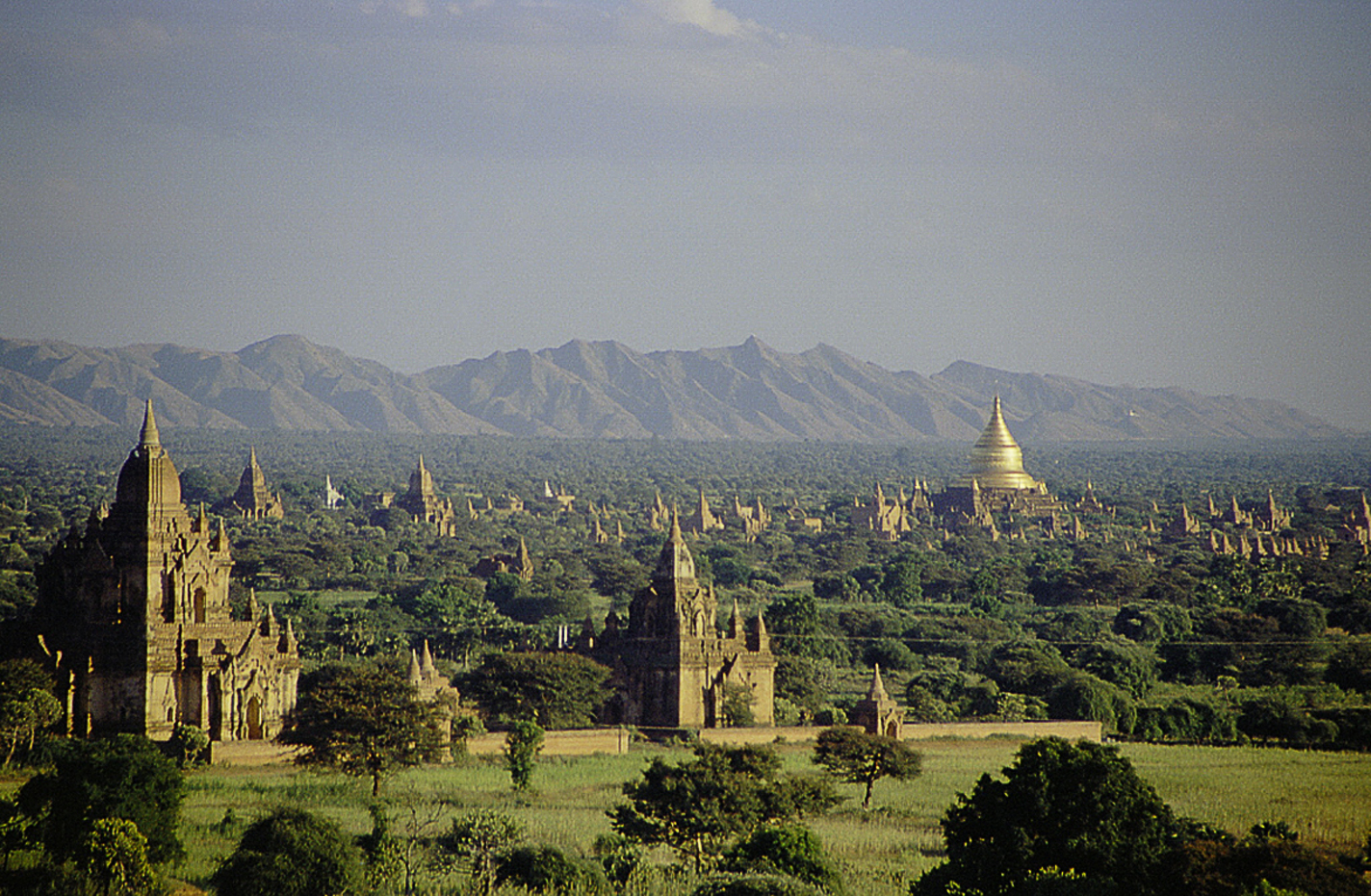
Bagan plains today

=== First Mongol mission (1271–1272) ===
The period of calm for Pagan ended in the early 1270s. By then, the Song were on the ropes, and Emperor Kublai Khan, who officially founded the Yuan dynasty on 18 December 1271, sought to cut off the retreat of Song refugees in all directions. In Pagan's case, he had ordered the Mongol governor of Dali to tighten control of the borderlands, and in January 1271 to send a mission to Pagan to demand tribute. The tribute he demanded was nominal. Given his higher priority preoccupations elsewhere, the emperor was not looking to replace the regime at Pagan. At the border, the ruler of the Wa and Palaung regions submitted to the Mongols.

When the Mongol envoys led by Qidai Tuoyin showed up, the Pagan court led by Chief Minister Ananda Pyissi was well aware of the military power of the Mongols and advised King Narathihapate to use diplomacy. The king was furious at the demand and kept the Mongol envoys waiting for weeks. The court finally devised a compromise: the envoys were sent back without ever seeing the king. Accompanying them was a Burmese envoy who carried a letter expressing friendly sentiments and the Burmese king's wish to one day worship a Buddha tooth at Beijing. The king then promptly ordered an expedition, which retook the rebellious borderland regions in April 1272. The rebel leader A-Pi (အပိ) was brought back to Pagan. Dali relayed the news to Beijing but did not carry out any military action.

=== Second Mongol mission (1273) ===
At Beijing, Kublai Khan, who was preparing an invasion of Japan, decided against a war with Pagan—for the time being. On 3 March 1273, he sent a 4-member delegation led by an imperial ambassador, the First Secretary to the Board Rites, to Pagan. The delegation carried a letter from the emperor. The letter says:

"If you have finally decided to fulfill your duties towards the All-Highest, send one of your brothers or senior ministers, to show men that all the world is linked with Us, and enter into a perpetual alliance. This will add to your reputation, and be in your own interests; for if it comes to war, who will be the victor? Ponder well, O king, Our words."

This time, the Burmese king received the imperial envoys but still refused to submit. The Burmese chronicles say that the king was so insulted that he had the envoys executed, although both Burmese inscriptional evidence and Yuan records indicate to the contrary. At any rate, the imperial envoys did not return to Yunnan in due time. The newly formed Yunnan government sent another delegation to investigate the whereabouts of the delegation, but the delegation could not reach Pagan because of an ongoing rebellion en route.

=== Mongol consolidation of borderlands (1275–1276) ===
Meanwhile, in 1274, the former Dali Kingdom was officially reorganized as the province of Yunnan, with Sayyid Ajjal Shams al-Din Omar as governor. (Note: (Myint-U 2011: 172): Ajjall's official title was "Director of Political Affairs of the Regional Secretariat of Yunnan.") In May 1275, the governor sent a report to the emperor stating that the embassy had not returned; (Note: (Wade 2009: 20): The envoys were located in November/December 1275.) that the Burmese evidently had no intention of submitting; and that war was the only way forward.

But the emperor rejected an outright invasion. Just coming off a disastrous Japanese campaign, the emperor was unwilling to commit the central government troops to what he considered a low priority affair. He was now focused on delivering the final blow against the Song; the emperor ordered the Yunnan provincial army to secure the borderlands in order to block the escape path of the Song refugees. He also sanctioned a limited border war if Pagan contested the takeover. As planned, the Yunnan army proceeded to consolidate the borderlands in 1275–1276. Elsewhere, the main Mongol armies had captured most of the Song territory by 1276.

By 1277, at least one Burmese vassal state named "Gold Teeth" (modern Yingjiang) had submitted to the Mongols. (Note: (Haw 2006: 104): Marco Polo called the state as Zardandan, Persian for Gold Teeth. According to the Burmese records, it seems to be the same Wa and Palaung states where the Army had put down a rebellion in 1272.) Like in 1272, the Burmese government responded by sending an army to reclaim the rebellious state; but unlike in 1272, the Mongols had posted a sizable garrison there. Though it was ultimately under Mongol command, many of the officers and most of the soldiers of the garrison were Turkic-speaking peoples or people from the further west: Turks from Samarkand, Bukhara, Merv and Nishapur, but also captive soldiers from the Khwarazmid empire, the Kipchaks, and even Bulgars from the lower Volga.

== Border war (1277–1278) ==
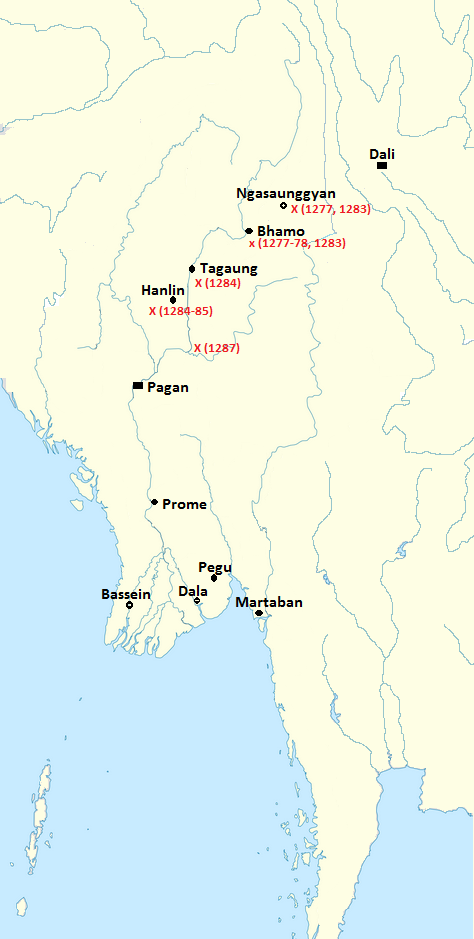
Mongol invasions 1277–1287

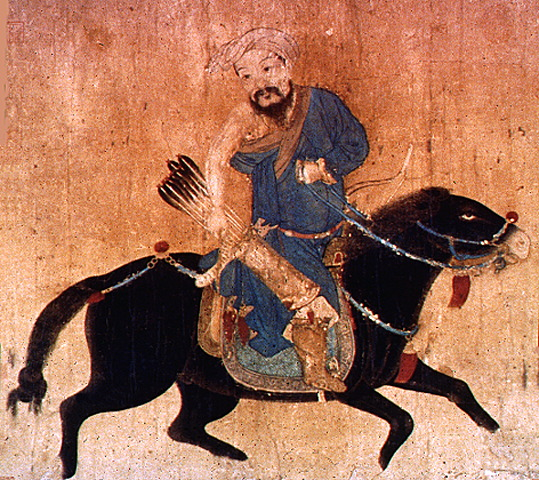
Mongol mounted archer

What followed was a border war in 1277–1278. It was reported mainly in the Yuan dynasty chronicle and the travelogue of Marco Polo. (Note: (Harvey 1925: 65): Marco Polo, who served a Privy Councillor on the Emperor's staff, claimed to have witnessed the war but he "doubtless heard the tale from the officers who took part in the action.") Although the Burmese chronicles have no record of the border war, a 1278 Burmese inscription mentions the army's defeat at Ngasaunggyan. The Mongol accounts of the border war contain certain errors of location and numbers although the overall narrative is probably accurate. (Note: (Haw 2006: 104): The Yuan account of the war seems "far-fetched". (Turnbull 2003: 84): Marco Polo's description of the battle in 1277 "actually compresses a decade of history into one episode, and contains certain errors of location and numbers, but the overall impression of what happened is probably quite accurate." (Harvey 1925: 336): Regarding the battle of Ngasaunggyan, "Marco Polo catches the spirit of it all but his details need modification.")

=== Battle of Ngasaunggyan ===
According to the Yuan dynasty chronicle and Marco Polo's accounts, a Burmese army "invaded" the Mongol territory of Gold Teeth, and was defeated by the Mongol army in April 1277. The battle took place either at the Vochang valley (in present-day Baoshan Prefecture) or 110 km southwest at Kanngai (present-day Yingjiang, Dehong Prefecture), which the Burmese called Ngasaunggyan. (Note: Some historians such as Stephen Haw (Haw 2006: 104) accept Marco Polo's account. But others such as G.E. Harvey (Harvey 1925: 336–337) believe the Burmese army never made it to Vochang, and was stopped en route at Ngasaunggyan, which according to Harvey was about 110 km southwest of Vochang.)

The Yuan Chronicle reports that only 700 men defeated a Burmese army of 40,000 to 50,000 with 10,000 horses and 800 elephants. It also reports that only one Mongol was killed while trying to catch an elephant. According to Marco Polo, the Mongol army consisted of 12,000 mounted archers, and the Burmese army numbered 60,000 men with 2,000 elephants, "on each of which was set a tower of timber, well-framed and strong, and carrying from 12 to 16 well-armed fighting men." Even then, the 40,000 to 60,000 figures of the Burmese army strength were likely eye estimates and may still be too high; the Mongols may have erred "on the side of generosity" not to "diminish their glory in defeating superior numbers."

According to Marco Polo's account, in the early stages of the battle, the Turkish and Mongol horsemen "took such fright at the sight of the elephants that they would not be got to face the foe, but always swerved and turned back," while the Burmese forces pressed on. But the Mongol commander Huthukh (Note: (Harvey 1925: 336): Marco Polo's account that Nasr al-Din commanded the Mongol army at the battle of Ngasaunggyan is incorrect. Nasr al-Din led the raid on Kaungsin in the following dry-season. According to (Yule 1874: 87), the initial 1277 expedition was led by the Commandant of Dali-fu, Huthukh, which may refer to Kutuka.) did not panic; he ordered his troops to dismount, and from the cover of the nearby treelines, aim their bows directly at the advancing elephants. The Mongol archers' arrows threw the animals into such pain that they fled.

=== Raid of Kaungsin ===
The Mongol army pressed on after the monsoon season. In the following dry season of 1277–1278, c. December 1277, a Mongol army of 3,800 men led by Nasr al-Din, son of Gov. Sayyid Ajjal, advanced to Kaungsin, which defended the Bhamo Pass. They occupied the fort and destroyed a large number of abandoned stockades. But they found the heat excessive and returned.

== Interlude (1278–1283) ==
Despite the Mongol military success, the control of the borderlands remained contested. Pagan did not relinquish its claim to the frontier regions, and the Burmese, apparently taking advantage of Mongol preoccupations elsewhere, rebuilt their forts at Kaungsin and Ngasaunggyan later in 1278, posting permanent garrisons commanded by Einda Pyissi. But their control was short-lived. The Great Khan's attention turned to Southeast Asia once more in 1281. He had mixed success: his vaunted forces finished off the last of the Song in 1279 but had again failed to take Japan in 1281. That year, the Mongol emperor sent another mission to Pagan, demanding tribute yet again. The Burmese king was to send his ten senior ministers accompanied by one thousand cavalry officers to the emperor's court. (With Champa, the emperor summoned the king of Champa himself to Beijing.)

At Pagan, Narathihapate deliberated with his court for an appropriate response but ultimately refused to submit. The Burmese court may have been counting on another limited border war but the emperor now ordered an invasion of northern Burma. He also ordered an invasion of Champa, whose king too had refused to submit.

Throughout 1282, the Mongol command made preparations for the upcoming invasions of Champa and northern Burma. The objective of the Burma campaign was to take over northern Burma but no further; the emperor did not sanction an attack on Pagan itself. At least one army consisted of 14,000 men of the erstwhile Khwarezmid Empire under the command of Yalu Beg was sent to Yunnan to reinforce the Burma invasion force, which again was made up of Turks and other central Asians. On the Burmese side, the king managed to raise an army although given his low standing with his vassals, he probably could not have raised a large one. By mid-1283, a Burmese army led by generals Ananda Pyissi and Yanda Pyissi was deployed at a fort at Ngasaunggyan.

== Invasion (1283–1285) ==
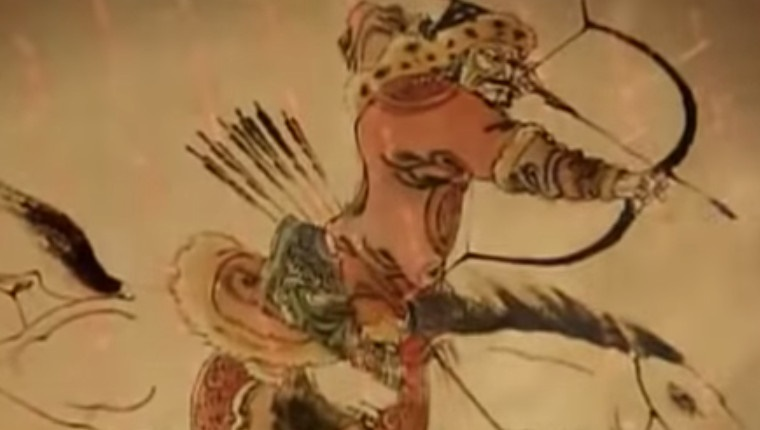
Mongol warrior on horseback, preparing a mounted archery shot.

=== Battle of Ngasaunggyan (1283) ===
The invasion began on 22 September 1283. Prince Sangqudar was the commander-in-chief of the invasion force; his deputies were Vice Governor Taipn, and commander Yagan Tegin. The Mongol armies marched to the border in two columns. One column advanced along the Taping River using over 200 boats; the other proceeded by land and joined the first column at the Burmese fort at Ngasaunggyan. The Burmese chronicles report an overwhelming number of Mongol forces laying siege to the fort although their numbers are greatly exaggerated. (The chronicles say that the Burmese army numbered 400,000 men while the Mongol army numbered 20 million men and 6 million horses.) The Burmese withstood the siege for over two months but the fort fell on 3 December 1283.

=== Invasion of northern Burma ===
The defeat at Ngasaunggyan broke the back of Burmese defenses. The Burmese army lost several thousand men as well as senior commanders. Kaungsin, the next fort in line, fell just six days later on 9 December 1283. The Mongol sources say that the Burmese lost 10,000 men at Kaungsin. The Mongol armies pushed farther south into the Irrawaddy valley. They took the ancient Burmese capital of Tagaung, about 380 km north of Pagan on 5 February 1284. There, the invaders paused their advance. They "found the heat of the searing Irrawaddy valley excessive", and evacuated Tagaung, allowing the Burmese to return to Tagaung on 10 May 1284. But the Mongol army renewed their offensive in the following dry season. They retook Tagaung, and defeated another Burmese stand south of Tagaung, probably near Hanlin, on 26 January 1285, opening the way to Pagan, about 270 km south. After the defeat, the king panicked, and fled to Lower Burma. The evacuation proved premature. The Mongol forces did not advance on Pagan as it was not part of their invasion plan.

The country fell into chaos. In Lower Burma, the king found himself isolated, let alone plan a counterattack. Although the king's three sons ruled the nearby regions (Bassein (Pathein), Prome (Pyay), and Dala-Twante), the king did not trust any of them, and he and his court settled at Hlegya, west of Prome. Without the full support of his sons, the presence of the king and his small army impressed no one. A usurper named Wareru seized the southern port city of Martaban (Mottama) by killing its Pagan-appointed governor. Gov. Akhamaman of Pegu also revolted; the king managed to send two small expeditions to Pegu but they both failed. Now, the entire eastern half of Lower Burma (Pegu and Martaban) was in open revolt.

== Peace negotiations (1285–1287) ==
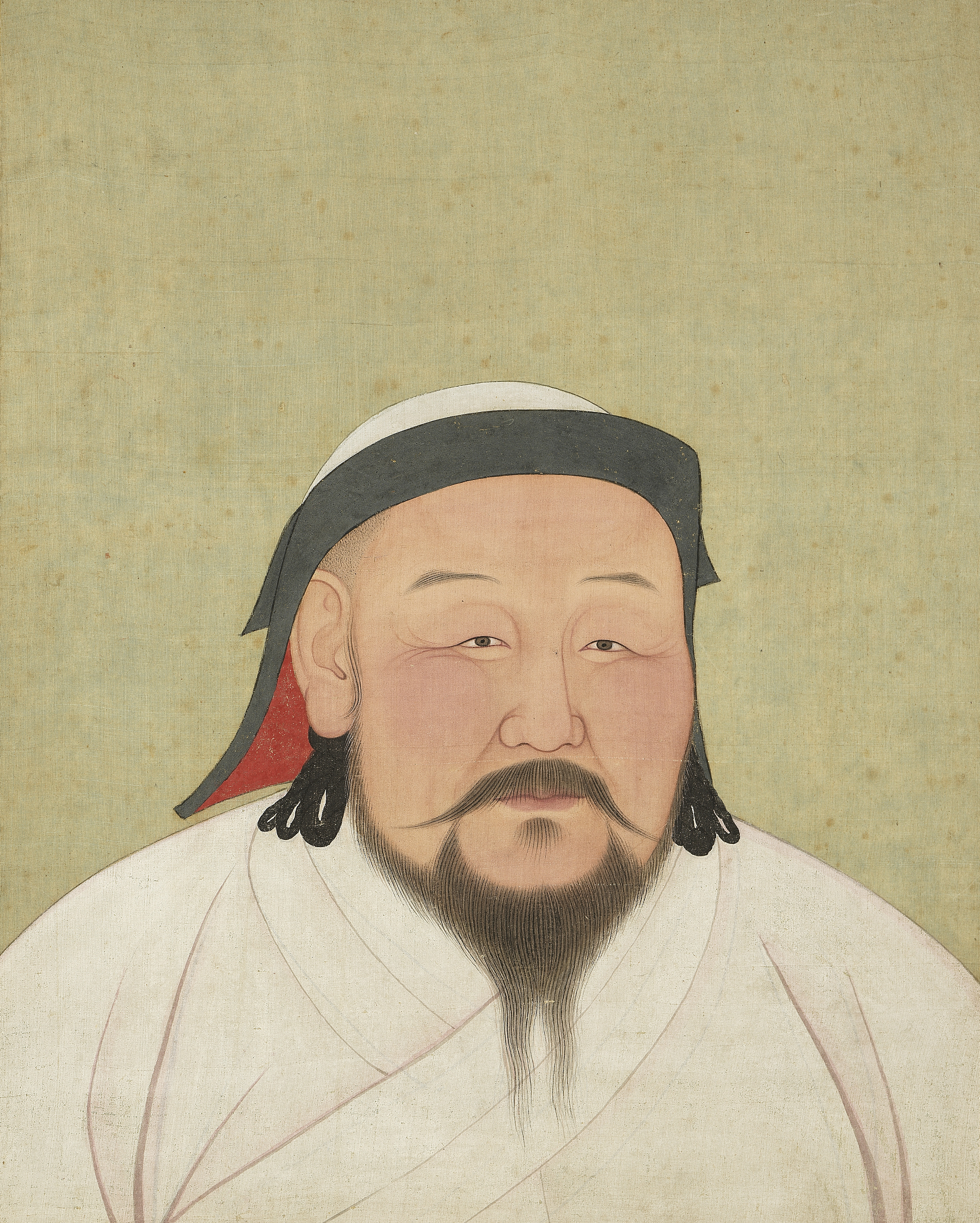
Kublai Khan, founder and first emperor of the Yuan dynasty

=== Ceasefire ===
Given his precarious position, Narathihapate decided to buy time and sue for peace with the Mongols. In November/December 1285, the king ordered his generals Ananda Pyissi and Maha Bo to enter into ceasefire negotiations. (Note: Burmese chronicles (Hmannan Vol. 1 2003: 354) say that Ananda Pyissi died in action during the 1283–1284 campaign. Per (Than Tun 1964: 136), Ananda Pyissi was still alive in 1285 according to a contemporary inscription. The general who died may have been Ananda Pyissi's brother Yanda Pyissi since Gen. Maha Bo presumably had become the second in command in 1285.) The Mongol commanders at Hanlin, who had organized northern Burma as a protectorate named Zhengmian (Chinese: 征緬; Wade–Giles: Cheng-Mien), (Note: Wade-Giles transcription per (Than Tun 1959: 121); (Htin Aung 1967: 70) gives it as Chiang-Mien, "the Burmese province".) agreed to a ceasefire but insisted on a full submission. They repeated their 1281 demand that the Burmese king send a formal delegation to the emperor. The two sides had reached a tentative agreement by 3 March 1286, (Note: jiachen day of the 2nd month of the 23rd year of the Zhiyuan reign = 3 March 1286) which calls for a full submission of the Pagan Empire, and central Burma to be organized as the province of Mianzhong (Chinese: 緬中; Wade–Giles: Mien-Chung). After a long deliberation, the king agreed to submit but wanted the Mongol troops to withdraw. In June 1286, he sent an embassy led by Shin Ditha Pamauk, a learned monk, to the emperor's court.

=== Treaty of Beijing ===
In January 1287, the embassy arrived at Beijing and was received by the Yuan emperor. The Burmese delegation formally acknowledged Mongol suzerainty of their kingdom and agreed to pay annual tribute tied to the agricultural output of the country. (Indeed, the tribute was no longer nominal.) In exchange, the emperor agreed to withdraw his troops. For the emperor, the Burma campaign was the only bright spot; his other Southeast Asian expeditions had gone badly. He did not want to invest more troops to pacify the rest of the kingdom. He preferred a vassal ruler. The Burmese embassy arrived back at Hlegya in May 1287, and reported the terms to the king.

=== Breakdown ===
But the agreement broke down a month later. In late June, the defeated king and his small retinue left their temporary capital for Pagan. But on 1 July 1287, King Narathihapate was captured en route and assassinated by his second son Thihathu, the Viceroy of Prome. Anarchy ensued. Each region in the country that had not revolted broke away. No successor to Narathihapate, who could honor and enforce the terms of the treaty of Beijing, emerged. Indeed, a king would not emerge until May 1289.

== Mongol last push for Pagan (1287) ==
Given the chaos, the governor of Yunnan ignored the imperial orders of evacuation. The Mongol army commanded by Prince Ye-sin Timour, a grandson of the emperor, marched south toward Pagan. According to mainstream traditional (colonial-era) scholarship, the Mongol army ignored the imperial orders to evacuate; fought its way down to Pagan with the loss of 7000 men; occupied the city; and sent out detachments to receive homage, one of which reached south of Prome. But not all colonial period scholars agreed with the assessment as none of the contemporary Mongol/Chinese records specifically mentioned the conquest of Pagan or the temporary completeness of the conquest.

Recent research shows that the Mongol forces most probably never reached Pagan. They were held at bay by the Burmese defenses led by commanders Athinkhaya, Yazathingyan and Thihathu, and probably never got closer than 160 km north of Pagan. (An inscription dated 16 February 1293 by the three brothers claimed that they defeated the Mongol army.) Even if the Mongols did reach Pagan, the damage they inflicted was probably minimal. At any rate, the Mongol army suffered heavy casualties, and retreated north to Tagaung. They remained there as the treaty was now void.

== Aftermath ==
The disintegration of the Pagan Empire was now complete. But the Mongols refused to fill in the power vacuum they had created. They would send no more expeditions to restore order. The emperor apparently had no interest in committing troops that would be required to pacify the fragmented country. Indeed, his real aim all along may have been "to keep the entire region of Southeast Asia broken and fragmented." It would be another two years until one of Narathihapate's sons, Kyawswa, emerged as king of Pagan in May 1289. But the new "king" controlled just a small area around the capital, and had no real army. The real power in central Burma now rested with the three commander brothers.

The uneasy arrangement would persist until 1297. The Mongols continued to occupy northern Burma to Tagaung as the province of Zhengmian (Cheng-Mien) but ended the fictional central Burma province of Mianzhong on 18 August 1290. Meanwhile, the power struggle in central Burma continued with the three brothers blatantly consolidating support. To check their rising power, Kyawswa submitted to the Mongols in January 1297, and was recognized by the Yuan emperor Temür Khan as King of Pagan on 20 March 1297. The emperor also gave Chinese titles to the brothers as subordinates of Kyawswa. The brothers resented the new arrangement as it directly reduced their power. On 17 December 1297, the three brothers overthrew Kyawswa, and founded the Myinsaing Kingdom. The dethronement forced the Mongol government to intervene again, leading to the second Mongol invasion of Burma (1300–1301). The invasion failed. Two years later, on 4 April 1303, the Mongols abolished the province of Zhengmian (Cheng-Mien), evacuated Tagaung, and returned to Yunnan.

== Legacy ==
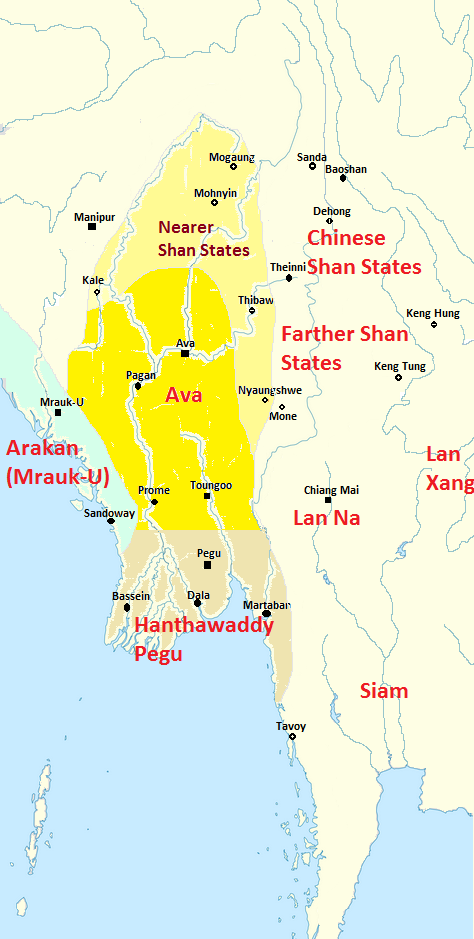
Burma c. 1450 with Ava at its peak, nearer Shan states paid tribute to Ava

The war was one of several near simultaneous wars waged by the Mongol Empire in the late 13th century. Though it was never more than a minor frontier war to the Mongols, the war set off a series of enduring developments in Burma. The invasions ushered in a period of political fragmentation, and the rise of Tai-Shan states throughout mainland Southeast Asia.

=== Age of political fragmentation ===
The immediate result of the war was the collapse of the Pagan Empire. However, the war merely accelerated the collapse but did not cause it. Pagan's disintegration was "in fact more prolonged and agonized." The kingdom had been in long gradual decline since the early 13th century. Had Pagan possessed a stronger central government, the collapse could have been temporary, and the country "could have risen again". But the dynasty could not recover, and because the Mongols refused to fill the power vacuum, no viable center emerged in the immediate aftermath. As a result, several minor states fought it out for supremacy for the better part of the 14th century. It was only in the late 14th century that two relatively strong powers emerged in the Irrawaddy basin, restoring some semblance of normalcy. (Note: King Thado Minbya of Ava reunified central Burma in 1364–1367. King Razadarit of Pegu unified Lower Burma's three Mon-speaking provinces in 1388–1389.) The vast region surrounding the Irrawaddy valley would continue to be made up of several small Tai-Shan states well into the 16th century.

=== Rise of Tai-Shan states ===
Perhaps the most enduring legacy of the Mongol invasions was the emergence of Tai-Shan states in mainland Southeast Asia. The Tai-Shan people who came down with the Mongol invasions stayed. By the early 14th century, several Tai-Shan states had come to dominate a vast region from present-day Assam to present-day northern and eastern Myanmar to northern and central Thailand and Laos. Their rise was encouraged by the Mongols, who viewed the states as a useful buffer between Yunnan and the rest of Southeast Asia. The Mongols, who were still trying to incorporate Yunnan into the central administration, were unwilling or unable to make necessary sustained investments to bring the vast regions south of Yunnan into the fold. (The integration of Yunnan itself into "China proper" was to take several more centuries, and continues to today.) As such, from the newly formed Tai-Shan states in western and central Southeast Asia to Dai Viet and Champa in eastern Southeast Asia, the Mongols elected to receive nominal tribute. Though the rulers of these states were technically governors of the Yuan government, they were the native chieftains, "who would have ruled there in any case, and they did as they pleased."

=== Arrival of China on the Burmese border ===
The war also marked the arrival of China at the doorstep of Burma. The old Dali Kingdom, known to the Burmese as Gandalarit (ဂန္တလရာဇ်, after Gandhara Raj) was now a Mongol Chinese province. (The Burmese now called the new powers at Yunnan "Taruk" after the Turkic-speaking soldiers of Yunnan. Over the years, the term Taruk came to be used to refer to the Han Chinese. Today, King Narathihapate is remembered as Taruk-Pye Min, ("the King who fled from the Taruk [Chinese]).) From a geopolitical standpoint, the Mongol–Chinese presence in Yunnan pushed the Shan migrations in the direction of Burma (and parts of the Khmer Empire). The raids by various Shan states into Upper Burma would continue until the mid-16th century.

=== Modern relations ===
During the official visit by the Mongolian President Tsakhiagiin Elbegdorj to Myanmar in November 2013, Aung San Suu Kyi, the chairwoman of the National League for Democracy, said this was the first ever Mongol mission since the Mongols came 730 years earlier.

== See also ==
- Second Mongol invasion of Burma (1300–1301)
- Sino-Burmese War
