= Htilominlo =

Zeya Theinkha Uzana Htilominlo ဇေယျသိင်္ခ ဥဇနာ ထီးလိုမင်းလို
- King of Pagan

King of Burma
- Reign: 18 August 1211 – 19 July 1235
- Predecessor: Narapatisithu
- Successor: Kyaswa (or Naratheinga Uzana)
- Chief Minister and Commander-in-Chief: Ananda Thura
- Born: 4 February 1175; Tuesday, 14th waxing of Tabaung 536 ME; Pagan (Bagan)
- Died: 19 July 1235 (aged 60); Thursday, 4th waxing of Wagaung 597 ME; Pagan
- Consort: Pwadawgyi; Myauk Pyinthe; Saw Mi Pyan; Eindawthe
- Issue: Naratheinga Uzana; Kyaswa; Theinpatei; Taya Mun
- House: Bagan
- Father: Sithu II
- Mother: Saw Mya Kan
- Religion: Theravada Buddhism

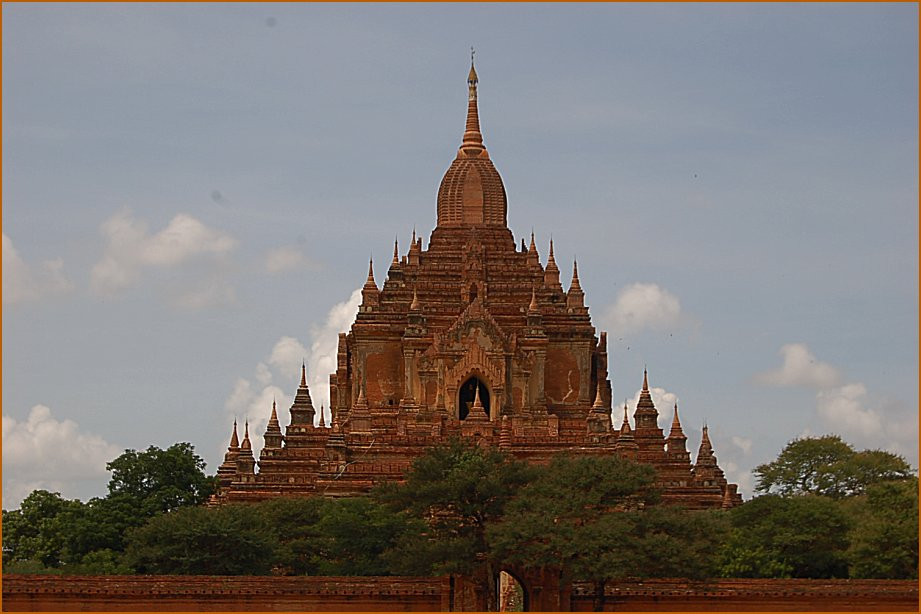

Htilominlo (Burmese: ထီးလိုမင်းလို, pronounced [tʰílò mɪ́ɰ̃lò], lit. "Throne-willing"; 1175 – 1235), also called Nadaungmya (နားတောင်းများ, ("Earrings") or Zeya Theinkha Uzana (ဇေယျသိင်္ခဥဇနာ), was king of the Pagan dynasty of Burma (Myanmar) from 1211 to 1235. His 24-year reign marked the beginning of the gradual decline of Pagan dynasty. It was the first to see the impact of over a century of continuous growth of tax-free religious wealth, which had greatly reduced the potential tax base. Htilominlo was the last of the temple builders although most of his temples were in remote lands outside the Pagan region, reflecting the deteriorating state of royal treasury.

All the royal chronicles say he was succeeded by his son Kyaswa, but two contemporary inscriptions indicate that another son of his, Naratheinga Uzana, was at least acting as the regent towards the end of his reign.

== Early life ==
Htilominlo was born to King Sithu II and his queen Saw Mya Kan. Chronicles do not agree on the birth, death and reign dates. According to the Zatadawbon Yazawin chronicle, considered the most accurate chronicle for the Pagan period, he was born on 4 February 1175. (Note: Zatadawbon Yazawin's royal horoscopes section (Zata 1960: 67) says he was born on Thursday, 13th nekkhat (14th waxing) of the 12th month (Tabaung) of 534 ME (Monday, 26 February 1173) and died at age 58 (1231). But 534 ME is certainly a typographical error, and the year should be 536 for the following reasons: (1) the next horoscope (of King Kyaswa) says King Kyaswa ascended the throne in 1234 (not 1231); (2) Zata's own list of monarchs section (Zata 1960: 40) says he was born in year 536 on a Tuesday; (3) 14th waxing of Tabaung 536 ME gives Tuesday, 4 February 1175.) The table below lists the dates given by the four main chronicles.

Chronicles	Birth–Death	Age	Reign	Length of reign
Zatadawbon Yazawin (List of monarchs section)	1175–1234	59	1210–1234	24
Zatadawbon Yazawin (Royal horoscopes section)	26 February 1173 [sic]–1234	58	1209 [sic]–1234	22
Maha Yazawin	1178–1219	41	1197–1219	22
Yazawin Thit and Hmannan Yazawin	1175–1234	59	1211–1234	23

== Reign ==
The king, a devout Buddhist and a scholar, gave up the command of the army, and left the day-to-day affairs to a privy council consisted of ministers, the forebear of the Hluttaw, or the supreme administrative body of government. He focused his energies on religion and temple-building. He completed the majestic Gawdawpalin Temple, begun by his father Narapatisithu, built the Mahabodhi, a replica of the Buddhagaya temple, and the Htilominlo Temple, named after himself.

His reign was largely peaceful, except for one rebellion north of Tagaung, which was put down by his commander in chief. By all accounts, he was popular with the people. Still, he never really governed, and was especially oblivious to the growing problem of reduced tax base brought about by the continuous growth of tax-free religious holdings. To be sure, his predecessors did not face the problem, and his successors also continued to ignore the problem, where by the 1280s, two-thirds of Upper Burma's cultivable land had been alienated to the religion. Thus the throne also lost resources necessary to retain the loyalty of courtiers and military servicemen, inviting a vicious circle of internal disorders and external challenges by Mons, Mongols and Shans.

== Bibliography ==
- Coedès, George (1968). Walter F. Vella (ed.). The Indianized States of Southeast Asia. trans.Susan Brown Cowing. University of Hawaii Press. ISBN 978-0-8248-0368-1.
- Harvey, G. E. (1925). History of Burma: From the Earliest Times to 10 March 1824. London: Frank Cass & Co. Ltd.
- Htin Aung, Maung (1967). A History of Burma. New York and London: Cambridge University Press.
- Kala, U (1724). Maha Yazawin (in Burmese). Vol. 1–3 (2006, 4th printing ed.). Yangon: Ya-Pyei Publishing.
- Lieberman, Victor B. (2003). Strange Parallels: Southeast Asia in Global Context, c. 800–1830, volume 1, Integration on the Mainland. Cambridge University Press. ISBN 978-0-521-80496-7.
- Pe, Maung Tin; Luce, G.H. The Glass Palace Chronicle of the Kings of Burma (1960 ed.). Rangoon University Press.
- Royal Historians of Burma (c. 1680). U Hla Tin (Hla Thamein) (ed.). Zatadawbon Yazawin (1960 ed.). Historical Research Directorate of the Union of Burma.
- Royal Historical Commission of Burma (1832). Hmannan Yazawin (in Burmese). Vol. 1–3 (2003 ed.). Yangon: Ministry of Information, Myanmar.
- Tarling, Nicholas (1992). The Cambridge History of Southeast Asia (1993 ed.). Cambridge University Press. ISBN 9780521355056.
- Than Tun (1964). Studies in Burmese History (in Burmese). Vol. 1. Yangon: Maha Dagon.

Htilominlo Pagan Dynasty Born: 4 February 1175 Died: 19 July 1235
Regnal titles
Preceded by Sithu II	King of Burma; 1211–1235	Succeeded by Kyaswa
Royal titles
Preceded by Sithu II	Heir to the Burmese Throne; 1211	Succeeded by Naratheinga Uzana
