= Kyaswa =

Kyaswa ကျစွာ
- King of Pagan
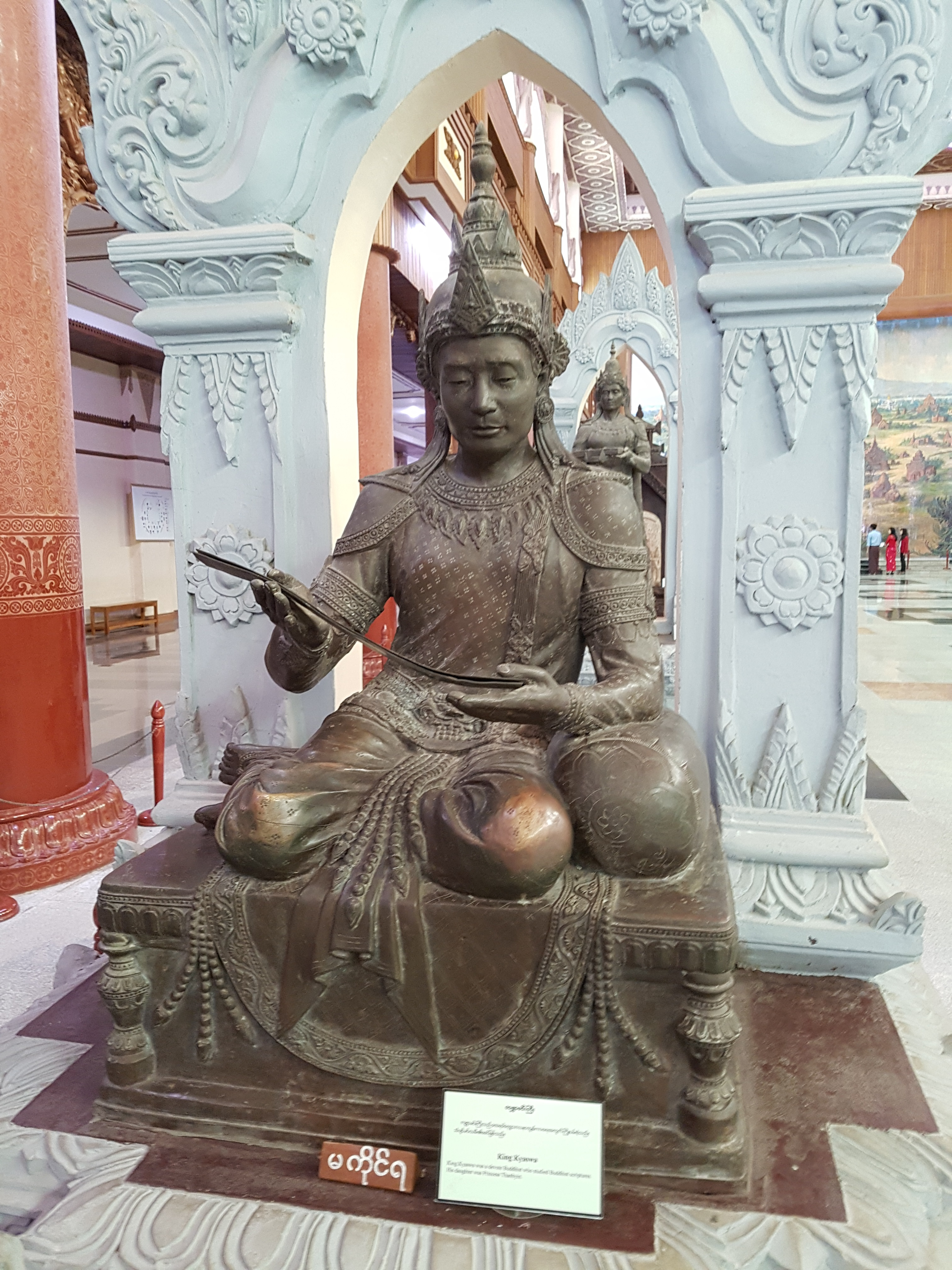

King of Burma
- Reign: 19 July 1235 – c. May 1251
- Predecessor: Htilominlo (or Naratheinga Uzana)
- Successor: Uzana
- Chief Minister: Yazathingyan
- Born: 4 May 1198; Monday, 13th waning of Kason 560 ME; Pagan (Bagan)
- Died: c. May 1251 (aged ~53) c. Nayon 613 ME; Pagan
- Consort: Yaza Dewi
- Issue: Uzana (Note: Chronicles (Hmannan Vol. 1 2003: 334) say Uzana was a son of Kyaswa. But (Than Tun 1964: 134) citing inscriptional evidence says that Uzana was a son of Naratheinkha Uzana, an elder brother of Kyaswa, meaning Uzana was a nephew of Kyaswa.); Thonlula; Saw Khin Htut
Regnal name
- Śrī Tribhuvanāditya Pavarapaṇḍita Dhammarāja
- House: Pagan
- Father: Htilominlo
- Mother: Eindawthe
- Religion: Theravada Buddhism

Kyaswa (Burmese: ကျစွာ, pronounced [tɕa̰zwà]; 1198–1251) was the king of the Pagan dynasty of Burma (Myanmar) from 1235 to 1251. Kyaswa succeeded his father Htilominlo and was even more devout. Kyaswa's reign like his father's was largely peaceful but the depletion of the royal treasury due to large tax-free religious landholdings became more pronounced. The royal treasury was so depleted that Kyaswa had trouble completing a temple. The empire founded by Anawrahta over two centuries earlier was still peaceful but already on its last legs, unprepared for the internal disorders and external forces that were to come.

== Early life ==
Kyaswa was born to Prince Zeya Theinkha and his wife Eindawthe. An inscription donated by his maternal aunt (younger sister of his mother) states that Kyaswa was born on Monday, 4 May 1198 at 4 o'clock in the morning. The date is two weeks later than 20 April 1198, given by the Zatadawbon Yazawin chronicle.

The table below lists the dates given by the four main chronicles.

Chronicles	Birth–Death	Age	Reign	Length of reign
Zatadawbon Yazawin (List of monarchs section)	1197–1249	52 (Note: (Zata 1960: 40) says he died in 35th year but it is clearly a typographical error. It should be: he died in his 53rd year (at age 52) since it also says his son Uzana died 5 years later at age 40.)	1234–1249	15
Zatadawbon Yazawin (Horoscopes section)	20 April 1198 – 1251	53	1234–1251	17
Maha Yazawin	1200–1234	34	1219–1234	15
Yazawin Thit and Hmannan Yazawin	1194–1250	56	1234–1250	16

== Reign ==
Kyaswa assumed the regnal name "Śrī Tribhuvanāditya Pavarapaṇḍita Dhammarāja" (ၐြီတြိဘုဝနာဒိတျပဝရပဏ္ဍိတဓမ္မရာဇ). Kyaswa's reign, like his father's, was largely peaceful but the depletion of the royal treasury due to large tax-free religious landholdings became more pronounced. The royal treasury was so depleted that Kyaswa had trouble completing a temple. The devout king, unlike predecessors before him, did try to address the issue by reclaiming some of religious land from forest-dwelling monks. However public opinion against any seizure of monastic land forced him to return the land. Frustrated, the king left the administration of the kingdom to his son and his deputies, and spent his time composing religious writings, and giving his patronage only orthodox (Theravada) sects. The forest-dwelling monks neither needed his patronage nor feared his authority. Toward the end of his reign, forest-dwellers were openly offering meat and liquor to their devotees.

The king devoted to scholarship and promoting the dhamma with humanitarian policies. Unlike other Pagan kings, he would not resort to forced labor to build his temples. His Pyathada Temple in Pagan is much smaller than many temples built by his predecessors. In 1249, he issued a series of royal edicts (dated 22 April, 1 May and 6 May 1249) to be put up, carved on stone, in every village of more than 50 houses in the empire:

Kings of the past punished thieves by divers torture, starting with impaling. I desire no such destruction. I consider all my beings as my children, and with compassion to all I speak these words...

== Death ==
The king died sometime between 1249 and 1251, according to the main chronicles. (Note: Based on his edicts of May 1249 per (Than Tun 1964: 133), he was still alive as of 6 May 1249.) But since his son Uzana died in May 1256 after having reigned for 5 years, Kyaswa most probably died in early 1251 as reported by Zatadawbon Yazawin's horoscopes section. Scholarship provisionally accepts 1251 as the year of his death.

== Bibliography ==
- Coedès, George (1968). Walter F. Vella (ed.). The Indianized States of Southeast Asia. trans.Susan Brown Cowing. University of Hawaii Press. ISBN 978-0-8248-0368-1.
- Harvey, G. E. (1925). History of Burma: From the Earliest Times to 10 March 1824. London: Frank Cass & Co. Ltd.
- Htin Aung, Maung (1967). A History of Burma. New York and London: Cambridge University Press.
- Kala, U (2006) [1724]. Maha Yazawin (in Burmese). Vol. 1–3 (4th printing ed.). Yangon: Ya-Pyei Publishing.
- Maha Sithu (2012) [1798]. Kyaw Win; Thein Hlaing (eds.). Yazawin Thit (in Burmese). Vol. 1–3 (2nd ed.). Yangon: Ya-Pyei Publishing.
- Pe Maung Tin; Luce, G.H. (1923). The Glass Palace Chronicle of the Kings of Burma (1960 ed.). Rangoon University Press.
- Royal Historians of Burma (1960) [c. 1680]. U Hla Tin (Hla Thamein) (ed.). Zatadawbon Yazawin (in Burmese). Historical Research Directorate of the Union of Burma.
- Royal Historical Commission of Burma (2003) [1832]. Hmannan Yazawin (in Burmese). Vol. 1–3. Yangon: Ministry of Information, Myanmar.
- Strachan, Paul (1990). Imperial Pagan: art and architecture of Burma. University of Hawaii Press. ISBN 9780824813253.
- Tarling, Nicholas (1992). The Cambridge History of Southeast Asia (1993 ed.). Cambridge University Press. ISBN 9780521355056.
- Than Tun (1964). Studies in Burmese History (in Burmese). Vol. 1. Yangon: Maha Dagon.

Kyaswa Pagan Dynasty Born: 4 May 1198 Died: c. May 1251
Regnal titles
Preceded by Htilominlo	King of Burma; 1235–1251	Succeeded by Uzana
Royal titles
Preceded by Naratheinga Uzana	Heir to the Burmese Throne; 1231 – 1235	Succeeded by Uzana
