= Shin Panthagu =

- ရှင်ပန့်သကူ မထေရ်
- Title: Sayadaw

Personal life
- Born: 1083 Seinnyet?
- Died: c. 1174 (aged 91) Pagan
- Occupation: Buddhist monk

Religious life
- Religion: Buddhism
- School: Theravada
- Lineage: Conjeveram-Thaton

Senior posting
- Teacher: Shin Arahan
- Based in: Pagan
- Predecessor: Shin Arahan
- Successor: Shin Uttarajiva

The Venerable Shin Panthagu (Burmese: ရှင်ပန့်သကူ မထေရ် [ʃɪ̀ɰ̃ pa̰ɰ̃ðəɡù mətʰḛi]; 1083–c. 1174) was primate of Pagan Kingdom from 1115 to 1168. The Theravada Buddhist monk, son of the lord of Seinnyet, succeeded his teacher Shin Arahan as primate. For the next five decades, he was the chief religious adviser to King Alaungsithu, and helped advise many of Alaungsithu's religious deeds. The notable works were the repairs of the Buddhagaya Temple circa 1118, and the buildings of the Thatbyinnyu Temple, and the Shwegugyi Temple.

In 1168, he left Pagan (Bagan) for Ceylon in protest of Narathu who killed his father Alaungsithu and his elder brother Min Shin Saw to seize the throne. Shin Panthagu was especially disgusted by Narathu's treachery because Narathu used Panthagu in his scheme. By Narathu's urging, Shin Panthagu had gone and asked Min Shin Saw, whose troops were massed outside Pagan, to take the throne—with the explicit promise by Narathu that he would not harm Min Shin Saw. Narathu did not harm Min Shin Saw during their initial meet but poisoned his brother later that night.

Shin Panthagu returned to Pagan after Narapatisithu's accession to the throne in 1174. Shin Uttarajiva, a renowned Mon monk who had studied in Ceylon, was then the primate but Shin Panthagu was treated as the primate. The elderly Shin Panthagu died soon after.

== Bibliography ==
- Harvey, G. E. (1925). History of Burma: From the Earliest Times to 10 March 1824. London: Frank Cass & Co. Ltd.

Buddhist titles
Preceded by Shin Arahan	Primate of Pagan Kingdom; 1115–1168	Succeeded by Shin Uttarajiva
