= Saw Lat of Pagan =

Saw Lat စောလတ်

Queen of the Northern Palace
- Tenure: 1171 – 1190s?
- Predecessor: Myauk Pyinthe
- Successor: Myauk Pyinthe II (Sithu II)
- Born: c. 1140s Pagan (Bagan)
- Died: c. 1190s Pagan
- Spouse: Naratheinkha (c. 1160s–1174); Sithu II (1174–1190s?)
- Issue: one daughter (by Naratheinkha)
- House: Pagan
- Father: Yazathu
- Mother: Eindawthe
- Religion: Theravada Buddhism

Saw Lat (Burmese: စောလတ်, pronounced [sɔ́ laʔ]) was a queen consort of kings Naratheinkha and Sithu II of the Pagan Dynasty of Myanmar (Burma).

Royal chronicles do not agree on her ancestry. According to Maha Yazawin (1724), she was the younger of the two daughters of Yazathu and Eindawthe, niece of queens Taung Pyinthe and Khin U. But Yazawin Thit (1798) says she was a younger sister of Queen Min Aung Myat. Hmannan Yazawin (1832) sides with Maha Yazawin's account.

The queen had a daughter with Naratheinkha but their child died in the early 1170s during the reign of Naratheinkha. She died during the reign of Sithu II (after the death of Queen Weluwaddy in 1186), and was succeeded by another queen as the Queen of the Northern Palace.

== Bibliography ==
- Kala, U (1724). Maha Yazawin (in Burmese). Vol. 1–3 (2006, 4th printing ed.). Yangon: Ya-Pyei Publishing.
- Maha Sithu (2012) [1798]. Kyaw Win; Thein Hlaing (eds.). Yazawin Thit (in Burmese). Vol. 1–3 (2nd ed.). Yangon: Ya-Pyei Publishing.
- Royal Historical Commission of Burma (1832). Hmannan Yazawin (in Burmese). Vol. 1–3 (2003 ed.). Yangon: Ministry of Information, Myanmar.

Saw Lat of Pagan Pagan Kingdom Born: c. 1140s Died: c. 1190s
Royal titles
Preceded by Myauk Pyinthe (Narathu)	Queen of the Northern Palace; 1171 – 1190s?	Succeeded by Myauk Pyinthe II (Sithu II)
