= Naratheinkha =

King of Burma from 1171 to 1174

Naratheinkha နရသိင်္ခ
- King of Pagan

King of Burma
- Reign: c. February 1171 – c. May 1174
- Predecessor: Narathu
- Successor: Sithu II
- Chief Minister: Ananda Thuriya
- Born: 20 August 1141; Wednesday, 2nd waning of Tawthalin 503 ME; Pagan (Bagan)
- Died: c. May 1174 (aged 32); Pagan
- Consort: Min Aung Myat (1171–74); Saw Lat (1171–74); Saw Ahlwan (1171–74); Weluwaddy (1174)
Regnal name
- Śrī Tribhuvanāditya Pavaradhammarāja Dānapati
- House: Pagan
- Father: Narathu
- Mother: Myauk Pyinthe
- Religion: Theravada Buddhism

Naratheinkha (Burmese: နရသိင်္ခ, pronounced [nəɹa̰ θéiɰ̃kʰa̰]; 1141–1174) was a king of Pagan dynasty of Burma (Myanmar) from 1171 to 1174. He appointed his brother Narapati Sithu heir apparent and commander-in-chief. It was the first recorded instance in the history of the dynasty that the king had given up the command of the army. The king was assassinated by Aungzwa, one of Sithu's servants, after the king had raised one of Sithu's wives to queen.

According to G.H. Luce, there is no inscriptional evidence that Naratheinkha or any kings between 1165 and 1174 ever existed. Other historians such as Htin Aung do not agree with Luce's "conjecture".

== Early life ==
Naratheinkha was the eldest son of Narathu and Queen Myauk Pyinthe. Chronicles do not agree on his date of birth. (Note: Zatadawbon Yazawin's horoscope section (Zata 1960: 66) says he was born on Wednesday, 17th day of 6th month of 503 ME (Wednesday, 18 August 1141). But Yazawin Thit corrects the year to 496 ME. Also note that Hmannan Yazawin's, dating for this king is inconsistent with its own narrative. Hmannan like all other chronicles agrees that Naratheinkha was older than Sithu II who was born in 1138. However, it had Naratheinkha's birth year as 1140. The reason for the contradiction is that Hmannan for some reason suddenly switches to Maha Yazawin's dates for this king (34 years of age, 3 years of reign), while having followed Yazawin Thit's dating for nearly all of the prior Pagan kings.) The table below lists the dates given by the four main chronicles. Scholarship provisionally accepts the birth date as given in Zata's horoscopes section.

Chronicles	Birth–Death	Age	Reign	Length of reign
Zatadawbon Yazawin (List of monarchs section)	1142–1173	31	1170–1173	3
Zatadawbon Yazawin (Royal horoscopes section)	1141–1175	34	1170–1175	3
Maha Yazawin	1130–1164	34	1161–1164	3
Yazawin Thit	1134–1174	40	1171–1174	3
Hmannan Yazawin	1140–1174	34	1171–1174	3

Naratheinkha grew up at the court of King Sithu I. He was not even in the line of succession as the heir apparent was his uncle Min Shin Saw. When he reached manhood, he married his second cousin Min Aung Myat, who like him was a grandchild of King Sithu I in marriage ceremony presided by the king himself.

In 1167, Naratheinkha suddenly became the heir apparent to the throne after his father assassinated both Sithu I and Min Shin Saw.

== Reign ==
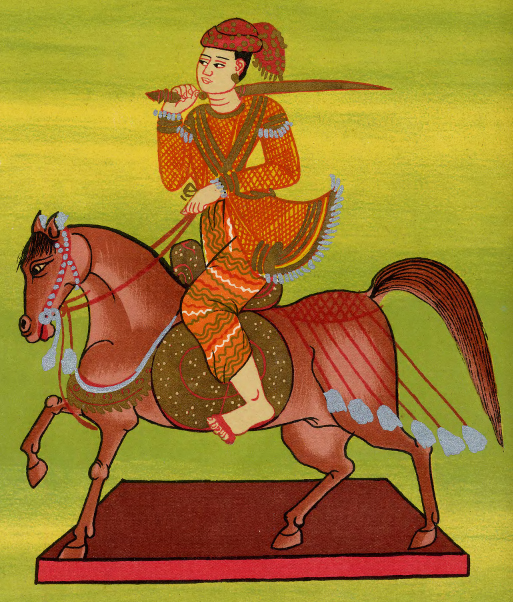
Commander Aung Zwa

Naratheinkha came to power in 1171 after his father was killed by the assassins sent by the king of Paṭṭikera, an Indian kingdom in the west. At accession, he made his brother Narapati Sithu the heir apparent and commander in chief. This was a significant change because it was the first recorded instance in the history of the dynasty that the king had given up the command of the army. Even a weak king like Saw Lu never gave up the command. (Note: (Htin Aung 1967: 50): Narathu may have been the first king to give up the command but it was never officially recorded in the chronicles.) He assumed the regnal name "Śrī Tribhuvanāditya Pavaradhammarāja Dānapati" (ၐြီတြိဘုဝနာဒိတျပဝရဓမ္မရာဇဒါနပတိ).

During his reign, a group of Burmese monks who had visited Sri Lanka, led by Shin Uttarajiva, returned to Bagan refusing to accept the validity of the Shin Arahan derived Kanchipuram-Thaton school, creating a schism. Naratheinkha supported the new school and sent numerous monks to be re-ordained in Sri Lanka, however, the old order and the schisms would last another two centuries.

The new king was popular but his downfall soon came, according to the chronicles, due to his interest in Weluwaddy, a queen of Sithu. The king actually passed over marrying her but regretted the decision later after his brother took her. In 1174, Naratheinkha made up an excuse to send Sithu to the front in the far north at Ngasaunggyan (present-day Yunnan) to suppress a supposed rebellion. When he had confirmed that Sithu's army was at a distant fort, the king raised his sister-in-law to queen.

On his way to the frontier, Sithu got hold of the news by a messenger on horseback. (Note: (Hmannan Vol. 1 2003: 314–315): In a case of killing the messenger, the messenger, Nga Pyei, was executed by Sithu, reportedly for the messenger having rested his horse and spent a night sleeping on the way there. When his anger subsided, Sithu regretted the decision and gave Nga Pyei a formal burial. He was made a nat (spirit) that governs the islet, the site of his burial, now called Shwe Pyei Shin Kyun.) Knowing he had been misled, Sithu then selected Aung Zwa, a commander from his army, to lead the effort to assassinate the king. Aung Zwa led a team of 80 soldiers, and sped down the river by boat without pause. At Pagan, the team infiltrated the palace, and Aung Zwa himself killed the king.

== Bibliography ==
- Coedès, George (1968). Walter F. Vella (ed.). The Indianized States of Southeast Asia. trans.Susan Brown Cowing. University of Hawaii Press. ISBN 978-0-8248-0368-1.
- Htin Aung, Maung (1967). A History of Burma. New York and London: Cambridge University Press.
- Htin Aung, Maung (1970). Burmese History before 1287: A Defence of the Chronicles. Oxford: The Asoka Society.
- Kala, U (1724). Maha Yazawin (in Burmese). Vol. 1–3 (2006, 4th printing ed.). Yangon: Ya-Pyei Publishing.
- Maha Sithu (2012) [1798]. Kyaw Win; Thein Hlaing (eds.). Yazawin Thit (in Burmese). Vol. 1–3 (2nd ed.). Yangon: Ya-Pyei Publishing.
- Royal Historians of Burma (c. 1680). U Hla Tin (Hla Thamein) (ed.). Zatadawbon Yazawin (1960 ed.). Historical Research Directorate of the Union of Burma.
- Royal Historical Commission of Burma (1832). Hmannan Yazawin (in Burmese). Vol. 1–3 (2003 ed.). Yangon: Ministry of Information, Myanmar.

Naratheinkha Pagan Dynasty Born: 20 August 1141 Died: c. May 1174
Regnal titles
Preceded by Narathu	King of Burma; 1171–1174	Succeeded by Sithu II
Royal titles
Preceded by Narathu	Heir to the Burmese Throne; 1167–1171	Succeeded by Sithu II
