= Shwekyimyin Pagoda =

Buddhist Pagoda in Mandalay, Myanmar

- ရွှေကျီးမြင်စေတီတော်
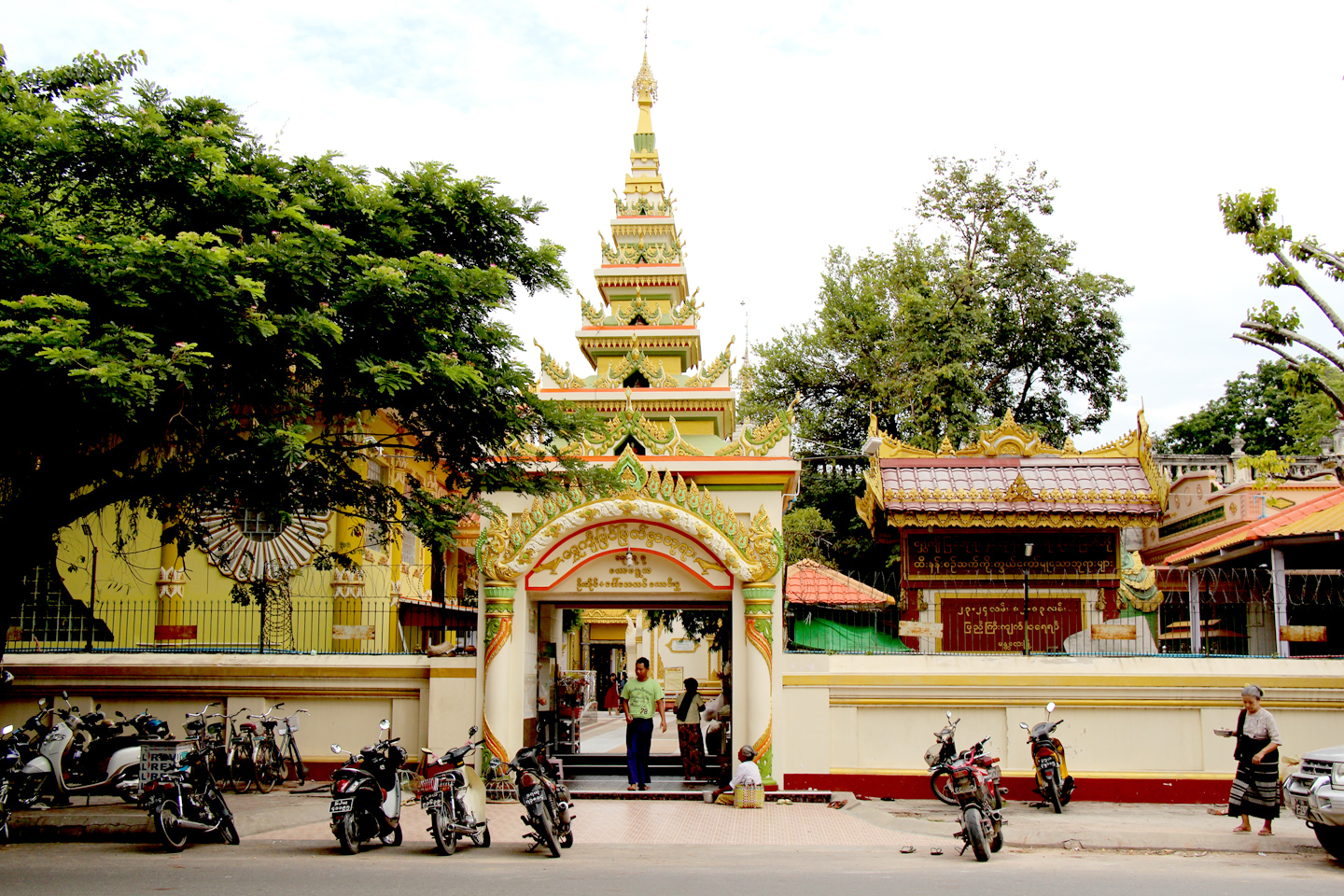
- Entrance to Shwekyimyin Pagoda

- Location within Myanmar

Religion
- Affiliation: Theravada Buddhism

Location
- Country: Mandalay, Mandalay Region, Burma
- Coordinates: 21.986627°N 96.080836°E

Architecture
- Founder: Min Shin Saw
- Completed: 1167; 859 years ago

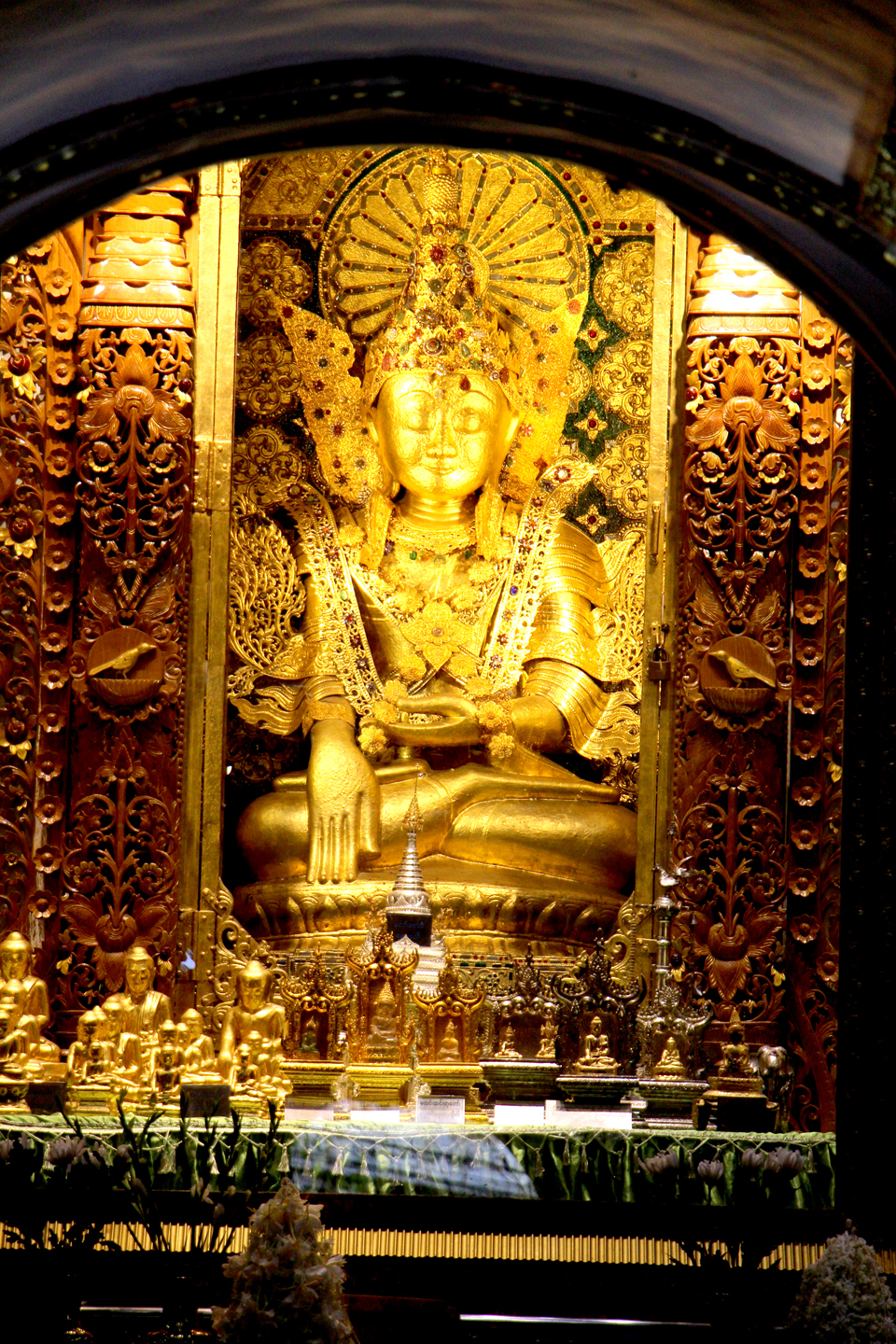
Principal image of the Buddha at the pagoda.

Shwekyimyin Pagoda (Burmese: ရွှေကျီးမြင်စေတီတော်) is a notable pagoda in Mandalay, Burma, located on 24th Street, between 82nd and 83rd Streets. It was built in 1167 by Min Shin Saw, a prince from Pagan, who had come to the shores of the Aungbinle lake to cultivate rice. In the early 1900s, in one of its chapels, 40 images of Buddha found in the Mandalay Palace at the time of the British occupation in 1885 are kept for safe custody. A pagoda was built in 1852 over the older one. It is known for the Shweilnbin, an image of Gautama Buddha that was originally placed in a pagoda built in Pagan by King Narapatisithu and subsequently moved to other royal capitals.
