= Ananda Thuriya =

12th-century Burmese minister and poet

- အနန္တ သူရိယ

Senior Minister
- In office 1167–1174
- Monarchs: Narathu (1167–71); Naratheinkha (1171–74)

Minister
- In office 1151–1167
- Monarch: Sithu I

Personal details
- Born: c. 1110s
- Died: 1174 Pagan (Bagan)

Ananda Thuriya (Burmese: အနန္တ သူရိယ, pronounced [ʔənàɴda̰ θùɹḭja̰]; also spelled Anantathuriya; d. 1174) was a senior minister to kings Sithu I, Narathu and Naratheinkha of the Pagan Dynasty of Myanmar. He is best remembered in Burmese history for the poem he wrote for King Sithu II, just a few minutes before his execution, titled The Law of Nature. The extant poem, likely a result of a 14th-century update, is considered to be the first known instance of poetry in Burmese as well as monarchical criticism.

== Brief ==
The future minister, whose personal name is lost to history, began his career as a royal attendant at the palace of King Sithu I (r. 1112–67) in Pagan (Bagan). Descended from a line of royal attendants, he attended to the children of Prince Narathu, including Naratheinkha and Sithu II. He was a tutor to Naratheinkha.

The attendant entered the upper echelons of power in 1151 when the king promoted him to serve as a royal adviser/minister (amat (အမတ်)), with the title of Ananda Thuriya. The appointment certainly was not a routine matter as ministers of the day were usually drawn from more distant branches of the royal family. Royal chronicles say that Crown Prince Min Shin Saw vigorously opposed the appointment because of the attendant's commoner origins. (Note: (Maha Yazawin Vol. 1 2006: 202), (Yazawin Thit Vol. 1 2012: 118–119) and (Hmannan Vol. 1 2003: 303): Sithu I permitted Ananda Thuriya to wear an attire reserved for senior princes; when the crown prince saw Ananda Thuriya in the princely attire, the prince forced the commoner to change the attire right away; and when the king heard of what happened, a heated argument began between the king and the crown prince, which eventually led to the exile of the crown prince to the north.) He may have also viewed Ananda Thuriya as too close to his younger brother and rival Narathu. At any rate, Min Shin Saw lost the power struggle, and was exiled.

In the following years, Narathu became the de facto heir-apparent, and Ananda Thuriya's career continued to rise alongside his patron's. He became a senior minister in 1167 after Narathu had seized the throne by assassinating both Sithu I and Min Shin Saw. Ananda Thuriya continued to serve in the role when Narathu's eldest son and his former pupil Naratheinkha became king in 1171. In 1174, Ananda Thuriya became ensnared in a power struggle between Naratheinkha and his younger brother Crown Prince Narapati. Chronicles say that the king tried to remove the crown prince because he coveted his brother's "exotically beautiful" consort Weluwaddy. The younger brother, who was commander-in-chief of the army, learned of the plan, and instead had the elder brother assassinated, and seized the throne.

The younger brother, now King Sithu II, considered Ananda Thuriya too close to his brother, and ordered the execution of the aged courtier. At the execution site, Ananda Thuriya wrote a four-stanza poem to be presented to the king, titled The Law of Nature, which was written only a few minutes before his execution. Sithu II pardoned the minister immediately after having read the poem. But it was too late: he was informed that the old minister had already been executed. Chronicles say that the king sobbed uncontrollably before everyone, and was filled with regret, reminiscing how he was raised by the late minister. The king now decreed that his death sentences from then on were to be carried out only after a cooling-off period of a month.

== The Law of Nature ==
The Law of Nature was written in the linka (လင်္ကာ, [lɪ̀ɴgà]) form, and consists of four stanzas. The minister is generally credited as the author of the poem but according to a recent analysis, the extant version of the poem was probably written, or at least updated in the 14th century by an unidentified poet. It is considered to be the first known instance of poetry in Burmese vernacular as well as monarchical criticism.

The following is the English translation by R.F. St. Andrew St. John.

Yes, he is one who, wealth attained,
Shall pass away and disappear;

'Tis, Nature's Law.

Within his golden palace hall,
Surrounded by his lords in state,

He sits serene.

But king's delights, eddies small
On ocean's face a moment seen,

Are but for life.

Should he show pity, and not slay,
But set me free, my liberty,

Is Karma's work.

Of mortals here the elements
Last not, but change and fall away;

It is the Law;

The sure result of supplicant acts
Or prayers, I wish not to transfer

To future lives:

T' escape this fate, past sins' result,
Is my desire. Calmly I'll wait.

My heart is firm.

Thee, gentle lord, I blameless hold,
Freely to thee, I pardon give,

'Tis not thy deed.

Danger and death are constant foes
And in this world must ever be:

It is the Law.

== Bibliography ==
- Aung-Thwin, Michael (1985). Pagan: The Origins of Modern Burma. Honolulu: University of Hawai'i Press. ISBN 0-8248-0960-2.
- Bagley, John H.; Ei, Kyaw (2009). Red peacocks: commentaries on Burmese socialist nationalism. Readworthy Publications. ISBN 9789380009209.
- Harvey, G. E. (1925). History of Burma: From the Earliest Times to 10 March 1824. London: Frank Cass & Co. Ltd.
- Kala, U (1724). Maha Yazawin (in Burmese). Vol. 1–3 (2006, 4th printing ed.). Yangon: Ya-Pyei Publishing.
- Maha Sithu (1798). Myint Swe; Kyaw Win; Thein Hlaing (eds.). Yazawin Thit (in Burmese). Vol. 1–3 (2012, 2nd printing ed.). Yangon: Ya-Pyei Publishing.
- Permanent Bureau of Afro-Asian Writers (1967). Lotus: Afro-Asian Writings. Vol. 1. Permanent Bureau of Afro-Asian Writers.
- Royal Historical Commission of Burma (1832). Hmannan Yazawin (in Burmese). Vol. 1–3 (2003 ed.). Yangon: Ministry of Information, Myanmar.
- Burma Translation Society (1975). Minister Ananda Thuriya (in Burmese). Vol. 14 (1 ed.). Yangon: Sarpay Beikman.
