= Shin Uttarajiva =

Thathanabaing of Burma during Pagan Dynasty

Shin Uttarajīva
- ရှင်ဥတ္တရဇီဝ
- Title: Sayadaw

Personal life
- Born: Dagon
- Died: c. 5 October 1191 c. full moon of Thadingyut 553 ME Pagan
- Occupation: Buddhist monk

Religious life
- Religion: Buddhism
- School: Theravada
- Lineage: Mahavihara
- Dharma names: Uttarajīva ဥတ္တရဇီဝ

Senior posting
- Teacher: Shin Ariyawuntha
- Based in: Pagan
- Predecessor: Shin Panthagu
- Successor: Shin Siha Maha Upali
- Students: Shin Chapata

The Venerable Shin Uttarajīva (Burmese: ရှင်ဥတ္တရဇီဝ [ʃɪ̀ɰ̃ ʔoʊʔtəɹa̰ zìwa̰]; died c. 5 October 1191) was Primate of Pagan Kingdom during the reigns of three kings Narathu, Naratheinkha and Narapatisithu from 1167 to 1191. The Theravada Buddhist monk presided over the realignment of Burmese Buddhism with the Mahavihara school of Ceylon, away from the Conjeveram-Thaton school of Shin Arahan.

== History ==
The primate, who was of Mon descent, and a group of Burmese monks visited Ceylon on a religious mission in 1180. (Some Sri Lankan sources state the year of the visit was more likely circa 1171-1173.) He also brought a few young monks, including a 19-year-old Shin Chapata. Over the course of visit, Shin Uttarajiva decided to realign Burmese Theravada Buddhism, which probably came from Conjeveram in South India via Thaton, to the Mahavihara school. The returning monks refused to accept the validity of Thaton-Buddhism ordination.

The quarrel became a schism: those who derived their ordination from Shin Arahan were known as the Former Order; those who derived it from Ceylon were known as the Latter Order. The king supported the new movement. More and more monks were sent to Ceylon where they received ordination at the ancient Mahavihara Monastery. Shin Uttarajiva died in October 1191 (right around the end of Buddhist Lent). By then, the Mahavihara school became the predominant school of Burmese Buddhism. Shin Chapata also returned from Ceylon right after his teacher's death, and carried on his teacher's reformation effort. But the old order did not yield easily. The schism lasted two centuries before Conjeveram Buddhism finally died out.

Shin Uttarajiva was succeeded by Shin Siha Maha Upali as primate.

== Bibliography ==
- Hall, D.G.E. (1960). Burma (3 ed.). Hutchinson University Library. ISBN 978-1-4067-3503-1.
- Harvey, G. E. (1925). History of Burma: From the Earliest Times to 10 March 1824. London: Frank Cass & Co. Ltd.
- Royal Historical Commission of Burma (1832). Hmannan Yazawin (in Burmese). Vol. 1–3 (2003 ed.). Yangon: Ministry of Information, Myanmar.
- Sirisena, W.M. (1978). Sri Lanka and South-East Asia: political, religious and cultural relations from A.D. c. 1000 to c. 1500. Brill Archive. ISBN 9789004056602.

Buddhist titles
Preceded by Shin Panthagu	Primate of Pagan Kingdom; 1167–1191	Succeeded by Shin Siha Maha Upali
