= Myauk Pyinthe II (Sithu II) =

Myauk Pyinthe မြောက်ပြင်သည်

Queen of the Northern Palace
- Tenure: c. 1190s – 1211
- Predecessor: Saw Lat
- Successor: Myauk Pyinthe (Htilominlo)
- Spouse: Sithu II
- House: Pagan
- Religion: Theravada Buddhism

Myauk Pyinthe (Burmese: မြောက်ပြင်သည်, pronounced [mjauʔ bjìɴ ðɛ̀]; lit. "Queen of the Northern Palace") was the second Queen of the Northern Palace of King Sithu II of the Pagan Dynasty of Myanmar (Burma).

The name Myauk Pyinthe was the name of the office, meaning "Queen of the Northern Palace". Royal chronicles do not agree on who succeeded the first North Queen Saw Lat. Yazawin Thit (1798) states that the second North Queen was a great-granddaughter of Gen. Nyaung-U Hpi, a friend and comrade of King Kyansittha, who according to Maha Yazawin (1724) and Hmannan Yazawin (1832) was the Queen of the Southern Palace. Instead Maha Yazawin and Hmannan list Pan Yin as the second ranked (North) queen. Yazawin Thit lists Pan Yin as the fourth ranked (West) queen.

All three chronicles agree that the great-granddaughter of Nyaung-U Hpi had three sons, and that Pan Yin had a son.

== Bibliography ==
- Kala, U (1724). Maha Yazawin (in Burmese). Vol. 1–3 (2006, 4th printing ed.). Yangon: Ya-Pyei Publishing.
- Maha Sithu (2012) [1798]. Kyaw Win; Thein Hlaing (eds.). Yazawin Thit (in Burmese). Vol. 1–3 (2nd printing ed.). Yangon: Ya-Pyei Publishing.
- Royal Historical Commission of Burma (1832). Hmannan Yazawin (in Burmese). Vol. 1–3 (2003 ed.). Yangon: Ministry of Information, Myanmar.
- Than Tun (1964). Studies in Burmese History (in Burmese). Vol. 1. Yangon: Maha Dagon.

Myauk Pyinthe II (Sithu II) Pagan Kingdom
Royal titles
| Preceded by Saw Lat | Queen of the Northern Palace c. 1190s – 1211 | Succeeded by Myauk Pyinthe (Htilominlo) |
