= Taung Pyinthe II (Sithu II) =

Taung Pyinthe တောင်ပြင်သည်

Chief Queen Consort of Burma
- Tenure: 1186 – 1211
- Predecessor: Weluwaddy
- Successor: Pwadawgyi
- Spouse: Sithu II
- House: Pagan
- Religion: Theravada Buddhism

Taung Pyinthe (Burmese: တောင်ပြင်သည်, pronounced [tàʊɴ bjìɴ ðɛ̀]) was the second chief queen consort of King Sithu II of the Pagan Dynasty of Myanmar (Burma).

The name Taung Pyinthe was the name of the office, meaning "Queen of the Southern Palace". Royal chronicles do not agree on who succeeded the first chief queen Weluwaddy, who died in 1186. Maha Yazawin (1724) states that the successor was a great granddaughter of Gen. Nyaung-U Hpi, a friend and comrade of King Kyansittha. Yazawin Thit (1798) agrees that Nyaung-U Hpi's great granddaughter was a queen of Sithu II but identifies her as the second Queen of the Northern Palace, not the Southern Palace (Chief Queen). Instead, Yazawin Thit states that Saw Sanay, a great granddaughter of Gen. Htwe Yu, another comrade of Kyansittha, was the next Queen of the Southern Palace with the title of Yadanabon. Maha Yazawin agrees that Saw Sanay was a queen of Sithu II but lists her at a lower rank. Hmannan Yazawin (1832) sides with Maha Yazawin's account.

All three chronicles agree that the great granddaughter of Nyaung-U Hpi had three sons. However, they do not agree on the number of children by Saw Sanay: Maha Yazawin and Hmannan say that Saw Sanay had four children while Yazawin Thit says one.

== Bibliography ==
- Kala, U (1724). Maha Yazawin (in Burmese). Vol. 1–3 (2006, 4th printing ed.). Yangon: Ya-Pyei Publishing.
- Maha Sithu (2012) [1798]. Kyaw Win; Thein Hlaing (eds.). Yazawin Thit (in Burmese). Vol. 1–3 (2nd ed.). Yangon: Ya-Pyei Publishing.
- Royal Historical Commission of Burma (1832). Hmannan Yazawin (in Burmese). Vol. 1–3 (2003 ed.). Yangon: Ministry of Information, Myanmar.
- Than Tun (1964). Studies in Burmese History (in Burmese). Vol. 1. Yangon: Maha Dagon.

Taung Pyinthe II (Sithu II) Pagan Kingdom
Royal titles
Preceded by Weluwaddy	Chief Queen Consort of Burma; 1186 – 1211	Succeeded by Pwadawgyi
