= Manuha Temple =

Buddhist temple in Bagan, Myanmar

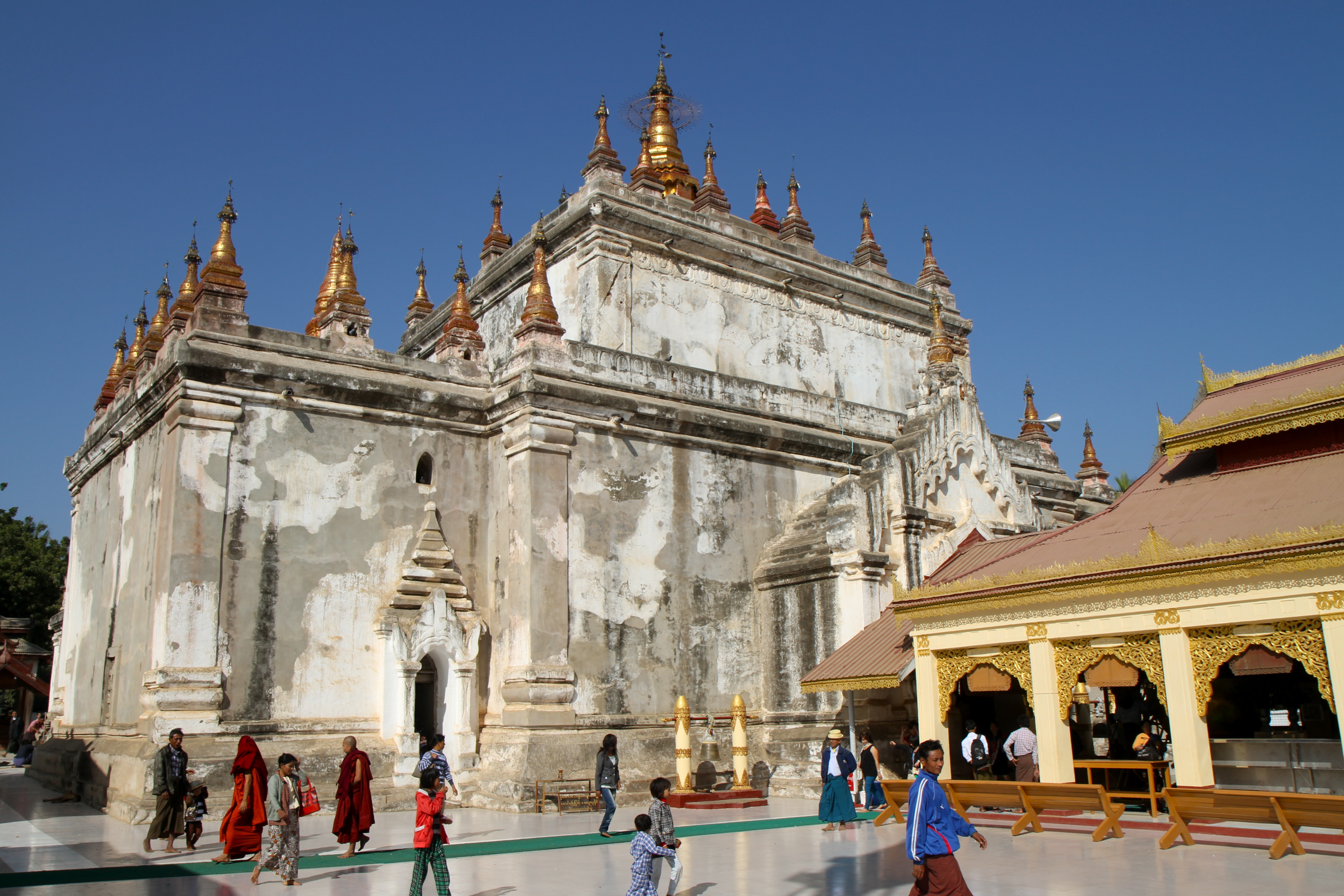

- Location within Myanmar

Religion
- Affiliation: Theravada Buddhism

Location
- Location: Myinkaba, Mandalay Region
- Country: Myanmar
- Interactive map of Manuha Temple
- Coordinates: 21.153408°N 94.859152°E

Architecture
- Founder: King Manuha
- Completed: 1067; 959 years ago

Manuha Temple (Burmese: မနူဟာဘုရား) is a Buddhist temple built in Myinkaba (located near Bagan), by captive Mon King Manuha in 1067, according to King Manuha's inscriptions. It is a rectangular building of two storeys. The building contains three images of seated Buddhas and an image of Buddha entering Final Nibbana. Manuha Temple is one of the oldest temples in Bagan.

About the same time Makuta, captive king of the Thaton Kingdom (his name is now corrupted into 'Manuha'), must have built his colossal images at Myinpagan, where he was living in captivity, a mile S. of Pagan. "Stricken with remorse", says the Glass Palace Chronicle, "he built a colossal Buddha with legs crossed, and a dying Buddha as it were making pariniruâna; and he prayed saying 'Whithersoever I migrate in samsâra, may I never be conquered by another!'" The temple is called Manuha to this day.

== Gallery ==
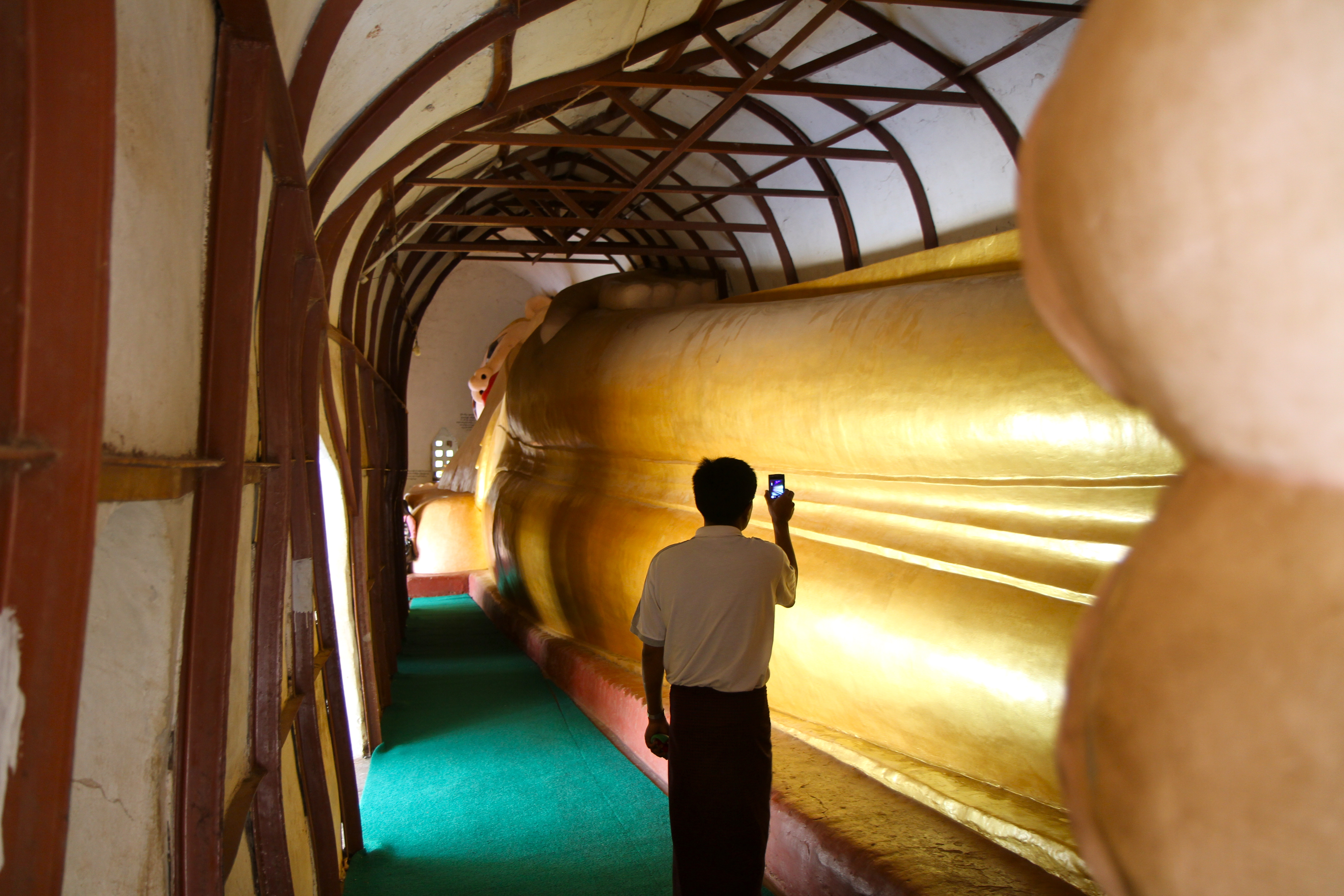
Reclining Buddha at Manuha Temple

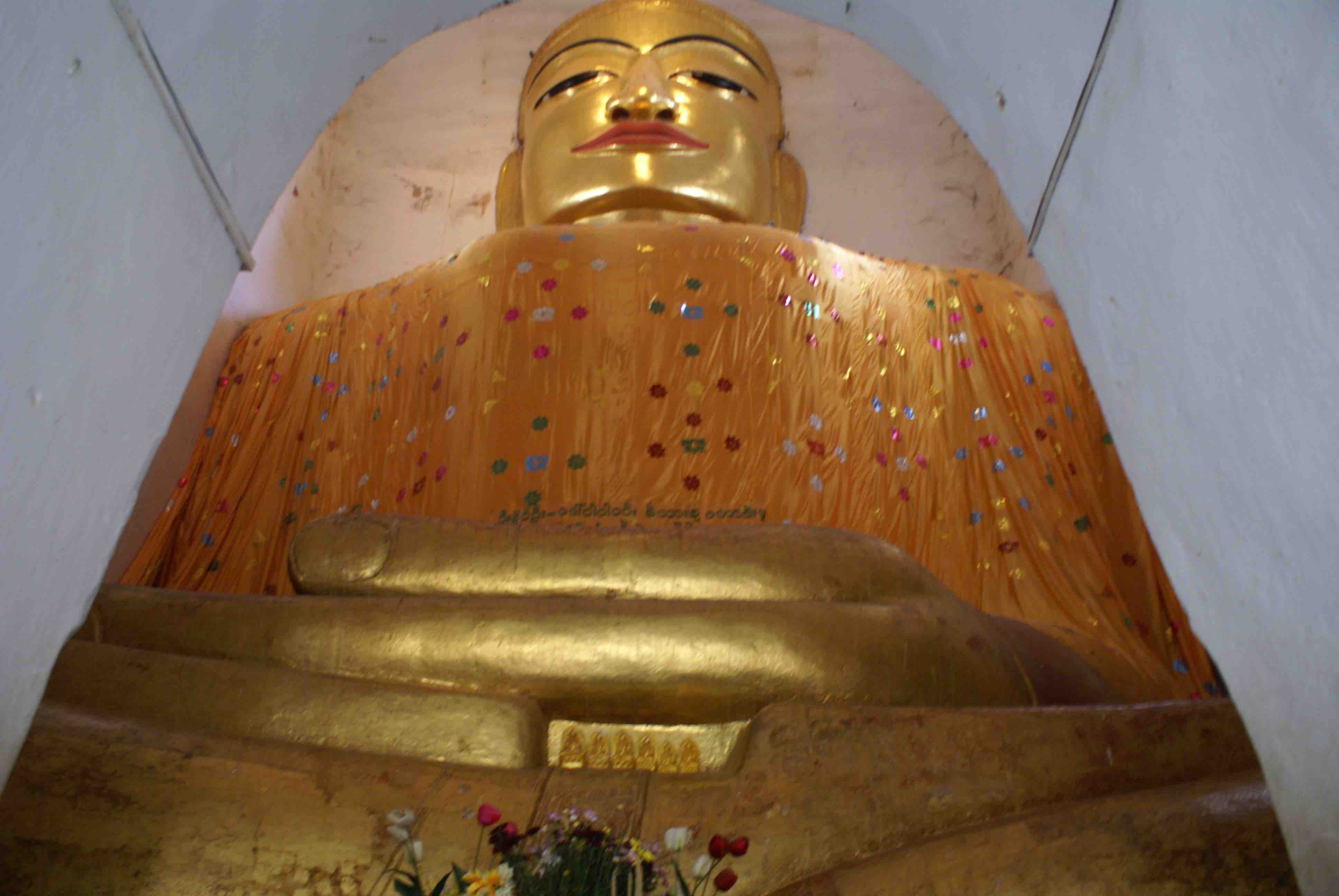
Buddha Image

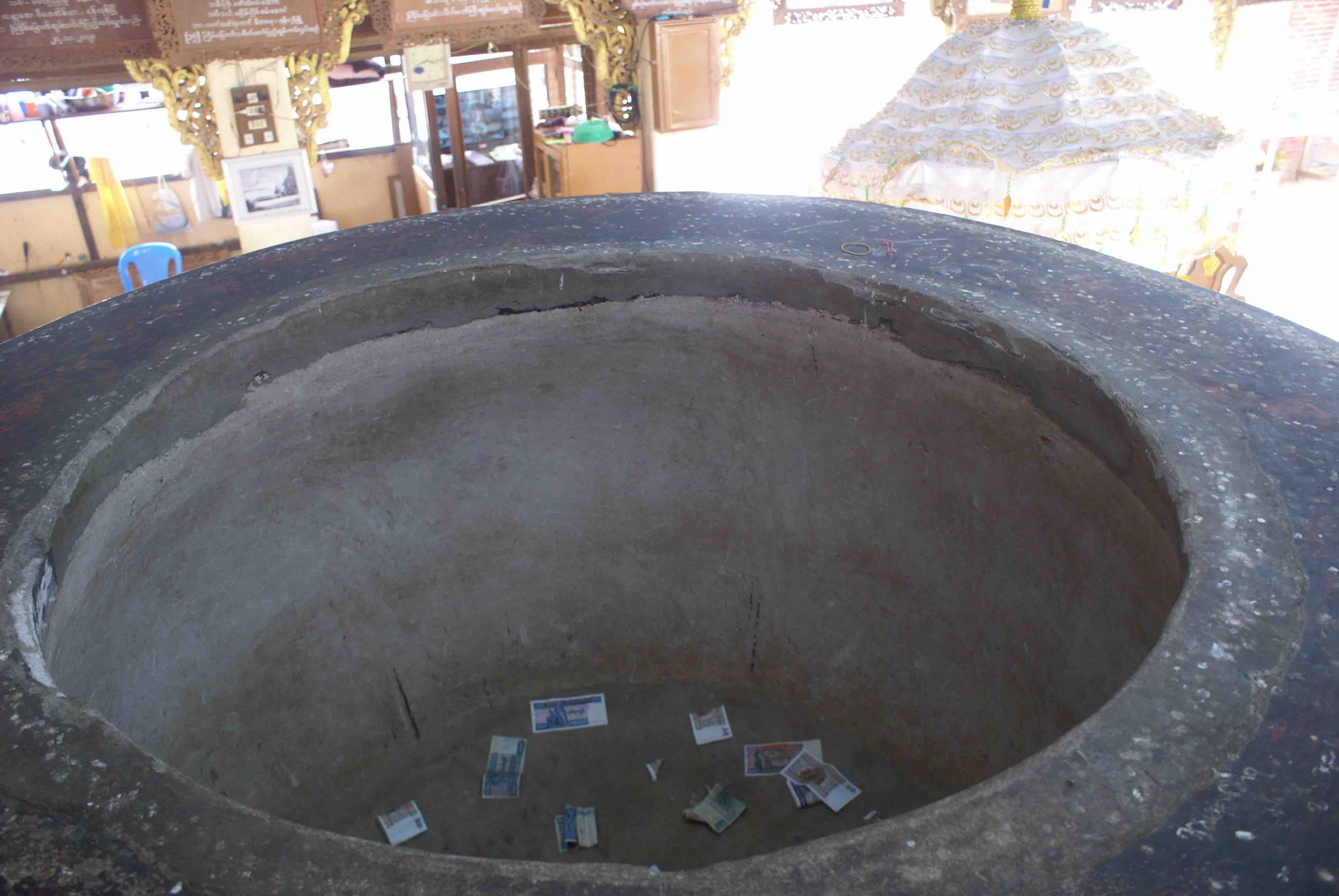
