= Myauk Pyinthe (Htilominlo) =

Myauk Pyinthe မြောက်ပြင်သည်

Queen of the Northern Palace
- Tenure: 1211 – 1231 (or 1235)
- Predecessor: Myauk Pyinthe II (Sithu II)
- Successor: Saw Min Waing
- Spouse: Htilominlo
- Issue: none
- House: Pagan
- Father: Thray Waduna
- Religion: Theravada Buddhism

Myauk Pyinthe (Burmese: မြောက်ပြင်သည်, pronounced [mjauʔ bjìɴ ðɛ̀]; lit. "Queen of the Northern Palace") was a queen consort of King Htilominlo of the Pagan Dynasty of Myanmar (Burma). She had no children.

== Bibliography ==
- Royal Historical Commission of Burma (1832). Hmannan Yazawin (in Burmese). Vol. 1–3 (2003 ed.). Yangon: Ministry of Information, Myanmar.

Myauk Pyinthe (Htilominlo) Pagan Kingdom
Royal titles
| Preceded by Myauk Pyinthe II (Sithu II) | Queen of the Northern Palace; 1211 – 1231 (or 1235) | Succeeded by Saw Min Waing |
