= Gadawpalin Temple =

Buddhist temple in Bagan, Myanmar

- ကန်တော့ပုလင်
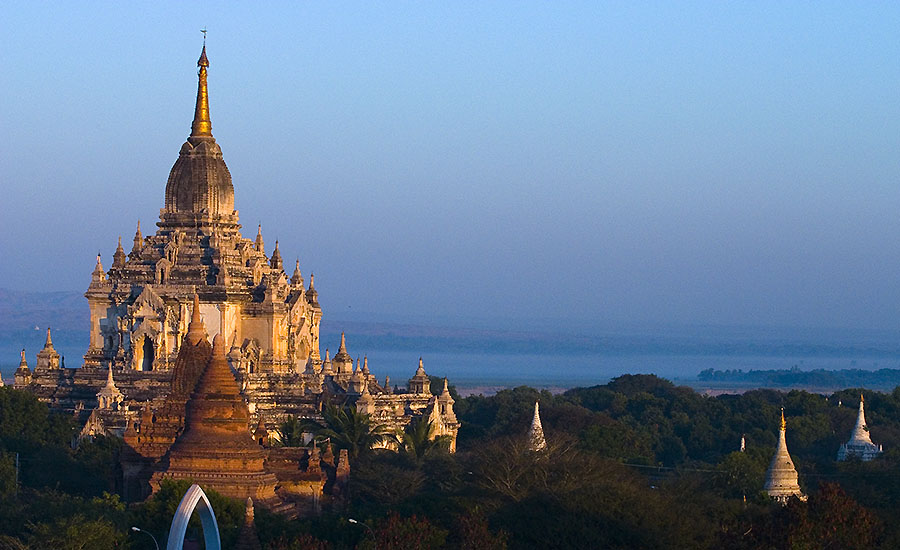
- Gadawpalin Temple

- Location within Myanmar

Religion
- Affiliation: Theravada Buddhism

Location
- Location: Bagan, Mandalay Region
- Country: Myanmar
- Interactive map of Gadawpalin Temple
- Coordinates: 21°10′12″N 94°51′24″E

Architecture
- Founder: Sithu II
- Groundbreaking: 1203
- Completed: 26 March 1227; 799 years ago

Specifications
- Length: 58.3 m (191 ft)
- Width: 43.3 m (142 ft)
- Height (max): 55 m (180 ft)

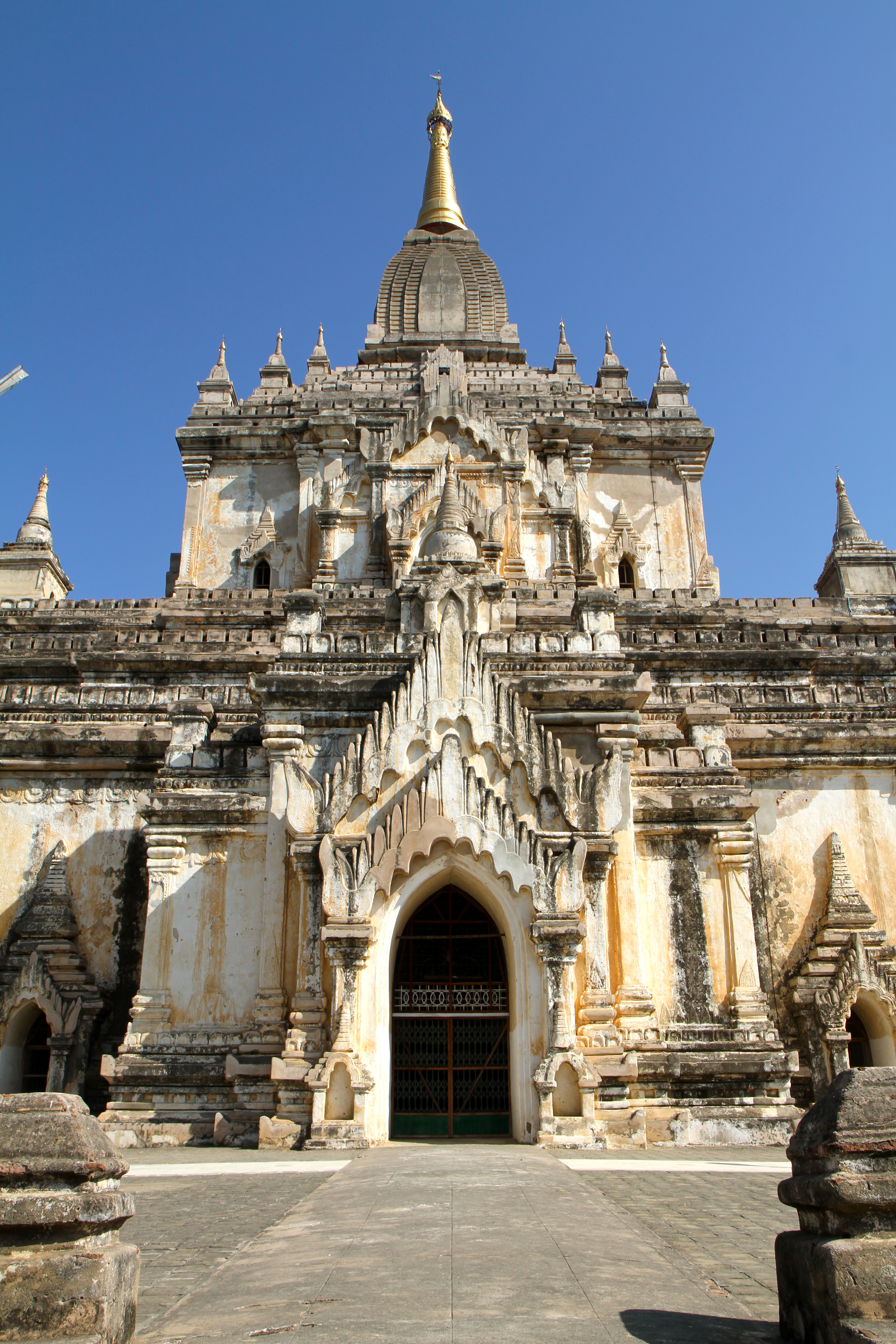
Gadawpalin Pahto

The Gadawpalin Temple (Burmese: ကန်တော့ပလ္လင်ဘုရား, IPA: [ɡɔ́dɔ̰pəlɪ̀ɰ̃ pʰəjá], commonly misspelt Gawdawpalin) is a Buddhist temple located in Bagan, Myanmar. Construction of the pagoda began in 1203 during the reign of Sithu II (1174–1211) and completed on 26 March 1227 during the reign of Htilominlo (1211–1235). At 55 m (180 ft), Gadawpalin Temple is the second tallest temple in Bagan. Similar in layout to the Thatbyinnyu Temple, the temple is two storeys tall, and contains three lower terraces and four upper terraces. The temple was heavily damaged during the 1975 earthquake and was reconstructed in following years.

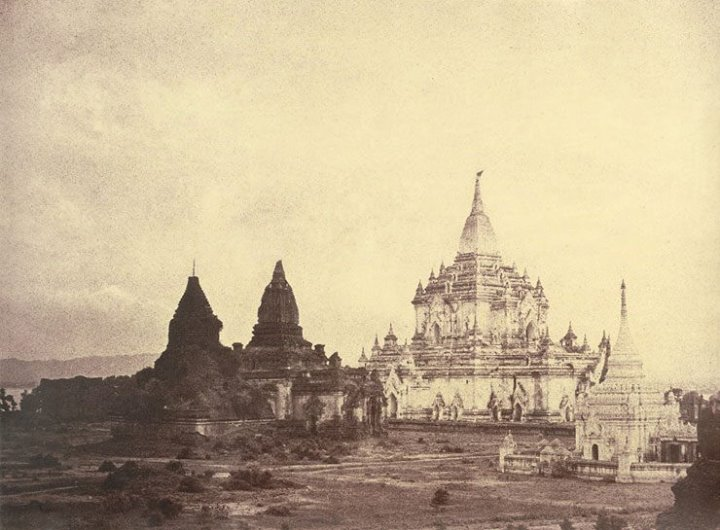
Gadawpalin Temple in 1855

The Gadawpalin Temple belongs to the style of the hollow gu-style temple. In contrast to the stupas, the hollow gu-style temple is a structure used for meditation, devotional worship of The Buddha and conduct other Buddhist rituals. The gu temples come in two basic styles: "one-face" design and "four-face" design—essentially one main entrance and four main entrances. Other styles such as five-face and hybrids also exist. The one-face style grew out of 2nd century Beikthano, and the four-face out of 7th century Sri Ksetra. The temples, whose main features were the pointed arches and the vaulted chamber, became larger and grander in the Bagan period. (Paragraph on "Hollow Temples" copied from Bagan).
