= Shin Arahan =

Thathanabaing of Burma during Pagan Dynasty

- ရှင်အရဟံ Mon: မှာထေရ်အရဟံ
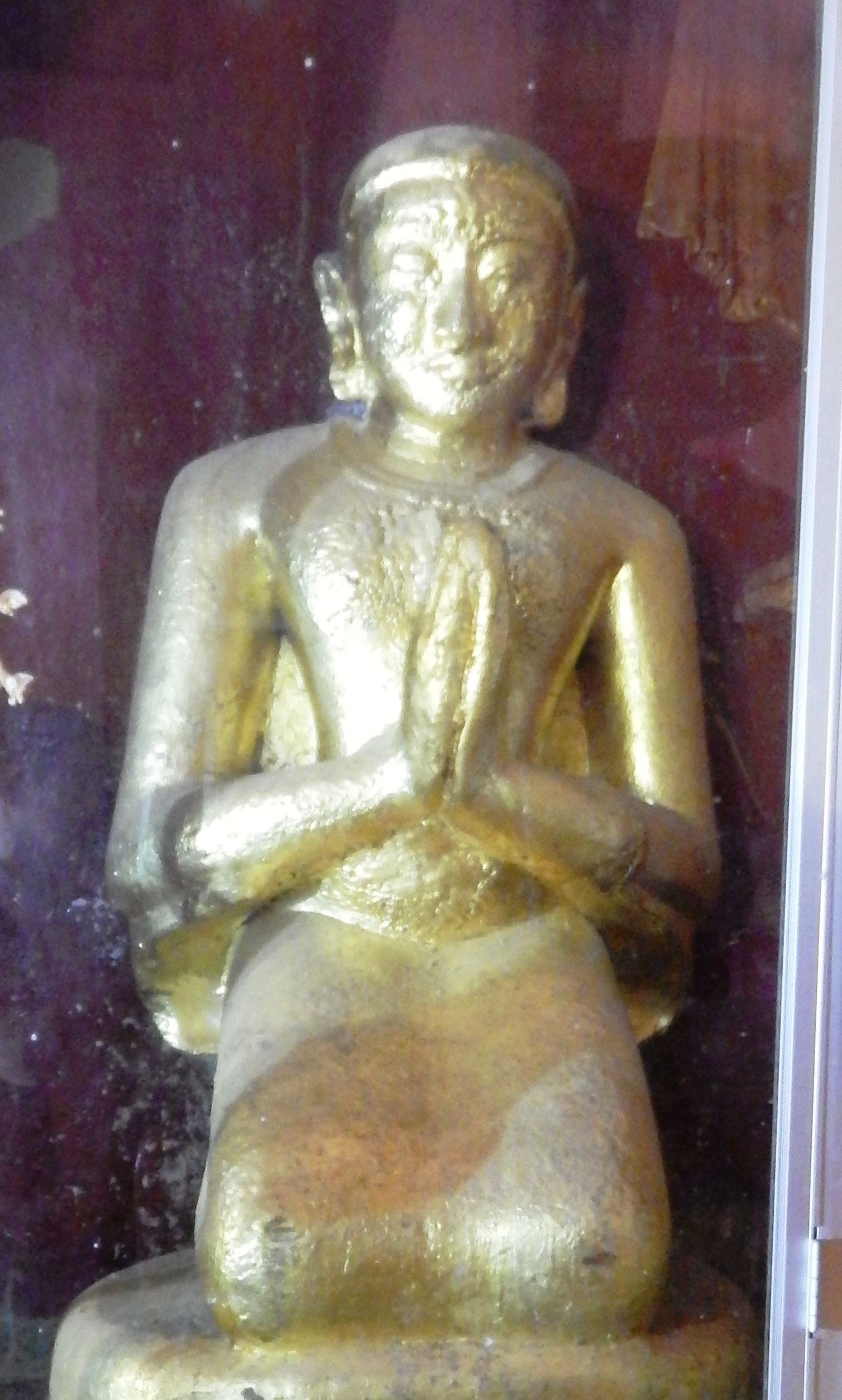
- Statue of Shin Arahan in Ananda Temple
- Title: Sayadaw

Personal life
- Born: c. 1034 Thaton
- Died: 1115 (age 80) Pagan
- Occupation: Buddhist monk

Religious life
- Religion: Buddhism
- School: Theravada
- Lineage: Conjeveram-Thaton
- Dharma names: Dhammadassī ဓမ္မဒဿီ Mon: ဓမ္မဒဿဳ

Senior posting
- Based in: Pagan
- Successor: Shin Panthagu
- Students: Shin Panthagu

The Venerable Shin Arahan (Burmese: ရှင်အရဟံ [ʃɪ̀ɰ̃ ʔəjəhàɰ̃]; formally, Dhammadassī Mahāthera, ဓမ္မဒဿီ မဟာထေရ် [dəma̰dəθì məhàtʰḛi]; c. 1034 – 1115) was Thathanabaing of Burma of the Pagan Kingdom from 1056 to 1115. The monk, a native of Thaton Kingdom, was the religious adviser to four Pagan kings from Anawrahta to Alaungsithu. He is credited with converting Anawrahta to Theravada Buddhism, and overseeing the subsequent reformation of the Buddhist school throughout the kingdom. However, evidence strongly suggests that the Theravada Buddhism of Shin Arahan and early Pagan was one strongly influenced by Hinduism as compared to later more orthodox standards. Within 75 years of Shin Arahan's death, the Buddhism of Pagan would be realigned with the Mahavihara school of Ceylon although his Conjeveram-Thaton school lasted 200 more years before finally dying out.

Nonetheless, his conversion of Anawrahta is viewed as a key turning point in the history of Theravada Buddhism. The powerful king's embrace greatly helped stabilize the Buddhist school, which had hitherto been in retreat elsewhere in South and Southeast Asia. The success of Pagan Empire made the Buddhist school's later spread in mainland Southeast Asia in the 13th and 14th centuries possible.

== Biography ==
The story of Shin Arahan first appeared in the chronicle Maha Yazawin of 1724, and was repeated in the chronicle Hmannan Yazawin of 1832. Although some modern historians have vigorously questioned the accuracy of the story, most historians continue to accept the story as a genuine artifact of Burmese tradition.

=== Visit to Pagan ===
According to the tradition, Shin Arahan was a Theravada Buddhist monk from Thaton Kingdom. (His origins are unclear. The Burmese chronicles report that Shin Arahan was born of a Brahmin’s virgin wife. He is generally believed to be of Mon descent though when asked, he did not say that he was Mon; instead he replied that he was of the race of Buddha and that he followed Buddha’s dhamma.)

At 22, he left for the northern kingdom of Pagan because was dissatisfied with the decaying state of Theravada Buddhism, and an increasing influence of Hinduism at Thaton. The Mon chronicles corroborate the story, hinting that King Manuha of Thaton was reprehensible for making a compromise with Hinduism. At Pagan, the young monk met the king of Pagan, Anawrahta, and converted him to Theravada Buddhism from his native Ari Buddhism. The king had been dissatisfied with the state of Buddhism at Pagan. He considered the Ari monks, who ate evening meals, drank liquor, presided over animal sacrifices, and enjoyed a form of ius primae noctis, depraved.

It turned out to be a perfect partnership. Shin Arahan found in Anawrahta a powerful monarch that could help implement his dream of purifying the religion. Anawrahta found in Theravada Buddhism, a substitute to break the power of the clergy, and in Shin Arahan, a guide who could help him accomplish it.

=== Reforms ===
From 1056 onwards, Anawrahta, under Arahan's guidance, implemented a series of religious reforms throughout his kingdom. The reforms gained steam after Pagan's conquest of Thaton, which brought much needed scriptures and clergy from the vanquished kingdom. Shin Arahan housed the scriptures in the Tripitikataik library, which is still to be seen at Pagan.

Anawrahta broke the power of the Ari monks first by declaring that his court would no longer heed if people ceased to yield their children to the priests. Those who were in bondage of the priests gained freedom. Some of the monks simply disrobed or followed the new way. But the majority of the monks who had wielded power for so long would not go down easily. Anawrahta banished them in numbers; many of them fled to Popa Hill and the Shan Hills. (However, the Aris did not die out. Their descendants, known as forest dwelling monks, remained a powerful force patronized by the royalty down to the Ava period in the 16th century. Likewise, the nat (spirit) worship continued down to the present day.)

Next, Shin Arahan, who deemed the Thaton Buddhism itself was impure, helped revitalize a more orthodox form of Theravada Buddhism by inviting Buddhist scholars from neighboring states to Pagan. Under his guidance, Anawrahta invited scholars from the Mon lands and Ceylon, as well as India where Buddhist monks were fleeing the Muslim conquerors. The scholarship helped revitalize a more orthodox form of Theravada Buddhism.

He also oversaw the training of the sangha and founding of over a thousand monasteries across the kingdom in order to spread the religion. He traveled extensively across the kingdom, as far down as Tenasserim.

When his royal patron Anawrahta died in 1077, the reforms Shin Arahan helped initiate had been in place for some two decades. He stayed on as the religious adviser for the next three kings--Saw Lu, Kyansittha and Alaungsithu, and assisted in their coronation ceremonies.

=== Death ===
Shin Arahan died at age 80 (81st year) in 1115, during the reign Alaungsithu at Pagan. He was succeeded as primate by his student Shin Panthagu. Shin Arahan prophecy will samsara next millennium, as mon ethnographic group within British rule in Burma and Internal conflict in Myanmar period

== Buddhism of Shin Arahan ==
Historians contend that even the reformed religion of Shin Arahan, Anawrahta and other Pagan kings was one still strongly influenced by Hinduism when compared to later more orthodox (18th and 19th century) standards. Tantric, Saivite, and Vaishnava elements enjoyed greater elite influence than they would later do, reflecting both the relative immaturity of early Burmese literacy culture and its indiscriminate receptivity to non-Burman traditions. Indeed, even today's Burmese Buddhism contains many animist, Mahayana Buddhist and Hindu elements. They also question Shin Arahan's contribution to the reformation (purification) of the religion, raising doubt that the Buddhism of Thaton was more rigid than that in Pagan.

Indeed, evidence for the reform attested to him cannot be found at Pagan. The evidence, if anything, points in the opposite direction. The monk advocated for a stronger link between Burmese Buddhism and the Hindu god Vishnu. The frescoes in of Nandaminnya Temple, which Shin Arahan dedicated, in Pagan are "patently Ari". The full range of stories in Burmese cultural memory demonstrates that his reform was not so neat and tidy as the post-medieval narrative suggests. Burmese historian Than Tun writes: “Buddhism during the Buddha’s lifetime was in a sense pure, but as time went by it was modified to suit the time and place. Burma is no exception.”

Within the century of Shin Arahan's death, the Buddhism of Pagan would be realigned with the Mahavihara school of Ceylon, away from his Conjeveram-Thaton school. (The Conjeveram school originated in Kanchipuram, Tamil Nadu in 5th century AD, based on the writings of monk Dhammapala.) By 1192, the Mahavihara school became the predominant school of Burmese Buddhism by the efforts of Shin Uttarajiva. But Shin Arahan's order did not yield easily. The schism lasted two centuries before Shin Arahan's Conjeveram Buddhism finally died out.

== Legacy ==
The Theravada Buddhism of Shin Arahan might not be as pure as the Burmese cultural memory recalls but his legacy looms large in Burmese history nonetheless. His conversion of Anawrahta is seen as a key turning point. The powerful king's embrace of Theravada Buddhism greatly helped stabilize the Buddhist school, which had been retreat elsewhere in South and Southeast Asia until then. In 1071, Ceylon, the birthplace of Theravada Buddhism, had to ask Pagan, which became Theravada only some 15 years earlier, for the religious texts because their war with the Hindu Cholas had wiped out the entire clergy base. In Southeast Asia, only Pagan was Theravadin. The other mainland power, Khmer Empire, was Hindu. The patronage of Pagan Empire provided the Buddhist school with a safe shelter, and made its spread to Siam, Laos and Cambodia in the 13th and 14th centuries possible.

== Ordinations ==
Shin Arahan Thera ordained new monasteries, which were a part of the life of the religion, in Bagan and the kingdom of King Anawrahta, in accordance with the teachings of the scriptures. Among these monasteries (according to the Vinaya Linkara Commentary), the one that should be considered as a model is the one near the Kusinarun Pagoda southeast of Myen Ka Pa village. The number of monasteries ordained by Shin Arahan Thera is (according to records) (27). These monasteries are (6) in the east of Bagan, (4) in the south, and (4) in the north. There are (9) monasteries in Meiktila and (4) in Mandalay.

The Thein in the eastern part of Bagan are -

1. Theingyi in the Shwe Si Khon precinct
2. Theingyi in the village of Tayuzana (6 pillars and 400 ta) between Bagan and Tayuzana
3. Theingyi in the village of Zee Kyin
4. Theingyi in Tayuzana
5. Theingyi between Nwatto Gyi and Kyaukpadaung
6. Taungtha Nel, Kyauksaung

Theingyi in the southern part of Bagan are -

1. Theingyi in the village of Tayuzana
2. Theingyi in the village of Kyaukpadaung
3. Theingyi in the village of Tayuzana
4. Theingyi in the northern part of Bagan are -
5. Theingyi in Nyaungpinhla
6. Theingyi in Ai Ye U Sakan
7. Theingyi in Ye Kyi
8. Theingyi in Ku Ywa.

Theingyi in Meiktila are (4) above the lake, (4) below the lake, (1) in the city center. They are -

1. Pathida Thein
2. Kathukam Thein
3. Wutkyaw Thein
4. Shinpinku Thein
5. Tharphan Thein
6. Kalin Chey Thein
7. Kuphyu Thein
8. Kontaung Thein
9. Thi Tsin Thein.

The four Thein in and near Mandalay are -

1. Thankhaungyan Thein (located in Tagun Tai Yap, Pyaygyi Tagun Township, inside Pyay Monastery)
2. Naywin Thein (located on Nyaung Kwe (11) Street, Aung Myay Thar Zan Township)
3. Nayky Thein (located on Bo Tak Kone, Aung Myay Thar Zan Township)
4. Muntung Thein (located between Street 30, Kankaw Old Quarter, Chan Aye Thar Zan Township, Myo Pak Street and Street 52)

Among the five ordinations for novice monks, the attainment of the Dhamma is an important factor. Therefore, the Venerable Arahant Thera ordained the necessary abbots to promote the development of the Dhamma. The renowned scholar and scholar of Pakokku, the Venerable Nandawansa Thera, also stated in the history of Shwe Si Khon Pagoda that the Venerable Arahant Thera was a true arahant. He said this with complete evidence.

Buddhist titles
Preceded by None	Thathanabaing of Burma of Pagan Kingdom; 1056–1115	Succeeded by Shin Panthagu
