= Weluwaddy =

Chief queen consort of Burma (died 1186)

Weluwaddy ဝေဠုဝတီ

Chief queen consort of Burma
- Tenure: 1174 – 1186
- Predecessor: Min Aung Myat
- Successor: Taung Pyinthe II (Sithu II)

Queen of the Western Palace
- Tenure: c. April – May 1174
- Predecessor: vacant
- Successor: vacant
- Born: c. 1150s Myinsaing, Pagan Empire
- Died: 1186; Pagan (Bagan), Pagan Empire
- Spouse: Naratheinkha (1174); Sithu II (1174–86)
- Issue: Zeya Thura
- House: Pagan
- Religion: Theravada Buddhism

Weluwaddy (Burmese: ဝေဠုဝတီ, pronounced [wèlṵ wədì]; Pali: Veḷuvatī; d. 1186) was a chief queen consort of King Sithu II of the Pagan Dynasty of Myanmar. According to the royal chronicles, Sithu II overthrew his brother King Naratheinkha after his brother seized his wife Weluwaddy in 1174.

== Early life ==
According to the chronicles, the future queen was born inside the stalk of a glowing bamboo plant in the forest of Myinsaing. She was found by a commoner family, and grew up to be a great beauty. When King Naratheinkha came to power in 1171, the chief of Myinsaing sent her as part of his tribute to the new king. At the palace in Pagan (Bagan), the king was not impressed by the country girl before him. He is said to have particularly disliked her ears, deeming them too large. He passed, and gave her to his younger brother Crown Prince Narapati who made her a junior wife.

== At Pagan ==
Chronicles say that the former country girl blossomed into a sophisticated beauty in the next few years. Her transformation was orchestrated by the dowager queen Myauk Pyinthe. The queen mother had the girl's ears surgically reduced, sent her to finishing school, and personally taught her court etiquette. The junior princess is said to have emerged more beautiful and sophisticated than all other princesses at the palace. She was finally noticed by the king himself one day when she accompanied the queen mother to a party at the palace. There, the king was taken by her beauty, and now coveted his brother's wife.

Naratheinkha's attempt to seize her in the next few months would alter the course of history. The king hastily came up with a scheme: He had a minister falsely report a rebellion in the extreme north of the kingdom at Ngasaunggyan (present-day Dehong, Yunnan), and ordered his brother, commander-in-chief of the royal army, to march there. As ordered, Narapati left with the army. When the army reached Thissein (modern Shwebo District), about 210 km north of Pagan, Naratheinkha raised his sister-in-law to queen. Within a few days, a cavalry officer loyal to the crown prince delivered the news to Thissein. Narapati turned around, and sent an elite company of 80 troops led by Commander Aung Zwa with the order to assassinate the king.

== Queen of Pagan ==
In 1174, Narapati became king as Sithu II. All three main chronicles say that she became the chief queen consort with the title of Weluwaddy (Pali: Veluvati). However, a contemporary inscription from Sithu II's reign places her last in a list of six senior queens. The couple had a son, Zeya Thura. Both Weluwaddy and Zeya Thura were given the towns of Talok, Amyint and Aneint (modern Myingyan and Monywa Districts) in fief.

She died in 1186. (Note: Maha Yazawin (Maha Yazawin Vol. 1 2006: 214) says she died in early 538 ME (1176) but Hmannan Yazawin (Hmannan Vol. 1 2003: 321) corrects it, saying she died in early 548 ME (1186).) After her death, the king dedicated the Shwe Thabeik Pagoda in Talok (Myingyan District).

== Veneration ==
Weluwaddy is venerated as a nat (spirit) in Burmese folk religion and is enshrined at the Kuni Shrine in Pakhan.

== Bibliography ==
- Harvey, G. E. (1925). History of Burma: From the Earliest Times to 10 March 1824. London: Frank Cass & Co. Ltd.
- Kala, U (1724). Maha Yazawin (in Burmese). Vol. 1–3 (2006, 4th printing ed.). Yangon: Ya-Pyei Publishing.
- Maha Sithu (2012) [1798]. Kyaw Win; Thein Hlaing (eds.). Yazawin Thit (in Burmese). Vol. 1–3 (2nd ed.). Yangon: Ya-Pyei Publishing.
- Royal Historical Commission of Burma (1832). Hmannan Yazawin (in Burmese). Vol. 1–3 (2003 ed.). Yangon: Ministry of Information, Myanmar.
- Than Tun (1964). Studies in Burmese History (in Burmese). Vol. 1. Yangon: Maha Dagon.

Weluwaddy Pagan Kingdom Born: c. 1150s Died: 1186
Royal titles
Preceded by Min Aung Myat	Chief queen consort of Burma; 1174–1186	Succeeded by Taung Pyinthe II (Sithu II)
Vacant	Queen of the Western Palace; 1174	Vacant
