= Min Aung Myat =

Min Aung Myat မင်းအောင်မြတ်

Queen of the Southern Palace
- Tenure: 1174 – c. 1185
- Predecessor: herself as Chief Queen
- Successor: Weluwaddy

Chief Queen Consort of Burma
- Tenure: 1171 – 1174
- Predecessor: Taung Pyinthe
- Successor: Weluwaddy
- Born: c. 1140s Pagan (Bagan)
- Died: c. 1185; Pagan
- Spouse: Naratheinkha (c. late 1150s–1174); Sithu II (1174–c. 1185)
- Issue: Saw Pyei Chantha
- House: Pagan
- Mother: Kyaungdawthe
- Religion: Theravada Buddhism

Min Aung Myat (Burmese: မင်းအောင်မြတ်, pronounced [mɪ́ɴ ʔàʊɴ mjaʔ]; also Saw Aung Myat) was the chief queen consort of King Naratheinkha, and the Queen of the Southern Palace of King Sithu II of the Pagan Dynasty of Myanmar (Burma). King Sithu I and Queen Khin U were her maternal grandparents. Naratheinkha and Sithu II were her second cousins. She and Naratheinkha were married by their grandfather king. She had a daughter, Saw Pyei Chantha, with Naratheinkha, but their child died in the early 1170s during the reign of Naratheinkha.

She became the queen of her brother-in-law, Sithu II, in 1174 when Sithu II overthrew Naratheinkha. She retained the title Taung Pyinthe ("Queen of the Southern Palace") but was no longer the chief queen. (Weluwaddy was the chief queen who partook in the coronation ceremony.) According to the chronicle Yazawin Thit, no extant records say she had any children with Sithu II, and seemed to have died around the same time or right before Weluwaddy since a new queen was raised to the rank of Taung Pyinthe, right after Weluwaddy's death in 1186.

== Bibliography ==
- Maha Sithu (1798). Myint Swe; Kyaw Win; Thein Hlaing (eds.). Yazawin Thit (in Burmese). Vol. 1–3 (2012, 2nd printing ed.). Yangon: Ya-Pyei Publishing.
- Royal Historical Commission of Burma (1832). Hmannan Yazawin (in Burmese). Vol. 1–3 (2003 ed.). Yangon: Ministry of Information, Myanmar.
- Than Tun (1964). Studies in Burmese History (in Burmese). Vol. 1. Yangon: Maha Dagon.

Min Aung Myat Pagan Kingdom Born: c. 1140s Died: c. 1185
Royal titles
Preceded by herself as Chief Queen	Queen of the Southern Palace; 1174 – c. 1185	Succeeded by Weluwaddy as Chief Queen
Preceded by Taung Pyinthe	Chief Queen Consort of Burma; 1171 – 1174	Succeeded by Weluwaddy
