= Nyaung-U Hpi =

- ညောင်ဦးဖီး
- Born: Nyaung-U, Kingdom of Pagan
- Military career
- Allegiance: Pagan Dynasty
- Branch: Royal Burmese Army
- Service years: 1050s–1060s
- Conflicts: Founding of Pagan Empire

Gen. Nyaung-U Hpi (Burmese: ညောင်ဦးဖီး, pronounced [ɲàʊɰ̃ ʔú pʰí]; also spelt as Nyong Oo Phee or Nyaung U Bhi), also known as Nga Phee, was a leading general in King Anawrahta's Royal Army. He was well known as a great swimmer, and later became famous as one of the Four Paladins of Anawrahta.

His great-granddaughter was one of the three chief queens of King Naratheinkha (r. 1168–1171), with the title of Taung Pyinthi. His great-grandson Nadaungmya was made chief justice by King Narapatisithu (r. 1174–1211). His descendant Yazathingyan was the chief minister of kings Kyaswa, Uzana and Narathihapate.

== Bibliography ==
- Harvey, G. E. (1925). History of Burma: From the Earliest Times to 10 March 1824. London: Frank Cass & Co. Ltd.
- Royal Historical Commission of Burma (1832). Hmannan Yazawin (in Burmese). Vol. 1–3 (2003 ed.). Yangon: Ministry of Information, Myanmar.
