= Aungzwamagyi =

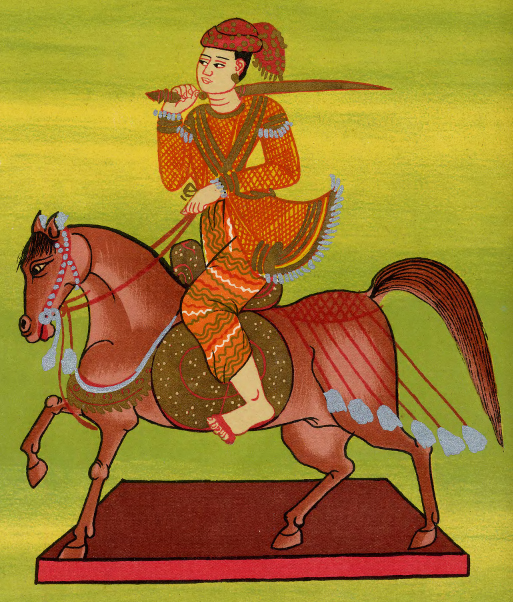
Aungzwamagyi nat

Aungzwamagyi (Burmese: အောင်စွာမကြီး; also called Bo Aung Zwa) is one of the 37 nats in the Burmese pantheon of nats. He is the nat representation of Aung Zwa, a commander in the service of Crown Prince Narapatisithu of Pagan, and the assassin of King Naratheinkha. He is portrayed sitting on a throne, playing a harp and wearing a headdress and a sash.

In 1173, Aung Zwa on Narapatisithu's orders assassinated Naratheinkha who had tried to take one of Narapatisithu's queens as his own. Aung Zwa led a group of 80 soldiers, and infiltrated the palace. He found the king in the privy, and killed him there.

Narapatisithu had promised Aung Zwa the three queens of Naratheinkha for his efforts. But the new king reneged on his promise, after hearing pleas by his three sisters-in-law not to be given to a commoner like Aung Zwa. (The queens were also Narapatisithu's cousins.)

The king told Aung Zwa that:

Nga Aung Zwa Nge, I made thee a promise indeed but if I were to give thee one of my sisters-in-law, it would be held a sin against my grand-sires and great-grand-sires. I will make thee great, and give thee a daughter of a great nobleman.

Aung Zwa, disgusted, said: Pish!

Narapatisithu killed him at once, saying He hath braved me to my face.
