= Myauk Pyinthe (Narathu) =

Myauk Pyinthe မြောက်ပြင်သည်

Queen of the Northern Palace
- Tenure: 1167 – 1171
- Predecessor: Yadanabon I as Chief Queen
- Successor: Saw Lat
- Spouse: Narathu
- Issue: Naratheinkha; Sithu II
- House: Pagan
- Religion: Theravada Buddhism

Myauk Pyinthe (Burmese: မြောက်ပြင်သည်, pronounced [mjauʔ bjìɴ ðɛ̀]; lit. "Queen of the Northern Palace") was a queen consort of King Narathu of the Pagan Dynasty of Myanmar (Burma).

Her existence is inferred. None of the main chronicles has a record of the names of the queens of Narathu. The Yazawin Thit chronicle explicitly says no records of Narathu's queens could be found. Yazawin Thit and Hmannan Yazawin mention only that Naratheinkha and Sithu II had the same mother. Per Than Tun, their mother was the North Queen.

== Bibliography ==
- Royal Historical Commission of Burma (1832). Hmannan Yazawin (in Burmese). Vol. 1–3 (2003 ed.). Yangon: Ministry of Information, Myanmar.

Myauk Pyinthe (Narathu) Pagan Kingdom
Royal titles
Preceded by Yadanabon I as Chief Queen	Queen of the Northern Palace; 1167 – 1171	Succeeded by Saw Lat
