= Narathu =

Narathu နရသူ
- King of Pagan

King of Burma
- Reign: 1167 – c. February 1171
- Predecessor: Sithu I Min Shin Saw (Consecrated)
- Successor: Naratheinkha
- Chief Minister: Ananda Thuriya

Heir-presumptive of Burma
- Reign: 1151–1167
- Predecessor: Min Shin Saw (as heir-apparent)
- Successor: Naratheinkha (as heir-apparent)
- Born: 16 March 1118; Saturday, 9th waning of Late Tagu 479 ME; Pagan (Bagan)
- Died: c. February 1171 (aged 52); Pagan
- Consort: Taung Pyinthe; Myauk Pyinthe
- Issue: Naratheinkha; Narapatisithu
- House: Pagan
- Father: Sithu I
- Mother: Daughter of Dhamakyin
- Religion: Theravada Buddhism

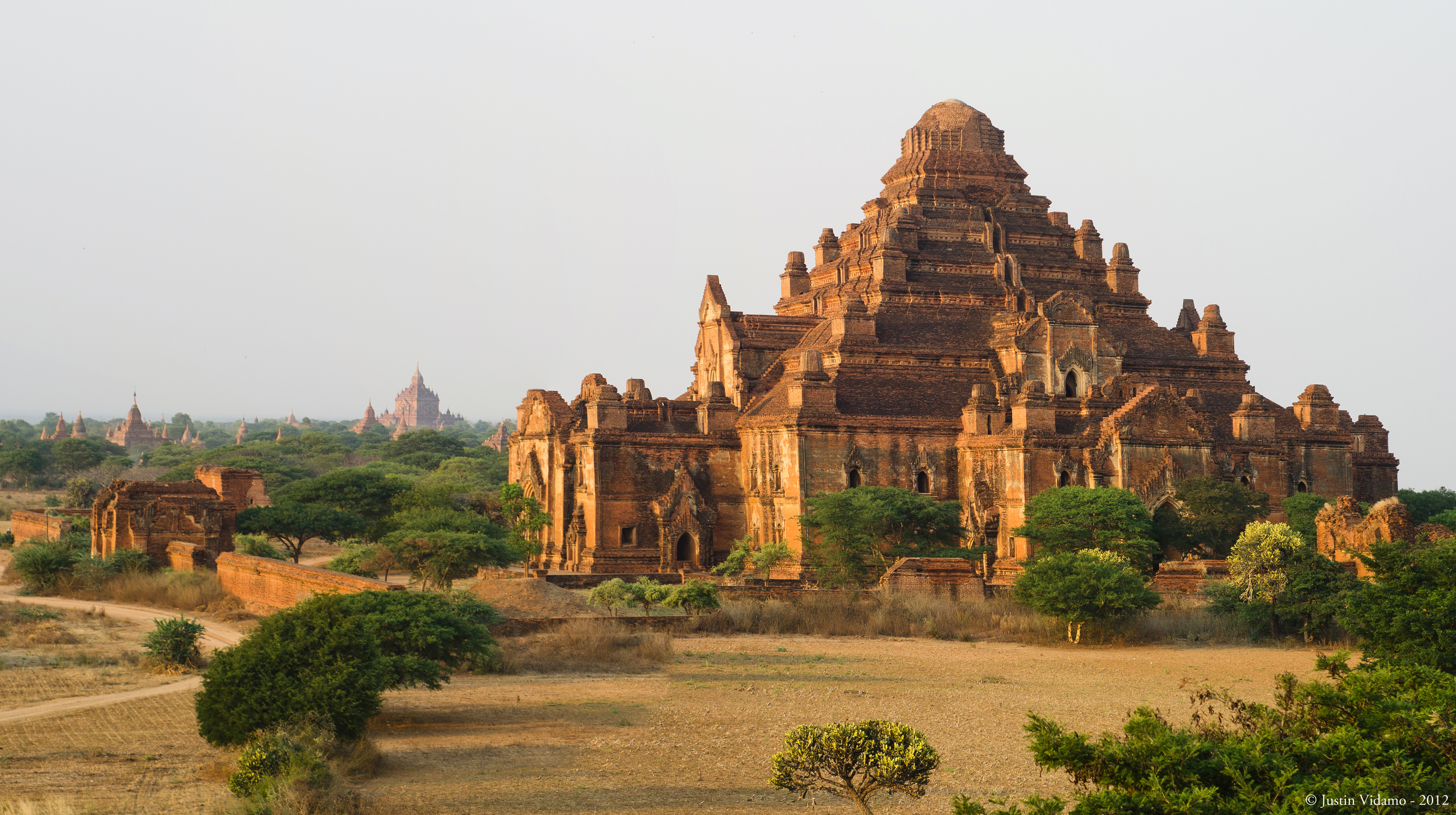
Dhammayangyi Temple at Bagan, Myanmar

Narathu (Burmese: နရသူ, pronounced [nəɹəðù]; 1118–1171) was king of Pagan dynasty of Burma (Myanmar) from 1167 to 1171. Narathu ascended the throne after murdering his father King Alaungsithu and his elder brother Min Shin Saw. Narathu built the largest of all the Buddhist temples, the Dhammayangyi. Nonetheless, his conduct greatly lowered the prestige of the dynasty, and he was deeply disfavored. The king was assassinated by the Indian mercenaries sent by the king of Paṭikkarā (ပဋိက္ကရား) in 1171. He is thus remembered as "Kalaja Min" (ကုလားကျမင်း) ("The king fallen by the kalars).

== Early life ==
Narathu was a middle son of King Sithu I and Queen Yadanabon. His mother was a daughter of Dhamma Kyin, a minister at King Kyansittha's court. The chronicles do not agree on the dates regarding his life and reign. The table below lists the dates given by the four main chronicles.

Chronicles	Birth–Death	Age	Reign	Length of reign
Zatadawbon Yazawin	1118–1170	52	1167–1170	3
Maha Yazawin	1114–1161	47	1158–1161	3
Yazawin Thit	1117–1171	54	1168–1171	3
Hmannan Yazawin	1123–1171	48	1167–1171	4

Narathu was a senior prince for much of his father's reign, whereas the king's eldest son Min Shin Saw was the heir apparent. However, Min Shin Saw had a major falling out with his father, and was sent to exile at Aung Pinle Lake (near present-day Mandalay). With Min Shin Saw in exile, Narathu now positioned himself to take over the throne. He impressed his father with his management of day-to-day affairs of the kingdom. He soon became the de facto heir apparent at the court.

== Accession ==
In 1167, Alaungsithu fell violently ill, and Narathu ordered the king moved to the Shwegugyi Temple, which Sithu had built in 1131. According to the chronicles, when the king woke up and realized that he had been moved out of the palace, he was furious. Narathu came into the room, and put a blanket over his bedridden father's head.

He still needed to deal with Min Shin Saw, who had come down with an army to claim the throne. Narathu readily submitted, personally leading Min Shin Saw's coronation ceremony. After the ceremony, Min Shin Saw was poisoned while eating his first meal as king.

== Reign ==
Narathu's conduct lowered the prestige of the empire, and he was deeply unpopular. Burdened by his guilt, he shut himself in his palace. To atone for the sins, he built the largest of all the Pagan temples, the Dhammayangyi.

It is said that Narathu did not use water after using the toilet, and that the Pateikkaya queen did not let him come near her as a result. Narathu became angry, and killed a queen of his with his bare hands in a fit of rage. The queen was a daughter of the chief of Pateikkaya, a tributary kingdom in the west in Bengal (near present-day Chin State).

== Death ==
=== Assassination by Pateikkaya ===
The chief of Pateikkaya, angered by Narathu's action, sent a group of eight assassins, disguised as Brahmin astrologers in 1171. The eight managed to gain an audience with the king while hiding their swords underneath their robes. They quickly slew the king. When the palace guards rushed in, they all committed suicide.

=== Assassination by Polonnaruwa ===
According to a theory proposed by Gordon Luce, Narathu may have been killed by the assassins from the Kingdom of Polonnaruwa in 1165. His theory has been strongly refuted by Htin Aung as pure conjecture. Wilhelm Geiger also refuted this in his Trustworthiness of Mahavamsa saying "It is hardly doubtful that the report in the Culavamsa of the Ramanna campaign is much exaggerated, as the Burmese chronicles have nothing to say about such a catastrophe having overtaken their country".

== Bibliography ==
- Coedès, George (1968). Walter F. Vella (ed.). The Indianized States of Southeast Asia. trans.Susan Brown Cowing. University of Hawaii Press. ISBN 978-0-8248-0368-1.
- Hall, D.G.E. (1960). Burma (3rd ed.). Hutchinson University Library. ISBN 978-1-4067-3503-1.
- Htin Aung, Maung (1967). A History of Burma. New York and London: Cambridge University Press.
- Htin Aung, Maung (1970). Burmese History before 1287: A Defence of the Chronicles. Oxford: The Asoka Society.
- Kala, U (1724). Maha Yazawin (in Burmese). Vol. 1–3 (2006, 4th printing ed.). Yangon: Ya-Pyei Publishing.
- Royal Historians of Burma (c. 1680). U Hla Tin (Hla Thamein) (ed.). Zatadawbon Yazawin (1960 ed.). Historical Research Directorate of the Union of Burma.
- Royal Historical Commission of Burma (1832). Hmannan Yazawin (in Burmese). Vol. 1–3 (2003 ed.). Yangon: Ministry of Information, Myanmar.

Narathu Pagan Dynasty Born: 16 March 1118 Died: c. February 1171
Regnal titles
Preceded by Sithu I Min Shin Saw (Consecrated)	King of Burma; 1167–1171	Succeeded by Naratheinkha
Royal titles
Preceded by Min Shin Saw	Heir to the Burmese Throne; 1151–1167	Succeeded by Naratheinkha
