= Narapatisithu =

King of Pagan Dynasty, Myanmar

Narapatisithu နရပတိ စည်သူ
- King Sithu II of Pagan
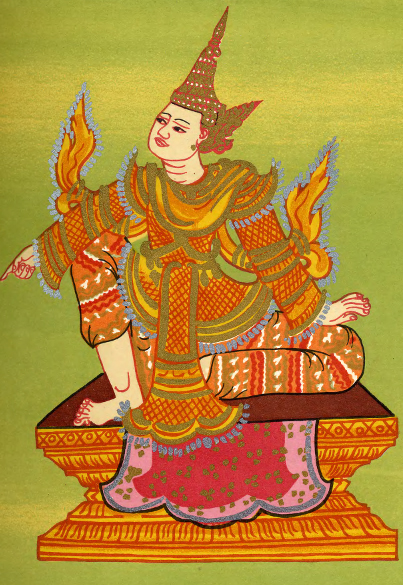
- Depiction as the nat, Min Sithu

King of Burma
- Reign: c. May 1174 – 18 August 1211
- Predecessor: Naratheinkha
- Successor: Htilominlo
- Born: 1138; Pagan
- Died: 18 August 1211 (aged 73); Thursday, 10th waxing of Tawthalin 573 ME; Pagan
- Consort: Weluwaddy; Min Aung Myat; Saw Lat; Saw Ahlwan; Taung Pyinthe; Myauk Pyinthe; Wadanthika; Saw Mya Kan
- Issue: Zeya Thura; Yaza Thura; Ginga Thura; Pyanchi; Zeya Theinkha
Regnal name
- Śrī Tribhuvanāditya Pavaradhammarāja
- House: Pagan
- Father: Narathu
- Mother: Myauk Pyinthe
- Religion: Theravada Buddhism

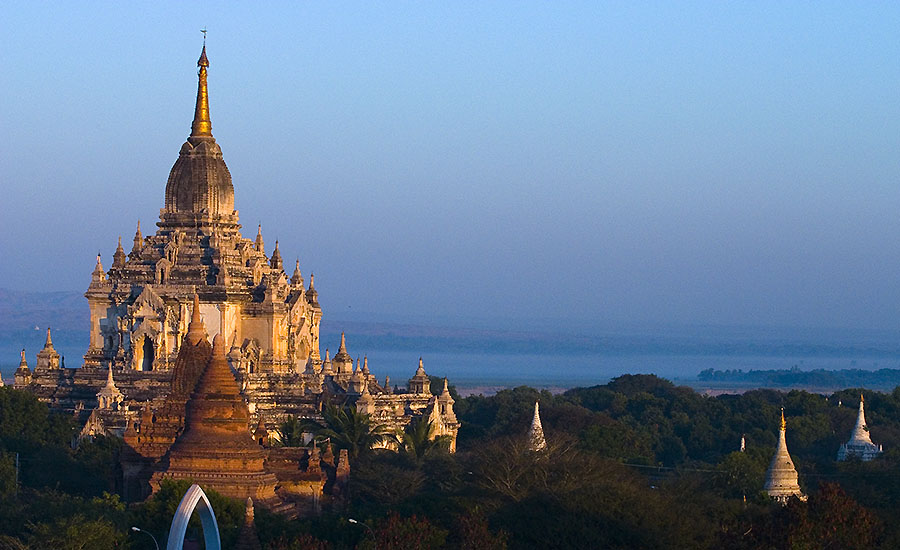
Gawdawpalin Temple, built by Narapati Sithu.

Narapati Sithu (Burmese: နရပတိ စည်သူ, pronounced [nəɹa̰pətḭ sìðù]; also Narapatisithu, Sithu II or Cansu II; 1138–1211) was king of Pagan dynasty of Burma (Myanmar) from 1174 to 1211. He is considered the last important king of the Pagans. His peaceful and prosperous reign gave rise to Burmese culture which finally emerged from the shadow of Mon and Pyu cultures. The Burman leadership of the kingdom was now unquestioned. The Pagan Empire reached its peak during his reign, and would decline gradually after his death.

The reign saw many firsts in Burmese history. For the first time, the term Mranma (the Burmans) was openly used in Burmese language inscriptions. Burmese became the primary written language of the kingdom, replacing Mon and Pyu. The first Burmese customary law based on his grandfather Alaungsithu's judgments was compiled, and used as the common system of law for the entire kingdom. He founded the Royal Palace Guards, which later evolved to become the nucleus of the Burmese army in war time.

He encouraged further reforms of the Burmese Buddhism. By the efforts of his primate Shin Uttarajiva, the majority of the Burmese Buddhist monks realigned themselves with the Mahavihara school of Sri Lanka.

== Early life ==
The future king was born to Prince Narathu and his wife (later known as Myauk Pyinthe, "Queen of the Northern Palace") in Pagan (Bagan) on 8 October 1150. The chronicles do not agree on his birth and reign dates. The table below lists the dates given by the four main chronicles.

Chronicles	Birth–Death	Age	Reign	Length of reign
Zatadawbon Yazawin (List of Monarchs section)	1148–1210	62	1173–1210	37
Zatadawbon Yazawin (Royal Horoscopes section)	1146–1212	66	1175–1212	37
Maha Yazawin	1132–1197	65	1164–1197	33
Yazawin Thit and Hmannan Yazawin	1138–1211	73	1174–1211	37
Scholarship	8 October 1150 – 18 August 1211	60	c. May 1174 – 18 August 1211	37

Note that all the chronicles say he was born on a Tuesday but the king's date of birth by scholarship fell on Sunday.

== Heir apparent ==
In 1171, his elder brother Naratheinkha succeeded the throne, the new king was greeted with multiple rebellions by the Kudus in the Tagaung region in the north and the Mons of Tenasserim coast in the south. Naratheinkha appointed his younger brother Narapatisithu as the heir apparent and commander-in-chief to deal with the rebellions. In 1174, Naratheinkha seized Narapati's wife Weluwaddy (Veluvati) after he sent Narapati on a mission. Narapati retaliated by sending a group of 80 led by Aungzwa to assassinate his brother. After the assassination, he ascended the throne as Sithu II in honor of his grandfather Alaungsithu. (Note: Per (Than Tun 1964: 128) and (Coedès 1968: 167): G.H. Luce does not recognize Naratheinkha, and proposes an interregnum of nine years between 1165 and 1174. But Luce's conjecture is vigorously disputed. See (Htin Aung 1970: 40–44) for Htin Aung's response. (Aung-Thwin 1985) does not recognize Luce's theory at all.)

He came to power some time between 27 March 1174 and 10 August 1174, most probably between April or May 1174. (Note: Per (Hmannan Vol. 1 2003: 330), he died on or before (Thursday, 11th waxing of 573 ME / 18 August 1211), having reigned for 37 years. Because he came to power in 536 ME (1174 CE) per (Hmannan Vol. 1 2003: 315), it means he ascended the throne between the New Year's day of 536 ME (27 March 1174) and (11th waxing of 536 ME / 10 August 1174). Moreover, the accession date was most likely between April and May of that year. Per (Hmannan Vol. 1 2003: 314–315), he had just returned from the front. Since almost all the army campaigns were conducted during the dry season which ends in late May before the rainy season, he likely came to power some time between April and May.) He assumed the regnal name "Śrī Tribhuvanāditya Pavaradhammarāja."

== Reign ==
One of the first acts of Sithu II was to found the Royal Palace Guards, whose sole duty was to guard the palace and the king. (The Palace Guards later evolved to become the nucleus round which the Burmese army assembled in war time.) He then had to pacify the kingdom, which had seen much instability since the death of Alaungsithu in 1167, and had grown increasingly restless. He successfully persuaded the great-grandson of the Mon king Manuha not to start a rebellion. The rest of the reign was free of rebellions.

Narapatisithu appointed Nadaungmya, great-grandson of Nyaung-U Hpi (one of the great Paladins during Anawrahta's reign), chief justice. His chief minister was Ananda Thuriya, reportedly a man of valor who continually hunted down robbers and presented them alive to the king. He had the first Burmese customary law based on his grandfather Alaungsithu's judgments compiled, and used as the common system of law for the entire kingdom.

=== Economy ===
By all accounts, his reign was peaceful and prosperous. Following Anawratha's footsteps, Narapatisithu worked on increasing Upper Burma's economic and manpower advantages over the Irrawaddy valley. He continued to develop the Kyaukse region by building the Kyaukse weir, and expanded the irrigable areas by starting the Mu canals in the present-day Shwebo District. His attempts to expand irrigation southwards into Minbu District by building a canal system repeatedly failed, and had to be abandoned. Through his efforts, the kingdom grew even more prosperous.

The prosperity of the kingdom is reflected in the superb the Gawdawpalin and Sulamani temples in Pagan he built. The king also built the Minmalaung, Dhammayazika and Chaukpala nearby. His lesser pagodas, such as the Zetawun in Myeik District, the Shwe Indein Pagoda in Nyaungshwe (Shan State) shows the reach of his kingdom.

=== Society ===
His reign also saw the rise of Burmese culture which finally emerged from the shadows of Mon and Pyu cultures. The Burmans, who had entered the Irrawaddy valley en masse only in the 9th and 10th centuries, had led the Pagan Kingdom under the name of the Pyu. But now, the Burman leadership of the kingdom was now unquestioned. For the first time, the term Mranma (the Burman people) was openly used in Burmese language inscriptions. (The earliest use of Mranma was found in a Mon inscription dedicated to Kyansittha dated 1102.) The Burmese language became the primary written language of the kingdom, replacing Mon and Pyu.

He encouraged further reforms of the Burmese Buddhism. By the efforts of his primate Shin Uttarajiva, the majority of the Burmese Buddhist monks realigned themselves with the Mahavihara school of Sri Lanka away from the less orthodox Conjeveram-Thaton school.

=== Sinhalese raids ===
According to the Pali Culawamsa Chronicles, the King of Polonnaruwa (Sri Lanka), Parakramabahu I, dispatched an expedition in 1180 to settle a trade dispute. It suffered from storms and several ships were wrecked. But one ship reached the Crow Island near Mawlamyaing and five reached Pathein, killing a governor, burning villages, massacring the inhabitants, and carrying off a number into slavery. As the Burmese chronicles do not mention these events, there is no check on the Sinhalese version. This event has been strongly refuted by historians as pure conjecture.

The Devanagala Rock Inscription of Parakramabahu I in Sri Lanka confirms the raid as it records donation of lands to a returning General from the victories in Ramanna (Burma).

Mahavamsa does not explain how a few little medieval ships could transport enough men to ravage half Burma and fight many fierce battles. The invasion of course was a raid, and probably over before news of it reached Pagan. Harvey (1925)

This Sinhalese raid has been strongly refuted by Htin Aung as pure conjecture. Wilhelm Geiger also refuted this in his trustworthiness of Mahavamsa saying "It is hardly doubtful that the report in the Culavamsa of the Ramanna campaign is much exaggerated, as the Burmese chronicles have nothing to say about such a catastrophe having overtaken their country". Nevertheless, friendly relations were soon resumed and historical cultural exchanges between the countries continued. The reformation of Burmese Buddhism through the Sinhalese Mahavihara school also continued.

== Death ==
Sithu II died at age 73 (in his 74th year) on 18 August 1211 (11th waxing of Tawthalin 573 ME). On his deathbed, he placed the hands of his five sons on his chest and enjoined them to rule with mercy and justice, and to live together in brotherly love.

== Veneration ==
Narapatisithu is venerated as the Min Sithu nat (spirit) in Burmese folk religion and is enshrined at the Kuni Shrine in Pekhan, Yesagyo Township. The story of Min Sithu, the deity, is directly linked to working with the Aungzwamagyi nat to murder his brother.

== Bibliography ==
- Aung-Thwin, Michael (1985). Pagan: The Origins of Modern Burma. Honolulu: University of Hawai'i Press. ISBN 0-8248-0960-2.
- Coedès, George (1968). Walter F. Vella (ed.). The Indianized States of Southeast Asia. trans.Susan Brown Cowing. University of Hawaii Press. ISBN 978-0-8248-0368-1.
- Harvey, G. E. (1925). History of Burma: From the Earliest Times to 10 March 1824. London: Frank Cass & Co. Ltd.
- Htin Aung, Maung (1967). A History of Burma. New York and London: Cambridge University Press.
- Kala, U (1724). Maha Yazawin (in Burmese). Vol. 1–3 (2006, 4th printing ed.). Yangon: Ya-Pyei Publishing.
- Lieberman, Victor B. (2003). Strange Parallels: Southeast Asia in Global Context, c. 800–1830, volume 1, Integration on the Mainland. Cambridge University Press. ISBN 978-0-521-80496-7.
- Luce, G.H. (1970). Old Burma: Early Pagan. Vol. 2. Locust Valley, NY: Artibus Asiae and New York University.
- Maha Sithu (2012) [1798]. Kyaw Win; Thein Hlaing (eds.). Yazawin Thit (in Burmese). Vol. 1–3 (2nd ed.). Yangon: Ya-Pyei Publishing.
- Royal Historians of Burma (c. 1680). U Hla Tin (Hla Thamein) (ed.). Zatadawbon Yazawin (1960 ed.). Historical Research Directorate of the Union of Burma.
- Royal Historical Commission of Burma (1832). Hmannan Yazawin (in Burmese). Vol. 1–3 (2003 ed.). Yangon: Ministry of Information, Myanmar.
- Tarling, Nicholas (1992). The Cambridge History of Southeast Asia (1993 ed.). Cambridge University Press. ISBN 9780521355056.
- Than Tun (1964). Studies in Burmese History (in Burmese). Vol. 1. Yangon: Maha Dagon.

Narapatisithu Pagan Dynasty Born: 8 October 1150 Died: 18 August 1211
Regnal titles
Preceded by Naratheinkha	King of Burma; 1174–1211	Succeeded by Htilominlo
Royal titles
Preceded by Naratheinkha	Heir to the Burmese Throne; 1171–1174	Succeeded by Htilominlo
