= Manuha =

Manuha မကုတရာဇာ မနူဟာ
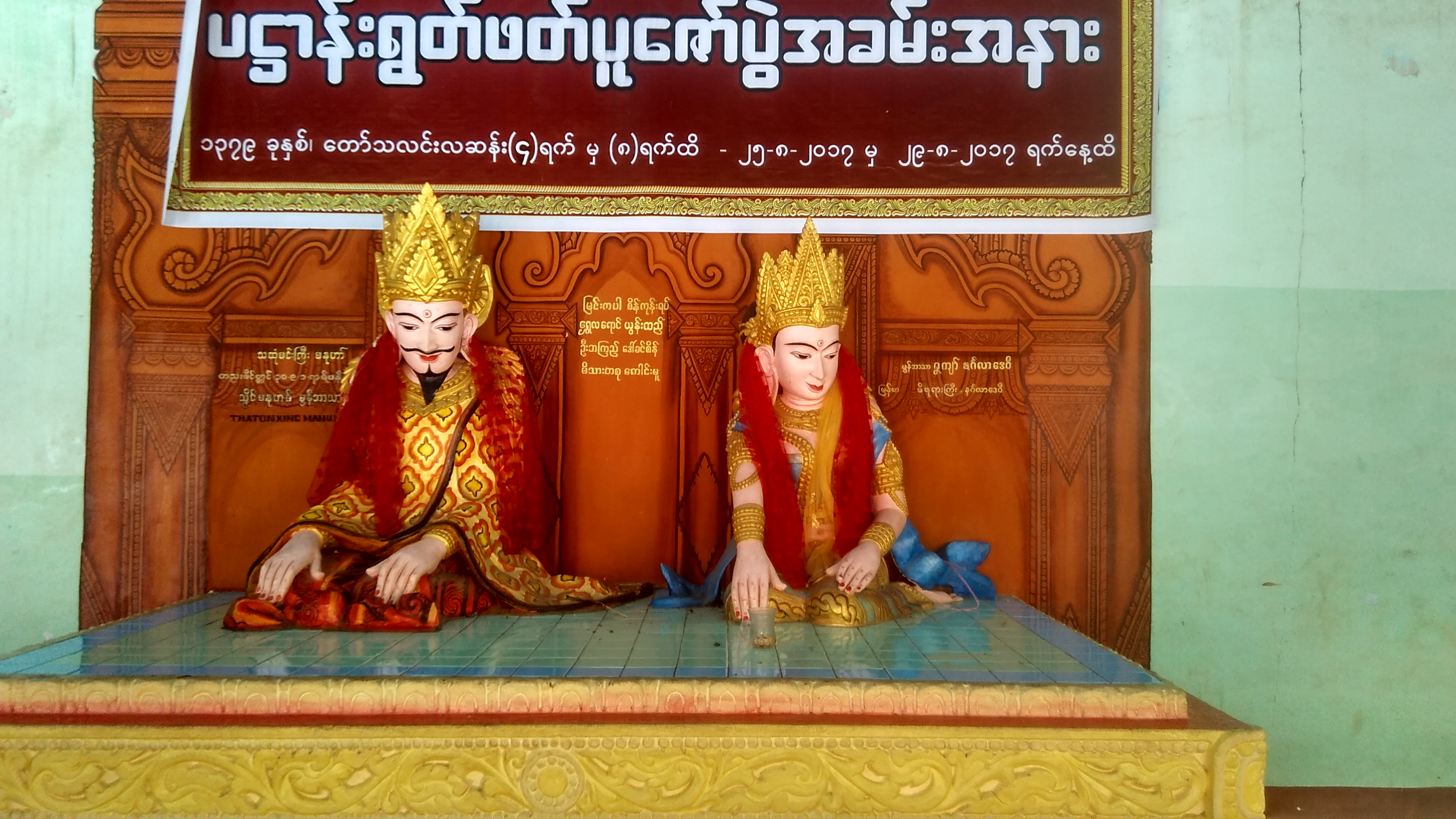
- Manuha and Chief queen statue

King of Thaton
- Reign: 1030s–1057
- Predecessor: Udinna
- Born: Thaton
- Died: Pagan
Names
- House: Thaton dynasty
- Father: Udinna
- Religion: Theravada Buddhism

Manuha (Burmese: မနူဟာ; Mon: မကုတရာဇာ; Old Mon [mɛ̌̀tǔtɑ̌ɾɛ̀ɑʝɛ̀ɑnɛ̀ɑmɛ̌̀]), or Makuta, was the last king of Thaton Kingdom. Manuha ruled Thaton from 1030s until 1057 when he was defeated by King Anawrahta of Pagan Kingdom. According to the Mon tradition, Manuha was the 59th in the line of kings who supposedly founded Thaton during the time of the Buddha in the 6th century BCE.

Traditional Burmese and Mon reconstructions also hold that Anawrahta, a recent convert to Theravada Buddhism, asked for the Theravada Buddhist canon from Manuha. The Mon king reputedly rejected Anawrahta's request, saying that the uncultured Burmans of the north were not worthy of the religion. This refusal was used by Anawrahta as pretense to invade and conquer the Mon kingdom. Despite this account, it is more likely Anawrahta conquered Thaton in order to check the westward advance of Khmer Empire in the Tenasserim coast. Still according to traditional belief, Manuha and his family along with some 30,000 monks and artisans, were brought back to Pagan (Bagan). Between 1050 and about 1085, Mon craftsmen and artisans helped to build some two thousand monuments at Pagan, the remains of which today rival the splendors of Angkor Wat.

However, recent research—still a minority view—argues that Mon influence on the interior after Anawrahta's conquest is a greatly exaggerated post-Pagan legend, and that Lower Burma in fact lacked a substantial independent polity prior to Pagan's expansion. Historian Michael Aung-Thwin (Aung-Thwin 2005) argues that the existence of Thaton is not supported by contemporary evidence.

Manuha asked and was allowed to build the Manuha Temple in Pagan in 1059. Inside the temple three giant Buddha statues—two sitting, and one reclining—seem too large for their enclosures, and their cramped, uncomfortable positions are said to represent the stress and lack of comfort the 'captive king' had to endure.

== Bibliography ==
- Aung-Thwin, Michael (2005). The Mists of Rāmañña: the Legend that was Lower Burma. University of Hawaii Press. ISBN 978-0-8248-2886-8.
- Htin Aung, Maung (1967). A History of Burma. New York and London: Cambridge University Press.
- Lieberman, Victor B. (2003). Strange Parallels: Southeast Asia in Global Context, c. 800–1830, volume 1, Integration on the Mainland. Cambridge University Press. ISBN 978-0-521-80496-7.
- South, Ashley (2003). Mon nationalism and civil war in Burma: the golden sheldrake. Routledge. ISBN 9780700716098.
- Spiro, Melford (1996). Burmese supernaturalism. Transaction Publishers. p. 113. ISBN 9781560008828.

Manuha Thaton Dynasty
Regnal titles
Preceded by Udinna	King of Thaton c. 1030s–1057	Succeeded by Thaton dynasty abolished
