= Thaton kingdom =

4th-century Mon kingdom in Lower Burma

Coordinates: 16°55′44″N 97°22′04″E

Kingdom of Thaton သထုံခေတ် သုဝဏ္ဏဘူမိ
- 400 BC–AD 1057
- Status: Kingdom
- Capital: Thaton
- Common languages: Mon
- Religion: Theravada Buddhism
- Government: Monarchy
- History
  - Founding of dynasty: 400 BC
  - End of kingdom: AD 1057
Preceded by	Succeeded by
Tou Yuan	Dvaravati; Pagan kingdom

The Thaton kingdom, Suwarnabhumi, or Thuwunnabumi (Burmese: သထုံခေတ် [θətʰòʊɰ̃ kʰɪʔ] or သုဝဏ္ဏဘူမိ [θṵwəna̰ bʊ̀mḭ]) was a Mon kingdom, believed to have existed in Lower Burma from at least the 4th century BC to the middle of the 11th century AD. One of many Mon kingdoms that existed in modern-day Lower Burma and Thailand, the kingdom was essentially a city-state centered on the city of Thaton, which today is a small town in the Burmese Mon State. It traded directly with South India and Sri Lanka, and became a primary center of Theravada Buddhism in South-East Asia. Thaton, like other Mon kingdoms, faced the gradual encroachment of the Khmer Empire. But it was the Pagan kingdom from the north that conquered the fabled kingdom in 1057.

== Etymology ==
Mon tradition maintains that the kingdom was called Suvannabhumi (Burmese: သုဝဏ္ဏဘူမိ, literally "land of gold"), a name also claimed by Lower Thailand, and that it was founded during the time of the Buddha in the 6th century BCE. "Thaton" is the Burmese name of Sadhuim in Mon, which in turn is from Sudhammapura in Pali, after Sudhammā, the assembly hall of the gods.

== History ==
According to the Mon tradition, the kingdom of Thaton was founded during the time of the Buddha, and was ruled by a dynasty of 59 kings. The tradition also maintains that a group of political refugees founded the city of Pegu (Bago, which in the 14th century would become the historic capital of the Mon Hanthawaddy Kingdom) in 573. But the historical kingdom probably came into existence some time in the 9th century, following the entry Mon people into Lower Burma from modern northern Thailand. G. E. Harvey's History of Burma, citing the Mon chronicle Shwemawdaw Thamaing ("History of Shwemawdaw Pagoda"), gives the year of founding of Pegu as 825; but even that date remains unattested. Indeed, the earliest mention of Pegu is in 1266, in Old Burmese.

The capital, Thaton, was originally a very active port on the Gulf of Martaban and a center of intense commercial exchanges with southern India and Ceylon, present-day Sri Lanka. Geological changes in subsequent centuries altered the coastline of the gulf, and today the town lies about 12 km from the sea. It is presumed to have been the first kingdom established by the Mon in Lower Burma. Thaton has been credited with introducing Theravada Buddhism to the region. Some scholars maintain that Buddhist manuscripts from Ceylon were translated into Old Mon around 400, a hypothesis disputed by other historians. Inscriptions dating to the 5th century discovered in Lower Burma confirm the presence of Theravada Buddhism in the area at that time.

Traditional Burmese and Mon reconstructions hold that Thaton was overrun by the Pagan kingdom from Upper Burma in 1057. King Anawrahta (a hero of the Bamar ethnic group who first unified most of the country under the banner of the Pagan Kingdom), having been converted to Theravada Buddhism (spread in the region by the Mon and the Pyu) by a Mon monk, Shin Arahan, reportedly asked for the Theravada Buddhist canon from King Manuha of Thaton. The Mon king's refusal was used by Anawrahta as a pretense to invade and conquer the Mon kingdom, whose literary and religious traditions helped to mold early Pagan civilization. According to the chronicles, King Manuha of Thaton surrendered after a 3-month siege of the city by Pagan's forces on 17 May 1057 (11th waxing of Nayon, 419 ME). In the following decades, Mon culture formed the foundation of Pagan civilization. Between 1050 and about 1085, Mon craftsmen and artisans reportedly helped to build some two thousand monuments at Pagan, the remains of which today rival the splendors of Angkor Wat. The Mon script is the source of the Burmese alphabet, the earliest evidence of which is dated to 1058, a year after the Thaton conquest.

There are several archaeological sites attributed to the Thaton kingdom. Suvarnabhumi City in Bilin Township is one such site with limited excavation work. The site, called Winka Old City by other archeologists, contains 40 high-grounds of which only 4 have been excavated. The Winka site, along with nearby walled sites like Kyaikkatha and Kelasa, have been dated as early as the sixth century. While the archaeology of early Lower Burmese sites requires more work, other urban centres in Myanmar like the Sri Ksetra kingdom in modern day Pyay were Buddhist as early as the 5th century.

However, some modern research has argued that Mon influence on the interior after Anawrahta's conquest is a greatly exaggerated post-Pagan legend, and that Lower Burma in fact lacked a substantial independent polity prior to Pagan's expansion. This interpretation aligns with accounts in the Thai source, the Northern Chronicle, which state that the coastal region that identified as the Thaton Kingdom had previously been under the authority of the Monic Mueang Chaliang, from the reign of Arunaraja in the 950s until the region became under the Pagan in 1057.

Whatever the condition of the coast, all scholars accept that during the 11th century, Pagan established its authority in Lower Burma and this conquest enabled Pagan to replace Thaton in international trade with India and Sri Lanka, and facilitated growing cultural exchange, if not with local Mons, then with India and with Theravada stronghold Sri Lanka. From a geopolitical standpoint, Anawrahta's conquest of Thaton checked the Khmer advance in the Tenasserim coast.

The Mon had to wait until 1287 to regain their independence from the Burmese, when King Wareru founded what would become known as the Hanthawaddy Kingdom, taking advantage of the submission of the Pagan Kingdom to the Mongols of Kublai Khan. In the meantime, Thaton had lost its importance, and the new Mon capitals were Martaban and Hanthawaddy, present-day Bago.

=== List of Thaton kings ===
According to the Mon chronicles, the Kingdom of Thaton had a line of 59 kings that begun from the time of the Buddha.

== Art ==
=== Architecture ===
Ancient Thaton is located in the northern part of the modern town, and the few surviving archaeological remains are hidden among newer buildings. The layout of the ancient city was rectangular and surrounded by walls. The royal palace stood in the center and measured 329 metres by 351 metres. Between the palace and the southern walls stood two pagodas, the larger of which was the Shwezayan Pagoda, probably built in the 5th century. The present structure is one of several reconstructions carried out in subsequent centuries. In the courtyard there are 11th-century stone inscriptions in the Old Mon language.

=== Sculpture ===
The few surviving sculptures were executed in different styles and depict a variety of subjects. The deities represented are Buddhist, Hindu or animist. Some Hindu sculptures dating to the 9th–10th centuries were taken to a museum in Yangon that was destroyed by the Japanese during the Second World War; today only fragments and photographs remain. The style adopted in these statues was characteristic of Pyu sculpture.

Inside the Shwezayan Pagoda are statues dating to the 10th–11th centuries. One represents the Buddha standing in the varadamudra gesture, with one hand bestowing blessings and the other teaching; behind him are two hamsa, sacred water birds in the Buddhist tradition and a symbol of the Mon people. The Kalyani Sima temple, located opposite the pagoda and consecrated for the ordination of monks (Pabbajja), contains bas-reliefs depicting scenes from the life of the Buddha dating to the 11th or 13th century.

== See also ==
- Mon kingdoms
- Mon people
- Hanthawaddy kingdom
- Restored Hanthawaddy kingdom
- Indianization of Southeast Asia
