= Min Shin Saw =

Min Shin Saw မင်းရှင်စော

King of Burma (Consecrated)
- Reign: 1167 (less than one day)
- Predecessor: Sithu I
- Successor: Narathu

Heir-apparent of Burma
- Reign: c. 1117–1151
- Predecessor: Sithu I
- Successor: Narathu (as heir-presumptive)
- Born: c. 1117; Pagan (Bagan)
- Died: 1167; Pagan (Bagan)
- House: Pagan
- Father: Sithu I
- Mother: Yadanabon
- Religion: Theravada Buddhism

Min Shin Saw (Burmese: မင်းရှင်စော, pronounced [mɪ́ɰ̃ ʃɪ̀ɰ̃ sɔ́]; c. 1117 – 1167) was the heir-apparent of the Pagan Dynasty of Burma (Myanmar) from c. 1117 to 1151. His father King Sithu I sent the crown prince into exile to present-day Ava (Inwa) which the prince subsequently turned into a highly cultivated region. After Sithu was assassinated in 1167, Min Shin Saw returned to Pagan to claim the throne. There, he was consecrated king but later that night, was assassinated by Narathu, his younger brother and the assassin of their father.

== Disagreements with the king ==
According to the Hmannan Yazawin chronicle, Min Shin Saw had two specific run-ins with his father. In the first incident, the king's newest young queen, a daughter of the king of Pateikkara—a tributary to Pagan, stayed on the royal couch beside the king when the king's sons came to pay homage to him. Min Shin Saw refused to kneel down in front of the young queen whose name was Pabhavati. He said: "I'm the eldest son. Shall this Kala wench abide in the couch in my presence before all the ministers and councilors?" He left, saying "I'm not well." (Kala today means Indian but may have meant foreign in those days. Pateikkara is believed to be a kingdom near today's Chin State.)

In the second incident, Alaungsithu awarded a royal attendant named Ananda Thuriya a robe of princely attire, worn only by princes. When the attendant showed up wearing the robe at the royal council, Min Shin Saw stripped the robe off Ananda Thuriya, saying: "This garment is not for a king's usher or nurse to wear. Only the king's brothers and sons are worthy to wear it." The old king was greatly disturbed that Min Shin Saw was acting like a king even when the king was still alive.

== Life in exile ==
In 1151/1152, the king first sent Min Shin Saw to prison but at the intervention of his mother Queen Yadanabon, reduced the sentence and sent him to exile. The prince and his followers settled near today's Ava, a few miles northeast of Pagan. The prince dammed the Aung Pinle Lake, and another lake nearby. He built three canals, creating additional cultivated land. Because the land was fertile, three crops a year were raised. Min Shin Saw's enlightened policies raised funds for his treasury, and attracted a host of followers. He invited scholars and monks to write many books and teach them.

Despite his success in exile, the prince remained loyal to his father. At Pagan, however, Alaungsithu had chosen Narathu as the heir-apparent.

== Return to Pagan and death ==
In 1167, Alaungsithu fell ill and was assassinated by Narathu who could not wait to be king. Min Shin Saw did not know about Narathu's treachery, and came back to Pagan to claim the throne. Narathu met him at the port, and proclaimed his elder brother the new king. Min Shin Saw was at once consecrated king. But later that night, Narathu poisoned Min Shin Saw, and claimed the throne for himself.

== Bibliography ==
- Coedès, George (1968). Walter F. Vella (ed.). The Indianized States of Southeast Asia. trans.Susan Brown Cowing. University of Hawaii Press. ISBN 978-0-8248-0368-1.
- Maha Sithu (1798). Myint Swe; Kyaw Win; Thein Hlaing (eds.). Yazawin Thit (in Burmese). Vol. 1–3 (2012, 2nd printing ed.). Yangon: Ya-Pyei Publishing.
- Pe, Maung Tin; G.H. Luce. The Glass Palace Chronicle of the Kings of Burma (1960 ed.). Yangon: Rangoon University Press.
- Phayre, Lt. Gen. Sir Arthur P. (1883). History of Burma (1967 ed.). London: Susil Gupta.

Min Shin Saw Pagan Dynasty Born: c. 1117 Died: 1167
Regnal titles
Preceded by Sithu I	King of Burma (Consecrated); 1167 (less than one day)	Succeeded by Narathu
Royal titles
Preceded by Sithu I	Heir to the Burmese Throne c. 1117–1151	Succeeded by Narathu
