= 1296 =

1296 in various calendars
- Gregorian calendar: 1296; MCCXCVI
- Ab urbe condita: 2049
- Armenian calendar: 745; ԹՎ ՉԽԵ
- Assyrian calendar: 6046
- Balinese saka calendar: 1217–1218
- Bengali calendar: 702–703
- Berber calendar: 2246
- English Regnal year: 24 Edw. 1 – 25 Edw. 1
- Buddhist calendar: 1840
- Burmese calendar: 658
- Byzantine calendar: 6804–6805
- Chinese calendar: 乙未年 (Wood Goat); 3993 or 3786 — to — 丙申年 (Fire Monkey); 3994 or 3787
- Coptic calendar: 1012–1013
- Discordian calendar: 2462
- Ethiopian calendar: 1288–1289
- Hebrew calendar: 5056–5057
- Hindu calendars
- Vikram Samvat: 1352–1353
- Shaka Samvat: 1217–1218
- Kali Yuga: 4396–4397
- Holocene calendar: 11296
- Igbo calendar: 296–297
- Iranian calendar: 674–675
- Islamic calendar: 695–696
- Japanese calendar: Einin 4 (永仁４年)
- Javanese calendar: 1207–1208
- Julian calendar: 1296; MCCXCVI
- Korean calendar: 3629
- Minguo calendar: 616 before ROC 民前616年
- Nanakshahi calendar: −172
- Thai solar calendar: 1838–1839
- Tibetan calendar: ཤིང་མོ་ལུག་ལོ་ (female Wood-Sheep); 1422 or 1041 or 269 — to — མེ་ཕོ་སྤྲེ་ལོ་ (male Fire-Monkey); 1423 or 1042 or 270

Year 1296 (MCCXCVI) was a leap year starting on Sunday of the Julian calendar.

== Events ==
=== January–December ===
- February 5 – Pope Boniface VIII issues the papal bull, Clericis laicos, stating that, without authority from the Holy See, Kings and other monarchs couldn't take income from the church. This bull was made in retaliation against King Philip IV raising taxes on the church
- March 30 – Capture of Berwick: King Edward I of England storms and captures Berwick-upon-Tweed, sacking what is at this time a Scottish border town, with much bloodshed. He slaughters most of the residents, including those who flee to the churches.
- April 12 – King Mangrai the Great of Ngoenyang establishes a new capital by founding Chiangmai, and founds the Mangrai Dynasty, that will rule the Lanna Kingdom of Chiangmai from 1296 to 1578 (the 700th Anniversary Stadium will be built in remembrance of this foundation).
- April 27 – Battle of Dunbar: John Balliol's Scottish army is defeated by an English army commanded by John de Warenne, 6th Earl of Surrey.
- July 20 – Jalal ud din Firuz Khalji dies, and his nephew and son-in-law Ala-Ud-Din-Khalji comes to the throne of the Delhi Sultanate in Hindustan, becoming the most powerful ruler of his dynasty.
- October 21 – The formal coronation of Alauddin Khalji as Sultan of Delhi takes place, and he takes the regnal name Muhammad Shah I.

=== Date unknown ===
- Boniface of Verona expels the Byzantines from their last remaining strongholds on Euboea.
- Chinese diplomat Zhou Daguan spends a year at the court of Khmer King Indravarman III at Angkor, and pens a journal setting forth his observations.
- approximate date – Tarabya, self-proclaimed king of Pegu, is defeated in single combat on war elephants by Wareru.

== Births ==
- August 10 – "Blind" King John I of Bohemia (d. 1346)
- December – Marjorie Bruce, Scottish princess, only daughter of Robert I of Scotland (d. 1316)
- date unknown
  - Charles of Taranto (d. 1315)
  - Gregory Palamas, Archbishop of Thessalonica (d. 1359)
  - Roland of Sicily, Italian nobleman (d. 1361)
  - Walter Stewart, 6th High Steward of Scotland (d. 1327)
- probable
  - Algirdas, ruler of Lithuania (d. 1377)
  - Blanche of Burgundy, queen consort of France (d. 1326)
  - Shi Naian, Chinese author (d. 1370)
  - Tamagusuku, ruler of Chuzan

== Deaths ==
- February 8 – King Przemysł II of Poland (b. 1257)
- March 11 – John le Romeyn, Archbishop of York
- March 24 – Odon de Pins, French Grand Master of the Knights Hospitaller
- May – William de Valence, 1st Earl of Pembroke
- May 17 – Agnes of Bohemia, Duchess of Austria (b. 1269)
- May 19 – Pope Celestine V (b. 1215)
- June 5 – Edmund Crouchback, 1st Earl of Lancaster, son of Henry III of England (b. 1245)
- June 27 – Count Floris V of Holland (b. 1254)
- August 7 – Heinrich II von Rotteneck, prince-bishop of Regensburg
- August 9 – Count Hugh of Brienne, French crusader
- October 9 – Louis III, Duke of Bavaria (b. 1269)
- November 1 – Guillaume Durand, French canonist and writer
- December
  - Isabella of Mar, Scottish countess, spouse of King Robert the Bruce of Scotland
  - Adam de Darlington, Bishop of Caithness (approximate date)
- date unknown
  - Philippe de Rémi, French lawyer and royal official (b. c. 1247)
  - Campanus of Novara, Italian astronomer and mathematician (b. c. 1220)
  - Dnyaneshwar, Hindu saint and poet (b. 1275)
  - Jalal ud din Firuz Khalji, founder of the Khalji dynasty in India
  - Tarabya of Pegu, self-proclaimed ruler
  - Robert de Vere, 5th Earl of Oxford (b. c.1240)
