= Hnin =

Hnin is a Burmese name that may refer to the following notable people:

- Khine Hnin Wai (born 1981), Burmese actress, philanthropist, and an activist for victims of child rape
- May Hnin Thwe-Da, 13th-century Burmese woman
- Mya Hnin Yee Lwin (born 1987), Burmese television and film actress
- Khin Hnin Yu (1925–2003), Burmese writer
- Wai Hnin Pwint Thon (born 1989), Burmese activist based in London
- Hnin Mya (1887–1974), Burmese politician
- Khin Hnin Kyi Thar (born 1986), Burmese philanthropist, journalist and writer
- May Hnin Theindya, principal queen consort of King Tarabya of Pegu
- Hnin Thway Yu Aung (born 1996), Burmese model and beauty queen
- Hnin U Yaing (c. 1260s – 1310s), princess of Martaban
- May Hnin Htapi, 14th-century Burmese woman
