= May Hnin Theindya =

Queen consort of Pegu
- Tenure: c. 1293 – c. 1296
- Predecessor: unknown
- Successor: vacant
- Born: c. 1281; Tagaw Wun; Pagan Empire
- Died: Unknown; Martaban (Mottama)? Martaban Kingdom
- Spouse: Tarabya of Pegu
- Issue: Shin Gyi; Shin Nge
- House: Wareru
- Father: Wareru
- Mother: May Hnin Thwe-Da
- Religion: Theravada Buddhism

May Hnin Theindya (Burmese: မေနှင်းသိန်ဒျာ, Burmese pronunciation: [mè n̥ɪ́ɴ θèiɴdjà]) was a principal queen consort of King Tarabya of Pegu (Bago) from c. 1293 to 1296. She was the only known child of King Wareru of Martaban, and may have been a granddaughter of King Ram Khamhaeng of Sukhothai.

Theindya was torn between her husband and her father, who were rival strongmen in present-day Lower Myanmar. It was she who told her father of Tarabya's plan to assassinate him c. 1296. But when her father ordered Tarabya's execution, she unsuccessfully tried to save her husband.

== Early life ==
Theindya was born c. 1281 to Princess May Hnin Thwe-Da of Sukhothai and her commoner husband Ma Gadu in Tagaw Wun, then part of the Pagan Empire. According to Mon chronicles, her mother was a daughter of King Ram Khamhaeng of Sukhothai, who had eloped with Gadu, then a foreign-born captain of royal elephant stables at the Sukhothai palace. (However, the narrative may be a legend, or "a trope" to link the early kings of Martaban and those of Siam, and may not be historical.)

== Queen consort of Pegu ==
Whatever her parents' origins may have been, Theindya became a princess of Martaban in 1287. That year, her father, who had seized the provincial governorship of Martaban (Mottama) a few years earlier, declared independence from Pagan, and proclaimed himself king. About six years later, her father, now known by the royal style of Wareru, married Theindya off to Tarabya of Pegu, the strongman and self-proclaimed king of Pegu (Bago), the region immediately north of Martaban. Wareru also married Tarabya's daughter Shin Saw Hla in double marriages of state.

Theindya and Tarabya had two sons before the alliance between her father and her husband ended acrimoniously c. 1296. Her father defeated her husband, and became the sole ruler of the three Mon-speaking regions of Lower Burma. Although Wareru spared Tarabya's life, Tarabya was soon discovered plotting an attempt on Wareru. It was Theindya that overheard the plot and reported it to her father. But when her father ordered Tarabya's execution, she tied her tresses with his and dared executioners to cut off his head. It did not work; the executioners managed to cut his hair off, and beheaded him.

== Epilogue ==
It was the last mention of Theindya in the chronicle Razadarit Ayedawbon. The chronicle states that Wareru brought up Shin Gyi and Shin Nge, the two young sons of Tarabya and Theindya. But the boys held a grudge against their grandfather for the father's death. In January 1307, they stabbed their unsuspecting grandfather to death. The boys were caught, and executed.

== Bibliography ==
- Aung-Thwin, Michael A. (2017). Myanmar in the Fifteenth Century. Honolulu: University of Hawai'i Press. ISBN 978-0-8248-6783-6.
- Coedès, George (1968). Walter F. Vella (ed.). The Indianized States of Southeast Asia. trans.Susan Brown Cowing. University of Hawaii Press. ISBN 978-0-8248-0368-1.
- Harvey, G. E. (1925). History of Burma: From the Earliest Times to 10 March 1824. London: Frank Cass & Co. Ltd.
- Pan Hla, Nai (1968). Razadarit Ayedawbon (in Burmese) (8th printing, 2005 ed.). Yangon: Armanthit Sarpay.
- Phayre, Lt. Gen. Sir Arthur P. (1883). History of Burma (1967 ed.). London: Susil Gupta.

May Hnin Theindya Wareru Dynasty Born: c. 1281
Royal titles
Unknown	Queen consort of Pegu c. 1293 – c. 1296	Vacant
