= Wareru Dhammathat =

Legal treatise of Myanmar

- Author: Royal Legal Commission of Martaban
- Original title: King Wagaru's Manu Dhammasattham
- Translator: Emanuel Forchhammer
- Language: Mon (original); Translations: Burmese, Pali, Siamese, English
- Series: Burmese chronicles
- Genre: Dhammathat
- Publisher: Martaban Kingdom
- Publication date: c. 1290/91 c. 652 ME
- Publication place: Martaban Kingdom
- English publication date: 1892
- Media type: print
- Pages: 117

The Wareru Dhammathat (Burmese: ဝါရီရူး ဓမ္မသတ်, pronounced [wàɹíjú dəməθaʔ]; also known as Wagaru Dhammathat or Code of Wareru) is one of the oldest extant dhammathats (legal treatises) of Myanmar (Burma). It was compiled in the 1290s in Mon at the behest of King Wareru of Martaban. Modeled after the Hindu legal treatise Manusmriti, the Code expounds mostly Pagan era Burmese customary law; it contains less than 5% of the content of the Manusmriti.

The Code was the basic law of the Mon-speaking kingdom until the mid-16th century when it was adopted by the conquering First Toungoo Empire. Translated into Burmese, Pali and Siamese, it became the basic law of the empire. The Code was adapted into the later dhammathats of the successor states of the empire. In Siam, the Code coexisted alongside other Siamese legal codes, and became the core portion of the Siamese Legal Code of 1805. In Burma, the Code was revised "to support Burmese customary law with explicitly Buddhist scriptural justifications" by 1640.

== History ==
=== Compilation ===
The dhammathat was compiled at the behest of King Wareru (Wagaru) of Martaban, c. 1290/91. (Note: The chronicle Mon Yazawin (Mon Yazawin 1922: 39) says the law book was compiled after Wareru had completed three years of reign and two years before he received a white elephant from the king of Sukhothai; the narrative points to late 1290 or early 1291. (Huxley 1990: 45) dates the dhammathat to c. 1272 when Huxley says Wagaru [Wareru] was king. Huxley's date is most likely a typographical error since all the chronicles and historians say Wareru became the strongman of Martaban only in the 1280s; Huxley may have meant c. 1292.) Wareru, who had proclaimed king of what used to be the Martaban province of the Pagan Empire only since 1287, set out to compile a customary law book in Mon, the main language of his nascent kingdom. He appointed a royal commission, which returned with the legal treatise that came to be known as Wareru Dhammathat and Wagaru Dhammathat ("Code of Wareru/Wagaru"). The compilation was part of a wider regional pattern in which the former lands of the empire as well as its neighboring states produced legal texts modeled after Pagan's, between 1275 and 1317. (Note: (Huxley 2005: 62): Between 1275 and 1317, five Tai kingdoms—three of which were part of the Pagan Empire; the other two in present-day Thailand—produced or used law texts modeled after Pagan's texts.)

=== Influences ===
The Code is in part based on the 12th century Pagan period law treatise Dhammavisala Dhammathat. It is mainly Burmese customary law, tempered with Buddhist justifications, and organized in the mold of the ancient Hindu Manusmriti treatise. Like the Manusmriti, it is organized in 18 chapters, and justifies the law as given by Manu, "a sort of Moses-cum-Noah figure who was the first law-giver". But the similarities are superficial. The Code's 18 chapters are not identical to those of the Manusmriti; (Note: (Huxley 1990: 47): "The impression is of Burmese authors who have heard of the Indian tradition of 18 heads, rather than of authors who are writing with a copy of the 'Indian work' open on their desk.") and its Manu is not the first man of Hindu tradition but a yathei, "who saw the law-book written in large letters on the boundary wall of the world, and recited it to King Maha Sammata," the first king of the world in Buddhist mythology. (Note: (Huxley 2005: 67): "The Burmese have taken a Hindu hero and grafted him to a Buddhist myth.")

Most of the Code is Burmese customary law of the Pagan era. The Pagan customary law itself grew out of the first millennium Irrawaddy valley Pyu and Mon civilizations. According to Huxley's analysis of the four early Burmese dhammathats including the Wareru, the parts borrowed directly from the Manusmriti quantitatively amounted to "between 4% and 5%". Per Huxley, the non-Hindu parts eligible for borrowing amount only to about 10% in any case since "90% of the Manusmriti concerns matters of caste, pollution, ritual, penance that are meaningless in a society unconcerned with caste and uninterested in pollution". The borrowed parts hail from the section called vyavahāra while the discarded parts include Hindu rites and sacraments, purifications and penances as well as marriage, animal sacrifice and "ideas of a sacerdotal nature". (Note: (Jayatilleke 1967: 545): The dhammathat "mentions neither Brahma, nor the Vedas, nor the sacrificial fire, nor any point denoting influence of the Brahmins and of civil and religious institutions peculiar to Brahmanical India." Furthermore, "marriage is not a sacrament but a contract which can be dissolved by mutual agreement or even by the will of either party, and remarriage of women is allowed"; and "both husband and wife have coparcenary rights to the common property.") Nonetheless the Code is not completely free of Hindu influences; for example, it reiterates "to a certain extent" about the "privileges of the higher castes, of Brahmans" in particular. (These parts would later be viewed as problematic, and be written out in the 17th century.)

=== Usage ===
The Code remained the basic law of the Mon-speaking Hanthawaddy kingdom until the kingdom's fall in 1538/39. It was then adopted by the ascendant First Toungoo Empire. It was translated into Burmese and Pali by Shin Buddhaghosa, a monk. (Note: The exact date of translation is not known. (Huxley 1990: 46) assigns Buddhaghosa's translation to the mid-16th century. (Jolly 1885: 292) simply says Buddhaghosa "flourished in the sixteenth century".) The Code was updated in Burmese as Dhammathat Kyaw. It became the basic law of the empire, which grew to be the largest empire in Southeast Asia during the reign of King Bayinnaung (r. 1550–1581). The Code's adoption in the Tai states in the empire may not have been a stretch. The states had already been using Pagan-derived legal texts since the 14th century.

Even after the empire's fall in 1599, the Code lived on—albeit in adapted forms—in the main successor states. In Siam, it coexisted with other legal codes until King Rama I compiled a new legal code in 1805. The new Siamese law's core 18 chapters share "substantial similarities to King Wareru's code", and the new code adds 21 more chapters. In Burma, the Code morphed into a more Buddhist-centric version by 1640. The new treatise often supports Burmese customary law "with explicitly Buddhist scriptural justifications". (Note: (Lieberman 1993: 248): The revision was part of the trend in which "a variety of legal, historical, and genealogical treatises that derived from Hindu or non-Buddhist traditions were rewritten at the Restored Toungoo and early Konbaung courts so as to provide the monarchy with a more explicitly Buddhist character". (Lingat 1950: 20): "Buddhist Law is not the Law of the Dhammathats pure and simple but it is the body of customs observed by the Burmese Buddhists.")

== Historiography ==
The dhammathat was first translated into English in 1892 by Emanuel Forchhammer as "King Wagaru's Manu Dhammasattham". He used a Burmese language manuscript dated 23 September 1707. (Note: The epilogue of the manuscript (Forchhammer 1892: Part I:71; Part II:39) notes that the copying of the manuscript was completed on Tuesday, the 6th waxing of Thadingyut 1069 ME, which actually translates to Saturday, 20 September 1707. The date was most probably Tuesday, the 9th waxing of Thadingyut 1069 ME, which gives Tuesday, 23 September 1707. The Burmese numerals ၆ (6) and ၉ (9) can be mis-copied.) The British colonial period scholars call the Wareru Dhammathat "the earliest law-book in Burma still extant". But the 12th century Dhammavilasa Dhammathat has been identified as "the oldest extant Burmese law text". (Note: (Huxley 2005: 62): Epigraphy confirms that the Dhammavilasa was "written in 12th century Pagan.")

== List of chapters ==
The following is the list of chapters as reported in Forchhammer's 1892 English translation.

Chapter	Name	Articles
Prologue		
I	Contracting of Debts	1–18
II	The Giving and Taking in Marriage	19–32
III	On Divorce	33–46
IV	On Adultery	47–62
V	On Gifts	63–69
VI	The Law of Inheritance	70–84
VII	The Law of Purchase and Sale	85–87
VIII	Deposit of Property	88–89
IX	The Pledge of Property	90–92
X	Division of Property	93–96
XI	On Laying Wagers	97–98
XII	On Hiring for Wages	99–104
XIII	The Law Regarding Two-Footed and Four-Footed Animals	105–113
XIV	Slaves	114–144
XV	The Law of Assault	145–156
XVI	On Slander and False Accusation	157–167
XVII	On the Division and Boundaries of Land	168–172
XVIII	On Theft	173–182
Epilogue		183–194

== Bibliography ==
- Gerry Abbott, Khin Thant Han, ed. (2000). The Folk-Tales of Burma: An Introduction (Illustrated ed.). Leiden; Boston; Cologne: Brill. p. 392. ISBN 90-04-11812-8.
- Aung-Thwin, Michael A. (2005). The Mists of Rāmañña: The Legend that was Lower Burma (illustrated ed.). Honolulu: University of Hawai'i Press. ISBN 9780824828868.
- Forchhammer, Emanuel (1885). The Jardine Prize: An Essay on the Sources and Development of Burmese Law from the Era of the First Introduction of the Indian Law to the Time of the British Occupation of Pegu. Rangoon: Government Press.
- Forchhammer, Emanuel (1892). John Jardine (ed.). King Wagaru's Manu Dhammasattham: text, translation and notes. Rangoon: Superintendent, Government Printing, Burma. p. 117.
- Hall, D.G.E. (1960). Burma (3rd ed.). Hutchinson University Library. ISBN 978-1-4067-3503-1.
- Harvey, G. E. (1925). History of Burma: From the Earliest Times to 10 March 1824. London: Frank Cass & Co. Ltd.
- Htin Aung, Maung (1967). A History of Burma. New York and London: Cambridge University Press.
- Huxley, Andrew (1990). Tadeusz Skorupski (ed.). "How Buddhist Is Theravada Buddhist Law?". The Buddhist Forum. 1. Psychology Press: 121. ISBN 9780728601628.
- Huxley, Andrew (2005). Paul Williams (ed.). "Buddhism and Law: The View from Mandalay". Buddhism: Buddhism in South and Southeast Asia. Taylor & Francis. ISBN 9780415332330.
- Jayatilleke, K.N. (1967). The Principles of Law in Buddhist Doctrine. Vol. 120. Martinus Nijhoff. p. 672. ISBN 9789028615724.
- Jolly, Julius (1885). Outlines of a History of the Hindu Law of Partition, Inheritance, and Adoption. Calcutta: Thacker, Spink and Co.
- Lieberman, Victor B. (1993). Anthony Reid (ed.). "The Seventeenth Century in Burma: A Watershed?". South East Asia in the Early Modern Era: Trade, Power and Belief. Cornell University Press. ISBN 9780801480935.
- Lingat, R. (1950). "Evolution of the Conception of Law in Burma and Siam" (PDF). Journal of the Siam Society. 38 (1). Siam Society Heritage Trust: 13–24.
- Mon Yazawin (in Burmese) (1922 ed.). Yangon: Burma Publishing Workers Association Press. 1785.
