= Wareru =

Founding King of Martaban (r. 1287–1307)

Wareru; ဝါရေဝ်ရောဝ်; ဝါရီရူး
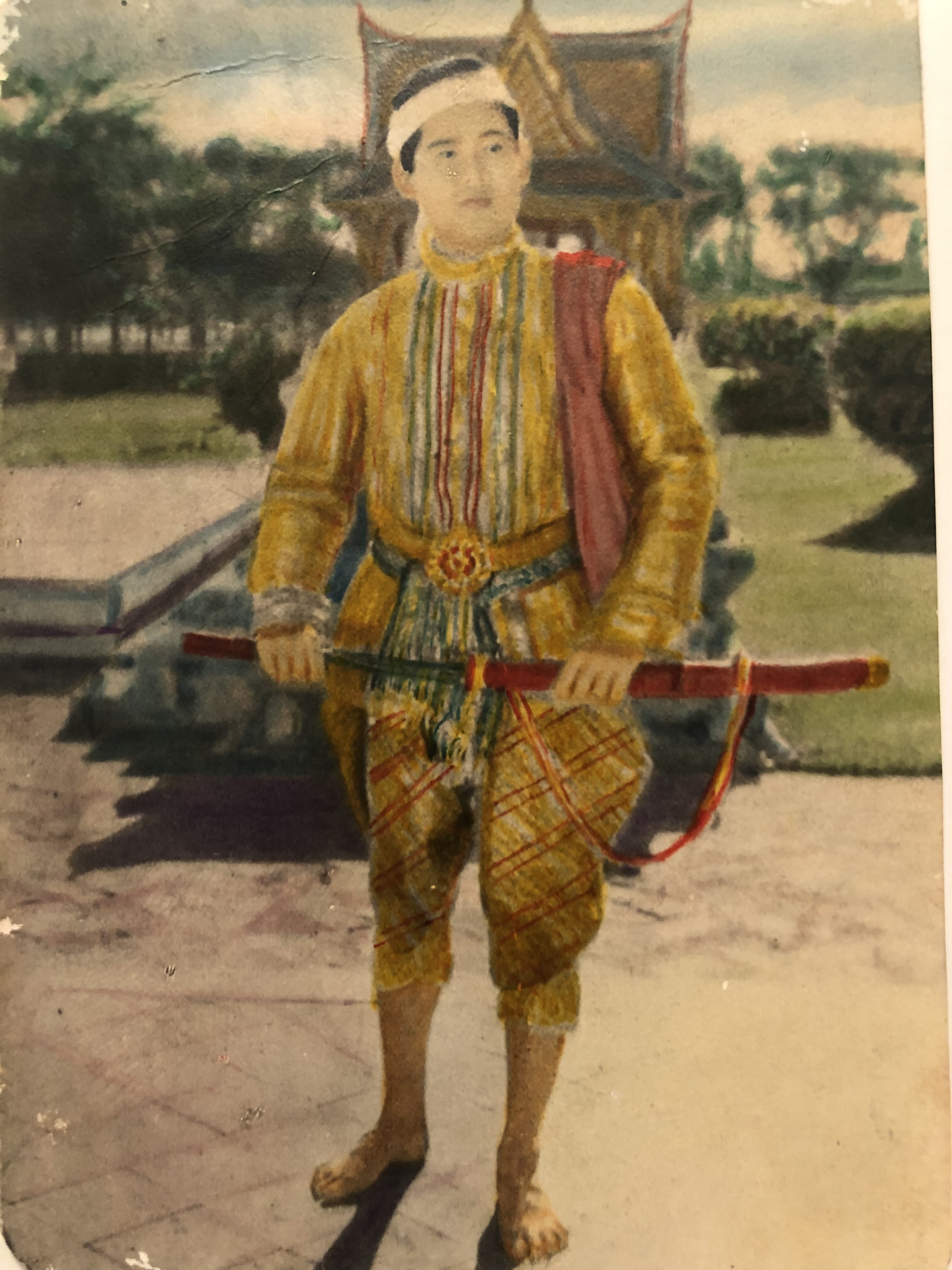
- A modern depiction of Wareru

King of Martaban
- Reign: 30 January 1287 – c. 14 January 1307
- Coronation: 5 April 1287
- Predecessor: New office
- Successor: Hkun Law
- Chief Minister: Laik-Gi (1287–c. 1296)

Ruler of Martaban
- Reign: c. 11 January 1285 – 30 January 1287
- Predecessor: Aleimma (as governor)
- Successor: Disestablished
- Born: 20 March 1253; Thursday, 4th waning of Late Tagu 614 ME; Tagaw Wun, Pagan Empire
- Died: c. 14 January 1307 (aged 53) c. Saturday, 11th waxing of Tabodwe 668 ME; Martaban (Mottama), Martaban Kingdom
- Consort: May Hnin Thwe-Da; Shin Saw Hla
- Issue: May Hnin Theindya
- House: Wareru
- Religion: Theravada Buddhism

Wareru (Mon: ဝါရေဝ်ရောဝ်, Burmese: ဝါရီရူး, Burmese pronunciation: [wàɹíjú]; also known as Wagaru; 20 March 1253 – c. 14 January 1307), personal name Magadu (Mon: သၟိၚ်မဂဒူ ), was the founder of the Martaban Kingdom, located in present-day Myanmar (Burma). By using both diplomatic and military skills, he successfully carved out a Mon-speaking polity in Lower Burma, during the collapse of the Pagan Empire (Bagan Empire) in the 1280s. Wareru was assassinated in 1307 but his line ruled the kingdom until its fall in the mid-16th century.

Wareru, a commoner, seized the governorship of Martaban (Mottama) in 1285, and after receiving the backing of the Sukhothai Kingdom, he went on to declare independence from Pagan in 1287. In 1295–1296, he and his ally Tarabya, the self-proclaimed king of Pegu (Bago), decisively defeated a major invasion by Pagan. Wareru eliminated Tarabya soon after, and emerged as the sole ruler of three Mon-speaking provinces of Bassein, Pegu and Martaban c. 1296. With his domain now much enlarged, Wareru sought and received recognition by Yuan China in 1298.

Although he may have been of ethnic Mon or Shan background, Wareru's greatest legacy was the establishment of the only Mon-speaking polity left standing after the 1290s. The success of the kingdom helped foster the emergence of the Mon people as a coherent ethnicity in the 14th and 15th centuries. Furthermore, the legal code he commissioned—the Wareru Dhammathat—is one of the oldest extant dhammathats (legal treatises) of Myanmar, and greatly influenced the legal codes of Burma and Siam down to the 19th century.

== Early life ==
The future king was born Ma Gadu (Mon: မဂဒူ; Burmese: မဂဒူး, Burmese pronunciation: [mə gədú]) (Note: (Pan Hla 2005: 6, footnote 1 and 8, footnote 1): "Ma" is an honorific for males that means "male or lineage", and roughly equivalent to Burmese "Nga" or "Maung". Gadu in Mon means long conical hat (ခမောက်ရှည် in Burmese).) on 20 March 1253 in the village of Tagaw Wun (near present-day Thaton in Mon State), to poor peasants. His ethnic background was Mon, Shan or mixed Mon and Shan. (Note: Major Mon chronicles do not highlight his ethnicity except for his ethnic Mon name of Ma Gadu although the 16th century chronicle Razadarit Ayedawbon (Pan Hla 2005: 16) mentions him an ethnic Mon in passing when he was in the service of King Ram Khamhaeng's service. (Aung-Thwin 2017: 239): In Thai sources, "his ethnic background is more ambiguous: he is sometimes Shan, and sometimes Mon." However, British colonial period scholars—(Phayre 1967: 65) (Harvey 1925: 110) and (Hall 1960: 146)—asserted that Gadu was Shan. Htin Aung (Htin Aung 1967: 78) as well as the 1972 edition of the Burmese encyclopedia (MSK Vol. 12 1972: 333), were equivocal, saying Gadu was of mixed Shan-Mon background. Modern scholars (Michael Aung-Thwin and Matrii Aung-Thwin 2012: 128) say he was either of Mon or Shan background. (Aung-Thwin 2017: 239): "There may have been good political reasons for claiming that he was Shan by T'ai speakers, and equally good reasons for the Yazadarit Ayedawpon making him Mon.") He had a younger brother Ma Gada and a younger sister Hnin U Yaing. They grew up in their native village, located about 100 km north of the provincial capital of Martaban (present-day Mottama in Mon State), then part of the Pagan Empire.

== Sukhothai years ==
When he was about 19, (Note: (Shwe Naw 1922: 32) and (MSK Vol. 12 1972: 333): In his 20th year = age 19) c. 1272, Gadu took over his father's side business of trading goods with the Siamese kingdom of Sukhothai to the east. He joined a convoy of about 30 merchants, and began traveling to the royal city of Sukhothai. After a short stint, he took a job at the royal elephant stables in Sukhothai, and rose through the ranks to become the Captain of the Stables by the beginning of King Ram Khamhaeng's reign, c. 1279. Impressed by the commoner, the new king awarded Gadu the title of Saw Di-Dan-Ri (စောဋိဋံရည်), or Saw Li-Lat-She (စောလီလပ်ရှဲ). (Note: (MSK Vol. 12 1972: 334): The title has been reported as စောဋိဋံရည် (Saw Di-Dan-Ri), စောလီလပ်ရှဲ (Saw Li-Lat-She) in Mon language chronicles.) befitting an officer in his Household Corps.

According to Mon and Thai chronicles, Gadu repaid by eloping with the king's daughter. By 1281/82, he had become romantically involved with Princess May Hnin Thwe-Da, (Me Nang Soy-Dao; Thai: แม่นางสร้อยดาว, RTGS: Mae-nang Soidao; "Lady Soidao"). So when the king was far away on a military expedition in the south, the couple, with a load of gold and silver, and about 270 of their retainers and troops fled to Tagaw Wun. (According to George Cœdès, this was a legend. Michael Aung-Thwin states that the elopement story is probably "a trope" to link the early kings of Martaban and those of Siam, and may not be historical.)

== Rise to power ==
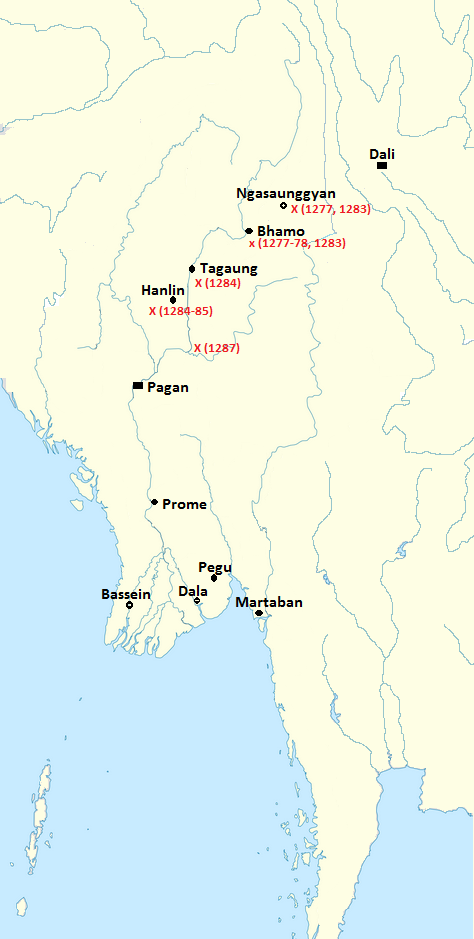
The Mongol invasions of Northern Burma (1277–1287)

=== Chief of Donwun (1281–1285) ===
Back at Tagaw Wun, Gadu with his troops became the chief of the village. Over the next few years, he enlarged the village into a small town named Donwun, and built up defenses around it. (His manpower may have been swelled by Mon-speaking refugees from Haribhunjaya, driven out by Tai king Mangrai.) By 1284/85, (Note: Chronicles report the date of assassination of Aleimma as either 643 ME (1281/82) or 646 ME (1284/85). The 16th century chronicle Razadarit Ayedawbon suggests that Wareru came to power in 646 ME (1284/85) by stating he died in 668 ME (1306/07) after having ruled for 22 years. The Maha Yazawin (1724) says he seized Martaban in 643 ME (1281/82). The Yazawin Thit chronicle (1798) gives 646 ME (1284/85). But the Hmannan Yazawin (1832) reverts to Maha Yazawin's 643 ME (1281/82). However, the Maha Yazawin also states that King Narathihapate died in 646 ME (1284/85), about three years after Wareru seized Martaban. Since, King Narathihapate actually died in 649 ME (on 1 July 1287), Maha Yazawin's dates are off by about 3 years, and its reported date of Wareru's seizure of Martaban should be reset by three years to 646 ME (1284/85) as well. Most scholars (Phayre 1967) (Harvey 1925) (Hall 1960) (Htin Aung 1967) simply follow the Maha Yazawin/Hmannan Yazawin date of 643 ME (1281/82), abbreviating the date as "1281". But (Aung-Thwin 2017: 238) prefers the Yazawin Thit date of 646 ME (1284/85)—it is far more probable for Pagan to be preoccupied by the Mongol invasions in 1284–85 for the first Mongol invasion into northern Burma only began in 1283.) the commoner had set his sights on the governorship at Martaban itself. That a small-time chief like him would contemplate such a move is a testament to the rapidly dissipating authority of Pagan. At the time, Pagan's forces were faring badly against the Mongol invaders, and vassal rulers throughout the country had become increasingly restless. At Martaban, Gov. Aleimma himself had begun planning for a rebellion.

Aleimma's rebellion turned out to be Gadu's opening. When the governor asked his vassals for support, Gadu readily obliged, offering his services and his men to the governor as well as a marriage alliance between the governor and his younger sister, with the wedding to be held at Donwun. It was merely a ploy to get the governor out of Martaban. Surprisingly, Aleimma took the bait, and made a fateful trip to Donwun with a contingent of troops. On the night of the wedding, while Aleimma's guards were drunk, Gadu's men killed them, and assassinated the governor. It was c. 11 January 1285. (Note: Furthermore, the Mon Yazawin chronicle (Shwe Naw 1922: 39) states that the marriage took place on Thursday, 6th waxing of Tabodwe 1064 ME (Wednesday, 6 January 1703), which is a typographical error. If the year were 646 ME, Thursday, 6th waxing of Tabodwe 646 ME = 11 January 1285.)

=== Rebel ruler of Martaban (1285–1287) ===
Gadu went on to seize Martaban, and consolidate his control of the Martaban province. His insurrection was one of several revolts around the country against King Narathihapate of Pagan. The king had already lost the support of his key vassals, including his own sons, who ruled key Lower Burma ports (Prome, Dala and Bassein). Without the full support of his sons, the king did not have enough troops to quell rebellions everywhere. In the south, the king's army never got past Pegu (Bago), which was headed by another warlord Akhamaman, and failed both times to take the town in 1285–86.

Meanwhile, Gadu consolidated his control of the Martaban province. He first rebuilt the fortifications of Martaban, and then conquered Kampalani, (believed to be a small Shan state in present-day Kayin State) whose chief had refused to submit. After Kampalani, all other chiefs fell in line. Gadu was still concerned about Pagan, and sought the backing of his father-in-law. By 1287, a diplomatic mission led by his minister Laik-Gi had successfully secured Ram Khamhaeng's support. The king of Sukhothai acknowledged Gadu as a vassal king, and awarded the royal title of "Chao Fa Rua" (Thai: เจ้าฟ้ารั่ว, "Lord Fa Rua", [t͡ɕaːw˥˩ faː˥.ruːa˥˩])) also reported in Mon and Burmese as "Binnya Waru" (Burmese: ဗညား ဝါရူး, [bəɲá wàjú])) and Smim Warow (Mon: သ္ငီ ဝါရောဝ်).

On 30 January 1287, (Note: Accession date by scholarship (Yazawin Thit Vol. 1 2012: 148, footnote 8): Thursday, Full moon of Tabodwe 648 ME = 30 January 1287) Gadu declared himself king of Martaban. (Note: The kingdom he founded would later be known as Hanthawaddy Kingdom after the capital was moved to Hanthawaddy Pegu in 1369/70. In 1287, he did not yet control Pegu, and his realm was technically the Martaban Kingdom.) He held the coronation ceremony c. 5 April 1287. His royal style later became known in Mon as Wareru. The declaration did not elicit any action by Pagan, which was amidst its death throes. The empire formally fell on 1 July 1287 when the king was assassinated by one of his sons Prince Thihathu of Prome. Two years of interregnum followed.

== King of Martaban ==
=== Early reign (1287–1293) ===
In the beginning, Wareru was just one of several petty strongmen that had sprouted across the former empire. His realm covered approximately modern day Mon State and southern Kayin State. To his east was his overlord Sukhothai. To his south lay the Pagan province of Tavoy (Dawei), which too was in revolt. To his north were Pegu, and Dala, ruled by Akhamaman and Prince Kyawswa respectively.

Situated on the upper Tenasserim coast, Martaban was an island of stability during the interregnum. The multi-party war among the sons of the fallen king in Lower Burma never reached Martaban. The closest it came to was in 1287–1288 when Prince Thihathu the patricide laid siege to Pegu. Even when Prince Kyawswa eventually emerged as king of Pagan on 30 May 1289, the new king had no real army, and posed no threat to Pegu or Martaban. Indeed, Wareru's immediate concern was not Kyawswa but Tarabya, who had gained control of both Pegu and Dala and their surrounding districts. (Note: Royal chronicles (Maha Yazawin Vol. 1 2006: 253) and (Hmannan Vol. 1 2003: 359) say that Tarabya was in charge of all 32 districts of Pegu at Kyawswa's accession.)

Nevertheless, the peace between the two neighboring strongmen held. Each was focused on consolidating his region. At Martaban, c. 1290/91, (Note: The chronicle Mon Yazawin (Shwe Naw 1922: 39) says the law book was compiled after Wareru had completed three years of reign and two years before he received a white elephant from the king of Sukhothai; the narrative points to late 1290 or early 1291. (Huxley 1990: 45) dates the dhammathat to c. 1272 when Huxley says Wagaru [Wareru] was king. Huxley's date is most likely a typographical error since all the chronicles and historians say Wareru became the strongman of Martaban only in the 1280s; Huxley may have meant c. 1292.) Wareru commissioned a dhammathat (customary law book) to be compiled in Mon, the main language of his nascent kingdom. He appointed a royal commission, which returned with the legal treatise that came to be known as Wareru Dhammathat and Wagaru Dhammathat ("Code of Wareru/Wagaru"). (The compilation was part of a wider regional pattern in which the former lands of the empire as well as its neighboring states produced legal texts modeled after Pagan's, between 1275 and 1317. (Note: (Huxley 2005: 62): Between 1275 and 1317, five Tai kingdoms—three of which were part of the Pagan Empire; the other two in present-day Thailand—produced or used law texts modeled after Pagan's texts.))

=== Alliance with Pegu and victory over Pagan (1293–1296) ===
But Pagan was not completely out of the picture yet. It still claimed its former lands. A truce of sorts between King Kyawswa and his three generals was reached in February 1293. Around the same time, c. 1293, (Note: The Razadarit Ayedawbon (Pan Hla 2005: 28–30) says Tarabya came to power seven years after 647 ME (1285/86)—meaning he came to power c. 654 ME (1292/93)—and proceeded to set up an alliance with Wareru by giving each other their daughter. However, (Harvey 1925: 110) says the alliance by the exchange of daughters took place in 1287. But Harvey's date is unlikely since Wareru eloped with his wife-to-be only c. 1281, which means the daughter would have just been at most 6 years old, and since the chronicles say she bore him two children soon after. (Htin Aung 1967: 79) says the alliance took place in 1287 but does not mention the exchange of daughters.) Wareru and Tarabya entered into an alliance as a precaution against a Pagan invasion. In marriages of state, Tarabya married Wareru's daughter May Hnin Theindya while Wareru married Tarabya's daughter Shin Saw Hla.

Still in 1293, Wareru received assurance from Sukhothai of its continued support. King Ram Khamhaeng even sent a white elephant as a symbol of royal recognition to his son-in-law although this open recognition may have forced Pagan's hand to act. In the dry season of 1295–1296 (also reported as 1293–1294), (Note: The Razadarit (Pan Hla 2005: 30–35) includes two seemingly separate invasions by Pagan—the first around or after 654 ME (1292/93), and the second in 655 ME (1293/94). But the narratives are disjointed, and may refer to the same event. The first narrative says the c. 1292/93 invasion took place during the reign of King Narathihapate, which cannot be true since the king had been dead since 1287. The second narrative says the king of Ngawdaw [identified as districts near Pinle, the fief of Thihathu, per (Harvey 1925: 111, footnote 2)] invaded in 1293/94. Furthermore, the standard chronicles do not mention any campaigns to the south during Kyawswa's reign. But the Yazawin Thit chronicle (Yazawin Thit Vol. 1 2012: 150) does mention one campaign to Dala in 658 ME (28 March 1296 to 28 March 1297), which is supported by a contemporary inscription, (SMK Vol. 3 1983: 196, lines 1, 18–19), dated 14th waxing of Thantu (Thadingyut) 658 ME (12 September 1296). The inscription states that King Kyawswa gave rewards to Gen. Ananda Zeya Pakyan for having captured Dala in 658 ME (1296/97). Since the inscription was inscribed on 12 September 1296, during the rainy season, the capture of Dala most probably took place earlier in the year 658 ME (28 March 1296 to May 1296) before the rainy season began. The colonial period scholarship (Harvey 1925: 111) and (Htin Aung 1967: 79) say Pagan was driven back in 1293–1294. But (Aung-Thwin 2017: 25) accepts the inscription's 1296 date.) a sizable Pagan army led by generals Yazathingyan of Mekkhaya and Thihathu of Pinle (not Prince Thihathu of Prome, the patricide) invaded to retake the entire southern coast. The Pagan army captured Dala and laid siege to Pegu. The city was starving when Wareru's troops from Martaban arrived and broke the siege. The combined Martaban–Pegu forces went on to dislodge the Pagan army from Dala, and drive the invaders out of the Irrawaddy delta.

The victory proved decisive. At Pagan, the devastating defeat broke the tenuous truce between Kyawswa and his three brother viceroy-generals. Kyawswa would seek Mongol protection in January 1297, only to be overthrown by the brothers in the following December. The brothers would be preoccupied with the inevitable Mongol reprisal until 1303. In all, neither Pagan nor its successor states would attempt a large scale invasion of the south until 1385. (Note: See (Phayre 1967: 65–68) and (Harvey 1925: 111–113) for summaries of the history of Ramanya to 1385.)

=== Break with Pegu (1296) ===
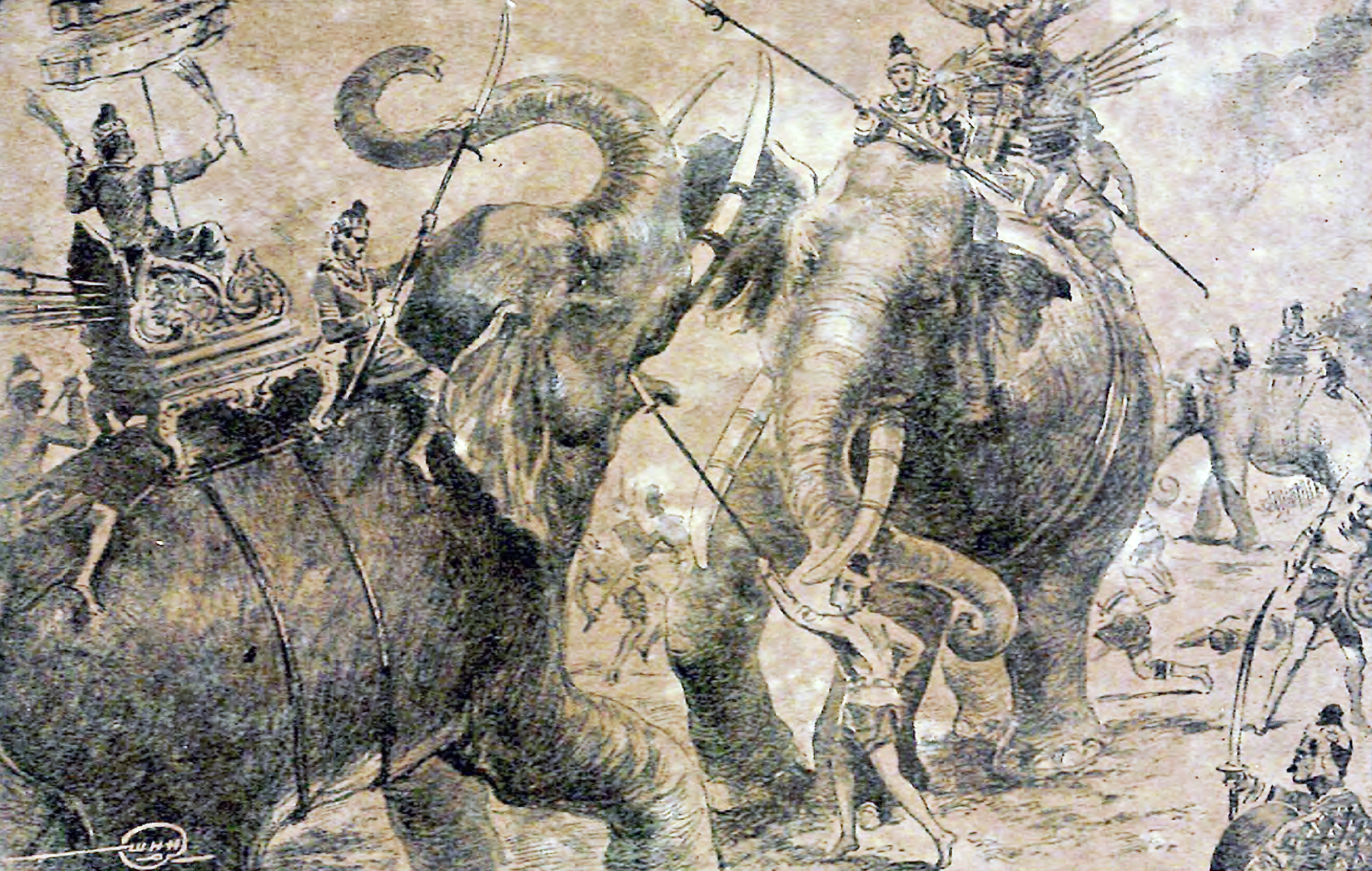
Elephant battle between Wareru and Tarabya of Pegu. Laik-Gi hurt Tarabya's elephant by his lance. An illustration from Rachathirat, a Thai version of Razadarit Ayedawbon. 1946 printed edition.

With Pagan out of the picture, the rivalry between Tarabya and Wareru came back to the fore. The immediate point of contention was the control of the newly won Irrawaddy delta. By late 1296, (Note: Both Slapat (Phayre 1873: 42–43) and Razadarit (Pan Hla 2005: 30–31, 35) say that the two rulers set up an alliance by giving each other their daughter, fought the Pagan invasion, and fought each other right after their victory over Pagan. But the chronicles themselves say that Tarabya and Theindya, Wareru's daughter, had two sons, who later murdered Wareru. This means: (1) the alliance and marriages of state took place at least two years before the Pagan invasion, and the alliance broke up right after the invasion; or (2) the alliance and marriages of state took place right before the invasion c. 1295/96, and the alliance broke up over two years after the invasion (1297 or after).) the relationship had deteriorated to the point of war. The two sides met at the border, and the two lords agreed to fight in single combat on their war elephants. Wareru defeated Tarabya in combat but spared Tarabya's life at the intercession of the monks. He brought Tarabya, Theindya and their two young children to Martaban. But Tarabya was found plotting an attempt on Wareru's life, and was executed.

=== Consolidation of Mon-speaking regions ===
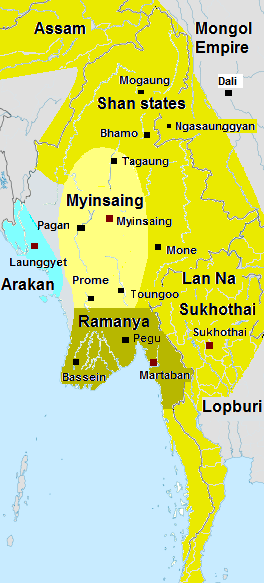
Kingdom of Martaban at Wareru's death

Wareru was now king of three Mon-speaking regions of Lower Burma. He had reconstituted a major portion of Pagan's Lower Burma holdings: the Irrawaddy delta (present-day Ayeyarwady Region) in the west to the Pegu province (Yangon Region and southern Bago Region) in the middle to the Martaban province (Mon State and southern Kayin State) on the upper Tenasserim coast. But he did not control other former Pagan territories farther south such as Tavoy (Dawei), Mergui (Myeik) and Tenasserim (Taninthayi). If he had designs on the southern territories, he did not act upon them. After all, his overlord Sukhothai itself had designs on the Tenasserim coast. (Wareru's grandnephews Saw O (r. 1311–1323) and Saw Zein (r. 1323–1330) would later occupy the lower Tenasserim coast briefly in the 1320s.)

Wareru's immediate acts were to consolidate his rule across the newly won territories. He appointed his trusted minister Laik-Gi governor of Pegu, and his brother-in-law Min Bala governor of Myaungmya in the Irrawaddy delta. Because he did not have a male heir, his younger brother Gada became the de facto heir.

=== Recognition by Yuan China (1298) ===
By 1298, Wareru felt strong enough that he sent a diplomatic mission to Yuan China to receive recognition directly from the Mongol Emperor. It was a bold gesture as his nominal overlord Ram Khamhaeng himself was a Mongol vassal. The Martaban mission passed through Pagan, where they were briefly arrested in March–April. By then, King Kyawswa of Pagan had been deposed by the three generals from Myinsaing. At any rate, the Martaban mission eventually made it to the emperor's court, and received the emperor's recognition in June/July 1298. The Mongols knew that Wareru was then a vassal of Ram Khamhaeng, and recognized Wareru anyway because they did not want a strong state to emerge in Southeast Asia, even of Tais.

=== Last years ===
After receiving Mongol recognition, Wareru reigned for another 8 and a half years. Based on the chronicles' lack of coverage, the years apparently were uneventful. Then in January 1307, the king was assassinated by his two grandsons—the two sons of Tarabya. Despite his having raised them, the boys held a grudge against their grandfather for the father's death. On one Saturday in January 1307, they repeatedly stabbed their unsuspecting grandfather to death. The boys were caught, and executed. The king was only 53. Because he left no male heir, his younger brother Gada succeeded with the title of Hkun Law.

== Legacy ==
Wareru's greatest legacy was the establishment of a Mon-speaking kingdom, which enabled the preservation and continuation of Mon culture. Despite its fragility—after Wareru, the polity devolved into a loose confederation until the 1380s—the Kingdom of Martaban became the only remaining Mon-speaking polity from the 1290s onwards. The older Mon kingdoms of Dvaravati and Haripunjaya (in present-day Thailand) had been subsumed into Tai states of Sukhothai and Lan Na by the end of the 13th century. Wareru's kingdom would not only survive but also thrive to become the wealthiest state of all post-Pagan kingdoms well into the 16th century. The success and longevity of the kingdom aided the emergence of "Mons as a coherent ethnicity" in the 14th and 15th centuries.

His second legacy was the law treatise Wareru Dhammathat (also known as Code of Wareru). The Code was the basic law of the Mon-speaking kingdom until the mid-16th century when it was adopted by the conquering First Toungoo Empire. Translated into Burmese, Pali and Siamese, it became the basic law of the empire. The Code was adapted into the later dhammathats of the successor states of the empire, including Ayutthaya Siam and Restored Toungoo Burma.

== Historiography ==
Various chronicles agree on the general outline of the king's life but tend to differ on the actual dates.

Event	Razadarit Ayedawbon	Pak Lat and/or Nidana	Mon Yazawin (Shwe Naw)	Maha Yazawin and Hmannan Yazawin	Yazawin Thit
Date of birth	20 March 1253 (Note: (Pan Hla 2005: 15): Thursday, 4th waning of [Late] Tagu 614 = 20 March 1253)		c. 1678 [sic]	not mentioned	
Seizure of governorship at Martaban	1284/85 and 1286/87 (Note: The Binnya Dala version of the Razadarit Ayedawbon chronicle provides two different dates. One section (Pan Hla 2005: 35, footnote 2) says Wareru ruled 22 years at Martaban, implying that he came to power in 1284/85. But another section (Pan Hla 2005: 23, footnote 1) says he came to power in 648 ME (29 March 1286 to 28 March 1287).)	1281/82 (Note: (Pan Hla 2005: 23): 643 ME = 28 March 1281 to 28 March 1282)	before 6 January 1703 [sic] (Note: (Shwe Naw 1922: 39): before Thursday, 6th waxing of Tabodwe 1064 ME [sic] = Wednesday, 6 January 1703 [sic].)	1281/82 (Note: (Maha Yazawin Vol. 1 2006: 246) and (Hmannan Vol. 1 2003: 351): 643 ME = 28 March 1281 to 28 March 1282)	1284/85 (Note: (Yazawin Thit Vol. 1 2012: 148): 646 ME (28 March 1284 to 28 March 1285). More likely late 646 ME (early 1285) since Wareru declared independence after the Mongols defeated the Pagan army in the north which per (Yazawin Thit Vol. 1 2012: 148) took place January 1285.)
Declaration of independence from Pagan	19 January 1288 [sic] 30 January 1287 [corrected] (Note: (Pan Hla 2005: 25, footnote 1): Thursday, Full moon of Tabodwe 649 ME = Monday, 19 January 1288 [sic]. Scholarship (Yazawin Thit Vol. 1 2012: 148, footnote 8) corrects it to Thursday, Full moon of Tabodwe 648 ME = Thursday, 30 January 1287)	5 April 1287 (Note: (Pan Hla 2005: 25) reports Thursday, 6th waning of Tagu 648 ME [sic], which is a typographical error. There was no 6th waning of Tagu or 6th waning of Late Tagu in the year 648 ME. The date may have been the 6th waning of Tagu 649 ME [not 648 ME] (Saturday, 5 April 1287), or the 6th waxing [not waning] of Late Tagu 648 ME (Friday, 21 March 1287).)	6 January 1703 [sic]	1284/85 (Note: (Maha Yazawin Vol. 1 2006: 251) and (Hmannan Vol. 1 2003: 354, 358): 646 ME = 28 March 1284 to 28 March 1285)	1286/87 (Note: (Yazawin Thit Vol. 1 2012: 150): 648 ME = 29 March 1286 to 28 March 1287)
Wareru Dhammathat compiled	1286/87	1281/82	3 years after accession	not mentioned	
White elephant received from Sukhothai	1293/94 (Note: (Pan Hla 2005: 34): 655 ME = 29 March 1293 to 28 March 1294)		2 years after the compilation of the Dhammathat	not mentioned	
Alliance with Tarabya of Pegu	in or after 1292/93 (Note: (Pan Hla 2005: 29–30): 7 years after 647 ME (1285/86))		Unspecified date, soon after his accession	not mentioned	
Pagan invasion(s) of Lower Burma	in or after 1292/93 and 1293/94 (Note: (Pan Hla 2005: 35): 655 ME = March 1293 to 28 March 1294)		unspecified date	not mentioned	1296/97 (Note: (Yazawin Thit Vol. 1 2012: 150): 658 ME = 28 March 1296 to 28 March 1297)
Date of death	(7, 14, 21 or 28) January 1307 (Note: (Pan Hla 2005: 36): The king died on a Saturday in Tabodwe 668 ME (7, 14, 21 or 28 January 1307) in his 54th year (at age 53).)		1739/40 [sic] (Note: (Shwe Naw 1922: 44): The king died after 37 years of reign [sic] in his 62nd year (at age 61).)	not mentioned	

== Bibliography ==
- Gerry Abbott, Khin Thant Han, ed. (2000). The Folk-Tales of Burma: An Introduction (Illustrated ed.). Leiden; Boston; Cologne: Brill. p. 392. ISBN 90-04-11812-8.
- Athwa, Sayadaw (1906). "Slapat des Ragawan der Königsgeschichte". Die äthiopischen Handschriften der K.K. Hofbibliothek zu Wien (in German). 151. Translated by P.W. Schmidt. Vienna: Alfred Hölder.
- Aung-Thwin, Michael A.; Maitrii Aung-Thwin (2012). A History of Myanmar Since Ancient Times (illustrated ed.). Honolulu: University of Hawai'i Press. ISBN 978-1-86189-901-9.
- Aung-Thwin, Michael A. (2017). Myanmar in the Fifteenth Century. Honolulu: University of Hawai'i Press. ISBN 978-0-8248-6783-6.
- Coedès, George (1968). Walter F. Vella (ed.). The Indianized States of Southeast Asia. trans.Susan Brown Cowing. University of Hawaii Press. ISBN 978-0-8248-0368-1.
- Hall, D.G.E. (1960). Burma (3rd ed.). Hutchinson University Library. ISBN 978-1-4067-3503-1.
- Harvey, G.E. (1925). History of Burma: From the Earliest Times to 10 March 1824. London: Frank Cass & Co. Ltd.
- Htin Aung, Maung (1967). A History of Burma. New York and London: Cambridge University Press.
- Huxley, Andrew (1990). Tadeusz Skorupski (ed.). "How Buddhist Is Theravada Buddhist Law?". The Buddhist Forum. 1. Psychology Press: 121. ISBN 9780728601628.
- Huxley, Andrew (2005). Paul Williams (ed.). "Buddhism and Law: The View from Mandalay". Buddhism: Buddhism in South and Southeast Asia. Taylor & Francis. ISBN 9780415332330.
- Lieberman, Victor B. (2003). Strange Parallels: Southeast Asia in Global Context, c. 800–1830, volume 1, Integration on the Mainland. Cambridge University Press. ISBN 978-0-521-80496-7.
- Lingat, R. (1950). "Evolution of the Conception of Law in Burma and Siam" (PDF). Journal of the Siam Society. 38 (1). Siam Society Heritage Trust: 13–24.
- Myanma Swezon Kyan (in Burmese). Vol. 12. Yangon: Sarpay Beikman. 1972. pp. 333–334.
- Nyein Maung, ed. (1972–1998). Shay-haung Myanma Kyauksa-mya [Ancient Burmese Stone Inscriptions] (in Burmese). Vol. 1–5. Yangon: Archaeological Department.
- Pan Hla, Nai (2005) [1968]. Razadarit Ayedawbon (in Burmese) (8th printing ed.). Yangon: Armanthit Sarpay.
- Phayre, Major-General Sir Arthur P. (1873). "The History of Pegu". Journal of the Asiatic Society of Bengal. 42. Calcutta: 23–57, 120–159.
- Phayre, Lt. Gen. Sir Arthur P. (1967) [1883]. History of Burma. London: Susil Gupta.
- Shwe Naw, ed. (1922) [1785]. Mon Yazawin (Shwe Naw) (in Burmese). Translated by Shwe Naw. Yangon: Burma Publishing Workers Association Press.
- South, Ashley (2003). Mon Nationalism and Civil War in Burma: The Golden Sheldrake. Routledge. ISBN 9780700716098.
- Than Tun (December 1959). "History of Burma: A.D. 1300–1400". Journal of Burma Research Society. XLII (II).
- Than Tun (1964). Studies in Burmese History (in Burmese). Vol. 1. Yangon: Maha Dagon.

Wareru Hanthawaddy Dynasty Born: 20 March 1253 Died: c. 14 January 1307
Regnal titles
New title	King of Martaban; 30 January 1287 – c. 14 January 1307	Succeeded by Hkun Law
Royal titles
Preceded by Aleimma as Governor	Ruler of Martaban c. 11 January 1285 – 30 January 1287	Succeeded by disestablished
