= May Hnin Thwe-Da =

Chief Queen Consort of Martaban
- Tenure: 30 January 1287 – c. 14 January 1307
- Coronation: 5 April 1287
- Predecessor: new office
- Successor: unknown
- Born: c. 1250s Sukhothai
- Died: Martaban (Mottama)
- Spouse: Wareru
- Issue: May Hnin Theindya
- House: Phra Ruang Dynasty
- Father: Ram Khamhaeng
- Mother: unknown
- Religion: Theravada Buddhism

May Hnin Thwe-Da (Mon: မေဏင်သောဲဍာ; Burmese: မေနှင်းသွယ်တာ, Burmese pronunciation: [mè n̥ɪ́ɴ θwɛ̀dà]; also spelled "မည်နှင်းသွယ်ဒါ", "Mi Hnin Thwe-Da"; Thai: แม่นางสร้อยดาว, RTGS: Mae-nang Soidao, "Lady Soidao") was the chief queen consort of King Wareru of Martaban. The queen was a daughter of King Ram Khamhaeng of Sukhothai. Circa 1281/82, while her father the king was away on a campaign, Princess Thwe-Da eloped with Wareru, a captain of the royal palace guards. The couple fled to Wareru's native Tagaw Wun village (present-day Bilin Township, Mon State in Myanmar), then part of the neighboring Bagan Kingdom.

Her husband later seized the local governorship of Martaban (Mottama). Thwe-Da became the chief queen consort of Martaban in 1287 when her husband officially revolted against Bagan with her father's support. The rebellion was successful, and her husband went on to consolidate all three Mon-speaking regions of Lower Burma in the 1290s.

Thwe-Da and Wareru had at least one daughter, May Hnin Theindya, who later became a wife of Tarabya of Pegu.

== Bibliography ==
- Pan Hla, Nai (1968). Razadarit Ayedawbon (in Burmese) (8th printing, 2005 ed.). Yangon: Armanthit Sarpay.

May Hnin Thwe-Da Wareru Dynasty Born: c. 1250s
Royal titles
New title	Chief Queen Consort of Martaban; 1287 – 1307	Unknown
