= Akhamaman =

Thunekkhat Yaza Akhamaman သုနက္ခတ် ရာဇာ အခမမန်း

Ruler of Pegu
- Reign: 1285 – c. 1287
- Predecessor: new office
- Successor: Lekkhaya Byu
- Chief Minister: Ma Ta-Shauk
- Born: c. 1250s near Pegu (Bago)
- Died: c. 1287; Pegu
- Spouse: unnamed daughter of Ta-Shauk
- Mother: Mwei A-Git
- Religion: Theravada Buddhism

Akhamaman (Burmese: အခမမန်း, (Note: The spelling "အခမမန်း" per (Pan Hla 2005: 27–30). The Mon language spelling in the Slapat Rajawan per (Schmidt 1906: 112) is "အာခမမန်".) pronounced [ʔə kʰa̰ mə máɴ]; also known as Akhamwun (အခမွန်, [ʔə kʰa̰ mʊ̀ɴ]); d. c. 1287) was the self-proclaimed king of Pegu, in modern Myanmar, with the title of Thunekkhat Yaza (သုနက္ခတ် ရာဇာ) from 1285 to c. 1287. He was one of several regional strongmen who emerged during the final years of the Pagan Empire in the 1280s. As the ruler of Pegu, he successfully fended off two attacks by King Narathihapate's forces. After the victory, however, he became deeply unpopular for his increasingly autocratic rule, and was assassinated.

== Early life ==
Chronicles (Note: The chronicles here are the Slapat Rajawan (Schmidt 1906) and (Phayre 1873), and the Pak Lat Chronicles (Pan Hla 2005: 29, footnote 1), which also states that the original Razadarit Ayedawbon chronicle does not cover Akhamaman or his successor Lekkhaya.) report his name as Akhamaman (အခမမန်း; A-Kha-Ma-Man) and as Akhamwun (အခမွန်; A-Kha-Mun). (Note: The Pak Lat Chronicles (Pan Hla 2005: 27–29) and a version of the Slapat Rajawan (Schmidt 1906: 112) use "Akhamaman". The Slapat copy used by (Phayre 1873: 40) uses the name "Akhamwun".) He was a commoner of either Burman or mixed Burman-Mon background. (Note: Arthur Purves Phayre's "History of Pegu" based on the Slapat Rajawan (Phayre 1873: 40) assigns Akhamwun's ethnicity as Burman. It is unclear if his ethnicity is explicitly mentioned in Phayre's copy of the chronicle, or if it was Phayre's conjecture. At least one version of the Slapat as seen in (Schmidt 1906: 113) does not state his ethnicity; it only says that Pagan sent down a governor named Akhamaman. Furthermore, the Pak Lat chronicle (Pan Hla 2005: 27) gives his mother's name as Mwei A-Git, an ethnic Mon name, which suggests that he may have been at least half-Mon.) Born near Pegu, he was educated at a local Buddhist monastery, and initially planned to become an ordained monk. Indeed, he was already a samanera (novice monk) when he left the order to marry a daughter of a local official, Ma Ta-Shauk.

== Royal service ==
It was Akhamaman's father-in-law that got him into the royal service. Ta-Shauk in his official capacity often had to travel to the capital Pagan (Bagan), and wanted his son-in-law to join the service. (Note: (Pan Hla 2005: 27): Ta-Shauk allowed Akhamaman to marry his daughter on the condition that he would join the service.) Initially, Akhamaman repeatedly put off joining the service for the first few years until his father-in-law finally forced him to. He then went to the capital, and eventually became a rower on the royal yacht. It turned out to be his break. The commoner served with distinction, and was noticed by King Narathihapate. He had impressed the king sufficiently that after his term at Pagan was over, the king appointed him as a customs officer at Pegu. It may have been c. 1273. (Note: Per (Aung-Thwin 2005: 59), the earliest extant evidence of Pegu dates only to 1266 (an Old Burmese inscription dated 1266). Per (Phayre 1873: 41), Phayre's copy of the Slapat Rajawan says that Akhamwun [Akhamaman] became king of Pegu in 635 ME (28 March 1273 to 28 March 1274), and reigned two years although Phayre stated that the dates in the chronicle "are not to be depended on." (Pan Hla 2005: 28–29) says that Akhamaman became king of Pegu in 647 ME (28 March 1285 to 28 March 1286), and reigned seven years. (Harvey 1925: 110–112) and (Htin Aung 1967: 79)—assign the date of Pegu revolt in the mid-to-late 1280s, not 1273. The 635 ME (1273/74) date may refer to Akhamaman's appointment as governor, as opposed to his proclamation as king.)

The ex-rower's career continued to rise at Pegu. Though it was a minor appointment—Pegu was still a small town at the time—he nonetheless managed to become the key Pagan official at Pegu in the following years. By leveraging his father-in-law's extensive network in the region, he came to be responsible for not only collecting taxes but also settling trade disputes. By the mid-1280s, when Pagan was fighting a losing war against the Mongol invaders, Akhamaman had emerged as the main political and civic leader of Pegu. With anarchy around the corner, he and other leaders of Pegu decided to build a stockade and a moat around the town.

== King of Pegu ==
By 1285, the Mongol army had decisively defeated the Burmese army in the north. The king fled to Lower Burma, and the country fell into chaos. In Lower Burma, the king found himself isolated. Although his sons ruled the key Lower Burma ports (Prome (Pyay), Dala and Bassein), the king did not trust any of them, and he and his court settled at Hlegya, west of Prome (Pyay). Without the full support of his sons, the presence of the king and his small army impressed no one. When the king called for support from his nominal vassals, Akhamaman and the Pegu leadership saw no reason to respond. Indeed, Akhamaman had proclaimed himself king of Pegu with the title of Thunekkhat Yaza (သုနက္ခတ် ရာဇာ, [θṵnɛʔkʰaʔ jàzà]). (Note: According to Pak Lat (Pan Hla 2005: 28), he came to power in 647 ME (28 March 1285 to 28 March 1286). Slatpat (Phayre 1873: 41) says he came to power in 635 ME (28 March 1273 to 28 March 1274). But (Phayre 1873: 41) itself says that the dates in the chronicle "are not to be depended on".)

To be sure, the self-proclaimed king's realm amounted to just the immediate region around his small town. To his west and south, he was still hemmed in by Prome and Dala, ruled by Pagan princes, Thihathu of Prome and Kyawswa of Dala, respectively. To his east, the Martaban (Mottama) province was controlled by another rebel Wareru. To his north, Thawun Gyi was in charge of Toungoo (Taungoo). Since the king did not control any of their surrounding regions, the Pegu leadership believed that they would be low on the king's priority list, and their defensive preparations progressed slowly. However, to their surprise, the king managed to send a small army to Pegu. When the army showed up at their doorstep, they readily surrendered. They convinced the commander that it had been a misunderstanding all along, and that they remained loyal to the king. Their deception was successful. But later that night, the Pagan general and the staff died from eating the poisoned dried game meat offered to them by Akhamaman's men. After the death of the general, the remaining troops retreated. The king ordered another expedition but Pegu was now ready. The army could not take the well-stockaded town, and had to retreat.

It was Narathihapate's last attempt to regain Pegu. With Pagan out of the picture, Akhamaman increasingly turned autocratic, and became hated by the people. In all, his reign lasted anywhere from two to seven years. (Note: Akhamaman's reign lasted two years per (Phayre 1873: 41), or 7 years per (Pan Hla 2005: 28–29). But the standard royal chronicles—(Maha Yazawin Vol. 1 2006: 253) and (Hmannan Vol. 1 2003: 359)—say Akhamaman's eventual successor Tarabya was in charge of Pegu by the time Kyawswa came to power in Pagan [on 30 May 1289 per a contemporary inscription]. If the standard chronicles are correct, (Pan Hla 2005: 28–29)'s 7 years of reign could be a result of typographical error. The Burmese numeral ၃ (3) can easily be mis-copied as ၇ (7). That means that his reign may have lasted 3 years (until 1288/89), not 7 years (until 1292/93).) He was assassinated by Lekkhaya Byu, one of his brothers-in-law. But Lekkhaya's reign lasted just eight days. Lekkhaya in turn was assassinated by A-Che-Mun, a brother-in-law by marriage of Akhamaman.

== Bibliography ==
- Aung-Thwin, Michael A. (2005). The Mists of Rāmañña: The Legend that was Lower Burma (illustrated ed.). Honolulu: University of Hawai'i Press. ISBN 9780824828868.
- Harvey, G. E. (1925). History of Burma: From the Earliest Times to 10 March 1824. London: Frank Cass & Co. Ltd.
- Htin Aung, Maung (1967). A History of Burma. New York and London: Cambridge University Press.
- Kala, U (1724). Maha Yazawin (in Burmese). Vol. 1–3 (2006, 4th printing ed.). Yangon: Ya-Pyei Publishing.
- Maha Sithu (1798). Kyaw Win; Thein Hlaing (eds.). Yazawin Thit (in Burmese). Vol. 1–3 (2012, 2nd printing ed.). Yangon: Ya-Pyei Publishing.
- Pan Hla, Nai (1968). Razadarit Ayedawbon (in Burmese) (8th printing, 2005 ed.). Yangon: Armanthit Sarpay.
- Phayre, Major-General Sir Arthur P. (1873). "The History of Pegu". Journal of the Asiatic Society of Bengal. 42. Calcutta: 23–57, 120–159.
- Phayre, Lt. Gen. Sir Arthur P. (1883). History of Burma (1967 ed.). London: Susil Gupta.
- Royal Historical Commission of Burma (1832). Hmannan Yazawin (in Burmese). Vol. 1–3 (2003 ed.). Yangon: Ministry of Information, Myanmar.
- Schmidt, P.W. (1906). "Slapat des Ragawan der Königsgeschichte". Die äthiopischen Handschriften der K.K. Hofbibliothek zu Wien (in German). 151. Vienna: Alfred Hölder.
- Sein Lwin Lay, Kahtika U (1968). Mintaya Shwe Hti and Bayinnaung: Ketumadi Taungoo Yazawin (in Burmese) (2006, 2nd printing ed.). Yangon: Yan Aung Sarpay.

Akhamaman Born: c. 1250s Died: c. 1287
Regnal titles
New title	Ruler of Pegu; 1285 – c. 1287	Succeeded by Lekkhaya Byu
