= Hnin U Yaing =

Hnin U Yaing နှင်းဥရိုင်

Princess of Martaban
- Reign: 1287 – 1310s
- Born: c. 1260s Tagaw Wun; Pagan Empire
- Died: by 1319; Martaban (Mottama); Martaban Kingdom
- Spouse: Min Bala
- Issue: Saw O Saw Zein
- House: Wareru
- Religion: Theravada Buddhism

Hnin U Yaing (Mon: ဏင်ဥရိုန်; Burmese: နှင်းဥရိုင်, Burmese pronunciation: [n̥ɪ́ɰ̃ ʔṵ jàiɰ̃]; c. 1260s – 1310s) was a princess of Martaban and the mother of two kings, Saw O and Saw Zein.

She helped her eldest brother Wareru seize the governorship of Martaban (Mottama) in 1285. In 1311, she and her husband, Governor Min Bala of Myaungmya, overthrew her brother, King Hkun Law, and placed their eldest son, Saw O, on the throne.

== Brief ==
U Yaing was born to commoner parents in Donwun, then part of the Pagan Kingdom. She had at least two elder brothers, Ma Gadu and Ma Gada. The siblings were of Shan and/or Mon background. (Note: They had Mon language names. Though none of the major chronicles—the Razadarit Ayedawbon and the Pak Lat Chronicles—says anything about their ethnicity, British colonial scholarship (See: Phayre 1967: 65, Harvey 1925: 110) conjectured that they were ethnic Shans. Later scholars appear to hedge: per (Htin Aung 1967: 78), they were likely of both Mon and Shan backgrounds, while (Aung-Thwin and Aung-Thwin 2012: 118) says they were of either Mon or Shan background.)

According to the Razadarit Ayedawbon, U Yaing played an import role in the rise of her eldest brother's early rise to power. Gadu reportedly used his younger sister's good looks to seize the governorship of Martaban, the provincial capital. Gadu asked U Yaing to choose her bathing place in a river spot strategically, where Governor Aleimma of Martaban would see her. The governor fell in love with U Yaing, and asked to marry her. At the wedding ceremony, Gadu killed the governor, and became the rebel lord of Martaban. Gadu, now styled as King Wareru, went on to declare independence from Pagan in 1287, and to consolidate all three Mon-speaking provinces of Lower Burma by the mid-1290s.

U Yaing rose along with her brother. Wareru appointed U Yaing's husband Min Bala governor of Myaungmya, in the westernmost province. By 1307, when Wareru was assassinated by his grandsons, U Yaing and Bala were entrenched in the delta. They did not respect her other brother, Gada, who succeeded as King Hkun Law. In March 1311, the couple went to the capital and seized the throne while Law was on a hunting trip. Bala's troops subsequently killed Law at the outskirts.

Although Bala initially wanted to ascend the throne, U Yaing objected. Her rationale was that Bala was too old already, and that their eldest son, Saw O, as a nephew of Wareru, would stand a better chance at gaining the support of the vassals. Bala finally yielded to his wife's demand, and Saw O ascended the throne on 10 April 1311. (Bala nonetheless remained the power behind the throne. He built himself a "palace" at a nearby hill, replete with a wing to house his concubines, and lived there like a sovereign.)

U Yaing and Bala both died from old age in the mid-to-late 1310s. (Note: (Pan Hla 2005: 38): Bala and U Yaing both died after their two grandchildren Saw E and May Hnin Aw-Kanya were born, and before 682 ME (1320/21). Since Saw E was born in 1313, Aw-Kanya was likely born in 1314 or later.) The couple had at least three sons, two of whom—Saw O and Saw Zein—became kings of Martaban.

== Bibliography ==
- Aung-Thwin, Michael A.; Maitrii Aung-Thwin (2012). A History of Myanmar Since Ancient Times (illustrated ed.). Honolulu: University of Hawai'i Press. ISBN 978-1-86189-901-9.
- Harvey, G. E. (1925). History of Burma: From the Earliest Times to 10 March 1824. London: Frank Cass & Co. Ltd.
- Pan Hla, Nai (1968). Razadarit Ayedawbon (in Burmese) (8th printing, 2004 ed.). Yangon: Armanthit Sarpay.
- Phayre, Lt. Gen. Sir Arthur P. (1883). History of Burma (1967 ed.). London: Susil Gupta.

Hnin U Yaing Hanthawaddy kingdom Born: c. 1260s Died: 1310s
Royal titles
New title	Princess of Martaban; 1287 – 1310s	Succeeded by
