= Laik-Gi =

Laik-Gi လိုက်ဂီ

Governor of Pegu
- In office c. 1296 – c. 1307
- Monarch: Wareru
- Preceded by: new office
- Succeeded by: unknown

Chief Minister of Martaban
- In office 30 January 1287 – c. 1296
- Monarch: Wareru
- Preceded by: new office
- Succeeded by: unknown

Laik-Gi (Burmese: လိုက်ဂီ, Burmese pronunciation: [laiʔ gì]) was governor of Pegu in the late 13th and early 14th centuries. He became governor of the province c. 1296 after his overlord King Wareru of Martaban had defeated the self-proclaimed king of Pegu Tarabya. Prior to the appointment, Laik-Gi had served as the chief minister of Wareru's upstart Mon-speaking kingdom since its founding in 1287. He also led the diplomatic mission to the court of King Ram Khamhaeng of Sukhothai in 1286–1287 that secured Sukhothai's backing of Wareru's plan to declare independence from the Pagan Empire.

Chronicles do not state when Laik-Gi's term at Pegu ended.

== Bibliography ==
- Pan Hla, Nai (1968). Razadarit Ayedawbon (in Burmese) (8th printing, 2005 ed.). Yangon: Armanthit Sarpay.

Laik-Gi
Royal titles
Preceded by Tarabya of Pegu as king	Governor of Pegu c. 1296 – c. 1307	Unknown
