= Aleimma of Martaban =

Aleimma အလိမ္မာ

Governor of Martaban
- In office c. 1259 – c. 11 January 1285
- Monarch: Narathihapate
- Preceded by: Nga Shwe
- Succeeded by: Wareru

Personal details
- Born: Pagan (Bagan)? Pagan Empire
- Died: c. 11 January 1285; Thursday, 6th waxing of Tabodwe 646 ME Donwun; Pagan Empire

Aleimma (Burmese: အလိမ္မာ, [ʔəleìmmà]) was governor of Martaban (Mottama), then a Lower Burma province of the Pagan Empire, from c. 1259 to 1285. Appointed to the office by King Narathihapate, Aleimma proved a loyal governor of the southern province until the 1280s. But when Pagan was fighting a losing war against Mongol invaders in the country's north, he like other vassal rulers in the south began planning to break away. However, the governor himself was assassinated by a local chief named Ma Gadu, who went on to declare independence from Pagan two years later.

== Brief ==
In the late 1250s, Aleimma was an official at the court of King Narathihapate (r. 1256–1287) in Pagan (Bagan). He hailed from a line of court ministers that included the 12th century Minister Aleimma, who served at the court of King Sithu I. In early 1259, (Note: The Maha Yazawin chronicle (Maha Yazawin Vol. 1 2006: 238) says the king, having reigned for two years, sent two armies to Missagiri and Martaban on Thursday, 6th waxing of Pyatho 604 ME (Sunday, 28 December 1242). The Hmannan Yazawin chronicle corrects the accession year to 617 ME (29 March 1255 – 27 March 1256). But inscriptional evidence per (Yazawin Thit Vol. 1 2012: 139, footnote 5) shows that the king actually came to power in 618 ME, on 6 May 1256 to be exact. Therefore, the starting date of the expeditions should be in December 1258, two years after the king's accession. Furthermore, chronicles (Maha Yazawin Vol. 1 2006: 238)and (Hmannan Vol. 1 2003: 341) continued that the Pagan army took Martaban after an 8-day siege of the city.) Narathihapate appointed Aleimma the younger governor of the restive province of Martaban (present-day Mon State and southern Kayin State in Myanmar). The appointment came after the Pagan army led by Minister-General Yazathingyan had put down a rebellion by the previous governor Nga Shwe.

Aleimma ruled the province on the upper Tenasserim coast without incident for the next 25 years. However, in 1284, when Pagan was faring badly against Mongol invaders, many of the vassal rulers throughout the country, including the king's own sons, began thinking about breaking away. Aleimma was no exception: he began asking his local chiefs to pledge their allegiance to him.

However, he had underestimated the ambitions of local chiefs. He apparently was not suspicious when one of the local chiefs Ma Gadu not only offered his allegiance and men but also proposed a marriage between the governor and his younger sister Hnin U Yaing, with the wedding to be held at Gadu's hometown Donwun. The chronicle Razadarit Ayedawbon suggests that Aleimma was completely smitten with U Yaing after seeing her bathe in the river near Donwun. But it was a setup—part of Gadu's plan to lure Aleimma out of Martaban, and assassinate him. Gadu, who was a former captain of the guards of King Ram Khamhaeng of Sukhothai, had decided to seize the governorship himself, and had ordered U Yaing to bathe in the river where Aleimma would see her.

While the bathing story may not be historical, Aleimma nonetheless accepted Gadu's proposal. In January 1285, the old governor with a small contingent of troops went up to Donwun, about 100km north of the city of Martaban, to consummate the alliance. On the night of the wedding, c. 11 January 1285, (Note: The Mon Yazawin chronicle (Mon Yazawin 1922: 39) states that the marriage took place on Thursday, 6th waxing of Tabodwe 1064 ME (Wednesday, 6 January 1703), which is a typographical error. It should be 646 ME: Thursday, 6th waxing of Tabodwe 646 ME = 11 January 1285.) while Aleimma's guards were drunk, Gadu's men killed them, and assassinated the governor.

== Aftermath ==
After Aleimma's death, Gadu quickly went on to seize Martaban, and consolidate his control of the Martaban province. Two years later, he had secured the support of the Siamese kingdom of Sukhothai, and declared himself king of Martaban, with the title of Wareru.

== Bibliography ==
- Aung-Thwin, Michael A. (2017). Myanmar in the Fifteenth Century. Honolulu: University of Hawaii Press. ISBN 978-0-8248-6783-6.
- Harvey, G. E. (1925). History of Burma: From the Earliest Times to 10 March 1824. London: Frank Cass & Co. Ltd.
- Kala, U (2006) [1724]. Maha Yazawin (in Burmese). Vol. 1–3 (4th printing ed.). Yangon: Ya-Pyei Publishing.
- Pan Hla, Nai (2005) [1968]. Razadarit Ayedawbon (in Burmese) (8th printing ed.). Yangon: Armanthit Sarpay.
- Royal Historical Commission of Burma (2003) [1832]. Hmannan Yazawin (in Burmese). Vol. 1–3. Yangon: Ministry of Information, Myanmar.
- Shwe Naw, ed. (1922) [1785]. Mon Yazawin (in Burmese). Translated by Shwe Naw. Yangon: Burma Publishing Workers Association Press.
- Than Tun (1964). Studies in Burmese History (in Burmese). Vol. 1. Yangon: Maha Dagon.

Aleimma of Martaban Died: c. 11 January 1285
Royal titles
Preceded by Nga Shwe	Governor of Martaban c. 1259 – c. 11 January 1285	Succeeded by Wareru
