= Dhammasattha =

Dhammasattha ("treatise on the law") is the Pali name of a genre of literature found in the Indianized kingdoms of Western mainland Southeast Asia (modern Laos, Burma, Cambodia, Thailand, and Yunnan) principally written in Pali, Burmese, Mon or the Tai languages or in a bilingual nissaya or literal Pali translation (Burmese: နိဿယ). Burmese ဓမ္မသတ် is often transliterated "dhammathat" and the Tai and Mon terms are typically romanized as "thammasāt" or "dhammasāt" (Thai: ธรรมศาสตร์).

"Dhamma" is the Pali-cognate of the Sanskrit-term "Dharma", meaning "law and justice". "Sattha" is the cognate of "śāstra", which either means instruction, learning, or treatise. Dhammasattha texts are historically related to Hindu dharmaśāstra literature from the Indian subcontinent, although they are very significantly influenced by the Theravada Buddhist traditions and literature of Southeast Asia.

== History ==
The word dhammathat is first mentioned in a Burmese inscription from 13th-century Bagan, although it is likely that dhammasattha texts were transmitted there earlier. Certain dhammasatthas claim to have been compiled during the first millennium. There are nine primary Burmese dhammathats, namely the Manu and Dhammavisala Dhammathats of the Pagan Kingdom, the Wareru Dhammathat (1270), Pasedha (1468), Dhammathat Kyaw (1581), and Pyanchi Dhammathats (1614) of the Taungoo Dynasty, and the Myingun Dhammathat (1650) of the Konbaung Dynasty. The first dhammathat mentioned in Burmese chronicles is the Duttabaung Dhammathat, during the time of Sri Ksetra Kingdom.

In Burmese customary law, the order of precedence was mutual arbitration, yazathats, and dhammathat. Burmese dhammathats were supplemented by interpretive guidance in the form of ameindaw (edicts) or pyandan.

There is an extensive tradition of dhammasattha exegesis, particularly in Myanmar. Hundreds of dhammasattha, commentaries, and related legal texts are extant in parabaik (palm-leaf manuscript) form.

== Legal history ==
Dhammasatths influenced a number of Southeast Asian societies prior to the colonial era in matters concerning marriage, theft, assault, slavery, debt, kingship, property, inheritance as well as other issues. In contemporary Burma, although colonial and post-colonial laws predominate, it remains acceptable practice to use dhammathat in law courts in certain areas of family and inheritance law.

== See also ==
- Burmese literature
- Thammasat University, a university in Thailand whose name derives from the term Dhammasattha
