= Mon Yazawin =

17th- or 18th-century Burmese translation of a Mon-language chronicle

- Original title: မွန်ရာဇဝင်
- Translator: unknown
- Language: Burmese
- Series: Burmese chronicles
- Genre: Chronicle, History
- Publication date: c. 1520s (in Mon); 17th or 18th century (in Burmese)
- Publication place: Hanthawaddy kingdom

Mon Yazawin (Burmese: မွန်ရာဇဝင်, pronounced [mʊ̀ɴ jàzəwɪ̀ɴ]; also spelled Mwan Rajawan) is a chronicle that covers most of the Martaban–Pegu period. It is a 17th- or 18th-century Burmese translation of a Mon-language chronicle, commissioned by an unnamed early 16th-century crown prince. It is one of the two extant chronicles with the Burmese name "Mon Yazawin", with the other being a 19th-century translated chronicle by Shwe Naw.

== Brief ==
The subject chronicle of this article mainly covers the Martaban–Hanthawaddy period down to the reign of King Binnya Ran II (r. 1492–1526), and devotes its longest section on King Dhammazedi (r. 1471–1492). Its early sections contain an origins story about the patron saint of the Lower Myanmar Mon named Gavampati.

According to the only extant palm-leaf manuscript of the chronicle, now located in the National Library of Myanmar, (Note: (Aung-Thwin 2017: 221): Number 2290 at the National Library. Kagoshima University has a microfilm copy of the manuscript, catalogued in reels 100–101.) it is a Burmese translation of a Mon manuscript, made by or for an unnamed crown prince, the eldest son of the current king. The manuscript does not state who the crown prince was, who the king was, when the original text was written, who the translator was, or when it was translated. Michael Aung-Thwin's analysis of the Burmese translation finds that the original Mon text was probably written in or around Binnya Ran II's death in 1526; (Note: (Aung-Thwin 2017: 221): The chronicle ends with the reign of Binnya Ran II. If Aung-Thwin's conjecture is correct, the crown prince may have been Yazadipati, who per (Aung-Thwin 2017: 283) briefly succeeded Binnya Ran II for a few hours before dying from unknown causes.) that the translation, based on its use of Burmese, was probably made after the 17th or 18th century; (Note: (Aung-Thwin 2017: 221): The extant Burmese translation uses "modern" tone markers that came into use mainly after the 17th and 18th centuries. However, the translation also contains some older spellings and usages found in both Pagan and Ava period inscriptions, which suggests an even earlier Burmese translation.) and that the chronicle's narrative of King Dhmmazedi suggests its connections to the chronicle Nidana Arambhakatha.

It is one of the two extant chronicles with the Burmese name "Mon Yazawin", with the other so-named chronicle being a 19th-century translation by Shwe Naw. Furthermore, the 18th-century chronicle Maha Yazawin lists a "Mon Yazawin" as one of its sources; but there is no evidence to link that Mon Yazawin to any of the extant Mon Yazawins.

== Bibliography ==
- Aung-Thwin, Michael A. (2017). Myanmar in the Fifteenth Century. Honolulu: University of Hawai'i Press. ISBN 978-0-8248-6783-6.
