= Tarabya of Pegu =

Tarabya of Pegu ပဲခူး တရဖျား

Ruler of Pegu
- Reign: c. 1287 – c. 1296
- Predecessor: Lekkhaya Byu
- Successor: Laik-Gi (as governor)
- Chief Minister: Ma Ta-Shauk
- Born: Pagan Empire
- Died: 1296 or later Martaban (Mottama); Martaban Kingdom
- Spouse: unnamed daughter of Ta-Shauk; May Hnin Theindya
- Issue: Shin Saw Hla; Shin Gyi; Shin Nge
- Religion: Theravada Buddhism

Tarabya of Pegu (Mon: တယာဖျာ; Burmese: ပဲခူး တရဖျား, pronounced [bəgó təɹəbjá]) was the self-proclaimed king of Pegu (modern Bago, Myanmar) from c. 1287 to c. 1296. He was one of several regional strongmen who emerged after the fall of the Pagan Empire in 1287.

Initially, Tarabya was allied with Wareru, the strongman of the nearby Martaban province. But after their decisive victory over Pagan in 1295–1296, the alliance turned into an intense rivalry, which culminated in the two men fighting a duel on elephant-back about two years later. Tarabya was defeated, and after a brief stay in Martaban (Mottama), executed.

== Background ==
Tarabya was originally a commoner by the name of Nga Pa-Mun (ငပမွန်, [ŋə paʔ mʊ̀ɴ]), or A-Che-Mun (အချဲမွန်, [ʔə tɕʰɛ́ mʊ̀ɴ]). (Note: A-Che-Mun per (Pan Hla 2005: 30). (Phayre 1873: 41) transliterates his name as Akhyemwan.) His ascent to power was accidental. He was a brother-in-law of Akhamaman (also known as A-Kha-Mun), (Note: (Pan Hla 2005: 30): Tarabya and Akhamaman were married to the daughters of Ta-Shauk.) the self-proclaimed king of Pegu, who successfully revolted against King Narathihapate in 1285 (Note: The chronicle Slapat Rajawan says A-Kha-Mun [Akhamaman] came to power in 635 ME (28 March 1273 to 28 March 1274), and reigned two years. The chronicle Razadarit Ayedawbon (Pan Hla 2005: 28–29) says that Akhamaman came to power in 647 ME (28 March 1285 to 28 March 1286), and reigned seven years. But Arthur Phayre (Phayre 1873: 41) says the dates in the chronicle "are not to be depended on." Later scholars—e.g., (Harvey 1925: 110–112), (Htin Aung 1967: 79)—assign the date of Pegu revolt in the mid-to-late 1280s, inline with the Razadarit's 1285.) during the Mongol invasions of the country. Two (or three) years later, (Note: Akhamaman's reign lasted two years per the Slapat Rajawan (Phayre 1873: 41), or 7 years per the Razadarit Ayedawbon (Pan Hla 2005: 28–29). But the standard royal chronicles—(Maha Yazawin Vol. 1 2006: 253) and (Hmannan Vol. 1 2003: 359)—say Akhamaman's eventual successor Tarabya was in charge of Pegu by the time Kyawswa came to power in Pagan [on 30 May 1289 per a contemporary inscription]. If the standard chronicles are correct, the Razadarit's 7 years of reign could be a result of typographical error. The Burmese numeral ၃ (3) can easily be mis-copied as ၇ (7). Therefore Tarabya could have come to power 3 years after in 1288/89, or two years later per Slapat in 1287/88.) Akhamaman was assassinated by his brother-in-law Lekkhaya Byu. In response, Ma Ta-Shauk (မတယှောက်), Akhamaman's and A-Che-Mun's father-in-law, recruited A-Che-Mun to eliminate the usurper. Eight days after the death of Akhamaman, A-Che-Mun assassinated Lekkhaya Byu. He declared himself king of Pegu with the title of Tarabya.

== Reign ==
=== Consolidation of Pegu province ===
Tarabya came to power during anarchic times. No central authority had emerged after the assassination of the king by Prince Thihathu of Prome in July 1287. (Note: (Yazawin Thit Vol. 1 2012: 149, footnote 3): King Narathihapate died on 1 July 1287.) The Pagan Empire was no more; every region went its own way. At his accession, Tarabya controlled only around the town. To his west and south, he was still hemmed in by Prome (Pyay) and Dala–Twante, ruled by Pagan princes, Thihathu and Kyawswa, respectively. To his east, the Martaban (Mottama) province was controlled by another rebel Wareru. To his north, Thawun Gyi was in charge of Toungoo (Taungoo).

The frantic fighting among the sons of the fallen king gave petty rulers like Tarabya time to prepare. He reinforced Pegu's defenses while Thihathu fought his brothers Uzana of Bassein and Kyawswa throughout the Irrawaddy delta. By the time Thihathu attacked Pegu, Tarabya was well prepared to withstand a long siege. But Thihathu died in a freak accident during the siege, and Prome forces retreated. Soon after, Kyawswa left Dala for Pagan to become king. Tarabya quickly stepped in, and seized the entire Pegu province, including Dala, by the time Kyawswa emerged as king of Pagan on 30 May 1289. (Note: Royal chronicles (Maha Yazawin Vol. 1 2006: 253) and (Hmannan Vol. 1 2003: 359) say that Tarabya was in charge of all 32 districts of Pegu at Kyawswa's accession. (Than Tun 1959: 119): According to a contemporary inscription, Kyawswa became king on 30 May 1289.)

=== War with Pagan ===
Initially, Tarabya saw no reason to acknowledge the new king at Pagan. Kyawswa had no real army, and the real power increasingly belonged to the three generals, who defeated the Mongol invasion into Central Burma in 1287. Tarabya was more concerned about the local rival next door: Wareru, who then controlled the Martaban province (present-day Mon State and southern Kayin State), and had the backing of the Tai-state of Sukhothai to the east. Nonetheless, c. 1293, (Note: The Razadarit Ayedawbon (Pan Hla 2005: 28–30) says Tarabya came to power seven years after 647 ME (1285/86)—meaning he came to power c. 654 ME (1292/93)—and proceeded to set up an alliance with Wareru by giving each other their daughter. However, (Harvey 1925: 110) says the alliance by the exchange of daughters took place in 1287. But Harvey's date is unlikely since Wareru eloped with his wife-to-be only c. 1280, which means the daughter would have just been at most 7 years old, and since the chronicles say she had two children with him soon after. (Htin Aung 1967: 79) says the alliance took place in 1287 but does not mention the exchange of daughters.) he and Wareru entered into an alliance as a precaution against a Pagan invasion. In marriages of state, Tarabya married Wareru's daughter May Hnin Theindya while Wareru married Tarabya's daughter Shin Saw Hla.

The alliance was timely. Pagan's hand was forced in 1293 when Wareru received royal recognition and the gift of a white elephant from King Ram Khamhaeng of Sukhothai. In the dry season of 1295–1296 (also reported as 1293–1294), (Note: The Razadarit (Pan Hla 2005: 30–35) includes two seemingly separate invasions by Pagan—the first around or after 654 ME (1292/93), and the second in 655 ME (1293/94). But the narratives are disjointed, and may refer to the same event. The first narrative says the c. 1292/93 invasion took place during the reign of King Narathihapate, which cannot be true since the king had been dead since 1287. The second narrative says the king of Ngawdaw [identified as districts near Pinle, the fief of Thihathu, per (Harvey 1925: 111, footnote 2)] invaded in 1293/94. Furthermore, the standard chronicles do not mention any campaigns to the south during Kyawswa's reign. But the Yazawin Thit chronicle (Yazawin Thit Vol. 1 2012: 150) does mention one campaign to Dala in 658 ME (28 March 1296 to 28 March 1297). (SMK Vol. 3 1983: 196, lines 1, 18–19): A contemporary inscription dated 14th waxing of Thantu (Thadingyut) 658 ME (12 September 1296) states that King Kyawswa gave rewards to Gen. Ananda Zeya Pakyan for having captured Dala in 658 ME (1296/97). Since the inscription was inscribed on 12 September 1296, during the rainy season, the capture of Dala most probably took place earlier in the year 658 ME (28 March 1296 to May 1296) before the rainy season began. The colonial period scholarship (Harvey 1925: 111) and (Htin Aung 1967: 79) say Pagan was driven back in 1293–1294. But (Aung-Thwin 2017: 25) accepts the inscription's 1296 date.) a sizable Pagan army led by Yazathingyan invaded to retake the entire southern coast. The army captured Dala and laid siege to Pegu. The city was starving when Wareru's troops from Martaban arrived and broke the siege. The combined Martaban–Pegu forces went on to dislodge the Pagan army from Dala, and drive the invaders out of the Irrawaddy delta.

The victory proved decisive. Neither Pagan nor its successor states would attempt a large scale invasion of the south for about another 90 years (until 1385). (Note: See (Phayre 1967: 65–68) and (Harvey 1925: 111–113) for summaries of the history of Ramanya to 1385.)

=== Showdown with Wareru ===
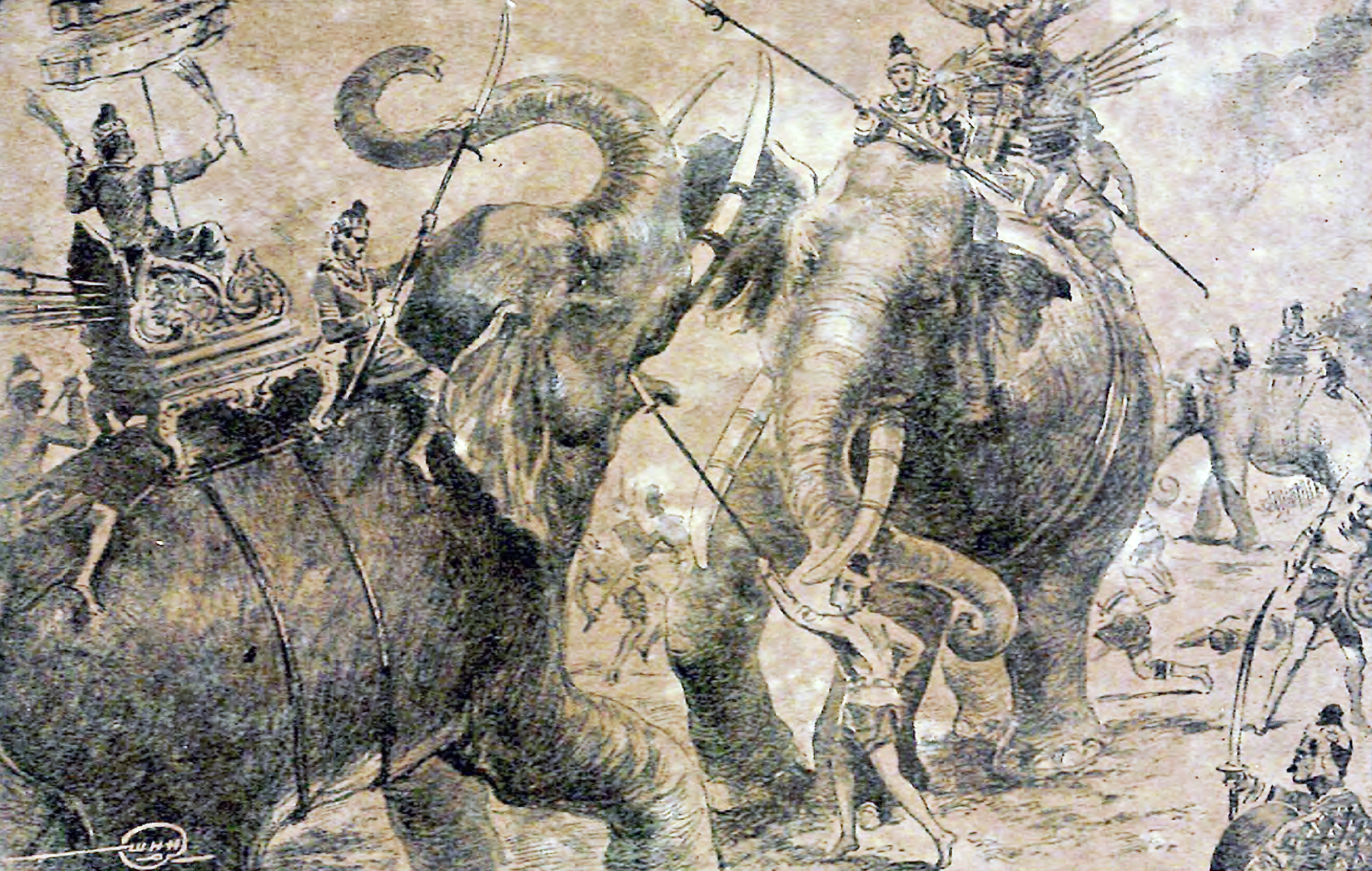
Elephant battle between Wareru and Tarabya of Pegu. Laik-Gi hurt Tarabya's elephant by his lance. An illustration from Rachathirat, a Thai version of Razadarit Ayedawbon. 1946 printed edition.

With Pagan out of the picture, the rivalry between Tarabya and Wareru came back to the fore. The immediate point of contention was the control of the newly won Irrawaddy delta. It is unclear how they decided to rule the delta but the uneasy alliance lasted until late 1296, (Note: Both Slapat (Phayre 1873: 42–43) and Razadarit (Pan Hla 2005: 30–31, 35) say that the two rulers set up an alliance by giving each other their daughter, fought the Pagan invasion, and fought each other right after their victory over Pagan. But the chronicles themselves say that Tarabya and Theindya, Wareru's daughter, had two sons, who later murdered Wareru. This means: (1) the alliance and marriages of state took place at least two years before the Pagan invasion, and the alliance broke up right after the invasion; or (2) the alliance and marriages of state took place right before the invasion c. 1295/96, and the alliance broke up over two years after the invasion (1297 or after).) (The alliance overall lasted at least three years during which Tarabya and Wareru's daughter had two children.) The relationship deteriorated to the point of war. The two sides met at the border, and the two lords agreed to fight in single combat on their war elephants. Wareru defeated Tarabya in combat but spared Tarabya's life at the intercession of the monks. Wareru also appointed Laik-Gi, one of his ministers, governor of Pegu.

== Death ==
Tarabya was brought to Martaban. His wife Theindya and their two young children also came. Soon after, he was found plotting an attempt on Wareru's life, and was executed. According to the Pak Lat Chronicles, it was Theindya who reported the plot to her father. But when her father ordered Tarabya's execution, she tied her tresses with his and dared executioners to cut off his head. It did not work; the executioners managed to cut his hair off, and beheaded him.

== Aftermath ==
Tarabya's two young sons were brought up by Wareru. But the boys held a grudge against their grandfather for the father's death. In January 1307, they stabbed their unsuspecting grandfather to death. The boys were caught, and executed.

== Bibliography ==
- Aung-Thwin, Michael A. (2017). Myanmar in the Fifteenth Century. Honolulu: University of Hawai'i Press. ISBN 978-0-8248-6783-6.
- Harvey, G. E. (1925). History of Burma: From the Earliest Times to 10 March 1824. London: Frank Cass & Co. Ltd.
- Htin Aung, Maung (1967). A History of Burma. New York and London: Cambridge University Press.
- Kala, U (1724). Maha Yazawin (in Burmese). Vol. 1–3 (2006, 4th printing ed.). Yangon: Ya-Pyei Publishing.
- Maha Sithu (2012) [1798]. Kyaw Win; Thein Hlaing (eds.). Yazawin Thit (in Burmese). Vol. 1–3 (2nd ed.). Yangon: Ya-Pyei Publishing.
- Nyein Maung, ed. (1972–1998). Shay-haung Myanma Kyauksa-mya [Ancient Burmese Stone Inscriptions] (in Burmese). Vol. 1–5. Yangon: Archaeological Department.
- Pan Hla, Nai (1968). Razadarit Ayedawbon (in Burmese) (8th printing, 2005 ed.). Yangon: Armanthit Sarpay.
- Phayre, Major-General Sir Arthur P. (1873). "The History of Pegu". Journal of the Asiatic Society of Bengal. 42. Calcutta: 23–57, 120–159.
- Phayre, Lt. Gen. Sir Arthur P. (1883). History of Burma (1967 ed.). London: Susil Gupta.
- Royal Historical Commission of Burma (1832). Hmannan Yazawin (in Burmese). Vol. 1–3 (2003 ed.). Yangon: Ministry of Information, Myanmar.
- Schmidt, P.W. (1906). "Slapat des Ragawan der Königsgeschichte". Die äthiopischen Handschriften der K.K. Hofbibliothek zu Wien (in German). 151. Vienna: Alfred Hölder.
- Sein Lwin Lay, Kahtika U (1968). Mintaya Shwe Hti and Bayinnaung: Ketumadi Taungoo Yazawin (in Burmese) (2006, 2nd printing ed.). Yangon: Yan Aung Sarpay.
- Than Tun (December 1959). "History of Burma: A.D. 1300–1400". Journal of Burma Research Society. XLII (II).

Tarabya of Pegu Died: c. 1296
Regnal titles
Preceded by Lekkhaya Byu	Ruler of Pegu c. 1287 – c. 1296	Succeeded by Laik-Gi as governor
