= Shin Saw Hla =

Shin Saw Hla ရှင်စောလှ

Queen Consort of Martaban
- Tenure: c. 1293 – c. 14 January 1307
- Predecessor: new office
- Successor: unknown
- Born: 1270s? Pegu (Bago); Pagan Empire
- Died: Unknown; Martaban (Mottama)? Martaban Kingdom
- Spouse: Wareru
- Father: Tarabya of Pegu
- Religion: Theravada Buddhism

Shin Saw Hla (Burmese: ရှင်စောလှ, [ʃɪ̀ɴ sɔ́ l̥a̰]) was a principal queen consort of King Wareru of Martaban. She became Wareru's wife c. 1293 when her father Tarabya of Pegu, and Wareru entered into an alliance by marrying each other's daughter.

The alliance fell apart a few years later c. 1296 when her husband defeated and executed her father. Nonetheless, she apparently remained a queen consort of Wareru since chronicles do not explicitly say that she was removed from position.

== Bibliography ==
- Pan Hla, Nai (1968). Razadarit Ayedawbon (in Burmese) (8th printing, 2005 ed.). Yangon: Armanthit Sarpay.

Shin Saw Hla Wareru Dynasty
Royal titles
Unknown	Queen Consort of Martaban c. 1293 – c. 14 January 1307	Unknown
