= List of rulers of Pegu =

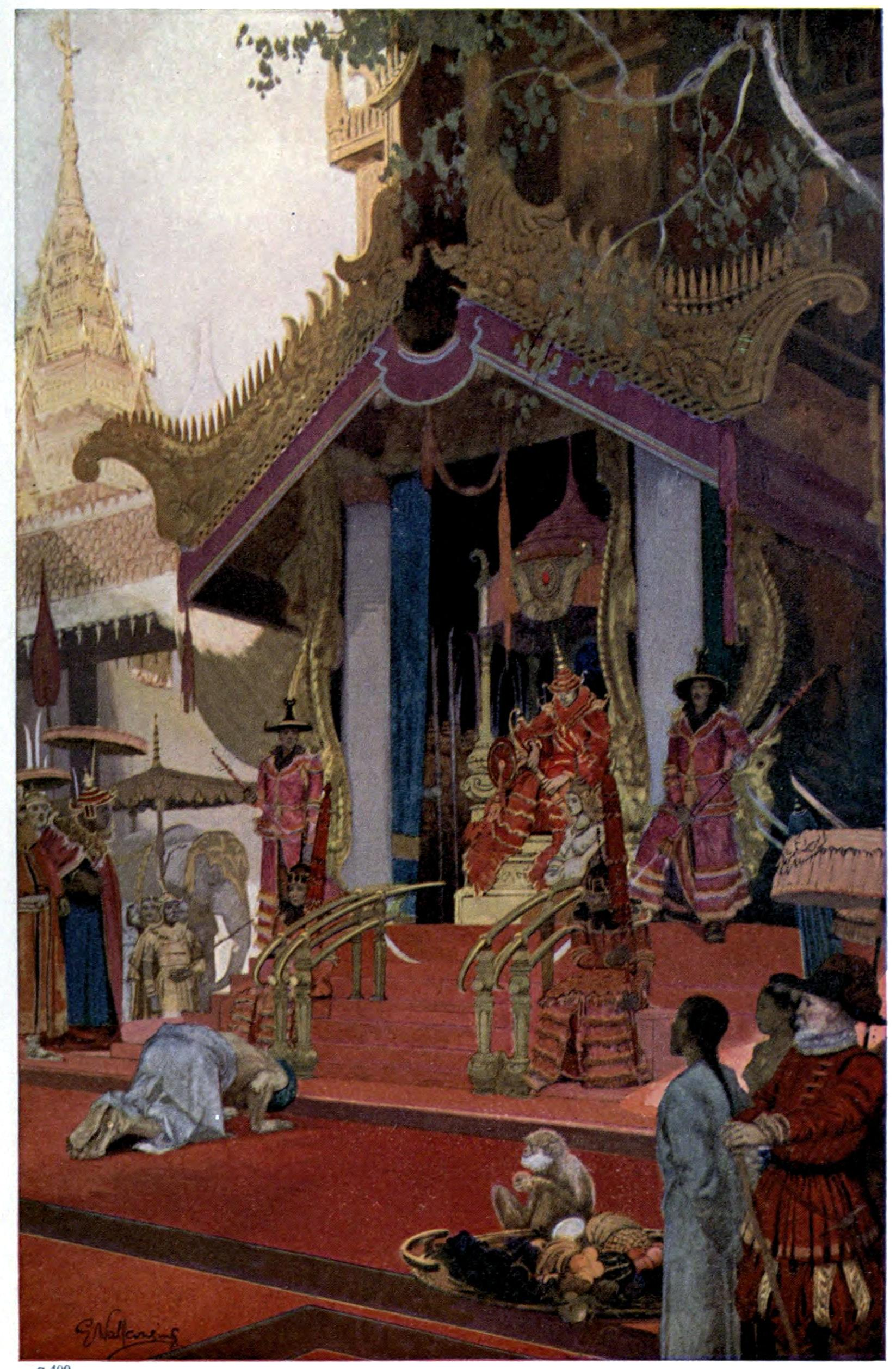
The king of Pegu receives an envoy (17th century)

This is a list of rulers of Pegu (Bago), one of the three main Mon-speaking provinces, located on the south-central coast of modern Myanmar. This is not a list of monarchs of the Hanthawaddy kingdom, who ruled Lower Burma from Pegu during three separate periods (1369–1539, 1550–1552, 1740–1757).

== Backgrounder ==
Various Mon language chronicles state different foundation dates of Pegu (Bago), ranging from 573 CE to 1152 CE. (Note: A version of the 18th century chronicle Slapat Rajawan as reported by Arthur Phayre (Phayre 1873: 32) states that the settlement was founded in 1116 Buddhist Era (572/573 CE). But another version of the Slapat, used by P.W. Schmidt (Schmidt 1906: 20, 101), states that it was founded on 1st waxing of Mak (Tabodwe) 1116 BE (c. 19 January 573 CE), which it says is equivalent to year 514 of "the third era", without specifying what the era specifically was. However, per (Phayre 1873: 39), one of the "native records" used by Maj. Lloyd says that Pegu was founded in 541 Burmese (Myanmar) Era, 1152/1153 CE. If the year 514 is indeed the Burmese Era, then the Slapat's 1st waxing of Tabodwe 514 would be 27 December 1152, equivalent to 1st waxing of Tabodwe 1696 BE (not 1116 BE).) The Zabu Kuncha, an early 15th century Ava (Upper Burmese) administrative treatise, states that Pegu was founded in 1276/77.

However, the earliest extant evidence of Pegu as a place dates only to the late Pagan period: 1212 and 1266. (Note: (Aung-Thwin 2005: 59) cites the 1266 inscription. (SMK Vol. 3 1983: 28–31): The inscription at the Min-Nan-Thu village near Bagan donated by daughter of Theingathu, dated Thursday, 7th waxing of Nanka (Wagaung) 628 ME (8 July 1266), lists Pegu as Pe-Ku. (Aung-Thwin 2017: 200, 332) updates by saying that the earliest extant inscriptions that mention Pegu date to 1212 and 1266 but does not provide the source of the 1212 inscription. None of the inscriptions listed in the Ancient Burmese Stone Inscriptions (SMK Vol. 1 1972: 93–102) for years 573 ME (1211/1212) or 574 ME (1212/1213) shows Pe-Ku or Pegu.) A purported copy of a 1086 inscription does mention Pegu. At any rate, the Slapat Rajawan chronicle itself states that Pegu emerged from "desolate wilderness" only in the late Pagan period, and the first Pagan-appointed official at Pegu was Akhamaman in 1273/74.

== Pagan period ==
In the late Pagan period, Pegu was not even the provincial capital of what would become known as the Pegu province in the 14th century. The provincial capital was Dala-Twante, the seat of Prince Kyawswa's fiefdom down to 1287.

| Name | Term From | Term Until | Relationship to predecessor(s) | Overlord | Notes |
|---|---|---|---|---|---|
| Akhamaman | c. 1273 | c. 1287 | | Narathihapate | Pagan appointed customs officer (c. 1273–1285); Self-proclaimed king (1285–c. 1287); controlled only around the town |
| Lekkhaya Byu | c. 1287 | c. 1287 (8 days) | brother-in-law | N/A | Usurper, ruled eight days |
| Tarabya | c. 1287 | c. 1296 | brother-in-law of A-Kha-Ma-Man | N/A | King of what became the Pegu Province in the kingdom of Martaban |

== Martaban Period ==
It is unclear if Pegu remained the provincial capital after Tarabya's death. According to the reporting in the Razadarit Ayedawbon, except for a brief period in the mid-1320s when King Saw Zein made it his temporary wartime capital, the other so-called governors of Pegu may have been just mayors. For example, in the early reign of King Hkun Law, the provincial capital seems to have been at Sittaung, where Law's deputy Nyi Maw-La-Mun resided.

| Name | Term From | Term Until | Relationship to predecessor(s) | Overlord | Notes |
| Laik-Gi | c. 1296 | c. 1307? | | Wareru | Former Chief Minister of Wareru |
| ? | | | | Hkun Law | |
| Saw Zein | after September 1323 | late 1320s | | Himself | Temporary capital of King Saw Zein |
| Binnya E Law | late 1320s | c. June 1330 | First cousin | Saw Zein | |
| ? | | | | Binnya E Law | |
| Min Linka | 1348 | c. 1353 | | Binnya U | Half-brother of Binnya U |
| ? | c. 1353 | 1369 | | Binnya U | |
See List of Kings of Ramanya (1369–1539)

== See also ==
- Hanthawaddy kingdom
- List of Burmese monarchs
- List of rulers of Ava
- List of Arakanese monarchs
- List of rulers of Bassein
- List of rulers of Martaban
- List of rulers of Prome
- List of rulers of Toungoo

== Bibliography ==
- Aung-Thwin, Michael A. (2005). The Mists of Rāmañña: The Legend that was Lower Burma (illustrated ed.). Honolulu: University of Hawai'i Press. ISBN 9780824828868.
- Aung-Thwin, Michael A. (2017). Myanmar in the Fifteenth Century. Honolulu: University of Hawai'i Press. ISBN 978-0-8248-6783-6.
- Nyein Maung, ed. (1972–1998). Shay-haung Myanma Kyauksa-mya [Ancient Burmese Stone Inscriptions] (in Burmese). Vol. 1–5. Yangon: Archaeological Department.
- Pan Hla, Nai (2005) [1968]. Razadarit Ayedawbon (in Burmese) (8th printing ed.). Yangon: Armanthit Sarpay.
- Phayre, Major-General Sir Arthur P. (1873). "The History of Pegu". Journal of the Asiatic Society of Bengal. 42. Calcutta: 23–57, 120–159.
- Phayre, Lt. Gen. Sir Arthur P. (1967) [1883]. History of Burma. London: Susil Gupta.
- Schmidt, P.W. (1906). "Slapat des Ragawan der Königsgeschichte". Die äthiopischen Handschriften der K.K. Hofbibliothek zu Wien (in German). 151. Vienna: Alfred Hölder.
