= List of rulers of Martaban =

This is a list of rulers of Martaban (Mottama), one of the three main Mon-speaking provinces of Lower Burma, from the 13th to 17th centuries. Martaban was the capital of Hanthawaddy kingdom (Ramanya) from 1287 to 1364.

== Pagan Period ==
The earliest extant evidence of Martaban on records is an 1176 inscription by King Sithu II of Pagan (Bagan).

| Name | Term From | Term Until | Relationship to predecessor(s) | Overlord | Notes |
|---|---|---|---|---|---|
| Nga Nwe | ? | ? | Appointed | | Grandfather of Nga Shwe |
| Nga Shwe | ? | 1259 | Grandson | Narathihapate | In revolt (1258–1259) |
| Aleimma | 1259 | 1285 | Appointed | Narathihapate | Descendant of Sithu I's Chief Minister Aleimma of Pagan |
| Wareru | c. 11 January 1285 | 30 January 1287 | Usurper | | In revolt (1285–87) |

== Hanthawaddy Period ==
| Name | Term From | Term Until | Relationship to predecessor(s) | Overlord | Notes |
|---|---|---|---|---|---|
See List of Kings of Ramanya (1287–1364)
| Byattaba | 1364 | 1388 | Brother-in-law of King Binnya U | | In revolt (1364–c. 1371/72) (1384–1388) |
| Byat Ka-Man (Bya Ka-Myin) | 1388 | 1411 or later (Note: Still governor in 1411 during the Ava–Hanthawaddy War (1408–1418).) | | Razadarit | |
| Binnya Kyan | 1422 | 1442/43 | | Binnya Dhammaraza; Binnya Ran I | Son of Razadarit |
| Tala Mi Saw? | 1442/43 | ? | Sister | Binnya Ran I | Daughter of Razadarit |
| Saw Binnya | by 1519 | May 1541 | | Binnya Ran II (1510s–1526); Taka Yut Pi (1526–1534) | In revolt (1534–1539); Self-proclaimed king (1539–1541) |

== Toungoo Period ==
| Name | Term From | Term Until | Relationship to predecessor(s) | Overlord | Notes |
|---|---|---|---|---|---|
| Saw Lagun Ein | May 1541 | May 1550 | Appointed | Tabinshwehti | Of Hanthawaddy royalty |
| Minye Sithu | 6 June 1552 | March 1556 | Appointed | Bayinnaung | Bayinnaung's brother |
| Minye Nandameit | March 1556 | c. May 1581 | Son | Bayinnaung | |
| Thiri Thudhamma Yaza | 26 May 1581 | 3 May 1584 | Cousin | Bayinnaung (1581); Nanda Bayin (1581–1584) | |
| Mingyi Khamidaw | c. May 1584 | October 1594 | Cousin | Nanda Bayin (1584–1594) | Nanda Bayin's son from minor queen |
Vacant (1594–1600)
| Binnya Dala | May 1600 | after 1613 | Appointed | Naresuan (1600–1605); Anaukpetlun (1613–?) | Siamese vassal (1600–1605); Ally of Portuguese Syriam (1605–1613); Burmese vassal (1613 onward) |

== See also ==
- Hanthawaddy kingdom
- List of Burmese monarchs
- List of rulers of Pegu
- List of rulers of Bassein

== Bibliography ==
- Aung-Thwin, Michael (2005). The mists of Rāmañña: The Legend that was Lower Burma (illustrated ed.). Honolulu: University of Hawaiʻi Press. ISBN 978-0-8248-2886-8.
- Aung-Thwin, Michael A. (2017). Myanmar in the Fifteenth Century. Honolulu: University of Hawaiʻi Press. ISBN 978-0-8248-6783-6.
- Kala, U (2006) [1724]. Maha Yazawin (in Burmese). Vol. 1–3 (4th printing ed.). Yangon: Ya-Pyei Publishing.
- Maha Sithu (2012) [1798]. Myint Swe; Kyaw Win; Thein Hlaing (eds.). Yazawin Thit (in Burmese). Vol. 1–3 (2nd printing ed.). Yangon: Ya-Pyei Publishing.
- Pan Hla, Nai (2005) [1968]. Razadarit Ayedawbon (in Burmese) (8th printing ed.). Yangon: Armanthit Sarpay.
