= Pak Lat Chronicles =

- Language: Mon
- Series: Burmese chronicles
- Genre: Chronicle, History
- Publication date: 1910, 1912
- Pages: 2 volumes

The Pak Lat Chronicles, as they are known in English, are a compilation of Mon history texts gathered from palm-leaf manuscripts by the Siamese Mon Monk Phra Candakanto around 1912-13.

This compilation of manuscript texts was published in two volumes as paper bound books. The printing took place at the Mon-language printing press of Pak Lat monastery on the outskirts of Bangkok. This famous Mon printing press published many other Buddhism-related titles in the early 20th century. The content of the compilation is diverse, including texts by different authors, chronicling the history of widely disparate historical eras from the Pagan Kingdom to King Bayinnaung's era of conquest. It also includes a version of the history of the Mon king Razadarit.

Scholarship on these texts often refers to the texts (or parts of them) using different names. Nidana Arambhakatha (genealogy of kings) and Rājāvaṁsa Kathā (history of the royal lineage) are two common names employed.

The Pak Lat chronicle texts are among the most difficult of all historical sources for Mon and Burmese historians to obtain. This is the likely reason why the composition and genealogy of the manuscripts in the compilation has yet to be studied and assessed in any scholarly depth.

The original published Pak Lat volumes can be found in the archives of the Siam Society in Bangkok and manuscript fragments of various sections can be found at Thailand's National archives. Mon scholar Harry Leonard Shorto translated parts of the published volumes that have circulated in private until now. A plan to publish an edited version of these translations was apparently never realized.

The chronicles have been used extensively in the historical narratives of historians such as G.E. Harvey, Nai Pan Hla and Victor Lieberman. Pan Hla used the Pak Lat chronicle texts when he wrote his published Mon version of Razadarit Ayedawbon.

According to Aung-Thwin, it is also first Mon-language chronicle to mention King Anawrahta's conquest of Thaton, a topic that according to his research all previous Mon language chronicles never once mentioned. He speculates that the British historians' narratives and interpretations were incorporated into the leitmotif of this supposedly ancient text before they were published around 1910.

== Bibliography ==
- Aung-Thwin, Michael A. (2005). The Mists of Rāmañña: The Legend that was Lower Burma (illustrated ed.). Honolulu: University of Hawai'i Press. ISBN 9780824828868.
- Harvey, G. E. (1925). History of Burma: From the Earliest Times to 10 March 1824. London: Frank Cass & Co. Ltd.
- Lieberman, Victor (1984). Burmese Administrative Cycles Anarchy and Conquest C. 1580-1760. Princeton: Princeton Univ. Press.
- McCormick, Patrick (2011). The Mon Rajavamsa Katha: Tellings of a Southeast Asian History. In The Mon over Two Millennia: Monuments, Manuscripts, Movements, edited by Patrick A. McCormick, Matthias Jenny and Chris Baker. Institute of Asian Studies, Chulalongkom University.
- Pan Hla, Nai (1968). Razadarit Ayedawbon (in Burmese) (8th printing, 2005 ed.). Yangon: Armanthit Sarpay.
- Paphatsaun Thianpanya No Date. "Mon Language in Thailand: The endangered heritage" Assumption Commercial College, Bangkok.
- Shorto, H.L. (1961). "A Mon Genealogy of Kings: Observations on the Nidana Arambhakatha," In In D. G. E. Hall (ed.). Historians of South-East Asia. London: Oxford University Press.
- Shorto, H. L. No Date. Nidana Ramadhipati-katha. Unpublished typescript translation of pp. 34–44, 61-264 of Phra Candakanto (editor). On binding Rajawamsa Dhammaceti Mahapitakadhara. Pak Lat, Siam (1912).
